= 2023–24 Seattle Redhawks men's basketball team =

American college basketball season

2023–24 Seattle Redhawks men's basketball

CBI champions
- Conference: Western Athletic Conference
- Record: 23–14 (11–9 WAC)
- Head coach: Chris Victor (3rd season)
- Assistant coaches: Grant Leep; D'Marques Tyson; Colin Rardin
- Home arena: Redhawk Center; Climate Pledge Arena

2023–24 WAC men's basketball standings
	Conf.				Overall
Team	W		L	PCT	W		L	PCT
Grand Canyon †	17	–	3	.850	30	–	5	.857
Tarleton *	16	–	4	.800	25	–	10	.714
UT Arlington	13	–	7	.650	20	–	14	.588
Seattle	11	–	9	.550	23	–	14	.622
Utah Valley	11	–	9	.550	16	–	16	.500
Stephen F. Austin	10	–	10	.500	18	–	15	.545
Abilene Christian	10	–	10	.500	16	–	18	.471
California Baptist	8	–	12	.400	16	–	17	.485
Utah Tech *	7	–	13	.350	11	–	20	.355
Southern Utah	5	–	15	.250	10	–	21	.323
UT Rio Grande Valley	2	–	18	.100	6	–	25	.194
† 2024 WAC tournament winner * Ineligible for the NCAA tournament due to transition from Division II

The 2023–24 Seattle Redhawks men's basketball team represented Seattle University in the 2023–24 NCAA Division I men's basketball season. They were led by third-year head coach Chris Victor and played their games on campus at the Redhawk Center and off campus at Climate Pledge Arena. They competed as members of the Western Athletic Conference. They finished the season 23–14, 11–9 in WAC play to finish in a tie for fourth place. As the No. 4 seed in the WAC Tournament, they defeated California Baptist in the quarterfinals, before losing to Grand Canyon in the semifinals. They received an invitation to the CBI, where they defeated Delaware State, Evansville, Fairfield, and High Point to win the CBI championship, the program's first postseason tournament championship.

== Previous season ==
The Redhawks finished the season 20–12, 11–7 in conference play to finish in fifth place. In the WAC tournament, the team lost their first round game against Grand Canyon to end their season. A week after the Redhawks' season ended, associate head coach Alex Pribble became the head coach at the University of Idaho in Moscow.

== Roster ==
2023–24 Seattle Redhawks men's basketball team
Players
Coaches

Pos.	#	Name	Height	Weight	Year	Hometown
G	0	Alex Schumacher	6 ft 3 in (1.91 m)	185 lb (84 kg)	Sr	Vancouver, Washington
G	1	Vasja Pandža	6 ft 8 in (2.03 m)	210 lb (95 kg)	Jr	Leeds, England
G	2	Paris Dawson	6 ft 2 in (1.88 m)	170 lb (77 kg)	Jr	Carson, California
G	5	Cameron Tyson	6 ft 3 in (1.91 m)	190 lb (86 kg)	RS Sr	Bothell, Washington
G	10	Jazel Brown	6 ft 1 in (1.85 m)	185 lb (84 kg)	Fr	Seattle, Washington
G	11	John Cristofilis	6 ft 3 in (1.91 m)	195 lb (88 kg)	RS Sr	Seattle, Washington
G	12	Brody Nunn	6 ft 1 in (1.85 m)	175 lb (79 kg)	RS So	Melbourne, Australia
F	15	Will Heimbrodt	6 ft 7 in (2.01 m)	220 lb (100 kg)	RS Fr	San Anselmo, California
F	21	Viktor Rajković	6 ft 6 in (1.98 m)	220 lb (100 kg)	Jr	Mill Valley, California
F	23	Seyi Reiley	6 ft 6 in (1.98 m)	205 lb (93 kg)	Sr	Negril, Jamaica
F	24	Malek Gomma	6 ft 6 in (1.98 m)	205 lb (93 kg)	Fr	Seattle, Washington
F	25	Brandton Chatfield	6 ft 10 in (2.08 m)	225 lb (102 kg)	RS Jr	Orofino, Idaho
G	30	Niko Fotopoulos	6 ft 3 in (1.91 m)	175 lb (79 kg)	RS Fr	Seattle, Washington
G	33	Kobe Williamson	6 ft 8 in (2.03 m)	225 lb (102 kg)	Jr	Melbourne, Australia
G	35	Matthew Levis	6 ft 1 in (1.85 m)	175 lb (79 kg)	Jr	Portland, Oregon

Head coach

- Chris Victor (Concordia–Irvine)

Assistant coach(es)

- Grant Leep (Washington)
- D'Marques Tyson (Portland)
- Colin Rardin (Pacific)

Legend

- (C) Team captain
- (S) Suspended
- (I) Ineligible
- (W) Walk-on
- Injured
- Current redshirt

Roster
Last update: October 26, 2023

== Schedule and results ==
Date time, TV	Rank^{#}	Opponent^{#}	Result	Record	High points	High rebounds	High assists	Site (attendance) city, state
Regular season
November 8, 2023*; 7:00 p.m., ESPN+		Prairie View A&M	W 71–60	1–0	18 – Christofilis	8 – Tyson	4 – Schumacher	Redhawk Center (999); Seattle, WA
November 11, 2023*; 2:00 p.m., ESPN+		Montana State	W 71–68	2–0	18 – Tyson	8 – Pandža	9 – Schumacher	Redhawk Center (999); Seattle, WA
November 15, 2023*; 7:00 p.m., ESPN+		Northern Arizona	L 60–62	2–1	24 – Schumacher	10 – Williamson	4 – Schumacher	Climate Pledge Arena (1,410); Seattle, WA
November 18, 2023*; 11:00 a.m., ESPN+		at VCU	L 56–60	2–2	17 – Williamson	8 – Williamson	2 – Tyson	Siegel Center (6,421); Richmond, VA
November 22, 2023*; 5:00 p.m., ESPN+		Idaho	W 92–55	3–2	28 – Williamson	8 – Chatfield	11 – Schumacher	Redhawk Center (999); Seattle, WA
November 26, 2023*; 3:00 p.m., ESPN+		UC San Diego	W 79–67	4–2	28 – Tyson	8 – Chatfield	6 – Pandža	Redhawk Center (836); Seattle, WA
November 29, 2023; 5:00 p.m., ESPN+		at Utah Valley	L 72–78	4–3 (0–1)	23 – Tyson	6 – Chatfield	7 – Schumacher	UCCU Center (2,319); Orem, UT
December 2, 2023; 3:00 p.m., ESPN+		Southern Utah	W 73–63	5–3 (1–1)	22 – Tyson	8 – Chatfield	8 – Schumacher	Redhawk Center (943); Seattle, WA
December 9, 2023*; 5:00 p.m., ESPN+		Northwest	W 101–46	6–3	18 – Dawson	8 – Tied	4 – Tied	Redhawk Center (705); Seattle, WA
December 13, 2023*; 7:00 p.m., ESPN+		at San Francisco	L 59–62	6–4	22 – Tyson	7 – Williamson	4 – Tied	War Memorial Gymnasium (2,112); San Francisco, CA
December 17, 2023*; 5:00 p.m., ESPN+		Washington; Rivalry	L 99–100 ^{2OT}	6–5	20 – Schumacher	10 – Chatfield	8 – Schumacher	Climate Pledge Arena (5,702); Seattle, WA
December 20, 2023*; 7:00 p.m., ESPN+		Louisiana Tech; C–USA/WAC Alliance	W 79–73 ^{OT}	7–5	33 – Tyson	8 – Tyson	3 – Williamson	Redhawk Center (702); Seattle, WA
December 30, 2023*; 6:00 p.m., ESPN+		at UTEP; C–USA/WAC Alliance	W 73–61	8–5	25 – Tyson	9 – Dawson	4 – Reiley	Don Haskins Center (4,391); El Paso, TX
January 4, 2024; 7:00 p.m., ESPN+		Utah Tech	W 70–53	9–5 (2–1)	32 – Christofilis	12 – Chatfield	3 – Tied	Redhawk Center (944); Seattle, WA
January 6, 2024; 3:00 p.m., ESPN+		California Baptist	W 48–46	10–5 (3–1)	17 – Tyson	8 – Chatfield	5 – Dawson	Redhawk Center (795); Seattle, WA
January 11, 2024; 4:30 p.m., ESPN+		at UT Rio Grande Valley	L 80–81 ^{OT}	10–6 (3–2)	25 – Schumacher	8 – Williamson	6 – Schumacher	UTRGV Fieldhouse (591); Edinburg, TX
January 13, 2024; 12:00 p.m., ESPN+		at UT Arlington	L 75–80	10–7 (3–3)	22 – Christofilis	9 – Reiley	8 – Schumacher	College Park Center (1,009); Arlington, TX
January 18, 2024; 4:30 p.m., ESPN+		at Stephen F. Austin	L 84–89 ^{OT}	10–8 (3–4)	24 – Schumacher	12 – Chatfield	7 – Schumacher	William R. Johnson Coliseum (2,361); Nacogdoches, TX
January 20, 2024; 7:00 p.m., ESPN+		Grand Canyon	W 86–79	11–8 (4–4)	25 – Tyson	5 – Tied	6 – Schumacher	Redhawk Center (1,000); Seattle, WA
January 26, 2024; 6:00 p.m., ESPN+		Utah Valley	W 62–61	12–8 (5–4)	16 – Tyson	11 – Williamson	4 – Schumacher	Redhawk Center (999); Seattle, WA
February 1, 2024; 6:00 p.m., ESPN+		at Grand Canyon	L 88–95 ^{OT}	12–9 (5–5)	20 – Tyson	10 – Williamson	5 – Tied	GCU Arena (7,276); Phoenix, AZ
February 3, 2024; 5:00 p.m., ESPN+		at California Baptist	W 61–60	13–9 (6–5)	18 – Tyson	5 – Tied	4 – Tied	Fowler Events Center (4,822); Riverside, CA
February 8, 2024; 7:00 p.m., ESPN+		Abilene Christian	W 75–52	14–9 (7–5)	14 – Tied	12 – Williamson	4 – Tied	Climate Pledge Arena (2,354); Seattle, WA
February 10, 2024; 3:00 p.m., ESPN+		Tarleton State	L 77–82	14–10 (7–6)	23 – Schumacher	8 – Schumacher	6 – Schumacher	Redhawk Center (966); Seattle, WA
February 15, 2024; 5:30 p.m., ESPN+		at Southern Utah	W 78–68	15–10 (8–6)	25 – Christofilis	7 – Rajković	4 – Schumacher	America First Event Center (1,175); Cedar City, UT
February 17, 2024; 6:00 p.m., ESPN+		at Utah Tech	W 66–65	16–10 (9–6)	16 – Tyson	13 – Tyson	4 – Schumacher	Burns Arena (1,739); St. George, UT
February 22, 2024; 7:00 p.m., ESPN+		Stephen F. Austin	W 69–49	17–10 (10–6)	27 – Tyson	8 – Reiley	8 – Schumacher	Redhawk Center (932); Seattle, WA
February 24, 2024; 3:00 p.m., ESPN+		UT Rio Grande Valley	W 84–56	18–10 (11–6)	24 – Christofilis	11 – Williamson	7 – Schumacher	Redhawk Center (926); Seattle, WA
February 29, 2024; 7:00 p.m., ESPN+		UT Arlington	L 62–82	18–11 (11–7)	32 – Tyson	7 – Reiley	2 – Dawson	Redhawk Center (999); Seattle, WA
March 7, 2024; 5:00 p.m., ESPN+		at Abilene Christian	L 59–64	18–12 (11–8)	13 – Tied	9 – Chatfield	6 – Schumacher	Moody Coliseum (1,437); Abilene, TX
March 9, 2024; 2:00 p.m., ESPN+		at Tarleton State	L 66–69	18–13 (11–9)	15 – Tyson	15 – Reiley	6 – Schumacher	Wisdom Gymnasium (2,024); Stephenville, TX
WAC tournament
March 14, 2024; 6:00 p.m., ESPN+	(4)	vs. (8) California Baptist; Quarterfinals	W 81–57	19–13	18 – Tyson	5 – Tyson	9 – Schumacher	Orleans Arena (1,106); Paradise, NV
March 15, 2024; 6:00 p.m., ESPN+	(4)	vs. (1) Grand Canyon; Semifinals	L 72–80	19–14	21 – Schumacher	7 – Schumacher	7 – Schumacher	Orleans Arena (2,250); Paradise, NV
CBI
March 23, 2024; 2:30 p.m., FloHoops	(3)	vs. (14) Delaware State; First round	W 79–66	20–14	19 – Tyson	8 – Rajković	7 – Schumacher	Ocean Center (795); Daytona Beach, FL
March 25, 2024; 3:30 p.m., FloHoops	(3)	vs. (11) Evansville; Quarterfinals	W 71–57	21–14	22 – Schumacher	8 – Reiley	4 – Schumacher	Ocean Center (724); Daytona Beach, FL
March 26, 2024; 6:00 p.m., ESPN2	(3)	vs. (7) Fairfield; Semifinals	W 75–58	22–14	21 – Tied	8 – Reiley	5 – Schumacher	Ocean Center (601); Daytona Beach, FL
March 27, 2024; 2:00 p.m., ESPN2	(3)	vs. (1) High Point; Championship	W 77–67	23–14	30 – Tyson	16 – Reiley	4 – Schumacher	Ocean Center (671); Daytona Beach, FL
*Non-conference game. ^{#}Rankings from AP Poll. (#) Tournament seedings in parentheses. All times are in Pacific Time.
