= 2023–24 Grand Canyon Antelopes men's basketball team =

American college basketball season

2023–24 Grand Canyon Antelopes men's basketball

WAC regular-season and tournament champions

NCAA tournament, Second Round
- Conference: Western Athletic Conference
- Record: 30–5 (17–3 WAC)
- Head coach: Bryce Drew (4th season)
- Assistant coaches: Jamall Walker; Ed Schilling; Casey Shaw; Marc Rodgers; Jake Lindsey
- Home arena: GCU Arena

2023–24 WAC men's basketball standings
	Conf.				Overall
Team	W		L	PCT	W		L	PCT
Grand Canyon †	17	–	3	.850	30	–	5	.857
Tarleton *	16	–	4	.800	25	–	10	.714
UT Arlington	13	–	7	.650	20	–	14	.588
Seattle	11	–	9	.550	23	–	14	.622
Utah Valley	11	–	9	.550	16	–	16	.500
Stephen F. Austin	10	–	10	.500	18	–	15	.545
Abilene Christian	10	–	10	.500	16	–	18	.471
California Baptist	8	–	12	.400	16	–	17	.485
Utah Tech *	7	–	13	.350	11	–	20	.355
Southern Utah	5	–	15	.250	10	–	21	.323
UT Rio Grande Valley	2	–	18	.100	6	–	25	.194
† 2024 WAC tournament winner * Ineligible for the NCAA tournament due to transition from Division II

The 2023–24 Grand Canyon Antelopes men's basketball team represented Grand Canyon University in the 2023–24 NCAA Division I men's basketball season. They were led by fourth-year head coach Bryce Drew and played their games at GCU Arena in Phoenix, Arizona as members of the Western Athletic Conference (WAC). They finished the season 30–5, 17–3 in WAC play, to win the regular-season championship. As the No. 1 seed in the WAC, they defeated Seattle in the semifinals and beat UT Arlington in the championship to win the WAC tournament. Therefore, they received an automatic bid to the NCAA tournament where as the No. 12 seed in the West region, they upset Saint Mary's in the first round, before losing to Alabama in the second round.

== Previous season ==
The Antelopes finished the 2022–23 season 24–12, 11–7 in WAC play, to finish in fourth place. They defeated UT Arlington, Seattle, Sam Houston and Southern Utah to win the WAC tournament, receiving the conference's auto-bid to the NCAA tournament as a 14-seed. The Antelopes faced 3-seed Gonzaga in the first round and were defeated 82–70 to end their season.

== Roster ==
2023–24 Grand Canyon Antelopes men's basketball team
Players
Coaches

Pos.	#	Name	Height	Weight	Year	Hometown
G	0	Ray Harrison	6 ft 4 in (1.93 m)	195 lb (88 kg)	Jr	Greenville, SC
F	1	Derrick Michael Xzavierro	6 ft 10 in (2.08 m)	235 lb (107 kg)	RS Fr	Jakarta, Indonesia
F	2	Sydney Curry	6 ft 8 in (2.03 m)	270 lb (122 kg)	Sr	Fort Wayne, IN
F	5	Lök Wur	6 ft 9 in (2.06 m)	210 lb (95 kg)	Sr	North Omaha, NE
G	6	Malcolm Flaggs	6 ft 6 in (1.98 m)	200 lb (91 kg)	RS Fr	Tuba City, AZ
G	7	Tyon Grant-Foster	6 ft 7 in (2.01 m)	210 lb (95 kg)	Sr	Kansas City, KS
G	8	Collin Moore	6 ft 4 in (1.93 m)	205 lb (93 kg)	Jr	North Little Rock, AR
G	10	Jovan Jr. Blacksher	5 ft 11 in (1.8 m)	165 lb (75 kg)	Sr	Oakland, CA
G	11	Caleb Shaw	6 ft 5 in (1.96 m)	205 lb (93 kg)	So	Phoenix, AZ
G	13	Marquese Josephs	6 ft 1 in (1.85 m)	195 lb (88 kg)	Fr	Toronto, ON
C	21	Noah Amenhauser	7 ft 0 in (2.13 m)	225 lb (102 kg)	Fr	Goodyear, AZ
G	22	Josh Baker	6 ft 4 in (1.93 m)	185 lb (84 kg)	Sr	Phoenix, AZ
F	24	Duke Brennan	6 ft 10 in (2.08 m)	250 lb (113 kg)	So	Chandler, AZ
F	30	Gabe McGlothan	6 ft 7 in (2.01 m)	235 lb (107 kg)	RS Sr	Gilbert, AZ
G	33	Isaiah Shaw	6 ft 8 in (2.03 m)	205 lb (93 kg)	RS Fr	Rome, Italy

Head coach

- Bryce Drew (Valparaiso)

Assistant coach(es)

- Jamall Walker (Saint Louis)
- Ed Schilling (Miami (OH))
- Casey Shaw (Toledo)

Legend

- (C) Team captain
- (S) Suspended
- (I) Ineligible
- (W) Walk-on
- Injured
- Current redshirt

Roster
Last update: October 20, 2023

== Schedule and results ==
Date time, TV	Rank^{#}	Opponent^{#}	Result	Record	High points	High rebounds	High assists	Site (attendance) city, state
Exhibition
November 1, 2023*; 7:00 p.m., Fox 10 Xtra/ESPN+		Embry–Riddle (AZ)	W 104–46	−	23 – Grant-Foster	9 – Brennan	6 – Moore	GCU Arena (7,093); Phoenix, AZ
Regular season
November 6, 2023*; 7:00 p.m., Fox 10 Xtra/ESPN+		Southeast Missouri State	W 88–67	1–0	30 – Grant-Foster	10 – Brennan	5 – Harrison	GCU Arena (7,186); Phoenix, AZ
November 12, 2023*; 3:30 p.m., Fox 10 Xtra/ESPN+		Northern Arizona; Arizona Tip-Off campus-site game	W 89–55	2–0	17 – Curry	14 – McGlothan	4 – Moore	GCU Arena (7,118); Phoenix, AZ
November 17, 2023*; 7:00 p.m., CBSSN		vs. San Francisco; Arizona Tip-Off semifinals	W 76–72	3–0	28 – Grant-Foster	8 – McGlothan	5 – Harrison	Desert Diamond Arena (3,214); Glendale, AZ
November 19, 2023*; 5:00 p.m., CBSSN		vs. South Carolina; Arizona Tip-Off championship	L 68–75	3–1	18 – McGlothan	9 – McGlothan	3 – Harrison	Desert Diamond Arena (2,589); Glendale, AZ
November 25, 2023*; 6:00 p.m., Fox 10 Xtra/ESPN+		North Dakota State	W 86–71	4–1	25 – Grant-Foster	10 – Curry	6 – Harrison	GCU Arena (7,208); Phoenix, AZ
November 29, 2023; 5:30 p.m., ESPN+		at UT Rio Grande Valley	W 79–69	5–1 (1–0)	25 – Grant-Foster	11 – Grant-Foster	5 – Harrison	UTRGV Fieldhouse (1,944); Edinburg, TX
December 2, 2023; 6:00 p.m., Fox 10 Xtra/ESPN+		UT Arlington	W 76–69	6–1 (2–0)	21 – Grant-Foster	10 – Grant-Foster	2 – 2 tied	GCU Arena (7,214); Phoenix, AZ
December 5, 2023*; 7:00 p.m., ESPNU		No. 25 San Diego State	W 79–73	7–1	23 – Harrison	13 – McGlothan	5 – Grant-Foster	GCU Arena (7,282); Phoenix, AZ
December 9, 2023*; 12:00 p.m., ESPNU		at Liberty; C-USA/WAC Alliance	W 69–64	8–1	21 – McGlothan	7 – 3 tied	3 – 2 tied	Liberty Arena (4,052); Lynchburg, VA
December 16, 2023*; 7:30 p.m., −		vs. Portland; Jerry Colangelo Classic	W 91–63	9–1	26 – McGlothan	11 – McGlothan	5 – 2 tied	Footprint Center (4,509); Phoenix, AZ
December 20, 2023*; 6:00 p.m., Fox 10 Xtra/ESPN+		Sam Houston; C–USA/WAC Alliance	W 76–64	10–1	19 – Brennan	10 – Brennan	5 – 2 tied	GCU Arena (N/A); Phoenix, AZ
December 27, 2023*; 1:00 p.m., −		vs. Bethesda	W 124–74	11–1	20 – Blacksher Jr.	11 – Xzavierro	9 – Baker	Luke Air Force Base (483); Glendale, AZ
December 30, 2023*; 6:00 p.m., Fox 10 Xtra/ESPN+		Louisiana Tech	W 73–70	12–1	22 – Harrison	8 – Brennan	5 – Harrison	GCU Arena (7,436); Phoenix, AZ
January 4, 2024; 6:30 p.m., ESPN+		at Southern Utah	W 96–75	13–1 (3–0)	27 – Grant-Foster	10 – McGlothan	5 – Harrison	America First Event Center (1,007); Cedar City, UT
January 6, 2024; 7:00 p.m., ESPN+		at Utah Tech	W 75–65	14–1 (4–0)	23 – McGlothan	8 – Grant-Foster	4 – Moore	Burns Arena (1,492); St. George, UT
January 11, 2024; 7:00 p.m., Fox 10 Xtra/ESPN+		Abilene Christian	W 74–64	15–1 (5–0)	24 – Grant-Foster	10 – Brennan	5 – McGlothan	GCU Arena (7,105); Phoenix, AZ
January 13, 2024; 6:00 p.m., Fox 10 Xtra/ESPN+		Tarleton State	W 74–48	16–1 (6–0)	20 – McGlothan	9 – McGlothan	6 – Moore	GCU Arena (7,233); Phoenix, AZ
January 18, 2024; 7:00 p.m., Fox 10 Xtra/ESPN+		Utah Valley	W 78–65	17–1 (7–0)	14 – McGlothan	7 – 2 tied	4 – McGlothan	GCU Arena (7,239); Phoenix, AZ
January 20, 2024; 8:00 p.m., ESPN+		at Seattle	L 79–86	17–2 (7–1)	28 – McGlothan	7 – 2 tied	2 – Harrison	Redhawk Center (1,000); Seattle, WA
January 25, 2024; 5:30 p.m., ESPN+		at Stephen F. Austin	W 53–51	18–2 (8–1)	15 – Harrison	14 – Brennan	4 – Harrison	William R. Johnson Coliseum (3,649); Nacogdoches, TX
January 27, 2024; 1:00 p.m., ESPN+		at UT Arlington	W 67–61	19–2 (9–1)	18 – Grant-Foster	9 – McGlothan	3 – Harrison	College Park Center (2,871); Arlington, TX
February 1, 2024; 7:00 p.m., Fox 10 Xtra/ESPN+		Seattle	W 95–88 ^{OT}	20–2 (10–1)	25 – McGlothan	9 – Brennan	8 – Harrison	GCU Arena (7,276); Phoenix, AZ
February 3, 2024; 2:00 p.m., ESPN+		at Utah Valley	W 86–67	21–2 (11–1)	21 – Harrison	11 – McGlothan	3 – 4 tied	UCCU Center (2,381); Orem, UT
February 10, 2024; 6:00 p.m., Fox 10 Xtra/ESPN+		Southern Utah	W 94–65	22–2 (12–1)	18 – Grant-Foster	11 – Wur	3 – Moore	GCU Arena (7,124); Phoenix, AZ
February 15, 2024; 7:00 p.m., Fox 10 Xtra/ESPN+		Utah Tech	W 73–61	23–2 (13–1)	16 – Grant-Foster	16 – Brennan	6 – Harrison	GCU Arena (7,117); Phoenix, AZ
February 17, 2024; 6:00 p.m., Fox 10 Xtra/ESPN+		California Baptist	W 79–76	24–2 (14–1)	19 – Grant-Foster	11 – McGlothan	6 – Harrison	GCU Arena (7,268); Phoenix, AZ
February 22, 2024; 6:00 p.m., ESPN+		at Tarleton State	L 74–77	24–3 (14–2)	25 – Grant-Foster	13 – Grant-Foster	4 – Grant-Foster	Wisdom Gymnasium (3,000); Stephenville, TX
February 24, 2024; 2:00 p.m., ESPN+		at Abilene Christian	L 73–79	24–4 (14–3)	17 – Grant-Foster	7 – McGlothan	2 – Harrison	Moody Coliseum (1,669); Abilene, TX
February 29, 2024; 7:00 p.m., Fox 10 Xtra/ESPN+		UT Rio Grande Valley	W 72–43	25–4 (15–3)	21 – Grant-Foster	7 – 2 tied	6 – Baker	GCU Arena (7,192); Phoenix, AZ
March 2, 2024; 8:00 p.m., ESPNU		Stephen F. Austin	W 80–58	26–4 (16–3)	29 – Grant-Foster	8 – Brennan	7 – Harrison	GCU Arena (7,388); Phoenix, AZ
March 9, 2024; 6:00 p.m., ESPN+		at California Baptist	W 68–47	27–4 (17–3)	19 – Grant-Foster	6 – Brennan	5 – Harrison	Fowler Events Center (5,363); Riverside, CA
WAC tournament
March 15, 2024; 6:00 p.m., ESPN+	(1)	vs. (4) Seattle; Semifinals	W 80–72	28–4	28 – Grant-Foster	9 – McGlothan	4 – Harrison	Orleans Arena (2,250); Paradise, NV
March 16, 2024; 8:30 p.m., ESPN2	(1)	vs. (3) UT Arlington; Championship	W 89–74	29–4	22 – Grant-Foster	9 – Grant-Foster	3 – 2 tied	Orleans Arena (4,019); Paradise, NV
NCAA tournament
March 22, 2024; 7:05 p.m., TruTV	(12 W)	vs. (5 W) No. 15 Saint Mary's; First Round	W 75–66	30–4	22 – Grant-Foster	11 – McGlothan	6 – Harrison	Spokane Arena (11,616); Spokane, WA
March 24, 2024; 4:10 p.m., TBS	(12 W)	vs. (4 W) No. 19 Alabama; Second Round	L 61–72	30–5	29 – Grant-Foster	8 – 2 tied	2 – 2 tied	Spokane Arena; Spokane, WA
*Non-conference game. ^{#}Rankings from AP poll. (#) Tournament seedings in parentheses. All times are in Mountain.
