= 2023–24 Abilene Christian Wildcats men's basketball team =

Basketball team season

2023–24 Abilene Christian Wildcats men's basketball

CIT, quarterfinals
- Conference: Western Athletic Conference
- Record: 16–18 (10–10 WAC)
- Head coach: Brette Tanner (3rd season)
- Assistant coaches: Cinco Boone; Ted Crass; Cameron Henderson; Doug Karleskint; Jon Trilli
- Home arena: Moody Coliseum

2023–24 WAC men's basketball standings
	Conf.				Overall
Team	W		L	PCT	W		L	PCT
Grand Canyon †	17	–	3	.850	30	–	5	.857
Tarleton *	16	–	4	.800	25	–	10	.714
UT Arlington	13	–	7	.650	20	–	14	.588
Seattle	11	–	9	.550	23	–	14	.622
Utah Valley	11	–	9	.550	16	–	16	.500
Stephen F. Austin	10	–	10	.500	18	–	15	.545
Abilene Christian	10	–	10	.500	16	–	18	.471
California Baptist	8	–	12	.400	16	–	17	.485
Utah Tech *	7	–	13	.350	11	–	20	.355
Southern Utah	5	–	15	.250	10	–	21	.323
UT Rio Grande Valley	2	–	18	.100	6	–	25	.194
† 2024 WAC tournament winner * Ineligible for the NCAA tournament due to transition from Division II

The 2023–24 Abilene Christian Wildcats men's basketball team represented Abilene Christian University during the 2023–24 NCAA Division I men's basketball season. The Wildcats, led by third-year head coach Brette Tanner, played their home games at Moody Coliseum in Abilene, Texas as members of the Western Athletic Conference (WAC). They finished the season 16–18, 10–10 in WAC play, to finish in a tie for sixth place. As the No. 7 seed in the WAC tournament, they lost to Stephen F. Austin in the first round. They received an invitation to the CIT, where they defeated Texas A&M–Corpus Christi in the first round, before losing to fellow WAC member Tarleton in the quarterfinals.

== Previous season ==
The Wildcats finished the 2022–23 season 13–17, 7–11 in WAC play, to finish in ninth place. In the first round of the WAC tournament, they were defeated by California Baptist.

== Roster ==
2023–24 Abilene Christian Wildcats men's basketball team
Players
Coaches

Pos.	#	Name	Height	Weight	Year	Previous school	Hometown
G	0	JV Seat	6 ft 3 in (1.91 m)	240 lb (109 kg)	So	Edmond Memorial HS	Edmond, OK
G	1	Colby Tanner	5 ft 10 in (1.78 m)	160 lb (73 kg)	So	Wylie HS	Abilene, TX
G	2	Yaniel Rivera	6 ft 4 in (1.93 m)	175 lb (79 kg)	Fr	Dade Christian School	Bayamón, Puerto Rico
F	3	Leonardo Bettiol	6 ft 8 in (2.03 m)	214 lb (97 kg)	So	Liceo Duca degli Abruzzi	Roncade, Italy
G	4	Kavion McClain	5 ft 9 in (1.75 m)	160 lb (73 kg)	Jr	Howard College	Memphis, TN
F	5	Cameron Steele	6 ft 8 in (2.03 m)	205 lb (93 kg)	Sr	Minnetonka HS	Excelsior, MN
G	10	Nasir DeGruy	6 ft 4 in (1.93 m)	180 lb (82 kg)	So	LSU–Eunice	New Orleans, LA
F	11	Ma'Shy Hill	6 ft 9 in (2.06 m)	240 lb (109 kg)	Fr	Spire Institute Academy	Austin, TX
G	13	Muodubem Muoneke	6 ft 5 in (1.96 m)	218 lb (99 kg)	So	Cypress Ranch HS	Cypress, TX
G	21	Hunter Jack Madden	6 ft 2 in (1.88 m)	190 lb (86 kg)	Sr	Otero College	Sydney, Australia
F	22	Aidan Igiehon	6 ft 10 in (2.08 m)	250 lb (113 kg)	Sr	Grand Canyon	Dublin, Ireland
F	23	Airion Simmons	6 ft 5 in (1.96 m)	264 lb (120 kg)	Sr	Parkview Magnet HS	Little Rock, AR
G	24	Ali Abdou Dibba	6 ft 4 in (1.93 m)	185 lb (84 kg)	Jr	Chicago State	Stockholm, Sweden
G	25	Immanuel Allen	6 ft 4 in (1.93 m)	215 lb (98 kg)	Sr	Butler CC	Phoenix, AZ

Head coach

- Brette Tanner (Emporia State)

Assistant coach(es)

- Cinco Boone (Eastern New Mexico)
- Ted Crass (Little Rock)
- Cameron Henderson (Montana State)
- Doug Karleskint (MidAmerica Nazarene)
- Jon Trilli (Midwestern State)

Legend

- (C) Team captain
- (S) Suspended
- (I) Ineligible
- (W) Walk-on
- Injured
- Current redshirt

Roster
Last update: October 22, 2023

== Schedule and results ==
Date time, TV	Rank^{#}	Opponent^{#}	Result	Record	Site (attendance) city, state
Exhibition
October 28, 2023*; 2:00 p.m.		Arlington Baptist	W 82–61		Moody Coliseum; Abilene, TX
Regular season
November 6, 2023*; 8:00 p.m., ESPN+		at Oklahoma State	W 64–59	1–0	Gallagher-Iba Arena (5,084); Stillwater, OK
November 10, 2023*; 7:00 p.m., ACCNX/ESPN+		at NC State	L 64–84	1–1	PNC Arena (12,554); Raleigh, NC
November 14, 2023*; 7:00 p.m., ESPN+		Prairie View A&M	L 74–79	1–2	Moody Coliseum (1,895); Abilene, TX
November 17, 2023*; 4:15 p.m., ESPN+		vs. San Jose State; Paradise Jam quarterfinals	W 77–71	2–2	Sports and Fitness Center (524); Saint Thomas, USVI
November 19, 2023*; 4:45 p.m., ESPN+		vs. Fordham; Paradise Jam semifinals	W 59–45	3–2	Sports and Fitness Center; Saint Thomas, USVI
November 20, 2023*; 7:00 p.m., ESPN+		vs. Missouri State; Paradise Jam championship	L 69–87	3–3	Sports and Fitness Center; Saint Thomas, USVI
November 29, 2023; 7:00 p.m., ESPN+		at UT Arlington	L 71–86	3–4 (0–1)	College Park Center (1,275); Arlington, TX
December 2, 2023; 5:00 p.m., ESPN+		Stephen F. Austin	L 74–79 ^{OT}	3–5 (0–2)	Moody Coliseum (1,773); Abilene, TX
December 6, 2023*; 7:00 p.m., ESPN+		Northern Arizona	L 76–78	3–6	Moody Coliseum (1,153); Abilene, TX
December 10, 2023*; 3:00 p.m., ESPN+		Howard Payne	W 120–69	4–6	Moody Coliseum (1,251); Abilene, TX
December 17, 2023*; 3:00 p.m., ESPN+		UTEP; WAC/C-USA Challenge	W 88–82	5–6	Moody Coliseum (1,469); Abilene, TX
December 21, 2023*; 6:00 p.m., SECN		at Arkansas	L 73–83	5–7	Bud Walton Arena (19,200); Fayetteville, AR
December 30, 2023*; 2:00 p.m., ESPN+		at Western Kentucky; WAC/C-USA Challenge	L 84–86	5–8	E. A. Diddle Arena (4,011); Bowling Green, KY
January 6, 2024; 5:00 p.m., ESPN+		UT Rio Grande Valley	W 91–89 ^{OT}	6–8 (1–2)	Moody Coliseum (1,521); Abilene, TX
January 11, 2024; 7:00 p.m., ESPN+		at Grand Canyon	L 64–74	6–9 (1–3)	GCU Arena (7,105); Phoenix, AZ
January 13, 2024; 7:00 p.m., ESPN+		at California Baptist	L 53–68	6–10 (1–4)	CBU Events Center; Riverside, CA
January 18, 2024; 7:00 p.m., ESPN+		at Tarleton	L 71–79	6–11 (1–5)	Wisdom Gym (2,104); Stephenville, TX
January 20, 2024; 3:00 p.m., ESPN+		UT Arlington	W 78–67	7–11 (2–5)	Moody Coliseum (1,541); Abilene, TX
January 25, 2024; 7:00 p.m., ESPN+		Utah Tech	W 82–60	8–11 (3–5)	Moody Coliseum (1,401); Abilene, TX
January 27, 2024; 3:00 p.m., ESPN+		Southern Utah	L 67–82	8–12 (3–6)	Moody Coliseum (1,712); Abilene, TX
February 1, 2024; 7:00 p.m., ESPN+		Tarleton	L 73–76 ^{OT}	8–13 (3–7)	Moody Coliseum (1,652); Abilene, TX
February 8, 2024; 9:00 p.m., ESPN+		at Seattle	L 52–75	8–14 (3–8)	Climate Pledge Arena (2,354); Seattle, WA
February 10, 2024; 3:00 p.m., ESPN+		at Utah Valley	L 45–74	8–15 (3–9)	UCCU Center (2,474); Orem, UT
February 15, 2024; 6:30 p.m., ESPN+		at Texas–Rio Grande Valley	W 87–79	9–15 (4–9)	UTRGV Fieldhouse (2,041); Edinburg, TX
February 17, 2024; 2:00 p.m., ESPN+		at Stephen F. Austin	W 63–62	10–15 (5–9)	William R. Johnson Coliseum (2,887); Nacogdoches, TX
February 22, 2024; 7:00 p.m., ESPN+		California Baptist	W 71–65	11–15 (6–9)	Moody Coliseum (1,323); Abilene, TX
February 24, 2024; 3:00 p.m., ESPN+		Grand Canyon	W 79–73	12–15 (7–9)	Moody Coliseum (1,669); Abilene, TX
February 29, 2024; 7:30 p.m., ESPN+		at Southern Utah	W 77–68	13–15 (8–9)	America First Event Center (828); Cedar City, UT
March 2, 2024; 8:00 p.m., ESPN+		at Utah Tech	W 86–79	14–15 (9–9)	Burns Arena (2,387); St. George, UT
March 7, 2024; 7:00 p.m., ESPN+		Seattle	W 64–59	15–15 (10–9)	Moody Coliseum (1,437); Abilene, TX
March 9, 2024; 3:00 p.m., ESPN+		Utah Valley	L 67–74	15–16 (10–10)	Moody Coliseum (1,817); Abilene, TX
WAC tournament
March 13, 2024; 10:30 p.m., ESPN+	(7)	vs. (6) Stephen F. Austin; First round	L 57–60	15–17	Orleans Arena (1,064); Paradise, NV
CIT
March 19, 2024*; 8:00 p.m., ESPN+		vs. Texas A&M–Corpus Christi; First round – Lou Henson Classic	W 73–63	16–17	Wisdom Gym (615); Stephenville, TX
March 20, 2024*; 6:00 p.m., ESPN+		at Tarleton; Quarterfinals – Lou Henson Classic	L 59–86	16–18	Wisdom Gym (1,576); Stephenville, TX
*Non-conference game. ^{#}Rankings from AP poll. (#) Tournament seedings in parentheses. All times are in Central.
