= 2023–24 Utah Tech Trailblazers men's basketball team =

Basketball team season

2023–24 Utah Tech Trailblazers men's basketball
- Conference: Western Athletic Conference
- Record: 11–20 (7–13 WAC)
- Head coach: Jon Judkins (19th season)
- Associate head coach: Jake Schroeder (5th season)
- Assistant coaches: Anthony Morris (3rd season); Gibson Johnson (2nd season)
- Home arena: Burns Arena

2023–24 WAC men's basketball standings
	Conf.				Overall
Team	W		L	PCT	W		L	PCT
Grand Canyon †	17	–	3	.850	30	–	5	.857
Tarleton *	16	–	4	.800	25	–	10	.714
UT Arlington	13	–	7	.650	20	–	14	.588
Seattle	11	–	9	.550	23	–	14	.622
Utah Valley	11	–	9	.550	16	–	16	.500
Stephen F. Austin	10	–	10	.500	18	–	15	.545
Abilene Christian	10	–	10	.500	16	–	18	.471
California Baptist	8	–	12	.400	16	–	17	.485
Utah Tech *	7	–	13	.350	11	–	20	.355
Southern Utah	5	–	15	.250	10	–	21	.323
UT Rio Grande Valley	2	–	18	.100	6	–	25	.194
† 2024 WAC tournament winner * Ineligible for the NCAA tournament due to transition from Division II

The 2023–24 Utah Tech Trailblazers men's basketball team represented Utah Tech University during the 2023–24 NCAA Division I men's basketball season. The Trailblazers, led by 19th-year head coach Jon Judkins, played their home games at Burns Arena in St. George, Utah as members of the Western Athletic Conference. They finished the season 11–20, 7–13 in WAC play to finish in ninth place, and thus they did not qualify to play in the WAC Tournament.

This season marked Utah Tech's final year of a four-year transition period from Division II to Division I. As a result, the Trailblazers were not eligible to play in the NCAA tournament, but were eligible to play in the WAC tournament.

== Previous season ==
The Trailblazers finished the 2022–23 season 14–19, 5–13 in WAC play, to finish in 12th place. In the first round of the WAC tournament, they upset Stephen F. Austin in overtime, before falling to Southern Utah in the quarterfinals.

== Roster ==
2023–24 Utah Tech Trailblazers men's basketball team
Players
Coaches

Pos.	#	Name	Height	Weight	Year	Previous school	Hometown
G	0	Beon Riley	6 ft 6 in (1.98 m)	225 lb (102 kg)	Jr	Hawaii	Chula Vista, California
G	1	Aric Demings	6 ft 0 in (1.83 m)	180 lb (82 kg)	Fr	Duncanville HS	DeSoto, Texas
G	2	Angelo Kambala	6 ft 0 in (1.83 m)	175 lb (79 kg)	Fr	Liberty HS	Las Vegas, Nevada
F	3	Jaylen Searles	6 ft 8 in (2.03 m)	195 lb (88 kg)	Jr	Southeastern CC	Everett, Washington
G	4	David Elliott	6 ft 3 in (1.91 m)	190 lb (86 kg)	Jr	Garden City CC	Los Angeles, California
F	5	Larry Olayinka	6 ft 9 in (2.06 m)	215 lb (98 kg)	So	Garden City CC	Los Angeles, California
G/F	10	Tennessee Rainwater	6 ft 6 in (1.98 m)	225 lb (102 kg)	Fr	Davenport HS	Davenport, Washington
G	11	Noa Gonsalves	6 ft 1 in (1.85 m)	175 lb (79 kg)	Jr	Lehi HS	Lehi, Utah
G	13	Kade Madsen	6 ft 2 in (1.88 m)	190 lb (86 kg)	RS Fr	Palo Verde HS	Las Vegas, Nevada
F	15	Trey Hall	6 ft 9 in (2.06 m)	210 lb (95 kg)	So	Evansville	Willimantic, Connecticut
F	20	Caleb Stearman	6 ft 7 in (2.01 m)	195 lb (88 kg)	Jr	Benedictine (AZ)	Las Vegas, Nevada
G/F	23	Stone Hutchings	6 ft 5 in (1.96 m)	195 lb (88 kg)	RS Fr	Copper Hills HS	West Jordan, Utah
G	30	Unisa Turay	5 ft 10 in (1.78 m)	165 lb (75 kg)	Jr	Scottsdale CC	Phoenix, Arizona
F/C	32	Tanner Christensen	6 ft 10 in (2.08 m)	275 lb (125 kg)	Jr	Idaho	Spokane Valley, Washington
C	33	Sammy Howlin	6 ft 11 in (2.11 m)	210 lb (95 kg)	Jr	Fullerton College	La Habra, California

Head coach

- Jon Judkins (Utah State)

Assistant coach(es)

- Jake Schroeder (Portland State)
- Gibson Johnson (Hawaiʻi)
- Anthony Morris (Washington)

Legend

- (C) Team captain
- (S) Suspended
- (I) Ineligible
- (W) Walk-on
- Injured
- Current redshirt

Roster
Last update: October 21, 2023

== Schedule and results ==
Date time, TV	Rank^{#}	Opponent^{#}	Result	Record	Site (attendance) city, state
Exhibition
November 1, 2023*; 7:00 pm		Stanton	W 99–40		Burns Arena; St. George, UT
Regular season
November 8, 2023*; 8:00 pm, ESPN+		at Santa Clara	L 69–77	0–1	Leavey Center (1,628); Santa Clara, CA
November 11, 2023*; 1:00 pm, ESPN+		at Jacksonville State; WAC/C-USA Challenge	W 81–79	1–1	Pete Mathews Coliseum (1,123); Jacksonville, AL
November 17, 2023*; 4:30 pm, ESPN+		at Youngstown State; Lake Erie Classic	L 68–75	1–2	Beeghly Center (1,631); Youngstown, OH
November 18, 2023*; 12:00 pm		vs. Lake Erie; Lake Erie Classic	W 81–69	2–2	Beeghly Center (168); Youngstown, OH
November 24, 2023*; 2:00 pm, P12N		at Washington State	L 53–93	2–3	Beasley Coliseum (2,736); Pullman, WA
November 27, 2023*; 6:00 pm, ESPN+		at Lindenwood	W 73–66	3–3	Hyland Performance Arena (747); St. Charles, MO
December 2, 2023; 7:00 pm, ESPN+		Utah Valley	W 65–53	4–3 (1–0)	Burns Arena (2,501); St. George, UT
December 6, 2023; 8:00 pm, ESPN+		at California Baptist	W 72-69	5–3 (2–0)	Fowler Events Center (2,854); Riverside, CA
December 9, 2023*; 7:00 pm, ESPN+		Idaho	L 62–63	5–4	Burns Arena (1,501); St. George, UT
December 11, 2023*; 8:00 pm, ESPN+		at Cal State Northridge	L 75–80	5–5	Premier America Credit Union Arena (438); Northridge, CA
December 16, 2023*; 7:00 pm, ESPN+		North Dakota	L 62–79	5–6	Burns Arena (1,176); St. George, UT
December 21, 2023*; 5:00 pm, P12N		at Colorado	L 71–98	5–7	CU Events Center (6,426); Boulder, CO
December 30, 2023*; 3:00 pm, ESPN+		FIU; WAC/C-USA Challenge	W 96–92 ^{OT}	6–7	Burns Arena (1,213); St. George, UT
January 4, 2024; 8:00 pm, ESPN+		at Seattle	L 53–70	6–8 (2–1)	Redhawk Center (944); Seattle, WA
January 6, 2024; 7:00 pm, ESPN+		Grand Canyon	L 65–75	6–9 (2–2)	Burns Arena (1,492); St. George, UT
January 11, 2024; 7:00 pm, ESPN+		Stephen F. Austin	W 75–70	7–9 (3–2)	Burns Arena (1,658); St. George, UT
January 18, 2024; 6:30 pm, ESPN+		at Southern Utah	L 65–75	7–10 (3–3)	America First Event Center (3,563); Cedar City, UT
January 20, 2024; 2:00 pm, ESPN+		at Utah Valley	L 71–84	7–11 (3–4)	UCCU Center (2,801); Orem, UT
January 25, 2024; 6:00 pm, ESPN+		at Abilene Christian	L 60–82	7–12 (3–5)	Moody Coliseum (1,401); Abilene, TX
January 27, 2024; 6:00 pm, ESPN+		at Tarleton State	L 68–86	7–13 (3–6)	Wisdom Gym (2,110); Stephenville, TX
February 1, 2024; 7:00 pm, ESPN+		UT Rio Grande Valley	W 81–64	8–13 (4–6)	Burns Arena (1,455); St. George, UT
February 3, 2024; 3:00 pm, ESPN+		UT Arlington	L 66–87	8–14 (4–7)	Burns Arena (1,904); St. George, UT
February 8, 2024; 7:00 pm, ESPN+		Southern Utah	W 70–68	9–14 (5–7)	Burns Arena (2,648); St. George, UT
February 10, 2024; 3:00 pm, ESPN+		California Baptist	W 85–78	10–14 (6–7)	Burns Arena (1,682); St. George, UT
February 15, 2024; 7:00 pm, ESPN+		at Grand Canyon	L 61–73	10–15 (6–8)	GCU Arena (7,117); Phoenix, AZ
February 17, 2024; 7:00 pm, ESPN+		Seattle	L 65–66	10–16 (6–9)	Burns Arena (1,739); St. George, UT
February 24, 2024; 1:00 pm, ESPN+		at UT Arlington	L 78–89	10–17 (6–10)	College Park Center (1,781); Arlington, TX
February 29, 2024; 7:00 pm, ESPN+		Tarleton State	L 74–85	10–18 (6–11)	Burns Arena (1,440); St. George, UT
March 2, 2024; 7:00 pm, ESPN+		Abilene Christian	L 79–86	10–19 (6–12)	Burns Arena (2,387); St. George, UT
March 7, 2024; 5:30 pm, ESPN+		at UT Rio Grande Valley	W 79–74	11–19 (7–12)	UTRGV Fieldhouse (857); Edinburg, TX
March 9, 2024; 1:00 p.m., ESPN+		at Stephen F. Austin	L 71–84	11–20 (7–13)	William R. Johnson Coliseum; Nacogdoches, TX
*Non-conference game. ^{#}Rankings from AP poll. (#) Tournament seedings in parentheses. All times are in Mountain Time.
