= 2024 WAC men's basketball tournament =

Postseason men's basketball tournament

- Classification: Division I
- Season: 2023–24
- Teams: 8
- Site: Orleans Arena; Paradise, Nevada
- Champions: Grand Canyon (3rd title)
- Winning coach: Bryce Drew (3rd title)
- Attendance: 10,161 (total); 4,019 (championship)
- Television: ESPN+, ESPN2

2023–24 WAC men's basketball standings
	Conf.				Overall
Team	W		L	PCT	W		L	PCT
Grand Canyon †	17	–	3	.850	30	–	5	.857
Tarleton *	16	–	4	.800	25	–	10	.714
UT Arlington	13	–	7	.650	20	–	14	.588
Seattle	11	–	9	.550	23	–	14	.622
Utah Valley	11	–	9	.550	16	–	16	.500
Stephen F. Austin	10	–	10	.500	18	–	15	.545
Abilene Christian	10	–	10	.500	16	–	18	.471
California Baptist	8	–	12	.400	16	–	17	.485
Utah Tech *	7	–	13	.350	11	–	20	.355
Southern Utah	5	–	15	.250	10	–	21	.323
UT Rio Grande Valley	2	–	18	.100	6	–	25	.194
† 2024 WAC tournament winner * Ineligible for the NCAA tournament due to transition from Division II

The 2024 WAC men's basketball tournament was the postseason men's basketball tournament of the Western Athletic Conference (WAC) for the 2023–24 season. The tournament was played from March 13–16, 2024 at the Orleans Arena in Paradise, Nevada near Las Vegas. The winner, Grand Canyon, received the conference's automatic bid to the NCAA tournament.

== Seeds ==
Eight of the eleven members were invited to the tournament. The field for the WAC tournament has varied from six to 2023's twelve qualifiers. While Tarleton and Utah Tech were ineligible for the NCAA tournament, they were eligible for the WAC tournament. If a team that was not eligible for the NCAA tournament had won the WAC tournament, the conference's automatic bid would have gone to the highest seeded tournament-eligible team. As was the case for the 2023 tournament, teams were seeded based on the WAC Résumé Seeding System. While seeding was determined by the WAC Résumé Seeding System, the eight teams qualifying for the tournament were determined by composite WAC standings.

Seed	School	Conference record	WAC Resume seeding points (final)
1	Grand Canyon	17–3	8.420
2	Tarleton	16–4	4.262
3	UT Arlington	13–7	0.709
4	Seattle	11–9	–0.314
5	Utah Valley	11–9	–1.044
6	Stephen F. Austin	10–10	–1.543
7	Abilene Christian	10–10	–2.692
8	California Baptist	8–12	–4.440
DNQ	Utah Tech	7–13	–6.386
DNQ	Southern Utah	5–15	–7.801
DNQ	UT Rio Grande Valley	2–18	–11.762

=== WAC Resume seedings throughout season ===
Seed	Dec. 4	Dec. 12	Dec. 19	Dec. 27	Jan. 3	Jan. 9	Jan. 16	Jan. 23	Jan. 31	Feb. 6	Feb. 14	Feb. 20	Feb. 26	Mar. 5	Mar. 10 (final)
1	GCU	GCU	GCU	GCU	GCU	GCU	GCU	GCU	GCU	GCU	GCU	GCU	GCU	GCU	GCU
2	TAR	TAR	TAR	TAR	TAR	TAR	TAR	TAR	TAR	TAR	TAR	TAR	TAR	TAR	TAR
3	CBU	UVU	UTA	SU	SU	SU	SFA	SFA	SU	SU	SU	SU	SU	SU	UTA
4	SFA	CBU	CBU	UTA	SFA	UVU	SU	SU	SFA	SFA	SFA	UTA	UTA	UTA	SU
5	UT	SU	UVU	UVU	UTA	SFA	UTA	UTA	CBU	UTA	UTA	SFA	UVU	SFA	UVU
6	UVU	UTA	SFA	CBU	UVU	UTA	UVU	UVU	UTA	CBU	CBU	UVU	SFA	UVU	SFA
7	SU	SFA	SU	SFA	CBU	UT	UT	CBU	UVU	UVU	UVU	CBU	CBU	ACU	ACU
8	UTA	UT	UT	UT	UT	CBU	CBU	UT	SUU	SUU	UT	ACU	ACU	CBU	CBU
9	ACU	ACU	ACU	ACU	ACU	ACU	ACU	ACU	ACU	(T) ACU	SUU	UT	UT	UT	UT
10	SUU	SUU	SUU	SUU	SUU	SUU	SUU	SUU	UT	(T) UT	ACU	SUU	SUU	SUU	SUU
11	UTRGV	UTRGV	UTRGV	UTRGV	UTRGV	UTRGV	UTRGV	UTRGV	UTRGV	UTRGV	UTRGV	UTRGV	UTRGV	UTRGV	UTRGV

== Schedule ==
Session	Game	Time*	Matchup^{#}	Score	Television	Attendance
First round – Wednesday, March 13, 2024 – Orleans Arena
1	1	6:00pm	No. 5 Utah Valley vs. No. 8 California Baptist	63–74^{OT}	ESPN+	1,064
1	2	8:30pm	No. 6 Stephen F. Austin vs. No. 7 Abilene Christian	60–57	ESPN+	1,064
Quarterfinals – Thursday, March 14, 2024 – Orleans Arena
2	3	6:00pm	No. 8 California Baptist vs. No. 4 Seattle	57–81	ESPN+	1,021
2	4	8:30pm	No. 6 Stephen F. Austin vs. No. 3 UT Arlington	78–109	ESPN+	1,021
Semifinals – Friday, March 15, 2024 – Orleans Arena
3	5	6:00pm	No. 4 Seattle vs. No. 1 Grand Canyon	72–80	ESPN+	4,057
3	6	8:30pm	No. 3 UT Arlington vs. No. 2 Tarleton	87–84	ESPNU	4,057
Championship – Saturday, March 16, 2024 – Orleans Arena
4	7	8:30pm	No. 1 Grand Canyon vs. No. 3 UT Arlington	89–74	ESPN2	4,019
*Game times in PT. #-Rankings denote tournament seeding.

== Bracket ==
First round Wednesday, March 13
5	Utah Valley	63
8	California Baptist	74*
6	Stephen F. Austin	60
7	Abilene Christian	57

Quarterfinals; Thursday, March 14
4	Seattle	81
8	California Baptist	57
3	UT Arlington	109
6	Stephen F. Austin	78

Semifinals; Friday, March 15
1	Grand Canyon	80
4	Seattle	72
2	Tarleton	84
3	UT Arlington	87

Championship; Saturday, March 16
1	Grand Canyon	89
3	UT Arlington	74

* denotes overtime period

== Awards ==
Award	Player	Team
Most Outstanding Player	Tyon Grant-Foster	Grand Canyon
All-Tournament Team	Tyon Grant-Foster	Grand Canyon
	Ray Harrison	Grand Canyon
	Lök Wur	Grand Canyon
	Phillip Russell	UT Arlington
	Shemar Wilson	UT Arlington

== See also ==
- 2024 WAC women's basketball tournament
