= 2023–24 California Baptist Lancers men's basketball team =

American college basketball season

2023–24 California Baptist Lancers men's basketball
- Conference: Western Athletic Conference
- Record: 16–17 (8–12 WAC)
- Head coach: Rick Croy (11th season)
- Associate head coach: Hardy Asprilla
- Assistant coaches: Doc Wellman; Reginald Howard; Dave Rice; Dominic Lippi
- Home arena: Fowler Events Center

2023–24 WAC men's basketball standings
	Conf.				Overall
Team	W		L	PCT	W		L	PCT
Grand Canyon †	17	–	3	.850	30	–	5	.857
Tarleton *	16	–	4	.800	25	–	10	.714
UT Arlington	13	–	7	.650	20	–	14	.588
Seattle	11	–	9	.550	23	–	14	.622
Utah Valley	11	–	9	.550	16	–	16	.500
Stephen F. Austin	10	–	10	.500	18	–	15	.545
Abilene Christian	10	–	10	.500	16	–	18	.471
California Baptist	8	–	12	.400	16	–	17	.485
Utah Tech *	7	–	13	.350	11	–	20	.355
Southern Utah	5	–	15	.250	10	–	21	.323
UT Rio Grande Valley	2	–	18	.100	6	–	25	.194
† 2024 WAC tournament winner * Ineligible for the NCAA tournament due to transition from Division II

The 2023–24 California Baptist Lancers men's basketball team represented California Baptist University in the 2023–24 NCAA Division I men's basketball season. They were led by eleventh-year head coach Rick Croy and played their games at Fowler Events Center in Riverside, California as members of the Western Athletic Conference (WAC). They finished the season 16–17, 8–12 in WAC play, to finish in eighth place. As the No. 8 seed in the WAC tournament, they defeated Utah Valley in the first round, before losing to Seattle in the quarterfinals.

== Previous season ==
The Lancers finished the 2022–23 season 17–16, 8–10 in WAC play, to finish in eighth place. In the WAC tournament, the team won their first-round game against Abilene Christian before falling in the quarterfinals to Sam Houston to end their season.

== Roster ==
2023–24 California Baptist Lancers men's basketball team
Players
Coaches

Pos.	#	Name	Height	Weight	Year	Hometown
F	0	Kendal Coleman	6 ft 8 in (2.03 m)	—	Sr	Shreveport, LA
G	1	Dominique Daniels Jr.	5 ft 10 in (1.78 m)	180 lb (82 kg)	So	Compton, CA
G	2	Chris Chiles	6 ft 4 in (1.93 m)	180 lb (82 kg)	So	Elk Grove, CA
G	3	Blondeau Tchoukuiegno	6 ft 2 in (1.88 m)	185 lb (84 kg)	Jr	Montreal, QC
G	4	Bradley Stevenson	6 ft 4 in (1.93 m)	185 lb (84 kg)	Jr	Rancho Cucamonga, CA
F	5	Tasman Goodrick	6 ft 10 in (2.08 m)	235 lb (107 kg)	Fr	Sydney, Australia
F	10	Hunter Goodrick	6 ft 7 in (2.01 m)	225 lb (102 kg)	Jr	Sydney, Australia
G	11	Tyren Riley	6 ft 3 in (1.91 m)	180 lb (82 kg)	Fr	Las Vegas, NV
G/F	12	Scotty Washington	6 ft 4 in (1.93 m)	180 lb (82 kg)	So	Carson, CA
G	13	Brady Cook	6 ft 3 in (1.91 m)	185 lb (84 kg)	RS Fr	Walnut Creek, CA
F	14	Jonathan Griman	6 ft 11 in (2.11 m)	200 lb (91 kg)	Fr	Caracas, Venezuela
F	21	Malik Wade	6 ft 8 in (2.03 m)	235 lb (107 kg)	Jr	Espírito Santo do Pinhal, Brazil
F	23	Zach Wrightsil	6 ft 7 in (2.01 m)	215 lb (98 kg)	GS	Prosper, TX
F	24	Yvan Ouedraogo	6 ft 9 in (2.06 m)	250 lb (113 kg)	Sr	Bordeaux, France
G	32	Tyler Isaak	6 ft 3 in (1.91 m)	185 lb (84 kg)	RS Fr	Alamo, CA

Head coach

- Rick Croy (Azusa Pacific)

Assistant coach(es)

- Hardy Asprilla (Cal State Fullerton)
- Doc Wellman (Azusa Pacific)
- Reginald Howard (UC Riverside)

Legend

- (C) Team captain
- (S) Suspended
- (I) Ineligible
- (W) Walk-on
- Injured
- Current redshirt

Roster
Last update: February 29, 2024

== Schedule and results ==
Date time, TV	Rank^{#}	Opponent^{#}	Result	Record	High points	High rebounds	High assists	Site (attendance) city, state
Regular season
November 6, 2023*; 7:00 p.m.		San Francisco State	W 74–57	1–0	22 – Daniels Jr.	13 – Goodrick	4 – Goodrick	Fowler Events Center (3,290); Riverside, CA
November 10, 2023*; 6:30 p.m.		Jackson State	W 80–66	2–0	25 – Daniels Jr.	12 – Goodrick	5 – Daniels Jr.	Fowler Events Center (5,096); Riverside, CA
November 17, 2023*; 7:00 p.m.		Portland State; The Joust	L 63–66	2–1	18 – Tchoukuiegno	9 – Ouedraogo	4 – Goodrick	Fowler Events Center (2,540); Riverside, CA
November 18, 2023*; 5:00 p.m.		St. Thomas (MN); The Joust	W 66–62	3–1	20 – Tchoukuiegno	9 – Goodrick	4 – Riley	Fowler Events Center (2,034); Riverside, CA
November 19, 2023*; 5:00 p.m.		Cal Poly; The Joust	W 67–58	4–1	26 – Daniels Jr.	16 – Goodrick	3 – Daniels Jr.	Fowler Events Center (2,009); Riverside, CA
November 25, 2023*; 5:00 p.m.		Vanguard	W 69–59	5–1	13 – tied	12 – tied	5 – Tchoukuiegno	Fowler Events Center (2,372); Riverside, CA
December 2, 2023; 5:30 p.m., ESPN+		at Southern Utah	W 91–66	6–1 (1–0)	21 – Washington	9 – Goodrick	4 – Daniels Jr.	America First Event Center (1,181); Cedar City, UT
December 6, 2023; 7:00 p.m., ESPN+		Utah Tech	L 69–72	6–2 (1–1)	30 – Daniels Jr.	11 – Ouedraogo	4 – Daniels Jr.	Fowler Events Center (2,854); Riverside, CA
December 12, 2023*; 7:00 p.m., P12N		at Oregon	L 55–76	6–3	13 – Daniels Jr.	8 – Goodrick	2 – Tchoukuiegno	Matthew Knight Arena (4,582); Eugene, OR
December 16, 2023*; 2:00 p.m.		at UC Riverside	W 70–69	7–3	16 – Daniels Jr.	10 – Ouedraogo	3 – Tchoukuiegno	SRC Arena (669); Riverside, CA
December 19, 2023*; 7:00 p.m.		Western Kentucky; C-USA/WAC Alliance	L 70–73	7–4	32 – Daniels Jr.	11 – Goodrick	2 – tied	Fowler Events Center (2,522); Riverside, CA
December 27, 2023*; 7:00 p.m.		Chicago State	W 74–62	8–4	17 – tied	12 – Ouedraogo	3 – Stevenson	Fowler Events Center (2,518); Riverside, CA
December 30, 2023*; 6:00 p.m., ESPN+		at New Mexico State; C-USA/WAC Alliance	L 61–66	8–5	14 – tied	12 – Coleman	3 – Daniels Jr.	Pan American Center (4,226); Las Cruces, NM
January 4, 2024; 5:00 p.m., ESPN+		at Utah Valley	L 58–65	8–6 (1–2)	20 – Daniels Jr.	13 – Ouedraogo	4 – Tchoukuiegno	UCCU Center (1,553); Orem, UT
January 6, 2024; 3:00 p.m., ESPN+		at Seattle	L 46–48	8–7 (1–3)	9 – tied	7 – tied	2 – Daniels Jr.	Redhawk Center (795); Seattle, WA
January 11, 2024; 7:00 p.m., ESPN+		Tarleton State	W 77–63	9–7 (2–3)	17 – Daniels Jr.	13 – Ouedraogo	6 – Daniels Jr.	Fowler Events Center (3,676); Riverside, CA
January 13, 2024; 5:00 p.m., ESPN+		Abilene Christian	W 68–53	10–7 (3–3)	19 – Daniels Jr.	8 – Goodrick	5 – Daniels Jr.	Fowler Events Center; Riverside, CA
January 20, 2024; 5:00 p.m., ESPN+		Southern Utah	W 83–76	11–7 (4–3)	39 – Daniels Jr.	8 – tied	4 – Ouedraogo	Fowler Events Center (3,197); Riverside, CA
January 25, 2024; 4:30 p.m., ESPN+		at UT Rio Grande Valley	W 63–54	12–7 (5–3)	14 – Goodrick	12 – Goodrick	5 – Daniels Jr.	UTRGV Fieldhouse (1,932); Edinburg, TX
January 27, 2024; 12:00 p.m., ESPN+		at Stephen F. Austin	W 81–79	13–7 (6–3)	29 – Daniels Jr.	8 – Coleman	4 – tied	William R. Johnson Coliseum (2,909); Nacogdoches, TX
February 3, 2024; 5:00 p.m., ESPN+		Seattle	L 60–61	13–8 (6–4)	26 – Daniels Jr.	16 – Goodrick	5 – Goodrick	Fowler Events Center (4,822); Riverside, CA
February 8, 2024; 7:00 p.m., ESPN+		UT Arlington	W 64–63	14–8 (7–4)	20 – Washington	9 – Ouedraogo	4 – tied	Fowler Events Center (2,550); Riverside, CA
February 10, 2024; 2:00 p.m., ESPN+		at Utah Tech	L 78–85	14–9 (7–5)	20 – Washington	6 – tied	5 – Tchoukuiegno	Burns Arena (1,682); St. George, UT
February 15, 2024; 7:00 p.m., ESPN+		Utah Valley	L 46–69	14–10 (7–6)	12 – Coleman	10 – Coleman	3 – Tchoukuiegno	Fowler Events Center (2,230); Riverside, CA
February 17, 2024; 5:00 p.m., ESPN+		at Grand Canyon	L 76–79	14–11 (7–7)	23 – Tchoukuiegno	7 – tied	5 – Tchoukuiegno	GCU Arena (7,268); Phoenix, AZ
February 22, 2024; 5:00 p.m., ESPN+		Abilene Christian	L 65–71	14–12 (7–8)	15 – Washington	8 – Ouedraogo	3 – Tchoukuiegno	Moody Coliseum (1,323); Abilene, TX
February 24, 2024; 2:00 p.m., ESPN+		at Tarleton State	L 65–82	14–13 (7–9)	17 – Tchoukuiegno	7 – tied	5 – Tchoukuiegno	Wisdom Gymnasium (2,276); Stephenville, TX
February 29, 2024; 7:00 p.m., ESPN+		Stephen F. Austin	L 60–62 ^{OT}	14–14 (7–10)	19 – Washington	16 – Coleman	5 – Tchoukuiegno	Fowler Events Center (2,111); Riverside, CA
March 2, 2024; 5:00 p.m., ESPN+		UT Rio Grande Valley	W 88–52	15–14 (8–10)	20 – Washington	11 – Goodrick	7 – Tchoukuiegno	Fowler Events Center (2,550); Riverside, CA
March 7, 2024; 4:30 p.m., ESPN+		at UT Arlington	L 57–71	15–15 (8–11)	17 – tied	11 – Coleman	3 – Tchoukuiegno	College Park Center (1,871); Arlington, TX
March 9, 2024; 5:00 p.m., ESPN+		Grand Canyon	L 47–68	15–16 (8–12)	14 – Stevenson	18 – Ouedraogo	6 – Tchoukuiegno	Fowler Events Center (5,363); Riverside, CA
WAC tournament
March 13, 2024; 6:00 p.m., ESPN+	(8)	vs. (5) Utah Valley; First round	W 74–63 ^{OT}	16–16	21 – Tchoukuiegno	9 – tied	10 – Tchoukuiegno	Orleans Arena; Paradise, NV
March 14, 2024; 6:00 p.m., ESPN+	(8)	vs. (4) Seattle; Quarterfinals	L 57–81	16–17	15 – Ouedraogo	8 – Goodrick	7 – Tchoukuiegno	Orleans Arena (1,106); Paradise, NV
*Non-conference game. ^{#}Rankings from AP poll. (#) Tournament seedings in parentheses. All times are in Pacific.
