= 2023–24 Southern Utah Thunderbirds men's basketball team =

American college basketball season

2023–24 Southern Utah Thunderbirds men's basketball
- Conference: Western Athletic Conference
- Record: 10–21 (5–15 WAC)
- Head coach: Rob Jeter (1st season)
- Associate head coach: Donald Williams
- Assistant coaches: Allan Hanson; Shaun Gutting
- Home arena: America First Event Center

2023–24 WAC men's basketball standings
	Conf.				Overall
Team	W		L	PCT	W		L	PCT
Grand Canyon †	17	–	3	.850	30	–	5	.857
Tarleton *	16	–	4	.800	25	–	10	.714
UT Arlington	13	–	7	.650	20	–	14	.588
Seattle	11	–	9	.550	23	–	14	.622
Utah Valley	11	–	9	.550	16	–	16	.500
Stephen F. Austin	10	–	10	.500	18	–	15	.545
Abilene Christian	10	–	10	.500	16	–	18	.471
California Baptist	8	–	12	.400	16	–	17	.485
Utah Tech *	7	–	13	.350	11	–	20	.355
Southern Utah	5	–	15	.250	10	–	21	.323
UT Rio Grande Valley	2	–	18	.100	6	–	25	.194
† 2024 WAC tournament winner * Ineligible for the NCAA tournament due to transition from Division II

The 2023–24 Southern Utah Thunderbirds men's basketball team represented Southern Utah University in the 2023–24 NCAA Division I men's basketball season. They were led by first-year head coach Rob Jeter and played their games at America First Event Center as members of the Western Athletic Conference (WAC). They finished the season 10–21, 5–15 in WAC play, to finish in tenth place, and thus they did not qualify to play in the WAC tournament.

== Previous season ==
The Thunderbirds finished the 2022–23 season 24–13, 12–6 in WAC play, to finish in third place. In the WAC tournament, the team won their first two games against Utah Tech and Utah Valley before falling to Grand Canyon in the championship. The Thunderbirds were invited to appear in the College Basketball Invitational where they defeated North Alabama and Rice to advance to the semifinals. They were defeated by Eastern Kentucky to end their season.

On March 15, head coach Todd Simon accepted the same position at Bowling Green; assistant coach Flynn Clayman served as interim head coach during the College Basketball Invitational. On April 7, it was announced that Western Illinois head coach Rob Jeter would be named the school's next head coach.

== Roster ==
2023–24 Southern Utah Thunderbirds men's basketball team
Players
Coaches

Pos.	#	Name	Height	Weight	Year	Previous school	Hometown
G	0	Donavhan Cain	6 ft 4 in (1.93 m)	—	Fr	Link Prep	Beloit, WI
SG	1	Dominique Ford	6 ft 5 in (1.96 m)	196 lb (89 kg)	Jr	Idaho	Las Vegas, NV
SG	2	Harrison Reede	6 ft 1 in (1.85 m)	—	Fr	Phhoenix Prep	Aberdeen, SD
G/F	3	Jamir Simpson	6 ft 5 in (1.96 m)	205 lb (93 kg)	Jr	Wisconsin–Parkside	Lima, OH
PG	4	Braden Housley	6 ft 4 in (1.93 m)	180 lb (82 kg)	RS Fr	Skyridge High School	Lehi, UT
PF	5	Chazz Hutchison	6 ft 8 in (2.03 m)	215 lb (98 kg)	RS Sr	UC Irvine	Mission Viejo, CA
F	12	Mason Johnson	6 ft 6 in (1.98 m)	—	Jr	Milwaukee Area Technical College	Milwaukee, WI
PG	13	Tainui Taiaroa	6 ft 7 in (2.01 m)	—	Fr	ABC Prep	Las Cruces, NM
F	14	Jamari Sibley	6 ft 8 in (2.03 m)	185 lb (84 kg)	Jr	UTEP	Milwaukee, WI
G	15	Peter Jr. Dadson	6 ft 4 in (1.93 m)	—	So	Hillcrest Prep	Sydney, Australia
PG	16	Prophet Johnson	6 ft 3 in (1.91 m)	—	So	Bellevue College	Dayton, OH
PG	21	Robert Jeter	6 ft 0 in (1.83 m)	180 lb (82 kg)	Jr	Western Illinois	Madison, WI
PF	22	Parsa Fallah	6 ft 9 in (2.06 m)	250 lb (113 kg)	So	Kouchin Amol	Amol, Iran
SG	23	Duncan Reid	6 ft 4 in (1.93 m)	—	Fr	Skyridge High School	Highland, UT
F	24	Nestor Dyachok	6 ft 9 in (2.06 m)	—	So	Casper College	Moscow, Russia
SG	25	Zion Young	6 ft 4 in (1.93 m)	220 lb (100 kg)	RS Sr	Oakland	Chicago, IL
PF	33	Brock Felder	6 ft 8 in (2.03 m)	—	Fr	Parowan High School	Parowan, UT
PG	55	Hayden Ledbetter	5 ft 11 in (1.8 m)	—	So	Casper College	Memphis, TN

Head coach

- Rob Jeter (UW–Platteville)

Assistant coach(es)

- Donald Williams (Cal State Hayward)
- Allan Hanson (Milwaukee)
- Shaun Gutting (Colorado State)

Legend

- (C) Team captain
- (S) Suspended
- (I) Ineligible
- (W) Walk-on
- Injured
- Current redshirt

Roster
Last update: December 8, 2023

== Schedule and results ==
Date time, TV	Rank^{#}	Opponent^{#}	Result	Record	High points	High rebounds	High assists	Site (attendance) city, state
Exhibition
October 23, 2023*; 6:30 p.m.		Westminster	W 98–66	–	– –	– –	– –	America First Event Center; Cedar City, UT
Regular season
November 6, 2023*; 8:00 p.m., ESPN+		at Cal State Bakersfield	L 72–73	0–1	22 – Housley	8 – Johnson	3 – 3 tied	Icardo Center (1,067); Bakersfield, CA
November 9, 2023*; 6:30 p.m., ESPN+		Life Pacific	W 108–73	1–1	22 – Johnson	8 – Fallah	4 – Fallah	America First Event Center (1,461); Cedar City, UT
November 14, 2023*; 7:00 p.m., MW Network		at Utah State	L 84–93	1–2	24 – Johnson	5 – 2 tied	4 – Ford	Smith Spectrum (7,112); Logan, UT
November 21, 2023*; 2:00 p.m., ESPN+		at Louisiana Tech; Louisiana Tech MTE & C-USA/WAC Alliance	L 53–67	1–3	19 – Young	8 – Young	4 – Ford	Thomas Assembly Center (2,013); Ruston, LA
November 22, 2023*; 11:00 a.m., ESPN+		vs. Texas State; Louisiana Tech MTE	W 74–67	2–3	25 – Young	7 – 2 tied	5 – Ford	Thomas Assembly Center (103); Ruston, LA
November 29, 2023; 6:30 p.m., ESPN+		California Baptist	L 66–91	2–4 (0–1)	16 – Ford	7 – Fallah	2 – Ford	America First Event Center (1,181); Cedar City, UT
December 2, 2023; 4:00 p.m., ESPN+		at Seattle	L 63–73	2–5 (0–2)	14 – Young	5 – 2 tied	6 – Housley	Redhawk Center (943); Seattle, WA
December 5, 2023*; 6:00 p.m., P12N		at Utah	L 86–88	2–6	23 – 2 tied	5 – Housley	5 – 2 tied	Jon M. Huntsman Center (7,161); Salt Lake City, UT
December 9, 2023*; 6:30 p.m., ESPN+		Idaho State	W 82–74	3–6	29 – Fallah	7 – Fallah	7 – Housley	America First Event Center (1,326); Cedar City, UT
December 16, 2023*; 2:00 p.m., ESPN+		at Northern Arizona	L 74–76	3–7	19 – Ford	12 – Fallah	5 – Ford	Rolle Activity Center; Flagstaff, AZ
December 19, 2023*; 7:00 p.m., ESPN+		at Montana State	L 88–89 ^{OT}	3–8	25 – Ford	10 – Fallah	3 – 2 tied	Worthington Arena (2,229); Bozeman, MT
December 22, 2023*; 6:30 p.m., ESPN+		Middle Tennessee; C-USA/WAC Alliance	W 69–63	4–8	20 – Fallah	9 – Fallah	3 – 2 tied	America First Event Center (1,335); Cedar City, UT
December 30, 2023*; 6:30 p.m., ESPN+		Antelope Valley	W 95–78	5–8	22 – Housley	13 – Johnson	6 – Housley	America First Event Center (886); Cedar City, UT
January 4, 2024; 6:30 p.m., ESPN+		Grand Canyon	L 75–96	5–9 (0–3)	24 – Fallah	8 – Housley	5 – Johnson	America First Event Center (1,007); Cedar City, UT
January 6, 2024; 2:00 p.m., ESPN+		at Utah Valley	L 62–80	5–10 (0–4)	17 – Young	7 – Felder	4 – Housley	UCCU Center (2,163); Orem, UT
January 13, 2024; 6:30 p.m., ESPN+		Stephen F. Austin	L 82–84	5–11 (0–5)	20 – Ford	6 – Sibley	7 – Housley	America First Event Center (1,809); Cedar City, UT
January 18, 2024; 6:30 p.m., ESPN+		Utah Tech	W 75–65	6–11 (1–5)	23 – 2 tied	15 – Fallah	3 – Johnson	America First Event Center (3,563); Cedar City, UT
January 20, 2024; 6:00 p.m., ESPN+		at California Baptist	L 76–83	6–12 (1–6)	28 – Ford	9 – Hutchison	4 – Housley	Fowler Events Center (3,197); Riverside, CA
January 25, 2024; 6:00 p.m., ESPN+		at Tarleton State	W 73–70	7–12 (2–6)	23 – Ford	6 – Young	5 – Housley	Wisdom Gymnasium (1,677); Stephenville, TX
January 27, 2024; 2:00 p.m., ESPN+		at Abilene Christian	W 82–67	8–12 (3–6)	23 – Ford	7 – Sibley	3 – 2 tied	Moody Coliseum (1,712); Abilene, TX
February 1, 2024; 6:30 p.m., ESPN+		UT Arlington	L 68–76	8–13 (3–7)	16 – 2 tied	7 – Young	4 – Housley	America First Event Center (1,422); Cedar City, UT
February 3, 2024; 6:30 p.m., ESPN+		UT Rio Grande Valley	W 79–59	9–13 (4–7)	20 – Young	8 – 3 tied	6 – Johnson	America First Event Center (1,352); Cedar City, UT
February 8, 2024; 7:00 p.m., ESPN+		at Utah Tech	L 68–70	9–14 (4–8)	17 – Young	7 – Housley	2 – 3 tied	Burns Arena (2,648); St. George, UT
February 10, 2024; 7:00 p.m., ESPN+		at Grand Canyon	L 65–94	9–15 (4–9)	23 – Ford	6 – Hutchison	1 – 5 tied	GCU Arena (7,124); Phoenix, AZ
February 15, 2024; 6:30 p.m., ESPN+		Seattle	L 68–78	9–16 (4–10)	17 – Sibley	7 – Sibley	5 – Ford	America First Event Center (1,175); Cedar City, UT
February 17, 2024; 6:30 p.m., ESPN+		Utah Valley	L 75–78	9–17 (4–11)	19 – Fallah	10 – Sibley	8 – Housley	America First Event Center (1,613); Cedar City, UT
February 22, 2024; 6:00 p.m., ESPN+		at UT Arlington	L 85–90	9–18 (4–12)	24 – Ford	7 – Sibley	4 – Young	College Park Center (1,622); Arlington, TX
February 29, 2024; 6:30 p.m., ESPN+		Abilene Christian	L 68–77	9–19 (4–13)	19 – Young	5 – Johnson	4 – Fallah	America First Event Center (828); Cedar City, UT
March 2, 2024; 6:30 p.m., ESPN+		Tarleton State	L 83–88	9–20 (4–14)	29 – Young	9 – Hutchison	4 – Jeter IV	America First Event Center (1,119); Cedar City, UT
March 7, 2024; 5:30 p.m., ESPN+		at Stephen F. Austin	L 60–87	9–21 (4–15)	14 – Sibley	9 – Sibley	5 – Housley	William R. Johnson Coliseum (1,507); Nacogdoches, TX
March 9, 2024; 5:30 p.m., ESPN+		at UT Rio Grande Valley	W 68–59	10–21 (5–15)	15 – tied	7 – Felder	8 – Housley	UTRGV Fieldhouse (652); Edinburg, TX
*Non-conference game. ^{#}Rankings from AP poll. (#) Tournament seedings in parentheses. All times are in Mountain.
