= 2023–24 UT Rio Grande Valley Vaqueros men's basketball team =

American college basketball team

2023–24 UT Rio Grande Valley Vaqueros men's basketball
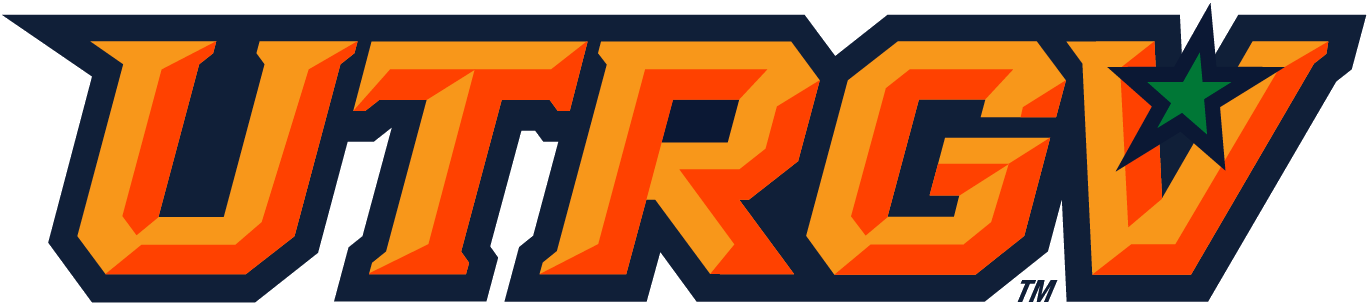
- Conference: Western Athletic Conference
- Record: 6–25 (2–18 WAC)
- Head coach: Matt Figger (3rd season)
- Assistant coaches: Nikita Johnson; Brandon Espinosa; Tyler Guidry
- Home arena: UTRGV Fieldhouse

2023–24 WAC men's basketball standings
	Conf.				Overall
Team	W		L	PCT	W		L	PCT
Grand Canyon †	17	–	3	.850	30	–	5	.857
Tarleton *	16	–	4	.800	25	–	10	.714
UT Arlington	13	–	7	.650	20	–	14	.588
Seattle	11	–	9	.550	23	–	14	.622
Utah Valley	11	–	9	.550	16	–	16	.500
Stephen F. Austin	10	–	10	.500	18	–	15	.545
Abilene Christian	10	–	10	.500	16	–	18	.471
California Baptist	8	–	12	.400	16	–	17	.485
Utah Tech *	7	–	13	.350	11	–	20	.355
Southern Utah	5	–	15	.250	10	–	21	.323
UT Rio Grande Valley	2	–	18	.100	6	–	25	.194
† 2024 WAC tournament winner * Ineligible for the NCAA tournament due to transition from Division II

The 2023–24 UT Rio Grande Valley Vaqueros men's basketball team represented the University of Texas Rio Grande Valley (UTRGV) in the 2023–24 NCAA Division I men's basketball season. They were led by third-year head coach Matt Figger and played home games at UTRGV Fieldhouse as members of the Western Athletic Conference (WAC). They finished the season 6–25, 2–18 in WAC play, to finish in eleventh place, and thus did not qualify to play in the WAC tournament.

This was UTRGV's last season in the WAC, and also Figger's last as head coach. UTRGV announced on March 19, 2024 that it had fired Figger, who left with a 29–65 record after three seasons. Less than a week later, UTRGV announced that it would join the Southland Conference effective that July.

== Previous season ==
The Vaqueros finished the season 15–16, 6–12 in WAC play, to finish in a tie for tenth place. They were defeated by Tarleton State in the first round of the WAC tournament to end their season.

== Roster ==
2023–24 Texas–Rio Grande Valley Vaqueros men's basketball team
Players
Coaches

Pos.	#	Name	Height	Weight	Year	Hometown
G	0	J.J. Howard	6 ft 5 in (1.96 m)	188 lb (85 kg)	Fr	San Luis Obispo, CA
G	1	Elijah Elliott	6 ft 1 in (1.85 m)	171 lb (78 kg)	Jr	Houston, TX
G/F	2	C.J. Jackson	6 ft 7 in (2.01 m)	190 lb (86 kg)	Sr	Atlanta, GA
G	3	DeAnthony Jr. Tipler	5 ft 10 in (1.78 m)	176 lb (80 kg)	GS	Ashland, MS
G	4	C.J. Booker	5 ft 10 in (1.78 m)	145 lb (66 kg)	RS Fr	Arlington, TX
G	5	Howie Jr. Fleming	6 ft 5 in (1.96 m)	217 lb (98 kg)	Jr	Louisville, KY
G	10	Roy III Jones	5 ft 10 in (1.78 m)	217 lb (98 kg)	RS Jr	Pensacola, FL
F	11	Ahren Freeman	6 ft 7 in (2.01 m)	230 lb (104 kg)	Sr	Jacksonville, FL
G	12	Fadi Mougharbel	6 ft 3 in (1.91 m)	199 lb (90 kg)	RS So	Beirut, Lebanon
G	13	Sherman Brashear	6 ft 5 in (1.96 m)	188 lb (85 kg)	Jr	Rockwall, TX
G	14	Hasan Abdul-Hakim	6 ft 8 in (2.03 m)	206 lb (93 kg)	Jr	Toronto, ON
F	15	Daylen Williams	6 ft 8 in (2.03 m)	204 lb (93 kg)	Sr	Los Angeles, CA
F	21	Alex Horiuk	7 ft 0 in (2.13 m)	244 lb (111 kg)	So	Chernivtsi, Ukraine
F	23	Isaiah Barganier	6 ft 7 in (2.01 m)	245 lb (111 kg)	So	Fulshear, TX
F	33	John II Shanu	6 ft 11 in (2.11 m)	255 lb (116 kg)	So	Houston, TX
F	35	Saliou Seye	7 ft 0 in (2.13 m)	218 lb (99 kg)	So	Dakar, Senegal
F	44	David Oyona Ibandzo	6 ft 10 in (2.08 m)	240 lb (109 kg)	Fr	Pointe-Noire, Republic of the Congo

Head coach

- Matt Figger (Eastern Kentucky)

Assistant coach(es)

- Nikita Johnson (West Georgia)
- Brandon Espinosa (Dallas Christian)
- Tyler Guidry (Southwestern Assemblies of God)

Legend

- (C) Team captain
- (S) Suspended
- (I) Ineligible
- (W) Walk-on
- Injured
- Current redshirt

Roster
Last update: October 20, 2023

== Schedule and results ==
Date time, TV	Rank^{#}	Opponent^{#}	Result	Record	High points	High rebounds	High assists	Site (attendance) city, state
Regular season
November 6, 2023*; 6:30 p.m., ESPN+		Southwestern Adventist	W 110–59	1–0	20 – Williams	11 – Abdul-Hakim	7 – 2 tied	UTRGV Fieldhouse (1,622); Edinburg, TX
November 10, 2023*; 7:00 p.m.		vs. South Dakota	L 79–100	1–1	30 – Elliott	11 – Freeman	7 – Abdul-Hakim	Sanford Pentagon (1,884); Sioux Falls, SD
November 14, 2023*; 7:00 p.m., Big 12 Now		at TCU	L 55–88	1–2	19 – Elliott	5 – Freeman	8 – Abdul-Hakim	Schollmaier Arena (5,438); Fort Worth, TX
November 17, 2023*; 7:00 p.m., Big 12 Now		at Oklahoma	L 66–90	1–3	15 – Elliott	10 – Williams	3 – Abdul-Hakim	Lloyd Noble Center (4,686); Norman, OK
November 20, 2023*; 6:30 p.m., ESPN+		North American	W 92–73	2–3	20 – Brashear	12 – Williams	8 – Abdul-Hakim	UTRGV Fieldhouse (644); Edinburg, TX
November 24, 2023*; 7:00 p.m.		vs. Hawaii; Acrisure Invitational semifinals	L 57–76	2–4	18 – Elliott	13 – Freeman	2 – Elliott	Acrisure Arena (735); Thousand Palms, CA
November 25, 2023*; 7:00 p.m.		vs. Arkansas State; Acrisure Invitational 3rd-place game	L 58–75	2–5	16 – Howard	6 – Williams	3 – Booker	Acrisure Arena (893); Thousand Palms, CA
November 29, 2023; 6:30 p.m., ESPN+		Grand Canyon	L 69–79	2–6 (0–1)	21 – Abdul-Hakim	8 – Abdul-Hakim	3 – 3 tied	UTRGV Fieldhouse (1944); Edinburg, TX
December 2, 2023; 4:00 p.m., ESPN+		at Tarleton State	L 75–77	2–7 (0–2)	23 – Abdul-Hakim	7 – Abdul-Hakim	4 – Elliott	Wisdom Gymnasium; Stephenville, TX
December 6, 2023*; 7:00 p.m., ESPN+		at Texas A&M–Corpus Christi; South Texas Showdown	W 76–74	3–7	23 – Freeman	7 – Freeman	5 – Elliott	American Bank Center (2,296); Corpus Christi, TX
December 15, 2023*; 6:30 p.m., ESPN+		Texas A&M–Corpus Christi; South Texas Showdown	L 76–86	3–8	23 – Abdul-Hakim	7 – Freeman	6 – Booker	UTRGV Fieldhouse (1,012); Edinburg, TX
December 18, 2023*; 7:00 p.m.		at Chicago State	L 68–78	3–9	17 – Elliott	7 – Williams	3 – Booker	Jones Convocation Center (72); Chicago, IL
December 30, 2023*; 6:30 p.m., ESPN+		Incarnate Word	W 77–74	4–9	21 – Elliott	14 – Williams	4 – Abdul-Hakim	UTRGV Fieldhouse (718); Edinburg, TX
January 4, 2024; 12:00 p.m., ESPN+		at Stephen F. Austin	L 78–85	4–10 (0–3)	26 – Freeman	11 – Freeman	7 – Abdul-Hakim	UTRGV Fieldhouse (1,031); Edinburg, TX
January 6, 2024; 5:00 p.m., ESPN+		at Abilene Christian	L 89–91 ^{OT}	4–11 (0–4)	26 – Abdul-Hakim	9 – Williams	8 – Elliott	Moody Coliseum (1,521); Abilene, TX
January 11, 2024; 6:30 p.m., ESPN+		Seattle	W 81–80 ^{OT}	5–11 (1–4)	22 – Freeman	10 – Freeman	4 – Abdul-Hakim	UTRGV Fieldhouse (591); Edinburg, TX
January 13, 2024; 6:30 p.m., ESPN+		Utah Valley	W 76–68	6–11 (2–4)	14 – 3 tied	6 – Williams	5 – Elliott	UTRGV Fieldhouse (1,015); Edinburg, TX
January 18, 2024; 7:00 p.m., ESPN+		at UT Arlington	L 73–91	6–12 (2–5)	22 – Elliott	7 – Elliott	4 – Elliott	College Park Center (1,824); Arlington, TX
January 20, 2024; 6:30 p.m., ESPN+		Tarleton State	L 73–77	6–13 (2–6)	23 – Elliott	8 – Williams	7 – Freeman	UTRGV Fieldhouse (1,514); Edinburg, TX
January 25, 2024; 6:30 p.m., ESPN+		California Baptist	L 54–63	6–14 (2–7)	18 – Howard	7 – Seye	2 – 2 tied	UTRGV Fieldhouse (1,932); Edinburg, TX
February 1, 2024; 8:00 p.m., ESPN+		at Utah Tech	L 64–81	6–15 (2–8)	19 – Howard	4 – Horiuk	2 – Howard	Burns Arena (1,455); St. George, UT
February 3, 2024; 7:30 p.m., ESPN+		at Southern Utah	L 59–79	6–16 (2–9)	18 – Elliott	7 – 2 tied	2 – Jones III	America First Event Center (1,352); Cedar City, UT
February 8, 2024; 7:00 p.m., ESPN+		at Stephen F. Austin	L 84–92	6–17 (2–10)	40 – Elliott	10 – Williams	4 – Williams	William R. Johnson Coliseum (2,120); Nacogdoches, TX
February 15, 2024; 6:30 p.m., ESPN+		Abilene Christian	L 79–87	6–18 (2–11)	24 – Williams	7 – Abdul-Hakim	6 – Elliott	UTRGV Fieldhouse (2,041); Edinburg, TX
February 17, 2024; 6:30 p.m., ESPN+		UT Arlington	L 70–89	6–19 (2–12)	15 – Brashear	6 – Williams	4 – Williams	UTRGV Fieldhouse (2,766); Edinberg, TX
February 22, 2024; 7:00 p.m., ESPN+		at Utah Valley	L 59–70	6–20 (2–13)	17 – Williams	11 – Williams	5 – 2 tied	UCCU Center (2,601); Orem, UT
February 24, 2024; 5:00 p.m., ESPN+		at Seattle	L 56–84	6–21 (2–14)	23 – Elliott	12 – Williams	3 – Williams	Redhawk Center (926); Seattle, WA
February 29, 2024; 8:00 p.m., ESPN+		at Grand Canyon	L 43–72	6–22 (2–15)	12 – Elliott	8 – Elliott	2 – 2 tied	GCU Arena (7,192); Phoenix, AZ
March 2, 2024; 7:00 p.m., ESPN+		at California Baptist	L 52–88	6–23 (2–16)	21 – Williams	9 – Williams	3 – Seye	Fowler Events Center (2,550); Riverside, CA
March 7, 2024; 6:30 p.m., ESPN+		Utah Tech	L 74–79	6–24 (2–17)	26 – Elliott	13 – Williams	6 – Elliott	UTRGV Fieldhouse (857); Edinburg, TX
March 9, 2024; 6:30 p.m., ESPN+		Southern Utah	L 59–68	6–25 (2–18)	24 – Elliott	11 – Williams	4 – tied	UTRGV Fieldhouse (652); Edinburg, TX
*Non-conference game. ^{#}Rankings from AP poll. (#) Tournament seedings in parentheses. All times are in Central.
