= 2023–24 UT Arlington Mavericks men's basketball team =

American college basketball season

2023–24 UT Arlington Mavericks men's basketball
- Conference: Western Athletic Conference
- Record: 20–14 (13–7 WAC)
- Head coach: K. T. Turner (1st season)
- Associate head coach: Sean Stout
- Assistant coaches: Jeremy Pope; Keith Pickens
- Home arena: College Park Center

2023–24 WAC men's basketball standings
	Conf.				Overall
Team	W		L	PCT	W		L	PCT
Grand Canyon †	17	–	3	.850	30	–	5	.857
Tarleton *	16	–	4	.800	25	–	10	.714
UT Arlington	13	–	7	.650	20	–	14	.588
Seattle	11	–	9	.550	23	–	14	.622
Utah Valley	11	–	9	.550	16	–	16	.500
Stephen F. Austin	10	–	10	.500	18	–	15	.545
Abilene Christian	10	–	10	.500	16	–	18	.471
California Baptist	8	–	12	.400	16	–	17	.485
Utah Tech *	7	–	13	.350	11	–	20	.355
Southern Utah	5	–	15	.250	10	–	21	.323
UT Rio Grande Valley	2	–	18	.100	6	–	25	.194
† 2024 WAC tournament winner * Ineligible for the NCAA tournament due to transition from Division II

The 2023–24 UT Arlington Mavericks men's basketball team represented the University of Texas Arlington in the 2023–24 NCAA Division I men's basketball season. They were led by first-year head coach K. T. Turner and played their games at College Park Center in Arlington, Texas as members of the Western Athletic Conference (WAC).

They finished the season 20–14, 13–7 in WAC play to finish in third place. As the No. 3 seed in the WAC tournament, they defeated Stephen F. Austin in the quarterfinals and Tarleton in the semifinals, before losing to Grand Canyon in the championship game.

== Previous season ==
The Mavericks finished the 2022–23 season 11–18, 6–12 in WAC play, to finish in a tie for tenth place. They were defeated by Grand Canyon in the first round of the WAC tournament to end their season. Head coach Greg Young was fired mid-season after only a season and a half with the program.

== Roster ==
2023–24 UT Arlington Mavericks men's basketball team
Players
Coaches

Pos.	#	Name	Height	Weight	Year	Hometown
G	00	Aaron Cash	6 ft 6 in (1.98 m)	210 lb (95 kg)	GS	San Francisco, CA
G	1	Phillip Russell	5 ft 10 in (1.78 m)	165 lb (75 kg)	Jr	St. Louis, MO
G	2	Makaih Williams	6 ft 1 in (1.85 m)	185 lb (84 kg)	Fr	Long Beach, CA
G	3	DaJuan Gordon	6 ft 5 in (1.96 m)	195 lb (88 kg)	GS	Chicago, IL
G	4	Akili Vining	6 ft 2 in (1.88 m)	185 lb (84 kg)	GS	Fort Worth, TX
G	5	Brandyn Talbot	6 ft 5 in (1.96 m)	185 lb (84 kg)	Jr	Toronto, ON
F	11	Dwayne Koroma	6 ft 8 in (2.03 m)	205 lb (93 kg)	RS So	Berlin, Germany
F	12	Freds Pauls Bagatskis	6 ft 8 in (2.03 m)	180 lb (82 kg)	So	Riga, Latvia
G	13	Kade Douglas	6 ft 2 in (1.88 m)	170 lb (77 kg)	RS Fr	Lancaster, TX
F	22	Shemar Wilson	6 ft 9 in (2.06 m)	215 lb (98 kg)	Sr	Avondale, AZ
G	23	Sterling Gaston-Chapman	6 ft 4 in (1.93 m)	218 lb (99 kg)	Jr	Wichita, KS
C	24	Darrius Miles	6 ft 10 in (2.08 m)	250 lb (113 kg)	RS So	Oak Cliff, TX
G	30	Fabio Basili	6 ft 4 in (1.93 m)	275 lb (125 kg)	So	Orlando, FL

Head coach

- K. T. Turner (Oklahoma City)

Assistant coach(es)

- Sean Stout (North Carolina)
- Jeremy Pope (Biola)
- Keith Pickens (Missouri State)

Legend

- (C) Team captain
- (S) Suspended
- (I) Ineligible
- (W) Walk-on
- Injured
- Current redshirt

Roster
Last update: October 21, 2024

== Schedule and results ==
Date time, TV	Rank^{#}	Opponent^{#}	Result	Record	High points	High rebounds	High assists	Site (attendance) city, state
Regular season
November 6, 2023*; 7:00 p.m., ESPN+		Oral Roberts	W 75–71	1–0	24 – Gordon	14 – 2 tied	6 – Talbot	College Park Center (2,185); Arlington, TX
November 11, 2023*; 5:00 p.m.		UT Tyler	W 95–64	2–0	18 – Douglas	11 – Gordon	6 – Williams	College Park Center (2,512); Arlington, TX
November 16, 2023*; 8:00 p.m., MW Network		at New Mexico	L 80–82	2–1	29 – Wilson	14 – Gordon	5 – Gordon	The Pit (10,484); Albuquerque, NM
November 19, 2023*; 5:00 p.m., P12N		at No. 3 Arizona; Acrisure Classic on-campus game	L 56–101	2–2	19 – Wilson	5 – Koroma	4 – Gordon	McKale Center (13,403); Tucson, AZ
November 22, 2023*; 7:00 p.m., ESPN+		Alcorn State; Acrisure Classic on-campus game	W 82–69	3–2	20 – Douglas	12 – Wilson	8 – Vining	College Park Center (1,119); Arlington, TX
November 25, 2023*; 2:00 p.m.		Texas State	L 66–73	3–3	21 – Wilson	13 – Wilson	6 – Williams	College Park Center (1,280); Arlington, TX
November 29, 2023; 7:00 p.m.		Abilene Christian	W 86–71	4–3 (1–0)	16 – Gordon	11 – Wilson	8 – Williams	College Park Center (1,275); Arlington, TX
December 2, 2023; 7:00 p.m., ESPN+		at Grand Canyon	L 69–76	4–4 (1–1)	15 – Basili	8 – Koroma	3 – Gordon	Global Credit Union Arena (7,214); Phoenix, AZ
December 6, 2023*; 4:00 p.m., ESPN+		UNT Dallas	W 74–37	5–4	17 – Cash	17 – Cash	6 – Basili	College Park Center (1,696); Arlington, TX
December 16, 2023*; 4:00 p.m., ESPN+		vs. Air Force; Coast-to-Coast Challenge	W 76–73	6–4	28 – Russell	15 – Gordon	4 – Gordon	Dickies Arena (3,752); Fort Worth, TX
December 21, 2023*; 1:00 p.m., ESPN+		at Texas Tech	L 66–77	6–5	18 – Russell	11 – Wilson	7 – Russell	United Supermarkets Arena (8,940); Lubbock, TX
December 23, 2023*; 1:00 p.m., ESPN+		at North Texas	L 52–78	6–6	20 – Wilson	7 – Gordon	4 – Russell	The Super Pit (3,357); Denton, TX
January 1, 2024*; 6:30 p.m., LHN		at No. 20 Texas	L 62–79	6–7	17 – Douglas	8 – Williams	6 – Russell	Moody Center (10,713); Austin, TX
January 4, 2024; 7:00 p.m., ESPN+		at Tarleton State	L 76–78	6–8 (1–2)	24 – Williams	6 – Williams	4 – Vining	Wisdom Gymnasium (1,078); Stephenville, TX
January 6, 2024; 2:00 p.m., ESPN+		at Stephen F. Austin	L 73–92	6–9 (1–3)	16 – Vining	6 – Wilson	5 – 2 tied	William R. Johnson Coliseum (2,049); Nacogdoches, TX
January 11, 2024; 7:00 p.m., ESPN+		Utah Valley	W 83–69	7–9 (2–3)	22 – Gordon	12 – Wilson	8 – Williams	College Park Center (1,112); Arlington, TX
January 13, 2024; 2:00 p.m., ESPN+		Seattle	W 80–75	8–9 (3–3)	17 – Cash	8 – Gordon	8 – Vining	College Park Center (1,009); Arlington, TX
January 18, 2024; 7:00 p.m., ESPN+		UT Rio Grande Valley	W 91–73	9–9 (4–3)	24 – Russell	10 – Wilson	6 – Russell	College Park Center (1,824); Arlington, TX
January 20, 2024; 3:00 p.m., ESPN+		at Abilene Christian	L 67–78	9–10 (4–4)	17 – Williams	12 – Wilson	3 – Gordon	Moody Coliseum (1,541); Abilene, TX
January 27, 2024; 2:00 p.m., ESPN+		Grand Canyon	L 61–67	9–11 (4–5)	13 – tied	10 – Gordon	3 – tied	College Park Center (2,871); Arlington, TX
February 1, 2024; 7:30 p.m., ESPN+		at Southern Utah	W 76–68	10–11 (5–5)	22 – Russell	10 – Gordon	4 – Russell	America First Event Center (1,422); Cedar City, UT
February 3, 2024; 4:00 p.m., ESPN+		at Utah Tech	W 87–66	11–11 (6–5)	16 – Wilson	17 – Gordon	6 – Gordon	Burns Arena (1,904); St. George, UT
February 8, 2024; 9:00 p.m., ESPN+		at California Baptist	L 63–64	11–12 (6–6)	15 – Williams	15 – Wilson	4 – Vining	Fowler Events Center (2,550); Riverside, CA
February 10, 2024; 2:00 p.m., ESPN+		Stephen F. Austin	W 71–63 ^{OT}	12–12 (7–6)	17 – Williams	11 – Wilson	3 – tied	College Park Center (2,393); Arlington, TX
February 15, 2024; 7:00 p.m., ESPN+		Tarleton State	L 78–80	12–13 (7–7)	20 – Gordon	13 – Gordon	3 – tied	College Park Center (2,110); Arlington, TX
February 17, 2024; 6:30 p.m., ESPN+		at UT Rio Grande Valley	W 89–70	13–13 (8–7)	17 – Cash	7 – Wilson	7 – Russell	UTRGV Fieldhouse (2,766); Edinburg, TX
February 22, 2024; 7:00 p.m., ESPN+		Southern Utah	W 90–85	14–13 (9–7)	23 – Gordon	10 – Wilson	8 – Russell	College Park Center (1,622); Arlington, TX
February 24, 2024; 2:00 p.m., ESPN+		Utah Tech	W 89–78	15–13 (10–7)	23 – Williams	10 – Gordon	5 – Williams	College Park Center (1,781); Arlington, TX
February 29, 2024; 9:00 p.m., ESPN+		at Seattle	W 82–62	16–13 (11–7)	19 – Wilson	12 – Cash	5 – tied	Redhawk Center (999); Seattle, WA
March 2, 2024; 3:00 p.m., ESPN+		at Utah Valley	W 78–65	17–13 (12–7)	20 – Russell	13 – Gordon	5 – Wilson	UCCU Center (2,615); Orem, UT
March 7, 2024; 7:00 p.m., ESPN+		California Baptist	W 71–57	18–13 (13–7)	13 – Williams	8 – Cash	7 – Russell	College Park Center (1,871); Arlington, TX
WAC tournament
March 14, 2024; 10:30 p.m., ESPN+	(3)	vs. (6) Stephen F. Austin; Quarterfinals	W 109–78	19–13	30 – Russell	7 – Cash	6 – tied	Orleans Arena (1,021); Paradise, NV
March 15, 2024; 10:30 p.m., ESPNU	(3)	vs. (2) Tarleton; Semifinals	W 87–84	20–13	29 – Wilson	11 – Gordon	10 – Russell	Orleans Arena (4,057); Paradise, NV
March 16, 2024; 10:30 p.m., ESPN2	(3)	vs. (1) Grand Canyon; Championship	L 74–89	20–14	22 – Russell	7 – Gordon	4 – tied	Orleans Arena; Paradise, NV
*Non-conference game. ^{#}Rankings from AP poll. (#) Tournament seedings in parentheses. All times are in Central.
