= 2023–24 Western Athletic Conference men's basketball season =

2023–24 WAC men's basketball season
- League: NCAA Division I
- Sport: Basketball
- Teams: 11
- TV partner(s): ESPN, ESPN+

Regular season

WAC tournament

WAC men's basketball seasons
- ← 2022–23 2024–25 →

2023–24 WAC men's basketball standings
	Conf.				Overall
Team	W		L	PCT	W		L	PCT
Grand Canyon †	17	–	3	.850	30	–	5	.857
Tarleton *	16	–	4	.800	25	–	10	.714
UT Arlington	13	–	7	.650	20	–	14	.588
Seattle	11	–	9	.550	23	–	14	.622
Utah Valley	11	–	9	.550	16	–	16	.500
Stephen F. Austin	10	–	10	.500	18	–	15	.545
Abilene Christian	10	–	10	.500	16	–	18	.471
California Baptist	8	–	12	.400	16	–	17	.485
Utah Tech *	7	–	13	.350	11	–	20	.355
Southern Utah	5	–	15	.250	10	–	21	.323
UT Rio Grande Valley	2	–	18	.100	6	–	25	.194
† 2024 WAC tournament winner * Ineligible for the NCAA tournament due to transition from Division II

The 2023–24 WAC men's basketball season began with practices in October followed by the start of the 2023–24 NCAA Division I men's basketball season in early November 2023. The conference began play in late November 2023. This is the WAC's 62nd season of basketball. The WAC competed with 11 teams due to two teams having left the conference since the prior season. Both New Mexico State and Sam Houston joined Conference USA effective July 1, 2023. The WAC tournament was held March 13–16, 2024 with the top eight teams competing for the automatic bid to the 2024 NCAA Division I men's basketball tournament at Orleans Arena in the Las Vegas-area community of Paradise, Nevada.

This was the last WAC season for UTRGV, which announced on March 25, 2024 that it would join the Southland Conference that July.

== Pre-season ==
=== WAC Media days ===
The WAC's 2023 men's basketball media day was held on October 16.

Men's Basketball Coaches Preseason Poll
Place	Team	Points	First place votes
1.	Grand Canyon	99	9
2.	Stephen F. Austin	87	2
3	Seattle U	86	--
4.	Utah Valley	61	--
5.	Abilene Christian	60	--
6.	Tarleton	49	--
7.	California Baptist	47	--
8.	UT Arlington	43	--
9. (T)	Southern Utah	26	--
9. (T)	UTRGV	26	--
11.	Utah Tech	21	--

=== WAC Preseason All-Conference ===
First Team

Name	School	Yr.	Pos.
Ray Harrison†	Grand Canyon	Junior	G
Gabe McGlothan	Grand Canyon	Senior	F
Cameron Tyson	Seattle U	Senior	G
Sadaidriene Hall	Stephen F. Austin	Junior	F
Drake Allen	Utah Valley	Junior	G

† Denotes Preseason Player of the Year

== Regular season ==
=== Early season tournaments ===
Team	Tournament	Finish
Abilene Christian	Paradise Jam	2nd
California Baptist	The Joust	1st
Grand Canyon	Arizona Tip-Off	2nd
Seattle U	Seattle MTE	1st
Southern Utah	Louisiana Tech MTE	3rd
Stephen F. Austin	Cayman Islands Classic	2nd
Tarleton	SoCal Challenge	1st
UT Arlington	Acrisure Classic	3rd
UTRGV	Acrisure Invitational	4th
Utah Tech	Lake Erie Classic	2nd
Utah Valley	Jacksonville Classic (Bay Bracket)	2nd

=== Conference USA-Western Athletic Conference Challenge ===
Date	Conference USA team	WAC team	Score	Location	Leader
November 9	FIU	Tarleton	82–65	Ocean Bank Convocation Center • Miami, FL	WAC (1–0)
November 9	Sam Houston	Utah Valley	79–73^{OT}	Bernard Johnson Coliseum • Huntsville, TX	WAC (2–0)
November 9	Middle Tennessee	Stephen F. Austin	67–62	Murphy Center • Murfreesboro, TN	WAC (2–1)
November 11	Jacksonville State	Utah Tech	81–79	Pete Mathews Coliseum • Jacksonville, AL	WAC (3–1)
November 21	Louisiana Tech	Southern Utah	67–53	Thomas Assembly Center • Ruston, LA	WAC (3–2)
December 9	Liberty	Grand Canyon	69–64	Liberty Arena • Lynchburg, VA	WAC (4–2)
December 17	UTEP	Abilene Christian	88–82	Moody Coliseum • Abilene, TX	WAC (5–2)
December 18	Jacksonville State	Tarleton	65–62	Wisdom Gym • Stephenville, TX	WAC (5–3)
December 19	New Mexico State	Stephen F. Austin	75–72	William R. Johnson Coliseum • Nacogdoches, TX	WAC (6–3)
December 19	Western Kentucky	California Baptist	73–70	Fowler Events Center • Riverside, CA	WAC (6–4)
December 20	Sam Houston	Grand Canyon	76–64	GCU Arena • Phoenix, AZ	WAC (7–4)
December 20	Louisiana Tech	Seattle	79–73^{OT}	Redhawk Center • Seattle, WA	WAC (8–4)
December 20	Liberty	Utah Valley	63–79	UCCU Center • Orem, UT	WAC (8–5)
December 22	Middle Tennessee	Southern Utah	69–63	America First Event Center • Cedar City, UT	WAC (9–5)
December 30	UTEP	Seattle	73–61	Don Haskins Center • El Paso, TX	WAC (10–5)
December 30	Western Kentucky	Abilene Christian	86–84	E. A. Diddle Arena • Bowling Green, KY	WAC (10–6)
December 30	New Mexico State	California Baptist	66–61	Pan American Center • Las Cruces, NM	WAC (10–7)
December 30	FIU	Utah Tech	96–92^{OT}	Burns Arena • St. George, UT	WAC (11–7)
WINNERS ARE IN BOLD. HOME TEAM IN ITALICS. Rankings from AP Poll released prior to the game. Did not participate: UT Arlington, UT Rio Grande Valley

=== Records against other conferences ===
2023–24 records against non-conference foes:

Regular season

Power Conferences & Gonzaga	Record
ACC	0–2
Big East	0–0
Big Ten	0–0
Big 12	1–4
Pac-12	0–8
SEC	0–3
Gonzaga	0–0
Power Conference Total	1–17
Other NCAA Division I Conferences	Record
America East	0–0
American	0–2
A-10	1–1
ASUN	1–0
Big Sky	5–6
Big South	0–0
Big West	4–3
CAA	0–0
C-USA	12–7
Horizon	0–1
Ivy League	0–1
MAAC	0–0
MAC	0–0
MEAC	0–0
MVC	1–2
Mountain West	3–5
NEC	0–0
OVC	2–1
Patriot League	0–0
SoCon	0–0
Southland	4–1
SWAC	3–1
The Summit	3–2
Sun Belt	2–2
WCC (except Gonzaga)	4–2
Other Division I Total	46–38
Non-Division I Total	19–0
NCAA Division I Total	47–55

=== Record against ranked non-conference opponents ===
This is a list of games against ranked opponents only (rankings from the AP poll/Coaches poll):

Date	Visitor	Home	Score
11/19	UT Arlington	#3/3 Arizona	L, 56–101
12/5	Grand Canyon	#RV/25 San Diego State	W, 79–73
12/21	Tarleton	#8/7 Tennessee	L, 46–65
1/1	UT Arlington	#24/21 Texas	L, 62–79

Team rankings are reflective of AP poll/Coaches poll when the game was played, not current or final ranking.

=== Rankings ===
	Improvement in ranking
	Drop in ranking
RV	Received votes but were not ranked in Top 25
NV	No votes received

		Pre	Wk 2	Wk 3	Wk 4	Wk 5	Wk 6	Wk 7	Wk 8	Wk 9	Wk 10	Wk 11	Wk 12	Wk 13	Wk 14	Wk 15	Wk 16	Wk 17	Wk 18	Final
Abilene Christian	AP	NV	NV	NV	NV	NV	NV	NV	NV	NV	NV	NV	NV	NV	NV	NV	NV	NV	NV	NV
Abilene Christian	C	NV	NV	NV	NV	NV	NV	NV	NV	NV	NV	NV	NV	NV	NV	NV	NV	NV	NV	NV
California Baptist	AP	NV	NV	NV	NV	NV	NV	NV	NV	NV	NV	NV	NV	NV	NV	NV	NV	NV	NV	NV
California Baptist	C	NV	NV	NV	NV	NV	NV	NV	NV	NV	NV	NV	NV	NV	NV	NV	NV	NV	NV	NV
Grand Canyon	AP	NV	NV	NV	NV	NV	RV	RV	RV	RV	RV	RV	RV	NV	RV	RV	RV	NV	NV	NV
Grand Canyon	C	NV	NV	NV	NV	NV	RV	RV	RV	RV	RV	RV	RV	RV	RV	RV	RV	NV	NV	RV
Seattle U	AP	NV	NV	NV	NV	NV	NV	NV	NV	NV	NV	NV	NV	NV	NV	NV	NV	NV	NV	NV
Seattle U	C	NV	NV	NV	NV	NV	NV	NV	NV	NV	NV	NV	NV	NV	NV	NV	NV	NV	NV	NV
Southern Utah	AP	NV	NV	NV	NV	NV	NV	NV	NV	NV	NV	NV	NV	NV	NV	NV	NV	NV	NV	NV
Southern Utah	C	NV	NV	NV	NV	NV	NV	NV	NV	NV	NV	NV	NV	NV	NV	NV	NV	NV	NV	NV
Stephen F. Austin	AP	NV	NV	NV	NV	NV	NV	NV	NV	NV	NV	NV	NV	NV	NV	NV	NV	NV	NV	NV
Stephen F. Austin	C	NV	NV	NV	NV	NV	NV	NV	NV	NV	NV	NV	NV	NV	NV	NV	NV	NV	NV	NV
Tarleton	AP	NV	NV	NV	NV	NV	NV	NV	NV	NV	NV	NV	NV	NV	NV	NV	NV	NV	NV	NV
Tarleton	C	NV	NV	NV	NV	NV	NV	NV	NV	NV	NV	NV	NV	NV	NV	NV	NV	NV	NV	NV
UT Arlington	AP	NV	NV	NV	NV	NV	NV	NV	NV	NV	NV	NV	NV	NV	NV	NV	NV	NV	NV	NV
UT Arlington	C	NV	NV	NV	NV	NV	NV	NV	NV	NV	NV	NV	NV	NV	NV	NV	NV	NV	NV	NV
UTRGV	AP	NV	NV	NV	NV	NV	NV	NV	NV	NV	NV	NV	NV	NV	NV	NV	NV	NV	NV	NV
UTRGV	C	NV	NV	NV	NV	NV	NV	NV	NV	NV	NV	NV	NV	NV	NV	NV	NV	NV	NV	NV
Utah Tech	AP	NV	NV	NV	NV	NV	NV	NV	NV	NV	NV	NV	NV	NV	NV	NV	NV	NV	NV	NV
Utah Tech	C	NV	NV	NV	NV	NV	NV	NV	NV	NV	NV	NV	NV	NV	NV	NV	NV	NV	NV	NV
Utah Valley	AP	NV	NV	NV	NV	NV	NV	NV	NV	NV	NV	NV	NV	NV	NV	NV	NV	NV	NV	NV
Utah Valley	C	NV	NV	NV	NV	NV	NV	NV	NV	NV	NV	NV	NV	NV	NV	NV	NV	NV	NV	NV

== Head coaches ==
=== Coaching changes ===
Three coaching changes were made during the offseason. Todd Simon accepted the head coaching position at Bowling Green in March 2023. The next month, Rob Jeter began as head coach at Southern Utah. With 20 years of coaching experience at the college level, KT Turner was hired as the new head coach at UT Arlington. Mark Madsen was hired as the head coach at California and Todd Phillips was promoted from associate head coach to the head coach at Utah Valley in April 2023.

=== Coaches ===
Note: Stats shown are before the beginning of the season. Overall and WAC records are from time at current school.

Team	Head coach	Previous job	Seasons at school	Overall record	WAC record	WAC titles	NCAA tournaments	NCAA Final Fours	NCAA Championships
Abilene Christian	Brette Tanner	(Associate HC)	3rd	38–28 (.576)	18–18 (.500)	0	0	0	0
California Baptist	Rick Croy	St. Mary's (assistant)	11th	85-66 (.563)	38-42 (.475)	0	0	0	0
Grand Canyon	Bryce Drew	Vanderbilt	4th	64-27 (.703)	33-15 (.688)	1	2	0	0
Seattle U	Chris Victor	(Assistant/interim HC)	3rd	43-21 (.672)	25-11 (.694)	1	0	0	0
Southern Utah	Rob Jeter	Western Illinois	1st	0-0 (–)	0-0 (–)	0	0	0	0
Stephen F. Austin	Kyle Keller	Texas A&M (assistant)	8th	145-68 (.696)	25–11 (.694)	1	0	0	0
Tarleton	Billy Gillispie	Ranger College	4th	30-33 (.476)	23-25 (.479)	0	0	0	0
UT Arlington	K. T. Turner	Kentucky (assistant)	1st	0-0 (–)	0-0 (–)	0	0	0	0
UTRGV	Matt Figger	Austin Peay	3rd	23-40 (.258)	9-27 (.250)	0	0	0	0
Utah Tech	Jon Judkins	Snow College	19th	320-168 (.656)	15-35 (.300)	0	0	0	0
Utah Valley	Todd Phillips	(Associate HC)	1st	0-0 (–)	0-0 (–)	0	0	0	0

Notes:

- Overall and WAC records, conference titles, etc. are from time at current school and are through the end of the 2022–23 season.
- Records and season totals only include time spent at Division I as head coach.
- NCAA tournament appearances are from time at current school only.
- NCAA Final Fours and Championship include time at other schools.

== Postseason ==
=== WAC tournament ===
The conference tournament is scheduled to be played from March 13–16, 2024, at the Orleans Arena in Paradise, Nevada near Las Vegas. Eight of the eleven members are invited to the tournament. While Tarleton and Utah Tech are ineligible for the NCAA tournament, they are eligible for the WAC tournament.

=== NCAA tournament ===
Teams from the conference that were selected to participate: 1

Seed	Region	School	First Four	First round	Second round	Sweet Sixteen	Elite Eight	Final Four	Championship
12	West	Grand Canyon	–	defeated (5) Saint Mary's 75–66	lost to (2) Alabama 61–72	–	–	–	–
	Bids	W-L (%):	0–0 (–)	1–0 (1.000)	0–1 (.000)	0–0 (–)	0–0 (–)	0–0 (–)	TOTAL: 1–1 (.500)

=== National Invitation Tournament ===
Number from the conference that were selected to participate: 0

Seed	School	First round	Second round	Quarterfinals	Semifinals	Finals
		–	–	–	–	–
	W-L (%):	0–0 (–)	0–0 (–)	0–0 (–)	0–0 (–)	TOTAL: 0–0 (–)

=== College Basketball Invitational ===
Number from the conference that were selected to participate: 1

Seed	School	First round	Quarterfinals	Semifinals	Finals
3	Seattle	defeated (14) Delaware State 79–66	defeated (11) Evansville 71–57	defeated (7) Fairfield 75–58	defeated (1) High Point 77–67
	W-L (%):	1–0 (1.000)	1–0 (1.000)	1–0 (1.000)	TOTAL: 4–0 (1.000)

=== CollegeInsider.com Postseason Tournament ===
Number from the conference that were selected to participate: 2

Seed	School	First round	Quarterfinals	Semifinals	Finals
N/A	Abilene Christian	defeated Texas A&M–CC 73–63	lost to Tarleton 59–86	–	–
N/A	Tarleton	defeated Texas Southern 82–71	defeated Abilene Christian 86–59	lost to Purdue Fort Wayne 72–73	–
	W-L (%):	2–0 (1.000)	1–1 (.500)	0–1 (.000)	TOTAL: 3–2 (.600)

Index to colors and formatting
WAC member won
WAC member lost

*Denotes overtime period

== Awards and honors ==
=== Players of the week ===
Throughout the conference regular season, the WAC offices name a player of the week and a newcomer of the week each Monday.

Week	Player of the Week	School	Newcomer of the Week	School
November 13	DaJuan Gordon	UT Arlington	Dominique Daniels Jr.	CBU
November 20	Shemar Wilson	UT Arlington	Tyon Grant-Foster	Grand Canyon
November 27	Jakorie Smith	Tarleton	Tyon Grant-Foster	Grand Canyon
December 4	Tyon Grant-Foster	Grand Canyon	Tyon Grant-Foster	Grand Canyon
December 11	Gabe McGlothan	Grand Canyon	Caleb Stone-Carrawell	Utah Valley
December 18	Gabe McGlothan	Grand Canyon	Phillip Russell	UT Arlington
December 26	Cameron Tyson	Seattle U	Duke Brennan	Grand Canyon
January 2	KiAndre Gaddy	Tarleton	Elijah Elliott	UTRGV
January 8	Gabe McGlothan	Grand Canyon	Tyon Grant-Foster	Grand Canyon
January 15	Tyon Grant-Foster	Grand Canyon	Tyon Grant-Foster	Grand Canyon
January 22	Dominique Daniels Jr.	CBU	Dominique Daniels Jr.	CBU
January 29	Dominique Ford	Southern Utah	Dominique Daniels Jr.	CBU
February 5	Lue Williams, Sr.	Tarleton	Phillip Russell	UT Arlington
February 12	Jaylen Searles	Utah Tech	Jaylen Searles	Utah Tech
February 19	DaJuan Gordon	UT Arlington	John Christofilis	Seattle U
February 26	DaJuan Gordon	UT Arlington	Devon Barnes	Tarleton
March 4	Tyon Grant-Foster	Grand Canyon	Tyon Grant-Foster	Grand Canyon

==== Totals per school - Players of the week ====
School	Player of the week	Freshman of the week	Total
Abilene Christian University			
California Baptist University	1	3	4
Grand Canyon University	6	7	13
Seattle University	1	1	2
Southern Utah University	1		1
Stephen F. Austin State University			
Tarleton State University	3	1	4
University of Texas at Arlington	4	2	6
University of Texas Rio Grande Valley		1	1
Utah Tech University	1	1	2
Utah Valley University		1	1
Total	17	17	34

=== All-WAC ===
First team

Name	School
Tyon Grant-Foster‡	Grand Canyon
Gabe McGlothan	Grand Canyon
Cameron Tyson	Seattle
Jakorie Smith	Tarleton
DaJuan Gordon	UT Arlington

- ‡ WAC Player of the Year
- ‡‡ WAC Defensive Player of the Year

Second team

Name	School
Ali Abdou Dibba	Abilene Christian
Dominique Daniels Jr.	California Baptist
Ray Harrison	Grand Canyon
Alex Schumacher	Seattle
Shemar Wilson	UT Arlington

==== All-Freshman team ====
Name	School
Braden Housley	Southern Utah
Emmanuel Innocenti	Tarleton
Makaih Williams†	UT Arlington
Aric Demings	Utah Tech
Osiris Grady	Utah Valley

† Freshman of the Year

==== All-Defensive team ====
Name	School
Collin Moore	Grand Canyon
KiAndre Gaddy‡	Tarleton
Emmanuel Innocenti	Tarleton
DaJuan Gordon	UT Arlington
Shemar Wilson	UT Arlington

- ‡WAC Defensive Player of the Year

==== Other awards ====
Sixth Man of the Year: Phillip Russell, UT Arlington

Coach of the Year: Joseph Jones, Tarleton

== 2024 NBA draft ==
Round	Pick	Player	Position	Nationality	Team	School/club team
−	−				−	

== Home game attendance ==
Team	Stadium	Capacity	Game 1	Game 2	Game 3	Game 4	Game 5	Game 6	Game 7	Game 8	Game 9	Game 10	Game 11	Game 12	Game 13	Game 14	Game 15	Game 16	Game 17	Game 18	Total	Average	% of Capacity
Abilene Christian	Moody Coliseum	3,600	1,895†	1,773	1,153	1,251	1,469	1,521	1,541	1,401	1,712	1,652	1,323	1,669	1,437	1,817					21,614	1,544	43%
California Baptist	CBU Events Center	5,050	3,290	**5,096**	2,540	2,034	2,009	2,372	2,854	2,522	2,518	3,676	N/A	3,197	4,822	2,550	2,230	2,111	2,550	**5,363†**	51,734	3,043	60%
Grand Canyon	GCU Arena	7,000	**7,186**	**7,118**	**7,208**	**7,214**	**7,282**	N/A	**7,436†**	**7,105**	**7,233**	**7,239**	**7,276**	**7,124**	**7,117**	**7,268**	**7,192**	**7,388**			115,572	**7,223**	103%
Seattle U	Redhawk Center/Climate Pledge Arena	999/18,100	**999**	**999**	1,410‡	**999**	836	943	705	5,702‡†	702	944	795	**1,000**	**999**	2,354‡	966	932	926	**999**	23,210	1,289	129%
Southern Utah	America First Event Center	5,300	1,461	1,181	1,326	1,335	886	1,007	1,809	3,563†	1,422	1,352	1,175	1,613	828	1,119					20,077	1,434	27%
Stephen F. Austin	William R. Johnson Coliseum	7,203	3,250	2,032	2,328	1,710	1,422	2,120	2,049	2,361	3,649†	2,909	2,208	2,120	2,887	1,507	1,565				34,117	2,274	32%
Tarleton State	Wisdom Gymnasium	3,000	1,040	1,327	1,210	605	1,754	1,078	2,104	1,677	2,110	2,140	**3,000†**	2,276	2,024	N/A					22,345	1,719	57%
UT Arlington	College Park Center	7,000	2,185	2,512	1,119	1,280	1,275	1,696	1,112	1,009	1,824	2,871†	2,393	2,110	1,622	1,781	1,871				26,660	1,777	25%
UTRGV	UTRGV Fieldhouse/Bert Ogden Arena	2,500/7,688	1,622	644	1,944	1,012	718	1,031	591	1,015	1,514	1,932	2,041	2,766†	857	652					18,339	1,310	52%
Utah Tech	Burns Arena	4,779	2,501	1,501	1,176	1,213	1,492	1,658	1,455	1,904	2,648†	1,682	1,739	1,440	2,387						22,796	1,754	37%
Utah Valley	UCCU Center	8,500	1,849	1,326	2,319	1,651	1,407	1,553	2,163	2,801†	2,381	1,985	2,474	2,601	2,357	2,615					29,482	2,106	25%
Total		73,523																			385,946	25,474	54%

Bold – At or exceed capacity; capacity ratios for Seattle U and UTRGV computed based on smaller home arena; attendance is for regular season only

- †Season high
- ‡Climate Pledge Arena
- ‡‡Bert Ogden Arena
