= 2023–24 Stephen F. Austin Lumberjacks basketball team =

Basketball team season

2023–24 Stephen F. Austin Lumberjacks basketball
- Conference: Western Athletic Conference
- Record: 18–15 (10–10 WAC)
- Head coach: Kyle Keller (8th season)
- Associate head coach: Tony Jasick
- Assistant coaches: Jean Prioleau; Dallas Cameron
- Home arena: William R. Johnson Coliseum (Capacity: 7,203)

2023–24 WAC men's basketball standings
	Conf.				Overall
Team	W		L	PCT	W		L	PCT
Grand Canyon †	17	–	3	.850	30	–	5	.857
Tarleton *	16	–	4	.800	25	–	10	.714
UT Arlington	13	–	7	.650	20	–	14	.588
Seattle	11	–	9	.550	23	–	14	.622
Utah Valley	11	–	9	.550	16	–	16	.500
Stephen F. Austin	10	–	10	.500	18	–	15	.545
Abilene Christian	10	–	10	.500	16	–	18	.471
California Baptist	8	–	12	.400	16	–	17	.485
Utah Tech *	7	–	13	.350	11	–	20	.355
Southern Utah	5	–	15	.250	10	–	21	.323
UT Rio Grande Valley	2	–	18	.100	6	–	25	.194
† 2024 WAC tournament winner * Ineligible for the NCAA tournament due to transition from Division II

The 2023–24 Stephen F. Austin Lumberjacks basketball team represented Stephen F. Austin State University during the 2023–24 NCAA Division I men's basketball season. The Lumberjacks, led by eighth-year head coach Kyle Keller, played their home games at the William R. Johnson Coliseum in Nacogdoches, Texas as members of the Western Athletic Conference. They finished the season 18–15, 10–10 in WAC play to finish in a tie for sixth place. As the No. 6 seed in the WAC Tournament, they defeated Abilene Christian in the first round, before losing to UT Arlington in the quarterfinals.

== Previous season ==
The Lumberjacks finished the 2022–23 season 19–13, 11–7 in WAC play to finish in a three-way tie for fourth place. In the first round of the WAC Tournament, they were upset by Utah Tech in overtime.

== Roster ==
2023–24 Stephen F. Austin Lumberjacks men's basketball team
Players
Coaches

Pos.	#	Name	Height	Weight	Year	Hometown
G	0	Myles Jenkins	6 ft 4 in (1.93 m)	220 lb (100 kg)	Jr	Lexington, South Carolina
G	1	Kyle Hayman	6 ft 5 in (1.96 m)	200 lb (91 kg)	Jr	Delhi, Louisiana
G	2	DaeVeon Scott	6 ft 3 in (1.91 m)	165 lb (75 kg)	RS Fr	Fort Worth, Texas
G	3	Ethan Mayes	6 ft 0 in (1.83 m)	180 lb (82 kg)	Jr	Houston, Texas
G	4	Kimahri Wilson	6 ft 1 in (1.85 m)	170 lb (77 kg)	RS So	North Chicago, Illinois
F	6	Sadaidriene Hall	6 ft 5 in (1.96 m)	210 lb (95 kg)	Jr	Sulphur Springs, Texas
F/C	7	Jalil Beaubrun	6 ft 9 in (2.06 m)	240 lb (109 kg)	Jr	Miami, Florida
G	8	AJ Cajuste	6 ft 1 in (1.85 m)	185 lb (84 kg)	RS Sr	Boca Raton, Florida
G	10	Latrell Jossell	6 ft 1 in (1.85 m)	185 lb (84 kg)	Jr	Chicago, Illinois
G/F	11	Chrishawn Christmas	6 ft 5 in (1.96 m)	205 lb (93 kg)	So	Gary, Indiana
G	12	Jaxson Sheldon	5 ft 11 in (1.8 m)	180 lb (82 kg)	Fr	Beaumont, Texas
G	14	Luke Stansbury	6 ft 2 in (1.88 m)	185 lb (84 kg)	Fr	Bowling Green, Kentucky
F	22	Nana Antwi-Boasiako	6 ft 9 in (2.06 m)	235 lb (107 kg)	Jr	Nacogdoches, Texas
F	23	Clayton Southwick	6 ft 8 in (2.03 m)	235 lb (107 kg)	Jr	Palmer, Alaska
F	32	Juhlawnei Stone	6 ft 6 in (1.98 m)	235 lb (107 kg)	Jr	Lancaster, California
G	44	Frank Staine	6 ft 8 in (2.03 m)	220 lb (100 kg)	GS	Inglewood, California

Head coach

- Kyle Keller (Louisiana Tech)

Assistant coach(es)

- Tony Jasick (Mars Hill)
- Jean Prioleau (Fordham)
- Dallas Cameron (Stephen F. Austin)

Legend

- (C) Team captain
- (S) Suspended
- (I) Ineligible
- (W) Walk-on
- Injured
- Current redshirt

Roster
Last update: October 21, 2023

== Schedule and results ==
Date time, TV	Rank^{#}	Opponent^{#}	Result	Record	Site (attendance) city, state
Regular season
November 6, 2023*; 11:30 a.m., ESPN+		North American	W 96–68	1–0	William R. Johnson Coliseum (3,250); Nacogdoches, TX
November 9, 2023*; 6:30 p.m.		at Middle Tennessee; WAC/C-USA Challenge	L 62–67	1–1	Murphy Center (3,411); Murfreesboro, TN
November 13, 2023*; 6:30 p.m., ESPN+		at Northwestern State	W 96–70	2–1	Prather Coliseum (1,111); Natchitoches, LA
November 19, 2023*; 12:30 p.m., FloHoops		vs. Loyola Marymount; Cayman Islands Classic First round	W 86–76	3–1	John Gray Gymnasium; George Town, Cayman Islands
November 20, 2023*; 12:30 p.m., FloHoops		vs. Drake; Cayman Islands Classic Semifinals	W 92–68	4–1	John Gray Gymnasium; George Town, Cayman Islands
November 21, 2023*; 6:30 p.m., FloHoops		vs. Utah State; Cayman Islands Classic Championship	L 49–79	4–2	John Gray Gymnasium (1,531); George Town, Cayman Islands
November 29, 2023; 6:30 p.m., ESPN+		Tarleton	L 66–68	4–3 (0–1)	William R. Johnson Coliseum (2,032); Nacogdoches, TX
December 2, 2023; 5:00 p.m., ESPN+		at Abilene Christian	W 79–74 ^{OT}	5–3 (1–1)	Moody Coliseum (1,773); Abilene, TX
December 5, 2023*; 6:30 p.m., ESPN+		Louisiana Tech	L 49–56	5–4	William R. Johnson Coliseum (2,328); Nacogdoches, TX
December 9, 2023*; 3:00 p.m.		at Wyoming	L 70–78	5–5	Arena-Auditorium (3,584); Laramie, WY
December 19, 2023*; 6:30 p.m., ESPN+		New Mexico State; WAC/C-USA Challenge	W 75–72	6–5	William R. Johnson Coliseum (1,710); Nacogdoches, TX
December 22, 2023*; 1:00 p.m., ESPN+		Paul Quinn	W 115–58	7–5	William R. Johnson Coliseum (1,422); Nacogdoches, TX
December 29, 2023*; 6:30 p.m., ESPN+		New Orleans	W 80–51	8–5	William R. Johnson Coliseum (2,120); Nacogdoches, TX
January 4, 2024; 12:00 p.m., ESPN+		at UT Rio Grande Valley	W 85–78	9–5 (2–1)	UTRGV Fieldhouse (1,031); Edinburg, TX
January 6, 2024; 2:00 p.m., ESPN+		UT Arlington	W 92–73	10–5 (3–1)	William R. Johnson Coliseum (2,049); Nacogdoches, TX
January 11, 2024; 8:00 p.m., ESPN+		at Utah Tech	L 70–75	10–6 (3–2)	Burns Arena (1,658); St. George, UT
January 13, 2024; 6:30 p.m., ESPN+		at Southern Utah	W 84–82	11–6 (4–2)	America First Event Center (1,809); Cedar City, UT
January 18, 2024; 6:30 p.m., ESPN+		Seattle	W 89–84 ^{OT}	12–6 (5–2)	William R. Johnson Coliseum (2,361); Nacogdoches, TX
January 25, 2024; 6:30 p.m., ESPN+		Grand Canyon	L 51–53	12–7 (5–3)	William R. Johnson Coliseum (3,649); Nacogdoches, TX
January 27, 2024; 2:00 p.m., ESPN+		California Baptist	L 79–81	12–8 (5–4)	William R. Johnson Coliseum (2,909); Nacogdoches, TX
February 1, 2024; 6:30 p.m., ESPN+		Utah Valley	W 77–72	13–8 (6–4)	William R. Johnson Coliseum (2,208); Nacogdoches, TX
February 3, 2024; 4:00 p.m., ESPN+		at Tarleton	L 64–75	13–9 (6–5)	Wisdom Gym (2,140); Stephenville, TX
February 8, 2024; 6:30 p.m., ESPN+		UT Rio Grande Valley	W 92–84	14–9 (7–5)	William R. Johnson Coliseum (2,120); Nacogdoches, TX
February 10, 2024; 2:00 p.m., ESPN+		at UT Arlington	L 63–71 ^{OT}	14–10 (7–6)	College Park Center (2,393); Arlington, TX
February 17, 2024; 2:00 p.m., ESPN+		Abilene Christian	L 62–63	14–11 (7–7)	William R. Johnson Coliseum (2,887); Nacogdoches, TX
February 22, 2024; 9:00 p.m., ESPN+		at Seattle	L 49–69	14–12 (7–8)	Redhawk Center (932); Seattle, WA
February 24, 2024; 3:00 p.m., ESPN+		at Utah Valley	L 62–71	14–13 (7–9)	UCCU Center (2,357); Orem, UT
February 29, 2024; 9:00 p.m., ESPN+		at California Baptist	W 62–60 ^{OT}	15–13 (8–9)	Fowler Events Center (2,111); Riverside, CA
March 2, 2024; 9:00 p.m., ESPN+		at Grand Canyon	L 58–80	15–14 (8–10)	GCU Arena (7,388); Phoenix, AZ
March 7, 2024; 6:30 p.m., ESPN+		Southern Utah	W 87–60	16–14 (9–10)	William R. Johnson Coliseum (1,507); Nacogdoches, TX
March 9, 2024; 2:00 p.m., ESPN+		Utah Tech	W 84–71	17–14 (10–10)	William R. Johnson Coliseum; Nacogdoches, TX
WAC tournament
March 13, 2024; 10:30 pm, ESPN+	(6)	vs. (7) Abilene Christian; First round	W 60–57	18–14	Orleans Arena (1,064); Paradise, NV
March 14, 2024; 10:30 pm, ESPN+	(6)	vs. (3) UT Arlington; Quarterfinals	L 78–109	18–15	Orleans Arena (1,021); Paradise, NV
*Non-conference game. ^{#}Rankings from AP Poll. (#) Tournament seedings in parentheses. All times are in Central Time.
