= 2023–24 Tarleton State Texans men's basketball team =

American college basketball season

2023–24 Tarleton State Texans men's basketball

SoCal Challenge Sand Division champions

CIT, semifinals
- Conference: Western Athletic Conference
- Record: 25–10 (16–4 WAC)
- Head coach: Billy Gillispie (4th season)
- Assistant coaches: Joseph Jones (acting head coach as of November 14); Luke Adams; Damon Archibald
- Home arena: Wisdom Gym

2023–24 WAC men's basketball standings
	Conf.				Overall
Team	W		L	PCT	W		L	PCT
Grand Canyon †	17	–	3	.850	30	–	5	.857
Tarleton *	16	–	4	.800	25	–	10	.714
UT Arlington	13	–	7	.650	20	–	14	.588
Seattle	11	–	9	.550	23	–	14	.622
Utah Valley	11	–	9	.550	16	–	16	.500
Stephen F. Austin	10	–	10	.500	18	–	15	.545
Abilene Christian	10	–	10	.500	16	–	18	.471
California Baptist	8	–	12	.400	16	–	17	.485
Utah Tech *	7	–	13	.350	11	–	20	.355
Southern Utah	5	–	15	.250	10	–	21	.323
UT Rio Grande Valley	2	–	18	.100	6	–	25	.194
† 2024 WAC tournament winner * Ineligible for the NCAA tournament due to transition from Division II

The 2023–24 Tarleton State Texans men's basketball team represented Tarleton State University in the 2023–24 NCAA Division I men's basketball season. They were led by fourth-year head coach Billy Gillispie and played their games at the Wisdom Gym as members of the Western Athletic Conference (WAC). They finished the season 25–10, 16–4 in WAC play, to finish in second place. As the No. 2 seed in the WAC tournament, they lost to UT Arlington in the semifinals. They received an invitation to the CIT, where they defeated Texas Southern in the first round, and fellow WAC member Abilene Christian in the quarterfinals, before losing to Purdue Fort Wayne in the semifinals.

This season marked Tarleton State's final year of a four-year transition period from Division II to Division I. As a result, the Texans were not eligible to play in the NCAA tournament, but were eligible to play in the WAC tournament.

On November 14, just four games into the season, head coach Billy Gillispie took a medical leave of absence, leaving Joseph Jones as the acting head coach. Gillespie later signed a two-year contract extension on March 5, but announced he would remain in an advisory role for the remainder of the season in order to fully recover.

== Previous season ==
The Texans finished the season 17–17, 9–9 in conference play, to finish in seventh place. In the WAC tournament, the team defeated UT Rio Grande Valley in their first-round game before falling to Utah Valley in the quarterfinals. While not eligible to be invited to the NCAA tournament during their four-year transition from Division II to Division I, the Texans were invited to the College Basketball Invitational. They were defeated by the Radford in the first round to end their season.

== Roster ==
2023–24 Tarleton State Texans men's basketball team
Players
Coaches

Pos.	#	Name	Height	Weight	Year	Previous school	Hometown
G	0	Izzy Miles	6 ft 2 in (1.88 m)	185 lb (84 kg)	Fr	Grissom HS	Huntsville, AL
G	1	Miles Lewis	6 ft 0 in (1.83 m)	160 lb (73 kg)	Jr	Sacramento HS	Sacramento, CA
F	2	Traivar Jackson	6 ft 6 in (1.98 m)	210 lb (95 kg)	Jr	West Anchorage HS	Anchorage, AK
G	3	Quinton II Perkins	6 ft 0 in (1.83 m)	173 lb (78 kg)	Fr	Lake Highlands HS	Rowlett, TX
G	4	Lue Williams	6 ft 5 in (1.96 m)	197 lb (89 kg)	Sr	Coastal Alabama CC–South	Atmore, AL
F	5	KiAndre Gaddy	6 ft 6 in (1.98 m)	215 lb (98 kg)	Sr	Walla Walla	Dallas, TX
F	6	Jakorie Smith	6 ft 6 in (1.98 m)	215 lb (98 kg)	Sr	East Mississippi CC	Utica, MS
G	7	Kaya Mutambirwa	6 ft 4 in (1.93 m)	185 lb (84 kg)	Fr	Real Madrid HS	Geneva, Switzerland
G	8	Joseph Martinez	6 ft 3 in (1.91 m)	175 lb (79 kg)	RS Fr	Canutillo HS	El Paso, TX
F	9	Emmanuel Innocenti	6 ft 5 in (1.96 m)	198 lb (90 kg)	Fr	ITC Piero Calamandrei	Ranzanico, Italy
G	10	Adam Moussa	6 ft 3 in (1.91 m)	195 lb (88 kg)	Sr	Black Hills State	Cairo, Egypt
G	11	Bubu Benjamin	6 ft 7 in (2.01 m)	205 lb (93 kg)	Fr	Edge HS	Medicine Hat, AB
G	12	Nasan Ayala	6 ft 3 in (1.91 m)	188 lb (85 kg)	Jr	Pratt CC	Queens, NY
G	13	Devon Barnes	6 ft 0 in (1.83 m)	171 lb (78 kg)	So	Shiloh HS	Hinesville, GA
C	20	Kevin Jr. Paul	6 ft 9 in (2.06 m)	202 lb (92 kg)	Fr	Open Tent Academy	Grand Prairie, TX
G	22	Jalen Thomas	6 ft 1 in (1.85 m)	185 lb (84 kg)	Sr	Oklahoma Panhandle State	Amarillo, TX
F	23	Dario Domingos	6 ft 7 in (2.01 m)	250 lb (113 kg)	Jr	UT Arlington	Midland, TX
G	26	Jayden Gordon	6 ft 2 in (1.88 m)	159 lb (72 kg)	Fr	Harlan HS	San Antonio, TX
F	40	Blake Brinkmeyer	6 ft 8 in (2.03 m)	225 lb (102 kg)	Sr	Kirkwood CC	West Des Moines, IA
G	76	Zaakir Sawyer	6 ft 5 in (1.96 m)	208 lb (94 kg)	Jr	Trinity Valley CC	Dallas, TX
F	77	Adil Lalji	6 ft 8 in (2.03 m)	190 lb (86 kg)	So	Seattle Pacific	Seattle, WA

Head coach

- Billy Gillispie (Texas State)

Assistant coach(es)

- Joseph Jones (Texas A&M)
- Luke Adams (Texas Tech)
- Damon Archibald (College of Idaho)

Legend

- (C) Team captain
- (S) Suspended
- (I) Ineligible
- (W) Walk-on
- Injured
- Current redshirt

Roster
Last update: October 27, 2023

== Schedule and results ==
Date time, TV	Rank^{#}	Opponent^{#}	Result	Record	High points	High rebounds	High assists	Site (attendance) city, state
Exhibition
October 30, 2023*; 8:00 p.m., ESPN+		Howard Payne	W 105–42		30 – Smith	15 – Gaddy	4 – Miles	Wisdom Gym (720); Stephenville, TX
Regular season
November 6, 2023*; 6:00 p.m.		at Virginia	L 50–80	0–1	11 – Barnes	5 – tied	3 – Benjamin	John Paul Jones Arena (14,080); Charlottesville, VA
November 9, 2023*; 6:00 p.m.		at FIU; C–USA/WAC Alliance	W 82–65	1–1	34 – Smith	14 – Gaddy	5 – tied	Ocean Bank Convocation Center (1,242); Miami, FL
November 11, 2023*; 7:00 p.m., ESPN+		UNT Dallas	W 93–52	2–1	20 – Gaddy	13 – Innocenti	5 – Barnes	Wisdom Gym (1,040); Stephenville, TX
November 14, 2023*; 7:00 p.m., ESPN+		at Bradley; SoCal Challenge campus game	L 63–86	2–2	16 – tied	6 – Williams	1 – tied	Carver Arena (4,032); Peoria, IL
November 20, 2023*; 4:00 p.m., ESPN+		vs. Austin Peay; SoCal Challenge Sand Division semifinal	W 66–59	3–2	28 – Smith	7 – tied	4 – tied	The Pavilion at JSerra (113); San Juan Capistrano, CA
November 22, 2023*; 4:30 p.m., FloHoops		vs. Cal State Bakersfield; SoCal Challenge Sand Division championship	W 59–40	4–2	17 – Smith	13 – Innocenti	5 – Moussa	The Pavilion at JSerra (259); San Juan Capistrano, CA
November 29, 2023; 6:30 p.m., ESPN+		at Stephen F. Austin	W 68–66	5–2 (1–0)	18 – Williams	9 – Williams	3 – Lewis	William R. Johnson Coliseum (2,032); Nacogdoches, TX
December 2, 2023; 4:00 p.m., ESPN+		UT Rio Grande Valley	W 77–75	6–2 (2–0)	18 – Gaddy	10 – Gaddy	5 – Barnes	Wisdom Gym (1,327); Stephenville, TX
December 5, 2023*; 7:00 p.m., ESPN+		Hardin–Simmons	W 92–56	7–2	16 – Williams	6 – Benjamin	3 – Moussa	Wisdom Gym (1,210); Stephenville, TX
December 12, 2023*; 7:00 p.m., ESPN+		Sterling	W 85–47	8–2	17 – Smith	12 – Gaddy	4 – Smith	Wisdom Gym (605); Stephenville, TX
December 18, 2023*; 7:00 p.m., ESPN+		Jacksonville State; C-USA/WAC Alliance	L 62–65	8–3	20 – Barnes	9 – Innocenti	4 – tied	Wisdom Gym (1,754); Stephenville, TX
December 21, 2023*; 5:30 p.m., ESPN+		at No. 8 Tennessee	L 46–65	8–4	12 – Barnes	8 – Smith	5 – Williams	Thompson-Boling Arena (17,609); Knoxville, TN
December 29, 2023*; 9:00 p.m., ESPN+		at Loyola Marymount	W 79–66	9–4	24 – Gaddy	12 – Gaddy	8 – Innocenti	Gersten Pavilion (818); Los Angeles, CA
January 4, 2024; 7:00 p.m., ESPN+		UT Arlington	W 78–76	10–4 (3–0)	19 – Innocenti	8 – Jackson	5 – Barnes	Wisdom Gym (1,078); Stephenville, TX
January 11, 2024; 9:00 p.m., ESPN+		at California Baptist	L 63–77	10–5 (3–1)	12 – Barnes	5 – Innocenti	2 – tied	Fowler Events Center (3,676); Riverside, CA
January 13, 2024; 8:00 p.m., ESPN+		at Grand Canyon	L 48–74	10–6 (3–2)	11 – Barnes	5 – Gaddy	2 – tied	GCU Arena (7,233); Phoenix, AZ
January 18, 2024; 7:00 p.m., ESPN+		Abilene Christian	W 79–71	11–6 (4–2)	25 – Smith	9 – Innocenti	4 – tied	Wisdom Gym (2,104); Stephenville, TX
January 20, 2024; 6:30 p.m., ESPN+		at UT Rio Grande Valley	W 77–73	12–6 (5–2)	28 – Williams	8 – Gaddy	7 – Innocenti	UTRGV Fieldhouse (1,514); Edinburg, TX
January 25, 2024; 7:00 p.m., ESPN+		Southern Utah	L 70–73	12–7 (5–3)	22 – Barnes	9 – Innocenti	5 – Innocenti	Wisdom Gym (1,677); Stephenville, TX
January 27, 2024; 4:00 p.m., ESPN+		Utah Tech	W 86–68	13–7 (6–3)	28 – Smith	7 – Innocenti	7 – Moussa	Wisdom Gym (2,110); Stephenville, TX
February 1, 2024; 6:00 p.m., ESPN+		at Abilene Christian	W 76–73 ^{OT}	14–7 (7–3)	25 – Williams	12 – Gaddy	3 – Smith	Moody Coliseum (1,652); Abilene, TX
February 3, 2024; 4:00 p.m., ESPN+		Stephen F. Austin	W 75–64	15–7 (8–3)	27 – Williams	6 – Gaddy	4 – tied	Wisdom Gym (2,140); Stephenville, TX
February 8, 2024; 7:00 p.m., ESPN+		at Utah Valley	W 72–61	16–7 (9–3)	21 – Williams	10 – Innocenti	4 – tied	UCCU Center (1,985); Orem, UT
February 10, 2024; 5:00 p.m., ESPN+		at Seattle	W 82–77	17–7 (10–3)	26 – Smith	7 – tied	4 – Innocenti	Redhawk Center (966); Seattle, WA
February 15, 2024; 7:00 p.m., ESPN+		at UT Arlington	W 80–78	18–7 (11–3)	22 – Williams	7 – Innocenti	5 – tied	College Park Center (2,110); Arlington, TX
February 22, 2024; 7:00 p.m., ESPN+		Grand Canyon	W 77–74	19–7 (12–3)	24 – Smith	14 – Gaddy	4 – Innocenti	Wisdom Gym (3,000); Stephenville, TX
February 24, 2024; 4:00 p.m., ESPN+		California Baptist	W 82–65	20–7 (13–3)	33 – Barnes	5 – tied	10 – Moussa	Wisdom Gym (2,276); Stephenville, TX
February 29, 2024; 8:00 p.m., ESPN+		at Utah Tech	W 85–74	21–7 (14–3)	24 – Smith	8 – Williams	5 – Smith	Burns Arena (1,440); St. George, UT
March 2, 2024; 6:30 p.m., ESPN+		at Southern Utah	W 88–83	22–7 (15–3)	22 – Smith	8 – Gaddy	6 – Moussa	America First Event Center (1,119); Cedar City, UT
March 7, 2024; 7:00 p.m., ESPN+		Utah Valley	L 60–63	22–8 (15–4)	18 – Barnes	8 – Smith	3 – Jackson	Wisdom Gym (N/A); Stephenville, TX
March 9, 2024; 4:00 p.m., ESPN+		Seattle	W 69–66	23–8 (16–4)	21 – Gaddy	10 – Innocenti	5 – tied	Wisdom Gym (2,024); Stephenville, TX
WAC tournament
March 15, 2024; 10:30 p.m., ESPNU	(2)	vs. (3) UT Arlington; Semifinals	L 84–87	23–9	24 – Barnes	7 – Innocenti	4 – tied	Orleans Arena (4,057); Paradise, NV
CIT
March 19, 2024*; 6:00 pm, ESPN+		Texas Southern; First round – Lou Henson Classic	W 82–71	24–9	21 – Williams	10 – Gaddy	6 – Moussa	Wisdom Gym (1,426); Stephenville, TX
March 20, 2024*; 6:00 pm, ESPN+		Abilene Christian; Quarterfinals – Lou Henson Classic	W 86–59	25–9	16 – Gaddy	8 – Innocenti	6 – Innocenti	Wisdom Gym (1,576); Stephenville, TX
March 25, 2024*; 6:00 pm, ESPN+		Purdue Fort Wayne; Semifinals	L 72–73	25–10	16 – Moussa	7 – Smith	4 – Moussa	Wisdom Gym (1,686); Stephenville, TX
*Non-conference game. ^{#}Rankings from AP poll. (#) Tournament seedings in parentheses. All times are in Central.
