= 2023–24 Sam Houston Bearkats men's basketball team =

American college basketball season

2023–24 Sam Houston Bearkats men's basketball
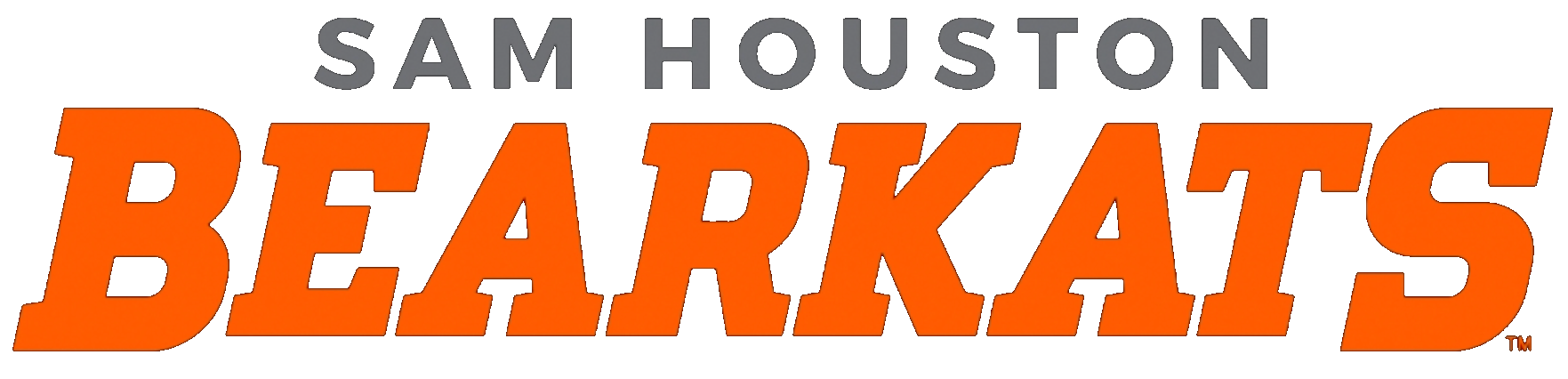

Conference USA regular season champions Trojan Classic champions
- Conference: Conference USA
- Record: 21–12 (13–3 CUSA)
- Head coach: Chris Mudge (1st season)
- Assistant coaches: Justin Bailey (3rd season); Brendan Foley (1st season); Jake White (1st season)
- Home arena: Bernard Johnson Coliseum

2023–24 Conference USA men's basketball standings
	Conf.				Overall
Team	W		L	PCT	W		L	PCT
Sam Houston	13	–	3	.813	21	–	12	.636
Louisiana Tech	12	–	4	.750	22	–	10	.688
Western Kentucky †	8	–	8	.500	22	–	12	.647
Liberty	7	–	9	.438	18	–	14	.563
UTEP	7	–	9	.438	18	–	16	.529
New Mexico State	7	–	9	.438	13	–	19	.406
Middle Tennessee	7	–	9	.438	14	–	19	.424
Jacksonville State	6	–	10	.375	14	–	18	.438
FIU	5	–	11	.313	11	–	22	.333
† 2024 CUSA tournament winner

The 2023–24 Sam Houston Bearkats men's basketball team represented Sam Houston State University in the 2023–24 NCAA Division I men's basketball season. The Bearkats, led by first-year head coach Chris Mudge, played their home games at the Bernard Johnson Coliseum in Huntsville, Texas as first-year members of the Conference USA.

== Previous season ==
The Bearkats finished the 2022–23 season 26–8, 14–4 in WAC play to finish in second place. They defeated California Baptist in the quarterfinals of the WAC tournament before losing to Grand Canyon in the semifinals. They received an at-large bid to the National Invitation Tournament. There they defeated Santa Clara before losing to eventual champion North Texas in the second round.

On March 24, 2023, head coach Jason Hooten left the school to take the head coaching position at New Mexico State. On April 3, the school named assistant coach Chris Mudge the team's new head coach.

== Offseason ==
=== Departures ===
Name	Number	Pos.	Height	Weight	Year	Hometown	Reason for departure
Ronald Mitchell Jr.	0	G	6'3"	180	Junior	Philadelphia, PA	Transferred to Langston
Kaosi Ezeagu	1	F	6'10"	255	Junior	Brampton, ON	Transferred to New Mexico State
Qua Grant	2	G	6'1"	190	Senior	DeSoto, TX	Graduated
Jacoby Bishop	5	G	6'2"	195	Sophomore	New Waverly, TX	Walk-on; not on team roster
Javion May	11	G	6'2"	190	Senior	Chicago, IL	Graduated
Tristan Ikpe	12	F	6'6"	210	Senior	Deer Park, TX	Graduated
Donte Powers	24	G	6'2"	170	Senior	Starkville, MS	Graduated
Giovanni Emejuru	33	F/C	6'10"	270	RS Freshman	Leicester, England	Transferred to Siena

=== Incoming transfers ===
Name	Number	Pos.	Height	Weight	Year	Hometown	Previous school
Owen McGlashan	0	F/G	6'7"	210	GS Senior	Marlton, NJ	Saint Anselm
Davon Barnes	2	F	6'5"	215	Junior	Memphis, TN	Texas Southern
Marcus Boykin	5	G	6'1"	185	Junior	Clinton, NC	Barton College
Kingsley Ijeoma	14	F	6'8"	200	Sophomore	Houston, TX	Kilgore College
Lewis Rowe	21	F/C	6'10"		Junior	Adelaide, Australia	New Mexico JC
Souleymane Doumbia	31	C	6'11"	235	Senior	Abidjan, Ivory Coast	TCU

=== 2023 recruiting class ===
College recruiting information
Name	Hometown	School	Height	Weight	Commit date
C. J. Beaumont; PF	Palm Beach Gardens, FL	Palm Beach Prep	6 ft 8 in (2.03 m)	185 lb (84 kg)	May 16, 2023
C. J. Beaumont; PF	Recruit ratings: Scout: Rivals: 247Sports: (NR)				
Overall recruit ranking:
Note: In many cases, Scout, Rivals, 247Sports, On3, and ESPN may conflict in their listings of height and weight.; In these cases, the average was taken. ESPN grades are on a 100-point scale.; Sources: "2023 Team Ranking". Rivals.

=== 2024 recruiting class ===
College recruiting information (2024)
Name	Hometown	School	Height	Weight	Commit date
Erik Taylor; CG	Orlando, FL	The Rock School	6 ft 1 in (1.85 m)	175 lb (79 kg)	Jul 20, 2023
Erik Taylor; CG	Recruit ratings: Scout: Rivals: 247Sports: (NR)				
Overall recruit ranking:
Note: In many cases, Scout, Rivals, 247Sports, On3, and ESPN may conflict in their listings of height and weight.; In these cases, the average was taken. ESPN grades are on a 100-point scale.; Sources: "2023 Team Ranking". Rivals.

== Roster ==
2023–24 Sam Houston State Bearkats men's basketball team
Players
Coaches

Pos.	#	Name	Height	Weight	Year	Previous school	Hometown
G/F	0	Owen McGlashan	6 ft 7 in (2.01 m)	210 lb (95 kg)	GS	Don Bosco Prep; Saint Anselm	Marlton, NJ
G	1	CJ Beaumont	6 ft 8 in (2.03 m)	210 lb (95 kg)	Fr	Palm Beach Prep	West Palm Beach, FL
G	2	Davon Barnes	6 ft 5 in (1.96 m)	215 lb (98 kg)	Jr	Collierville HS; Texas Southern	Memphis, TN
G	3	Lamar Wilkerson	6 ft 4 in (1.93 m)	205 lb (93 kg)	Jr	Ashdown HS; Three Rivers College	Ashdown, AR
G	4	Anthony Wrzeszcz	6 ft 3 in (1.91 m)	185 lb (84 kg)	So	Wasatch Academy	Gdynia, Poland
G	5	Marcus Boykin	6 ft 1 in (1.85 m)	190 lb (86 kg)	Jr	Trinity Christian School; Barton College	Clinton, NC
G	10	Damon Nicholas Jr.	6 ft 4 in (1.93 m)	195 lb (88 kg)	Jr	Duncanville HS	Ducanville, TX
G	11	Bryce Cook	5 ft 7 in (1.7 m)	160 lb (73 kg)	Fr	Sunrise Christian Academy; SMU	Arlington, TX
G	13	Jaden Ray	5 ft 10 in (1.78 m)	165 lb (75 kg)	Sr	Midwest City HS; Northern Oklahoma College	Midwest City, OK
F	14	Kinglsey Ijeoma	6 ft 8 in (2.03 m)	200 lb (91 kg)	Jr	Southern California Academy; Kilgore College	Houston, TX
F	21	Lewis Rowe	6 ft 10 in (2.08 m)	250 lb (113 kg)	Jr	Prince Alfred College; New Mexico JC	Adelaide, Australia
G	24	Derrick Brown (W)	6 ft 0 in (1.83 m)	175 lb (79 kg)	Jr	St. Pius HS; Navarro College	Houston, TX
F	25	Cameron Huefner	6 ft 7 in (2.01 m)	210 lb (95 kg)	Jr	St. Peter's College; Pittsburg State	Adelaide, Australia
C	31	Souleymane Doumbia	6 ft 11 in (2.11 m)	230 lb (104 kg)	Sr	TCU	Abidjan, Ivory Coast
F	40	Kian Scroggins	6 ft 7 in (2.01 m)	235 lb (107 kg)	Jr	Raymore–Peculiar HS	Raymore, MO

Head coach

- Chris Mudge (Texas)

Assistant coach(es)

- Justin Bailey (UT Permian Basin)
- Brendan Foley (Kansas State)
- Jake White (UT Tyler)

Legend

- (C) Team captain
- (S) Suspended
- (I) Ineligible
- (W) Walk-on
- Injured
- Current redshirt

Roster

== Schedule and results ==
Date time, TV	Rank^{#}	Opponent^{#}	Result	Record	High points	High rebounds	High assists	Site (attendance) city, state
Exhibition
October 29, 2023*; 2:00 p.m.		at North Texas; Charity Exhibition	L 53–56		13 – Ray	11 – Doumbia	1 – Tied	The Super Pit (5,000); Denton, TX
Non-conference regular season
November 6, 2023*; 6:00 p.m., ESPN+		at Pacific	W 64–57	1–0	15 – Wilkerson	7 – Tied	4 – Ray	Alex G. Spanos Center; Stockton, CA
November 9, 2023*; 6:30 p.m., ESPN+		Utah Valley; C-USA/WAC Alliance	L 73–79 ^{OT}	1–1	20 – Wilkerson	8 – Nicholas Jr.	8 – Ray	Bernard Johnson Coliseum (1,187); Huntsville, TX
November 12, 2023*; 2:00 p.m., ESPN+		at Oklahoma State	L 70–85	1–2	16 – Barnes	7 – Tied	3 – Ray	Gallagher-Iba Arena (5,843); Stillwater, OK
November 17, 2023*; 8:00 p.m., ESPN+		at Ole Miss	L 67–70	1–3	22 – Barnes	7 – Tied	5 – Ray	Tad Smith Coliseum (4,445); Oxford, MS
November 20, 2023*; 6:00 p.m., ESPN+		at Troy; Trojan Classic	W 88–86 ^{OT}	2–3	25 – Wilkerson	10 – Nicholas Jr.	8 – Ray	Trojan Arena (2,321); Troy, AL
November 22, 2023*; 1:30 p.m.		vs. Grambling State; Trojan Classic	W 86–68	3–3	21 – Barnes	5 – Tied	7 – Boykin	Trojan Arena (132); Troy, AL
November 25, 2023*; 6:30 p.m., ESPN+		Paul Quinn	W 78–61	4–3	19 – Barnes	9 – McGlashan	6 – Boykin	Bernard Johnson Coliseum (567); Huntsville, TX
November 29, 2023*; 8:00 p.m., P12N		at Arizona State	L 61–78	4–4	15 – Nicholas Jr.	11 – Scroggins	6 – Ray	Desert Financial Arena (6,090); Tempe, AZ
December 3, 2023*; 5:00 p.m., ESPN+		Lamar	W 90–70	5–4	24 – Wilkerson	7 – Barnes	7 – Ray	Bernard Johnson Coliseum (794); Huntsville, TX
December 9, 2023*; 6:00 p.m., ESPN+		at Missouri State	L 60–69	5–5	16 – Barnes	11 – Nicholas Jr.	4 – Nicholas Jr.	Great Southern Bank Arena (3,821); Springfield, MO
December 12, 2023*; 6:30 p.m., ESPN+		Louisiana–Monroe	W 63–62	6–5	16 – Ray	9 – Nicholas Jr.	2 – Tied	Bernard Johnson Coliseum (599); Huntsville, TX
December 15, 2023*; 6:30 p.m., ESPN+		Texas State	L 60–73	6–6	16 – Wilkerson	7 – Doumbia	2 – Tied	Bernard Johnson Coliseum (714); Huntsville, TX
December 20, 2023*; 7:00 p.m., ESPN+		at Grand Canyon; C-USA/WAC Alliance	L 64–76	6–7	11 – Barnes	8 – Doumbia	3 – Ray	GCU Arena; Phoenix, AZ
December 28, 2023*; 7:00 p.m., ESPN+		at Texas Tech	L 60–96	6–8	18 – Barnes	6 – Scroggins	5 – Ray	United Supermarkets Arena (12,271); Lubbock, TX
January 2, 2024*; 4:00 p.m., ESPN+		Dallas	W 93–53	7–8	20 – Nicholas Jr.	9 – McGlashan	4 – Tied	Bernard Johnson Coliseum (616); Huntsville, TX
Conference USA regular season
January 6, 2024; 4:30 p.m., ESPN+		Louisiana Tech	W 81–77	8–8 (1–0)	24 – Wilkerson	9 – Nicholas Jr.	5 – Wilkerson	Bernard Johnson Coliseum (1,183); Huntsville, TX
January 10, 2024; 6:30 p.m., ESPN+		Western Kentucky	W 78–74	9–8 (2–0)	21 – Wilkerson	7 – Ray	7 – Ray	Bernard Johnson Coliseum (714); Huntsville, TX
January 13, 2024; 5:00 p.m., ESPN+		at Middle Tennessee	W 60–51	10–8 (3–0)	27 – Wilkerson	13 – Nicholas Jr.	1 – Tied	Murphy Center (3,227); Murfreesboro, TN
January 20, 2024; 6:00 p.m., ESPN+		at Liberty	L 66–82	10–9 (3–1)	23 – Wilkerson	7 – Scroggins	3 – Ray	Liberty Arena (4,005); Lynchburg, VA
January 25, 2024; 6:30 p.m., CBSSN		New Mexico State	W 79–67	11–9 (4–1)	20 – Barnes	9 – Doumbia	5 – Tied	Bernard Johnson Coliseum (2,546); Huntsville, TX
January 27, 2024; 4:30 p.m., ESPN+		UTEP	W 60–56	12–9 (5–1)	16 – Wilkerson	13 – Nicholas Jr.	4 – Barnes	Bernard Johnson Coliseum (1,993); Huntsville, TX
February 1, 2024; 8:00 p.m., CBSSN		at Western Kentucky	W 79–77	13–9 (6–1)	21 – Barnes	7 – Barnes	5 – Tied	E. A. Diddle Arena (3,757); Bowling Green, KY
February 3, 2024; 1:00 p.m., ESPN+		at FIU	L 61–68	13–10 (6–2)	11 – Barnes	8 – Tied	3 – Barnes	Ocean Bank Convocation Center (1,179); Miami, FL
February 8, 2024; 6:00 p.m., ESPN+		at Jacksonville State	L 68–79	13–11 (6–3)	15 – Huefner	4 – Tied	9 – Boykin	Pete Mathews Coliseum (2,121); Jacksonville, AL
February 15, 2024; 6:30 p.m., ESPN+		FIU	W 70–56	14–11 (7–3)	14 – Wilkerson	8 – Doumbia	6 – Ray	Bernard Johnson Coliseum (1,395); Huntsville, TX
February 17, 2024; 6:30 p.m., ESPN+		Liberty	W 83–73	15–11 (8–3)	16 – Barnes	6 – Tied	4 – Ray	Bernard Johnson Coliseum (1,547); Huntsville, TX
February 22, 2024; 8:00 p.m., CBSSN		at New Mexico State	W 79–58	16–11 (9–3)	25 – Wilkerson	8 – Scroggins	8 – Ray	Pan American Center (10,392); Las Cruces, NM
February 24, 2024; 8:00 p.m., ESPN+		at UTEP	W 65–54	17–11 (10–3)	14 – Huefner	10 – Doumbia	4 – Ray	Don Haskins Center (5,010); El Paso, TX
March 2, 2024; 7:00 p.m., ESPNU		Middle Tennessee	W 81–64	18–11 (11–3)	23 – Barnes	8 – Scroggins	5 – Ray	Bernard Johnson Coliseum (2,423); Huntsville, TX
March 7, 2024; 8:00 p.m., CBSSN		at Louisiana Tech	W 72–66	19–11 (12–3)	14 – Ray	6 – Tied	8 – Ray	Thomas Assembly Center (3,092); Ruston, LA
March 9, 2024; 2:00 p.m., ESPN+		Jacksonville State	W 81–73	20–11 (13–3)	22 – Doumbia	11 – Doumbia	3 – Tied	Bernard Johnson Coliseum (2,442); Huntsville, TX
Conference USA tournament
March 13, 2024; 5:30 p.m., ESPN+	(1)	vs. (9) FIU; Quarterfinals	W 78–59	21–11	15 – Barnes	13 – Scroggins	4 – Ray	Von Braun Center (628); Huntsville, AL
March 15, 2024; 11:30 a.m., CBSSN	(1)	vs. (5) UTEP; Semifinals	L 63–65	21–12	14 – Tied	6 – Tied	3 – Ray	Von Braun Center; Huntsville, AL
*Non-conference game. ^{#}Rankings from AP Poll. (#) Tournament seedings in parentheses. All times are in Central.
