= Steve Lutz =

American basketball coach (born 1972)

Current position
- Title: Head coach
- Team: Oklahoma State
- Conference: Big 12
- Record: 41–35 (.539)

Biographical details
- Born: October 25, 1972 (age 54); San Antonio, Texas, U.S.

Playing career
- 1991–1992: Ranger Junior College
- 1992–1995: Texas Lutheran

Coaching career (HC unless noted)
- 1995–1999: Incarnate Word (asst.)
- 1999–2000: Garden City CC (asst.)
- 2000–2006: Stephen F. Austin (asst.)
- 2006–2010: SMU (asst.)
- 2010–2017: Creighton (asst.)
- 2017–2021: Purdue (asst.)
- 2021–2023: Texas A&M–Corpus Christi
- 2023–2024: Western Kentucky
- 2024–present: Oklahoma State

Head coaching record
- Overall: 110–70 (.611)
- Tournaments: 1–3 (NCAA Division I); 3–2 (NIT)

Accomplishments and honors

Championships
- 2 Southland tournament (2022, 2023); Southland regular season (2023); C-USA tournament (2024)

Awards
- Southland Coach of the Year (2023)

Steve Lutz (born October 25, 1972) is an American college basketball coach who is currently the head coach at Oklahoma State University. He previously served as the head coach at Texas A&M–Corpus Christi and Western Kentucky.

== Early life ==
Lutz grew up in San Antonio, Texas and played basketball and baseball for East Central High School, graduating in 1991. He then played one season of basketball at Ranger Junior College before arriving at Texas Lutheran.

== Coaching career ==
=== Early coaching career ===
Lutz started his coaching career with stops at University of Incarnate Word and Garden City CC (Kansas). During his four seasons at UIW, the Crusaders (now Cardinals) went 99–20.

=== Stephen F. Austin ===
Lutz spent the next six seasons (2000-2006) under coach Danny Kaspar.

=== SMU ===
Lutz spent six seasons at SMU (2006–2010) under coach Matt Doherty.

=== Creighton ===
Lutz spent seven seasons at Creighton (2010–2017) under coach Greg McDermott.

=== Purdue ===
Lutz spent four seasons as an assistant coach at Purdue (2017–2021). In 2020–21, Lutz coached Jaden Ivey prior to Ivey's #5 overall draft pick in the 2022 NBA draft. Lutz was the Boilermakers' defensive guru working with head coach Matt Painter.

=== Texas A&M–Corpus Christi ===
Lutz spent two seasons as the head coach at Texas A&M–Corpus Christi (2021–2023). Turning the program around, Lutz finished with a 47–23 record (.671) during those two years. Lutz also led the Islanders to a Southland Conference regular season champions, two time Southland Conference tournament champions, and the program’s first ever NCAA tournament victory against Southeast Missouri State.

=== Western Kentucky ===
On March 18, 2023, Lutz was announced as the new head coach at Western Kentucky. In his lone season at Western Kentucky, Lutz finished with a 22-12 record including a Conference USA Tournament Championship, which is the school's first ever since joining the conference in 2014 and another trip to the NCAA tournament, which is the school's first tournament appearance since 2013.

=== Oklahoma State ===
On April 1, 2024, Lutz was announced as the new head coach at Oklahoma State.

== Head coaching record ==
Record table
Season	Team	Overall	Conference	Standing	Postseason
Texas A&M–Corpus Christi Islanders (Southland Conference) (2021–2023)
2021–22	Texas A&M–Corpus Christi	23–12	7–7	4th	NCAA Division I First Four
2022–23	Texas A&M–Corpus Christi	24–11	14–4	1st	NCAA Division I Round of 64
Texas A&M–Corpus Christi:		47–23 (.671)	21–11 (.656)		
Western Kentucky Hilltoppers (Conference USA) (2023–2024)
2023–24	Western Kentucky	22–12	8–8	3rd	NCAA Division I Round of 64
Western Kentucky:		22–12 (.647)	8–8 (.500)		
Oklahoma State Cowboys (Big 12 Conference) (2024–present)
2024–25	Oklahoma State	17–18	7–13	T–12th	NIT Quarterfinals
2025–26	Oklahoma State	20–15	6–12	T–13th	NIT Second Round
2026–27	Oklahoma State	4-2			
Oklahoma State:		41–35 (.539)	13–25 (.342)		
Total:		110–70 (.611)			
National champion Postseason invitational champion Conference regular season champion Conference regular season and conference tournament champion Division regular season champion Division regular season and conference tournament champion Conference tournament champion

== Personal life ==
Lutz and his wife, Shannon, have two daughters and a son.
