= 2023–24 New Mexico State Aggies men's basketball team =

American college basketball season

2023–24 New Mexico State Aggies men's basketball
- Conference: Conference USA
- Record: 13–19 (7–9 C-USA)
- Head coach: Jason Hooten (1st season)
- Associate head coach: Kenneth Mangrum
- Assistant coaches: Zach Settembre; Payne Andrus
- Home arena: Pan American Center

2023–24 Conference USA men's basketball standings
	Conf.				Overall
Team	W		L	PCT	W		L	PCT
Sam Houston	13	–	3	.813	21	–	12	.636
Louisiana Tech	12	–	4	.750	22	–	10	.688
Western Kentucky †	8	–	8	.500	22	–	12	.647
Liberty	7	–	9	.438	18	–	14	.563
UTEP	7	–	9	.438	18	–	16	.529
New Mexico State	7	–	9	.438	13	–	19	.406
Middle Tennessee	7	–	9	.438	14	–	19	.424
Jacksonville State	6	–	10	.375	14	–	18	.438
FIU	5	–	11	.313	11	–	22	.333
† 2024 CUSA tournament winner

The 2023–24 New Mexico State Aggies men's basketball team represented New Mexico State University in the 2023–24 NCAA Division I men's basketball season. The Aggies were led by first-year head coach Jason Hooten and played their home games at the Pan American Center in Las Cruces, New Mexico as first-year members of the Conference USA. They finished the season 13–19, 7–9 in C-USA play to finish in a four-way tie for fourth place. As the No. 6 seed in the C-USA tournament, they lost to Western Kentucky in the quarterfinals.

== Previous season ==
The Aggies finished the 2022–23 season 9–15, 2–16 in Western Athletic Conference play to finish in last place. On February 10, 2023, the school announced the men's basketball program's season would be cancelled based on new reports of violations of university policies. The rest of the team's games were canceled and were deemed forfeits by the WAC. The NCAA does not recognize the forfeited games as part of the team's overall record. They did not take part in the WAC Tournament.

On November 19, 2022, there were reports of a shooting between a student attending the University of New Mexico and a New Mexico State basketball player, leaving the student dead. The basketball player was later identified as Mike Peake, who was wounded on the UNM main campus in Albuquerque. A day later, on November 20, 2022, the New Mexico State Police released details of the shooting, including the arrest of 17-year old Mya Hill. The next day, the New Mexico State Police confirmed a second arrest relating to the shooting, arresting 19-year old Jonathan Smith.

The Aggies and Lobos were slated to renew the Rio Grande Rivalry on the night of the shooting, but the game was postponed. Three days later, both schools decided to cancel the Rio Grande Rivalry for the season due to safety concerns. On December 5, NM State Athletic Director Mario Moccia announced the indefinite suspension of the 21-year old Mike Peake. No charges have been filed against Peake in what was called a "self-defense situation", but there are two investigations surrounding the shooting.

On February 10, New Mexico State University announced the men's basketball program's season would be cancelled based on new reports of violations of university policies. Its entire coaching staff was placed on administrative leave as a result. KTSM reported that the season was suspended because of allegations of hazing by at least three different players multiple times.

On February 14, head coach Greg Heiar was officially fired by NMSU. On March 24, the school named Sam Houston head coach Jason Hooten the team's new head coach.

The season marked the school's last in the Western Athletic Conference. The school joined Conference USA in 2023.

== Offseason ==
=== Departures ===
Name	Number	Pos.	Height	Weight	Year	Hometown	Reason for departure
Anthony Roy	0	G	6'5"	200	Sophomore	Oakland, CA	Transferred
Marchelus Avery	1	F	6'8"	215	Sophomore	Richmond, VA	Transferred to UCF
Issa Muhammad	2	F	6'9"	240	RS Junior	Atlanta, GA	Transferred to UT Martin
Xavier Pinson	3	G	6'2"	175	Senior	Chicago, IL	Graduated/signed with Montreal Alliance in the CEBL
James Beck	4	F	6'8"	215	RS Senior	Grand Rapids, MI	Graduated
Kyle Feit	5	G	6'4"	190	Junior	Boca Raton, FL	Transferred
DaJuan Quaye Gordon	11	G	6'5"	195	Junior	Chicago, IL	Transferred to UT Arlington
Doctor Bradley	13	F	6'8"	205	Sophomore	Los Angeles, CA	Transferred to Northern Illinois
Shahar Lazar	14	G	6'3"	200	Freshman	Emunim, Israel	Transferred to Gardner–Webb
Mike Peake	15	F	6'7"	218	Junior	Chicago, IL	Transferred
Ziri Blackwood	21	G	6'3'	170	Sophomore	Killeen, TX	Walk-on; transferred
Deuce Benjamin	22	G	6'1"	175	Freshman	Las Cruces, NM	Walk-on; transferred
Ethan Anderson	23	F	6'9"	220	Freshman	Kaysville, UT	Walk-on; transferred
Kim Aiken Jr.	24	F	6'7"	215	RS Senior	Redlands, CA	Graduated
Jaden Alexander	25	G	6'4"	200	Freshman	Vallejo, CA	Transferred to Cal State Bakersfield
Isaac Shingange	31	F	6'5"	180	Freshman	New York, NY	Walk-on; transferred
Shakiru Odunewu	34	F	6'10"	245	RS Sophomore	Providence, RI	Transferred
Vuk Vucevic	35	F	6'6"	190	Freshman	Paris, France	Walk-on; transferred
Deshawndre Washington	42	G	6'7"	205	Junior	Chicago, IL	Transferred

=== Incoming transfers ===
Name	Number	Pos.	Height	Weight	Year	Hometown	Previous college
Jaylin Jackson-Posey	0	G	6'2"	196	Junior	Midland, TX	Stephen F. Austin
Kaosi Ezeagu	1	F	6'10"	255	Senior	Brampton, ON	Sam Houston
Jordan Rawls	2	G	6'1"	185	GS Senior	Chattanooga, TN	Western Kentucky
Christian Cook	3	G	6'2"	175	Junior	Oklahoma City, OK	Northeastern State
Brandon Suggs	4	G/F	6'6"	185	GS Senior	Powder Springs, GA	UCF
Rakeim Gary	9	G	5'10"	165	Senior	Dallas, TX	South Carolina State
Femi Odukale	11	G	6'6"	205	Senior	Brooklyn, NY	Seton Hall
Jaden Harris	13	G	6'4"	190	Junior	Atlanta, GA	South Plains College
Robert Carpenter	21	F	6'7"	210	Senior	Detroit, MI	Mississippi Valley State
Jonathan Kanyanga	24	C	6'9"	225	GS Senior	Kinshasa, Congo	Edward Waters
Clarence Jackson	25	F	6'7"	225	Senior	Dublin, GA	Jacksonville State
Davion Bradford	26	F	7'0"	270	Senior	St. Louis, MO	Wake Forest

=== 2023 recruiting class ===
College recruiting information
Name	Hometown	School	Height	Weight	Commit date
Lewis Duarte #45 SF	Garden Grove, CA	Veritas Prep	6 ft 5 in (1.96 m)	165 lb (75 kg)	
Lewis Duarte #45 SF	Recruit ratings: Rivals: 247Sports: (79)				
Keylon Dorsey; SG	Houston, TX	Aldine Eisenhower High School	6 ft 4 in (1.93 m)	185 lb (84 kg)	
Keylon Dorsey; SG	Recruit ratings: 247Sports:				
Overall recruit ranking:
Note: In many cases, Scout, Rivals, 247Sports, On3, and ESPN may conflict in their listings of height and weight.; In these cases, the average was taken. ESPN grades are on a 100-point scale.; Sources: "2023 New Mexico State Basketball Commits". ESPN.

== Roster ==
2023–24 New Mexico State Aggies men's basketball team
Players
Coaches

Pos.	#	Name	Height	Weight	Year	Previous school	Hometown
G	0	Jaylin Jackson-Posey	6 ft 2 in (1.88 m)	196 lb (89 kg)	Jr	Stephen F. Austin	Midland, TX
F	1	Kaosi Ezeagu	6 ft 10 in (2.08 m)	255 lb (116 kg)	Sr	Sam Houston State	Brampton, ON
G	2	Jordan Rawls	6 ft 2 in (1.88 m)	185 lb (84 kg)	GS	Western Kentucky	Chattanooga, TN
G	3	Christian Cook	6 ft 2 in (1.88 m)	175 lb (79 kg)	Jr	Northeastern State	Oklahoma City, OK
G	4	Brandon Suggs (EEP)	6 ft 6 in (1.98 m)	185 lb (84 kg)	GS	UCF	Powder Springs, GA
G	5	Keylon Dorsey	6 ft 5 in (1.96 m)	185 lb (84 kg)	Fr	Eisenhower	Houston, TX
F	6	Christopher Biekeu (injured)	6 ft 7 in (2.01 m)	235 lb (107 kg)	Sr	Towson	Montréal, Quebec, Canada
G	9	Tanahj Pettway	6 ft 2 in (1.88 m)	185 lb (84 kg)	Sr	Stony Brook	Worcester, MA
G	11	Femi Odukale	6 ft 6 in (1.98 m)	205 lb (93 kg)	Sr	Seton Hall	Brooklyn, NY
G	12	Lewis Duarte (N)	6 ft 5 in (1.96 m)	185 lb (84 kg)	Fr	Victory Christian Center School	Santo Domingo, DR
G	13	Jaden Harris	6 ft 4 in (1.93 m)	190 lb (86 kg)	Jr	South Plains College	Atlanta, GA
F	14	Yaak Yaak	6 ft 11 in (2.11 m)	—	Fr	NBA Academy	Adelaide, Australia
F	21	Robert Carpenter	6 ft 7 in (2.01 m)	210 lb (95 kg)	Jr	Mississippi Valley State	Detroit, MI
F	24	Jonathan Kanyanga	6 ft 9 in (2.06 m)	225 lb (102 kg)	GS	Edwards Waters	Kinshasa, Congo
F	25	Clarence Jackson (EEP)	6 ft 7 in (2.01 m)	225 lb (102 kg)	Sr	Jacksonville State	Dublin, GA
F	26	Davion Bradford (T)	7 ft 0 in (2.13 m)	270 lb (122 kg)	Sr	Wake Forest	St. Louis, MO

Head coach

- Jason Hooten (Tarleton State)

Assistant coach(es)

- Kenneth Mangrum (North Texas)
- Zach Settembre (LSU–Shreveport)
- Payne Andrus (Mid-American Nazarene)

Legend

- (C) Team captain
- (S) Suspended
- (I) Ineligible
- (W) Walk-on
- (EEP) Early exit pro
- (T) In-season transfer out
- (N) Did not play during season and removed from roster
- Injured
- Current redshirt

Roster
Last update: March 15, 2024

== Schedule and results ==
Date time, TV	Rank^{#}	Opponent^{#}	Result	Record	High points	High rebounds	High assists	Site (attendance) city, state
Non-conference regular season
November 6, 2023*; 6:00 p.m., SECN		at No. 16 Kentucky	L 46–86	0–1	10 – Tied	8 – Jackson-Posey	6 – Jackson-Posey	Rupp Arena (18,438); Lexington, KY
November 8, 2023*; 7:00 p.m., ESPN+		Sul Ross State	W 84–49	1–1	15 – Rawls	9 – Ezeagu	4 – Rawls	Pan American Center (4,507); Las Cruces, NM
November 11, 2023*; 8:00 p.m., ESPN+		at UC Irvine	L 74–91	1–2	18 – Carpenter	8 – Ezeagu	3 – Tied	Bren Events Center (2,731); Irvine, CA
November 14, 2023*; 7:00 p.m., ESPN+		Western New Mexico	W 78–43	2–2	24 – Harris	7 – Tied	7 – Rawls	Pan American Center (5,908); Las Cruces, NM
November 18, 2023*; 7:00 p.m., ESPN+		Northern Colorado; Cancún Challenge campus site game	W 76–71	3–2	26 – Cook	8 – Odukale	3 – Tied	Pan American Center (5,656); Las Cruces, NM
November 21, 2023*; 6:30 p.m., CBSSN		vs. Fresno State; Cancún Challenge Riviera Division semifinals	L 76–81 ^{OT}	3–3	20 – Carpenter	7 – Odukale	10 – Rawls	Hard Rock Hotel Riviera Maya (516); Cancún, Mexico
November 22, 2023*; 4:00 p.m., CBSSN		vs. Southern Illinois; Cancún Challenge Riviera Division consolation	L 54–81	3–4	18 – Odukale	8 – Odukale	5 – Rawls	Hard Rock Hotel Riviera Maya (317); Cancún, Mexico
November 26, 2023*; 11:00 a.m., ACCNX/ESPN+		at Louisville	L 84–90 ^{OT}	3–5	20 – Rawls	8 – Ezeagu	6 – Jackson-Posey	KFC Yum! Center (10,527); Louisville, KY
November 28, 2023*; 7:00 p.m., ESPN+		Southwest	W 84–49	4–5	13 – Jackson	11 – Ezeagu	8 – Jackson-Posey	Pan American Center (4,135); Las Cruces, NM
December 2, 2023*; 7:00 p.m., MW Network		at New Mexico; Rio Grande Rivalry	L 62–106	4–6	18 – Odukale	7 – Tied	3 – Tied	The Pit (15,435); Albuquerque, NM
December 12, 2023*; 7:30 p.m., ESPN+		Northern New Mexico	W 76–71	5–6	14 – Ezeagu	5 – Tied	6 – Rawls	Pan American Center (3,961); Las Cruces, NM
December 16, 2023*; 7:00 p.m., CBSSN		New Mexico; Rio Grande Rivalry	L 72–73	5–7	22 – Jackson-Posey	8 – Ezeagu	4 – Rawls	Pan American Center (5,182); Las Cruces, NM
December 20, 2023*; 5:30 p.m., ESPN+		at Stephen F. Austin; C–USA/WAC Alliance	L 72–75	5–8	14 – Cook	5 – Tied	6 – Jackson-Posey	William R. Johnson Coliseum (1,710); Nacogdoches, TX
December 22, 2023*; 6:00 p.m., ESPN+		at Tulsa	L 59–65	5–9	12 – Odukale	7 – Tied	4 – Rawls	Reynolds Center (2,871); Tulsa, OK
December 30, 2023*; 7:00 p.m., ESPN+		California Baptist; C–USA/WAC Alliance	W 66–61	6–9	20 – Carpenter	7 – Carpenter	6 – Rawls	Pan American Center (4,226); Las Cruces, NM
Conference USA regular season
January 4, 2024; 7:00 p.m., CBSSN		UTEP; Battle of I-10	W 63–53	7–9 (1–0)	15 – Cook	7 – Ezeagu	4 – Rawls	Pan American Center (5,216); Las Cruces, NM
January 11, 2024; 5:00 p.m., ESPN+		at FIU	L 67–77	7–10 (1–1)	16 – Odukale	6 – Odukale	4 – Rawls	Ocean Bank Convocation Center (1,294); Miami, FL
January 18, 2024; 7:00 p.m., ESPN+		Western Kentucky	W 72–70	8–10 (2–1)	19 – Pettway	7 – Ezeagu	6 – Odukale	Pan American Center (5,243); Las Cruces, NM
January 20, 2024; 7:00 p.m., ESPN+		Middle Tennessee	W 73–62	9–10 (3–1)	17 – Carpenter	8 – Odukale	7 – Rawls	Pan American Center (4,634); Las Cruces, NM
January 25, 2024; 7:00 p.m., CBSSN		at Sam Houston	L 67–79	9–11 (3–2)	18 – Rawls	7 – Odukale	2 – Rawls	Bernard Johnson Coliseum (2,546); Huntsville, TX
January 27, 2024; 1:00 p.m., ESPN+		at Louisiana Tech	L 53–73	9–12 (3–3)	10 – Rawls	9 – Ezeagu	2 – Rawls	Thomas Assembly Center (2,464); Ruston, LA
February 1, 2024; 7:00 p.m., ESPN+		Liberty	W 79–73 ^{OT}	10–12 (4–3)	27 – Cook	10 – Odukale	4 – Odukale	Pan American Center; Las Cruces, NM
February 3, 2024; 7:00 p.m., ESPN+		Jacksonville State	W 67–65	11–12 (5–3)	17 – Cook	8 – Ezeagu	7 – Odukale	Pan American Center (11,278); Las Cruces, NM
February 10, 2024; 7:00 p.m., ESPN+		at UTEP; Battle of I-10	L 49–74	11–13 (5–4)	20 – Harris	7 – Ezeagu	3 – Odukale	Don Haskins Center (10,511); El Paso, TX
February 15, 2024; 5:30 p.m., ESPN+		at Middle Tennessee	L 69–76	11–14 (5–5)	22 – Harris	11 – Odukale	3 – Tied	Murphy Center (2,890); Murfreesboro, TN
February 17, 2024; 1:00 p.m., ESPN+		at Western Kentucky	L 58–72	11–15 (5–6)	13 – Tied	8 – Odukale	3 – Tied	E. A. Diddle Arena (5,102); Bowling Green, KY
February 22, 2024; 7:00 p.m., CBSSN		Sam Houston	L 58–79	11–16 (5–7)	15 – Ezeagu	7 – Ezeagu	4 – Odukale	Pan American Center (10,392); Las Cruces, NM
February 24, 2024; 7:00 p.m., ESPN+		Louisiana Tech	L 58–67	11–17 (5–8)	16 – Tied	6 – Odukale	3 – Tied	Pan American Center (4,724); Las Cruces, NM
February 29, 2024; 7:00 p.m., CBSSN		at Liberty	L 58–83	11–18 (5–9)	15 – Cook	7 – Tied	3 – Rawls	Liberty Arena (3,262); Lynchburg, VA
March 2, 2024; 3:00 p.m., ESPN+		at Jacksonville State	W 66–64	12–18 (6–9)	15 – Tied	12 – Ezeagu	4 – Rawls	Pete Mathews Coliseum (1,822); Jacksonville, AL
March 9, 2024; 2:00 p.m., ESPN+		FIU	W 77–70	13–18 (7–9)	26 – Cook	12 – Odukale	8 – Odukale	Pan American Center (4,864); Las Cruces, NM
Conference USA Tournament
March 14, 2024; 7:00 p.m., ESPN+	(6)	vs. (3) Western Kentucky; Quarterfinals	L 69–89	13–19	20 – Cook	9 – Ezeagu	3 – Odukale	Von Braun Center (2,333); Huntsville, AL
*Non-conference game. ^{#}Rankings from AP Poll. (#) Tournament seedings in parentheses. All times are in Mountain.
