= 2023–24 Jacksonville State Gamecocks men's basketball team =

American college basketball season

2023–24 Jacksonville State Gamecocks men's basketball
- Conference: Conference USA
- Record: 14–18 (6–10 C-USA)
- Head coach: Ray Harper (8th season)
- Assistant coaches: Tommy Wade; Dennan Morrow; Marcus Belcher
- Home arena: Pete Mathews Coliseum

2023–24 Conference USA men's basketball standings
| | Conf. | | | | Overall |
| Team | W | | L | PCT | W | | L | PCT |
|---|---|---|---|---|---|---|---|---|
| Sam Houston | 13 | – | 3 | .813 | 21 | – | 12 | .636 |
| Louisiana Tech | 12 | – | 4 | .750 | 22 | – | 10 | .688 |
| Western Kentucky † | 8 | – | 8 | .500 | 22 | – | 12 | .647 |
| Liberty | 7 | – | 9 | .438 | 18 | – | 14 | .563 |
| UTEP | 7 | – | 9 | .438 | 18 | – | 16 | .529 |
| New Mexico State | 7 | – | 9 | .438 | 13 | – | 19 | .406 |
| Middle Tennessee | 7 | – | 9 | .438 | 14 | – | 19 | .424 |
| Jacksonville State | 6 | – | 10 | .375 | 14 | – | 18 | .438 |
| FIU | 5 | – | 11 | .313 | 11 | – | 22 | .333 |
† 2024 CUSA tournament winner

The 2023–24 Jacksonville State Gamecocks men's basketball team represented Jacksonville State University in the 2023–24 NCAA Division I men's basketball season. The Gamecocks, led by eighth-year head coach Ray Harper, played home games at the Pete Mathews Coliseum in Jacksonville, Alabama as first-year members of the Conference USA.

== Previous season ==
The Gamecocks finished the 2022–23 season 13–18, 6–12 in ASUN play to finish in a tie for 11th place. They failed to qualify for the ASUN tournament.

== Offseason ==
=== Departures ===
| Name | Number | Pos. | Height | Weight | Year | Hometown | Reason for departure |
|---|---|---|---|---|---|---|---|
| DJ Gordon | 0 | G | 6'5" | 175 | Sophomore | Garfield, PA | Transferred |
| Demaree King | 1 | G | 6'0" | 180 | Senior | Tulsa, OK | Graduated |
| Cam McDowell | 2 | G | 6'5" | 185 | Sophomore | Powder Springs, GA | Transferred |
| Maros Zeliznak | 3 | C | 6'11" | 265 | Senior | Košice, Slovakia | Graduated |
| Skyelar Potter | 5 | G | 6'3" | 198 | RS Senior | Bowling Green, KY | Left the team for personal reasons |
| Peyton Daniels | 13 | G | 6'2" | 185 | Sophomore | Ellenwood, GA | Transferred |
| JJ Platt | 15 | G | 6'1" | 180 | RS Freshman | Nashville, TN | Walk-on; transferred |
| Amanze Ngumezi | 24 | F | 6'9" | 245 | RS Junior | Savannah, GA | Transferred to Morehead State |
| Clarence Jackson | 25 | F | 6'7" | 225 | Junior | Dublin, GA | Transferred to New Mexico State |
| Arda Duraklar | 35 | C | 6'11" | 232 | Freshman | İzmir, Turkey | Transferred |

=== Incoming transfers ===
| Name | Number | Pos. | Height | Weight | Year | Hometown | Previous college |
|---|---|---|---|---|---|---|---|
| Caleb Johnson | 0 | F | 6'5" | 200 | Junior | North Preston, NS | Vincennes |
| Quincy Clark | 1 | G | 6'2" | 180 | Junior | Westerville, OH | Lipscomb |
| Ivan Reynolds | 5 | G | 6'4" | 200 | Junior | Pompano Beach, FL | Cal State Bakersfield |
| Matt Mayers | 13 | F | 6'8" | 210 | GS Senior | Hastings-on-Hudson, NY | Robert Morris |
| Andres Burney | 23 | F | 6'9" | 210 | Junior | Brundidge, AL | Eastern Florida State College |
| KyKy Tandy | 24 | G | 6'2" | 190 | GS Senior | Hopkinsville, KY | Xavier |

=== 2023 recruiting class ===
College recruiting information
| Name | Hometown | School | Height | Weight | Commit date |
|---|---|---|---|---|---|
| Alex Odam; SG | Piedmont, AL | Piedmont High School | 6 ft 3 in (1.91 m) | 175 lb (79 kg) | Mar 25, 2021 |
| Alex Odam; SG | Recruit ratings: No ratings found | | | | |
Overall recruit ranking:
Note: In many cases, Scout, Rivals, 247Sports, On3, and ESPN may conflict in their listings of height and weight.; In these cases, the average was taken. ESPN grades are on a 100-point scale.; Sources: "2023 Jacksonville State Basketball Commits". ESPN.

== Roster ==
2023–24 Jacksonville State Gamecocks men's basketball team
Players
Coaches

| Pos. | # | Name | Height | Weight | Year | Previous school | Hometown |
|---|---|---|---|---|---|---|---|
| F | 0 | Caleb Johnson | 6 ft 7 in (2.01 m) | 200 lb (91 kg) | Jr | Father Henry Carr; Vincennes | North Preston, NS |
| G | 1 | Quincy Clark | 6 ft 2 in (1.88 m) | 180 lb (82 kg) | Jr | Westerville Central HS; Lipscomb | Westerville, OH |
| F | 2 | Juwan Perdue | 6 ft 6 in (1.98 m) | 200 lb (91 kg) | Sr | Lakewood HS | Sumter, SC |
| G | 3 | Travis Roberts | 6 ft 6 in (1.98 m) | 205 lb (93 kg) | So | Bishop Walsh School | Waldorf, MD |
| F | 4 | Marcellus Brigham Jr. | 6 ft 7 in (2.01 m) | 210 lb (95 kg) | Jr | Briarcrest Christian HS | Memphis, TN |
| G | 5 | Ivan Reynolds | 6 ft 4 in (1.93 m) | 200 lb (91 kg) | Jr | Dillard HS; Cal State Bakersfield | Pompano Beach, FL |
| G | 10 | Brad Lewis (W) | 6 ft 4 in (1.93 m) | 175 lb (79 kg) | RS So | Thompson HS; Central State | Alabaster, AL |
| G | 11 | Alex Odam | 6 ft 3 in (1.91 m) | 175 lb (79 kg) | Fr | Piedmont HS | Piedmont, AL |
| F | 13 | Matt Mayers | 6 ft 8 in (2.03 m) | 210 lb (95 kg) | GS | Hastings-On-Hudson HS; Robert Morris | Hastings-on-Hudson, NY |
| F | 20 | Gora Niang | 6 ft 7 in (2.01 m) | 190 lb (86 kg) | Fr | Central Pointe Christian Academy (FL) | Richard Toll, Senegal |
| G | 22 | Tyre Patterson (W) | 6 ft 2 in (1.88 m) | 185 lb (84 kg) | Fr | Athens HS | Athens, AL |
| F | 23 | Andres Burney | 6 ft 9 in (2.06 m) | 210 lb (95 kg) | Jr | Pike County HS; Eastern Florida | Brundidge, AL |
| G | 24 | KyKy Tandy | 6 ft 2 in (1.88 m) | 190 lb (86 kg) | GS | University Heights Academy; Xavier | Hopkinsville, KY |
| C | 50 | Mason Nicholson | 6 ft 10 in (2.08 m) | 280 lb (127 kg) | Jr | Gary West Side HS; Northwest Florida State College | Gary, IN |
| G | 55 | Thomas Curlee (W) | 6 ft 3 in (1.91 m) | 165 lb (75 kg) | Fr | Faith Christian Academy | Anniston, AL |

Head coach

- Ray Harper (Kentucky Wesleyan)

Assistant coach(es)

- Tommy Wade (Southeast Missouri State)
- Dennan Morrow (Kansas State)
- Marcus Belcher (Southern Illinois)

Legend

- (C) Team captain
- (S) Suspended
- (I) Ineligible
- (W) Walk-on
- Injured
- Current redshirt

Roster

== Schedule and results ==
| Date time, TV | Rank^{#} | Opponent^{#} | Result | Record | High points | High rebounds | High assists | Site (attendance) city, state |
Exhibition
| November 1, 2023*; 6:00 p.m. | | Talladega | W 78–49 | | 18 – Tandy | 5 – Odam | 5 – Odam | Pete Mathews Coliseum (1,011); Jacksonville, AL |
Non-conference regular season
| November 7, 2023*; 11:30 a.m., ESPN+ | | Brescia | W 91–41 | 1–0 | 12 – Tied | 9 – Burney | 5 – Tied | Pete Mathews Coliseum (2,107); Jacksonville, AL |
| November 11, 2023*; 2:00 p.m., ESPN+ | | Utah Tech; C-USA/WAC Alliance | L 79–81 ^{OT} | 1–1 | 23 – Tandy | 6 – Johnson | 3 – Johnson | Pete Mathews Coliseum (1,123); Jacksonville, AL |
| November 14, 2023*; 6:00 p.m., ESPN+ | | at West Virginia | L 57–70 | 1–2 | 18 – Tandy | 8 – Tied | 4 – Clark | WVU Coliseum (9,218); Morgantown, WV |
| November 18, 2023*; 7:15 p.m., ESPN+ | | at North Alabama | L 59–61 | 1–3 | 14 – Tandy | 7 – Perdue | 3 – Tied | Flowers Hall (1,571); Florence, AL |
| November 22, 2023*; 7:00 p.m., ESPN+ | | at Incarnate Word | L 66–67 | 1–4 | 19 – Tandy | 10 – Perdue | 4 – Odam | McDermott Center (86); San Antonio, TX |
| November 24, 2023*; 3:00 p.m., ESPN+ | | at UTSA; Roadrunner/Cardinal Classic | W 77–62 | 2–4 | 16 – Tied | 5 – Tied | 7 – Clark | Convocation Center (676); San Antonio, TX |
| November 26, 2023*; 3:00 p.m. | | vs. Incarnate Word; Roadrunner/Cardinal Classic | W 67–65 | 3–4 | 20 – Tandy | 6 – Mayers | 4 – Tied | Convocation Center; San Antonio, TX |
| November 30, 2023*; 6:00 p.m., ESPN+ | | South Alabama | W 70–52 | 4–4 | 29 – Tandy | 6 – Tied | 7 – Clark | Pete Mathews Coliseum (1,865); Jacksonville, AL |
| December 3, 2023*; 2:00 p.m., ESPN+ | | East Tennessee State | L 59–61 | 4–5 | 13 – Perdue | 11 – Perdue | 3 – Clark | Pete Mathews Coliseum (1,203); Jacksonville, AL |
| December 8, 2023*; 6:00 p.m., ESPN+ | | UIC | L 49–55 | 4–6 | 12 – Burney | 4 – Tied | 2 – Tied | Pete Mathews Coliseum (1,657); Jacksonville, AL |
| December 14, 2023*; 7:00 p.m., BTN | | at No. 23 Wisconsin | L 60–75 | 4–7 | 16 – Tandy | 5 – Nicholson | 3 – Clark | Kohl Center (12,816); Madison, WI |
| December 18, 2023*; 7:00 p.m., ESPN+ | | at Tarleton State; C-USA/WAC Alliance | W 65–62 | 5–7 | 16 – Tandy | 8 – Nicholson | 3 – Clark | Wisdom Gymnasium (1,754); Stephenville, TX |
| December 21, 2023*; 2:00 p.m., ESPN+ | | at Little Rock | W 90–60 | 6–7 | 25 – Tandy | 11 – Burney | 3 – Reynolds | Jack Stephens Center (1,256); Little Rock, AR |
| December 28, 2023*; 6:00 p.m., ESPN+ | | Fort Valley State | W 93–57 | 7–7 | 20 – Tandy | 8 – Tied | 6 – Odam | Pete Mathews Coliseum (1,432); Jacksonville, AL |
| December 31, 2023*; 4:00 p.m., ESPN+ | | Trevecca Nazarene | W 107–67 | 8–7 | 25 – Tandy | 9 – Perdue | 11 – Odam | Pete Mathews Coliseum (1,024); Jacksonville, AL |
Conference USA regular season
| January 6, 2024; 4:00 p.m., ESPN+ | | FIU | W 70–63 | 9–7 (1–0) | 35 – Tandy | 11 – Perdue | 4 – Tied | Pete Mathews Coliseum (2,188); Jacksonville, AL |
| January 10, 2024; 6:00 p.m., ESPN+ | | at Liberty | W 61–51 | 10–7 (2–0) | 14 – Tandy | 6 – Tied | 4 – Clark | Liberty Arena (2,384); Lynchburg, VA |
| January 13, 2024; 4:00 p.m., CBSSN | | at Western Kentucky | L 69–80 | 10–8 (2–1) | 25 – Tandy | 4 – Tied | 3 – Tied | E. A. Diddle Arena (4,580); Bowling Green, KY |
| January 20, 2024; 4:00 p.m., ESPN+ | | Louisiana Tech | L 57–74 | 10–9 (2–2) | 14 – Tied | 6 – Nicholson | 3 – Tandy | Pete Mathews Coliseum (2,120); Jacksonville, AL |
| January 24, 2024; 6:30 p.m., ESPN+ | | at Middle Tennessee | L 67–75 | 10–10 (2–3) | 17 – Johnson | 8 – Nicholson | 5 – Reynolds | Murphy Center (2,605); Murfreesboro, TN |
| January 27, 2024; 4:00 p.m., ESPN+ | | Liberty | W 73–62 | 11–10 (3–3) | 25 – Tandy | 10 – Clark | 3 – Tied | Pete Mathews Coliseum (2,835); Jacksonville, AL |
| February 1, 2024; 8:00 p.m., ESPN+ | | at UTEP | L 71–79 | 11–11 (3–4) | 15 – Tandy | 9 – Nicholson | 4 – Clark | Don Haskins Center (3,845); El Paso, TX |
| February 3, 2024; 8:00 p.m., ESPN+ | | at New Mexico State | L 65–67 | 11–12 (3–5) | 16 – Clark | 12 – Perdue | 5 – Clark | Pan American Center (11,278); Las Cruces, NM |
| February 8, 2024; 6:00 p.m., ESPN+ | | Sam Houston | W 79–68 | 12–12 (4–5) | 19 – Tandy | 10 – Nicholson | 6 – Clark | Pete Mathews Coliseum (2,121); Jacksonville, AL |
| February 10, 2024; 4:00 p.m., ESPN+ | | Western Kentucky | L 59–70 | 12–13 (4–6) | 13 – Tandy | 9 – Nicholson | 3 – Tied | Pete Mathews Coliseum (2,433); Jacksonville, AL |
| February 15, 2024; 6:00 p.m., ESPN+ | | at Louisiana Tech | L 58–63 | 12–14 (4–7) | 11 – Perdue | 10 – Nicholson | 2 – Tied | Thomas Assembly Center (2,071); Ruston, LA |
| February 21, 2024; 6:00 p.m., ESPN+ | | Middle Tennessee | W 76–68 | 13–14 (5–7) | 18 – Mayers | 9 – Brigham Jr. | 3 – Tied | Pete Mathews Coliseum (2,167); Jacksonville, AL |
| February 24, 2024; 5:00 p.m., ESPN+ | | at FIU | W 77–75 | 14–14 (6–7) | 20 – Tandy | 6 – Burney | 3 – Tied | Ocean Bank Convocation Center (828); Miami, FL |
| February 29, 2024; 6:00 p.m., ESPN+ | | UTEP | L 65–72 | 14–15 (6–8) | 22 – Tandy | 6 – Nicholson | 4 – Reynolds | Pete Mathews Coliseum (2,025); Jacksonville, AL |
| March 2, 2024; 4:00 p.m., ESPN+ | | New Mexico State | L 64–66 | 14–16 (6–9) | 15 – Tandy | 6 – Nicholson | 4 – Clark | Pete Mathews Coliseum (1,822); Jacksonville, AL |
| March 9, 2024; 2:00 p.m., ESPN+ | | at Sam Houston | L 73–81 | 14–17 (6–10) | 32 – Tandy | 6 – Brigham Jr. | 4 – Reynolds | Bernard Johnson Coliseum (2,442); Huntsville, TX |
Conference USA Tournament
| March 12, 2024; 8:00 p.m., ESPN+ | (8) | vs. (9) FIU; First Round | L 67–76 | 14–18 | 17 – Perdue | 13 – Nicholson | 8 – Clark | Von Braun Center (444); Huntsville, AL |
*Non-conference game. ^{#}Rankings from AP Poll. (#) Tournament seedings in parentheses. All times are in Central.
