= 2023–24 Middle Tennessee Blue Raiders men's basketball team =

American college basketball season

2023–24 Middle Tennessee Blue Raiders men's basketball
- Conference: Conference USA
- Record: 14–19 (7–9 CUSA)
- Head coach: Nick McDevitt (6th season)
- Associate head coach: Wes Long
- Assistant coaches: Logan Johnson; Eric Wilson
- Home arena: Murphy Center

2023–24 Conference USA men's basketball standings
	Conf.				Overall
Team	W		L	PCT	W		L	PCT
Sam Houston	13	–	3	.813	21	–	12	.636
Louisiana Tech	12	–	4	.750	22	–	10	.688
Western Kentucky †	8	–	8	.500	22	–	12	.647
Liberty	7	–	9	.438	18	–	14	.563
UTEP	7	–	9	.438	18	–	16	.529
New Mexico State	7	–	9	.438	13	–	19	.406
Middle Tennessee	7	–	9	.438	14	–	19	.424
Jacksonville State	6	–	10	.375	14	–	18	.438
FIU	5	–	11	.313	11	–	22	.333
† 2024 CUSA tournament winner

The 2023–24 Middle Tennessee Blue Raiders men's basketball team represented Middle Tennessee State University during the 2023–24 NCAA Division I men's basketball season. The team was led by sixth-year head coach Nick McDevitt and played their home games at Murphy Center in Murfreesboro, Tennessee as members of Conference USA (C-USA). They finished the season 14–19, 7–9 in C-USA play, to finish in a four-way tie for fourth place.

== Previous season ==
The Blue Raiders finished the 2022–23 season 19–14, 11–9 in C-USA play, to finish in fourth place. They defeated Charlotte in quarterfinals of the C-USA tournament before losing to Florida Atlantic in the semifinals.

== Offseason ==
=== Departures ===
Name	Number	Pos.	Height	Weight	Year	Hometown	Reason for departure
Tyler Millin	1	F	6' 7"	205	Junior	Calera, AL	Transferred to Chattanooga
DeAndre Dishman	2	F	6' 6"	235	RS Senior	Lexington, KY	Graduated
Eli Lawrence	5	G	6' 5"	185	Junior	Atlanta, GA	Transferred to Texas A&M
Teafale Lenard Jr.	12	G	6' 7"	175	Sophomore	Snyder, TX	Transferred to Memphis
TreVon Smith	13	G	6' 3"	175	Junior	Campbellsville, KY	Transferred to Tusculum
Christian Fussell	15	F	6' 10"	220	RS Sophomore	Decatur, GA	Transferred to UT Martin

=== Incoming transfers ===
Name	Number	Pos.	Height	Weight	Year	Hometown	Previous school
Tyronn Mosley	1	G/F	6' 6"	210	Senior	Chicago, IL	Mississippi Valley State
Jacob Johnson	15	G	6' 5"	195	RS Junior	Minneapolis, MN	LIU
Josh Ogundele	23	C	6' 10"	275	Junior	London, England	Iowa

=== 2023 recruiting class ===
College recruiting information
Name	Hometown	School	Height	Weight	Commit date
Torey Alston; PF	Winston-Salem, NC	Winston Salem Christian School	6 ft 8 in (2.03 m)	N/A	Apr 30, 2023
Torey Alston; PF	Recruit ratings: Scout: Rivals: 247Sports: (NR)				
Chris Loofe; C	Leander, TX	Link Year Prep	6 ft 11 in (2.11 m)	N/A	Apr 15, 2023
Chris Loofe; C	Recruit ratings: Scout: Rivals: 247Sports: (NR)				
Overall recruit ranking:
Note: In many cases, Scout, Rivals, 247Sports, On3, and ESPN may conflict in their listings of height and weight.; In these cases, the average was taken. ESPN grades are on a 100-point scale.; Sources: "2023 Team Ranking". Rivals.

== Roster ==
2023–24 Middle Tennessee Blue Raiders men's basketball team
Players
Coaches

Pos.	#	Name	Height	Weight	Year	Previous school	Hometown
G	0	Isiah Lightsy (W)	6 ft 4 in (1.93 m)	185 lb (84 kg)	Jr	Siegel; Chattanooga State	Murfreesboro, TN
G	1	Ty Mosley	6 ft 5 in (1.96 m)	190 lb (86 kg)	Sr	Orr; Mississippi Valley State	Chicago, IL
F	2	Torey Alston	6 ft 8 in (2.03 m)	190 lb (86 kg)	Fr	Winston Salem Christian School	Winston-Salem, NC
G	3	Jestin Porter	6 ft 1 in (1.85 m)	180 lb (82 kg)	Jr	Cypress Ridge HS; Tyler JC	Houston, TX
G	4	Justin Bufford	6 ft 6 in (1.98 m)	190 lb (86 kg)	Jr	Montgomery Catholic; Shelton State CC	Selma, AL
F	10	Elias King	6 ft 8 in (2.03 m)	215 lb (98 kg)	Sr	Lincoln Academy; Mississippi State	Atlanta, GA
G	11	Tre Green	6 ft 3 in (1.91 m)	190 lb (86 kg)	So	Glenelg Country School	Baltimore, MD
F	13	Chris Loofe	6 ft 11 in (2.11 m)	220 lb (100 kg)	Fr	Link Year Prep (MO)	Leander, TX
G	14	Jalen Jordan	6 ft 2 in (1.88 m)	170 lb (77 kg)	RS Sr	Rockdale County HS; St. Francis Brooklyn	Conyers, GA
G	15	Jacob Johnson	6 ft 5 in (1.96 m)	195 lb (88 kg)	RS Jr	Champlin Park; LIU	Minneapolis, MN
C	23	Josh Ogundele	6 ft 11 in (2.11 m)	300 lb (136 kg)	Jr	Worcester Academy; Iowa	London, England
G	24	Camryn Weston	6 ft 3 in (1.91 m)	190 lb (86 kg)	Sr	Westover HS; Southeastern CC	Albany, GA
F	31	Jared Coleman-Jones	6 ft 10 in (2.08 m)	240 lb (109 kg)	Jr	McEarhern HS; Northwestern	Hiram, GA
G	55	Jack Jubenville (W)	6 ft 0 in (1.83 m)	170 lb (77 kg)	RS So	Middle Tennessee Christian	Murfreesboro, TN

Head coach

- Nick McDevitt (UNC Asheville)

Assistant coach(es)

- Wes Long (Clemson)
- Logan Johnson (Coastal Carolina)
- Eric Wilson (Western Carolina)

Legend

- (C) Team captain
- (S) Suspended
- (I) Ineligible
- (W) Walk-on
- Injured
- Current redshirt

Roster
Last update: October 31, 2024

== Schedule and results ==
Date time, TV	Rank^{#}	Opponent^{#}	Result	Record	High points	High rebounds	High assists	Site (attendance) city, state
Non-conference regular season
November 6, 2023*; 7:30 p.m., ESPN+		Northern Kentucky	W 74–57	1–0	14 – tied	6 – Coleman-Jones	5 – Weston	Murphy Center (3,505); Murfreesboro, TN
November 9, 2023*; 6:30 p.m., ESPN+		Stephen F. Austin; C-USA/WAC Alliance	W 67–62 ^{OT}	2–0	14 – King	9 – Coleman-Jones	2 – Weston	Murphy Center (3,411); Murfreesboro, TN
November 13, 2023*; 6:30 p.m., ESPN+		Western Carolina	L 64–66	2–1	14 – King	9 – Porter	2 – Coleman-Jones	Murphy Center (2,806); Murfreesboro, TN
November 18, 2023*; 5:00 p.m., ESPN+		Milligan	W 88–62	3–1	19 – King	9 – Coleman-Jones	4 – tied	Murphy Center (3,000); Murfreesboro, TN
November 21, 2023*; 6:30 p.m., ESPN+		UAB	L 57–58	3–2	12 – Ogundele	8 – King	3 – tied	Murphy Center (3,227); Murfreesboro, TN
November 24, 2023*; 3:30 p.m., FloSports		vs. UIC; Nassau Championship quarterfinals	L 40–70	3–3	9 – tied	8 – King	1 – tied	Baha Mar Convention Center (213); Nassau, Bahamas
November 25, 2023*; 12:30 p.m., FloSports		vs. Ohio; Nassau Championship consolation 2nd round	L 68–80	3–4	17 – Coleman-Jones	8 – Coleman-Jones	4 – Porter	Baha Mar Convention Center (241); Nassau, Bahamas
November 26, 2023*; 11:00 a.m., FloSports		vs. Kansas City; Nassau Championship 7th-place game	W 63–59	4–4	21 – Jordan	6 – Coleman-Jones	4 – Coleman-Jones	Baha Mar Convention Center (234); Nassau, Bahamas
December 2, 2023*; 6:30 p.m., ESPN+		Wofford	L 64–74 ^{OT}	4–5	15 – Porter	11 – Coleman-Jones	4 – Bufford	Murphy Center (2,510); Murfreesboro, TN
December 5, 2023*; 6:30 p.m., ESPN+		Missouri State	W 77–73 ^{OT}	5–5	22 – King	9 – Coleman-Jones	3 – Coleman-Jones	Murphy Center (2,605); Murfreesboro, TN
December 9, 2023*; 7:30 p.m., CBSSN		Belmont	L 65–75	5–6	27 – King	7 – Coleman-Jones	4 – Johnson	Murphy Center (2,605); Murfreesboro, TN
December 19, 2023*; 9:00 p.m., ESPN+		at Saint Mary's	L 34–71	5–7	9 – Johnson	4 – Jackson	2 – King	University Credit Union Pavilion (2,931); Moraga, CA
December 22, 2023*; 7:30 p.m., ESPN+		at Southern Utah; C-USA/WAC Alliance	L 63–69	5–8	26 – Porter	9 – tied	3 – tied	America First Event Center (1,335); Cedar City, UT
December 30, 2023*; 3:00 p.m., ESPN+		at Murray State	L 54–75	5–9	16 – King	7 – Loofe	3 – Porter	CFSB Center (5,303); Murray, KY
January 3, 2024*; 6:30 p.m., ESPN+		Reinhardt	W 84–47	6–9	15 – Jordan	9 – Loofe	5 – Jordan	Murphy Center (2,501); Murfreesboro, TN
Conference USA regular season
January 11, 2024; 8:00 p.m., ESPN+		Louisiana Tech	L 52–60	6–10 (0–1)	24 – Porter	10 – Coleman-Jones	2 – Porter	Murphy Center (2,505); Murfreesboro, TN
January 13, 2024; 5:00 p.m., ESPN+		Sam Houston	L 51–60	6–11 (0–2)	29 – Porter	7 – Coleman-Jones	2 – Green	Murphy Center (3,227); Murfreesboro, TN
January 18, 2024; 8:00 p.m., CBSSN		at UTEP	L 59–73	6–12 (0–3)	16 – Coleman-Jones	11 – Coleman-Jones	6 – Coleman-Jones	Don Haskins Center; El Paso, TX
January 20, 2024; 8:00 p.m., ESPN+		at New Mexico State	L 62–73	6–13 (0–4)	18 – Green	10 – Coleman-Jones	4 – Coleman-Jones	Pan American Center; Las Cruces, NM
January 24, 2024; 6:30 p.m., ESPN+		Jacksonville State	W 75–67	7–13 (1–4)	30 – Porter	8 – Coleman-Jones	5 – Coleman-Jones	Murphy Center; Murfreesboro, TN
January 27, 2024; 5:00 p.m., ESPN+		FIU	W 79–61	8–13 (2–4)	23 – King	9 – Coleman-Jones	4 – Porter	Murphy Center; Murfreesboro, TN
February 3, 2024; 7:00 p.m., ESPNU		at Western Kentucky	L 65–88	8–14 (2–5)	22 – Jordan	9 – Coleman-Jones	4 – Porter	E. A. Diddle Arena; Bowling Green, KY
February 8, 2024; 6:00 p.m., ESPN+		at Liberty	L 53–88	8–15 (2–6)	19 – King	5 – tied	2 – Bufford	Liberty Arena (3,241); Lynchburg, VA
February 10, 2024; 1:00 p.m., ESPN+		at FIU	W 68–66	9–15 (3–6)	18 – King	13 – Coleman-Jones	2 – Porter	Ocean Bank Convocation Center (638); Miami, FL
February 15, 2024; 6:30 p.m., ESPN+		New Mexico State	W 76–69	10–15 (4–6)	26 – Porter	9 – Coleman-Jones	4 – Porter	Murphy Center (2,890); Murfreesboro, TN
February 17, 2024; 5:00 p.m., ESPN+		UTEP	W 96–90 ^{2OT}	11–15 (5–6)	41 – Porter	13 – Coleman-Jones	8 – Coleman-Jones	Murphy Center (2,952); Murfreesboro, TN
February 21, 2024; 6:00 p.m., ESPN+		at Jacksonville State	L 68–76	11–16 (5–7)	19 – Coleman-Jones	7 – tied	5 – King	Pete Mathews Coliseum (2,167); Jacksonville, AL
February 24, 2024; 6:30 p.m., ESPN+		Western Kentucky	W 74–72	12–16 (6–7)	20 – Coleman-Jones	11 – tied	4 – Coleman-Jones	Murphy Center (5,038); Murfreesboro, TN
March 2, 2024; 7:00 p.m., ESPNU		at Sam Houston	L 64–81	12–17 (6–8)	18 – Coleman-Jones	5 – tied	4 – Coleman-Jones	Bernard Johnson Coliseum (2,423); Huntsville, TX
March 5, 2024; 6:00 p.m., ESPN+		Liberty	W 69–61	13–17 (7–8)	19 – King	10 – Coleman-Jones	4 – Johnson	Murphy Center (2,806); Murfreesboro, TN
March 9, 2024; 2:00 p.m., ESPN+		at Louisiana Tech	L 70–84	13–18 (7–9)	19 – King	11 – King	2 – tied	Thomas Assembly Center (2,636); Ruston, LA
Conference USA tournament
March 13, 2024; 8:00 p.m., ESPN+	(7)	vs. (2) Louisiana Tech; Quarterfinals	W 70–67	14–18	18 – Porter	10 – Coleman-Jones	4 – Coleman-Jones	Von Braun Center (678); Huntsville, AL
March 15, 2024; 2:00 p.m., CBSSN	(7)	vs. (3) Western Kentucky; Semifinals	L 54–85	14–19	14 – Porter	7 – Coleman-Jones	2 – tied	Von Braun Center (3,272); Huntsville, AL
*Non-conference game. ^{#}Rankings from AP poll. (#) Tournament seedings in parentheses. All times are in Central.

== See also ==
- 2023–24 Middle Tennessee Blue Raiders women's basketball team
