= 2023–24 FIU Panthers men's basketball team =

American college basketball season

2023–24 FIU Panthers men's basketball
- Conference: Conference USA
- Record: 11–22 (5–11 C-USA)
- Head coach: Jeremy Ballard (6th season)
- Associate head coach: Jesse Bopp
- Assistant coaches: Joey Rodriguez; Zavier Anderson
- Home arena: Ocean Bank Convocation Center

2023–24 Conference USA men's basketball standings
	Conf.				Overall
Team	W		L	PCT	W		L	PCT
Sam Houston	13	–	3	.813	21	–	12	.636
Louisiana Tech	12	–	4	.750	22	–	10	.688
Western Kentucky †	8	–	8	.500	22	–	12	.647
Liberty	7	–	9	.438	18	–	14	.563
UTEP	7	–	9	.438	18	–	16	.529
New Mexico State	7	–	9	.438	13	–	19	.406
Middle Tennessee	7	–	9	.438	14	–	19	.424
Jacksonville State	6	–	10	.375	14	–	18	.438
FIU	5	–	11	.313	11	–	22	.333
† 2024 CUSA tournament winner

The 2023–24 FIU Panthers men's basketball team represented Florida International University in the 2023–24 NCAA Division I men's basketball season. The Panthers, led by sixth-year head coach Jeremy Ballard, played their home games at Ocean Bank Convocation Center in Miami, Florida as members of Conference USA.

== Previous season ==
The Panthers finished the 2022–23 season 14–18, 8–12 in C-USA play to finish in a 3-way tie for sixth place. As a No. 7 seed, they lost in the first round of the C-USA tournament to Louisiana Tech.

== Offseason ==
=== Departures ===
Name	Number	Pos.	Height	Weight	Year	Hometown	Reason for departure
Nick Guadarrama	0	F	6'5"	250	GS Senior	Newington, CT	Graduated
Denver Jones	2	G	6'4"	195	Sophomore	New Market, AL	Transferred to Auburn
Darryon Prescott	15	C	7'0"	216	Freshman	Philadelphia, PA	Transferred to Coppin State
Austin Williams	20	G	6'4"	200	GS Senior	Roseland, NJ	Graduate transferred to Rutgers
John Williams Jr.	21	G	6'4"	190	GS Senior	Augusta, GA	Graduated
Cameron Wilson	25	G	6'0"	160	Sophomore	Conyers, GA	Walk-on; transferred to Palm Beach State College

=== Incoming transfers ===
Name	Number	Pos.	Height	Weight	Year	Hometown	Previous School
Okechukwu Okeke	0	F/C	6'9"	230	Junior	East Chicago, IN	Tallahassee CC
Jaidon Lipscomb	5	G	6'5"	176	Junior	Columbus, OH	Lakeland CC
Travis Gray	10	G	6'7"	190	Junior	Syracuse, NY	Mohawk Valley CC
Jonathan Aybar	21	F	6'9"	205	Junior	Kissimmee, FL	North Florida
George Pridgett	31	G	5'11"		Junior	Boston, MA	Polk State College

=== 2023 recruiting class ===
There were no incoming recruits for the class of 2023.

== Roster ==
2023–24 FIU Panthers men's basketball team
Players
Coaches

Pos.	#	Name	Height	Weight	Year	Previous school	Hometown
F	0	Chris Okeke	6 ft 9 in (2.06 m)	225 lb (102 kg)	Jr	Lipscomb; Tallahassee CC	East Chicago, Indiana
G	1	Dashon Gittens	6 ft 3 in (1.91 m)	178 lb (81 kg)	So	Putnam Science Academy	Hartford, Connecticut
G	2	Arturo Dean	5 ft 11 in (1.8 m)	163 lb (74 kg)	So	Putnam Science Academy	Miami, Florida
G	3	Javaunte Hawkins	5 ft 11 in (1.8 m)	160 lb (73 kg)	Sr	Lee's Summit North HS; Butler CC	Lee's Summit, Missouri
C	4	Seth Pinkney	7 ft 1 in (2.16 m)	200 lb (91 kg)	Sr	Montverde Academy; Quinnipiac	Warminster, Pennsylvania
G	5	Jaidon Lipscomb	6 ft 5 in (1.96 m)	175 lb (79 kg)	Jr	Dohn Community High School; Lakeland CC	Columbus, Ohio
G	10	Travis Gray	6 ft 7 in (2.01 m)	180 lb (82 kg)	Jr	Henninger HS; Mohawk Valley CC	Syracuse, New York
G	11	Jayden Brewer	6 ft 6 in (1.98 m)	155 lb (70 kg)	So	Combine Academy	Indianapolis, Indiana
G/F	12	Dante Wilcox	6 ft 6 in (1.98 m)	220 lb (100 kg)	RS Jr	Oxbridge Academy	West Palm Beach, Florida
G	15	Renato Ruiz (W)	6 ft 1 in (1.85 m)	180 lb (82 kg)	Jr	American Heritage HS	Plantation, Florida
F	21	Jonathan Aybar	6 ft 9 in (2.06 m)	205 lb (93 kg)	Jr	Central Pointe Christian Academy; North Florida	Kissimmee, Florida
G	22	Onyx Pastoriza (W)	5 ft 8 in (1.73 m)	—	Sr	Miami Triple Threat Prep	Arecibo, Puerto Rico
G	23	Petar Krivokapic	6 ft 4 in (1.93 m)	214 lb (97 kg)	Jr	Miami Prep School	Budva, Montenegro
G	24	Jaden Grant (W)	5 ft 11 in (1.8 m)	161 lb (73 kg)	Jr	NSU University School	Davie, Florida
G	31	George Pridgett Jr.	5 ft 10 in (1.78 m)	160 lb (73 kg)	Jr	Roswell HS; Polk State College	Boston, Massachusetts
F	33	Mohamed Sanogo	6 ft 9 in (2.06 m)	200 lb (91 kg)	Jr	Putnam Science Academy	Pittsfield, Massachusetts

Head coach

- Jeremy Ballard (Colgate)

Assistant coach(es)

- Jesse Bopp (Plymouth State)
- Joey Rodriguez (VCU)
- Zavier Anderson (Clemson)

Legend

- (C) Team captain
- (S) Suspended
- (I) Ineligible
- (W) Walk-on
- Injured
- Current redshirt

Roster

== Schedule and results ==
Date time, TV	Rank^{#}	Opponent^{#}	Result	Record	High points	High rebounds	High assists	Site (attendance) city, state
Non-conference regular season
November 6, 2023*; 8:00 p.m., ESPN+		at UCF	L 62–85	0–1	11 – Gittens	6 – Brewer	4 – Dean	Addition Financial Arena (6,225); Orlando, FL
November 9, 2023*; 7:00 p.m., ESPN+		Tarleton State; C-USA/WAC Alliance	L 65–82	0–2	14 – Tied	5 – Aybar	4 – Tied	Ocean Bank Convocation Center (1,242); Miami, FL
November 13, 2023*; 7:00 p.m., ACCNX/ESPN+		at No. 12 Miami (FL)	L 80–86	0–3	19 – Dean	6 – Tied	6 – Dean	Watsco Center (6,620); Coral Gables, FL
November 15, 2023*; 8:00 p.m., ESPN+		at Houston Christian	W 83–74	1–3	20 – Gittens	8 – Tied	6 – Tied	Sharp Gymnasium (609); Houston, TX
November 19, 2023*; 7:30 p.m., FloSports		vs. Akron; Cayman Islands Classic quarterfinals	L 71–77	1–4	26 – Krivokapic	4 – Hawkins	9 – Dean	John Gray Gymnasium; George Town, Cayman Islands
November 20, 2023*; 5:00 p.m., FloSports		vs. Marshall; Cayman Islands Classic consolation 2nd round	L 69–80	1–5	13 – Aybar	6 – Dean	4 – Dean	John Gray Gymnasium; George Town, Cayman Islands
November 21, 2023*; 11:00 a.m., FloSports		vs. Loyola Marymount; Cayman Islands Classic 7th place game	L 60–61	1–6	19 – Gittens	5 – Pinkney	4 – Dean	John Gray Gymnasium; George Town, Cayman Islands
November 26, 2023*; 6:00 p.m., ESPN+		Kennesaw State	W 91–84	2–6	22 – Hawkins	7 – Dean	5 – Dean	Ocean Bank Convocation Center (755); Miami, FL
November 29, 2023*; 7:00 p.m., CBSSN		Florida Gulf Coast	L 65–68	2–7	18 – Brewer	7 – Dean	4 – Tied	Ocean Bank Convocation Center (1,365); Miami, FL
December 2, 2023*; 6:00 p.m., ESPN+		LIU	W 74–59	3–7	27 – Dean	7 – Dean	5 – Hawkins	Ocean Bank Convocation Center (681); Miami, FL
December 13, 2023*; 7:00 p.m., ESPN+		at No. 15 Florida Atlantic	L 60–94	3–8	17 – Lipscomb	5 – Tied	4 – Dean	Eleanor R. Baldwin Arena (3,161); Boca Raton, FL
December 16, 2023*; 6:00 p.m., ESPN+		Trinity College	W 146–55	4–8	23 – Lipscomb	10 – Okeke	7 – Dean	Ocean Bank Convocation Center (586); Miami, FL
December 19, 2023*; 7:00 p.m., ESPN+		Stetson	L 68–80	4–9	17 – Hawkins	6 – Tied	5 – Dean	Ocean Bank Convocation Center (709); Miami, FL
December 21, 2023*; 7:00 p.m., ESPN+		Maine	W 82–74	5–9	20 – Hawkins	8 – Brewer	7 – Gittens	Ocean Bank Convocation Center (602); Miami, FL
December 30, 2023*; 5:00 p.m., ESPN+		at Utah Tech; C-USA/WAC Alliance	L 92–96 ^{OT}	5–10	27 – Hawkins	5 – Tied	4 – Hawkins	Burns Arena (1,213); St. George, UT
Conference USA regular season
January 6, 2024; 5:00 p.m., ESPN+		at Jacksonville State	L 63–70	5–11 (0–1)	15 – Hawkins	5 – Tied	5 – Dean	Pete Mathews Coliseum (2,188); Jacksonville, AL
January 11, 2024; 7:00 p.m., ESPN+		New Mexico State	W 77-67	6-11 (1-1)	20 – Hawkins	6 – Dean	5 – Dean	Ocean Bank Convocation Center (1,294); Miami, FL
January 13, 2024; 6:00 p.m., ESPN+		UTEP	W 72–68	7–11 (2–1)	20 – Hawkins	6 – Sanogo	5 – Lipscomb	Ocean Bank Convocation Center (1,021); Miami, FL
January 18, 2024; 7:00 p.m., ESPN+		at Liberty	L 69–78	7–12 (2–2)	24 – Hawkins	7 – Dean	3 – Dean	Liberty Arena (3,247); Lynchburg, VA
January 25, 2024; 8:00 p.m., ESPN+		at Western Kentucky	L 91–105	7–13 (2–3)	17 – Krivokapic	4 – Pinkney	5 – Dean	E. A. Diddle Arena (4,144); Bowling Green, KY
January 27, 2024; 6:00 p.m., ESPN+		at Middle Tennessee	L 61–79	7–14 (2–4)	16 – Dean	6 – Pinkney	5 – Dean	Murphy Center (4,122); Murfreesboro, TN
February 1, 2024; 7:00 p.m., ESPN+		Louisiana Tech	L 53–93	7–15 (2–5)	18 – Brewer	4 – Gittens	2 – Tied	Ocean Bank Convocation Center (1,115); Miami, FL
February 3, 2024; 2:00 p.m., ESPN+		Sam Houston	W 68–61	8–15 (3–5)	18 – Krivokapic	7 – Brewer	9 – Hawkins	Ocean Bank Convocation Center (1,179); Miami, FL
February 10, 2024; 2:00 p.m., ESPN+		Middle Tennessee	L 66–68	8–16 (3–6)	14 – Dean	8 – Dean	4 – Hawkins	Ocean Bank Convocation Center (638); Miami, FL
February 15, 2024; 7:30 p.m., ESPN+		at Sam Houston	L 56–70	8–17 (3–7)	15 – Brewer	7 – Pinkney	4 – Tied	Bernard Johnson Coliseum (1,395); Huntsville, TX
February 17, 2024; 3:00 p.m., ESPN+		at Louisiana Tech	L 68–75	8–18 (3–8)	19 – Dean	12 – Dean	4 – Hawkins	Thomas Assembly Center (2,273); Ruston, LA
February 22, 2024; 7:00 p.m., ESPN+		Liberty	W 76–71	9–18 (4–8)	24 – Dean	6 – Hawkins	5 – Hawkins	Ocean Bank Convocation Center (1,008); Miami, FL
February 24, 2024; 6:00 p.m., ESPN+		Jacksonville State	L 75–77	9–19 (4–9)	19 – Dean	7 – Dean	4 – Hawkins	Ocean Bank Convocation Center (828); Miami, FL
March 2, 2024; 6:00 p.m., ESPN+		Western Kentucky	W 85–83	10–19 (5–9)	27 – Hawkins	9 – Brewer	5 – Hawkins	Ocean Bank Convocation Center (990); Miami, FL
March 7, 2024; 9:00 p.m., ESPN+		at UTEP	L 76–83	10–20 (5–10)	23 – Brewer	5 – Wilcox	4 – Dean	Don Haskins Center (5,151); El Paso, TX
March 9, 2024; 4:00 p.m., ESPN+		at New Mexico State	L 70–77	10–21 (5–11)	16 – Brewer	6 – Dean	5 – Dean	Pan American Center (4,864); Las Cruces, NM
Conference USA tournament
March 12, 2024; 9:00 p.m., ESPN+	(9)	vs. (8) Jacksonville State; First Round	W 76–67	11–21	21 – Dean	6 – Tied	6 – Dean	Von Braun Center (444); Huntsville, AL
March 13, 2024; 6:30 p.m., ESPN+	(9)	vs. (1) Sam Houston; Quarterfinals	L 59–78	11–22	20 – Hawkins	8 – Dean	2 – Tied	Von Braun Center (628); Huntsville, AL
*Non-conference game. ^{#}Rankings from AP Poll. (#) Tournament seedings in parentheses. All times are in Eastern.
