= 2023–24 UTEP Miners men's basketball team =

American college basketball season

2023–24 UTEP Miners men's basketball

Sun Bowl Invitational Champions
- Conference: Conference USA
- Record: 18–16 (7–9 C-USA)
- Head coach: Joe Golding (3rd season)
- Associate head coach: Jeremy Cox
- Assistant coaches: Earl Boykins; Bryen Spriggs
- Home arena: Don Haskins Center

2023–24 Conference USA men's basketball standings
	Conf.				Overall
Team	W		L	PCT	W		L	PCT
Sam Houston	13	–	3	.813	21	–	12	.636
Louisiana Tech	12	–	4	.750	22	–	10	.688
Western Kentucky †	8	–	8	.500	22	–	12	.647
Liberty	7	–	9	.438	18	–	14	.563
UTEP	7	–	9	.438	18	–	16	.529
New Mexico State	7	–	9	.438	13	–	19	.406
Middle Tennessee	7	–	9	.438	14	–	19	.424
Jacksonville State	6	–	10	.375	14	–	18	.438
FIU	5	–	11	.313	11	–	22	.333
† 2024 CUSA tournament winner

The 2023–24 UTEP Miners men's basketball team represented the University of Texas at El Paso during the 2023–24 NCAA Division I men's basketball season. The team, led by third-year head coach Joe Golding, played their home games at the Don Haskins Center in El Paso, Texas as a member of Conference USA.

== Previous season ==
The Miners finished the 2022–23 season 14–18, 7–13 in C-USA play to finish in a tie for ninth place. They lost in the first round of the C-USA tournament to Western Kentucky.

== Offseason ==
=== Departures ===
Name	Number	Pos.	Height	Weight	Year	Hometown	Reason for departure
Jamal Sumlin	0	G	6'3"	180	Freshman	Cleveland, OH	Transferred to Northwest Florida State College
Malik Zachery	3	G	6'2"	180	Junior	Syracuse, NY	Transferred
Mario McKinney Jr.	4	G	6'1"	185	Junior	St. Louis, MI	Left the team for personal reasons
Shamar Givance	5	G	5'10"	170	Senior	Toronto, ON	Graduated
Carlos Lemus	11	G	6'3"	190	Sophomore	Cumaná, Venezuela	Left the team for personal reasons
Jamari Sibley	12	F	6'8"	185	Sophomore	Milwaukee, WI	Transferred to Southern Utah
Ze'Rik Onyema	21	F	6'8"	230	Sophomore	San Antonio, TX	Transferred to Texas
Milos Merrick	24	G	6'4"	210	Freshman	Wheeling, WV	Walk-on; left the team for personal reasons

=== Incoming transfers ===
Name	Number	Pos.	Height	Weight	Year	Hometown	Previous School
Yadiz Powell	0	G	6'4"	195	Senior	Philadelphia, PA	Buffalo
Baylor Hebb	3	G	6'2"	180	Junior	Colleyville, TX	Colorado State
Corey Camper Jr.	4	G	6'5"		Junior	Little Rock, AR	Tyler Junior College
Sebastian Cole	21	G	5'11"		Junior	Aurora, CO	Walk-on; Otero College
Elijah Jones	33	F	6'8"	210	RS Freshman	Pleasantville, NJ	East Carolina

=== Recruiting classes ===
==== 2023 recruiting class ====
College recruiting information
Name	Hometown	School	Height	Weight	Commit date
David Terrell; SG	Arlington, TX	Mansfield Summit High School	6 ft 4 in (1.93 m)	180 lb (82 kg)	Sep 20, 2022
David Terrell; SG	Recruit ratings: Scout: Rivals: 247Sports: ESPN:				
Trey Horton; SG	Charlotte, NC	Providence Day School	6 ft 5 in (1.96 m)	200 lb (91 kg)	Sep 26, 2022
Trey Horton; SG	Recruit ratings: Scout: Rivals: 247Sports: ESPN:				
Overall recruit ranking:
Note: In many cases, Scout, Rivals, 247Sports, On3, and ESPN may conflict in their listings of height and weight.; In these cases, the average was taken. ESPN grades are on a 100-point scale.; Sources: "2023 Team Ranking". Rivals.

==== 2024 recruiting class ====
College recruiting information (2024)
Name	Hometown	School	Height	Weight	Commit date
KJ Thomas; PG	Canyon, TX	Randall High School	6 ft 1 in (1.85 m)	165 lb (75 kg)	Sep 22, 2023
KJ Thomas; PG	Recruit ratings: Scout: Rivals: 247Sports: ESPN:				
Overall recruit ranking:
Note: In many cases, Scout, Rivals, 247Sports, On3, and ESPN may conflict in their listings of height and weight.; In these cases, the average was taken. ESPN grades are on a 100-point scale.; Sources: "2024 Team Ranking". Rivals.

== Roster ==
2023–24 UTEP Miners men's basketball team
Players
Coaches

Pos.	#	Name	Height	Weight	Year	Previous school	Hometown
G	0	Zid Powell	6 ft 4 in (1.93 m)	204 lb (93 kg)	Sr	Buffalo	Philadelphia, Pennsylvania
F	1	Jon Don Anjos	6 ft 8 in (2.03 m)	205 lb (93 kg)	RS Sr	Florida SouthWestern State College	Curitiba, Brazil
G	2	Tae Hardy	6 ft 3 in (1.91 m)	190 lb (86 kg)	Sr	Southern Miss	Ellenwood, Georgia
G	3	Baylor Hebb	6 ft 2 in (1.88 m)	185 lb (84 kg)	Jr	Colorado State	Colleyville, Texas
G	4	Corey Camper Jr.	6 ft 5 in (1.96 m)	185 lb (84 kg)	Jr	Tyler Junior College	Little Rock, Arkansas
G	5	David Terrell Jr.	6 ft 4 in (1.93 m)	190 lb (86 kg)	Fr	Mansfield Summit	Dallas, Texas
G	11	Trey Horton	6 ft 5 in (1.96 m)	208 lb (94 kg)	Fr	Providence Day School	Charlotte, North Carolina
F	13	Calvin Solomon	6 ft 7 in (2.01 m)	205 lb (93 kg)	Sr	Stephen F. Austin	Houston, Texas
G	15	Antwonne Holmes (W)	6 ft 3 in (1.91 m)	170 lb (77 kg)	So	Chapin	El Paso, Texas
G	20	Garrett Levesque (W)	6 ft 6 in (1.98 m)	205 lb (93 kg)	Jr	Tarleton State	El Paso, Texas
G	21	Sebastian Cole (W)	6 ft 1 in (1.85 m)	170 lb (77 kg)	Jr	Otero College	Aurora, Colorado
F	23	Otis Frazier III	6 ft 6 in (1.98 m)	212 lb (96 kg)	Jr	George Mason	Buckeye, Arizona
F	32	Derick Hamilton	6 ft 10 in (2.08 m)	270 lb (122 kg)	Jr	Bossier Parish CC	Baton Rouge, Louisiana
F	33	Elijah Jones	6 ft 8 in (2.03 m)	205 lb (93 kg)	RS Fr	East Carolina	Pleasantville, New Jersey
F	34	Kevin Kalu	6 ft 9 in (2.06 m)	238 lb (108 kg)	Jr	Our Lady of Mount Carmel School	Baltimore, Maryland

Head coach

- Joe Golding (Abilene Christian)

Assistant coach(es)

- Jeremy Cox (Colorado Mesa)
- Earl Boykins (Eastern Michigan)
- Bryen Spriggs (Slippery Rock)

Legend

- (C) Team captain
- (S) Suspended
- (I) Ineligible
- (W) Walk-on
- Injured
- Current redshirt

Roster

== Schedule and results ==
Date time, TV	Rank^{#}	Opponent^{#}	Result	Record	High points	High rebounds	High assists	Site (attendance) city, state
Regular season
November 6, 2023*; 7:00 p.m., ESPN+		McMurry	W 120–71	1–0	19 – Jones	8 – Dos Anjos	10 – Hardy	Don Haskins Center (3,782); El Paso, TX
November 9, 2023*; 7:00 p.m., ESPN+		USAO	W 123–72	2–0	19 – Jones	13 – Kalu	6 – Terrell Jr.	Don Haskins Center (3,514); El Paso, TX
November 13, 2023*; 7:00 p.m., CBSSN		UC Santa Barbara	W 89–76	3–0	23 – Powell	13 – Solomon	8 – Hardy	Don Haskins Center (7,121); El Paso, TX
November 17, 2023*; 7:00 p.m., ESPN+		Austin Peay; SoCal Challenge campus site game	W 71–63	4–0	25 – Hardy	9 – Frazier	7 – Solomon	Don Haskins Center (4,871); El Paso, TX
November 20, 2023*; 11:00 p.m., CBSSN		vs. California; SoCal Challenge Surf Division semifinals	W 75–72	5–0	16 – Hardy	6 – Powell	3 – Tied	The Pavilion at JSerra (529); San Juan Capistrano, CA
November 22, 2023*; 8:30 p.m., CBSSN		vs. Bradley; SoCal Challenge Surf Division championship	L 59–63	5–1	15 – Hardy	7 – Kalu	4 – Solomon	The Pavilion at JSerra (499); San Juan Capistrano, CA
November 25, 2023*; 5:00 p.m., ESPN+		at Loyola Marymount	L 47–67	5–2	12 – Hardy	7 – Kalu	2 – Tied	Gersten Pavilion (750); Los Angeles, CA
November 29, 2023*; 7:00 p.m., ESPN+		Texas A&M–Corpus Christi	L 63–67	5–3	16 – Frazier	8 – Powell	4 – Tied	Don Haskins Center (4,671); El Paso, TX
December 4, 2023*; 7:00 p.m., ESPN+		Western New Mexico	W 90–62	6–3	14 – Powell	10 – Frazier III	4 – Hardy	Don Haskins Center (3,656); El Paso, TX
December 9, 2023*; 7:00 p.m., P12N		at Oregon	L 49–71	6–4	16 – Hardy	6 – Frazier III	3 – Powell	Matthew Knight Arena (5,084); Eugene, OR
December 17, 2023*; 2:00 p.m., ESPN+		at Abilene Christian; C-USA/WAC Alliance	L 82–88	6–5	22 – Hardy	7 – Powell	5 – Camper Jr.	Moody Coliseum (1,469); Abilene, TX
December 20, 2023*; 7:30 p.m., YouTube/4.2 (Local TV)		Norfolk State; Sun Bowl Invitational semifinals	W 67–65	7–5	13 – Solomon	8 – Solomon	3 – Powell	Don Haskins Center (4,193); El Paso, TX
December 21, 2023*; 7:00 p.m., YouTube/4.2 (Local TV)		Wyoming; Sun Bowl Invitational championship	W 78–67	8–5	32 – Powell	6 – Tied	4 – Powell	Don Haskins Center (4,310); El Paso, TX
December 30, 2023*; 7:00 p.m., ESPN+		Seattle; C-USA/WAC Alliance	L 61–73	8–6	9 – Terrell Jr.	7 – Powell	2 – Powell	Don Haskins Center (4,391); El Paso, TX
Conference USA regular season
January 4, 2024; 7:00 p.m., CBSSN		at New Mexico State; Battle of I-10	L 53–63	8–7 (0–1)	21 – Hardy	7 – Kalu	3 – Powell	Pan American Center (5,216); Las Cruces, NM
January 7, 2024*; 1:00 p.m., ESPN+		Chicago State	W 74–69	9–7	13 – Hardy	5 – Soloman	3 – Tied	Don Haskins Center (3,632); El Paso, TX
January 13, 2024; 4:00 p.m., ESPN+		at FIU	L 68–72	9–8 (0–2)	15 – Hardy	6 – Frazier III	4 – Camper Jr.	Ocean Bank Convocation Center (1,021); Miami, FL
January 18, 2024; 7:00 p.m., CBSSN		Middle Tennessee	W 73–59	10–8 (1–2)	21 – Frazier	5 – Solomon	2 – Tied	Don Haskins Center (3,833); El Paso, TX
January 20, 2024; 7:00 p.m., ESPN+		Western Kentucky	W 93–87	11–8 (2–2)	27 – Hardy	9 – Frazier	6 – Frazier	Don Haskins Center (4,151); El Paso, TX
January 25, 2024; 5:00 p.m., ESPN+		at Louisiana Tech	L 54–68	11–9 (2–3)	11 – Tied	6 – Powell	5 – Terrell	Thomas Assembly Center (2,290); Ruston, LA
January 27, 2024; 3:30 p.m., ESPN+		at Sam Houston	L 56–60	11–10 (2–4)	13 – Hardy	5 – Tied	3 – Tied	Bernard Johnson Coliseum (1,993); Huntsville, TX
February 1, 2024; 7:00 p.m., ESPN+		Jacksonville State	W 79–71	12–10 (3–4)	17 – Frazier	6 – Kalu	4 – Powell	Don Haskins Center (3,845); El Paso, TX
February 3, 2024; 7:00 p.m., ESPN+		Liberty	L 65–67	12–11 (3–5)	15 – Frazier	7 – Tied	4 – Powell	Don Haskins Center (5,028); El Paso, TX
February 10, 2024; 7:00 p.m., ESPN+		New Mexico State; Battle of I-10	W 74–49	13–11 (4–5)	21 – Hardy	11 – Solomon	4 – Powell	Don Haskins Center (10,511); El Paso, TX
February 15, 2024; 5:00 p.m., CBSSN		at Western Kentucky	L 80–90	13–12 (4–6)	19 – Hardy	9 – Tied	4 – Hardy	E. A. Diddle Arena (3,305); Bowling Green, KY
February 17, 2024; 4:00 p.m., ESPN+		at Middle Tennessee	L 90–96 ^{2OT}	13–13 (4–7)	24 – Hardy	8 – Powell	5 – Powell	Murphy Center (2,952); Murfreesboro, TN
February 22, 2024; 7:00 p.m., ESPN+		Louisiana Tech	L 59–65	13–14 (4–8)	16 – Hamilton	7 – Frazier III	6 – Powell	Don Haskins Center (3,896); El Paso, TX
February 24, 2024; 7:00 p.m., ESPN+		Sam Houston	L 54–65	13–15 (4–9)	14 – Frazier III	6 – Powell	2 – Tied	Don Haskins Center (5,010); El Paso, TX
February 29, 2024; 5:00 p.m., ESPN+		at Jacksonville State	W 72–65	14–15 (5–9)	24 – Frazier III	4 – Tied	5 – Powell	Pete Mathews Coliseum (2,025); Jacksonville, AL
March 2, 2024; 5:00 p.m., ESPN+		at Liberty	W 67–51	15–15 (6–9)	21 – Camper Jr.	7 – Frazier III	4 – Hardy	Liberty Arena (3,643); Lynchburg, VA
March 7, 2024; 7:00 p.m., ESPN+		FIU	W 83–76	16–15 (7–9)	26 – Hardy	8 – Kalu	5 – Tied	Don Haskins Center (5,151); El Paso, TX
Conference USA tournament
March 14, 2024; 4:30 p.m., ESPN+	(5)	vs. (4) Liberty; Quarterfinals	W 66–57	17–15	13 – Powell	7 – Powell	4 – Powell	Von Braun Center (2,265); Huntsville, AL
March 15, 2024; 10:30 a.m., CBSSN	(5)	vs. (1) Sam Houston; Semifinals	W 65–63	18–15	19 – Camper Jr.	7 – Tied	2 – Tied	Von Braun Center; Huntsville, AL
March 16, 2024; 6:30 p.m., CBSSN	(5)	vs. (3) Western Kentucky; Championship	L 71–78	18–16	21 – Powell	8 – Solomon	4 – Terrell Jr.	Von Braun Center; Huntsville, AL
*Non-conference game. ^{#}Rankings from AP Poll. (#) Tournament seedings in parentheses. All times are in Mountain.
