= 2023–24 Louisiana Tech Bulldogs basketball team =

American college basketball season

2023–24 Louisiana Tech Bulldogs basketball
- Conference: Conference USA
- Record: 22–10 (12–4 C-USA)
- Head coach: Talvin Hester (2nd season)
- Assistant coaches: Winston Hines; Aaron Smith; Darshawn McClellan
- Home arena: Thomas Assembly Center

2023–24 Conference USA men's basketball standings
	Conf.				Overall
Team	W		L	PCT	W		L	PCT
Sam Houston	13	–	3	.813	21	–	12	.636
Louisiana Tech	12	–	4	.750	22	–	10	.688
Western Kentucky †	8	–	8	.500	22	–	12	.647
Liberty	7	–	9	.438	18	–	14	.563
UTEP	7	–	9	.438	18	–	16	.529
New Mexico State	7	–	9	.438	13	–	19	.406
Middle Tennessee	7	–	9	.438	14	–	19	.424
Jacksonville State	6	–	10	.375	14	–	18	.438
FIU	5	–	11	.313	11	–	22	.333
† 2024 CUSA tournament winner

The 2023–24 Louisiana Tech Bulldogs basketball team represented Louisiana Tech University during the 2023–24 NCAA Division I men's basketball season. The team, led by second-year head coach Talvin Hester, played their home games at Thomas Assembly Center in Ruston, Louisiana as a members of Conference USA.

== Previous season ==
The Bulldogs finished the 2022–23 season 15–18, 7–13 in C-USA play to finish in a tie for ninth place. They defeated FIU in the first round of the C-USA tournament before losing to North Texas in the quarterfinals.

== Offseason ==
=== Departures ===
Name	Number	Pos.	Height	Weight	Year	Hometown	Reason for departure
Keaston Willis	0	G	6'3"	190	RS Junior	Sulphur Springs, TX	Transferred to Tulsa
Kenny Hunter	1	F	6'10"	235	Sophomore	Shreveport, LA	Transferred to Texas Southern
Quandre Bullock	3	G	6'6"	195	Junior	Roxboro, NC	Transferred to Niagara
Kaleb Stewart	4	G	6'3"	180	Sophomore	Atascocita, TX	Transferred to South Dakota
Terran Williams	5	G	6'5"	200	Sophomore	Marianna, AR	Transferred to Ouachita Baptist
LaDamien Bradford	11	G	6'5"	215	RS Sophomore	Jonesboro, LA	Transferred to Xavier (NOLA)
David Green	13	F	6'7"	215	RS Sophomore	Apopka, FL	Transferred to Rhode Island
Cobe Williams	24	G	6'0"	180	Junior	Dallas, TX	Transferred to Tulsa
Pierce Geneste Jr.	34	F	6'11"	215	Freshman	Los Angeles, CA	Transferred to Fresno State

=== Incoming transfers ===
Name	Number	Pos.	Height	Weight	Year	Hometown	Previous school
Devin Ree	0	F	6'8"	180	Sophomore	Jackson, MS	Louisville
Tahlik Chavez	1	G	6'2"	160	RS Senior	Arlington, TX	Charleston Southern
Tyler Henry	3	G	6'4"	186	Senior	Brooklyn, NY	Southern Indiana
Sean Newman Jr.	4	G	6'1"	160	RS Sophomore	Culver City, CA	Fullerton College
Jordan Turner	5	G/F	6'8"	195	RS Senior	Houston, TX	Baylor
Jaylin Henderson	11	G	6'3"	175	Junior	Wichita, KS	Seward County CC
Daniel Batcho	13	F	6'11"	235	RS Junior	Paris, France	Texas Tech
Alex Vertus	21	G	6'3"		Junior	Coral Springs, FL	Polk State College
Terri Miller Jr.	34	F	6'8"	250	Junior	Fresno, CA	College of the Sequoias

=== 2023 recruiting class ===
There were no incoming recruits for the class of 2023.

=== 2024 recruiting class ===
College recruiting information
Name	Hometown	School	Height	Weight	Commit date
A.J. Bates #36 SG	Katy, Texas	Seven Lakes High School	6 ft 2 in (1.88 m)	180 lb (82 kg)	Jul 11, 2023
A.J. Bates #36 SG	Recruit ratings: Scout: Rivals: 247Sports: ESPN: (80)				
Landren Blocker #64 SF	Little Rock, Arkansas	Little Rock Christian Academy	6 ft 5 in (1.96 m)	200 lb (91 kg)	Nov 10, 2023
Landren Blocker #64 SF	Recruit ratings: Scout: Rivals: 247Sports: ESPN: (N/A)				
Albert Green; SG	San Diego, California	San Diego City College	6 ft 4 in (1.93 m)	180 lb (82 kg)	Nov 10, 2023
Albert Green; SG	Recruit ratings: Scout: Rivals: 247Sports: ESPN: (N/A)				
Clarence Payia; SF	Beaumont, Texas	Beaumont United High School	6 ft 5 in (1.96 m)	185 lb (84 kg)	Nov 25, 2023
Clarence Payia; SF	Recruit ratings: Scout: Rivals: 247Sports: ESPN: (N/A)				
Overall recruit ranking:
Note: In many cases, Scout, Rivals, 247Sports, On3, and ESPN may conflict in their listings of height and weight.; In these cases, the average was taken. ESPN grades are on a 100-point scale.; Sources: "2024 Team Ranking". Rivals.

== Roster ==
2023–24 Louisiana Tech Bulldogs men's basketball team
Players
Coaches

Pos.	#	Name	Height	Weight	Year	Previous school	Hometown
G	0	Devin Ree	6 ft 8 in (2.03 m)	180 lb (82 kg)	So	Oak Hill Academy (VA); Louisville	Jackson, MS
G	1	Tahlik Chavez	6 ft 2 in (1.88 m)	160 lb (73 kg)	RS Sr	Lake Ridge HS; Charleston Southern	Arlington, TX
F	2	Dravon Mangum	6 ft 8 in (2.03 m)	205 lb (93 kg)	GS	Person HS; Radford	Roxboro, NC
G	3	Tyler Henry	6 ft 4 in (1.93 m)	186 lb (84 kg)	Sr	Putnam Science Academy (CT); Southern Indiana	Brooklyn, NY
G	4	Sean Newman Jr.	6 ft 1 in (1.85 m)	160 lb (73 kg)	RS So	Culver City HS; Fullerton College	Los Angeles, CA
G/F	5	Jordan Turner	6 ft 8 in (2.03 m)	195 lb (88 kg)	RS Sr	Sunrise Christian Academy (KS); Baylor	Houston, TX
G	10	Ben Ponder (W)	6 ft 3 in (1.91 m)	200 lb (91 kg)	Jr	Calvary Baptist Academy	Shreveport, LA
G	11	Jaylin Henderson	6 ft 3 in (1.91 m)	175 lb (79 kg)	Jr	Wichita West HS; Seward County CC	Wichita, KS
F	12	Daniel Batcho	6 ft 11 in (2.11 m)	235 lb (107 kg)	RS Jr	Texas Tech	Paris, France
F	14	Will Allen	6 ft 7 in (2.01 m)	225 lb (102 kg)	RS So	Akfred Bonnabel HS	New Orleans, LA
G	20	Jordan Crawford	6 ft 3 in (1.91 m)	175 lb (79 kg)	So	Simsboro HS	Ruston, LA
G	21	Alex Vertus	6 ft 3 in (1.91 m)	205 lb (93 kg)	Jr	Putnam Science Academy (CT); Polk State	Coral Springs, FL
F	22	Isaiah Crawford	6 ft 6 in (1.98 m)	220 lb (100 kg)	RS Sr	North Crowley HS	Fort Worth, TX
F	34	Terri Miller Jr.	6 ft 8 in (2.03 m)	250 lb (113 kg)	Jr	Clovis North HS; College of the Sequoias	Fresno, CA

Head coach

- Talvin Hester (Texas Wesleyan)

Assistant coach(es)

- Winston Hines (Stillman)
- Aaron Smith (Prairie View A&M)
- Darshawn McClellan (Vanderbilt)

Legend

- (C) Team captain
- (S) Suspended
- (I) Ineligible
- (W) Walk-on
- Injured
- Current redshirt

Roster

== Schedule and results ==
Date time, TV	Rank^{#}	Opponent^{#}	Result	Record	High points	High rebounds	High assists	Site (attendance) city, state
Non-conference regular season
November 6, 2023*; 9:00 p.m., MW Network		at Colorado State	L 73–81	0–1	16 – Henderson	10 – Mangum	5 – Newman Jr.	Moby Arena (4,331); Fort Collins, CO
November 13, 2023*; 6:00 p.m., ESPN+		Lyon	W 100–43	1–1	24 – Henderson	10 – Mangum	7 – Newman Jr.	Thomas Assembly Center (1,907); Ruston, LA
November 16, 2023*; 6:30 p.m., ESPN+		at Louisiana–Monroe	W 73–63	2–1	24 – I. Crawford	9 – I. Crawford	4 – Chavez	Fant–Ewing Coliseum (1,702); Monroe, LA
November 21, 2023*; 3:00 p.m., ESPN+		Southern Utah; Louisiana Tech Multi-Team Event	W 67–53	3–1	18 – I. Crawford	12 – Batcho	4 – Newman Jr.	Thomas Assembly Center (2,013); Ruston, LA
November 22, 2023*; 3:00 p.m., ESPN+		McNeese; Louisiana Tech Multi-Team Event	W 71–62	4–1	17 – Batcho	8 – Batcho	7 – Newman Jr.	Thomas Assembly Center (2,012); Ruston, LA
November 25, 2023*; 2:00 p.m., ESPN+		Dillard	W 105–65	5–1	21 – Ree	14 – Batcho	5 – Newman Jr.	Thomas Assembly Center (1,993); Ruston, LA
November 29, 2023*; 8:00 p.m., MW Network		at New Mexico	L 65–74	5–2	24 – I. Crawford	12 – Batcho	3 – I. Crawford	The Pit (10,216); Albuquerque, NM
December 2, 2023*; 2:00 p.m., ESPN+		Nicholls	W 68–55	6–2	20 – Chavez	15 – Batcho	7 – I. Crawford	Thomas Assembly Center (2,018); Ruston, LA
December 5, 2023*; 6:30 p.m., ESPN+		at Stephen F. Austin	W 56–49	7–2	19 – I. Crawford	11 – Batcho	3 – Henderson	William R. Johnson Coliseum (2,328); Nacogdoches, TX
December 9, 2023*; 2:00 p.m., ESPN+		Louisiana	W 72–67	8–2	30 – Chavez	8 – Batcho	6 – I. Crawford	Thomas Assembly Center (2,474); Ruston, LA
December 12, 2023*; 6:00 p.m., ESPN+		Southeastern Louisiana	W 89–60	9–2	22 – Chavez	8 – Mangum	5 – Newman Jr.	Thomas Assembly Center (2,031); Ruston, LA
December 16, 2023*; 7:00 p.m., ESPN+		at Saint Louis	L 74–75	9–3	18 – Batcho	13 – Batcho	5 – Newman Jr.	Chaifetz Arena (4,789); St. Louis, MO
December 20, 2023*; 9:00 p.m., ESPN+		at Seattle; C-USA/WAC Alliance	L 73–79 ^{OT}	9–4	24 – Batcho	16 – Batcho	7 – Newman Jr.	Redhawk Center (702); Seattle, WA
December 30, 2023*; 7:00 p.m., ESPN+		at Grand Canyon	L 70–73	9–5	16 – Tied	6 – Batcho	9 – Newman Jr.	GCU Arena (7,436); Phoenix, AZ
January 3, 2024*; 6:00 p.m., ESPN+		Dallas Christian	W 96–55	10–5	22 – Batcho	7 – I. Crawford	9 – Newman Jr.	Thomas Assembly Center (2,013); Ruston, LA
Conference USA regular season
January 6, 2024; 4:30 p.m., ESPN+		at Sam Houston	L 77–81	10–6 (0–1)	20 – Chavez	11 – I. Crawford	4 – Chavez	Bernard Johnson Coliseum; Huntsville, TX
January 11, 2024; 8:00 p.m., CBSSN		at Middle Tennessee	W 60–52	11–6 (1–1)	16 – Batcho	13 – Batcho	3 – Newman Jr.	Murphy Center (2,505); Murfreesboro, TN
January 14, 2024; 2:00 p.m., ESPN2		Liberty	W 80–76 ^{OT}	12–6 (2–1)	22 – I. Crawford	9 – Batcho	5 – Newman Jr.	Thomas Assembly Center (2,348); Ruston, LA
January 20, 2024; 4:00 p.m., ESPN+		at Jacksonville State	W 74–57	13–6 (3–1)	30 – I. Crawford	8 – Mangum	3 – Miller Jr.	Pete Mathews Coliseum (2,120); Jacksonville, AL
January 25, 2024; 6:00 p.m., ESPN+		UTEP	W 68–54	14–6 (4–1)	19 – Batcho	12 – Batcho	6 – Newman Jr.	Thomas Assembly Center (2,290); Ruston, LA
January 27, 2024; 2:00 p.m., ESPN+		New Mexico State	W 73–53	15–6 (5–1)	25 – I. Crawford	16 – Batcho	4 – Newman Jr.	Thomas Assembly Center (2,464); Ruston, LA
February 1, 2024; 6:00 p.m., ESPN+		at FIU	W 93–53	16–6 (6–1)	27 – Chavez	13 – Batcho	10 – Newman Jr.	Ocean Bank Convocation Center (1,115); Miami, FL
February 7, 2024; 6:00 p.m., ESPN+		Western Kentucky	L 76–81	16–7 (6–2)	25 – J. Crawford	11 – Batcho	5 – Newman Jr.	Thomas Assembly Center (2,221); Ruston, LA
February 10, 2024; 7:00 p.m., ESPNU		at Liberty	L 62–65	16–8 (6–3)	19 – I. Crawford	9 – Batcho	7 – Newman Jr.	Liberty Arena (3,696); Lynchburg, VA
February 15, 2024; 6:00 p.m., ESPN+		Jacksonville State	W 63–58	17–8 (7–3)	17 – Miller Jr.	6 – J. Crawford	3 – Tied	Thomas Assembly Center (2,071); Ruston, LA
February 17, 2024; 2:00 p.m., ESPN+		FIU	W 75–68	18–8 (8–3)	24 – I. Crawford	7 – Allen	4 – J. Crawford	Thomas Assembly Center (2,273); Ruston, LA
February 22, 2024; 8:00 p.m., ESPN+		at UTEP	W 65–59	19–8 (9–3)	20 – Chavez	10 – Allen	6 – Newman Jr.	Don Haskins Center (3,896); El Paso, TX
February 24, 2024; 8:00 p.m., ESPN+		at New Mexico State	W 67–58	20–8 (10–3)	20 – I. Crawford	10 – I. Crawford	4 – J. Crawford	Pan American Center (4,724); Las Cruces, NM
February 28, 2024; 7:00 p.m., ESPN+		at Western Kentucky	W 90–84	21–8 (11–3)	20 – I. Crawford	7 – Tied	8 – Newman Jr.	E. A. Diddle Arena (5,658); Bowling Green, KY
March 7, 2024; 8:00 p.m., CBSSN		Sam Houston	L 66–72	21–9 (11–4)	20 – Batcho	9 – Batcho	5 – Newman Jr.	Thomas Assembly Center (3,092); Ruston, LA
March 9, 2024; 2:00 p.m., ESPN+		Middle Tennessee	W 84–70	22–9 (12–4)	19 – Tied	13 – I. Crawford	6 – Newman Jr.	Thomas Assembly Center (2,636); Ruston, LA
Conference USA tournament
March 13, 2024; 8:00 p.m., ESPN+	(2)	vs. (7) Middle Tennessee; Quarterfinals	L 67–70	22–10	24 – Batcho	11 – Tied	5 – Newman Jr.	Von Braun Center (678); Huntsville, AL
*Non-conference game. ^{#}Rankings from AP Poll. (#) Tournament seedings in parentheses. All times are in Central.

== See also ==
- 2023–24 Louisiana Tech Lady Techsters basketball team
