= 2023–24 Liberty Flames basketball team =

American college basketball season

2023–24 Liberty Flames basketball

Myrtle Beach Invitational champions
- Conference: Conference USA
- Record: 18–14 (7–9 C-USA)
- Head coach: Ritchie McKay (9th, 11th overall season)
- Associate head coach: Rob Jones
- Assistant coaches: Derek Johnston; Joe Pierre III
- Home arena: Liberty Arena

2023–24 Conference USA men's basketball standings
	Conf.				Overall
Team	W		L	PCT	W		L	PCT
Sam Houston	13	–	3	.813	21	–	12	.636
Louisiana Tech	12	–	4	.750	22	–	10	.688
Western Kentucky †	8	–	8	.500	22	–	12	.647
Liberty	7	–	9	.438	18	–	14	.563
UTEP	7	–	9	.438	18	–	16	.529
New Mexico State	7	–	9	.438	13	–	19	.406
Middle Tennessee	7	–	9	.438	14	–	19	.424
Jacksonville State	6	–	10	.375	14	–	18	.438
FIU	5	–	11	.313	11	–	22	.333
† 2024 CUSA tournament winner

The 2023–24 Liberty Flames basketball team represented Liberty University during the 2023–24 NCAA Division I men's basketball season. The Flames were are led by Ritchie McKay in the ninth season of his current stint as head coach (11th overall). They played their home games at Liberty Arena in Lynchburg, Virginia as first-year members of Conference USA (C-USA).

The Flames finished the season 18–14, 7–9 in C-USA play, play to finish a four-way tie for fourth place. As the No. 4 seed in the C-USA tournament they lost in the quarterfinals to UTEP.

== Previous season ==
The Flames finished the 2022–23 season 24–7, 15–2 in 2022–23 ASUN play, to tie for first place in conference standings. In the ASUN tournament they defeated Bellarmine and Eastern Kentucky before losing to Kennesaw State in the champion title match. The Flames received an at-large bid to the NIT tournament where they defeated Villanova in the first round before losing to Wisconsin in the second round.

== Offseason ==
=== Departures ===
Name	Number	Pos.	Height	Weight	Year	Hometown	Reason for departure
Darius McGhee	2	G	5' 9"	180	RS Senior	Roxboro, NC	Graduated/undrafted in 2023 NBA draft; signed with the Indiana Pacers
Isiah Warfield	3	G	6' 5"	180	Junior	Monaca, PA	Transferred to Howard
Stephen Burggraf	4	G	6' 0"	160	Senior	Lynchburg, VA	Walk-on; graduated
Jonathan Jackson	11	G	6' 4"	180	Junior	Dallas, TX	Transferred to UT Tyler
Blake Preston	32	F	6' 9"	230	RS Senior	Charlotte, NC	Graduated transferred to Northwestern

=== Incoming transfers ===
Name	Number	Pos.	Height	Weight	Year	Hometown	Previous college
Kaden Metheny	3	G	5' 11"	180	RS Junior	Morgantown, WV	Bowling Green
Zander Yates	10	F	6' 7"	225	RS Sophomore	Germantown, TN	Creighton

=== 2023 recruiting class ===
College recruiting information
Name	Hometown	School	Height	Weight	Commit date
Curtis Blair III; SG	Richmond, VA	The Steward School	6 ft 6 in (1.98 m)	185 lb (84 kg)	Mar 9, 2022
Curtis Blair III; SG	Recruit ratings: 247Sports:				
Jaylen Davis; SF	Richmond, KY	Madison Central High School	6 ft 5 in (1.96 m)	165 lb (75 kg)	
Jaylen Davis; SF	Recruit ratings: No ratings found				
Hong Kai Yu; C	Branson, MO	Link Academy	7 ft 0 in (2.13 m)	230 lb (100 kg)	
Hong Kai Yu; C	Recruit ratings: No ratings found				
Overall recruit ranking:
Note: In many cases, Scout, Rivals, 247Sports, On3, and ESPN may conflict in their listings of height and weight.; In these cases, the average was taken. ESPN grades are on a 100-point scale.; Sources: "2023 Team Ranking". Rivals.

=== 2024 recruiting class ===
College recruiting information (2024)
Name	Hometown	School	Height	Weight	Commit date
Brett Decker; PG	Elizabethtown, KY	Central Hardin High School	6 ft 1 in (1.85 m)	160 lb (73 kg)	Oct 23, 2022
Brett Decker; PG	Recruit ratings: 247Sports:				
Will Gibson; PF	Louisville, KY	DeSales High School	6 ft 6 in (1.98 m)	N/A	Oct 23, 2022
Will Gibson; PF	Recruit ratings: No ratings found				
Overall recruit ranking:
Note: In many cases, Scout, Rivals, 247Sports, On3, and ESPN may conflict in their listings of height and weight.; In these cases, the average was taken. ESPN grades are on a 100-point scale.; Sources: "2024 Team Ranking". Rivals.

=== 2025 recruiting class ===
College recruiting information (2025)
Name	Hometown	School	Height	Weight	Commit date
Zander Carter; PG	Ashland, KY	Paul G. Blazer High School	6 ft 6 in (1.98 m)	N/A	Jun 19, 2023
Zander Carter; PG	Recruit ratings: 247Sports:				
Andrew Grimes; PF	Clayton, NC	Clayton High School	6 ft 8 in (2.03 m)	N/A	Sep 4, 2023
Andrew Grimes; PF	Recruit ratings: No ratings found				
Overall recruit ranking:
Note: In many cases, Scout, Rivals, 247Sports, On3, and ESPN may conflict in their listings of height and weight.; In these cases, the average was taken. ESPN grades are on a 100-point scale.; Sources: "2025 Team Ranking". Rivals.

== Roster ==
2023–24 Liberty Flames men's basketball team
Players
Coaches

Pos.	#	Name	Height	Weight	Year	Previous school	Hometown
G	0	Colin Porter	5 ft 9 in (1.75 m)	170 lb (77 kg)	So	Paul G. Blazer HS	Ashland, KY
G	1	Brody Peebles	6 ft 2 in (1.88 m)	170 lb (77 kg)	Jr	Hartselle HS	Hartselle, AL
G	3	Kaden Metheny	5 ft 10 in (1.78 m)	170 lb (77 kg)	RS Jr	Bowling Green	Morgantown, WV
F	5	Bryson Spell	6 ft 9 in (2.06 m)	225 lb (102 kg)	RS So	Cape Henry Collegiate School	Virginia Beach, VA
G	10	JC Jr. Shirer (W)	6 ft 3 in (1.91 m)	190 lb (86 kg)	RS Fr	Grace Preparatory Academy	Arlington, TX
F	11	Zander Yates	6 ft 7 in (2.01 m)	225 lb (102 kg)	RS So	Creighton	Germantown, TN
G	12	Jaylen Davis	6 ft 6 in (1.98 m)	180 lb (82 kg)	Fr	Madison Central HS	Richmond, KY
G	21	Gabriel McKay (W)	6 ft 2 in (1.88 m)	180 lb (82 kg)	RS Sr	Trevecca Nazarene	Lynchburg, VA
F	22	Kyle Rode	6 ft 7 in (2.01 m)	220 lb (100 kg)	RS Sr	Lexington Christian Academy	Lexington, KY
G	23	Joseph Venzant	6 ft 3 in (1.91 m)	200 lb (91 kg)	Jr	Midland Christian School	Midland, TX
G	24	Curtis III Blair	6 ft 6 in (1.98 m)	210 lb (95 kg)	Fr	The Steward School	Richmond, VA
F	25	Zach Cleveland	6 ft 7 in (2.01 m)	215 lb (98 kg)	So	Normal Community HS	Bloomington, IL
F	33	Shiloh Robinson	6 ft 7 in (2.01 m)	235 lb (107 kg)	RS Sr	Kearney HS	Kearney, NE
F	34	Ben Southerland	6 ft 7 in (2.01 m)	210 lb (95 kg)	RS Fr	Sycamore HS	Cincinnati, OH
F	45	Kai Yu	7 ft 0 in (2.13 m)	245 lb (111 kg)	Fr	Link Year Prep	Zhuhai, China

Head coach

- Ritchie McKay (Seattle Pacific)

Assistant coach(es)

- Rob Jones (Toccoa Falls)
- Derek Johnston (Alabama–Huntsville)
- Joe Pierre III (Oklahoma State)

Legend

- (C) Team captain
- (S) Suspended
- (I) Ineligible
- (W) Walk-on
- Injured
- Current redshirt

Roster
Last update: November 3, 2025

== Schedule and results ==
Date time, TV	Rank^{#}	Opponent^{#}	Result	Record	High points	High rebounds	High assists	Site (attendance) city, state
Non-conference regular season
November 6, 2023*; 7:00 p.m., ESPN+		Mid-Atlantic Christian	W 103–43	1–0	20 – Peebles	9 – 2 tied	5 – Porter	Liberty Arena (3,664); Lynchburg, VA
November 10, 2023*; 4:30 p.m., ESPN+		vs. Charlotte; He Gets Us Hall of Fame Series	W 71–59	2–0	23 – Rode	8 – Venzant	3 – Cleveland	Spectrum Center (6,783); Charlotte, NC
November 16, 2023*; 7:00 p.m., ESPN+		vs. Furman; Myrtle Beach Invitational quarterfinals	W 88–74	3–0	19 – Rode	6 – Cleveland	8 – Porter	HTC Center (1,499); Conway, SC
November 17, 2023*; 9:00 p.m., ESPNU		vs. Wichita State; Myrtle Beach Invitational semifinals	W 83–66	4–0	31 – Rode	9 – Cleveland	4 – 3 tied	HTC Center (1,281); Conway, SC
November 19, 2023*; 5:30 p.m., ESPN2		vs. Vermont; Myrtle Beach Invitational final	W 71–61	5–0	21 – Cleveland	9 – Cleveland	7 – Metheny	HTC Center (1,228); Conway, SC
November 25, 2023*; 1:00 p.m., ESPN+		Maryland Eastern Shore	W 99–62	6–0	20 – Metheny	11 – Venzant	8 – Rode	Liberty Arena (2,524); Lynchburg, VA
November 30, 2023*; 6:00 p.m., ESPNU		at No. 13 Florida Atlantic; Field of 68 Tip-Off	L 58–83	6–1	16 – Porter	6 – Cleveland	3 – Rode	Eleanor R. Baldwin Arena (3,161); Boca Raton, FL
December 1, 2023*; 6:00 p.m., ESPNU		vs. Charleston; Field of 68 Tip-Off	L 67–76	6–2	18 – Rode	11 – Venzant	4 – Metheny	Eleanor R. Baldwin Arena; Boca Raton, FL
December 5, 2023*; 7:00 p.m., ESPN+		Mississippi Valley State	W 74–39	7–2	11 – Peebles	8 – Venzant	4 – 2 tied	Liberty Arena (2,942); Lynchburg, VA
December 9, 2023*; 2:00 p.m., ESPNU		Grand Canyon; C-USA/WAC Alliance	L 64–69	7–3	13 – Cleveland	11 – Venzant	3 – 2 tied	Liberty Arena (4,052); Lynchburg, VA
December 13, 2023*; 8:00 p.m., ESPN+		Tennessee State	W 74–52	8–3	18 – Rode	12 – Venzant	9 – Cleveland	Liberty Arena (2,311); Lynchburg, VA
December 16, 2023*; 1:00 p.m., ESPN+		St. Andrews	W 99–26	9–3	23 – 2 tied	7 – 3 tied	6 – Southerland	Liberty Arena (2,230); Lynchburg, VA
December 20, 2023*; 8:00 p.m., ESPN+		at Utah Valley; C-USA/WAC Alliance	W 79–63	10–3	19 – Cleveland	8 – Venzant	8 – Cleveland	UCCU Center (1,407); Orem, UT
December 30, 2023*; 2:00 p.m., SEC+/ESPN+		vs. Alabama; C.M. Newton Classic	L 56–101	10–4	14 – Metheny	6 – Cleveland	5 – Cleveland	Legacy Arena (6,912); Birmingham, AL
January 1, 2024*; 11:00 a.m., ESPN+		Boyce	W 88–46	11–4	25 – Peebles	10 – Southerland	7 – Cleveland	Liberty Arena (2,655); Lynchburg, VA
Conference USA regular season
January 6, 2024; 6:00 p.m., CBSSN		at Western Kentucky	L 68–70	11–5 (0–1)	23 – Cleveland	8 – Rode	5 – Metheny	E. A. Diddle Arena (5,057); Bowling Green, KY
January 10, 2024; 7:00 p.m., ESPN+		Jacksonville State	L 51–61	11–6 (0–2)	15 – Metheny	8 – Venzant	5 – Porter	Liberty Arena (2,384); Lynchburg, VA
January 14, 2024; 3:00 p.m., ESPNU		at Louisiana Tech	L 76–80 ^{OT}	11–7 (0–3)	20 – Rode	8 – Venzant	7 – Porter	Thomas Assembly Center (2,348); Ruston, LA
January 18, 2024; 7:00 p.m., ESPN+		FIU	W 78–69	12–7 (1–3)	19 – Rode	9 – Cleveland	6 – 3 tied	Liberty Arena (3,247); Lynchburg, VA
January 20, 2024; 7:00 p.m., ESPN+		Sam Houston	W 82–66	13–7 (2–3)	19 – Rode	9 – Porter	8 – Porter	Liberty Arena (4,005); Lynchburg, VA
January 27, 2024; 5:00 p.m., ESPN+		at Jacksonville State	L 62–73	13–8 (2–4)	17 – Rode	7 – Venzant	5 – Porter	Pete Mathews Coliseum (2,835); Jacksonville, AL
February 1, 2024; 9:00 p.m., ESPN+		at New Mexico State	L 73–79 ^{OT}	13–9 (2–5)	23 – Cleveland	8 – Cleveland	7 – Cleveland	Pan American Center; Las Cruces, NM
February 3, 2024; 9:00 p.m., ESPN+		at UTEP	W 67–65	14–9 (3–5)	21 – Metheny	6 – Venzant	7 – Cleveland	Don Haskins Center (5,028); El Paso, TX
February 8, 2024; 7:00 p.m., ESPN+		Middle Tennessee	W 88–53	15–9 (4–5)	21 – Peebles	12 – Rode	6 – Rode	Liberty Arena (3,241); Lynchburg, VA
February 10, 2024; 8:00 p.m., ESPNU		Louisiana Tech	W 65–62	16–9 (5–5)	21 – Metheny	6 – Cleveland	5 – Cleveland	Liberty Arena (3,696); Lynchburg, VA
February 17, 2024; 7:30 p.m., ESPN+		at Sam Houston	L 73–83	16–10 (5–6)	19 – Metheny	7 – Cleveland	4 – Metheny	Bernard Johnson Coliseum (1,547); Huntsville, TX
February 22, 2024; 7:00 p.m., ESPN+		at FIU	L 71–76	16–11 (5–7)	21 – Metheny	6 – Rode	3 – Rode	Ocean Bank Convocation Center (1,008); Miami, FL
February 29, 2024; 9:00 p.m., CBSSN		New Mexico State	W 83–58	17–11 (6–7)	22 – Cleveland	9 – Venzant	7 – Cleveland	Liberty Arena (3,262); Lynchburg, VA
March 2, 2024; 7:00 p.m., ESPN+		UTEP	L 51–67	17–12 (6–8)	15 – Metheny	10 – Cleveland	3 – Porter	Liberty Arena (3,643); Lynchburg, VA
March 5, 2024; 7:00 p.m., ESPN+		Middle Tennessee	L 61–69	17–13 (6–9)	17 – Cleveland	13 – Rode	3 – 2 tied	Murphy Center (2,806); Murfreesboro, TN
March 9, 2024; 1:00 p.m., ESPN+		Western Kentucky	W 82–79	18–13 (7–9)	31 – Rode	8 – Cleveland	7 – Cleveland	Liberty Arena (3,023); Lynchburg, VA
Conference USA tournament
March 14, 2024; 6:30 p.m., ESPN+	(4)	vs. (5) UTEP; Quarterfinals	L 57–66	18–14	20 – Metheny	8 – 2 tied	6 – Cleveland	Von Braun Center (2,265); Huntsville, AL
*Non-conference game. ^{#}Rankings from AP poll. (#) Tournament seedings in parentheses. All times are in Eastern.
