= 2023–24 Western Kentucky Hilltoppers basketball team =

American college basketball season

2023–24 Western Kentucky Hilltoppers basketball

CUSA tournament champions

NCAA tournament, First Round
- Conference: Conference USA
- Record: 22–12 (8–8 C-USA)
- Head coach: Steve Lutz (1st season)
- Assistant coaches: Martin Cross; Robert Guster; Darryl Jackson; Tim MacAllister; Hank Plona
- Home arena: E. A. Diddle Arena

2023–24 Conference USA men's basketball standings
	Conf.				Overall
Team	W		L	PCT	W		L	PCT
Sam Houston	13	–	3	.813	21	–	12	.636
Louisiana Tech	12	–	4	.750	22	–	10	.688
Western Kentucky †	8	–	8	.500	22	–	12	.647
Liberty	7	–	9	.438	18	–	14	.563
UTEP	7	–	9	.438	18	–	16	.529
New Mexico State	7	–	9	.438	13	–	19	.406
Middle Tennessee	7	–	9	.438	14	–	19	.424
Jacksonville State	6	–	10	.375	14	–	18	.438
FIU	5	–	11	.313	11	–	22	.333
† 2024 CUSA tournament winner

The 2023–24 Western Kentucky Hilltoppers men's basketball team represented Western Kentucky University during the 2023–24 NCAA Division I men's basketball season. The Hilltoppers, led by first year head coach Steve Lutz, played their home games at E. A. Diddle Arena in Bowling Green, Kentucky as tenth-year members of Conference USA.

== Previous season ==
The Hilltoppers finished the 2022–23 season 17–16, 8–12 in C-USA play to finish in a tie for seventh place. As the No. 8 seed in the C-USA tournament, they defeated UTEP in the first round before losing to Florida Atlantic in the quarterfinals.

On March 11, 2023, the school announced that head coach Rick Stansbury had decided to resign. On March 18, the school named Texas A&M–Corpus Christi head coach Steve Lutz the team's new head coach.

== Offseason ==
=== Departures ===
Name	Number	Pos.	Height	Weight	Year	Hometown	Reason for departure
Darrius Miles	0	C	6'10"	250	Junior	Oak Cliff, TX	Transferred to UT Arlington
Jordan Rawls	2	G	6'1"	185	Senior	Chattanooga, TN	Graduated
Jarius Hamilton	3	F	6'8"	230	RS Senior	Charlotte, NC	Graduated
Noah Stansbeury	5	G	6'0"	170	RS Sophomore	Bowling Green, KY	Walk-on; transferred to Memphis
Elijah Hughey	10	G	6'4"	200	RS Freshman	Dallas, TX	Transferred to Southeastern Oklahoma State
Emmanuel Akot	13	G	6'8"	215	RS Senior	Winnipeg, MB	Graduated/signed to play professionally in Netherlands with Heroes Den Bosch
Luke Frampton	14	G	6'5"	205	RS Senior	Poca, WV	Graduated
Dayvion McKnight	20	G	6'1"	195	Junior	Shelbyville, KY	Transferred to Xavier
Jamarion Sharp	33	C	7'5"	235	Senior	Hopkinsville, KY	Graduate transferred to Ole Miss

=== Incoming transfers ===
Name	Number	Pos.	Height	Weight	Year	Hometown	Previous School
Rodney Howard	0	C	6'10"	250	GS Senior	Ypsilanti, MI	Georgia Tech
Don McHenry	2	G	6'2"	175	Junior	Milwaukee, WI	Indian Hills CC
Jalen Jackson	3	G	5'11"	180	GS Senior	San Antonio, TX	Texas A&M–Corpus Christi
Babacar Faye	5	F	6'8"	210	Junior	Saly, Senegal	Charleston
Brandon Newman	10	G	6'5"	200	RS Senior	Valparaiso, IN	Purdue
Terrion Murdix	12	G	6'1"	170	GS Senior	Springfield, IL	Texas A&M–Corpus Christi
BJ Marable	13	F/C	6'9"		Junior	Knoxville, TN	Triton College
Enoch Kalambay	23	G	6'6"	200	Junior	Gatineau, QC	Indian Hills CC

=== Recruiting classes ===
==== 2023 recruiting class ====
College recruiting information
Name	Hometown	School	Height	Weight	Commit date
Teagan Moore; SG	Owenton, KY	Owen County High School	6 ft 5 in (1.96 m)	210 lb (95 kg)	Jul 13, 2022
Teagan Moore; SG	Recruit ratings: Scout: Rivals: 247Sports: ESPN: (NR)				
Overall recruit ranking:
Note: In many cases, Scout, Rivals, 247Sports, On3, and ESPN may conflict in their listings of height and weight.; In these cases, the average was taken. ESPN grades are on a 100-point scale.; Sources: "2023 Team Ranking". Rivals.

== Roster ==
2023–24 WKU Hilltoppers men's basketball team
Players
Coaches

Pos.	#	Name	Height	Weight	Year	Previous school	Hometown
C	0	Rodney Howard	6 ft 10 in (2.08 m)	250 lb (113 kg)	GS	Legacy Charter School; Georgia Tech	Ypsilanti, MI
F/C	1	Fallou Diagne	6 ft 11 in (2.11 m)	205 lb (93 kg)	RS Jr	Compass Prep; Northwest Florida State College	Dakar, Senegal
G	2	Don McHenry	6 ft 2 in (1.88 m)	160 lb (73 kg)	Jr	Milwaukee Academy of Science; Indian Hills CC	Milwaukee, WI
G	3	Jalen Jackson	5 ft 11 in (1.8 m)	180 lb (82 kg)	GS	Wagner HS; Texas A&M–Corpus Christi	San Antonio, TX
G	4	Khristian Lander	6 ft 3 in (1.91 m)	195 lb (88 kg)	Sr	FJ Reitz HS; Indiana	Evansville, IN
F	5	Babacar Faye	6 ft 8 in (2.03 m)	205 lb (93 kg)	Jr	NBA Academy Africa; Charleston	Saly, Senegal
G	10	Brandon Newman	6 ft 5 in (1.96 m)	195 lb (88 kg)	RS Sr	Valparaiso HS; Purdue	Valparaiso, IN
G	11	Dontaie Allen	6 ft 6 in (1.98 m)	210 lb (95 kg)	RS Sr	Pendleton County HS; Kentucky	Falmouth, KY
G	12	Terrion Murdix	6 ft 1 in (1.85 m)	170 lb (77 kg)	GS	Springfield Southeast HS; Texas A&M–Corpus Christi	Springfield, IL
F	13	BJ Marable	6 ft 9 in (2.06 m)	230 lb (104 kg)	So	Grace Christian Academy; Triton College	Knoxville, TN
G	15	Jack Edelen (W)	5 ft 10 in (1.78 m)	170 lb (77 kg)	Fr	Male HS	Louisville, KY
F	22	Jaylen Dorsey (W)	6 ft 4 in (1.93 m)	210 lb (95 kg)	Jr	Berea HS	Berea, KY
G	23	Enoch Kalambay	6 ft 6 in (1.98 m)	205 lb (93 kg)	Jr	Orangeville Prep; Indian Hills CC	Gatineau, QC
F	24	Tyrone Marshall Jr.	6 ft 7 in (2.01 m)	215 lb (98 kg)	Sr	Pearl Cohn HS; Northwest Florida State College	Nashville, TN
G	30	Teagan Moore	6 ft 5 in (1.96 m)	210 lb (95 kg)	Fr	Owen County HS	Dry Ridge, KY
G	31	Tyler Olden (W)	5 ft 11 in (1.8 m)	190 lb (86 kg)	Jr	Hillcrest Prep	Scottsdale, AZ

Head coach

- Steve Lutz (Texas Lutheran)

Assistant coach(es)

- Martin Cross (Western Kentucky)
- Robert Guster (Missouri–Rolla)
- Darryl Jackson (Valparaiso)
- Tim MacAllister (Murray State)
- Hank Plona (Providence)

Legend

- (C) Team captain
- (S) Suspended
- (I) Ineligible
- (W) Walk-on
- Injured
- Current redshirt

Roster

== Schedule and results ==
Date time, TV	Rank^{#}	Opponent^{#}	Result	Record	High points	High rebounds	High assists	Site (attendance) city, state
Non-conference Regular season
November 6, 2023*; 7:30 p.m., ESPN+		Kentucky Wesleyan	W 90–64	1–0	14 – Newman	10 – Faye	4 – McHenry	E. A. Diddle Arena (3,890); Bowling Green, KY
November 9, 2023*; 6:30 p.m., ESPN+		at Wichita State	L 61–71	1–1	12 – McHenry	8 – Marshall	1 – Tied	Charles Koch Arena (6,351); Wichita, KS
November 14, 2023*; 7:00 p.m., ESPN+		at Murray State	W 86–81	2–1	22 – McHenry	7 – Newman	2 – Tied	CFSB Center (5,677); Murray, KY
November 18, 2023*; 7:00 p.m., ESPN+		Kentucky State	W 95–75	3–1	17 – Newman	10 – Newman	6 – McHenry	E. A. Diddle Arena (3,411); Bowling Green, KY
November 24, 2023*; 6:00 p.m., −		vs. Bowling Green; Northern Classic	W 72–65	4–1	17 – McHenry	8 – Newman	3 – McHenry	Place Bell (−); Laval, QC
November 25, 2023*; 1:00 p.m., −		vs. Canisius; Northern Classic	L 77–85	4–2	16 – McHenry	10 – Faye	3 – Allen	Place Bell (−); Laval, QC
November 26, 2023*; 10:00 a.m., −		vs. UNC Asheville; Northern Classic	L 67–77	4–3	14 – Jackson	7 – Faye	2 – Tied	Place Bell (−); Laval, QC
November 29, 2023*; 7:00 p.m., ESPN+		Campbellsville	W 101–77	5–3	22 – Lander	9 – Faye	6 – Jackson	E. A. Diddle Arena (2,702); Bowling Green, KY
December 3, 2023*; 4:00 p.m., ESPN+		Eastern Kentucky	W 79–69	6–3	19 – Newman	9 – Tied	5 – Newman	E. A. Diddle Arena (3,511); Bowling Green, KY
December 9, 2023*; 1:00 p.m., ESPN+		at Buffalo	W 82–65	7–3	16 – McHenry	8 – Newman	5 – Lander	Alumni Arena (2,186); Amherst, NY
December 12, 2023*; 6:00 p.m., ESPN+		at Wright State	W 91–84	8–3	30 – McHenry	7 – Marshall	4 – Howard	Nutter Center (3,138); Fairborn, OH
December 16, 2023*; 2:00 p.m., ESPN+		Austin Peay	W 65–64	9–3	16 – McHenry	6 – Tied	3 – McHenry	E. A. Diddle Arena (3,109); Bowling Green, KY
December 19, 2023*; 9:00 p.m., ESPN+		at California Baptist; C-USA/WAC Alliance	W 73–70	10–3	17 – Allen	12 – Newman	4 – McHenry	CBU Events Center (2,522); Riverside, CA
December 30, 2023*; 2:00 p.m., ESPN+		Abilene Christian; C-USA/WAC Alliance	W 86–84	11–3	20 – Marshall Jr.	8 – McHenry	3 – Lander	E. A. Diddle Arena (4,011); Bowling Green, KY
Conference USA regular season
January 6, 2024; 5:00 p.m., CBSSN		Liberty	W 70–68	12–3 (1–0)	18 – McHenry	9 – Howard	5 – Lander	E. A. Diddle Arena (5,057); Bowling Green, KY
January 10, 2024; 6:30 p.m., ESPN+		at Sam Houston	L 74–78	12–4 (1–1)	15 – McHenry	6 – Tied	6 – Lander	Bernard Johnson Coliseum (714); Huntsville, TX
January 13, 2024; 4:00 p.m., CBSSN		Jacksonville State	W 80–69	13–4 (2–1)	25 – Newman	8 – Kalambay	4 – Tied	E. A. Diddle Arena (4,580); Bowling Green, KY
January 18, 2024; 8:00 p.m., ESPN+		at New Mexico State	L 70–72	13–5 (2–2)	19 – Lander	8 – Tied	4 – Tied	Pan American Center (5,243); Las Cruces, NM
January 20, 2024; 8:00 p.m., ESPN+		at UTEP	L 87–93	13–6 (2–3)	18 – McHenry	9 – Kalambay	5 – McHenry	Don Haskins Center (4,151); El Paso, TX
January 25, 2024; 7:00 p.m., ESPN+		FIU	W 105–91	14–6 (3–3)	30 – Allen	8 – Tied	6 – McHenry	E. A. Diddle Arena (4,144); Bowling Green, KY
February 1, 2024; 8:00 p.m., CBSSN		Sam Houston	L 77–79	14–7 (3–4)	21 – McHenry	10 – Allen	3 – Tied	E. A. Diddle Arena (3,757); Bowling Green, KY
February 3, 2024; 7:00 p.m., ESPNU		Middle Tennessee	W 88–65	15–7 (4–4)	22 – McHenry	7 – Kalambay	3 – Tied	E. A. Diddle Arena (5,527); Bowling Green, KY
February 7, 2024; 6:00 p.m., ESPN+		at Louisiana Tech	W 81–76	16–7 (5–4)	20 – McHenry	8 – Faye	3 – McHenry	Thomas Assembly Center (2,221); Ruston, LA
February 10, 2024; 4:00 p.m., ESPN+		at Jacksonville State	W 70–59	17–7 (6–4)	24 – McHenry	11 – Faye	5 – Newman	Pete Mathews Coliseum (2,433); Jacksonville, AL
February 15, 2024; 6:00 p.m., CBSSN		UTEP	W 90–80	18–7 (7–4)	25 – McHenry	10 – Faye	5 – McHenry	E. A. Diddle Arena (3,305); Bowling Green, KY
February 17, 2024; 2:00 p.m., ESPN+		New Mexico State	W 72–58	19–7 (8–4)	12 – Moore	5 – Tied	5 – Marshall	E. A. Diddle Arena (5,102); Bowling Green, KY
February 24, 2024; 6:30 p.m., ESPN+		at Middle Tennessee	L 72–74	19–8 (8–5)	14 – Newman	7 – Howard	3 – Tied	Murphy Center (5,038); Murfreesboro, TN
February 28, 2024; 7:00 p.m., ESPN+		Louisiana Tech	L 84–90	19–9 (8–6)	22 – Moore	6 – Faye	3 – Marshall Jr.	E. A. Diddle Arena (5,658); Bowling Green, KY
March 2, 2024; 5:00 p.m., ESPN+		at FIU	L 83–85	19–10 (8–7)	14 – Faye	10 – Marshall Jr.	4 – Edelen	Ocean Bank Convocation Center (990); Miami, FL
March 9, 2024; 12:00 p.m., ESPN+		at Liberty	L 79–82	19–11 (8–8)	16 – Moore	6 – Kalambay	3 – Lander	Liberty Arena (3,023); Lynchburg, VA
Conference USA Tournament
March 14, 2024; 8:00 p.m., ESPN+	(3)	vs. (6) New Mexico State; Quarterfinals	W 89–69	20–11	20 – Howard	8 – Kalambay	4 – Edelen	Von Braun Center (2,333); Huntsville, AL
March 15, 2024; 2:00 p.m., CBSSN	(3)	vs. (7) Middle Tennessee; Semifinals	W 85–54	21–11	18 – McHenry	10 – Moore	2 – Tied	Von Braun Center (3,272); Huntsville, AL
March 16, 2024; 7:30 p.m., CBSSN	(3)	vs. (5) UTEP; Championship	W 78–71	22–11	25 – McHenry	10 – Faye	3 – Marshall Jr.	Von Braun Center (4,541); Huntsville, AL
NCAA Tournament
March 22, 2024*; 1:00 p.m., TBS	(15 S)	vs. (2 S) No. 8 Marquette; First Round	L 69–87	22–12	21 – Marshall	8 – McHenry	5 – Marshall	Gainbridge Fieldhouse; Indianapolis, IN
*Non-conference game. ^{#}Rankings from AP Poll. (#) Tournament seedings in parentheses. S=South. All times are in Central Time.
