= 2024 Conference USA men's basketball tournament =

- Classification: Division I
- Season: 2023–24
- Teams: 9
- Site: Propst Arena; Huntsville, Alabama
- Champions: Western Kentucky (1st title)
- Winning coach: Steve Lutz (1st title)
- Attendance: 14,161 (total); 4,541 (championship)
- Television: ESPN+, CBSSN

2023–24 Conference USA men's basketball standings
	Conf.				Overall
Team	W		L	PCT	W		L	PCT
Sam Houston	13	–	3	.813	21	–	12	.636
Louisiana Tech	12	–	4	.750	22	–	10	.688
Western Kentucky †	8	–	8	.500	22	–	12	.647
Liberty	7	–	9	.438	18	–	14	.563
UTEP	7	–	9	.438	18	–	16	.529
New Mexico State	7	–	9	.438	13	–	19	.406
Middle Tennessee	7	–	9	.438	14	–	19	.424
Jacksonville State	6	–	10	.375	14	–	18	.438
FIU	5	–	11	.313	11	–	22	.333
† 2024 CUSA tournament winner

The 2024 Conference USA men's basketball tournament is a postseason tournament held from March 12–16, 2024, at Von Braun Center in Huntsville, Alabama.

== Seeds ==
Teams were seeded by conference record. The top seven teams received byes to the quarterfinals.

Seed	School	Conference record	Tiebreaker #1	Tiebreaker #2	Tiebreaker #3
1	Sam Houston	13–3			
2	Louisiana Tech	12–4			
3	Western Kentucky	8–8			
4	Liberty	7–9	1–1 vs. Sam Houston		
5	UTEP	7–9	0–2 vs. Sam Houston	2–0 vs. JSU	Higher RPI
6	New Mexico State	7–9	0–2 vs. Sam Houston	2–0 vs. JSU	Lower RPI
7	Middle Tennessee	7–9	0–2 vs. Sam Houston	1–1 vs. JSU	
8	Jacksonville State	6–10			
9	FIU	5–11			

== Schedule ==
Game	Time	Matchup	Score	Television	Attendance
First round – March 12, 2024
1	8:00 pm	No. 8 Jacksonville State vs. No. 9 FIU	67–76	ESPN+	444
Quarterfinals – March 13, 2024
2	5:30 pm	No. 1 Sam Houston vs. No. 9 FIU	78–59	ESPN+	628
3	8:00 pm	No. 2 Louisiana Tech vs. No. 7 Middle Tennessee	67–70	ESPN+	678
Quarterfinals – March 14, 2024
4	5:30 pm	No. 4 Liberty vs. No. 5 UTEP	57–66	ESPN+	2,265
5	8:00 pm	No. 3 Western Kentucky vs. No. 6 New Mexico State	89–69	ESPN+	2,333
Semifinals – March 15, 2024
6	11:30 am	No. 1 Sam Houston vs. No. 5 UTEP	63–65	CBSSN	3,272
7	2:00 pm	No. 7 Middle Tennessee vs. No. 3 Western Kentucky	54–85	CBSSN	3,272
Championship – March 16, 2024
8	7:30 pm	No. 5 UTEP vs No. 3 Western Kentucky	71–78	CBSSN	4,541
*Game times in CT. ()-Rankings denote tournament seeding.

== Bracket ==
First round Tuesday, March 12
8	Jacksonville State	67
9	Florida International	76

Quarterfinals; Wednesday, March 13; Thursday, March 14
1	Sam Houston State	78
9	Florida International	59
4	Liberty	57
5	UTEP	66
2	Louisiana Tech	67
7	Middle Tennessee	70
3	Western Kentucky	89
6	New Mexico State	69

Semifinals; Friday, March 15
1	Sam Houston State	63
5	UTEP	65
7	Middle Tennessee	54
3	Western Kentucky	85

Championship; Saturday, March 16
5	UTEP	71
3	Western Kentucky	78

* – Denotes overtime period

== See also ==
- 2024 Conference USA women's basketball tournament
- Conference USA men's basketball tournament
- Conference USA
