= 2023–24 New Orleans Privateers men's basketball team =

American college basketball season

2023–24 New Orleans Privateers men's basketball
- Conference: Southland Conference
- Record: 10–23 (4–14 Southland)
- Head coach: Mark Slessinger (13th season)
- Assistant coaches: Nick Bowman; Cory Dickson; Javan Felix
- Home arena: Lakefront Arena

2023–24 Southland Conference men's basketball standings
	Conf.				Overall
Team	W		L	PCT	W		L	PCT
McNeese †	17	–	1	.944	30	–	4	.882
Texas A&M–Corpus Christi	14	–	4	.778	21	–	12	.636
Nicholls	13	–	5	.722	20	–	14	.588
Lamar	12	–	6	.667	19	–	14	.576
Southeastern Louisiana	10	–	8	.556	15	–	17	.469
Northwestern State	7	–	11	.389	9	–	23	.281
Texas A&M–Commerce*	6	–	12	.333	13	–	20	.394
New Orleans	4	–	14	.222	10	–	23	.303
Houston Christian	4	–	14	.222	6	–	23	.207
Incarnate Word	3	–	15	.167	8	–	23	.258
† 2024 Southland tournament winner * ineligible for the 2024 NCAA tournament due to transition period

The 2023–24 New Orleans Privateers men's basketball team represented the University of New Orleans during the 2023–24 NCAA Division I men's basketball season. The Privateers were led by 13th-year head coach Mark Slessinger and played their home games at Lakefront Arena in New Orleans, Louisiana as members of the Southland Conference.

The Privateers finished the season 10–23, 4–14 in Southland play, to finish in a tie for eighth place. They upset Southeastern Louisiana before falling to Lamar in the second round of the Southland tournament.

On April 19, 2024, head coach Mark Slessinger left the program after 13 years at the helm, in order to take the associate head coaching position at Indiana State. On April 25, the school announced that they would be hiring Texas Southern assistant coach Stacy Hollowell as the team's next head coach.

== Preseason polls ==
=== Southland Conference Poll ===
The Southland Conference released its preseason poll on October 10, 2023. Receiving 132 votes overall and three first-place votes, the Privateers were picked to finish third in the conference.

Predicted finish	Team	Votes (1st place)
1	Southeastern	144 (6)
2	McNeese	142 (6)
3	New Orleans	132 (3)
4	Texas A&M–Corpus Christi	124 (5)
5	Northwestern State	84
6	Nicholls	71
7	Texas A&M–Commerce	66
8	Houston Christian	50
9	Lamar	45
10	Incarnate Word	42

=== Preseason All-Conference ===
Jordan Johnson, a guard, was selected as a first team member of a Preseason All-Conference team. Tyson Jackson, a forward, was selected as a second-team member.

== Roster ==
2023–24 New Orleans Privateers men's basketball team
Players
Coaches

Pos.	#	Name	Height	Weight	Year	Hometown
G	0	Mason James	6 ft 4 in (1.93 m)	210 lb (95 kg)	So	Chicago, IL
G	1	Jordan Johnson	6 ft 1 in (1.85 m)	170 lb (77 kg)	Sr	Memphis, TN
G	2	Jah Short	6 ft 3 in (1.91 m)	180 lb (82 kg)	Fr	Farmville, NC
F	3	D'ante Bell	6 ft 9 in (2.06 m)	215 lb (98 kg)	Jr	Shreveport, LA
F	4	Omarion Henry	6 ft 7 in (2.01 m)	205 lb (93 kg)	So	St. Louis, MO
F	5	Tyson Jackson	6 ft 9 in (2.06 m)	245 lb (111 kg)	Sr	Atlanta, GA
G	10	Kaleb Jenkins	5 ft 10 in (1.78 m)	175 lb (79 kg)	GS	New Orleans, LA
G	11	Preston Jr. Murphey	6 ft 1 in (1.85 m)	175 lb (79 kg)	So	Barrington, RI
G	12	Spencer Simes	6 ft 2 in (1.88 m)	205 lb (93 kg)	Sr	North Little Rock, AR
G	13	Jamond Vincent	6 ft 4 in (1.93 m)	215 lb (98 kg)	Jr	New Orleans, LA
G	15	Carlos Hart	6 ft 6 in (1.98 m)	210 lb (95 kg)	Jr	Miami, FL
G	20	Khaleb Wilson-Rouse	6 ft 2 in (1.88 m)	185 lb (84 kg)	Sr	Chicago, IL
F	22	Darrius Washington	6 ft 8 in (2.03 m)	230 lb (104 kg)	Jr	Louisville, KY
F	23	James III Glisson	6 ft 7 in (2.01 m)	255 lb (116 kg)	GS	Decatur, GA
G	24	Cole Sinclair	6 ft 1 in (1.85 m)	175 lb (79 kg)	So	Durham, NC
G	32	Dorian Hill	6 ft 2 in (1.88 m)	165 lb (75 kg)	So	Hampton, VA
F	33	Dorian Booker	6 ft 11 in (2.11 m)	275 lb (125 kg)	Fr	Baton Rouge, LA

Head coach

- Mark Slessinger (Aurora)

Assistant coach(es)

- Nick Bowman (Eastern Kentucky)
- Cory Dixon (New Orleans)
- Javan Felix (Texas)

Legend

- (C) Team captain
- (S) Suspended
- (I) Ineligible
- (W) Walk-on
- Injured
- Current redshirt

Roster
Last update: October 19, 2023

== Schedule and results ==
Date time, TV	Rank^{#}	Opponent^{#}	Result	Record	High points	High rebounds	High assists	Site (attendance) city, state
Non-conference regular season
November 6, 2023*; 6:30 p.m., ESPN+		Millsaps	W 100–70	1–0	18 – J. Johnson	9 – J. Vincent	6 – J. Vincent	Lakefront Arena (1,207); New Orleans, LA
November 11, 2023*; 4:00 p.m., ESPN+		SUNO	W 106–69	2–0	21 – J. Johnson	13 – J. Short	8 – J. Johnson	Lakefront Arena (1,058); New Orleans, LA
November 18, 2023*; 3:00 p.m., ESPN+		at Loyola	L 70–73	2–1	31 – J. Johnson	7 – J. Vincent	4 – tied (2)	Joseph J. Gentile Arena (2,833); Chicago, IL
November 20, 2023*; 7:00 p.m., ESPN+		at Oklahoma State	L 68–96	2–2	23 – J. Johnson	4 – tied (2)	2 – tied (2)	Gallagher-Iba Arena (5,907); Stillwater, OK
November 25, 2023*; 2:00 p.m.		vs. North Dakota; Central Arkansas Classic	L 69–71 ^{OT}	2–3	18 – J. Johnson	12 – D. Bell	3 – J. Johnson	Farris Center (105); Conway, AR
November 26, 2023*; 2:45 p.m., ESPN+		at Central Arkansas; Central Arkansas Classic	W 79–74	3–3	29 – J. Johnson	8 – K. Wilson-Rouse	4 – J. Johnson	Farris Center (645); Conway, AR
November 30, 2023*; 6:00 p.m., BTN		at Minnesota	L 64–97	3–4	19 – K. Wilson-Rouse	6 – J. Johnson	3 – J. Johnson	Williams Arena (6,797); Minneapolis, MN
December 5, 2023*; 6:30 p.m., ESPN+		Belhaven	W 79–65	4–4	29 – J. Johnson	9 – J. Vincent	7 – J. Johnson	Lakefront Arena (727); New Orleans, LA
December 9, 2023*; 4:00 p.m., MW Network		at San Jose State	L 82–87	4–5	24 – J. Johnson	8 – J. Short	6 – J. Johnson	Provident Credit Union Event Center (1,747); San Jose, CA
December 11, 2023*; 9:00 p.m., ESPN+		at San Francisco	L 72–85	4–6	28 – J. Johnson	5 – T. Jackson	2 – J. Johnson	Sobrato Center; San Francisco, CA
December 14, 2023*; 6:30 p.m., ESPN+		Birmingham–Southern	W 91–51	5–6	16 – J. Johnson	12 – J. Vincent	5 – J. Johnson	Lakefront Arena (711); New Orleans, LA
December 21, 2023*; 6:00 p.m., BTN Plus		at Ohio State	L 36–78	5–7	8 – J. Johnson	6 – T. Jackson	2 – J. Johnson	Value City Arena (11,749); Columbus, OH
December 29, 2023*; 6:30 p.m., ESPN+		at Stephen F. Austin	L 51–80	5–8	12 – J. Johnson	6 – J. Short	2 – J. Johnson	William R. Johnson Coliseum (2,120); Nacogdoches, TX
Southland Conference regular season
January 6, 2024; 4:00 p.m., ESPN+		Southeastern Louisiana	L 68–73	5–9 (0–1)	17 – K. Wilson-Rouse	4 – J. Vincent	6 – J. Johnson	Lakefront Arena (1,139); New Orleans, LA
January 8, 2024; 6:30 p.m., ESPN+		Texas A&M–Commerce	W 88–85	6–9 (1–1)	36 – J. Johnson	12 – J. Vincent	6 – J. Johnson	Lakefront Arena (404); New Orleans, LA
January 13, 2024; 4:00 p.m., ESPN+		Texas A&M–Corpus Christi	W 83–80	7–9 (2–1)	40 – J. Johnson	7 – J. Johnson	3 – tied (2)	Lakefront Arena (792); New Orleans, LA
January 15, 2024; 6:30 p.m., ESPN+		at Nicholls	L 75–78	7–10 (2–2)	18 – T. Jackson	8 – J. Short	5 – J. Johnson	Stopher Gymnasium (950); Thibodaux, LA
January 20, 2024; 4:00 p.m., ESPN+		Northwestern State	L 67–92	7–11 (2–3)	16 – T. Jackson	8 – T. Jackson	2 – J. Johnson	Lakefront Arena (1,030); New Orleans, LA
January 22, 2024; 7:00 p.m., ESPN+		at Houston Christian	L 80–88	7–12 (2–4)	35 – J. Johnson	6 – K. Wilson-Rouse	3 – J. Johnson	Sharp Gymnasium (709); Houston, TX
January 27, 2024; 4:00 p.m., ESPN+		at McNeese	L 65–102	7–13 (2–5)	17 – J. Vincent	13 – T. Jackson	4 – J. Johnson	The Legacy Center (4,200); Lake Charles, LA
January 29, 2024; 7:00 p.m., ESPN+		at Lamar	L 73–98	7–14 (2–6)	19 – T. Jackson	7 – T. Jackson	4 – J. Short	Neches Arena (1,243); Beaumont, TX
February 3, 2024; 4:00 p.m., ESPN+		Incarnate Word	L 80–82	7–15 (2–7)	23 – J. Johnson	7 – J. Vincent	5 – J. Johnson	Lakefront Arena (748); New Orleans, LA
February 5, 2024; 6:30 p.m., ESPN+		Houston Christian	W 84–58	8–15 (3–7)	24 – J. Johnson	8 – J. Vincent	6 – K. Wilson-Rouse	Lakefront Arena (782); New Orleans, LA
February 10, 2024; 1:00 p.m., ESPN+		at Texas A&M–Commerce	L 83–89	8–16 (3–8)	21 – C. Hart	8 – C. Hart	5 – J. Johnson	The Field House (556); Commerce, TX
February 12, 2024; 6:30 p.m., ESPN+		at Northwestern State	L 59–70	8–17 (3–9)	– T. Jackson	– T. Jackson	– T. Wilson-Rouse	Prather Coliseum (621); Natchitoches, LA
February 17, 2024; 4:00 p.m., ESPN+		Lamar	L 72–94	8–18 (3–10)	20 – K. Wilson-Rouse	4 – tied (3)	5 – J. Johnson	Lakefront Arena (792); New Orleans, LA
February 19, 2024; 6:30 p.m., ESPN+		Nicholls	L 77–89	8–19 (3–11)	20 – C. Hart	7 – C. Hart	3 – tied (3)	Lakefront Arena (708); New Orleans, LA
February 24, 2024; 3:30 p.m., ESPN+		Southeastern Louisiana	L 67–77	8–20 (3–12)	22 – J. Johnson	8 – T. Jackson	4 – K. Wilson-Rouse	Pride Roofing University Center (929); Hammond, LA
March 2, 2024; 5:00 p.m., ESPN+		at Incarnate Word	W 87–80	9–20 (4–12)	31 – J. Johnson	13 – T. Jackson	3 – J. Johnson	McDermott Center (151); San Antonio, TX
March 4, 2024; 7:00 p.m., ESPN+		at Texas A&M–Corpus Christi	L 60–73	9–21 (4–13)	16 – J. Johnson	7 – tied (2)	3 – J. Johnson	American Bank Center (1,358); Corpus Christi, TX
March 6, 2024; 7:00 p.m., ESPN+		McNeese	L 57–81	9–22 (4–14)	21 – J. Johnson	10 – C. Hart	5 – J. Johnson	Lakefront Arena (959); New Orleans, LA
Southland tournament
March 10, 2024; 5:00 p.m., ESPN+	(8)	vs. (5) Southeastern Louisiana; First round	W 78–66	10–22	34 – J. Johnson	10 – J. Glisson III	5 – K. Wilson-Rouse	The Legacy Center; Lake Charles, LA
March 11, 2024; 5:00 p.m., ESPN+	(8)	vs. (4) Lamar; Second round	L 57–71	10–23	10 – tied (3)	6 – K. Wilson-Rouse	2 – K. Wilson-Rouse	The Legacy Center; Lake Charles, LA
*Non-conference game. ^{#}Rankings from AP poll. (#) Tournament seedings in parentheses. All times are in Central.

== National awards and honors ==
Jordan Johnson was named week nine Associated Press national player of the week on January 16, 2024.

== Conference awards and honors ==
=== Weekly awards ===
Weekly honors
Honors	Player	Position	Date awarded	Ref.
SLC Men's Basketball Player of the Week	Jordan Johnson	G	November 27, 2023	
SLC Men's Basketball Player of the Week	Jordan Johnson	G	January 15, 2024	

== See also ==
- 2023–24 New Orleans Privateers women's basketball team
