= 2023–24 Houston Christian Huskies men's basketball team =

American college basketball season

2023–24 Houston Christian Huskies men's basketball
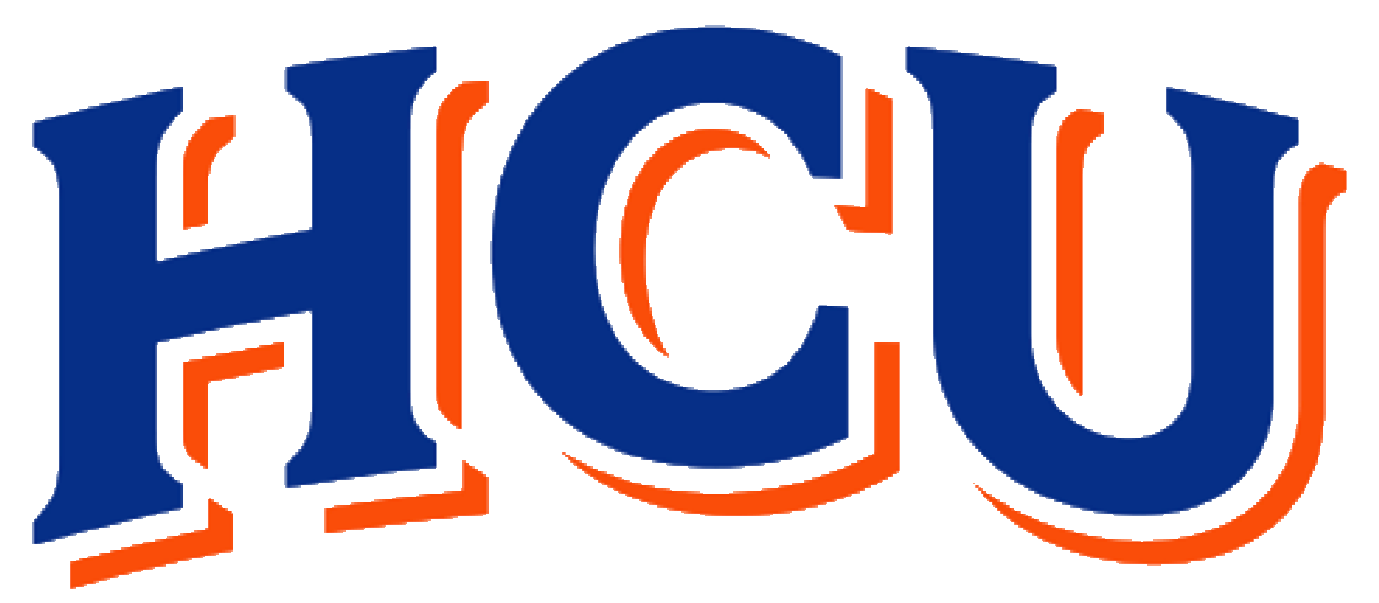
- Conference: Southland Conference
- Record: 6–23 (4–14 Southland)
- Head coach: Ron Cottrell (33rd season)
- Assistant coaches: Jud Kinne; Terry Johnson; Dee Wallace
- Home arena: Sharp Gymnasium

2023–24 Southland Conference men's basketball standings
	Conf.				Overall
Team	W		L	PCT	W		L	PCT
McNeese †	17	–	1	.944	30	–	4	.882
Texas A&M–Corpus Christi	14	–	4	.778	21	–	12	.636
Nicholls	13	–	5	.722	20	–	14	.588
Lamar	12	–	6	.667	19	–	14	.576
Southeastern Louisiana	10	–	8	.556	15	–	17	.469
Northwestern State	7	–	11	.389	9	–	23	.281
Texas A&M–Commerce*	6	–	12	.333	13	–	20	.394
New Orleans	4	–	14	.222	10	–	23	.303
Houston Christian	4	–	14	.222	6	–	23	.207
Incarnate Word	3	–	15	.167	8	–	23	.258
† 2024 Southland tournament winner * ineligible for the 2024 NCAA tournament due to transition period

The 2023–24 Houston Christian Huskies men's basketball team represented Houston Christian University in the 2023–24 NCAA Division I men's basketball season. The Huskies, led by 33rd-year head coach Ron Cottrell, played their home games at Sharp Gymnasium in Houston, Texas as members of the Southland Conference. They finished the season 6–23, 4–14 in Southland play to finish in a tie for eighth place. They failed to qualify for the Southland tournament.

On March 7, 2024, the school fired Ron Cottrell, who had been the team's head coach since 1991.

== Previous season ==
The Huskies finished the season 10–22, 7–11 in Southland play to finish in a tie for sixth place. As the No. 6 seed in the Southland tournament, they lost New Orleans in the first round.

The season marked the first as Houston Christian, the school having changed its name in September of 2022.

== Preseason polls ==
=== Southland Conference poll ===
The Southland Conference released its preseason poll on October 10, 2023. Receiving 50 votes overall, the Huskies were picked to finish eighth in the conference.

Predicted finish	Team	Votes (1st place)
1	Southeastern	144 (6)
2	McNeese	142 (6)
3	New Orleans	132 (3)
4	Texas A&M–Corpus Christi	124 (5)
5	Northwestern State	84
6	Nicholls	71
7	Texas A&M–Commerce	66
8	Houston Christian	50
9	Lamar	45
10	Incarnate Word	42

=== Preseason All Conference ===
Senior center Bonke Maring was named Preseason All-Conference first team.

== Roster ==
2023–24 Houston Christian Huskies men's basketball team
Players
Coaches

Pos.	#	Name	Height	Weight	Year	Hometown
G	0	Marques Gates	6 ft 0 in (1.83 m)	186 lb (84 kg)	So	Selma, Texas
G	2	Pierce Bazil	6 ft 3 in (1.91 m)	185 lb (84 kg)	So	Lincoln, Nebraska
G	3	Jay Alvarez	6 ft 5 in (1.96 m)	210 lb (95 kg)	Jr	Waynesboro, Pennsylvania
C	4	Bonke Maring	6 ft 10 in (2.08 m)	258 lb (117 kg)	Sr	Cypress, Texas
G	5	Porter Bazil	6 ft 7 in (2.01 m)	210 lb (95 kg)	Fr	Lincoln, Nebraska
G	6	Deshon Proctor	6 ft 5 in (1.96 m)	207 lb (94 kg)	Jr	Tyrone, Georgia
G	7	Dominic Capriotti	6 ft 3 in (1.91 m)	185 lb (84 kg)	RS Fr	Tempe, Arizona
G	8	Bruce Carpenter	6 ft 2 in (1.88 m)	180 lb (82 kg)	Jr	Atlanta, Georgia
G	10	Marcus Green	6 ft 2 in (1.88 m)	190 lb (86 kg)	Jr	Gilroy, California
F	11	Tristan Moore	6 ft 7 in (2.01 m)	198 lb (90 kg)	Jr	Albuquerque, New Mexico
G	14	Nathan Self	6 ft 3 in (1.91 m)	187 lb (85 kg)	RS So	Houston, Texas
F	20	Chigozie Achara	6 ft 8 in (2.03 m)	215 lb (98 kg)	Sr	Palmdale, California
F	21	Nate Hudson	6 ft 6 in (1.98 m)	230 lb (104 kg)	Sr	Philadelphia, Pennsylvania
G	24	Jake Arnold	6 ft 2 in (1.88 m)	205 lb (93 kg)	So	Katy, Texas
G	25	Braden Bostwick	6 ft 3 in (1.91 m)	165 lb (75 kg)	RS Fr	Cleveland, Texas
F	33	Michael Imaraigbe	6 ft 7 in (2.01 m)	215 lb (98 kg)	Jr	Houston, Texas

Head coach

- Ron Cottrell (Arkansas)

Assistant coach(es)

- Jud Kinne (Albion)
- Terry Johnson (California State Stanislaus)
- Dee Wallace (California State Bakersfield)

Legend

- (C) Team captain
- (S) Suspended
- (I) Ineligible
- (W) Walk-on
- Injured
- Current redshirt

Roster

== Schedule and results ==
Date time, TV	Rank^{#}	Opponent^{#}	Result	Record	High points	High rebounds	High assists	Site (attendance) city, state
Non-conference Regular season
Nov 6, 2023*; 8:00 pm, ESPN+		at BYU	L 63–110	0–1	18 – M. Greene	6 – Tied (2)	4 – P. Bazil	Marriott Center (13,130); Provo, UT
Nov 15, 2023*; 7:00 pm, ESPN+		FIU	L 74–83	0–2	16 – P. Bazil	11 – B. Maring	11 – B. Maring	Sharp Gymnasium (609); Houston, TX
Nov 20, 2023*; 7:00 pm, ESPN+		UTSA	L 87–89	0–3	18 – M. Greene	11 – M. Imariagbe	3 – B. Maring	Sharp Gymnasium (804); Houston, TX
Nov 24, 2023*; 7:00 pm, ESPN+		at Oklahoma State	L 65–92	0–4	16 – M. Greene	10 – B. Maring	3 – B. Maring	Gallagher-Iba Arena (6,153); Stillwater, OK
Nov 27, 2023*; 7:00 pm, ESPN+		TCU	L 64–101	0–5	21 – J. Alvarez	11 – B. Maring	7 – M. Greene	Schollmaier Arena (5,505); Fort Worth, TX
Dec 2, 2023*; 4:00 pm, ESPN+		at Rice	L 56–65	0–6	17 – M. Greene	8 – M. Greene	4 – M. Greene	Tudor Fieldhouse (1,730); Houston, TX
Dec 6, 2023*; 7:00 pm, ESPN+		Southwestern Adventist	W 95–58	1–6	21 – J. Alvarez	13 – M. Imariagbe	7 – M. Greene	Sharp Gymnasium (414); Houston, TX
Dec 9, 2023*; 2:00 pm, LHN		at No. 12 Texas	L 50–77	1–7	15 – M. Greene	13 – B. Maring	2 – Tied (2)	Moody Center (10,418); Austin, TX
Dec 16, 2023*; 7:00 pm, ESPN+		Champion Christian	W 107–72	2–7	26 – M. Imariagbe	21 – M. Imariagbe	4 – M. Imariagbe	Sharp Gymnasium (391); Houston, TX
Dec 19, 2023*; 7:00 pm, ESPN+		at SMU	L 53–89	2–8	12 – Tied (2)	12 – M. Imariagbe	2 – Tied (3)	Moody Coliseum (4,331); Dallas, TX
Dec 22, 2023*; 7:00 pm, SECN		at Texas A&M	L 52–79	2–9	18 – M. Greene	6 – M. Imariagbe	4 – M. Greene	Reed Arena (5,475); College Station, TX
Southland Conference season
Jan 6, 2024; 3:30 pm, ESPN+		Nicholls	L 94–98 ^{OT}	2–10 (0–1)	22 – B. Maring	8 – M. Imariagbe	5 – M. Greene	Sharp Gymnasium (509); Houston, TX
Jan 8, 2024; 7:00 pm, ESPN+		at Texas A&M–Corpus Christi	L 59–81	2–11 (0–2)	13 – M. Imariagbe	6 – M. Imariagbe	2 – Tied (3)	American Bank Center (795); Corpus Christi, TX
Jan 13, 2024; 1:00 pm, ESPN+		at Texas A&M–Commerce	W 69–65	3–11 (1–2)	24 – J. Alvarez	15 – B. Maring	6 – J. Alvarez	The Field House (243); Commerce, TX
Jan 15, 2024; 6:30 pm, ESPN+		at Northwestern State	L 64–69	3–12 (1–3)	28 – J. Alvarez	10 – M. Imariagbe	4 – M. Greene	Prather Coliseum (498); Natchitoches, LA
Jan 20, 2024; 3:30 pm, ESPN+		Lamar	W 78–77	4–12 (2–3)	22 – M. Greene	11 – M. Imariagbe	4 – M. Greene	Sharp Gymnasium (500); Houston, TX
Jan 22, 2024; 7:00 pm, ESPN+		New Orleans	W 88–80	5–12 (3–3)	18 – 2 tied	10 – M. Imariagbe	3 – 3 tied	Sharp Gymnasium (709); Houston, TX
Jan 27, 2024; 5:00 pm, ESPN+		at Incarnate Word	L 75–79	5–13 (3–4)	21 – J. Alvarez	11 – M. Imariagbe	4 – J. Alavarez	McDermott Center (199); San Antonio, TX
Jan 29, 2024; 7:00 pm, ESPN+		Southeastern Louisiana	L 58–80	5–14 (3–5)	14 – B. Maring	7 – J. Alvarez	3 – B. Maring	Sharp Gymnasium (389); Houston, TX
Feb 3, 2024; 3:30 pm, ESPN+		at Nicholls	L 73–83	5–15 (3–6)	18 – M. Imariagbe	11 – M. Imariagbe	4 – J. Alvarez	Stopher Gymnasium (555); Thibodaux, LA
Feb 5, 2024; 7:00 pm, ESPN+		at New Orleans	L 58–84	5–16 (3–7)	19 – M. Imariagbe	11 – M. Imariagbe	2 – M. Greene	Lakefront Arena (782); New Orleans, LA
Feb 10, 2024; 3:30 pm, ESPN+		Incarnate Word	W 86–83	6–16 (4–7)	25 – J. Alvarez	9 – J. Alvarez	3 – M. Greene	Sharp Gymnasium (707); Houston, TX
Feb 12, 2024; 7:00 pm, ESPN+		McNeese	L 54–105	6–17 (4–8)	15 – M. Greene	10 – T. Moore	3 – B. Waring	Sharp Gymnasium (924); Houston, TX
Feb 17, 2024; 3:30 pm, ESPN+		at Southeastern Louisiana	L 78–81	6–18 (4–9)	19 – Tied (2)	9 – M. Imariagbe	5 – D. Capriotti	Pride Roofing University Center (579); Hammond, LA
Feb 24, 2024; 3:30 pm, ESPN+		Northwestern State	L 73–86	6–19 (4–10)	19 – M. Greene	7 – B. Maring	4 – B. Maring	Sharp Gymnasium (431); Houston, TX
Feb 26, 2024; 7:00 pm, ESPN+		Texas A&M–Corpus Christi	L 79–91	6–20 (4–11)	30 – M. Greene	6 – J. Alvarez	4 – M. Greene	Sharp Gymnasium (491); Houston, TX
Mar 2, 2024; 3:30 pm, ESPN+		Texas A&M–Commerce	L 85–98	6–21 (4–12)	23 – B. Maring	11 – M. Imariagbe	6 – M. Greene	Sharp Gymnasium (626); Houston, TX
Mar 4, 2024; 7:00 pm, ESPN+		at McNeese	L 69–87	6–22 (4–13)	23 – M. Greene	8 – Tied (2)	3 – M. Greene	The Legacy Center (3,373); Lake Charles, LA
Mar 6, 2024; 7:00 pm, ESPN+		at Lamar	L 68–78	6–23 (4–14)	17 – Tied (2)	13 – M. Imariagbe	3 – Tied (2)	Neches Arena (1,559); Beaumont, TX
*Non-conference game. ^{#}Rankings from AP Poll. (#) Tournament seedings in parentheses. All times are in Central.

== See also ==
- 2023–24 Houston Christian Huskies women's basketball team
