= 2023–24 Incarnate Word Cardinals men's basketball team =

2023–24 Incarnate Word Cardinals men's basketball
- Conference: Southland Conference
- Record: 8–23 (3–15 Southland)
- Head coach: Shane Heirman (1st season)
- Assistant coaches: Jaren Jackson, Sr. (1st season); Ben Lang (1st season); Shawn Ward (1st season); Robert Holloway (1st season)
- Home arena: McDermott Center (Capacity: 2,000)

2023–24 Southland Conference men's basketball standings
	Conf.				Overall
Team	W		L	PCT	W		L	PCT
McNeese †	17	–	1	.944	30	–	4	.882
Texas A&M–Corpus Christi	14	–	4	.778	21	–	12	.636
Nicholls	13	–	5	.722	20	–	14	.588
Lamar	12	–	6	.667	19	–	14	.576
Southeastern Louisiana	10	–	8	.556	15	–	17	.469
Northwestern State	7	–	11	.389	9	–	23	.281
Texas A&M–Commerce*	6	–	12	.333	13	–	20	.394
New Orleans	4	–	14	.222	10	–	23	.303
Houston Christian	4	–	14	.222	6	–	23	.207
Incarnate Word	3	–	15	.167	8	–	23	.258
† 2024 Southland tournament winner * ineligible for the 2024 NCAA tournament due to transition period

The 2023–24 Incarnate Word Cardinals men's basketball team represented the University of the Incarnate Word during the 2023–24 NCAA Division I men's basketball season. The Cardinals were led by first-year head coach Shane Heirman and played their home games at McDermott Convocation Center in San Antonio, Texas as members of the Southland Conference.

== Previous season ==
The Cardinals finished the season 12–19, 6–12 in Southland play to finish in ninth place. They failed to qualify for the Southland tournament.

On April 11, 2023, the school fired head coach Carson Cunningham. On May 5, the school named Central Michigan associate head coach Shane Heirman the team's new head coach.

== Preseason polls ==
=== Southland Conference Poll ===
The Southland Conference released its preseason poll on October 10, 2023. Receiving 42 votes overall, the Cardinals were picked to finish tenth in the conference.

Predicted finish	Team	Votes (1st place)
1	Southeastern Louisiana	144 (6)
2	McNeese	142 (6)
3	New Orleans	132 (3)
4	Texas A&M–Corpus Christi	124 (5)
5	Northwestern State	84
6	Nicholls	71
7	Texas A&M–Commerce	66
8	Houston Christian	50
9	Lamar	45
10	Incarnate Word	42

=== Preseason All Conference ===
No Incarnate Word players were selected as a member of the Preseason all conference team.

== Roster ==
2023–24 Incarnate Word Cardinals men's basketball team
Players
Coaches

Pos.	#	Name	Height	Weight	Year	Previous school	Hometown
G	00	Sky Wicks	6 ft 6 in (1.98 m)	190 lb (86 kg)	Jr	State College of Florida	Jersey City, NJ
F	1	Breno Silva	6 ft 8 in (2.03 m)	210 lb (95 kg)	Fr	NBA Academy	Joinville, Brazil
F	2	Lamin Sabally	6 ft 8 in (2.03 m)	205 lb (93 kg)	Jr	UTSA	Berlin, Germany
F	3	Davante Dennis	6 ft 7 in (2.01 m)	220 lb (100 kg)	RS So	Red Lion Area Senior HS	Baltimore, MD
G	4	Amani Drummond	6 ft 0 in (1.83 m)	170 lb (77 kg)	So	Central Michigan	Houston, TX
F	5	Dylan Hayman	6 ft 5 in (1.96 m)	211 lb (96 kg)	Jr	Healdsburg HS	Healdsburg, CA
G	9	Elijah Davis	—	—	Jr	Walters State CC	Baltimore, MD
G	10	Josiah Hammons	6 ft 2 in (1.88 m)	180 lb (82 kg)	Jr	Truman College	Chicago, IL
G	11	TJ Ford, Jr.	5 ft 11 in (1.8 m)	155 lb (70 kg)	Fr	Ridge Point HS	Houston, TX
F	12	Shon Robinson	6 ft 9 in (2.06 m)	225 lb (102 kg)	GS	Austin Peay	Chicago, IL
G	13	Josh Morgan	6 ft 3 in (1.91 m)	215 lb (98 kg)	Sr	Father Henry Carr Catholic Secondary School	Brampton, Ontario
G	14	Evan Santos	6 ft 1 in (1.85 m)	180 lb (82 kg)	GS	Alamo Heights HS	Alamo Heights, TX
F/C	23	Marcus Glover	—	—	So	Kirkwood CC	Chicago, IL
C	33	Gabe Beny Til	6 ft 8 in (2.03 m)	207 lb (94 kg)	So	Hurricane HS (WV)	South Sudan
C	35	Josh Akpovwa	6 ft 8 in (2.03 m)	235 lb (107 kg)	Fr	Seven Lakes HS	Houston, TX
G	55	Alex Anderson	6 ft 6 in (1.98 m)	200 lb (91 kg)	Jr	Alabama State	Memphis, TN

Head coach

- Shane Heirman (Tulsa)

Assistant coach(es)

- Jaren Jackson, Sr. (Georgetown)
- Shawn Ward (Incarnate Word)
- Ben Lang (DePaul)
- Robert Holloway (Eastern Illinois)

Legend

- (C) Team captain
- (S) Suspended
- (I) Ineligible
- (W) Walk-on
- Injured
- Current redshirt

Roster

== Schedule and results ==
Date time, TV	Opponent	Result	Record	High points	High rebounds	High assists	Site (attendance) city, state
Exhibition
November 2, 2023*; 7:00 pm	at Texas Lutheran	W 79–75		–	–	–	McDermott Center; San Antonio, TX
Non-conference regular season
November 6, 2023*; 7:00 pm, LHN	at No. 18 Texas	L 56–88	0–1	26 – Wicks	11 – Wicks	3 – Wicks	Moody Center (10,763); Austin, TX
November 11, 2023*; 2:00 pm, ESPN+	at Tulsa	L 71–85	0–2	22 – Hammons	12 – Robinson	5 – Davis	Reynolds Center (2,556); Tulsa, OK
November 14, 2023*; 12:00 pm, ESPN+	Schreiner University	W 104–63	1–2	29 – Wicks	14 – Wicks	6 – Davis	McDermott Center (201); San Antonio, TX
November 18, 2023*; 7:30 pm, ESPN+	at Arkansas–Pine Bluff	W 100–81	2–2	21 – Hammons	9 – Robinson	5 – Davis	K. L. Johnson Complex (1,152); Pine Bluff, AR
November 22, 2023*; 7:00 pm, ESPN+	Jacksonville State	W 67–66	3–2	21 – S. Wicks	5 – S. Robinson	3 – J. Hammons	McDermott Center (86); San Antonio, TX
November 25, 2023*; 3:00 pm, ESPN+	at UTSA; Roadrunner/Cardinal Classic	L 80–90	3–3	24 – S. Wicks	11 – S. Wicks	5 – S. Wicks	Convocation Center (916); San Antonio, TX
November 26, 2023*; 3:00 pm	vs. Jacksonville State; Roadrunner/Cardinal Classic	L 65–67	3–4	16 – E. Davis	7 – E. Davis	3 – E. Davis	Convocation Center; San Antonio, TX
December 1, 2023*; 7:00 pm, ESPN+	at Bethune–Cookman	L 82–96	3–5	21 – J. Morgan	9 – S. Wicks	4 – J. Morgan	Moore Gymnasium (704); Daytona Beach, FL
December 9, 2023*; 3:00 pm, ESPN+	Northern Arizona	L 75–76	3–6	28 – S. Wicks	8 – S. Robinson	6 – E. Davis	McDermott Center (58); San Antonio, TX
December 13, 2023*; 11:15 pm, ESPN+	at Rice	L 57–80	3–7	13 – J. Hammons	4 – S. Robinson	3 – E. Davis	Tudor Fieldhouse (3,466); Houston, TX
December 21, 2023*; 1:00 pm, ESPN+	at UIC	W 67–66	4–7	23 – J. Hammons	8 – A. Anderson	6 – A. Anderson	Credit Union 1 Arena (1,154); Chicago, IL
December 30, 2023*; 6:30 pm, ESPN+	at UTRGV	L 74–77	4–8	21 – S. Robinson	10 – S. Wicks	6 – A. Anderson	UTRGV Fieldhouse (718); Edinburg, TX
January 2, 2024*; 6:30 pm, ESPN+	Our Lady of the Lake	W 83–74	5–8	24 – J. Morgan	6 – Tied (3)	5 – A. Anderson	McDermott Center; San Antonio, TX
Southland regular season
January 6, 2024; 5:00 pm, ESPN+	Texas A&M–Corpus Christi	L 65–75	5–9 (0–1)	19 – J. Hammons	9 – S. Wicks	5 – E. Davis	McDermott Center (218); San Antonio, TX
January 8, 2024; 7:00 pm, ESPN+	at Lamar	L 59–75	5–10 (0–2)	16 – S. Robinson	10 – S. Robinson	4 – E. Davis	Neches Arena (781); Beaumont, TX
January 13, 2024; 3:00 pm, ESPN+	at Northwestern State	L 77–97	5–11 (0–3)	17 – S. Wicks	5 – S. Wicks	2 – E. Davis	Prather Coliseum (1,063); Natchitoches, LA
January 20, 2024; 5:00 pm, ESPN+	McNeese	L 66–80	5–12 (0–4)	26 – J. Hammons	6 – Tied (2)	3 – Tied (2)	McDermott Center (376); San Antonio, TX
January 22, 2024; 6:30 pm, ESPN+	Nicholls	L 74–78 ^{OT}	5–13 (0–5)	21 – A. Anderson	8 – S. Wicks	4 – A. Anderson	McDermott Center (135); San Antonio, TX
January 27, 2024; 5:00 pm, ESPN+	Houston Christian	W 79–75	6–13 (1–5)	17 – S. Wicks	11 – S. Wicks	6 – S. Wicks	McDermott Center (199); San Antonio, TX
January 31, 2024; 1:00 pm, ESPN+	at Texas A&M–Commerce	L 66–71	6–14 (1–6)	18 – D. Hayman	6 – S. Wicks	5 – E. Davis	The Field House (203); Commerce, TX
February 3, 2024; 4:00 pm, ESPN+	at New Orleans	W 82–80	7–14 (2–6)	27 – S. Wicks	15 – S. Wicks	6 – A. Anderson	Lakefront Arena (748); New Orleans, LA
February 5, 2024; 6:00 pm, ESPN+	at Southeastern Louisiana	L 64–76	7–15 (2–7)	15 – S. Wicks	6 – D. Dennis	7 – A. Anderson	Pride Roofing University Center (756); Hammond, LA
February 10, 2024; 3:30 pm, ESPN+	at Houston Christian	L 83–86	7–16 (2–8)	22 – J. Hammons	8 – D. Hayman	3 – E. Davis	Sharp Gymnasium (707); Houston, TX
February 12, 2024; 6:30 pm, ESPN+	Lamar	W 76–67	8–16 (3–8)	19 – S. Wicks	11 – S. Wicks	4 – D. Hayman	McDermott Center (204); San Antonio, TX
February 17, 2024; 5:00 pm, ESPN+	Northwestern State	L 61–81	8–17 (3–9)	20 – A. Anderson	7 – S. Wicks	2 – Tied (2)	McDermott Center (150); San Antonio, TX
February 19, 2024; 6:30 pm, ESPN+	Texas A&M–Commerce	L 72–76 ^{OT}	8–18 (3–10)	18 – J. Morgan	12 – D. Dennis	4 – A. Anderson	McDermott Center; San Antonio, TX
February 24, 2024; 4:00 pm, ESPN+	at McNeese	L 71–87	8–19 (3–11)	14 – T. Ford, Jr.	6 – D. Hayman	5 – T. Ford, Jr.	The Legacy Center (4,213); Lake Charles, LA
February 26, 2024; 6:30 pm, ESPN+	at Nicholls	L 82–92	8–20 (3–12)	22 – S. Wicks	14 – D. Dennis	4 – D. Hayman	Stopher Gymnasium (850); Thibodaux, LA
March 2, 2024; 5:00 pm, ESPN+	New Orleans	L 80–87	8–21 (3–13)	23 – J. Hammons	7 – D. Hayman	4 – T. Ford, Jr.	McDermott Center (151); San Antonio, TX
March 4, 2024; 6:30 pm, ESPN+	Southeastern Louisiana	L 56–73	8–22 (3–14)	17 – Tied (2)	7 – D. Hayman	8 – E. Davis	McDermott Center (146); San Antonio, TX
March 6, 2024; 7:30 pm, ESPN+	at Texas A&M–Corpus Christi	L 52–71	8–23 (3–15)	13 – Hammons	12 – Wicks	3 – Davis	American Bank Center (2,719); Corpus Christi, TX
*Non-conference game. ^{#}Rankings from AP Poll. (#) Tournament seedings in parentheses. All times are in Central Time.

== See also ==
- 2023–24 Incarnate Word Cardinals women's basketball team
