= 2023–24 Southeastern Louisiana Lions basketball team =

American college basketball season

2023–24 Southeastern Louisiana Lions basketball
- Conference: Southland Conference
- Record: 15–17 (10–8 Southland)
- Head coach: David Kiefer (5th season)
- Associate head coach: Kyle Roane
- Assistant coaches: Cody McCoy; Drew Riley
- Home arena: University Center (Capacity: 7,500)

2023–24 Southland Conference men's basketball standings
	Conf.				Overall
Team	W		L	PCT	W		L	PCT
McNeese †	17	–	1	.944	30	–	4	.882
Texas A&M–Corpus Christi	14	–	4	.778	21	–	12	.636
Nicholls	13	–	5	.722	20	–	14	.588
Lamar	12	–	6	.667	19	–	14	.576
Southeastern Louisiana	10	–	8	.556	15	–	17	.469
Northwestern State	7	–	11	.389	9	–	23	.281
Texas A&M–Commerce*	6	–	12	.333	13	–	20	.394
New Orleans	4	–	14	.222	10	–	23	.303
Houston Christian	4	–	14	.222	6	–	23	.207
Incarnate Word	3	–	15	.167	8	–	23	.258
† 2024 Southland tournament winner * ineligible for the 2024 NCAA tournament due to transition period

The 2023–24 Southeastern Louisiana Lions basketball team represented Southeastern Louisiana University in the 2023–24 NCAA Division I men's basketball season. The Lions, led by fifth-year head coach David Kiefer, played their home games at the University Center in Hammond, Louisiana as members of the Southland Conference.

The Lions finished the season 15–17 overall and 10–8 in Southland Conference play to finish fifth in conference. They lost against New Orleans in the first round.

== Previous season ==
The Lions finished the 2022–23 season 18–14 overall and 12–6 in Southland Conference play to finish third in conference. They lost against New Orleans in the second round.

== Preseason polls ==
=== Southland Conference Poll ===
The Southland Conference released its preseason poll on October 10, 2023. Receiving six first-place votes and 144 votes overall, the Lions were picked to finish first in the conference.

Predicted finish	Team	Votes (1st place)
1	Southeastern	144 (6)
2	McNeese	142 (6)
3	New Orleans	132 (3)
4	Texas A&M–Corpus Christi	124 (5)
5	Northwestern State	84
6	Nicholls	71
7	Texas A&M–Commerce	66
8	Houston Christian	50
9	Lamar	45
10	Incarnate Word	42

=== Preseason All Conference ===
Junior Roger McFarlane, a guard, was selected as a first-team member, senior Nick Caldwell, guard/forward and graduate Alec Woodard, a guard, were selected as second-team members of the preseason all-conference team.

== Roster ==
2023–24 Southeastern Louisiana Lions men's basketball team
Players
Coaches

Pos.	#	Name	Height	Weight	Year	Previous school	Hometown
G	0	Kam Burton	6 ft 3 in (1.91 m)	195 lb (88 kg)	Fr	Legacy the School of Sport Sciences	Houston, TX
G	1	Avery Wilson	6 ft 4 in (1.93 m)	225 lb (102 kg)	GS	Forest Park HS; Boston College	Forest Park, GA
G	2	Roscoe Eastmond	5 ft 9 in (1.75 m)	150 lb (68 kg)	Sr	Wheeler HS; Denver	Marietta, GA
G	3	Roger McFarlane	6 ft 5 in (1.96 m)	205 lb (93 kg)	Jr	University HS; Dodge City JC	Fort Lauderdale, FL
F	4	Jason Malbrue	6 ft 6 in (1.98 m)	215 lb (98 kg)	Fr	St. Augustine HS; New Mexico Highlands	New Orleans, LA
G	4	Tyrell Yates	6 ft 4 in (1.93 m)	180 lb (82 kg)	Fr	Northshore HS	Slidell, LA
G	8	Carlos Paez	5 ft 11 in (1.8 m)	175 lb (79 kg)	GS	Sunrise Christian Academy; Austin Peay	Naguanagua, Venezuela
F	10	Asher Boney	6 ft 6 in (1.98 m)	225 lb (102 kg)	Fr	Ponchatoula HS	Ponchatoula, LA
G	11	Anthony Bittar	6 ft 4 in (1.93 m)	200 lb (91 kg)	Jr	East Lake HS; Florida College	Oldsmar, FL
G	12	Joe Mpoyo	6 ft 5 in (1.96 m)	200 lb (91 kg)	Jr	Meridian HS; Dawson Community College	Kinshasa, Democratic Republic of the Congo
F	14	Dylan Canoville	6 ft 5 in (1.96 m)	220 lb (100 kg)	So	Calvary Christian Academy; Copiah–Lincoln Community College	Coral Springs, FL
F	15	Brody Rowbury	6 ft 11 in (2.11 m)	290 lb (132 kg)	So	Meridian HS; Sunrise Christian Academy	Meridian, ID
G	20	Alec Woodard	6 ft 2 in (1.88 m)	200 lb (91 kg)	GS	Morgan County HS; Austin Peay	Rutledge, GA
F	21	Dominic Commisso	6 ft 9 in (2.06 m)	185 lb (84 kg)	Fr	Hononegah Community HS; The Newman School	Roscoe, IL
G/F	22	Nick Caldwell	6 ft 7 in (2.01 m)	215 lb (98 kg)	Sr	Dutchtown HS	Prairieville, LA
C	33	Max Brackmann	7 ft 2 in (2.18 m)	270 lb (122 kg)	Jr	Staedtische Loehne	Löhne, Germany

Head coach

- David Kiefer (Kansas State)

Assistant coach(es)

- Kyle Roane (Southern Miss)
- Cody McCoy (UT Arlington)
- Drew Riley (Arkansas State)

Legend

- (C) Team captain
- (S) Suspended
- (I) Ineligible
- (W) Walk-on
- Injured
- Current redshirt

Roster
Last update: October 17, 2023

== Schedule and results ==
Date time, TV	Rank^{#}	Opponent^{#}	Result	Record	High points	High rebounds	High assists	Site (attendance) city, state
Non-conference regular season
November 6, 2023*; 6:00 p.m., ESPN+		Delta State	W 90–71	1–0	14 – R. McFarlane	8 – B. Rowbury	6 – C. Paez	University Center (1,021); Hammond, LA
November 10, 2023*; 7:00 p.m., SECN+/ESPN+		at Auburn	L 71–86	1–1	24 – R. McFarlane	11 – R. McFarlane	2 – Tied (2)	Neville Arena (9,1212); Auburn, AL
November 15, 2023*; 8:00 p.m., ESPN+		at BYU	L 48–105	1–2	14 – R. McFarlane	7 – R. McFarlane	4 – R. Eastmond	Marriott Center (13,116); Provo, UT
November 18, 2023*; 7:00 p.m., ESPN+		at Santa Clara; Emerald Coast Classic	L 63–65	1–3	17 – A. Woodard	9 – A. Woodard	5 – R. Eastmond	Leavey Center (1,198); Santa Clara, CA
November 24, 2023*; 1:30 p.m., FloHoops		vs. Western Michigan; Emerald Coast Classic	L 67–68	1–4	14 – D. Canoville	6 – N. Caldwell	5 – A. Wilson	The Arena at NFSC (450); Niceville, FL
November 25, 2023*; 10:00 a.m., FloHoops		vs. Tennessee State; Emerald Coast Classic	L 77–91	1–5	18 – R. McFarlane	7 – J. Jones	6 – J. Jones	The Arena at NFSC (150); Niceville, FL
November 28, 2023*; 6:00 p.m., ESPN+		Southern–New Orleans	W 101–55	2–5	23 – N. Caldwell	7 – R. McFarlane	7 – C. Paez	University Center (537); Hammond, LA
December 1, 2023*; 7:00 p.m., SECN+/ESPN+		at LSU	L 66–73	2–6	18 – N. Caldwell	8 – N. Caldwell	5 – R. Eastmond	Pete Maravich Assembly Center (7,365); Baton Rouge, LA
December 9, 2023*; 5:30 p.m.		at Southern	L 44–69	2–7	14 – N. Caldwell	8 – B. Rowbury	2 – R. McFarlane	F. G. Clark Center (2,190); Baton Rouge, LA
December 12, 2023*; 6:00 p.m., ESPN+		at Louisiana Tech	L 60–89	2–8	16 – A. Woodard	8 – B. Rowbury	6 – A. Bittar	Thomas Assembly Center (2,031); Ruston, LA
December 16, 2023*; 3:00 p.m., ESPN+		at Murray State	W 61–55	3–8	23 – N. Caldwell	9 – Tied (2)	4 – A. Woodard	CFSB Center (4,818); Murray, KY
December 20, 2023*; 6:00 p.m., ESPN+		Grambling	W 48–47	4–8	13 – R. McFarlane	9 – R. McFarlane	6 – R. Eastmond	University Center (443); Hammond, LA
December 30, 2023*; 2:00 p.m., ESPN+		Loyola (New Orleans)	W 87–64	5–8	17 – N. Caldwell	14 – R. McFarlane	13 – R. Eastmond	University Center (530); Hammond, LA
Southland Conference regular season
January 6, 2024; 4:00 p.m., ESPN+		at New Orleans	W 73–68	6–8 (1–0)	19 – B. Rowbury	10 – R. McFarlane	5 – R. Eastmond	Lakefront Arena (1,139); New Orleans, LA
January 9, 2024; 6:30 p.m., ESPN+		at Nicholls	L 61–66	6–9 (1–1)	20 – N. Caldwell	12 – R. McFarlane	11 – R. Eastmond	Stopher Gymnasium (500); Thibodaux, LA
January 13, 2024; 4:00 p.m., ESPN+		at McNeese	L 65–74	6–10 (1–2)	20 – A. Woodard	11 – R. McFarlane	7 – R. Eastmond	The Legacy Center (4,200); Lake Charles, LA
January 15, 2024; 6:00 p.m., ESPN+		Texas A&M–Corpus Christi	L 68–73	6–11 (1–3)	18 – R. McFarlane	8 – R. McFarlane	6 – R. Eastmond	University Center (407); Hammond, LA
January 20, 2024; 3:30 p.m., ESPN+		Texas A&M–Commerce	L 52–68	6–12 (1–4)	19 – R. McFarlane	8 – R. McFarlane	6 – R. Eastmond	University Center (673); Hammond, LA
January 22, 2024; 6:00 p.m., ESPN+		Northwestern State	W 71–62	7–12 (2–4)	21 – N. Caldwell	13 – R. McFarlane	3 – A. Woodard	University Center (658); Hammond, LA
January 27, 2024; 6:00 p.m., ESPN+		at Lamar	L 64–74	7–13 (2–5)	20 – R. McFarlane	12 – R. McFarlane	7 – R. Eastmond	Neches Arena (2,433); Beaumont, TX
January 29, 2024; 7:00 p.m., ESPN+		at Houston Christian	W 80–58	8–13 (3–5)	26 – N. Caldwell	13 – B. Rowbury	12 – R. Eastmond	Sharp Gymnasium (389); Houston, TX
February 3, 2024; 3:30 p.m., ESPN+		McNeese	W 77–74	9–13 (4–5)	16 – N. Caldwell	8 – N. Caldwell	5 – R. Eastmond	University Center (1,043); Hammond, LA
February 5, 2024; 6:00 p.m., ESPN+		Incarnate Word	W 76–64	10–13 (5–5)	18 – Tied (2)	7 – Tied (2)	13 – R. Eastmond	University Center (756); Hammond, LA
February 10, 2024; 3:00 p.m., ESPN+		at Northwestern State	W 69–59	11–13 (6–5)	15 – N. Caldwell	10 – R. McFarlane	7 – R. Eastmond	Prather Coliseum (1,000); Natchitoches, LA
February 12, 2024; 7:00 p.m., ESPN+		at Texas A&M–Commerce	W 79–77 ^{OT}	12–13 (7–5)	22 – N. Caldwell	15 – R. McFarlane	8 – R. Eastmond	The Field House (309); Commerce, TX
February 17, 2024; 3:30 p.m., ESPN+		Houston Christian	W 81–78	13–13 (8–5)	24 – N. Caldwell	10 – N. Caldwell	15 – R. Eastmond	University Center (579); Hammond, LA
February 19, 2024; 6:00 p.m., ESPN+		Lamar	L 72–77 ^{OT}	13–14 (8–6)	30 – N. Caldwell	12 – N. Caldwell	7 – R. Eastmond	University Center (528); Hammond, LA
February 24, 2024; 3:30 p.m., ESPN+		New Orleans	W 77–67	14–14 (9–6)	22 – N. Caldwell	17 – R. McFarlane	8 – R. Eastmond	University Center (929); Hammond, LA
March 2, 2024; 4:30 p.m., ESPN+		at Texas A&M–Corpus Christi	L 68–80	14–15 (9–7)	22 – R. McFarlane	8 – R. McFarlane	8 – R. Eastmond	American Bank Center (2,848); Corpus Christi, TX
March 4, 2024; 6:30 p.m., ESPN+		at Incarnate Word	W 73–56	15–15 (10–7)	20 – B. Rowbury	12 – R. McFarlane	8 – R. Eastmond	McDermott Center (146); San Antonio, TX
March 7, 2024; 7:30 p.m., ESPN+		Nicholls	L 54–80	15–16 (10–8)	12 – McFarlane	6 – McFarlane	3 – Eastmond	University Center (935); Hammond, LA
Southland tournament
March 10, 2024; 5:00 p.m., ESPN+	(5)	vs. (8) New Orleans; First round	L 66–78	15–17	18 – R. McFarlane	8 – R. McFarlane	8 – R. Eastmond	The Legacy Center; Lake Charles, LA
*Non-conference game. ^{#}Rankings from AP poll. (#) Tournament seedings in parentheses. All times are in Central.

== Conference awards and honors ==
=== Weekly awards ===
Weekly honors
Honors	Player	Position	Date awarded	Ref.
SLC Men's Basketball Player of the Week	Roscoe Eastmond	G	February 5, 2024	
SLC Men's Basketball Player of the Week	Nick Caldwell	F	February 12, 2024	
SLC Men's Basketball Player of the Week	Nick Caldwell	F	February 19, 2024	

== See also ==
- 2023–24 Southeastern Louisiana Lady Lions basketball team
