= 2023–24 Lamar Cardinals basketball team =

American college basketball season

2023–24 Lamar Cardinals basketball
- Conference: Southland Conference
- Record: 19–14 (12–6 Southland)
- Head coach: Alvin Brooks (3rd season)
- Assistant coaches: Charles Harral (3rd season); Wendell Moore (3rd season); Mikhail McClean (3rd season)
- Home arena: Neches Federal Credit Union Arena at the Montagne Center (Capacity: 10,080)

2023–24 Southland Conference men's basketball standings
	Conf.				Overall
Team	W		L	PCT	W		L	PCT
McNeese †	17	–	1	.944	30	–	4	.882
Texas A&M–Corpus Christi	14	–	4	.778	21	–	12	.636
Nicholls	13	–	5	.722	20	–	14	.588
Lamar	12	–	6	.667	19	–	14	.576
Southeastern Louisiana	10	–	8	.556	15	–	17	.469
Northwestern State	7	–	11	.389	9	–	23	.281
Texas A&M–Commerce*	6	–	12	.333	13	–	20	.394
New Orleans	4	–	14	.222	10	–	23	.303
Houston Christian	4	–	14	.222	6	–	23	.207
Incarnate Word	3	–	15	.167	8	–	23	.258
† 2024 Southland tournament winner * ineligible for the 2024 NCAA tournament due to transition period

The 2023–24 Lamar Cardinals basketball team represented Lamar University during the 2023–24 NCAA Division I men's basketball season. The Cardinals were led by third-year head coach Alvin Brooks and played their home games at the Neches Federal Credit Union Arena at the Montagne Center in Beaumont, Texas. They finished the season 19–14 overall and 12–6 in Southland Conference play for a fourth-place conference finish. As the fourth-seeded team, the Cardinals were 1–1 in the SLC tournament defeating eighth-seeded New Orleans 71–57 and losing to top-seeded McNeese 57–76 in the semifinal round.

== Previous season ==
The Cardinals finished the 2022–23 season 9–22 overall and 5–13 in Southland Conference play to finish last in the conference. The Cardinals failed to qualify for the SLC tournament.

== Offseason ==
=== Incoming transfers ===
Lamar incoming transfers
Name	Number	Pos.	Height	Weight	Year	Hometown	Previous school
Ja'Sean Jackson	11	G	6' 0"	170	Junior	San Antonio, TX	Abilene Christian
B.B. Knight	8	G	6' 6"	189	Sophomore	Katy, TX	Tulsa
Errol White	10	F	6' 7"	205	Junior	Queens, NY	Eastern New Mexico

=== Incoming recruits ===
Lamar incoming recruits
Name	Number	Pos.	Height	Weight	Year	Hometown	Previous school
Jayden Barrs	2	G	6' 1"	190	Freshman	Manor, TX	Manor High School
Aleksa Lekic	15	C	6' 10"	195	Freshman	Montenegro	KK Buducnost VOLI
Javon Murray	33	F	6' 4"	225	Freshman	League City, TX	Clear Falls High School

== Preseason polls ==
=== Southland Conference Poll ===
The Southland Conference released its preseason poll on October 10, 2023. Receiving 45 votes overall, the Cardinals were picked to finish ninth in the conference.

Predicted finish	Team	Votes (1st place)
1	Southeastern	144 (6)
2	McNeese	142 (6)
3	New Orleans	132 (3)
4	Texas A&M–Corpus Christi	124 (5)
5	Northwestern State	84
6	Nicholls	71
7	Texas A&M–Commerce	66
8	Houston Christian	50
9	Lamar	45
10	Incarnate Word	42

=== Preseason All Conference ===
No Cardinals were selected as members of a preseason all-conference team.

== Roster ==
2023–24 Lamar Cardinals men's basketball team
Players
Coaches

Pos.	#	Name	Height	Weight	Year	Hometown
F	0	Cody Pennebaker	6 ft 5 in (1.96 m)	187 lb (85 kg)	So	Beaumont, TX
G	1	Brian Gordon	6 ft 2 in (1.88 m)	193 lb (88 kg)	So	Houston, TX
G	2	Jayden Barrs	6 ft 1 in (1.85 m)	190 lb (86 kg)	Fr	Manor, TX
G	3	Jakevion Buckley	6 ft 0 in (1.83 m)	162 lb (73 kg)	Jr	Shelbyville, TX
G	4	Chris Pryor	5 ft 11 in (1.8 m)	152 lb (69 kg)	Sr	Desoto, TX
F	5	Terry Anderson	6 ft 6 in (1.98 m)	190 lb (86 kg)	Jr	Deer Park, TX
G	8	BB Knight	6 ft 6 in (1.98 m)	189 lb (86 kg)	So	Katy, TX
F	10	Errol White	6 ft 7 in (2.01 m)	205 lb (93 kg)	Jr	Queens, NY
F	11	Ja'Sean Jackson	6 ft 0 in (1.83 m)	170 lb (77 kg)	Jr	San Antonio, TX
C	12	Valentin Catt	6 ft 10 in (2.08 m)	232 lb (105 kg)	Jr	Orangefield, TX
C	15	Aleksa Lekic	6 ft 10 in (2.08 m)	—	Fr	Montenegro
C	20	Adam Hamilton	6 ft 9 in (2.06 m)	210 lb (95 kg)	Sr	Buckeye, AZ
G	23	Max Pearcy	6 ft 1 in (1.85 m)	170 lb (77 kg)	So	Woodbine, MD
F	32	Janko Bulajic	6 ft 10 in (2.08 m)	230 lb (104 kg)	So	Nikšić, Montenegro
F	33	Javon Murray	6 ft 4 in (1.93 m)	225 lb (102 kg)	Fr	League City, TX

Head coach

- Alvin Brooks (Lamar)

Assistant coach(es)

- Charles Harral (Texas Tech)
- Wendell Moore (Georgia Southern)
- Mikhail McClean (Houston)

Legend

- (C) Team captain
- (S) Suspended
- (I) Ineligible
- (W) Walk-on
- Injured
- Current redshirt

Roster
Last update: October 16, 2023

== Schedule and results ==
Date time, TV	Rank^{#}	Opponent^{#}	Result	Record	High points	High rebounds	High assists	Site (attendance) city, state
Exhibition
November 1, 2023*; 7:00 p.m., –		St. Thomas (TX)	W 71–70 ^{OT}	–	–	–	–	Neches Arena; Beaumont, TX
Non-conference regular season
November 6, 2023*; 7:00 p.m., ESPN+		Jarvis Christian	W 114–66	1–0	19 – B.B. Knight	9 – tied (2)	5 – T. Anderson	Neches Arena (1,617); Beaumont, TX
November 9, 2023*; 7:00 p.m., ESPN+		at SMU	L 67–78	1–1	13 – C. Pennebaker	7 – C. Pennebaker	3 – tied (4)	Moody Coliseum (4,057); Dallas, TX
November 14, 2023*; 7:00 p.m., ESPN+		UTSA	W 90–82	2–1	20 – T. Anderson	14 – A. Hamilton	5 – J. Jackson	Neches Arena (3,264); Beaumont, TX
November 18, 2023*; 4:00 p.m., ESPN+		at Pacific	L 76–77	2–2	22 – C. Pennebaker	12 – A. Hamilton	4 – tied (3)	Alex G. Spanos Center (391); Stockton, CA
November 24, 2023; 5:00 p.m., ESPN+		vs. Bethune–Cookman; Longwood MTE	W 83–65	3–2	19 – C. Pryor	11 – T. Anderson	3 – C. Pryor	Joan Perry Brock Center (205); Farmville, VA
November 25, 2023; 2:00 p.m., ESPN+		at Longwood; Longwood MTE	L 72–83	3–3	21 – B. Knight	9 – J. Bulajic	4 – J. Buckley	Joan Perry Brock Center (100); Farmville, VA
November 26, 2023; 12:00 p.m., ESPN+		at Delaware State; Longwood MTE	W 84–81 ^{OT}	4–3	18 – T. Anderson	10 – A. Hamilton	4 – A. Hamilron	Joan Perry Brock Center (427); Farmville, VA
November 30, 2023*; 8:00 p.m., ESPN+		at UTSA	L 83–86	4–4	17 – T. Anderson	10 – A. Hamilton	4 – C. Pryor	Convocation Center (1,535); San Antonio, TX
December 3, 2023*; 5:00 p.m., ESPN+		at Sam Houston	L 70–90	4–5	13 – A. Hamilton	6 – J. Bulajic	5 – C. Pryor	Bernard Johnson Coliseum (794); Huntsville, TX
December 14, 2023*; 7:00 p.m., ESPN+		Louisiana–Monroe	W 97–73	5–5	19 – B. Knight	8 – C. Pryor	6 – C. Pryor	Neches Arena (1,014); Beaumont, TX
December 18, 2023*; 7:00 p.m., ESPN+		Southern Miss	L 79–82	5–6	16 – tied (2)	7 – A. Hamilton	7 – J. Buckley	Neches Arena (1,122); Beaumont, TX
December 21, 2023*; 8:00 p.m., SECN		at LSU	L 66–87	5–7	14 – J. Jackson	7 – A. Hamilton	3 – C. Pryor	Pete Maravich Assembly Center (7,388); Baton Rouge, LA
December 30, 2023*; 6:00 p.m., ESPN+		Paul Quinn	W 91–64	6–7	15 – tied (2)	12 – J. Bulajic	5 – J. Buckley	Neches Arena (1,233); Beaumont, TX
Southland regular season
January 6, 2024; 6:00 p.m., ESPN+		Northwestern State	W 90–70	7–7 (1–0)	18 – A. Hamilton	12 – A. Hamilton	7 – C. Pryor	Neches Arena (2,768); Beaumont, TX
January 8, 2024; 7:00 p.m., ESPN+		Incarnate Word	W 75–59	8–7 (2–0)	19 – B. Knight	9 – A. Hamilton	5 – T. Anderson	Neches Arena (781); Beaumont, TX
January 13, 2024; 3:00 p.m., ESPN+		at Nicholls	W 78–76 ^{OT}	9–7 (3–0)	25 – T. Anderson	6 – C. Pennebaker	6 – C. Pryor	Stopher Gymnasium (800); Thibodaux, LA
January 15, 2024; 7:00 p.m., ESPN+		at McNeese; Battle of the Border (rivalry)	L 69–88	9–8 (3–1)	19 – C. Pryor	8 – T. Anderson	4 – C. Pryor	The Legacy Center (3,487); Lake Charles, LA
January 20, 2024; 3:30 p.m., ESPN+		at Houston Christian	L 77–78	9–9 (3–2)	18 – C. Pryor	8 – A. Hamilton	5 – T. Anderson	Sharp Gymnasium (500); Houston, TX
January 22, 2024; 7:00 p.m., ESPN+		Texas A&M–Commerce	W 76–65	10–9 (4–2)	18 – tied (2)	14 – T. Anderson	3 – tied (2)	Neches Arena (1,454); Beaumont, TX
January 27, 2024; 6:00 p.m., ESPN+		Southeastern Louisiana	W 74–64	11–9 (5–2)	17 – C. Pryor	7 – A. Hamilton	4 – T. Anderson	Neches Arena (2,433); Beaumont, TX
January 29, 2024; 7:00 p.m., ESPN+		New Orleans	W 98–73	12–9 (6–2)	23 – B. Knight	9 – E. White	6 – C. Pryor	Neches Arena (1,243); Beaumont, TX
February 3, 2024; 3:30 p.m., ESPN+		at Texas A&M–Corpus Christi	L 71–79	12–10 (6–3)	20 – T. Anderson	11 – T. Anderson	2 – T. Anderson	American Bank Center (2,465); Corpus Christi, TX
February 10, 2024; 6:00 p.m., ESPN+		Nicholls	W 75–56	13–10 (7–3)	15 – J. Buckley	8 – A. Hamilton	7 – J. Buckley	Neches Arena (2,353); Beaumont, TX
February 12, 2024; 6:30 p.m., ESPN+		at Incarnate Word	L 67–76	13–11 (7–4)	22 – T. Anderson	9 – E White	4 – J. Buckley	McDermott Center (204); San Antonio, TX
February 17, 2024; 4:00 p.m., ESPN+		at New Orleans	W 94–72	14–11 (8–4)	17 – A. Hamilton	10 – T. Anderson	10 – C. Pryor	Lakefront Arena (792); New Orleans, LA
February 19, 2024; 6:00 p.m., ESPN+		at Southeastern Louisiana	W 77–72 ^{OT}	15–11 (9–4)	19 – T. Anderson	9 – T. Anderson	7 – T. Anderson	Pride Roofing University Center (528); Hammond, LA
February 24, 2024; 6:00 p.m., ESPN+		Texas A&M–Corpus Christi	L 61–75	15–12 (9–5)	15 – J. Buckley	9 – T. Anderson	2 – T. Buckley	Neches Arena (3,176); Beaumont, TX
February 26, 2024; 7:00 p.m., ESPN+		McNeese; Battle of the Border (rivalry)	L 56–58	15–13 (9–6)	10 – A. Hamilton	13 – A. Hamilton	4 – J. Buckley	Neches Arena (3,844); Beaumont, TX
March 2, 2024; 3:00 p.m., ESPN+		at Northwestern State	W 82–77 ^{OT}	16–13 (10–6)	19 – B. Knight	10 – A. Hamilton	7 – C. Pryor	Prather Coliseum (1,127); Natchitoches, LA
March 4, 2024; 7:00 p.m., ESPN+		at Texas A&M–Commerce	W 70–53	17–13 (11–6)	19 – B.B. Knight	11 – T. Anderson	7 – T. Anderson	The Field House (329); Commerce, TX
March 6, 2024; 7:00 p.m., ESPN+		Houston Christian	W 78–68	18–13 (12–6)	21 – T. Anderson	9 – A. Hamilton	3 – tied (2)	Neches Arena (1,559); Beaumont, TX
Southland tournament
March 11, 2024; 5:00 p.m., ESPN+	(4)	vs. (8) New Orleans; Second round	W 71–57	19–13	20 – T. Anderson	8 – T. Anderson	8 – C. Pryor	The Legacy Center; Lake Charles, LA
March 12, 2024; 5:30 p.m., ESPNU	(4)	at (1) McNeese; Semifinals	L 57–76	19–14	16 – T. Anderson	9 – E. White	2 – tied (5)	The Legacy Center (4,200); Lake Charles, LA
*Non-conference game. ^{#}Rankings from AP poll. (#) Tournament seedings in parentheses. All times are in Central.

== Conference awards and honors ==
=== Weekly awards ===
Weekly honors
Honors	Player	Position	Date awarded	Ref.
SLC Men's Basketball Player of the Week	Adam Hamilton	C	November 20, 2023	
SLC Men's Basketball Player of the Week	Terry Anderson	F	March 8, 2024	

== See also ==
- 2023–24 Lamar Lady Cardinals basketball team
