= 2024 Southland Conference men's basketball tournament =

American college basketball tournament

- Classification: Division I
- Season: 2023–24
- Teams: 8
- Site: The Legacy Center; Lake Charles, Louisiana
- Champions: McNeese (3rd title)
- Winning coach: Will Wade (1st title)
- MVP: Shahada Wells (McNeese)
- Attendance: 9,357 (total); 4,200 (championship)
- Television: ESPN+, ESPNU, ESPN2

2023–24 Southland Conference men's basketball standings
	Conf.				Overall
Team	W		L	PCT	W		L	PCT
McNeese †	17	–	1	.944	30	–	4	.882
Texas A&M–Corpus Christi	14	–	4	.778	21	–	12	.636
Nicholls	13	–	5	.722	20	–	14	.588
Lamar	12	–	6	.667	19	–	14	.576
Southeastern Louisiana	10	–	8	.556	15	–	17	.469
Northwestern State	7	–	11	.389	9	–	23	.281
Texas A&M–Commerce*	6	–	12	.333	13	–	20	.394
New Orleans	4	–	14	.222	10	–	23	.303
Houston Christian	4	–	14	.222	6	–	23	.207
Incarnate Word	3	–	15	.167	8	–	23	.258
† 2024 Southland tournament winner * ineligible for the 2024 NCAA tournament due to transition period

The 2024 Southland Conference men's basketball tournament was the postseason men's basketball tournament for the 2023–24 season of the Southland Conference. The tournament was held March 10–13, 2024, at The Legacy Center in Lake Charles, Louisiana. The tournament winner, McNeese, received the conference's automatic invitation to the 2024 NCAA Division I men's basketball tournament.

== Seeds ==
Teams were seeded by record within the conference, with a tie–breaker system to seed teams with identical conference records. Eight teams in the conference qualified for the tournament. The top two seeds received double byes into the semifinals in the merit-based format. The No. 3 and No. 4 seeds received single byes to the quarterfinals. Tiebreakers used were 1) Head-to-head results, 2) comparison of records against individual teams in the conference starting with the top-ranked team(s) and working down and 3) NCAA NET rankings available on day following the conclusion of regular-season play.

Seed	School	Conference	Tiebreaker
1	McNeese	17–1	
2	Texas A&M–Corpus Christi	14–4	
3	Nicholls	13–5	
4	Lamar	12–6	
5	Southeastern Louisiana	10–8	
6	Northwestern State	7–11	
7	Texas A&M–Commerce	6–12	
8	New Orleans	4–14	1–1 vs. Texas A&M–Corpus Christi
DNQ	Houston Christian	4–14	0–2 vs. Texas A&M–Corpus Christi
DNQ	Incarnate Word	3–15	

== Schedule ==
Session	Game	Time*	Matchup^{#}	Score	Television	Attendance
First round – Sunday March 10, 2024
1	1	5:00 pm	No. 5 Southeastern Louisiana vs. No. 8 New Orleans	66–78	ESPN+	687
1	2	7:30 pm	No. 6 Northwestern State vs. No. 7 Texas A&M–Commerce	64–69	ESPN+	687
Second round – Monday, March 11, 2024
2	3	5:00 pm	No. 4 Lamar vs. No. 8 New Orleans	71–57	ESPN+	270
2	4	7:30 pm	No. 3 Nicholls vs. No. 7 Texas A&M-Commerce	72–51	ESPN+	270
Semifinals – Tuesday, March 12, 2024
3	5	5:30 pm	No. 1 McNeese vs. No. 4 Lamar	76–57	ESPNU	4,200
3	6	8:00 pm	No. 2 Texas A&M–Corpus Christi vs. No. 3 Nicholls	73–81^{OT}	ESPN+	4,200
Championship – Wednesday, March 13, 2024
4	7	4:00 pm	No. 1 McNeese vs. No. 3 Nicholls	92–76	ESPN2	4,200
*Game times in CDT. #-Rankings denote tournament seeding.

== Bracket ==
First round Sunday, March 10; ESPN+
5	Southeastern Louisiana	66
8	New Orleans	78
6	Northwestern State	64
7	Texas A&M–Commerce	69

Second round Monday, March 11; ESPN+
4	Lamar	71
8	New Orleans	57
3	Nicholls	72
7	Texas A&M–Commerce	51

Semifinals; Tuesday, March 12; ESPNU/ESPN+
1	McNeese	76
4	Lamar	57
2	Texas A&M–Corpus Christi	73
3	Nicholls	81*

Championship; Wednesday March 13; ESPN2
1	McNeese	92
3	Nicholls	76

* denotes number of overtime periods

=== First round ===
ESPN+

March 10
5:00 pm

Report

Southeastern Louisiana 66, New Orleans 78
Scoring by half: 33–39, 33–39
Pts: R. McFarlane – 18; Rebs: R. McFarland – 8 Asts: R. Eastmond – 8	Pts: J. Johnson – 34; Rebs: J. Glisson III – 10; Asts: K. Wilson-Rouse – 5

The Legacy Center – Lake Charles, LA
Referees: Garrett Theriot, Jeff Malham, Amy Bonner

ESPN+

March 10
7:30 pm

Report

Northwestern State 64, Texas A&M–Commerce 69
Scoring by half: 26–33, 43–31
Pts: J. Wilson – 20; Rebs: J. Wilson – 9 Asts: C. Forte – 3	Pts: K. Williams – 19; Rebs: K. Abdul-Mateen – 8 Asts: T. Lewis – 3

The Legacy Center – Lake Charles, LA
Attendance: 687
Referees: Jon Stigliano, Gerald Williams, Rodrick Dixon

=== Second round ===
ESPN+

March 11
5:00 pm

Report

Lamar 71, New Orleans 57
Scoring by half: 34–25, 37–32
Pts: T. Anderson – 20; Rebs: T. Anderson – 8 Asts: C. Pryor – 8	Pts: K. Wilson-Rouse – 10; Rebs: K. Wilson-Rouse – 6 Asts: K. Wilson-Rouse – 2

The Legacy Center – Lake Charles, LA
Referees: Darren George, Danny Chance, Joe Wilbert III

ESPN+

March 11
7:30 pm

Report

Nicholls 72, Texas A&M–Commerce 51
Scoring by half: 34–21, 38–30
Pts: R. Brown III – 18; Rebs: D. Smith – 7 Asts: Q. Strander – 5	Pts: A. Dodd – 15; Rebs: K. Williams – 8 Asts: T. Lewis – 3

The Legacy Center – Lake Charles, LA
Attendance: 270
Referees: Danny Chance, Steve Orkus, Jr., Brent Dugas

=== Semifinals ===
ESPNU

March 12
5:30 pm

Report

McNeese 76, Lamar 57
Scoring by half: 39–24, 37–33
Pts: S. Wells – 27; Rebs: C. Shumate – 7 Asts: S. Wells – 5	Pts: T. Anderson – 16; Rebs: E. White – 9 Asts: Tied (5 players) – 2

The Legacy Center – Lake Charles, LA
Attendance: 4,200
Referees: Joe Wilbert III, Danny Chance, Brent Dugas

ESPN+

March 12
8:00 pm

Repor

Texas A&M–Corpus Christi 73, Nicholls 81 (OT)
Scoring by half: 30–35, 39–34 Overtime: 4–12
Pts: G. Clark – 17; Rebs: D. Prim – 7 Asts: M. Humphrey – 6	Pts: M. Gray, Jr. – 23; Rebs: M. Gray, Jr. – 9 Asts: M. Gray, Jr. – 5

The Legacy Center – Lake Charles, LA
Attendance: 4,200
Referees: Gerald Williams, Garrett Theriot, Jeff Malham

=== Championship ===
ESPN2

March 13
4:00 pm

McNeese vs. Nicholls

The Legacy Center – Lake Charles, LA

== Awards and honors ==
2024 Southland Conference Men's Basketball All-Tournament Team
- Shahada Wells, McNeese (MVP)
- Javohn Garcia, McNeese
- DJ Richards, McNeese
- Diante Smith, Nicholls
- Terry Anderson, Lamar

== See also ==
2024 Southland Conference women's basketball tournament
