= 2023–24 Texas A&M–Commerce Lions men's basketball team =

American college basketball season

2023–24 Texas A&M–Commerce Lions men's basketball
- Conference: Southland Conference
- Record: 13–20 (6–12 Southland)
- Head coach: Jaret von Rosenberg (7th season)
- Assistant coaches: Coleman Furst; Yolonzo Moore; A.J. Holland
- Home arena: Texas A&M–Commerce Field House

2023–24 Southland Conference men's basketball standings
	Conf.				Overall
Team	W		L	PCT	W		L	PCT
McNeese †	17	–	1	.944	30	–	4	.882
Texas A&M–Corpus Christi	14	–	4	.778	21	–	12	.636
Nicholls	13	–	5	.722	20	–	14	.588
Lamar	12	–	6	.667	19	–	14	.576
Southeastern Louisiana	10	–	8	.556	15	–	17	.469
Northwestern State	7	–	11	.389	9	–	23	.281
Texas A&M–Commerce*	6	–	12	.333	13	–	20	.394
New Orleans	4	–	14	.222	10	–	23	.303
Houston Christian	4	–	14	.222	6	–	23	.207
Incarnate Word	3	–	15	.167	8	–	23	.258
† 2024 Southland tournament winner * ineligible for the 2024 NCAA tournament due to transition period

The 2023–24 Texas A&M–Commerce Lions men's basketball team represented Texas A&M University–Commerce in the 2023–24 NCAA Division I men's basketball season. The Lions, led by sixth-year head coach Jaret von Rosenberg, played their home games at Texas A&M–Commerce Field House in Commerce, Texas, as members of the Southland Conference.

This season marked Texas A&M–Commerce's second year of an originally scheduled four-year transition period from Division II to Division I. As a result, the Lions will not be eligible for NCAA postseason play until the 2026–27 season. However, the Division I Council is preparing to vote on a proposal to shorten the period for such a transition to three years. Should the proposal be approved in January 2025, the Lions would be eligible in 2025–26.

This was also the final full season for the university under its then-current identity. On November 7, 2024, after the Lions had played their first two games of the 2024–25 season, the Texas A&M University System Board of Regents approved the proposed change of the university's name to East Texas A&M University. The name change took effect immediately.

== Preseason polls ==
=== Southland Conference Poll ===
The Southland Conference (SLC) released its preseason poll on October 10, 2023. Receiving 66 votes overall, the Lions were picked to finish seventh in the conference.

Predicted finish	Team	Votes (1st place)
1	Southeastern	144 (6)
2	McNeese	142 (6)
3	New Orleans	132 (3)
4	Texas A&M–Corpus Christi	124 (5)
5	Northwestern State	84
6	Nicholls	71
7	Texas A&M–Commerce	66
8	Houston Christian	50
9	Lamar	45
10	Incarnate Word	42

=== Preseason All Conference ===
Jerome Brewer Jr., forward was selected as a Preseason All-Conference second team member.

== Roster ==
2023–24 Texas A&M-Commerce Lions men's basketball team
Players
Coaches

Pos.	#	Name	Height	Weight	Year	Hometown
F	0	Zondrick Garrett	6 ft 8 in (2.03 m)	215 lb (98 kg)	So	Oxford, Alabama
G	1	James "Pop" Weathers	6 ft 0 in (1.83 m)	180 lb (82 kg)	Jr	Baton Rouge, Louisiana
G	2	Kalen Williams	6 ft 2 in (1.88 m)	175 lb (79 kg)	Sr	Hephzibah, Georgia
G	3	Tommie Lewis	6 ft 0 in (1.83 m)	180 lb (82 kg)	Sr	Vero Beach, Florida
G	4	JV Reeves, Jr.	6 ft 5 in (1.96 m)	205 lb (93 kg)	So	Tuscaloosa, Alabama
G	5	Ant Abraham	6 ft 1 in (1.85 m)	175 lb (79 kg)	Jr	Mount Vernon, New York
G	10	Alonzo Dodd	6 ft 1 in (1.85 m)	168 lb (76 kg)	So	Saint Paul, Minnesota
G	11	Khaliq Abdul-Mateen	6 ft 1 in (1.85 m)	186 lb (84 kg)	Jr	Houston, Texas
G	12	Kwo Agwa	6 ft 6 in (1.98 m)	185 lb (84 kg)	Jr	Calgary, Canada
F	21	Rob Banks	6 ft 5 in (1.96 m)	205 lb (93 kg)	RS Jr	Bracknell, England
F	23	KC Ugwuakazi	6 ft 8 in (2.03 m)	215 lb (98 kg)	Fr	Boston, Massachusetts
F	24	Jerome Brewer, Jr.	6 ft 9 in (2.06 m)	216 lb (98 kg)	So	Camden, New Jersey
G	25	Brandon Taylor	6 ft 0 in (1.83 m)	175 lb (79 kg)	Jr	Coppell, Texas
G	30	Evan Phelps	6 ft 0 in (1.83 m)	180 lb (82 kg)	Fr	Duncanville, Texas
G	32	Robbie Armbrester	6 ft 5 in (1.96 m)	205 lb (93 kg)	Jr	Atlanta, Georgia
G	35	Prince Davies	6 ft 5 in (1.96 m)	205 lb (93 kg)	Jr	Atlanta, Georgia

Head coach

- Jaret von Rosenberg (Hartford)

Assistant coach(es)

- Coleman Furst (Tarleton State)
- Yolonzo Moore (Hartford)
- A.J. Holland (University of Sioux Falls)

Legend

- (C) Team captain
- (S) Suspended
- (I) Ineligible
- (W) Walk-on
- Injured
- Current redshirt

Roster
Last update: October 21, 2023

== Schedule and results ==
Date time, TV	Rank^{#}	Opponent^{#}	Result	Record	High points	High rebounds	High assists	Site (attendance) city, state
Non-conference season
November 6, 2023*; 7:00 pm, SECN+/ESPN+		at No. 15 Texas A&M	L 46–78	0–1	13 – J. Brewer, Jr.	5 – J. Brewer, Jr.	3 – A. Dodd	Reed Arena (8,802); College Station, Texas
November 8, 2023*; 7:00 pm, ESPN+		at Texas Tech	L 46–73	0–2	13 – K. Williams	9 – J. Brewer, Jr.	4 – J. Weathers	United Supermarkets Arena (12,930); Lubbock, Texas
November 10, 2023*; 6:00 pm, SECN+		at No. 16 Kentucky; Wildcat Challenge	L 61–81	0–3	19 – K. Williams	7 – A. Dodd	4 – K. Williams	Rupp Arena (19,646); Lexington, Kentucky
November 12, 2023*; 1:00 pm, ESPN+		at Purdue Fort Wayne	L 64–86	0–4	13 – J. Brewer, Jr.	8 – KC Ugwuakazi	3 – A. Dodd	Allen County War Memorial Coliseum (1,889); Fort Wayne, Indiana
November 15, 2023*; 7:00 pm, ESPN+		Sciences and Arts of Oklahoma	W 113–63	1–4	14 – J. Brewer, Jr.	5 – P. Davies	6 – A. Abraham	The Field House (412); Commerce, Texas
November 17, 2023*; 6:00 pm		at Saint Joseph's; Wildcat Challenge	W 57–54	2–4	15 – T. Lewis	10 – T. Lewis	4 – J. Weathers	Hagan Arena (1,901); Philadelphia, Pennsylvania
November 20, 2023*; 7:00 pm, ESPN+		Stonehill; Wildcat Challenge	W 97–86	3–4	22 – J. Brewer, Jr.	5 – T. Lewis	10 – A. Dodd	The Field House (443); Commerce, Texas
November 26, 2023*; 1:00 pm, ESPN+		Denver	L 61–71	3–5	18 – K. Williams	10 – Z. Garrett	3 – A. Dodd	The Field House (216); Commerce, Texas
November 29, 2023*; 7:00 pm, ESPN+		Dallas Christian	W 100–48	4–5	18 – J. Brewer Jr.	10 – K. Agwa	5 – K. Williams	The Field House (428); Commerce, Texas
December 3, 2023*; 2:00 pm, ESPN+		at SMU	L 47–90	4–6	12 – K. Abdul-Mateen	3 – Tied	3 – J. Weathers	Moody Coliseum (4,672); Dallas, Texas
December 11, 2023*; 11:00 am, ESPN+		Northern Colorado	W 101–99 ^{2OT}	5–6	33 – K. Williams	9 – J. Brewer Jr.	7 – K. Williams	The Field House (1,873); Commerce, Texas
December 18, 2023*; 11:00 am, ESPN+		Arlington Baptist	W 130–53	6–6	22 – J. Brewer Jr.	6 – K. Agwa	6 – J. Weathers	The Field House (191); Commerce, Texas
January 1, 2024*; 3:00 pm, ESPN+		at TCU	L 42–77	6–7	10 – Z. Garrett	5 – Z. Garrett	4 – K. Williams	Schollmaier Arena (6,194); Fort Worth, Texas
Southland Conference season
January 6, 2024; 1:00 pm, ESPN+		McNeese	L 67–73	6–8 (0–1)	32 – J. Brewer, Jr.	7 – J. Brewer, Jr.	3 – T. Lewis	The Field House (446); Commerce, TX
January 8, 2024; 6:30 pm, ESPN+		at New Orleans	L 85–88	6–9 (0–2)	20 – T. Lewis	8 – J. Brewer, Jr.	4 – A. Dodd	Lakefront Arena (404); New Orleans, Louisiana
January 13, 2024; 1:00 pm, ESPN+		Houston Christian	L 65–69	6–10 (0–3)	28 – K. Williams	6 – A. Dodd	4 – K. Williams	The Field House (243); Commerce, Texas
January 20, 2024; 3:30 pm, ESPN+		at Southeastern Louisiana	W 68–52	7–10 (1–3)	15 – K. Williams	9 – K. Williams	7 – T. Lewis	Pride Roofing University Center (673); Hammond, Louisiana
January 22, 2024; 7:00 pm, ESPN+		at Lamar	L 65-76	7–11 (1–4)	18 – K. Williams	7 – A. Dodd	7 – A. Dodd	Neches Arena (1,454); Beaumont, Texas
January 27, 2024; 1:00 pm, ESPN+		Nicholls	L 84–87 ^{OT}	7–12 (1–5)	26 – T. Lewis	7 – Z. Garrett	6 – T. Lewis	The Field House (351); Commerce, Texas
January 29, 2024; 7:00 pm, ESPN+		Texas A&M–Corpus Christi	L 54–69	7–13 (1–6)	11 – K. Williams	4 – K. Williams	4 – J. Weathers	The Field House (506); Commerce, Texas
January 31, 2024; 1:00 pm, ESPN+		Incarnate Word	W 71–66	8–13 (2–6)	26 – K. Williams	5 – K. Agwa	5 – K. Williams	The Field House (203); Commerce, Texas
February 3, 2024; 3:00 pm, ESPN+		at Northwestern State	L 57–70	8–14 (2–7)	15 – K. Agwa	9 – K. Agwa	3 – K. Williams	Prather Coliseum (937); Natchitoches, Louisiana
February 5, 2024; 7:00 pm, ESPN+		at McNeese	L 51–77	8–15 (2–8)	10 – Tied	9 – T. Lewis	2 – Tied	The Legacy Center (3,703); Lake Charles, Louisiana
February 10, 2024; 1:00 pm, ESPN+		New Orleans	W 89–83	9–15 (3–8)	26 – K. Williams	6 – V. Reeves, Jr.	7 – A. Dodd	The Field House (556); Commerce, Texas
February 12, 2024; 7:00 pm, ESPN+		Southeastern Louisiana	L 77–79 ^{OT}	9–16 (3–9)	19 – J. Brewer, Jr.	8 – J. Brewer, Jr.	7 – T. Lewis	The Field House (309); Commerce, Texas
February 17, 2024; 3:30 pm, ESPN+		at Texas A&M-Corpus Christi	L 63–86	9–17 (3–10)	15 – K. Williams	6 – J. Brewer Jr.	4 – K. Williams	American Bank Center (1,591); Corpus Christi, Texas
February 19, 2024; 6:30 pm, ESPN+		at Incarnate Word	W 76–72 ^{OT}	10–17 (4–10)	20 – A. Dodd	7 – A. Dodd	5 – A. Dodd	McDermott Center; San Antonio, Texas
February 24, 2024; 3:00 pm, ESPN+		at Nicholls	L 70–85	10–18 (4–11)	31 – K. Williams	6 – T. Lewis	2 – K. Williams	Stopher Gymnasium (650); Thibodaux, Louisiana
March 2, 2024; 3:30 pm, ESPN+		at Houston Christian	W 98–85	11–18 (5–11)	35 – K. Williams	7 – K. Ugwuakazi	6 – K. Williams	Sharp Gymnasium (626); Houston, Texas
March 4, 2024; 7:00 pm, ESPN+		Lamar	L 53–70	11–19 (5–12)	14 – T. Lewis	7 – K. Abdul-Mateen	2 – Tied	The Field House (329); Commerce, Texas
March 6, 2024; 7:30 pm, ESPN+		Northwestern State	W 83–80 ^{3OT}	12–19 (6–12)	31 – Williams	9 – Tied	4 – Dodd	The Field House (837); Commerce, Texas
Southland Tournament
March 10, 2024; 7:30 pm, ESPN+	(7)	vs. (6) Northwestern State; First round	W 69–64	13–19	19 – K. Williams	8 – K. Abdul-Mateen	3 – T. Lewis	The Legacy Center (687); Lake Charles, LA
March 11, 2024; 7:30 pm, ESPN+	(7)	vs. (3) Nicholls; Second round	L 51–72	13–20	15 – A. Dodd	8 – K. Williams	3 – T. Lewis	The Legacy Center (270); Lake Charles, LA
*Non-conference game. ^{#}Rankings from AP Poll. (#) Tournament seedings in parentheses. All times are in Central Time.

== See also ==
- 2023–24 Texas A&M–Commerce Lions women's basketball team
