= 2023–24 Nicholls Colonels men's basketball team =

American college basketball season

2023–24 Nicholls Colonels men's basketball
- Conference: Southland Conference
- Record: 20–14 (13–5 Southland)
- Head coach: Tevon Saddler (1st season)
- Associate head coach: Dayshawn Wells
- Assistant coaches: Stephen Rodgers; Asad Lamot
- Home arena: Stopher Gymnasium

2023–24 Southland Conference men's basketball standings
	Conf.				Overall
Team	W		L	PCT	W		L	PCT
McNeese †	17	–	1	.944	30	–	4	.882
Texas A&M–Corpus Christi	14	–	4	.778	21	–	12	.636
Nicholls	13	–	5	.722	20	–	14	.588
Lamar	12	–	6	.667	19	–	14	.576
Southeastern Louisiana	10	–	8	.556	15	–	17	.469
Northwestern State	7	–	11	.389	9	–	23	.281
Texas A&M–Commerce*	6	–	12	.333	13	–	20	.394
New Orleans	4	–	14	.222	10	–	23	.303
Houston Christian	4	–	14	.222	6	–	23	.207
Incarnate Word	3	–	15	.167	8	–	23	.258
† 2024 Southland tournament winner * ineligible for the 2024 NCAA tournament due to transition period

The 2023–24 Nicholls State Colonels men's basketball team represented Nicholls State University in the 2023–24 NCAA Division I men's basketball season. The Colonels, led by first-year head coach Tevon Saddler, played their home games at Stopher Gymnasium in Thibodaux, Louisiana as members of the Southland Conference. They finished the season 20–14, 13–5 in Southland play, to finish third in the conference.

== Preseason polls ==
=== Southland Conference Poll ===
The Southland Conference released its preseason poll on October 10, 2023. Receiving 71 votes overall, the Colonels were picked to finish sixth in the conference.

Predicted finish	Team	Votes (1st place)
1	Southeastern	144 (6)
2	McNeese	142 (6)
3	New Orleans	132 (3)
4	Texas A&M–Corpus Christi	124 (5)
5	Northwestern State	84
6	Nicholls	71
7	Texas A&M–Commerce	66
8	Houston Christian	50
9	Lamar	45
10	Incarnate Word	42

=== Preseason All Conference ===
Micah Thomas, a guard, was selected as a second team Preseason All Conference member.

== Roster ==
2023–24 Nicholls State Colonels men's basketball team
Players
Coaches

Pos.	#	Name	Height	Weight	Year	Hometown
F	0	Mekhi Collins	6 ft 8 in (2.03 m)	225 lb (102 kg)	Jr	Cedar Hill, TX
F	1	Oumar Koureissi	6 ft 11 in (2.11 m)	220 lb (100 kg)	Jr	Harlem, NY
G	2	Robert III Brown	6 ft 4 in (1.93 m)	190 lb (86 kg)	Jr	Albany, NY
G	3	Micah Thomas	6 ft 0 in (1.83 m)	175 lb (79 kg)	Sr	Oklahoma City, OK
F	5	Diante Smith	6 ft 7 in (2.01 m)	200 lb (91 kg)	Fr	Fort Walton Beach, FL
F	6	Doctor Bradley	6 ft 8 in (2.03 m)	210 lb (95 kg)	Jr	Los Angeles, CA
G	7	Taj Anderson	6 ft 4 in (1.93 m)	175 lb (79 kg)	Jr	Queens, NY
G	9	Michael Jr. Gray	6 ft 2 in (1.88 m)	200 lb (91 kg)	So	Fredericksburg, VA
G	13	Byron Ireland	6 ft 2 in (1.88 m)	190 lb (86 kg)	Jr	Annapolis, MD
F	14	Taylor Blanchard	6 ft 5 in (1.96 m)	165 lb (75 kg)	Sr	Morgan City, LA
F	15	Jamal Jr. West	6 ft 6 in (1.98 m)	225 lb (102 kg)	Jr	Baltimore, MD
G	21	Jalen White	6 ft 4 in (1.93 m)	180 lb (82 kg)	Sr	Pasadena, TX
G	24	Quinn Strander	5 ft 10 in (1.78 m)	175 lb (79 kg)	Sr	Thibodaux, LA

Head coach

- Tevon Saddler (Nicholls State)

Assistant coach(es)

- Dayshawn Wells
- Stephen Rodgers (Coastal Carolina)
- Asad Lamot

Legend

- (C) Team captain
- (S) Suspended
- (I) Ineligible
- (W) Walk-on
- Injured
- Current redshirt

Roster

== Schedule and results ==
Date time, TV	Rank^{#}	Opponent^{#}	Result	Record	High points	High rebounds	High assists	Site (attendance) city, state
Non-conference regular season
November 6, 2023*; 8:00 p.m., ESPN+		at Tulane	L 81–91	0–1	24 – J. West Jr.	13 – M. Collins	4 – J. West Jr.	Devlin Fieldhouse (1,689); New Orleans, LA
November 10, 2023*; 7:00 p.m., SECN+/ESPN+		at LSU	W 68–66	1–1	18 – D. Smith	6 – tied (2)	4 – tied (2)	Pete Maravich Assembly Center (7,255); Baton Rouge, LA
November 15, 2023*; 6:00 p.m.		vs. Denver; Jaguar Classic	L 85–91	1–2	22 – J. West Jr.	8 – tied (2)	6 – D. Smith	Mitchell Center (1,109); Mobile, AL
November 16, 2023*; 7:00 p.m., ESPN+		at South Alabama; Jaguar Classic	W 102–97 ^{3OT}	2–2	31 – J. West Jr.	10 – D. Smith	6 – J. West Jr.	Mitchell Center (3,445); Mobile, AL
November 17, 2023*; 6:00 p.m.		vs. SIU Edwardsville; Jaguar Classic	L 51–60	2–3	16 – D. Smith	8 – tied (2)	2 – J. West Jr.	Mitchell Center (1,001); Mobile, AL
November 21, 2023*; 6:30 p.m., ESPN+		Blue Mountain Christian	W 86–56	3–3	18 – M. Gray Jr.	10 – O. Koureissi	5 – J. West Jr.	Stopher Gymnasium (450); Thibodaux, LA
November 24, 2023*; 1:00 p.m., SECN+/ESPN+		at No. 25 Mississippi State	L 61–74	3–4	17 – J. West Jr.	13 – J. West Jr.	4 – J. West Jr.	Humphrey Coliseum (7,571); Starkville, MS
November 28, 2023*; 7:00 p.m., ESPN+		at No. 9 Baylor	L 70–108	3–5	17 – R. Brown III	8 – J. West Jr.	2 – R. Brown III	Ferrell Center (7,166); Waco, TX
December 2, 2023*; 2:00 p.m., ESPN+		at Louisiana Tech	L 55–68	3–6	16 – J. White	8 – J. West Jr.	3 – B. Ireland	Thomas Assembly Center (2,018); Ruston, LA
December 9, 2023*; 3:00 p.m., ESPN+		Elizabeth City	W 84–70	4–6	25 – B. Ireland	9 – J. West Jr.	3 – J. West Jr.	Stopher Gymnasium (544); Thibodaux, LA
December 19, 2023*; 7:30 p.m., BTN		at Maryland	L 67–73	4–7	18 – D. Smith	18 – J. West Jr.	5 – D. Smith	Xfinity Center (11,004); College Park, MD
December 22, 2023*; 3:00 p.m., FloHoops		at Towson	L 55–65	4–8	21 – J. West Jr.	11 – J. West Jr.	2 – D. Smith	Towson Center (2,011); Towson, MD
December 30, 2023*; 1:00 p.m., ESPN+		Mobile	W 74–65	5–8	24 – B. Ireland	8 – D. Smith	2 – tied (4)	Stopher Gymnasium (450); Thibodaux, LA
Southland regular season
January 6, 2024; 3:30 p.m., ESPN+		at Houston Christian	W 98–94 ^{OT}	6–8 (1–0)	23 – J. West Jr.	10 – J. West Jr.	7 – D. Smith	Sharp Gymnasium (509); Houston, TX
January 9, 2024; 6:30 p.m., ESPN+		Southeastern Louisiana	W 66–61	7–8 (2–0)	18 – D. Smith	12 – B. Ireland	7 – D. Smith	Stopher Gymnasium (500); Thibodaux, LA
January 13, 2024; 3:00 p.m., ESPN+		Lamar	L 76–78 ^{OT}	7–9 (2–1)	25 – R. Brown III	9 – D. Smith	8 – D. Smith	Stopher Gymnasium (800); Thibodaux, LA
January 15, 2024; 6:30 p.m., ESPN+		New Orleans	W 78–75	8–9 (3–1)	21 – J. West Jr.	7 – J. West Jr.	4 – J. West Jr.	Stopher Gymnasium (950); Thibodaux, LA
January 20, 2024; 3:30 p.m., ESPN+		at Texas A&M–Corpus Christi	L 59–69	8–10 (3–2)	20 – D. Smith	10 – J. West Jr.	2 – D. Smith	American Bank Center (1,532); Corpus Christi, TX
January 22, 2024; TBA, ESPN+		at Incarnate Word	W 78–74 ^{OT}	9–10 (4–2)	20 – 2 tied	6 – 2 tied	2 – 3 tied	McDermott Center (135); San Antonio, TX
January 27, 2024; 1:00 p.m., ESPN+		at Texas A&M–Commerce	W 87–84 ^{OT}	10–10 (5–2)	29 – D. Smith	11 – D. Smith	3 – J. West Jr.	The Field House (351); Commerce, TX
February 3, 2024; 3:00 p.m., ESPN+		Houston Christian	W 83–73	11–10 (6–2)	23 – B. Ireland	5 – J. West Jr.	4 – D. Smith	Stopher Gymnasium (555); Thibodaux, LA
February 5, 2024; 6:30 p.m., ESPN+		Northwestern State	W 73–66	12–10 (7–2)	17 – tied (2)	8 – D. Smith	5 – J. West Jr.	Stopher Gymnasium (625); Thibodaux, LA
February 10, 2024; 6:00 p.m., ESPN+		at Lamar	L 56–75	12–11 (7–3)	15 – D. Smith	9 – D. Smith	3 – D. Smith	Neches Arena (2,353); Beaumont, TX
February 12, 2024; 6:30 p.m., ESPN+		Texas A&M–Corpus Christi	W 67–63	13–11 (8–3)	20 – D. Smith	8 – J. West Jr.	2 – D. Smith	Stopher Gymnasium (560); Thibodaux, LA
February 17, 2024; 3:00 p.m., ESPN+		McNeese	L 47–74	13–12 (8–4)	13 – D. Smith	7 – J. West Jr.	2 – tied (3)	Stopher Gymnasium (1,100); Thibodaux, LA
February 19, 2024; 7:00 p.m., ESPN+		at New Orleans	W 89–77	14–12 (9–4)	24 – R. Brown III	11 – D. Smith	4 – D. Smith	Lakefront Arena (708); New Orleans, LA
February 24, 2024; 3:00 p.m., ESPN+		Texas A&M–Commerce	W 85–70	15–12 (10–4)	19 – D. Smith	6 – J. West Jr.	6 – B. Ireland	Stopher Gymnasium (650); Thibodaux, LA
February 26, 2024; 6:30 p.m., ESPN+		Incarnate Word	W 92–82	16–12 (11–4)	28 – R. Brown III	4 – B. Ireland	7 – B. Ireland	Stopher Gymnasium (850); Thibodaux, LA
March 2, 2024; 4:00 p.m., ESPN+		at McNeese	L 62–83	16–13 (11–5)	29 – D. Smith	9 – D. Smith	4 – D. Smith	The Legacy Center (4,211); Lake Charles, LA
March 4, 2024; 6:30 p.m., ESPN+		at Northwestern State	W 68–62	17–13 (12–5)	21 – R. Brown III	9 – D. Smith	4 – B. Ireland	Prather Coliseum (745); Natchitoches, LA
March 7, 2024; 7:30 p.m., ESPN+		at Southeastern Louisiana	W 80–54	18–13 (13–5)	22 – West Jr.	11 – West Jr.	6 – Ireland	Pride Roofing University Center (935); Hammond, LA
Southland tournament
March 11, 2023; 7:30 p.m., ESPN+	(3)	vs. (7) Texas A&M–Commerce; Second round	W 72–51	19–13	18 – R. Brown III	7 – tied (2)	5 – Q. Strander	The Legacy Center (270); Lake Charles, LA
March 12, 2023; 8:00 p.m., ESPN+	(3)	vs. (2) Texas A&M–Corpus Christi; Semifinals	W 81–73 ^{OT}	20–13	22 – Smith	9 – tied (2)	5 – Gray Jr.	The Legacy Center (4,200); Lake Charles, LA
March 13, 2023; 4:00 p.m., ESPN2	(3)	at (1) McNeese; Championship	L 76–92	20–14	33 – Smith	6 – Collins	5 – Brown III	The Legacy Center (4,200); Lake Charles, LA
*Non-conference game. ^{#}Rankings from AP poll. (#) Tournament seedings in parentheses. All times are in Central.

== Conference awards and honors ==
=== Weekly awards ===
Weekly honors
Honors	Player	Position	Date awarded	Ref.
SLC Men's Basketball Player of the Week	Jamal West Jr.	F	November 13, 2023	
SLC Men's Basketball Player of the Week	Diante Smith	F	January 11, 2024	
SLC Men's Basketball Player of the Week	Diante Smith	F	January 29, 2024	

== See also ==
- 2023–24 Nicholls Colonels women's basketball team
