= 2023–24 Northwestern State Demons basketball team =

American college basketball season

2023–24 Northwestern State Demons men's basketball
- Conference: Southland Conference
- Record: 9–23 (7–11 Southland)
- Head coach: Rick Cabrera (1st season)
- Associate head coach: Anthony Figueroa
- Assistant coaches: T J Cox; Hayden Harkins; Chad Bailey
- Home arena: Prather Coliseum

2023–24 Southland Conference men's basketball standings
	Conf.				Overall
Team	W		L	PCT	W		L	PCT
McNeese †	17	–	1	.944	30	–	4	.882
Texas A&M–Corpus Christi	14	–	4	.778	21	–	12	.636
Nicholls	13	–	5	.722	20	–	14	.588
Lamar	12	–	6	.667	19	–	14	.576
Southeastern Louisiana	10	–	8	.556	15	–	17	.469
Northwestern State	7	–	11	.389	9	–	23	.281
Texas A&M–Commerce*	6	–	12	.333	13	–	20	.394
New Orleans	4	–	14	.222	10	–	23	.303
Houston Christian	4	–	14	.222	6	–	23	.207
Incarnate Word	3	–	15	.167	8	–	23	.258
† 2024 Southland tournament winner * ineligible for the 2024 NCAA tournament due to transition period

The 2023–24 Northwestern State Demons basketball team represented Northwestern State University in the 2023–24 NCAA Division I men's basketball season. The Demons, led by first-year head coach Rick Cabrera, played their home games at Prather Coliseum in Natchitoches, Louisiana as members of the Southland Conference.

== Preseason polls ==
=== Southland Conference Poll ===
The Southland Conference released its preseason poll on October 10, 2023. Receiving 84 votes overall, the Demons were picked to finish fifth in the conference.

Predicted finish	Team	Votes (1st place)
1	Southeastern	144 (6)
2	McNeese	142 (6)
3	New Orleans	132 (3)
4	Texas A&M–Corpus Christi	124 (5)
5	Northwestern State	84
6	Nicholls	71
7	Texas A&M–Commerce	66
8	Houston Christian	50
9	Lamar	45
10	Incarnate Word	42

=== Preseason All-conference ===
No Demons players were selected as a Preseason All-conference member.

== Roster ==
2023–24 Northwestern State Demons men's basketball team
Players
Coaches

Pos.	#	Name	Height	Weight	Year	Hometown
F	0	Jimel Lane	6 ft 7 in (2.01 m)	190 lb (86 kg)	So	Miami, FL
F	1	JT Warren	6 ft 7 in (2.01 m)	205 lb (93 kg)	Jr	Tifton, GA
G	2	Jamison Epps	6 ft 7 in (2.01 m)	205 lb (93 kg)	Jr	Lebanon, KY
G	3	John Wilson	5 ft 11 in (1.8 m)	175 lb (79 kg)	Jr	Brooklyn, NY
G	4	Braelon Bush	5 ft 8 in (1.73 m)	156 lb (71 kg)	Jr	Silsbee, TX
G	5	Ryan Forrest	6 ft 4 in (1.93 m)	190 lb (86 kg)	Fr	Marion, AR
G	10	Cliff Davis	6 ft 2 in (1.88 m)	185 lb (84 kg)	Jr	Thomasville, GA
F	11	Justin Wilson	6 ft 9 in (2.06 m)	220 lb (100 kg)	Sr	Dallas, TX
G	12	Jae Slack	6 ft 6 in (1.98 m)	218 lb (99 kg)	Jr	Fort Worth, TX
G	13	Mitch Williams	6 ft 2 in (1.88 m)	185 lb (84 kg)	Fr	Colleyville, TX
G	15	Chase Forte	6 ft 4 in (1.93 m)	190 lb (86 kg)	Jr	Raleigh, NC
G	21	Chris Mubiru	6 ft 5 in (1.96 m)	199 lb (90 kg)	Fr	Philadelphia, PA
C	22	JC Jr. Riley	6 ft 10 in (2.08 m)	250 lb (113 kg)	Fr	Atlanta, GA
G	23	Duane Posey	6 ft 7 in (2.01 m)	215 lb (98 kg)	Jr	Memphis, TN
G	25	Anthony Thomas	6 ft 7 in (2.01 m)	195 lb (88 kg)	Jr	Washington, D.C.
C	32	Jordan Wilmore	7 ft 3 in (2.21 m)	310 lb (141 kg)	Jr	Memphis, TN
G	35	Karlin Hardy	6 ft 4 in (1.93 m)	180 lb (82 kg)	So	Lake Charles, LA

Head coach

- Rick Cabrera (Vincennes University/Tennessee Tech)

Assistant coach(es)

- Anthony Figueroa
- T J Cox
- Hayden Harkins
- Chad Bailey

Legend

- (C) Team captain
- (S) Suspended
- (I) Ineligible
- (W) Walk-on
- Injured
- Current redshirt

Roster
Last update: June 22, 2024

== Schedule and results ==
Date time, TV	Rank^{#}	Opponent^{#}	Result	Record	High points	High rebounds	High assists	Site (attendance) city, state
Non-conference regular season
November 6, 2023*; 6:30 p.m., ESPN+		Dallas Christian	W 101–54	1–0	19 – J. Lane	12 – J. Epps	5 – J. Epps	Prather Coliseum (1,021); Natchitoches, LA
November 9, 2023*; 6:00 p.m., ESPN+		at Tulane	L 71–88	1–1	23 – R. Forrest	10 – J. Epps	3 – tied (2)	Devlin Fieldhouse (4,100); New Orleans, LA
November 13, 2023*; 6:30 p.m., ESPN+		Stephen F. Austin	L 70–96	1–2	23 – C. Davis	10 – J. Epps	5 – C. Forte	Prather Coliseum (1,111); Natchitoches, LA
November 16, 2023*; 3:00 p.m.		vs. Maine; North Florida MTE Tournament	L 65–78	1–3	16 – J. Epps	8 – J. Epps	3 – C. Forte	UNF Arena (135); Jacksonville, FL
November 17, 2023*; 6:00 p.m.		at North Florida; North Florida MTE Tournament	L 74–80	1–4	25 – R. Forrest	8 – C. Forte	5 – B. Bush	UNF Arena (1,229); Jacksonville, FL
November 18, 2023*; 1:00 p.m.		vs. Presbyterian; North Florida MTE Tournament	L 75–78	1–5	25 – R. Forrest	8 – J. Epps	3 – J. Wilson	UNF Arena (221); Jacksonville, FL
November 28, 2023*; 6:30 p.m., ESPN+		at Louisiana–Monroe	L 70–74	1–6	17 – B. Bush	5 – C. Davis	4 – C. Forte	Fant–Ewing Coliseum (909); Monroe, LA
December 2, 2023*; 5:00 p.m., ESPN+		at No. 9 Baylor	L 40–91	1–7	10 – J. Lane	4 – tied (2)	3 – C. Forte	Ferrell Center (8,432); Waco, TX
December 9, 2023*; 1:00 p.m., ESPN+		at Southern Miss	L 74–83	1–8	24 – C. Davis	8 – C. Davis	4 – B. Bush	Reed Green Coliseum (3,699); Hattiesburg, MS
December 12, 2023*; 8:00 p.m., MW Network		at Boise State	L 54–95	1–9	21 – C. Davis	4 – B. Bush	5 – B. Bush	ExtraMile Arena (8,471); Boise, ID
December 16, 2023*; 2:00 p.m., ESPN+		Rice	L 51–76	1–10	10 – J. Wilson	6 – C. Forte	3 – B. Bush	Prather Coliseum (333); Natchitoches, LA
December 19, 2023*; 6:30 p.m., ESPN+		Southern–New Orleans	W 99–75	2–10	30 – C. Davis	15 – D. Posey	10 – B. Bush	Prather Coliseum (510); Natchitoches, LA
December 29, 2023*; 7:00 p.m., SECN+/ESPN+		at LSU	L 55–96	2–11	9 – tied (2)	6 – tied (2)	2 – tied (3)	Pete Maravich Assembly Center (8,256); Baton Rouge, LA
Southland regular season
January 6, 2024; 6:00 p.m., ESPN+		at Lamar	L 70–90	2–12 (0–1)	27 – C. Davis	5 – C. Davis	7 – B. Bush	Neches Arena (2,768); Beaumont, TX
January 8, 2024; 6:30 p.m., ESPN+		McNeese	L 59–68	2–13 (0–2)	17 – C. Davis	7 – J. Wilson	4 – tied (2)	Prather Coliseum (1,035); Natchitoches, LA
January 13, 2024; 3:00 p.m., ESPN+		Incarnate Word	W 97–71	3–13 (1–2)	20 – J. Lane	7 – C. Forte	7 – C. Forte	Prather Coliseum (1,063); Natchitoches, LA
January 15, 2024; 6:30 p.m., ESPN+		Houston Christian	W 69–64	4–13 (2–2)	15 – B. Bush	10 – D. Posey	5 – C. Forte	Prather Coliseum (498); Natchitoches, LA
January 20, 2024; 4:00 p.m., ESPN+		at New Orleans	W 92–67	5–13 (3–2)	18 – J. Wilson	11 – J. Wilson	7 – B. Bush	Lakefront Arena (1,030); New Orleans, LA
January 22, 2024; 6:00 p.m., ESPN+		at Southeastern Louisiana	L 62–71	5–14 (3–3)	15 – C. Davis	7 – tied (2)	4 – C. Davis	Pride Roofing University Center (658); Hammond, LA
January 27, 2024; 3:00 p.m., ESPN+		Texas A&M–Corpus Christi	L 68–79	5–15 (3–4)	16 – J. Wilson	5 – J. Wilson	6 – C. Forte	Prather Coliseum (1,133); Natchitoches, LA
January 29, 2024; 7:00 p.m., ESPN+		at McNeese	L 65–89	5–16 (3–5)	17 – C. Muribu	6 – C. Forte	5 – C. Forte	The Legacy Center (4,058); Lake Charles, LA
February 3, 2024; 3:00 p.m., ESPN+		Texas A&M–Commerce	W 70–57	6–16 (4–5)	17 – J. Wilson	8 – J. Wilson	5 – C. Forte	Prather Coliseum (937); Natchitoches, LA
February 5, 2024; 6:30 p.m., ESPN+		at Nicholls	L 66–73	6–17 (4–6)	25 – C. Davis	6 – D. Posey	4 – B. Bush	Stopher Gymnasium (625); Thibodaux, LA
February 10, 2024; 3:00 p.m., ESPN+		Southeastern Louisiana	L 59–69	6–18 (4–7)	17 – C. Davis	7 – D. Posey	5 – C. Forte	Prather Coliseum (1,000); Natchitoches, LA
February 12, 2024; 6:30 p.m., ESPN+		New Orleans	W 70–59	7–18 (5–7)	14 – C. Forte	6 – J. Lane	7 – C. Forte	Prather Coliseum (621); Natchitoches, LA
February 17, 2024; 5:00 p.m., ESPN+		at Incarnate Word	W 81–61	8–18 (6–7)	18 – J. Slack	7 – C. Forte	3 – tied (2)	McDermott Center (150); San Antonio, TX
February 19, 2024; 7:00 p.m., ESPN+		at Texas A&M–Corpus Christi	L 61–72	8–19 (6–8)	16 – D. Posey	9 – D. Posey	3 – C. Forte	American Bank Center (1,149); Corpus Christi, TX
February 24, 2024; 3:30 p.m., ESPN+		at Houston Christian	W 86–73	9–19 (7–8)	19 – B. Bush	7 – J. Wilson	5 – C. Forte	Sharp Gymnasium (431); Houston, TX
March 2, 2024; 3:00 p.m., ESPN+		Lamar	L 77–82 ^{OT}	9–20 (7–9)	24 – J. Wilson	6 – J. Wilson	6 – C. Forte	Prather Coliseum (1,127); Natchitoches, LA
March 4, 2024; 6:30 p.m., ESPN+		Nicholls	L 62–68	9–21 (7–10)	15 – B. Bush	8 – J. Lane	7 – C. Forte	Prather Coliseum (745); Natchitoches, LA
March 6, 2024; 7:30 p.m., ESPN+		at Texas A&M–Commerce	L 80–83 ^{3OT}	9–22 (7–11)	29 – J. Wilson	10 – C. Forte	5 – B. Bush	The Field House (837); Commerce, TX
Southland tournament
March 10, 2024; 7:30 p.m., ESPN+	(6)	vs. (7) Texas A&M–Commerce; First round	L 64–69	9–23	20 – Ju. Wilson	9 – Ju. Wilson	3 – C. Forte	The Legacy Center (687); Lake Charles, LA
*Non-conference game. ^{#}Rankings from AP poll. (#) Tournament seedings in parentheses. All times are in Central.

== See also ==
- 2023–24 Northwestern State Lady Demons basketball team
