= Shahada Wells =

American basketball player (born 1999)

No. 13 – Psychiko
- Position: Point guard / shooting guard
- League: Greek Elite League

Personal information
- Born: August 26, 1999 (age 27) Amarillo, Texas, U.S.
- Listed height: 6 ft 0 in (1.83 m)
- Listed weight: 184 lb (83 kg)

Career information
- High school: Tascosa (Amarillo, Texas)
- College: Tyler JC (2018–2020); UT Arlington (2020–2021); TCU (2021–2023); McNeese (2023–2024)
- Playing career: 2024–present

Career history
- 2024: Peja
- 2024–2025: Karditsa
- 2025–present: Psychiko

Career highlights
- Southland Player of the Year (2024); First-team All-Southland (2024); Second-team All-Sun Belt (2021); Southland Newcomer of the Year (2024); Southland All-Defensive Team (2024); Southland tournament MVP (2024)

Shahada Wells (born August 26, 1999) is an American professional basketball player for Psychiko of the Greek Elite League. He previously played for the McNeese Cowboys, Tyler Junior College Apaches, UT Arlington Mavericks, and TCU Horned Frogs.

== High school career ==
Wells attended Tascosa High School in Amarillo, Texas. As a senior, he averaged 21.1 points, 7.2 rebounds and 5.8 assists per game, before committing to play college basketball at Tyler Junior College.

== College career ==
As a sophomore at Tyler Junior College, Wells averaged 21.6 points, 6.0 assists, 5.0 rebounds, and 2.4 steals, being named the player of the year in the region. As a result, he was named a first-team NJCAA All-American.

After graduating from Tyler Junior College, Wells joined the UT Arlington Mavericks. In his only season at UTA, Wells led the team in points, steals, assists, and minutes played, making an immediate impact. Following the season, he entered the transfer portal.

In April 2021, Wells announced that he would be transferring to Texas Christian University to play for the TCU Horned Frogs. After playing sparingly during his first season at TCU, he made an impact coming off the bench the following season. Following the conclusion of his second season with TCU, Wells entered the transfer portal for a second time.

In April 2023, Wells announced that he would be transferring to McNeese State University to play for the McNeese Cowboys. He began the season with multiple games scoring over 30 points, including a 36-point performance against UAB which led to him being named the conference player of the week. On December 29, 2023, in a game against Michigan, Wells tallied 30 points, ten rebounds, six assists and five steals, helping lead McNeese to their first victory over a Big Ten program in school history. As a result, he was named the conference player of the week. He was also named the national player of the week for his performance. At the conclusion of the regular season, Wells was named the Southland Player of the Year as well as the Newcomer of the Year. Against Nicholls in the Southland championship game, he scored 27 points, helping lead McNeese to their first NCAA tournament appearance since 2002 and being named tournament MVP.

=== College statistics ===
Year	Team	GP	GS	MPG	FG%	3P%	FT%	RPG	APG	SPG	BPG	PPG
2020–21	UT Arlington	25	24	30.1	.416	.393	.784	3.4	3.8	2.2	0.3	16.8
2021–22	TCU	7	0	7.3	.278	.273	-	1.1	0.3	0.2	0.0	1.9
2022–23	TCU	35	9	17.3	.443	.244	.714	2.2	2.3	1.1	0.2	5.9
2023–24	McNeese	33	33	32.6	.462	.384	.794	4.5	4.7	3.0	0.3	17.8
Career		100	66	24.8	.438	.352	.781	3.2	3.3	1.9	0.2	12.3
