= 2023–24 Texas A&M–Corpus Christi Islanders men's basketball team =

American college basketball season

2023–24 Texas A&M–Corpus Christi Islanders men's basketball

CIT, first round
- Conference: Southland Conference
- Record: 21–12 (14–4 Southland)
- Head coach: Jim Shaw (1st season)
- Assistant coaches: Ralph Davis; Cole Dewey; Alex Hausladen; Dylan Johnson
- Home arena: American Bank Center; Dugan Wellness Center

2023–24 Southland Conference men's basketball standings
	Conf.				Overall
Team	W		L	PCT	W		L	PCT
McNeese †	17	–	1	.944	30	–	4	.882
Texas A&M–Corpus Christi	14	–	4	.778	21	–	12	.636
Nicholls	13	–	5	.722	20	–	14	.588
Lamar	12	–	6	.667	19	–	14	.576
Southeastern Louisiana	10	–	8	.556	15	–	17	.469
Northwestern State	7	–	11	.389	9	–	23	.281
Texas A&M–Commerce*	6	–	12	.333	13	–	20	.394
New Orleans	4	–	14	.222	10	–	23	.303
Houston Christian	4	–	14	.222	6	–	23	.207
Incarnate Word	3	–	15	.167	8	–	23	.258
† 2024 Southland tournament winner * ineligible for the 2024 NCAA tournament due to transition period

The 2023–24 Texas A&M–Corpus Christi Islanders men's basketball team represented Texas A&M University–Corpus Christi in the 2023–24 NCAA Division I men's basketball season as members of the Southland Conference. The Islanders were led by first-year head coach Jim Shaw. With the exception of four games at the Dugan Wellness Center, all home games were played at American Bank Center. Both arenas are located in Corpus Christi, Texas.

The Islanders finished the season 21–12, 14–4 in Southland play, to finish in second place. They were defeated by Nicholls in the semifinals of the Southland tournament. They received an invitation to the CIT, where they fell to Abilene Christian in the first round.

== Previous season ==
The Islanders finished the season 24–11, 14–4 in Southland play, to win the regular-season championship. They defeated McNeese and Northwestern State to win the Southland tournament for the second consecutive year. As a result, they received the conference's automatic bid to the NCAA tournament, as a No. 16 seed in the South region. In the First Four, they defeated Southeast Missouri State before losing to overall No. 1 seed Alabama in the first round.

== Preseason polls ==
=== Southland Conference poll ===
The Southland Conference released its preseason poll on October 10, 2023. Receiving 124 votes overall and five first-place votes, the Islanders were picked to finish fourth in the conference.

Predicted finish	Team	Votes (1st place)
1	Southeastern	144 (6)
2	McNeese	142 (6)
3	New Orleans	132 (3)
4	Texas A&M–Corpus Christi	124 (5)
5	Northwestern State	84
6	Nicholls	71
7	Texas A&M–Commerce	66
8	Houston Christian	50
9	Lamar	45
10	Incarnate Word	42

=== Preseason all-conference ===
No Islanders were selected as first-team members of a preseason all-conference team.

== Roster ==
2023–24 Texas A&M–Corpus Christi Islanders men's basketball team
Players
Coaches

Pos.	#	Name	Height	Weight	Year	Hometown
G	0	Marion Humphrey	6 ft 3 in (1.91 m)	180 lb (82 kg)	GS	Hoover, AL
G	1	Dian Wright-Forde	6 ft 3 in (1.91 m)	210 lb (95 kg)	Jr	Bay Shore, NY
G	2	Jordan Roberts	6 ft 4 in (1.93 m)	170 lb (77 kg)	Jr	Grand Prairie, TX
G	3	Christian Villegas	6 ft 2 in (1.88 m)	155 lb (70 kg)	Jr	El Paso, TX
G	4	Kam Parker	6 ft 2 in (1.88 m)	180 lb (82 kg)	So	Tulsa, OK
G	5	Amont'e Allen-Johnson	6 ft 1 in (1.85 m)	—	Fr	Flint, MI
G	10	Tedrick Jr. Washington	6 ft 2 in (1.88 m)	175 lb (79 kg)	Jr	Blytheville, AR
F	12	Owen Dease	6 ft 8 in (2.03 m)	180 lb (82 kg)	RS So	Evansville, IN
C	13	Shilo Jackson	6 ft 9 in (2.06 m)	210 lb (95 kg)	Jr	Indianapolis, IN
G	14	Jaren Marshall	6 ft 1 in (1.85 m)	168 lb (76 kg)	So	Omaha, NE
F	21	Aaron Harden	6 ft 7 in (2.01 m)	190 lb (86 kg)	RS Fr	San Antonio, TX
G	23	Xavier Glenn	6 ft 4 in (1.93 m)	185 lb (84 kg)	Jr	Bixby, OK
C	32	Stephen Giwa	6 ft 9 in (2.06 m)	220 lb (100 kg)	RS So	Houston, TX
C	33	Garry Clark	6 ft 8 in (2.03 m)	210 lb (95 kg)	Jr	St. Louis, MO
G	40	Lance-Amir Paul	6 ft 0 in (1.83 m)	185 lb (84 kg)	GS	Kingston, Jamaica
F	44	Dayne Prim	6 ft 6 in (1.98 m)	195 lb (88 kg)	RS Sr	Aurora, CO

Head coach

- Jim Shaw (Grinnell)

Assistant coach(es)

- Ralph Davis (Texas A&M–Kingsville)
- Cole Dewey (Campbell)
- Alex Hausladen (Arkansas)
- Dylan Johnson (Michigan)

Legend

- (C) Team captain
- (S) Suspended
- (I) Ineligible
- (W) Walk-on
- Injured
- Current redshirt

Roster
Last update: February 20, 2024

== Schedule and results ==
Date time, TV	Rank^{#}	Opponent^{#}	Result	Record	High points	High rebounds	High assists	Site (attendance) city, state
Non-conference regular season
November 7, 2023*; 7:30 p.m., ESPN+		Southwestern Adventist	W 111–46	1–0	16 – J. Roberts	9 – G. Clark	7 – M. Humphrey	Dugan Wellness Center (1,400); Corpus Christi, TX
November 11, 2023*; 12:30 p.m., ESPN+		at No. 7 Houston	L 50–82	1–1	10 – L. Paul	8 – G. Clark	3 – tied (2)	Fertitta Center (7,145); Houston, TX
November 13, 2023*; 7:30 p.m., ESPN+		Dallas Christian	W 104–45	2–1	18 – L. Paul	8 – tied (2)	5 – D. Wright-Forde	Dugan Wellness Center (1,002); Corpus Christi, TX
November 16, 2023*; 7:00 p.m., ESPN+		at Texas Tech	L 64–73	2–2	16 – D. Wright-Forde	7 – tied (2)	2 – tied (3)	United Supermarkets Arena (11,366); Lubbock, TX
November 22, 2023*; 5:00 p.m., ESPN+		at Northern Kentucky; NKU Thanksgiving Tournament	L 73–88	2–3	14 – G. Clark	10 – G. Clark	8 – L. Paul	Truist Arena (2,395); Highland Heights, KY
November 24, 2023*; 1:00 p.m.		vs. LIU; NKU Thanksgiving Tournament	L 68–83	2–4	19 – D. Wright-Forde	10 – G. Clark	1 – tied (5)	Truist Arena (358); Highland Heights, KY
November 29, 2023*; 8:00 p.m., ESPN+		at UTEP	W 67–43	3–4	17 – D. Wright-Forde	12 – D. Prim	2 – D Wright-Forde	Don Haskins Center (4,671); El Paso, TX
December 6, 2023*; 7:00 p.m., ESPN+		UT Rio Grande Valley; South Texas Showdown	L 74–76	3–5	23 – D. Wright-Forde	8 – S. Giwa	2 – D. Wright-Forde	American Bank Center (2,296); Corpus Christi, TX
December 9, 2023*; 3:30 p.m., ESPN+		Omaha	W 62–58	4–5	19 – D. Prim	12 – S. Giwa	5 – M. Humphrey	American Bank Center (1,161); Corpus Christi, TX
December 15, 2023*; 6:30 p.m., ESPN+		at UT Rio Grande Valley; South Texas Showdown	W 86–76	5–5	26 – G. Clark	10 – G. Clark	6 – M. Humphrey	UTRGV Fieldhouse (1,012); Edinburg, TX
December 18, 2023*; 11:00 a.m., ESPN+		Texas Lutheran	W 102–50	6–5	14 – L. Paul	10 – G. Clark	6 – M. Humphrey	Dugan Wellness Center (1,400); Corpus Christi, TX
December 22, 2023*; 2:00 p.m., LHN		at No. 19 Texas	L 55–71	6–6	10 – D. Wright-Forde	6 – G. Clark	4 – D. Prim	Moody Center (10,704); Austin, TX
December 30, 2023*; 3:30 p.m., ESPN+		Schreiner	W 84–61	7–6	16 – O. Dease	10 – G. Clark	3 – tied (2)	Dugan Wellness Center (1,055); Corpus Christi, TX
Southland Conference Regular season
January 6, 2024; 5:00 p.m., ESPN+		at Incarnate Word	W 75–65	8–6 (1–0)	14 – G. Clark	10 – G. Clark	4 – D. Prim	McDermott Center (218); San Antonio, TX
January 8, 2024; 7:00 p.m., ESPN+		Houston Christian	W 81–59	9–6 (2–0)	18 – G. Clark	10 – G. Clark	4 – M. Humphrey	American Bank Center (795); Corpus Christi, TX
January 13, 2024; 4:00 p.m., ESPN+		at New Orleans	L 80–83	9–7 (2–1)	23 – D. Wright-Forde	8 – G. Clark	2 – tied (3)	Lakefront Arena (792); New Orleans, LA
January 15, 2024; 6:00 p.m., ESPN+		at Southeastern	W 73–68	10–7 (3–1)	17 – J. Roberts	8 – S. Giwa	– M. Humphrey	Pride Roofing University Center (407); Hammond, LA
January 20, 2024; 3:30 p.m., ESPN+		Nicholls	W 69–59	11–7 (4–1)	22 – G. Clark	13 – G. Clark	4 – O. Dease	American Bank Center (1,532); Corpus Christi, TX
January 22, 2024; 6:00 p.m., ESPN+		McNeese	L 61–62	11–8 (4–2)	18 – J. Roberts	10 – G. Clark	5 – M. Humphrey	American Bank Center (2,416); Corpus Christi, TX
January 27, 2024; 3:00 p.m., ESPN+		at Northwestern State	W 79–68	12–8 (5–2)	17 – D. Prim	8 – S. Giwa	6 – M. Humphrey	Prather Coliseum (1,133); Natchitoches, LA
January 29, 2024; 7:00 p.m., ESPN+		at Texas A&M–Commerce	W 69–54	13–8 (6–2)	18 – G. Clark	10 – G. Clark	3 – O. Dease	The Field House (506); Commerce, TX
February 3, 2024; 3:30 p.m., ESPN+		Lamar	W 79–71	14–8 (7–2)	19 – D. Prim	7 – D. Prim	4 – L. Paul	American Bank Center (2,465); Corpus Christi, TX
February 10, 2024; 4:00 p.m., ESPN+		at McNeese	L 67–74	14–9 (7–3)	16 – G. Clark	9 – G. Clark	4 – M. Humphrey	The Legacy Center (4,324); Lake Charles, LA
February 12, 2024; 6:30 p.m., ESPN+		at Nicholls	L 63–67	14–10 (7–4)	– G. Clark	– G. Clark	– D. Wright-Forde	Stopher Gymnasium (560); Thibodaux, LA
February 17, 2024; 3:30 p.m., ESPN+		Texas A&M–Commerce	W 86–63	15–10 (8–4)	24 – G. Clark	10 – D. Prim	7 – M. Humphrey	American Bank Center (1,591); Corpus Christi, TX
February 19, 2024; 7:00 p.m., ESPN+		Northwestern State	W 72–61	16–10 (9–4)	22 – J. Roberts	14 – S. Giwa	5 – M. Humphrey	American Bank Center (1,149); Corpus Christi, TX
February 24, 2024; 6:00 p.m., ESPN+		at Lamar	W 75–61	17–10 (10–4)	17 – J. Roberts	10 – S. Giwa	4 – J. Roberts	Neches Arena (3,176); Beaumont, TX
February 26, 2024; 7:00 p.m., ESPN+		at Houston Christian	W 91–79	18–10 (11–4)	25 – J. Roberts	8 – D. Prim	3 – J. Roberts	Sharp Gymnasium (491); Houston, TX
March 2, 2024; 4:30 p.m., ESPN+		Southeastern Louisiana	W 80–68	19–10 (12–4)	21 – G. Clark	8 – D. Prim	6 – M. Humphrey	American Bank Center (2,848); Corpus Christi, TX
March 4, 2024; 7:00 p.m., ESPN+		New Orleans	W 73–60	20–10 (13–4)	21 – G. Clark	10 – G. Clark	4 – M. Humphrey	American Bank Center (1,358); Corpus Christi, TX
March 6, 2024; 7:30 p.m., ESPN+		Incarnate Word	W 71–52	21–10 (14–4)	12 – tied (2)	11 – S. Giwa	4 – M. Humphrey	American Bank Center (2,719); Corpus Christi, TX
Southland tournament
March 12, 2024; 8:00 p.m., ESPN+	(2)	vs. (3) Nicholls; Semifinals	L 73–81 ^{OT}	21–11	17 – G. Clark	7 – D. Prim	6 – M. Humphrey	The Legacy Center (4,200); Lake Charles, LA
CIT
March 19, 2024; 9:00 p.m., ESPN+		vs. Abilene Christian; Lou Henson Classic – first round	L 63–73	21–12	22 – Roberts	10 – Dease	4 – Humphrey	Wisdom Gym (615); Stephenville, TX
*Non-conference game. ^{#}Rankings from AP poll. (#) Tournament seedings in parentheses. All times are in Central.

== Conference awards and honors ==
=== Weekly awards ===
Weekly honors
Honors	Player	Position	Date awarded	Ref.
SLC Men's Basketball Player of the Week	Dayne Prim	F	December 11, 2023	
SLC Men's Basketball Player of the Week	Garry Clark	C	January 22, 2024	
SLC Men's Basketball Player of the Week	Jordan Roberts	G	February 26, 2024	
SLC Men's Basketball Player of the Week	Garry Clark	C	March 4, 2024	

== See also ==
- 2023–24 Texas A&M–Corpus Christi Islanders women's basketball team
