= 2023–24 McNeese Cowboys basketball team =

American college basketball season

2023–24 McNeese Cowboys basketball

Southland regular-season champions Southland tournament champions

NCAA tournament, first round
- Conference: Southland Conference
- Record: 30–4 (17–1 Southland)
- Head coach: Will Wade (1st season)
- Associate head coach: Brandon Chambers
- Assistant coaches: Vernon Hamilton; Nick Flory
- Home arena: The Legacy Center

2023–24 Southland Conference men's basketball standings
	Conf.				Overall
Team	W		L	PCT	W		L	PCT
McNeese †	17	–	1	.944	30	–	4	.882
Texas A&M–Corpus Christi	14	–	4	.778	21	–	12	.636
Nicholls	13	–	5	.722	20	–	14	.588
Lamar	12	–	6	.667	19	–	14	.576
Southeastern Louisiana	10	–	8	.556	15	–	17	.469
Northwestern State	7	–	11	.389	9	–	23	.281
Texas A&M–Commerce*	6	–	12	.333	13	–	20	.394
New Orleans	4	–	14	.222	10	–	23	.303
Houston Christian	4	–	14	.222	6	–	23	.207
Incarnate Word	3	–	15	.167	8	–	23	.258
† 2024 Southland tournament winner * ineligible for the 2024 NCAA tournament due to transition period

The 2023–24 McNeese Cowboys basketball team represented McNeese State University in the 2023–24 NCAA Division I men's basketball season. The Cowboys, led by first-year head coach Will Wade, played their home games on-campus at The Legacy Center in Lake Charles, Louisiana as members of the Southland Conference.

The Cowboys finished the season 30–4, 17–1 in Southland play, to finish as Southland regular-season champions. They defeated Lamar and Nicholls to win the Southland tournament title, earning their first trip to the NCAA tournament since 2002. In the NCAA tournament, they received the #12 seed in the Midwest Region, where they fell to Gonzaga in the first round.

== Preseason polls ==
=== Southland Conference Poll ===
The Southland Conference released its preseason poll on October 10, 2023. Receiving 142 votes overall and six first-place votes, the Cowboys were picked to finish second in the conference.

Predicted finish	Team	Votes (1st place)
1	Southeastern	144 (6)
2	McNeese	142 (6)
3	New Orleans	132 (3)
4	Texas A&M–Corpus Christi	124 (5)
5	Northwestern State	84
6	Nicholls	71
7	Texas A&M–Commerce	66
8	Houston Christian	50
9	Lamar	45
10	Incarnate Word	42

=== Preseason All Conference ===
Christian Shumate, forward, and Shahada Wells, guard, were selected as first-team members of a Preseason all conference team. Javohn Garcia, guard, was selected as a second-team member.

== Roster ==
2023–24 McNeese Cowboys men's basketball team
Players
Coaches

Pos.	#	Name	Height	Weight	Year	Hometown
G	0	T'John Brown	5 ft 11 in (1.8 m)	164 lb (74 kg)	Fr	Dallas, TX
G	1	Omar Cooper	6 ft 0 in (1.83 m)	179 lb (81 kg)	Jr	Atlanta, GA
G	2	DJ Jr. Richards	6 ft 4 in (1.93 m)	185 lb (84 kg)	So	Houston, TX
G	3	Mike Jr. Saunders	6 ft 0 in (1.83 m)	189 lb (86 kg)	Jr	Indianapolis, IN
F	5	Antavion Collum	6 ft 9 in (2.06 m)	245 lb (111 kg)	GS	Memphis, TN
F	10	Roberts Berze	6 ft 7 in (2.01 m)	208 lb (94 kg)	Sr	Sigulda, Latvia
F	11	CJ Felder	6 ft 8 in (2.03 m)	239 lb (108 kg)	Sr	Sumter, SC
F	12	Dionjahe Thomas	6 ft 8 in (2.03 m)	233 lb (106 kg)	So	Houma, LA
G	13	Shahada Wells	6 ft 0 in (1.83 m)	184 lb (83 kg)	GS	Amarillo, TX
G	14	Javohn Garcia	6 ft 3 in (1.91 m)	183 lb (83 kg)	Jr	Columbus, OH
G	20	Wesley Fields	5 ft 10 in (1.78 m)	163 lb (74 kg)	RS Fr	Baton Rouge, LA
F	22	Seth Mays	6 ft 5 in (1.96 m)	192 lb (87 kg)	RS Jr	Baton Rouge, LA
F	23	Nasir Mann	6 ft 6 in (1.98 m)	192 lb (87 kg)	Jr	Gainesville, FL
F	24	Christian Shumate	6 ft 7 in (2.01 m)	213 lb (97 kg)	Jr	Chicago, IL
F	35	Cameron Jones	6 ft 6 in (1.98 m)	192 lb (87 kg)	GS	Memphis, TN

Head coach

- Will Wade (Clemson)

Assistant coach(es)

- Brandon Chambers (VCU)
- Vernon Hamilton (Clemson)
- Nick Flory

Legend

- (C) Team captain
- (S) Suspended
- (I) Ineligible
- (W) Walk-on
- Injured
- Current redshirt

Roster
Last update: October 18, 2023

== Schedule and results ==
Date time, TV	Rank^{#}	Opponent^{#}	Result	Record	High points	High rebounds	High assists	Site (attendance) city, state
Non-conference regular season
November 6, 2023*; 6:00 p.m., ESPN+		at VCU	W 76–65	1–0	23 – S. Wells	13 – C. Shumate	4 – S. Wells	Siegel Center (7,637); Richmond, VA
November 10, 2023*; 4:00 p.m., −		Biblical Studies	W 96–55	2–0	26 – A. Collum	8 – A. Collum	5 – O. Cooper	The Legacy Center (2,221); Lake Charles, LA
November 13, 2023*; 7:00 p.m., ESPN+		Champion Christian	W 110–46	3–0	15 – tied (2)	10 – C. Shumate	4 – tied (2)	The Legacy Center (1,970); Lake Charles, LA
November 14, 2023*; 7:00 p.m., ESPN+		LeTourneau	W 81–49	4–0	15 – D. Richards Jr.	10 – C. Shumate	6 – C. Jones	The Legacy Center (1,924); Lake Charles, LA
November 18, 2023*; 3:00 p.m., ESPN+		at Western Carolina	L 74–76	4–1	37 – S. Wells	8 – C. Shumate	3 – S. Wells	Ramsey Center (1,916); Cullowhee, NC
November 21, 2023*; 3:00 p.m., −		vs. Texas State; Louisiana Tech MTE	W 59–48	5–1	15 – A. Collum	11 – A. Collum	4 – O. Cooper	Thomas Assembly Center (132); Ruston, LA
November 22, 2023*; 3:00 p.m., ESPN+		at Louisiana Tech; Louisiana Tech MTE	L 62–71	5–2	15 – C. Shumate	7 – A. Collum	5 – S. Wells	Thomas Assembly Center (2,012); Ruston, LA
November 28, 2023*; 7:00 p.m., ESPN+		at UAB	W 81–60	6–2	36 – S. Wells	21 – C. Shumate	7 – O. Cooper	Bartow Arena (2,976); Birmingham, AL
December 2, 2023*; 2:00 p.m., ESPN+		UT Martin	W 91–80	7–2	25 – S. Wells	8 – S. Wells	6 – S. Wells	The Legacy Center (2,269); Lake Charles, LA
December 5, 2023*; 7:00 p.m., −		Mississippi University for Women	W 92–23	8–2	15 – D. Richards Jr.	8 – N. Mann	10 – O. Cooper	The Legacy Center (2,073); Lake Charles, LA
December 13, 2023*; 7:00 p.m., ESPN+		Southern Miss	W 67–48	9–2	24 – D. Richards Jr.	14 – A. Collum	4 – S. Wells	The Legacy Center (3,494); Lake Charles, LA
December 17, 2023*; 3:00 p.m., ESPN+		Louisiana	W 74–72	10–2	18 – S. Wells	8 – S. Wells	5 – S. Wells	The Legacy Center (4,300); Lake Charles, LA
December 29, 2023*; 6:00 p.m., BTN		at Michigan	W 87–76	11–2	30 – S. Wells	10 – S. Wells	6 – S. Wells	Crisler Center (12,588); Ann Arbor, MI
Southland Conference regular season
January 6, 2024; 1:00 p.m., ESPN+		at Texas A&M–Commerce	W 73–67	12–2 (1–0)	25 – S. Wells	10 – S. Wells	5 – O. Cooper	The Field House (446); Commerce, TX
January 8, 2024; 6:30 p.m., ESPN+		at Northwestern State	W 68–59	13–2 (2–0)	18 – S. Wells	10 – C. Shumate	5 – S. Wells	Prather Coliseum (1,035); Natchitoches, LA
January 13, 2024; 4:00 p.m., ESPN+		Southeastern Louisiana	W 74–65	14–2 (3–0)	22 – J. Garcia	11 – C. Shumate	7 – S. Well	The Legacy Center (4,200); Lake Charles, LA
January 15, 2024; 7:00 p.m., ESPN+		Lamar; Battle of the Border (Rivalry)	W 88–69	15–2 (4–0)	21 – C. Shumate	15 – C. Shumate	9 – S. Wells	The Legacy Center (3,487); Lake Charles, LA
January 20, 2024; 5:00 p.m., ESPN+		at Incarnate Word	W 80–66	16–2 (5–0)	20 – M. Saunders Jr.	7 – C. Shumate	6 – S. Wells	McDermott Center (376); San Antonio, TX
January 22, 2024; 6:00 p.m., ESPN		at Texas A&M–Corpus Christi	W 62–61	17–2 (6–0)	12 – D. Richards Jr.	13 – C. Shumate	2 – tied (2)	American Bank Center (2,416); Corpus Christi, TX
January 27, 2024; 4:00 p.m., ESPN+		New Orleans	W 102–65	18–2 (7–0)	20 – S. Wells	7 – C. Shumate	8 – S. Wells	The Legacy Center (4,200); Lake Charles, LA
January 29, 2024; 7:00 p.m., ESPN+		Northwestern State	W 89–65	19–2 (8–0)	15 – C. Shumate	8 – C. Shumate	5 – S. Wells	The Legacy Center (4,058); Lake Charles, LA
February 3, 2024; 3:30 p.m., ESPN+		at Southeastern Louisiana	L 74–77	19–3 (8–1)	16 – C. Felder	8 – C. Shumate	6 – J. Garcia	Pride Roofing University Center (1,043); Hammond, LA
February 5, 2024; 7:00 p.m., ESPN+		Texas A&M–Commerce	W 77–51	20–3 (9–1)	16 – S. Wells	7 – C. Shumate	5 – M. Saunders Jr.	The Legacy Center (3,703); Lake Charles, LA
February 10, 2024; 4:00 p.m., ESPN+		Texas A&M–Corpus Christi	W 74–67	21–3 (10–1)	14 – A. Collum	13 – C. Shumate	7 – S. Wells	The Legacy Center (4,324); Lake Charles, LA
February 12, 2024; 7:00 p.m., ESPN+		at Houston Christian	W 105–54	22–3 (11–1)	16 – D. Richards Jr.	10 – C. Shumate	6 – S. Wells	Sharp Gymnasium (924); Houston, TX
February 17, 2024; 3:00 p.m., ESPN+		at Nicholls	W 74–47	23–3 (12–1)	12 – C. Shumate	12 – C. Shumate	5 – S. Wells	Stopher Gymnasium (1,100); Thibodaux, LA
February 24, 2024; 4:00 p.m., ESPN+		Incarnate Word	W 87–71	24–3 (13–1)	18 – C. Shumate	10 – C. Shumate	7 – S. Wells	The Legacy Center (4,213); Lake Charles, LA
February 26, 2024; 7:00 p.m., ESPN+		at Lamar; Battle of the Border (Rivalry)	W 58–56	25–3 (14–1)	23 – S. Wells	8 – A. Collum	2 – tied (3)	Neches Arena; Beaumont, TX
March 2, 2024; 4:00 p.m., ESPN+		Nicholls	W 83–62	26–3 (15–1)	17 – J. Garcia	13 – C. Shumate	6 – S. Welss	The Legacy Center (4,211); Lake Charles, LA
March 4, 2024; 7:00 p.m., ESPN+		Houston Christian	W 87–69	27–3 (16–1)	24 – S. Wells	11 – C. Felder	6 – S. Wells	The Legacy Center (3,373); Lake Charles, LA
March 6, 2024; 7:00 p.m., ESPN+		at New Orleans	W 81–57	28–3 (17–1)	15 – tied (3)	16 – C. Shumate	4 – A. Collum	Lakefront Arena (959); New Orleans, LA
Southland tournament
March 12, 2024; 5:30 p.m., ESPNU	(1)	(4) Lamar; Semifinals	W 76–57	29–3	27 – Wells	7 – Shumate	5 – Wells	The Legacy Center (4,200); Lake Charles, LA
March 13, 2024; 4:00 p.m., ESPN2	(1)	(3) Nicholls; Championship	W 92–76	30–3	27 – Wells	6 – Shumate	6 – Wells	The Legacy Center (4,200); Lake Charles, LA
NCAA tournament
March 21, 2024; 6:25 p.m., TBS	(12 MW)	vs. (5 MW) No. 18 Gonzaga; First round	L 65–86	30–4	19 – tied (2)	11 – C. Shumate	3 – D. Richards Jr.	Delta Center; Salt Lake City, UT
*Non-conference game. ^{#}Rankings from AP poll. (#) Tournament seedings in parentheses. MW=Midwest. All times are in Central.

== Conference awards and honors ==
=== Weekly awards ===
Weekly honors
Honors	Player	Position	Date awarded	Ref.
SLC Men's Basketball Player of the Week	Shahada Wells	G	December 4, 2023	
SLC Men's Basketball Player of the Week	DJ Richards Jr.	G	December 18, 2023	
SLC Men's Basketball Player of the Week	Shahada Wells	G	January 2, 2024	

== See also ==
- 2023–24 McNeese Cowgirls basketball team
