= Javan Felix =

American basketball player (born 1994)

New Orleans Privateers
- Position: Assistant coach
- League: Southland Conference

Personal information
- Born: July 28, 1994 (age 32) New Orleans, Louisiana, U.S.
- Listed height: 5 ft 11 in (1.80 m)
- Listed weight: 195 lb (88 kg)

Career information
- High school: St. Augustine (New Orleans, Louisiana)
- College: Texas (2012–2016)
- NBA draft: 2016: undrafted
- Playing career: 2017–2020
- Coaching career: 2021–present

Career history

Playing
- 2017: KK Gorica
- 2017–2018: Oklahoma City Blue
- 2019–2020: South Bay Lakers

Coaching
- 2021–2023: Loyola New Orleans (assistant)
- 2023–present: New Orleans (assistant)

Javan Rodd Felix (born July 28, 1994) is an American men's basketball coach and former player. He is currently an assistant coach at New Orleans. He played college basketball for Texas.

== High school career ==
Felix attended St. Augustine High School in New Orleans, Louisiana. Along with Craig Victor, he led the school to the 2011 state championship. Felix was considered to be one of top prospects in Louisiana from the Class of 2012 and committed to Texas, saying it had been "my dream school for me for a long time."

== College career ==
Felix started his first two seasons at Texas and became known for his three-point shooting. He suffered three concussions in a 12-month span, which made coaches more cautious about playing him. Even so, he averaged 11.6 points per game as a sophomore. As a junior, Felix posted averages of 13.7 points, 2.2 boards, and 2.0 assists per game. On December 12, 2015, Felix hit the game-winning jump shot at the buzzer in an 84–82 upset of No. 3 North Carolina and scored a game-high 25 points, shooting 9-of-14 (.643) from the floor. As a result, he was named Big 12 Player of the Week and Oscar Robertson National Player of the Week by the U.S. Basketball Writers Association. As a senior, he averaged 10.7 points, 1.8 rebounds, and 2.2 assists per game. Felix was an Honorable Mention All-Big 12 selection as a senior.

== Professional career ==
After not being selected in the 2016 NBA draft, in January 2017 he signed with KK Gorica of Croatia's A-1 Liga. In October 2017 he signed with the Oklahoma City Blue of the NBA G League. For the 2019–20 season, Felix joined the South Bay Lakers of the G League. On January 26, 2020, Felix scored 30 points. He averaged 8.8 points and 3.2 assists per game.

== Coaching career ==
In August 2021, Felix was hired as an assistant coach at Loyola University New Orleans under head coach Stacey Hollowell, a role in which he held for two seasons, helping them win a NAIA national championship in 2022. In July 2023, Felix was hired as an assistant men's basketball coach at the University of New Orleans.
