= 2025–26 Iowa State Cyclones men's basketball team =

American college basketball season

2025–26 Iowa State Cyclones men's basketball

NCAA tournament, Sweet Sixteen
- Conference: Big 12 Conference

Ranking
- Coaches: No. 8
- AP: No. 8
- Record: 29–8 (12–6 Big 12)
- Head coach: T. J. Otzelberger (5th season)
- Assistant coaches: JR Blount; Kyle Green; Nate Schmidt; Erik Crawford; Diante Garrett
- Home arena: Hilton Coliseum

2025–26 Big 12 men's basketball standings
	Conf.				Overall
Team	W		L	PCT	W		L	PCT
No. 3 Arizona †	16	–	2	.889	36	–	3	.923
No. 7 Houston	14	–	4	.778	30	–	7	.811
No. 20 Kansas	12	–	6	.667	24	–	11	.686
No. 21 Texas Tech	12	–	6	.667	23	–	11	.676
No. 8 Iowa State	12	–	6	.667	29	–	8	.784
TCU	11	–	7	.611	23	–	12	.657
West Virginia	9	–	9	.500	21	–	14	.600
UCF	9	–	9	.500	21	–	12	.636
Cincinnati	9	–	9	.500	18	–	15	.545
BYU	9	–	9	.500	23	–	12	.657
Colorado	7	–	11	.389	17	–	16	.515
Arizona State	7	–	11	.389	17	–	16	.515
Baylor	6	–	12	.333	17	–	17	.500
Oklahoma State	6	–	12	.333	20	–	15	.571
Kansas State	3	–	15	.167	12	–	20	.375
Utah	2	–	16	.111	10	–	22	.313
† 2026 Big 12 tournament winner Rankings from AP poll

The 2025–26 Iowa State Cyclones men's basketball team represented Iowa State University during the 2025–26 NCAA Division I men's basketball season. The Cyclones were led by T. J. Otzelberger in his fifth season as head coach. They played their home games at Hilton Coliseum in Ames, Iowa as members of the Big 12 Conference. In the NCAA tournament they advanced to the Sweet Sixteen, but All American Joshua Jefferson suffered an injury in the first round, similar to Georges Niang's season ending injury in the first round of 2014.

== Previous season ==
The Cyclones finished the 2024–25 season 25–10, 13–7 in Big 12 play to finish in fifth place. As the No. 5 seed in the Big 12 tournament, they defeated the No. 13 seed Cincinnati in the second round before losing in the quarterfinals to No. 4 seed BYU. They received an at-large bid to the NCAA tournament as a No. 3 seed in the South region. They defeated 14 seed Lipscomb before losing to No. 6 seed Ole Miss in the second round. On January 13, the Cyclones reached #2 in the AP Poll, which was the highest ranking in program history.

== Offseason ==
=== Departures ===
Iowa State departures
Name	Number	Pos.	Height	Weight	Year	Hometown	Reason for departure
Dishon Jackson	1	C	6'11"	260	(redshirt) Senior	Oakland, CA	Transferred to Pittsburgh
Demarion Watson	4	G	6'7"	215	Junior	Minneapolis, MN	Transferred to North Texas
Curtis Jones	5	G	6'4"	175	Senior	Minneapolis, MN	Graduated/undrafted in 2025 NBA draft; signed with the Denver Nuggets
Keshon Gilbert	10	G	6'4"	190	Senior	St. Louis, MO	Graduated
Kayden Fish	11	F	6'6"	250	(redshirt) Freshman	Kansas City, MO	Transferred to Ball State
Nojus Indrusaitis	15	G	6'5"	200	Freshman	Chicago, IL	Transferred to Pittsburgh
Conrad Hawley	23	F	6'5"	220	Senior	Raymore, MO	Walk-on; graduated
JT Rock	30	C	7'1"	245	(redshirt) Freshman	Sioux Falls, SD	Transferred to New Mexico
Brandton Chatfield	33	F	6'10"	260	(redshirt) Senior	Orofino, ID	Graduated

=== Incoming transfers ===
Iowa State incoming transfers
Name	Num	Pos.	Height	Weight	Year	Hometown	Previous school
Mason Williams	2	G	6'5"	180	Junior	Seattle, WA	Eastern Washington
Eric Mulder	4	G	6'8"	225	Senior	Oskaloosa, IA	Purdue Fort Wayne
Dominick Nelson	11	G	6'5"	180	Senior	Miami, FL	Utah Valley
Blake Buchanan	23	F	6'11"	225	Junior	Coeur D'Alene, ID	Virginia

== Recruiting ==
=== 2025 recruiting class ===
College recruiting
Name	Hometown	School	Height	Weight	Commit date
Jamarion Batemon #10 SG	Milwaukee, WI	Milwaukee Academy of Sciences	6 ft 3 in (1.91 m)	175 lb (79 kg)	Jul 1, 2024
Jamarion Batemon #10 SG	Recruit ratings: Rivals: 247Sports: ESPN: (83)				
Xzavion Mitchell #13 PF	Oshkosh, WI	Oshkosh North High School	6 ft 7 in (2.01 m)	215 lb (98 kg)	Mar 23, 2024
Xzavion Mitchell #13 PF	Recruit ratings: Rivals: 247Sports: ESPN: (82)				
Killyan Toure #37 SG	Wolfeboro, NH	Brewster Academy	6 ft 3 in (1.91 m)	190 lb (86 kg)	Oct 12, 2024
Killyan Toure #37 SG	Recruit ratings: Rivals: 247Sports: ESPN: (81)				
Dominykas Pleta; PF	Germany	N/A	6 ft 9 in (2.06 m)	210 lb (95 kg)	Feb 14, 2025
Dominykas Pleta; PF	Recruit ratings: Rivals: 247Sports: ESPN: (NR)				
Overall recruit ranking:
Note: In many cases, Scout, Rivals, 247Sports, On3, and ESPN may conflict in their listings of height and weight.; In these cases, the average was taken. ESPN grades are on a 100-point scale.; Sources: "2025 Iowa State Basketball Commitments". Rivals.; "2025 Iowa State Cyclones Recruiting Class". Scout.; "2025 Iowa State Basketball Commits". ESPN.; "Scout.com Team Recruiting Rankings". Scout.; "2025 Team Ranking". Rivals.

=== 2026 recruiting class ===
College recruiting (2026)
Name	Hometown	School	Height	Weight	Commit date
Yusef Gray Jr. #13 SG	West Allis, WI	West Allis Central High School	6 ft 3 in (1.91 m)	175 lb (79 kg)	Jan 19, 2025
Yusef Gray Jr. #13 SG	Recruit ratings: Rivals: 247Sports: ESPN: (82)				
Christian Wiggins; SG	Minneapolis, MN	Wayzata High School	6 ft 4 in (1.93 m)	180 lb (82 kg)	Apr 19, 2025
Christian Wiggins; SG	Recruit ratings: Rivals: 247Sports: ESPN: (NR)				
Overall recruit ranking:
Note: In many cases, Scout, Rivals, 247Sports, On3, and ESPN may conflict in their listings of height and weight.; In these cases, the average was taken. ESPN grades are on a 100-point scale.; Sources: "2026 Iowa State Basketball Commitments". Rivals.; "2026 Iowa State Cyclones Recruiting Class". Scout.; "2026 Iowa State Basketball Commits". ESPN.; "Scout.com Team Recruiting Rankings". Scout.; "2026 Team Ranking". Rivals.

== Roster ==
2025–26 Iowa State Cyclones men's basketball team
Players
Coaches

Pos.	#	Name	Height	Weight	Year	Previous school	Hometown
G	0	Nate Heise	6 ft 5 in (1.96 m)	212 lb (96 kg)	GS	Northern Iowa	Lake City, Minnesota
G	1	Jamarion Batemon	6 ft 3 in (1.91 m)	185 lb (84 kg)	Fr	Milwaukee Academy of Science	Milwaukee, Wisconsin
G	2	Mason Williams	6 ft 5 in (1.96 m)	182 lb (83 kg)	Jr	Eastern Washington	Seattle, Washington
G	3	Tamin Lipsey	6 ft 1 in (1.85 m)	200 lb (91 kg)	Sr	Ames High School	Ames, Iowa
G	4	Eric Mulder	6 ft 9 in (2.06 m)	218 lb (99 kg)	Sr	Purdue Fort Wayne	Oskaloosa, Iowa
F	5	Joshua Jefferson	6 ft 9 in (2.06 m)	240 lb (109 kg)	Sr	Christ the King	Las Vegas, Nevada
G	7	Anthony Rise (W)	6 ft 0 in (1.83 m)	165 lb (75 kg)	Fr	Brookfield Central	Milwaukee, Wisconsin
G	11	Dominick Nelson	6 ft 5 in (1.96 m)	175 lb (79 kg)	Sr	Utah Valley	Miami, Florida
G	13	Cade Kelderman (W)	6 ft 1 in (1.85 m)	185 lb (84 kg)	Jr	Waukee Northwest	Waukee, Iowa
F	21	Dominykas Pleta	6 ft 11 in (2.11 m)	235 lb (107 kg)	Fr	Arnoldi Gymnasium	Gotha, Germany
F	22	Milan Momcilovic	6 ft 8 in (2.03 m)	225 lb (102 kg)	Jr	Pewaukee	Pewaukee, Wisconsin
F	23	Blake Buchanan	6 ft 10 in (2.08 m)	225 lb (102 kg)	Jr	Virginia	Coeur d'Alene, Idaho
G	27	Killyan Toure	6 ft 3 in (1.91 m)	193 lb (88 kg)	Fr	Brewster Academy	Pamiers, France
F	55	Xzavion Mitchell	6 ft 6 in (1.98 m)	200 lb (91 kg)	Fr	North	Oshkosh, Wisconsin

Head coach

- T. J. Otzelberger (UW–Whitewater)

Assistant coach(es)

- J.R. Blount (Loyola Chicago)
- Kyle Green (Hamline)
- Nate Schmidt (Denison)
- Erik Crawford (Northern Iowa)
- Diante Garrett (Iowa State)

Legend

- (C) Team captain
- (S) Suspended
- (I) Ineligible
- (W) Walk-on
- Injured
- Current redshirt

Roster

== Schedule and results ==
Date time, TV	Rank^{#}	Opponent^{#}	Result	Record	High points	High rebounds	High assists	Site (attendance) city, state
Exhibition
October 17, 2025*; 7:30 p.m., NPM	No. 16	at No. 23 Creighton	L 58–71	-	18 – Jefferson	12 – Jefferson	2 – Momcilovic	CHI Health Center Omaha (15,571); Omaha, NE
October 26, 2025*; 12:00 p.m., ESPN+	No. 16	Northwestern	W 80–72	-	19 – Heise	7 – Jefferson	5 – Toure	Hilton Coliseum (13,560); Ames, IA
Non-conference regular season
November 3, 2025*; 7:00 p.m., ESPN+	No. 16	Fairleigh Dickinson	W 88–50	1–0	29 – Momcilovic	10 – Jefferson	5 – Lipsey	Hilton Coliseum (13,332); Ames, IA
November 6, 2025*; 7:00 p.m., ESPN+	No. 16	Grambling State	W 102–62	2–0	20 – Jefferson	9 – Buchanan	6 – Lipsey	Hilton Coliseum (13,609); Ames, IA
November 10, 2025*; 7:00 p.m., ESPNU	No. 16	vs. Mississippi State	W 96–80	3–0	25 – Lipsey	6 – Buchanan	6 – Lipsey	Sanford Pentagon (3,426); Sioux Falls, SD
November 17, 2025*; 7:00 p.m., ESPN+	No. 16	Stonehill	W 96–57	4–0	23 – Tied	9 – Jefferson	7 – Jefferson	Hilton Coliseum (13,416); Ames, IA
November 24, 2025*; 3:30 p.m., TruTV	No. 15	vs. No. 14 St. John's; Players Era Festival Group Stage	W 83–82	5–0	23 – Momcilovic	8 – Jefferson	5 – Lipsey	Michelob Ultra Arena; Paradise, NV
November 25, 2025*; 1:00 p.m., TruTV	No. 15	vs. Creighton; Players Era Festival Group Stage	W 78–60	6–0	20 – Toure	10 – Jefferson	6 – Heise	Michelob Ultra Arena; Paradise, NV
November 26, 2025*; 12:00 p.m., TNT	No. 15	vs. Syracuse; Players Era Festival Consolation Game	W 95–64	7–0	24 – Momcliovic	6 – Jefferson	10 – Jefferson	MGM Grand Garden Arena; Paradise, NV
December 3, 2025*; 7:00 p.m., ESPN+	No. 10	Alcorn State	W 132–68	8–0	27 – Momcliovic	5 – Pleta	10 – Jefferson	Hilton Coliseum (13,429); Ames, IA
December 6, 2025*; 11:00 a.m., CBS	No. 10	at No. 1 Purdue	W 81–58	9–0	20 – Momcilovic	9 – Buchanan	8 – Lipsey	Mackey Arena (14,876); West Lafayette, IN
December 11, 2025*; 7:00 p.m., FS1	No. 4	Iowa; Rivalry/Iowa Corn Cy-Hawk Series	W 66–62	10–0	24 – Jefferson	6 – Buchanan	4 – Lipsey	Hilton Coliseum (14,267); Ames, IA
December 14, 2025*; 12:00 p.m., ESPN+	No. 4	Eastern Illinois	W 77–53	11–0	18 – Momcilovic	9 – Jefferson	7 – Lipsey	Hilton Coliseum (13,876); Ames, IA
December 21, 2025*; 5:00 p.m., ESPN+	No. 4	Long Beach State	W 91–60	12–0	27 – Momcilovic	13 – Buchanan	7 – Lipsey	Hilton Coliseum (14,267); Ames, IA
December 29, 2025*; 7:00 p.m., ESPN+	No. 3	Houston Christian	W 89–61	13–0	23 – Jefferson	9 – Buchanan	5 – Jefferson	Hilton Coliseum (14,267); Ames, IA
Big 12
January 2, 2026; 8:00 p.m., ESPN2	No. 3	West Virginia	W 80–59	14–0 (1–0)	26 – Momcilovic	10 – Jefferson	10 – Jefferson	Hilton Coliseum (14,267); Ames, IA
January 7, 2026; 7:00 p.m., Peacock	No. 3	at Baylor	W 70–60	15–0 (2–0)	24 – Lipsey	16 – Jefferson	3 – Tied	Foster Pavilion (7,287); Waco, TX
January 10, 2026; 3:00 p.m., ESPN2	No. 3	Oklahoma State	W 83–71	16–0 (3–0)	19 – Jefferson	7 – Toure	5 – Tied	Hilton Coliseum (14,267); Ames, IA
January 13, 2026; 8:00 p.m., ESPN	No. 2	at Kansas	L 63–84	16–1 (3–1)	12 – Tied	8 – Jefferson	5 – Lipsey	Allen Fieldhouse (15,300); Lawrence, KS
January 17, 2026; 1:00 p.m., Peacock	No. 2	at Cincinnati	L 70–79	16–2 (3–2)	34 – Momcilovic	9 – Jefferson	5 – Jefferson	Fifth Third Arena (10,551); Cincinnati, OH
January 20, 2026; 6:00 p.m., CBSSN	No. 9	UCF	W 87–57	17–2 (4–2)	20 – Momcilovic	10 – Jefferson	12 – Jefferson	Hilton Coliseum (14,267); Ames, IA
January 24, 2026; 3:00 p.m., Peacock	No. 9	at Oklahoma State	W 84–71	18–2 (5–2)	29 – Momcilovic	9 – Buchanan	5 – Lipsey	Gallagher-Iba Arena (6,280); Stillwater, OK
January 29, 2026; 6:00 p.m., FS1	No. 8	Colorado	W 97–67	19–2 (6–2)	17 – Batemon	8 – Heise	5 – Tied	Hilton Coliseum (14,267); Ames, IA
February 1, 2026; 1:00 p.m., FOX	No. 8	at Kansas State	W 95–61	20–2 (7–2)	19 – Jefferson	8 – Jefferson	9 – Lipsey	Bramlage Coliseum (8,031); Manhattan, KS
February 7, 2026; 1:00 p.m., ESPN	No. 7	Baylor	W 72–69	21–2 (8–2)	21 – Momcilovic	9 – Lipsey	4 – Jefferson	Hilton Coliseum (14,267); Ames, IA
February 10, 2026; 8:00 p.m., FS1	No. 5	at TCU	L 55–62	21–3 (8–3)	12 – Tied	7 – Jefferson	9 – Jefferson	Schollmaier Arena (4,944); Fort Worth, TX
February 14, 2026; 12:00 p.m., ABC	No. 5	No. 9 Kansas	W 74–56	22–3 (9–3)	18 – Momcilovic	6 – Buchanan	4 – Tied	Hilton Coliseum (14,267); Ames, IA
February 16, 2026; 8:00 p.m., ESPN	No. 6	No. 2 Houston	W 70–67	23–3 (10–3)	12 – Jefferson	8 – Lipsey	5 – Jefferson	Hilton Coliseum (14,267); Ames, IA
February 21, 2026; 9:30 p.m., ESPN	No. 6	at No. 23 BYU	L 69–75	23–4 (10–4)	19 – Lipsey	8 – Jefferson	7 – Jefferson	Marriott Center (18,046); Provo, UT
February 24, 2026; 8:00 p.m., FS1	No. 4	at Utah	W 75–59	24–4 (11–4)	21 – Jefferson	6 – Jefferson	5 – Lipsey	Jon M. Huntsman Center (6,867); Salt Lake City, UT
February 28, 2026; 3:00 p.m., CBS	No. 4	No. 16 Texas Tech	L 73–82	24–5 (11–5)	22 – Jefferson	11 – Buchanan	5 – Jefferson	Hilton Coliseum (14,267); Ames, IA
March 2, 2026; 8:00 p.m., ESPN	No. 6	at No. 2 Arizona	L 57–73	24–6 (11–6)	17 – Lipsey	8 – Jefferson	2 – Tied	McKale Center (14,688); Tucson, AZ
March 7, 2026; 1:00 p.m., FS1	No. 6	Arizona State	W 86–65	25–6 (12–6)	16 – Tied	7 – Jefferson	6 – Lipsey	Hilton Coliseum (14,267); Ames, IA
Big 12 Tournament
March 11, 2026; 11:30 a.m., ESPN	(5) No. 7	vs. (12) Arizona State; Second round	W 91–42	26−6	21 – Momcilovic	14 – Jefferson	4 – Tied	T-Mobile Center (12,477); Kansas City, MO
March 12, 2026; 11:30 a.m., ESPN	(5) No. 7	vs. (4) No. 16 Texas Tech; Quarterfinal	W 75–53	27−6	20 – Lipsey	13 – Jefferson	6 – Jefferson	T-Mobile Center (14,745); Kansas City, MO
March 13, 2026; 6:00 p.m., ESPN	(5) No. 7	vs. (1) No. 2 Arizona; Semifinal	L 80–82	27−7	28 – Momcilovic	5 – Momcilovic	5 – Lipsey	T-Mobile Center (19,450); Kansas City, MO
NCAA Tournament
March 20, 2026; 1:50 p.m., CBS	(2 MW) No. 6	vs. (15 MW) Tennessee State; First round	W 108–74	28–7	25 – Toure	11 – Toure	8 – Buchanan	Enterprise Center (17,192); St. Louis, MO
March 22, 2026; 1:45 p.m., CBS	(2 MW) No. 6	vs. (7 MW) Kentucky; Second round	W 82–63	29–7	26 – Lipsey	8 – Buchanan	10 – Lipsey	Enterprise Center (16,348); St. Louis, MO
March 27, 2026*; 9:10 p.m., TBS/truTV	(2 MW) No. 6	vs. (6 MW) No. 23 Tennessee; Sweet Sixteen	L 62–76	29–8	18 – Tied	5 – Tied	5 – Lipsey	United Center (21,508); Chicago, IL
*Non-conference game. ^{#}Rankings from AP poll. (#) Tournament seedings in parentheses. MW=Midwest. All times are in Central Time.

== Rankings ==
Ranking movements Legend: ██ Increase in ranking ██ Decrease in ranking ( ) = First-place votes
	Week																				
Poll	Pre	1	2	3	4	5	6	7	8	9	10	11	12	13	14	15	16	17	18	19	Final
AP	16	16	16	15	10	4 (1)	4 (1)	3 (1)	3 (1)	3	2 (1)	9	8	7	5	6	4	6	7	6	8
Coaches	18	16	14	13	9	4 (1)	4	3	3	3	2 (1)	9	9	7	4	6	5	7	7	6	8
