= 2026–27 Utah Valley Wolverines men's basketball team =

Intercollegiate basketball season

2026–27 Utah Valley Wolverines men's basketball
- Conference: Big West Conference
- Record: 4–0 (0–0 Big West)
- Head coach: Todd Phillips (4th season)
- Associate head coach: Todd Okeson (8th season)
- Assistant coaches: Andrew May (1st season); Ivory "Trey" Young (2nd season) Trevor Stranger (2nd season)
- Home arena: UCCU Center (Capacity: 8,500)

2026–27 Big West men's basketball standings
| | Conf. | | | | Overall |
| Team | W | | L | PCT | W | | L | PCT |
|---|---|---|---|---|---|---|---|---|
| UC Santa Barbara | 0 | – | 0 | – | 5 | – | 0 | 1.000 |
| Cal State Bakersfield | 0 | – | 0 | – | 4 | – | 0 | 1.000 |
| Utah Valley | 0 | – | 0 | – | 3 | – | 0 | 1.000 |
| UC Irvine | 0 | – | 0 | – | 3 | – | 1 | .750 |
| UC San Diego | 0 | – | 0 | – | 3 | – | 1 | .750 |
| UC Riverside | 0 | – | 0 | – | 3 | – | 2 | .600 |
| Cal State Fullerton | 0 | – | 0 | – | 2 | – | 2 | .500 |
| Cal Poly | 0 | – | 0 | – | 2 | – | 3 | .400 |
| Cal State Northridge | 0 | – | 0 | – | 1 | – | 3 | .250 |
| Sacramento State | 0 | – | 0 | – | 1 | – | 3 | .250 |
| Long Beach State | 0 | – | 0 | – | 1 | – | 3 | .250 |
| California Baptist | 0 | – | 0 | – | 1 | – | 4 | .200 |
† 2027 Big West tournament winner As of November 21, 2026; Rankings from AP poll

The 2026–27 Utah Valley Wolverines men's basketball team represents Utah Valley University in the 2026–27 NCAA Division I men's basketball season. The Wolverines, led by fourth-year head coach Todd Phillips, play their home games at the UCCU Center in Orem, Utah and compete as members of the Big West Conference.

This will be the Wolverines' first season in the Big West. In March 2025, the Big West Conference reportedly invited Utah Valley to join their conference beginning in 2026. UVU's Big West move was officially announced on June 4, 2025. California Baptist also joins the Big West Conference from the WAC while Sacramento State joins from the Big Sky Conference. For the 2026–27 season, the Big West competes with 12 members as UC Davis and Hawaii depart for the Mountain West Conference in 2026 while UC San Diego and UC Santa Barbara depart for the West Coast Conference in 2027.

== Previous season ==
The Wolverines finished the 2025–26 season 25–9, 14–4 in WAC play, to finish in first place in the Western Athletic Conference. As the No. 1 seed in the WAC tournament, they defeated UT Arlington in the semifinals before falling to California Baptist in the championship game 61–63. As the WAC regular season champions, Utah Valley was invited to participate in the 2026 National Invitation Tournament. The Wolverines were defeated in the first round by George Washington 78–79.

== Offseason ==
=== Departures ===
| Name | Position | Height | Year | Reason for departure† |
|---|---|---|---|---|
| Noah Taitz | G | 6' 4" | Senior | Graduated, transferred to Lindenwood |
| Hayden Welling | F | 6' 9" | Senior | Graduated |
| Trevan Leonhardt | G | 6' 4" | Redshirt Junior | Transferred to Nebraska |
| Jackson Holcombe | G | 6' 6" | Redshirt Junior | Transferred to Utah |
| Tyler Hendricks | G | 6' 6" | Redshirt Senior | Transferred to Oklahoma |
| AJ Riggs | G | 6' 3" | Junior | Transferred to Hawaii-Hilo |
| Joul Karram | C | 6' 9" | Senior | Transferred to Binghamton |

† The 2026 transfer portal window officially is from April 7–21, however, many players declared their intent to enter the transfer portal before the official open date.

=== Incoming transfers ===
| Name | Position | Height | Year | Previous school/team |
|---|---|---|---|---|
| Jordy Barnes | G | 6' 4" | Junior | Utah State |
| Tanner Davis | G | 6' 4" | Sophomore | Utah Tech |
| Sebastian Muchitsch | F | 6' 8" | Junior | Barton Community College |
| Modestas Babraitis | G | 6' 4" | Freshman | Jonavos Cbet (Lithuanian Basketball League) |
| Jovan Nekic | F | 6' 10" | Freshman | KK Dynamic (Serbian Basketball League) |
| Dominick Nelson | G | 6' 5" | Fifth Year | Iowa State, Utah Valley, Polk State College |

=== Incoming freshman ===
| Name | Position | Height | High school | Hometown | Notes |
|---|---|---|---|---|---|
| Logan Haustveit | G | 5' 10" | Owyhee High School | Meridian, ID | Will join team in 2028 after two-year mission |
| Mason Hansen | G | 6' 0" | Springville High School | Springville, UT | Will join team in 2028 after two-year mission; son of former UVU and NBA player Travis Hansen |
| Omar Mowafak | F | 6' 8" | Layton Christian Academy | Layton, UT | |
| Deng Deng | F | 6' 10" | Juan Diego High School | Salt Lake City, UT | |
| John Southwick | G | 6' 3" | Utah Prep | Richfield, UT | Will join team in 2027 after two-year mission |

=== Secret scrimmage ===
Prior to the start of the season, on October 3, 2026, UVU hosted the University of Idaho Vandals from the Big Sky Conference for a closed or "secret scrimmage" held at their practice facility adjacent to the UCCU Center. Limited photos and videos of the game were released through university social media channels. Coach Phillips noted during basketball media days held on October 28 at Topgolf in Vineyard, Utah that the team had played a second closed scrimmage in the preseason against an undisclosed opponent. Also at basketball media days, it was announced that the basketball program had hired its first general manager Adam Fife.

=== Player eligibility ===
Todd Phillips indicated in a post game radio interview after the opening game against Western Colorado on November 2 that Jovan Nekic was ruled ineligible by the NCAA for the first 6 games of the season likely due to his professional play in Europe prior to the start of his collegiate career at UVU.

== Roster ==
2026–27 Utah Valley Wolverines men's basketball team
Players
Coaches

| Pos. | # | Name | Height | Weight | Year | Previous school | Hometown |
|---|---|---|---|---|---|---|---|
| F | 0 | Isaac Davis | 6 ft 8 in (2.03 m) | 240 lb (109 kg) | Jr | Hillcrest HS; Utah State | Idaho Falls, ID |
| G | 1 | Tanner Davis | 6 ft 4 in (1.93 m) | 175 lb (79 kg) | So | Sky View HS; Utah Tech | Smithfield, UT |
| G | 2 | Jordy Barnes | 6 ft 4 in (1.93 m) | 185 lb (84 kg) | Jr | Olympus HS; Utah State | Salt Lake City, UT |
| G | 3 | Dominick Nelson | 6 ft 5 in (1.96 m) | 190 lb (86 kg) | | Liberty Heights Athletic Institute; Polk State; Utah Valley; Iowa State | Miami, FL |
| G | 4 | Sherman Weatherspoon IV | 6 ft 3 in (1.91 m) | 180 lb (82 kg) | Sr | Bethesda-Chevy Chase HS; Valparaiso; Frank Phillips | Bowie, MD |
| F | 5 | Omar Mowafak | 6 ft 8 in (2.03 m) | 210 lb (95 kg) | Fr | Layton Christian Academy | Cairo, Egypt |
| F | 6 | Deng Deng | 6 ft 10 in (2.08 m) | 190 lb (86 kg) | Fr | Juan Diego Catholic HS | Salt Lake City, UT |
| F | 7 | Sebastian Muchitsch | 6 ft 8 in (2.03 m) | 230 lb (104 kg) | Jr | Holy Trinity Secondary; Barton CC | Crawley, England |
| G | 8 | Modestas Babraitis | 6 ft 4 in (1.93 m) | 200 lb (91 kg) | Fr | Jonavos Cbet | Fort Myers, FL |
| G | 9 | Braden Housley | 6 ft 4 in (1.93 m) | 180 lb (82 kg) | RS Jr | Skyridge HS; Southern Utah; Utah State | Lehi, UT |
| F | 10 | Jovan Nekic | 6 ft 10 in (2.08 m) | 235 lb (107 kg) | Fr | KK Dynamic | Belgrade, Serbia |
| F | 11 | Tyler Weaver | 6 ft 7 in (2.01 m) | 175 lb (79 kg) | RS So | Aliso Niguel HS | Aliso Viejo, CA |
| F | 12 | Tyler Medaris (W) | 6 ft 7 in (2.01 m) | 205 lb (93 kg) | RS So | Middleton, HS | Middleton, ID |
| G | 13 | Jaxson Roberts | 6 ft 2 in (1.88 m) | 165 lb (75 kg) | RS Fr | Corner Canyon HS | Draper, UT |
| F | 23 | Isaac Hawkins | 6 ft 10 in (2.08 m) | 195 lb (88 kg) | Sr | Legion Collegiate Academy; College of Southern Idaho | Fort Mill, SC |
| G/F | 24 | AJ Dixon | 6 ft 5 in (1.96 m) | 205 lb (93 kg) | RS Jr | Merrillville HS; Triton College; Western Illinois | Merrillville, IN |

Head coach

- Todd Phillips (Lewis–Clark State)

Assistant coach(es)

- Todd Okeson (Nevada)
- Andrew May (BYU)
- Ivory "Trey" Young (Utah Valley)
- Trevor Stranger (Boise State)

Strength and conditioning coach(es)

- Kaleb John-Lewis

Athletic trainer(s)

- Troyce Solley

Legend

- (C) Team captain
- (S) Suspended
- (I) Ineligible
- (W) Walk-on
- Injured
- Current redshirt

Roster
Last update: July 27, 2026

== Schedule and results ==
| Date time, TV | Rank^{#} | Opponent^{#} | Result | Record | High points | High rebounds | High assists | Site (attendance) city, state |
Exhibition
| October 17, 2026*; 7:00pm, TBA | | Utah Tech; Old Hammer Rivalry | L 80–92 | – | 15 – Nelson | 8 – I. Davis | 3 – Tied | Burns Arena (472); St. George, UT |
Regular season
| November 2, 2026*; 6:00 p.m., ESPN+ | | Western Colorado | W 84–63 | 1–0 | 22 – I. Davis | 5 – Tied | 5 – Barnes | UCCU Center (1,607); Orem, UT |
| November 7, 2026*; 7:00 p.m., ESPN+ | | at Weber State | W 101–93 | 2–0 | 21 – Weaver | 6 – Hawkins | 7 – Barnes | Dee Events Center (3,375); Ogden, UT |
| November 14, 2026*; 8:00 p.m., MW+ | | at Nevada | W 73–71 | 3–0 | 26 – Hawkins | 6 – Tied | 4 – Housley | Lawlor Events Center (7,358); Reno, NV |
| November 20, 2026*; 7:00pm, ESPN+ | | vs. East Carolina; Paradise Jam Opening Round | W 90–79 | 4–0 | 18 – Tied | 8 – Nelson | 4 – Barnes | UVI Sports and Fitness Center (524); Charlotte Amalie West, U.S. Virgin Islands |
| November 22, 2026*; 6:00pm, ESPN+ | | vs. UT Martin; Paradise Jam | | | | | | UVI Sports and Fitness Center; Charlotte Amalie West, U.S. Virgin Islands |
| November 23, 2026*; TBA, ESPN+ | | vs. Temple/Stephen F. Austin; Paradise Jam | | | | | | UVI Sports and Fitness Center; Charlotte Amalie West, U.S. Virgin Islands |
| November 28, 2026*; 2:00pm, ESPN+ | | San Jose State | | | | | | UCCU Center; Orem, UT |
| December 3, 2026; 8:00 p.m., ESPN+ | | at Long Beach State | | | | | | LBS Financial Credit Union Pyramid; Long Beach, CA |
| December 5, 2026; 2:00pm, ESPN+ | | Sacramento State | | | | | | UCCU Center; Orem, UT |
| December 12, 2026*; 3:00pm, ESPN+ | | at Pacific | | | | | | Alex G. Spanos Center; Stockton, CA |
| December 16, 2026*; 7:00 p.m., Pac-12 YouTube | | at Boise State | | | | | | ExtraMile Arena; Boise, ID |
| December 21, 2026*; 6:00pm, ESPN+ | | Justice | | | | | | UCCU Center; Orem, UT |
| December 31, 2026; 2:00pm, ESPN+ | | Cal State Bakersfield | | | | | | UCCU Center; Orem, UT |
| January 2, 2027; 2:00pm, ESPN+ | | Cal State Northridge | | | | | | UCCU Center; Orem, UT |
| January 7, 2027; 8:00 p.m., ESPN+ | | at UC San Diego | | | | | | LionTree Arena; San Diego, CA |
| January 9, 2027; 8:00 p.m., ESPN+ | | at UC Irvine | | | | | | Bren Events Center; Irvine, CA |
| January 14, 2027; 6:00pm, ESPN+ | | UC Santa Barbara | | | | | | UCCU Center; Orem, UT |
| January 16, 2027; 2:00pm, ESPN+ | | Cal Poly | | | | | | UCCU Center; Orem, UT |
| January 21, 2027; 6:00pm, ESPN+ | | California Baptist | | | | | | UCCU Center; Orem, UT |
| January 23, 2027; 2:00pm, ESPN+ | | UC Riverside | | | | | | UCCU Center; Orem, UT |
| January 28, 2027; 8:00 p.m., ESPN+ | | at Cal State Northridge | | | | | | Premier America Credit Union Arena; Northridge, CA |
| January 30, 2027; 3:00 p.m., ESPN+ | | at Cal State Bakersfield | | | | | | Icardo Center; Bakersfield, CA |
| February 4, 2027; 8:00 p.m., ESPN+ | | at UC Riverside | | | | | | SRC Arena; Riverside, CA |
| February 6, 2027; 6:00 p.m., ESPN+ | | at California Baptist | | | | | | Fowler Events Center; Riverside, CA |
| February 11, 2027; 6:00pm, ESPN+ | | UC Irvine | | | | | | UCCU Center; Orem, UT |
| February 13, 2027; 2:00pm, ESPN+ | | UC San Diego | | | | | | UCCU Center; Orem, UT |
| February 18, 2027; 8:00 p.m., ESPN+ | | at Cal State Fullerton | | | | | | Titan Gym; Fullerton, CA |
| February 20, 2027; 8:00 p.m., ESPN+ | | at Sacramento State | | | | | | Hornets Nest; Sacramento, CA |
| February 25, 2027; 6:00pm, ESPN+ | | Long Beach State | | | | | | UCCU Center; Orem, UT |
| February 27, 2027; 2:00pm, ESPN+ | | Cal State Fullerton | | | | | | UCCU Center; Orem, UT |
| March 4, 2027; 8:00 p.m., ESPN+ | | at Cal Poly | | | | | | Mott Athletics Center; San Luis Obispo, CA |
| March 6, 2027; 7:00 p.m., ESPN+ | | at UC Santa Barbara | | | | | | The Thunderdome; Santa Barbara, CA |
Big West tournament
| March 11–13, 2027; TBA | | vs. TBD | | | | | | Lee's Family Forum; Henderson, NV |
*Non-conference game. ^{#}Rankings from AP poll. (#) Tournament seedings in parentheses. All times are in Mountain.

‡ Following their departures from the WAC, Utah Valley and Southern Utah signed a four-year scheduling agreement to preserve their in-state rivalry. The series was scheduled to begin in the 2026–27 season in Cedar City and features a $25,000 per-game cancellation penalty. However, due to undisclosed reasons, the series was postponed until a future year.

== See also ==
- 2026–27 Utah Valley Wolverines women's basketball team
