= 2026 Players Era Festival =

College basketball tournament

2026 Men's Players Era Festival
- Season: 2026–27
- Teams: 16 & 8
- Finals site: T-Mobile Arena; Michelob Ultra Arena, (Las Vegas, Nevada)
- Champions: Houston (Players Era 8) (1st title)
- Runner-up: Kansas (Players Era 8) (1st title game)
- Semifinalists: Florida (Players Era 8) (1st semifinal); West Virginia (Players Era 8) (1st semifinal)
- Winning coach: Kelvin Sampson (Players Era 8) (1st title)

The 2026 Players Era Festival is an ongoing early-season college basketball tournament. It is the third edition of the Players Era Festival and the first with ESPN as the broadcaster. The tournament expanded to 24 teams, featuring an eight-team tournament that was played on November 17–19 named the Players Era 8 and a separate 16-team tournament on Thanksgiving weekend from November 24–28 dubbed the Players Era 16, with each championship going back to a bracketed elimination event.

== Teams ==
=== Players Era 8 ===
Team	Most Recent Appearance	Best Finish
Auburn	2025	Consolation Game (2025)
Florida	first appearance	–
Houston	2025	4th (2024)
Kansas	2025	3rd (2025)
Notre Dame	2025	Consolation Game (2025)
Rutgers	2025	Consolation Game (2025)
UNLV	2025	Consolation Game (2025)
West Virginia	first appearance	–

=== Players Era 16 ===
Team	Most Recent Appearance	Best Finish
Alabama	2025	2nd (2024)
Baylor	2025	Consolation Game (2025)
Creighton	2025	Consolation Game (2025)
Gonzaga	2025	2nd (2025)
Iowa State	2025	Consolation Game (2025)
Kansas State	first appearance	–
Louisville	first appearance	–
Maryland	2025	Consolation Game (2025)
Miami	first appearance	–
Michigan	2025	Champion (2025)
Oregon	2025	Champion (2024)
San Diego State	2025	3rd (2024)
St. John's	2025	Consolation Game (2025)
Tennessee	2025	4th (2025)
TCU	first appearance	–
Texas Tech	first appearance	–

== Bracket ==
=== Players Era 8 ===
5th Place Game; Thursday, November 19
Notre Dame	78
Auburn	73
7th Place Game
Rutgers	89
UNLV	70

Consolation 2nd Round; Wednesday, November 18
Rutgers	100
Notre Dame	110*
UNLV	71
Auburn	86

First Round; Tuesday, November 17
8	Houston	85
Rutgers	73
Notre Dame	78
1	Florida	86
UNLV	77
11	Kansas	102
West Virginia	76
Auburn	70

Semifinals; Wednesday, November 18
8	Houston	86
1	Florida	76
11	Kansas	86
West Virginia	82

Championship; Thursday, November 19
8	Houston	92
11	Kansas	83
3rd Place Game
1	Florida	85
West Virginia	72

Note: Game Times are listed in Pacific Time
* Denotes overtime

=== Players Era 16 ===
The 16-team bracket is structured as two 8-team brackets along with consolation rounds to determine first through eighth place finishes for each. The champion of each bracket will play a final Player Era 16 championship game to determine the overall champion.

==== Bracket 1 ====
All games to be played at Michelob Ultra Arena, Las Vegas, Nevada.

5th Place Game; Friday, November 27
8:30 p.m.
ESPN2
7th Place Game
12:30 p.m.
ESPNU

Consolations; Thursday, November 26
10:00 a.m.
ESPN
8:30 p.m.
ESPN2

First Round; Tuesday, November 24
Tennessee	12:00 p.m.
Maryland	ESPN
San Diego State	2:30 p.m.
Iowa State	ESPNU
Texas Tech	5:00 p.m.
Louisville	ESPN
Oregon	7:30 p.m.
St. John's	ESPN

Semifinals; Thursday, November 26
12:30 p.m.
ESPN
6:00 p.m.
ESPN2

Championship; Friday, November 27
6:00 p.m.
ESPN
3rd Place Game
10:00 a.m.
ESPN2

Note: Game Times are listed in Pacific Time
* Denotes overtime

==== Bracket 2 ====
All games to be played at T-Mobile Arena, Las Vegas, Nevada.

5th Place Game; Friday, November 27
5:30 p.m.
ESPNU
7th Place Game
2:30 p.m.
ESPNU

Consolations; Thursday, November 26
12:30 p.m.
ESPN2
6:00 p.m.
ESPNU

First Round; Tuesday, November 24
Miami	12:00 p.m.
TCU	ESPNU
Creighton	2:30 p.m.
Michigan	ESPN
Baylor	7:00 p.m.
Alabama	ESPN2
Gonzaga	9:30 p.m.
Kansas State	ESPN

Semifinals; Thursday, November 26
3:00 p.m.
ESPN
8:30 p.m.
ESPN

Championship; Friday, November 27
8:00 p.m.
ESPN
3rd Place Game
12:00 p.m.
ESPN2

Note: Game Times are listed in Pacific Time
* Denotes overtime

==== Grand Championship ====
Michelob Ultra Arena, Las Vegas, Nevada.

Players Era 16 championship Saturday, November 28
