= 2023–24 Utah Valley Wolverines men's basketball team =

Intercollegiate basketball season

2023–24 Utah Valley Wolverines men's basketball
- Conference: Western Athletic Conference
- Record: 16–16 (11–9 WAC)
- Head coach: Todd Phillips (1st season)
- Associate head coach: Todd Okeson (5th season)
- Assistant coaches: Louis Wilson (1st season); Rosbie Mutcherson (1st season)
- Home arena: UCCU Center (Capacity: 8,500)

2023–24 WAC men's basketball standings
	Conf.				Overall
Team	W		L	PCT	W		L	PCT
Grand Canyon †	17	–	3	.850	30	–	5	.857
Tarleton *	16	–	4	.800	25	–	10	.714
UT Arlington	13	–	7	.650	20	–	14	.588
Seattle	11	–	9	.550	23	–	14	.622
Utah Valley	11	–	9	.550	16	–	16	.500
Stephen F. Austin	10	–	10	.500	18	–	15	.545
Abilene Christian	10	–	10	.500	16	–	18	.471
California Baptist	8	–	12	.400	16	–	17	.485
Utah Tech *	7	–	13	.350	11	–	20	.355
Southern Utah	5	–	15	.250	10	–	21	.323
UT Rio Grande Valley	2	–	18	.100	6	–	25	.194
† 2024 WAC tournament winner * Ineligible for the NCAA tournament due to transition from Division II

The 2023–24 Utah Valley Wolverines men's basketball team represented Utah Valley University (UVU) in the 2023–24 NCAA Division I men's basketball season. The Wolverines, led by first-year head coach Todd Phillips, played their home games at the UCCU Center in Orem, Utah, and competed as members of the Western Athletic Conference (WAC). They finished the season 16–16, 11–9 in WAC play, to finish in a tie for fourth place. As the No. 5 seed in the WAC tournament, they lost to California Baptist in the first round.

== Previous season ==
The Wolverines finished the 2022–23 season 28–9, 15–3 in WAC play, to finish in first place. As the No. 2 seed in the 2023 WAC tournament, they defeated No. 7 seed Tarleton State 72–58 in the quarterfinals. In the semifinals, UVU lost to No. 3 seed Southern Utah 88–89. In the National Invitational Tournament, UVU defeated New Mexico, Colorado and Cincinnati, before falling in overtime to the UAB 88–86 in the semifinals.

== Offseason ==
=== Departures ===
Name	Position	Height	Year	Reason for departure
Justin Harmon	G	6' 4"	Senior	Transferred to Illinois
Le'Tre Darthard	G	6' 4"	Junior	Transferred to Oklahoma
Tim Ceaser	F	6' 9"	Junior	Transferred to UNC Greensboro
Blaze Nield	G	6' 1"	Senior	Graduated
Trey Woodbury	G	6' 4"	Senior	Graduated
Tim Fuller	F/C	6' 9"	Senior	Graduated
Cam Alford	G	6' 1"	Junior	Transferred to Purdue Northwest
Tahj Small	C	6' 5"	Senior	Graduated
Jordan Battle	G	6' 2"	Sophomore	Transferred to Salt Lake CC
Aziz Bandaogo	C	7' 0"	Sophomore	Transferred to Cincinnati
Joao Das Chagas	F	6' 10"	Freshman	Transferred to Arizona Western

=== Incoming transfers ===
Name	Position	Height	Year	Previous school
Tanner Toolson	G	6' 5"	Sophomore	BYU
K'Mani Doughty	G	6' 5"	Junior	New Orleans
Caleb Stone-Carrawell	F	6' 7"	Senior	Austin Peay
Trevin Dorius	C	7' 1"	Senior	Utah State
Simon Akena	G	6' 6"	Junior	McCook CC
Drake Allen	G	6' 4"	Junior	Southern Utah
Nate Tshimanga	F	6' 10"	Junior	Troy

=== 2023 recruiting class ===
College recruiting information
Name	Hometown	School	Height	Weight	Commit date
Osiris Grady; Guard	Mount Pleasant, UT	Wasatch Academy	6 ft 8 in (2.03 m)	215 lb (98 kg)	May 30, 2023
Osiris Grady; Guard	Recruit ratings: Rivals: 247Sports: ESPN: (81)				
Jaxson Roberts; Guard	Draper, UT	Corner Canyon High School	6 ft 2 in (1.88 m)	190 lb (86 kg)	May 11, 2023
Jaxson Roberts; Guard	Recruit ratings: Scout: Rivals: 247Sports: ESPN: (N/A)				
Overall recruit ranking:
Note: In many cases, Scout, Rivals, 247Sports, On3, and ESPN may conflict in their listings of height and weight.; In these cases, the average was taken. ESPN grades are on a 100-point scale.; Sources:

== Roster ==
2023–24 Utah Valley Wolverines men's basketball team
Players
Coaches

Pos.	#	Name	Height	Weight	Year	Previous school	Hometown
G	0	Jackson Holcombe	6 ft 6 in (1.98 m)	200 lb (91 kg)	Fr	Timpanogos HS	Orem, UT
G	2	K'Mani Doughty	6 ft 5 in (1.96 m)	195 lb (88 kg)	Jr	Florida Prep; New Orleans	Brooklyn, NY
G	3	Drake Allen	6 ft 4 in (1.93 m)	190 lb (86 kg)	Sr	Westlake HS; Southern Utah	Eagle Mountain, UT
G	5	Tanner Toolson	6 ft 5 in (1.96 m)	195 lb (88 kg)	RS So	Union HS; BYU	Vancouver, WA
G	10	Simon Akena (redshirt)	6 ft 1 in (1.85 m)	205 lb (93 kg)	Jr	Tibble Gymnasium; McCook CC	Stockholm, Sweden
F	12	Osiris Grady	6 ft 8 in (2.03 m)	215 lb (98 kg)	Fr	Wasatch Academy	Las Vegas, NV
G	13	Jaden McClanahan	5 ft 10 in (1.78 m)	175 lb (79 kg)	Sr	Salesian HS; Independence CC	Vallejo, CA
G	14	Peter Amakasu	6 ft 4 in (1.93 m)	195 lb (88 kg)	Fr	Lehi HS	San Diego, CA
G	15	Cache Fields	6 ft 6 in (1.98 m)	210 lb (95 kg)	Sr	Pinewood HS; Gavilan College	Palo Alto, CA
G	20	Trevan Leonhardt	6 ft 4 in (1.93 m)	175 lb (79 kg)	RS Fr	Davis HS	Kaysville, UT
F	21	Nate Tshimanga	6 ft 10 in (2.08 m)	235 lb (107 kg)	Jr	North Central Texas Academy	Montreal, QC
G	24	McCaden Adams	6 ft 3 in (1.91 m)	185 lb (84 kg)	Fr	Pleasant Grove HS	Pleasant Grove, UT
F	25	Caleb Stone-Carrawell	6 ft 7 in (2.01 m)	210 lb (95 kg)	RS Sr	Cox Mill HS; Austin Peay	Concord, NC
C	32	Trevin Dorius	7 ft 1 in (2.16 m)	240 lb (109 kg)	Sr	Wasatch HS; Utah State	Heber City, UT
F	35	Ethan Potter	6 ft 8 in (2.03 m)	205 lb (93 kg)	So	Layton HS	Layton, UT

Head coach

- Todd Phillips (Lewis–Clark State)

Assistant coach(es)

- Todd Okeson (Nevada)
- Louis Wilson (William Jewell)
- Rosbie Mutcherson (Covenant)

Legend

- (C) Team captain
- (S) Suspended
- (I) Ineligible
- (W) Walk-on
- Injured
- Current redshirt

Roster
Last update: October 4, 2024

== Schedule and results ==
Date time, TV	Rank^{#}	Opponent^{#}	Result	Record	Site (attendance) city, state
Regular season
November 6, 2023*; 5:00 p.m., ESPN+		Carroll (MT)	W 81–73	1–0	UCCU Center (1,849); Orem, UT
November 9, 2023*; 5:30 p.m.		at Sam Houston; C-USA/WAC	W 79–73 ^{OT}	2–0	Bernard Johnson Coliseum (1,187); Huntsville, TX
November 15, 2023*; 5:00 p.m., ESPN+		at Charlotte; Jacksonville Classic campus-site game	L 45–62	2–1	Halton Arena (2,784); Charlotte, NC
November 19, 2023*; 10:00 a.m., PassThaBall Live		vs. Southern Miss; Jacksonville Classic Bay semifinals	W 67–65	3–1	Flagler Gymnasium (311); St. Augustine, FL
November 20, 2023*; 12:00 p.m., PassThaBall Live		vs. Cornell; Jacksonville Classic Bay championship	L 61–74	3–2	Flagler Gymnasium (348); St. Augustine, FL
November 24, 2023*; 6:00 p.m., ESPN+		Western Colorado	W 81–73	4–2	UCCU Center (1,326); Orem, UT
November 29, 2023; 6:00 p.m., ESPN+		Seattle	W 78–72	5–2 (1–0)	UCCU Center (2,319); Orem, UT
December 2, 2023; 7:00 p.m., ESPN+		at Utah Tech; Old Hammer Rivalry	L 53–65	5–3 (1–1)	Burns Arena (2,501); St. George, UT
December 5, 2023*; 6:00 p.m., ESPN+		Weber State	W 70–54	6–3	UCCU Center (1,651); Orem, UT
December 9, 2023*; 3:00 p.m., P12N		at Oregon State	L 71–74	6–4	Gill Coliseum (2,867); Corvallis, OR
December 16, 2023*; 2:00 p.m., P12N		at Utah	L 62–76	6–5	Jon M. Huntsman Center (8,349); Salt Lake City, UT
December 20, 2023*; 6:00 p.m., ESPN+		Liberty; C-USA/WAC	L 63–79	6–6	UCCU Center (1,407); Orem, UT
December 29, 2023*; 7:00 p.m., MW Network		at Boise State	L 63–85	6–7	ExtraMile Arena (10,764); Boise, ID
January 4, 2024; 6:00 p.m., ESPN+		Cal Baptist	W 65–58	7–7 (2–1)	UCCU Center (1,553); Orem, UT
January 6, 2024; 2:00 p.m., ESPN+		Southern Utah	W 80–62	8–7 (3–1)	UCCU Center (2,163); Orem, UT
January 11, 2024; 6:00 p.m., ESPN+		at UT Arlington	L 69–83	8–8 (3–2)	College Park Center (1,112); Arlington, TX
January 13, 2024; 5:30 p.m., ESPN+		at UT Rio Grande Valley	L 68–76	8–9 (3–3)	UTRGV Fieldhouse (1,015); Edinburg, TX
January 18, 2024; 7:00 p.m., ESPN+		at Grand Canyon	L 65–78	8–10 (3–4)	GCU Arena (7,239); Phoenix, AZ
January 20, 2024; 2:00 p.m., ESPN+		Utah Tech; Old Hammer Rivalry	W 84–71	9–10 (4–4)	UCCU Center (2,801); Orem, UT
January 26, 2024; 7:00 p.m., ESPNU		at Seattle	L 61–62	9–11 (4–5)	Redhawk Center (999); Seattle, WA
February 1, 2024; 5:30 p.m., ESPN+		at Stephen F. Austin	L 72–77	9–12 (4–6)	William R. Johnson Coliseum (2,208); Nacogdoches, TX
February 3, 2024; 2:00 p.m., ESPN+		Grand Canyon	L 67–86	9–13 (4–7)	UCCU Center (2,381); Orem, UT
February 8, 2024; 6:00 p.m., ESPN+		Tarleton	L 61–72	9–14 (4–8)	UCCU Center (1,985); Orem, UT
February 10, 2024; 2:00 p.m., ESPN+		Abilene Christian	W 74–45	10–14 (5–8)	UCCU Center (2,474); Orem, UT
February 15, 2024; 8:00 p.m., ESPN+		at Cal Baptist	W 69–46	11–14 (6–8)	Fowler Events Center (2,230); Riverside, CA
February 17, 2024; 6:30 p.m., ESPN+		at Southern Utah	W 78–75	12–14 (7–8)	America First Event Center (1,613); Cedar City, UT
February 22, 2024; 6:00 p.m., ESPN+		UT Rio Grande Valley	W 70–59	13–14 (8–8)	UCCU Center (2,601); Orem, UT
February 24, 2024; 2:00 p.m., ESPN+		Stephen F. Austin	W 71–62	14–14 (9–8)	UCCU Center (2,357); Orem, UT
March 2, 2024; 2:00 p.m., ESPN+		UT Arlington	L 65–78	14–15 (9–9)	UCCU Center (2,651); Orem, UT
March 7, 2024; 6:00 p.m., ESPN+		at Tarleton	W 63–60	15–15 (10–9)	Wisdom Gym (N/A); Stephenville, TX
March 9, 2024; 2:00 p.m., ESPN+		at Abilene Christian	W 74–67	16–15 (11–9)	Moody Coliseum (1,817); Abilene, TX
WAC tournament
March 13, 2024; 7:00 p.m., ESPN+	(5)	vs. (8) California Baptist; First round	L 63–74 ^{OT}	16–16	Orleans Arena (1,064); Paradise, NV
*Non-conference game. ^{#}Rankings from AP poll. (#) Tournament seedings in parentheses. All times are in Mountain.

== See also ==
- 2023–24 Utah Valley Wolverines women's basketball team
