= Sam Little =

Sam Little may refer to:

- Sam Little (basketball) (born 1946), American basketball player
- Sam Little (golfer) (born 1975), English golfer
- Samuel Little (1940–2020) convicted American serial killer
