= Jake Toolson =

American basketball player (born 1996)

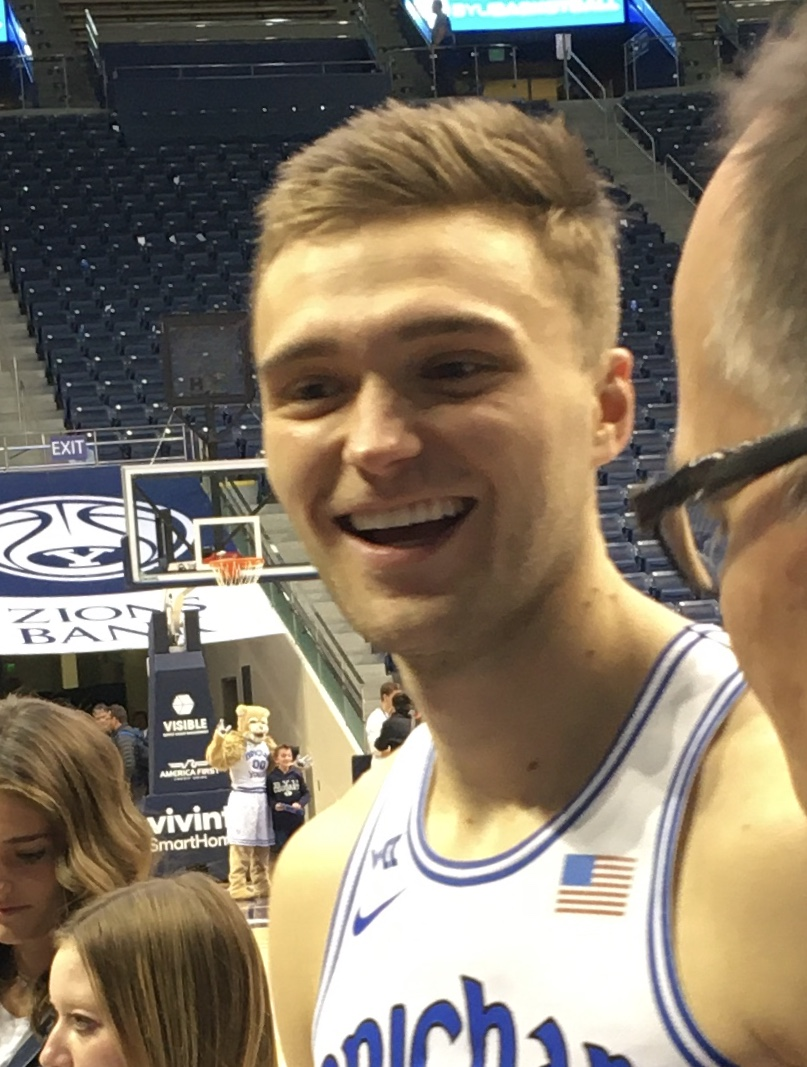

Personal information
- Born: March 6, 1996 (age 30)
- Listed height: 6 ft 5 in (1.96 m)
- Listed weight: 205 lb (93 kg)

Career information
- High school: Highland (Gilbert, Arizona)
- College: BYU (2014–2016); Utah Valley (2017–2019); BYU (2019–2020)
- NBA draft: 2020: undrafted
- Playing career: 2021–2022
- Position: Shooting guard

Career history
- 2021: Salt Lake City Stars
- 2021–2022: BG Göttingen

Career highlights
- AP Honorable Mention All-American (2019); WAC Player of the Year (2019); WCC Newcomer of the Year (2020); First-team All-WAC (2019); First-team All-WCC (2020)
- Stats at NBA.com
- Stats at Basketball Reference

Jake Toolson (born March 6, 1996) is an American former basketball player who last played for BG Göttingen of the easyCredit BBL. He played college basketball for the Utah Valley Wolverines and the BYU Cougars. He was named the 2019 Western Athletic Conference Player of the Year.

Toolson's father Troy is the cousin of former Jazz wing Andy Toolson.

== College career ==
Toolson, a shooting guard from Highland High School in Gilbert, Arizona, committed to play college basketball for Brigham Young University (BYU). In his sophomore season for the Cougars, Toolson appeared in 10 games and averaged 3.9 points per game before taking a medical leave and ending his season. Following his shortened sophomore season, Toolson decided to transfer to Utah Valley to play for former BYU assistant Mark Pope.

After sitting out the 2016–17 season as a transfer, Toolson found immediate playing time for the Wolverines. He started every game and averaged 10.9 points per game, shooting 45% from the floor in his redshirt sophomore season. As a senior, he averaged 15.8 points per game. At the close of the season, Toolson was named first-team All-Western Athletic Conference and the WAC Player of the Year. He was the first UVU player to receive this award.

On May 24, 2019, Toolson announced he would transfer back to BYU as a graduate transfer for his senior year, reuniting with his UVU coach who had been hired to coach the Cougars. Toolson scored a career-high 28 points and had six three-pointers on January 24, 2020, in a 74–60 win over Pacific. On February 22, 2020, Toolson scored 17 points in a 91–78 upset of second-ranked Gonzaga. At the conclusion of the regular season, Toolson was named to the First Team All-West Coast Conference as well as Newcomer of the Year. Toolson averaged 15.2 points and 4.8 rebounds per game while shooting 47% from the floor as a senior.

== Professional career ==
After going undrafted in the 2020 NBA draft, Toolson signed an Exhibit 10 deal with the Utah Jazz. He was waived at the conclusion of training camp and then assigned to the Jazz's NBA G League affiliate, the Salt Lake City Stars. On February 14, 2021, he suffered a season-ending injury and was subsequently waived after one game.

On June 4, 2021, Toolson signed with BG Göttingen of the German easyCredit BBL.

== Career statistics ==
Legend
GP	Games played	GS	Games started	MPG	Minutes per game
FG%	Field goal percentage	3P%	3-point field goal percentage	FT%	Free throw percentage
RPG	Rebounds per game	APG	Assists per game	SPG	Steals per game
BPG	Blocks per game	PPG	Points per game	**Bold**	Career high

=== College ===
Year	Team	GP	GS	MPG	FG%	3P%	FT%	RPG	APG	SPG	BPG	PPG
2014–15	BYU	26	0	7.8	.420	.400	**1.000**	1.4	.5	.3	.0	2.3
2015–16	BYU	10	5	13.8	.455	.368	**1.000**	1.6	1.2	.3	.0	3.9
2016–17	Utah Valley	Redshirt										
2017–18	Utah Valley	33	33	27.9	.496	.357	.846	4.7	2.9	.8	.2	10.9
2018–19	Utah Valley	**35**	**35**	33.3	**.537**	.448	.851	4.5	2.3	.5	.2	**15.7**
2019–20	BYU	32	32	**33.6**	.472	**.470**	.797	**4.8**	**3.9**	**1.1**	**.4**	15.2
Career		136	105	25.7	.497	.433	.838	3.8	2.4	.6	.2	11.0

== Personal life ==
Toolson is the nephew of former NBA player and Brigham Young All-American Danny Ainge. His father is the cousin of former NBA player Andy Toolson.
