= 2025 Players Era Festival =

College basketball tournament

2025 Men's Players Era Festival
- Season: 2025–26
- Teams: 18
- Finals site: MGM Grand Garden Arena, (Las Vegas, Nevada)
- Champions: Michigan (1st title)
- Runner-up: Gonzaga (1st title game)
- Semifinalists: Kansas (1st semifinal); Tennessee (1st semifinal)
- Winning coach: Dusty May (1st title)
- MVP: Yaxel Lendeborg (Michigan)

2025 Women's Players Era Festival
- Season: 2025–26
- Teams: 4
- Finals site: Michelob Ultra Arena, (Las Vegas, Nevada)
- Champions: Texas (1st title)
- Runner-up: South Carolina (1st title game)
- Winning coach: Vic Schaefer (1st title)
- MVP: Rori Harmon (Texas)

The 2025 Players Era Festival was an early-season college basketball tournament. It was the second edition of the Players Era Festival and the first to feature men's and women's teams. The tournament was played from November 24 to November 27, 2025. After the 2024 men's edition featured eight teams, in 2025 it was expanded to include 18 teams. The men's tournament was changed from an elimination tournament to a Swiss-system in 2025, with the teams with the best record and the largest margin of victory point differential advancing to the championship. A women's tournament was created in 2025, including four teams. Every participating team was guaranteed at least $1 million in NIL. An additional $12 million was given to teams based on performance. The Michigan Wolverines won the men's tournament, and the Texas Longhorns won the women's inaugural edition.

== Standings ==
=== Men's ===
Point differentials for each game are capped at a maximum of twenty points, even if a team wins by more than twenty. First tie break is average margin of victory, second tie break is total points scored and the third tiebreak is total points allowed.

Team	GP	W	L	PD (Note: Capped at 20 per game)	PF	PA	Qualification
Michigan	2	2	0	+40	196	126	Advanced to Championship Game
Gonzaga	2	2	0	+30	195	146	Advanced to Championship Game
Tennessee	2	2	0	+23	161	133	Advanced to 3rd Place Game
Kansas	2	2	0	+21	142	121	Advanced to 3rd Place Game
Iowa State	2	2	0	+19	161	142	Consolation Games
St. John's	2	1	1	+14	178	164	Consolation Games
Alabama	2	1	1	+10	200	162	Consolation Games
Houston	2	1	1	+1	151	150	Consolation Games
San Diego State	2	1	1	-3	151	174	Consolation Games
Notre Dame	2	1	1	-5	129	134	Consolation Games
Baylor	2	1	1	-8	162	170	Consolation Games
Auburn	2	1	1	-9	156	175	Consolation Games
Maryland	2	1	1	-13	135	167	Consolation Games
Syracuse	2	0	2	-15	134	149	Consolation Games
Creighton	2	0	2	-25	134	159	Consolation Games
Rutgers	2	0	2	-25	123	153	Consolation Games
UNLV	2	0	2	-27	143	189	Consolation Games
Oregon	2	0	2	-28	153	181	Consolation Games

== Bracket ==
=== Men's ===
==== Group Stage ====
Date	Time	Winning Team	Losing Team	Score	Location	Television	Attendance
November 24, 2025	10:00 AM	No. 17 Tennessee	Rutgers	85–60	MGM Grand Garden Arena	TNT	
November 24, 2025	12:30 PM	Kansas	Notre Dame	71–61	MGM Grand Garden Arena	TNT	
November 24, 2025	3:00 PM	No. 3 Houston	Syracuse	78–74^{OT}	MGM Grand Garden Arena	TNT	
November 24, 2025	6:30 PM	No. 12 Gonzaga	No. 8 Alabama	95–85	MGM Grand Garden Arena	TNT	
November 24, 2025	9:00 PM	Maryland	UNLV	74–67	MGM Grand Garden Arena	TNT	
November 24, 2025	11:00 AM	Baylor	Creighton	81–74	Michelob Ultra Arena	TruTV	
November 24, 2025	1:30 PM	No. 15 Iowa State	No. 14 St. John's	83–82	Michelob Ultra Arena	TruTV	
November 24, 2025	5:00 PM	No. 21 Auburn	Oregon	84–73	Michelob Ultra Arena	TruTV	
November 24, 2025	7:30 PM	No. 7 Michigan	San Diego State	94–54	Michelob Ultra Arena	TruTV	
November 25, 2025	10:00 AM	Notre Dame	Rutgers	68–63	MGM Grand Garden Arena	TNT	
November 25, 2025	12:30 PM	Kansas	Syracuse	71–60	MGM Grand Garden Arena	TNT	
November 25, 2025	3:00 PM	No. 17 Tennessee	No. 3 Houston	76–73	MGM Grand Garden Arena	TNT	
November 25, 2025	6:30 PM	No. 12 Gonzaga	Maryland	100–61	MGM Grand Garden Arena	TruTV	
November 25, 2025	9:00 PM	No. 8 Alabama	UNLV	115–76	MGM Grand Garden Arena	TruTV	
November 25, 2025	11:30 AM	No. 15 Iowa State	Creighton	78–60	Michelob Ultra Arena	TruTV	
November 25, 2025	2:00 PM	No. 14 St. John's	Baylor	96–81	Michelob Ultra Arena	TruTV	
November 25, 2025	5:30 PM	No. 7 Michigan	No. 21 Auburn	102–72	Michelob Ultra Arena	TNT	
November 25, 2025	8:00 PM	San Diego State	Oregon	97–80	Michelob Ultra Arena	TNT	

Times are PST. Winning teams in bold. Source:

==== Consolation Games ====
**Consolation Game**; November 26; TNT
	Syracuse	64
**15**	**Iowa State**	**95**

**Consolation Game**; November 26; TNT
	Notre Dame	56
**3**	**Houston**	**66**

**Consolation Game**; November 26 truTV
14	St. John’s	74
**21**	**Auburn**	**85**

**Consolation Game**; November 26 truTV
**Baylor**	**91**
San Diego State	81

**Consolation Game**; November 26; TNT
**8**	**Alabama**	**105**
	Maryland	72

**Consolation Game**; November 27 truTV
Oregon	66
**Creighton**	**76**

**Consolation Game**; November 27 truTV
UNLV	65
**Rutgers**	**80**

==== Championship Day ====
**3rd Place Game**; November 26; TNT
	**Kansas**	**81**
17	Tennessee	76

**Championship Game**; November 26; TNT
**7**	**Michigan**	**101**
12	Gonzaga	61

=== Women's ===
Semifinals; November 26; TruTV
**4**	**Texas**	**76**
3	UCLA	65
Duke	66
**2**	**South Carolina**	**83**

Championship; November 27; TruTV
**4**	**Texas**	**66**
2	South Carolina	64
Consolation; November 27; TruTV
**3**	**UCLA**	**89**
Duke	59

Times are PST. Source:

== Broadcasting ==
TNT Sports holds the exclusive rights to broadcast the 2025 Players Era Festival. Unlike last season, games will air only on TNT or TruTV. All games will additionally stream on HBO Max.

The commentary teams for the tournament are as follows

1. Brian Anderson, Grant Hill, and Lauren Jbara (lead)
2. Brandon Gaudin, Candace Parker or Robbie Hummel, and Nabil Karim
3. Spero Dedes, Greg Anthony, and Jared Greenberg
4. JB Long, Candace Parker, and Autumn Johnson or Chelsea Sherrod
