= 2025–26 Kansas Jayhawks men's basketball team =

American college basketball season

2025–26 Kansas Jayhawks men's basketball

NCAA tournament, Second round
- Conference: Big 12 Conference

Ranking
- Coaches: No. 20
- AP: No. 20
- Record: 24–11 (12–6 Big 12)
- Head coach: Bill Self (23rd season)
- Assistant coaches: Jeremy Case (5th season); Kurtis Townsend (22nd season); Joe Dooley (12th season); Jacque Vaughn (1st season); Tony Bland (1st season)
- Home arena: Allen Fieldhouse

2025–26 Big 12 men's basketball standings
	Conf.				Overall
Team	W		L	PCT	W		L	PCT
No. 3 Arizona †	16	–	2	.889	36	–	3	.923
No. 7 Houston	14	–	4	.778	30	–	7	.811
No. 20 Kansas	12	–	6	.667	24	–	11	.686
No. 21 Texas Tech	12	–	6	.667	23	–	11	.676
No. 8 Iowa State	12	–	6	.667	29	–	8	.784
TCU	11	–	7	.611	23	–	12	.657
West Virginia	9	–	9	.500	21	–	14	.600
UCF	9	–	9	.500	21	–	12	.636
Cincinnati	9	–	9	.500	18	–	15	.545
BYU	9	–	9	.500	23	–	12	.657
Colorado	7	–	11	.389	17	–	16	.515
Arizona State	7	–	11	.389	17	–	16	.515
Baylor	6	–	12	.333	17	–	17	.500
Oklahoma State	6	–	12	.333	20	–	15	.571
Kansas State	3	–	15	.167	12	–	20	.375
Utah	2	–	16	.111	10	–	22	.313
† 2026 Big 12 tournament winner Rankings from AP poll

The 2025–26 Kansas Jayhawks men's basketball team represented the University of Kansas in the 2025–26 NCAA Division I men's basketball season, the Jayhawks' 128th basketball season. The Jayhawks, members of the Big 12 Conference, played their home games at Allen Fieldhouse in Lawrence, Kansas. They were led by 23rd year Hall of Fame head coach Bill Self. Jacque Vaughn served as acting head coach for Kansas' January 20, 2026 game against the Colorado Buffaloes as Self recovered from a health-related incident.

== Offseason ==
=== Coaching staff changes ===
Norm Roberts announced his retirement on May 5, 2025, after 14 seasons with Kansas. Former Kansas guard and NBA player Jacque Vaughn was announced as the replacement. He previously served as head coach in the NBA with the Orlando Magic and Brooklyn Nets.

On August 16, 2025, it was announced that Chase Buford had accepted an assistant coaching post with the NBA’s Denver Nuggets. On August 20, 2025, it was announced that Tony Bland had been hired to fill the vacancy.

=== Graduating players ===
Players listed below were seniors from the previous season who either have run out of eligibility or seniors with an extra year of eligibility due to the COVID-19 pandemic who have not announced a return to the team. Players with an asterisk next to their name still have remaining eligibility and could decide to return to the program but have not declared for their remaining year.

Name	Position
Dajuan Harris Jr.	G
K. J. Adams Jr.	F
Hunter Dickinson	G
Zeke Mayo*	G
Patrick Cassidy	G
David Coit*	G
Shakeel Moore	G

=== Returning fifth-year seniors ===
Players below were seniors returning for a fifth year.

Name	Position
Justin Cross	G

=== Transfers ===
==== Incoming ====
Name	Position	Class	Old school
Tre White	SG	Senior	Illinois
Jayden Dawson	G	Senior	Loyola
Melvin Council Jr.	SG	Senior	St. Bonaventure

==== Outgoing ====
Name	Position	Class	New school
AJ Storr	SF	Senior	Ole Miss
Rylan Griffen	SF	Senior	Texas A&M
Zach Clemence	G	RS−Junior	Texas A&M
Rakease Passmore	SG	Sophomore	Maryland
David Coit Jr.	PG	RS−Senior	Maryland

=== 2025 recruiting class ===
College recruiting
Name	Hometown	School	Height	Weight	Commit date
Darryn Peterson; G	Fort Lauderdale, FL	Prolific Prep	6 ft 5 in (1.96 m)	195 lb (88 kg)	Nov 1, 2024
Darryn Peterson; G	Recruit ratings: Rivals: 247Sports: ESPN: (98)				
Kohl Rosario; G	Hickory, NC	Moravian Prep	6 ft 4 in (1.93 m)	185 lb (84 kg)	Jun 24, 2025
Kohl Rosario; G	Recruit ratings: Rivals: 247Sports: ESPN: (83)				
Samis Calderon; G	Espirito Santo, Brazil	Overtime Elite	6 ft 8 in (2.03 m)	200 lb (91 kg)	Nov 13, 2024
Samis Calderon; G	Recruit ratings: Rivals: 247Sports: ESPN: (82)				
Corbin Allen; SG	Kansas City, MO	Oak Park	6 ft 4 in (1.93 m)	180 lb (82 kg)	May 16, 2025
Corbin Allen; SG	Recruit ratings: Rivals: 247Sports: ESPN: (NA)				
Paul Mbiya; C	Paris, France	ASVEL Basket	6 ft 11 in (2.11 m)	240 lb (110 kg)	Jun 25, 2025
Paul Mbiya; C	Recruit ratings: Rivals: 247Sports: ESPN: (NA)				
Nginyu Ngala; PG	Alliance Montreal	Montreal, Canada	5 ft 10 in (1.78 m)	175 lb (79 kg)	Jul 25, 2025
Nginyu Ngala; PG	Recruit ratings: ESPN: (NA)				
Overall recruiting rankings: 247 Sports: 9 Rivals: 9 ESPN: 18

== Preseason ==
The Big 12 preseason coaches poll was released on October 16, 2025. All awards were voted on by the league's 16 head coaches, who could not vote for their own team or players. The Big 12 preseason media poll was released on October 30, 2025.

Big 12 Preseason Coaches Poll

	Big 12 Coaches	Points
1.	Houston	224 (12)
2.	BYU	204 (1)
3.	Texas Tech	200
4.	Arizona	179 (1)
5.	Iowa State	170
6.	Kansas	163
7.	Baylor	137
8.	Cincinnati	120
9.	Kansas State	117
10.	TCU	90
11.	West Virginia	79
12.	Oklahoma State	77
13.	Utah	50
14.	UCF	39
15.	Colorado	37
16.	Arizona State	34
Reference: (#) first-place votes

Big 12 Preseason Media Poll

	Big 12 Media
1.	Houston
2.	Texas Tech
3.	BYU
4.	Arizona
5.	Iowa State
6.	Kansas
7.	Baylor
8.	Kansas State
9.	Cincinnati
10.	TCU
11.	West Virginia
12.	Oklahoma State
13.	Utah
14.	UCF
15.	Colorado
16.	Arizona State

All-Big 12 Preseason First team

Player	School	Pos.	Yr.	Ht., wt.	Hometown (last school)
AJ Dybantsa†	BYU	F	Fr.	6'9", 195	Brockton, MA (Utah Prep)
Richie Saunders	BYU	G	Sr.	6'5", 200	Riverton, UT (Wasatch Academy)
Emanuel Sharp	Houston	G	R-Sr.	6'3", 205	Tampa, FL (Bishop McLaughlin School)
Joseph Tugler	Houston	F	Jr.	6'8", 230	Monroe, LA (Cypress Falls)
Milos Uzan	Houston	G	Sr.	6'4", 195	Las Vegas, NV (Oklahoma)
Tamin Lipsey	Iowa State	G	Sr.	6'1", 200	Ames, IA (Ames)
Darryn Peterson†	Kansas	G	Fr.	6'5", 205	Canton, OH (Napa Christian)
P.J. Haggerty	Kansas State	G	Jr.	6'4", 195	Crosby, TX (Memphis)
Christian Anderson Jr.	Texas Tech	G	So.	6'9", 195	Atlanta, GA (Oak Hill Academy)
JT Toppin†	Texas Tech	F	Jr.	6'9", 230	Dallas, TX (New Mexico)
† denotes unanimous selection Reference:

- Player of the Year: JT Toppin, Texas Tech
- Co-Newcomer of the Year: LeJuan Watts, Texas Tech
- Freshman of the Year: Darryn Peterson, Kansas

== Roster ==
2025–26 Kansas Jayhawks men's basketball team
Players
Coaches

Pos.	#	Name	Height	Weight	Year	Previous school	Hometown
G	0	Nginyu Ngala	5 ft 10 in (1.78 m)	175 lb (79 kg)	GS	Laurentian	Montreal, QC
G	1	Jayden Dawson	6 ft 5 in (1.96 m)	205 lb (93 kg)	Sr	Loyola	Omaha, NE
G	2	Corbin Allen	6 ft 5 in (1.96 m)	175 lb (79 kg)	Fr	Oak Park	Kansas City, MO
G	3	Tre White	6 ft 7 in (2.01 m)	215 lb (98 kg)	Sr	Illinois	Dallas, TX
F	6	Samis Calderon	6 ft 8 in (2.03 m)	200 lb (91 kg)	Fr	Overtime Elite	Espírito Santo, Brazil
G	7	Kohl Rosario	6 ft 6 in (1.98 m)	200 lb (91 kg)	Fr	Overtime Elite	Miami, FL
G	11	Jamari McDowell	6 ft 5 in (1.96 m)	200 lb (91 kg)	RS So	Manvel	Houston, TX
G	12	Wilder Evers (W)	6 ft 4 in (1.93 m)	195 lb (88 kg)	RS Jr	Oak Mountain	Birmingham, AL
G	13	Elmarko Jackson	6 ft 3 in (1.91 m)	195 lb (88 kg)	RS So	South Kent	Marlton, NJ
G	14	Melvin Council Jr.	6 ft 4 in (1.93 m)	180 lb (82 kg)	Sr	St. Bonaventure	Rochester, NY
F	15	Bryson Tiller	6 ft 11 in (2.11 m)	240 lb (109 kg)	Fr	Overtime Elite	Atlanta, GA
G	21	Will Thengvall (W)	6 ft 4 in (1.93 m)	190 lb (86 kg)	So	Kapaun Mt. Carmel Catholic	Wichita, KS
G	22	Darryn Peterson	6 ft 6 in (1.98 m)	205 lb (93 kg)	Fr	Prolific Prep	Canton, OH
F	25	Justin Cross	6 ft 8 in (2.03 m)	200 lb (91 kg)	RS Sr	Oak Park and River Forest	Oak Park, IL
C	34	Paul Mbiya	7 ft 0 in (2.13 m)	245 lb (111 kg)	Fr	ASVEL	Kinshasa, Democratic Republic of the Congo
F	40	Flory Bidunga	6 ft 10 in (2.08 m)	235 lb (107 kg)	So	Kokomo	Kinshasa, Democratic Republic of the Congo

Head coach

- Bill Self (Oklahoma State)

Assistant coach(es)

- Jacque Vaughn (Kansas)
- Kurtis Townsend (Western Kentucky)
- Jeremy Case (Kansas)
- Joe Dooley (George Washington)
- Tony Bland (San Diego State)

Legend

- (C) Team captain
- (S) Suspended
- (I) Ineligible
- (W) Walk-on
- Injured
- Current redshirt

Roster
Last update: November 3, 2025

== Schedule ==
Date time, TV	Rank^{#}	Opponent^{#}	Result	Record	High points	High rebounds	High assists	Site (attendance) city, state
Exhibition
October 24, 2025*; 6:30 p.m., ACCN	No. 19	at No. 11 Louisville	W 90–82	–	26 – Peterson	7 – Tiller	4 – Council Jr.	KFC Yum! Center (15,885); Louisville, KY
October 28, 2025*; 7:00 p.m., ESPN+	No. 19	Fort Hays State	W 71–35	–	16 – Council Jr.	9 – Tied	6 – Council Jr.	Allen Fieldhouse (15,300); Lawrence, KS
Non-conference regular season
November 3, 2025*; 7:00 p.m., ESPN+	No. 19	Green Bay	W 94–51	1–0	21 – Peterson	6 – Bidunga	4 – Council	Allen Fieldhouse (15,300); Lawrence, KS
November 7, 2025*; 6:00 p.m., ESPN	No. 19	at No. 25 North Carolina	L 74–87	1–1	22 – Peterson	7 – Bidunga	7 – Council	Dean Smith Center (21,750); Chapel Hill, NC
November 11, 2025*; 7:00 p.m., ESPN+	No. 25	Texas A&M–Corpus Christi	W 77–46	2–1	16 – Rosario	8 – Tied	6 – Council	Allen Fieldhouse (15,300); Lawrence, KS
November 15, 2025*; 1:00 p.m., ESPN+	No. 25	Princeton	W 76–57	3–1	25 – Bidunga	10 – Bidunga	6 – Council	Allen Fieldhouse (15,300); Lawrence, KS
November 18, 2025*; 8:00 p.m., ESPN	No. 24	vs. No. 5 Duke; State Farm Champions Classic	L 66–78	3–2	22 – White	9 – White	6 – Council	Madison Square Garden (19,327); New York, NY
November 24, 2025*; 2:30 p.m., TNT		vs. Notre Dame; Players Era Festival Game 1	W 71–61	4–2	18 – Bidunga	9 – Tiller	5 – Bidunga	MGM Grand Garden Arena (4,628); Paradise, NV
November 25, 2025*; 2:30 p.m., TNT		vs. Syracuse; Players Era Festival Game 2	W 71–60	5–2	15 – White	13 – Bidunga	5 – Council	MGM Grand Garden Arena; Paradise, NV
November 26, 2025*; 6:00 p.m., TNT		vs. No. 17 Tennessee; Players Era Festival 3rd Place Game	W 81–76	6–2	17 – Council	8 – Tiller	4 – Council	MGM Grand Garden Arena; Paradise, NV
December 2, 2025*; 8:00 p.m., ESPN2	No. 21	No. 5 UConn	L 55–61	6–3	12 – Council	12 – Bidunga	3 – Council	Allen Fieldhouse (15,300); Lawrence, KS
December 7, 2025*; 12:00 p.m., ESPN2	No. 21	vs. Missouri; Border War/StorageMart Border Showdown	W 80–60	7–3	20 – White	13 – White	8 – Council	T-Mobile Center (15,407); Kansas City, MO
December 13, 2025*; 4:30 p.m., ESPN	No. 19	at NC State	W 77–76 ^{OT}	8–3	36 – Council	11 – Bidunga	4 – Tied	Lenovo Center (19,119); Raleigh, NC
December 16, 2025*; 8:00 p.m., ESPN	No. 17	Towson	W 73–49	9–3	18 – Bidunga	10 – Bidunga	5 – White	Allen Fieldhouse (15,300); Lawrence, KS
December 22, 2025*; 7:00 p.m., ESPN+	No. 17	Davidson	W 90–61	10–3	18 – Bidunga	8 – Tied	9 – Council	Allen Fieldhouse (15,300); Lawrence, KS
Big 12 regular season
January 3, 2026; 1:00 p.m., Peacock/NBCSN	No. 17	at UCF	L 75–81	10–4 (0–1)	26 – Peterson	11 – White	2 – Tied	Addition Financial Arena (8,808); Orlando, FL
January 6, 2026; 8:00 p.m., ESPN	No. 22	TCU	W 104–100 ^{OT}	11–4 (1–1)	32 – Peterson	9 – Bidunga	8 – Council	Allen Fieldhouse (15,300); Lawrence, KS
January 10, 2026; 11:00 a.m., FOX	No. 22	at West Virginia	L 75–86	11–5 (1–2)	23 – Peterson	6 – Tied	4 – Council	WVU Coliseum (13,743); Morgantown, WV
January 13, 2026; 8:00 p.m., ESPN		No. 2 Iowa State	W 84–63	12–5 (2–2)	19 – White	10 – White	6 – McDowell	Allen Fieldhouse (15,300); Lawrence, KS
January 16, 2026; 7:00 p.m., FOX		Baylor	W 80–62	13–5 (3–2)	26 – Peterson	11 – Bidunga	5 – Council	Allen Fieldhouse (15,300); Lawrence, KS
January 20, 2026; 10:00 p.m., ESPN	No. 19	at Colorado	W 75–69	14–5 (4–2)	18 – Council	15 – White	4 – White	CU Events Center (8,356); Boulder, CO
January 24, 2026; 7:00 p.m., FOX	No. 19	at Kansas State; Sunflower Showdown	W 86–62	15–5 (5–2)	21 – Bidunga	10 – Bidunga	12 – Council	Bramlage Coliseum (9,111); Manhattan, KS
January 31, 2026; 3:30 p.m., ESPN	No. 14	No. 13 BYU; College GameDay	W 90–82	16–5 (6–2)	21 – Tiller	7 – Tiller	6 – Council	Allen Fieldhouse (15,300); Lawrence, KS
February 2, 2026; 8:00 p.m., ESPN	No. 11	at No. 13 Texas Tech	W 64–61	17–5 (7–2)	19 – Peterson	10 – Tiller	4 – Tiller	United Supermarkets Arena (14,953); Lubbock, TX
February 7, 2026; 1:30 p.m., FOX	No. 11	Utah	W 71–59	18–5 (8–2)	17 – Bidunga	10 – Bidunga	6 – Council	Allen Fieldhouse (15,300); Lawrence, KS
February 9, 2026; 8:00 p.m., ESPN	No. 9	No. 1 Arizona	W 82–78	19–5 (9–2)	23 – Tied	10 – Bidunga	6 – Council	Allen Fieldhouse (15,300); Lawrence, KS
February 14, 2026; 12:00 p.m., ABC	No. 9	at No. 5 Iowa State	L 56–74	19–6 (9–3)	15 – Council	13 – Bidunga	4 – Council	Hilton Coliseum (14,266); Ames, IA
February 18, 2026; 8:00 p.m., Peacock	No. 8	at Oklahoma State	W 81–69	20–6 (10–3)	23 – Peterson	11 – Tied	7 – Tied	Gallagher-Iba Arena (9,085); Stillwater, OK
February 21, 2026; 12:00 p.m., CBS	No. 8	Cincinnati	L 68–84	20–7 (10–4)	18 – Bidunga	12 – Bidunga	4 – Council	Allen Fieldhouse (15,300); Lawrence, KS
February 23, 2026; 8:00 p.m., ESPN	No. 14	No. 4 Houston	W 69–56	21–7 (11–4)	23 – White	10 – Tiller	4 – Council	Allen Fieldhouse (15,300); Lawrence, KS
February 28, 2026; 3:00 p.m., ESPN	No. 14	at No. 2 Arizona	L 61–84	21–8 (11–5)	24 – Peterson	5 – Peterson	4 – Council	McKale Center (14,688); Tucson, AZ
March 3, 2026; 8:00 p.m., FS1	No. 14	at Arizona State	L 60–70	21–9 (11–6)	16 – White	14 – White	4 – Peterson	Desert Financial Arena (10,452); Tempe, AZ
March 7, 2026; 1:00 p.m., CBS	No. 14	Kansas State; Sunflower Showdown	W 104–85	22–9 (12–6)	27 – Peterson	11 – White	10 – Council	Allen Fieldhouse (15,300); Lawrence, KS
Big 12 tournament
March 12, 2026; 8:30 p.m., ESPN2	(3) No. 14	vs. (6) TCU; Quarterfinal	W 78–73	23–9	24 – Peterson	10 – Bidunga	5 – Council	T-Mobile Center (17,015); Kansas City, MO
March 13, 2026; 8:30 p.m., ESPN	(3) No. 14	vs. (2) No. 5 Houston; Semifinal	L 47–69	23–10	14 – Peterson	12 – Bidunga	4 – Council	T-Mobile Center (19,450); Kansas City, MO
NCAA Tournament
March 20, 2026; 8:45 p.m., CBS	(4 E) No. 17	vs. (13 E) California Baptist; First round	W 68–60	24–10	28 – Peterson	10 – Tiller	4 – Council	Viejas Arena (11,441); San Diego, CA
March 22, 2026; 4:15 p.m., CBS	(4 E) No. 17	vs. (5 E) No. 10 St. John's; Second round	L 65–67	24–11	21 – Peterson	9 – Council	4 – Council	Viejas Arena (11,501); San Diego, CA
*Non-conference game. ^{#}Rankings from AP poll. (#) Tournament seedings in parentheses. E=East. All times are in Central Time.

== Rankings ==
Ranking movements Legend: ██ Increase in ranking ██ Decrease in ranking RV = Received votes
	Week																				
Poll	Pre	1	2	3	4	5	6	7	8	9	10	11	12	13	14	15	16	17	18	19	Final
AP	19	25	24	RV	21	19	17	17	17	22	RV	19	14	11	9	8	14	14	14	17	20
Coaches	19	24	23	RV	21	19	17	17	17	21	25	19	14	11	9	12	14	15	16	17	20
