= Melvin Council Jr. =

American basketball player (born 2002)

No. 14 – Kansas Jayhawks
- Position: Point guard / shooting guard
- League: Big 12

Personal information
- Born: April 23, 2002 (age 24) Rochester, New York
- Listed height: 6 ft 4 in (1.93 m)
- Listed weight: 180 lb (82 kg)

Career information
- High school: University Prep Charter School (Rochester, New York)
- College: Monroe (2021–2023); Wagner (2023–2024); St. Bonaventure (2024–2025); Kansas (2025–present)

Career highlights
- Big 12 Newcomer of the Year (2026); Third-team All-Atlantic 10 (2025); First-team All-NEC (2024)

Melvin Council Jr. (born April 23, 2002) is an American college basketball player for the Kansas Jayhawks. He has also played for the Monroe Mustangs, Wagner Seahawks and St. Bonaventure Bonnies.

== Early life ==
Council was born in Rochester, New York on April 23, 2002, the son of Chalonda Dillon and Melvin Council Sr. His father played professionally in Canada, Mexico and in the United States, including a long career with the Rochester RazorSharks and was selected by the Austin Toros in the NBA D League draft. Professionally, he averaged 10.8 points per game from 2009 until 2017. Council Jr. attended University Prep Charter School in Rochester, New York, and while in high school was falsely charged with first and third degree rape, which he was exonerated. This caused him to not play Division I basketball after high school and redshirt his first season during his junior college career.

== College career ==
Council first joined Monroe College in 2020 and did not play his first year. As a redshirt sophomore, he became Monroe's all-time leading scorer after averaging 18.7 points per game. As a result, he was named to the NJCAA Division I All-America Team for a second consecutive year. Following the season, Council transferred to Wagner College. Against Howard in the First Four of the NCAA tournament, he scored a team-high 21 points, leading the Seahawks to their first ever tournament victory. Council finished the season averaging 14.9 points, 5.4 rebounds, and 4.1 assists per game, before transferring for a second time to St. Bonaventure University. He made an instant impact in his first season with the Bonnies, emerging as the team's leading scorer. After finishing the season as the team's leader in scoring and assists, he was named to the third-team All-Atlantic 10. Following the conclusion of the season, Council entered the transfer portal for a third time and declared for the 2025 NBA draft.

Council withdrew from the draft and announced his decision to transfer to University of Kansas to play for the Kansas Jayhawks. He established himself as one of the Jayhawk's starting guards, with head coach Bill Self describing Council as the team's "MVP" following the first ten games of the season. In December 2025, he was named the Associated Press National Player of the Week after scoring a career-high 36 points against NC State. After leading the team in minutes played and total assists, Council was named the Big 12 Newcomer of the Year. In October 2026, Council received a temporary injunction and eligibility for the 2026–27 season, his seventh total season.

== Career statistics ==
Legend
GP	Games played	GS	Games started	MPG	Minutes per game
FG%	Field goal percentage	3P%	3-point field goal percentage	FT%	Free throw percentage
RPG	Rebounds per game	APG	Assists per game	SPG	Steals per game
BPG	Blocks per game	PPG	Points per game	**Bold**	Career high

=== College ===
Year	Team	GP	GS	MPG	FG%	3P%	FT%	RPG	APG	SPG	BPG	PPG
2021–22	Monroe	32	32	34.8	.449	.309	.826	7.4	3.0	3.4	.5	23.8
2022–23	Monroe	34	34	29.8	.495	.266	.642	5.6	4.1	2.4	.4	18.7
2023–24	Wagner	33	27	35.8	.386	.265	.748	5.7	3.5	1.4	.6	14.9
2024–25	St. Bonaventure	34	34	37.1	.435	.299	.819	5.4	4.1	2.1	.4	14.6
2025–26	Kansas	35	35	34.8	.392	.308	.775	5.0	5.1	1.0	.3	12.7
