= Todd Phillips (basketball) =

American basketball player and coach (born 1973)

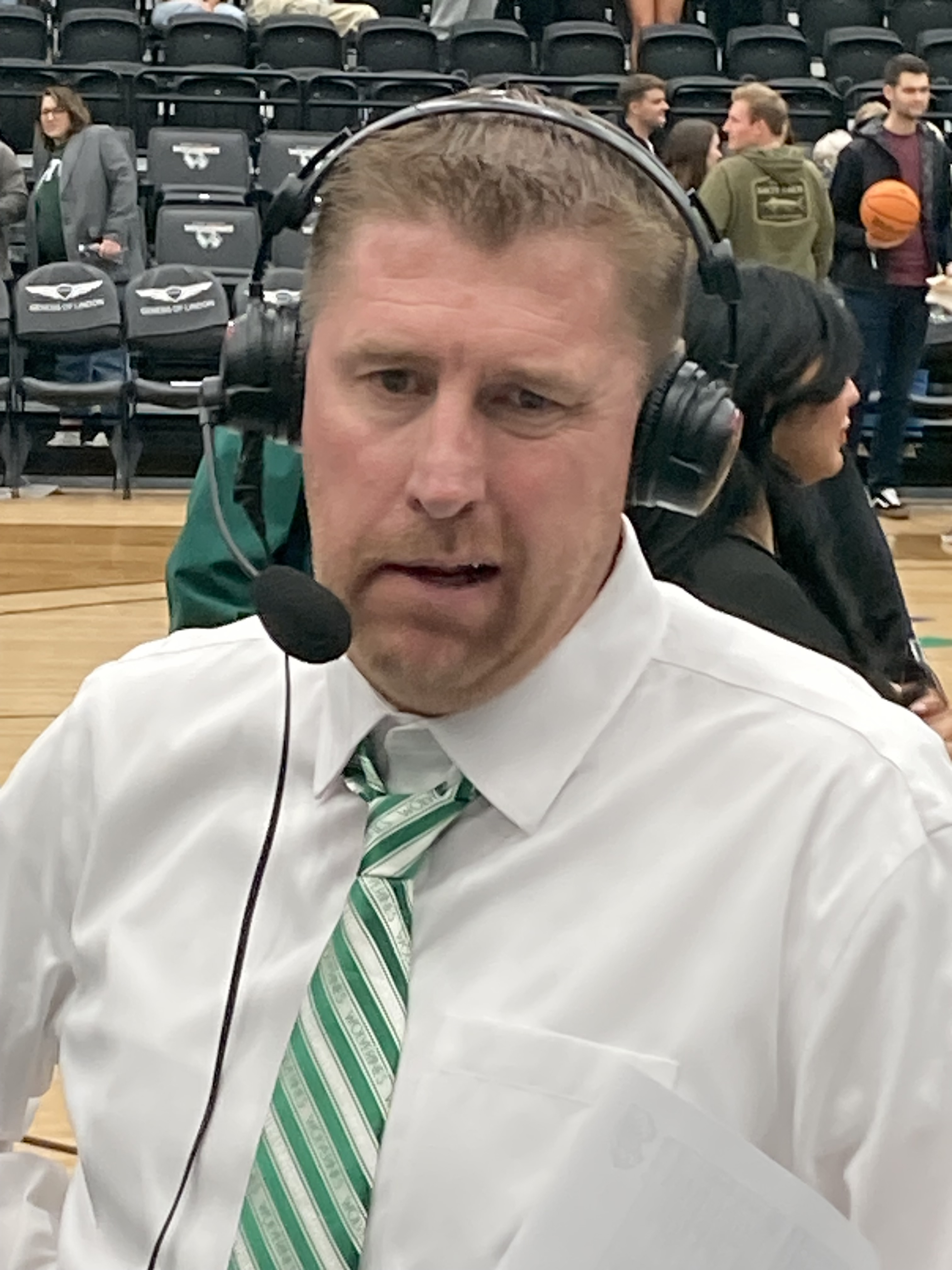
- Phillips in 2024

Current position
- Title: Head coach
- Team: Utah Valley
- Conference: Big West
- Record: 66–34 (.660)

Biographical details
- Born: November 25, 1973 (age 52); Boise, Idaho, U.S.
- Education: Lewis–Clark State (B.S., 1999); Utah (M.S., 2003)

Playing career
- 1995–1997: Snow College
- 1997–1999: Lewis–Clark State

Coaching career (HC unless noted)
- 2000–2008: Westminster (assistant)
- 2008–2011: Salt Lake (assistant)
- 2011–2019: Salt Lake
- 2019–2021: Utah Valley (assistant)
- 2021–2023: Utah Valley (associate HC)
- 2023–present: Utah Valley

Head coaching record
- Overall: 66–34 (.660) (NCAA); 205–58 (.779) (NJCAA)

Accomplishments and honors

Championships
- NJCAA Division I tournament (2016); 4 Scenic West tournament (2013, 2014, 2016, 2018); 2 Scenic West regular season (2013, 2018); 2 WAC regular season (2025–2026)

Awards
- 3× Scenic West Coach of the Year (2013, 2015, 2018); WAC Coach of the Year (2025)

Todd Douglas Phillips (born November 25, 1973) is an American college basketball coach who is currently the head coach of the Utah Valley Wolverines team.

== Playing career ==
Phillips played college basketball at Snow College for a pair of seasons before finishing his playing career at Lewis-Clark State.

== Coaching career ==
After graduation, Phillips' first college coaching job was as an assistant at Westminster College for eight seasons, before spending another three at Salt Lake Community College. In 2011, Phillips was named the head coach at Salt Lake, where in eight seasons he compiled a 205–58 overall record, including winning the NJCAA Men's Division I Basketball Championship in 2016. During his time at Salt Lake, Phillips coached multiple NCAA Division I players, plus NBA player Gary Payton II.

In 2019, Phillips would join Mark Madsen's coaching staff at Utah Valley, where he became the team's associate head coach and was on staff for two WAC regular season titles, as well as the Wolverines' semifinal run in the 2023 NIT.

On April 6, 2023, Phillips was promoted to head coach at Utah Valley when Madsen accepted the head coaching position at Cal. Phillips proceeded to win 16 games that season, the most by any first-year head coach in Utah Valley men's basketball history since the Wolverines became a full Division I member in July 2009.

In his second season, Phillips led the Wolverines to a regular season WAC championship for the second time in three years, and their first-ever appearance in the WAC Tournament championship, losing to Grand Canyon. Phillips earned the WAC Coach of the Year honors and was rewarded with a two-year contract extension, keeping him at the school through 2027-28.

== Head coaching record ==
=== NCAA DI ===
Record table
Season	Team	Overall	Conference	Standing	Postseason
Utah Valley Wolverines (Western Athletic Conference) (2023–2026)
2023–24	Utah Valley	16–16	11–9	T–4th	
2024–25	Utah Valley	25–9	15–1	1st	NIT First Round
2025–26	Utah Valley	25–9	14–4	1st	NIT First Round
2026–27	Utah Valley	0–0	0–0		
Utah Valley:		66–34 (.660)	40–14 (.741)		
Total:		66–34 (.660)			
National champion Postseason invitational champion Conference regular season champion Conference regular season and conference tournament champion Division regular season champion Division regular season and conference tournament champion Conference tournament champion

=== NJCAA ===
Record table
Season	Team	Overall	Conference	Standing	Postseason
Salt Lake Bruins (Scenic West Athletic Conference) (2011–2019)
2011–12	Salt Lake	22–9	9–6	2nd	
2012–13	Salt Lake	29–5	14–1	1st	NJCAA Division I Second Round
2013–14	Salt Lake	27–7	11–4	2nd	NJCAA Division I First Round
2014–15	Salt Lake	25–6	13–2	2nd	
2015–16	Salt Lake	31–8	9–5	3rd	NJCAA Division I Champion
2016–17	Salt Lake	21–10	9–7	3rd	
2017–18	Salt Lake	30–4	10–2	1st	NJCAA Division I First Round
2018–19	Salt Lake	20–9	7–5	3rd	
Salt Lake:		205–58 (.779)	82–32 (.719)		
Total:		205–58 (.779)			
National champion Postseason invitational champion Conference regular season champion Conference regular season and conference tournament champion Division regular season champion Division regular season and conference tournament champion Conference tournament champion
