= Utah Valley Wolverines men's basketball =

NCAA Division 1 program

Utah Valley Wolverines men's Basketball
2026–27 Utah Valley Wolverines men's basketball team
- University: Utah Valley University
- First season: 1972–73; 54 years ago
- Athletic director: Dr. Jared Sumsion
- Head coach: Todd Phillips (4th season)
- Location: Orem, Utah
- Arena: UCCU Center (capacity: 8,500)
- NCAA division: Division I
- Conference: Big West
- Nickname: Wolverines
- Colors: Green and white
- Student section: The Den

Conference regular-season champions
- Great West: 2011, 2012 WAC: 2014, 2021, 2023, 2025, 2026

The Utah Valley Wolverines men's basketball team is a team that represents Utah Valley University in Orem, Utah, United States. The team is currently coached by Todd Phillips. The school's team currently competes in the Big West Conference of NCAA Division I college basketball. Its home games are played in the UCCU Center on the school's Orem, Utah campus. The Wolverines have yet to appear in the NCAA tournament since moving to Division I.

== Overview and history ==
Utah Valley University basketball formally began in the 1984–85 season as a member of the Scenic West Athletic Conference of the National Junior College Athletic Association. This continued until the 2003–04 season, when they moved up to Division I (provisional status) and the Great West Conference. They are the only team in NCAA history to move directly to Division I from the NJCAA. Utah Valley was granted full Division I status in July of 2009. After spending five seasons in the Great West, the Wolverines moved to the Western Athletic Conference, with the rest of Utah Valley University's intercollegiate sports teams. They reached their first conference tournament final in the WAC in 2025.

=== 2026 WAC Tournament controversy ===
In February 2026, the WAC filed a lawsuit against Utah Valley over a $1 million exit fee dispute related to the school's upcoming move to the Big West. The conference initially declared UVU a "member not in good standing" and threatened to exclude both the men's and women's teams from the 2026 WAC Basketball Tournaments. However, UVU successfully obtained a preliminary injunction from a Utah District Court, which ordered the conference to reinstate the program for postseason play. The dispute was temporarily resolved when UVU deposited the $1 million into a court-ordered escrow account just before the tournament began.

=== Big West move ===
On June 4, 2025, Utah Valley University officially announced it would join The Big West Conference as a full member, effective July 1, 2026. The move marks a return to the state of Utah for the conference for the first time since 2005. Upon joining, UVU will be the largest institution in the conference by enrollment, with approximately 48,000 students. The transition follows a period of significant growth for the program within the Western Athletic Conference (WAC).

== Coaches ==
=== List of coaches ===
- Sam Little (1972–1974)
- Harry Anderson (1974–1975)
- Gary Gardner (1975–1981)
- Vince Miner (1981–1986)
- Duke Reid (1986–1994)
- Jeff Reinert (1994–2002)
- Dick Hunsaker (2002–2015)
- Mark Pope (2015–2019)
- Mark Madsen (2019–2023)
- Todd Phillips (2023–present)

=== Coach of the year awards ===
- 2010–11 and 2011–12, Dick Hunsaker, Great West
- 2013–14, Dick Hunsaker, WAC
- 2022–23, Mark Madsen, WAC
- 2024–25, Todd Phillips, WAC

== Seasons ==
Record table
Season	Coach	Overall	Conference	Standing	Postseason
Utah Valley State College (Independent^{1}) (2003–2008)
2003–04	Dick Hunsaker	23–5			
2004–05	Dick Hunsaker	16–12			
2005–06	Dick Hunsaker	16–13			
2006–07	Dick Hunsaker	22–7			
2007–08	Dick Hunsaker	15–14			
Utah Valley (Great West Conference) (2008–2013)
2008–09	Dick Hunsaker	17–11		N/A^{2}	
2009–10	Dick Hunsaker	12–18	5–7	T-3rd	
2010–11	Dick Hunsaker	19–11	11–1	1st	
2011–12	Dick Hunsaker	20–13	9–1	1st	CIT First Round
2012–13	Dick Hunsaker	14–18	3–5	T-3rd	
Utah Valley (Western Athletic Conference) (2013–present)
2013–14	Dick Hunsaker	20–12	13–3	1st	NIT First Round
2014–15	Dick Hunsaker	11–19	5–9	6th	
2015–16	Mark Pope	12–18	6–8	5th	
2016–17	Mark Pope	17–17	6–8	5th	CBI Semifinals
2017–18	Mark Pope	23–11	10–4	2nd	CBI Quarterfinals
2018–19	Mark Pope	25–10	12–4	2nd	CBI Quarterfinals
2019–20	Mark Madsen	11–19	5–10	8th	
2020–21	Mark Madsen	11–11	9–4	T-1st	
2021–22	Mark Madsen	20–12	10–8	4th	
2022–23	Mark Madsen	28–9	15–3	1st	NIT Semifinals
2023–24	Todd Phillips	16–16	11–9	T-4th	
2024–25	Todd Phillips	25–9	15–1	1st	NIT First Round
2025–26	Todd Phillips	25–9	14–4	1st	NIT First Round
Total:		418–294 (.587)			
National champion Postseason invitational champion Conference regular season champion Conference regular season and conference tournament champion Division regular season champion Division regular season and conference tournament champion Conference tournament champion

1. Before 2003 Utah Valley State College was a Junior College. They received approval to begin transition to D1 status in Spring 2003. JC transitions to D1 require a 6-year transition period, meaning they weren't eligible for NCAA or NIT Tournament appearances until the 2009–10 season.
2. The Great West Conference announced the teams that were invited to join their conference during spring 2008. However most of the teams already had scheduled Independent schedules for the 2008–2009 season, so the conference held off on scheduling regular season matches and a conference tournament until 2009–10.

== Postseason results ==
=== NIT results ===
The Wolverines have appeared in the National Invitation Tournament (NIT) four times. In 2025, UVU made its third overall NIT appearance. Despite being the WAC's automatic qualifier, they played on the road against San Francisco, falling 79–70. This followed their historic 2023 run where they defeated New Mexico, Colorado, and Cincinnati to reach the NIT Final Four in Las Vegas. Their combined record in the NIT is 3–4.

Year	Round	Opponent	Result
2014	First Round	California	L 64-77
2023	First Round; Second Round; Quarterfinals; Semifinals	New Mexico; Colorado; Cincinnati; UAB	W 83–69; W 81–69; W 74-68; L 86–88^{OT}
2025	First Round	San Francisco	L 70–79
2026	First Round	George Washington	L 78–79

=== CIT results ===
The Wolverines have appeared in the CollegeInsider.com Postseason Tournament (CIT) one time. Their record is 0–1.

Year	Round	Opponent	Result
2012	First round	Weber State	L 69–72

=== CBI results ===
The Wolverines have appeared in the College Basketball Invitational (CBI) three times. Their combined record is 4–3.

Year	Round	Opponent	Result
2017	First round Quarterfinals; Semifinals	Georgia Southern; Rice; Wyoming	W 74–49; W 85–79; L 68–74
2018	First round Quarterfinals	Eastern Washington; San Francisco	W 87–65; L 73–78
2019	First round Quarterfinals	Cal State Northridge; South Florida	W 92–84; L 57–66

== Individual honors ==
=== All-Americans ===
- Isiah Williams (2011)
- Jake Toolson (2019)

=== Conference players of the year ===
- Stacey Knight (1994)
- Jon Mansbury (1996)
- Ronnie Price (2003)
- Isiah Williams (2011)
- Jake Toolson (2019)
- Fardaws Aimaq (2021)
- Dominick Nelson (2025)

=== Hall of fame ===
- Peter Martin
- Scott Pace
- Ronnie Price
- Duke Reid
- Stan Rose
- Brian Santiago

== Individual records ==
- Points scored, single game: 63, Ryan Toolson
- Points scored, season: 680, Ronnie Price
- Points scored, career: 2,163, Ryan Toolson
- Rebounds, single game: 25, Fardaws Aimaq
- Rebounds, season: 409, Fardaws Aimaq
- Rebounds, career: 1,012, Ben Aird
- Assists, single game: 14, Kenneth Randolph
- Assists, season: 205, Trevan Leonhardt
- Assists, career: 434, Holton Hunsaker
- Three-point field goals made, single game: 9, Jaden Jackson
- Three-point field goals made, season: 103, Ryan Toolson
- Three-point field goals made, career: 315, Ryan Toolson
- Steals, single game: 7, Ronnie Price
- Steals, season: 75, Jackson Holcombe
- Steals, career: 157, Holton Hunsaker
- Blocked shots, single game: 10, Ben Aird
- Blocked shots, season: 106, Aziz Bandaogo
- Blocked shots, career: 181, Ben Aird

== Team records ==
- Most wins in a season: 28, 2022–23 season
- Longest winning streak: 11, 2022–23 season
- Longest home-court winning streak: 27, November 4, 2024 – February 28, 2026
- Largest margin of victory: 81, November 4, 2025 vs. West Coast Baptist, 116–35.
- Most points in a game: 123, January 29, 2009 vs. Chicago State
- Most three point field goals made, single game: 18, November 26, 2016 vs. BYU
- Most rebounds, single game: 67, November 4, 2025 vs. West Coast Baptist
- Most assists, single game: 32, December 14, 2017 vs. Bethesda and November 4, 2025 vs. West Coast Baptist
- Most steals, single game: 13, November 4, 2025 vs. West Coast Baptist
- Most blocked shots, single game: 12, January 5, 2013 vs. NJIT

== Wolverines who have played in professional leagues ==
=== National Basketball Association ===
3 former Utah Valley players have played at least one game in the NBA.

Name	Draft Year	Draft Team
Travis Hansen	2003	Atlanta Hawks
Michael McDonald	1995	Golden State Warriors
Ronnie Price	2005	Undrafted

=== Other professional leagues ===
- Fardaws Aimaq - B.League (Japan)
- Brandon Averette - Men's Premier League (Iceland)
- Justin Baker - Korisliiga (Finland)
- Aziz Bandaogo - Turkish Basketball Super League (Turkey)
- Jordan Brady - NBA G League
- Nick DeWitz - Portuguese Basketball League (Portugal)
- Justin Harmon - NBA G League
- Paul Henare - National Basketball League (New Zealand)
- Kenneth Ogbe - Basketball Bundesliga (Germany)
- Tyray Petty - NBA G League
- Brandon Randolph - Chinese Basketball Association (China)
- Brian Santiago - Baloncesto Superior Nacional (Puerto Rico)
- Seth Scott - Baloncesto Superior Nacaional (Puerto Rico)
- Baylee Steel - I Liga (Poland)
- Caelan Tiongson - Philippine Basketball Association (Philippines)
- Conner Toolson - Primera FEB (Spain)
- Jake Toolson - Basketball Bundesliga (Germany)
- Ryan Toolson - Liga ACB (Spain)
- TJ Washington - Cyprus Basketball Division A (Cyprus)
- Trey Woodbury - LNB Élite (France)
- Ivory "Trey" Young - Victorian Basketball League (Australia)

== Rivalries ==
- Old Hammer Rivalry: The Wolverines maintain an intense in-state rivalry with Utah Tech (formerly Dixie State), a matchup rooted in their shared history as junior college powerhouses.
- Crosstown Clash (BYU): UVU has seen increased success in its "Crosstown Clash" with BYU, securing notable back-to-back victories in their most recent matchups back in 2021 and 2022.
- Southern Utah: The rivalry with in-state foe Southern Utah reached new heights in 2026 when UVU clinched its second straight conference title on the Thunderbirds' home court in Cedar City.

== See also ==
- Utah Valley Wolverines women's basketball
