= Killyan Toure =

French basketball player

No. 27 – Iowa State Cyclones
- Position: Point guard
- League: Big 12 Conference

Personal information
- Born: 15 June 2006 (age 20)
- Listed height: 6 ft 3 in (1.91 m)
- Listed weight: 205 lb (93 kg)

Career information
- High school: Brewster Academy (Wolfeboro, New Hampshire)
- College: Iowa State (2025–present)
- Playing career: 2021–present

Career history
- 2021–2024: ASVEL Basket

Killyan Toure (born 15 June 2006) is a French college basketball player for the Iowa State Cyclones of the Big 12 Conference.

== Early life and high school ==
Toure is originally from France, where he played for ASVEL Basket Lyon-Villeurbanne. He averaged 23.7 minutes, 10.2 points, 3.3 rebounds and 3.0 assists across 22 games in the French ProA U21 competition. He moved to the United States, where he attended Brewster Academy in Wolfeboro, New Hampshire. Coming out of high school, Toure committed to play college basketball for the Iowa State Cyclones.

== College career ==
Toure entered his true freshman season in 2025 as a starter for the Cyclones. On November 25, 2025, he recorded a career-high 20 points, along with four rebounds, an assist, and a steal in a win over Creighton. On November 26, Toure totaled 19 points, six assists, and three steals in a victory versus Syracuse.
