= Players Era Festival =

College basketball tournament

- Current season, competition or edition: 2026 Players Era Festival
- Sport: College basketball
- Founded: 2024
- Founder: EverWonder Studio and Seth Berger
- No. of teams: 8 (2024); 18 (2025); 16 & 8 (2026)
- Country: United States
- Venues: Michelob Ultra Arena; T-Mobile Arena (Las Vegas, Nevada)
- Most recent champions: Michigan (Men's); Texas (Women's)
- Most titles: Men's: Michigan & Oregon (1); Women's: Texas (1)
- Broadcaster: ESPN
- Tournament format: Elimination (2024 & 2026); Swiss (2025)
- Website: PlayersEra.com

The Players Era Festival is an American early-season college basketball tournament. The tournament takes place in Las Vegas, Nevada, with games being played at Michelob Ultra Arena and T-Mobile Arena during the Thanksgiving week. The tournament was created to give at least $1 million toward each team's name, image and likeness (NIL). The inaugural edition was played during the men's basketball season in 2024. A womens's tournament was created in 2025.

== History ==
In August 2024, the NCAA sent out a memo reiterating that players could not be directly compensated for participating in an MTE, even if the money was routed through a collective. EverWonder claimed that players would participate in sponsorship opportunities on behalf of the event that would allow for NIL compensation, with this compensation being described in agreements between EverWonder and the schools' NIL collectives, but not in the agreements between EverWonder and the schools themselves.

The following month, a financial representative for the event informed Sportico that an announcement would be made soon for the sponsor and TV partner. The publication questioned the event's prospective profitability, as other MTEs bring in between $1–3 million, far below the potential amount needed to make the event profitable.

On December 16, 2024, it was announced there will be an inaugural Players Era Women's Championship in 2025, which featured four teams and took place over three days during Thanksgiving week in Las Vegas. The women's iteration coincided with the men's tournament, which featured 16 teams. The men had a Swiss-system tournament, with the team with the best record and largest point differential crowned champion.

On November 24, 2025, the Big 12 Conference announced a five-year deal to take a 15% equity stake in the Players Era Festival, along with a minimum guarantee from annual revenues and the Big 12 receiving eight bids to the Players Era tournament upon expansion. In May 2026, it was announced ESPN held the broadcasting rights moving forward and that the men’s field would feature 24 total teams. There would be an 8-team tournament on November 16 and a separate 16-team tournament on November 24, with each championship going back to a bracketed elimination event.

== Tournament history ==
=== Men's tournament ===
Year	Champion	Runner-up	Score	MVP
2024	Oregon	Alabama	83–81	TJ Bamba, Oregon
2025	Michigan	Gonzaga	101–61	Yaxel Lendeborg, Michigan
2026 – Players Era 8	TBD	TBD	–	TBD
2026 – Players Era 16 Bracket 1	TBD	TBD	–	TBD
2026 – Players Era 16 Bracket 2	TBD	TBD	–	TBD

=== Women's tournament ===
Year	Champion	Runner-up	Score	MVP
2025	Texas	South Carolina	66–64	Rori Harmon, Texas
