= Sam Little (basketball) =

American basketball player and coach (born 1945)

Personal information
- Born: March 29, 1945 (age 81)
- Listed height: 6 ft 0 in (1.83 m)
- Listed weight: 180 lb (82 kg)

Career information
- High school: Carmago/Montgomery County (Mount Sterling, Kentucky)
- College: Delta State (1965–1969)
- NBA draft: 1969: undrafted
- Position: Guard
- Number: 40

Career history

Playing
- 1970: Kentucky Colonels

Coaching
- 1972–1974: Utah Valley

Career highlights
- AP Little All-American First Team (1969)
- Stats at Basketball Reference

Samuel Ray Little (born March 29, 1945) is a retired professional basketball player who spent one season in the American Basketball Association (ABA) as a member of the Kentucky Colonels during the 1969–70 season after a successful college career at Delta State University. While he was not drafted into the National Basketball Association (NBA) after graduating from Delta State, the New Orleans Buccaneers did select him in the 1969 ABA Draft.

Little was also a coach, heading Utah Valley University's men's basketball team for the first two seasons in the program's history (1972–1974).
