= 2024 Players Era Festival =

College basketball tournament

- Season: 2024–25
- Teams: 8
- Finals site: MGM Grand Garden Arena, (Las Vegas, Nevada)
- Champions: Oregon (1st title)
- Runner-up: Alabama
- MVP: TJ Bamba (Oregon)

The 2024 Players Era Festival was an early-season men's college basketball tournament. It was first edition of the Players Era Festival and was played from November 26 to November 30, 2024. Oregon won the tournament.

== Overview ==
The tournament was created to give each team at least $1 million toward each team's Name, Image and Likeness (NIL).

In August 2024, the NCAA sent out a memo reiterating that players could not be directly compensated for participating in an MTE, even if the money was routed through a collective. EverWonder claimed that players would participate in sponsorship opportunities on behalf of the event that would allow for NIL compensation, with this compensation being described in agreements between EverWonder and the schools' NIL collectives, but not in the agreements between EverWonder and the schools themselves.

The following month, a financial representative for the event informed Sportico that an announcement would be made soon for the sponsor and TV partner. The publication questioned the event's prospective profitability, as other MTEs bring in between $1–3 million, far below the potential amount needed to make the event profitable.

== Teams ==
Rankings from the AP poll

Team	Conference
San Diego State	Mountain West
No. 21 Creighton	Big East
Oregon	Big Ten
No. 20 Texas A&M	SEC
No. 6 Houston	Big 12
No. 9 Alabama	SEC
Rutgers	Big Ten
Notre Dame	ACC

== Bracket ==
=== Power Division ===
Game 1 November 26; TBS/Max
	San Diego State	71
21	Creighton	53

Game 1 November 26; TBS/Max
	Oregon	80
20	Texas A&M	70

Game 2 November 27; Max
Oregon	78
San Diego State	68

Game 2 November 27; Max
20	Texas A&M	77
21	Creighton	73

=== Impact Division ===
Game 1 November 26; TBS/Max
6	Houston	80
9	Alabama	85*

Game 1 November 26; TBS/Max
Rutgers	85*
Notre Dame	84

Game 2 November 27; TBS/Max
	Rutgers	90
9	Alabama	95

Game 2 November 27; TBS/Max
	Notre Dame	54
6	Houston	65

=== Championship Day ===
7th Place Game; November 30; TruTV/Max
21	Creighton	80
	Notre Dame	76

5th Place Game; November 30; TruTV/Max
20	Texas A&M	81
	Rutgers	77

3rd Place Game; November 30; TNT/Max
	San Diego State	73*
6	Houston	70

Championship Game; November 30; TNT/Max
	Oregon	83
9	Alabama	81

== All-Tournament team ==
MVP in bold

Player	Position	Team
**TJ Bamba**	**Guard**	**Oregon**
Dylan Harper	Guard	Rutgers
Wade Taylor IV	Guard	Texas A&M
Miles Byrd	Guard	San Diego State
Mark Sears	Guard	Alabama

== Broadcasting ==
TNT Sports holds the exclusive rights to broadcast the 2024 Players Era Festival. Games aired across TNT, TBS, TruTV and Max. All games additionally streamed on Max, two games were exclusive to the streaming service.

The broadcast teams were as follows:

1. Brian Anderson, Grant Hill, Allie LaForce
2. JB Long, Candace Parker, Lauren Jbara
