= Trey Woodbury =

American basketball player (born 1999)

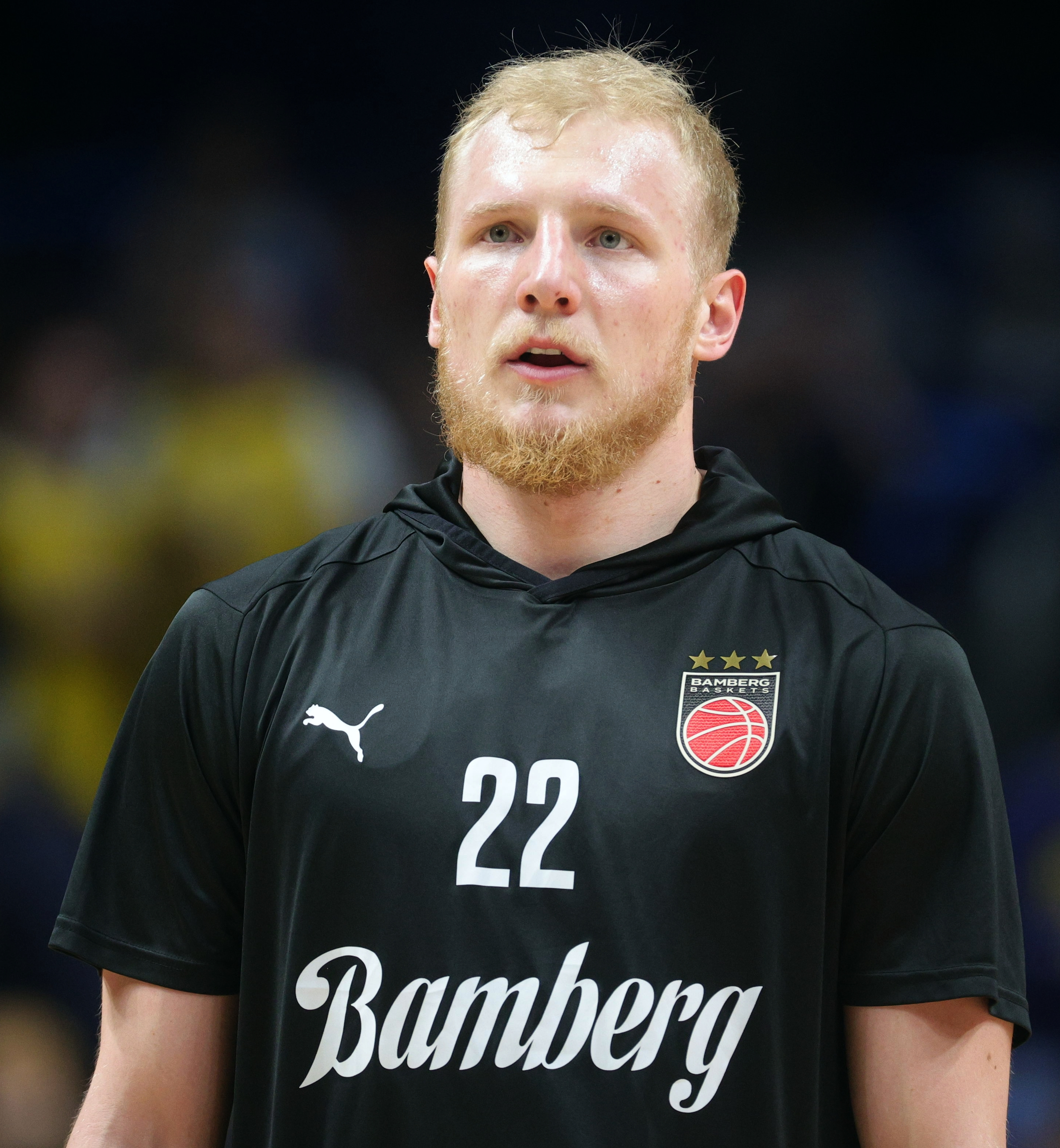

No. 22 – JL Bourg
- Position: Point guard / shooting guard
- League: LNB Élite; EuroCup

Personal information
- Born: September 17, 1999 (age 27) Las Vegas, Nevada, U.S.
- Listed height: 6 ft 4 in (1.93 m)
- Listed weight: 200 lb (91 kg)

Career information
- High school: Ed W. Clark (Las Vegas, Nevada)
- College: UNLV (2018–2019); Utah Valley (2019–2023)
- NBA draft: 2023: undrafted
- Playing career: 2023–present

Career history
- 2023–2024: Brose Bamberg
- 2024–2025: Aris Thessaloniki
- 2025–2026: U-BT Cluj-Napoca
- 2026–present: JL Bourg

Career highlights
- First-team All-WAC (2023); Romanian Cup winner (2026); Romanian League champion (2025–2026); Romanian Supercup winner (2025–2026)

Trey Leavitt Woodbury (born September 17, 1999) is an American professional basketball player for JL Bourg of the LNB Pro A and the EuroCup. He played college basketball for UNLV and Utah Valley.

== Early life and high school career ==
Woodbury was born in Las Vegas, Nevada. He played high school basketball for Clark High School. He was a nominee for Nevada's player of the year in 2017 and a national top 100 recruit.

== College career ==
He played in 22 games his freshman year at University of Nevada, Las Vegas. Following the 2018–19 season, Woodbury transferred to Utah Valley University.

On March 3, 2023, Trey recorded a triple-double, making him the third player to record a triple double in UVU history.

On March 12, 2023, he became the 9th player in school history to have over 1000 career points.

While playing at Utah Valley University, Trey averaged 11.9 points, 3.3 assists, 4.8 rebounds, and 0.8 steals per game. He is one of nine Wolverines to have over 1000 career points; he sits 7th all-time among total career points for Utah Valley and 2nd all-time in total assists. In the 2022–23 NCAA Basketball season, Woodbury set a program record 174 assists over 37 games. Averaging approximately 1.5 more assists per game than his career average. This is the same season the Utah Valley Wolverines had a program record 28 wins and were semi-finalists in the National Invitational Tournament.

Trey spent most of the 2021–22 season recovering from injury resulting in him playing only 2 games. Both games were the last of the season for Utah Valley and thus counted as the a year of eligibility with the NCAA. He entered the transfer portal at the end of his 2022–23 season hoping to be granted a medical redshirt for the 2021–22 season but it was denied with his first appeal.

== Professional career ==
=== Brose Bamberg (2023–2024) ===
In August 2023, Woodbury started his professional career with Brose Bamberg in the Basketball Bundesliga.

In July 2024, The Indiana Pacers announced their 15-man roster for the NBA 2K25 Summer League which includes Woodbury.

=== Aris Thessaloniki (2024–2025) ===
On August 24, 2024, Woodbury signed with Greek club Aris Midea.

=== U-BT Cluj-Napoca (2025-2026) ===
On July 21, 2025, U-BT Cluj-Napoca signed Woodbury.
