= Dominick Nelson =

American basketball player (born 2003)

Personal information
- Listed height: 6 ft 5 in (1.96 m)
- Listed weight: 175 lb (79 kg)

Career information
- High school: TERRA Environmental (Kendall, Florida); Liberty Heights (Charlotte, North Carolina)
- College: Polk State (2022–2024); Utah Valley (2024–2025); Iowa State (2025–2026)
- NBA draft: 2026: undrafted
- Position: Small forward

Career highlights
- WAC Player of the Year (2025); First-team All-WAC (2025)

Dominick Nelson is an American basketball player. He played college basketball for the Polk State College Eagles, Utah Valley Wolverines and Iowa State Cyclones.

== High school career ==
Coming out of high school, Nelson received no Division I offers. He did a postgraduate year at Liberty Heights Athletic Institute in North Carolina. Nelson signed with Polk State College.

== College career ==
As a freshman, Nelson finished third on the team in scoring with 11.2 points per game. Nelson averaged 20.1 points and 1.7 steals per game as a sophomore, earning First Team All-Citrus Conference honors. He opted to transfer to Utah Valley. As a junior, Nelson averaged 14.4 points, 5.2 rebounds and 1.7 assists per game. He was named WAC Player of the Year. Following the season, Nelson transferred to Iowa State. He averaged 3.7 points and 0.9 rebounds per game off the bench. Nelson entered the transfer portal after the season.
