= Travis Hansen =

American basketball player (born 1978)

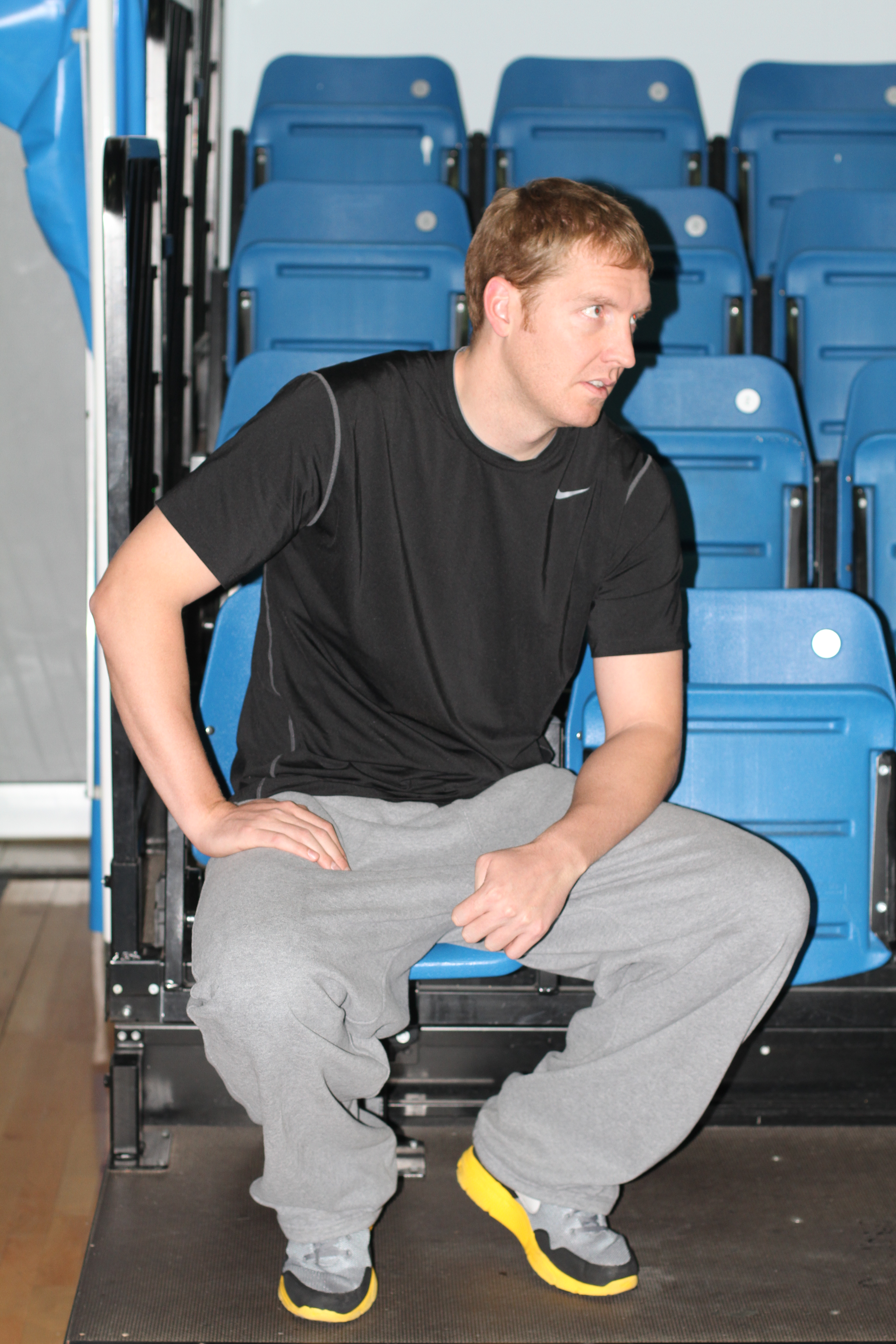

BYU Cougars
- Title: Senior associate athletic director
- Conference: Big 12 Conference

Personal information
- Born: April 15, 1978 (age 48) Provo, Utah, U.S.
- Listed height: 6 ft 6 in (1.98 m)
- Listed weight: 215 lb (98 kg)

Career information
- High school: Mountain View (Orem, Utah)
- College: Utah Valley (1996–1997); BYU (2000–2003)
- NBA draft: 2003: 2nd round, 37th overall pick
- Drafted by: Atlanta Hawks
- Playing career: 2003–2013
- Position: Shooting guard / small forward
- Number: 24, 2, 6

Career history
- 2003–2004: Atlanta Hawks
- 2004–2006: Saski Baskonia (TAU)
- 2006–2009: Dynamo Moscow
- 2009–2011: Real Madrid
- 2011–2013: Khimki

Career highlights
- All-EuroCup Second Team (2009); Spanish Supercup winner (2005); Spanish Cup winner (2006); VTB United League champion (2012); Mountain West Conference champion (2003); First-team All-MWC (2003); Second-team All-MWC (2002); MWC Defensive Player of the Year (2003)
- Stats at NBA.com
- Stats at Basketball Reference

Travis Mitchell Hansen (born April 15, 1978) is an American former professional basketball player. He played for the Atlanta Hawks of the National Basketball Association (NBA). Hansen played college basketball for Utah Valley and BYU.

Both his junior high school, Orem Junior High, and his high school, Mountain View High School, retired his jersey number, #24. Hansen was the first person inducted into his high school's hall of fame. He was drafted into the NBA by the Hawks, then played in the EuroLeague.

After retiring from professional basketball in 2013, Hansen founded Tesani Companies, a private equity and holding company based in Provo, Utah. Tesani oversees a diverse portfolio of businesses. In 2024, Tesani's subsidiary, Teamworks, was acquired by TPG, marking a significant milestone in the company's growth trajectory.

In July 2025, Hansen was appointed Senior Associate Athletic Director at BYU, where he leads the university’s Name, Image and Likeness (NIL) and revenue-sharing programs for all 21 NCAA Division I sports.

== Early life and education ==
Hansen was born on April 15, 1978, in Provo, Utah, to Scott W. Hansen and Laurie Ann Hansen (née Mitchell). His mother died of pancreatic cancer in 1997 when Hansen was 18 years old.

Hansen starred on his basketball team and graduated from Mountain View High School, where he averaged nearly a triple-double, 18.6 ppg, 8.4 rpg, 7.5 apg and was team captain of the Bruins when they were named Region Champions and Consolation Champions in 1996.

Hansen began his college basketball career at Utah Valley State College in his hometown of Orem, Utah, where he averaged 11.2 ppg and 3.6 rpg. and he received the Iron Man award.

Hansen went on to serve as a full-time missionary for the Church of Jesus Christ of Latter-day Saints in Santiago, Chile, for two years. One week after returning from his mission, he played in a tournament in California where he drove baseline and broke the backboard. That incident landed him in a Los Angeles hospital, where he received multiple stitches.

After being heavily recruited by Utah, Cal, Indiana, New Mexico, UNLV, Arizona, Arizona State, and many other teams, he signed for Brigham Young University. Hansen transferred from Utah Valley University to Brigham Young University, where he studied Community Health. He later earned a certificate of non-profit management from Duke University.

== College career ==
Attending Brigham Young University, Hansen played basketball for the BYU Cougars from 2000 to 2003. During his time there, he was also known as "Elder 8 Mile", for his similar appearance to rapper Eminem. He was a two-time All-MWC selection, MWC Defensive Player of the Year, and a two-time All-District selection. He finished with a 44–1 home record (all-time best in BYU history), won two MWC championships, and was selected with the 8th pick in the 2nd round in the NBA draft. With his selection by the Atlanta Hawks in 2003, he became the first BYU men's basketball player to be drafted since Shawn Bradley in 1993. Hansen served as a team captain and lead BYU to a Mountain West Conference Tournament championship, securing the team's first NCAA Tournament appearance since 1995. As a senior in 2003, he led the Cougars to another strong season, earning an at-large bid to the NCAA Tournament. He posted career highs of 30 points and 17 rebounds in a single game against Pepperdine during his junior year.

== Basketball career ==
Hansen was voted by ESPN as one of the top five guards in the NBA draft in 2003. His draft class included players LeBron James, Dwyane Wade, Carmelo Anthony, and Chris Bosh. Hansen was drafted by the Hawks in the second round of the 2003 NBA draft, 37th overall. He signed a shoe contract with Nike.

=== Atlanta Hawks ===
Hansen signed a two-year deal with the Atlanta Hawks following the draft. He played 41 games for them the first season, starting four, averaging 3.0 points per game. He had a stress fracture in his right foot that caused him to miss 40 games. His career-high was against the Boston Celtics; he played 41 minutes, scored 14 points, 6 rebounds and had 4 assists. His final NBA game was played on April 14, 2004, in a 132–137 loss to the Boston Celtics where he recorded 13 points, 6 rebounds, 4 assists, 1 steal and 1 block.

=== Spain: Tau Ceramica ===
In 2004–2005, he crossed the Atlantic to sign a two-year deal for TAU Ceramica, who won the 2005 Spanish Supercup, the 2006 Spanish King's Cup and back-to-back appearances in the EuroLeague Final Four and Spanish League Finals. He averaged 10.5 ppg and 3.3 rpg in his last year in Vitoria before heading to Dynamo Moscow. He was voted the favorite player in 2004 by fans in Vitoria, Spain.

=== Russia: Dynamo Moscow ===
In 2006, the ULEB Cup (now called EuroCup Basketball) champions Dynamo Moscow signed Hansen on a two-year contract. After helping his team reach the EuroLeague's Top-16 and averaging 15 ppg, he was placed on the injured list for the rest of the season after suffering a torn Achilles tendon. In 2007, Hansen helped Dynamo take third place in the ULEB Cup (EuroCup Basketball) and averaged 17.5 ppg, 3.3 rpg while shooting 56.4 FG and 46.3% 3PT.

In February 2008, Hansen extended his contract with Dynamo Moscow signing a three-year deal, and Russian president Vladimir Putin signed a decree giving Hansen Russian citizenship. In 2008–2009, Hansen, coached by David Blatt, again led Dynamo to the EuroCup final four in Turin, Italy, averaging 16.4 ppg. In March 2008, Hansen received Russian citizenship or a "red passport" in order to allow him to play for the senior men's Russian national basketball team at the 2008 Beijing Olympics. He was the second American player ever to receive a Russian passport. However, he did not actually play for Russia.

=== Spain: Real Madrid ===
In July 2009, he returned to the Spanish Liga ACB, signing a two-year contract with Spanish power Real Madrid. Hansen signed a shoe deal with Adidas who is the main sponsor of Real Madrid. Madrid revamped the entire roster signing many of the best players in Europe and also one of the best coaches in Ettore Messina. They reached the top 8 in EuroLeague, the Finals in the Spanish Supercup, and the Finals of the Spanish Cup.

In May 2010, during a practice session with Real Madrid, Hansen suffered a herniated disc and had to have a discectomy.

=== Russia: Khimki ===
In December 2010 he signed a contract with Khimki Moscow Region until the end of 2013 season. In April 2011, Hansen helped his team win the VTB United League championship by hitting five free throws in the last seconds of the game. He retired in September 2013.

== Executive career ==
In 2013, Hansen founded Tesani, a private equity and holding company. Today, Tesani oversees a broad portfolio of high-performing businesses in SaaS, fintech, insurance, and software development, and continues to expand its footprint across multiple industries. Under Hansen’s leadership, Tesani has scaled dramatically and led major strategic exits — including the 2024 acquisition of Teamworks by TPG and the Alkeme purchase of Tesani's insurance assets.

== Athletic administration ==
In July 2025, Hansen was named Senior Associate Athletic Director. In this executive capacity, he manages the department’s Name, Image, and Likeness (NIL) strategy and revenue-sharing programs across all 21 NCAA Division I sports. Similar to a professional franchise’s front office, Hansen directs athlete contract and partnership negotiations, oversees financial frameworks, and works closely with agents, sponsors, and athletes to ensure BYU remains competitive in a rapidly evolving college sports marketplace..

== Personal life ==
Hansen and his wife LaRee live in Mapleton, Utah. They have five children. Hansen and his family are active members of The Church of Jesus Christ of Latter-Day Saints, in which Hansen has served as a temple ordinance worker, high councilor, ward mission leader, elders quorum president, bishop, stake presidency counselor, and missionary in the Santiago West Chile mission.

The UVU basketball facility has a center named after Hansen. The new Travis Hansen Strength and Conditioning Center includes roughly 1,300 square feet, with custom-made nine-foot high racks, dumbbells up to 125 pounds, and an array of power and conditioning tools.

== Philanthropy ==
=== Sunshine Heroes Foundation ===
Hansen co-founded the Little Heroes Foundation, which has completed over 15 humanitarian projects worldwide, focusing on children's health and education. In 2013, the foundation officially changed its name to the Sunshine Heroes Foundation, representing a long-term partnership with the founding sponsor, Nature's Sunshine.

Brigham Young University gave Hansen the 2015 Distinguished Alumni Award for his work with Sunshine Heroes. The foundation has built 10 children's centers around the world including in Nepal, Africa, Russia, Thailand, Panama, Dominican Republic, and Nicaragua.

He has also been active in mentoring athletes transitioning to post-sports careers, leveraging his experience in both professional basketball and business.

== Awards and honors ==
- BYU's 2015 Young Alumni Distinguished Service Award
- Hansen was the recipient of UVU's 2024 Distinguished Alumni Award.
- Eddy named top 10 best HR software and payroll software
- Eddy named best company to work for, best HR/Staffing company, and best payroll service in 2022 and 2023.
- Tesani Companies: 5x consecutively: 2017, 2018, 2019, 2020 and 2021 Best Companies to work for
- Salt Lake Tribune named them one of the best companies to work for in 2018, 2019, 2020, 2021, 2022, and 2023
- Utah Valley Magazine named him one of the coolest entrepreneurs in 2018.
- Eddy voted number two best payroll company in Utah Valley in 2020, 2021, 2022, and 2023.
- Fortune Best Small Workplaces 2020
