= Blake Buchanan =

American basketball player

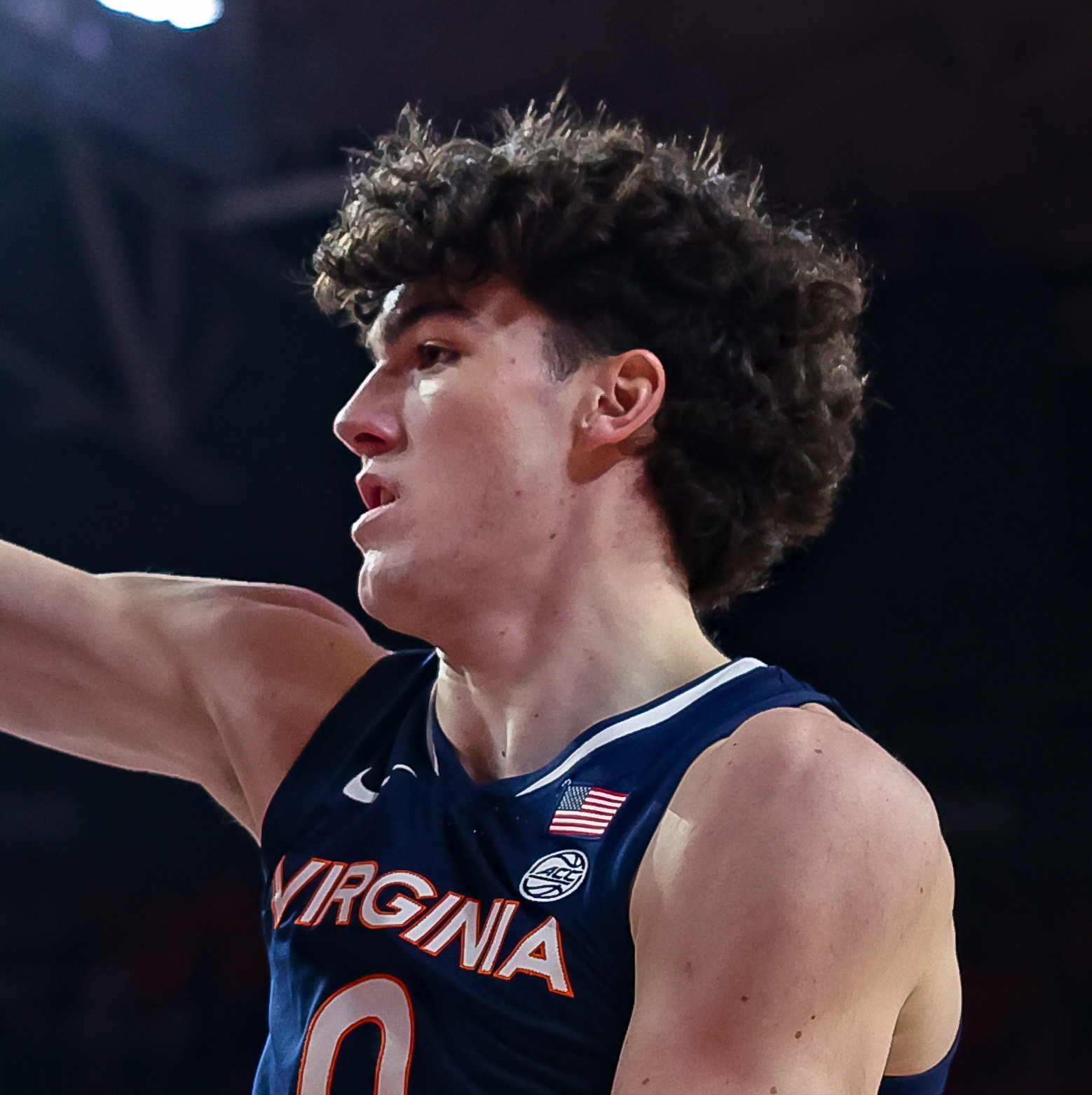

No. 23 – Iowa State Cyclones
- Position: Center
- League: Big 12 Conference

Personal information
- Listed height: 6 ft 10 in (2.08 m)
- Listed weight: 225 lb (102 kg)

Career information
- High school: Moscow (Moscow, Idaho); Lake City (Coeur d'Alene, Idaho)
- College: Virginia (2023–2025); Iowa State (2025–present)

Career highlights
- Nike Hoop Summit (2023)

Blake Buchanan is an American college basketball player for the Iowa State Cyclones of the Big 12 Conference. He previously played for the Virginia Cavaliers.

== Early life and high school career ==
Buchanan grew up in Moscow, Idaho and initially attended Moscow High School. He averaged 11 points and eight rebounds per game during his freshman year. Buchanan transferred to Lake City High School in Coeur d'Alene, Idaho after his freshman year. He averaged 13.7 points and 8.5 rebounds and was named first-team All-State during his junior season. Buchanan was named the Idaho Gatorade Player of the Year as a senior after averaging 15.2 points, 9.8 rebounds, 3 assists, 1.9 steals, and 1.9 blocks per game as Lake City went 26–0 and won the 5A state championship. Buchanan was also selected to play for Team USA in the Nike Hoops Summit.

Buchanan was a consensus four-star recruit and the best collegiate prospect in Idaho, according to major recruiting services. He committed to play college basketball at Virginia over offers from Gonzaga, Washington State, and Iowa.

== College career ==
At Virginia, Buchanan averaged 3.4 points and 3.1 rebounds per game as a freshman. Buchanan transferred to Iowa State following his sophomore year.

== Personal life ==
Buchanan's mother, Debbie Buchanan, was the head women's volleyball coach at the University of Idaho for 27 years. His father, Buck, played college football at Idaho as a tight end. Buchanan's older brother, Austin, plays college volleyball at the University of Hawaiʻi.
