= TERRA Environmental Research Institute =

Location
- 11005 S.W. 84th Street; Kendall, Florida 33173; United States; 25.6927685°N 80.3703343°W

Information
- School type: Public, magnet
- Established: 2009
- School district: Miami-Dade County Public Schools
- School number: 7029
- Principal: Jose Sirven
- Staff: 66.00 (FTE)
- Grades: 9-12
- Enrollment: 1,619 (2022–2023)
- Student to teacher ratio: 24.53
- Campus type: Suburban
- Colors: Green, Navy, and White
- Mascot: Wolf
- Accreditation: AdvancED
- Website: terrawolves.com

TERRA Environmental Research Institute is a secondary school in Miami, Florida, United States that opened in 2009. It is a LEED certified school.

This school has three magnet academies: Biomedical Research, Robotics & Engineering, and Environmental Research. Students have the option of supplementing their academy in the sophomore and junior year with the AP Capstone Program. The school was built to continue research while benefiting the environment. It offers many advanced programs, with some freshmen already being enrolled in Chemistry and Pre-Calculus the opening year.

== Admissions ==
As a magnet school, TERRA requires a minimum GPA of 2.5 in all Core classes, a 2.0 GPA in conduct, and effort grades of 2 or higher on a 3 point scale. Applicants must also have taken Algebra I and Physical Science before their freshman year. No more than 10 unexcused absences are permissible for admissions.

== Academics ==
Terra has an rotating (1, 3, 5; 2, 4, 6; 3, 5, 1; 4, 6, 2; 5, 1, 3; 6, 2, 4) three-block schedule, with a total of six class periods: One of these periods must be a course from the student's respective academy, four from their core classes (mathematics, language arts, science, and social studies), and one elective.

More than 20 Advanced Placement classes are offered across a variety of subjects, including:

- AP English Language and Composition
- AP English Literature and Composition
- AP Spanish Language and Culture
- AP Spanish Literature and Culture
- AP Calculus AB
- AP Precalculus
- AP Calculus BC
- AP Statistics
- AP Physics C: Mechanics
- AP Biology
- AP Chemistry
- AP Environmental Science
- AP World History: Modern
- AP European History
- AP United States History
- AP Art History
- AP Human Geography
- AP Psychology
- AP Studio Art

=== World languages ===
Florida students are required to earn two consecutive foreign language credits for graduation. TERRA offers courses in the Spanish language, French language, and Japanese language.

=== Performing and fine arts ===
Students are required to earn one credit in performing and fine arts for graduation. Choices include:

- T.V Production
- Drama
- Stagecraft
- Art/2-D/3-D Comprehensive
- Advanced Placement Studio Art
- Guitar, Band, and Chorus
- Speech and Debate

== Uniform ==
All students are required to wear a school uniform, which consists of either a white or hunter green polo bearing the school logo, navy blue pants, along with an I.D. issued by the school. Belts and I.D.s must be worn at all times. Sweaters can be blue, green, or white, and must also include the school logo. Undershirts should be solid colors, and must be hunter green, navy blue, or white.

== Student life ==
Parking is available for students on campus with a student parking decal. Student decals are $10 cash. Students can also join a club. The club fees vary but include HOSA (organization), VEX Robotics Competition, Student Government, and many others.

== Athletics ==
=== Physical education ===
All students are required to earn one physical education credit for graduation. Physical education consists of extensive conditioning, running, and playing sports, as well learning about nutrition, health, and the human body.

=== Sports ===
Students at Terra may participate in a variety of sports, that include the following:

Fall Sports-

- For Girls: Volleyball, golf, cross-country, swimming and bowling
- For Boys: Golf, cross-country, swimming and bowling

Winter Sports-

- For Girls: Basketball and soccer
- For Boys: Basketball and soccer

Spring Sports-

- For Girls: Flag football, softball, badminton, tennis, and water polo
- For Boys: Baseball, volleyball, badminton, tennis, and water polo
