= 2025 Big 12 men's basketball tournament =

American college basketball competition

- Classification: Division I
- Season: 2024–25
- Teams: 16
- Site: T-Mobile Center; Kansas City, Missouri
- Champions: Houston (1st title)
- Winning coach: Kelvin Sampson (4th title)
- MVP: Emanuel Sharp (Houston)
- Attendance: 106,259 (total); 13,768 (championship)
- Top scorers: Emanuel Sharp (Houston); Caleb Love (Arizona)
- Television: ESPN, ESPN2, ESPNU, ESPN+

2024–25 Big 12 men's basketball standings
| | Conf. | | | | Overall |
| Team | W | | L | PCT | W | | L | PCT |
|---|---|---|---|---|---|---|---|---|
| No. 2 Houston † | 19 | – | 1 | .950 | 35 | – | 5 | .875 |
| No. 8 Texas Tech | 15 | – | 5 | .750 | 28 | – | 9 | .757 |
| No. 15 Arizona | 14 | – | 6 | .700 | 24 | – | 13 | .649 |
| No. 13 BYU | 14 | – | 6 | .700 | 26 | – | 10 | .722 |
| No. 17 Iowa State | 13 | – | 7 | .650 | 25 | – | 10 | .714 |
| Kansas | 11 | – | 9 | .550 | 21 | – | 13 | .618 |
| Baylor | 10 | – | 10 | .500 | 20 | – | 15 | .571 |
| West Virginia | 10 | – | 10 | .500 | 19 | – | 13 | .594 |
| TCU | 9 | – | 11 | .450 | 16 | – | 16 | .500 |
| Kansas State | 9 | – | 11 | .450 | 16 | – | 17 | .485 |
| Utah | 8 | – | 12 | .400 | 16 | – | 17 | .485 |
| Oklahoma State | 7 | – | 13 | .350 | 17 | – | 18 | .486 |
| Cincinnati | 7 | – | 13 | .350 | 19 | – | 16 | .543 |
| UCF | 7 | – | 13 | .350 | 20 | – | 17 | .541 |
| Arizona State | 4 | – | 16 | .200 | 13 | – | 20 | .394 |
| Colorado | 3 | – | 17 | .150 | 14 | – | 21 | .400 |
† 2025 Big 12 tournament winner Rankings from AP poll

The 2025 Big 12 men's basketball tournament was a postseason men's basketball tournament for the Big 12 Conference. It was played from March 11–15, 2025, in Kansas City, Missouri at the T-Mobile Center. Houston received the conference's automatic bid to the 2025 NCAA Tournament. Due to a major conference realignment that significantly impacted the Big 12, it was the first tournament with 16 teams participating. At the beginning of the 2024–25 season, Arizona, Arizona State, and Utah joined the conference for the first time, and Colorado rejoined after a 13-year absence. The tournament will be sponsored by Phillips 66.

== Seeds ==
All sixteen teams participated in the tournament, which became the first with the 16-team bracket format. The top eight teams received a first round bye and the top four teams received a double bye into the quarterfinals.

Teams were seeded by record within the conference. Ties were broken by head-to-head results, then results vs. the top seed in the conference and going down the standings until the tie was broken.

| Seed | School | Conference Record | Tiebreak 1 | Tiebreak 2 |
|---|---|---|---|---|
| 1 | Houston #‡ | 19–1 | | |
| 2 | Texas Tech ‡ | 15–5 | | |
| 3 | Arizona ‡ | 14–6 | 1–1 vs BYU | 1–1 vs Texas Tech |
| 4 | BYU ‡ | 14–6 | 1–1 vs Arizona | 0–1 vs Texas Tech |
| 5 | Iowa State † | 13–7 | | |
| 6 | Kansas † | 11–9 | | |
| 7 | Baylor † | 10–10 | 1–0 vs West Virginia | |
| 8 | West Virginia † | 10–10 | 0–1 vs Baylor | |
| 9 | TCU | 9–11 | 1–0 vs Kansas State | |
| 10 | Kansas State | 9–11 | 0–1 vs TCU | |
| 11 | Utah | 8–12 | | |
| 12 | Oklahoma State | 7–13 | 2–1 vs Cincinnati/UCF | |
| 13 | Cincinnati | 7–13 | 1–1 vs Oklahoma State/UCF | |
| 14 | UCF | 7–13 | 1–2 vs Oklahoma State/Cincinnati | |
| 15 | Arizona State | 4–16 | | |
| 16 | Colorado | 3–17 | | |

Notes: # – Big 12 regular season champions, and tournament No. 1 seed
‡ – Received a double-bye into the conference tournament quarterfinal round
† – Received a single-bye into the conference tournament second round
Overall records include all games played in the 2025 Big 12 tournament.

== Schedule ==
| Game | Time* | Matchup^{#} | Final score | Television | Attendance |
First round – Tuesday, March 11
| 1 | 11:30 a.m. | No. 12 Oklahoma State vs No. 13 Cincinnati | 68–87 | ESPN+ | 6,406 |
| 2 | 2:00 p.m. | No. 9 TCU vs No. 16 Colorado | 67–69 | ESPN+ | 6,406 |
| 3 | 6:00 p.m. | No. 10 Kansas State vs No. 15 Arizona State | 71–66 | ESPN+ | 12,929 |
| 4 | 8:30 p.m. | No. 11 Utah vs No. 14 UCF | 72–87 | ESPN+ | 12,929 |
Second round – Wednesday, March 12
| 5 | 11:30 a.m. | No. 5 Iowa State vs No. 13 Cincinnati | 76–56 | ESPN | 12,922 |
| 6 | 2:00 p.m. | No. 8 West Virginia vs No. 16 Colorado | 60–67 | ESPN+ | 12,922 |
| 7 | 6:00 p.m. | No. 7 Baylor vs No. 10 Kansas State | 70–56 | ESPN+ | 15,431 |
| 8 | 8:30 p.m. | No. 6 Kansas vs No. 14 UCF | 98–94^{OT} | ESPN2 | 15,431 |
Quarterfinals – Thursday, March 13
| 9 | 11:30 a.m. | No. 4 BYU vs No. 5 Iowa State | 96–92 | ESPN2 | 15,366 |
| 10 | 2:00 p.m. | No. 1 Houston vs No. 16 Colorado | 77–68 | ESPN2 | 15,366 |
| 11 | 6:00 p.m. | No. 2 Texas Tech vs No. 7 Baylor | 76–74 | ESPN | 15,491 |
| 12 | 8:30 p.m. | No. 3 Arizona vs No. 6 Kansas | 88–77 | ESPN | 15,491 |
Semifinals – Friday, March 14
| 13 | 6:00 p.m. | No. 1 Houston vs No. 4 BYU | 74–54 | ESPN2 | 13,946 |
| 14 | 8:30 p.m. | No. 2 Texas Tech vs No. 3 Arizona | 80–86 | ESPN2 | 13,946 |
Championship – Saturday, March 15
| 15 | 5:00 p.m. | No. 1 Houston vs No. 3 Arizona | 72–64 | ESPN | 13,768 |
*Game times in CDT. #-Rankings denote tournament seed.

== Bracket ==
First round Tuesday, March 11
9 | TCU | 67
16 | Colorado | 69
12 | Oklahoma State | 68
13 | Cincinnati | 87
10 | Kansas State | 71
15 | Arizona State | 66
11 | Utah | 72
14 | UCF | 87

Second round Wednesday, March 12
8 | West Virginia | 60
16 | Colorado | 67
5 | Iowa State | 76
13 | Cincinnati | 56
7 | Baylor | 70
10 | Kansas State | 56
6 | Kansas | 98^{OT}
14 | UCF | 94

Quarterfinals; Thursday, March 13
1 | Houston | 77
16 | Colorado | 68
4 | BYU | 96
5 | Iowa State | 92
2 | Texas Tech | 76
7 | Baylor | 74
3 | Arizona | 88
6 | Kansas | 77

Semifinals; Friday, March 14
1 | Houston | 74
4 | BYU | 54
2 | Texas Tech | 80
3 | Arizona | 86

Championship; Saturday, March 15
1 | Houston | 72
3 | Arizona | 64

== Awards and honors ==
=== Team and tournament leaders ===
| Team | Points | | Rebounds | | Assists | | Steals | | Blocks | | Minutes | |
| Arizona | Caleb Love | 57 | Tobe Awaka | 17 | KJ Lewis | 10 | KJ Lewis | 6 | Tied | 3 | Jaden Bradley | 113 |
| Arizona State | Alston Mason | 17 | Shawn Phillips Jr. | 14 | Tied | 3 | Joson Sanon | 2 | Shawn Phillips Jr. | 3 | Joson Sanon | 39 |
| Baylor | Norchad Omier | 41 | Norchad Omier | 29 | V. J. Edgecombe | 8 | V. J. Edgecombe | 5 | Tied | 2 | V. J. Edgecombe | 72 |
| BYU | Richie Saunders | 33 | Keba Keita | 22 | Dallin Hall | 11 | Trey Stewart | 4 | Keba Keita | 3 | Richie Saunders | 56 |
| Cincinnati | Day Day Thomas | 30 | Dillon Mitchell | 20 | Dillon Mitchell | 7 | Day Day Thomas | 10 | Aziz Bandaogo | 4 | Josh Reed | 67 |
| Colorado | Andrej Jakimovski | 24 | Andrej Jakimovski | 21 | Julian Hammond III | 11 | Andrej Jakimovski | 9 | Trevor Baskin | 4 | Andrej Jakimovski | 93 |
| Houston | Emanuel Sharp | 62 | Mylik Wilson | 24 | Milos Uzan | 10 | Tied | 5 | Joseph Tugler | 8 | LJ Cryer | 102 |
| Iowa State | Curtis Jones | 39 | Dishon Jackson | 20 | Joshua Jefferson | 11 | Joshua Jefferson | 5 | Dishon Jackson | 3 | Joshua Jefferson | 72 |
| Kansas | Zeke Mayo | 43 | Hunter Dickinson | 25 | Dajuan Harris Jr. | 10 | KJ Adams Jr. | 4 | KJ Adams Jr. | 3 | KJ Adams Jr. | 75 |
| Kansas State | Coleman Hawkins | 31 | Coleman Hawkins | 15 | Dug McDaniel | 10 | Dug McDaniel | 3 | Coleman Hawkins | 2 | Coleman Hawkins | 76 |
| Oklahoma State | Connor Dow | 12 | Brandon Newman | 7 | Arturo Dean | 4 | Arturo Dean | 7 | Bryce Thompson | 1 | Tied | 27 |
| TCU | Noah Reynolds | 17 | Ernest Udeh Jr. | 11 | Tied | 2 | Trazarien White | 3 | Tied | 2 | Trazarien White | 35 |
| Texas Tech | JT Toppin | 37 | JT Toppin | 16 | Elijah Hawkins | 16 | Elijah Hawkins | 3 | JT Toppin | 5 | Christian Anderson | 70 |
| UCF | Keyshawn Hall | 48 | Moustapha Thiam | 20 | Darius Johnson | 12 | Jordan Ivy-Curry | 5 | Thiam | 4 | Keyshawn Hall | 80 |
| Utah | Keanu Dawes | 21 | Keanu Dawes | 15 | Tied | 4 | Gabe Madsen | 3 | Mike Sharavjamts | 1 | Keanu Dawes | 38 |
| West Virginia | Javon Small | 23 | Amani Hansberry | 6 | Javon Small | 5 | Sencire Harris | 3 | Eduardo Andre | 5 | Javon Small | 37 |

=== All-Tournament Team ===
| Name | Pos. | Height | Weight | Year | Team |
|---|---|---|---|---|---|
| Caleb Love | G | 6−4 | 205 | Graduate | Arizona |
| LJ Cryer | G | 6−1 | 200 | Graduate | Houston |
| Emanuel Sharp | G | 6−3 | 210 | RS Junior | Houston |
| Milos Uzan | G | 6−4 | 190 | Junior | Houston |
| JT Toppin | F | 6−9 | 225 | Sophomore | Texas Tech |

=== Most Outstanding Player ===
| Name | Pos. | Height | Weight | Year | Team |
|---|---|---|---|---|---|
| Emanuel Sharp | G | 6−3 | 210 | RS Junior | Houston |
