= 2024–25 Arizona State Sun Devils men's basketball team =

American college basketball season

2024–25 Arizona State Sun Devils men's basketball

Acrisure Classic champions

College Basketball Crown, First Round
- Conference: Big 12 Conference
- Record: 13–20 (4–16 Big 12)
- Head coach: Bobby Hurley (10th season)
- Associate head coach: Jerrance Howard (1st season)
- Assistant coaches: Nick Irvin (2nd season); Yusuf Ali (2nd season)
- Home arena: Desert Financial Arena

2024–25 Big 12 men's basketball standings
	Conf.				Overall
Team	W		L	PCT	W		L	PCT
No. 2 Houston †	19	–	1	.950	35	–	5	.875
No. 8 Texas Tech	15	–	5	.750	28	–	9	.757
No. 15 Arizona	14	–	6	.700	24	–	13	.649
No. 13 BYU	14	–	6	.700	26	–	10	.722
No. 17 Iowa State	13	–	7	.650	25	–	10	.714
Kansas	11	–	9	.550	21	–	13	.618
Baylor	10	–	10	.500	20	–	15	.571
West Virginia	10	–	10	.500	19	–	13	.594
TCU	9	–	11	.450	16	–	16	.500
Kansas State	9	–	11	.450	16	–	17	.485
Utah	8	–	12	.400	16	–	17	.485
Oklahoma State	7	–	13	.350	17	–	18	.486
Cincinnati	7	–	13	.350	19	–	16	.543
UCF	7	–	13	.350	20	–	17	.541
Arizona State	4	–	16	.200	13	–	20	.394
Colorado	3	–	17	.150	14	–	21	.400
† 2025 Big 12 tournament winner Rankings from AP poll

The 2024–25 Arizona State Sun Devils men's basketball team represented Arizona State University during the 2024–25 NCAA Division I men's basketball season. The Sun Devils, led by 10th-year head coach Bobby Hurley, played their home games at Desert Financial Arena in Tempe, Arizona as first-year members of the Big 12 Conference. The team finished the season 13–20, 4–16 in Big 12 play to finish in 15th place. They lost to Kansas State in the first round of the Big 12 tournament. The Sun Devils were selected to participate in the inaugural 2025 College Basketball Crown tournament, where they lost in the first round to Nebraska.

== Previous season ==
The Sun Devils finished the 2023–24 season 14–18, 8–12 in Pac-12 play to finish in a three-way tie for ninth place. As the No. 11 seed in the Pac-12 tournament, they lost to Utah in the first round.

The season marked the school's last as a member of the Pac-12 Conference, as the team left to join the Big 12 following the season.

== Off-season ==
=== Departures ===
Name	Pos.	Height	Weight	Year	Hometown	Reason for departure	Sources
Jamiya Neal	G/F	6'6"	184	Jr.	Toledo, OH	Transferred to Creighton	
Braelon Green	G	6'3"	185	Fr.	Southfield, MI	Transferred to Bowling Green	
Akil Watson	F	6'9"	205	Fr.	Middletown, NY	Transferred to UMass	
Frankie Collins	G	6'1"	185	Jr.	Sacramento, CA	Transferred to TCU	
Zane Meeks	F	6'9"	220	GS	Prairie Village, KS	Transferred to Wichita State	
Bryant Selebangue	F	6'8"	225	Sr.	Montreal, QC	Transferred to McNeese	
Kamari Lands	G/F	6'8"	220	So.	Indianapolis, IN	Transferred to Middle Tennessee	
Jose Perez	G	6'5"	220	GS	The Bronx, New York	Exhausted eligibility	
Malachi Davis	G	6'4"	175	Sr.	Toronto, ON	Transferred to LIU	
Alonzo Gaffney	F/C	6'9"	200	GS	Cleveland, Ohio	Exhausted eligibility	

=== Incoming transfers ===
Name	Pos.	Height	Weight	Year	Previous school	Notes
Basheer Jihad	F	6'9"	240	Sr.	Ball State	
Austin Nunez	G	6'2"	170	Jr.	Ole Miss	
BJ Freeman	G	6'6"	200	Sr.	Milwaukee	
Alston Mason	G	6'2"	170	Sr.	Missouri State	
Brandon Gardner	F	6'8"	215	RS Fr.	USC	

=== Recruiting class ===
College recruiting
Name	Hometown	School	Height	Weight	Commit date
Jayden Quaintance*; F	Cleveland, OH	Word of God Christian Academy	6 ft 9 in (2.06 m)	230 lb (100 kg)	Apr 29, 2024
Jayden Quaintance*; F	Recruit ratings: Scout: Rivals: 247Sports: ESPN: (91)				
Amier Ali; F	Columbus, OH	Canyon International Academy	6 ft 8 in (2.03 m)	175 lb (79 kg)	Oct 30, 2023
Amier Ali; F	Recruit ratings: Scout: Rivals: 247Sports: ESPN: (87)				
Joson Sanon*; G	Fall River, MA	Vermont Academy (VT)	6 ft 5 in (1.96 m)	200 lb (91 kg)	May 29, 2024
Joson Sanon*; G	Recruit ratings: Rivals: 247Sports: ESPN: (89)				
Overall recruit ranking:
Note: In many cases, Scout, Rivals, 247Sports, On3, and ESPN may conflict in their listings of height and weight.; In these cases, the average was taken. ESPN grades are on a 100-point scale.; Sources:

*Originally class of 2025, but reclassified to 2024

== Preseason ==
Big 12 Preseason Poll

	Big 12 Coaches	Points
1.	Kansas	215 (9)
2.	Houston	211 (5)
3.	Iowa State	194 (1)
4.	Baylor	185
5.	Arizona	179 (1)
6.	Cincinnati	140
7.	Texas Tech	135
8.	Kansas State	133
9.	BYU	116
10.	TCU	90
11.	UCF	83
12.	Arizona State	64
13.	West Virginia	62
14.	Oklahoma State	46
15.	Colorado	37
16.	Utah	30
Reference: (#) first-place votes

Pre-Season All-Big 12 Team

First Team

Player	School
Caleb Love	Arizona
LJ Cryer	Houston
J’Wan Roberts	Houston
Tamin Lipsey	Iowa State
Hunter Dickinson†	Kansas
† denotes unanimous selection Reference:

Second Team

Player	School
Norchad Omier	Baylor
Jeremy Roach	Baylor
Keshon Gilbert	Iowa State
Dajuan Harris Jr	Kansas
Coleman Hawkins	Kansas State
† denotes unanimous selection Reference:

- Player of the Year: Hunter Dickinson, Kansas
- Co-Newcomer of the Year: Jeremy Roach, Baylor & Coleman Hawkins, Kansas State
- Freshman of the Year: V. J. Edgecombe, Baylor

== Roster ==
2024–25 Arizona State Sun Devils men's basketball team
Players
Coaches

Pos.	#	Name	Height	Weight	Year	Previous school	Hometown
F	0	Brandon Gardner	6 ft 8 in (2.03 m)	215 lb (98 kg)	RS Fr	USC	Waynesboro, Georgia
G	1	Alston Mason	6 ft 2 in (1.88 m)	170 lb (77 kg)	Sr	Missouri State	Phoenix, Arizona
G	2	Austin Nunez	6 ft 2 in (1.88 m)	170 lb (77 kg)	Jr	Ole Miss	Garden Ridge, Texas
G	3	Joson Sanon	6 ft 5 in (1.96 m)	200 lb (91 kg)	Fr	Vermont Academy	Saxtons River, Vermont
G/F	5	Amier Ali	6 ft 8 in (2.03 m)	190 lb (86 kg)	Fr	Canyon International Academy	Little Elm, Texas
F	6	Connor Braun (W)	6 ft 9 in (2.06 m)	225 lb (102 kg)	GS	Wheaton College (Illinois)	Tempe, Arizona
F	8	Basheer Jihad	6 ft 9 in (2.06 m)	240 lb (109 kg)	Sr	Ball State	Detroit, Michigan
C	9	Shawn Phillips	7 ft 0 in (2.13 m)	245 lb (111 kg)	Jr	LSU	Dayton, Ohio
G	11	Bobby Hurley Jr.	6 ft 0 in (1.83 m)	160 lb (73 kg)	Sr	Notre Dame Preparatory High School	Scottsdale, Arizona
F	21	Jayden Quaintance	6 ft 9 in (2.06 m)	225 lb (102 kg)	Fr	Word of God Christian Academy	Raleigh, North Carolina
G	22	Quentin McCoy (W)	6 ft 2 in (1.88 m)	170 lb (77 kg)	Fr	Robert Lindblom Math & Science Academy	Chicago, Illinois
G	25	Jordan Williams (W)	5 ft 10 in (1.78 m)	195 lb (88 kg)	Sr	AZ Compass Prep	Los Angeles, California
G	33	Brycen Long	6 ft 2 in (1.88 m)	180 lb (82 kg)	GS	Houston Christian	Gilbert, Arizona
G	44	Adam Miller	6 ft 3 in (1.91 m)	190 lb (86 kg)	RS Sr	LSU	Peoria, Illinois

Head coach

- Bobby Hurley (Duke)

Assistant coach(es)

- Jerrance Howard (Illinois)
- Nick Irvin (Shaw)
- Yusuf Ali (Laurentian)

Legend

- (C) Team captain
- (S) Suspended
- (I) Ineligible
- (W) Walk-on
- Injured
- Current redshirt

Roster

== Schedule and results ==
Date time, TV	Rank^{#}	Opponent^{#}	Result	Record	High points	High rebounds	High assists	Site (attendance) city, state
Exhibition
October 27, 2024*; 3:30 p.m., ACCN		at No. 7 Duke 'Brotherhood Run' Charity Exhibition	L 47–103	–	11 – Tied	6 – Quaintance	3 – Tied	Cameron Indoor Stadium (9,314); Durham, NC
Non-conference regular season
November 5, 2024*; 7:00 p.m., ESPN+		Idaho State	W 55–48	1–0	14 – Mason	8 – Tied	4 – Freeman	Desert Financial Arena (6,966); Tempe, AZ
November 8, 2024*; 6:30 p.m., FloSports		vs. Santa Clara; Las Vegas Hoopfest	W 81–74	2–0	16 – Miller	12 – Quaintance	3 – Tied	Lee's Family Forum (N/A); Henderson, NV
November 10, 2024*; 3:00 p.m., ESPN		at No. 6 Gonzaga	L 80–88	2–1	22 – Jihad	10 – Jihad	3 – Tied	McCarthey Athletic Center (6,000); Spokane, WA
November 14, 2024*; 7:00 p.m., ESPN2		vs. Grand Canyon; Jerry Colangelo Hall of Fame Series	W 87–76	3–1	21 – Sanon	5 – Tied	5 – Tied	Footprint Center (13,705); Phoenix, AZ
November 17, 2024*; 6:00 p.m., ESPN+		St. Thomas (MN)	W 81–66	4–1	20 – Jihad	14 – Quaintance	6 – Miller	Desert Financial Arena (6,057); Tempe, AZ
November 20, 2024*; 7:00 p.m., ESPN+		Cal Poly; Acrisure Classic campus site game	W 93–89	5–1	22 – Sanon	12 – Quaintance	5 – Tied	Desert Financial Arena (6,294); Tempe, AZ
November 28, 2024*; 9:30 p.m., TruTV		vs. New Mexico; Acrisure Classic semifinals	W 85–82	6–1	20 – Jihad	8 – Quaintance	5 – Mason	Acrisure Arena (732); Thousand Palms, CA
November 29, 2024*; 7:00 p.m., TruTV		vs. Saint Mary's; Acrisure Classic championship game	W 68–64	7–1	19 – Sanon	9 – Quaintance	5 – Quaintance	Acrisure Arena (2,310); Thousand Palms, CA
December 3, 2024*; 7:00 p.m., ESPN+		San Diego	W 90–53	8–1	19 – Tied	9 – Quaintance	4 – Miller	Desert Financial Arena (6,633); Tempe, AZ
December 14, 2024*; 1:30 p.m., SECN		vs. No. 9 Florida; Holiday Hoopsgiving	L 66–83	8–2	18 – Miller	8 – Quaintance	3 – Mason	State Farm Center; Atlanta, GA
December 21, 2024*; 2:00 p.m., CBSSN		vs. UMass; Basketball Hall of Fame Classic	W 78–62	9–2	20 – Jihad	11 – Quaintance	6 – Mason	MassMutual Center; Springfield, MA
Big 12 regular season
December 31, 2024; 2:00 p.m., ESPN2		at BYU	L 56–76	9–3 (0–1)	11 – Freeman	6 – Quaintance	3 – Tied	Marriott Center (16,926); Provo, UT
January 4, 2025; 4:00 p.m., ESPN+		Colorado	W 81–61	10–3 (1–1)	19 – Freeman	10 – Quaintance	4 – Freeman	Desert Financial Arena (7,998); Tempe, AZ
January 8, 2025; 7:00 p.m., ESPN2		at No. 11 Kansas	L 55–74	10–4 (1–2)	19 – Mason	10 – Quaintance	3 – Mason	Allen Fieldhouse (15,300); Lawrence, KS
January 11, 2025; 7:30 p.m., ESPN+		Baylor	L 66–72 ^{OT}	10–5 (1–3)	22 – Freeman	8 – Quaintance	5 – Mason	Desert Financial Arena (9,449); Tempe, AZ
January 14, 2025; 9:00 p.m., ESPNU		UCF	L 89–95	10–6 (1–4)	26 – Freeman	10 – Jihad	5 – Tied	Desert Financial Arena (8,337); Tempe, AZ
January 18, 2025; 12:00 p.m., CBSSN		at Cincinnati	L 60–67	10–7 (1–5)	15 – Quaintance	14 – Quaintance	5 – Jihad	Fifth Third Arena (11,090); Cincinnati, OH
January 21, 2025; 7:00 p.m., CBSSN		at No. 23 West Virginia	W 65–57	11–7 (2–5)	17 – Jihad	12 – Quaintance	4 – Mason	WVU Coliseum (10,528); Morgantown, WV
January 25, 2025; 12:00 p.m., ESPN+		No. 3 Iowa State	L 61–76	11–8 (2–6)	13 – Miller	6 – Tied	5 – Tied	Desert Financial Arena (12,762); Tempe, AZ
January 28, 2025; 7:00 p.m., ESPN+		at Colorado	W 70–68	12–8 (3–6)	18 – Miller	9 – Phillips	6 – Miller	CU Events Center (6,189); Boulder, CO
February 1, 2025; 11:00 a.m., CBS		Arizona; Rivalry	L 72–81	12–9 (3–7)	19 – Freeman	8 – Quaintance	7 – Mason	Desert Financial Arena (13,544); Tempe, AZ
February 4, 2025; 8:00 p.m., ESPN+		Kansas State	L 70–71	12–10 (3–8)	20 – Mason	10 – Quaintance	6 – Mason	Desert Financial Arena (6,868); Tempe, AZ
February 9, 2025; 12:00 p.m., ESPN+		at Oklahoma State	L 73–86	12–11 (3–9)	25 – Mason	10 – Ali	3 – Jihad	Gallagher-Iba Arena (5,639); Stillwater, OK
February 12, 2025; 7:00 p.m., ESPN+		at No. 12 Texas Tech	L 106–111 ^{2OT}	12–12 (3–10)	22 – Miller	7 – Ali	6 – Mason	United Supermarkets Arena (13,290); Lubbock, TX
February 15, 2025; 6:00 p.m., ESPN+		TCU	L 70–74	12–13 (3–11)	21 – Freeman	8 – Phillips	9 – Mason	Desert Financial Arena (9,026); Tempe, AZ
February 18, 2025; 7:00 p.m., ESPN2		No. 5 Houston	L 65–80	12–14 (3–12)	26 – Mason	6 – Ali	4 – Ali	Desert Financial Arena (8,315); Tempe, AZ
February 23, 2025; 2:00 p.m., ESPN+		at Kansas State	W 66–54	13–14 (4–12)	18 – Quaintance	11 – Phillips	8 – Mason	Bramlage Coliseum (9,121); Manhattan, KS
February 26, 2025; 7:30 p.m., ESPN+		No. 25 BYU	L 81–91	13–15 (4–13)	19 – Jihad	9 – Phillips	3 – Sanon	Desert Financial Arena (9,383); Tempe, AZ
March 1, 2025; 5:00 p.m., ESPN+		at Utah	L 73–99	13–16 (4–14)	28 – Sanon	6 – Ali	4 – Mason	Jon M. Huntsman Center (8,780); Salt Lake City, UT
March 4, 2025; 9:00 p.m., ESPN		at No. 24 Arizona; Rivalry	L 100–113	13–17 (4–15)	33 – Mason	7 – Jihad	6 – Mason	McKale Center (14,267); Tucson, AZ
March 8, 2025; 6:00 p.m., ESPNU		No. 9 Texas Tech	L 57–85	13–18 (4–16)	22 – Jihad	6 – Tied	4 – Mason	Desert Financial Arena (8,895); Tempe, AZ
Big 12 tournament
March 11, 2025; 4:00 p.m., ESPN+	(15)	vs. (10) Kansas State; First Round	L 66–71	13–19	17 – Mason	14 – Phillips	3 – Tied	T-Mobile Center (12,929); Kansas City, MO
College Basketball Crown
March 31, 2025*; 5:30 p.m., FS1		vs. Nebraska; First round	L 78–86	13–20	23 – Mason	7 – Jihad	4 – Mason	MGM Grand Garden Arena; Paradise, NV
*Non-conference game. ^{#}Rankings from AP poll. (#) Tournament seedings in parentheses. All times are in Mountain Time.

== Rankings ==
Ranking movements Legend: ██ Increase in ranking ██ Decrease in ranking — = Not ranked RV = Received votes
	Week																				
Poll	Pre	1	2	3	4	5	6	7	8	9	10	11	12	13	14	15	16	17	18	19	Final
AP	RV	RV	RV	RV	RV	RV	RV	RV	RV	—	—	—	—	—	—	—	—	—	—	—	—
Coaches	—	—	—	—	RV	RV	—	—	—	—	—	—	—	—	—	—	—	—	—	—	—
