= 2024–25 Big 12 Conference men's basketball season =

- League: NCAA Division I
- Sport: Basketball
- Teams: 16
- Total attendance: 2,720,565
- TV partner(s): ESPN, ESPN2, ESPNU, ESPN+, CBS

Regular season
- Regular season champion: Houston (2nd title)
- Season MVP: JT Toppin, Texas Tech
- Top scorer: Javon Small, West Virginia; Keyshawn Hall, UCF

Big 12 tournament
- Venue: T-Mobile Center, Kansas City, Missouri
- Champions: Houston (1st title)
- Tournament MVP: Emanuel Sharp, Houston

Big 12 men's basketball seasons
- ← 2023–24 2025–26 →

2024–25 Big 12 men's basketball standings
	Conf.				Overall
Team	W		L	PCT	W		L	PCT
No. 2 Houston †	19	–	1	.950	35	–	5	.875
No. 8 Texas Tech	15	–	5	.750	28	–	9	.757
No. 15 Arizona	14	–	6	.700	24	–	13	.649
No. 13 BYU	14	–	6	.700	26	–	10	.722
No. 17 Iowa State	13	–	7	.650	25	–	10	.714
Kansas	11	–	9	.550	21	–	13	.618
Baylor	10	–	10	.500	20	–	15	.571
West Virginia	10	–	10	.500	19	–	13	.594
TCU	9	–	11	.450	16	–	16	.500
Kansas State	9	–	11	.450	16	–	17	.485
Utah	8	–	12	.400	16	–	17	.485
Oklahoma State	7	–	13	.350	17	–	18	.486
Cincinnati	7	–	13	.350	19	–	16	.543
UCF	7	–	13	.350	20	–	17	.541
Arizona State	4	–	16	.200	13	–	20	.394
Colorado	3	–	17	.150	14	–	21	.400
† 2025 Big 12 tournament winner Rankings from AP poll

The 2024–25 Big 12 men's basketball season began with the start of the 2024–25 NCAA Division I men's basketball season in November. Regular season conference play will begin in December 2024 and conclude in March 2025. The 2025 Big 12 men's basketball tournament was held March 11–15, 2025, at the T-Mobile Center in Kansas City, Missouri.

This was the first season for the Big 12 Conference with 16 teams after the addition of Arizona, Arizona State, Colorado and Utah, plus the departure of Oklahoma and Texas.

== Coaches ==
=== Coaching changes ===
Coach	School	Reason	Replacement
Mike Boynton	Oklahoma State	Fired	Steve Lutz
Josh Eilert	West Virginia	Fired	Darian DeVries
Mark Pope	BYU	Left for Kentucky	Kevin Young
Craig Smith	Utah	Fired	Josh Eilert
Darian DeVries	West Virginia	Left for Indiana	Ross Hodge

=== Head coaches ===
Note: Stats are through the beginning of the season. All stats and records are from time at current school only.

Team	Head coach	Previous job	Seasons at school as HC	Overall record at School	Big 12 record	NCAA tournaments	NCAA Final Fours	NCAA championships
Arizona	Tommy Lloyd	Gonzaga (asst.)	4th	88–20 (.815)	0–0 (–)	3	0	0
Arizona State	Bobby Hurley	Buffalo	9th	155–131 (.542)	0–0 (–)	3	0	0
Baylor	Scott Drew	Valparaiso	22nd	446–244 (.646)	189–173 (.522)	12	1	1
BYU	Kevin Young	Phoenix Suns (asst.)	1st	0–0 (–)	0–0 (–)	0	0	0
UCF	Johnny Dawkins	Stanford	9th	148–103 (.590)	7–11 (.389)	1	0	0
Cincinnati	Wes Miller	UNC Greensboro	4th	63–43 (.594)	7–11 (.389)	0	0	0
Colorado	Tad Boyle	Northern Colorado	15th	298–183 (.620)	8–8 (.500)	6	0	0
Houston	Kelvin Sampson	Houston Rockets (asst.)	11th	264–79 (.770)	15–3 (.833)	6	1	0
Iowa State	T. J. Otzelberger	UNLV	4th	70–35 (.667)	29–25 (.537)	3	0	0
Kansas	Bill Self	Illinois	22nd	579–138 (.808)	272–72 (.791)	19†	3†	2
Kansas State	Jerome Tang	Baylor (asst.)	3rd	45–25 (.643)	19–17 (.528)	1	0	0
Oklahoma State	Steve Lutz	Western Kentucky	1st	0–0 (–)	0–0 (–)	0	0	0
TCU	Jamie Dixon	Pittsburgh	9th	160–110 (.593)	60–81 (.426)	4	0	0
Texas Tech	Grant McCasland	North Texas	2nd	23–11 (.676)	11–7 (.611)	1	0	0
Utah	Craig Smith‡	Utah State	4th	50–50 (.500)	0–0 (–)	0	0	0
West Virginia	Darian DeVries#	Drake	1st	0–0 (–)	0–0 (–)	0	0	0

† All of the Jayhawks' postseason victories and 7 of their regular-season wins were vacated from the 2017–18 season. Officially, their record for the season 16–8 overall and 3–5 in conference play. The Jayhawks' regular-season Big 12 championship and their Big 12 tournament championship were vacated. The Jayhawks' entire NCAA tournament appearance from the season was vacated including their Final Four appearance.

‡ Craig Smith was fired on February 24, 2025 after 27 games into the 2024−25 season. He finished with a record of 65−62 and zero NCAA tournament appearances. Assistant coach Josh Eilert was named interim head coach for the remainder of the season.

# Darian DeVries took the Indiana job on March 18, 2025 after their season was over. He finished with a record of 19–13 and zero NCAA tournament appearances.

=== Big 12 media day ===
Big 12 Men's Basketball Media day was held on Wednesday, October 23 at T-Mobile Center in Kansas City, Missouri, with coverage on ESPNU and ESPN+.

Teams and representatives attending were as follows:

Team	Coach	Player
Arizona	Tommy Lloyd	Jaden Bradley, KJ Lewis & Caleb Love
Arizona State	Bobby Hurley	Basheer Jihad, Alston Mason & Adam Miller
Baylor	Scott Drew	V.J. Edgecombe, Langston Love & Jayden Nunn
BYU	Kevin Young	Dallin Hall, Fousseyni Traore & Trevin Knell
UCF	Johnny Dawkins	Jordan Ivy-Curry, Darius Johnson, Keyshawn Hall
Cincinnati	Wes Miller	Aziz Bandaogo, Simas Lukosius
Colorado	Tad Boyle	Julian Hammond III, Andrej Jakimovski & Javon Ruffin
Houston	Kelvin Sampson	LJ Cryer, J’Wan Roberts & Emanuel Sharp
Iowa State	T. J. Otzelberger	Keshon Gilbert, Curtis Jones & Tamin Lipsey
Kansas	Bill Self	KJ Adams Jr., Hunter Dickinson & Dajuan Harris Jr.
Kansas State	Jerome Tang	Coleman Hawkins, Max Jones & David N'Guessan
Oklahoma State	Steve Lutz	Robert Jennings II, Jamyron Keller & Bryce Thompson
TCU	Jamie Dixon	Frankie Collins, Noah Reynolds & Ernest Udeh Jr.
Texas Tech	Grant McCasland	Chance McMillian, Kerwin Walton & Darrion Williams
Utah	Craig Smith	Lawson Lovering & Gabe Madsen
West Virginia	Darian DeVries	Tucker DeVries & Javon Small

== Preseason ==
The Big 12 preseason coaches poll was released: October 10, 2024. All awards were voted on by the league's 16 head coaches, who could not vote for their own team or players.

Big 12 Preseason Poll

	Big 12 Coaches	Points
1.	Kansas	215 (9)
2.	Houston	211 (5)
3.	Iowa State	194 (1)
4.	Baylor	185
5.	Arizona	179 (1)
6.	Cincinnati	140
7.	Texas Tech	135
8.	Kansas State	133
9.	BYU	116
10.	TCU	90
11.	UCF	83
12.	Arizona State	64
13.	West Virginia	62
14.	Oklahoma State	46
15.	Colorado	37
16.	Utah	30
Reference: (#) first-place votes

Pre-Season All-Big 12 Team

First Team

Player	School
Caleb Love	Arizona
LJ Cryer	Houston
J’Wan Roberts	Houston
Tamin Lipsey	Iowa State
Hunter Dickinson†	Kansas
† denotes unanimous selection Reference:

Second Team

Player	School
Norchad Omier	Baylor
Jeremy Roach	Baylor
Keshon Gilbert	Iowa State
Dajuan Harris Jr.	Kansas
Coleman Hawkins	Kansas State
† denotes unanimous selection Reference:

- Player of the Year: Hunter Dickinson, Kansas
- Co-Newcomer of the Year: Jeremy Roach, Baylor & Coleman Hawkins, Kansas State
- Freshman of the Year: V. J. Edgecombe, Baylor

=== Recruiting classes ===
Rankings
Team	ESPN	Rivals	247 Sports	On3	Signees
Arizona		32	34	26	2
Arizona State		8	9	7	3
Baylor		4	6	4	3
BYU		–	13	22	6
UCF		24	92	65	3
Cincinnati		31	37	21	2
Colorado		42	29	40	3
Houston		28	41	17	2
Iowa State		55	54	38	2
Kansas		17	31	9	2
Kansas State		59	91	66	2
Oklahoma State		–	–	–	0
TCU		57	18	37	2
Texas Tech		63	99	83	2
Utah		62	43	59	2
West Virginia		78	83	87	2

=== Preseason watchlists ===
Below is a table of notable preseason watch lists.

Player	Wooden	Naismith	Olson	Cousy	West	Erving	Malone	Abdul-Jabbar
KJ Adams Jr.	✓							
LJ Cryer	✓	✓	✓		✓			
Tucker DeVries	✓	✓				✓		
Hunter Dickinson	✓	✓	✓					✓
V. J. Edgecombe	✓	✓	✓		✓			
BJ Freeman						✓		
Dajuan Harris Jr.	✓	✓	✓	✓				
Coleman Hawkins	✓	✓	✓				✓	
Elijah Hawkins				✓				
Motiejus Krivas								✓
KJ Lewis						✓		
Tamin Lipsey	✓	✓	✓	✓				
Caleb Love	✓	✓	✓		✓			
Zeke Mayo			✓		✓			
Milan Momcilovic						✓		
Norchad Omier	✓	✓	✓				✓	
Jayden Quaintance								✓
Jeremy Roach	✓	✓	✓	✓				
J'Wan Roberts	✓	✓					✓	
AJ Storr	✓	✓				✓		
JT Toppin			✓				✓	
Trey Townsend							✓	

=== Preseason All-American teams ===
	AP	Blue Ribbon 1st Team	Blue Ribbon 3rd Team	Blue Ribbon 4th Team	SI 1st Team	SI 2nd Team	SN 2nd Team	SN 3rd Team
LJ Cryer				✓				
Hunter Dickinson	✓	✓			✓		✓	
V. J. Edgecombe								✓
Caleb Love	✓	✓				✓		✓
Tamin Lipsey			✓			✓	✓	
J'Wan Roberts			✓					

=== Preseason national polls/ratings ===
	AP	Blue Ribbon; Yearbook	CBS Sports	Coaches	ESPN	FOX Sports	Lindy's; Sports	Sporting News	Kenpom	NCAA Sports	Sports; Illustrated
Arizona	No. 10	No. 13	No. 14	No. 9	No. 9	No. 9	No. 10	No. 18	No. 8	No. 17	No. 11
Arizona State	RV	–	No. 100	–	–	–	–	–	No. 71	–	No. 72
Baylor	No. 8	No. 8	No. 6	No. 8	No. 6	No. 8	No. 9	No. 5	No. 11	No. 8	No. 9
BYU	RV	–	No. 66	RV	–	–	–	–	No. 21	–	No. 39
UCF	–	–	No. 61	–	–	–	–	–	No. 66	–	No. 83
Cincinnati	No. 20	No. 21	No. 30	No. 20	No. 19	No. 19	–	–	No. 17	No. 23	No. 17
Colorado	–	–	No. 98	–	–	–	–	–	No. 80	–	No. 128
Houston	No. 4	No. 7	No. 2	No. 4	No. 4	No. 4	No. 4	No. 12	No. 1	No. 6	No. 2
Iowa State	No. 5	No. 5	No. 21	No. 6	No. 7	No. 6	No. 6	No. 2	No. 7	No. 7	No. 6
Kansas	No. 1	No. 2	No. 3	No. 1	No. 1	No. 1	No. 2	No. 19	No. 6	No. 2	No. 3
Kansas State	RV	–	No. 24	RV	No. 27	–	–	–	No. 49	No. 28	–
Oklahoma State	–	–	No. 97	–	–	–	–	–	No. 89	–	No. 98
TCU	–	–	No. 79	–	–	–	–	–	No. 58	–	No. 42
Texas Tech	RV	–	No. 31	RV	No. 26	No. 23	–	–	No. 15	–	No. 15
Utah	–	–	No. 71	–	–	–	–	–	No. 82	–	No. 125
West Virginia	–	–	–	–	–	–	–	–	No. 87	–	No. 56

== Regular season ==
The Conference match ups for each school were announced on June 27, 2024. The full Big 12 schedule on September 26, 2024.

Key
Schedule	Home & Away Conference Schedule
	Home (H) & Away (A)
	Home Only (H)
	Away Only (A)

	Arizona	Arizona State	Baylor	BYU	UCF	Cincinnati	Colorado	Houston	Iowa State	Kansas	Kansas State	Oklahoma State	TCU	Texas Tech	Utah	West Virginia
vs. Arizona	—	H & A	H & A	H & A	A	H	A	A	H & A	H	H	H	A	H & A	A	H
vs. Arizona State	H & A	—	A	H & A	A	H	H & A	A	A	H	H & A	H	A	H & A	H	H
vs. Baylor	H & A	H	—	H	A	H & A	H	H & A	H	A	A	A	H & A	H	H & A	A
vs. BYU	H & A	H & A	A	—	H	H & A	H	H	H	A	A	A	H	A	H & A	H & A
vs. UCF	H	H	H	A	—	A	H & A	A	H & A	H & A	A	H & A	H & A	H	A	H
vs. Cincinnati	A	A	H & A	H & A	H	—	H	H	H	A	H & A	H	A	A	H & A	H & A
vs. Colorado	H	H & A	A	A	H & A	A	—	A	H & A	H & A	H	H	H & A	H	H	A
vs. Houston	H	H	H & A	A	H	A	H	—	A	H & A	H	H & A	A	H & A	A	H & A
vs. Iowa State	H & A	H	A	A	H & A	A	H & A	H	—	H & A	H & A	H	A	H	A	H
vs. Kansas	A	A	H	H	H & A	H	H & A	H & A	H & A	—	H & A	A	H	A	H	A
vs. Kansas State	A	H & A	H	H	H	H & A	A	A	H & A	H & A	—	H & A	H	A	H	A
vs. Oklahoma State	A	A	H	H	H & A	A	A	H & A	A	H	H & A	—	H	H & A	H & A	H
vs. TCU	H	H	H & A	A	H & A	H	H & A	H	H	A	A	A	—	H & A	A	H & A
vs. Texas Tech	H & A	H & A	A	H	A	H	A	H & A	A	H	H	H & A	H & A	—	H	A
vs. Utah	H	A	H & A	H & A	H	H & A	A	H	H	A	A	H & A	H	A	—	H & A
vs. West Virginia	A	A	H	H & A	A	H & A	H	H & A	A	H	H	A	H & A	H	H & A	—

=== Conference matrix ===
	Arizona	Arizona State	Baylor	BYU	UCF	Cincinnati	Colorado	Houston	Iowa State	Kansas	Kansas State	Oklahoma State	TCU	Texas Tech	Utah	West Virginia
vs. Arizona	—	0–2	0–2	1–1	0–1	0–1	0–1	1–0	1–1	1–0	1–0	0–1	0–1	1–1	0–1	0–1
vs. Arizona State	2–0	—	1–0	2–0	1–0	1–0	0–2	1–0	1–0	1–0	1–1	1–0	1–0	2–0	1–0	0–1
vs. Baylor	2–0	0–1	—	1–0	0–1	1–1	1–0	2–0	1–0	0–1	0–1	0–1	1–1	1–0	0–2	0–1
vs. BYU	1–1	0–2	0–1	—	0–1	1–1	0–1	1–0	0–1	0–1	0–1	0–1	1–0	1–0	1–1	0–2
vs. UCF	1–0	0–1	1–0	1–0	—	1–0	1–1	1–0	2–0	2–0	0–1	1–1	1–1	0–1	0–1	1–0
vs. Cincinnati	1–0	0–1	1–1	1–1	0–1	—	0–1	1–0	1–0	1–0	2–0	1–0	0–1	1–0	1–1	2–0
vs. Colorado	1–0	2–0	0–1	1–0	1–1	1–0	—	1–0	2–0	2–0	1–0	1–0	1–1	1–0	1–0	1–0
vs. Houston	0–1	0–1	0–2	0–1	0–1	0–1	0–1	—	0–1	0–2	0–1	0–2	0–1	1–1	0–1	0–2
vs. Iowa State	1–1	0–1	0–1	1–0	0–2	0–1	0–2	1–0	—	1–1	1–1	1–0	0–1	0–1	0–1	1–0
vs. Kansas	0–1	0–1	1–0	1–0	0–2	0–1	0–2	2–0	1–1	—	1–1	0–1	0–1	1–0	1–0	1–0
vs. Kansas State	0–1	1–1	1–0	1–0	1–0	0–2	0–1	1–0	1–1	1–1	—	1–1	1–0	1–0	1–0	0–1
vs. Oklahoma State	1–0	0–1	1–0	1–0	1–1	0–1	0–1	2–0	0–1	1–0	1–1	—	1–0	2–0	1–1	1–0
vs. TCU	1–0	0–1	1–1	0–1	1–1	1–0	1–1	1–0	1–0	1–0	0–1	0–1	—	1–1	1–0	1–1
vs. Texas Tech	1–1	0–2	0–1	0–1	1–0	0–1	0–1	1–1	1–0	0–1	0–1	0–2	1–1	—	0–1	0–1
vs. Utah	1–0	0–1	2–0	1–1	1–0	1–1	0–1	1–0	1–0	0–1	0–1	1–1	0–1	1–0	—	2–0
vs. West Virginia	1–0	1–0	1–0	2–0	0–1	0–2	0–1	2–0	0–1	0–1	1–0	0–1	1–1	1–0	0–2	—
Total	14–6	4–16	10–10	14–6	7–13	7–13	3–17	19–1	13–7	11–9	9–11	7–13	9–11	15–5	8–12	10–10

Thru 2024−25 Regular Season.

=== Points scored ===
Team	For	Against	Difference
Arizona	3,052	2,711	341
Arizona State	2,444	2,533	-89
Baylor	2,664	2,443	221
BYU	2,931	2,612	319
UCF	2,951	2,974	-23
Cincinnati	2,491	2,318	173
Colorado	2,441	2,515	-74
Houston	2,946	2,346	600
Iowa State	2,812	2,392	420
Kansas	2,587	2,365	222
Kansas State	2,337	2,297	40
Oklahoma State	2,556	2,671	-115
TCU	2,162	2,199	-37
Texas Tech	2,993	2,553	460
Utah	2,493	2,396	97
West Virginia	2,181	2,074	107

Note: Through 2025 season.

=== Big East-Big 12 Battle ===
Date	Time	Big East team	Big 12 team	Score	Location	Television	Attendance	Leader
Tue., Dec. 3	6:30 p.m.	Villanova	No. 14 Cincinnati	68–60	Finneran Pavilion • Villanova, PA	FS1	6,501	Big East (1–0)
Tue., Dec. 3	8:30 p.m.	Providence	BYU	83–64	Amica Mutual Pavilion • Providence, RI	FS1	12,005	Big East (2–0)
Wed., Dec. 4	6:30 p.m.	No. 25 UConn	No. 15 Baylor	76–72	Gampel Pavilion • Storrs, CT	FS1	10,299	Big East (3–0)
Wed., Dec. 4	7:00 p.m.	No. 5 Marquette	No. 6 Iowa State	81–70	Hilton Coliseum • Ames, IA	ESPN+	14,267	Big East (3–1)
Wed., Dec. 4	8:30 p.m.	Creighton	No. 1 Kansas	76–63	CHI Health Center Omaha • Omaha, NE	FS1	17,908	Big East (4–1)
Wed., Dec. 4	9:00 p.m.	DePaul	Texas Tech	76–62	United Supermarkets Arena • Lubbock, TX	ESPNU	11,465	Big East (4–2)
Thur., Dec. 5	8:00 p.m.	Xavier	TCU	72–76	Schollmaier Arena • Fort Worth, TX	ESPN+	5,156	Big East (4–3)
Fri., Dec. 6	7:00 p.m.	Georgetown	West Virginia	60–73	WVU Coliseum • Morgantown, WV	ESPN2	11,522	Tied (4–4)
Sat., Dec. 7	11:30 a.m.	St. John's	Kansas State	88–71	Carnesecca Arena • Jamaica, NY	Fox	5,602	Big East (5–4)
Sat., Dec. 7	5:30 p.m.	Butler	No. 17 Houston	51–79	Fertitta Center • Houston, TX	ESPN2	7,035	Tied (5–5)
Sun., Dec. 8	12:00 p.m.	Seton Hall	Oklahoma State	76–85	Prudential Center • Newark, NJ	FS1	8,791	Big 12 (6–5)
WINNERS ARE IN BOLD. HOME TEAM IN ITALICS. All times Eastern. Rankings from AP Poll released prior to the game. Not participating: Arizona, Arizona State, Colorado, UCF and Utah

=== Multi-Team Events ===
Team	Tournament	Finish
Arizona	Battle 4 Atlantis	4th
Arizona State	Acrisure Classic	1st
Baylor	Bahamas Championship	2nd
BYU	Rady Children's Invitational	3rd
UCF	Greenbrier Tip-Off	4th
Colorado	Maui Invitational	6th
Houston	Players Era Festival	4th
Iowa State	Maui Invitational	5th
Kansas State	Paradise Jam	3rd
Oklahoma State	Charleston Classic	6th
TCU	Acrisure Invitational	4th
Texas Tech	Legends Classic	3rd
West Virginia	Battle 4 Atlantis	3rd

=== Big 12 Players of the Week ===
Week	Player of the week	Team	Newcomer of the week	Team
November 11, 2024	Hunter Dickinson	Kansas	Egor Dëmin; Zeke Mayo	BYU; Kansas
November 18, 2024	Hunter Dickinson (2)	Kansas	Egor Dëmin (2); Joson Sanon	BYU; Arizona State
November 25, 2024	Norchad Omier	Baylor	JT Toppin	Texas Tech
December 2, 2024	Keshon Gilbert; Javon Small	Iowa State; West Virginia	Tucker DeVries	West Virginia
December 9, 2024	Keshon Gilbert (2)	Iowa State	Joshua Jefferson	Iowa State
December 16, 2024	Hunter Dickinson (3)	Kansas	Joshua Jefferson (2); Zeke Mayo (2)	Iowa State; Kansas
December 23, 2024	Darrion Williams	Texas Tech	Jayden Quaintance	Arizona State
January 6, 2025	Javon Small (2)	West Virginia	Joshua Jefferson (3); Noah Reynolds	Iowa State; TCU
January 13, 2025	Curtis Jones	Iowa State	Joshua Jefferson (4)	Iowa State
January 20, 2025	Javon Small (3)	West Virginia	Keyshawn Hall	UCF
January 27, 2025	Milos Uzan	Houston	V. J. Edgecombe; Joshua Jefferson (5)	Baylor; Iowa State
February 3, 2025	Caleb Love	Arizona	Robert Wright III	Baylor
February 10, 2025	David N'Guessan	Kansas State	Tobe Awaka	Arizona
February 17, 2025	JT Toppin	Texas Tech	JT Toppin (2)	Texas Tech
February 24, 2025	Richie Saunders	BYU	JT Toppin (3)	Texas Tech
March 3, 2025	Richie Saunders (2)	BYU	Abou Ousman	Oklahoma State
March 10, 2025	JT Toppin (2)	Texas Tech	JT Toppin (4)	Texas Tech

=== Team Total ===
Team	Total
Iowa State	8
Kansas	5
Texas Tech	7
BYU	4
West Virginia	4
Baylor	3
Arizona	2
Arizona State	2
Houston	1
Kansas State	1
TCU	1
UCF	1
Oklahoma State	1
Cincinnati	0
Colorado	0
Utah	0

=== Midseason watchlists ===
Below is a table of notable Midseason watch lists.

Player	Wooden	Naismith	Cousy	West	Malone	Abdul-Jabbar	Robertson
Hunter Dickinson	✓					✓	✓
V. J. Edgecombe				✓			
Keshon Gilbert	✓		✓				✓
Curtis Jones				✓			✓
Caleb Love				✓			✓
Norchad Omier					✓		✓
Emanuel Sharp							✓
Javon Small			✓				✓
JT Toppin					✓		
Darrion Williams							✓

Coaching Midseason watch lists.

Player	Naismith
Grant McCasland	✓
Kelvin Sampson	✓

=== Final watchlists ===
Below is a table of notable Midseason watch lists.

Player	Wooden	Naismith	Naismith DPOY	West	Malone	Robertson
V. J. Edgecombe				✓		
Tamin Lipsey			✓			
Caleb Love				✓		
JT Toppin					✓	
Joseph Tugler			✓			

== Rankings ==
Legend
	Increase in ranking
	Decrease in ranking
	Not ranked previous week
т	Tied with another team in rankings

		Pre	Wk 1	Wk 2	Wk 3	Wk 4	Wk 5	Wk 6	Wk 7	Wk 8	Wk 9	Wk 10	Wk 11	Wk 12	Wk 13	Wk 14	Wk 15	Wk 16	Wk 17	Wk 18	Wk 19	Final
Arizona	AP	10	9	17	24						RV	RV	RV	RV	20	13	19	22	24	RV	21	15
Arizona	C	9	8	17	23	RV					RV	RV	RV	RV	20	13	18	21	23	24	20	13
Arizona State	AP	RV	RV	RV	RV	RV	RV	RV	RV	RV												
Arizona State	C					RV	RV															
Baylor	AP	8	12	13	17	15	RV	RV	25	25	RV	25	RV	RV	RV							
Baylor	C	8	14	15	18	16	25	RV	23	21	RV	24	RV	RV	RV						RV	RV
BYU	AP	RV	RV	RV	RV	RV												25	23	17	17	13
BYU	C	RV		RV	RV	RV									RV			RV	22	18	17	15
UCF	AP		RV																			
UCF	C		RV																			
Cincinnati	AP	20	17	18	16	14	22	19	17	16	RV		RV									
Cincinnati	C	20	17	16	14	14	23	20	17	17	RV											
Colorado	AP																					
Colorado	C																					
Houston	AP	4	8	7	6	17	15	15	15	14	12	10	7	6	5	6	5	4	3	2	2	2
Houston	C	4	10	7т	7	18	13	12	12	14	11	9	5	5	5	6	5	4	3	2	2	2
Iowa State	AP	5	7	5	5	6	3	3	3	3	3	2	3	3	8	10	8	9	10	12	15	17
Iowa State	C	6	7	5	5	5	3	3	3	3	3	2	4	3	8	10	8	9	10	12	14	17
Kansas	AP	1	1	1	1	1	10	8	7	7	11	9	12	11	16	17	23	RV	RV	RV	RV	RV
Kansas	C	1	1	1	1	1	10	8	7	7	12	10	11	11	17	20	25	RV	RV	RV	RV	RV
Kansas State	AP	RV	RV	RV																		
Kansas State	C	RV	RV																			
Oklahoma State	AP	RV						RV														
Oklahoma State	C																					
TCU	AP																					
TCU	C																					
Texas Tech	AP	RV	RV	RV	RV	RV	RV		RV	RV	RV	RV	RV	22	13	12	9	10	9	9	9	8
Texas Tech	C	RV	RV	22	RV	RV	RV	RV		RV	RV	RV	25	19	12	12	10	10	9	9	9	8
Utah	AP																					
Utah	C																					
West Virginia	AP					RV	RV	RV	RV	RV	21	RV	23	RV	RV							
West Virginia	C					RV	RV	RV	RV	RV	23	25	23	RV								

== Big 12 vs other conferences ==
=== Record against ranked non-conference opponents ===
This is a list of games against ranked opponents only (rankings from the AP Poll at time of the game):

Date	Visitor	Home	Site	Significance	Score	Conference record
Nov. 4	No. 13 Texas A&M	UCF	Addition Financial Arena ● Orlando, FL	−	UCF 64−61	1−0
Nov. 4	No. 8 Baylor	No. 6 Gonzaga	Spokane Arena ● Spokane, WA	−	Gonzaga 101−63	1−1
Nov. 8	No. 9 North Carolina	No. 1 Kansas	Allen Fieldhouse ● Lawrence, KS	−	Kansas 92−89	2−1
Nov. 9	No. 16 Arkansas	No. 8 Baylor †	American Airlines Center ● Dallas, Texas	−	Baylor 72−67	3−1
Nov. 9	No. 11 Auburn	No. 4 Houston	Toyota Center ● Houston, TX	The Battleground 2k24	Auburn 74−69	3−2
Nov. 10	Arizona State	No. 6 Gonzaga	McCarthey Athletic Center ● Spokane, WA	−	Gonzaga 88−80	3−3
Nov. 21	No. 22 St. John's	No. 13 Baylor †	Baha Mar Convention Center ● Nassau, Bahamas	Bahamas Championship	Baylor 99−98 ^{2OT}	4−3
Nov. 22	No. 19 Wisconsin	UCF†	Colonial Hall ● White Sulphur Springs, WV	Greenbrier Tip-Off	Wisconsin 86−70	4−4
Nov. 22	No. 11 Tennessee	No. 13 Baylor †	Baha Mar Convention Center ● Nassau, Bahamas	Bahamas Championship	Tennessee 77−62	4−5
Nov. 22	No. 12 Duke	No. 17 Arizona	McKale Center ● Tucson, AZ	−	Duke 69−55	4−6
Nov. 22	No. 4 Auburn	No. 5 Iowa State†	Lahaina Civic Center ● Lahaina, HI	Maui Invitational	Auburn 83−81	4−7
Nov. 26	No. 2 UConn	Colorado†	Lahaina Civic Center ● Lahaina, HI	Maui Invitational	Colorado 73−72	5−7
Nov. 26	No. 9 Alabama	No. 6 Houston†	MGM Grand Garden Arena ● Paradise, NV	Players Era Festival	Alabama 85−80	5−8
Nov. 26	No. 11 Duke	No. 1 Kansas†	T-Mobile Arena ● Paradise, NV	Vegas Showdown	Kansas 75−72	6−8
Nov. 27	No. 3 Gonzaga	West Virginia†	Imperial Arena ● Nassau, Bahamas	Battle 4 Atlantis	West Virginia 86−78 ^{OT}	7−8
Nov. 28	No. 23 Ole Miss	BYU†	LionTree Arena ● San Diego, CA	Rady Children's Invitational	Ole Miss 96−85 ^{OT}	7−9
Dec. 4	No. 15 Baylor	No. 25 UConn	Harry A. Gampel Pavilion ● Storrs, CT	Big East–Big 12 Battle	UConn 76−72	7−10
Dec. 4	No. 5 Marquette	No. 6 Iowa State	Hilton Coliseum ● Ames, IA	Big East–Big 12 Battle	Iowa State 81−70	8−10
Dec. 8	No. 22 Texas A&M	Texas Tech†	Dickies Arena ● Fort Worth, TX	Coast-to-Coast Challenge	Texas A&M 72−67	8−11
Dec. 14	No. 24 UCLA	Arizona†	Footprint Center ● Phoenix, AZ	Rivalry	UCLA 57−54	8−12
Dec. 14	No. 9 Florida	Arizona State†	State Farm Center ● Atlanta, GA	Holiday Hoopsgiving	Florida 83−66	8−13
Dec. 14	No. 13 Oklahoma	Oklahoma State†	Paycom Center ● Oklahoma City, OK	Bedlam Series	Oklahoma 80−65	8−14
Dec. 20	No. 22 Dayton	No. 19 Cincinnati†	Heritage Bank Center ● Cincinnati, OH	Simple Truth Hoops Classic	Cincinnati 66−59	9−14
Mar. 22	No. 10 Wisconsin	No. 17 BYU †	Ball Arena ● Denver, CO	NCAA tournament	BYU 91−89	10−14
Mar. 22	No. 24 Gonzaga	No. 2 Houston †	Intrust Bank Arena ● Wichita, KS	NCAA tournament	Houston 81−76	11−14
Mar. 23	No. 1 Duke	Baylor †	Lenovo Center ● Raleigh, NC	NCAA tournament	Duke 89−66	11−15
Mar. 23	No. 25 Oregon	No. 21 Arizona †	Climate Pledge Arena ● Seattle, WA	NCAA tournament	Arizona 87−83	12−15
Mar. 27	No. 7 Alabama	No. 17 BYU †	Prudential Center ● Newark, NJ	NCAA tournament	Alabama 113−88	12−16
Mar. 27	No. 1 Duke	No. 21 Arizona †	Prudential Center ● Newark, NJ	NCAA tournament	Duke 100−93	12−17
Mar. 28	No. 22 Purdue	No. 2 Houston †	Lucas Oil Stadium ● Indianapolis, IN	NCAA tournament	Houston 62−60	13−17
Mar. 29	No. 3 Florida	No. 9 Texas Tech †	Chase Center ● San Francisco, CA	NCAA tournament	Florida 84−79	13−18
Mar. 30	No. 6 Tennessee	No. 2 Houston †	Lucas Oil Stadium ● Indianapolis, IN	NCAA tournament	Houston 69−50	14−18
April 5	No. 1 Duke	No. 2 Houston †	Alamodome ● San Antonio, TX	NCAA tournament	Houston 70−67	15−18
April 7	No. 3 Florida	No. 2 Houston †	Alamodome ● San Antonio, TX	NCAA tournament	Florida 65−63	15−19

† denotes neutral site game

=== Record vs other conferences ===
The Big 12 had a record of 134–38 in non-conference play during the regular season. The Big 12 had a record of 18–11 during tournament play.

Regular season

Power 6 Conferences
Conference	Record
ACC	8–3
Big East	9–5
Big Ten	2–6
Pac-12	0–0
SEC	2–14
Combined	21–28

Other conferences
Conference	Record
American	3–2
ASUN	7–0
Atlantic 10	6–1
Big Sky	7–0
Big South	2–0
Big West	3–0
CAA	2–0
C-USA	2–0
Horizon	8–0
Independents/Non-division I	1–0
Ivy League	2–0
Metro Atlantic	2–0
Mid-American	2–0
Mid-Eastern Athletic	5–0
Missouri Valley	1–1
Mountain West	6–2
Northeast	1–0
Ohio Valley	2–0
Southern	2–0
Southland	6–0
Southwestern Athletic	18–0
Summit	7–0
Sun Belt	5–0
West Coast	5–4
Western Athletic	8–0
Combined	113–10

Postseason

Power 6 Conferences
Conference	Record
ACC	2–2
Big East	2–1
Big Ten	2–2
Pac-12	0–0
SEC	3–5
Combined	9–10

Other conferences
Conference	Record
America East	0–0
American	1–1
ASUN	1–0
Atlantic 10	1–0
Big Sky	0–0
Big South	0–0
Big West	0–0
CAA	1–0
C-USA	0–0
Horizon	0–0
Independents/Non-division I	0–0
Ivy League	0–0
Metro Atlantic	0–0
Mid-American	1–0
Mid-Eastern Athletic	0–0
Missouri Valley	1–0
Mountain West	0–0
Northeast	0–0
Ohio Valley	1–0
Patriot	0–0
Southern	0–0
Southland	0–0
Southwestern Athletic	0–0
Summit	0–0
Sun Belt	0–0
West Coast	2–0
Western Athletic	0–0
Combined	18–11

== Postseason ==
=== Big 12 tournament ===
- The 2025 Big 12 Men's Basketball tournament was played March 11–15, 2025, at T-Mobile Center, Kansas City, MO

2025 Big 12 men's basketball tournament seeds and results
Seed	School	Conf.	Over.	Tiebreaker	First round March 11	Second round March 12	Quarterfinals March 13	Semifinals March 14	Championship March 15
1.	Houston #‡	19–1	35–4		Bye	Bye	W vs. Colorado	W vs. BYU	W vs. Arizona
2.	Texas Tech‡	15–5	28–9		Bye	Bye	W vs. Baylor	L vs. Arizona	–
3.	Arizona‡	14–6	24–13	1–1 vs BYU, 1–1 vs Texas Tech	Bye	Bye	W vs. Kansas	W vs. Texas Tech	L vs. Houston
4.	BYU‡	14–6	26–10	1–1 vs Arizona, 0–1 vs Texas Tech	Bye	Bye	W vs. Iowa State	L vs. Houston	–
5.	Iowa State†	13–7	24–10		Bye	W vs. Cincinnati	L vs. BYU	–	–
6.	Kansas†	11–9	21–13		Bye	W vs. UCF	L vs. Arizona	–	–
7.	Baylor†	10–10	20–15	1–0 vs West Virginia	Bye	W vs. Kansas State	L vs. Texas Tech	–	–
8.	West Virginia†	10–10	19–13	0–1 vs Baylor	Bye	L vs. Colorado	–	–	–
9.	TCU	9–11	16–16	1–0 vs Kansas State	L vs. Colorado	–	–	–	–
10.	Kansas State	9–11	16–17	0–1 vs TCU	W vs. Arizona State	L vs. Colorado	–	–	–
11.	Utah	8–12	16–17		L vs. UCF	–	–	–	–
12.	Oklahoma State	7–13	17–18	2–1 vs Cincinnati/UCF	L vs. Cincinnati	–	–	–	–
13.	Cincinnati	7–13	19–16	1–1 vs Oklahoma State/UCF	W vs. Oklahoma State	L vs. Iowa State	–	–	–
14.	UCF	7–13	19–17	1–2 vs Oklahoma State/Cincinnati	W vs. Utah	L vs. Kansas	–	–	–
15.	Arizona State	4–16	13–20		L vs. Kansas State	–	–	–	–
16.	Colorado	3–17	14–21		W vs. TCU	W vs. West Virginia	L vs. Houston	–	–
# – Big 12 regular season champions, and tournament No. 1 seed ‡ – Received a double-bye into the conference tournament quarterfinal round † – Received a single-bye into the conference tournament second round Overall records include all games played in the Big 12 tournament.

=== Bracket ===
First round Tuesday, March 11
9	TCU	67
16	Colorado	69
12	Oklahoma State	68
13	Cincinnati	87
10	Kansas State	71
15	Arizona State	66
11	Utah	72
14	UCF	87

Second round Wednesday, March 12
8	West Virginia	60
16	Colorado	67
5	Iowa State	76
13	Cincinnati	56
7	Baylor	70
10	Kansas State	56
6	Kansas	98*
14	UCF	94

Quarterfinals; Thursday, March 13
1	Houston	77
16	Colorado	68
4	BYU	96
5	Iowa State	92
2	Texas Tech	76
7	Baylor	74
3	Arizona	88
6	Kansas	77

Semifinals; Friday, March 14
1	Houston	74
4	BYU	54
2	Texas Tech	80
3	Arizona	86

Championship; Saturday, March 15
1	Houston	72
3	Arizona	64

* Indicates overtime game

=== NCAA Tournament ===
Seed	Region	School	First round	Second round	Sweet 16	Elite Eight	Final Four	Championship
1	Midwest	Houston	defeated No. 16 SIU Edwardsville, 78–40	defeated No. 8 Gonzaga, 81–76	defeated No. 4 Purdue, 62–60	defeated No. 2 Tennessee, 69–50	defeated No. 1 Duke, 70–67	lost to No. 1 Florida, 63–65
3	South	Iowa State	defeated No. 14 Lipscomb, 82–55	lost to No. 6 Ole Miss, 78–91				
3	West	Texas Tech	defeated No. 14 UNC Wilmington, 82–72	defeated No. 11 Drake, 77–64	defeated No. 10 Arkansas, 85–83^{OT}	lost to No. 1 Florida, 79–84		
4	East	Arizona	defeated No. 13 Akron, 93–65	defeated No. 5 Oregon, 87–83	lost to No. 1 Duke, 93–100			
6	East	BYU	defeated No. 11 VCU, 80–69	defeated No. 3 Wisconsin, 91–89	lost to No. 2 Alabama, 88–113			
7	West	Kansas	lost to No. 10 Arkansas, 72–77					
9	East	Baylor	defeated No. 8 Mississippi State, 75–72	lost to No. 1 Duke, 66–89				
	Bids	W–L (%):	6–1 (.857)	4–2 (.667)	2–2 (.500)	1–1 (.500)	1–0 (1.000)	TOTAL: 14–7 (.667)

=== NIT ===
Seed	School	First round	Second round	Quarterfinals	Semifinals	Final
4	Oklahoma State	defeated Wichita State, 89−79	defeated No. 1 SMU, 85−83	lost to No. 2 North Texas, 59−61		
	W−L (%):	1–0 (1.000)	1–0 (1.000)	0–1 (.000)	0–0 (–)	TOTAL: 2–1 (.667)

=== CBC ===
Seed	School	First round	Quarterfinals	Semifinals	Final
−	Utah	lost to Butler, 84–86			
−	Cincinnati	defeated DePaul, 83–61	lost to UCF, 80–88		
−	Colorado	lost to Villanova, 64−85			
−	Arizona State	lost to Nebraska, 78–86			
−	UCF	defeated Oregon State, 76–75	defeated Cincinnati, 88–80	defeated Villanova, 104−98^{OT}	lost to Nebraska, 66–77
	W−L (%):	2–3 (.400)	1–1 (.500)	1–0 (1.000)	TOTAL: 4–5 (.444)

== Honors and awards ==
=== All-Big 12 awards and teams ===
2025 Big 12 Men's Basketball Individual Awards
Award	Recipient(s)
Player of the Year	JT Toppin, Texas Tech
Coach of the Year	Kelvin Sampson, Houston
Defensive Player of the Year	Joseph Tugler, Houston
Sixth Man Award	Curtis Jones, Iowa State
Newcomer of the Year	JT Toppin, Texas Tech
Freshman of the Year	V. J. Edgecombe, Baylor
Most Improved Player	Richie Saunders, BYU

2025 Big 12 Men's Basketball All-Conference Teams
First Team	Second Team	Third Team	Defensive Team	Newcomer Team	Freshman Team
Caleb Love, Arizona; Norchad Omier, Baylor; Richie Saunders, BYU; LJ Cryer, Houston; J’Wan Roberts, Houston; Curtis Jones, Iowa State; Hunter Dickinson, Kansas; JT Toppin, Texas Tech; Darrion Williams, Texas Tech; Javon Small, West Virginia	V. J. Edgecombe, Baylor; Keyshawn Hall, UCF; Milos Uzan, Houston; Joshua Jefferson, Iowa State; Chance McMillian, Texas Tech	Joseph Tugler, Houston; Zeke Mayo, Kansas; Coleman Hawkins, Kansas State; Keshon Gilbert, Iowa State; Tamin Lipsey, Iowa State	Jayden Quaintance, Arizona State; J’Wan Roberts, Houston; Joseph Tugler, Houston; Tamin Lipsey, Iowa State; Sencire Harris, West Virginia	Norchad Omier, Baylor; Keyshawn Hall, UCF; Joshua Jefferson, Iowa State; Zeke Mayo, Kansas; JT Toppin, Texas Tech	Jayden Quaintance, Arizona State; V. J. Edgecombe, Baylor; Robert Wright, Baylor; Egor Dëmin, BYU; Christian Anderson, Texas Tech
† - denotes unanimous selection

Honorable Mention: Tobe Awaka (Arizona), Henri Veesaar (Arizona) Robert Wright (Baylor), Egor Dëmin (BYU), Darius Johnson (UCF), Jizzle James (Cincinnati), Julian Hammond III (Colorado), Emanuel Sharp (Houston), Dajuan Harris Jr. (Kansas), David N’Guessan (Kansas State), Bryce Thompson (Oklahoma State), Noah Reynolds (TCU), Ernest Udeh Jr. (TCU), Gabe Madsen (Utah)

=== All-Americans ===
To earn "consensus" status, a player must win honors based on a point system computed from the four different all-America teams. The point system consists of three points for first team, two points for second team and one point for third team. No honorable mention or fourth team or lower are used in the computation. The top five totals plus ties are first team and the next five plus ties are second team.

Player	School	Position	Selector	Consensus
Second Team All-Americans
JT Toppin	Texas Tech	PF	AP, SN, NABC, USBWA	✓
Third Team All-Americans
LJ Cryer	Houston	PG	AP, SN, NABC, USBWA	✓
Hunter Dickinson	Kansas	C	AP, USBWA	

*Associated Press All-America Team
*National Association of Basketball Coaches All-America Team
*Sporting News All-America Team
*USBWA All-America Team

== NBA draft ==
The following list includes all Big 12 players who were drafted in the 2025 NBA draft.

Player	Position	School	Round	Pick	Team
V. J. Edgecombe	Shooting guard	Baylor	1st	3	Philadelphia 76ers
Egor Dëmin	Shooting guard	BYU	1st	8	Brooklyn Nets
Carter Bryant	Small forward	Arizona	1st	14	San Antonio Spurs
Javon Small	Point guard	West Virginia	2nd	48	Memphis Grizzlies

== TV networks ==
Team	ESPN	ESPN2	ESPNU	FOX	FS1	CBS	CBSSN	TBS	TNT	TruTV	Streaming (ESPN+/Peacock/ACCNX/FloSports)
Arizona	14	7	1	0	0	2	1	1	0	1	10
Arizona State	2	4	2	0	1	1	3	0	0	2	18
Baylor	7	5	2	0	1	3	3	0	0	0	14
BYU	3	9	2	1	2	2	1	0	1	0	15
UCF	1	1	3	2	2	0	4	0	0	0	24
Cincinnati	1	7	2	0	4	1	4	0	0	0	17
Colorado	1	5	1	0	1	0	1	0	0	0	26
Houston	8	6	1	0	0	3	2	4	2	0	13
Iowa State	6	6	2	0	1	2	2	0	1	1	14
Kansas	15	7	0	0	1	3	0	0	0	0	8
Kansas State	1	2	1	1	0	2	5	0	0	0	21
Oklahoma State	1	3	5	0	1	1	3	0	0	0	21
TCU	1	5	1	0	1	0	3	0	0	2	19
Texas Tech	5	7	4	0	0	0	2	2	1	1	15
Utah	1	3	1	0	1	0	1	0	0	0	26
West Virginia	1	6	0	0	0	0	4	0	0	0	21
Total	68	83	28	4	16	20	39	7	5	7	282

== Home game attendance ==
Team	Stadium	Capacity	Game 1	Game 2	Game 3	Game 4	Game 5	Game 6	Game 7	Game 8	Game 9	Game 10	Game 11	Game 12	Game 13	Game 14	Game 15	Game 16	Game 17	Game 18	Game 19	Total	Average	% of Capacity
Arizona	McKale Center	14,688	13,597	13,982	14,634	13,747	12,847	13,903	13,650	13,039	14,034	**14,688**†	**14,688**†	**14,688**†	**14,688**†	**14,688**†	14,264	**14,688**†				225,825	14,114	96.10%
Arizona State	Desert Financial Arena	14,198	6,966	6,057	6,294	6,633	7,998	9,449	8,337	12,762	13,544†	6,868	9,026	8,315	9,383	8,895						120,527	8,609	60.63%
Baylor	Foster Pavilion	7,500	**7,500**†	**7,500**†	**7,500**†	**7,500**†	**7,500**†	**7,500**†	**7,500**†	**7,500**†	**7,500**†	**7,500**†	**7,500**†	**7,500**†	**7,500**†	**7,500**†	**7,500**†	**7,500**†				120,000	7,500	100.00%
BYU	Marriott Center	17,978	16,941	17,381	16,789	16,456	16,954	15,950	15,544	16,926	17,307	16,457	17,483	17,297	17,274	17,228	**17,978**†	**17,978**†	**17,978**†			289,921	17,054	94.86%
UCF	Addition Financial Arena	9,432	8,808	7,768	8,302	7,522	6,027	5,817	5,859	6,155	**9,669**†	8,204	9,014	8,003	9,152	7,421	8,614	6,379	7,003	7,116		136,833	7,602	80.89%
Cincinnati	Fifth Third Arena	12,012	10,290	10,604	10,485	10,970	10,913	**12,513**†	11,175	11,212	12,003	11,090	10,790	11,085	12,217	10,510	10,648	10,598	10,814			187,917	11,054	92.14%
Colorado	CU Events Center	11,064	5,679	6,152	5,358	6,288	5,235	9,143†	5,942	7,684	9,157	6,975	6,576	6,166	6,189	7,485	7,212	7,431	11,042	7,057		126,771	7,043	63.65%
Houston	Fertitta Center	7,100	7,035	7,035	7,035	7,035	7,035	7,035	7,035	7,035	7,035	7,035	7,035	**7,324**	7,035	7,035	**7,377**†	7,035	**7,231**			120,422	7,084	99.76%
Iowa State	Hilton Coliseum	14,267	13,616	13,464	13,615	**14,267**†	13,658	**14,267**†	**14,267**†	**14,267**†	13,496	**14,267**†	**14,267**†	**14,267**†	**14,267**†	**14,267**†	**14,267**†	**14,267**†	**14,267**†			239,053	14,062	98.56%
Kansas	Allen Fieldhouse	15,300	**15,300**†	**15,300**†	**15,300**†	**15,300**†	**15,300**†	**15,300**†	**15,300**†	**15,300**†	**15,300**†	**15,300**†	**15,300**†	**15,300**†	**15,300**†	**15,300**†	**15,300**†	**15,300**†	**15,300**†			260,100	15,300	100.00%
Kansas State	Bramlage Coliseum	11,000	9,155	9,928	9,507	8,416	7,971	9,970	8,332	8,019	9,018	8,542	**11,010**†	8,914	9,121	8,832	8,720					135,455	9,030	82.09%
Oklahoma State	Gallagher-Iba Arena	13,611	7,251	5,447	5,804	5,188	6,349	7,365	5,540	7,247	6,355	7,040	5,639	7,702†	5,122	5,903	6,597					94,549	6,303	46.30%
TCU	Schollmaier Arena	6,700	5,127	5,026	4,815	4,707	5,156	4,781	5,135	6,108	4,752	5,459	6,055	5,029	4,878	5,424	6,339	5,477	6,621†			90,889	5,346	79.79%
Texas Tech	United Supermarkets Arena	15,300	12,034	13,610	11,456	9,847	13,274	11,465	9,967	10,013	12,767	14,263	15,098†	13,794	14,114	15,098†	13,290	14,466	15,098†	15,098†		234,752	13,042	84.45%
Utah	Jon M. Huntsman Center	15,000	6,785	6,722	6,757	6,969	6,604	7,064	7,435	7,370	6,699	7,798	7,922	**15,558**†	8,311	7,570	7,581	11,056	7,537	8,760	7,763	152,261	8,013	53.42%
West Virginia	WVU Coliseum	14,000	9,229	10,017	8,591	11,522	8,711	9,651	10,777	11,753†	10,566	**14,444**†	10,528	12,083	13,166	10,879	10,683	10,167	12,523			185,290	10,899	77.85%
Total		12,447																				2,720,565	10,151	81.55%

Bold – At or exceed capacity
†Season high
