= 2024–25 Kansas State Wildcats men's basketball team =

American college basketball season

2024–25 Kansas State Wildcats men's basketball
- Conference: Big 12 Conference
- Record: 16–17 (9–11 Big 12)
- Head coach: Jerome Tang (3rd season)
- Associate head coach: Ulric Maligi (3rd season)
- Assistant coaches: Jareem Dowling; Rodney Perry
- Home arena: Bramlage Coliseum

2024–25 Big 12 men's basketball standings
	Conf.				Overall
Team	W		L	PCT	W		L	PCT
No. 2 Houston †	19	–	1	.950	35	–	5	.875
No. 8 Texas Tech	15	–	5	.750	28	–	9	.757
No. 15 Arizona	14	–	6	.700	24	–	13	.649
No. 13 BYU	14	–	6	.700	26	–	10	.722
No. 17 Iowa State	13	–	7	.650	25	–	10	.714
Kansas	11	–	9	.550	21	–	13	.618
Baylor	10	–	10	.500	20	–	15	.571
West Virginia	10	–	10	.500	19	–	13	.594
TCU	9	–	11	.450	16	–	16	.500
Kansas State	9	–	11	.450	16	–	17	.485
Utah	8	–	12	.400	16	–	17	.485
Oklahoma State	7	–	13	.350	17	–	18	.486
Cincinnati	7	–	13	.350	19	–	16	.543
UCF	7	–	13	.350	20	–	17	.541
Arizona State	4	–	16	.200	13	–	20	.394
Colorado	3	–	17	.150	14	–	21	.400
† 2025 Big 12 tournament winner Rankings from AP poll

The 2024–25 Kansas State Wildcats men's basketball team represented Kansas State University in the 2024–25 NCAA Division I men's basketball season, their 122nd basketball season. The Wildcats were led by third-year head coach Jerome Tang and played their home games in Bramlage Coliseum in Manhattan, Kansas as members of the Big 12 Conference. The finished the season 16–17, 9–11 in Big 12 play to finish a tie for ninth place. As the No. 10 seed in the Big 12 tournament, they defeated Arizona State before losing to Baylor.

== Previous season ==
The Wildcats finished the 2023–24 season 19–15, 8–10 in Big 12 play to finish in a tie for ninth place. They lost in the Quarterfinals of the Big 12 tournament to Iowa State. They received an at-large bid to the NIT in the Villanova Bracket. They lost to Iowa in the first round.

== Offseason ==
=== Departures ===
Name	Number	Pos.	Height	Weight	Year	Hometown	Reason for departure
Arthur Kaluma	24	F	6'8"	225	Junior	Glendale, AZ	Transferred to Texas

=== Incoming transfers ===
Name	Number	Pos.	Height	Weight	Year	Hometown	Previous school
Dug McDaniel	0	G	5'11"	175	Junior	Washington, D.C.	Michigan
Max Jones	2	G	6'4"	210	Senior	Clearwater, FL	Cal State Fullerton
C. J. Jones	3	G	6'5"	195	Junior	East St. Louis, IL	UIC
Mobi Ikegwuruka	4	G	6'6"	205	Sophomore	Galway, Ireland	Ellsworth CC
Coleman Hawkins	33	F	6'10"	230	Senior	Sacramento, CA	Illinois

== Preseason ==
Big 12 Preseason Poll

	Big 12 Coaches	Points
1.	Kansas	215 (9)
2.	Houston	211 (5)
3.	Iowa State	194 (1)
4.	Baylor	185
5.	Arizona	179 (1)
6.	Cincinnati	140
7.	Texas Tech	135
8.	Kansas State	133
9.	BYU	116
10.	TCU	90
11.	UCF	83
12.	Arizona State	64
13.	West Virginia	62
14.	Oklahoma State	46
15.	Colorado	37
16.	Utah	30
Reference: (#) first-place votes

Pre-Season All-Big 12 Team

First Team

Player	School
Caleb Love	Arizona
LJ Cryer	Houston
J’Wan Roberts	Houston
Tamin Lipsey	Iowa State
Hunter Dickinson†	Kansas
† denotes unanimous selection Reference:

Second Team

Player	School
Norchad Omier	Baylor
Jeremy Roach	Baylor
Keshon Gilbert	Iowa State
Dajuan Harris Jr.	Kansas
Coleman Hawkins	Kansas State
† denotes unanimous selection Reference:

- Player of the Year: Hunter Dickinson, Kansas
- Co-Newcomer of the Year: Jeremy Roach, Baylor & Coleman Hawkins, Kansas State
- Freshman of the Year: V. J. Edgecombe, Baylor

== Roster ==
2024–25 Kansas State Wildcats men's basketball team
Players
Coaches

Pos.	#	Name	Height	Weight	Year	Previous school	Hometown
G	0	Dug McDaniel	5 ft 11 in (1.8 m)	175 lb (79 kg)	Jr	Michigan	Washington, D.C.
F	1	David N'Guessan	6 ft 9 in (2.06 m)	220 lb (100 kg)	GS	Virginia Tech	De Lier, Netherlands
G	2	Max Jones	6 ft 4 in (1.93 m)	210 lb (95 kg)	Sr	Cal State Fullerton	Clearwater, FL
G	3	C.J. Jones	6 ft 5 in (1.96 m)	195 lb (88 kg)	Jr	UIC	East St. Louis, Illinois
G	4	Mobi Ikegwuruka	6 ft 6 in (1.98 m)	205 lb (93 kg)	So	Ellsworth Community College	Galway, Ireland
G	10	David Castillo	6 ft 1 in (1.85 m)	170 lb (77 kg)	Fr	Sunrise Christian School	Bartlesville, Oklahoma
G	11	Brendan Hausen	6 ft 4 in (1.93 m)	205 lb (93 kg)	Jr	Villanova	Amarillo, Texas
F	14	Achor Achor	6 ft 9 in (2.06 m)	227 lb (103 kg)	Sr	Samford	Melbourne, Australia
F	15	Taj Manning	6 ft 8 in (2.03 m)	220 lb (100 kg)	RS So	La Lumiere School	Grandview, Missouri
F	21	Baye Fall	6 ft 11 in (2.11 m)	215 lb (98 kg)	So	Accelerated Prep	Dakar, Senegal
F	23	Macaleab Rich	6 ft 7 in (2.01 m)	240 lb (109 kg)	So	East St. Louis	East St. Louis, Illinois
F	33	Coleman Hawkins	6 ft 10 in (2.08 m)	230 lb (104 kg)	Sr	Illinois	Sacramento, California
C	34	Ugonna Onyenso	7 ft 0 in (2.13 m)	245 lb (111 kg)	Jr	Putnam Science Academy	Owerri, Nigeria

Head coach

- Jerome Tang (Charter Oak)

Assistant coach(es)

- Ulric Maligi (Howard)
- Jareem Dowling (Maryland Eastern Shore)
- Rodney Perry (Dallas Christian)

Legend

- (C) Team captain
- (S) Suspended
- (I) Ineligible
- (W) Walk-on
- Injured
- Current redshirt

Roster

== Schedule and results ==
Date time, TV	Rank^{#}	Opponent^{#}	Result	Record	High points	High rebounds	High assists	Site (attendance) city, state
Exhibition
October 29, 2024*; 7:00 p.m., ESPN+		Fort Hays State	W 70–56		15 – Hausen	9 – N'Guessan	6 – Hawkins	Bramlage Coliseum (9,526); Manhattan, KS
Non-conference regular season
November 5, 2024*; 7:00 p.m., ESPN+		New Orleans	W 89–65	1–0	21 – N’Guessan	15 – N’Guessan	9 – McDaniel	Bramlage Coliseum (9,155); Manhattan, KS
November 9, 2024*; 3:00 p.m., ESPN+		Cleveland State	W 77–64	2–0	22 – Hayden	3 – Hausen	5 – Hawkins	Bramlage Coliseum (9,928); Manhattan, KS
November 14, 2024*; 8:00 p.m., ESPN+		LSU	L 65–76	2–1	16 – Tied	5 – N’Guessan	5 – McDaniel	Bramlage Coliseum (9,507); Manhattan, KS
November 19, 2024; 7:00 p.m., ESPN+		Mississippi Valley State	W 74–56	3–1	16 – Onyenso	12 – Hawkins	4 – Hawkins	Bramlage Coliseum (8,416); Manhattan, KS
November 22, 2024*; 7:00 p.m., ESPN+		vs. George Washington; Paradise Jam Quarterfinal	W 83–71	4–1	17 – N'Guessan	9 – Tied	5 – McDaniel	Sports and Fitness Center (2,125); Saint Thomas, U.S. Virgin Islands
November 24, 2024*; 7:00 p.m., ESPN+		vs. Liberty; Paradise Jam Semifinal	L 65–67	4–2	14 – Hausen	7 – M. Jones	4 – Hawkins	Sports and Fitness Center (2,225); Saint Thomas, U.S. Virgin Islands
November 25, 2024*; 4:30 p.m., ESPN+		vs. Longwood; Paradise Jam Third Place	W 80–64	5–2	19 – Hawkins	10 – Hawkins	6 – McDaniel	Sports and Fitness Center (1,986); Saint Thomas, U.S. Virgin Islands
December 1, 2024; 1:00 p.m., ESPN+		Arkansas–Pine Bluff	W 120–73	6–2	21 – Achor	8 – N'Guessan	10 – McDaniel	Bramlage Coliseum (7,971); Manhattan, KS
December 7, 2024*; 10:30 a.m., Fox		at St. John's; Big East–Big 12 Battle	L 71–88	6–3	27 – Hausen	9 – Hawkins	4 – M. Jones	Carnesecca Arena (5,602); Queens, N.Y.
December 17, 2024*; 7:00 p.m., ESPN+		vs. Drake; Wildcat Classic	L 70–73 ^{OT}	6–4	16 – Hawkins	9 – N'Guessan	5 – Hawkins	T-Mobile Center (9,210); Kansas City, MO
December 21, 2024*; 6:00 p.m., ESPN+		at Wichita State	L 65–84	6–5	20 – Rich	9 – Hawkins	8 – Hawkins	Charles Koch Arena (8,253); Wichita, KS
Big 12 regular season
December 30, 2024; 6:00 p.m., CBSSN		No. 16 Cincinnati	W 70–67	7–5 (1–0)	20 – Hawkins	10 – Hawkins	4 – Hausen	Bramlage Coliseum (9,970); Manhattan, KS
January 4, 2025; 3:00 p.m., CBSSN		at TCU	L 62–63	7–6 (1–1)	12 – McDaniel	17 – N’Guessan	5 – McDaniel	Schollmaier Arena (6,108); Fort Worth, TX
January 7, 2025; 7:00 p.m., ESPN+		at Oklahoma State	L 66–79	7–7 (1–2)	18 – Hawkins	12 – N’Guessan	4 – N’Guessan	Gallagher-Iba Arena (5,540); Stillwater, OK
January 11, 2025; 5:00 p.m., ESPN+		No. 12 Houston	L 57–87	7–8 (1–3)	15 – Hausen	5 – Tied	4 – 13–5	Bramlage Coliseum (8,332); Manhattan, KS
January 14, 2025; 8:00 p.m., CBSSN		Texas Tech	L 57–61	7–9 (1–4)	13 – Hausen	9 – Jones	3 – Hawkins	Bramlage Coliseum (8,019); Manhattan, KS
January 18, 2025; 12:00 p.m., CBS		at No. 9 Kansas; Sunflower Showdown	L 74–84	7–10 (1–5)	15 – Hawkins	7 – Hawkins	10 – Hawkins	Allen Fieldhouse (15,300); Lawrence, KS
January 22, 2025; 8:00 p.m., ESPNU		at Baylor	L 62–70	7–11 (1–6)	13 – N’Guessan	11 – N’Guessan	7 – Hawkins	Foster Pavilion (7,500); Waco, TX
January 25, 2025; 5:00 p.m., CBSSN		No. 23 West Virginia	W 73–60	8–11 (2–6)	15 – McDaniel	7 – Tied	6 – McDaniel	Bramlage Coliseum (9,018); Manhattan, KS
January 29, 2025; 7:00 p.m., CBSSN		Oklahoma State	W 85–57	9–11 (3–6)	18 – Hausen	9 – Hawkins	6 – Tied	Bramlage Coliseum (8,542); Manhattan, KS
February 1, 2025; 1:00 p.m., ESPN2		at No. 3 Iowa State	W 80–61	10–11 (4–6)	20 – McDaniel	8 – N’Guessan	5 – McDaniel	Hilton Coliseum (14,267); Ames, IA
February 4, 2025; 9:00 p.m., ESPN+		at Arizona State	W 71–70	11–11 (5–6)	22 – N’Guessan	8 – Tied	7 – Hawkins	Desert Financial Arena (6,868); Tempe, AZ
February 8, 2025; 1:00 p.m., ESPN		No. 16 Kansas; Sunflower Showdown	W 81–73	12–11 (6–6)	20 – N'Guessan	7 – N'Guessan	11 – McDaniel	Bramlage Coliseum (11,010); Manhattan, KS
February 11, 2025; 7:00 p.m., ESPN+		No. 13 Arizona	W 73–70	13–11 (7–6)	24 – McDaniel	7 – Tied	4 – Hawkins	Bramlage Coliseum (8,914); Manhattan, KS
February 15, 2025; 8:00 p.m., ESPN+		at BYU	L 65–80	13–12 (7–7)	22 – McDaniel	8 – Hawkins	3 – N'Guessan	Marriott Center (17,228); Provo, UT
February 17, 2025; 10:00 p.m., ESPN2		at Utah	L 69–74	13–13 (7–8)	17 – Hausen	7 – N'Guessan	7 – Hawkins	Jon M. Huntsman Center (7,537); Salt Lake City, UT
February 23, 2025; 3:00 p.m., ESPN+		Arizona State	L 54–66	13–14 (7–9)	18 – N'Guessan	11 – N'Guessan	7 – McDaniel	Bramlage Coliseum (9,121); Manhattan, KS
February 26, 2025; 6:00 p.m., ESPN+		at UCF	L 76–80	13–15 (7–10)	22 – Jones	4 – Tied	9 – McDaniel	Addition Financial Arena (7,003); Orlando, FL
March 2, 2025; 3:00 p.m., ESPN+		Colorado	W 65–56	14–15 (8–10)	21 – N'Guessan	8 – N'Guessan	7 – McDaniel	Bramlage Coliseum (8,832); Manhattan, KS
March 5, 2025; 6:00 p.m., ESPN+		at Cincinnati	W 54–49	15–15 (9–10)	18 – N'Guessan	10 – N'Guessan	4 – Tied	Fifth Third Arena (10,814); Cincinnati, OH
March 8, 2025; 12:30 p.m., CBS		No. 10 Iowa State	L 57–73	15–16 (9–11)	19 – N'Guessan	9 – Hawkins	6 – McDaniel	Bramlage Coliseum (8,720); Manhattan, KS
Big 12 tournament
March 11, 2025; 6:00 p.m., ESPN+	(10)	vs. (15) Arizona State; First round	W 71–66	16–16	26 – Hawkins	7 – Hawkins	5 – McDaniel	T-Mobile Center (12,929); Kansas City, MO
March 12, 2025; 6:00 p.m., ESPN+	(10)	vs. (7) Baylor; Second round	L 56–70	16–17	20 – N'Guessan	10 – N'Guessan	5 – McDaniel	T-Mobile Center (15,431); Kansas City, MO
*Non-conference game. ^{#}Rankings from AP Poll. (#) Tournament seedings in parentheses. All times are in Central Time.

== Rankings ==
Ranking movements Legend: ██ Increase in ranking ██ Decrease in ranking — = Not ranked RV = Received votes
	Week																				
Poll	Pre	1	2	3	4	5	6	7	8	9	10	11	12	13	14	15	16	17	18	19	Final
AP	RV	RV	RV	—	—	—	—	—	—	—	—	—	—	—	—	—	—	—	—	—	—
Coaches	RV	RV	—	—	—	—	—	—	—	—	—	—	—	—	—	—	—	—	—	—	—
