= 2024–25 Kansas Jayhawks men's basketball team =

American college basketball season

2024–25 Kansas Jayhawks men's basketball

NCAA tournament, First Round
- Conference: Big 12 Conference
- Record: 21–13 (11–9 Big 12)
- Head coach: Bill Self (22nd season)
- Assistant coaches: Jeremy Case (4th season); Norm Roberts (14th season); Kurtis Townsend (21st season); Joe Dooley (11th season); Chase Buford (1st season)
- Home arena: Allen Fieldhouse

2024–25 Big 12 men's basketball standings
	Conf.				Overall
Team	W		L	PCT	W		L	PCT
No. 2 Houston †	19	–	1	.950	35	–	5	.875
No. 8 Texas Tech	15	–	5	.750	28	–	9	.757
No. 15 Arizona	14	–	6	.700	24	–	13	.649
No. 13 BYU	14	–	6	.700	26	–	10	.722
No. 17 Iowa State	13	–	7	.650	25	–	10	.714
Kansas	11	–	9	.550	21	–	13	.618
Baylor	10	–	10	.500	20	–	15	.571
West Virginia	10	–	10	.500	19	–	13	.594
TCU	9	–	11	.450	16	–	16	.500
Kansas State	9	–	11	.450	16	–	17	.485
Utah	8	–	12	.400	16	–	17	.485
Oklahoma State	7	–	13	.350	17	–	18	.486
Cincinnati	7	–	13	.350	19	–	16	.543
UCF	7	–	13	.350	20	–	17	.541
Arizona State	4	–	16	.200	13	–	20	.394
Colorado	3	–	17	.150	14	–	21	.400
† 2025 Big 12 tournament winner Rankings from AP poll

The 2024–25 Kansas Jayhawks men's basketball team represented the University of Kansas in the 2024–25 NCAA Division I men's basketball season, the Jayhawks' 127th basketball season. The Jayhawks, members of the Big 12 Conference, played their home games at Allen Fieldhouse in Lawrence, Kansas. They were led by 22nd year Hall of Fame head coach Bill Self.

The Kansas Jayhawks drew an average home attendance of 15,300, the 10th-highest of all college basketball teams.

== Offseason ==
=== Coaching staff changes ===
As of May 2024, no coaches had left Kansas.

=== Entered NBA draft ===
Players listed below were underclassmen who had entered the 2024 NBA draft. Class provided was class from previous season.

Name	Position	Class	Returned?
Johnny Furphy	G	Freshman	No

=== Graduating players ===
Players listed below were seniors from the previous season who either had run out of eligibility or seniors with an extra year of eligibility due to the COVID-19 pandemic who had not announced a return to the team. Players with an asterisk next to their name still had remaining eligibility and could decide to return to the program, but had not declared for their remaining year.

Name	Position
Parker Braun	F
Michael Jankovich*	F
Kevin McCullar Jr.	G
Nick Timberlake	G

=== Returning fifth year seniors ===
Players below were seniors returning for a fifth year.

Name	Position
Dajuan Harris Jr.	G
Hunter Dickinson	C

=== Transfers ===
No outgoing transfers had been announced as of March 2024.

==== Incoming ====
Name	Position	Class	Old school
Zeke Mayo	Guard	Senior	South Dakota State
AJ Storr	Guard	Junior	Wisconsin
Rylan Griffen	Guard	Junior	Alabama
Noah Shelby	Guard	Junior	Rice
Shakeel Moore	Guard	Senior	Mississippi State
David Coit	Guard	Senior	Northern Illinois

=== Walk-ons ===
Name	Position
Will Thengvall	G

=== 2024 recruiting class ===
College recruiting
Name	Hometown	School	Height	Weight	Commit date
Flory Bidunga; Center	Kokomo, IN	Kokomo	6 ft 9 in (2.06 m)	220 lb (100 kg)	Aug 12, 2023
Flory Bidunga; Center	Recruit ratings: Rivals: 247Sports: ESPN: (92)				
Rakease Passmore; Forward	Lincolnton, NC	Combine	6 ft 5 in (1.96 m)	180 lb (82 kg)	Oct 11, 2023
Rakease Passmore; Forward	Recruit ratings: Rivals: 247Sports: ESPN: (88)				
Overall recruiting rankings: 247 Sports: 9 Rivals: 10 ESPN: N/A*

*ESPN has not made 2024 recruiting class rankings yet

== Preseason ==
Big 12 Preseason Poll

	Big 12 Coaches	Points
1.	Kansas	215 (9)
2.	Houston	211 (5)
3.	Iowa State	194 (1)
4.	Baylor	185
5.	Arizona	179 (1)
6.	Cincinnati	140
7.	Texas Tech	135
8.	Kansas State	133
9.	BYU	116
10.	TCU	90
11.	UCF	83
12.	Arizona State	64
13.	West Virginia	62
14.	Oklahoma State	46
15.	Colorado	37
16.	Utah	30
Reference: (#) first-place votes

Pre-Season All-Big 12 Team

First Team

Player	School
Caleb Love	Arizona
LJ Cryer	Houston
J’Wan Roberts	Houston
Tamin Lipsey	Iowa State
Hunter Dickinson†	Kansas
† denotes unanimous selection Reference:

Second Team

Player	School
Norchad Omier	Baylor
Jeremy Roach	Baylor
Keshon Gilbert	Iowa State
Dajuan Harris Jr	Kansas
Coleman Hawkins	Kansas State
† denotes unanimous selection Reference:

- Player of the Year: Hunter Dickinson, Kansas
- Co-Newcomer of the Year: Jeremy Roach, Baylor & Coleman Hawkins, Kansas State
- Freshman of the Year: V. J. Edgecombe, Baylor

== Roster ==
Roster below was based on the 2023–24 roster with outgoing players removed and incoming players added. The roster underwent multiple changes, as players left via the NBA draft or transfers, and players were added via the transfer portal and recruiting. Heights and weights for new players were based on recruiting profile for freshmen. For transfers, they were based on what their listing was at their old school. Heights, weights, and numbers may change before the start of the season as well.

2024–25 Kansas Jayhawks men's basketball team
Players
Coaches

Pos.	#	Name	Height	Weight	Year	Hometown
G	0	Shakeel Moore	6 ft 1 in (1.85 m)	190 lb (86 kg)	Sr	Greensboro, NC
C	1	Hunter Dickinson	7 ft 2 in (2.18 m)	265 lb (120 kg)	Sr	Alexandria, VA
G	2	AJ Storr	6 ft 7 in (2.01 m)	205 lb (93 kg)	Jr	Rockford, IL
G	3	Dajuan Harris Jr.	6 ft 2 in (1.88 m)	175 lb (79 kg)	RS Sr	Columbia, MO
F	4	Rakease Passmore	6 ft 5 in (1.96 m)	185 lb (84 kg)	Fr	Palatka, FL
G	5	Zeke Mayo	6 ft 4 in (1.93 m)	185 lb (84 kg)	Jr	Lawrence, KS
G	6	Rylan Griffen	6 ft 6 in (1.98 m)	190 lb (86 kg)	Jr	Dallas, TX
G	7	Noah Shelby (W) (redshirt)	6 ft 3 in (1.91 m)	185 lb (84 kg)	Jr	McKinney, TX
G	8	David Coit	5 ft 11 in (1.8 m)	175 lb (79 kg)	Sr	Columbus, NJ
G	11	Jamari McDowell	6 ft 4 in (1.93 m)	180 lb (82 kg)	So	Manvel, TX
G	12	Wilder Evers (W)	6 ft 4 in (1.93 m)	185 lb (84 kg)	So	Birmingham, AL
G	13	Elmarko Jackson (injured)	6 ft 3 in (1.91 m)	195 lb (88 kg)	So	Marlton, NJ
G	14	Patrick Cassidy (W)	6 ft 1 in (1.85 m)	185 lb (84 kg)	Sr	Columbus, KS
G	15	Will Thengvall (W)	6 ft 3 in (1.91 m)	185 lb (84 kg)	Fr	Wichita, KS
F	22	Dillon Wilhite (W)	6 ft 9 in (2.06 m)	240 lb (109 kg)	RS So	San Diego, CA
F	24	K. J. Adams Jr.	6 ft 7 in (2.01 m)	235 lb (107 kg)	Sr	Austin, TX
G	25	Justin Cross (W)	6 ft 8 in (2.03 m)	200 lb (91 kg)	Sr	Oak Park, IL
C	40	Flory Bidunga	6 ft 9 in (2.06 m)	220 lb (100 kg)	Fr	Kinshasa, DR Congo
F	41	Zach Clemence	6 ft 11 in (2.11 m)	230 lb (104 kg)	RS Jr	San Antonio, TX

Head coach

- Bill Self (Oklahoma State)

Assistant coach(es)

- Norm Roberts (Queens (NY))
- Kurtis Townsend (Western Kentucky)
- Jeremy Case (Kansas)
- Joe Dooley (George Washington)
- Chase Buford (Kansas)

Legend

- (C) Team captain
- (S) Suspended
- (I) Ineligible
- (W) Walk-on
- Injured
- Current redshirt

Roster
Last update: August 12, 2024

== Schedule ==
The Jayhawks non-conference schedule was announced in the summer and the conference schedule was announced in the fall. Confirmed games include Michigan State in the Champions Classic, a road game against rival Missouri, and Creighton in the 2024 Big East–Big 12 Battle.

With four schools joining or rejoining the Big 12, bringing the number of teams in the conference to 16, the conference is adopting a 20-game schedule. Each team will face five schools at home, five away, and five both home and away. Due to the tournament format, the Jayhawks were guaranteed one game in the 2025 Big 12 Tournament.

Date time, TV	Rank^{#}	Opponent^{#}	Result	Record	High points	High rebounds	High assists	Site (attendance) city, state
Exhibition
October 25, 2024*; 8:00 pm, SECN	No. 1	at No. 16 Arkansas	L 69–85	–	26 – Harris Jr.	7 – Adams Jr.	3 – Passmore	Bud Walton Arena (19,200); Fayetteville, AR
October 29, 2024*; 7:00 p.m., ESPN+	No. 1	Washburn	W 84–53	–	19 – Coit	7 – Bidunga	4 – Tied	Allen Fieldhouse (15,300); Lawrence, KS
Non-conference regular season
November 4, 2024*; 7:00 p.m., ESPN+	No. 1	Howard	W 87–55	1–0	19 – Mayo	7 – Tied	5 – Harris Jr.	Allen Fieldhouse (15,300); Lawrence, KS
November 8, 2024*; 6:00 p.m., ESPN2	No. 1	No. 9 North Carolina	W 92–89	2–0	21 – Mayo	10 – Dickinson	4 – Mayo	Allen Fieldhouse (15,300); Lawrence, KS
November 12, 2024*; 5:30 p.m., ESPN	No. 1	vs. Michigan State; Champions Classic	W 77–69	3–0	28 – Dickinson	12 – Dickinson	7 – Mayo	State Farm Arena (16,107); Atlanta, GA
November 16, 2024*; 5:00 p.m., ESPN+	No. 1	Oakland	W 78–57	4–0	16 – Storr	9 – Dickinson	6 – Harris	Allen Fieldhouse (15,300); Lawrence, KS
November 19, 2024*; 7:00 p.m., ESPN+	No. 1	UNC Wilmington	W 84–66	5–0	17 – Harris	15 – Dickinson	6 – Harris	Allen Fieldhouse (15,300); Lawrence, KS
November 26, 2024*; 8:00 p.m., ESPN	No. 1	vs. No. 11 Duke; Vegas Showdown	W 75–72	6–0	14 – Harris Jr.	8 – Bidunga	9 – Harris Jr.	T-Mobile Arena (14,757); Paradise, NV
November 30, 2024*; 5:00 p.m., ESPN+	No. 1	Furman; Vegas Showdown campus game	W 86–51	7–0	22 – Adams	6 – Tied	8 – Harris Jr.	Allen Fieldhouse (15,300); Lawrence, KS
December 4, 2024*; 7:30 p.m., FS1	No. 1	at Creighton; Big East–Big 12 Battle	L 63–76	7–1	15 – Harris	8 – Dickinson	5 – Harris	CHI Health Center Omaha (17,908); Omaha, NE
December 8, 2024*; 12:00 pm, ESPN2	No. 1	at Missouri; Border War	L 67–76	7–2	19 – Dickinson	14 – Dickinson	5 – Harris Jr.	Mizzou Arena (15,061); Columbia, MO
December 14, 2024*; 2:15 p.m., ESPN	No. 10	NC State	W 75–60	8–2	26 – Mayo	14 – Dickinson	7 – Dickinson	Allen Fieldhouse (15,300); Lawrence, KS
December 22, 2024*; 2:00 p.m., ESPN	No. 8	Brown	W 87–53	9–2	25 – Mayo	13 – Dickinson	4 – Tied	Allen Fieldhouse (15,300); Lawrence, KS
Big 12 regular season
December 31, 2024; 1:00 p.m., ESPN+	No. 7	West Virginia	L 61–62	9–3 (0–1)	27 – Mayo	12 – Dickinson	7 – Harris Jr.	Allen Fieldhouse (15,300); Lawrence, KS
January 5, 2025; 3:00 p.m., ESPN+	No. 7	at UCF	W 99–48	10–3 (1–1)	27 – Dickinson	9 – Tied	8 – Mayo	Addition Financial Arena (9,669); Orlando, FL
January 8, 2025; 8:00 p.m., ESPN2	No. 11	Arizona State	W 74–55	11–3 (2–1)	23 – Mayo	12 – Dickinson	7 – Harris	Allen Fieldhouse (15,300); Lawrence, KS
January 11, 2025; 1:00 p.m., ESPN+	No. 11	at Cincinnati	W 54–40	12–3 (3–1)	14 – Dickinson	12 – Dickinson	2 – Tied	Fifth Third Arena (12,003); Cincinnati, OH
January 15, 2025; 6:00 p.m., ESPN2	No. 9	at No. 2 Iowa State	L 57–74	12–4 (3–2)	17 – Mayo	8 – Dickinson	7 – Harris	Hilton Coliseum (14,267); Ames, IA
January 18, 2025; 12:00 p.m., CBS	No. 9	Kansas State; Sunflower Showdown	W 84–74	13–4 (4–2)	25 – Dickinson	9 – Bidunga	5 – Harris	Allen Fieldhouse (15,300); Lawrence, KS
January 22, 2025; 6:00 p.m., ESPN2	No. 12	at TCU	W 74–61	14–4 (5–2)	16 – Dickinson	10 – Bidunga	6 – Harris	Schollmaier Arena (6,055); Fort Worth, TX
January 25, 2025; 5:30 p.m., ESPN	No. 12	No. 7 Houston	L 86–92 ^{2OT}	14–5 (5–3)	19 – Bidunga	9 – Mayo	12 – Harris	Allen Fieldhouse (15,300); Lawrence, KS
January 28, 2025; 7:00 p.m., ESPN+	No. 11	UCF	W 91–87	15–5 (6–3)	24 – Tied	11 – Bidunga	5 – Mayo	Allen Fieldhouse (15,300); Lawrence, KS
February 1, 2025; 3:00 p.m., ESPN	No. 11	at Baylor	L 70–81	15–6 (6–4)	21 – Dickinson	6 – Adams	8 – Harris	Foster Pavilion (7,500); Waco, TX
February 3, 2025; 8:00 p.m., ESPN	No. 16	No. 8 Iowa State	W 69–52	16–6 (7–4)	17 – Mayo	7 – Mayo	5 – Adams	Allen Fieldhouse (15,300); Lawrence, KS
February 8, 2025; 1:00 p.m., ESPN	No. 16	at Kansas State; Sunflower Showdown	L 73–81	16–7 (7–5)	21 – Dickinson	9 – Dickinson	6 – Harris	Bramlage Coliseum (11,010); Manhattan, KS
February 11, 2025; 8:00 p.m., ESPN2	No. 17	Colorado	W 71–59	17–7 (8–5)	19 – Dickinson	9 – Dickinson	5 – Tied	Allen Fieldhouse (15,300); Lawrence, KS
February 15, 2025; 9:00 p.m., ESPN	No. 17	at Utah	L 67–74	17–8 (8–6)	15 – Mayo	7 – Dickinson	4 – Harris	Jon M. Huntsman Center (11,056); Salt Lake City, UT
February 18, 2025; 8:00 p.m., ESPN	No. 23	at BYU	L 57–91	17–9 (8–7)	12 – Dickinson	14 – Dickinson	7 – Harris	Marriott Center (17,978); Provo, UT
February 22, 2025; 3:00 p.m., CBS	No. 23	Oklahoma State	W 96–64	18–9 (9–7)	16 – Dickinson	16 – Bidunga	6 – Griffen	Allen Fieldhouse (15,300); Lawrence, KS
February 24, 2025; 10:00 p.m., ESPN		at Colorado	W 71–64	19–9 (10–7)	32 – Dickinson	13 – Dickinson	5 – Harris	CU Events Center (11,042); Boulder, CO
March 1, 2025; 1:00 p.m., ESPN		No. 10 Texas Tech	L 73–78	19–10 (10–8)	21 – Adams	13 – Adams	7 – Harris	Allen Fieldhouse (15,300); Lawrence, KS
March 3, 2025; 8:00 p.m., ESPN		at No. 3 Houston	L 59–65	19–11 (10–9)	17 – Dickinson	12 – Dickinson	4 – Coit	Fertitta Center (7,231); Houston, TX
March 8, 2025; 3:30 p.m., ESPN		No. 24 Arizona	W 83–76	20–11 (11–9)	33 – Dickinson	10 – Dickinson	9 – Harris	Allen Fieldhouse (15,300); Lawrence, KS
Big 12 tournament
March 12, 2025; 8:30 p.m., ESPN2	(6)	vs. (14) UCF; Second Round	W 98–94 ^{OT}	21–11	24 – Mayo	13 – Dickinson	7 – Harris	T-Mobile Center (15,431); Kansas City, MO
March 13, 2025; 8:30 p.m., ESPN	(6)	vs. (3) Arizona; Quarterfinals	L 77–88	21–12	20 – Mayo	12 – Dickinson	5 – Adams	T-Mobile Center (15,491); Kansas City, MO
NCAA Tournament
March 20, 2025; 6:10 p.m., CBS	(7 W)	vs. (10 W) Arkansas; First Round	L 72–79	21–13	18 – Mayo	9 – Dickinson	7 – Harris	Amica Mutual Pavilion; Providence, RI
*Non-conference game. ^{#}Rankings from AP poll. (#) Tournament seedings in parentheses. W=West. All times are in Central Time.

== Rankings ==
Ranking movements Legend: ██ Increase in ranking ██ Decrease in ranking RV = Received votes ( ) = First-place votes
	Week																				
Poll	Pre	1	2	3	4	5	6	7	8	9	10	11	12	13	14	15	16	17	18	19	Final
AP	1 (30)	1 (44)	1 (49)	1 (51)	1 (35)	10	8	7	7	11	9	12	11	16	17	23	RV	RV	RV	RV	RV
Coaches	1 (15)	1 (21)	1 (21)	1 (25)	1 (19)	10	8	7	7	12	10	11	11	17	20	25	RV	RV	RV	RV	RV
