= Milos Uzan =

American basketball player (born 2002)

No. 7 – Maine Celtics
- Position: Point guard
- League: NBA G League

Personal information
- Born: December 26, 2002 (age 23) Las Vegas, Nevada, U.S.
- Listed height: 6 ft 3 in (1.91 m)
- Listed weight: 175 lb (79 kg)

Career information
- High school: Desert Pines (Las Vegas, Nevada)
- College: Oklahoma (2022–2024); Houston (2024–2026)
- NBA draft: 2026: undrafted
- Playing career: 2026–present

Career history
- 2026–present: Maine Celtics

Career highlights
- Second-team All-Big 12 (2025); Big 12 All-Freshman team (2023)
- Stats at NBA.com
- Stats at Basketball Reference

Milos James Uzan (born December 26, 2002) is an American professional basketball player for the Maine Celtics of the NBA G League. He played college basketball for the Oklahoma Sooners and Houston Cougars.

== Early life and high school ==
Coming out of high school, Uzan was rated as a four-star recruit and committed to play college basketball for the Oklahoma Sooners over other schools such as UNLV, Utah, California, Arizona State, USC, and Creighton.

== College career ==
=== Oklahoma ===
As a freshman in 2022–23, Uzan appeared in 32 games with 24 starts, where he averaged 7.6 points, three assists, 2.7 rebounds and shot 41% from three. In 2023–24, he was a team captain for the Sooners, where he started all 32 games, averaging nine points, 4.4 assists, and 3.4 rebounds per game. After the season, Uzan entered his name into the NCAA transfer portal.

=== Houston ===
Uzan transferred to play for the Houston Cougars. He missed three weeks of the preseason after breaking his nose. On January 18, 2025, Uzan dropped eight points and a team-high five assists in a win over UCF. On January 25, he notched 17 points, nine assists and nine rebounds while playing 41 minutes in a win over #12 Kansas, earning Big 12 Conference Player of the Week honors. On February 15, 2025, Uzan scored a game-high 19 points in a win over #13 Arizona. On March 15, 2025, Uzan scored a career-high 25 points to lead Houston over Arizona in the 2025 Big 12 men's basketball tournament championship game.

== Personal life ==
Uzan is the brother of former USC basketball player Julian Jacobs, and Providence basketball player Capri Uzan. Uzan's father, Mike is also the head coach at Desert Pines High School.

== Career statistics ==
Legend
GP	Games played	GS	Games started	MPG	Minutes per game
FG%	Field goal percentage	3P%	3-point field goal percentage	FT%	Free throw percentage
RPG	Rebounds per game	APG	Assists per game	SPG	Steals per game
BPG	Blocks per game	PPG	Points per game	**Bold**	Career high

=== College ===
Year	Team	GP	GS	MPG	FG%	3P%	FT%	RPG	APG	SPG	BPG	PPG
2022–23	Oklahoma	32	24	28.6	**.470**	.408	.765	2.7	3.0	.8	.2	7.6
2023–24	Oklahoma	32	32	31.7	.392	.296	.676	**3.4**	**4.4**	**1.2**	**.3**	9.0
2024–25	Houston	**40**	**40**	31.5	.453	**.428**	**.783**	3.1	4.3	.9	.1	**11.4**
2025–26	Houston	37	37	**32.9**	.380	.343	.741	2.7	4.0	1.0	.1	11.1
Career		141	133	31.3	.419	.364	.746	3.0	3.9	1.0	.2	9.9
