= Keshon Gilbert =

American basketball player (born 2003)

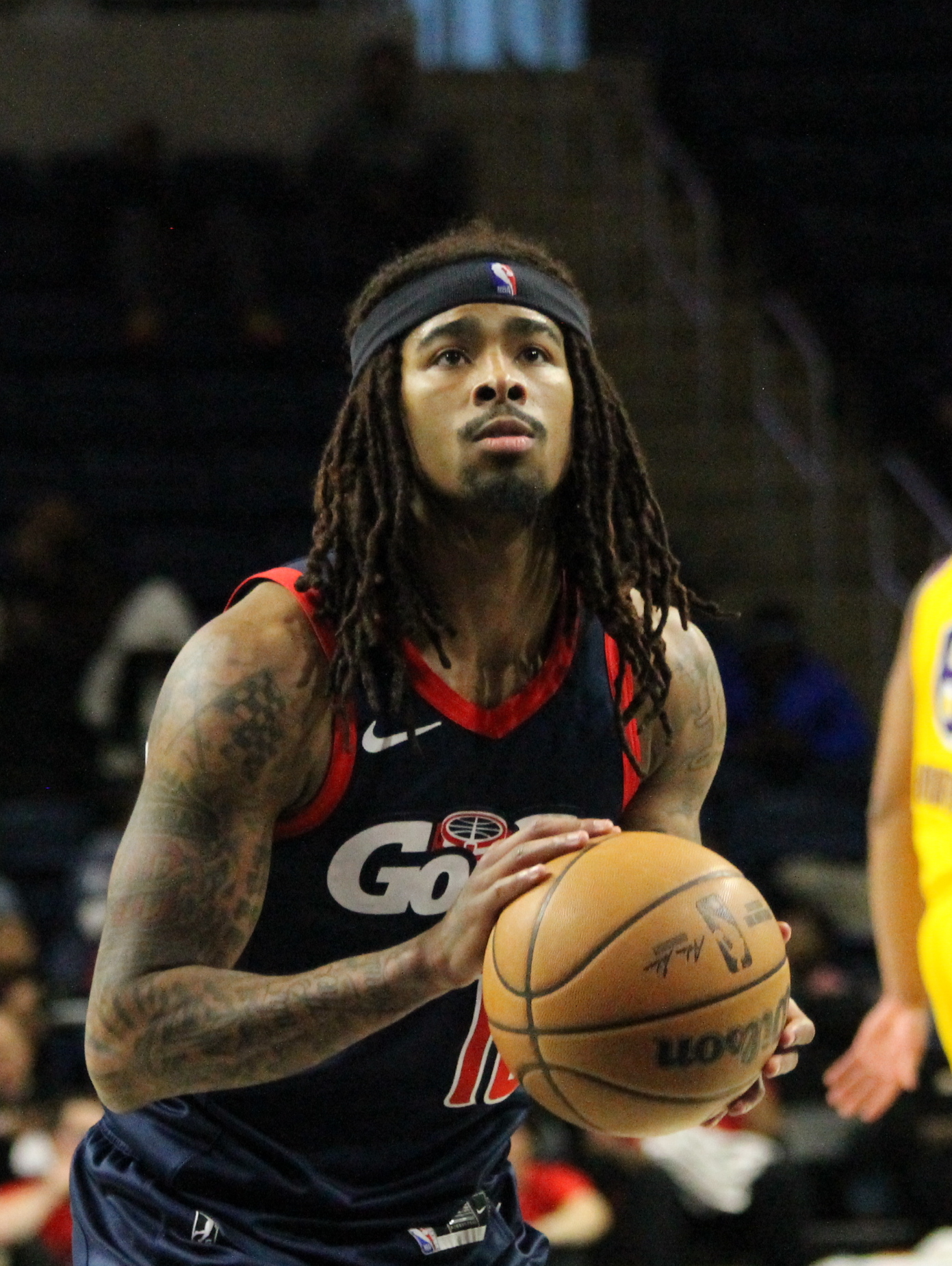
- Gilbert with the Capital City Go-Go in 2026

Free agent
- Position: Point guard

Personal information
- Born: June 30, 2003 (age 23) St. Louis, Missouri, U.S.
- Listed height: 6 ft 3 in (1.91 m)
- Listed weight: 200 lb (91 kg)

Career information
- High school: Durango (Las Vegas, Nevada); Vashon (St. Louis, Missouri)
- College: UNLV (2021–2023); Iowa State (2023–2025)
- NBA draft: 2025: undrafted
- Playing career: 2025–present

Career history
- 2025–2026: Capital City Go-Go
- 2026: Washington Wizards
- 2026: Atlanta Hawks
- 2026: →College Park Skyhawks

Career highlights
- NBA G League All-Rookie Team (2026); Second-team All-Big 12 (2024); Third-team All-Big 12 (2025); Big 12 All-Newcomer Team (2024)
- Stats at NBA.com
- Stats at Basketball Reference

Keshon Montae Gilbert (born June 30, 2003) is an American basketball player who last played for the Atlanta Hawks of the National Basketball Association (NBA). He played college basketball for the UNLV Runnin' Rebels and the Iowa State Cyclones.

== Early life and high school ==
Gilbert was born on June 30, 2003 in St. Louis, Missouri, the son of Koray Gilbert and Amelia Mclain. As a sophomore at Durango High School in Nevada, he averaged 15.3 points, 4.3 rebounds, and 2.8 assists on 54.5 percent shooting. As a senior at Vashon High School, Gilbert helped lead his school to a state championship. Coming out of high school, he was rated as a three-star recruit and committed to play college basketball for the UNLV Rebels over Nevada, Fresno State and Long Beach State.

== College career ==
=== UNLV ===
As a freshman with Rebels in 2021–22, Gilbert appeared in all 32 games for UNLV, where he averaged 2.6 points and 2.3 rebounds per game. On November 12, 2022, he recorded 23 points, two rebounds, and four steals in a win over Incarnate Word. In the 2022–23 season, Gilbert made 29 starts in 31 games played for the Runnin' Rebels and averaged 11.4 points, 3.8 rebounds, 3.2 assists and 1.7 steals in 27.5 minutes per game. After the season, Gilbert entered his name into the NCAA transfer portal.

=== Iowa State ===
Gilbert transferred to play for the Iowa State Cyclones. On December 7, 2023, he tied a career-high with 25 points in a win over rival Iowa. Gilbert was named the most outstanding player at the 2024 Big 12 tournament after leading the Cyclones to a Big 12 title. In his first season with the Cyclones he averaged 13.7 points, 4.4 rebounds, and 4.2 assists per game in 37 starts, leading the team in scoring. On November 26, 2024, Gilbert dropped 24 points in a win over Dayton. On December 4, he scored 24 points and added seven assists as he helped Iowa State take down #5 Marquette. At the conclusion of his senior year, Gilbert was named Third-team All-Big 12 (2025). After missing four of Iowa State's last seven games due to a groin injury, Gilbert was ruled out for the 2025 NCAA Tournament. He finished the season averaging 13.4 points and 4.1 assists per game.

== Professional career ==
At the close of his college career, Gilbert signed an exhibit 10 contract with the Washington Wizards and was invited to their training camp. He was waived on September 30. He was then added to the Wizards' G League affiliate, the Capital City Go-Go. On February 7, 2026, Gilbert signed a 10-day contract with the Wizards and made his NBA debut the same day.

On March 3, 2026, Gilbert signed a two-way contract with the Atlanta Hawks. He appeared in one game for Atlanta, the team's season finale against the Miami Heat, recording 11 points, nine assists, and one steal on 4-of-8 shooting. On April 21, Gilbert underwent core muscle surgery, ending his season.

== Career statistics ==
Legend
GP	Games played	GS	Games started	MPG	Minutes per game
FG%	Field goal percentage	3P%	3-point field goal percentage	FT%	Free throw percentage
RPG	Rebounds per game	APG	Assists per game	SPG	Steals per game
BPG	Blocks per game	PPG	Points per game	**Bold**	Career high

=== NBA ===
Year	Team	GP	GS	MPG	FG%	3P%	FT%	RPG	APG	SPG	BPG	PPG
2025–26	Washington	3	0	16.0	.250	.000	1.000	1.7	1.0	.7	1.3	2.0
2025–26	Atlanta	1	0	26.0	.500	.000	1.000	.0	9.0	1.0	.0	11.0
Career		4	0	18.5	.417	.000	1.000	1.3	3.0	.8	1.0	4.3

=== College ===
Year	Team	GP	GS	MPG	FG%	3P%	FT%	RPG	APG	SPG	BPG	PPG
2021–22	UNLV	32	4	14.3	.341	.280	.690	2.3	1.7	1.2	**.1**	2.6
2022–23	UNLV	31	29	27.5	.464	**.384**	**.779**	3.8	3.2	1.7	**.1**	11.4
2023–24	Iowa State	**37**	**37**	31.1	.438	.346	.728	**4.4**	**4.2**	**2.0**	**.1**	**13.7**
2024–25	Iowa State	29	28	**31.6**	**.484**	.333	.729	3.5	4.1	1.7	**.1**	13.4
Career		129	98	26.2	.450	.346	.737	3.5	3.3	1.7	.1	10.3
