= Zeke Mayo =

American basketball player (born 2002)

No. 5 – Mexico City Capitanes
- Position: Point guard / shooting guard
- League: NBA G League

Personal information
- Born: December 18, 2002 (age 23) Lawrence, Kansas, U.S.
- Listed height: 6 ft 4 in (1.93 m)
- Listed weight: 185 lb (84 kg)

Career information
- High school: Lawrence (Lawrence, Kansas)
- College: South Dakota State (2021–2024); Kansas (2024–2025)
- NBA draft: 2025: undrafted
- Playing career: 2025–present

Career history
- 2025–2026: Cleveland Charge
- 2026–present: Mexico City Capitanes

Career highlights
- Summit League Player of the Year (2024); 2× First-team All-Summit League (2023, 2024); Big 12 All-Newcomer Team (2025); Summit League All-Newcomer team (2022); Third-team All-Big 12 (2025)
- Stats at NBA.com
- Stats at Basketball Reference

Isaiah Jacquez Mayo (born December 18, 2002) is an American professional basketball player for the Mexico City Capitanes of the NBA G League. He played college basketball for the South Dakota State Jackrabbits and Kansas Jayhawks.

== High school career ==
Mayo attended Lawrence High School in Lawrence, Kansas. As a senior, he averaged 21.2 points and 6.8 rebounds per game. He was named the co-recipient of the DiRenna Award as the top player in the Kansas City area before committing to play college basketball at South Dakota State University.

== College career ==
As a freshman, Mayo made an immediate impact, starting in 21 games and averaging 9.6 points per game. Following the departures of Baylor Scheierman and Douglas Wilson, Mayo emerged as the team's leading scorer and had 41 points in a win against North Dakota State. He averaged 18.2 points, 6.2 rebounds and 3.4 assists per game as a sophomore and was named to the First Team All-Summit League. As a junior, he was named Summit League Player of the Year. He finished the season averaging 18.8 points, 5.7 rebounds, and 3.5 assists per game before entering the transfer portal and the 2024 NBA draft.

Mayo announced his commitment to Kansas on April 2, 2024. He averaged 14.6 points, 4.8 rebounds and 2.9 assists per game for the Jayhawks.

== Professional career ==
On June 27, 2025, it was reported that Mayo would join the Washington Wizards for 2025 NBA Summer League. On July 25, he signed with Ironi Kiryat Ata B.C. of the Israeli Basketball Premier League. In October, Mayo was added to the training camp roster of the Cleveland Cavaliers' NBA G League affiliate, the Cleveland Charge.

On September 8, 2026, Mayo was traded from Cleveland Charge to the Mexico City Capitanes in exchange for the rights to Reynan Dos Santos.

== Career statistics ==
Legend
GP	Games played	GS	Games started	MPG	Minutes per game
FG%	Field goal percentage	3P%	3-point field goal percentage	FT%	Free throw percentage
RPG	Rebounds per game	APG	Assists per game	SPG	Steals per game
BPG	Blocks per game	PPG	Points per game	**Bold**	Career high

=== College ===
Year	Team	GP	GS	MPG	FG%	3P%	FT%	RPG	APG	SPG	BPG	PPG
2021–22	South Dakota State	**35**	21	27.1	**.467**	.415	**.933**	2.9	2.1	.8	.0	9.6
2022–23	South Dakota State	32	32	35.7	.426	.369	.904	**6.2**	3.4	1.0	**.2**	18.2
2023–24	South Dakota State	**35**	**34**	**35.9**	.466	.391	.828	5.7	**3.5**	**1.1**	**.2**	**18.8**
2024–25	Kansas	34	32	31.7	.447	**.422**	.833	4.8	2.9	.7	.1	14.6
Career		136	119	32.6	.449	.397	.863	4.9	3.0	.9	.1	15.2
