= KJ Adams Jr. =

American basketball player (born 2002)

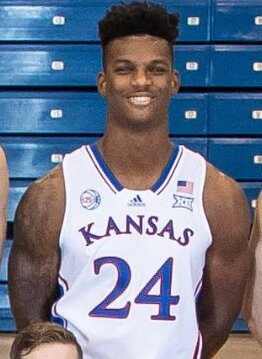
- Adams in 2022

Free agent
- Position: Power forward

Personal information
- Born: April 18, 2002 (age 24) Austin, Texas, U.S.
- Listed height: 6 ft 7 in (2.01 m)
- Listed weight: 235 lb (107 kg)

Career information
- High school: St. Andrew's Episcopal School (Austin, Texas); Westlake (Austin, Texas)
- College: Kansas (2021–2025)
- NBA draft: 2025: undrafted
- Playing career: 2026–present

Career highlights
- NCAA champion (2022); Big 12 Most Improved Player (2023)

Kevin Wynn "KJ" Adams Jr. (born April 18, 2002) is an American professional basketball player who is a free agent. He played college basketball for the Kansas Jayhawks.

== Early life and high school career ==
Adams grew up in Austin, Texas, and attended St. Andrew's Episcopal School as a freshman. He later transferred to nearby Westlake High School, where he played basketball and lacrosse. During his junior season, Adams averaged 22.6 points, 6.7 rebounds, and 3.5 assists per game. As a senior, he was named 6A All-State after averaging 25.0 points, 7.5 rebounds, and 4.1 assists per game.

=== Recruiting ===
A four-star recruit according to major recruiting services, Adams committed to play college basketball for Kansas over offers from Arkansas, Baylor, Georgetown, Iona, Iowa, Oklahoma, Texas, Texas Tech, and UCF after signing his national letter of intent on November 11, 2020.

College recruiting
Name	Hometown	School	Height	Weight	Commit date
KJ Adams Jr. PF	Austin, TX	Westlake (TX)	6 ft 6 in (1.98 m)	225 lb (102 kg)	Jul 31, 2020
KJ Adams Jr. PF	Recruit ratings: Rivals: 247Sports: ESPN: (86)				
Overall recruit ranking: Rivals: 95 247Sports: 85 ESPN: 47
Note: In many cases, Scout, Rivals, 247Sports, On3, and ESPN may conflict in their listings of height and weight.; In these cases, the average was taken. ESPN grades are on a 100-point scale.; Sources: "Kansas 2021 Basketball Commitments". Rivals.; "2021 Kansas Jayhawks Recruiting Class". ESPN.; "2021 Team Ranking". Rivals.

== College career ==
Adams played in 37 of Kansas' 40 games during his freshman season and averaged 1.0 points, 0.8 rebounds, and 0.3 assists per game. During the 2022 national championship game against North Carolina, he played three total minutes in Kansas' 72–69 victory and was a defensive substitution for the final possession of the game. Adams entered his sophomore season as Kansas' starting center, and finished the season being named the Big 12 Most Improved Player after averaging 10.6 points, 4.3 rebounds, and 1.9 assists per game. In his junior season, he averaged 12.6 points, 4.6 rebounds, and 3.1 assists per game. During the 2025 NCAA tournament in his senior season, Adams sustained a torn Achilles tendon in a 79–72 loss to Arkansas on March 20, 2025. He finished the season averaging 9.4 points, 5.0 rebounds, and 2.5 assists per game.

== Professional career ==
Adams went undrafted in the 2025 NBA draft. He would later join the Golden State Warriors for the 2026 NBA Summer League.

== Coaching career ==
Adams joined the Kansas coaching staff as an assistant video coordinator for the 2025–2026 season after sustaining a torn Achilles tendon during the 2025 NCAA tournament.

== Personal life ==
Adams is the son of Kevin and Yvonne. He has two sisters. His father played football at New Mexico, and his mother was a two-year basketball starter at Texas A&M University and led the team in scoring in 1989–90 and 1990–1991. His sister, Brittany, was an all-conference volleyball player at Southern Methodist University.

== Career statistics ==
Legend
GP	Games played	GS	Games started	MPG	Minutes per game
FG%	Field goal percentage	3P%	3-point field goal percentage	FT%	Free throw percentage
RPG	Rebounds per game	APG	Assists per game	SPG	Steals per game
BPG	Blocks per game	PPG	Points per game	**Bold**	Career high

=== College ===
Year	Team	GP	GS	MPG	FG%	3P%	FT%	RPG	APG	SPG	BPG	PPG
2021–22	Kansas	**37**	1	4.8	.520	.000	.600	.8	.3	.1	.2	1.0
2022–23	Kansas	36	**36**	27.4	**.622**	.000	.607	4.3	1.9	.8	**.8**	10.6
2023–24	Kansas	34	32	**33.5**	.601	.000	.600	4.6	**3.1**	**1.1**	.6	**12.6**
2024–25	Kansas	31	29	30.0	.540	.000	**.725**	**5.0**	2.5	.9	**.8**	9.4
Career		138	98	23.4	.588	.000	.633	3.6	1.9	.7	.6	8.2
