= Coleman Hawkins (basketball) =

American basketball player (born 2001)

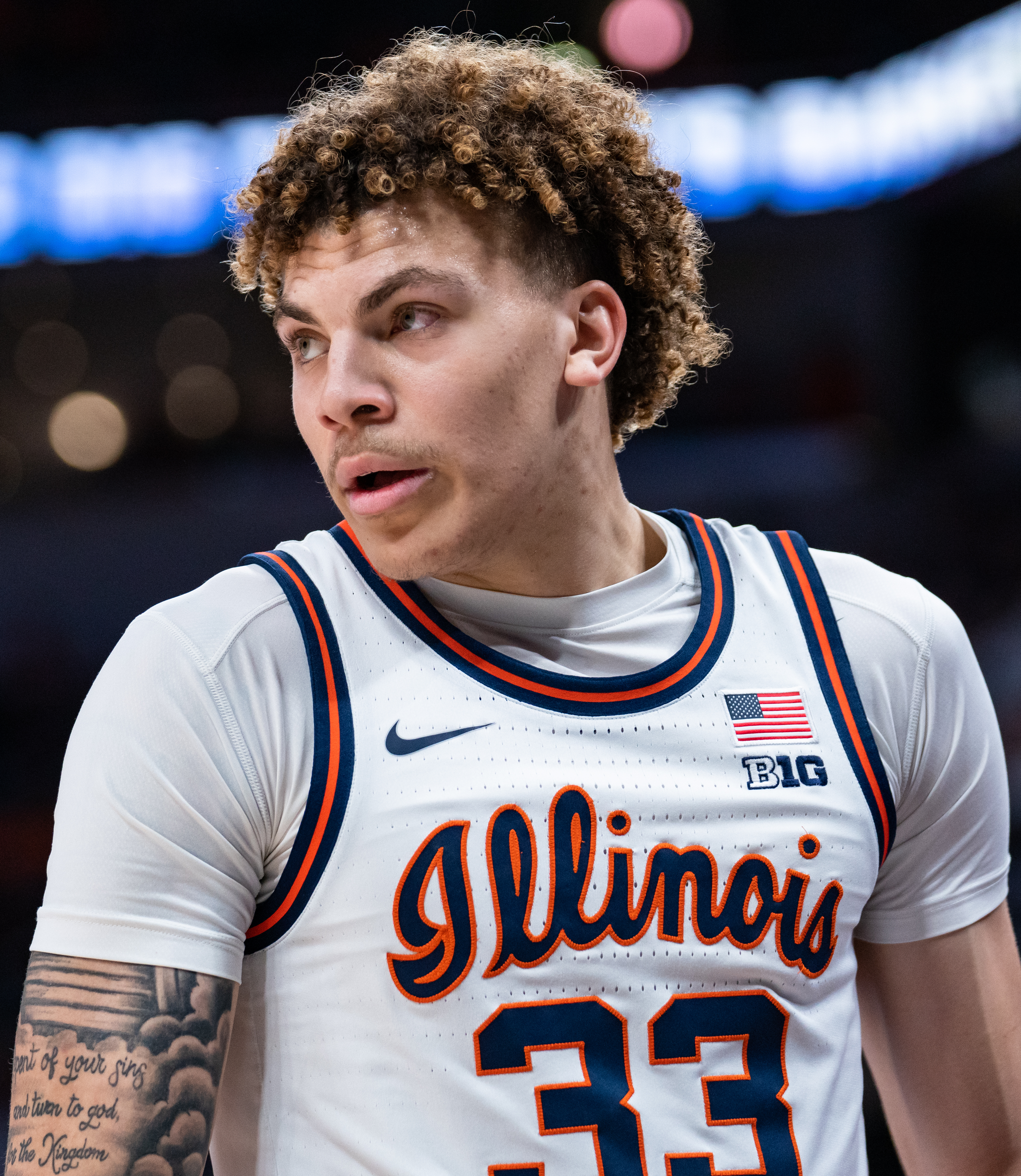
- Hawkins with Illinois in 2022

No. 33 – Grand Rapids Gold
- Position: Power forward / small forward
- League: NBA G League

Personal information
- Born: December 10, 2001 (age 24) Sacramento, California, U.S.
- Listed height: 6 ft 10 in (2.08 m)
- Listed weight: 230 lb (104 kg)

Career information
- High school: Antelope (Antelope, California); Prolific Prep (Napa, California)
- College: Illinois (2020–2024); Kansas State (2024–2025)
- NBA draft: 2025: undrafted
- Playing career: 2025–present

Career history
- 2025–present: Grand Rapids Gold

Career highlights
- Third-team All-Big Ten – Media (2024); Third-team All-Big 12 (2025)
- Stats at NBA.com
- Stats at Basketball Reference

Coleman Hawkins (born December 10, 2001) is an American basketball player for the Grand Rapids Gold of the NBA G League. He played college basketball for the Illinois Fighting Illini and the Kansas State Wildcats.

== Early life and high school career ==
Hawkins grew up in Antelope, California and initially attended Antelope High School. He transferred to Prolific Prep in Napa, California after his sophomore year. As a senior, he averaged 12.5 points, 4.5 rebounds, and 6.5 assists per game, leading his team to a 31–3 record. Hawkins was rated a three-star recruit and committed to playing college basketball for Illinois over offers from Rutgers, San Diego State, Marquette, and USC.

== College career ==
=== Illinois ===
Hawkins played in 25 games, all coming off the bench, during his freshman season at Illinois and averaged 1.4 points per game. He played in all 33 of the Fighting Illini's games with 14 starts during his sophomore season, averaging 5.9 points and 4.3 rebounds per game. Hawkins entered his junior season as Illinois's starting power forward. On November 29, 2022, Hawkins recorded a 15-point, 10-assist, 10-rebound triple-double in a 73–44 win against Syracuse. This was the fifth triple-double by any player in Illinois history. He averaged 9.9 points and a team-high 6.3 rebounds per game on the season. After the end of the season, Hawkins declared for the 2023 NBA draft while maintaining his eligibility. He later withdrew from the draft and returned to Illinois for his senior season.

=== Kansas State ===
Following his senior season, Hawkins again declared for the draft, forgoing his fifth year of eligibility he received thanks to the COVID pandemic. He later withdrew from the draft, while still intending to leave Illinois. On June 14, 2024, it was announced that Hawkins would be transferring to Kansas State for his fifth and final year. In his final year of eligibility, Hawkins was named Third-team All-Big 12 (2025).

== Professional career ==
In 2025, Hawkins played for the Golden State Warriors in the NBA Summer League. He signed an Exhibit 10 deal with the Denver Nuggets on October 8 but was waived a day later. Hawkins ultimately landed with the Grand Rapids Gold of the NBA G League.

== Career statistics ==
Legend
GP	Games played	GS	Games started	MPG	Minutes per game
FG%	Field goal percentage	3P%	3-point field goal percentage	FT%	Free throw percentage
RPG	Rebounds per game	APG	Assists per game	SPG	Steals per game
BPG	Blocks per game	PPG	Points per game	**Bold**	Career high

=== College ===
Year	Team	GP	GS	MPG	FG%	3P%	FT%	RPG	APG	SPG	BPG	PPG
2020–21	Illinois	25	0	6.3	.345	.231	.684	.8	.4	.1	.4	1.4
2021–22	Illinois	33	14	19.0	.442	.292	.650	4.3	1.5	.8	.5	5.9
2022–23	Illinois	33	33	**32.5**	.441	.280	.614	**6.3**	**3.0**	1.1	**1.2**	9.9
2023–24	Illinois	**35**	**35**	31.6	**.451**	**.369**	**.792**	6.1	2.7	**1.5**	1.1	**12.1**
2024–25	Kansas State	30	30	33.6	.401	.303	.577	6.9	4.3	1.8	1.3	10.7
Career		156	112	25.4	.431	.315	.669	5.1	2.5	1.1	.9	8.3

== Personal life ==
Hawkins's father, Rodney Hawkins, played college basketball at San Diego State. His great uncle, Tom Hawkins, was an All-American basketball player at Notre Dame and played in the National Basketball Association (NBA) for ten seasons. Hawkins is the youngest of nine children and three of his older sisters played basketball in college.
