= Joson Sanon =

American basketball player (born 2005)

No. 3 – West Virginia Mountaineers
- Position: Shooting guard
- Conference: Big 12 Conference

Personal information
- Born: December 27, 2005 (age 20) Brockton, Massachusetts, U.S.
- Listed height: 6 ft 5 in (1.96 m)
- Listed weight: 195 lb (88 kg)

Career information
- High school: B.M.C. Durfee (Fall River, Massachusetts); Vermont Academy (Saxtons River, Vermont)
- College: Arizona State (2024–2025); St. John's (2025–2026); West Virginia (2026–present)

Joson Sanon (born December 27, 2005) is an American college basketball player for the West Virginia Mountaineers of the Big 12 Conference. He previously played for the Arizona State Sun Devils and St. John's Red Storm.

== Early life and high school ==
Sanon was born in Brockton, Massachusetts to parents who immigrated to the United States from Haiti and grew up in Fall River, Massachusetts. He initially attended B.M.C. Durfee High School. Sanon transferred to Vermont Academy in Saxtons River, Vermont after his freshman year.

Sanon was rated a five-star recruit in the 2025 class. He initially committed to play college basketball at Arizona over offers from Kentucky, Kansas, UConn, Louisville, and Indiana. Sanon also reclassified to the 2024 class. Sanon later flipped his commitment to rival Arizona State.

== College career ==
Sanon enrolled at Arizona State University in July 2024 in order to take part in the Sun Devils' summer practices. On March 26, 2025, he announced his impending transfer to St. John's, to play for head coach Rick Pitino, and the following year announced a transfer to West Virginia.
