= Tamin Lipsey =

American basketball player (born 2003)

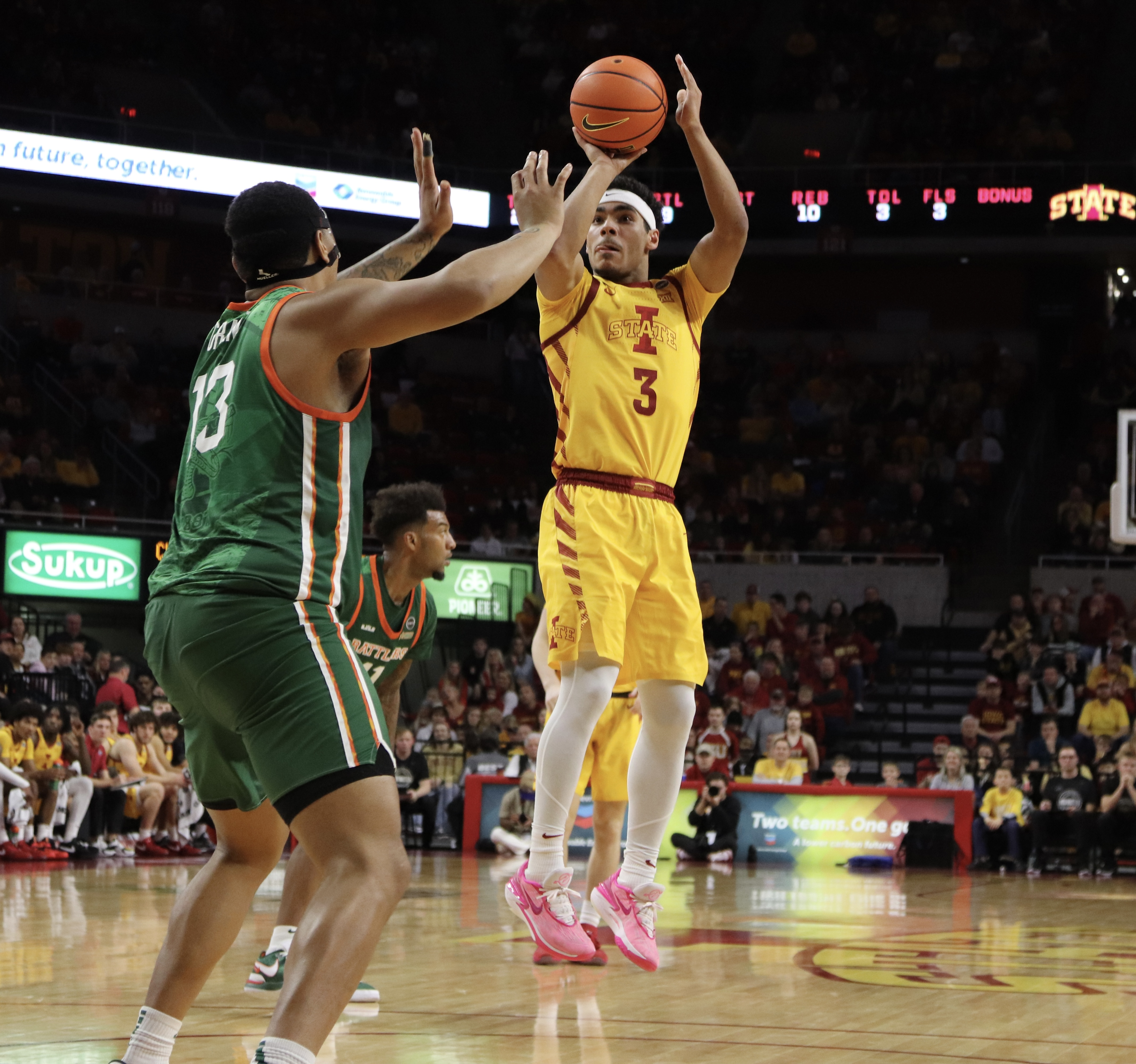
- Lipsey with Iowa State in 2023

No. 3 – Iowa State Cyclones
- Position: Point guard
- League: Big 12

Personal information
- Born: June 25, 2003 (age 23)
- Listed height: 6 ft 1 in (1.85 m)
- Listed weight: 200 lb (91 kg)

Career information
- High school: Ames (Ames, Iowa)
- College: Iowa State (2022–present)

Career highlights
- First-team All-Big 12 (2024); Second-team All-Big 12 (2026); Third-team All-Big 12 (2025); 3× Big 12 All-Defensive team (2024–2026); Big 12 All-Freshman team (2023); Academic All-American of the Year (2026); 2x First-team Academic All-American (2025, 2026); Second-team Academic All-American (2024); Iowa Mr. Basketball (2022)
Medals
Men's basketball
Representing United States
FIBA Americas U16 Championship
Gold medal – first place	2019 Brazil	Team

Tamin Lipsey (born June 25, 2003) is an American college basketball player for the Iowa State Cyclones of the Big 12 Conference.

== High school career ==
Lipsey, from Ames, Iowa, played high school basketball for Ames High School. The point guard averaged 16.3 points, 5.3 assists and 2.2 steals per game for his career, earning Iowa Mr. Basketball and Gatorade state Player of the Year honors as a senior. In the 2022 season, Lipsey's senior year, he led Ames High to a state championship, its ninth and most among Iowa high schools. Drawing early attention of North Carolina, Michigan and others, in 2021 Lipsey, a 3-star recruit, committed to his hometown Iowa State Cyclones over offers from Minnesota and Nebraska.

== College career ==
Before Lipsey arrived at Iowa State, Big 12 Conference Freshman of the Year Tyrese Hunter opted to transfer, opening the door for Lipsey to become the Cyclones' starting point guard as a freshman. He averaged 7.3 points, 4 rebounds and 4.4 assists per game in 33 starts. He was effective at running the team's offense and as a defensive player, but struggled with his shot, shooting only 20% from three-point range on the season. At the close of the year, Lipsey was named to the Big 12 All-Freshman team.

In the off-season before his sophomore year, Lipsey worked diligently to improve his three-point shooting. The work paid off as he was able to increase his three-point shooting percentage to a solid 39.1% for his second year. He continued to stand out defensively, and on December 10, 2023, Lipsey broke the Iowa State single-game steals record, recording 8 in a win over Prairie View A&M. At the end of the regular season, Lipsey was named first-team All-Big 12 and a member of the conference all-defensive team. He also garnered national attention as an AP honorable mention All-American, a second-team academic All-American, and as a finalist for the Naismith Defensive Player of the Year Award. During a game against Houston in the 24-25 season, he broke the Iowa State all-time steals record.

After his sophomore season, Lipsey had shoulder surgery to repair an injury suffered in a January, 2024 game against BYU. At the conclusion of his junior year, Lipsey was named Third-team All-Big 12 (2025). He sprained his right MCL in September 2025. He was a 2025 first-team Academic All-America selection. He earned 2026 Men's Basketball Academic All-America Team Member of the Year recognition.

== National team career ==
Lipsey was a member of the U.S. junior national team, who won gold at the FIBA Americas Under-16 Championship in Brazil.

== Career statistics ==
Legend
GP	Games played	GS	Games started	MPG	Minutes per game
FG%	Field goal percentage	3P%	3-point field goal percentage	FT%	Free throw percentage
RPG	Rebounds per game	APG	Assists per game	SPG	Steals per game
BPG	Blocks per game	PPG	Points per game	**Bold**	Career high

=== College ===
Year	Team	GP	GS	MPG	FG%	3P%	FT%	RPG	APG	SPG	BPG	PPG
2022–23	Iowa State	33	33	29.5	.482	.200	**.759**	4.0	4.4	2.2	.1	7.3
2023–24	Iowa State	**36**	**36**	**31.4**	.428	**.391**	.705	**4.6**	4.9	**2.7**	.1	12.4
2024–25	Iowa State	34	34	31.0	**.484**	.331	.758	2.6	3.1	2.0	**.2**	10.6
2025–26	Iowa State	34	34	**31.4**	.459	.316	.656	3.9	**5.1**	2.3	0	**13.5**
Career		137	137	30.8	.463	.310	.720	3.8	4.3	2.3	.1	10.9
