= UCF Knights men's basketball statistical leaders =

The UCF Knights men's basketball statistical leaders are individual statistical leaders of the UCF Knights men's basketball program in various categories, including points, three-pointers, assists, blocks, rebounds, and steals. Within those areas, the lists identify single-game, single-season, and career leaders. The Knights represent the University of Central Florida in the NCAA Division I Big 12 Conference.

UCF began competing in intercollegiate basketball in 1969, initially as a club sport before upgrading to full varsity status in 1970–71. The Knights began their varsity existence as NCAA College Division members. When the NCAA split the College Division in 1973, creating today's Divisions II and III, UCF became a Division II member. The Knights did not move to D-I until the 1984–85 season. By that time, the NCAA had resumed officially recording assists as a statistic in Division I; after recording that statistic for two seasons in the early 1950s, it stopped doing so until 1983–84. Blocks and steals were not officially recorded in D-I until the 1985–86 season. UCF's record books cover the entire history of UCF men's basketball, even in seasons in which the NCAA did not officially record the relevant statistics. These lists are updated through the end of the 2020–21 season.

== Scoring ==
Career
Rk	Player	Points	Seasons
1	Bo Clark	2,866	1975–76 1976–77 1978–79 1979–80
2	Mike Clark	2,085	1969–70 1970–71 1971–72 1972–73
3	Jermaine Taylor	1,979	2005–06 2006–07 2007–08 2008–09
4	Jerry Prather	1,778	1974–75 1975–76 1976–77 1977–78
5	Ken Leeks	1,763	1988–89 1989–90 1990–91 1991–92
6	Keith Clanton	1,718	2009–10 2010–11 2011–12 2012–13
7	BJ Taylor	1,618	2014–15 2016–17 2017–18 2018–19
8	Darius Johnson	1,586	2021–22 2022–23 2023–24 2024–25
9	Isaiah Sykes	1,545	2010–11 2011–12 2012–13 2013–14
10	Darryl Davis	1,540	1991–92 1992–93 1993–94 1994–95

Season
Rk	Player	Points	Season
1	Jermaine Taylor	812	2008–09
2	Bo Clark	806	1976–77
3	Bo Clark	751	1979–80
4	Bo Clark	727	1978–79
5	Mike Clark	718	1970–71
6	Jermaine Taylor	646	2007–08
7	Darius Johnson	644	2024–25
8	Bennie Shaw	634	1975–76
9	Keyshawn Hall	620	2024–25
10	Mike Clark	606	1971–72

Single game
Rk	Player	Points	Season	Opponent
1	Bo Clark	70	1976–77	Fla. Memorial
2	Bo Clark	51	1978–79	Florida Tech
3	Bo Clark	49	1979–80	Florida Tech
4	Jermaine Taylor	45	2008–09	Rice
5	Bo Clark	44	1978–79	Blackburn
	Bo Clark	44	1978–79	Flagler
7	Mike Clark	43	1971–72	Atlanta Baptist
8	Darius Johnson	42	2024–25	Villanova
	Mark Jones	42	1997–98	St. Thomas
	Bennie Shaw	42	1974–75	Florida A&M

== Rebounds ==
Career
Rk	Player	Rebounds	Seasons
1	Keith Clanton	1,000	2009–10 2010–11 2011–12 2012–13
2	Ken Leeks	942	1988–89 1989–90 1990–91 1991–92
3	Tacko Fall	887	2015–16 2016–17 2017–18 2018–19
4	Jerry Prather	849	1974–75 1975–76 1976–77 1977–78
5	Isaiah Sykes	698	2010–11 2011–12 2012–13 2013–14
6	Willy Belotte	698	1972–73 1973–74 1974–75 1975–76
7	Paul Reed	685	1999–00 2000–01 2001–02
8	A.J. Davis	633	2015–16 2016–17 2017–18
9	Dan Faison	626	1982–83 1983–84 1984–85
10	Mario Lovett	608	1996–97 1997–98 1998–99 1999–00 2000–01

Season
Rk	Player	Rebounds	Season
1	Ed Fluitt	364	1971–72
2	Tacko Fall	343	2016–17
3	Ruben Cotton	320	1979–80
4	Dean Rossin	299	1980–81
5	Ken Leeks	268	1990–91
6	Keith Clanton	266	2011–12
7	Keith Clanton	263	2012–13
8	Wil Nix	258	1978–79
9	Keith Clanton	254	2010–11
10	Jamichael Stillwell	253	2025–26

Single game
Rk	Player	Rebounds	Season	Opponent
1	Ron Thornton	23	1981–82	Edward Waters
	Ed Fluitt	23	1971–72	Embry-Riddle
3	Ed Fluitt	21	1971–72	Hawthorne
4	Tacko Fall	20	2018–19	SMU
	Paul Reed	20	2001–02	Marist
	David Lewis	20	1975–76	Eckerd
	Jim Flanagan	20	1970–71	Florida Bible
	Don Mathis	20	1970–71	Florida Bible
9	Ibrahima Diallo	19	2023–24	BYU
	Brad Traina	19	1996–97	Centenary
	Howard Porter	19	1995–96	SE Louisiana
	Dean Rossin	19	1980–81	St. Michael's
	Ruben Cotton	19	1979–80	Furman
	John Smith	19	1972–73	Palm Beach Atlantic

== Assists ==
Career
Rk	Player	Assists	Seasons
1	Sinua Phillips	531	1990–91 1991–92 1992–93 1993–94
2	Cory Perry	512	1996–97 1997–98 1998–99 1999–00
3	Darius Johnson	478	2021–22 2022–23 2023–24 2024–25
4	Al Miller	397	1999–00 2000–01 2001–02 2002–03
5	Mike Clark	361	1969–70 1970–71 1971–72 1972–73
6	Isaiah Sykes	336	2010–11 2011–12 2012–13 2013–14
7	BJ Taylor	324	2014–15 2016–17 2017–18 2018–19
8	Mike O’Donnell	319	2005–06 2006–07 2007–08
9	Bo Clark	302	1975–76 1976–77 1978–79 1979–80
10	Darryl Davis	294	1991–92 1992–93 1993–94 1994–95

Season
Rk	Player	Assists	Season
1	Themus Fulks	222	2025–26
2	Sinua Phillips	183	1991–92
3	Darius Johnson	160	2024–25
4	Mike Clark	153	1971–72
5	Al Miller	149	2000–01
6	Cory Perry	146	1998–99
7	Cleveland Jackson	145	1978–79
8	Cory Perry	143	1997–98
9	Terrell Allen	142	2018–19
10	Isaiah Sykes	141	2012–13

Single game
Rk	Player	Assists	Season	Opponent
1	Kingsley Edwards	14	2004–05	Troy
	Cory Perry	14	1998–99	Florida Atlantic
3	Themus Fulks	13	2025–26	Quinnipiac
	Brandon Goodwin	13	2014–15	Tulane
	A.J. Rompza	13	2009–10	Marshall
	Mike Clark	13	1972–73	USF
	Mike Clark	13	1972–73	Embry-Riddle
8	Themus Fulks	12	2025–26	Kansas State
	Themus Fulks	12	2025–26	Cincinnati
	Themus Fulks	12	2025–26	Florida Atlantic
	Cory Perry	12	1997–98	Florida Atlantic
	Anthony Haynes	12	1989–90	Liberty
	Cleveland Jackson	12	1977–78	Fla. Southern
	Mike Clark	12	1972–73	New Hampshire
	Mike Lalone	12	1970–71	Patrick AFB

== Steals ==
Career
Rk	Player	Steals	Seasons
1	Jerry Prather	290	1974–75 1975–76 1976–77 1977–78
2	Darius Johnson	241	2021–22 2022–23 2023–24 2024–25
3	Cory Perry	205	1996–97 1997–98 1998–99 1999–00
4	Isaiah Sykes	183	2010–11 2011–12 2012–13 2013–14
5	Ed Smith	181	1970–71 1971–72 1972–73 1973–74
6	Sinua Phillips	179	1990–91 1991–92 1992–93 1993–94
7	Calvin Lingelbach	161	1973–74 1974–75 1975–76 1976–77
8	Ruben Cotton	149	1979–80 1980–81
9	Cleveland Jackson	142	1977–78 1978–79
10	Mike O’Donnell	140	2005–06 2006–07 2007–08

Season
Rk	Player	Steals	Season
1	Jerry Prather	110	1977–78
2	Ruben Cotton	97	1979–80
3	Ed Smith	84	1971–72
4	Darius Johnson	83	2024–25
5	Jerry Prather	79	1976–77
6	Eddie Rhodes	78	1981–82
7	Cleveland Jackson	73	1978–79
	Darius Johnson	73	2023–24
9	Isaiah Sykes	72	2012–13
10	Gary Johnson	71	2004–05

Single game
Rk	Player	Steals	Season	Opponent
1	Ruben Cotton	11	1979–80	Florida Tech
	Jerry Prather	11	1977–78	Lawrence
3	Isaiah Sykes	9	2012–13	Georgia SW
4	Bo Clark	8	1978–79	Blackburn
	Cleveland Jackson	8	1978–79	Blackburn
	Jerry Prather	8	1977–78	Edward Waters
7	Darius Johnson	7	2024–25	West Virginia
	Darius Johnson	7	2024–25	California Baptist
	Darius Johnson	7	2022–23	Wichita State
	Marius Boyd	7	2002–03	Jacksonville
	Ruben Cotton	7	1979–80	Fla. Memorial
	Bo Clark	7	1978–79	St. Leo
	Jerry Prather	7	1977–78	Florida Memorial
	Pete Haas	7	1973–74	Clearwater Christian
	Arnett Hall	7	1972–73	Elmhurst

== Blocks ==
Career
Rk	Player	Blocks	Seasons
1	Tacko Fall	280	2015–16 2016–17 2017–18 2018–19
2	Keith Clanton	227	2009–10 2010–11 2011–12 2012–13
3	Ken Leeks	141	1988–89 1989–90 1990–91 1991–92
4	Paul Reed	127	1999–00 2000–01 2001–02
5	Isaac McKinnon	106	1979–80 1980–81 1981–82 1982–83 1983–84
6	Staphon Blair	99	2012–13 2013–14 2014–15 2015–16
7	Chad Brown	97	2015–16 2016–17 2017–18 2018–19
8	John Friday	94	1984–85 1986–87
9	Josh Bodden	88	2000–01 2001–02 2002–03 2003–04
	Moustapha Thiam	88	2024–25

Season
Rk	Player	Blocks	Season
1	Tacko Fall	94	2016–17
2	Moustapha Thiam	88	2024–25
3	Tacko Fall	85	2018–19
4	John Friday	74	1986–87
5	Tacko Fall	70	2015–16
6	Keith Clanton	63	2012–13
7	Keith Clanton	60	2010–11
8	Taylor Hendricks	59	2022–23
	Keith Clanton	59	2011–12
	Tom Herzog	59	2010–11
	Isaac McKinnon	59	1983–84

Single game
Rk	Player	Blocks	Season	Opponent
1	Moustapha Thiam	8	2024–25	Kansas State
	Tom Herzog	8	2010–11	Bethune-Cookman
	Keith Clanton	8	2010–11	SE Louisiana
	Tony Davis	8	2007–08	USF
5	Staphon Blair	7	2014–15	USC Upstate
	Keith Clanton	7	2012–13	Southern Miss
	John Friday	7	1986–87	Delaware State
	John Friday	7	1986–87	Western Illinois
9	Moustapha Thiam	6	2024–25	Tarleton State
	Moustapha Thiam	6	2024–25	Texas A&M
	Tacko Fall	6	2018–19	Missouri
	Tacko Fall	6	2016–17	TCU
	Tacko Fall	6	2015–16	Florida Atlantic
	Keith Clanton	6	2011–12	Saint Thomas
	Anthony Williams	6	2004–05	South Dakota St.
	Paul Reed	6	2001–02	Stetson
	Dean Rossin	6	1980–81	Florida Southern
