= List of UCF Knights men's basketball seasons =

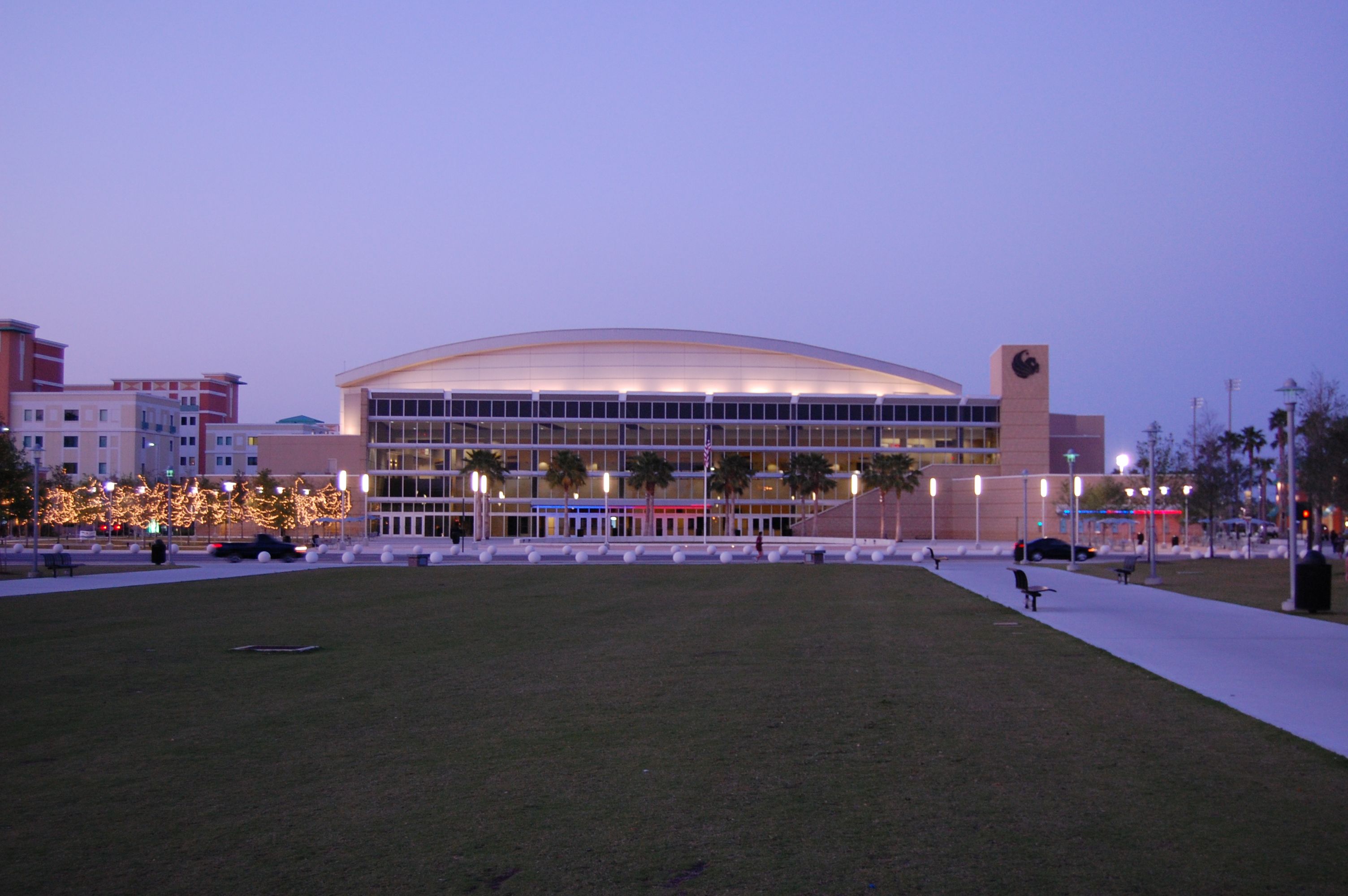
CFE Arena, the Knights' home court

This is a list of seasons completed by the UCF Knights basketball team since the team's formation in 1969. Since that season, the Knights have played over 1,100 regular-season games, winning five conference tournament championships and seven regular season championships. The Knights are a member of the American Athletic Conference (The American), and their current head coach is Johnny Dawkins, who is in his third year with the team. The Knights play their home games at CFE Arena, which is located on the main campus of UCF in Orlando, Florida.

The University of Central Florida first fielded a varsity basketball team in the fall of 1969 under Torchy Clark. Clark completed 14 seasons as the Knights' head coach, amassing a 274–89 record. Clark did not have a single losing season during his 14-year career, and led the Knights to the Division II Final Four in 1978. His son, Bo Clark, holds the UCF records for career points (2,886) and points in a game (70). UCF has advanced to the NCAA tournament four times (94, 96, 04, 05), all under coach Kirk Speraw. The Knights were the 2005 Atlantic Sun Conference regular season and tournament champions, their last season in the league.

On December 1, 2010, the Knights upset the #16 Florida Gators 57–54, for the biggest win in program history, giving the Knights their first victory over a top 20 opponent as well as their first victory over the Gators. Following a 10–0 start to the 2010–11 season under first-year coach Donnie Jones, the Knights were nationally ranked for the first time in program history. At the time, UCF was one of nine unbeaten teams, and one of only four schools to be ranked in the BCS standings and the AP men's basketball poll. The Knights continued their rise in 2011, when they upset the defending national champions and then-ranked #4 Connecticut Huskies.

== Seasons ==
Record table
Season	Coach	Overall	Conference	Standing	Postseason
Torchy Clark (Independent) (1969–1975)
1969–70	Torchy Clark	11–3	–		
1970–71	Torchy Clark	17–9	–		
1971–72	Torchy Clark	20–6	–		
1972–73	Torchy Clark	19–7	–		
1973–74	Torchy Clark	16–8	–		
1974–75	Torchy Clark	14–10	–		
Torchy Clark (Sunshine State Conference) (1975–1983)
1975–76	Torchy Clark	20–5	10–0	1st	NCAA Division II first round
1976–77	Torchy Clark	24–4	8–2	1st	NCAA Division II Sweet Sixteen
1977–78	Torchy Clark	26–4	10–0	1st	NCAA Division II Final Four
1978–79	Torchy Clark	19–7	7–3	2nd	
1979–80	Torchy Clark	25–4	8–2	2nd	NCAA Division II Sweet Sixteen
1980–81	Torchy Clark	23–5	9–1	1st	NCAA Division II Sweet Sixteen
1981–82	Torchy Clark	21–8	9–3	1st	NCAA Division II first round
1982–83	Torchy Clark	19–9	10–2	2nd	
Torchy Clark:		274–89	71–13		
Chuck Machock (Sunshine State Conference) (1983–1984)
1983–84	Chuck Machock	15–13	9–3	1st	
Chuck Machock (Independent) (1984–1985)
1984–85	Chuck Machock	10–18	–		
Chuck Machock:		25–31	9–3		
Phil Carter (Independent) (1985–1989)
1985–86	Phil Carter	6–22	–		
1986–87	Phil Carter	12–15	–		
1987–88	Phil Carter	9–19	–		
1988–89	Phil Carter	7–20	–		
Phil Carter:		34–76	–		
Joe Dean, Jr. (Independent) (1989–1990)
1989–90	Joe Dean, Jr.	7–21	–		
Joe Dean, Jr. (American South Conference) (1990–1991)
1990–91	Joe Dean, Jr.	10–17	3–9	6th	
Joe Dean, Jr. (Sun Belt Conference) (1991–1992)
1991–92	Joe Dean, Jr.	10–18	3–13	10th	
Joe Dean, Jr. (Atlantic Sun Conference) (1992–1993)
1992–93	Joe Dean, Jr.	10–17	–		
Joe Dean, Jr.:		37–73	6–22		
Kirk Speraw (Atlantic Sun Conference) (1993–2005)
1993–94	Kirk Speraw	21–9	11–5	2nd	NCAA Division I first round
1994–95	Kirk Speraw	11–16	7–9	T–5th	
1995–96	Kirk Speraw	11–19	6–10	T–3rd (East)	NCAA Division I first round
1996–97	Kirk Speraw	7–19	4–12	6th (East)	
1997–98	Kirk Speraw	17–11	11–5	3rd (East)	
1998–99	Kirk Speraw	19–10	13–3	2nd	
1999–00	Kirk Speraw	14–18	10–8	T–5th	
2000–01	Kirk Speraw	8–23	3–15	10th	
2001–02	Kirk Speraw	17–12	12–8	T–4th	
2002–03	Kirk Speraw	21–11	11–5	3rd (South)	
2003–04	Kirk Speraw	25–6	17–3	2nd	NCAA Division I first round
2004–05	Kirk Speraw	24–9	13–7	T–1st	NCAA Division I first round
Kirk Speraw (Conference USA) (2005–2010)
2005–06	Kirk Speraw	14–15	7–7	5th	
2006–07	Kirk Speraw	22–9	11–5	2nd	
2007–08	Kirk Speraw	16–15	9–7	4th	
2008–09	Kirk Speraw	17–14^{[Note A]}	7–9	6th	
2009–10	Kirk Speraw	15–17^{[Note A]}	6–10	9th	
Kirk Speraw:		247–233^{[Note A]}	145–128		
Donnie Jones (Conference USA) (2010–2013)
2010–11	Donnie Jones	21–12^{[Note A]}	6–10	9th	CBI Semifinal
2011–12	Donnie Jones	22–11	10–6	4th	NIT first round
2012–13	Donnie Jones	20–11	9–7	3rd	
Donnie Jones (American Athletic Conference) (2013–2016)
2013–14	Donnie Jones	13–18	4–14	8th	
2014–15	Donnie Jones	12–18	5–13	9th	
2015–16	Donnie Jones	12–18	6–12	8th	
Donnie Jones:		79–88^{[Note A]}	34–62		
Johnny Dawkins (American Athletic Conference) (2016–2023)
2016–17	Johnny Dawkins	24–12	11–7	4th	NIT Semifinal
2017–18	Johnny Dawkins	19–13	9–9	6th	
2018–19	Johnny Dawkins	24–9	13–5	4th	NCAA Division I second round
2019–20	Johnny Dawkins	16–14	7–11	T–9th	No postseason held
2020–21	Johnny Dawkins	11–12	8–10	6th	
2021–22	Johnny Dawkins	18–12	9–9	6th	
2022–23	Johnny Dawkins	19–15	8–10	7th	NIT second round
Johnny Dawkins (Big 12 Conference) (2023–present)
2023–24	Johnny Dawkins	17–16	7–11	T–11th	NIT first round
2024–25	Johnny Dawkins	20–17	7–13	T–12th	CBC Runner-Up
2025–26	Johnny Dawkins	21–12	9–9	T–7th	NCAA Division I first round
Johnny Dawkins:		189–132	88–94		
Total:		885–722^{[Note A]}			
National champion Postseason invitational champion Conference regular season champion Conference regular season and conference tournament champion Division regular season champion Division regular season and conference tournament champion Conference tournament champion

^A. UCF had its wins from the 2008–09, 2009–10, and 2010–11 seasons vacated.
