= 2008–09 Memphis Tigers men's basketball team =

American college basketball season

2008–09 Memphis Tigers men's basketball

C-USA Regular Season Champions C-USA tournament champions

NCAA tournament, Sweet Sixteen
- Conference: Conference USA

Ranking
- Coaches: No. 9
- AP: No. 3
- Record: 33–4 (16–0 C-USA)
- Head coach: John Calipari (9th year)
- Assistant coaches: John Robic; Orlando Antigua; Josh Pastner
- Home arena: FedExForum

2008–09 Conference USA men's basketball standings
	Conf.				Overall
Team	W		L	PCT	W		L	PCT
No. 3 Memphis †	16	–	0	1.000	33	–	4	.892
Tulsa	12	–	4	.750	25	–	11	.694
UAB	11	–	5	.688	22	–	12	.647
Houston	10	–	6	.625	21	–	12	.636
UTEP	10	–	6	.625	23	–	14	.622
Marshall	7	–	9	.438	15	–	17	.469
Tulane	7	–	9	.438	14	–	17	.452
East Carolina	5	–	11	.313	13	–	17	.433
Southern Miss	4	–	12	.250	15	–	17	.469
Rice	4	–	12	.250	10	–	22	.313
SMU	3	–	13	.188	9	–	21	.300
UCF	0	–	9	.000	0	–	14	.000
† 2009 CUSA Tournament winner As of April 1, 2009; Rankings from AP Poll; *UCF vacated its wins from the 2008–09 season after it was discovered that there was an ineligible player on the team.

The 2008–09 Memphis Tigers men's basketball team represented the University of Memphis in the 2008–09 college basketball season, the 88th season of Tiger basketball. The Tigers were coached by ninth-year head coach John Calipari, and they played their home games at the FedExForum in Memphis, Tennessee.

== Recruiting ==
College recruiting information
Name	Hometown	School	Height	Weight	Commit date
Tyreke Evans; PG	Chester, PA	American Christian	6 ft 6 in (1.98 m)	195 lb (88 kg)	Apr 16, 2008
Tyreke Evans; PG	Recruit ratings: Scout: Rivals: (98)				
Ángel García; PF	Toa Baja, Puerto Rico	East Chicago Central	6 ft 11 in (2.11 m)	200 lb (91 kg)	Sep 2, 2007
Ángel García; PF	Recruit ratings: Scout: Rivals: (93)				
C. J. Henry; SG	Oklahoma City, OK	Putnam City	6 ft 3 in (1.91 m)	195 lb (88 kg)	Aug 26, 2008
C. J. Henry; SG	Recruit ratings: Rivals: (N/A)				
Roburt Sallie; SG	Sacramento, CA	City College of San Francisco	6 ft 5 in (1.96 m)	195 lb (88 kg)	Jun 16, 2008
Roburt Sallie; SG	Recruit ratings: Rivals: (N/A)				
Matt Simpkins; PF	Patterson, NC	The Patterson School	6 ft 9 in (2.06 m)	205 lb (93 kg)	Jan 5, 2008
Matt Simpkins; PF	Recruit ratings: Scout: Rivals: (80)				
Wesley Witherspoon; SF	Atlanta, GA	Berkmar	6 ft 8 in (2.03 m)	185 lb (84 kg)	May 1, 2008
Wesley Witherspoon; SF	Recruit ratings: Scout: Rivals: (96)				
Overall recruit ranking: Scout: 6 Rivals: 4 ESPN: 14
Note: In many cases, Scout, Rivals, 247Sports, On3, and ESPN may conflict in their listings of height and weight.; In these cases, the average was taken. ESPN grades are on a 100-point scale.; Sources: "Memphis Basketball Commitments". Rivals.; "2008 Memphis Basketball Commits". Scout.; "ESPN". ESPN.; "Scout.com Team Recruiting Rankings". Scout.; "2008 Team Ranking". Rivals.

== Roster ==
2008–09 Memphis Tigers men's basketball team
Players
Coaches

Pos.	#	Name	Height	Weight	Year	Hometown
F	0	Shawn Taggart	6 ft 10 in (2.08 m)	230 lb (104 kg)	Jr	Richmond, Virginia
G	1	Willie Kemp	6 ft 2 in (1.88 m)	175 lb (79 kg)	Jr	Bolivar, Tennessee
F	2	Robert Dozier	6 ft 9 in (2.06 m)	215 lb (98 kg)	Sr	Lithonia, Georgia
G	3	Roburt Sallie	6 ft 5 in (1.96 m)	186 lb (84 kg)	So	Sacramento, California
F	4	Pierre Henderson-Niles	6 ft 8 in (2.03 m)	310 lb (141 kg)	Jr	Memphis, Tennessee
G	5	Antonio Anderson	6 ft 6 in (1.98 m)	210 lb (95 kg)	Sr	Lynn, Massachusetts
G	10	Chance McGrady	6 ft 2 in (1.88 m)	180 lb (82 kg)	Sr	Auburndale, Florida
G/F	11	Wesley Witherspoon	6 ft 9 in (2.06 m)	210 lb (95 kg)	Fr	Atlanta, Georgia
G	12	Tyreke Evans	6 ft 6 in (1.98 m)	195 lb (88 kg)	Fr	Chester, Pennsylvania
G	14	C. J. Henry	6 ft 3 in (1.91 m)	195 lb (88 kg)	Fr	Oklahoma City, Oklahoma
F	15	Matt Simpkins	6 ft 9 in (2.06 m)	215 lb (98 kg)	Fr	Sacramento, California
G	20	Doneal Mack	6 ft 5 in (1.96 m)	175 lb (79 kg)	Jr	Charlotte, North Carolina
G	31	Preston Laird	6 ft 2 in (1.88 m)	182 lb (83 kg)	Fr	Memphis, Tennessee
G	32	Jeff Robinson	6 ft 5 in (1.96 m)	210 lb (95 kg)	Fr	Columbus, New Jersey
F	41	Ángel García	6 ft 11 in (2.11 m)	200 lb (91 kg)	Fr	Toa Baja, Puerto Rico

Head coach

- John Calipari (Clarion)

Assistant coach(es)

- John Robic (Denison)
- Orlando Antigua (Pittsburgh)
- Josh Pastner (Arizona)

Legend

- (C) Team captain
- (S) Suspended
- (I) Ineligible
- (W) Walk-on
- Injured
- Current redshirt

Roster
Last update: 2010-06-04

== Schedule ==
Date time, TV	Rank^{#}	Opponent^{#}	Result	Record	Site (attendance) city, state
Regular season
Sat, Nov 15*; 7:00 pm	No. 13	Fairfield	W 90–63	1–0	FedExForum (17,741); Memphis, TN
Mon, Nov 17*; 11:00 pm, ESPN	No. 13	Massachusetts	W 80–58	2–0	FedExForum (18,254); Memphis, TN
Thu, Nov 20*; 3:30 pm	No. 13	vs. Chattanooga; O'Reilly Auto Parts Puerto Rico Tip-Off	W 83–71	3–0	Coliseo de Puerto Rico (3,207); Hato Rey, PR
Fri, Nov 21*; 6:00 pm	No. 13	vs. Seton Hall; O'Reilly Auto Parts Puerto Rico Tip-Off	W 84–70	4–0	Coliseo de Puerto Rico (6,733); Hato Rey, PR
Sun, Nov 23*; 6:30 pm	No. 13	vs. Xavier; O'Reilly Auto Parts Puerto Rico Tip-Off	L 58–63	4–1	Coliseo de Puerto Rico (8,242); Hato Rey, PR
Tue, Dec 2*; 7:00 pm	No. 18	Marist	W 100–61	5–1	FedExForum (17,329); Memphis, TN
Sat, Dec 13*; 1:00 pm, CBS	No. 17	at No. 19 Georgetown	L 70–79 ^{OT}	5–2	Verizon Center (15,238); Washington, D.C.
Wed, Dec 17*; 7:00 pm	No. 23	Arkansas-Little Rock	W 59–51	6–2	FedExForum (17,220); Memphis, TN
Sat, Dec 20*; 5:00 pm, ESPN	No. 23	No. 17 Syracuse	L 65–72	6–3	FedExForum (17,091); Memphis, TN
Mon, Dec 22*; 12:00 pm		Drexel	W 87–49	7–3	FedExForum (16,715); Memphis, TN
Mon, Dec 29*; 8:00 pm, ESPN2		Cincinnati	W 60–45	8–3	FedExForum (18,071); Memphis, TN
Wed, Dec 31*; 1:00 pm		Northeastern	W 80–48	9–3	FedExForum (17,1643); Memphis, TN
Sat, Jan 3*; 7:00 pm		Lamar	W 108–75	10–3	FedExForum (16,386); Memphis, TN
Wed, Jan 7; 8:00 pm		Marshall	W 80–57	11–3 (1–0)	FedExForum (17,606); Memphis, TN
Sat, Jan 10; 4:00 pm		at UCF	W 73–66	12–3 (2–0)	UCF Arena (9,825); Orlando, FL
Tue, Jan 13; 6:30 pm, ESPN2		at Tulsa	W 55–54	13–3 (3–0)	Reynolds Center (5,936); Tulsa, OK
Sat, Jan 17; 7:00 pm		UAB	W 81–68	14–3 (4–0)	FedExForum (18,456); Memphis, TN
Wed, Jan 21; 8:00 pm	No. 22	Rice	W 80–52	15–3 (5–0)	FedExForum (17,589); Memphis, TN
Sat, Jan 24*; 2:30 pm, CBS	No. 22	at Tennessee	W 54–52	16–3 (5–0)	Thompson-Boling Arena (21,905); Knoxville, TN
Wed, Jan 28; 6:00 pm	No. 18	at East Carolina	W 85–64	17–3 (6–0)	Williams Arena at Minges Coliseum (5,705); Greenville, NC
Sat, Jan 31; 12:00 pm	No. 18	Houston	W 83–68	18–3 (7–0)	FedExForum (17,687); Memphis, TN
Wed, Feb 4; 8:00 pm	No. 14	at SMU	W 79–66	19–3 (8–0)	Moody Coliseum (5,056); Dallas, TX
Sat, Feb 7*; 8:00 pm, ESPN	No. 14	at No. 18 Gonzaga; ESPN College GameDay	W 68–50	20–3 (8–0)	Spokane Arena (11,339); Spokane, WA
Wed, Feb 11; 7:00 pm	No. 8	Tulsa	W 63–37	21–3 (9–0)	FedExForum (17,941); Memphis, TN
Sat, Feb 14; 4:00 pm	No. 8	at Southern Miss	W 72–47	22–3 (10–3)	Reed Green Coliseum (5,431); Hattiesburg, MS
Wed, Feb 18; 7:00 pm	No. 5	SMU	W 90–47	23–3 (11–0)	FedExForum (17,497); Memphis, TN
Sat, Feb 21; 3:00 pm, ESPN	No. 5	at UTEP	W 70–63	24–3 (12–0)	Don Haskins Center (11,659); El Paso, TX
Thu, Feb 26; 8:00 pm, ESPN2	No. 5	at UAB	W 71–60	25–3 (13–0)	Bartow Arena (9,153); Birmingham, AL
Sat, Feb 28; 12:00 pm	No. 5	Southern Miss	W 58–42	26–3 (14–0)	FedExForum (18,454); Memphis, TN
Wed, Mar 3; 6:00 pm	No. 5	at Houston	W 69–60	27–3 (15–0)	Hofheinz Pavilion (6,049); Houston, TX
Sat, Mar 7; 12:00 pm	No. 5	Tulane	W 74–47	28–3 (16–0)	FedExForum (18,466); Memphis, TN
Conference USA Tournament
Thu, Mar 12; 6:00 pm	(1) No. 4	vs. (8) Tulane; Quarterfinal	W 51–41	29–3	FedExForum (12,141); Memphis, TN
Fri, Mar 13; 3:00 pm	(1) No. 4	vs. (5) Houston; Semifinal	W 74–49	30–3	FedExForum (11,792); Memphis, TN
Sat, Mar 14; 10:35 am, CBS	(1) No. 4	vs. (8) Tulsa; Championship	W 64–39	31–3	FedExForum (14,058); Memphis, TN
NCAA Tournament
Thu, Mar 19*; 11:25 am, CBS	(2W) No. 3	vs. (15) Cal State Northridge; First Round	W 81–70	32–3	Sprint Center (17,319); Kansas City, MO
Sat, Mar 21*; 2:20 pm, CBS	(2W) No. 3	vs. (10) Maryland; Second round	W 89–70	33–3	Sprint Center (18,247); Kansas City, MO
Thu, Mar 26*; 8:37 pm, CBS	(2W) No. 3	vs. (3) No. 9 Missouri; Sweet Sixteen	L 91–102	33–4	University of Phoenix Stadium (20,101); Glendale, AZ
*Non-conference game. ^{#}Rankings from AP poll. (#) Tournament seedings in parentheses. All times are in Central Time.

== Rankings ==
Poll	Pre	Wk 1	Wk 2	Wk 3	Wk 4	Wk 5	Wk 6	Wk 7	Wk 8	Wk 9	Wk 10	Wk 11	Wk 12	Wk 13	Wk 14	Wk 15	Wk 16	Wk 17	Wk 18	Final
AP	13	13	18	18	17	23					22	18	14	8	5	5	5	4	3	–
Coaches	12	12	17	15	15	21	24				25	19	15	10	6	4	3	3	2	9
