= 2009 Conference USA men's basketball tournament =

- Classification: Division I
- Season: 2008–09
- Teams: 12
- Site: FedExForum; Memphis, Tennessee
- Champions: Memphis (4th title)
- Winning coach: John Calipari (4th title)
- MVP: Tyreke Evans (Memphis)

2008–09 Conference USA men's basketball standings
	Conf.				Overall
Team	W		L	PCT	W		L	PCT
No. 3 Memphis †	16	–	0	1.000	33	–	4	.892
Tulsa	12	–	4	.750	25	–	11	.694
UAB	11	–	5	.688	22	–	12	.647
Houston	10	–	6	.625	21	–	12	.636
UTEP	10	–	6	.625	23	–	14	.622
Marshall	7	–	9	.438	15	–	17	.469
Tulane	7	–	9	.438	14	–	17	.452
East Carolina	5	–	11	.313	13	–	17	.433
Southern Miss	4	–	12	.250	15	–	17	.469
Rice	4	–	12	.250	10	–	22	.313
SMU	3	–	13	.188	9	–	21	.300
UCF	0	–	9	.000	0	–	14	.000
† 2009 CUSA Tournament winner As of April 1, 2009; Rankings from AP Poll; *UCF vacated its wins from the 2008–09 season after it was discovered that there was an ineligible player on the team.

The 2009 Conference USA men's basketball tournament took place March 11–14, 2009, at the FedExForum in Memphis, Tennessee. Memphis beat Tulsa 64-39 in the championship game.

== Bracket ==
First round March 11
8	Tulane	69
9	East Carolina	59
5	Houston	85
12	SMU	76
7	Marshall	59
10	Rice	60
6	UCF	53
11	Southern Miss	77

Second round March 12
8	Tulane	41
1	#4 Memphis	51
5	Houston	89*
4	UTEP	85
10	Rice	51
2	Tulsa	73
11	Southern Miss	73
3	UAB	74*

Semifinals; March 13
1	#4 Memphis	74
5	Houston	49
2	Tulsa	70
3	UAB	67

Championship game March 14
1	#4 Memphis	64
2	Tulsa	39

Asterisk denotes game ended in overtime.
