= 1995–96 UCF Golden Knights men's basketball team =

American college basketball season

1995–96 UCF Golden Knights men's basketball
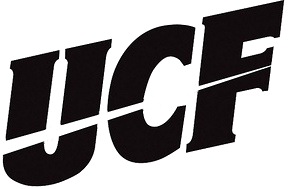

TAAC tournament champions

NCAA tournament, first round
- Conference: Trans American Athletic Conference
- Record: 11–19 (6–10 TAAC)
- Head coach: Kirk Speraw (3rd season)
- Home arena: UCF Arena

1995–96 Trans America Athletic Conference men's basketball standings
	Conf.				Overall
Team	W		L	PCT	W		L	PCT
East
College of Charleston	15	–	1	.938	25	–	4	.862
Campbell	11	–	5	.688	17	–	11	.607
Florida International	6	–	10	.375	13	–	15	.464
Stetson	6	–	10	.375	10	–	17	.370
Central Florida †	6	–	10	.375	11	–	19	.367
Florida Atlantic	5	–	11	.313	9	–	18	.333
West
Samford	11	–	5	.688	16	–	11	.593
Southeastern Louisiana	11	–	5	.688	15	–	12	.556
Centenary	8	–	8	.500	11	–	16	.407
Mercer	7	–	9	.438	15	–	14	.517
Georgia State	6	–	10	.375	10	–	16	.385
Jacksonville State	4	–	12	.250	10	–	17	.370
† 1996 TAAC tournament winner Rankings from AP poll

The 1995–96 UCF Golden Knights men's basketball team represented the University of Central Florida as members of the Trans America Athletic Conference during the 1995–96 NCAA Division I men's basketball season. They played their home games at the UCF Arena in Orlando, Florida, and were led by head coach Kirk Speraw who was in his third season with the team. After finishing tied for third in the TAAC East division regular season standings, the Golden Knights won the TAAC tournament to secure the conference's automatic bid to the NCAA tournament. Playing as the No. 16 seed in the East region, UCF was beaten handily by No. 1 seed and eventual Final Four participant UMass, 92–70.

== Roster ==
1995–96 UCF Knights men's basketball team
Players	Coaches
Pos. / # / Name / Height / Weight / Year / Hometown; G / / Harry Kennedy / 6 ft 5 in (1.96 m) / — / Jr	Head coach: Kirk Speraw (Iowa); Assistant coach(es) Legend: (C) Team captain; (S) Suspended; (I) Ineligible; (W) Walk-on; Injured; Current redshirt

== Schedule and results ==
Date time, TV	Rank^{#}	Opponent^{#}	Result	Record	Site city, state
Regular season
Dec 2, 1995*		Northern Iowa	L 78–95	2–1	UCF Arena; Orlando, Florida
Dec 19, 1995*		at No. 18 Georgia	L 54–103	2–4	Stegeman Coliseum; Athens, Georgia
Dec 21, 1995*		at Northern Iowa	L 71–76	2–5	UNI-Dome; Cedar Falls, Iowa
Dec 28, 1995*		vs. Davidson	L 51–90	2–6	Thomas & Mack Center; Las Vegas, Nevada
Dec 29, 1995*		at UNLV	L 53–74	2–7	Thomas & Mack Center; Las Vegas, Nevada
TAAC tournament
Feb 29, 1996*		vs. Southeastern Louisiana; Quarterfinals	W 83–80	9–18	Edmunds Center; DeLand, Florida
Mar 1, 1996*		vs. Campbell; Semifinals	W 80–71	10–18	Edmunds Center; DeLand, Florida
Mar 2, 1996*		vs. Mercer; Championship game	W 86–77	11–18	Edmunds Center; DeLand, Florida
NCAA tournament
Mar 14, 1996*; CBS	(16 E)	vs. (1 E) No. 1 UMass; First round	L 70–92	11–19	Providence Civic Center (11,931); Providence, Rhode Island
*Non-Conference Game. Rankings from AP poll. All times are in Eastern Time.
