= 2008–09 Houston Cougars men's basketball team =

American college basketball season

2008–09 Houston Cougars men's basketball

CBI, First Round
- Conference: Conference USA
- Record: 21–12 (10–6 C-USA)
- Head coach: Tom Penders (5th season)
- Assistant coaches: Melvin Haralson; Kevin Lewis; Jerry Hobbie
- Home arena: Hofheinz Pavilion

2008–09 Conference USA men's basketball standings
	Conf.				Overall
Team	W		L	PCT	W		L	PCT
No. 3 Memphis †	16	–	0	1.000	33	–	4	.892
Tulsa	12	–	4	.750	25	–	11	.694
UAB	11	–	5	.688	22	–	12	.647
Houston	10	–	6	.625	21	–	12	.636
UTEP	10	–	6	.625	23	–	14	.622
Marshall	7	–	9	.438	15	–	17	.469
Tulane	7	–	9	.438	14	–	17	.452
East Carolina	5	–	11	.313	13	–	17	.433
Southern Miss	4	–	12	.250	15	–	17	.469
Rice	4	–	12	.250	10	–	22	.313
SMU	3	–	13	.188	9	–	21	.300
UCF	0	–	9	.000	0	–	14	.000
† 2009 CUSA Tournament winner As of April 1, 2009; Rankings from AP Poll; *UCF vacated its wins from the 2008–09 season after it was discovered that there was an ineligible player on the team.

The 2008–09 Houston Cougars men's basketball team, also known as the Houston Cougars, Houston, or UH, represented the University of Houston in the college basketball 2008–09 season. It was their 64th year of season play. The head coach for the Cougars was Tom Penders, who was serving in his 5th year in that position. The team played its home games at Hofheinz Pavilion on-campus in Houston, Texas.

The Cougars played in the first game of the NCAA Division I season in the 2K Sports College Classic.

== Pre-season ==
The 2007–08 Cougars finished with a 24–10 record, and were invited to compete in the inaugural College Basketball Invitational (CBI). Houston defeated Nevada and Valparaiso, but was defeated in the semifinals by Conference USA rival Tulsa.

== Schedule ==
Date time, TV	Rank^{#}	Opponent^{#}	Result	Record	Site city, state
Regular season
2008/11/10*; 3:00PM		vs. Georgia Southern; 2K Sports College Classic	L 61–63	0–1	Cameron Indoor Stadium (9,314); Durham, North Carolina
2008/11/11*; 5:00PM		vs. Presbyterian; 2K Sports College Classic	W 76–57	1–1	Cameron Indoor Stadium (9,314); Durham, North Carolina
2008/11/15*; 3:00PM		Western Kentucky	W 73–64	2–1	Hofheinz Pavilion (3,217); Houston, Texas
2008/11/18*; 7:00PM		Alcorn State	W 110–57	3–1	Hofheinz Pavilion (3,154); Houston, Texas
2008/11/29*; 7:00PM		North Texas	W 84–51	4–1	Hofheinz Pavilion (3,025); Houston, Texas
2008/12/02*; 7:00PM		at Middle Tennessee	W 70–67	5–1	Murphy Center (4,122); Murfreesboro, Tennessee
2008/12/13*; 7:00PM		Mississippi Valley State	W 92–58	6–1	Hofheinz Pavilion (2,836); Houston, Texas
2008/12/20*; 6:00PM		at Toledo	W 71–63	7–1	Savage Hall (4,927); Toledo, Ohio
2008/12/28*; 5:00PM		Iowa State	L 67–71	7–2	Hofheinz Pavilion (3,362); Houston, Texas
2008/12/30*; 1:00PM		Massachusetts	W 80–54	8–2	Hofheinz Pavilion (3,623); Houston, Texas
2009/01/03*; 3:00PM, CBS CS		at Mississippi State	L 65–82	8–3	Humphrey Coliseum (8,253); Starkville, Mississippi
2009/01/06*; 7:00PM		Texas A&M–Corpus Christi	W 85–65	9–3	Hofheinz Pavilion (3,034); Houston, Texas
2009/01/10; 7:00PM		UAB	W 75–56	10–3 (1–0)	Hofheinz Pavilion (3,472); Houston, Texas
2009/01/14; 8:05PM		at UTEP	W 94–86	11–3 (2–0)	Don Haskins Center (9,167); El Paso, Texas
2009/01/17; 4:00PM		at Southern Miss	L 76–83	11–4 (2–1)	Reed Green Coliseum (4,195); Hattiesburg, Mississippi
2009/01/21; 7:00PM		East Carolina	W 85–67	12–4 (3–1)	Hofheinz Pavilion (3,520); Houston, Texas
2009/01/24*; 5:00PM, FSN		at Arizona	L 90–96 ^{OT}	12–5	McKale Center (13,802); Tucson, Arizona
2009/01/28; 7:00PM		UTEP	L 55–62	12–6 (3–2)	Hofheinz Pavilion (3,917); Houston, Texas
2009/01/31; 12:00PM, CBS CS		at No. 18 Memphis	L 68–83	12–7 (3–3)	FedExForum (17,687); Memphis, Tennessee
2009/02/04; 6:00PM, CBS CS		at UCF	W 97–69	13–7 (4–3)	UCF Arena (5,868); Orlando, Florida
2009/02/07; 8:00PM		Rice; Bayou Cup	W 72–65	14–7 (5–3)	Hofheinz Pavilion (5,533); Houston, Texas
2009/02/11; 7:00PM		at SMU	W 69–56	15–7 (6–3)	Moody Coliseum (2,702); Dallas, Texas
2009/02/14; 7:00PM		Tulane	W 83–64	16–7 (7–3)	Hofheinz Pavilion (3,243); Houston, Texas
2009/02/18; 6:00PM		at Marshall	L 83–88	16–8 (7–4)	Cam Henderson Center (3,813); Huntington, West Virginia
2009/02/21; 7:00PM		UCF	W 77–72	17–8 (8–4)	Hofheinz Pavilion (3,816); Houston, Texas
2009/02/25; 7:05PM		at Tulsa	L 68–77	17–9 (8–5)	Reynolds Center (6,097); Tulsa, Oklahoma
2009/02/28; 3:00PM		at Rice; Bayou Cup	W 56–51	18–9 (9–5)	Tudor Fieldhouse (2,737); Houston, Texas
2009/03/04; 7:00PM, CBS CS		No. 5 Memphis	L 60–69	18–10 (9–6)	Hofheinz Pavilion (6,049); Houston, Texas
2009/03/07; 7:00PM		SMU	W 89–77	19–10 (10–6)	Hofheinz Pavilion (5,408); Houston, Texas
Conference USA men's basketball tournament
2009/03/11; 8:30PM	(5)	vs. (12) SMU; First round	W 85–76	20–10	FedEx Forum (9,840); Memphis, Tennessee
2009/03/12; 8:30PM, CSS	(5)	vs. (4) UTEP; Quarterfinals	W 89–85 ^{OT}	21–10	FedEx Forum (12,141); Memphis, Tennessee
2009/03/13; 3:00PM, CBS CS	(5)	at (1) No. 4 Memphis; Semifinals	L 49–74	21–11	FedEx Forum (11,792); Memphis, Tennessee
College Basketball Invitational
2009/03/18*; 9:00PM, HDNet		at Oregon State; First round	L 45–49	21–12	Gill Coliseum (3,511); Corvallis, Oregon
*Non-conference game. ^{#}Rankings from AP Poll. (#) Tournament seedings in parentheses. All times are in Central Standard Time.

== Roster ==
Name	#	Position	Height	Weight	Year	Home Town
Qa'rraan Calhoun	41	Forward	6'8"	215	Junior	Hazlet, New Jersey
Aubrey Coleman	12	Guard	6'4"	200	Junior	Houston, Texas
Sean Coleman	1	Forward	6'8"	190	Senior	Houston, Texas
Marcus Cousin	50	Center	6'11"	250	Junior	Baltimore, Maryland
Jason Hurns	35	Forward	6'4"	200	Junior	Los Angeles, California
Kelvin Lewis	0	Guard	6'4"	190	Junior	Fort Worth, Texas
Horace McGloster	21	Guard	6'7"	205	Sophomore	Newark, New Jersey
Nick Mosley	4	Center	6'9"	220	Junior	Beeville, Texas
Yan Moukoury	15	Forward	6'7"	213	Sophomore	Baton Rouge, Louisiana
Zamal Nixon	2	Guard	6'1"	170	Sophomore	Brooklyn, New York
Brockeith Pane	23	Guard	6'2"	195	Sophomore	Dallas, Texas
Desmond Wade	3	Guard	5'9"	155	Freshman	Linden, New Jersey
DaShaun Williams	11	Guard	6'3"	200	Senior	Chicago, Illinois
Jamon Wilson	20	Guard	6'0"	190	Junior	Houston, Texas
