= 2003–04 UCF Golden Knights men's basketball team =

American college basketball season

2003–04 UCF Golden Knights men's basketball
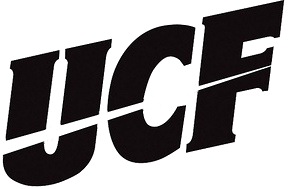

ASUN tournament champions

NCAA tournament, first round
- Conference: Atlantic Sun Conference
- Record: 25–6 (17–3 ASUN)
- Head coach: Kirk Speraw (11th season)
- Assistant coaches: Tom Schuberth; Craig Brown; Dwight Evans
- Home arena: UCF Arena

2003–04 Atlantic Sun men's basketball standings
	Conf.				Overall
Team	W		L	PCT	W		L	PCT
Troy State	18	–	2	.900	24	–	7	.774
UCF †	17	–	3	.850	25	–	6	.806
Belmont	15	–	5	.750	21	–	9	.700
Georgia State	14	–	6	.700	20	–	9	.690
Stetson	10	–	10	.500	12	–	15	.444
Mercer	9	–	11	.450	12	–	18	.400
Jacksonville	8	–	12	.400	13	–	15	.464
Florida Atlantic	6	–	14	.300	9	–	19	.321
Gardner–Webb	6	–	14	.300	9	–	20	.310
Lipscomb	4	–	16	.200	7	–	21	.250
Campbell	3	–	17	.150	3	–	24	.111
† 2004 Atlantic Sun Tournament winner As of March 2, 2004; Rankings from AP Poll

The 2003–04 UCF Golden Knights men's basketball team represented the University of Central Florida as members of the Atlantic Sun Conference during the 2003–04 NCAA Division I men's basketball season. They played their home games at the UCF Arena in Orlando, Florida, and were led by head coach Kirk Speraw, who was in his 11th season with the team. In the previous year, the Golden Knights finished the season 25–9, 17–3 in A-Sun play.

== Roster ==
2003–04 UCF Knights men's basketball team
Players
Coaches

Pos.	#	Name	Height	Weight	Year	Hometown
F	1	Marcus Avant	6 ft 7 in (2.01 m)	200 lb (91 kg)	Jr	Valdosta, GA
F	2	Doug Meeker	6 ft 7 in (2.01 m)	230 lb (104 kg)	Sr	Key West, FL
F	2	Lavell Payne	6 ft 8 in (2.03 m)	210 lb (95 kg)	Fr	Fort Lauderdale, FL
F	4	Dexter Lyons	6 ft 6 in (1.98 m)	200 lb (91 kg)	Sr	College Park, GA
G	5	Mike Battle	6 ft 4 in (1.93 m)	205 lb (93 kg)	Fr	Waldorf, MD
G	5	Gary Johnson	6 ft 2 in (1.88 m)	180 lb (82 kg)	Jr	Wayne, MI
G	10	Kingsley Edwards	6 ft 0 in (1.83 m)	185 lb (84 kg)	Jr	Bronx, NY
G	12	Adam Picow	5 ft 10 in (1.78 m)	170 lb (77 kg)	Fr	Boca Raton, FL
C	13	Roberto Morentin	6 ft 9 in (2.06 m)	240 lb (109 kg)	Sr	Madrid, Spain
G	20	Troy Lindbeck	6 ft 3 in (1.91 m)	185 lb (84 kg)	So	Collinsville, IL
G	21	Justin Rose	6 ft 3 in (1.91 m)	195 lb (88 kg)	So	Junction City, KS
F	22	Marcus Johnson	6 ft 7 in (2.01 m)	235 lb (107 kg)	So	Wayne, MI
F	22	Robert Ross	6 ft 7 in (2.01 m)	195 lb (88 kg)	Sr	Brooklyn, NY
F	30	Josh Peppers	6 ft 6 in (1.98 m)	200 lb (91 kg)	Fr	Memphis, TN
C	32	Ben Stout	7 ft 1 in (2.16 m)	180 lb (82 kg)	So	Orlando, FL
C	33	Josh Bodden	6 ft 9 in (2.06 m)	235 lb (107 kg)	Sr	Dunedin, FL
F	34	Jacob Loucks (redshirt)	6 ft 7 in (2.01 m)	210 lb (95 kg)	Fr	Clearwater, FL
C	35	Will Bakanowsky	6 ft 9 in (2.06 m)	240 lb (109 kg)	So	Gibbsboro, NJ
F		Marcus McGee	6 ft 4 in (1.93 m)	195 lb (88 kg)	So	Fort Lauderdale, FL

Head coach

- Kirk Speraw (Iowa)

Assistant coach(es)

- Tom Schuberth (Mississippi State)
- Craig Brown (Florida)
- Dwight Evans (Birmingham–Southern)

Legend

- (C) Team captain
- (S) Suspended
- (I) Ineligible
- (W) Walk-on
- Injured
- Current redshirt

Roster

== Schedule and results ==
Date time, TV	Rank^{#}	Opponent^{#}	Result	Record	Site city, state
Regular season (non-conference play)
Dec 4, 2003*		vs. No. 2 Florida	L 39–59	2–2	Jacksonville Veteran's Memorial Arena; Jacksonville, Florida
Regular season (ASUN conference play)
Feb 28, 2004		Campbell	W 106–56	22–5 (17–3)	UCF Arena; Orlando, Florida
ASUN tournament
Mar 4, 2004*		vs. Jacksonville; Quarterfinals	W 71–63	23–5	Curb Event Center; Nashville, Tennessee
Mar 5, 2004*		at Belmont; Semifinals	W 64–62	24–5	Curb Event Center; Nashville, Tennessee
Mar 6, 2004*		vs. Troy; Championship game	W 60–55	25–5	Curb Event Center; Nashville, Tennessee
NCAA tournament
Mar 19, 2004*	(14 E)	vs. (3 E) No. 9 Pittsburgh; First round	L 44–53	25–6	Bradley Center; Milwaukee, Wisconsin
*Non-conference game. Rankings from AP poll. All times are in Eastern Time.
