= Isaiah Sykes =

American professional basketball player (born 1991)

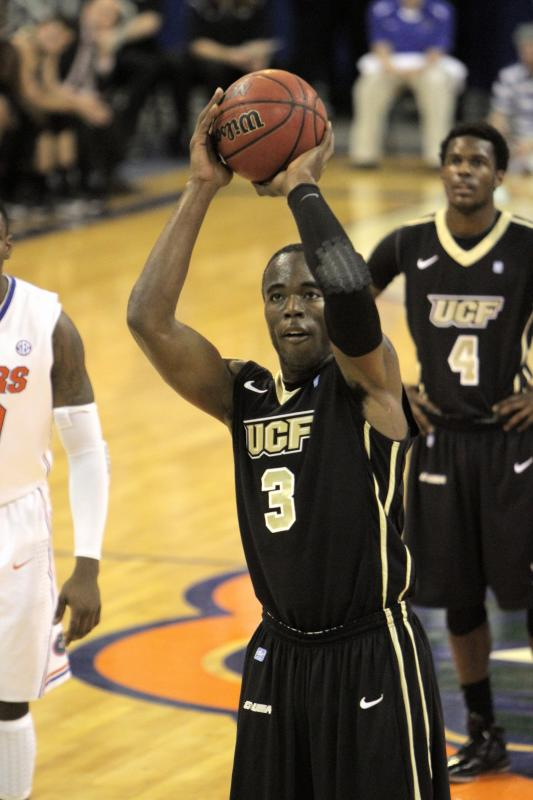

Free agent
- Position: Shooting guard / small forward

Personal information
- Born: December 2, 1991 (age 34) Detroit, Michigan, U.S.
- Listed height: 6 ft 6 in (1.98 m)
- Listed weight: 220 lb (100 kg)

Career information
- High school: Denby (Detroit, Michigan)
- College: UCF (2010–2014)
- NBA draft: 2014: undrafted
- Playing career: 2014–present

Career history
- 2014–2015: Basket Recanati
- 2017: White Wings Hanau
- 2019: Al Mouttahed Tripoli

Career highlights
- Second-team All-AAC (2014); First-team All-C-USA (2013); C-USA All-Defensive Team (2013)

Isaiah Sykes (born December 2, 1991) is an American former basketball player. He played college basketball for the UCF Knights men's basketball team where he was named to the 2013 Conference USA First Team. He scored a career-high 36 points in a double overtime victory over Temple in the opening round of the 2014 AAC tournament.

== High school career ==
Sykes played high school basketball representing Edwin C. Denby High School (Detroit, Michigan). Playing for head coach Chuck Albright, Sykes averaged 19.7 points, 5.9 rebounds and 4.3 assists throughout his senior year. After leading the school to the Michigan Class A state semi-finals, he was selected to play in the Michigan High School All-Star Game in which he scored 17 points. Soon after he graduated from Denby, Sykes played for the Amateur Athletic Union (AAU) team known as the Michigan Hurricanes, under coach Will Smith. He then went on to participate in the 2009 Reebok All-American Camp, earning all-star honors.

== College career ==
Sykes chose to attend the University of Central Florida after also considering the schools: Arkansas, Memphis, Michigan, and Tennessee. In his freshman year, he seemed to have little effect on the success of the program, led by Marcus Jordan and Keith Clanton. By the end of his first season, Sykes averaged 4.0 points and 3.3 rebounds per game. He logged a season-high 12 points against Furman on December 29, 2010.

College recruiting
Name	Hometown	School	Height	Weight	Commit date
Isaiah Sykes; SF	Detroit	Denby high School	6 ft 6 in (1.98 m)	220 lb (100 kg)	May 13, 2010
Isaiah Sykes; SF	Recruit ratings: Scout: Rivals: (89)				

By the end of Sykes's sophomore year, he had made 32 of 33 possible starts in the Knights' regular season schedule. He scored at least 20 points in six of these games and also emerged as a huge rebounder, recording six double-doubles. He was also named the 2012 UCF Holiday Classic MVP.

After averaging 16 points and 7.5 rebounds per game in his junior year in college basketball, Isaiah Sykes was named to the American Athletic Conference All-League Preseason Second Team. During his senior season he averaged 17.2 points per game and scored a career-high 36 points in a victory over the Temple Owls on March 12, 2014. The record initiated a win in the opening round of the 2014 American Athletic Conference men's basketball tournament.

=== College statistics ===
Year	Team	GP	GS	MPG	FG%	3P%	FT%	RPG	APG	SPG	BPG	PPG
2010–11	UCF	32	1	16.4	.563	.000	.475	3.2	.8	.8	.0	4.0
2011–12	UCF	33	32	30.7	.545	.286	.546	6.4	2.0	1.1	.4	12.3
2012–13	UCF	31	31	34.8	.457	.320	.617	7.5	4.5	2.3	.5	16.0
2013–14	UCF	30	30	31.9	.475	.375	.540	7.2	3.5	1.7	.2	17.2

== Professional career ==
After going undrafted in the 2014 NBA draft, Sykes joined the Philadelphia 76ers for the 2014 NBA Summer League. On August 11, 2014, he signed with Basket Recanati of the Serie A2 Gold Basket.
