= 2004 Atlantic Sun men's basketball tournament =

- Classification: Division I
- Season: 2003–04
- Teams: 8
- Site: Curb Event Center; Nashville, TN
- Champions: UCF (3rd title)
- Winning coach: Kirk Speraw (3rd title)
- MVP: Dexter Lyons (UCF)

2003–04 Atlantic Sun men's basketball standings
	Conf.				Overall
Team	W		L	PCT	W		L	PCT
Troy State	18	–	2	.900	24	–	7	.774
UCF †	17	–	3	.850	25	–	6	.806
Belmont	15	–	5	.750	21	–	9	.700
Georgia State	14	–	6	.700	20	–	9	.690
Stetson	10	–	10	.500	12	–	15	.444
Mercer	9	–	11	.450	12	–	18	.400
Jacksonville	8	–	12	.400	13	–	15	.464
Florida Atlantic	6	–	14	.300	9	–	19	.321
Gardner–Webb	6	–	14	.300	9	–	20	.310
Lipscomb	4	–	16	.200	7	–	21	.250
Campbell	3	–	17	.150	3	–	24	.111
† 2004 Atlantic Sun Tournament winner As of March 2, 2004; Rankings from AP Poll

The 2004 Atlantic Sun men's basketball tournament was held March 4–6 at the Curb Event Center at Belmont University in Nashville, Tennessee.

UCF defeated top-seeded, reigning champions Troy State in the championship game, 60–55, to win their third Atlantic Sun/TAAC men's basketball tournament.

The Golden Knights, therefore, received the Atlantic Sun's automatic bid to the 2004 NCAA tournament.

== Format ==
Even though the Atlantic Sun's membership decreased from twelve to eleven (Jacksonville State departed for the Ohio Valley) no changes to the format were made. As such, only the top eight teams from the conference tournament were eligible for the tournament. These eight teams were seeded based on regular season conference records and were all entered into the quarterfinal round.

== Bracket ==
Quarterfinals; Thursday, March 4
1	Troy State	85
8	Florida Atlantic	82
5	Stetson	47
4	Georgia State	55
3	Belmont	71
6	Mercer	63
7	Jacksonville	63
2	UCF	71

Semifinals; Friday, March 5
1	Troy State	63
4	Georgia State	62
3	Belmont	62
2	UCF	64

Championship; Saturday, March 6
1	Troy State	55
2	UCF	60
