= 2004–05 UCF Golden Knights men's basketball team =

American college basketball season

2004–05 UCF Golden Knights men's basketball
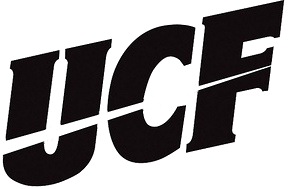

ASUN Regular season co-champions ASUN tournament champions

NCAA tournament, first round
- Conference: Atlantic Sun Conference
- Record: 24–9 (13–7 ASUN)
- Head coach: Kirk Speraw (12th season)
- Assistant coaches: Tom Schuberth; Craig Brown; Dwight Evans
- Home arena: UCF Arena

2004–05 Atlantic Sun men's basketball standings
	Conf.				Overall
Team	W		L	PCT	W		L	PCT
UCF †	13	–	7	.650	24	–	9	.727
Gardner-Webb	13	–	7	.650	18	–	12	.600
Belmont	12	–	8	.600	14	–	16	.467
Lipscomb	11	–	9	.550	16	–	12	.571
Mercer	11	–	9	.550	16	–	12	.571
Jacksonville	11	–	9	.550	16	–	13	.552
Georgia State	11	–	9	.550	14	–	15	.483
Troy State	10	–	10	.500	12	–	18	.400
Florida Atlantic	10	–	10	.500	10	–	17	.370
Stetson	8	–	12	.400	10	–	17	.370
Campbell	0	–	20	.000	2	–	25	.074
† 2005 Atlantic Sun Tournament winner As of March 1, 2005; Rankings from AP Poll

The 2004–05 UCF Golden Knights men's basketball team represented the University of Central Florida as members of the Atlantic Sun Conference during the . They played their home games at the UCF Arena in Orlando, Florida, and were led by head coach Kirk Speraw, who was in his 13th season with the team. In the previous year, the Golden Knights finished the season 24–9, 13–7 in A-Sun play.

== Roster ==
2004–05 UCF Knights men's basketball team
Players
Coaches

Pos.	#	Name	Height	Weight	Year	Hometown
F	1	Marcus Avant	6 ft 7 in (2.01 m)	200 lb (91 kg)	Sr	Valdosta, GA
F	2	Lavell Payne	6 ft 8 in (2.03 m)	210 lb (95 kg)	So	Fort Lauderdale, FL
G	3	Dave Noel	6 ft 3 in (1.91 m)	205 lb (93 kg)	Fr	Boynton Beach, FL
G	4	Mike O'Donnell	6 ft 0 in (1.83 m)	185 lb (84 kg)	Fr	Largo, FL
G	5	Mike Battle	6 ft 4 in (1.93 m)	205 lb (93 kg)	So	Waldorf, MD
G	5	Gary Johnson	6 ft 2 in (1.88 m)	180 lb (82 kg)	Sr	Wayne, MI
G	10	Kingsley Edwards	6 ft 0 in (1.83 m)	185 lb (84 kg)	Sr	Bronx, NY
G	12	Adam Picow	5 ft 10 in (1.78 m)	170 lb (77 kg)	So	Boca Raton, FL
G	20	Troy Lindbeck	6 ft 3 in (1.91 m)	185 lb (84 kg)	Jr	Collinsville, IL
G	21	Justin Rose	6 ft 3 in (1.91 m)	195 lb (88 kg)	Jr	Junction City, KS
F	22	Marcus Johnson	6 ft 7 in (2.01 m)	235 lb (107 kg)	Jr	Wayne, MI
C	25	Adam Gill	6 ft 9 in (2.06 m)	225 lb (102 kg)	Fr	Springboro, OH
F	30	Josh Peppers	6 ft 6 in (1.98 m)	200 lb (91 kg)	So	Memphis, TN
F	32	Albert Smidebush	6 ft 5 in (1.96 m)	195 lb (88 kg)	Fr	Vero Beach, FL
F	33	Anthony Williams	6 ft 8 in (2.03 m)	220 lb (100 kg)	Jr	Omaha, NE
F	34	Jacob Loucks (redshirt)	6 ft 7 in (2.01 m)	210 lb (95 kg)	So	Clearwater, FL
C	35	Will Bakanowsky	6 ft 9 in (2.06 m)	240 lb (109 kg)	Jr	Gibbsboro, NJ

Head coach

- Kirk Speraw (Iowa)

Assistant coach(es)

- Tom Schuberth (Mississippi State)
- Craig Brown (Florida)
- Dwight Evans (Birmingham–Southern)

Legend

- (C) Team captain
- (S) Suspended
- (I) Ineligible
- (W) Walk-on
- Injured
- Current redshirt

Roster

== Schedule and results ==
Date time, TV	Rank^{#}	Opponent^{#}	Result	Record	Site city, state
Exhibition
Nov 11, 2004*		Saint Leo	W 73–66		UCF Arena; Orlando, Florida
Regular season (non-conference play)
Nov 18, 2004*		at Alaska-Fairbanks	W 74–63	1–0	Carlson Center (3,509); Fairbanks, Alaska
Nov 20, 2004*		vs. Utah State	W 55–52	2–0	Carlson Center (3,562); Fairbanks, Alaska
Nov 21, 2004*		vs. New Mexico State	W 62–58	3–0	Carlson Center (2,281); Fairbanks, Alaska
Nov 24, 2004*		Puerto Rico–Mayagüez	W 97–52	4–0	UCF Arena (776); Orlando, Florida
Dec 2, 2004		Gardner-Webb	L 55–67	4–1 (0–1)	UCF Arena (1,356); Orlando, Florida
Dec 4, 2004*		UMKC	W 62–56	5–1	UCF Arena (1,275); Orlando, Florida
Dec 16, 2004		Campbell	W 90–73	6–1 (1–1)	UCF Arena (822); Orlando, Florida
Dec 18, 2004*		UMKC	W 57–56	7–1	Municipal Auditorium (2,669); Kansas City, Missouri
Dec 28, 2004*		Brown	L 82–83 ^{OT}	7–2	UCF Arena (1,036); Orlando, Florida
Dec 29, 2004*		Fordham	W 65–61	8–2	UCF Arena (641); Orlando, Florida
Regular season (ASUN conference play)
Jan 3, 2005		at Georgia State	L 63–76	8–3 (1–2)	GSU Sports Arena (320); Atlanta, Georgia
Jan 5, 2005		at Mercer	L 71–80	8–4 (1–3)	Hawkins Arena (1,225); Macon, Georgia
Jan 9, 2005		Jacksonville	W 75–57	9–4 (2–3)	UCF Arena (1,062); Orlando, Florida
Jan 11, 2005		Stetson	W 70–66	10–4 (3–3)	UCF Arena (2,159); Orlando, Florida
Jan 13, 2005		at Florida Atlantic	W 73–70	11–4 (4–3)	FAU Arena (1,044); Boca Raton, Florida
Jan 16, 2005		Troy	W 87–70	12–4 (5–3)	UCF Arena (1,278); Orlando, Florida
Jan 20, 2005		Florida Atlantic	L 61–73	12–5 (5–4)	UCF Arena (1,738); Orlando, Florida
Jan 23, 2005		at Belmont	L 52–67	12–6 (5–5)	Curb Event Center (819); Nashville, Tennessee
Jan 25, 2005		at Lipscomb	L 63–64	12–7 (5–6)	Allen Arena (1,090); Nashville, Tennessee
Jan 29, 2005		Belmont	W 60–57	13–7 (6–6)	UCF Arena (1,676); Orlando, Florida
Jan 31, 2005		Lipscomb	W 67–58	14–7 (7–6)	UCF Arena (1,139); Orlando, Florida
Feb 4, 2005		at Troy	W 77–73	15–7 (8–6)	Sartain Hall (2,963); Troy, Alabama
Feb 10, 2005		at Stetson	W 71–62	16–7 (9–6)	Edmunds Center (4,228); DeLand, Florida
Feb 12, 2005		at Jacksonville	L 82–83 ^{OT}	16–8 (9–7)	Jacksonville Veterans Memorial Arena (1,308); Jacksonville, Florida
Feb 17, 2005		Mercer	W 79–65	17–8 (10–7)	UCF Arena (1,142); Orlando, Florida
Feb 19, 2005		Georgia State	W 70–65	18–8 (11–7)	UCF Arena (1,824); Orlando, Florida
Feb 21, 2005*		South Dakota State; ESPN BracketBusters	W 82–72	19–8	UCF Arena (1,322); Orlando, Florida
Feb 24, 2005		at Gardner-Webb	W 58–55	20–8 (12–7)	Paul Porter Arena (3,281); Boiling Springs, North Carolina
Feb 26, 2005		at Campbell	W 63–52	21–8 (13–7)	Carter Gymnasium (806); Buies Creek, North Carolina
ASUN tournament
Mar 3, 2005*	(2)	vs. (7) Mercer; Quarterfinals	W 81–68	22–8	Curb Event Center (785); Nashville, Tennessee
Mar 4, 2005*	(2)	at (3) Belmont; Semifinals	W 66–61	23–8	Curb Event Center (3,482); Nashville, Tennessee
Mar 5, 2005*	(2)	vs. (1) Gardner-Webb; Championship game	W 63–54	24–8	Curb Event Center (2,133); Nashville, Tennessee
NCAA tournament
Mar 18, 2005*; 2:35 p.m., CBS	(15 E)	vs. (2 E) No. 13 Connecticut; First round	L 71–77	24–9	DCU Center (13,009); Worcester, Massachusetts
*Non-conference game. Rankings from AP poll. All times are in Eastern Time.
