= 2005 Atlantic Sun men's basketball tournament =

- Classification: Division I
- Season: 2004–05
- Teams: 8
- Site: Curb Event Center; Nashville, TN
- Champions: UCF (4th title)
- Winning coach: Kirk Speraw (4th title)
- MVP: Gary Johnson (UCF)

2004–05 Atlantic Sun men's basketball standings
	Conf.				Overall
Team	W		L	PCT	W		L	PCT
UCF †	13	–	7	.650	24	–	9	.727
Gardner-Webb	13	–	7	.650	18	–	12	.600
Belmont	12	–	8	.600	14	–	16	.467
Lipscomb	11	–	9	.550	16	–	12	.571
Mercer	11	–	9	.550	16	–	12	.571
Jacksonville	11	–	9	.550	16	–	13	.552
Georgia State	11	–	9	.550	14	–	15	.483
Troy State	10	–	10	.500	12	–	18	.400
Florida Atlantic	10	–	10	.500	10	–	17	.370
Stetson	8	–	12	.400	10	–	17	.370
Campbell	0	–	20	.000	2	–	25	.074
† 2005 Atlantic Sun Tournament winner As of March 1, 2005; Rankings from AP Poll

The 2005 Atlantic Sun men's basketball tournament was held March 3–5 at the Curb Event Center at Belmont University in Nashville, Tennessee.

UCF defeated top-seeded Gardner–Webb in the championship game, 63–54, to win their fourth (and second consecutive) Atlantic Sun/TAAC men's basketball tournament.

The Golden Knights, therefore, received the Atlantic Sun's automatic bid to the 2005 NCAA tournament.

== Format ==
With the Atlantic Sun's membership remaining stable at eleven teams, no changes were made to the tournament format. As such, only the top eight teams from the conference tournament were eligible for the tournament. These eight teams were seeded based on regular season conference records and were all entered into the quarterfinal round.

== Bracket ==
Quarterfinals; Thursday, March 3
1	Gardner–Webb	64
8	Troy State	62
5	Lipscomb	64
4	Jacksonville	68
3	Belmont	67
6	Georgia State	61
7	Mercer	68
2	UCF	81

Semifinals; Friday, March 4
1	Gardner–Webb	77
4	Jacksonville	76
3	Belmont	61
2	UCF	66

Championship; Saturday, March 5
1	Gardner–Webb	54
2	UCF	63
