= Kirk Speraw =

American college basketball coach

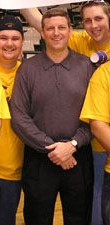
- Kirk Speraw and "Kirk's Jerks" on the UCF campus.

Biographical details
- Born: August 21, 1956 (age 70); Sioux City, Iowa, U.S.

Playing career
- 1977–1979: Iowa
- Position: Guard

Coaching career (HC unless noted)
- 1979–1980: Iowa (asst.)
- 1980–1982: Denver (asst.)
- 1982–1987: Florida Southern (asst.)
- 1987–1990: Pensacola JC
- 1990–1993: Florida (asst.)
- 1993–2010: UCF
- 2010–2022: Iowa (asst.)

Head coaching record
- Overall: 279–233 (.545) (college)
- Tournaments: 0–4 (NCAA Division I)

Accomplishments and honors

Championships
- 4 ASUN tournament (1994, 1996, 2004, 2005); ASUN regular season (2005)

Awards
- C-USA Coach of the Year (2007)

Kirk Crittendon Speraw (born August 21, 1956) is an American former basketball coach who was most recently an assistant basketball coach at the University of Iowa. Speraw previously served as the head coach for the men's basketball team at University of Central Florida (UCF) from 1993 to 2010, during which UCF made four appearances in the NCAA tournament.

== Early life and education ==
Kirk Crittendon Speraw was born and raised in Sioux City, Iowa. Before Kirk went to high school, his father Eugene "Bud" Speraw was an assistant basketball coach at Sioux City Central High School. Kirk followed his father to Sioux City Central games and helped keep statistics. Kirk later attended Sioux City North High School and lettered in basketball and four other sports, playing at guard on the basketball team.

Graduating in 1975, Speraw turned down scholarships from smaller schools to walk on at the University of Iowa. Playing under head coach Lute Olson, Speraw lettered in the 1977–78 and 1978–79 seasons, during the latter of which Iowa won the Big Ten Conference regular season title and made the NCAA tournament.

== Coaching career ==
After graduating from Iowa in 1979, Speraw joined Olson's staff at Iowa as a graduate assistant. In the 1979–80 season, Iowa made the Final Four.

From 1980 to 1982, Speraw was assistant coach and recruiting coordinator at the University of Denver, then a Division II school, under Floyd Theard. Speraw again coached at the Division II level as an assistant at Florida Southern from 1982 to 1987, including for Florida Southern's third-place finish in the 1986 NCAA tournament.

Speraw got his first head coaching job in 1987 at Pensacola Junior College. In three seasons, Speraw led Pensacola to an 82–21 record and three straight Panhandle Conference titles. In 1990, Speraw was named NABC/Kodak National Junior College Coach of the Year and Florida Junior College Coach of the Year, after Pensacola went 31–7 and finished fifth nationally.

After three seasons at Pensacola, Speraw returned to the Division I level for the first time in a near-decade as an assistant coach at the University of Florida under Lon Kruger and served in that position from 1990 to 1993. Florida made the National Invitation Tournament in 1992 and 1993 and advanced to the 1992 NIT semifinals. Among players Speraw coached at Florida were Andrew DeClercq, who would later play in the NBA.

=== UCF (1993–2010) ===
On July 28, 1993, the University of Central Florida (UCF) hired Speraw as its men's basketball head coach. Inheriting a team that finished 10–17 in the previous season, Speraw led UCF to a 21–9 finish, Atlantic Sun tournament title, and the program's debut NCAA Tournament appearance in his first season.

Speraw's most successful season at UCF was 2003–04, when the Knights finished 25–6, received votes for the top 25, won the Atlantic Sun championship, and reached the NCAA tournament.

Conference USA named Speraw the men's basketball Coach of the Year for the 2006–07 season.

On March 15, 2010, UCF fired Kirk Speraw as head basketball coach.

On February 20, 2012, UCF announced that it was vacating its wins from the 2008–2009 and 2009–2010 seasons after it was discovered that there was an ineligible player on the team.

=== Iowa assistant (2010–2022) ===
On April 23, 2010, Speraw joined Fran McCaffery's staff at Iowa, Speraw's alma mater. Following the 2021-2022 season, Speraw announced his retirement from coaching.

=== Head coaching record ===
Record table
Season	Team	Overall	Conference	Standing	Postseason
UCF Knights (Atlantic Sun Conference) (1993–2005)
1993–94	UCF	21–9	11–5	2nd	NCAA Division I First Round
1994–95	UCF	11–16	7–9	T–5th	
1995–96	UCF	11–19	6–10	T–3rd (East)	NCAA Division I First Round
1996–97	UCF	7–19	4–12	6th (East)	
1997–98	UCF	17–11	11–5	3rd (East)	
1998–99	UCF	19–10	13–3	2nd	
1999–2000	UCF	14–18	10–8	T–5th	
2000–01	UCF	8–23	3–15	10th	
2001–02	UCF	17–12	12–8	T–4th	
2002–03	UCF	21–11	11–5	3rd (South)	
2003–04	UCF	25–6	17–3	2nd	NCAA Division I First Round
2004–05	UCF	24–9	13–7	T–1st	NCAA Division I First Round
UCF Knights (Conference USA) (2005–2010)
2005–06	UCF	14–15	7–7	5th	
2006–07	UCF	22–9	11–5	2nd	
2007–08	UCF	16–15	9–7	4th	
2008–09	UCF*	17–14*	7–9*	6th*	
2009–10	UCF*	15–17*	6–10*	9th*	
UCF:		279–233* (.545)	158–128* (.552)		
Total:		279–233* (.545)			
National champion Postseason invitational champion Conference regular season champion Conference regular season and conference tournament champion Division regular season champion Division regular season and conference tournament champion Conference tournament champion

* UCF had its wins from the 2008–09 and 2009–10 seasons vacated after it was ruled that there was ineligible player for the Knights.

== Personal life ==
Speraw is married and has four children.
