= 2008–09 UCF Knights men's basketball team =

American college basketball season

2008–09 UCF Knights men's basketball

UCF Holiday Classic Champions (vacated)
- Conference: Conference USA
- Record: 0–14 (Note: UCF vacated its 17 regular season wins from the 2008–09 season after it was discovered that there was an ineligible player on the team. The team's pre-sanction record was 17–14 (7–9). The "official" record therefore stands as 0–17.) (0–9 C-USA)
- Head coach: Kirk Speraw
- Assistant coaches: Mike Jaskulski; Craig Brown; Robert McCullum
- Home arena: UCF Arena

2008–09 Conference USA men's basketball standings
| | Conf. | | | | Overall |
| Team | W | | L | PCT | W | | L | PCT |
|---|---|---|---|---|---|---|---|---|
| No. 3 Memphis † | 16 | – | 0 | 1.000 | 33 | – | 4 | .892 |
| Tulsa | 12 | – | 4 | .750 | 25 | – | 11 | .694 |
| UAB | 11 | – | 5 | .688 | 22 | – | 12 | .647 |
| Houston | 10 | – | 6 | .625 | 21 | – | 12 | .636 |
| UTEP | 10 | – | 6 | .625 | 23 | – | 14 | .622 |
| Marshall | 7 | – | 9 | .438 | 15 | – | 17 | .469 |
| Tulane | 7 | – | 9 | .438 | 14 | – | 17 | .452 |
| East Carolina | 5 | – | 11 | .313 | 13 | – | 17 | .433 |
| Southern Miss | 4 | – | 12 | .250 | 15 | – | 17 | .469 |
| Rice | 4 | – | 12 | .250 | 10 | – | 22 | .313 |
| SMU | 3 | – | 13 | .188 | 9 | – | 21 | .300 |
| UCF | 0 | – | 9 | .000 | 0 | – | 14 | .000 |
† 2009 CUSA Tournament winner As of April 1, 2009; Rankings from AP Poll; *UCF vacated its wins from the 2008–09 season after it was discovered that there was an ineligible player on the team.

The 2008–09 UCF Knights men's basketball team was an NCAA Division I college basketball team that represented the University of Central Florida and competed in Conference USA. They played their home games at the UCF Arena in Orlando, Florida, and were led by head coach Kirk Speraw, who was in his 16th season with the team. In the previous year, the Knights finished the season 16–15, 9–7 in C-USA play.

In February 2012, UCF vacated its wins from the 2008–09 season after it was discovered that there was an ineligible player on the team. The team's pre-sanction record was 17–14 (7–9). The "official" record stands as 0–14.

== Roster ==
| Name | Number | Position | Height | Weight | Year | Hometown |
|---|---|---|---|---|---|---|
| David Diakite | 15 | G/F | 6–6 | 205 | Freshman | Washington, D.C. |
| P.J. Gaynor | 21 | F | 6–7 | 200 | Freshman | Jacksonville, Florida |
| Jakub Kusmieruk | 13 | C | 7–4 | 300 | Freshman | Sokołów Podlaski, Poland |
| A.J. Rompza | 3 | G | 5–9 | 160 | Freshman | Chicago, Illinois |
| Isaac Sosa | 11 | G | 6–3 | 180 | Freshman | Guaynabo, Puerto Rico |
| Drew Speraw | 10 | G | 6–2 | 175 | Junior | Oviedo, Florida |
| Jermaine Taylor | 1 | G | 6–4 | 215 | Senior | Tavares, Florida |
| Amara Thompson | 22 | G | 6–4 | 180 | Freshman | Tucker, Georgia |
| A.J. Tyler | 25 | F | 6–9 | 225 | Sophomore | Palm Harbor, Florida |
| Jean Michel Yotio | 34 | F/C | 6–9 | 235 | Sophomore | Abidjan, Ivory Coast |
| Taylor Young | 12 | G | 6–1 | 195 | Sophomore | Orlando, Florida |
| Kenrick Zondervan | 13 | F/C | 6–9 | 240 | Senior | Hoofddorp, Holland |

=== Coaches ===
| Name | Type | College | Graduating year |
|---|---|---|---|
| Kirk Speraw | Head coach | University of Iowa | 1980 |
| Mike Jaskulski | Associate head coach | St. Norbert | 1976 |
| Craig Brown | Assistant coach | University of Florida | 1995 |
| Micah Byars | Director of basketball operations | University of West Florida | 2006 |

== Schedule and results ==
| Date time, TV | Rank^{#} | Opponent^{#} | Result | Record | Site city, state |
Exhibition
| November 11, 2008*; 7:00 pm | | Flagler | W 76–56 | 1–0 | UCF Arena; Orlando, FL |
Regular season (non-conference play)
| November 16, 2008*; 1:00 pm | | North Carolina A&T | W 81–62 | 1–0 | UCF Arena (3,508); Orlando, FL |
| November 18, 2008*; 8:00 pm | | at Valparaiso | L 52–69 | 1–1 | Athletics–Recreation Center (2,764); Valparaiso, IN |
| November 22, 2008*; 9:00 pm | | at New Mexico | W 72–71 | 2–1 | The Pit Arena (12,707); Albuquerque, NM |
| November 26, 2008*; 7:00 pm | | at Ole Miss | L 46–78 | 2–2 | Tad Smith Coliseum (6,007); Oxford, MS |
| November 29, 2008*; 4:30 pm | | vs. South Dakota State; Cancún Challenge | W 66–64 | 3–2 | Moon Palace Resort (134); Cancún, MX |
| November 30, 2008*; 5:00 pm | | vs. Morehead State; Cancún Challenge | L 65–71 | 3–3 | Moon Palace Resort (192); Cancún, MX |
| December 6, 2008*; 7:00 pm | | South Florida; UCF–USF rivalry | W 71–63 | 4–3 | UCF Arena (6,695); Orlando, FL |
| December 12, 2008*; 7:00 pm | | Florida Tech | W 110–68 | 5–3 | UCF Arena (3,502); Orlando, FL |
| December 20, 2008*; 6:30 pm | | vs. Florida | L 61–89 | 5–4 | Veterans Memorial Arena (5,175); Jacksonville, FL |
| December 22, 2008*; 7:00 pm | | Valparaiso | W 85–60 | 6–4 | UCF Arena (3,170); Orlando, FL |
| December 29, 2008*; 7:00 pm | | Penn; UCF Holiday Classic | W 81–64 | 7–4 | UCF Arena (3,340); Orlando, FL |
| December 30, 2008*; 7:00 pm | | Chicago State; UCF Holiday Classic | W 89–75 | 8–4 | UCF Arena (2,966); Orlando, FL |
| January 3, 2009*; 7:00 pm | | Holy Cross | W 85–70 | 9–4 | UCF Arena (2,456); Orlando, FL |
| January 6, 2009*; 7:00 pm | | Sam Houston State | W 70–57 | 10–4 | UCF Arena (3,004); Orlando, FL |
Regular season (conference play)
| January 10, 2009; 5:00 pm, no | | Memphis | L 66–73 | 10–5 (0–1) | UCF Arena (9,825); Orlando, FL |
| January 13, 2009; 8:00 pm | | at UAB | L 52–60 | 10–6 (0–2) | Bartow Arena (4,321); Birmingham, AL |
| January 17, 2009; 4:00 pm | | at Rice | W 77–52 | 11–6 (1–2) | Tudor Fieldhouse (1,567); Houston, TX |
| January 21, 2009; 7:00 pm | | Southern Miss | W 73–61 | 12–6 (2–2) | UCF Arena (3,860); Orlando, FL |
| January 25, 2009; 2:00 pm | | Marshall | W 87–69 | 13–6 (3–2) | UCF Arena (4,845); Orlando, FL |
| January 28, 2009; 7:00 pm | | SMU | W 70–45 | 14–6 (4–2) | UCF Arena (4,301); Orlando, FL |
| January 31, 2009; 2:00 pm | | at Tulane | W 79–74 | 15–6 (5–2) | Fogelman Arena (2,313); New Orleans, LA |
| February 4, 2009; 7:00 pm | | Houston | L 69–97 | 15–7 (5–3) | UCF Arena (5,868); Orlando, FL |
| February 7, 2009; 7:00 pm | | at East Carolina | L 75–89 | 15–8 (5–4) | Minges Coliseum (5,559); Greenville, NC |
| February 11, 2009; 7:00 pm | | at UTEP | L 68–73 | 15–9 (5–5) | Don Haskins Center (7,020); El Paso, TX |
| February 14, 2009; 7:00 pm | | Tulsa | W 74–72 | 16–9 (6–5) | UCF Arena (4,106); Orlando, FL |
| February 21, 2009; 7:00 pm | | at Houston | L 72–77 | 16–10 (6–6) | Hofheinz Pavilion (3,816); Houston, TX |
| February 25, 2009; 7:00 pm | | Rice | L 66–69 | 16–11 (6–7) | UCF Arena (4,010); Orlando, FL |
| February 28, 2009; 7:00 pm | | at Marshall | L 62–67 | 16–12 (6–8) | Cam Henderson Center (6,143); Huntington, WV |
| March 4, 2009; 7:00 pm | | at Tulsa | L 70–79 | 16–13 (6–9) | Reynolds Center (6,178); Tulsa, OK |
| March 7, 2009; 7:00 pm | | East Carolina | W 74–71 | 17–13 (7–9) | UCF Arena (4,788); Orlando, FL |
Conference USA tournament
| March 11, 2009 | | vs. Southern Miss | L 53–77 | 17–14 | FedEx Forum (9,730); Memphis, TN |
*Non-conference game. Rankings from AP poll. All times are in Eastern Time.
