= Wesley Witherspoon =

American basketball player (born 1990)

Personal information
- Born: January 27, 1990 (age 36) Atlanta, Georgia, U.S.
- Listed height: 6 ft 9 in (2.06 m)
- Listed weight: 206 lb (93 kg)

Career information
- High school: Berkmar (Lilburn, Georgia)
- College: Memphis (2008–2012)
- NBA draft: 2012: undrafted
- Playing career: 2012–2016
- Position: Small forward / shooting guard

Career history
- 2012–2013: Rio Grande Valley Vipers
- 2013: Erie BayHawks
- 2013: Nantes
- 2014: Air21 Express
- 2014: Helsinki Seagulls
- 2015: Shimane Susanoo Magic
- 2015: Bambitious Nara
- 2015–2016: Guaiqueríes de Margarita

Wesley Arrington Witherspoon (born January 27, 1990) is an American former professional basketball player. He played college basketball for the University of Memphis Tigers.

== Career ==
He was on the San Antonio Spurs roster, but did not play a game for them.

In 2014, Witherspoon was picked to play for the Air21 Express of the Philippine Basketball Association.

Witherspoon was signed for Helsinki Seagulls in September 2014 to play in Korisliiga, the top tier of Finnish basketball. Also rated in the top 100 shooters in the world for players 6'9" or above.

== The Basketball Tournament ==
Wesley Witherspoon played for Team Memphis State in the 2018 edition of The Basketball Tournament. He averaged 7.0 points per game, 1.5 rebounds per game and 1.0 assists per game. Team Memphis State reached the second round before falling to Team DRC.
