= 2024–25 UCF Knights men's basketball team =

American college basketball season

2024–25 UCF Knights men's basketball

College Basketball Crown, Runners-up
- Conference: Big 12 Conference
- Record: 20–17 (7–13 Big 12)
- Head coach: Johnny Dawkins (9th season)
- Assistant coaches: Robbie Laing (9th season); Mamadou N'Diaye (4th season); Tyson Waterman (2nd season); Adam Hood (1st season)
- Home arena: Addition Financial Arena

2024–25 Big 12 men's basketball standings
	Conf.				Overall
Team	W		L	PCT	W		L	PCT
No. 2 Houston †	19	–	1	.950	35	–	5	.875
No. 8 Texas Tech	15	–	5	.750	28	–	9	.757
No. 15 Arizona	14	–	6	.700	24	–	13	.649
No. 13 BYU	14	–	6	.700	26	–	10	.722
No. 17 Iowa State	13	–	7	.650	25	–	10	.714
Kansas	11	–	9	.550	21	–	13	.618
Baylor	10	–	10	.500	20	–	15	.571
West Virginia	10	–	10	.500	19	–	13	.594
TCU	9	–	11	.450	16	–	16	.500
Kansas State	9	–	11	.450	16	–	17	.485
Utah	8	–	12	.400	16	–	17	.485
Oklahoma State	7	–	13	.350	17	–	18	.486
Cincinnati	7	–	13	.350	19	–	16	.543
UCF	7	–	13	.350	20	–	17	.541
Arizona State	4	–	16	.200	13	–	20	.394
Colorado	3	–	17	.150	14	–	21	.400
† 2025 Big 12 tournament winner Rankings from AP poll

The 2024–25 UCF Knights men's basketball team represented the University of Central Florida during the 2024–25 NCAA Division I men's basketball season, marking their second season as members of the Big 12 Conference. The Knights, in the program's 56th season of basketball, were led by ninth-year head coach Johnny Dawkins and played their home games at the Addition Financial Arena.

== Previous season ==
The Knights finished the 2023–24 season 17–16, 7–11 in Big 12 Play to finish in a tie for 11th place. They defeated Oklahoma State in the first round of the Big 12 Tournament before losing in the second round to BYU. The Knights received an at-large bid to the NIT, where they were defeated by South Florida in the first round.

== Preseason ==
Big 12 Preseason Poll

	Big 12 coaches	Points
1.	Kansas	215 (9)
2.	Houston	211 (5)
3.	Iowa State	194 (1)
4.	Baylor	185
5.	Arizona	179 (1)
6.	Cincinnati	140
7.	Texas Tech	135
8.	Kansas State	133
9.	BYU	116
10.	TCU	90
11.	UCF	83
12.	Arizona State	64
13.	West Virginia	62
14.	Oklahoma State	46
15.	Colorado	37
16.	Utah	30
Reference: (#) first-place votes

Pre-Season All-Big 12 Team

First Team

Player	School
Caleb Love	Arizona
LJ Cryer	Houston
J’Wan Roberts	Houston
Tamin Lipsey	Iowa State
Hunter Dickinson†	Kansas
† denotes unanimous selection Reference:

Second Team

Player	School
Norchad Omier	Baylor
Jeremy Roach	Baylor
Keshon Gilbert	Iowa State
Dajuan Harris Jr	Kansas
Coleman Hawkins	Kansas State
† denotes unanimous selection Reference:

- Player of the Year: Hunter Dickinson, Kansas
- Co-Newcomer of the Year: Jeremy Roach, Baylor & Coleman Hawkins, Kansas State
- Freshman of the Year: V. J. Edgecombe, Baylor

== Roster ==
2024–25 UCF Knights men's basketball team
Players
Coaches

Pos.	#	Name	Height	Weight	Year	Previous school	Hometown
G	0	Jordan Ivy-Curry (5Y)	6 ft 3 in (1.91 m)	177 lb (80 kg)	Sr	UTSA	La Marque, Texas
G	1	Mikey Williams	6 ft 3 in (1.91 m)	193 lb (88 kg)	RS Fr	Memphis	San Diego, California
F	2	JJ Taylor	6 ft 8 in (2.03 m)	196 lb (89 kg)	So	Memphis	Chicago, Illinois
G	3	Darius Johnson	6 ft 1 in (1.85 m)	200 lb (91 kg)	Sr	Episcopal High School	Boyds, Maryland
G/F	4	Keyshawn Hall	6 ft 7 in (2.01 m)	235 lb (107 kg)	Jr	George Mason	Cleveland, Ohio
F	5	Benny Williams	6 ft 10 in (2.08 m)	217 lb (98 kg)	Sr	Syracuse	Bowie, Maryland
G	6	Dallan "Deebo" Coleman	6 ft 6 in (1.98 m)	220 lb (100 kg)	Sr	Georgia Tech	Memphis, Tennessee
G	7	Dior Johnson	6 ft 3 in (1.91 m)	182 lb (83 kg)	RS So	Clarendon College	Kingston, New York
C	8	Elijah Hulsewe	7 ft 0 in (2.13 m)	270 lb (122 kg)	Jr	Bethune–Cookman	Orlando, Florida
G	11	Cameron Simpson	6 ft 7 in (2.01 m)	180 lb (82 kg)	Fr	Oak Ridge High School	Orlando, Florida
G	15	Tyler Hendricks	6 ft 6 in (1.98 m)	190 lb (86 kg)	RS So	Calvary Christian Academy	Fort Lauderdale, Florida
G	20	Poohpha Warakulnukroh	5 ft 11 in (1.8 m)	177 lb (80 kg)	RS Jr	Montverde Academy	Bangkok, Thailand
G	22	Nils Machowski	6 ft 3 in (1.91 m)	183 lb (83 kg)	So	Paul-Natorp Gymnasium	Berlin, Germany
G	24	Jaylin Sellers	6 ft 4 in (1.93 m)	205 lb (93 kg)	Sr	Ball State	Columbus, Georgia
F	35	Rokas Jocius	6 ft 10 in (2.08 m)	240 lb (109 kg)	Jr	La Salle	Kaunas, Lithuania
C	52	Moustapha Thiam	7 ft 2 in (2.18 m)	235 lb (107 kg)	Fr	DME Academy	Dakar, Senegal

Head coach

- Johnny Dawkins (Duke)

Assistant coach(es)

- Robbie Laing (Troy)
- Mamadou N'Diaye (Auburn)
- Tyson Waterman (Winthrop)
- Adam Hood (Air Force)

Legend

- (C) Team captain
- (S) Suspended
- (I) Ineligible
- (W) Walk-on
- (5Y) Fifth-year senior
- Injured
- Current redshirt

Roster
Last update: December 6, 2024

== Schedule and results ==
Date time, TV	Rank^{#}	Opponent^{#}	Result	Record	High points	High rebounds	High assists	Site (attendance) city, state
Exhibition
October 20, 2024*		Florida Gulf Coast	W 92–78		–	–	–	Addition Financial Arena; Orlando, FL
October 29, 2024*; 7:00 p.m.		at Georgia	L 76–114		–	–	–	Stegeman Coliseum; Athens, GA
Non-conference regular season
November 4, 2024*; 7:00 p.m., ESPN+		No. 13 Texas A&M	W 64–61	1–0	24 – Da. Johnson	5 – Ivy-Curry	5 – Da. Johnson	Addition Financial Arena (8,808); Orlando, FL
November 8, 2024*; 7:00 p.m., ESPN+		Purdue Fort Wayne	W 75–68	2–0	18 – Ivy-Curry	12 – Hall	5 – Da. Johnson	Addition Financial Arena (7,768); Orlando, FL
November 12, 2024*; 7:00 p.m., ESPN+		Florida Atlantic	W 100–94	3–0	26 – Hall	8 – B. Williams	5 – Tied	Addition Financial Arena (8,302); Orlando, FL
November 19, 2024*; 7:00 p.m., ESPN+		Tennessee Tech; Greenbrier Tip-Off campus game	W 80–69	4–0	20 – Hall	6 – Da. Johnson	5 – Hall	Addition Financial Arena (7,522); Orlando, FL
November 22, 2024*; 5:00 p.m., CBSSN		vs. No. 19 Wisconsin; Greenbrier Tip-Off Mountain Division semifinals	L 70–86	4–1	13 – Ivy-Curry	9 – Taylor	4 – Di. Johnson	Colonial Hall (1,112); White Sulphur Springs, WV
November 24, 2024*; 3:00 p.m., CBSSN		vs. LSU; Greenbrier Tip-Off Mountain Division third place game	L 102–109 ^{3OT}	4–2	25 – Da. Johnson	10 – Hall	8 – Da. Johnson	Colonial Hall (1,112); White Sulphur Springs, WV
November 27, 2024*; 7:00 p.m., ESPN+		Milwaukee	W 84–76	5–2	28 – Da. Johnson	5 – Tied	4 – B. Williams	Addition Financial Arena (6,027); Orlando, FL
December 1, 2024*; 4:00 p.m., ESPN+		California Baptist	W 74–59	6–2	15 – Hall	7 – Thiam	5 – Ivy-Curry	Addition Financial Arena (5,817); Orlando, FL
December 8, 2024*; 4:00 p.m., ESPN+		Tarleton State	W 66–51	7–2	16 – Ivy-Curry	9 – Thiam	7 – Da. Johnson	Addition Financial Arena (5,859); Orlando, FL
December 14, 2024*; 2:00 p.m., ESPNU		vs. Tulsa; Orange Bowl Basketball Classic	W 88–75	8–2	20 – Coleman	9 – Coleman	4 – Ivy-Curry	Amerant Bank Arena (7,866); Sunrise, FL
December 21, 2024*; 6:00 p.m., ESPN+		Jacksonville	W 86–66	9–2	21 – Hall	6 – Da. Johnson	4 – Hall	Addition Financial Arena (6,155); Orlando, FL
Big 12 regular season
December 31, 2024; 2:00 p.m., ESPN+		at Texas Tech	W 87–83	10–2 (1–0)	24 – Da. Johnson	8 – Hall	4 – Da. Johnson	United Supermarkets Arena (12,767); Lubbock, TX
January 5, 2025; 4:00 p.m., ESPN+		No. 7 Kansas	L 48–99	10–3 (1–1)	12 – Hall	6 – Hall	3 – B. Williams	Addition Financial Arena (9,669); Orlando, FL
January 8, 2025; 7:00 p.m., ESPN+		Colorado	W 75–74	11–3 (2–1)	22 – Ivy-Curry	7 – Hall	4 – Ivy-Curry	Addition Financial Arena (8,204); Orlando, FL
January 11, 2025; 10:00 p.m., ESPN		at Arizona	L 80–88	11–4 (2–2)	22 – Hall	10 – Thiam	5 – Hall	McKale Center (13,039); Tucson, AZ
January 14, 2025; 11:00 p.m., ESPNU		at Arizona State	W 95–89	12–4 (3–2)	40 – Hall	9 – Taylor	7 – Da. Johnson	Desert Financial Arena (8,337); Tempe, AZ
January 18, 2025; 12:00 p.m., CBSSN		No. 10 Houston	L 68–69	12–5 (3–3)	18 – Thiam	11 – Hall	4 – Da. Johnson	Addition Financial Arena (9,014); Orlando, FL
January 21, 2025; 8:00 p.m., ESPN+		at No. 3 Iowa State	L 83–108	12–6 (3–4)	24 – Ivy-Curry	9 – Thiam	3 – Tied	Hilton Coliseum (14,267); Ames, IA
January 25, 2025; 4:00 p.m., ESPN+		TCU	W 85–58	13–6 (4–4)	26 – Hall	8 – Hall	5 – Da. Johnson	Addition Financial Arena (8,003); Orlando, FL
January 28, 2025; 8:00 p.m., ESPN+		at No. 11 Kansas	L 87–91	13–7 (4–5)	34 – Hall	7 – Tied	8 – Ivy-Curry	Allen Fieldhouse (15,300); Lawrence, KS
February 1, 2025; 4:00 p.m., ESPN+		BYU	L 75–81	13–8 (4–6)	20 – Hall	8 – Hall	3 – Hall	Addition Financial Arena (9,152); Orlando, FL
February 5, 2025; 7:00 p.m., CBSSN		Cincinnati	L 83–93	13–9 (4–7)	23 – Hall	8 – Thaim	6 – Da. Johnson	Addition Financial Arena (7,421); Orlando, FL
February 8, 2025; 2:00 p.m., ESPN+		at Baylor	L 76–91	13–10 (4–8)	19 – Hall	8 – Hall	5 – Da. Johnson	Foster Pavilion (7,500); Waco, TX
February 11, 2025; 7:00 p.m., ESPN+		No. 10 Iowa State	L 65–77	13–11 (4–9)	22 – Hall	10 – Thiam	4 – Da. Johnson	Addition Financial Arena (8,614); Orlando, FL
February 15, 2025; 3:00 p.m., ESPN+		at Colorado	L 63–76	13–12 (4–10)	19 – Hall	9 – Hall	2 – Machowski	CU Events Center (7,212); Boulder, CO
February 19, 2025; 9:00 p.m., ESPNU		at Oklahoma State	L 95–104	13–13 (4–11)	34 – Hall	7 – Williams	9 – Da. Johnson	Gallagher-Iba Arena (5,122); Stillwater, OK
February 23, 2025; 4:00 p.m., ESPN+		Utah	W 76–72	14–13 (5–11)	18 – Thiam	9 – Thiam	5 – Da. Johnson	Addition Financial Arena (6,379); Orlando, FL
February 26, 2025; 7:00 p.m., ESPN+		Kansas State	W 80–76	15–13 (6–11)	26 – Hall	10 – Thiam	4 – Da. Johnson	Addition Financial Arena (7,003); Orlando, FL
March 1, 2025; 3:00 p.m., ESPN+		at TCU	L 77–88	15–14 (6–12)	20 – Da. Johnson	13 – Hall	4 – Tied	Schollmaier Arena (5,477); Fort Worth, TX
March 5, 2025; 7:00 p.m., ESPN+		Oklahoma State	W 83–70	16–14 (7–12)	36 – Da. Johnson	9 – Hall	5 – Tied	Addition Financial Arena (7,116); Orlando, FL
March 8, 2025; 5:00 p.m., ESPN+		at West Virginia	L 65–72	16–15 (7–13)	17 – Da. Johnson	10 – Coleman	3 – Johnson	WVU Coliseum (12,523); Morgantown, WV
Big 12 tournament
March 11, 2025; 9:30 p.m., ESPN+	(14)	vs. (11) Utah; First round	W 87–72	17–15	23 – Hall	11 – Thiam	5 – Tied	T-Mobile Center (12,929); Kansas City, MO
March 12, 2025; 9:30 p.m., ESPN2	(14)	vs. (6) Kansas; Second round	L 94–98 ^{OT}	17–16	25 – Hall	11 – Hall	7 – Johnson	T-Mobile Center (15,431); Kansas City, MO
College Basketball Crown
April 1, 2025*; 5:30 p.m., FS1		vs. Oregon State; First round	W 76–75	18–16	15 – Tied	10 – Hendricks	4 – Da. Johnson	MGM Grand Garden Arena (1,495); Paradise, NV
April 3, 2025*; 7:00 p.m., FS1		vs. Cincinnati; Quarterfinals	W 88–80	19–16	31 – Da. Johnson	6 – Coleman	7 – Da. Johnson	MGM Grand Garden Arena (2,279); Paradise, NV
April 5, 2025*; 4:00 p.m., FOX		vs. Villanova; Semifinals	W 104–98 ^{OT}	20–16	42 – Da. Johnson	8 – Hendricks	7 – Da. Johnson	T-Mobile Arena (2,972); Paradise, NV
April 6, 2025*; 5:30 p.m., FOX		vs. Nebraska; Championship	L 66–77	20–17	29 – Ivy-Curry	11 – Thiam	2 – Tied	T-Mobile Arena (3,314); Paradise, NV
*Non-conference game. ^{#}Rankings from AP poll. (#) Tournament seedings in parentheses. All times are in Eastern Time.

== Rankings ==
Ranking movements Legend: ██ Increase in ranking ██ Decrease in ranking — = Not ranked RV = Received votes
	Week																				
Poll	Pre	1	2	3	4	5	6	7	8	9	10	11	12	13	14	15	16	17	18	19	Final
AP	—	RV	RV	—	—	—	—	—	—	—	—	—	—	—	—	—	—	—	—	—	—
Coaches	—	RV	RV	—	—	—	—	—	—	—	—	—	—	—	—	—	—	—	—	—	—
