= Torchy Clark =

American basketball coach

Biographical details
- Born: January 1, 1929; Oshkosh, Wisconsin, U.S.
- Died: April 22, 2009 (aged 80); Orlando, Florida, U.S.

Coaching career (HC unless noted)
- 1969–1983: UCF

Head coaching record
- Overall: 274–89

Accomplishments and honors

Championships
- 5 Sunshine State regular season (1976–1978, 1981, 1982); Sunshine State tournament (1978)

Awards
- 4× Sunshine State Coach of the Year; Sunshine State Coach of the Decade

Records
- Most wins in UCF history (274)

Eugene "Torchy" Clark (January 1, 1929 – April 22, 2009) was an American college basketball coach. He was the first head coach of the UCF Knights men's basketball team that represents the University of Central Florida in Orlando, Florida. Then named Florida Technological University, Clark served as the university's head basketball coach from 1969 to 1983.

During his 14-year tenure at UCF, Clark never had a losing season, and built the Knights into a national power, leading the team to five Sunshine State Conference regular season championships, one conference tournament championship and six NCAA tournament appearances in eight years. In 1978, Clark led the Knights, which at the time were riding a 24–game winning streak, to the Final Four. During his tenure, the Knights were ranked in the top 10 nationally for seven consecutive years.

== Coaching career ==
Clark served as UCF's, at the time FTU's, first head basketball coach. In 1969, Clark, who was a Wisconsin high school coach, was responsible for starting the university's basketball program from scratch. In their first year, as a club level team, the Knights went 11–3, including a 99–38 victory in their first game over Massey Tech. The first season would serve as an omen for UCF basketball, with Clark bringing the university unprecedented success as a Division II team.

As the Knights head coach, Clark earned Sunshine State Coach of the Year honors four times and won the conference's coach of the decade award. While at UCF, Clark coached both of his sons, Bo and Mike. All three men are members of the UCF Athletic Hall of Fame, and Clark is a member of the Sunshine State Conference Hall of Fame. Bo is the Knight's all-time leading scorer with Mike second on the list, and as a freshman in 1976 Bo was the nation's leading scorer. The father-son duo were featured in a 1979 Sports Illustrated issue.

Clark coached his last game as a Knight on February 26, 1983, with UCF falling to Florida Southern. During his tenure, Clark's squads went 274–89, winning 20 or more games in a season seven times. In the decade after Clark retired, the Knights had only one winning season, the year after he left.

Before coaching men's college basketball, Clark was the basketball coach at Xavier High School in Appleton, Wisconsin. Among the players he coached there was Bob "Rocky" Bleier, who later overcame debilitating war wounds suffered in the Vietnam War to become running back for the Pittsburgh Steelers, and earn four Super Bowl rings. Under Clark, the Xavier varsity basketball team had a run almost every year in the Wisconsin Catholic Interscholastic Athletic Association State Championships.

Xavier opened its doors for the first time in the fall of 1959, and as a young man Eugene 'moved' from St. Mary's Grade School in Appleton to become the first head coach for the football and basketball teams. He also coached the boys' tennis teams and was the athletic director at XHS. He established a sporting tradition that still makes the school widely respected in athletic circles.

He coached 10 seasons at Xavier (the 1959 football season was against JV teams as the school opened with only freshmen and sophomores, and, XHS joined a conference in '61). XHS won seven conference championships in eight years in football, and they won eight conference titles in as many seasons in basketball. His record for football and basketball at Xavier was 277-35-2, an 88% win rate over 10 years.

His basketball teams went to the State Tournament in Milwaukee six times in nine years, and the Hawks returned to Appleton with a trophy each time: Xavier won the State Title in 1963, was 2nd in '64, was 4th once, and claimed 3 Consolation honors. A then-single-game-record-crowd of 7,095 witnessed the '63 state finals, eager to see Xavier top Marquette High, 71-66, in a raucous, 'mostly-blue' Milwaukee Arena.

His basketball teams won 49 straight games. Their shot at a 50th win and the ’64 state title came up short against Marinette Central & Coach Marty Crowe, 43-37. Torchy's teams also had a 62-game regular season win streak before Chicago St. Pat's put an end to that string, 66-54, in the XHS gym.

The post-season Football Playoffs in Wisconsin did not start until 1969—after Clark left Xavier for a college coaching position in Florida.

The gym at Xavier was dedicated in honor of Torchy Clark on Saturday, Feb. 21, 2004. Many alumni came back for the special night, including Rocky Bleier, who introduced Coach Clark. The MC for the event was Peter Bates, Xavier Class of 1979 and the Voice of the Hawks for XHS athletic events for 30 years.

His football teams posted a record of 69-9-2 overall, as 3 times XHS was 9-0 and 3 times was 8-1. Xavier shut out its opponents in nearly 50% of their games, as the Hawks averaged 27 points per game and allowed just 6 points a game over 9 football seasons. The ’62 and '63 teams were rated # 1 Catholic School in the state by the Associated Press.

His basketball teams were 208-26, and after his first two years never had more than 3 losses in any of 8 straight seasons. XHS was undefeated in 6 seasons at home, and in two other seasons had just one loss at home – as his home-court advantage was 95-7 over 10 seasons. The Hawks outscored opponents in those 10 years by an average of 70.7 points to 50.7 points per game.

He was inducted into the Hall of Fame for the Wisconsin Basketball Coaches Association in 1981, and Torchy was the first Xavier coach to be so honored.

Torchy died April 22, 2009 after a battle with cancer. His wife had died two years earlier.

== Head coaching record ==
Record table
Season	Team	Overall	Conference	Standing	Postseason
FTU Knights (Independent) (1969–1975)
1969–70	FTU	11–3			
1970–71	FTU	17–9			
1971–72	FTU	20–6			
1972–73	FTU	19–7			
1973–74	FTU	16–8			
1974–75	FTU	14–10			
FTU / UCF Knights (Sunshine State Conference) (1975–1983)
1975–76	FTU	20–5	10–0	1st	NCAA Division II First Round
1976–77	FTU	24–4	8–2	1st	NCAA Division II Sweet 16
1977–78	FTU	26–4	10–0	1st	NCAA Division II Fourth Place
1978–79	UCF	19–7	7–3	2nd	
1979–80	UCF	25–4	8–2	2nd	NCAA Division II Sweet 16
1980–81	UCF	23–5	9–1	1st	NCAA Division II Sweet 16
1981–82	UCF	21–8	9–3	1st	NCAA Division II First Round
1982–83	UCF	19–9	10–2	2nd	
UCF:		274–89	71–13		
Total:		274–89			
National champion Postseason invitational champion Conference regular season champion Conference regular season and conference tournament champion Division regular season champion Division regular season and conference tournament champion Conference tournament champion
