= 1996 TAAC men's basketball tournament =

- Classification: Division I
- Season: 1995–96
- Teams: 8
- Site: Edmunds Center; DeLand, FL
- Champions: Central Florida (2nd title)
- Winning coach: Kirk Speraw (2nd title)
- MVP: Harry Kennedy (Central Florida)
- TAAC men's basketball tournaments

1995–96 Trans America Athletic Conference men's basketball standings
	Conf.				Overall
Team	W		L	PCT	W		L	PCT
East
College of Charleston	15	–	1	.938	25	–	4	.862
Campbell	11	–	5	.688	17	–	11	.607
Florida International	6	–	10	.375	13	–	15	.464
Stetson	6	–	10	.375	10	–	17	.370
Central Florida †	6	–	10	.375	11	–	19	.367
Florida Atlantic	5	–	11	.313	9	–	18	.333
West
Samford	11	–	5	.688	16	–	11	.593
Southeastern Louisiana	11	–	5	.688	15	–	12	.556
Centenary	8	–	8	.500	11	–	16	.407
Mercer	7	–	9	.438	15	–	14	.517
Georgia State	6	–	10	.375	10	–	16	.385
Jacksonville State	4	–	12	.250	10	–	17	.370
† 1996 TAAC tournament winner Rankings from AP poll

The 1996 Trans America Athletic Conference men's basketball tournament (now known as the ASUN men's basketball tournament) was held February 29–March 2 at the Edmunds Center at Stetson University in DeLand, Florida.

Central Florida defeated Mercer in the championship game, 86–77, to win their second TAAC/Atlantic Sun men's basketball tournament.

The Golden Knights, therefore, received the TAAC's automatic bid to the 1996 NCAA tournament, where they lost to UMass in the first round.

== Format ==
Prior to the season, the TAAC added one more team, Jacksonville State, to reach a total of 12 teams. For conference scheduling, these teams were separated into two six-team divisions. However, only the top eight teams in the standings, regardless of conference, were invited to participate in the tournament.

College of Charleston, despite finishing at the top of the conference standings, were not able to participate as a transitioning Division I member.

== Bracket ==
Quarterfinals; Thursday, February 29
1	Samford	55
8	Florida International	58
5	Mercer	72
4	Centenary	61
3	SE Louisiana	80
6	Central Florida	83
7	Stetson	59
2	Campbell	67

Semifinals; Friday, March 1
8	Florida International	76
5	Mercer	101
6	Central Florida	80
2	Campbell	71

Championship; Saturday, March 2
5	Mercer	77
6	Central Florida	86
