= Bo Clark =

American college basketball coach and author

Biographical details
- Born: April 24, 1957 (age 69); Appleton, Wisconsin

Playing career
- 1975–1980: UCF
- Position: Shooting guard

Coaching career (HC unless noted)
- 1982–1984: Flagler
- 1984–1987: Winter Park HS
- 1987–1988: St. Johns River State
- 1988–2017: Flagler

Head coaching record
- Overall: 491–378 (.565)

Accomplishments and honors

Awards
- No. 23 retired by UCF Knights

James Paul "Bo" Clark (born April 24, 1957) is an American former college basketball player, basketball coach, and author. He played at the University of Central Florida and remains, to this day, the all-time leader in points scored. After graduating, he was hired as the head men's basketball coach at Flagler College, where he coached for 31 years, leading his teams to 491 wins. In his tenure, the Saints qualified for three National Association of Intercollegiate Athletics (NAIA) national basketball tournaments. The court at Flagler is named in his honor. The "Clark Family Court" was dedicated on February 18, 2017.

== Early life ==
Born in Appleton, Wis., he is the son of former Xavier High School (Appleton, Wis.) and University of Central Florida basketball coaching legend, Gene "Torchy" Clark. The younger Clark played for his father at UCF and was a three-time NCAA Division II All-American. He is the school's all-time leading scorer with 2,886 points. On January 30, 1977, Clark scored 70 points in a game against Florida Memorial University. He also played one season for Athletes In Action USA (1980–81). Clark's No. 23 jersey is retired at both Bishop Moore Catholic High School, in Orlando, Fla., and at UCF.

== Honors ==
=== High school ===
- 3× Florida Class AAA All-State selection at Orlando's Bishop Moore High School (1973–1975)
- All-Central Florida (1974, 1975)
- 3× All-Metro Conference (1973–1975)
- Bishop Moore Catholic Hall of Fame inductee (1992)

=== College ===
- 4× All-Sunshine State Conference (1976, 1977, 1979, 1980)
- UCF's all-time leading scorer (2,886 points) and is first in scoring average (27.8 ppg), field goals (1,215), and field goals attempted (2,418)
- Ranks 15th all-time in NCAA Division II scoring with 2,886 points
- Led NCAA Division II in scoring with 31.6 points per game average (1978–79)
- UCF Hall of Fame inductee (1998)

=== Coaching ===
- 2× NAIA Division II National Tournament Sweet 16 (2002, 2003)
- 2× Florida Sun Conference regular season championships (2002, 2003)
- 2× Florida Sun Conference Tournament championships (2001, 2002)
- 3× Florida Sun Coach of the Year (1995, 2004, 2005)
- Independent College Athletic Association Coach of the Year (2008)
- Flagler College all-time leader in wins (491)
- Flagler Athletics Hall of Fame inductee

== Head coaching record ==
Record table
Season	Team	Overall	Conference	Standing	Postseason
Flagler Saints (NAIA District 25) (1982–1990)
1982–83	Flagler	18–12			NAIA District 25 Toun.
1983–84	Flagler	12–14			
1988–89	Flagler	16–9			
1989–90	Flagler	14–12			
Flagler Saints (Florida Intercollegiate Athletic Conference) (1990–1992)
1990–91	Flagler	19–7			NAIA District 25 Tourn. semis
1991–92	Flagler	19–8			NAIA District 25 Tourn.
Flagler Saints (Florida Sun Conference) (1992–2006)
1992–93	Flagler	8–19	0–14		
1993–94	Flagler	12–16	5–9		
1994–95	Flagler	20–10	9–5		Florida Sun Conf. Tourn.
1995–96	Flagler	22–7	10–4		Florida Sun Conf. Tourn.
1996–97	Flagler	22–9	9–5		Florida Sun Conf. Tourn.
1997–98	Flagler	20–11	7–7		Florida Sun Conf. Tourn.
1998–99	Flagler	16–14	7–7		Florida Sun Conf. Tourn.
1999-00	Flagler	14–16	3–9		Florida Sun Conf. Tourn.
2000–01	Flagler	20–9	9–3		Florida Sun Conf. Tourn.
2001–02	Flagler	24–6	9–3		Florida Sun Conf. Tourn.
2002–03	Flagler	22–8	9–5		NAIA Division II Nationals
2003–04	Flagler	26–6	10–0		NAIA Division II Nationals
2004–05	Flagler	23–8	8–2		NAIA Division II Nationals
2005–06	Flagler	14–14	2–8		Florida Sun Conf. Tourn.
Flagler Saints (NCAA Division II provisional) (2006–2009)
2006–07	Flagler	14–13			National Independent Tourn.
2007–08	Flagler	20–7			
2008–09	Flagler	12–15			
Flagler Saints (Peach Belt Conference) (2009–2017)
2009–10	Flagler	11–16	6–12	5th/East	
2010–11	Flagler	10–16	4–14	6th/East	
2011–12	Flagler	9–17	2–16	7th/East	
2012–13	Flagler	11–15	7–12	5th/East	
2013–14	Flagler	11–15	5–14	T-5th/East	
2015–16	Flagler	8–20	3–16	7th/East	
2016–17	Flagler	10–16	4–15	7th/East	
Total:		491–378			
National champion Postseason invitational champion Conference regular season champion Conference regular season and conference tournament champion Division regular season champion Division regular season and conference tournament champion Conference tournament champion

== Personal life ==
Bo Clark and his wife Nancy (m. 1984), have three sons: JP, David, and Matt. He presently runs youth basketball camps, Bo Clark Basketball Camps, in St. Augustine, Altamonte Springs, and Winter Park, Florida.
