= 1977–78 FTU Knights men's basketball team =

American college basketball season

1977–78 FTU Knights men's basketball

NCAA Final Four (Div. II) SSC Tournament Champions SSC Regular Season Champions Columbus Christmas Tournament Champions

NCAA Div. II Semifinal vs. Cheyney State, L 63–79
- Conference: Sunshine State Conference
- Record: 26–4 (10–0 SSC)
- Head coach: Torchy Clark
- Home arena: Education Gymnasium

The 1977–78 FTU Knights men's basketball team was an NCAA Division II college basketball team that represented Florida Technological University, now named the University of Central Florida. The Knights competed in the Sunshine State Conference (SSC), and played their home games in the university's education gymnasium on FTU's main campus in Orlando, Florida. The team was led by head coach Torchy Clark, who was in his ninth season with the team.

In the previous year, the Knights finished the season 24–4, 8–2 in SSC play. In 1978, Clark led the Knights, which at the time were riding a 24–game winning streak, to a Sunshine State Conference regular season title, the inaugural Sunshine State Conference post-season tournament title, and the NCAA South Regional and the NCAA Quarterfinals titles, en route to the Final Four in Springfield, Missouri. It was one of six tournament appearances that the Knights made between 1976 and 1982. Due to the team's impressive performance, Clark was named the Sunshine State Conference Coach of the Year. To this date, the teams 24–game winning streak and 26 total wins are still program records.

== Schedule and results ==
Date time, TV	Opponent	Result	Record	Site city, state
Regular season
November 30, 1977* no, no	Flagler	W 84–56	1–0	Orlando, FL
December 8, 1977* no, no	Southern Benedictine	W 64–61	2–0	Orlando, FL
December 12, 1977* no, no	at Lamar	L 62–65 ^{OT}	2–1	Beaumont, TX
November 13, 1977* no, no	at Rice Owls	L 63–65	2–2	Houston, TX
December 17, 1977* no, no	Lawrence	W 100–77	3–2	Orlando, FL
December 19, 1977* no, no	vs. Knoxville; Columbus Christmas Tournament	W 95–85	4–2	Columbus, GA
December 20, 1977* no, no	at Columbus; Columbus Christmas Tournament	W 74–62	5–2	Columbus, GA
January 5, 1978* no, no	Edward Waters	W 102–92	6–2	Orlando, FL
January 7, 1978* no, no	UNC–Asheville	W 88–70	7–2	Orlando, FL
January 11, 1978* no, no	Western New England	W 106–79	8–2	Orlando, FL
January 14, 1978* no, no	Florida Memorial	W 106–79	9–2	Orlando, FL
January 17, 1978 no, no	at St. Thomas	W 64–46	10–2 (1–0)	Miami Gardens, FL
January 21, 1978 no, no	at Rollins	W 81–71	11–2 (2–0)	Winter Park, FL
January 24, 1978 no, no	Florida Southern	W 78–75	12–2 (3–0)	Orlando, FL
January 26, 1978* no, no	at South Florida	W 79–57	13–2	Tampa, FL
January 28, 1978 no, no	at Eckerd	W 109–81	14–2 (4–0)	St. Petersburg, FL
January 31, 1978 no, no	Saint Leo	W 68–53	15–2 (5–0)	Orlando, FL
February 2, 1978* no, no	at Flagler	W 88–64	16–2	St. Augustine, FL
February 4, 1978 no, no	St. Thomas	W 76–68	17–2 (6–0)	Orlando, FL
February 8, 1978 no, no	Rollins	W 76–72	18–2 (7–0)	Orlando, FL
February 11, 1978 no, no	at Florida Southern	W 97–90	19–2 (8–0)	Lakeland, FL
February 14, 1978 no, no	Eckerd	W 100–67	20–2 (9–0)	Orlando, FL
February 18, 1978 no, no	at St. Leo	W 79–61	21–2 (10–0)	Saint Leo, FL
Sunshine State Conference Tournament
February 21, 1978 no, no	vs. St. Leo; Semifinals	W 89–60	22–2	Lakeland, FL
February 22, 1978 no, no	vs. Rollins; Championship	W 103–66	23–2	Lakeland, FL
NCAA Tournament
March 3, 1978 no, no	vs. Augusta; First Round	W 86–66	24–2	Orlando, FL
March 4, 1978 no, no	vs. Florida A&M; First Round	W 85–78	25–2	Orlando, FL
March 11, 1978 no, no	vs. San Diego; Quarterfinal	W 77–71	26–2	Orlando, FL
March 17, 1978 no, no	vs. Cheyney State; Semifinal	L 63–79	26–3	Springfield, MO
March 18, 1978 no, no	vs. Eastern Illinois; Third Place	L 67–77	26–4	Springfield, MO
*Non-conference game
