= Keith Clanton =

American professional basketball player

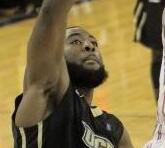

Personal information
- Born: August 18, 1990 (age 36) Orlando, Florida, U.S.
- Listed height: 6 ft 9 in (2.06 m)
- Listed weight: 250 lb (113 kg)

Career information
- High school: Orlando Christian Prep (Orlando, Florida)
- College: UCF (2009–2013)
- NBA draft: 2013: undrafted
- Playing career: 2013–present
- Position: Power forward / center

Career history
- 2013–2014: Anwil Włocławek
- 2014–2015: Seoul Samsung Thunders
- 2015: Leones de Ponce
- 2015–2016: Hapoel Be'er Sheva
- 2016–2017: PAOK
- 2017–2018: Lukoil Academic
- 2018: Levski Sofia
- 2018–2019: Rethymno Cretan Kings
- 2019–2020: Steaua București
- 2020–2021: Passlab Yamagata Wyverns
- 2021–2022: CS Dinamo București
- 2022–2023: Lions de Genève
- 2023–2024: SAM Basket Massagno

Career highlights
- BCL rebounding leader (2017); Bulgarian League champion (2018); Greek League rebounding leader (2017); Greek League blocks leader (2017); BSN champion (2015); First-team All-Conference USA (2012); Second-team All-Conference USA (2013); Conference USA All-Defensive Team (2012); Conference USA All-Freshman Team (2010)
- Stats at Basketball Reference

Keith Clanton (born August 18, 1990) is an American professional basketball player. Standing at 2.06 m (6 ft 9 in), he plays at the power forward and the center positions. After playing four years of college basketball at the University of Central Florida, with the UCF Knights, Clanton entered the 2013 NBA draft, but was not selected in the draft's two rounds.

== High school career ==
Clanton played high school basketball at Orlando Christian Prep, in Orlando, Florida. He was rated as the 60th-best senior in the country according to HoopScoop and finished the season as the 68th-rated senior in the nation according to Scout.com. Clanton averaged 18.2 points, 12.5 rebounds, 3.7 assists and 3.9 blocks per game and led OCP to a 30–2 record and the Florida Class 1A state title.

== College career ==
Clanton played college basketball at the University of Central Florida, with the UCF Knights, from 2009 to 2013. Despite the interest shown from the University of Kentucky, Ohio State, and Florida State in 2012, Clanton chose to stay at Central Florida and complete his studies there.

== Professional career ==
Clanton began his pro career in Poland, playing in the Polish league with Anwil Włocławek in 2013. He then played in South Korea, with the Korean Basketball League club Seoul Samsung Thunders. The same year, he also played in Puerto Rico for Leones de Ponce of the Puerto Rican League.

He next played in Israel, with the Israeli Second Division club Hapoel Be'er Sheva, before moving to Greece, where he joined the Greek League club PAOK, on March 14, 2016. On July 9, 2016, he renewed his contract with PAOK until 2017.

On August 2, 2017, Clanton joined PBC Lukoil Academic of the National Basketball League (Bulgaria). He averaged 8.2 points and 9 rebounds in Bulgaria. Clanton signed with Rethymno Cretan Kings of the Greek Basket League on September 4, 2018.

=== The Basketball Tournament ===
Clanton has played in The Basketball Tournament (TBT), an annual winner-take-all tournament, multiple times. In 2015, he played for Team Krossover, in 2017 for Pedro's Posse, in 2018 and 2019 for Team DRC, and in 2021 for Florida TNT. With Florida TNT, he was his team's high-scorer and top rebounder in their semifinal loss to Boeheim's Army.
