= UCF Knights men's basketball =

Basketball team which represents the University of Central Florida

2026–27 UCF Knights men's basketball team
- University: University of Central Florida
- First season: 1969–70; 57 years ago
- Athletic director: Terry Mohajir
- Head coach: Johnny Dawkins; 11th season, 189–124 (.604)
- Location: Orlando, Florida
- Arena: Addition Financial Arena (capacity: 9,432)
- NCAA division: Division I
- Conference: Big 12
- Nickname: Knights
- Colors: Black and gold
- Student section: Knightmare
- All-time record: 885–722 (.551)
- NCAA tournament record: 1–6 (.143)

NCAA Division I tournament round of 32
- 2019

NCAA Division I tournament appearances
- 1994, 1996, 2004, 2005, 2019, 2026

NCAA Division II tournament Final Four
- 1978
Other NCAA Division II tournament results
Elite Eight	1978
Sweet Sixteen	1977, 1978, 1980, 1981
Appearances	1976, 1977, 1978, 1980, 1981, 1982

Conference tournament champions
- SSC: 1978 ASUN: 1994, 1996, 2004, 2005

Conference regular-season champions
- SSC: 1976, 1977, 1978, 1981, 1982, 1984 ASUN: 2005

Uniforms
Home	Away	Alternate

The UCF Knights men's basketball team (UCF) represents the University of Central Florida, located in unincorporated Orange County near Orlando, in the U.S. state of Florida. UCF competes in Division I of the National Collegiate Athletic Association (NCAA), and the Big 12 Conference. The Knights play their home games in the Addition Financial Arena on the university's main campus. They are coached by Johnny Dawkins, who was hired in 2016.

The Knights have appeared in the NCAA Division II Tournament six times (1976, 1977, 1978, 1980, 1981, 1982), including the Final Four in 1978. UCF has reached the NCAA Division I Tournament six times (1994, 1996, 2004, 2005, 2019, and 2026). UCF has won seven regular season conference championships and five conference tournament championships.

== History ==
UCF played its first intercollegiate basketball game before the team even had a nickname. In the Division II era, under Torchy Clark, UCF found great success including a DII Final Four appearance. UCF has competed in the Atlantic Sun Conference (formerly called the Trans American Athletic Conference), from 1992 until 2005, when all sports joined Conference USA. Prior to 2013–14 all UCF sports joined the American Athletic Conference for its inaugural season. As a Division II team, the Knights had been a charter member of the Sunshine State Conference from 1975 to 1984. The Knights also had a brief one-year stint in the Sun Belt Conference.

=== Head coaches ===
UCF has had seven head coaches since organized basketball began in 1969. The Knights have played nearly 1,200 games in their 44 seasons. In that time, four coaches have led the Knights to the postseason: Torchy Clark, Kirk Speraw, Donnie Jones, and Johnny Dawkins. Clark in 1976, 1977, 1978, 1980, 1981, and 1982, Speraw in 1994, 1996, 2004, and 2005, and Jones in 2011 and 2012. Clark is the only coach to take the Knights past the first round of the NCAA tournament, reaching the 1978 Final Four following a 24–game winning streak. Speraw is the longest tenured coach in program history, at 17 seasons. Clark remains the winningest coach in school history, with 274 wins in 14 seasons. Donnie Jones, who was hired in 2010, was fired by UCF on March 10, 2016. Johnny Dawkins, who was fired by Stanford, was hired on March 22, 2016. In Dawkins' first season, he led the Knights to the NIT semifinals at Madison Square Garden. In 2018–19, Dawkins' UCF team earned the program's first at-large bid to the NCAA tournament, and then won the program's first NCAA Tournament game, defeating VCU in the first round.

Tenure	Coach	Years	Record	Pct.
1969–1983	Torchy Clark	14	274–89	.755
1983–1985	Chuck Machock	2	25–31	.446
1985–1989	Phil Carter	4	34–76	.309
1989–1993	Joe Dean Jr.	4	37–73	.336
1993–2010	Kirk Speraw	17	247–233	.515
2010–2016	Donnie Jones	6	79–88	.473
2016–present	Johnny Dawkins	10	180–121	.598
57 seasons			876–711	.552

=== Clark era ===
Eugene "Torchy" Clark served as FTU's, then UCF's, first head basketball coach. In 1969, Clark, who was a Wisconsin high school coach, was responsible for starting the university's basketball program from scratch. The creation of the program had only been approved by the Florida Board of Regents five months prior to his hire. That year, as a club level team, the Knights went 11–3, including a 99–38 victory in their first game over Massey Tech. The first season would serve as an omen for UCF basketball, with Clark bringing the university unprecedented success as a Division II team. Roaming the sidelines for 14 seasons, Clark never had a losing season, and built UCF into a national power, bringing the Knights five Sunshine State Conference regular season championships, one conference tournament championship, and six NCAA tournament appearances in eight years. In 1978, Clark led the Knights, who at the time were riding a 24–game winning streak, to the Final Four in Minnesota. During his tenure, the Knights were ranked in the top 10 nationally for seven consecutive years.

Clark earned Sunshine State Coach of the Year honors four times, and won the conference's coach of the decade award. While at UCF, he coached both of his sons, Bo and Mike. All three men are members of the UCF Athletic Hall of Fame, and Torchy Clark is a member of the Sunshine State Conference Hall of Fame. Bo is the Knight's all-time leading scorer, with Mike second on the list, and as a freshman in 1976, Bo was the nation's leading scorer. The father-son duo were featured in a 1979 Sports Illustrated issue.

On February 26, 1983, Clark coached his last game as a Knight, with UCF falling to Florida Southern. During his tenure, Clark's squads went 274–89 (.754), winning 20 or more games in a year on seven occasions. He enjoyed a 71–13 (.845) record in the Sunshine State Conference. In the decade after he retired, the Knights had only one winning season, the year after he left.

=== Lost decade: Machock, Carter and Dean ===
Replacing the legendary Torchy Clark would prove impossible for his successors. The three men who replaced him went a combined 96–180 (.347) in 10 seasons, including only one season with a winning record. Hired to be Clark's replacement, Chuck Machock, an assistant coach at Ohio State, took the helm for the 1983–84 season. That year, he led the Knights to a 15–13 record, earning the team's sixth Sunshine State Conference regular season championship in their final year in the conference. The next year, UCF ascended to the ranks of Division I, earning a 10–18 record under Machock in what would be the Knights' first losing season, and Machock's final season with the team. In two seasons, he led the Knights to a 25–31 (.446) record.

Following their first losing season, the Knights hired Phil Carter. He would coach the Knights for four years, earning a 34–76 (.309) record. In his first year, the Knights suffered a disappointing 6–22 record. The next year, Carter engineered one of the top improvements in the nation, leading UCF to a 12–15 campaign. From there, the club faltered under his lead, earning nine and seven win seasons respectively. Carter finished his tenure without a winning season, manufacturing a 34–76 (.309) record.

Coming from Birmingham-Southern, coach Joe Dean replaced Carter. He led the Knights through a tumultuous four-year period, with two conference affiliation changes. In his second year with the team, UCF joined the American South Conference, the team's first affiliation since joining Division I. The next year, the conference became the Sun Belt Conference, and the year after that, the Knights joined the Atlantic Sun Conference. In 1991, the Knights moved from their original home-court, which was in the education building, to their new court inside what is now known as "The Venue". In their last game in the education gymnasium, the team lost to Louisiana-Lafayette 85–94 on February 23, 1991. On November 30, 1991, the Knights posted an 82–74 victory over Campbell in their first game in the new arena. In his four seasons with the Knights, Dean earned a 37–73 (.336) record. Like his predecessor, he did not have a single winning season.

=== Speraw era ===
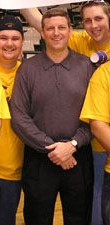
Former Head Coach Kirk Speraw with fans

Following the departure of Dean, on July 28, 1993, Kirk Speraw, an assistant coach at Florida, was hired as the Knights' new head coach. During his 17-year tenure, he led the Knights to four Atlantic Sun Conference tournament champions, one regular season championship, and their first four NCAA tournament appearances (94, 96, 04, 05).

When Speraw took the helm in 1993, UCF had had only one winning season since Torchy Clark left a decade earlier. In his first year, Speraw led the Knights to an 11-game turnaround (21–9), earning them their first Division I NCAA Tournament appearance. After a down 1994–1995 season, Speraw once again led the Knights to an NCAA Tournament appearance in 1996, despite their 8–18 regular season record (tied for the worst regular season record of any NCAA Division I Tournament team ever), after winning the TAAC Tournament as massive underdogs, their second NCAA Tournament appearance in his first three years. In the team's last two years in the Atlantic Sun Conference, the Knights won both the 2004 and 2005 conference tournaments, and were the 2005 regular season champions as well. Despite their success, the Knights have never progressed past the first round of the NCAA tournament as a Division I team. UCF made its debut in Conference USA in 2005, and the team earned a berth in the Conference USA Championship Tournament in their first year. The Knights fell to Houston in the second round and closed out the season with the program's first losing record (14–15) since 2000–2001. The Knights made a huge turnaround in the 2006–07 season, finishing second in conference play to Memphis with an overall record of 22–9. Speraw won 2007 Conference USA Coach of the Year honors.

The Knights played their first game in the new UCF Arena on November 3, 2007, an 86–78 win over the Saint Leo Lions. In their first regular-season game in the new arena, the Knights won 63–60 over the Nevada Wolf Pack, on November 11, 2007. In thrilling fashion, the Knights defeated the Tulsa Golden Hurricane in triple overtime 97–91 in front of an announced crowd of 7,097, in their first home C-USA game in the arena on January 11, 2008. In what would be Speraw's final season with the team, on February 2, 2010, the Knights defeated the East Carolina Pirates 67–56, earning him his 275th win at UCF, passing Torchy Clark as the winningest coach in program history.

Following a disappointing 2009–10 season in which the Knights went 15–17, the university decided not to retain Speraw, bringing an end to his 17-year tenure. He garnered a school-high 279 wins (on 233 losses–.544), including 118–90 (.567) in the Atlantic Sun and 40–38 (.512) in Conference USA.

=== Jones era ===
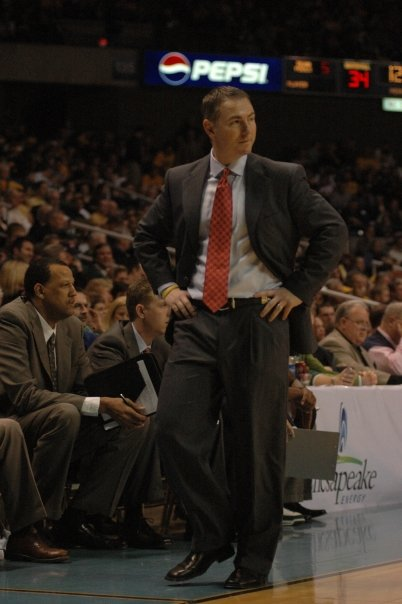
Donnie Jones

On March 30, 2010, UCF announced Donnie Jones as the university's new men's basketball head coach. On December 1, 2010, the Knights upset the #16 Florida Gators 57–54, giving them their first victory over a top 20 opponent as well as their first victory over the Gators. Following a 10–0 start to the 2010–11 season, the Knights were nationally ranked for the first time in program history at the Division I level. At the time, UCF was one of nine unbeaten teams, and one of only four schools to be ranked in the BCS standings and the AP basketball poll. The Knights started the season 14–0, their best start since moving to Division I, ranking as high as #18, and opened conference play with a defeat of Jones' former team, the Marshall Thundering Herd. UCF finished the season 21–12 (6–10), with an appearance in the College Basketball Invitational.

Jones led the Knights to the biggest win in program history, when on November 25, 2011 they defeated the defending national champions and then-ranked #4 Connecticut Huskies 68–63 in the inaugural Battle 4 Atlantis tournament. Jones led the Knights to a 22–11 record in 2012, including the program's first ever NIT berth.

==== Recruiting scandal ====
Following an investigation into recruiting violations in the men's basketball program in 2011, on July 31, 2012, the NCAA announced sanctions – in addition to penalties UCF self-imposed. The NCAA imposed a one-year postseason ban on the program. The penalty was in addition to a $50,000 fine, adding two years to UCF's previously proposed three years' probation, reduction of basketball scholarships, and the vacating of 53 basketball victories for three seasons in which there was an ineligible player. Despite the sanctions, Jones led the Knights to their third consecutive twenty-win season in 2013 with a 20–11 record. Jones was fired on March 10, 2016, leaving with a 100–88 record at UCF.

=== Dawkins era ===
Former Stanford coach Johnny Dawkins replaced Jones as head coach on March 22, 2016.

The Knights made it back to the NCAA tournament for the first time since 2005 during the 2018–2019 season after going 24–8, which included an upset win over #9 Houston breaking their 33-game home winning streak. UCF won its first NCAA Tournament game on March 22, 2019 by beating VCU in the first round.

== Postseason results ==
=== NCAA Division I tournament results ===
The Knights have appeared in the NCAA Division I men's basketball tournament six times. Their combined record is 1–6.

Year	Seed	Round	Opponent	Result
1994	#16	First round	#1 Purdue	L 67–98
1996	#16	First round	#1 Massachusetts	L 70–92
2004	#14	First round	#3 Pittsburgh	L 44–53
2005	#15	First round	#2 Connecticut	L 71–77
2019	#9	First round Second round	#8 VCU #1 Duke	W 73–58; L 76–77
2026	#10	First round	#7 UCLA	L 71–75

=== NCAA Division II tournament results ===
The Knights appeared in the NCAA Division II Tournament six times. Their combined record was 6–9.

Year	Round	Opponent	Result
1976	Regional semifinals Regional 3rd-place game	Valdosta State; Rollins	L 82–95; L 91–101
1977	Regional semifinals Regional finals	Armstrong Atlantic State; UT Chattanooga	W 91–81; L 79–88
1978	Regional semifinals Regional finals Elite Eight; Final Four; National 3rd-place game	Augusta State; Florida A&M; San Diego; Cheyney; Eastern Illinois	W 86–66; W 85–78; W 77–71; L 63–79; L 67–77
1980	Regional semifinals Regional finals	West Georgia; Florida Southern	W 81–78; L 64–71
1981	Regional semifinals Regional finals	Morehouse; Florida Southern	W 94–77; L 71–73
1982	Regional semifinals Regional 3rd-place game	Southeast Missouri State; Central Missouri State	L 55–60; L 62–70

=== NIT results ===
The Knights have made four appearances in the National Invitation Tournament (NIT). Their combined record is 4–4.

Year	Round	Opponent	Result
2012	First round	Drexel	L 56–81
2017	First round Second round Quarterfinals; Semifinals	Colorado; Illinois State; Illinois; TCU	W 79–74; W 63–62; W 68–58; L 53–68
2023	First round Second round	Florida; Oregon	W 67–49; L 54–68
2024	First round	South Florida	L 77–83

=== CBI results ===
The Knights have appeared in one College Basketball Invitational (CBI). Their record is 2–1.

Year	Round	Opponent	Result
2011	First round Quarterfinals; Semifinals	St. Bonaventure; Rhode Island; Creighton	W 69–54; W 66–54; L 64–82

=== CBC results ===
The Knights have appeared in the College Basketball Crown once. Their overall record is 3–1.

Year	Round	Opponent	Result
2025	First round Quarterfinals; Semifinals; Championship	Oregon State; Cincinnati; Villanova; Nebraska	W 76–75; W 88–80; W 104–98^{OT} L 66–77

== Home courts ==
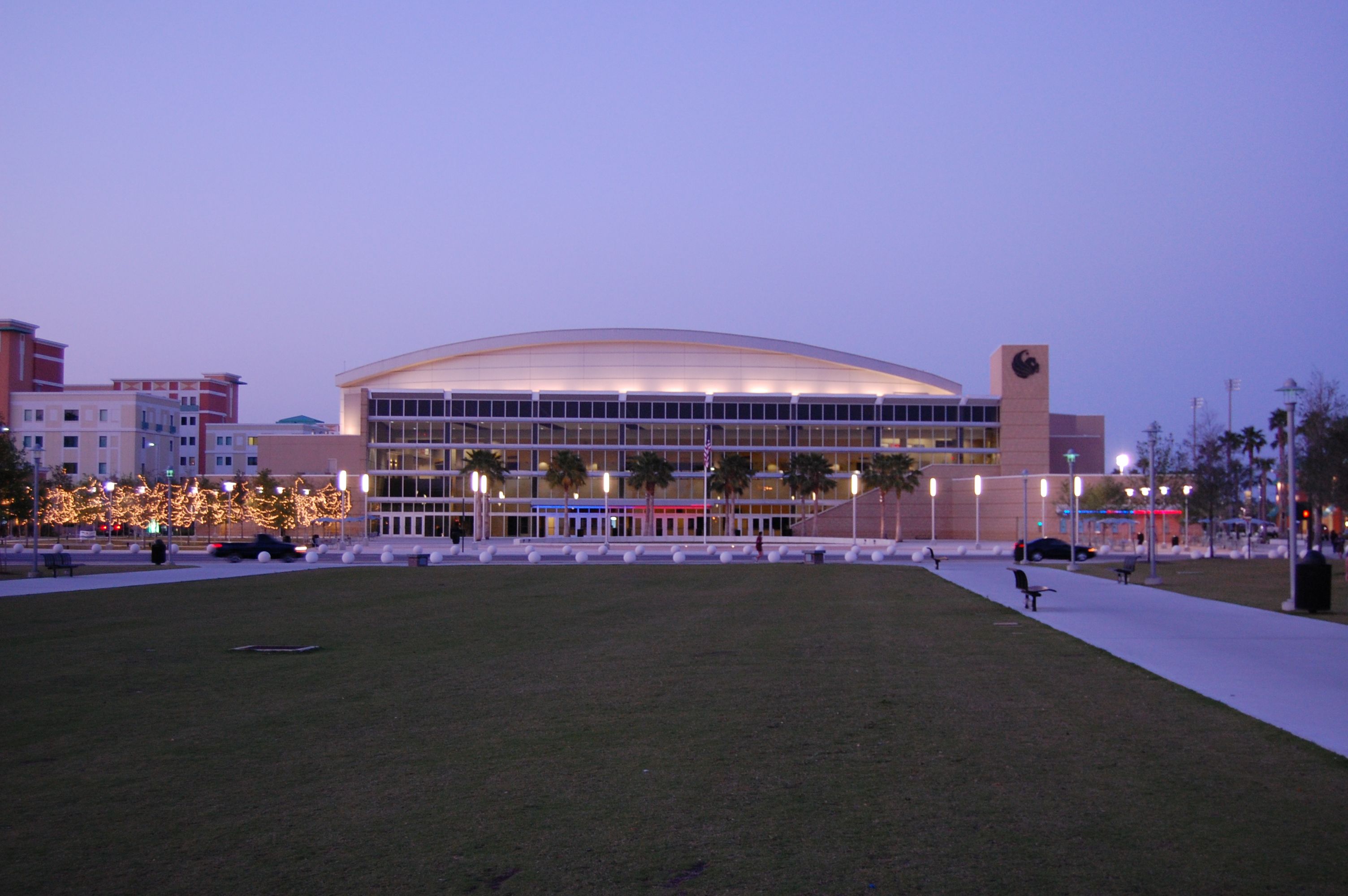
Addition Financial Arena

The Knights have taken the hardwood in three venues, all of which are still standing on UCF's main campus.

UCF Knights men's basketball historical venues
Education Gymnasium	1969–1991
The Venue at UCF	1991–2007
Addition Financial Arena	2007–present

The Knight's first permanent home was in the College of Education's gymnasium. Seating under 1,000, this court served the team for over 20 years. The UCF Arena, now known as the Venue, broke ground in 1990 and opened for play in 1991. The Knights played their final season in the venue in 2007, going 15–1 at home, only losing to the Elite Eight-bound Memphis Tigers. The final game saw UCF defeating East Carolina 77–64 in front of 3,725 people. UCF averaged a then-school record 2,706 average attendance during the season.

UCF moved into its new home for the 2007–08 season, the 10,000 seat Addition Financial Arena (then known as CFE Arena). The Knights opened up their new arena against the reigning Western Athletic Conference champion Nevada Wolf Pack on November 11, 2007 in front of a crowd of 4,668. The attendance record in the new Arena is 10,011, which was against the Illinois Fighting Illini in the quarterfinals of the 2017 National Invitation Tournament.

== Traditions ==
=== Knightmare ===
Interior of Addition Financial Arena

When the basketball program moved into what is now Addition Financial Arena in the fall of 2007, the facility could hold more students than ever before. To go along with its new facility and its new commitment to basketball, a new student section was formed. The "Knightmare" debuted on January 11, 2008. Adorned in their black Knightmare shirts, the students completely filled the bleachered section behind the basket and the overflow section in the upper deck. In what will go down as one of the greatest basketball games in UCF basketball history, the Knights defeated Tulsa 97–91 in triple overtime in front of a then-record crowd of 7,097 fans.

One of UCF's most unusual basketball traditions is its free throw chant. Started by the "Kirk's Jerks" in the 1990s, UCF fans started holding their right arms with clenched fists almost straight up when a UCF player shoots a free throw. When the basketball is made, the fans would stomp their right foot twice, clap their hands twice, make a shooting motion with their right hand while chanting "woosh." In the more recent years, after the appropriately named "Stomp Stomp, Clap Clap, Woosh" chant, fans chant U-C-F afterwards, making the shape of a U, a C, and an F over their heads. During the 2010–11 season, a group of students attempted to start a new tradition; if a UCF player makes all of his free throws, the chant is followed by "ballin'."

== Notable alumni ==
=== Retired numbers ===
UCF Knights retired numbers
No.	Player	Pos.	Tenure	No. ret.	Ref.
23	Bo Clark	SG	1975–1980	1980	

=== NBA ===
- Joey Graham (Toronto Raptors, Denver Nuggets, and Cleveland Cavaliers)
- Stephen Graham (Houston Rockets, Chicago Bulls, Cleveland Cavaliers, Portland Trail Blazers, Indiana Pacers, Charlotte Hornets, and Brooklyn Nets)
- Mark Jones (Orlando Magic)
- Stan Kimbrough (Detroit Pistons and Sacramento Kings)
- Jermaine Taylor (Houston Rockets and Sacramento Kings)
- Matt Williams (Miami Heat)
- Tacko Fall (Boston Celtics and Cleveland Cavaliers)
- Brandon Goodwin (Denver Nuggets, Atlanta Hawks, and Cleveland Cavaliers)
- Taylor Hendricks (Memphis Grizzlies)

=== NBA draft selections ===
There have been four former UCF players selected in the NBA draft:

- Bennie Shaw (1976, 9th round 146th overall by the Milwaukee Bucks)
- Joey Graham (2005, 1st round 16th overall by the Toronto Raptors)
- Jermaine Taylor (2009, 2nd round 32nd overall by the Washington Wizards)
- Taylor Hendricks (2023, 1st round 9th overall by the Utah Jazz)

=== Knights overseas ===
- Nick Banyard
- Chad Brown
- Ray Carter
- Keith Clanton
- A.J. Davis
- Shaheed Davis
- Aubrey Dawkins
- Jordan Ivy-Curry
- Matt Milon
- Josh Peppers
- Darius Perry
- Isaac Sosa
- Isaiah Sykes
- C.J. Walker
- Kenrick Zondervan

== See also ==
- UCF Knights women's basketball
