= 2024–25 Texas Tech Red Raiders basketball team =

American college basketball season

2024–25 Texas Tech Red Raiders basketball

NCAA tournament, Elite Eight
- Conference: Big 12 Conference

Ranking
- Coaches: No. 8
- AP: No. 8
- Record: 28–9 (15–5 Big 12)
- Head coach: Grant McCasland (2nd season)
- Assistant coaches: Matt Braeuer (2nd season); Achoki Moikobu (2nd season); Luke Barnwell (2nd season); Jeff Linder (1st season)
- Home arena: United Supermarkets Arena

2024–25 Big 12 men's basketball standings
	Conf.				Overall
Team	W		L	PCT	W		L	PCT
No. 2 Houston †	19	–	1	.950	35	–	5	.875
No. 8 Texas Tech	15	–	5	.750	28	–	9	.757
No. 15 Arizona	14	–	6	.700	24	–	13	.649
No. 13 BYU	14	–	6	.700	26	–	10	.722
No. 17 Iowa State	13	–	7	.650	25	–	10	.714
Kansas	11	–	9	.550	21	–	13	.618
Baylor	10	–	10	.500	20	–	15	.571
West Virginia	10	–	10	.500	19	–	13	.594
TCU	9	–	11	.450	16	–	16	.500
Kansas State	9	–	11	.450	16	–	17	.485
Utah	8	–	12	.400	16	–	17	.485
Oklahoma State	7	–	13	.350	17	–	18	.486
Cincinnati	7	–	13	.350	19	–	16	.543
UCF	7	–	13	.350	20	–	17	.541
Arizona State	4	–	16	.200	13	–	20	.394
Colorado	3	–	17	.150	14	–	21	.400
† 2025 Big 12 tournament winner Rankings from AP poll

The 2024–25 Texas Tech Red Raiders basketball team represented Texas Tech University during the 2024–25 NCAA Division I men's basketball season as a member of the Big 12 Conference. The Red Raiders were led by second-year coach Grant McCasland, and played their home games at the United Supermarkets Arena located in Lubbock, Texas.

Texas Tech entered as the No. 2 seed of the Big 12 tournament, held at T-Mobile Center in Kansas City, Missouri, finishing the regular season with a strong conference record. In the quarterfinals, they narrowly defeated No. 7 seed Baylor, 76–74, thanks to a dominant performance by JT Toppin. However, their run ended in the semifinals, where they fell to No. 3 seed Arizona, 86–80.

Texas Tech earned an at-large bid to the NCAA tournament as the No. 3 seed in the West Region. In the first round, they defeated No. 14 seed UNC Wilmington, 82–72. They followed that with a solid 77–64 victory over No. 11 seed Drake in the second round. In the Sweet Sixteen, the Red Raiders edged No. 10 seed Arkansas, 85–83 in overtime, advancing to the Elite Eight for the third time in program history.

In the Elite Eight, Texas Tech faced No. 1 seed Florida. Despite a strong effort, the Red Raiders were eliminated with an 84–79 loss to the eventual national champions, ending their season.

== Previous season ==
The Red Raiders finished the 2023–24 season 23–11, 11–7 in Big 12 play to finish in a tie for third place. As the No. 4 seed in the Big 12 tournament, they defeated BYU in the quarterfinals, before losing to Houston in the semifinals. The Red Raiders received an at-large bid to the NCAA tournament as the No. 6 seed in the South Region, where they were defeated by NC State in the first round.

== Preseason ==
Big 12 Preseason Poll

	Big 12 Coaches	Points
1.	Kansas	215 (9)
2.	Houston	211 (5)
3.	Iowa State	194 (1)
4.	Baylor	185
5.	Arizona	179 (1)
6.	Cincinnati	140
7.	Texas Tech	135
8.	Kansas State	133
9.	BYU	116
10.	TCU	90
11.	UCF	83
12.	Arizona State	64
13.	West Virginia	62
14.	Oklahoma State	46
15.	Colorado	37
16.	Utah	30
Reference: (#) first-place votes

Pre-Season All-Big 12 Team

First Team

Player	School
Caleb Love	Arizona
LJ Cryer	Houston
J’Wan Roberts	Houston
Tamin Lipsey	Iowa State
Hunter Dickinson†	Kansas
† denotes unanimous selection Reference:

Second Team

Player	School
Norchad Omier	Baylor
Jeremy Roach	Baylor
Keshon Gilbert	Iowa State
Dajuan Harris Jr	Kansas
Coleman Hawkins	Kansas State
† denotes unanimous selection Reference:

- Player of the Year: Hunter Dickinson, Kansas
- Co-Newcomer of the Year: Jeremy Roach, Baylor & Coleman Hawkins, Kansas State
- Freshman of the Year: V. J. Edgecombe, Baylor

== Roster ==
2024–25 Texas Tech Red Raiders men's basketball team
Players
Coaches

Pos.	#	Name	Height	Weight	Year	Previous school	Hometown
G	0	Chance McMillian	6 ft 3 in (1.91 m)	190 lb (86 kg)	GS	Grand Canyon	Vallejo, CA
G	1	Kevin Overton	6 ft 5 in (1.96 m)	200 lb (91 kg)	So	Drake	Oklahoma City, OK
G	2	Jazz Henderson	5 ft 11 in (1.8 m)	175 lb (79 kg)	Fr	Oak Cliff Faith Academy	Dallas, TX
G	3	Elijah Hawkins	5 ft 11 in (1.8 m)	160 lb (73 kg)	Sr	Minnesota	Washington, D.C.
G	4	Christian Anderson	6 ft 2 in (1.88 m)	165 lb (75 kg)	Fr	Oak Hill Academy	Atlanta, GA
F	5	Darrion Williams	6 ft 6 in (1.98 m)	225 lb (102 kg)	Jr	Nevada	Sacramento, CA
G	6	Leon Horner	6 ft 4 in (1.93 m)	215 lb (98 kg)	Fr	Dynamic Prep	Dallas, TX
G	10	Jack Francis	6 ft 3 in (1.91 m)	185 lb (84 kg)	Jr	Anderson HS	Austin, TX
F	15	JT Toppin	6 ft 9 in (2.06 m)	225 lb (102 kg)	So	New Mexico	Dallas, TX
F	22	Corbin Green	6 ft 5 in (1.96 m)	230 lb (104 kg)	Jr	Air Force	Midlothian, TX
F	23	Eemeli Yalaho	6 ft 8 in (2.03 m)	240 lb (109 kg)	So	Western Reserve Academy	Jyväskylä, Finland
G	24	Kerwin Walton	6 ft 5 in (1.96 m)	210 lb (95 kg)	GS	North Carolina	Hopkins, MN
F	33	Federiko Federiko	6 ft 11 in (2.11 m)	215 lb (98 kg)	Sr	Pitt	Helsinki, Finland
G	35	Devan Cambridge	6 ft 6 in (1.98 m)	210 lb (95 kg)	GS	Arizona State	Nashville, TN

Head coach

- Grant McCasland (Baylor)

Assistant coach(es)

- Matt Braeuer (Wichita State)
- Achoki Moikobu (Fort Hays State)
- Luke Barnwell (Newman)
- Jeff Linder (Western State)

Legend

- (C) Team captain
- (S) Suspended
- (I) Ineligible
- (W) Walk-on
- Injured
- Current redshirt

Roster
Last update: October 17, 2024

== Schedule and results ==
Date time, TV	Rank^{#}	Opponent^{#}	Result	Record	High points	High rebounds	High assists	Site (attendance) city, state
Non-conference regular season
November 5, 2024*; 7:00 p.m., ESPN+		Bethune–Cookman	W 94–61	1–0	21 – Walton	8 – Toppin	6 – Williams	United Supermarkets Arena (12,034); Lubbock, TX
November 8, 2024*; 8:00 p.m., ESPN+		Northwestern State	W 86–65	2–0	25 – Toppin	8 – tied	11 – Williams	United Supermarkets Arena (13,610); Lubbock, TX
November 13, 2024*; 7:00 p.m., ESPN+		Wyoming	W 96–49	3–0	24 – Toppin	12 – Toppin	5 – Hawkins	United Supermarkets Arena (11,456); Lubbock, TX
November 18, 2024*; 7:00 p.m., ESPN+		Arkansas–Pine Bluff	W 98–64	4–0	19 – Williams	11 – Toppin	11 – Hawkins	United Supermarkets Arena (9,847); Lubbock, TX
November 21, 2024*; 8:00 p.m., ESPN2		vs. Saint Joseph's; Legends Classic semifinals	L 77–78	4–1	22 – Toppin	18 – Toppin	4 – Anderson	Barclays Center (6,941); Brooklyn, NY
November 22, 2024*; 6:00 p.m., ESPNU		vs. Syracuse; Legends Classic 3rd place game	W 79–74	5–1	20 – Williams	6 – tied	6 – Hawkins	Barclays Center (6,572); Brooklyn, NY
November 29, 2024*; 7:00 p.m., ESPN+		Northern Colorado	W 89–64	6–1	21 – Williams	15 – Toppin	3 – tied	United Supermarkets Arena (13,274); Lubbock, TX
December 4, 2024*; 8:00 p.m., ESPNU		DePaul; Big East–Big 12 Battle	W 76–62	7–1	22 – McMillian	6 – tied	5 – Hawkins	United Supermarkets Arena (11,465); Lubbock, TX
December 8, 2024*; 2:00 p.m., ESPN2		vs. No. 22 Texas A&M; Coast-to-Coast Challenge	L 67–72	7–2	23 – McMillian	6 – Federiko	5 – tied	Dickies Arena (12,642); Fort Worth, TX
December 16, 2024*; 7:00 p.m., ESPN+		Oral Roberts	W 86–50	8–2	23 – Federiko	12 – Federiko	9 – Williams	United Supermarkets Arena (9,967); Lubbock, TX
December 21, 2024*; 12:00 p.m., ESPN+		Lamar	W 101–57	9–2	23 – Williams	7 – Williams	7 – Hawkins	United Supermarkets Arena (10,013); Lubbock, TX
Big 12 regular season
December 31, 2024; 1:00 p.m., ESPN+		UCF	L 83–87	9–3 (0–1)	26 – Toppin	10 – Toppin	5 – Anderson	United Supermarkets Arena (12,767); Lubbock, TX
January 4, 2025; 6:00 p.m., ESPN+		at Utah	W 93–65	10–3 (1–1)	19 – Williams	6 – McMillian	9 – Williams	Jon M. Huntsman Center (7,798); Salt Lake City, UT
January 7, 2025; 8:00 p.m., ESPN+		at BYU	W 72–67	11–3 (2–1)	22 – Hawkins	8 – McMillian	5 – Hawkins	Marriott Center (17,307); Provo, UT
January 11, 2025; 1:00 p.m., ESPN		No. 3 Iowa State	L 84–85 ^{OT}	11–4 (2–2)	18 – tied	9 – Toppin	10 – Hawkins	United Supermarkets Arena (14,263); Lubbock, TX
January 14, 2025; 8:00 p.m., CBSSN		at Kansas State	W 61–57	12–4 (3–2)	16 – Williams	7 – Federiko	9 – Hawkins	Bramlage Coliseum (8,019); Manhattan, KS
January 18, 2025; 1:00 p.m., ESPN2		Arizona	W 70–54	13–4 (4–2)	20 – Toppin	16 – Toppin	9 – Hawkins	United Supermarkets Arena (15,098); Lubbock, TX
January 21, 2025; 6:00 p.m., ESPNU		at Cincinnati	W 81–71	14–4 (5–2)	20 – Toppin	7 – Toppin	3 – tied	Fifth Third Arena (10,790); Cincinnati, OH
January 26, 2025; 2:00 p.m., ESPN+		Oklahoma State	W 64–54	15–4 (6–2)	14 – McMillian	8 – Federiko	5 – Hawkins	United Supermarkets Arena (13,794); Lubbock, TX
January 29, 2025; 6:00 p.m., ESPN2	No. 22	TCU	W 71–57	16–4 (7–2)	18 – Toppin	14 – Toppin	5 – Hawkins	United Supermarkets Arena (14,114); Lubbock, TX
February 1, 2025; 5:00 p.m., ESPN2	No. 22	at No. 6 Houston	W 82–81 ^{OT}	17–4 (8–2)	23 – McMillian	6 – tied	4 – Hawkins	Fertitta Center (7,324); Houston, TX
February 4, 2025; 8:00 p.m., ESPN2	No. 13	Baylor	W 73–59	18–4 (9–2)	19 – McMillian	8 – tied	7 – Hawkins	United Supermarkets Arena (15,098); Lubbock, TX
February 8, 2025; 9:30 p.m., ESPN	No. 13	at No. 20 Arizona	L 73–82	18–5 (9–3)	21 – Toppin	13 – Toppin	12 – Hawkins	McKale Center (14,688); Tucson, AZ
February 12, 2025; 8:00 p.m., CBSSN	No. 12	Arizona State	W 111–106 ^{2OT}	19–5 (10–3)	41 – Toppin	15 – Toppin	7 – Hawkins	United Supermarkets Arena (13,290); Lubbock, TX
February 15, 2025; 2:00 p.m., ESPN+	No. 12	at Oklahoma State	W 93–55	20–5 (11–3)	32 – Toppin	12 – Toppin	6 – Hawkins	Gallagher-Iba Arena (7,702); Stillwater, OK
February 18, 2025; 7:00 p.m., ESPN+	No. 9	at TCU	L 66–69	20–6 (11–4)	21 – Williams	11 – Toppin	9 – Hawkins	Schollmaier Arena (6,339); Fort Worth, TX
February 22, 2025; 12:00 p.m., ESPN+	No. 9	West Virginia	W 73–51	21–6 (12–4)	22 – Toppin	8 – Toppin	5 – Hawkins	United Supermarkets Arena (14,466); Lubbock, TX
February 24, 2025; 8:00 p.m., ESPN	No. 10	No. 4 Houston	L 61–69	21–7 (12–5)	14 – tied	10 – Toppin	5 – Hawkins	United Supermarkets Arena (15,098); Lubbock, TX
March 1, 2025; 1:00 p.m., ESPN	No. 10	at Kansas	W 78–73	22–7 (13–5)	21 – Toppin	9 – Williams	6 – Anderson	Allen Fieldhouse (15,300); Lawrence, KS
March 5, 2025; 7:00 p.m., ESPN+	No. 9	Colorado	W 91–75	23–7 (14–5)	30 – Toppin	14 – Toppin	7 – Hawkins	United Supermarkets Arena (15,098); Lubbock, TX
March 8, 2025; 7:00 p.m., ESPNU	No. 9	at Arizona State	W 85–57	24–7 (15–5)	25 – Toppin	11 – Toppin	6 – McMillian	Desert Financial Arena (8,895); Phoenix, AZ
Big 12 tournament
March 13, 2025; 6:00 p.m., ESPN	(2) No. 9	vs. (7) Baylor; Quarterfinals	W 76–74	25–7	26 – Toppin	10 – Toppin	11 – Hawkins	T-Mobile Center (15,491); Kansas City, MO
March 14, 2025; 8:30 p.m., ESPN2	(2) No. 9	vs. (3) Arizona; Semifinals	L 80–86	25–8	20 – Overton	6 – tied	5 – Hawkins	T-Mobile Center (13,946); Kansas City, MO
NCAA tournament
March 20, 2025; 9:10 p.m., TruTV	(3 W) No. 9	vs. (14 W) UNC Wilmington; First Round	W 82–72	26–8	27 – Walton	11 – Toppin	10 – Hawkins	Intrust Bank Arena (14,474); Wichita, KS
March 22, 2025; 5:30 p.m., TNT	(3 W) No. 9	vs. (11 W) Drake; Second Round	W 77–64	27–8	28 – Williams	12 – Toppin	7 – Hawkins	Intrust Bank Arena (14,168); Wichita, KS
March 27, 2025; 9:09 p.m., TBS	(3 W) No. 9	vs. (10 W) Arkansas; Sweet Sixteen	W 85–83 ^{OT}	28–8	22 – Anderson	9 – tied	5 – Hawkins	Chase Center (16,417); San Francisco, CA
March 29, 2025; 5:09 p.m., TruTV/TBS	(3 W) No. 9	vs. (1 W) No. 3 Florida; Elite Eight	L 79–84	28–9	23 – Williams	11 – Toppin	7 – Hawkins	Chase Center (16,778); San Francisco, CA
*Non-conference game. ^{#}Rankings from AP poll. (#) Tournament seedings in parentheses. W=West. All times are in Central Time.

== Rankings ==
Ranking movements Legend: ██ Increase in ranking ██ Decrease in ranking — = Not ranked RV = Received votes
	Week																				
Poll	Pre	1	2	3	4	5	6	7	8	9	10	11	12	13	14	15	16	17	18	19	Final
AP	RV	RV	RV	RV	RV	—	—	RV	RV	RV	RV	RV	22	13	12	9	10	9	9	9	8
Coaches	RV	RV	22	RV	RV	RV	RV	RV	RV	RV	RV	25	19	12	12	10	10	9	9	9	8
