= 2025 College Basketball Crown =

College basketball tournament

- Season: 2024–25
- Teams: 16
- Finals site: T-Mobile Arena, Paradise, Nevada
- Champions: Nebraska (1st title)
- Runner-up: UCF (1st title game)
- Semifinalists: Boise State (1st semifinal); Villanova (1st semifinal)
- Winning coach: Fred Hoiberg (1st title)
- MVP: Juwan Gary (Nebraska)
- Attendance: 20,045 (tournament); 3,314 (final)
- Top scorer: Brice Williams (Nebraska) (93 points)

The 2025 College Basketball Crown (CBC) was a single-elimination, fully-bracketed men's college basketball postseason tournament featuring sixteen National Collegiate Athletic Association (NCAA) Division I teams not selected to participate in the NCAA Division I men's basketball tournament. It commenced on March 31 and concluded on April 6. All games were played on the Las Vegas Strip in Paradise, Nevada, with all first-round and quarterfinal games at the MGM Grand Garden Arena and the semifinal and final games at T-Mobile Arena. The first-round and quarterfinal games aired on FS1 and the semifinal and final games on Fox.

The bracket was unveiled on March 17, 2025, during the FS1 show Breakfast Ball by Fox Sports college basketball broadcaster, writer, and insider John Fanta. The tournament featured a Name, Image, And Likeness (NIL) prize pool that paid $300,000 for the championship team, $100,000 to the runner-up team, and $50,000 to each of the other two teams that reach the semifinals but failed to advance.

The University of Nebraska Cornhuskers defeated the University of Central Florida Knights 77–66 to claim the championship. The All-Tournament Team was composed of Tyson Degenhart (Boise State), Eric Dixon (Villanova), Juwan Gary (Nebraska), Darius Johnson (UCF) and Brice Williams (Nebraska); Gary was also selected Most Valuable Player.

== Participating teams ==
Note: Team records are as of the beginning of the tournament.

Team	Conference	Overall record	NET rank	Bid type
Arizona State	Big 12	13–19 (.406)	74	At-large
Boise State	Mountain West	24–10 (.706)	44	At-large
Butler	Big East	14–19 (.424)	83	Automatic
Cincinnati	Big 12	18–15 (.545)	50	Automatic
Colorado	Big 12	14–20 (.412)	86	At-large
DePaul	Big East	14–19 (.424)	119	At-large
George Washington	Atlantic 10	21–12 (.636)	124	At-large
Georgetown	Big East	17–15 (.531)	88	At-large
Nebraska	Big Ten	17–14 (.548)	59	Automatic
Oregon State	West Coast	20–12 (.625)	85	At-large
Tulane	American Athletic	19–13 (.594)	145	At-large
UCF	Big 12	17–16 (.515)	71	Automatic
USC	Big Ten	16–17 (.485)	70	Automatic
Utah	Big 12	16–16 (.500)	73	At-large
Villanova	Big East	19–14 (.576)	55	Automatic
Washington State	West Coast	19–14 (.576)	112	At-large

=== Rejected bids ===
- Indiana
- Iowa
- Kansas State
- Northwestern
- Ohio State
- Penn State
- Rutgers
- TCU
- West Virginia

== Field synopsis ==
Rankings, ratings and records were through March 16, 2025 Selection Sunday and prior to any additional post-season activity. This also includes a "KNIT" score, which is leveraged as a criteria and evaluation tool for the National Invitation Tournament selection committee; it average of the following seven metrics, then ranks based on the results:

- BTR: Bart Torvik "T-Rank" Ranking
- BPI: ESPN Basketball Power Index
- KPR: Ken Pomeroy College Basketball Ratings (aka "KenPom")
- KPI: Kevin Pauga Index
- NET: NCAA Evaluation Tool
- SOR: Strength Of Record, as calculated by ESPN
- WAB: Wins Above Bubble, as calculated by Bart Torvik

The operators of the CBC have not publicly disclosed the criteria used to select participating teams. It is unknown whether one, some, all or none of the metrics mentioned above were considered in deciding which teams to invite. While each of the Big 12, Big East and Big Ten conferences committed to send two teams to the tournament, how these teams were chosen is unknown.

Bid	KNIT	School	Conference	Conference Place	Conference W–L	Division I W–L	Overall W–L	BTR	BPI	KPR	KPI	NET	SOR	WAB	Road W–L	Neutral W–L	Home W–L	Quad 1 W–L	Quad 2 W–L	Quad 3 W–L	Quad 4 W–L	Non D-I W–L
At-Large	51	Boise State	Mountain West	T–4th	14–6 (.700)	23–10 (.697)	24–10 (.706)	50	48	50	50	44	55	53	6–5 (.545)	5–3 (.625)	13–2 (.867)	3–6 (.333)	5–2 (.714)	5–1 (.833)	10–1 (.909)	1–0 (1.000)
Automatic	54	Cincinnati	Big 12	T–12th	7–13 (.350)	18–15 (.545)	18–15 (.545)	44	40	55	66	50	59	61	4–9 (.308)	2–1 (.667)	12–5 (.706)	3–12 (.200)	7–3 (.700)	2–0 (1.000)	6–0 (1.000)	0–0 (–)
Automatic	55	Nebraska	Big Ten	T–12th	7–13 (.350)	17–14 (.548)	17–14 (.548)	62	55	54	55	59	60	57	5–7 (.417)	2–1 (.667)	10–6 (.625)	5–10 (.333)	4–2 (.667)	2–2 (.500)	6–0 (1.000)	0–0 (–)
Automatic	59	Villanova	Big East	6th	11–9 (.550)	19–14 (.576)	19–14 (.576)	52	41	56	95	55	61	71	3–8 (.273)	2–3 (.400)	14–3 (.824)	2–7 (.222)	5–4 (.556)	5–2 (.714)	7–1 (.875)	0–0 (–)
Automatic	67	UCF	Big 12	T–12th	7–13 (.350)	17–16 (.515)	17–16 (.515)	69	64	68	75	71	65	67	2–8 (.200)	2–3 (.400)	13–5 (.722)	3–11 (.214)	3–5 (.375)	6–0 (1.000)	5–0 (1.000)	0–0 (–)
Automatic	69	USC	Big Ten	T–12th	7–13 (.350)	16–17 (.485)	16–17 (.485)	59	60	63	69	70	83	81	3–7 (.300)	1–3 (.250)	12–7 (.632)	3–13 (.188)	4–2 (.667)	3–2 (.600)	6–0 (1.000)	0–0 (–)
At-Large	75	Utah	Big 12	11th	8–12 (.400)	16–16 (.500)	16–16 (.500)	67	61	76	96	73	75	76	1–9 (.100)	0–3 (.000)	15–4 (.789)	2–12 (.143)	4–4 (.500)	2–0 (1.000)	8–0 (1.000)	0–0 (–)
At-Large	76	Arizona State	Big 12	15th	4–16 (.200)	13–19 (.406)	13–19 (.406)	65	77	70	82	74	81	80	3–8 (.273)	5–2 (.714)	5–9 (.357)	4–14 (.222)	3–4 (.429)	2–1 (.667)	4–0 (1.000)	0–0 (–)
At-Large	86	Colorado	Big 12	16th	3–17 (.150)	14–20 (.412)	14–20 (.412)	81	82	81	100	86	91	93	0–10 (.000)	3–3 (.500)	11–7 (.611)	2–15 (.118)	4–5 (.444)	3–0 (1.000)	5–0 (1.000)	0–0 (–)
Automatic	88	Butler	Big East	T–8th	6–14 (.300)	14–19 (.424)	14–19 (.424)	77	65	77	135	83	97	118	2–9 (.182)	3–2 (.600)	9–8 (.529)	1–11 (.083)	4–6 (.400)	4–1 (.800)	5–1 (.833)	0–0 (–)
At-Large	90	Georgetown	Big East	7th	8–12 (.400)	17–15 (.531)	17–15 (.531)	94	84	87	129	88	82	98	3–9 (.250)	0–1 (.000)	14–5 (.737)	1–8 (.111)	4–4 (.500)	3–3 (.500)	9–0 (1.000)	0–0 (–)
At-Large	92	Oregon State	West Coast	5th	10–8 (.556)	19–12 (.613)	20–12 (.625)	91	98	85	113	85	108	90	3–7 (.300)	2–2 (.500)	15–3 (.833)	1–7 (.125)	2–2 (.500)	4–1 (.800)	12–2 (.857)	1–0 (1.000)
At-Large	110	Washington State	West Coast	T–6th	8–10 (.444)	19–14 (.576)	19–14 (.576)	106	114	124	116	112	106	105	4–7 (.364)	5–3 (.625)	10–4 (.714)	1–7 (.125)	3–5 (.375)	4–0 (1.000)	11–2 (.846)	0–0 (–)
At-Large	117	George Washington	Atlantic 10	T–7th	9–9 (.500)	20–12 (.625)	21–12 (.636)	116	116	113	119	124	126	135	5–6 (.455)	3–2 (.600)	13–4 (.765)	0–1 (.000)	2–5 (.286)	5–5 (.500)	13–1 (.929)	1–0 (1.000)
At-Large	122	DePaul	Big East	10th	4–16 (.200)	14–19 (.424)	14–19 (.424)	112	105	118	170	119	118	138	2–10 (.167)	1–1 (.500)	11–8 (.579)	0–11 (.000)	3–5 (.375)	3–3 (.500)	8–0 (1.000)	0–0 (–)
At-Large	150	Tulane	American Athletic	4th	12–6 (.667)	17–14 (.548)	19–14 (.576)	138	127	138	174	145	154	174	4–7 (.364)	1–4 (.200)	14–3 (.824)	0–3 (.000)	0–5 (.000)	5–4 (.556)	12–2 (.857)	2–0 (1.000)
	87		Average	9th	8–12 (.400)	17–15 (.531)	17–15 (.531)	80	77	82	103	84	89	94	3–8 (.273)	2–2 (.500)	12–5 (.706)	2–9 (.182)	4–4 (.500)	4–2 (.667)	8–1 (.889)	0–0 (–)

== Schedule ==
Game	Time	Matchup	Score	Box score	Attendance	Television
First round – March 31
1	12:00 pm	Utah vs. Butler	84–86	Box score	2,119	FS1
2	2:30 pm	George Washington vs. Boise State	59–89	Box score	2,119	FS1
3	5:30 pm	Nebraska vs. Arizona State	86–78	Box score	2,947	FS1
4	8:00 pm	Georgetown vs. Washington State	85–82	Box score	2,947	FS1
First round – April 1
5	12:00 pm	DePaul vs. Cincinnati	61–83	Box score	1,495	FS1
6	2:30 pm	Oregon State vs. UCF	75–76	Box score	1,495	FS1
7	5:30 pm	Colorado vs. Villanova	64–85	Box score	2,407	FS1
8	8:00 pm	Tulane vs. USC	60–89	Box score	2,407	FS1
Quarterfinals – April 2
9	4:00 pm	Butler vs. Boise State	93–100	Box score	2,512	FS1
10	6:30 pm	Nebraska vs. Georgetown	81–69	Box score	2,512	FS1
Quarterfinals – April 3
11	4:00 pm	Cincinnati vs. UCF	80–88	Box score	2,279	FS1
12	6:30 pm	Villanova vs. USC	60–59	Box score	2,279	FS1
Semifinals – April 5
13	10:30 am	Boise State vs. Nebraska	69–79	Box score	2,972	Fox
14	1:00 pm	UCF vs. Villanova	104–98 ^{OT}	Box score	2,972	Fox
Final – April 6
15	2:30 pm	Nebraska vs. UCF	77–66	Box score	3,314	Fox
Game times are Pacific Daylight Time.

== Bracket ==
First round MGM Grand Garden Arena; March 31 & April 1 FS1
Utah	84
Butler	86
George Washington	59
Boise State	89
Nebraska	86
Arizona State	78
Georgetown	85
Washington State	82
DePaul	61
Cincinnati	83
Oregon State	75
UCF	76
Colorado	64
Villanova	85
Tulane	60
USC	89

Quarterfinals; MGM Grand Garden Arena; April 2 & 3 FS1
Butler	93
Boise State	100
Nebraska	81
Georgetown	69
Cincinnati	80
UCF	88
Villanova	60
USC	59

Semifinals; T-Mobile Arena; April 5 Fox
Boise State	69
Nebraska	79
UCF	104
Villanova	98 ^{OT}

Final; T-Mobile Arena; April 6 Fox
Nebraska	77
UCF	66

== Quality of participating teams compared with NIT ==
Fox Sports leveraged its media rights relationships with the Big East, Big Ten, and Big 12 conferences to create the CBC and thereby create postseason college basketball content for itself. Each of those three conferences committed to send at least two teams to the CBC. In addition, non-NCAA tournament teams from those three conferences were contractually prohibited from playing in any other postseason tournament, including the 2025 National Invitation Tournament (NIT), if they declined an invitation or removed themselves from consideration for a bid to the CBC. Even if Big East, Big Ten, or Big 12 schools might have preferred to play NIT games at home instead of CBC games in Las Vegas or anticipated they might have more attractive matchups in the NIT, they did not have that option, which may have degraded the quality of the NIT field. No Big East or Big Ten teams appeared in the 2025 NIT, and Oklahoma State was the only Big 12 team to accept an NIT bid. Atlantic Coast Conference teams Georgia Tech, SMU, and Stanford were the only other power conference teams to accept bids to the NIT. In contrast, eleven of the sixteen CBC participants were from power conferences.

An analysis of the NET rankings as of Selection Sunday for the teams participating in the 2025 CBC and NIT is set forth in the table below.

CBC participants		NIT participants			
Team	NET	Team	NET	Team	NET
Boise State	44	SMU	46	Middle Tennessee	105
Cincinnati	50	Santa Clara	57	UAB	106
Villanova	55	UC Irvine	62	Loyola Chicago	107
Nebraska	59	San Francisco	64	Utah Valley	108
USC	70	North Texas	65	Georgia Tech	109
UCF	71	Dayton	67	Florida Atlantic	111
Utah	73	George Mason	68	North Alabama	113
Arizona State	74	Saint Joseph's	76	Northern Colorado	114
Butler	83	Bradley	80	Chattanooga	115
Oregon State	85	Stanford	81	Samford	116
Colorado	86	Northern Iowa	93	Jacksonville State	122
Georgetown	88	Arkansas State	94	Furman	127
Washington State	112	Oklahoma State	95	Kent State	128
DePaul	119	St. Bonaventure	97	Wichita State	134
George Washington	124	Saint Louis	101	UC Riverside	142
Tulane	145	Cal State Northridge	104	San Jose State	175
Mean: 84; Median: 79; Best: 44; Worst: 145		Top 16 teams Mean: 78; Median: 78; Best: 46; Worst: 104		All 32 teams Mean: 99; Median: 105; Best: 46; Worst: 175	

Like all metrics used to rank or rate college basketball teams, the NET is imperfect; however, it is consistently applied and represents one way in which teams can be compared. Since the NIT had to fill thirty-two tournament berths, whereas the CBC had only sixteen, data are shown for both the full NIT field as well as the top sixteen teams based on NET rankings. Of course, there are other metrics that could be used to compare the fields of the two tournaments, including the number of power conference teams participating.

== See also ==
- 2025 NCAA Division I men's basketball tournament
- 2025 National Invitation Tournament
- 2025 College Basketball Invitational
