= 2024–25 Cincinnati Bearcats men's basketball team =

American college basketball season

2024–25 Cincinnati Bearcats men's basketball

College Basketball Crown, Quarterfinals
- Conference: Big 12 Conference
- Record: 19–16 (7–13 Big 12)
- Head coach: Wes Miller (4th season)
- Associate head coach: Chad Dollar (4th season)
- Assistant coaches: Andre Morgan (4th season); Drew Adams (2nd season); Jaylen Stowe (1st season); Tim Buckley (1st season)
- Home arena: Fifth Third Arena

2024–25 Big 12 men's basketball standings
	Conf.				Overall
Team	W		L	PCT	W		L	PCT
No. 2 Houston †	19	–	1	.950	35	–	5	.875
No. 8 Texas Tech	15	–	5	.750	28	–	9	.757
No. 15 Arizona	14	–	6	.700	24	–	13	.649
No. 13 BYU	14	–	6	.700	26	–	10	.722
No. 17 Iowa State	13	–	7	.650	25	–	10	.714
Kansas	11	–	9	.550	21	–	13	.618
Baylor	10	–	10	.500	20	–	15	.571
West Virginia	10	–	10	.500	19	–	13	.594
TCU	9	–	11	.450	16	–	16	.500
Kansas State	9	–	11	.450	16	–	17	.485
Utah	8	–	12	.400	16	–	17	.485
Oklahoma State	7	–	13	.350	17	–	18	.486
Cincinnati	7	–	13	.350	19	–	16	.543
UCF	7	–	13	.350	20	–	17	.541
Arizona State	4	–	16	.200	13	–	20	.394
Colorado	3	–	17	.150	14	–	21	.400
† 2025 Big 12 tournament winner Rankings from AP poll

The 2024–25 Cincinnati Bearcats men's basketball team represented the University of Cincinnati during the 2024–25 NCAA Division I men's basketball season. The Bearcats, led by fourth-year head coach Wes Miller, played their home games at Fifth Third Arena in Cincinnati, Ohio as second-year members of the Big 12 Conference.

== Previous season ==
The Bearcats finished the season 22–15 and 7–11 in Big 12 play to finish in 11th place in the conference standings, thus earning the 11th seed in the 2024 Big 12 Tournament. They defeated West Virginia, and Kansas in the Big 12 tournament before losing to Baylor in the quarterfinals.

The Bearcats were invited to play in the NIT, where they defeated San Francisco and Bradley before falling to Indiana State in the quarterfinals.

== Offseason ==
=== Coaching staff changes ===
Former assistant coach Josh Loeffler accepted the head coaching job at Loyola. South Carolina assistant Tim Buckley was hired as an assistant coach. Jake Thelen, previously director of player development/assistant coach, accepted the head coaching job at Covington Catholic High School. Former UC graduate assistant Jaylen Stowe, an assistant coach/recruiting coordinator at High Point, was hired as an assistant coach.

=== Departures ===
Due to COVID-19, the NCAA ruled in October 2020 that the 2020–21 season would not count against the eligibility of any basketball player, thus giving all players the option to return in 2022–23. Additionally, any players who hde declared for the 2024 NBA draft—including seniors, who must opt into this year's draft—had the option to return if they made a timely withdrawal from the draft and ended any pre-draft relationships with agents.

Cincinnati Departures
Name	Pos.	Height	Weight	Year	Hometown	Reason for departure
John Newman III	G/F	6' 5"	215	Graduate student	Greensboro, NC	Completed college eligibility
Landen Long	G	5' 11"	185	Graduate student	Cincinnati, OH	Completed college eligibility
Ody Oguama	F	6' 9"	230	Graduate student	Raleigh, NC	Completed college eligibility
Viktor Lakhin	C	6' 11"	240	(redshirt) Junior	Anapa, Russia	Graduated; transferred to Clemson
Jamille Reynolds	F	6' 11"	275	Senior	St. Petersburg, FL	Transferred to South Florida
Sage Tolentino	C	7' 1"	240	(redshirt) Sophomore	Honolulu, HI	Transferred to UNC Asheville

=== Incoming transfers ===
Cincinnati incoming transfers
Name	Pos.	Height	Weight	Year	Hometown	Old school	Remaining eligibility
Arrinten Page	C	6' 11"	245	Sophomore	Atlanta, GA	USC	Three years
Connor Hickman	G	6' 3"	200	Senior	Bloomington, IN	Bradley	One year
Dillon Mitchell	F	6' 8"	205	Junior	Tampa, FL	Texas	Two years

=== Recruiting classes ===
==== 2024 recruiting class ====
College recruiting
Name	Hometown	School	Height	Weight	Commit date
Tyler Betsey; SF	Windsor, CT	St. Thomas More School	6 ft 8 in (2.03 m)	185 lb (84 kg)	Oct 6, 2023
Tyler Betsey; SF	Recruit ratings: Rivals: 247Sports: ESPN: (87)				
Tyler McKinley; PF	Cincinnati, OH	Winton Woods High School	6 ft 8 in (2.03 m)	220 lb (100 kg)	Nov 8, 2023
Tyler McKinley; PF	Recruit ratings: Rivals: 247Sports: ESPN: (83)				
Halvine Dzellat; PF/C	Loir-et-Cher, France	ADA Blois Basket 41	6 ft 10 in (2.08 m)	225 lb (102 kg)	Sep 11, 2024
Halvine Dzellat; PF/C	Recruit ratings: Rivals: 247Sports: ESPN: (NR)				
Overall recruit ranking:
Note: In many cases, Scout, Rivals, 247Sports, On3, and ESPN may conflict in their listings of height and weight.; In these cases, the average was taken. ESPN grades are on a 100-point scale.; Sources: "Cincinnati 2024 Basketball Commitments". Rivals.; "2024 Cincinnati Basketball Commits". ESPN.; "2024 Team Ranking". Rivals.; "Cincinnati 2024 Basketball Commits". 247Sports.

==== 2025 recruiting class ====
College recruiting (2025)
Name	Hometown	School	Height	Weight	Commit date
Keyshuan Tillery; PG	Albany, NY	New Hampton School	6 ft 0 in (1.83 m)	184 lb (83 kg)	Sep 20, 2024
Keyshuan Tillery; PG	Recruit ratings: Rivals: 247Sports: ESPN: (85)				
Shon Abaev; SF	Fort Lauderdale, FL	Calvary Christian Academy (Florida)	6 ft 8 in (2.03 m)	195 lb (88 kg)	Nov 28, 2024
Shon Abaev; SF	Recruit ratings: Rivals: 247Sports: ESPN: (88)				
Overall recruit ranking:
Note: In many cases, Scout, Rivals, 247Sports, On3, and ESPN may conflict in their listings of height and weight.; In these cases, the average was taken. ESPN grades are on a 100-point scale.; Sources: "Cincinnati 2025 Basketball Commitments". Rivals.; "2025 Cincinnati Basketball Commits". ESPN.; "2024 Team Ranking". Rivals.; "Cincinnati 2025 Basketball Commits". 247Sports.

== Preseason ==
Big 12 Preseason Poll

	Big 12 Coaches	Points
1.	Kansas	215 (9)
2.	Houston	211 (5)
3.	Iowa State	194 (1)
4.	Baylor	185
5.	Arizona	179 (1)
6.	Cincinnati	140
7.	Texas Tech	135
8.	Kansas State	133
9.	BYU	116
10.	TCU	90
11.	UCF	83
12.	Arizona State	64
13.	West Virginia	62
14.	Oklahoma State	46
15.	Colorado	37
16.	Utah	30
Reference: (#) first-place votes

Pre-Season All-Big 12 Team

First Team

Player	School
Caleb Love	Arizona
LJ Cryer	Houston
J’Wan Roberts	Houston
Tamin Lipsey	Iowa State
Hunter Dickinson†	Kansas
† denotes unanimous selection Reference:

Second Team

Player	School
Norchad Omier	Baylor
Jeremy Roach	Baylor
Keshon Gilbert	Iowa State
Dajuan Harris Jr	Kansas
Coleman Hawkins	Kansas State
† denotes unanimous selection Reference:

- Player of the Year: Hunter Dickinson, Kansas
- Co-Newcomer of the Year: Jeremy Roach, Baylor & Coleman Hawkins, Kansas State
- Freshman of the Year: V. J. Edgecombe, Baylor

== Roster ==
2024–25 Cincinnati Bearcats men's basketball team
Players
Coaches

Pos.	#	Name	Height	Weight	Year	Previous school	Hometown
G	0	Daniel Skillings	6 ft 6 in (1.98 m)	215 lb (98 kg)	Jr	Roman Catholic High School	Blackwood, NJ
G	1	Day Day Thomas	6 ft 1 in (1.85 m)	215 lb (98 kg)	Sr	Kilgore College	Columbia, SC
G	2	Jizzle James	6 ft 3 in (1.91 m)	205 lb (93 kg)	So	Olympia High School	Orlando, FL
G/F	3	Rayvon Griffith	6 ft 6 in (1.98 m)	210 lb (95 kg)	RS Fr	AZ Compass Prep School	Cincinnati, OH
G	5	CJ Fredrick	6 ft 3 in (1.91 m)	185 lb (84 kg)	GS	Kentucky	Cincinnati, OH
G	8	Connor Hickman	6 ft 3 in (1.91 m)	200 lb (91 kg)	Sr	Bradley	Bloomington, IN
G	10	Josh Reed	6 ft 7 in (2.01 m)	220 lb (100 kg)	Jr	Pace Academy	Atlanta, GA
G	11	CJ Anthony (W)	6 ft 0 in (1.83 m)	195 lb (88 kg)	Sr	Putnam Science Academy	Columbus, OH
F	14	Tyler Betsey	6 ft 8 in (2.03 m)	225 lb (102 kg)	Fr	St. Thomas More School	Windsor, CT
G	20	JJ Rembert (W)	5 ft 10 in (1.78 m)	155 lb (70 kg)	Fr	Nation Ford High School	Queens, NY
F	22	Arrinten Page	6 ft 11 in (2.11 m)	240 lb (109 kg)	So	USC	Atlanta, GA
F	23	Dillon Mitchell	6 ft 8 in (2.03 m)	210 lb (95 kg)	Jr	Texas	Tampa, FL
F	24	Tyler McKinley (injured)	6 ft 9 in (2.06 m)	240 lb (109 kg)	Fr	Winton Woods High School	Cincinnati, OH
G/F	41	Simas Lukošius	6 ft 8 in (2.03 m)	225 lb (102 kg)	Sr	Butler	Kaunas, Lithuania
C	55	Aziz Bandaogo	7 ft 0 in (2.13 m)	235 lb (107 kg)	GS	Utah Valley	Dakar, Senegal
F/C	65	Halvine Dzellat	6 ft 10 in (2.08 m)	225 lb (102 kg)	Fr	ADA Blois Basket 41	Loir-et-Cher, France

Head coach

- Wes Miller (North Carolina)

Assistant coach(es)

- Chad Dollar (South Florida)
- Andre Morgan (North Georgia)
- Drew Adams (Iowa)
- Tim Buckley (Bemidji State)
- Jaylen Stowe (Mercer)

Legend

- (C) Team captain
- (S) Suspended
- (I) Ineligible
- (W) Walk-on
- Injured
- Current redshirt

Roster
Last update: October 8, 2024

== Schedule and results ==
Date time, TV	Rank^{#}	Opponent^{#}	Result	Record	High points	High rebounds	High assists	Site (attendance) city, state
Exhibition
October 18, 2024; 7:00 p.m.	No. 20	Ohio State; CareSource Exhibition Game for Mental Health	W 80–62	–	12 – Tied	7 – Mitchell	6 – Thomas	Fifth Third Arena; Cincinnati, OH
Regular season
November 4, 2024; 7:00 p.m., ESPN+	No. 20	Arkansas–Pine Bluff	W 109–54	1–0	20 – Lukošius	11 – Skillings	10 – James	Fifth Third Arena (10,290); Cincinnati, OH
November 8, 2024; 7:00 p.m., ESPN+	No. 20	Morehead State	W 83–56	2–0	14 – Tied	9 – Mitchell	6 – Lukošius	Fifth Third Arena (10,604); Cincinnati, OH
November 15, 2024; 7:00 p.m., ESPN+	No. 17	Nicholls; Twyman-Stokes Classic	W 86–49	3–0	19 – Tied	9 – Mitchell	6 – Lukošius	Fifth Third Arena (10,485); Cincinnati, OH
November 19, 2024; 7:00 p.m., FDSNOH	No. 18	at Northern Kentucky; Twyman-Stokes Classic	W 76–60	4–0	18 – Lukošius	6 – Mitchell	6 – James	Truist Arena (7,485); Highland Heights, KY
November 23, 2024; 2:00 p.m., ACCNX/ESPN+	No. 18	at Georgia Tech	W 81–58	5–0	14 – Tied	11 – Mitchell	7 – James	McCamish Pavilion (4,970); Atlanta, GA
November 27, 2024; 7:00 p.m., ESPN+	No. 16	Alabama State	W 77–59	6–0	16 – Lukošius	9 – Bandaogo	5 – James	Fifth Third Arena (10,970); Cincinnati, OH
December 3, 2024; 6:30 p.m., FS1	No. 14	at Villanova; Big East–Big 12 Battle	L 60–68	6–1	19 – James	5 – Tied	5 – James	Finneran Pavilion (6,501); Villanova, PA
December 8, 2024; 2:00 p.m., ESPN+	No. 14	Howard	W 84–67	7–1	18 – Lukošius	8 – Page	4 – Lukošius	Fifth Third Arena (10,913); Cincinnati, OH
December 14, 2024; 2:00 p.m., ESPN+	No. 22	Xavier; Crosstown Shootout	W 68–65	8–1	14 – Lukošius	10 – Mitchell	5 – James	Fifth Third Arena (12,513); Cincinnati, OH
December 20, 2024; 8:30 p.m., ESPNU	No. 19	vs. No. 22 Dayton; Simple Truth Hoops Classic	W 66–59	9–1	17 – Skillings Jr.	7 – Mitchell	3 – James	Heritage Bank Center (15,107); Cincinnati, OH
December 22, 2024; 4:00 p.m., ESPN+	No. 19	Grambling State	W 84–49	10–1	15 – Bandaogo	7 – Mitchell	8 – James	Fifth Third Arena (11,175); Cincinnati, OH
Big 12 regular season
December 30, 2024; 7:00 p.m., CBSSN	No. 16	at Kansas State	L 66–70	10–2 (0–1)	15 – Mitchell	11 – Mitchell	4 – James	Bramlage Coliseum (9,970); Manhattan, KS
January 4, 2025; 2:30 p.m., ESPN2	No. 16	Arizona	L 67–72	10–3 (0–2)	18 – Skillings Jr.	9 – Bandaogo	5 – James	Fifth Third Arena (11,212); Cincinnati, OH
January 7, 2025; 8:00 p.m., ESPN+		at Baylor	L 48–68	10–4 (0–3)	18 – Skillings Jr.	5 – James	5 – Lukošius	Foster Pavilion (7,500); Waco, TX
January 11, 2025; 2:00 p.m., ESPN+		No. 11 Kansas	L 40–54	10–5 (0–4)	10 – Mitchell	8 – Bandaogo	3 – Lukošius	Fifth Third Arena (12,003); Cincinnati, OH
January 15, 2025; 9:00 p.m., ESPN+		at Colorado	W 68–62	11–5 (1–4)	16 – Lukošius	10 – Bandaogo	2 – Tied	CU Events Center (6,576); Boulder, CO
January 18, 2025; 2:00 p.m., CBSSN		Arizona State	W 67–60	12–5 (2–4)	14 – Mitchell	9 – Bandaogo	4 – Thomas	Fifth Third Arena (11,090); Cincinnati, OH
January 21, 2025; 7:00 p.m., ESPNU		Texas Tech	L 71–81	12–6 (2–5)	17 – James	5 – Skillings Jr.	3 – Tied	Fifth Third Arena (10,790); Cincinnati, OH
January 25, 2025; 10:30 p.m., ESPN2		at BYU	L 52–80	12–7 (2–6)	14 – Lukošius	5 – Mitchell	5 – James	Marriott Center (17,483); Provo, UT
January 28, 2025; 10:00 p.m., CBSSN		at Utah	L 66–69	12–8 (2–7)	18 – James	6 – Mitchell	4 – Tied	Jon M. Huntsman Center (7,570); Salt Lake City, UT
February 2, 2025; 2:00 p.m., ESPN+		West Virginia rivalry	L 50–63	12–9 (2–8)	10 – Thomas	10 – Mitchell	3 – Mitchell	Fifth Third Arena (11,085); Cincinnati, OH
February 5, 2025; 7:00 p.m., CBSSN		at UCF	W 93–83	13–9 (3–8)	20 – Thomas	6 – Tied	6 – Thomas	Addition Financial Arena (7,421); Orlando, FL
February 8, 2025; 6:00 p.m., ESPN2		BYU	W 84–66	14–9 (4–8)	24 – James	6 – Bandaogo	4 – Thomas	Fifth Third Arena (12,217); Cincinnati, OH
February 11, 2025; 7:00 p.m., ESPN+		Utah	W 85–75	15–9 (5–8)	25 – James	10 – Bandaogo	6 – James	Fifth Third Arena (10,510); Cincinnati, OH
February 15, 2025; 4:00 p.m., ESPN2		at No. 10 Iowa State	L 70–81	15–10 (5–9)	25 – James	5 – Mitchell	4 – Thomas	Hilton Coliseum (14,267); Ames, IA
February 19, 2025; 7:00 p.m., ESPN2		at West Virginia rivalry	L 59–62	15–11 (5–10)	13 – Tied	10 – Bandaogo	3 – Tied	WVU Coliseum (10,683); Morgantown, WV
February 22, 2025; 12:00 p.m., ESPN2		TCU	W 75–63	16–11 (6–10)	18 – James	13 – Mitchell	4 – James	Fifth Third Arena (10,648); Cincinnati, OH
February 25, 2025; 7:00 p.m., ESPN2		Baylor	W 69–67	17–11 (7–10)	18 – James	9 – Mitchell	4 – Thomas	Fifth Third Arena (10,598); Cincinnati, OH
March 1, 2025; 4:30 p.m., CBS		at No. 4 Houston	L 64–73	17–12 (7–11)	19 – Thomas	8 – Bandaogo	5 – James	Fertitta Center (7,035); Houston, TX
March 5, 2025; 7:00 p.m., ESPN+		Kansas State	L 49–54	17–13 (7–12)	12 – Thomas	7 – Tied	5 – Lukošius	Fifth Third Arena (10,814); Cincinnati, OH
March 8, 2025; 3:00 p.m., ESPN+		at Oklahoma State	L 67–78	17–14 (7–13)	17 – James	9 – Reed	4 – Tied	Gallagher-Iba Arena (6,597); Stillwater, OK
Big 12 tournament
March 11, 2025; 12:30 p.m., ESPN+	(13)	vs. (12) Oklahoma State; First round	W 87–68	18–14	21 – Thomas	15 – Mitchell	5 – Mitchell	T-Mobile Center (6,406); Kansas City, MO
March 13, 2025; 12:30 p.m., ESPN	(13)	vs. (5) No. 12 Iowa State; Second round	L 56–73	18−15	17 – James	5 – Mitchell	4 – Thomas	T-Mobile Center (12,922); Kansas City, MO
College Basketball Crown
April 1, 2025*; 3:00 p.m., FS1	(2)	vs. (15) DePaul; First round	W 83−61	19−15	15 – Mitchell	7 – Mitchell	5 – Thomas	MGM Grand Garden Arena (1,495); Paradise, NV
April 3, 2025*; 7:00 p.m., FS1		vs. UCF; Quarterfinals	L 80–88	19–16	19 – Thomas	12 – Mitchell	6 – Mitchell	MGM Grand Garden Arena (2,279); Paradise, NV
*Non-conference game. ^{#}Rankings from AP poll. (#) Tournament seedings in parentheses. All times are in Eastern Time.

== Rankings ==
Ranking movements Legend: ██ Increase in ranking ██ Decrease in ranking — = Not ranked RV = Received votes
	Week																				
Poll	Pre	1	2	3	4	5	6	7	8	9	10	11	12	13	14	15	16	17	18	19	Final
AP	20	17	18	16	14	22	19	17	16	RV	RV	RV	—	—	—	—	—	—	—	—	—
Coaches	20	17	16	14	14	23	20	17	17	RV	—	—	—	—	—	—	—	—	—	—	—
