= 2024–25 TCU Horned Frogs men's basketball team =

American college basketball season

2024–25 TCU Horned Frogs men's basketball
- Conference: Big 12 Conference
- Record: 16–16 (9–11 Big 12)
- Head coach: Jamie Dixon (9th season)
- Associate head coach: Tony Benford
- Assistant coaches: Duane Broussard; Jamie McNeilly
- Home arena: Schollmaier Arena

2024–25 Big 12 men's basketball standings
	Conf.				Overall
Team	W		L	PCT	W		L	PCT
No. 2 Houston †	19	–	1	.950	35	–	5	.875
No. 8 Texas Tech	15	–	5	.750	28	–	9	.757
No. 15 Arizona	14	–	6	.700	24	–	13	.649
No. 13 BYU	14	–	6	.700	26	–	10	.722
No. 17 Iowa State	13	–	7	.650	25	–	10	.714
Kansas	11	–	9	.550	21	–	13	.618
Baylor	10	–	10	.500	20	–	15	.571
West Virginia	10	–	10	.500	19	–	13	.594
TCU	9	–	11	.450	16	–	16	.500
Kansas State	9	–	11	.450	16	–	17	.485
Utah	8	–	12	.400	16	–	17	.485
Oklahoma State	7	–	13	.350	17	–	18	.486
Cincinnati	7	–	13	.350	19	–	16	.543
UCF	7	–	13	.350	20	–	17	.541
Arizona State	4	–	16	.200	13	–	20	.394
Colorado	3	–	17	.150	14	–	21	.400
† 2025 Big 12 tournament winner Rankings from AP poll

The 2024–25 TCU Horned Frogs men's basketball team represented Texas Christian University during the 2024–25 NCAA Division I men's basketball season. The team was led by ninth-year head coach Jamie Dixon and played their home games at Schollmaier Arena located in Fort Worth, Texas as a member of the Big 12 Conference.

== Previous season ==
The Horned Frogs finished the 2023–24 season 21–13, 9–9 in Big 12 play to finish in a tie for seventh place. Due to a tiebreaker, as the No. 8 seed in the Big 12 tournament, they defeated Oklahoma in the second round, before losing to Houston in the quarterfinals. They received an at-large bid to the NCAA tournament as the No. 9 seed in the West Region, where they were defeated by Utah State in the first round.

== Offseason ==
=== Departures ===
Name	Number	Pos.	Height	Weight	Year	Hometown	Reason for departure
Micah Peavy	0	G	6'8"	215	Senior	Cibolo, TX	Transferred to Georgetown
Emanuel Miller	2	F	6'7"	217	GS senior	Scarborough, ON	Graduated/undrafted in 2024 NBA draft; signed with the Dallas Mavericks
Avery Anderson III	3	G	6'3"	170	GS senior	Justin, TX	Graduated
Jameer Nelson Jr.	4	G	6'2"	205	(redshirt) Senior	Haverford, PA	Graduated
Chuck O'Bannon Jr.	5	F	6'7"	220	(redshirt) Senior	Las Vegas, NV	Graduated
Trevian Tennyson	11	G	6'4"	180	GS senior	Arlington, TX	Graduated
Xavier Cork	12	F	6'9"	235	Senior	Sulphur Springs, TX	Graduated
JaKobe Coles	21	F	6'8"	216	Junior	Denton, TX	Transferred to Grand Canyon
Tyler Lundblade	22	G	6'7"	212	(redshirt) Sophomore	Dallas, TX	Transferred to Belmont
Darius Ford	30	G	5'11"	155	Junior	Fort Worth, TX	Walk-on; transferred to Alabama A&M
Essam Mostafa	44	C	6'9"	250	(redshirt) Senior	Cairo, Egypt	Transferred to Middle Tennessee
Zach Gonsoulin	55	G	6'0"	157	Sophomore	Houston, TX	Walk-on; transferred to UTSA

=== Incoming transfers ===
Name	Number	Pos.	Height	Weight	Year	Hometown	Previous school
Brendan Wenzel	0	G	6'7"	208	GS senior	San Antonio, TX	Wyoming
Vasean Allette	3	G	6'3"	175	Sophomore	Toronto, ON	Old Dominion
Frankie Collins	11	G	6'1"	185	Senior	Sacramento, CA	Arizona State
Trazarien White	13	F	6'7"	190	Senior	Mansfield, TX	UNC Wilmington
Noah Reynolds	21	G	6'3"	200	Senior	Peoria, IL	Green Bay
R.J. Jones	24	G	6'3"	175	Sophomore	Denton, TX	Kansas State

=== Recruiting classes ===
==== 2024 recruiting class ====
College recruiting
Name	Hometown	School	Height	Weight	Commit date
Micah Robinson #6 SF	Dallas, TX	Oak Hill Academy	6 ft 6 in (1.98 m)	210 lb (95 kg)	Sep 23, 2023
Micah Robinson #6 SF	Recruit ratings: Rivals: 247Sports: ESPN: (86)				
David Punch #12 PF	Harker Heights, TX	Harker Heights High School	6 ft 8 in (2.03 m)	220 lb (100 kg)	Oct 21, 2023
David Punch #12 PF	Recruit ratings: Rivals: 247Sports: ESPN: (82)				
Malick Diallo #40 C	Draper, UT	Wasatch Academy	6 ft 8 in (2.03 m)	220 lb (100 kg)	Oct 12, 2023
Malick Diallo #40 C	Recruit ratings: Rivals: 247Sports: ESPN: (79)				
Ashton Simmons #23 SG	Beaumont, TX	West Brook Senior High School	6 ft 2 in (1.88 m)	170 lb (77 kg)	Oct 11, 2023
Ashton Simmons #23 SG	Recruit ratings: Rivals: 247Sports: ESPN: (78)				
Overall recruit ranking:
Note: In many cases, Scout, Rivals, 247Sports, On3, and ESPN may conflict in their listings of height and weight.; In these cases, the average was taken. ESPN grades are on a 100-point scale.; Sources: "2024 TCU Commits". Rivals.; "2024 Team Ranking". Rivals.

== Preseason ==
Big 12 Preseason Poll

	Big 12 Coaches	Points
1.	Kansas	215 (9)
2.	Houston	211 (5)
3.	Iowa State	194 (1)
4.	Baylor	185
5.	Arizona	179 (1)
6.	Cincinnati	140
7.	Texas Tech	135
8.	Kansas State	133
9.	BYU	116
10.	TCU	90
11.	UCF	83
12.	Arizona State	64
13.	West Virginia	62
14.	Oklahoma State	46
15.	Colorado	37
16.	Utah	30
Reference: (#) first-place votes

Pre-Season All-Big 12 Team

First Team

Player	School
Caleb Love	Arizona
LJ Cryer	Houston
J’Wan Roberts	Houston
Tamin Lipsey	Iowa State
Hunter Dickinson†	Kansas
† denotes unanimous selection Reference:

Second Team

Player	School
Norchad Omier	Baylor
Jeremy Roach	Baylor
Keshon Gilbert	Iowa State
Dajuan Harris Jr	Kansas
Coleman Hawkins	Kansas State
† denotes unanimous selection Reference:

- Player of the Year: Hunter Dickinson, Kansas
- Co-Newcomer of the Year: Jeremy Roach, Baylor & Coleman Hawkins, Kansas State
- Freshman of the Year: V. J. Edgecombe, Baylor

== Roster ==
2024–25 TCU Horned Frogs men's basketball team
Players
Coaches

Pos.	#	Name	Height	Weight	Year	Previous school	Hometown
G	0	Brendan Wenzel	6 ft 8 in (2.03 m)	218 lb (99 kg)	GS	Wyoming	San Antonio, Texas
F	1	Isaiah Manning	6 ft 8 in (2.03 m)	220 lb (100 kg)	So	Mansfield Legacy High School	Mansfield, Texas
G	3	Vasean Allette	6 ft 2 in (1.88 m)	174 lb (79 kg)	So	Old Dominion	Toronto, Ontario
F	5	Micah Robinson	6 ft 6 in (1.98 m)	190 lb (86 kg)	Fr	Oak Hill Academy (VA)	Kansas City, Missouri
G	6	Ashton Simmons	6 ft 3 in (1.91 m)	193 lb (88 kg)	Fr	West Brook High School	Beaumont, Texas
C	8	Ernest Udeh Jr.	6 ft 11 in (2.11 m)	263 lb (119 kg)	Jr	Kansas	Orlando, Florida
G	11	Frankie Collins	6 ft 2 in (1.88 m)	186 lb (84 kg)	Sr	Arizona State	Sacramento, California
F	13	Trazarien White	6 ft 6 in (1.98 m)	182 lb (83 kg)	Sr	UNC Wilmington	Mansfield, Texas
F	15	David Punch	6 ft 7 in (2.01 m)	220 lb (100 kg)	Fr	Harker Heights High School	Harker Heights, Texas
G	21	Noah Reynolds	6 ft 3 in (1.91 m)	193 lb (88 kg)	Sr	Green Bay	Peoria, Illinois
C	22	Adam Stewart (W)	6 ft 10 in (2.08 m)	240 lb (109 kg)	Fr	Salt Lake Academy (UT)	Waller, Texas
G	24	R.J. Jones	6 ft 3 in (1.91 m)	178 lb (81 kg)	So	Kansas State	Denton, Texas
G	30	Drew McElroy (W)	6 ft 2 in (1.88 m)	178 lb (81 kg)	So	Highland Park High School	Dallas, Texas
C	32	Malick Diallo	6 ft 9 in (2.06 m)	234 lb (106 kg)	Fr	Wasatch Academy	Bamako, Mali
G	33	Trey Stuart (W)	6 ft 2 in (1.88 m)	175 lb (79 kg)	RS So	Brock High School	Weatherford, Texas
G	35	Cole Despie (W)	6 ft 3 in (1.91 m)	168 lb (76 kg)	RS So	Bellarmine College Prep	San Jose, California
F	41	Jace Posey	6 ft 5 in (1.96 m)	206 lb (93 kg)	RS Fr	Strake Jesuit College Prep	Houston, Texas

Head coach

- Jamie Dixon (TCU)

Assistant coach(es)

- Tony Benford (Texas Tech)
- Duane Broussard (Bradley)
- Jamie McNeilly (LSU New Orleans)

Legend

- (C) Team captain
- (S) Suspended
- (I) Ineligible
- (W) Walk-on
- Injured
- Current redshirt

Roster

== Schedule and results ==
Date time, TV	Rank^{#}	Opponent^{#}	Result	Record	High points	High rebounds	High assists	Site (attendance) city, state
Exhibition
November 1, 2024*; 7:00 p.m.		vs. No. 16 Arkansas	W 66–65		13 – Udeh Jr.	8 – Udeh Jr.	6 – Collins	Dickies Arena (4,407); Fort Worth, TX
Non-conference regular season
November 4, 2024*; 7:00 p.m., ESPN+		Florida A&M	W 83–44	1–0	20 – Allette	12 – Udeh	7 – Reynolds	Schollmaier Arena (5,127); Fort Worth, TX
November 8, 2024*; 7:00 p.m., ESPN+		Florida Gulf Coast	W 67–51	2–0	14 – Allette	9 – Wenzel	5 – Reynolds	Schollmaier Arena (5,026); Fort Worth, TX
November 12, 2024*; 7:00 p.m., ESPN+		Texas State	W 76–71	3–0	17 – Reynolds	10 – Udeh	6 – Collins	Schollmaier Arena (4,815); Fort Worth, TX
November 15, 2024*; 5:00 p.m., FS1		at Michigan	L 64–76	3–1	16 – White	7 – Punch	3 – Collins	Crisler Center (12,707); Ann Arbor, MI
November 19, 2024*; 7:00 p.m., ESPN+		Alcorn State; Acrisure Invitational campus site game	W 71–48	4–1	16 – White	7 – Punch	6 – Reynolds	Schollmaier Arena (4,707); Fort Worth, TX
November 28, 2024*; 3:00 p.m., TruTV		vs. Santa Clara; Acrisure Invitational semifinals	L 52–69	4–2	15 – Collins	12 – Udeh Jr.	3 – Collins	Acrisure Arena (320); Thousand Palms, CA
November 29, 2024*; 1:00 p.m., TruTV		vs. Colorado State; Acrisure Invitational 3rd place game	L 72–76 ^{OT}	4–3	16 – Collins	8 – Collins	5 – Collins	Acrisure Arena (835); Thousand Palms, CA
December 5, 2024*; 7:00 p.m., ESPN+		Xavier; Big East–Big 12 Battle	W 76–72	5–3	16 – Collins	7 – Collins	5 – Collins	Schollmaier Arena (5,156); Fort Worth, TX
December 8, 2024*; 11:30 a.m., ESPNU		vs. Vanderbilt; Coast-to-Coast Challenge	L 74–83	5–4	11 – Tied	7 – Punch	7 – Collins	Dickies Arena; Fort Worth, TX
December 16, 2024*; 7:00 p.m., ESPN+		South Alabama	W 58–49	6–4	14 – Allette	11 – Udeh Jr.	4 – Reynolds	Schollmaier Arena (4,781); Fort Worth, TX
December 22, 2024*; 1:00 p.m., ESPN+		Montana State	W 82–48	7–4	15 – Reynolds	10 – Diallo	5 – Reynolds	Schollmaier Arena (5,135); Fort Worth, TX
Big 12 regular season
December 30, 2024; 7:00 p.m., ESPN+		at Arizona	L 81–90	7–5 (0–1)	23 – Reynolds	14 – Udeh	7 – Reynolds	McKale Center (13,560); Tucson, AZ
January 4, 2025; 3:00 p.m., CBSSN		Kansas State	W 63–62	8–5 (1–1)	18 – Reynolds	12 – Udeh	4 – Udeh	Schollmaier Arena (6,108); Fort Worth, TX
January 6, 2025; 8:00 p.m., ESPN2		at No. 12 Houston	L 46–65	8–6 (1–2)	19 – Reynolds	5 – Tied	1 – Tied	Fertitta Center (7,035); Houston, TX
January 11, 2025; 1:00 p.m., ESPN2		BYU	W 71–67	9–6 (2–2)	21 – Reynolds	4 – Punch	5 – Allette	Schollmaier Arena (4,752); Fort Worth, TX
January 15, 2025; 7:00 p.m., ESPN+		Utah	L 65–73	9–7 (2–3)	19 – Allette	9 – Allette	4 – Allette	Schollmaier Arena (5,459); Fort Worth, TX
January 19, 2025; 4:00 p.m., ESPN		at No. 25 Baylor	W 74–71	10–7 (3–3)	17 – Wenzel	15 – Udeh	5 – Allette	Foster Pavilion (7,500); Waco, TX
January 22, 2025; 6:00 p.m., ESPN2		No. 12 Kansas	L 61–74	10–8 (3–4)	14 – Reynolds	8 – Udeh	3 – Allette	Schollmaier Arena (6,055); Fort Worth, TX
January 25, 2025; 3:00 p.m., ESPN+		at UCF	L 58–85	10–9 (3–5)	15 – Allette	6 – Punch	4 – Allette	Addition Financial Arena (8,003); Orlando, FL
January 29, 2025; 6:00 p.m., ESPN2		at No. 22 Texas Tech	L 57–71	10–10 (3–6)	14 – Reynolds	6 – Tied	3 – Reynolds	United Supermarkets Arena (14,114); Lubbock, TX
February 2, 2025; 3:00 p.m., ESPN+		Colorado	W 68–57	11–10 (4–6)	19 – Punch	7 – Udeh	6 – Tied	Schollmaier Arena (5,029); Fort Worth, TX
February 5, 2025; 7:00 p.m., ESPN+		West Virginia	W 65–60	12–10 (5–6)	22 – Allette	11 – Allette	5 – Allette	Schollmaier Arena (4,878); Fort Worth, TX
February 8, 2025; 12:00 p.m., ESPN+		at No. 8 Iowa State; College GameDay	L 52–82	12–11 (5–7)	9 – Tied	5 – Tied	5 – Allette	Hilton Coliseum (14,267); Ames, IA
February 12, 2025; 6:00 p.m., CBSSN		Oklahoma State	W 73–71	13–11 (6–7)	16 – Allette	6 – Allette	8 – Reynolds	Schollmaier Arena (5,424); Fort Worth, TX
February 15, 2025; 7:00 p.m., ESPN+		at Arizona State	W 74–70	14–11 (7–7)	20 – Posey	7 – Allette	3 – Allette	Desert Financial Arena (9,026); Tempe, AZ
February 18, 2025; 7:00 p.m., ESPN+		No. 9 Texas Tech	W 69–66	15–11 (8–7)	16 – Tied	10 – White	5 – Allette	Schollmaier Arena (6,339); Fort Worth, TX
February 22, 2025; 11:00 a.m., ESPN2		at Cincinnati	L 63–75	15–12 (8–8)	18 – Punch	6 – Tied	4 – Allette	Fifth Third Arena (10,648); Cincinnati, OH
February 25, 2025; 8:00 p.m., CBSSN		at West Virginia	L 55–73	15–13 (8–9)	11 – White	6 – Diallo	4 – Allette	WVU Coliseum (10,167); Morgantown, WV
March 1, 2025; 3:00 p.m., ESPN+		UCF	W 89–78	16–13 (9–9)	17 – Allette	11 – Udeh	9 – Allette	Schollmaier Arena (5,477); Fort Worth, TX
March 4, 2025; 7:00 p.m., ESPN+		Baylor	L 58–61	16–14 (9–10)	16 – Reynolds	8 – Udeh	4 – Tied	Schollmaier Arena (6,621); Fort Worth, TX
March 8, 2025; 3:00 p.m., ESPN+		at Colorado	L 56–76	16–15 (9–11)	12 – Reynolds	5 – Tied	3 – Allette	CU Events Center (7,057); Boulder, CO
Big 12 tournament
March 11, 2025; 2:00 p.m., ESPN+	(9)	vs. (16) Colorado; First round	L 67–69	16–16	17 – Reynolds	11 – Udeh	2 – Tied	T-Mobile Center (6,406); Kansas City, MO
*Non-conference game. ^{#}Rankings from AP Poll. (#) Tournament seedings in parentheses. All times are in Central Time.
