= 2024–25 Oklahoma State Cowboys basketball team =

American college basketball season

2024–25 Oklahoma State Cowboys basketball

NIT, Quarterfinals
- Conference: Big 12 Conference
- Record: 17–18 (7–13 Big 12)
- Head coach: Steve Lutz (1st season)
- Associate head coach: James Miller
- Assistant coaches: Jeremy Cox; Mike Ekanem; Robert Guster; Keiton Page
- Home arena: Gallagher-Iba Arena

2024–25 Big 12 men's basketball standings
	Conf.				Overall
Team	W		L	PCT	W		L	PCT
No. 2 Houston †	19	–	1	.950	35	–	5	.875
No. 8 Texas Tech	15	–	5	.750	28	–	9	.757
No. 15 Arizona	14	–	6	.700	24	–	13	.649
No. 13 BYU	14	–	6	.700	26	–	10	.722
No. 17 Iowa State	13	–	7	.650	25	–	10	.714
Kansas	11	–	9	.550	21	–	13	.618
Baylor	10	–	10	.500	20	–	15	.571
West Virginia	10	–	10	.500	19	–	13	.594
TCU	9	–	11	.450	16	–	16	.500
Kansas State	9	–	11	.450	16	–	17	.485
Utah	8	–	12	.400	16	–	17	.485
Oklahoma State	7	–	13	.350	17	–	18	.486
Cincinnati	7	–	13	.350	19	–	16	.543
UCF	7	–	13	.350	20	–	17	.541
Arizona State	4	–	16	.200	13	–	20	.394
Colorado	3	–	17	.150	14	–	21	.400
† 2025 Big 12 tournament winner Rankings from AP poll

The 2024–25 Oklahoma State Cowboys basketball team represented Oklahoma State University during the 2024–25 NCAA Division I men's basketball season. The team, led by first-year head coach Steve Lutz, played their home games at Gallagher-Iba Arena located in Stillwater, Oklahoma as a member of the Big 12 Conference.

== Previous season ==
The Cowboys finished the 2023–24 season 12–20, 4–14 in Big 12 play to finish in a tie for last place. They were defeated by UCF in the first round of the Big 12 tournament.

== Offseason ==
=== Departures ===
Departures
Name	Number	Pos.	Height	Weight	Year	Hometown	Reason for departure
Naz Brown	0	G	6'0"	181	Sophomore	Fort Worth, Texas	Transferred to Coastal Carolina
Eric Dailey Jr.	2	F	6'8"	230	Freshman	Palmetto, Florida	Transferred to UCLA
Jarius Hicklen	4	G	6'4"	180	Graduate student	Dallas, Texas	Exhausted eligibility
Quion Williams	5	G	6'5"	220	Sophomore	Jonesboro, Arkansas	Transferred to Abilene Christian
Javon Small	12	G	6'3"	195	Junior	South Bend, Indiana	Transferred to West Virginia
Carson Sager	15	G	6'4"	207	Senior	Wichita Falls, Texas	Graduated
Justin McBride	21	F	6'8"	230	Freshman	Plano, Texas	Transferred to Nevada
Brooks Manzer	22	G	6'3"	190	Junior	Edmond, Oklahoma	Walk on; didn't return
Brandon Garrison	23	C	6'11"	245	Freshman	Oklahoma City, Oklahoma	Transferred to Kentucky
Mike Marsh	32	C	6'10"	250	RS Senior	Columbia, South Carolina	Graduated
Weston Church	35	G	6'3"	180	Senior	Fairview, Oklahoma	Graduated
John-Michael Wright	51	G	6'1"	190	Graduate student	Fayetteville, North Carolina	Exhausted eligibility

=== Incoming transfers ===
Incoming transfers
Name	Number	Pos.	Height	Weight	Year	Hometown	Previous school
Marchelus Avery	0	F	6'8"	210	Fifth year	Richmond, Virginia	UCF
Arturo Dean	2	G	5'11"	170	Junior	Miami, Florida	FIU
Davonte Davis	4	G	6'4"	185	Fifth year	Jacksonville, Arkansas	Arkansas
Khalil Brantley	5	G	6'1"	180	Senior	Bronx, New York	La Salle
Brandon Newman	6	G	6'5"	200	Graduate student	Valparaiso, Indiana	Western Kentucky
Kirk Cole	7	G	6'1"	165	Junior	Yukon, Oklahoma	Troy
Mikey Kelvin II	23	F	6'6"	200	Fifth year	Ottawa, Ontario	Queen's (ON)
Patrick Suemnick	24	F	6'8"	225	Graduate student	Green Bay, Wisconsin	West Virginia
Robert Jennings II	25	F	6'7"	230	Junior	DeSoto, Texas	Texas Tech
Abou Ousmane	33	F	6'10"	245	Fifth year	Brooklyn, New York	Xavier
Tyler Caron	34	F	6'8"	210	Graduate student	Longview, Texas	St. Mary's (TX)
C.J. Smith	55	F	6'7"	205	Sophomore	Oklahoma City, Oklahoma	Coffeyville Community College

=== Recruiting class ===
There were no recruits in the 2024 class.

== Preseason ==
Big 12 Preseason Poll

	Big 12 Coaches	Points
1.	Kansas	215 (9)
2.	Houston	211 (5)
3.	Iowa State	194 (1)
4.	Baylor	185
5.	Arizona	179 (1)
6.	Cincinnati	140
7.	Texas Tech	135
8.	Kansas State	133
9.	BYU	116
10.	TCU	90
11.	UCF	83
12.	Arizona State	64
13.	West Virginia	62
14.	Oklahoma State	46
15.	Colorado	37
16.	Utah	30
Reference: (#) first-place votes

Pre-Season All-Big 12 Team

First Team

Player	School
Caleb Love	Arizona
LJ Cryer	Houston
J’Wan Roberts	Houston
Tamin Lipsey	Iowa State
Hunter Dickinson†	Kansas
† denotes unanimous selection Reference:

Second Team

Player	School
Norchad Omier	Baylor
Jeremy Roach	Baylor
Keshon Gilbert	Iowa State
Dajuan Harris Jr.	Kansas
Coleman Hawkins	Kansas State
† denotes unanimous selection Reference:

- Player of the Year: Hunter Dickinson, Kansas
- Co-Newcomer of the Year: Jeremy Roach, Baylor & Coleman Hawkins, Kansas State
- Freshman of the Year: V. J. Edgecombe, Baylor

== Roster ==
2024–25 Oklahoma State Cowboys men's basketball team
Players
Coaches

Pos.	#	Name	Height	Weight	Year	Previous school	Hometown
F	0	Marchelus Avery (5Y)	6 ft 8 in (2.03 m)	210 lb (95 kg)	Sr	UCF	Richmond, Virginia
G	1	Bryce Thompson	6 ft 6 in (1.98 m)	200 lb (91 kg)	GS	Kansas	Tulsa, Oklahoma
G	2	Arturo Dean	5 ft 11 in (1.8 m)	170 lb (77 kg)	Jr	FIU	Miami, Florida
G	4	Davonte Davis (5Y)	6 ft 4 in (1.93 m)	185 lb (84 kg)	Sr	Arkansas	Jacksonville, Arkansas
G	5	Khalil Brantley	6 ft 1 in (1.85 m)	180 lb (82 kg)	Sr	La Salle	Bronx, New York
G	6	Brandon Newman	6 ft 5 in (1.96 m)	200 lb (91 kg)	GS	Western Kentucky	Valparaiso, Indiana
G	7	Kirk Cole	6 ft 1 in (1.85 m)	165 lb (75 kg)	Jr	Troy	Yukon, Oklahoma
G	13	Connor Dow	6 ft 6 in (1.98 m)	200 lb (91 kg)	So	Broken Arrow High School	Broken Arrow, Oklahoma
G	14	Jamyron Keller	6 ft 3 in (1.91 m)	210 lb (95 kg)	So	Ellison High School	St. Matthews, South Carolina
F	19	Andrija Vukovic	6 ft 10 in (2.08 m)	245 lb (111 kg)	Fr	First Sport Basketball College Belgrade	Čukarica, Serbia
F	23	Mikey Kelvin II (5Y)	6 ft 6 in (1.98 m)	200 lb (91 kg)	Sr	Queen's (ON)	Ottawa, Ontario
F	24	Patrick Suemnick	6 ft 8 in (2.03 m)	225 lb (102 kg)	GS	West Virginia	Green Bay, Wisconsin
F	25	Robert Jennings II	6 ft 7 in (2.01 m)	230 lb (104 kg)	Jr	Texas Tech	DeSoto, Texas
F	33	Abou Ousmane (5Y)	6 ft 10 in (2.08 m)	245 lb (111 kg)	Sr	Xavier	Brooklyn, New York
F	34	Tyler Caron	6 ft 8 in (2.03 m)	210 lb (95 kg)	GS	St. Mary's (TX)	Longview, Texas
F	35	Jaxton Bobik	6 ft 7 in (2.01 m)	185 lb (84 kg)	RS Fr	Queen Creek High School	Queen Creek, Arizona
F	55	C.J. Smith	6 ft 7 in (2.01 m)	205 lb (93 kg)	So	Coffeyville Community College	Oklahoma City, Oklahoma

Head coach

- Steve Lutz (Texas Lutheran)

Assistant coach(es)

- James Miller (CSU Pueblo)
- Jeremy Cox (Colorado Mesa)
- Mike Ekanem (Texas Lutheran)
- Robert Guster (Missouri–Rolla)
- Keiton Page (Oklahoma State)

Legend

- (C) Team captain
- (S) Suspended
- (I) Ineligible
- (W) Walk-on
- (5Y) Fifth-year senior
- Injured
- Current redshirt

Roster
Last update: December 6, 2024

== Schedule and results ==
Date time, TV	Rank^{#}	Opponent^{#}	Result	Record	High points	High rebounds	High assists	Site (attendance) city, state
Exhibition
October 26, 2024*; 11:00 a.m.		SMU	W 89–78		24 – Thompson	8 – Ousmane	5 – Brantley	Gallagher-Iba Arena; Stillwater, OK
Non-conference regular season
November 4, 2024*; 8:00 p.m., ESPN+		Green Bay	W 89–76	1–0	22 – Thompson	8 – Ousmane	4 – Brantley	Gallagher-Iba Arena (7,251); Stillwater, OK
November 10, 2024*; 2:00 p.m., ESPN+		St. Thomas	W 80–71	2–0	23 – Avery	9 – Dean	5 – Dean	Gallagher-Iba Arena (5,447); Stillwater, OK
November 14, 2024*; 7:00 p.m., ESPN+		Southern Illinois	W 85–78	3–0	18 – Ousmane	4 – Tied	5 – Dean	Gallagher-Iba Arena (5,804); Stillwater, OK
November 21, 2024*; 1:30 p.m., ESPNU		vs. Florida Atlantic; Charleston Classic First Round	L 78–86	3–1	16 – Brantley	11 – Jennings II	4 – Dean	TD Arena (1,818); Charleston, SC
November 22, 2024*; 1:00 p.m., ESPNU		vs. Miami (FL); Charleston Classic Consolation 2nd Round	W 80–74	4–1	17 – Thompson	5 – Ousmane	3 – Davis	TD Arena (1,936); Charleston, SC
November 24, 2024*; 2:00 p.m., ESPN		vs. Nevada; Charleston Classic 5th Place Game	L 78–90	4–2	15 – Avery	6 – Ousmane	3 – Brantley	TD Arena (2,063); Charleston, SC
December 4, 2024*; 7:00 p.m., ESPN+		at Tulsa	W 76–55	5–2	15 – Thompson	8 – Davis	4 – Tied	Reynolds Center (4,590); Tulsa, OK
December 8, 2024*; 11:00 a.m., FS1		at Seton Hall; Big East–Big 12 Battle	W 85–76	6–2	14 – Tied	4 – Tied	8 – Brantley	Prudential Center (8,791); Newark, NJ
December 14, 2024*; 7:00 p.m., ESPNU		vs. No. 13 Oklahoma; Bedlam Series	L 65–80	6–3	19 – Avery	6 – Avery	3 – Tied	Paycom Center (10,300); Oklahoma City, OK
December 18, 2024*; 7:00 p.m., ESPN+		Tarleton State	W 66–61	7–3	18 – Avery	10 – Avery	3 – Tied	Gallagher-Iba Arena (5,188); Stillwater, OK
December 22, 2024*; 2:00 p.m., ESPN+		Oral Roberts	W 86–74	8–3	19 – Ousmane	7 – Ousmane	3 – Tied	Gallagher-Iba Arena (6,349); Stillwater, OK
Big 12 regular season
December 30, 2024; 7:00 p.m., ESPN+		No. 14 Houston	L 47–60	8–4 (0–1)	12 – Newman	8 – Brantley	4 – Brantley	Gallagher-Iba Arena (7,365); Stillwater, OK
January 4, 2025; 11:00 a.m., CBSSN		at West Virginia	L 50–69	8–5 (0–2)	15 – Avery	11 – Ousmane	2 – Keller	WVU Coliseum (11,753); Morgantown, WV
January 7, 2025; 7:00 p.m., ESPN+		Kansas State	W 79–66	9–5 (1–2)	27 – Ousmane	5 – Ousmane	5 – Brantley	Gallagher-Iba Arena (5,540); Stillwater, OK
January 11, 2025; 6:00 p.m., ESPN+		at Utah	L 62–83	9–6 (1–3)	16 – Thompson	6 – Avery	3 – Tied	Jon M. Huntsman Center (7,922); Salt Lake City, UT
January 14, 2025; 8:00 p.m., ESPN+		at BYU	L 69–85	9–7 (1–4)	15 – Tied	7 – Ousmane	4 – Dean	Marriott Center (16,457); Provo, UT
January 18, 2025; 2:00 p.m., ESPN+		Colorado	W 83–73	10–7 (2–4)	15 – Tied	7 – Avery	3 – Tied	Gallagher-Iba Arena (7,247); Stillwater, OK
January 21, 2025; 8:00 p.m., ESPNU		Arizona	L 78–92	10–8 (2–5)	21 – Tied	6 – Ousmane	6 – Dean	Gallagher-Iba Arena (6,355); Stillwater, OK
January 26, 2025; 2:00 p.m., ESPN+		at Texas Tech	L 54–64	10–9 (2–6)	17 – Thompson	10 – Ousmane	3 – Keller	United Supermarkets Arena (13,794); Lubbock, TX
January 29, 2025; 7:00 p.m., CBSSN		at Kansas State	L 57–85	10–10 (2–7)	22 – Avery	5 – Keller	3 – Tied	Bramlage Coliseum (8,542); Manhattan, KS
February 1, 2025; 2:00 p.m., ESPN+		Utah	W 81–72	11–10 (3–7)	20 – Thompson	8 – Ousmane	7 – Dean	Gallagher-Iba Arena (7,040); Stillwater, OK
February 4, 2025; 7:00 p.m., ESPN+		at No. 5 Houston	L 63–72	11–11 (3–8)	16 – Ousmane	4 – Ousmane	4 – Tied	Fertitta Center (7,035); Houston, TX
February 9, 2025; 1:00 p.m., ESPN+		Arizona State	W 86–73	12–11 (4–8)	14 – Keller	8 – Newman	6 – Dean	Gallagher-Iba Arena (5,639); Stillwater, OK
February 12, 2025; 6:00 p.m., CBSSN		at TCU	L 72–73	12–12 (4–9)	17 – Thompson	7 – Ousmane	5 – Dean	Schollmaier Arena (5,424); Fort Worth, TX
February 15, 2025; 2:00 p.m., ESPN+		No. 12 Texas Tech	L 55–93	12–13 (4–10)	13 – Avery	5 – Avery	2 – Jennings	Gallagher-Iba Arena (7,702); Stillwater, OK
February 19, 2025; 8:00 p.m., ESPNU		UCF	W 104–95	13–13 (5–10)	25 – Thompson	7 – Dean	5 – Brantley	Gallagher-Iba Arena (5,122); Stillwater, OK
February 22, 2025; 3:00 p.m., CBS		at No. 23 Kansas	L 64–96	13–14 (5–11)	21 – Thompson	4 – Tied	3 – Dean	Allen Fieldhouse (15,300); Lawrence, KS
February 25, 2025; 7:00 p.m., ESPN+		No. 9 Iowa State	W 74–68	14–14 (6–11)	25 – Ousmane	7 – Jennings	4 – Tied	Gallagher-Iba Arena (5,903); Stillwater, OK
March 1, 2025; 7:00 p.m., ESPN+		at Baylor	L 61–71	14–15 (6–12)	19 – Thompson	6 – Ousmane	2 – Thompson	Foster Pavilion (7,500); Waco, TX
March 5, 2025; 6:00 p.m., ESPN+		at UCF	L 70–83	14–16 (6–13)	13 – Newman	6 – Dean	7 – Dean	Addition Financial Arena (7,116); Orlando, FL
March 8, 2025; 2:00 p.m., ESPN+		Cincinnati	W 78–67	15–16 (7–13)	24 – Ousmane	8 – Ousmane	8 – Dean	Gallagher-Iba Arena (6,597); Stillwater, OK
Big 12 tournament
March 11, 2025; TBA, ESPN+	(12)	vs. (13) Cincinnati; First round	L 68–87	15–17	12 – Dow	13 – Newman	4 – Dean	T-Mobile Center (6,406); Kansas City, MO
NIT
March 18, 2025*; 8:00 p.m., ESPN2	(4)	Wichita State; First round – Dallas Region	W 89–79	16–17	23 – Thompson	12 – Newman	4 – Brantley	Gallagher-Iba Arena (2,295); Stillwater, OK
March 23, 2025*; 2:00 p.m., ESPN2	(4)	at (1) SMU; Second round – Dallas Region	W 85–83	17–17	24 – Thompson	6 – Dean	6 – Tied	Moody Coliseum (3,106); Dallas, TX
March 25, 2025*; 8:00 p.m., ESPN2	(4)	(2) North Texas; Quarterfinal – Dallas Region	L 59–61	17–18	17 – Tied	7 – Dean	3 – Thompson	Gallagher-Iba Arena (4,089); Stillwater, OK
*Non-conference game. ^{#}Rankings from AP poll. (#) Tournament seedings in parentheses. All times are in Central Time.
