= Coast-to-Coast Challenge =

US LBM Coast-to-Coast Challenge
- Sport: College basketball
- Conference: Pac-12 (2021–23); Big 12 (2021–present); SEC (2024–present)
- Number of teams: 4 (2 Men's and 2 Women's, 2021); 8 (4 Men's and 4 Women's, 2022); 6 (Men's, 2023); 6 (4 Men's and 2 Women's, 2024); 4 (4 Men's, 2025)
- Current stadium: Dickies Arena
- Current location: Fort Worth, TX
- Played: 2021–present
- Last contest: 2025
- Most championships: TCU, Texas, Texas Tech (2; Men's); Texas (2; Women's)
- TV partner(s): ABC (2021); ESPN (2021-22); ESPN2 (2022, 2024-present); ESPNU (2023-2024); ESPN+ (2023, 2025)

Sponsors
- MGM Resorts International (2021); US LBM (2022–present)

Host stadiums
- T-Mobile Arena (2021); American Airlines Center (2022); Dickies Arena (2023–present)

Host locations
- Paradise, Nevada (2021); Dallas, Texas (2022); Fort Worth, Texas (2023–present)

The Coast-to-Coast Challenge (currently known as the US LBM Coast-to-Coast Challenge for sponsorship reasons and formerly known as the Pac-12 Coast-to-Coast Challenge) is an annual set of basketball games played in a neutral stadium. The Challenge was set to launch in 2020, but was postponed a year due to the COVID-19 pandemic.

The Challenge launched as a small-scale spiritual successor to the Big 12/Pac-10 Hardwood Series, which ran from 2007 to 2010. As such, it was originally contested by both men's and women's teams of the Pac-12 and Big 12 conferences, but in 2023 was open to men's basketball teams of all conferences, with the Pac-12 and Big 12 as the main conferences represented. As a result of the 2021–2024 NCAA conference realignment, the Challenge no longer featured Pac-12 teams, and instead became a small-scale spiritual successor to the Big 12/SEC Challenge in 2024. Women's basketball returned in 2024 under the name "USLBM Coast to Coast Challenge featuring the Hoopfest Women’s Basketball Classic".

Every match-up within the Challenge has featured a team from Texas.

== Men's Matchups ==
=== 2021 Matchup ===
| Date | Time | Pac-12 team | Big 12 team | Score | Location | Television | Attendance |
|---|---|---|---|---|---|---|---|
| Dec 19 | 12:00 p.m. | Stanford | #17 Texas | 60–53 | T-Mobile Arena • Paradise, Nevada | ABC | 1600 |
WINNER IS IN BOLD. Game Time in Pacific Time.

=== 2022 Matchups ===
| Date | Time | Pac-12 team | Big 12 team | Score | Location | Television | Attendance |
|---|---|---|---|---|---|---|---|
| Dec 18 | 12:00 p.m. | Stanford | #7 Texas | 72–62 | American Airlines Center • Dallas, Texas | ESPN | 4700 |
| Dec 18 | 9:00 p.m. | Washington State | #11 Baylor | 65–59 | American Airlines Center • Dallas, Texas | ESPN2 | 4200 |
WINNERS ARE IN BOLD. Game Time in Central Time.

=== 2023 Matchups ===
| Date | Time | Pac-12/SEC/MW team | Big 12/WAC team | Score | Location | Television | Attendance |
|---|---|---|---|---|---|---|---|
| Dec 16 | 4:00 p.m. | Air Force | UT Arlington | 76–73 | Dickies Arena • Fort Worth, Texas | ESPN+ | 3,752 |
| Dec 16 | 6:30 p.m. | Vanderbilt | Texas Tech | 76–54 | Dickies Arena • Fort Worth, Texas | ESPN+ | 7,219 |
| Dec 16 | 9:00 p.m. | Arizona State | TCU | 79–59 | Dickies Arena • Fort Worth, Texas | ESPNU | 4,890 |
WINNERS ARE IN BOLD. Game Time in Central Time.

=== 2024 Matchups ===
| Date | Time | SEC team | Big 12 team | Score | Location | Television | Attendance |
|---|---|---|---|---|---|---|---|
| Dec 8 | 11:30 a.m. | Vanderbilt | TCU | 83–74 | Dickies Arena • Fort Worth, Texas | ESPNU | |
| Dec 8 | 2:00 p.m. | #22 Texas A&M | Texas Tech | 72–67 | Dickies Arena • Fort Worth, Texas | ESPN2 | |
WINNERS ARE IN BOLD. Game Time in Central Time.

=== 2025 Matchups ===
| Date | Time | SEC/AAC team | Big 12 team | Score | Location | Television | Attendance |
|---|---|---|---|---|---|---|---|
| Dec 8 | 2:00 p.m. | LSU | #19 Texas Tech | 82–58 | Dickies Arena • Fort Worth, Texas | ESPN2 | |
| Dec 8 | 4:30 p.m. | North Texas | TCU | 65–55 | Dickies Arena • Fort Worth, Texas | ESPN+ | |
WINNERS ARE IN BOLD. Game Time in Central Time.

== Women's Matchups ==
=== 2021 Matchup ===
| Date | Time | Pac-12 team | Big 12 team | Score | Location | Television | Attendance |
|---|---|---|---|---|---|---|---|
| Dec 19 | 2:30 p.m. | San Diego (WCC Team) | #11 Texas | 74–58 | T-Mobile Arena • Paradise, Nevada | ESPN2 | |
WINNER IS IN BOLD. Game Times in Pacific Time.

Originally, Arizona was to be the Pac-12 representative, but backed out due to COVID-19 protocols

=== 2022 Matchups ===
| Date | Time | Pac-12 team | Big 12 team | Score | Location | Television | Attendance |
|---|---|---|---|---|---|---|---|
| Dec 18 | 2:30 p.m. | USC | Texas | 62–48 | American Airlines Center • Dallas, Texas | ESPN2 | 4,700 |
| Dec 18 | 6:30 p.m. | #20 Arizona | #18 Baylor | 75–54 | American Airlines Center • Dallas, Texas | ESPN2 | |
WINNERS ARE IN BOLD. Game Time in Central Time.

=== 2024 Matchup ===
| Date | Time | SEC team | Big 12 team | Score | Location | Television | Attendance |
|---|---|---|---|---|---|---|---|
| Dec 8 | 6:00 p.m. | #3 South Carolina | #9 TCU | 85–52 | Dickies Arena • Fort Worth, Texas | ESPN2 | 8,004 |
WINNERS ARE IN BOLD. Game Time in Central Time.
