= 2024–25 Baylor Bears men's basketball team =

American college basketball season

2024–25 Baylor Bears men's basketball

NCAA tournament, Second Round
- Conference: Big 12 Conference
- Record: 20–15 (10–10 Big 12)
- Head coach: Scott Drew (22nd season)
- Assistant coaches: Tweety Carter (1st season); Steve Henson (1st season); Jared Nuness (3rd season); Bill Armstrong (1st season); Melvin Hunt (1st season)
- Offensive scheme: Motion
- Base defense: No-Middle
- Home arena: Foster Pavilion

2024–25 Big 12 men's basketball standings
	Conf.				Overall
Team	W		L	PCT	W		L	PCT
No. 2 Houston †	19	–	1	.950	35	–	5	.875
No. 8 Texas Tech	15	–	5	.750	28	–	9	.757
No. 15 Arizona	14	–	6	.700	24	–	13	.649
No. 13 BYU	14	–	6	.700	26	–	10	.722
No. 17 Iowa State	13	–	7	.650	25	–	10	.714
Kansas	11	–	9	.550	21	–	13	.618
Baylor	10	–	10	.500	20	–	15	.571
West Virginia	10	–	10	.500	19	–	13	.594
TCU	9	–	11	.450	16	–	16	.500
Kansas State	9	–	11	.450	16	–	17	.485
Utah	8	–	12	.400	16	–	17	.485
Oklahoma State	7	–	13	.350	17	–	18	.486
Cincinnati	7	–	13	.350	19	–	16	.543
UCF	7	–	13	.350	20	–	17	.541
Arizona State	4	–	16	.200	13	–	20	.394
Colorado	3	–	17	.150	14	–	21	.400
† 2025 Big 12 tournament winner Rankings from AP poll

The 2024–25 Baylor Bears men's basketball team represented Baylor University during the 2024–25 NCAA Division I men's basketball season, the Bears' 119th season. The Bears, members of the Big 12 Conference, played their home games at Foster Pavilion. They were led by 22nd-year head coach Scott Drew.

== Previous season ==
The Bears finished the 2023–24 season 24–11, 11–7 in Big 12 play to finish in a tie for third place. They lost in the semifinals of the Big 12 tournament to Iowa State. They received an at-large bid to the NCAA tournament as the number three seed in the West Region, where they defeated Colgate in the first round before losing in the second round to Clemson.

== Offseason ==
=== Departures ===
Baylor Departures
Name	Number	Pos.	Height	Weight	Year	Hometown	Reason for Departure
Miro Little	1	G	6'4"	185	Freshman	Tampere, Finland	Transferred to Utah
Ja'Kobe Walter	4	F	6'5"	180	Freshman	McKinney, TX	Declare for 2024 NBA draft; selected 19th overall by Toronto Raptors
RayJ Dennis	10	G	6'2"	180	Senior	Plainfield, IL	Graduated/undrafted in 2024 NBA draft; signed with the Los Angeles Clippers
Jalen Bridges	11	F	6'7"	225	(redshirt) Senior	Fairmont, WV	Graduated/undrafted in 2024 NBA draft; signed with the Phoenix Suns
Dantwan Grimes	12	G	6'2"	190	(redshirt) Junior	Ocala, FL	Transferred to Tarleton State
Austin Sacks	20	F	6'7"	200	Senior	Encino, CA	Graduated
Yves Missi	21	F	6'10"	210	Freshman	Yaoundé, Cameroon	Declare for 2024 NBA draft; selected 21st overall by New Orleans Pelicans
Jonathan Tchamwa Tchatchoua	23	F	6'8"	250	Graduate	Douala, Cameroon	Graduated
Caleb Lohner	33	F	6'8"	235	Senior	Dallas, TX	Transferred to Utah

=== Incoming transfers ===
Incoming transfers
Name	Number	Pos.	Height	Weight	Year	Hometown	Previous School
Jeremy Roach	3	G	6'2"	180	Fifth Year	Leesburg, VA	Duke
Norchad Omier	15	F	6'7"	248	Fifth Year	Bluefields, Nicaragua	Miami (FL)
Jalen Celestine	32	G	6'7"	215	Graduate	Ajax, Ontario	California
Yanis Ndjonga	41	F	6'7"	210	Senior	Yaoundé, Cameroon	New Mexico Military Institute

=== Recruiting classes ===
==== 2024 recruiting class ====
College recruiting information
Name	Hometown	School	Height	Weight	Commit date
V. J. Edgecombe #1 SG	Glen Head, NY	Long Island Lutheran HS	6 ft 5 in (1.96 m)	180 lb (82 kg)	Jan 14, 2024
V. J. Edgecombe #1 SG	Recruit ratings: Scout: Rivals: 247Sports: ESPN: (96)				
Robert Wright III #1 PG	Wilimgton, DE	Montverde Academy	5 ft 11 in (1.80 m)	175 lb (79 kg)	Sep 9, 2022
Robert Wright III #1 PG	Recruit ratings: Scout: Rivals: 247Sports: ESPN: (89)				
Jason Asemota #16 SF	Phoenix, AZ	Hillcrest Prep	6 ft 9 in (2.06 m)	210 lb (95 kg)	Aug 27, 2022
Jason Asemota #16 SF	Recruit ratings: Scout: Rivals: 247Sports: ESPN: (87)				
Overall recruit ranking: Rivals: 4 247Sports: 4
Note: In many cases, Scout, Rivals, 247Sports, On3, and ESPN may conflict in their listings of height and weight.; In these cases, the average was taken. ESPN grades are on a 100-point scale.; Sources: "Baylor 2024 Basketball Commitments". Rivals.; "2024 Baylor Bears Recruiting Class". ESPN.; "2024 Team Ranking". Rivals.

== Preseason ==
Big 12 Preseason Poll

	Big 12 Coaches	Points
1.	Kansas	215 (9)
2.	Houston	211 (5)
3.	Iowa State	194 (1)
4.	Baylor	185
5.	Arizona	179 (1)
6.	Cincinnati	140
7.	Texas Tech	135
8.	Kansas State	133
9.	BYU	116
10.	TCU	90
11.	UCF	83
12.	Arizona State	64
13.	West Virginia	62
14.	Oklahoma State	46
15.	Colorado	37
16.	Utah	30
Reference: (#) first-place votes

Pre-Season All-Big 12 Team

First Team

Player	School
Caleb Love	Arizona
LJ Cryer	Houston
J’Wan Roberts	Houston
Tamin Lipsey	Iowa State
Hunter Dickinson†	Kansas
† denotes unanimous selection Reference:

Second Team

Player	School
Norchad Omier	Baylor
Jeremy Roach	Baylor
Keshon Gilbert	Iowa State
Dajuan Harris Jr	Kansas
Coleman Hawkins	Kansas State
† denotes unanimous selection Reference:

- Player of the Year: Hunter Dickinson, Kansas
- Co-Newcomer of the Year: Jeremy Roach, Baylor & Coleman Hawkins, Kansas State
- Freshman of the Year: V. J. Edgecombe, Baylor

== Roster ==
2024–25 Baylor Bears men's basketball team
Players
Coaches

Pos.	#	Name	Height	Weight	Year	Previous school	Hometown
G	1	Robert Wright III	6 ft 1 in (1.85 m)	183 lb (83 kg)	Fr	Montverde Academy	Wilmington, Delaware
G	2	Jayden Nunn	6 ft 4 in (1.93 m)	190 lb (86 kg)	Sr	VCU	Flint, Michigan
G	3	Jeremy Roach (5Y)	6 ft 2 in (1.88 m)	180 lb (82 kg)	Sr	Duke	Leesburg, Virginia
F	5	Jason Asemota	6 ft 8 in (2.03 m)	200 lb (91 kg)	Fr	Hillcrest Prep	Lynn, Massachusetts
G	7	V. J. Edgecombe	6 ft 5 in (1.96 m)	180 lb (82 kg)	Fr	Long Island Lutheran High School	Bimini, Bahamas
G	11	Kaleb Jackson (W)	6 ft 2 in (1.88 m)	175 lb (79 kg)	Fr	Carmel Catholic High School	Lake Forest, Illinois
G	13	Langston Love	6 ft 5 in (1.96 m)	210 lb (95 kg)	RS Jr	Montverde Academy	Universal City, Texas
F	15	Norchad Omier (5Y)	6 ft 7 in (2.01 m)	248 lb (112 kg)	Sr	Miami (FL)	Bluefields, Nicaragua
F	17	Josh Ojianwuna	6 ft 10 in (2.08 m)	230 lb (104 kg)	Jr	NBA Global Academy	Asaba, Nigeria
G	21	Davidson Hubbard	6 ft 5 in (1.96 m)	215 lb (98 kg)	GS	Hampden–Sydney	Charlotte, North Carolina
F	22	Marino Dubravcic (W)	6 ft 10 in (2.08 m)	228 lb (103 kg)	Fr	Obrtna tehnicka	Split, Croatia
G	25	Omar Adegbola (W)	6 ft 4 in (1.93 m)	205 lb (93 kg)	RS Fr	Montverde Academy	Houston, Texas
G	32	Jalen Celestine	6 ft 7 in (2.01 m)	215 lb (98 kg)	GS	California	Ajax, Ontario
F	41	Yanis Ndjonga	6 ft 7 in (2.01 m)	210 lb (95 kg)	RS So	New Mexico Military Institute	Yaoundé, Cameroon

Head coach

- Scott Drew (Butler)

Assistant coach(es)

- Tweety Carter (Baylor)
- Steve Henson (Kansas State)
- Jared Nuness (Valparaiso)
- Bill Armstrong (UAB)
- Melvin Hunt (Baylor)

Legend

- (C) Team captain
- (S) Suspended
- (I) Ineligible
- (W) Walk-on
- Injured
- Current redshirt

Roster
Last update: December 7, 2024

== Schedule and results ==
Date time, TV	Rank^{#}	Opponent^{#}	Result	Record	High points	High rebounds	High assists	Site (attendance) city, state
Non-conference regular season
November 4, 2024*; 10:30 p.m., ESPN2	No. 8	at No. 6 Gonzaga; Findlay Auto Tip-Off	L 63–101	0–1	15 – Omier	9 – Omier	7 – Wright	Spokane Arena (12,000); Spokane, WA
November 9, 2024*; 6:30 p.m., ESPNU	No. 8	vs. No. 16 Arkansas	W 72–67	1–1	16 – Nunn	12 – Omier	5 – Edgecombe	American Airlines Center (10,207); Dallas, Texas
November 12, 2024*; 7:00 p.m., ESPN+	No. 12	Sam Houston	W 104–67	2–1	19 – Nunn	10 – Tied	8 – Roach	Foster Pavilion (7,500); Waco, TX
November 17, 2024*; 7:00 p.m., ESPN+	No. 12	Tarleton State	W 104–41	3–1	20 – Celestine	9 – Omier	9 – Wright III	Foster Pavilion (7,500); Waco, TX
November 21, 2024*; 6:00 p.m., CBSSN	No. 13	vs. No. 22 St. John's; Bahamas Championship semifinals	W 99–98 ^{2OT}	4–1	24 – Omier	10 – Omier	4 – Tied	Baha Mar Convention Center (2,077); Nassau, Bahamas
November 22, 2024*; 9:30 p.m., CBSSN	No. 13	vs. No. 11 Tennessee; Bahamas Championship final	L 62–77	4–2	22 – Omier	10 – Omier	3 – Tied	Baha Mar Convention Center (2,119); Nassau, Bahamas
November 27, 2024*; 1:00 p.m., ESPN+	No. 17	New Orleans	W 91–60	5–2	23 – Nunn	13 – Omier	8 – Roach	Foster Pavilion (7,500); Waco, TX
December 4, 2024*; 5:30 p.m., FS1	No. 15	at No. 25 UConn; Big East–Big 12 Battle	L 72–76	5–3	22 – Wright	14 – Ojianwuna	4 – Wright III	Gampel Pavilion (10,299); Storrs, CT
December 9, 2024*; 7:00 p.m., CBSSN		Abilene Christian	W 88–57	6–3	18 – Nunn	8 – Ojianwuna	4 – Tied	Foster Pavilion (7,500); Waco, TX
December 11, 2024*; 11:00 a.m., ESPN+		Norfolk State	W 94–69	7–3	19 – Omier	9 – Edgecombe	13 – Wright III	Foster Pavilion (7,500); Waco, TX
December 27, 2024*; 6:00 p.m., ESPN+	No. 25	Arlington Baptist	W 107–53	8–3	19 – Omier	24 – Omier	Wright III – 9	Foster Pavilion (7,500); Waco, TX
Big 12 regular season
December 31, 2024; 1:00 p.m., ESPN+	No. 25	Utah	W 81–56	9–3 (1–0)	19 – Edgecombe	14 – Omier	5 – Nunn	Foster Pavilion (7,500); Waco, TX
January 4, 2025; 1:00 p.m., CBS	No. 25	at No. 3 Iowa State	L 55–74	9–4 (1–1)	16 – Roach	10 – Tied	4 – Edgecombe	Hilton Coliseum (14,267); Ames, IA
January 7, 2025; 7:00 p.m., ESPN+		Cincinnati	W 68–48	10–4 (2–1)	18 – Tied	9 – Omier	4 – Roach	Foster Pavilion (7,500); Waco, TX
January 11, 2025; 8:30 p.m., ESPN+		at Arizona State	W 72–66 ^{OT}	11–4 (3–1)	19 – Omier	17 – Ojianwuna	3 – Tied	Desert Financial Arena (9,449); Tempe, AZ
January 14, 2025; 10:00 p.m., ESPN	No. 25	at Arizona	L 70–81	11–5 (3–2)	16 – Wright	7 – Edgecombe	4 – Wright	McKale Center (14,034); Tucson, AZ
January 19, 2025; 4:00 p.m., ESPN	No. 25	TCU	L 71–74	11–6 (3–3)	20 – Omier	5 – Omier	8 – Wright	Foster Pavilion (7,500); Waco, TX
January 22, 2025; 8:00 p.m., ESPNU		Kansas State	W 70–62	12–6 (4–3)	30 – Edgecombe	13 – Omier	5 – Wright	Foster Pavilion (7,500); Waco, TX
January 25, 2025; 3:30 p.m., ESPN2		at Utah	W 76–61	13–6 (5–3)	22 – Omier	12 – Omier	4 – Edgecombe	Jon M. Huntsman Center (8,311); Salt Lake City, UT
January 28, 2025; 8:00 p.m., ESPN2		at BYU	L 89–93 ^{OT}	13–7 (5–4)	28 – Edgecombe	8 – Oimer	6 – Wright	Marriott Center (17,297); Provo, UT
February 1, 2025; 3:00 p.m., ESPN		No. 11 Kansas	W 81–70	14–7 (6–4)	24 – Wright	16 – Omier	6 – Wright	Foster Pavilion (7,500); Waco, TX
February 4, 2025; 8:00 p.m., ESPN2		at No. 13 Texas Tech	L 59–73	14–8 (6–5)	16 – Omier	12 – Omier	3 – Wright	United Supermarkets Arena (15,098); Lubbock, TX
February 8, 2025; 1:00 p.m., ESPN+		UCF	W 91–76	15–8 (7–5)	18 – Omier	12 – Omier	5 – Edgecombe	Foster Pavilion (7,500); Waco, TX
February 10, 2025; 8:00 p.m., ESPN		at No. 6 Houston	L 65–76	15–9 (7–6)	19 – Omier	6 – Edgecombe	3 – Tied	Fertitta Center (7,035); Houston, TX
February 15, 2025; 1:00 p.m., ESPN2		West Virginia	W 74–71 ^{OT}	16–9 (8–6)	17 – Tied	10 – Omier	6 – Edgecombe	Foster Pavilion (7,500); Waco, TX
February 17, 2025; 9:00 p.m., ESPN		No. 19 Arizona	L 67–74	16–10 (8–7)	24 – Edgecombe	13 – Omier	4 – Wright	Foster Pavilion (7,500); Waco, TX
February 22, 2025; 3:00 p.m., ESPN+		at Colorado	L 74–76	16–11 (8–8)	18 – Omier	13 – Omier	7 – Edgecombe	CU Events Center (7,341); Boulder, CO
February 25, 2025; 6:00 p.m., ESPN+		at Cincinnati	L 67–69	16–12 (8–9)	18 – Edgecombe	10 – Omier	4 – Wright	Fifth Third Arena (10,598); Cincinnati, OH
March 1, 2025; 7:00 p.m., ESPN+		Oklahoma State	W 71–61	17–12 (9–9)	16 – Wright	13 – Omier	3 – Roach	Foster Pavilion (7,500); Waco, TX
March 4, 2025; 7:00 p.m., ESPN+		at TCU	W 61–58	18–12 (10–9)	19 – Omier	12 – Omier	7 – Wright	Schollmaier Arena (6,621); Fort Worth, TX
March 8, 2025; 9:00 p.m., ESPN		No. 3 Houston	L 61–65	18–13 (10–10)	23 – Edgecombe	16 – Omier	5 – Nunn	Foster Pavilion (7,500); Waco, TX
Big 12 tournament
March 12, 2025; 6:00 p.m., ESPN+	(7)	vs. (10) Kansas State; Second Round	W 70–56	19–13	19 – Edgecombe	14 – Omier	5 – Roach	T-Mobile Center (15,431); Kansas City, MO
March 13, 2025; 6:00 p.m., ESPN	(7)	vs. (2) No. 9 Texas Tech; Quarterfinals	L 74–76	19–14	29 – Omier	15 – Omier	5 – Edgecombe	T-Mobile Center; Kansas City, MO
NCAA tournament
March 21, 2025*; 11:15 a.m., CBS	(9 E)	vs. (8 E) Mississippi State; First Round	W 75–72	20–14	19 – Wright	9 – Omier	2 – Tied	Lenovo Center (19,180); Raleigh, NC
March 23, 2025*; 1:40 p.m., CBS	(9 E)	vs. (1 E) No. 1 Duke; Second Round	L 66–89	20–15	16 – Edgecombe	9 – Omier	3 – Wright	Lenovo Center (19,244); Raleigh, NC
*Non-conference game. ^{#}Rankings from AP poll. (#) Tournament seedings in parentheses. E=East. All times are in Central Time.

== Rankings ==
Ranking movements Legend: ██ Increase in ranking ██ Decrease in ranking — = Not ranked RV = Received votes
	Week																				
Poll	Pre	1	2	3	4	5	6	7	8	9	10	11	12	13	14	15	16	17	18	19	Final
AP	8	12	13	17	15	RV	RV	25	25	RV	25	RV	RV	RV	—	—	—	—	—	—	—
Coaches	8	14	15	18	16	25	RV	23	21	RV	24	RV	RV	RV	RV	—	—	—	—	—	RV
