= Big East–Big 12 Battle =

American college basketball conference challenge

- Conference: Big East Conference; Big 12 Conference
- League: NCAA Division I
- Founded: 2019
- Folded: 2024
- Sports fielded: College basketball
- Most titles: Big 12 Conference (2)
- Broadcasters: ESPN, ESPN2, ESPNU, ESPN+, ABC, Fox, and FS1

The Big East–Big 12 Battle was an annual NCAA Division I men's college basketball series in which teams from the Big East Conference faced teams of the Big 12 Conference. The series was played from 2019 to 2024. The Big East–Big 12 Battle originally was planned as a four-season competition to be played annually from 2019 through 2022, but on August 1, 2022, the two conferences announced a two-year extension of the series, with games also to be played in 2023 and 2024. On April 10, 2024, Jon Rothstein of College Hoops Today reported that the Big East-Big 12 Battle would not continue past the 2024–25 season.

In 2019, when the Big East consisted of 10 teams, all 10 Big East teams faced one of the 10 Big 12 teams. The Big East expanded to 11 teams when UConn moved from the American Athletic Conference to the Big East for the 2020–2021 season, so from 2020 through 2022 ten of the eleven Big East teams faced one of the Big 12 teams and one Big East team did not participate, although four games scheduled for the 2020 series were canceled due to the COVID-19 pandemic. The Big 12 added four new schools to the conference in 2023, allowing all 11 Big East teams to participate each season, while three of the 14 Big 12 teams did not. With the Big 12 expanding to 16 teams in 2024, five of its teams sat out the final year of the challenge.

In the 10-game format used from 2019 to 2022, each conference hosted five games each season. In the 11-game format for 2023 and 2024, the Big 12 hosted six games in 2023 and the Big East hosted six in 2024.

The teams in the Big East-Big 12 Battle did not face each other all on the same day. Instead, they played each other over the span of as much as two and a half weeks, with games scheduled in late November and December in some years and solely in December in others. The Big East won the first series 8–2 in 2019, the next three series ended in a tie between the two conferences, and the Big 12 won the 2023 series 7–4 and the 2024 series 6–5. Overall, the Big East won 30 games and the Big 12 won 28.

Big 12 home games aired on ESPN, ESPN2, ESPNU, ESPN+, and ABC, while Big East home games aired on Fox and Fox Sports 1.

== Conference and team records ==
=== Big East Conference (1–2–3) ===
Team	Wins	Losses	DNP	Win %	Total Attendance
Butler Bulldogs	3	2	1	.600	15,553
Creighton Bluejays	3	3	0	.500	53,348
DePaul Blue Demons	1	2	3	.333	15,239
Georgetown Hoyas	1	5	0	.167	7,910
Marquette Golden Eagles	4	2	0	.667	30,755
Providence Friars	4	2	0	.667	31,901
Seton Hall Pirates	1	4	1	.200	19,272
St. John's Red Storm	3	2	1	.600	22,652
UConn Huskies	2	2	1	.500	20,466
Villanova Wildcats	4	2	0	.667	23,580
Xavier Musketeers	4	2	0	.667	20,932
Overall	30	28	7	.517	273,130

NOTE: UConn moved from the American Athletic Conference to the Big East Conference in 2020.

=== Big 12 Conference (2–1–3) ===
Team	Wins	Losses	DNP	Win %	Total Attendance
Arizona Wildcats	0	0	1	–	–
Arizona State Sun Devils	0	0	1	–	–
Baylor Bears	3	2	1	.600	25,803
BYU Cougars	0	1	1	.000	0
Cincinnati Bearcats	0	1	1	.000	0
Colorado Buffaloes	0	0	1	–	–
Houston Cougars	2	0	0	1.000	17,507
Iowa State Cyclones	5	0	1	1.000	41,913
Kansas Jayhawks	4	2	0	.667	35,100
Kansas State Wildcats	1	4	1	.200	27,397
Oklahoma Sooners	1	4	0	.200	15,888
Oklahoma State Cowboys	2	4	0	.333	33,531
TCU Horned Frogs	4	2	0	.600	18,814
Texas Longhorns	1	4	0	.200	13,269
Texas Tech Red Raiders	2	3	1	.400	26,114
West Virginia Mountaineers	3	3	0	.500	34,348
UCF Knights	0	0	2	–	–
Utah Utes	0	0	1	–	–
Overall	28	30	12	.483	289,684

NOTES: In 2023, Cincinnati, Houston, and UCF moved from the American Athletic Conference to the Big 12 Conference and BYU moved from the West Coast Conference to the Big 12. In 2024, Arizona and Arizona State moved from the Pac-12 Conference to the Big 12 and Oklahoma and Texas moved from the Big 12 to the Southeastern Conference.

== Results ==
=== 2019 Big East (8–2) ===
Date	Time	Big East team	Big 12 team	Score	Location	Television	Attendance	Leader
Wed., Dec. 4	7:30 PM	DePaul	Texas Tech	65–60 ^{OT}	Wintrust Arena • Chicago, Illinois	FS1	10,387	Big East (1–0)
Wed., Dec. 4	8:00 PM	Georgetown	Oklahoma State	81–74	Gallagher-Iba Arena • Stillwater, Oklahoma	ESPN+	13,611	Big East (2–0)
Sat., Dec. 7	12:00 PM	St. John's	West Virginia	70–68	Madison Square Garden • New York, NY	FS1	7,281	Big East (3–0)
Sat., Dec. 7	8:00 PM	Marquette	Kansas State	65–73	Bramlage Coliseum • Manhattan, Kansas	ESPN2	10,073	Big East (4–0)
Sun., Dec. 8	9:00 PM	No. 16 Seton Hall	Iowa State	76–66	Hilton Coliseum • Ames, Iowa	ESPN2	14,269	Big East (4–1)
Tue., Dec. 10	9:00 PM	No. 17 Butler	No. 11 Baylor	52–53	Ferrell Center • Waco, Texas	ESPN2	7,270	Big East (4–2)
Tue., Dec. 17	7:30 PM	Creighton	Oklahoma	83–73	CHI Health Center Omaha • Omaha, Nebraska	FS1	17,146	Big East (5–2)
Sat., Dec. 21	7:30 PM	No. 18 Villanova	No. 1 Kansas	56–55	Wells Fargo Center • Philadelphia, Pennsylvania	FOX	20,706	Big East (6–2)
Sat., Dec. 21	2:00 PM	Providence	Texas	70–48	Dunkin Donuts Center • Providence, Rhode Island	FOX	9,876	Big East (7–2)
Sun., Dec. 22	5:00 PM	Xavier	TCU	59–67	Schollmaier Arena • Fort Worth, Texas	ESPN2	6,445	Big East (8–2)
WINNERS ARE IN BOLD. HOME TEAM IN ITALICS. All times Eastern. Rankings from AP Poll released prior to the game.

=== 2020 Tied (3–3) ===
Date	Time	Big East team	Big 12 team	Score	Location	Television	Attendance	Leader
Sun., Nov. 29	4:30 PM	Seton Hall	No. 2 Baylor	Canceled due to COVID-19 pandemic				
Tue., Dec. 1	7:00 PM	Marquette	Oklahoma State	70–62	Fiserv Forum • Milwaukee, WI	FS1	0	Big 12 (1–0)
Thu., Dec. 3	9:00 PM	St. John's	No. 17 Texas Tech	Canceled due to COVID-19 pandemic				
Sun., Dec. 6	1:00 pm	No. 12 Villanova	No. 17 Texas	68–64	Frank Erwin Center • Austin, TX	ESPN	2,506	Tie (1–1)
Sun., Dec. 6	4:30 PM	Georgetown	No. 11 West Virginia	80–71	McDonough Gymnasium • Washington, DC	FS1	0	Big 12 (2–1)
Sun., Dec. 6	5:00 PM	DePaul	Iowa State	Canceled due to COVID-19 pandemic				
Tue., Dec. 8	4:00 PM	No. 8 Creighton	No. 5 Kansas	73–72	Allen Fieldhouse • Lawrence, KS	ESPN	2,500	Big 12 (3–1)
Wed., Dec. 9	5:00 PM	Providence	TCU	79–70	Schollmaier Arena • Fort Worth, TX	ESPNU	1,620	Big 12 (3–2)
Wed., Dec. 9	8:00 PM	Xavier	Oklahoma	99–77	Cintas Center • Cincinnati, OH	FS1	300	Tie (3–3)
Fri., Dec. 11	3:00 PM	Butler	Kansas State	Canceled due to COVID-19 pandemic				
WINNERS ARE IN BOLD. HOME TEAM IN ITALICS; All times Eastern. Rankings from AP Poll released prior to the game. Did not participate: UConn. At all games, fan and press attendance was either limited or prohibited entirely by local health restrictions during the COVID-19 pandemic.

=== 2021 Tied (5–5) ===
Date	Time	Big East team	Big 12 team	Score	Location	Television	Attendance	Leader
Wed., Dec. 1	8:30 PM	Providence	Texas Tech	72–68	Dunkin Donuts Center • Providence, Rhode Island	FS1	10,020	Big East (1–0)
Fri., Dec. 3	7:00 PM	St. John's	No. 8 Kansas	95–75	UBS Arena • Elmont, New York	FS1	9,769	Tie (1–1)
Sat., Dec. 4	9:00 PM	Creighton	No. 19 Iowa State	64–58	CHI Health Center Omaha • Omaha, Nebraska	FS1	18,294	Big 12 (2–1)
Sun., Dec. 5	5:00 PM	Xavier	Oklahoma State	77–71	Gallagher-Iba Arena • Stillwater, Oklahoma	ESPN2	13,611	Tie (2–2)
Tue., Dec. 7	9:00 PM	Butler	Oklahoma	66–62	Lloyd Noble Center • Norman, Oklahoma	ESPN2	8,654	Big East (3–2)
Wed., Dec. 8	7:00 PM	No. 15 UConn	West Virginia	56–53	WVU Coliseum • Morgantown, West Virginia	ESPN2	12,045	Tie (3–3)
Wed., Dec. 8	9:00 PM	Marquette	Kansas State	64–63	Bramlage Coliseum • Manhattan, Kansas	ESPN2	7,184	Big East (4–3)
Thu., Dec. 9	6:30 PM	No. 23 Seton Hall	No. 7 Texas	64–60	Prudential Center • Newark, New Jersey	FS1	10,481	Big East (5–3)
Sun., Dec. 12	3:00 PM	No. 6 Villanova	No. 2 Baylor	57–36	Ferrell Center • Waco, Texas	ABC	10,264	Big East (5–4)
Sat., Dec. 18	2:10 PM	Georgetown	TCU	80–73	Capital One Arena • Washington, D.C.	FS1	5,053	Tie (5–5)
WINNERS ARE IN BOLD. HOME TEAM IN ITALICS. All times Eastern. Rankings from AP Poll released prior to the game. Did not participate: DePaul

=== 2022 Tied (5–5) ===
Date	Time	Big East team	Big 12 team	Score	Location	Television	Attendance	Leader
Tue., Nov. 29	8:30 PM	Marquette	No. 6 Baylor	96–70	Fiserv Forum • Milwaukee, WI	FS1	14,022	Big East (1–0)
Wed., Nov. 30	6:30 PM	Butler	Kansas State	76–64	Hinkle Fieldhouse • Indianapolis, IN	FS1	7,660	Big East (2–0)
Wed., Nov. 30	8:00 PM	Providence	TCU	75–62	Schollmaier Arena • Fort Worth, TX	ESPN+	5,593	Big East (2–1)
Wed., Nov. 30	8:00 PM	Georgetown	Texas Tech	79–65	United Supermarkets Arena • Lubbock, TX	ESPN+	14,649	Tie (2–2)
Thu., Dec. 1	6:30 PM	No. 8 UConn	Oklahoma State	74–64	Harry A. Gampel Pavilion • Storrs, CT	FS1	10,167	Big East (3–2)
Thu., Dec. 1	7:00 PM	No. 7 Creighton	No. 2 Texas	72–67	Moody Center • Austin, TX	ESPN	10,763	Tie (3–3)
Thu., Dec. 1	9:00 PM	Seton Hall	No. 9 Kansas	91–65	Allen Fieldhouse • Lawrence, KS	ESPN	16,300	Big 12 (4–3)
Sat., Dec. 3	12:30 PM	Villanova	Oklahoma	70–66	Wells Fargo Center • Philadelphia, PA	CBS	17,079	Tie (4–4)
Sat., Dec. 3	6:30 PM	Xavier	West Virginia	84–74	Cintas Center • Cincinnati, Ohio	FS1	10,460	Big East (5–4)
Sun., Dec. 4	3:00 PM	St. John's	No. 23 Iowa State	71–60	Hilton Coliseum • Ames, Iowa	ESPN2	13,377	Tie (5–5)
WINNERS ARE IN BOLD. HOME TEAM IN ITALICS. All times Eastern. Rankings from AP Poll released prior to the game. Did not participate: DePaul

=== 2023 Big 12 (7–4) ===
Date	Time	Big East team	Big 12 team	Score	Location	Television	Attendance	Leader
Thu., Nov. 30	6:30 PM	Butler	Texas Tech	103–95^{OT}	Hinkle Fieldhouse • Indianapolis, IN	FS1	7,893	Big East (1–0)
Thu., Nov. 30	9:00 PM	No. 15 Creighton	Oklahoma State	79–65	Gallagher-Iba Arena • Stillwater, Oklahoma	ESPN2	6,309	Big East (2–0)
Fri., Dec. 1	6:30 PM	Xavier	No. 6 Houston	66–60	Cintas Center • Cincinnati, Ohio	FS1	10,472	Big East (2–1)
Fri., Dec. 1	7:00 PM	St. John's	West Virginia	79–73	WVU Coliseum • Morgantown, West Virginia	ESPN2	10,781	Big East (3–1)
Fri., Dec. 1	8:30 PM	DePaul	Iowa State	99–80	Wintrust Arena • Chicago	FS1	4,852	Big East (3–2)
Fri., Dec. 1	9:00 PM	No. 4 UConn	No. 5 Kansas	69–65	Allen Fieldhouse • Lawrence, KS	ESPN2	16,300	Tie (3–3)
Sat., Dec. 2	5:37 PM	Georgetown	TCU	84–83	Capital One Arena • Washington, D.C.	FS1	7,910	Big 12 (4–3)
Tue., Dec. 5	7:00 PM	Providence	No. 19 Oklahoma	72–51	Lloyd Noble Center • Norman, Oklahoma	ESPNU	7,234	Big 12 (5–3)
Tue., Dec. 5	7:00 PM	Villanova	Kansas State	72–71^{OT}	Bramlage Coliseum • Manhattan, Kansas	ESPN2	10,140	Big 12 (6–3)
Tue., Dec. 5	9:00 PM	Seton Hall	No. 6 Baylor	78–60	Ferrell Center • Waco, Texas	ESPN2	8,269	Big 12 (7–3)
Wed, Dec. 6	7:00 PM	No. 8 Marquette	No. 12 Texas	86–65	Fiserv Forum • Milwaukee, WI	FS1	16,733	Big 12 (7–4)
WINNERS ARE IN BOLD. HOME TEAM IN ITALICS. All times Eastern. Rankings from AP Poll released prior to the game. Did not participate: BYU, Cincinnati, UCF

=== 2024 Big 12 (6–5) ===
Date	Time	Big East team	Big 12 team	Score	Location	Television	Attendance	Leader
Tue., Dec. 3	6:30 PM	Villanova	No. 14 Cincinnati	68–60	Finneran Pavilion • Villanova, PA	FS1	6,501	Big East (1–0)
Tue., Dec. 3	8:30 PM	Providence	BYU	83–64	Amica Mutual Pavilion • Providence, RI	FS1	12,005	Big East (2–0)
Wed., Dec. 4	6:30 PM	No. 25 UConn	No. 15 Baylor	76–72	Gampel Pavilion • Storrs, CT	FS1	10,299	Big East (3–0)
Wed., Dec. 4	7:00 PM	No. 5 Marquette	No. 6 Iowa State	81–70	Hilton Coliseum • Ames, IA	ESPN+	14,267	Big East (3–1)
Wed., Dec. 4	8:30 PM	Creighton	No. 1 Kansas	76–63	CHI Health Center Omaha • Omaha, NE	FS1	17,908	Big East (4–1)
Wed., Dec. 4	9:00 PM	DePaul	Texas Tech	76–62	United Supermarkets Arena • Lubbock, TX	ESPNU	11,465	Big East (4–2)
Thu., Dec. 5	8:00 PM	Xavier	TCU	76–72	Schollmaier Arena • Fort Worth, TX	ESPN+	5,156	Big East (4–3)
Fri., Dec. 6	7:00 PM	Georgetown	West Virginia	73–60	WVU Coliseum • Morgantown, WV	ESPN2	11,522	Tied (4–4)
Sat., Dec. 7	11:30 AM	St. John's	Kansas State	88–71	Carnesecca Arena • Jamaica, NY	Fox	5,602	Big East (5–4)
Sat., Dec. 7	5:30 PM	Butler	No. 17 Houston	79–51	Fertitta Center • Houston, TX	ESPN2	7,035	Tied (5–5)
Sun., Dec. 8	12:00 PM	Seton Hall	Oklahoma State	85–76	Prudential Center • Newark, NJ	FS1	8,791	Big 12 (6–5)
WINNERS ARE IN BOLD. HOME TEAM IN ITALICS. All times Eastern. Rankings from AP Poll released prior to the game. Did not participate: Arizona, Arizona State, Colorado, UCF, Utah
