= V. J. Edgecombe =

Bahamian basketball player (born 2005)

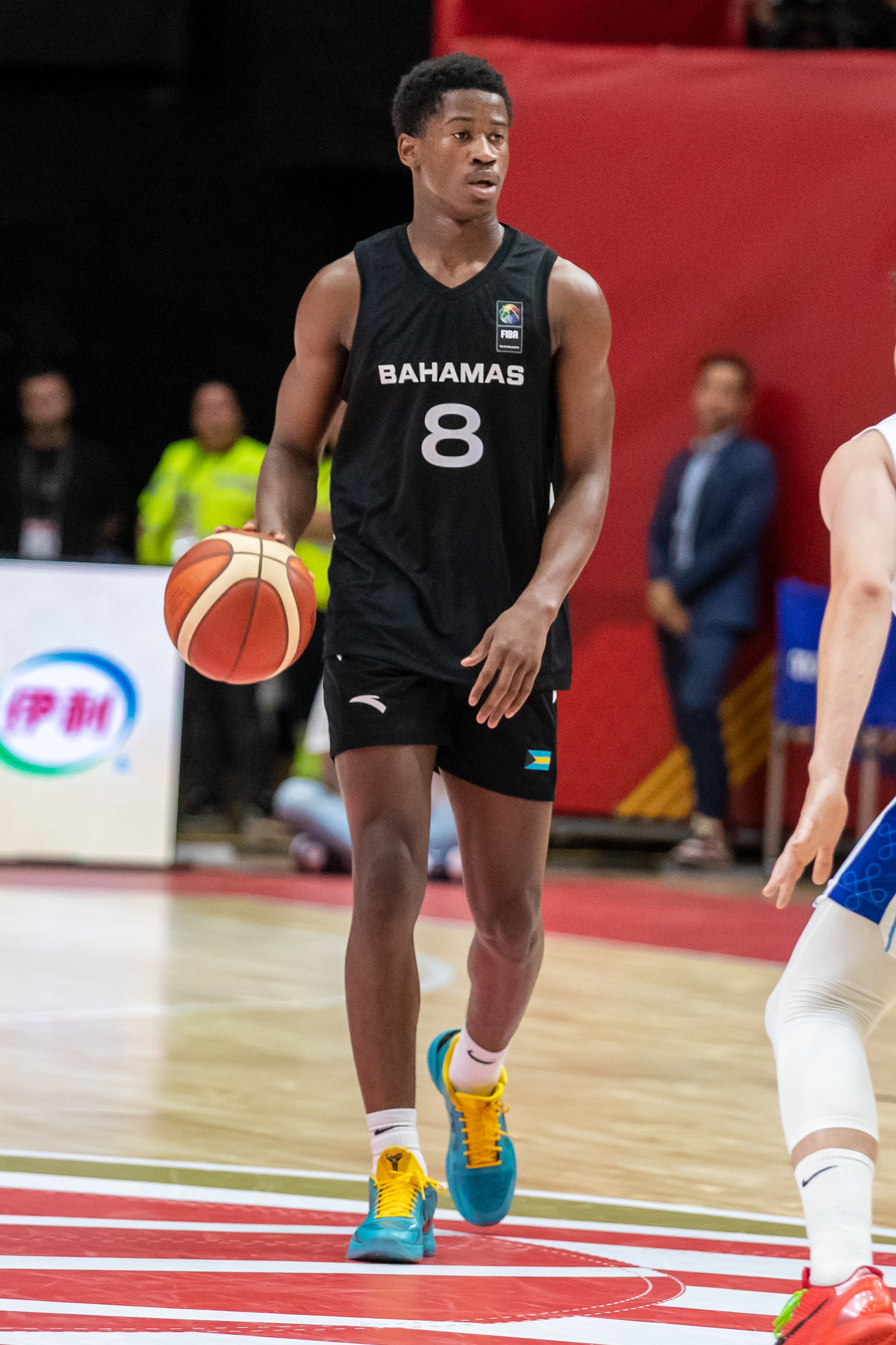
- Edgecombe in 2024

No. 77 – Philadelphia 76ers
- Position: Shooting guard
- League: NBA

Personal information
- Born: July 30, 2005 (age 21) Bimini, the Bahamas
- Listed height: 6 ft 5 in (1.96 m)
- Listed weight: 190 lb (86 kg)

Career information
- High school: Victory International Institute (West Palm Beach, Florida); Long Island Lutheran (Brookville, New York)
- College: Baylor (2024–2025)
- NBA draft: 2025: 1st round, 3rd overall pick
- Drafted by: Philadelphia 76ers
- Playing career: 2025–present

Career history
- 2025–present: Philadelphia 76ers

Career highlights
- NBA All-Rookie First Team (2026); Second-team All-Big 12 (2025); Big 12 Freshman of the Year (2025); Big 12 All-Freshman Team (2025); McDonald's All-American (2024)
- Stats at NBA.com
- Stats at Basketball Reference

Valdez Drexel "V. J." Edgecombe Jr. (born July 30, 2005) is a Bahamian professional basketball player for the Philadelphia 76ers of the National Basketball Association (NBA). He played college basketball for the Baylor Bears. He was a consensus five-star recruit and one of the top players in the 2024 class. Edgecombe was selected with the third overall pick by the 76ers in the 2025 NBA draft.

== Early life and high school career ==
Edgecombe was born and spent his childhood in Bimini, The Bahamas.

Edgecombe described himself as "[coming] from nothing", living off a generator due to limited electricity. He immigrated to the United States when he was in ninth grade, originally settling in Florida with his older brother Lortario. He attended Victory International Institute in West Palm Beach, Florida for two years before transferring to Long Island Lutheran Middle and High School in Brookville, New York as a boarding student. He averaged 15.5 points, five rebounds, 2.3 assists and 2.2 steals per game during his junior season as the Crusaders won the state championship. Edgecombe was named the New York Gatorade Player of the Year and the National Interscholastic Basketball Conference (NIBC) Player of the Year at the end of the season. As a senior, Edgecombe averaged 17.3 points, six rebounds, four assists and 2.3 steals per game to lead the Crusaders to a 21–5 record. During his senior year, he was selected to play in the 2024 McDonald's All-American Boys Game.

=== Recruiting ===
Edgecombe was a consensus five-star recruit and one of the top players in the 2024 class, according to major recruiting services. He was originally rated 153rd in the composite ranking of 247Sports, but moved up to the top five following his performance in the Adidas 3SSB travel circuit as a junior. On January 14, 2024, Edgecombe committed to playing college basketball for Baylor after considering offers from Duke and Kentucky.

College recruiting
Name	Hometown	School	Height	Weight	Commit date
V. J. Edgecombe; SG	Bimini, the Bahamas	Long Island Lutheran (NY)	6 ft 5 in (1.96 m)	180 lb (82 kg)	Jan 14, 2024
V. J. Edgecombe; SG	Recruit ratings: Rivals: 247Sports: On3: ESPN: (96)				
Overall recruit ranking: Rivals: 4 247Sports: 5 On3: 4 ESPN: 3
Note: In many cases, Scout, Rivals, 247Sports, On3, and ESPN may conflict in their listings of height and weight.; In these cases, the average was taken. ESPN grades are on a 100-point scale.; Sources: "Baylor 2024 Basketball Commitments". Rivals.; "2024 Baylor Bears Recruiting Class". ESPN.; "2024 Team Ranking". Rivals.

== College career ==
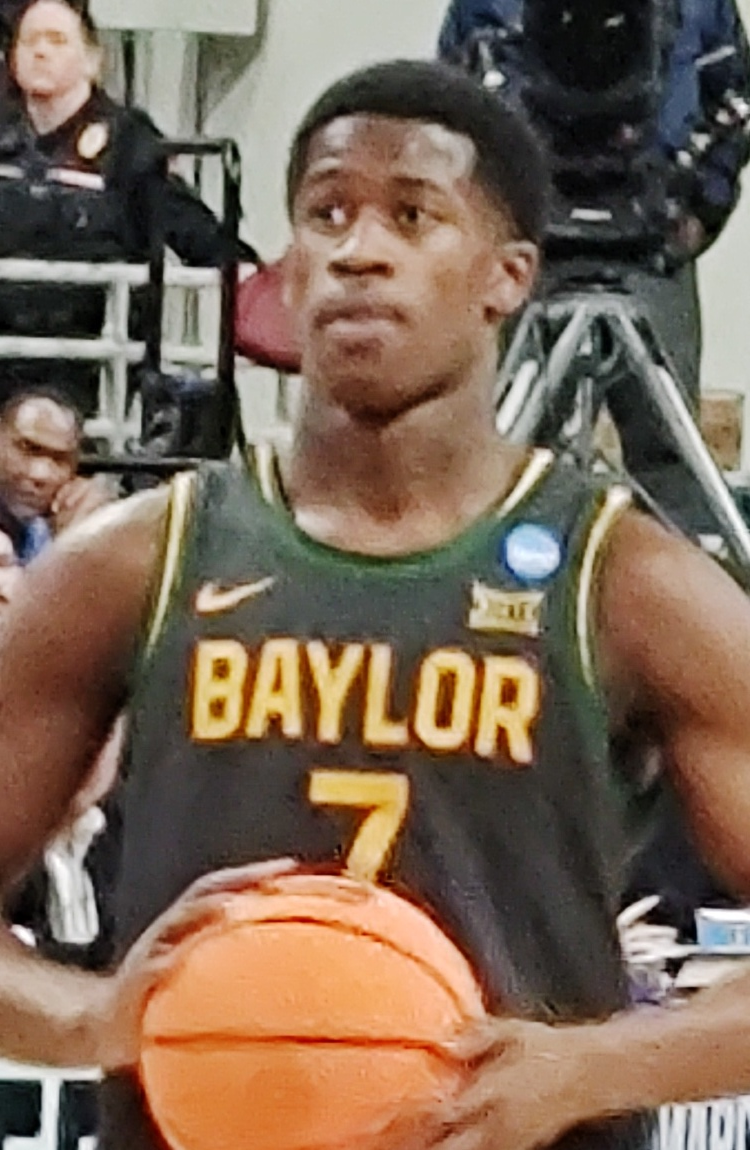
Edgecombe at the line to shoot a free throw for Baylor in 2025

During his single season at Baylor, Edgecombe averaged 15 points, 5.4 rebounds, 3.3 assists and 2.1 steals per game while shooting 43.8 percent from the field. He was named Big 12 Freshman of the Year. Following the season, Edgecombe declared for the 2025 NBA draft, forfeiting his remaining collegiate eligibility.

== Professional career ==
Edgecombe was selected with the third overall pick by the Philadelphia 76ers in the 2025 NBA draft. In his NBA regular-season debut on October 22, 2025, Edgecombe scored 34 points, pulled down seven rebounds and collected three assists to help the Sixers to a 117–116 win against the Boston Celtics. His 34 points were the most all-time in an NBA debut in Sixers franchise history, surpassing the previous record of 30 set by Allen Iverson, and the third-most all time in NBA history, trailing only Wilt Chamberlain (43; 1959) and Frank Selvy (35; 1954). He also surpassed LeBron James' previous record (12) for the most points scored in a quarter in an NBA debut, with 14. On November 4, Edgecombe recorded his first career double-double, with 12 points and 11 rebounds in a 113–111 loss to the Chicago Bulls. On March 19, 2026, Edgecombe recorded a career-high 38 points, along with 11 assists, in a 139–118 win against the Sacramento Kings.

In Game 2 of the Eastern Conference First Round against the Boston Celtics, Edgecombe recorded 30 points and 10 rebounds in a 111–97 win, becoming the youngest player in NBA history to record a 30-point, 10-rebound game in the postseason, as well as the first rookie to do so since Tim Duncan in 1998. During the playoffs, it was announced that Edgecombe had finished third in NBA Rookie of the Year voting behind Cooper Flagg and Kon Knueppel and had been selected to the NBA All-Rookie First Team.

== National team career ==
Edgecombe was named to the Bahamas national team for the 2024 Olympic Qualifying Tournament in Valencia. Edgecombe averaged 16.5 points, 5.5 rebounds, and 3.8 assists in four games.

Although limited by foul trouble in the final against Spain, Edgecombe made several key baskets and helped the Bahamas close the gap late in the game before ultimately falling short.

== Career statistics ==
Legend
GP	Games played	GS	Games started	MPG	Minutes per game
FG%	Field goal percentage	3P%	3-point field goal percentage	FT%	Free throw percentage
RPG	Rebounds per game	APG	Assists per game	SPG	Steals per game
BPG	Blocks per game	PPG	Points per game	**Bold**	Career high

=== NBA ===
==== Regular season ====
Year	Team	GP	GS	MPG	FG%	3P%	FT%	RPG	APG	SPG	BPG	PPG
2025–26	Philadelphia	75	75	35.0	.438	.354	.818	5.6	4.2	1.4	.5	16.0
Career		75	75	35.0	.438	.354	.818	5.6	4.2	1.4	.5	16.0

==== Playoffs ====
Year	Team	GP	GS	MPG	FG%	3P%	FT%	RPG	APG	SPG	BPG	PPG
2026	Philadelphia	11	11	37.0	.414	.292	.722	6.1	3.4	1.0	.4	14.0
Career		11	11	37.0	.414	.292	.722	6.1	3.4	1.0	.4	14.0

=== College ===
Year	Team	GP	GS	MPG	FG%	3P%	FT%	RPG	APG	SPG	BPG	PPG
2024–25	Baylor	33	33	32.7	.436	.340	.782	5.6	3.2	2.1	.6	15.0
