= Jeremy Roach =

American basketball player

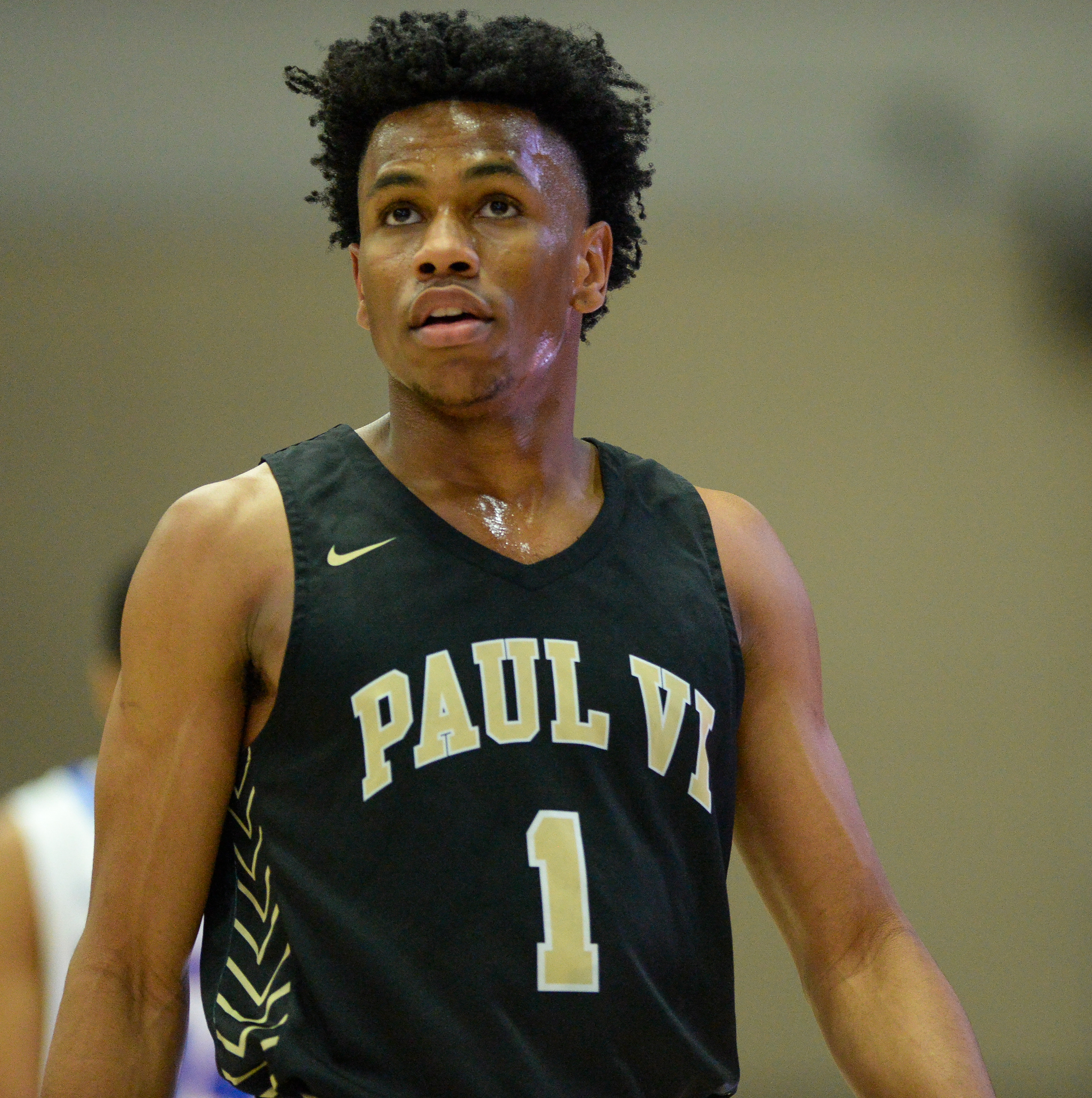
- Roach in Paul VI Catholic High School

No. 5 – Oldenburg
- Position: Point guard
- League: Basketball Bundesliga

Personal information
- Born: November 1, 2001 (age 25) Washington, D.C., U.S.
- Listed height: 6 ft 2 in (1.88 m)
- Listed weight: 180 lb (82 kg)

Career information
- High school: Paul VI Catholic (Fairfax, Virginia)
- College: Duke (2020–2024); Baylor (2024–2025)
- NBA draft: 2025: undrafted
- Playing career: 2025–present

Career history
- 2025–2026: King Szczecin
- 2026–present: Baskets Oldenburg

Career highlights
- Third-team All-ACC (2024); McDonald's All-American (2020); Nike Hoop Summit (2020)
Medals
Men's basketball
Representing the United States
FIBA Under-17 World Cup
Gold medal – first place	2018 Argentina	Team
FIBA Americas U16 Championship
Gold medal – first place	2017 Argentina	Team

Jeremy Hunter Roach (born November 1, 2001) is an American professional basketball player for Baskets Oldenburg of the German Basketball Bundesliga (BBL). He played college basketball for the Baylor Bears and Duke Blue Devils.

== High school career ==
As a freshman in 2016–17, Roach averaged 11.1 points to help lead his team to a 17–4 record and a runner-up finish in the WCAC. As a sophomore in 2017–18, Roach averaged 15.2 points to help his team to a 33–4 record, including 18–0 in the Washington Catholic Athletic Conference, and a VISAA championship.

Roach would miss the rest of his junior season after he suffered a torn ACL during a scrimmage.

As a senior, he averaged 19.1 points, 6.3 rebounds, 2.8 assists and 1.9 steals per game and guided his school to the VISAA D-I State Championship.

Roach was selected to play in the McDonald's All-American Game, Jordan Brand Classic and Nike Hoop Summit, but all three games were canceled due to the COVID-19 pandemic.

=== Recruiting ===
Roach was a consensus five-star recruit and one of the best point guards in the 2020 class. On May 8, 2019, he committed to playing college basketball for Duke over offers from Kentucky, North Carolina, and Villanova.

College recruiting
Name	Hometown	School	Height	Weight	Commit date
Jeremy Roach; PG	Leesburg, VA	Paul VI Catholic (VA)	6 ft 2 in (1.88 m)	180 lb (82 kg)	May 8, 2019
Jeremy Roach; PG	Recruit ratings: Rivals: 247Sports: ESPN: (94)				
Overall recruit ranking: Rivals: 25 247Sports: 24 ESPN: 19
Note: In many cases, Scout, Rivals, 247Sports, On3, and ESPN may conflict in their listings of height and weight.; In these cases, the average was taken. ESPN grades are on a 100-point scale.; Sources: "Duke 2020 Basketball Commitments". Rivals.; "2020 Duke Blue Devils Recruiting Class". ESPN.; "2020 Team Ranking". Rivals.

== College career ==
As a freshman, Roach averaged 8.7 points and 2.8 assists per game while shooting 45.6 percent from the floor. He averaged 8.6 points and 3.2 assists per game as a sophomore. As a junior, Roach averaged 13.6 points, 3.1 assists and 2.5 rebounds per game. Following the season he declared for the 2023 NBA draft before withdrawing and returning to Duke.

== Professional career ==
=== King Szczecin (2025–present) ===
On July 27, 2025, he signed with King Szczecin of the Polish Basketball League (PLK).

== National team career ==
Roach played for the United States national under-16 team at the 2017 FIBA Under-16 Americas Championship. Roach averaged 10.6 points, 1.4 rebounds, and 2.8 assists per game, helping his team win the gold medal.

Roach played for the United States national under-17 team at the 2018 FIBA Under-17 Basketball World Cup in Rosario and Santa Fe, Argentina. In seven games, he averaged 6.4 points and 2.7 assists per game, helping his team win the gold medal.

== Career statistics ==
Legend
GP	Games played	GS	Games started	MPG	Minutes per game
FG%	Field goal percentage	3P%	3-point field goal percentage	FT%	Free throw percentage
RPG	Rebounds per game	APG	Assists per game	SPG	Steals per game
BPG	Blocks per game	PPG	Points per game	**Bold**	Career high

=== College ===
Year	Team	GP	GS	MPG	FG%	3P%	FT%	RPG	APG	SPG	BPG	PPG
2020–21	Duke	24	18	27.4	.456	.313	.675	2.2	2.8	.8	.0	8.7
2021–22	Duke	**39**	27	29.4	.410	.322	.763	2.4	3.2	.8	**.1**	8.6
2022–23	Duke	32	30	**33.2**	.427	.343	.780	**2.5**	3.1	.9	.0	13.6
2023–24	Duke	35	**33**	32.7	**.468**	**.429**	**.844**	**2.5**	**3.3**	**1.1**	**.1**	**14.0**
2024–25	Baylor	29	18	28.5	.379	.333	.694	1.9	2.6	.9	**.1**	10.0
Career		159	126	30.4	.428	.351	.775	2.3	3.0	.9	.1	11.1
