= 2024–25 BYU Cougars men's basketball team =

American college basketball season

2024–25 BYU Cougars men's basketball
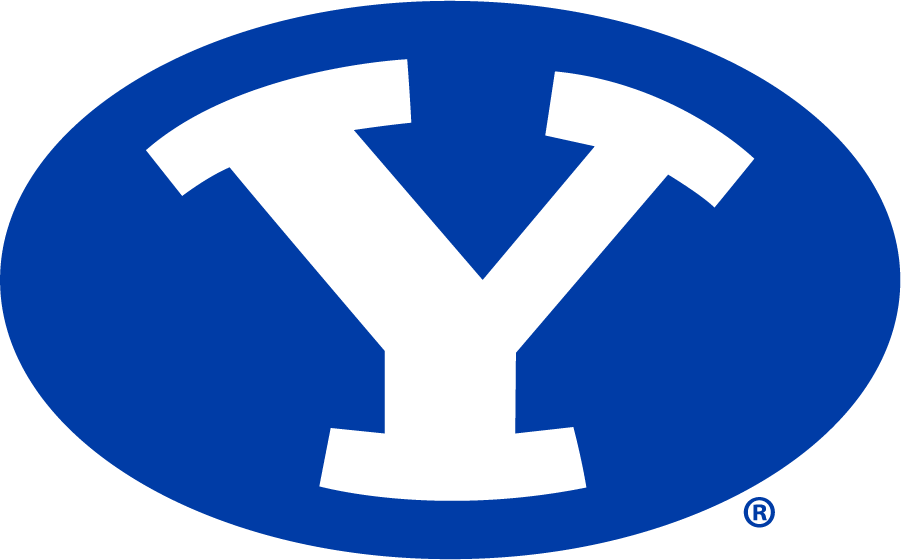

NCAA tournament, Sweet Sixteen
- Conference: Big 12 Conference

Ranking
- Coaches: No. 15
- AP: No. 13
- Record: 26–10 (14–6 Big 12)
- Head coach: Kevin Young (1st season)
- Assistant coaches: Will Voigt; Brandon Dunson; Chris Burgess; Tim Fanning; John Linehan
- Home arena: Marriott Center

2024–25 Big 12 men's basketball standings
	Conf.				Overall
Team	W		L	PCT	W		L	PCT
No. 2 Houston †	19	–	1	.950	35	–	5	.875
No. 8 Texas Tech	15	–	5	.750	28	–	9	.757
No. 15 Arizona	14	–	6	.700	24	–	13	.649
No. 13 BYU	14	–	6	.700	26	–	10	.722
No. 17 Iowa State	13	–	7	.650	25	–	10	.714
Kansas	11	–	9	.550	21	–	13	.618
Baylor	10	–	10	.500	20	–	15	.571
West Virginia	10	–	10	.500	19	–	13	.594
TCU	9	–	11	.450	16	–	16	.500
Kansas State	9	–	11	.450	16	–	17	.485
Utah	8	–	12	.400	16	–	17	.485
Oklahoma State	7	–	13	.350	17	–	18	.486
Cincinnati	7	–	13	.350	19	–	16	.543
UCF	7	–	13	.350	20	–	17	.541
Arizona State	4	–	16	.200	13	–	20	.394
Colorado	3	–	17	.150	14	–	21	.400
† 2025 Big 12 tournament winner Rankings from AP poll

The 2024–25 BYU Cougars men's basketball team represented Brigham Young University during the 2024–25 NCAA Division I men's basketball season. The Cougars were led by first-year head coach Kevin Young and played their home games at Marriott Center in Provo, Utah as second-year members of the Big 12 Conference.

The BYU Cougars drew an average home attendance of 17,054, the 7th-highest of all college basketball teams.

== Previous season ==
The Cougars finished the 2023–24 season 23–11, 10–8 in Big 12 play to finish in a tie for fifth place. As the No. 5 seed in the Big 12 tournament, they defeated UCF in the second round before losing to Texas Tech. They received an at-large bid to the NCAA tournament as the No. 6 seed in the East region. The Cougars lost in the first round to Duquesne.

On April 12, 2024, head coach Mark Pope left the school to take the head coaching position at Kentucky.

The season marked the first for BYU as members of the Big 12, having left the West Coast conference to join the Big 12 on July 1, 2023.

== Offseason ==
=== Departures ===
Name	Number	Pos.	Height	Weight	Year	Hometown	Reason for departure
Noah Waterman	0	F	6'11"	215	Junior	Savannah, NY	Transferred to Louisville
Jaxson Robinson	2	F	6'7"	200	Junior	Ada, OK	Transferred to Kentucky
Atiki Ally Atiki	4	F	6'10"	213	Junior	Mwanza, Tanzania	Transferred to New Mexico
Tredyn Christensen	10	F	6'7"	235	Senior	Eagle Mountain, UT	Walk-on; graduated
Spencer Johnson	20	G	6'5"	185	(redshirt) Senior	American Fork, UT	Graduated
Marcus Adams Jr.	23	F	6'8"	200	Freshman	Harbor City, UT	Transferred to Cal State Northridge
Tanner Hayhurst	24	G	6'6"	204	(redshirt) Freshman	Eagle, ID	Walk-on; transferred College of Southern Idaho
Aly Khalifa	50	F/C	6'11"	230	(redshirt) Junior	Alexandria, Egypt	Transferred to Louisville

=== Incoming transfers ===
Name	Number	Pos.	Height	Weight	Year	Hometown	Previous School
Keba Keita	13	C	6'8"	235	Junior	Bamako, Mali	Utah
Mawot Mag	0	F	6'7"	216	RS Senior	Melbourne, Australia	Rutgers
Max Triplett	20	F/C	6'9"	210	Junior	Huntsville, UT	Snow College

=== Recruiting classes ===
==== 2024 recruiting class ====
College recruiting information
Name	Hometown	School	Height	Weight	Commit date
Egor Dëmin; SG	Russia	Real Madrid	6 ft 8 in (2.03 m)	190 lb (86 kg)	May 28, 2024
Egor Dëmin; SG	Recruit ratings: Rivals: 247Sports: ESPN: (NR)				
Kanon Catchings #9 SF	Brownsburg, IN	Overtime Elite	6 ft 6 in (1.98 m)	190 lb (86 kg)	Jun 18, 2024
Kanon Catchings #9 SF	Recruit ratings: Rivals: 247Sports: ESPN: (88)				
Brody Kozlowski #17 PF	Draper, UT	Corner Canyon High School	6 ft 8 in (2.03 m)	220 lb (100 kg)	Apr 22, 2024
Brody Kozlowski #17 PF	Recruit ratings: Rivals: 247Sports: ESPN: (82)				
Elijah Crawford #18 PG	Augusta, GA	Brewster Academy	6 ft 1 in (1.85 m)	175 lb (79 kg)	May 21, 2024
Elijah Crawford #18 PG	Recruit ratings: Rivals: 247Sports: ESPN: (82)				
Brooks Bahr; PF	Keller, TX	Keller High School	6 ft 4 in (1.93 m)	175 lb (79 kg)	Nov 6, 2023
Brooks Bahr; PF	Recruit ratings: Rivals: 247Sports: ESPN: (79)				
Mihailo Boskovic; PF	Uzice, Serbia	Igokea m:tel	6 ft 10 in (2.08 m)	N/A	Sep 4, 2024
Mihailo Boskovic; PF	Recruit ratings: No ratings found				
Overall recruit ranking: Scout: nr Rivals: nr ESPN: nr
Note: In many cases, Scout, Rivals, 247Sports, On3, and ESPN may conflict in their listings of height and weight.; In these cases, the average was taken. ESPN grades are on a 100-point scale.; Sources: "ESPN". ESPN.; "2024 Team Ranking". Rivals.

== Roster ==
2024–25 BYU Cougars men's basketball team
Players
Coaches

Pos.	#	Name	Height	Weight	Year	Previous school	Hometown
F	0	Mawot Mag	6 ft 7 in (2.01 m)	216 lb (98 kg)	GS	Rutgers	Melbourne, Australia
G	1	Trey Stewart	6 ft 2 in (1.88 m)	189 lb (86 kg)	Sr	American Fork	American Fork, UT
G	2	Elijah Crawford	6 ft 2 in (1.88 m)	—	Fr	Brewster Academy	Augusta, GA
G	3	Egor Dëmin	6 ft 9 in (2.06 m)	200 lb (91 kg)	Fr	Real Madrid	Moscow, Russia
F	4	Brody Kozlowski	6 ft 8 in (2.03 m)	210 lb (95 kg)	Fr	Corner Canyon	Draper, UT
F	5	Mihailo Boskovic	6 ft 10 in (2.08 m)	215 lb (98 kg)	Jr	Igokea m:tel	Užice, Serbia
F	6	Kanon Catchings	6 ft 9 in (2.06 m)	185 lb (84 kg)	Fr	Overtime Elite	Brownsburg, IN
F	7	Khadim Mboup	6 ft 9 in (2.06 m)	—		NBA Academy Africa	Dakar, Senegal
F	12	Townsend Tripple (W)	6 ft 8 in (2.03 m)	200 lb (91 kg)	RS So	Rocky Mountain	Meridian, ID
C	13	Keba Keita	6 ft 8 in (2.03 m)	235 lb (107 kg)	Jr	Utah	Bamako, Mali
G	15	Richie Saunders	6 ft 5 in (1.96 m)	200 lb (91 kg)	Jr	Wasatch Academy	Riverton, UT
F/C	20	Max Triplett (W)	6 ft 9 in (2.06 m)	210 lb (95 kg)	Jr	Snow College	Huntsville, UT
G	21	Trevin Knell	6 ft 5 in (1.96 m)	197 lb (89 kg)	RS Sr	Woods Cross	Woods Cross, UT
G	25	Dawson Baker	6 ft 4 in (1.93 m)	190 lb (86 kg)	RS Jr	UC Irvine	Coto de Caza, CA
G	30	Dallin Hall	6 ft 4 in (1.93 m)	180 lb (82 kg)	Jr	Fremont	Plain City, UT
F	45	Fousseyni Traore	6 ft 6 in (1.98 m)	254 lb (115 kg)	Sr	Wasatch Academy	Bamako, Mali
G	51	Jared McGregor (W)	6 ft 2 in (1.88 m)	185 lb (84 kg)	Jr	Westlake	Saratoga Springs, UT

Head coach

- Kevin Young (Clayton State)

Assistant coach(es)

- Will Voigt (Pomona)
- Brandon Dunson (Arizona State)
- Chris Burgess (Utah)
- Tim Fanning (Whittier)
- John Linehan (Providence)

Legend

- (C) Team captain
- (S) Suspended
- (I) Ineligible
- (W) Walk-on
- Injured
- Current redshirt

Roster

== Schedule and results ==
Date time, TV	Rank^{#}	Opponent^{#}	Result	Record	High points	High rebounds	High assists	Site (attendance) city, state
Exhibition
October 30, 2024*; 7:00 p.m.		Colorado Christian	W 93–49	–	19 – Catchings	7 – Keita	11 – Dëmin	Marriott Center (16,323); Provo, UT
Non-conference regular season
November 5, 2024*; 7:00 p.m., ESPN+		Central Arkansas	W 88–50	1–0	18 – Dëmin	10 – Keita	11 – Dëmin	Marriott Center (16,941); Provo, UT
November 8, 2024*; 7:00 p.m., ESPN+		UC Riverside	W 86–80	2–0	20 – Dëmin	10 – Keita	7 – Dëmin	Marriott Center (17,391); Provo, UT
November 13, 2024*; 7:00 p.m., ESPN+		Queens (NC)	W 99–55	3–0	22 – Baker	13 – Keita	5 – Dëmin	Marriott Center (16,789); Provo, UT
November 16, 2024*; 1:00 p.m., ESPN+		Idaho	W 95–71	4–0	29 – Traore	9 – Traore	7 – Dëmin	Marriott Center (16,456); Provo, UT
November 23, 2024*; 7:00 p.m., ESPN+		Mississippi Valley State	W 87–43	5–0	15 – Traore	11 – Traore	6 – Dëmin	Marriott Center (16,954); Provo, UT
November 28, 2024*; 3:30 p.m., FS1		vs. No. 23 Ole Miss; Rady Children's Invitational semifinals	L 85–96 ^{OT}	5–1	17 – Catchings	7 – Keita	4 – Tied	LionTree Arena (4,000); San Diego, CA
November 29, 2024*; 1:30 p.m., FOX		vs. NC State; Rady Children's Invitational 3rd place game	W 72–61	6–1	13 – Saunders	11 – Dëmin	4 – Dëmin	LionTree Arena (4,000); San Diego, CA
December 3, 2024*; 6:30 p.m., FS1		at Providence; Big East–Big 12 Battle	L 64–83	6–2	16 – Baker	10 – Keita	4 – Hall	Amica Mutual Pavilion (12,005); Providence, RI
December 11, 2024*; 7:00 p.m., ESPN+		Fresno State	W 95–67	7–2	22 – Knell	10 – Tied	4 – Hall	Marriott Center (15,950); Provo, UT
December 14, 2024*; 7:00 p.m., ESPN+		vs. Wyoming	W 68–49	8–2	15 – Knell	6 – Keita	6 – Hall	Delta Center (11,217); Salt Lake City, UT
December 20, 2024*; 7:00 p.m., ESPN+		Florida A&M	W 103–57	9–2	21 – Catchings	9 – Keita	7 – Hall	Marriott Center (15,544); Provo, UT
Big 12 regular season
December 31, 2024; 2:00 p.m., ESPN2		Arizona State	W 76–56	10–2 (1–0)	30 – Saunders	10 – Keita	7 – Dëmin	Marriott Center (16,926); Provo, UT
January 4, 2025; 12:00 p.m., ESPN+		at No. 14 Houston	L 55–86	10–3 (1–1)	12 – Knell	6 – Traore	7 – Dëmin	Fertitta Center (7,035); Houston, TX
January 7, 2025; 7:00 p.m., ESPN+		Texas Tech	L 67–72	10–4 (1–2)	14 – Traore	10 – Keita	6 – Dëmin	Marriott Center (17,307); Provo, UT
January 11, 2025; 12:00 p.m., ESPN2		at TCU	L 67–71	10–5 (1–3)	26 – Saunders	7 – Tied	6 – Hall	Schollmaier Arena (4,752); Fort Worth, TX
January 14, 2025; 7:00 p.m., ESPN+		Oklahoma State	W 85–69	11–5 (2–3)	18 – Knell	8 – Keita	8 – Dëmin	Marriott Center (16,457); Provo, UT
January 18, 2025; 7:00 p.m., ESPN+		at Utah; Rivalry	L 72–73 ^{OT}	11–6 (2–4)	16 – Saunders	9 – Keita	4 – Saunders	Jon M. Huntsman Center (15,558); Salt Lake City, UT
January 21, 2025; 9:00 p.m., ESPNU		at Colorado	W 83–67	12–6 (3–4)	25 – Saunders	8 – Keita	7 – Dëmin	CU Events Center (6,166); Boulder, CO
January 25, 2025; 8:30 p.m., ESPN2		Cincinnati	W 80–52	13–6 (4–4)	21 – Saunders	7 – Keita	7 – Dëmin	Marriott Center (17,483); Provo, UT
January 28, 2025; 7:00 p.m., ESPN2		Baylor	W 93–89 ^{OT}	14–6 (5–4)	23 – Catchings	6 – Saunders	6 – Dëmin	Marriott Center (17,297); Provo, UT
February 1, 2025; 2:00 p.m., ESPN+		at UCF	W 81–75	15–6 (6–4)	22 – Saunders	7 – Keita	6 – Dëmin	Addition Financial Arena (9,152); Orlando, FL
February 4, 2025; 9:00 p.m., ESPN		No. 20 Arizona	L 74–85	15–7 (6–5)	16 – Dëmin	7 – Traore	6 – Hall	Marriott Center (17,274); Provo, UT
February 8, 2025; 4:00 p.m., ESPN2		at Cincinnati	L 66–84	15–8 (6–6)	15 – Saunders	3 – Tied	3 – Hall	Fifth Third Arena (12,217); Cincinnati, OH
February 11, 2025; 5:00 p.m., CBSSN		at West Virginia	W 73–69	16–8 (7–6)	16 – Dëmin	6 – Traore	4 – Hall	WVU Coliseum (10,879); Morgantown, WV
February 15, 2025; 7:00 p.m., ESPN+		Kansas State	W 80–65	17–8 (8–6)	17 – Saunders	14 – Saunders	8 – Dëmin	Marriott Center (17,228); Provo, UT
February 18, 2025; 7:00 p.m., ESPN		No. 23 Kansas	W 91–57	18–8 (9–6)	22 – Saunders	9 – Keita	8 – Hall	Marriott Center (17,978); Provo, UT
February 22, 2025; 8:00 p.m., ESPN		at No. 19 Arizona	W 96–95	19–8 (10–6)	23 – Saunders	6 – Keita	8 – Dëmin	McKale Center (14,688); Tucson, AZ
February 26, 2025; 7:30 p.m., ESPN+	No. 25	at Arizona State	W 91–81	20–8 (11–6)	26 – Saunders	7 – Keita	10 – Dëmin	Desert Financial Arena (9,383); Tempe, AZ
March 1, 2025; 8:00 p.m., ESPN2	No. 25	West Virginia	W 77–56	21–8 (12–6)	20 – Traore	10 – Traore	6 – Hall	Marriott Center (17,978); Provo, UT
March 4, 2025; 7:00 p.m., ESPN2	No. 23	at No. 10 Iowa State	W 88–85 ^{2OT}	22–8 (13–6)	23 – Saunders	15 – Keita	3 – Tied	Hilton Coliseum (14,267); Ames, IA
March 8, 2025; 8:00 p.m., ESPNU	No. 23	Utah; Rivalry	W 85–74	23–8 (14–6)	15 – Baker	7 – Tied	6 – Dëmin	Marriott Center (17,978); Provo, UT
Big 12 tournament
March 13, 2025; 10:30 a.m., ESPN2	(4) No. 17	vs. (5) No. 12 Iowa State; Quarterfinals	W 96−92	24–8	23 – Saunders	10 – Keita	7 – Hall	T-Mobile Center (15,366); Kansas City, MO
March 14, 2025; 5:00 p.m., ESPN2	(4) No. 17	vs. (1) No. 2 Houston; Semifinals	L 54–74	24–9	14 – Keita	12 – Keita	4 – Tied	T-Mobile Center (13,946); Kansas City, MO
NCAA tournament
March 20, 2025; 2:05 p.m., TNT	(6 E) No. 17	vs. (11 E) VCU; First Round	W 80–71	25–9	16 – Saunders	9 – Tied	4 – Hall	Ball Arena (19,921); Denver, CO
March 22, 2025; 5:45 p.m., CBS	(6 E) No. 17	vs. (3 E) No. 13 Wisconsin; Second Round	W 91–89	26–9	25 – Saunders	8 – Dëmin	8 – Dëmin	Ball Arena (19,386); Denver, CO
March 27, 2025; 5:09 p.m., CBS	(6 E) No. 17	vs. (2 E) No. 7 Alabama; Sweet Sixteen	L 88–113	26–10	25 – Saunders	6 – Tied	7 – Dëmin	Prudential Center (18,617); Newark, NJ
*Non-conference game. ^{#}Rankings from AP Poll. (#) Tournament seedings in parentheses. E=East. All times are in Mountain Time.

== Rankings ==
Ranking movements Legend: ██ Increase in ranking ██ Decrease in ranking — = Not ranked RV = Received votes
	Week																				
Poll	Pre	1	2	3	4	5	6	7	8	9	10	11	12	13	14	15	16	17	18	19	Final
AP	RV	RV	RV	RV	RV	—	—	—	—	—	—	—	—	—	—	—	25	23	17	17	13
Coaches	RV	RV	RV	RV	RV	—	—	—	—	—	—	—	—	—	RV	—	RV	22	18	17	15

== Awards ==
Two BYU players received All-Big 12 awards for the season. Richie Saunders was named to the All-Big 12 First Team and recognized as the conference's Most Improved Player, and Egor Dëmin received honorable mention All-Big 12 honors and was named to the conference's All-Freshman team.
