= 2024–25 Utah Utes men's basketball team =

American college basketball season

2024–25 Utah Utes men's basketball

College Basketball Crown, First Round
- Conference: Big 12 Conference
- Record: 16–17 (8–12 Big 12)
- Head coach: Craig Smith (4th season; first 27 games, 15−12); Josh Eilert (interim, rest of season)
- Assistant coaches: David Evans; Lo Leath
- Home arena: Jon M. Huntsman Center (Capacity: 15,000)

2024–25 Big 12 men's basketball standings
	Conf.				Overall
Team	W		L	PCT	W		L	PCT
No. 2 Houston †	19	–	1	.950	35	–	5	.875
No. 8 Texas Tech	15	–	5	.750	28	–	9	.757
No. 15 Arizona	14	–	6	.700	24	–	13	.649
No. 13 BYU	14	–	6	.700	26	–	10	.722
No. 17 Iowa State	13	–	7	.650	25	–	10	.714
Kansas	11	–	9	.550	21	–	13	.618
Baylor	10	–	10	.500	20	–	15	.571
West Virginia	10	–	10	.500	19	–	13	.594
TCU	9	–	11	.450	16	–	16	.500
Kansas State	9	–	11	.450	16	–	17	.485
Utah	8	–	12	.400	16	–	17	.485
Oklahoma State	7	–	13	.350	17	–	18	.486
Cincinnati	7	–	13	.350	19	–	16	.543
UCF	7	–	13	.350	20	–	17	.541
Arizona State	4	–	16	.200	13	–	20	.394
Colorado	3	–	17	.150	14	–	21	.400
† 2025 Big 12 tournament winner Rankings from AP poll

The 2024–25 Utah Runnin' Utes men's basketball team represented the University of Utah during the 2024–25 NCAA Division I men's basketball season. The team was led by interim coach Josh Eilert and played their home games at the Jon M. Huntsman Center located in Salt Lake City, Utah. This is the Utes' first season in the Big 12 Conference.

The school fired fourth-year head coach Craig Smith on February 24, 2025. Assistant coach Josh Eilert was named the interim coach.

== Previous season ==
The Utes finished the 2023–24 season 22–15, 9–11 in Pac-12 play to finish in a tie for sixth place. As the No. 6 seed in the Pac-12 tournament, Utah won their first-round game against Arizona State before losing to Colorado in the quarterfinals. The team received a bid to the National Invitation Tournament, being the only Pac-12 team to accept one of two automatic bids for teams in the conference. This marked the program's first appearance in a postseason tournament since the 2018 NIT. They defeated UC Irvine, Iowa, and VCU to advance to the semifinals. There they were eliminated by Indiana State.

The season marked the team's final season in the Pac-12, leaving to join the Big 12 in 2024.

== Offseason ==
=== Departures ===
Name	Num.	Pos.	Height	Weight	Year	Hometown	Reason for departure
Ben Carlson	1	F	6'9"	223 lbs	Senior	Woodbury, MN	Pursuing pro career (signed by QTSA United)
Cole Bajema	2	G	6'7"	188 lbs	GS	Lynden, WA	Graduated
Deivon Smith	5	G	6'0"	173 lbs	Senior	Decatur, GA	Transferred to St. John's
Wilguens Jr. Exacte	11	G	6'6"	236 lbs	Sophomore	Montreal, Canada	Transferred to Bowling Green
Keba Keita	13	C	6'8"	231 lbs	Sophomore	Bamako, Mali	Transferred to BYU
Luka Tarlac	21	G	6'7"	220 lbs	Sophomore	Belgrade, Serbia	Transferred to Cal Poly
Rollie Worster	25	G	6'4"	204 lbs	Senior	Missoula, MT	Transferred to Nebraska
Branden Carlson	35	C	7'0"	220 lbs	GS	South Jordan, UT	Graduated (signed by the Toronto Raptors)

=== Incoming transfers ===
Name	Num.	Pos.	Height	Weight	Year	Hometown	Previous school(s)
Miro Little	1	G	6'3"	194 lbs	Sophomore	Tampere, Finland	Baylor
Ezra Ausar	2	F	6'8"	242 lbs	Junior	Atlanta, GA	East Carolina
Brady Smith	6	G	6'1"	173 lbs	Sophomore	Logan, UT	Salt Lake CC
Keanu Dawes	8	F	6'9"	218 lbs	Forward	Houston, TX	Rice
Caleb Lohner	11	F	6'8"	235 lbs	GS	Flower Mound, TX	BYU, Baylor
Mike Sharavjamts	25	G	6'9"	190 lbs	Junior	Ulaanbaatar, Mongolia	Dayton, San Francisco
Zach Keller	32	F	6'10"	234 lbs	Junior	Highlands Ranch, CO	Wake Forest
Mason Madsen	45	G	6'4"	193 lbs	GS	Rochester, MN	Cincinnati, Boston College

=== Recruiting classes ===
==== 2024 recruiting class ====
College recruiting information
Name	Hometown	School	Height	Weight	Commit date
Jaxon Johnson; PF	Sandy, UT	Alta High School	6 ft 9 in (2.06 m)	200 lb (91 kg)	Nov 2, 2023
Jaxon Johnson; PF	Recruit ratings: Rivals: 247Sports: ESPN: (82)				
Ibrahima Traore; C	Bamako, Mali	West Oaks Academy	6 ft 9 in (2.06 m)	225 lb (102 kg)	Jul 8, 2024
Ibrahima Traore; C	Recruit ratings: 247Sports:				
David Katoa; SG	Salt Lake City, Utah	Utah Prep Academy	6 ft 4 in (1.93 m)	185 lb (84 kg)	Sep 26, 2022
David Katoa; SG	Recruit ratings: Rivals: 247Sports: ESPN: (79)				
Overall recruit ranking: Rivals: 59
Note: In many cases, Scout, Rivals, 247Sports, On3, and ESPN may conflict in their listings of height and weight.; In these cases, the average was taken. ESPN grades are on a 100-point scale.; Sources: "2024 Utah Basketball Commitment List". Rivals.; "Utah Utes 2024 Player Commits". ESPN.; "2024 Team Ranking". Rivals.

== Preseason ==
Big 12 Preseason Poll

	Big 12 Coaches	Points
1.	Kansas	215 (9)
2.	Houston	211 (5)
3.	Iowa State	194 (1)
4.	Baylor	185
5.	Arizona	179 (1)
6.	Cincinnati	140
7.	Texas Tech	135
8.	Kansas State	133
9.	BYU	116
10.	TCU	90
11.	UCF	83
12.	Arizona State	64
13.	West Virginia	62
14.	Oklahoma State	46
15.	Colorado	37
16.	Utah	30
Reference: (#) first-place votes

Pre-Season All-Big 12 Team

First Team

Player	School
Caleb Love	Arizona
LJ Cryer	Houston
J’Wan Roberts	Houston
Tamin Lipsey	Iowa State
Hunter Dickinson†	Kansas
† denotes unanimous selection Reference:

Second Team

Player	School
Norchad Omier	Baylor
Jeremy Roach	Baylor
Keshon Gilbert	Iowa State
Dajuan Harris Jr	Kansas
Coleman Hawkins	Kansas State
† denotes unanimous selection Reference:

- Player of the Year: Hunter Dickinson, Kansas
- Co-Newcomer of the Year: Jeremy Roach, Baylor & Coleman Hawkins, Kansas State
- Freshman of the Year: V. J. Edgecombe, Baylor

== Roster ==
2024–25 Utah Utes men's basketball team
Players
Coaches

Pos.	#	Name	Height	Weight	Year	Previous school	Hometown
G	0	Hunter Erickson	6 ft 3 in (1.91 m)	198 lb (90 kg)	GS	Salt Lake CC	Provo, UT
G	1	Miro Little	6 ft 3 in (1.91 m)	194 lb (88 kg)	So	Baylor	Tampere, Finland
F	2	Ezra Ausar	6 ft 8 in (2.03 m)	242 lb (110 kg)	Jr	East Carolina	Atlanta, GA
G	3	Jayden Teat (W)	6 ft 2 in (1.88 m)	170 lb (77 kg)	So	Capital Christian HS	Sacramento, CA
C	5	Joul Karram	6 ft 10 in (2.08 m)	222 lb (101 kg)	Fr	Hapoel Tel Aviv B.C.	Nazareth, Israel
G	6	Brady Smith	6 ft 1 in (1.85 m)	173 lb (78 kg)	So	Salt Lake CC	Logan, UT
F	8	Keanu Dawes	6 ft 9 in (2.06 m)	218 lb (99 kg)	So	Rice	Houston, TX
G	9	Jerry Huang (W)	6 ft 2 in (1.88 m)	187 lb (85 kg)	RS Fr	Wasatch Academy	Taipei, Taiwan
F	10	Jake Wahlin	6 ft 10 in (2.08 m)	211 lb (96 kg)	So	Timpview HS	Provo, UT
F	11	Caleb Lohner	6 ft 8 in (2.03 m)	235 lb (107 kg)	GS	Baylor	Flower Mound, TX
G	14	Brandon Haddock (W)	6 ft 1 in (1.85 m)	183 lb (83 kg)	Sr	Carroll HS	Southlake, TX
F	32	Ayomide Bamisile (W)	6 ft 7 in (2.01 m)	206 lb (93 kg)	RS Fr	Montverde Academy	Lagos, Nigeria
G	25	Mike Sharavjamts	6 ft 9 in (2.06 m)	190 lb (86 kg)	Jr	San Francisco	Ulaanbaatar, Mongolia
F	31	Ibi Traore	6 ft 9 in (2.06 m)	219 lb (99 kg)	Fr	West Oaks Academy	Bamako, Mali
F	32	Zach Keller	6 ft 10 in (2.08 m)	234 lb (106 kg)	Jr	Wake Forest	Highlands Ranch, CO
C	34	Lawson Lovering	7 ft 1 in (2.16 m)	233 lb (106 kg)	Jr	Colorado	Cheyenne, WY
G	45	Mason Madsen	6 ft 4 in (1.93 m)	193 lb (88 kg)	GS	Boston College	Rochester, MN
G	55	Gabe Madsen	6 ft 6 in (1.98 m)	202 lb (92 kg)	Sr	Cincinnati	Rochester, MN

Head coach

- Josh Eilert (West Virginia)

Assistant coach(es)

- David Evans (Real Salt Lake Academy)
- Lo Heath (Sacramento State)
- Tyler Larson (South Dakota)
- Jayden Olson (Williston State)

Legend

- (C) Team captain
- (S) Suspended
- (I) Ineligible
- (W) Walk-on
- Injured
- Current redshirt

Roster
Last update: February 24, 2025

== Schedule ==
Date time, TV	Rank^{#}	Opponent^{#}	Result	Record	High points	High rebounds	High assists	Site (attendance) city, state
Exhibition
October 29, 2024*; 7:00 p.m.		CSU Pueblo	W 98–67	–	17 – Erickson	7 – Lovering	9 – Little	Jon M. Huntsman Center (801); Salt Lake City, UT
Non-conference regular season
November 4, 2024*; 7:00 p.m., ESPN+		Alcorn State	W 100–59	1–0	27 – G. Madsen	7 – Wahlin	7 – Little	Jon M. Huntsman Center (6,785); Salt Lake City, UT
November 7, 2024*; 8:30 p.m., ESPN+		Central Arkansas	W 98–63	2–0	25 – G. Madsen	11 – Dawes	8 – Sharavjamts	Jon M. Huntsman Center (6,722); Salt Lake City, UT
November 12, 2024*; 7:00 p.m., ESPN+		Queens	W 96–65	3–0	24 – G. Madsen	11 – Ausar	5 – Sharavjamts	Jon M. Huntsman Center (6,757); Salt Lake City, UT
November 17, 2024*; 2:00 p.m., ESPN2		vs. Mississippi State; Mid-South Showdown	L 73–78	3–1	15 – Ausar	12 – Dawes	6 – Little	Landers Center; Southaven, MS
November 22, 2024*; 3:30 p.m., ESPN+		Utah Tech	W 84–53	4–1	19 – G. Madsen	11 – Little	8 – Little	Jon M. Huntsman Center (6,969); Salt Lake City, UT
November 26, 2024*; 7:00 p.m., ESPN+		Mississippi Valley State; Mountain to Sea Showcase	W 94–48	5–1	27 – G. Madsen	7 – Lovering	5 – Tied	Jon M. Huntsman Center (6,604); Salt Lake City, UT
November 30, 2024*; 3:00 p.m., ESPN+		Eastern Washington; Mountain to Sea Showcase	W 88–80	6–1	28 – G. Madsen	8 – Tied	7 – Little	Jon M. Huntsman Center (7,064); Salt Lake City, UT
December 7, 2024*; 5:00 p.m., ESPN+		Saint Mary's	L 63–72	6–2	15 – G. Madsen	10 – Little	6 – Little	Jon M. Huntsman Center (7,435); Salt Lake City, UT
December 14, 2024*; 5:00 p.m., ESPN+		Radford	W 81–63	7–2	18 – Erickson	5 – G. Madsen	7 – G. Madsen	Jon M. Huntsman Center (7,370); Salt Lake City, UT
December 17, 2024*; 7:00 p.m., ESPN+		Florida A&M	W 89–59	8–2	15 – Tied	5 – Tied	4 – Tied	Jon M. Huntsman Center (6,699); Salt Lake City, UT
December 21, 2024*; 4:00 p.m., BTN		vs. Iowa	L 88–95	8–3	26 – M. Madsen	6 – M. Madsen	5 – Sharavjamts	Sanford Pentagon (3,367); Sioux Falls, SD
Big 12 regular season
December 31, 2024; 12:00 p.m., ESPN+		at No. 25 Baylor	L 56–81	8–4 (0–1)	13 – Erickson	7 – Lohner	3 – Tied	Foster Pavilion (7,500); Waco, TX
January 4, 2025; 5:00 p.m., ESPN+		Texas Tech	L 65–93	8–5 (0–2)	12 – Keller	5 – Dawes	5 – Sharavjamts	Jon M. Huntsman Center (7,798); Salt Lake City, UT
January 7, 2025; 6:00 p.m., ESPN+		at No. 3 Iowa State	L 59–82	8–6 (0–3)	20 – G. Madsen	6 – Lovering	4 – Tied	Hilton Coliseum (13,496); Ames, IA
January 11, 2025; 5:00 p.m., ESPN+		Oklahoma State	W 83–62	9–6 (1–3)	21 – Ausar	9 – Dawes	6 – Lovering	Jon M. Huntsman Center (7,922); Salt Lake City, UT
January 15, 2025; 6:00 p.m., ESPN+		at TCU	W 73–65	10–6 (2–3)	17 – G. Madsen	11 – Wahlin	5 – G. Madsen	Schollmaier Arena (5,459); Fort Worth, TX
January 18, 2025; 7:00 p.m., ESPN+		BYU; Rivalry	W 73–72 ^{OT}	11–6 (3–3)	26 – Ausar	9 – Wahlin	4 – Lovering	Jon M. Huntsman Center (15,558); Salt Lake City, UT
January 22, 2025; 4:00 p.m., ESPN+		at No. 7 Houston	L 36–70	11–7 (3–4)	8 – G. Madsen	9 – Dawes	2 – Wahlin	Fertitta Center (7,035); Houston, TX
January 25, 2025; 2:30 p.m., ESPN2		Baylor	L 61–76	11–8 (3–5)	19 – Ausar	7 – Tied	7 – Little	Jon M. Huntsman Center (8,311); Salt Lake City, UT
January 28, 2025; 8:00 p.m., CBSSN		Cincinnati	W 69–66	12–8 (4–5)	11 – Ausar	6 – Wahlin	4 – Tied	Jon M. Huntsman Center (7,570); Salt Lake City, UT
February 1, 2025; 1:00 p.m., ESPN+		at Oklahoma State	L 72–81	12–9 (4–6)	18 – Ausar	5 – Tied	5 – Sharavjamts	Gallagher-Iba Arena (7,040); Stillwater, OK
February 5, 2025; 7:00 p.m., ESPN+		Colorado	W 72–59	13–9 (5–6)	17 – Madsen	7 – Ausar	3 – Tied	Jon M. Huntsman Center (7,581); Salt Lake City, UT
February 8, 2025; 3:00 p.m., ESPN+		at West Virginia	L 61–72	13–10 (5–7)	14 – Dawes	11 – Dawes	2 – Tied	WVU Coliseum (13,166); Morgantown, WV
February 11, 2025; 5:00 p.m., ESPN+		at Cincinnati	L 75–85	13–11 (5–8)	28 – G. Madsen	7 – Wahlin	4 – Lovering	Fifth Third Arena (10,510); Cincinnati, OH
February 15, 2025; 8:00 p.m., ESPN		No. 17 Kansas	W 74–67	14–11 (6–8)	24 – Madsen	12 – Wahlin	4 – Lovering	Jon M. Huntsman Center (11,056); Salt Lake City, UT
February 17, 2025; 9:00 p.m., ESPN2		Kansas State	W 74–69	15–11 (7–8)	21 – Ausar	10 – Lovering	4 – Little	Jon M. Huntsman Center (7,537); Salt Lake City, UT
February 23, 2025; 2:00 p.m., ESPN+		at UCF	L 72–76	15–12 (7–9)	23 – Madsen	6 – Tied	6 – Sharavjamts	Addition Financial Arena (6,379); Orlando, FL
February 26, 2025; 7:00 p.m., ESPN+		at No. 22 Arizona	L 66–83	15–13 (7–10)	18 – Tied	10 – Tied	7 – Madsen	McKale Center (14,264); Tucson, AZ
March 1, 2025; 5:00 p.m., ESPN+		Arizona State	W 99–73	16–13 (8–10)	25 – Ausar	11 – Dawes	6 – Sharavjamts	Jon M. Huntsman Center (8,780); Salt Lake City, UT
March 4, 2025; 7:00 p.m., ESPN+		West Virginia	L 69–71	16–14 (8–11)	23 – Madsen	6 – Tied	3 – Tied	Jon M. Huntsman Center (7,763); Salt Lake City, UT
March 8, 2025; 8:00 p.m., ESPNU		at No. 23 BYU; Rivalry	L 74–85	16–15 (8–12)	21 – Little	12 – Ausar	3 – Tied	Marriott Center (17,978); Provo, UT
Big 12 tournament
March 11, 2025; 7:30 p.m., ESPN+	(11)	vs. (14) UCF; First round	L 72–87	16–16	21 – Dawes	15 – Dawes	4 – Tied	T-Mobile Center (12,929); Kansas City, MO
College Basketball Crown
March 31, 2025*; 1:00 p.m., FS1		vs. Butler; First round	L 84–86	16–17	19 – Dawes	11 – Dawes	3 – Tied	MGM Grand Garden Arena (2,119); Paradise, NV
*Non-conference game. ^{#}Rankings from AP poll. (#) Tournament seedings in parentheses. All times are in Mountain Time.
