= Rayan Rupert =

French basketball player (born 2004)

No. 12 – Philadelphia 76ers
- Position: Shooting guard / small forward
- League: NBA

Personal information
- Born: 31 May 2004 (age 22) Strasbourg, France
- Listed height: 6 ft 7 in (2.01 m)
- Listed weight: 205 lb (93 kg)

Career information
- NBA draft: 2023: 2nd round, 43rd overall pick
- Drafted by: Portland Trail Blazers
- Playing career: 2019–present

Career history
- 2019–2021: Centre Fédéral
- 2021–2022: Pôle France
- 2022–2023: New Zealand Breakers
- 2023–2026: Portland Trail Blazers
- 2023–2025: →Rip City Remix
- 2026: Memphis Grizzlies
- 2026: →Memphis Hustle
- 2026–present: Philadelphia 76ers
- 2026–present: →Delaware Blue Coats
- Stats at NBA.com
- Stats at Basketball Reference
Medals
Men's basketball
Representing France
FIBA U16 European Championship
Silver medal – second place	2019 Italy	Team

Rayan Rupert (/ˈraɪ.ən ruːˈpɛər/ RYE-ən roo-PAIR; born 31 May 2004) is a French professional basketball player for the Philadelphia 76ers of the National Basketball Association (NBA), on a two-way contract with the Delaware Blue Coats of the NBA G League. He previously played for the Portland Trail Blazers.

== Early career ==
Rupert is a graduate of the INSEP Academy in France. He is of Martiniquais and Moroccan descent.

== Professional career ==
=== Centre Fédéral (2019–2021) ===
Between 2019 and 2021, Rupert played for Centre Fédéral in the French NM1.

=== Pôle France (2021–2022) ===
Rupert continued play in the NM1 in the 2021–22 season with Pôle France.

=== New Zealand Breakers (2022–2023) ===
On 10 June 2022, Rupert signed with the New Zealand Breakers for the 2022–23 NBL season as part of the league's Next Stars program. The Breakers had previously seen fellow Frenchmen Hugo Besson and Ousmane Dieng selected in the 2022 NBA draft.

=== Portland Trail Blazers (2023–2026) ===
Rupert was selected by the Portland Trail Blazers in the second round of the 2023 NBA draft with the 43rd overall pick and on 4 July 2023, he signed with the Blazers. Rupert made 39 appearances (including 12 starts) for Portland during his rookie campaign, recording averages of 4.0 points, 2.4 rebounds, and 1.6 assists.

Throughout his rookie and sophomore seasons, he was often assigned to the Rip City Remix. Rupert made 52 appearances for the Trail Blazers during the 2024–25 NBA season, averaging 3.0 points, 1.3 rebounds, and 0.5 assists.

Rupert played in 48 games for Portland during the 2025–26 season, recording averages of 2.9 points, 1.8 rebounds, and 0.7 assists. Rupert was waived by the Blazers on February 20, 2026.

=== Memphis Grizzlies (2026) ===
On 22 February 2026, Rupert was signed to a 10-day contract by the Memphis Grizzlies. On 4 March, following the expiration of his 10-day deal, Memphis signed Rupert to a two-way contract. On 5 April, Rupert recorded his first career triple-double, compiling 33 points, 10 rebounds, and 10 assists (all career-highs) as the Grizzlies lost to the Milwaukee Bucks, 115–131. He appeared in 16 games (including eight starts) for Memphis, averaging career-highs in points (12.2), rebounds (6.4), and assists (2.1).

=== Philadelphia 76ers (2026–present) ===
On July 8, 2026, Rupert signed a two-way contract with the Philadelphia 76ers.

== Career statistics ==
Legend
GP	Games played	GS	Games started	MPG	Minutes per game
FG%	Field goal percentage	3P%	3-point field goal percentage	FT%	Free throw percentage
RPG	Rebounds per game	APG	Assists per game	SPG	Steals per game
BPG	Blocks per game	PPG	Points per game	**Bold**	Career high

=== NBA ===
Year	Team	GP	GS	MPG	FG%	3P%	FT%	RPG	APG	SPG	BPG	PPG
2023–24	Portland	39	**12**	16.2	.335	**.359**	.760	2.4	1.6	.3	.1	4.0
2024–25	Portland	**52**	0	8.8	.408	.271	.767	1.3	.5	.3	.1	3.0
2025–26	Portland	48	0	12.0	.361	.310	.643	1.8	.7	.6	.0	2.9
2025–26	Memphis	16	8	**30.9**	**.422**	.338	**.825**	**6.4**	**2.1**	**1.6**	**.4**	**12.2**
Career		155	20	14.0	.381	.322	.771	2.3	1.0	.5	.1	4.1

== Personal life ==
Rupert's father, Thierry, was a EuroLeague player and captain of the French national team while his sister, Iliana, was the 12th overall pick in the 2021 WNBA draft. His cousin, Kameron Jones, a cancer survivor, is a chemistry major at UMBC.

Rupert and fellow NBA player Adama Bal grew up together in France as childhood best friends; the two later became teammates on the Memphis Grizzlies during the 2025–26 NBA season.
