= Cam Spencer =

American basketball player (born 2000)

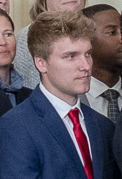
- Spencer in 2024

No. 24 – Memphis Grizzlies
- Position: Point guard / shooting guard
- League: NBA

Personal information
- Born: April 6, 2000 (age 26) Davidsonville, Maryland, U.S.
- Listed height: 6 ft 3 in (1.91 m)
- Listed weight: 205 lb (93 kg)

Career information
- High school: St. Paul's School for Boys
- College: Loyola (Maryland) (2019–2022); Rutgers (2022–2023); UConn (2023–2024)
- NBA draft: 2024: 2nd round, 53rd overall pick
- Drafted by: Detroit Pistons
- Playing career: 2024–present

Career history
- 2024–present: Memphis Grizzlies
- 2024–2025: →Memphis Hustle

Career highlights
- NCAA champion (2024); First-team All-Big East (2024); First-team All-Patriot League (2022); First-team Academic All-American (2024)
- Stats at NBA.com
- Stats at Basketball Reference

Cameron Spencer (born April 6, 2000) is an American professional basketball player for the Memphis Grizzlies of the National Basketball Association (NBA). He played college basketball for the Loyola Greyhounds, the Rutgers Scarlet Knights, and the UConn Huskies.

== Early life ==
Spencer grew up in Davidsonville, Maryland, and attended the Boys Latin School of Maryland. He was named the Maryland Interscholastic Athletic Association (MIAA) Player of the Year as a senior after he averaged 25 points, seven rebounds, and 4.5 assists per game.

== College career ==
Spencer began his college basketball career with the Loyola Greyhounds. He averaged ten points, 3.1 assists, and 3.4 rebounds in 23 games before suffering a hip injury and was named to the Patriot League All-Freshman team. Spencer missed most of his sophomore season while recovering from his hip injury. He returned for the final five games of the season and averaged 10.2 points. Spencer was named first-team All-Patriot League as a junior after averaging 18.9 points, 4.8 rebounds, 3.2 assists, and 2.3 steals per game. Following the end of the season, Spencer entered the NCAA transfer portal.

Spencer ultimately transferred to Rutgers after also receiving interest from Minnesota and NC State. He entered the 2022–23 as a starting guard for the Scarlet Knights. Spencer scored 14 points on 6-of-8 shooting, including a go-ahead three-point shot with 13.3 seconds left, in Rutgers' 65–64 upset win over top-ranked Purdue. Spencer was named the Big Ten Conference Player of the Week after scored another go-ahead three pointer with 15 seconds left and scored 23 points overall in a 65–62 win against Northwestern on January 11, 2023, and scored 21 points with six rebounds, six assists, and four steals as Rutgers beat Ohio State 68–64. He finished the season averaging 13.2 points, 3.8 rebounds, 3.1 assists, and two steals per game. After the season, Spencer decided to utilize the extra year of eligibility granted to college athletes who played in the 2020 season due to the COVID-19 pandemic and entered the NCAA transfer portal for a second time.

Spencer transferred to UConn. He was named first-team All-Big East Conference after starting all 40 of the Huskies' games and averaging 14.3 points, 4.9 rebounds, 3.6 assists, and 1.5 steals per game as UConn won the national championship Spencer scored 11 points with eight rebounds, two assists, and two steals in UConn's 75–60 win over Purdue in the National Championship game.

== Professional career ==
On June 27, 2024, Spencer was selected in the second round with the 53rd overall pick by the Detroit Pistons in the 2024 NBA draft. However, on draft night he was traded to the Memphis Grizzlies. On July 8, he signed a two-way contract with the Grizzlies. On December 2, while playing for the Memphis Hustle of the NBA G League, Spencer scored 51 points, including 12 three–pointers made. On January 10, 2025, Spencer suffered a fractured left thumb that necessitated surgery, and was ruled out for at least three weeks. He made 25 appearances (one start) for Memphis during the 2024–25 NBA season, averaging 4.2 points, 1.2 rebounds, and 1.4 assists.

On June 30, 2025, Spencer re-signed with the Grizzlies on a two-year, $4.5 million contract; the deal was later restructured to a four-year, $10.5 million contract on July 16.

On December 15, 2025, Spencer had his best offensive outing with 27 points and 6 assists on 7/10 shooting from behind the arc, rallying the Grizzlies to an 121-103 blowout win over the Los Angeles Clippers.

== Career statistics ==
Legend
GP	Games played	GS	Games started	MPG	Minutes per game
FG%	Field goal percentage	3P%	3-point field goal percentage	FT%	Free throw percentage
RPG	Rebounds per game	APG	Assists per game	SPG	Steals per game
BPG	Blocks per game	PPG	Points per game	**Bold**	Career high
*	Led the league

=== NBA ===
Year	Team	GP	GS	MPG	FG%	3P%	FT%	RPG	APG	SPG	BPG	PPG
2024–25	Memphis	25	1	10.1	.415	.358	**1.000**	1.2	1.4	.4	.0	4.2
2025–26	Memphis	**72**	**20**	**23.8**	**.473**	**.449**	.940*	**2.5**	**5.6**	**.7**	**.2**	**11.1**
Career		97	21	20.3	.466	.437	.948	2.2	4.5	.6	.1	9.3

=== College ===
Year	Team	GP	GS	MPG	FG%	3P%	FT%	RPG	APG	SPG	BPG	PPG
2019–20	Loyola	23	9	28.0	**.491**	.436	.857	3.4	3.1	.3	.0	10.0
2020–21	Loyola	5	3	25.6	.425	**.467**	.769	4.4	3.0	1.0	.2	10.2
2021–22	Loyola	30	30	**36.9**	.468	.353	.858	4.8	3.2	**2.3**	.2	**18.9**
2022–23	Rutgers	34	34	31.5	.444	.434	.894	3.8	3.1	2.0	.1	13.2
2023–24	UConn	**40**	**40**	33.0	.484	.440	**.911**	**4.9**	**3.6**	1.5	**.3**	14.3
Career		132	116	32.3	.468	.417	.878	4.3	3.3	1.6	.2	14.2

== Personal life ==
Spencer's older brother, Pat, was a four-time All-American and won the Tewaaraton Award as a lacrosse player at Loyola before playing a season of college basketball at Northwestern. Pat now plays basketball professionally for the Phoenix Suns of the National Basketball Association.
