= 2024–25 West Virginia Mountaineers men's basketball team =

American college basketball season

2024–25 West Virginia Mountaineers men's basketball
- Conference: Big 12 Conference
- Record: 19–13 (10–10 Big 12)
- Head coach: Darian DeVries (1st season)
- Associate head coach: Chester Frazier
- Assistant coaches: Tom Ostrom; Kory Barnett; Nick Norton; Cavel Witter
- Home arena: WVU Coliseum

2024–25 Big 12 men's basketball standings
	Conf.				Overall
Team	W		L	PCT	W		L	PCT
No. 2 Houston †	19	–	1	.950	35	–	5	.875
No. 8 Texas Tech	15	–	5	.750	28	–	9	.757
No. 15 Arizona	14	–	6	.700	24	–	13	.649
No. 13 BYU	14	–	6	.700	26	–	10	.722
No. 17 Iowa State	13	–	7	.650	25	–	10	.714
Kansas	11	–	9	.550	21	–	13	.618
Baylor	10	–	10	.500	20	–	15	.571
West Virginia	10	–	10	.500	19	–	13	.594
TCU	9	–	11	.450	16	–	16	.500
Kansas State	9	–	11	.450	16	–	17	.485
Utah	8	–	12	.400	16	–	17	.485
Oklahoma State	7	–	13	.350	17	–	18	.486
Cincinnati	7	–	13	.350	19	–	16	.543
UCF	7	–	13	.350	20	–	17	.541
Arizona State	4	–	16	.200	13	–	20	.394
Colorado	3	–	17	.150	14	–	21	.400
† 2025 Big 12 tournament winner Rankings from AP poll

The 2024–25 West Virginia Mountaineers men's basketball team represented West Virginia University during the 2024–25 NCAA Division I men's basketball season. The Mountaineers were coached by Darian DeVries in his first and only season in Morgantown, and played their home games at the WVU Coliseum located in Morgantown, West Virginia as members of the Big 12 Conference. Despite improving upon their 9–23 record from the previous season, the Mountaineers failed to qualify for the NCAA tournament for the second consecutive season.

After one season at the helm, DeVries would depart the West Virginia program to become head coach at Indiana.

== Previous season ==
The Mountaineers finished the 2023–24 season 9–23, 4–14 in Big 12 Play to finish in a tie for last place. They lost in the first round of the Big 12 tournament to Cincinnati.

=== Departures ===
Name	Pos.	Number	Height	Weight	Previous School	Hometown	Reason for Leaving
Noah Farrakhan	1	G	6'2"	165	Junior	Hillside, NJ	Transferred to Hampton
Kobe Johnson	2	G	6'3"	210	Junior	Canton, OH	Transferred to Saint Louis
Kerr Kriisa	3	G	6'3"	190	Senior	Tartu, Estonia	Transferred to Kentucky
Jeremiah Bembry	5	F	6'5"	185	(redshirt) Freshman	Brooklyn, NY	Transferred Oakland
Jesse Edwards	7	C	6'11"	230	GS Senior	Amsterdam, Netherlands	Graduated/undrafted in 2024 NBA draft; signed with the Minnesota Timberwolves
Quinn Slazinski	11	F	6'9"	215	GS Senior	Houston, TX	Graduated
Akok Akok	13	F	6'10"	225	GS Senior	Manchester, MH	Graduated
Seth Wilson	14	G	6'2"	215	Junior	Lorain, OH	Transferred to Akron
RaeQuan Battle	21	G	6'5"	190	Senior	Tulalip, WA	Graduated
Josiah Harris	22	F	6'7"	200	Sophomore	Canton, OH	Transferred to Akron
Patrick Suemnick	24	F	6'8"	230	Junior	Green Bay, WI	Transferred to Oklahoma State

=== Incoming transfers ===
Name	Number	Pos.	Height	Weight	Year	Hometown	Previous School
Eduardo Andre	0	C	6'11"	248	GS Senior	London, England	Fresno State
Jake Auer	8	G	6'0"	178	GS Senior	Clive, IA	Rockhurst
Tucker DeVries	12	G/F	6'7"	210	Senior	Waukee, IA	Drake
Amani Hansberry	13	F/C	6'8"	225	Sophomore	Silver Spring, MD	Illinois
Sencire Harris	10	G	6'4"	160	(redshirt) Sophomore	North Canton, OH	Illinois
Toby Okani	5	G	6'8"	210	GS Senior	Orange, NJ	UIC
Javon Small	7	G	6'3"	195	Senior	South Bend, IN	Oklahoma State
Jayden Stone	14	G	6'4"	200	GS Senior	Perth, Australia	Detroit Mercy
Joseph Yesufu	1	G	6'0"	185	GS Senior	Bolingbrook, IL	Washington State

=== Recruiting classes ===
==== 2024 recruiting class ====
College recruiting information
Name	Hometown	School	Height	Weight	Commit date
Jonathan Powell #21 SF	Centerville, OH	Centerville High School	6 ft 4 in (1.93 m)	180 lb (82 kg)	May 6, 2024
Jonathan Powell #21 SF	Recruit ratings: Rivals: 247Sports: ESPN: (81)				
Emerson Tenner #57 PG	Cordova, TN	Cordova High School	5 ft 10 in (1.78 m)	N/A	Apr 4, 2024
Emerson Tenner #57 PG	Recruit ratings: Rivals: 247Sports: ESPN: (79)				
Overall recruit ranking:
Note: In many cases, Scout, Rivals, 247Sports, On3, and ESPN may conflict in their listings of height and weight.; In these cases, the average was taken. ESPN grades are on a 100-point scale.; Sources: "2024 Team Ranking". Rivals.

== Preseason ==
Big 12 Preseason Poll

	Big 12 Coaches	Points
1.	Kansas	215 (9)
2.	Houston	211 (5)
3.	Iowa State	194 (1)
4.	Baylor	185
5.	Arizona	179 (1)
6.	Cincinnati	140
7.	Texas Tech	135
8.	Kansas State	133
9.	BYU	116
10.	TCU	90
11.	UCF	83
12.	Arizona State	64
13.	West Virginia	62
14.	Oklahoma State	46
15.	Colorado	37
16.	Utah	30
Reference: (#) first-place votes

Pre-Season All-Big 12 Team

First Team

Player	School
Caleb Love	Arizona
LJ Cryer	Houston
J’Wan Roberts	Houston
Tamin Lipsey	Iowa State
Hunter Dickinson†	Kansas
† denotes unanimous selection Reference:

Second Team

Player	School
Norchad Omier	Baylor
Jeremy Roach	Baylor
Keshon Gilbert	Iowa State
Dajuan Harris Jr.	Kansas
Coleman Hawkins	Kansas State
† denotes unanimous selection Reference:

- Player of the Year: Hunter Dickinson, Kansas
- Co-Newcomer of the Year: Jeremy Roach, Baylor & Coleman Hawkins, Kansas State
- Freshman of the Year: V. J. Edgecombe, Baylor

== Roster ==
2024–25 West Virginia Mountaineers men's basketball team
Players
Coaches

Pos.	#	Name	Height	Weight	Year	Previous school	Hometown
C	0	Eduardo Andre	6 ft 11 in (2.11 m)	240 lb (109 kg)	GS	Fresno State	London, England
G	1	Joseph Yesufu	6 ft 0 in (1.83 m)	190 lb (86 kg)	GS	Washington State	Bolingbrook, IL
G	2	Dylan Jay (W)	6 ft 4 in (1.93 m)	197 lb (89 kg)	Fr	Phhoenix PHH Prep	Chelan, WA
G	3	KJ Tenner	6 ft 0 in (1.83 m)	166 lb (75 kg)	Fr	Cordova HS	Memphis, TN
G	4	Aden Tagaloa-Nelson (W)	6 ft 1 in (1.85 m)	197 lb (89 kg)	So	Woodford County HS	Lexington, KY
G	5	Toby Okani	6 ft 8 in (2.03 m)	210 lb (95 kg)	GS	UIC	Orange, NJ
G	7	Javon Small	6 ft 3 in (1.91 m)	190 lb (86 kg)	Sr	Oklahoma State	South Bend, IN
G	8	Jake Auer (W)	6 ft 0 in (1.83 m)	195 lb (88 kg)	GS	Rockhurst	Clive, IA
F	9	Ofri Naveh	6 ft 7 in (2.01 m)	185 lb (84 kg)	So	Maccabi Tel Aviv B.C.	Neot Golan, Israel
G	10	Sencire Harris	6 ft 4 in (1.93 m)	174 lb (79 kg)	So	Illinois	Canton, OH
G	11	Jonathan Powell	6 ft 6 in (1.98 m)	191 lb (87 kg)	Fr	Centerville HS	Centerville, OH
G/F	12	Tucker DeVries	6 ft 7 in (2.01 m)	220 lb (100 kg)	Sr	Drake	Waukee, IA
F	13	Amani Hansberry	6 ft 8 in (2.03 m)	240 lb (109 kg)	So	Illinois	Silver Spring, MD
G	14	Jayden Stone	6 ft 4 in (1.93 m)	185 lb (84 kg)	Sr	Detroit Mercy	Perth, Australia
C	15	Abraham Oyeadier	6 ft 9 in (2.06 m)	221 lb (100 kg)	Fr	AOSS Prep	Accra, Ghana
F	22	Haris Elezovic	6 ft 8 in (2.03 m)	235 lb (107 kg)	Sr	Laval	Sherbrooke, Quebec

Head coach

- Darian DeVries (Northern Iowa)

Assistant coach(es)

- Chester Frazier (Illinois)
- Tom Ostrom (Minnesota)
- Kory Barnett (Indiana)
- Nick Norton (Drake)
- Cavel Witter (Creighton)

Legend

- (C) Team captain
- (S) Suspended
- (I) Ineligible
- (W) Walk-on
- Injured
- Current redshirt

Roster

== Schedule and results ==
Date time, TV	Rank^{#}	Opponent^{#}	Result	Record	High points	High rebounds	High assists	Site (attendance) city, state
Exhibition
October 18, 2024*; 7:00 p.m., ESPN+		Charleston	W 94–61	–	18 – DeVries	8 – Andre	4 – DeVries	WVU Coliseum (9,636); Morgantown, WV
Non-conference regular season
November 4, 2024*; 7:00 p.m., ESPN+		Robert Morris	W 87–59	1–0	18 – DeVries	12 – Hansberry	5 – Small	WVU Coliseum (9,229); Morgantown, WV
November 8, 2024*; 7:00 p.m., ESPN+		UMass	W 75–69	2–0	17 – DeVries	8 – DeVries	4 – Small	WVU Coliseum (10,017); Morgantown, WV
November 15, 2024*; 8:00 p.m., ACCNX/ESPN+		at Pittsburgh; Backyard Brawl	L 62–86	2–1	16 – Powell	6 – Harris	2 – Tied	Petersen Events Center (10,882); Pittsburgh, PA
November 20, 2024*; 7:00 p.m., ESPN+		Iona	W 86–43	3–1	23 – Small	9 – Hansberry	5 – Small	WVU Coliseum (8,591); Morgantown, WV
November 27, 2024*; 2:30 p.m., ESPN		vs. No. 3 Gonzaga; Battle 4 Atlantis quarterfinals	W 86–78 ^{OT}	4–1	31 – Small	8 – Hansberry	4 – DeVries	Imperial Arena (959); Paradise Island, Bahamas
November 28, 2024*; 2:00 p.m., ESPN2		vs. Louisville; Battle 4 Atlantis semifinals	L 70–79 ^{OT}	4–2	26 – Small	7 – Small	7 – Small	Imperial Arena (767); Paradise Island, Bahamas
November 29, 2024*; 3:00 p.m., ESPN2		vs. No. 24 Arizona; Battle 4 Atlantis 3rd place game	W 83–76 ^{OT}	5–2	26 – DeVries	6 – Hansberry	8 – Small	Imperial Arena (796); Paradise Island, Bahamas
December 6, 2024*; 7:00 p.m., ESPN2		Georgetown; Big East–Big 12 Battle	W 73–60	6–2	26 – Small	9 – Harris	4 – Harris	WVU Coliseum (11,522); Morgantown, WV
December 10, 2024*; 7:00 p.m., ESPN+		North Carolina Central	W 79–45	7–2	17 – Powell	12 – Hansberry	6 – Tenner	WVU Coliseum (8,711); Morgantown, WV
December 14, 2024*; 5:00 p.m., ESPN+		Bethune–Cookman	W 84–61	8–2	27 – Small	7 – Harris	6 – Small	WVU Coliseum (9,651); Morgantown, WV
December 22, 2024*; 2:00 p.m., ESPN+		Mercyhurst	W 67–46	9–2	19 – Small	12 – Okani	7 – Small	WVU Coliseum (10,777); Morgantown, WV
Big 12 regular season
December 31, 2024; 2:00 p.m., ESPN+		at No. 7 Kansas	W 62–61	10–2 (1–0)	15 – Andre	11 – Small	6 – Small	Allen Fieldhouse (15,300); Lawrence, KS
January 4, 2025; 12:00 p.m., CBSSN		Oklahoma State	W 69–50	11–2 (2–0)	24 – Small	11 – Small	4 – Tied	WVU Coliseum (11,753); Morgantown, WV
January 7, 2025; 7:00 p.m., ESPN+	No. 21	Arizona	L 56–75	11–3 (2–1)	17 – Small	6 – Small	6 – Small	WVU Coliseum (10,566); Morgantown, WV
January 12, 2025; 3:00 p.m., ESPN+	No. 21	at Colorado	W 78–70	12–3 (3–1)	26 – Small	5 – Harris	7 – Small	CU Events Center (6,975); Boulder, CO
January 15, 2025; 8:00 p.m., ESPN+		at No. 10 Houston	L 54–70	12–4 (3–2)	16 – Hansberry	5 – Okani	8 – Small	Fertitta Center (7,035); Houston, TX
January 18, 2025; 5:00 p.m., ESPN+		No. 2 Iowa State	W 64–57	13–4 (4–2)	27 – Small	7 – Small	5 – Small	WVU Coliseum (14,444); Morgantown, WV
January 21, 2025; 9:00 p.m., CBSSN	No. 23	Arizona State	L 57–65	13–5 (4–3)	14 – Small	5 – Hansberry	6 – Tenner	WVU Coliseum (10,528); Morgantown, WV
January 25, 2025; 6:00 p.m., CBSSN	No. 23	at Kansas State	L 60–73	13–6 (4–4)	22 – Small	9 – Harris	5 – Small	Bramlage Coliseum (9,018); Manhattan, KS
January 29, 2025; 7:00 p.m., ESPN+		No. 6 Houston	L 49–63	13–7 (4–5)	9 – Yesufu	5 – Hansberry	5 – Okani	WVU Coliseum (12,083); Morgantown, WV
February 2, 2025; 2:00 p.m., ESPN+		at Cincinnati; Rivalry	W 63–50	14–7 (5–5)	19 – Small	11 – Hansberry	9 – Small	Fifth Third Arena (11,085); Cincinnati, OH
February 5, 2025; 8:00 p.m., ESPN+		at TCU	L 60–65	14–8 (5–6)	17 – Small	8 – Hansberry	7 – Small	Schollmaier Arena (4,878); Fort Worth, TX
February 8, 2025; 5:00 p.m., ESPN+		Utah	W 72–61	15–8 (6–6)	17 – Hansberry	7 – Tied	8 – Small	WVU Coliseum (13,166); Morgantown, WV
February 11, 2025; 7:00 p.m., CBSSN		BYU	L 69–73	15–9 (6–7)	16 – Okani	– Tied	9 – Small	WVU Coliseum (10,879); Morgantown, WV
February 15, 2025; 2:00 p.m., ESPN2		at Baylor	L 71–74 ^{OT}	15–10 (6–8)	22 – Small	9 – Powell	6 – Small	Foster Pavilion (7,500); Waco, TX
February 19, 2025; 7:00 p.m., ESPN2		Cincinnati; Rivalry	W 62–59	16–10 (7–8)	17 – Hansberry	13 – Hansberry	4 – Small	WVU Coliseum (10,683); Morgantown, WV
February 22, 2025; 1:00 p.m., ESPN+		at No. 9 Texas Tech	L 51–73	16–11 (7–9)	14 – Hansberry	11 – Hansberry	5 – Small	United Supermarkets Arena (14,466); Lubbock, TX
February 25, 2025; 9:00 p.m., ESPN+		TCU	W 73–55	17–11 (8–9)	23 – Small	6 – Yesufu	10 – Small	WVU Coliseum (10,167); Morgantown, WV
March 1, 2025; 10:00 p.m., ESPN2		at No. 25 BYU	L 56–77	17–12 (8–10)	15 – Small	6 – Hansberry	2 – Tied	Marriott Center (17,978); Provo, UT
March 4, 2025; 9:00 p.m., ESPN+		at Utah	W 71–69	18–12 (9–10)	18 – Small	6 – Hansberry	7 – Small	Jon M. Huntsman Center (7,763); Salt Lake City, UT
March 8, 2025; 5:00 p.m., ESPN+		UCF	W 72–65	19–12 (10–10)	25 – Small	10 – Hansberry	9 – Small	WVU Coliseum (12,523); Morgantown, WV
Big 12 tournament
March 12, 2025; 3:00 p.m, ESPN+	(8)	vs. (16) Colorado; Second round	L 60–67	19–13	23 – Small	6 – Hansberry	5 – Small	T-Mobile Center (12,922); Kansas City, MO
*Non-conference game. ^{#}Rankings from AP Poll. (#) Tournament seedings in parentheses. All times are in Eastern Time.

== Rankings ==
Ranking movements Legend: ██ Increase in ranking ██ Decrease in ranking — = Not ranked RV = Received votes
	Week																				
Poll	Pre	1	2	3	4	5	6	7	8	9	10	11	12	13	14	15	16	17	18	19	Final
AP	—	—	—	—	RV	RV	RV	RV	RV	21	RV	23	RV	—	—	—	—	—	—	—	—
Coaches	—	—	—	—	RV	RV	RV	RV	RV	23	25	23	RV	RV	—	—	—	—	—	—	—

== See also ==
- 2024–25 West Virginia Mountaineers women's basketball team
