= 2025–26 Memphis Grizzlies season =

- Head coach: Tuomas Iisalo
- President: Jason Wexler
- General manager: Zach Kleiman
- Owner: Robert Pera
- Arena: FedExForum

Results
- Record: 25–57 (.305)
- Place: Division: 5th (Southwest); Conference: 13th (Western)
- Playoff finish: Did not qualify
- Stats at Basketball Reference

Local media
- Television: FanDuel Sports Network South; FanDuel Sports Network Southeast; Gray Media (Note: Affiliates include: WMC-TV/WMC-DT3 (Memphis); WSMV-TV/WSMV-DT2 (Nashville); WBXX-TV/WVLT-DT2 (Knoxville); KAIT-TV/KAIT-DT2 (Jonesboro); WBGS-DT3 (Bowling Green); WTVA-NBC/WTVA-ABC (Tupelo)) (7 simulcasts)
- Radio: WMFS-FM

The 2025–26 Memphis Grizzlies season was the 31st season of the franchise in the National Basketball Association (NBA) and 25th in Memphis. On May 2, 2025, the Grizzlies hired Tuomas Iisalo as their full-time head coach. Brandon Clarke was limited to just two regular season appearances in December 2025 before a severe right calf strain sidelined him for the remainder of the season. During their offseason, Clarke would die due to a likely accidental drug overdose on May 11, 2026.

On February 3, 2026, the Grizzlies traded Jaren Jackson Jr. to the Utah Jazz.

On February 23, they were unable to improve over their 48–34 record from the previous season with a loss to the Sacramento Kings. On March 24, Ja Morant was shut down for the remainder of the season due to a left elbow injury, after playing only 20 games due to injuries and a suspension. On March 25, they were eliminated from playoff contention for the second time in three seasons with a loss to the San Antonio Spurs. They would close the regular season with a 25–57 record, placing 13th in the West.

This would turn out to be the final season for Morant with the Memphis Grizzlies, as he would be traded to the Portland Trail Blazers in the following off-season.

== Draft ==
Round	Pick	Player	Position	Nationality	College / Club
1	16	Yang Hansen	C	China	Qingdao Eagles (China)
2	48	Javon Small	PG	United States	West Virginia
2	56	Will Richard	SG	United States	Florida

The Grizzlies entered the draft holding one first-round selection and two second-round selections, all acquired from previous trades. Picks Yang Hansen and Will Richard were later traded to the Portland Trail Blazers and Golden State Warriors, respectively.

== Roster ==
2025–26 Memphis Grizzlies roster
Players

Pos.	No.	Player	Height	Weight	DOB	From
F/C	7	Santi Aldama (injured)	7 ft 0 in (2.13 m)	215 lb (98 kg)	2001-01-10	Loyola (MD)
G	3	Kentavious Caldwell-Pope (injured)	6 ft 5 in (1.96 m)	204 lb (93 kg)	1993-02-18	Georgia
F	15	Brandon Clarke (injured)	6 ft 8 in (2.03 m)	215 lb (98 kg)	1996-09-19	Gonzaga
G	4	Walter Clayton Jr.	6 ft 4 in (1.93 m)	195 lb (88 kg)	2003-03-06	Florida
G	23	Cedric Coward	6 ft 6 in (1.98 m)	206 lb (93 kg)	2003-09-11	Washington State
C	14	Zach Edey (injured)	7 ft 3 in (2.21 m)	305 lb (138 kg)	2002-05-14	Purdue
F/C	67	Taj Gibson	6 ft 9 in (2.06 m)	232 lb (105 kg)	1985-06-24	USC
F	22	Taylor Hendricks	6 ft 9 in (2.06 m)	215 lb (98 kg)	2003-11-22	Central Florida
F	45	GG Jackson	6 ft 9 in (2.06 m)	210 lb (95 kg)	2004-12-17	South Carolina
G/F	2	Ty Jerome	6 ft 5 in (1.96 m)	195 lb (88 kg)	1997-07-08	Virginia
G	21	Jahmai Mashack (TW)	6 ft 4 in (1.93 m)	203 lb (92 kg)	2002-11-10	Tennessee
G	12	Ja Morant (injured)	6 ft 2 in (1.88 m)	174 lb (79 kg)	1999-08-10	Murray State
G	1	Scotty Pippen Jr. (injured)	6 ft 1 in (1.85 m)	170 lb (77 kg)	2000-11-10	Vanderbilt
F	18	Olivier-Maxence Prosper	6 ft 7 in (2.01 m)	230 lb (104 kg)	2002-07-03	Marquette
G/F	32	Rayan Rupert (TW)	6 ft 7 in (2.01 m)	205 lb (93 kg)	2004-05-21	France
G	10	Javon Small (injured) (TW)	6 ft 3 in (1.91 m)	190 lb (86 kg)	2002-12-19	West Virginia
G	24	Cam Spencer	6 ft 4 in (1.93 m)	205 lb (93 kg)	2000-04-06	Connecticut
F	0	Jaylen Wells (injured)	6 ft 8 in (2.03 m)	205 lb (93 kg)	2003-08-26	Washington State

Coaches
Head coach
- Tuomas Iisalo
Assistant(s)
- Darnell Lazare
- Jason March
- Ryan Saunders (lead assistant)
- Erick Schmidt

Legend
- (DP) Unsigned draft pick
- (FA) Free agent
- (S) Suspended
- (GL) On assignment to G League affiliate
- (TW) Two-way affiliate player
- Injured

Roster
Updated: April 12, 2026

== Standings ==
=== Division ===
Southwest Division	W	L	PCT	GB	Home	Road	Div	GP
y – San Antonio Spurs	62	20	.756	–	32‍–‍8	30‍–‍12	13‍–‍3	82
x – Houston Rockets	52	30	.634	10.0	30‍–‍11	22‍–‍19	10‍–‍6	82
New Orleans Pelicans	26	56	.317	36.0	17‍–‍24	9‍–‍32	7‍–‍9	82
Dallas Mavericks	26	56	.317	36.0	16‍–‍25	10‍–‍31	4‍–‍12	82
Memphis Grizzlies	25	57	.305	37.0	14‍–‍27	11‍–‍30	6‍–‍10	82

=== Conference ===
Western Conference
#	Team	W	L	PCT	GB	GP
1	z – Oklahoma City Thunder *	64	18	.780	–	82
2	y – San Antonio Spurs *	62	20	.756	2.0	82
3	x – Denver Nuggets	54	28	.659	10.0	82
4	y – Los Angeles Lakers *	53	29	.646	11.0	82
5	x – Houston Rockets	52	30	.634	12.0	82
6	x – Minnesota Timberwolves	49	33	.598	15.0	82
7	x – Phoenix Suns	45	37	.549	19.0	82
8	x – Portland Trail Blazers	42	40	.512	22.0	82
9	pi – Los Angeles Clippers	42	40	.512	22.0	82
10	pi – Golden State Warriors	37	45	.451	27.0	82
11	New Orleans Pelicans	26	56	.317	38.0	82
12	Dallas Mavericks	26	56	.317	38.0	82
13	Memphis Grizzlies	25	57	.305	39.0	82
14	Sacramento Kings	22	60	.268	42.0	82
15	Utah Jazz	22	60	.268	42.0	82

== Game log ==
=== Preseason ===
2025 preseason game log
Total: 1–4 (Home: 0–3; Road: 1–1)
Preseason: 1–4 (home: 0–3; road: 1–1)

Game	Date	Team	Score	High points	High rebounds	High assists	Location Attendance	Record
1	October 6	Detroit	L 112–128	Ty Jerome (16)	Aldama, Landale (7)	Caldwell-Pope, Jerome, Pippen Jr., Wells (3)	FedExForum; 12,517	0–1
2	October 8	Boston	L 103–121	Jaylen Wells (21)	John Konchar (7)	Javon Small (6)	FedExForum; 13,681	0–2
3	October 11	Atlanta	L 116–122	Coward, Wells (15)	Santi Aldama (10)	Javon Small (5)	FedExForum; 14,260	0–3
4	October 15	@ Charlotte	L 116–145	Javon Small (18)	Aldama, Konchar (6)	Javon Small (8)	First Horizon Coliseum; 12,559	0–4
5	October 17	@ Miami	W 141–125	Jaylen Wells (21)	PJ Hall (7)	Prosper, Small, Spencer (5)	Kaseya Center; 19,600	1–4

2025–26 preseason schedule

=== Regular season ===
2025–26 game log
Total: 25–57 (Home: 14–27; Road: 11–30)
October: 3–3 (home: 2–2; road: 1–1)

Game	Date	Team	Score	High points	High rebounds	High assists	Location Attendance	Record
1	October 22	New Orleans	W 128–122	Ja Morant (35)	Jaren Jackson Jr. (8)	Jaylen Wells (4)	FedExForum; 17,794	1–0
2	October 24	Miami	L 114–146	Jaren Jackson Jr. (19)	Santi Aldama (8)	Javon Small (8)	FedExForum; 14,461	1–1
3	October 25	Indiana	W 128–103	Cedric Coward (27)	Aldama, Landale (8)	Ja Morant (8)	FedExForum; 15,441	2–1
4	October 27	@ Golden State	L 118–131	Ja Morant (23)	Jaren Jackson Jr. (7)	Ja Morant (9)	Chase Center; 18,064	2–2
5	October 29	@ Phoenix	W 114–113	Ja Morant (28)	Santi Aldama (10)	Ja Morant (7)	Mortgage Matchup Center; 17,071	3–2
6	October 31	L.A. Lakers	L 112–117	Landale, Wells (16)	Aldama, Coward (10)	Ja Morant (7)	FedExForum; 16,122	3–3

November: 6–9 (home: 2–4; road: 4–5)

Game	Date	Team	Score	High points	High rebounds	High assists	Location Attendance	Record
7	November 2	@ Toronto	L 104–117	Jaren Jackson Jr. (20)	Jaren Jackson Jr. (9)	Cedric Coward (5)	Scotiabank Arena; 16,746	3–4
8	November 3	Detroit	L 106–114	Jaren Jackson Jr. (21)	Charles Bassey (10)	Ja Morant (10)	FedExForum; 13,822	3–5
9	November 5	Houston	L 109–124	Cam Spencer (19)	Cedric Coward (9)	Ja Morant (8)	FedExForum; 15,119	3–6
10	November 7	Dallas	W 118–104	Coward, Morant (21)	Cedric Coward (9)	Ja Morant (13)	FedExForum; 15,028	4–6
11	November 9	Oklahoma City	L 100–114	Jaren Jackson Jr. (17)	Cedric Coward (10)	Ja Morant (8)	FedExForum; 14,532	4–7
12	November 11	@ New York	L 120–133	Aldama, Jackson Jr. (19)	Vince Williams Jr. (9)	Ja Morant (10)	Madison Square Garden; 19,812	4–8
13	November 12	@ Boston	L 95–131	Jaren Jackson Jr. (18)	Aldama, Coward, Landale (6)	Aldama, Landale (4)	TD Garden; 19,156	4–9
14	November 15	@ Cleveland	L 100–108	Jaren Jackson Jr. (26)	Santi Aldama (11)	Vince Williams Jr. (4)	Rocket Arena; 19,432	4–10
15	November 18	@ San Antonio	L 101–111	Cedric Coward (19)	Coward, Edey (11)	Vince Williams Jr. (9)	Frost Bank Center; 18,354	4–11
16	November 20	Sacramento	W 137–96	Santi Aldama (29)	GG Jackson (9)	Vince Williams Jr. (15)	FedExForum; 14,704	5–11
17	November 22	@ Dallas	W 102–96	Santi Aldama (20)	Zach Edey (15)	Vince Williams Jr. (6)	American Airlines Center; 19,523	6–11
18	November 24	Denver	L 115–125	Jock Landale (26)	Jock Landale (10)	Vince Williams Jr. (7)	FedExForum; 15,519	6–12
19	November 26	@ New Orleans	W 133–128 (OT)	Jaren Jackson Jr. (27)	Zach Edey (15)	Vince Williams Jr. (17)	Smoothie King Center; 17,333	7–12
20	November 28	@ L.A. Clippers	W 112–107	Jaren Jackson Jr. (24)	Zach Edey (19)	Aldama, Williams Jr. (5)	Intuit Dome; 17,927	8–12
21	November 30	@ Sacramento	W 115–107	Zach Edey (32)	Zach Edey (17)	Vince Williams Jr. (7)	Golden 1 Center; 15,901	9–12

December: 6–6 (home: 3–3; road: 3–3)

Game	Date	Team	Score	High points	High rebounds	High assists	Location Attendance	Record
22	December 2	@ San Antonio	L 119–126	Cam Spencer (21)	Zach Edey (15)	Vince Williams Jr. (7)	Frost Bank Center; 18,354	9–13
23	December 5	L.A. Clippers	W 107–98	Cedric Coward (23)	Cedric Coward (14)	Cam Spencer (7)	FedExForum; 15,052	10–13
24	December 7	Portland	W 119–96	Santi Aldama (22)	Zach Edey (10)	Cam Spencer (6)	FedExForum; 14,189	11–13
25	December 12	Utah	L 126–130	Santi Aldama (22)	Cedric Coward (12)	Ja Morant (10)	FedExForum; 15,502	11–14
26	December 15	@ L.A. Clippers	W 121–103	Jaren Jackson Jr. (31)	Kentavious Caldwell-Pope (7)	Caldwell-Pope, Spencer (6)	Intuit Dome; 17,927	12–14
27	December 17	@ Minnesota	W 116–110	Jaren Jackson Jr. (28)	Jaren Jackson Jr. (12)	Vince Williams Jr. (4)	Target Center; 16,287	13–14
28	December 20	Washington	L 122–130	Santi Aldama (37)	Santi Aldama (10)	Cam Spencer (11)	FedExForum; 15,780	13–15
29	December 22	@ Oklahoma City	L 103–119	Caldwell-Pope, Coward (16)	Jock Landale (10)	Cam Spencer (8)	Paycom Center; 18,203	13–16
30	December 23	@ Utah	W 137–128	Santi Aldama (37)	GG Jackson (9)	Cam Spencer (13)	Delta Center; 18,186	14–16
31	December 26	Milwaukee	W 125–104	Jaren Jackson Jr. (24)	Jaren Jackson Jr. (9)	Ja Morant (10)	FedExForum; 16,617	15–16
32	December 28	@ Washington	L 112–116	Jaren Jackson Jr. (31)	Santi Aldama (10)	Morant, Spencer (7)	Capital One Arena; 16,681	15–17
33	December 30	Philadelphia	L 136–139 (OT)	Ja Morant (40)	Cedric Coward (16)	Cam Spencer (5)	FedExForum; 15,668	15–18

January: 3–11 (home: 3–6; road: 0–5)

Game	Date	Team	Score	High points	High rebounds	High assists	Location Attendance	Record
34	January 2	@ L.A. Lakers	L 121–128	Jaren Jackson Jr. (25)	Aldama, Coward (7)	Ja Morant (11)	Crypto.com Arena; 18,997	15–19
35	January 4	@ L.A. Lakers	L 114–120	Jaylen Wells (23)	Aldama, Landale (10)	Cam Spencer (9)	Crypto.com Arena; 18,997	15–20
36	January 6	San Antonio	W 106–105	Jackson Jr., Spencer (21)	Tied (9)	Cam Spencer (8)	FedExForum; 14,551	16–20
37	January 7	Phoenix	L 98–117	Jaren Jackson Jr. (19)	Jock Landale (8)	Javon Small (7)	FedExForum; 14,268	16–21
38	January 9	Oklahoma City	L 116–117	Jaren Jackson Jr. (23)	Jock Landale (10)	Cam Spencer (11)	FedExForum; 15,717	16–22
39	January 11	Brooklyn	W 103–98	Cedric Coward (21)	Jock Landale (9)	Cam Spencer (13)	FedExForum; 15,578	17–22
40	January 15	@ Orlando	L 111–118	Jaren Jackson Jr. (30)	John Konchar (8)	Cam Spencer (11)	(Germany) Uber Arena; 13,738	17–23
41	January 18	Orlando	W 126–109	Ja Morant (24)	Jock Landale (8)	Ja Morant (13)	(United Kingdom) The O_{2} Arena; 18,424	18–23
42	January 21	Atlanta	L 122–124	Ja Morant (23)	Jock Landale (11)	Ja Morant (12)	FedExForum; 15,054	18–24
43	January 23	New Orleans	L 127–133	Jaren Jackson Jr. (26)	Jaren Jackson Jr. (12)	Cam Spencer (11)	FedExForum; 14,174	18–25
—	January 25	Denver	Postponed due to the January 2026 North American winter storm. Makeup date March 18.					
44	January 26	@ Houston	L 99–108	Aldama, Jackson Jr. (17)	Vince Williams Jr. (8)	Cam Spencer (13)	Toyota Center; 18,055	18–26
45	January 28	Charlotte	L 97–112	Jaren Jackson Jr. (26)	John Konchar (6)	Cam Spencer (6)	FedExForum; 13,301	18–27
46	January 30	@ New Orleans	L 106–114	Jackson Jr., Spencer (16)	Jaren Jackson Jr. (9)	Coward, Jackson (5)	Smoothie King Center; 16,446	18–28
47	January 31	Minnesota	L 114–131	Ty Jerome (20)	Jock Landale (8)	Jerome, Small (6)	FedExForum; 15,372	18–29

February: 4–7 (home: 2–2; road: 2–5)

Game	Date	Team	Score	High points	High rebounds	High assists	Location Attendance	Record
48	February 2	Minnesota	W 137–128	Jaren Jackson Jr. (30)	GG Jackson (8)	Ty Jerome (8)	FedExForum; 14,005	19–29
49	February 4	@ Sacramento	W 129–125	Ty Jerome (28)	Coward, Jackson (7)	Ty Jerome (7)	Golden 1 Center; 15,017	20–29
50	February 6	@ Portland	L 115–135	Cam Spencer (18)	Cedric Coward (8)	Scotty Pippen Jr. (6)	Moda Center; 16,895	20–30
51	February 7	@ Portland	L 115–122	Olivier-Maxence Prosper (25)	GG Jackson (8)	Walter Clayton Jr. (7)	Moda Center; 16,273	20–31
52	February 9	@ Golden State	L 113–114	Ty Jerome (19)	Taylor Hendricks (10)	Ty Jerome (7)	Chase Center; 18,064	20–32
53	February 11	@ Denver	L 116–132	GG Jackson (21)	Jackson, Prosper (5)	Cam Spencer (9)	Ball Arena; 19,651	20–33
All-Star Game
54	February 20	Utah	W 123–114	Olivier-Maxence Prosper (23)	Lawson Lovering (11)	Cam Spencer (10)	FedExForum; 16,112	21–33
55	February 21	@ Miami	L 120–136	GG Jackson (28)	GG Jackson (9)	Clayton Jr., Pippen Jr. (6)	Kaseya Center; 19,700	21–34
56	February 23	Sacramento	L 114–123	Javon Small (21)	Rayan Rupert (9)	Javon Small (9)	FedExForum; 14,176	21–35
57	February 25	Golden State	L 112–133	GG Jackson (24)	GG Jackson (8)	Ty Jerome (5)	FedExForum; 15,689	21–36
58	February 27	@ Dallas	W 124–105	Cam Spencer (25)	Olivier-Maxence Prosper (10)	Clayton Jr., Small (5)	American Airlines Center; 19,165	22–36

March: 3–14 (home: 2–7; road: 1–7)

Game	Date	Team	Score	High points	High rebounds	High assists	Location Attendance	Record
59	March 1	@ Indiana	W 125–106	Taylor Hendricks (19)	GG Jackson (9)	Walter Clayton Jr. (14)	Gainbridge Fieldhouse; 16,695	23–36
60	March 3	@ Minnesota	L 110–117	Jaylen Wells (19)	GG Jackson (11)	Walter Clayton Jr. (9)	Target Center; 17,416	23–37
61	March 4	Portland	L 114–122	Jaylen Wells (24)	Olivier-Maxence Prosper (9)	Walter Clayton Jr. (8)	FedExForum; 14,661	23–38
62	March 7	L.A. Clippers	L 120–123	Ty Jerome (23)	Coward, Jackson (7)	Ty Jerome (7)	FedExForum; 16,037	23–39
63	March 9	@ Brooklyn	L 115–126	Rayan Rupert (20)	Rayan Rupert (8)	Cam Spencer (8)	Barclays Center; 16,543	23–40
64	March 10	@ Philadelphia	L 129–139	Ty Jerome (26)	Cedric Coward (16)	Ty Jerome (8)	Xfinity Mobile Arena; 17,897	23–41
65	March 12	Dallas	L 112–120	Jaylen Wells (23)	Taylor Hendricks (10)	Javon Small (9)	FedExForum; 15,029	23–42
66	March 13	@ Detroit	L 110–126	Javon Small (23)	DeJon Jarreau (7)	Cam Spencer (5)	Little Caesars Arena; 20,062	23–43
67	March 16	@ Chicago	L 107–132	Cedric Coward (17)	Tyler Burton (8)	Clayton Jr., Spencer (7)	United Center; 20,157	23–44
68	March 18	Denver	W 125–118	Ty Jerome (21)	Ty Jerome (9)	Ty Jerome (9)	FedExForum; 15,612	24–44
69	March 20	Boston	L 112–117	Tyler Burton (23)	Olivier-Maxence Prosper (7)	Ty Jerome (7)	FedExForum; 17,048	24–45
70	March 21	@ Charlotte	L 101–124	GG Jackson (19)	Prosper, Small (7)	Jarreau, Spencer (4)	Spectrum Center; 19,487	24–46
71	March 23	@ Atlanta	L 107–146	GG Jackson (26)	Tyler Burton (8)	Walter Clayton Jr. (6)	State Farm Arena; 16,131	24–47
72	March 25	San Antonio	L 98–123	GG Jackson (20)	Taylor Hendricks (8)	Cam Spencer (7)	FedExForum; 15,688	24–48
73	March 27	Houston	L 109–119	Olivier-Maxence Prosper (31)	Hendricks, Prosper (7)	Cam Spencer (10)	FedExForum; 15,715	24–49
74	March 28	Chicago	W 125–124	Cedric Coward (24)	Cedric Coward (9)	Walter Clayton Jr. (6)	FedExForum; 16,883	25–49
75	March 30	Phoenix	L 105–131	Tyler Burton (17)	DeJon Jarreau (8)	Walter Clayton Jr. (7)	FedExForum; 14,661	25–50

April: 0–7 (home: 0–3; road: 0–4)

Game	Date	Team	Score	High points	High rebounds	High assists	Location Attendance	Record
76	April 1	New York	L 119–130	GG Jackson (20)	Mashack, Prosper (4)	Cam Spencer (8)	FedExForum; 15,181	25–51
77	April 3	Toronto	L 96–128	GG Jackson (30)	Toby Okani (7)	Javon Small (4)	FedExForum; 17,023	25–52
78	April 5	@ Milwaukee	L 115–131	Rayan Rupert (33)	Rayan Rupert (10)	Rayan Rupert (10)	Fiserv Forum; 15,248	25–53
79	April 6	Cleveland	L 126–142	Olivier-Maxence Prosper (24)	Adama Bal (6)	Walter Clayton Jr. (11)	FedExForum; 16,511	25–54
80	April 8	@ Denver	L 119–136	Cedric Coward (27)	Dariq Whitehead (7)	Jahmai Mashack (7)	Ball Arena; 19,985	25–55
81	April 10	@ Utah	L 101–147	Dariq Whitehead (21)	Jahmai Mashack (15)	Jahmai Mashack (14)	Delta Center; 18,186	25–56
82	April 12	@ Houston	L 101–132	Dariq Whitehead (26)	Rayan Rupert (12)	Jahmai Mashack (11)	Toyota Center; 18,055	25–57

2025–26 season schedule

=== NBA Cup ===
==== West Group B ====
Pos	Team	Pld	W	L	PF	PA	PD	Qualification
1	Los Angeles Lakers	4	4	0	499	453	+46	Advanced to knockout rounds
2	Memphis Grizzlies	4	3	1	464	450	+14	
3	Los Angeles Clippers	4	2	2	465	485	−20	
4	Dallas Mavericks	4	1	3	455	476	−21	
5	New Orleans Pelicans	4	0	4	465	484	−19	

Source: NBA

== Player statistics ==
=== Regular season ===
Player	POS	GP	GS	MP	REB	AST	STL	BLK	PTS	MPG	RPG	APG	SPG	BPG	PPG
Cam Spencer	SG	72	20	1,714	183	400	52	11	798	23.8	2.5	5.6	.7	.2	11.1
Jaylen Wells	SG	69	69	1,821	220	111	61	9	865	26.4	3.2	1.6	.9	.1	12.5
Cedric Coward	SG	62	47	1,598	364	171	40	27	843	25.8	5.9	2.8	.6	.4	13.6
GG Jackson II	PF	55	28	1,178	235	81	31	44	686	21.4	4.3	1.5	.6	.8	12.5
Olivier-Maxence Prosper	PF	53	24	984	187	51	40	13	530	18.6	3.5	1.0	.8	.2	10.0
Kentavious Caldwell-Pope	SG	51	14	1,088	125	139	43	8	428	21.3	2.5	2.7	.8	.2	8.4
Jock Landale^{†}	C	45	25	1,060	292	75	25	22	509	23.6	6.5	1.7	.6	.5	11.3
Jaren Jackson Jr.^{†}	C	45	45	1,382	259	86	47	68	864	30.7	5.8	1.9	1.0	1.5	19.2
Santi Aldama	PF	43	11	1,198	287	126	37	31	602	27.9	6.7	2.9	.9	.7	14.0
Javon Small	PG	41	12	830	128	151	34	9	396	20.2	3.1	3.7	.8	.2	9.7
Vince Williams Jr.^{†}	PG	34	12	736	136	150	27	14	272	21.6	4.0	4.4	.8	.4	8.0
Jahmai Mashack	SG	31	7	673	81	69	37	14	192	21.7	2.6	2.2	1.2	.5	6.2
John Konchar^{†}	SG	30	1	435	92	40	31	13	95	14.5	3.1	1.3	1.0	.4	3.2
Taylor Hendricks^{†}	PF	26	11	626	122	31	37	22	275	24.1	4.7	1.2	1.4	.8	10.6
Walter Clayton Jr.^{†}	PG	24	6	599	51	136	20	7	232	25.0	2.1	5.7	.8	.3	9.7
Ja Morant	PG	20	20	569	65	161	20	6	389	28.5	3.3	8.1	1.0	.3	19.5
Rayan Rupert^{†}	SG	16	8	495	102	34	26	7	195	30.9	6.4	2.1	1.6	.4	12.2
Ty Jerome	SG	15	15	339	42	85	16	4	295	22.6	2.8	5.7	1.1	.3	19.7
Tyler Burton	SF	12	0	307	50	12	11	4	129	25.6	4.2	1.0	.9	.3	10.8
Zach Edey	C	11	11	284	122	12	7	21	150	25.8	11.1	1.1	.6	1.9	13.6
DeJon Jarreau	SG	11	0	231	51	36	10	8	88	21.0	4.6	3.3	.9	.7	8.0
Christian Koloko^{†}	C	11	2	195	44	10	10	13	29	17.7	4.0	.9	.9	1.2	2.6
Taj Gibson	C	10	1	97	27	6	2	1	34	9.7	2.7	.6	.2	.1	3.4
Scotty Pippen Jr.	PG	10	6	212	22	47	19	4	114	21.2	2.2	4.7	1.9	.4	11.4
Adama Bal	SG	8	1	241	25	19	9	1	83	30.1	3.1	2.4	1.1	.1	10.4
PJ Hall^{†}	C	7	0	27	9	2	0	2	13	3.9	1.3	.3	.0	.3	1.9
Lucas Williamson	SG	7	2	224	38	18	11	1	73	32.0	5.4	2.6	1.6	.1	10.4
Dariq Whitehead	SF	6	2	183	24	9	4	0	98	30.5	4.0	1.5	.7	.0	16.3
Toby Okani	SG	6	4	217	21	6	4	3	60	36.2	3.5	1.0	.7	.5	10.0
Kyle Anderson^{†}	SF	4	3	89	14	3	6	4	37	22.3	3.5	.8	1.5	1.0	9.3
Charles Bassey^{†}	C	2	0	31	15	2	1	1	7	15.5	7.5	1.0	.5	.5	3.5
Brandon Clarke	PF	2	2	20	6	1	2	0	8	10.0	3.0	.5	1.0	.0	4.0
Lawson Lovering	C	2	1	49	15	3	3	1	14	24.5	7.5	1.5	1.5	.5	7.0

- ^{†} Denotes player spent time with another team in the season. Stats reflect time with the Grizzlies only.

== Transactions ==
=== Trades ===
Date	Trade		Ref.
June 15, 2025	To Memphis Grizzlies: Cole Anthony; Kentavious Caldwell-Pope; 2025 first-round pick (No. 16) [from Orlando]; 2026 first-round pick (Note: Before this trade Washington had the right to swap its pick (if No. 1–8) for Phoenix's; then Orlando had the right to swap its pick for whatever Phoenix has; then Memphis had the right to swap its pick for whatever Phoenix had. This trade would let Memphis trade either its own pick or Orlando's for whatever Phoenix has after Washington's swap right, as well as keeping the other pick for itself.); 2028 first-round pick (from Orlando); 2029 protected first-round pick swap (from Orlando) (Note: Memphis may swap for the pick if it's No. 3–30.); 2030 first-round pick (from Orlando)	To Orlando Magic: Desmond Bane	
June 25, 2025	To Memphis Grizzlies: Draft rights to Cedric Coward (No. 11)	To Portland Trail Blazers: Draft rights to Yang Hansen (No. 16); 2027 second-round pick (from Atlanta); 2028 first-round pick (from Orlando); 2028 second-round pick (from Sacramento)	
July 6, 2025	To Memphis Grizzlies: Draft rights to Justinian Jessup (2020 No. 51); Draft rights to Jahmai Mashack (No. 59); 2032 protected second-round pick (from Golden State) (Note: Memphis will receive the pick if it's No. 51–60.) (Note: Memphis will receive the pick if it's No. 51–60.)	To Golden State Warriors: Draft rights to Will Richard (No. 56)	
July 6, 2025	To Memphis Grizzlies: 2029 second-round pick (from Portland); 2031 second-round pick swap (Note: Memphis may swap its own pick for the less favorable of the picks originally belonging to Indiana and Miami.)	To Indiana Pacers: Jay Huff	
February 3, 2026	To Memphis Grizzlies: Walter Clayton Jr.; Kyle Anderson; Taylor Hendricks; Georges Niang; 2027 protected first-round pick (from LA Lakers) (Note: Memphis will receive the LA Lakers' 2027 first-round pick if it's No. 5–30.); 2027 first-round pick (from Utah) (Note: The most favorable of the picks originally belonging to Cleveland, Minnesota, and Utah.); 2031 first-round pick (from Phoenix)	To Utah Jazz: Jaren Jackson Jr.; Jock Landale; John Konchar; Vince Williams Jr.	
February 5, 2026	To Philadelphia 76ers: Draft rights to Justinian Jessup	To Memphis Grizzlies: Eric Gordon; 2032 second-round pick swap (from Philadelphia)	

=== Free agency ===
==== Re-signed ====
Date	Player	Ref.

==== Additions ====
Date	Player	Former Team	Ref.
September 23, 2025	(United States) Braxton Key	Golden State Warriors	

==== Subtractions ====
Player	Reason	New Team	Ref.
