= Javon Small =

American basketball player (born 2002)

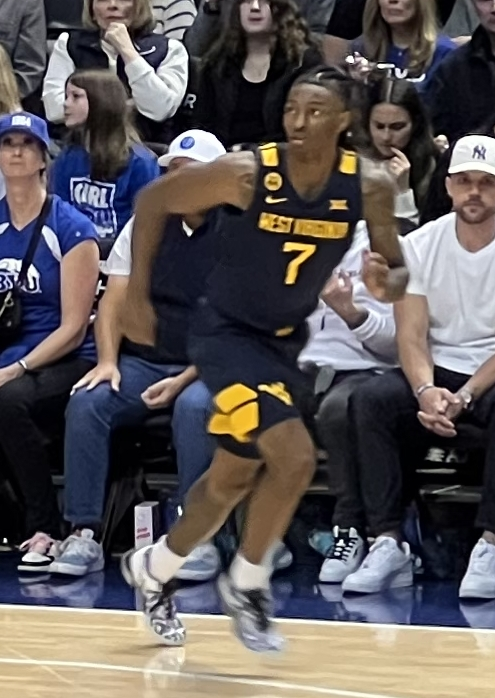
- Small in 2025

No. 10 – Memphis Grizzlies
- Position: Point guard
- League: NBA

Personal information
- Born: December 19, 2002 (age 23) South Bend, Indiana, U.S.
- Listed height: 6 ft 1 in (1.85 m)
- Listed weight: 190 lb (86 kg)

Career information
- High school: James Whitcomb Riley (South Bend, Indiana); Franklin Central (Indianapolis, Indiana); AZ Compass Prep (Chandler, Arizona)
- College: East Carolina (2021–2023); Oklahoma State (2023–2024); West Virginia (2024–2025)
- NBA draft: 2025: 2nd round, 48th overall pick
- Drafted by: Memphis Grizzlies
- Playing career: 2025–present

Career history
- 2025–present: Memphis Grizzlies
- 2025–present: →Memphis Hustle

Career highlights
- First-team All-Big 12 (2025)
- Stats at NBA.com
- Stats at Basketball Reference

Javon Unique Small (born December 19, 2002) is an American professional basketball player for the Memphis Grizzlies of the National Basketball Association (NBA), on a two-way contract with the Memphis Hustle of the NBA G League. He played college basketball for the East Carolina Pirates, Oklahoma State Cowboys, and West Virginia Mountaineers.

== Early life and high school career ==
Small grew up in Indiana and played his senior year at Compass Prep, averaging 11.4 points, 2.8 rebounds, and 1.9 steals per game. Coming out of high school, Small was rated as a three-star recruit and was ranked the 14th best prospect in Arizona. He committed to playing college basketball for East Carolina over other schools such as Ball State, Akron, Indiana State, IUPUI, Kent State, Southern Illinois, and Virginia Tech.

== College career ==
=== East Carolina ===
As a freshman in 2021–22, Small appeared in just 16 games, playing 9.2 minutes per game. In 2022–23, he averaged 15.8 points, 4.8 rebounds, and 5.6 assists per game. After the season, Small entered his name into the NCAA transfer portal.

=== Oklahoma State ===
Small transferred to play for the Oklahoma State Cowboys. On March 9, 2024, he dropped a career-high 34 points versus BYU. During the 2023–24 season, Small appeared in 31 games for the Cowboys, where he averaged 15.1 points, 4.7 rebounds, 4.1 assists, and one steal per game while shooting 44% from the field and 37% from three, earning all-Big 12 Conference honorable mention. After the conclusion of the 2023–24 season, Small once again entered his name into the NCAA transfer portal.

=== West Virginia ===
Small transferred to play for the West Virginia Mountaineers. In his first game with the Mountaineers on November 4, 2024, he notched 15 points, five assists, two rebounds, two steals and one block in a win over Robert Morris. On November 27, 2024, Small scored 31 points (highest in his year at WVU) in the matchup with Gonzaga Bulldogs in the second game of the Bad Boy Mowers Battle 4 Atlantis at Imperial Arena in Paradise Island, Bahamas, securing the win for the Mountaineers 86–78 in overtime. On December 31, 2024, Small scored 13 points including the game-winning free throw, while also adding 11 rebounds and six assists, as he helped the Mountaineers upset #7 Kansas. On January 4, 2025, he scored 24 points in a 69–50 win over his former team, Oklahoma State.

On January 18, 2025, his 12 points in the last 2 minutes of the game secured the Mountaineers with a spectacular win over No. 2 Iowa State, 64–57 (he scored 27 points in the whole game). On February 25, 2025, Small posted 23 points, ten assists, and five rebounds in a win over TCU. During his year with the Mountaineers, he scored 20 or more points in 14 games. On March 30, 2025, he officially declared for the 2025 NBA draft, and was invited to the 2025 NBA draft combine on May 2. Small graduated from West Virginia University with Regents Bachelor of Arts degree on May 18, 2025.

== Professional career ==
Small was selected with the 48th pick in the 2025 NBA draft by the Memphis Grizzlies. On July 10, the Grizzlies announced that the team had signed him to a two-way contract. On October 15, 2025, Small made his NBA debut with the Grizzlies, logging 17 minutes of playing time; in those minutes, Small notched three assists and a block in a 128–122 win over the New Orleans Pelicans. On February 7, Small scored a career high of 22 points (7-10 FG, 2-4 3Pt, 6-6 FT), six rebounds, four assists, and one block across 28 minutes during the Grizzlies' 122–115 loss to the Portland Trail Blazers. Small finished his rookie season averaging 9.7 points, 3.1 rebounds, and 3.7 assists.

== Career statistics ==
Legend
GP	Games played	GS	Games started	MPG	Minutes per game
FG%	Field goal percentage	3P%	3-point field goal percentage	FT%	Free throw percentage
RPG	Rebounds per game	APG	Assists per game	SPG	Steals per game
BPG	Blocks per game	PPG	Points per game	**Bold**	Career high

=== NBA ===
Year	Team	GP	GS	MPG	FG%	3P%	FT%	RPG	APG	SPG	BPG	PPG
2025–26	Memphis	41	12	20.2	.465	.423	.829	3.1	3.7	.8	.2	9.7
Career		41	12	20.2	.465	.423	.829	3.1	3.7	.8	.2	9.7

=== College ===
Year	Team	GP	GS	MPG	FG%	3P%	FT%	RPG	APG	SPG	BPG	PPG
2021–22	East Carolina	16	0	9.2	.263	.217	**1.000**	.6	1.1	.1	.0	2.0
2022–23	East Carolina	18	17	34.7	.397	.333	.854	**4.8**	**5.6**	1.2	.2	15.8
2023–24	Oklahoma State	31	31	33.0	**.441**	**.374**	.866	4.7	4.1	1.0	**.3**	15.1
2024–25	West Virginia	**32**	**32**	**36.1**	.418	.353	.880	4.1	**5.6**	**1.5**	**.3**	**18.6**
Career		97	80	30.4	.415	.350	.871	3.9	4.4	1.1	.2	14.2
