= Cedric Coward =

American basketball player (born 2003)

No. 23 – Memphis Grizzlies
- Position: Shooting guard
- League: NBA

Personal information
- Born: September 11, 2003 (age 23) Fresno, California, U.S.
- Listed height: 6 ft 5 in (1.96 m)
- Listed weight: 206 lb (93 kg)

Career information
- High school: Central (Fresno, California)
- College: Willamette (2021–2022); Eastern Washington (2022–2024); Washington State (2024–2025)
- NBA draft: 2025: 1st round, 11th overall pick
- Drafted by: Portland Trail Blazers
- Playing career: 2025–present

Career history
- 2025–present: Memphis Grizzlies

Career highlights
- NBA All-Rookie First Team (2026); First-team All-Big Sky (2024); Northwest Conference Freshman of the Year (2022); First-team All-Northwest Conference (2022)
- Stats at NBA.com
- Stats at Basketball Reference

Cedric De'Von Coward (born September 11, 2003) is an American professional basketball player for the Memphis Grizzlies of the National Basketball Association (NBA). He played college basketball for the Willamette Bearcats, Eastern Washington Eagles and Washington State Cougars.

== Early life and high school career ==
Coward grew up in Fresno, California and attended Central High School.

== College career ==
Coward began his college career at Division III Willamette University. In his only season with the Bearcats, averaged 19.5 points and 12.0 rebounds per game and was named the Northwest Conference Freshman of the Year and first-team All-Northwest.

After his freshman season, Coward transferred to Eastern Washington University. In his first season with the Eastern Washington Eagles, he averaged 7.3 points per game with 5.6 rebounds per game Coward was named first-team All-Big Sky Conference as a junior after averaging 15.4 points and 6.7 rebounds per game. After the season, he entered the NCAA transfer portal.

Coward committed to transfer to Washington State. He suffered a season-ending shoulder injury six games into his first season with the team. At the time of his injury, Coward was the Cougars' leading scorer at 17.7 points per game and was averaging seven rebounds per game.

Following his senior season, Coward entered the transfer portal along with declaring for the 2025 NBA draft. On April 28, 2025, he committed to Duke, but kept his name in the draft. After the NBA Combine, Coward announced on May 24 that he would forgo playing at Duke and remain in the draft pool.

== Professional career ==
Coward was drafted 11th overall by the Portland Trail Blazers in the 2025 NBA draft and subsequently traded to the Memphis Grizzlies for Yang Hansen and future draft considerations. He signed with the Grizzlies on July 8.

On October 25, 2025, Coward put up 27 points on 6-for-6 shooting from three-point range in a 128–103 win over the Indiana Pacers. He became the first rookie in Grizzlies franchise history to record at least six made three-pointers in a game without a miss.

At the end of his rookie season, Coward finished fifth in Rookie of the Year voting and was named to the NBA All-Rookie First Team.

== Personal life ==
Coward is the grandson of sprinter Maxie Parks.

== Career statistics ==
Legend
GP	Games played	GS	Games started	MPG	Minutes per game
FG%	Field goal percentage	3P%	3-point field goal percentage	FT%	Free throw percentage
RPG	Rebounds per game	APG	Assists per game	SPG	Steals per game
BPG	Blocks per game	PPG	Points per game	**Bold**	Career high

=== NBA ===
Year	Team	GP	GS	MPG	FG%	3P%	FT%	RPG	APG	SPG	BPG	PPG
2025–26	Memphis	62	47	25.8	.471	.338	.843	5.9	2.8	.6	.4	13.6
Career		62	47	25.8	.471	.338	.843	5.9	2.8	.6	.4	13.6

=== College ===
==== NCAA Division I ====
Year	Team	GP	GS	MPG	FG%	3P%	FT%	RPG	APG	SPG	BPG	PPG
2022–23	Eastern Washington	**34**	2	21.6	**.683**	.394	.742	5.6	1.8	.8	.6	7.3
2023–24	Eastern Washington	32	**32**	30.5	.565	.383	**.895**	6.7	1.7	**1.0**	.9	15.4
2024–25	Washington State	6	6	**33.0**	.557	**.400**	.839	**7.0**	**3.7**	.8	**1.7**	**17.7**
Career		72	40	26.5	.595	.388	.832	6.2	1.9	.9	.8	11.8

==== NCAA Division III ====
Year	Team	GP	GS	MPG	FG%	3P%	FT%	RPG	APG	SPG	BPG	PPG
2021–22	Willamette	24	19	30.4	.608	.453	.746	12.0	3.8	1.5	2.8	19.5
