= 2024–25 Iowa State Cyclones men's basketball team =

American college basketball season

2024–25 Iowa State Cyclones men's basketball

NCAA tournament, Second round
- Conference: Big 12 Conference

Ranking
- Coaches: No. 17
- AP: No. 17
- Record: 25–10 (13–7 Big 12)
- Head coach: T. J. Otzelberger (4th season)
- Assistant coaches: Kyle Green; J. R. Blount; Nate Schmidt; Diante Garrett; Erik Crawford
- Home arena: Hilton Coliseum

2024–25 Big 12 men's basketball standings
| | Conf. | | | | Overall |
| Team | W | | L | PCT | W | | L | PCT |
|---|---|---|---|---|---|---|---|---|
| No. 2 Houston † | 19 | – | 1 | .950 | 35 | – | 5 | .875 |
| No. 8 Texas Tech | 15 | – | 5 | .750 | 28 | – | 9 | .757 |
| No. 15 Arizona | 14 | – | 6 | .700 | 24 | – | 13 | .649 |
| No. 13 BYU | 14 | – | 6 | .700 | 26 | – | 10 | .722 |
| No. 17 Iowa State | 13 | – | 7 | .650 | 25 | – | 10 | .714 |
| Kansas | 11 | – | 9 | .550 | 21 | – | 13 | .618 |
| Baylor | 10 | – | 10 | .500 | 20 | – | 15 | .571 |
| West Virginia | 10 | – | 10 | .500 | 19 | – | 13 | .594 |
| TCU | 9 | – | 11 | .450 | 16 | – | 16 | .500 |
| Kansas State | 9 | – | 11 | .450 | 16 | – | 17 | .485 |
| Utah | 8 | – | 12 | .400 | 16 | – | 17 | .485 |
| Oklahoma State | 7 | – | 13 | .350 | 17 | – | 18 | .486 |
| Cincinnati | 7 | – | 13 | .350 | 19 | – | 16 | .543 |
| UCF | 7 | – | 13 | .350 | 20 | – | 17 | .541 |
| Arizona State | 4 | – | 16 | .200 | 13 | – | 20 | .394 |
| Colorado | 3 | – | 17 | .150 | 14 | – | 21 | .400 |
† 2025 Big 12 tournament winner Rankings from AP poll

The 2024–25 Iowa State Cyclones men's basketball team represented Iowa State University during the 2024–25 NCAA Division I men's basketball season. The Cyclones were led by T. J. Otzelberger in his fourth season as head coach. They played their home games at Hilton Coliseum in Ames, Iowa as members of the Big 12 Conference. On January 13, the Cyclones reached #2 in the AP Poll, which was the highest ranking in program history.

The Iowa State Cyclones drew an average home attendance of 14,062, the 17th-highest of all college basketball teams.

== Previous season ==
The Cyclones started the season 11–2 in non-conference play. They finished the 2023–24 season 29–8, 13–5 in Big 12 play to finish in second place. As the No. 2 seed in the Big 12 tournament, they defeated the No. 10 seed Kansas State, No. 3 seed Baylor and No. 1 seed Houston to win their sixth Big 12 tournament title and receive the conference's automatic bid to the NCAA tournament. They received a 2 seed in the East region. The defeated 15 seed South Dakota State, No. 7 seed Washington State, before losing to No. 3 seed Illinois in the Sweet Sixteen, 72–69.

== Offseason ==
=== Departures ===
Offseason departures
| Name | Position | Reason for departure |
|---|---|---|
| Tre King | F | Exhausted eligibility |
| Hason Ward | F | Exhausted eligibility |
| Robert Jones | F | Exhausted eligibility |

=== Incoming transfers ===
Incoming transfers
| Name | Position | Hometown | Previous school | Incoming eligibility | Source |
|---|---|---|---|---|---|
| Brandton Chatfield | F | Orofino, Idaho | Seattle | 1 | |
| Nate Heise | G | Lake City, Minnesota | Northern Iowa | 1 | |
| Dishon Jackson | C | Oakland, California | Charlotte | 2 | |
| Joshua Jefferson | F | Las Vegas, Nevada | Saint Mary's | 2 | |

=== 2024 recruiting class ===
College recruiting
| Name | Hometown | School | Height | Weight | Commit date |
|---|---|---|---|---|---|
| Nojus Indrusaitis; G | Chicago | Brewster Academy | 6 ft 5 in (1.96 m) | 185 lb (84 kg) | Dec 12, 2022 |
| Nojus Indrusaitis; G | Recruit ratings: Rivals: 247Sports: ESPN: (85) | | | | |
| Dwayne Pierce; F | Middle Village, New York | Christ The King Regional | 6 ft 5 in (1.96 m) | 210 lb (95 kg) | Jan 22, 2023 |
| Dwayne Pierce; F | Recruit ratings: Rivals: 247Sports: ESPN: (82) | | | | |
Overall recruit ranking:
Note: In many cases, Scout, Rivals, 247Sports, On3, and ESPN may conflict in their listings of height and weight.; In these cases, the average was taken. ESPN grades are on a 100-point scale.; Sources: "Iowa State 2024 Basketball Commitments". Rivals.; "2024 Iowa State Cyclones Recruiting Class". ESPN.; "2024 Team Ranking". Rivals.

== Preseason ==
Big 12 Preseason Poll

| | Big 12 Coaches | Points |
| 1. | Kansas | 215 (9) |
| 2. | Houston | 211 (5) |
| 3. | Iowa State | 194 (1) |
| 4. | Baylor | 185 |
| 5. | Arizona | 179 (1) |
| 6. | Cincinnati | 140 |
| 7. | Texas Tech | 135 |
| 8. | Kansas State | 133 |
| 9. | BYU | 116 |
| 10. | TCU | 90 |
| 11. | UCF | 83 |
| 12. | Arizona State | 64 |
| 13. | West Virginia | 62 |
| 14. | Oklahoma State | 46 |
| 15. | Colorado | 37 |
| 16. | Utah | 30 |
Reference: (#) first-place votes

Pre-Season All-Big 12 Team

First Team

| Player | School |
|---|---|
| Caleb Love | Arizona |
| LJ Cryer | Houston |
| J’Wan Roberts | Houston |
| Tamin Lipsey | Iowa State |
| Hunter Dickinson† | Kansas |
† denotes unanimous selection Reference:

Second Team

| Player | School |
|---|---|
| Norchad Omier | Baylor |
| Jeremy Roach | Baylor |
| Keshon Gilbert | Iowa State |
| Dajuan Harris Jr. | Kansas |
| Coleman Hawkins | Kansas State |
† denotes unanimous selection Reference:

- Player of the Year: Hunter Dickinson, Kansas
- Co-Newcomer of the Year: Jeremy Roach, Baylor & Coleman Hawkins, Kansas State
- Freshman of the Year: V. J. Edgecombe, Baylor

== Roster ==
2024–25 Iowa State Cyclones men's basketball team
Players
Coaches

| Pos. | # | Name | Height | Weight | Year | Previous school | Hometown |
|---|---|---|---|---|---|---|---|
| G | 0 | Nate Heise | 6 ft 5 in (1.96 m) | 205 lb (93 kg) | RS Sr | Northern Iowa | Lake City, Minnesota |
| C | 1 | Dishon Jackson | 6 ft 11 in (2.11 m) | 260 lb (118 kg) | RS Sr | Charlotte | Oakland, California |
| F | | Joshua Jefferson | 6 ft 9 in (2.06 m) | 240 lb (109 kg) | Jr | Christ the King | Las Vegas, Nevada |
| G | 3 | Tamin Lipsey | 6 ft 1 in (1.85 m) | 200 lb (91 kg) | Jr | Ames High School | Ames, Iowa |
| G | 4 | Demarion Watson | 6 ft 7 in (2.01 m) | 215 lb (98 kg) | Jr | Totino-Grace | Minneapolis |
| G | 5 | Curtis Jones | 6 ft 4 in (1.93 m) | 175 lb (79 kg) | Sr | Buffalo | Minneapolis |
| G | 10 | Keshon Gilbert | 6 ft 4 in (1.93 m) | 190 lb (86 kg) | Sr | UNLV | St. Louis, Missouri |
| F | 11 | Kayden Fish | 6 ft 6 in (1.98 m) | 250 lb (113 kg) | RS Fr | Staley | Kansas City, Missouri |
| G | 13 | Cade Kelderman (W) | 6 ft 1 in (1.85 m) | 170 lb (77 kg) | So | Waukee Northwest | Waukee, Iowa |
| G | 15 | Nojus Indrusaitis | 6 ft 5 in (1.96 m) | 200 lb (91 kg) | Fr | Brewster Academy | Chicago |
| F | 22 | Milan Momcilovic | 6 ft 8 in (2.03 m) | 210 lb (95 kg) | So | Pewaukee | Pewaukee, Wisconsin |
| F | 23 | Conrad Hawley (W) | 6 ft 5 in (1.96 m) | 220 lb (100 kg) | Sr | Kansas* | Raymore, Missouri |
| C | 30 | JT Rock | 7 ft 1 in (2.16 m) | 245 lb (111 kg) | RS Fr | Lincoln | Sioux Falls, South Dakota |
| F | 33 | Brandton Chatfield | 6 ft 10 in (2.08 m) | 260 lb (118 kg) | RS Sr | Seattle | Orofino, Idaho |

Head coach

- T. J. Otzelberger (UW–Whitewater)

Assistant coach(es)

- Kyle Green (Hamline)
- J.R. Blount (Loyola Chicago)
- Nate Schmidt (Denison)
- Erik Crawford (Northern Iowa)
- Diante Garrett (Iowa State)

Legend

- (C) Team captain
- (S) Suspended
- (I) Ineligible
- (W) Walk-on
- Injured
- Current redshirt

Roster
Last update: May 29, 2024

*Hawley played football at Kansas and was not a member of the basketball team

== Schedule and results ==
| Date time, TV | Rank^{#} | Opponent^{#} | Result | Record | High points | High rebounds | High assists | Site (attendance) city, state |
Non-conference regular season
| Nov 4, 2024*; 7:00 p.m., ESPN+ | No. 5 | Mississippi Valley State | W 83–44 | 1–0 | 17 – Gilbert | 6 – Tied | 4 – Lipsey | Hilton Coliseum (13,616); Ames, IA |
| Nov 11, 2024*; 7:00 p.m., ESPN+ | No. 7 | Kansas City | W 82–56 | 2–0 | 20 – Jones | 6 – Jackson | 10 – Gilbert | Hilton Coliseum (13,464); Ames, IA |
| Nov 18, 2024*; 7:00 p.m., ESPN+ | No. 5 | IU Indy | W 87–52 | 3–0 | 20 – Jones | 10 – Tied | 4 – Jefferson | Hilton Coliseum (13,615); Ames, IA |
| Nov 25, 2024*; 8:00 p.m., ESPNU | No. 5 | vs. No. 4 Auburn; Maui Invitational First round | L 81–83 | 3–1 | 23 – Gilbert | 8 – Jefferson | 3 – Jones | Lahaina Civic Center (2,400); Lahaina, HI |
| Nov 26, 2024*; 7:30 p.m., ESPNU | No. 5 | vs. Dayton; Maui Invitational consolation second round | W 89–84 | 4–1 | 24 – Gilbert | 6 – Jackson | 3 – Tied | Lahaina Civic Center (2,400); Lahaina, HI |
| Nov 27, 2024*; 1:30 p.m., ESPN2 | No. 5 | vs. Colorado; Maui Invitational 5th place game | W 99–71 | 5–1 | 24 – Momcilovic | 6 – Tied | 6 – Gilbert | Lahaina Civic Center (2,400); Lahaina, HI |
| Dec 4, 2024*; 7:00 p.m., ESPN+ | No. 6 | No. 5 Marquette; Big East–Big 12 Battle | W 81–70 | 6–1 | 24 – Gilbert | 12 – Jefferson | 7 – Gilbert | Hilton Coliseum (14,267); Ames, IA |
| Dec 8, 2024*; 5:00 p.m., ESPN+ | No. 6 | Jackson State | W 100–58 | 7–1 | 19 – Jones | 13 – Jefferson | 9 – Lipsey | Hilton Coliseum (13,658); Ames, IA |
| Dec 12, 2024*; 6:30 p.m., FS1 | No. 3 | at Iowa; Rivalry | W 89–80 | 8–1 | 23 – Jones | 10 – Jefferson | 7 – Jefferson | Carver–Hawkeye Arena (13,033); Iowa City, IA |
| Dec 15, 2024*; 12:00 p.m., CBSSN | No. 3 | Omaha | W 83–51 | 9–1 | 16 – Gilbert | 8 – Jefferson | 6 – Jones | Hilton Coliseum (14,267); Ames, IA |
| Dec 22, 2024*; 12:00 p.m., ESPN+ | No. 3 | Morgan State | W 99–72 | 10–1 | 20 – Lipsey | 12 – Jefferson | 7 – Gilbert | Hilton Coliseum (14,267); Ames, IA |
Big 12
| Dec 30, 2024; 8:00 p.m., CBSSN | No. 3 | at Colorado | W 79–69 | 11–1 (1–0) | 20 – Jones | 7 – Tied | 3 – Gilbert | CU Events Center (9,157); Boulder, CO |
| Jan 4, 2025; 1:00 p.m., CBS | No. 3 | No. 25 Baylor | W 74–55 | 12–1 (2–0) | 16 – Gilbert | 10 – Tied | 8 – Jefferson | Hilton Coliseum (14,267); Ames, IA |
| Jan 7, 2025; 7:00 p.m., ESPN+ | No. 3 | Utah | W 82–59 | 13–1 (3–0) | 23 – Jones | 7 – Lipsey | 6 – Jones | Hilton Coliseum (13,496); Ames, IA |
| Jan 11, 2025; 1:00 p.m., ESPN | No. 3 | at Texas Tech | W 85–84 ^{OT} | 14–1 (4–0) | 26 – Jones | 8 – Jefferson | 4 – Gilbert | United Supermarkets Arena (14,263); Lubbock, TX |
| Jan 15, 2025; 6:00 p.m., ESPN2 | No. 2 | No. 9 Kansas | W 74–57 | 15–1 (5–0) | 25 – Jones | 12 – Jefferson | 8 – Gilbert | Hilton Coliseum (14,267); Ames, IA |
| Jan 18, 2025; 4:00 p.m., ESPN+ | No. 2 | at West Virginia | L 57–64 | 15–2 (5–1) | 16 – Jones | 9 – Jefferson | 2 – Gilbert | WVU Coliseum (14,444); Morgantown, WV |
| Jan 21, 2025; 7:00 p.m., ESPN+ | No. 3 | UCF | W 108–83 | 16–2 (6–1) | 30 – Jefferson | 8 – Jones | 8 – Gilbert | Hilton Coliseum (14,267); Ames, IA |
| Jan 25, 2025; 1:00 p.m., ESPN+ | No. 3 | at Arizona State | W 76–61 | 17–2 (7–1) | 33 – Jones | 10 – Jefferson | 3 – Tied | Desert Financial Arena (12,762); Tempe, AZ |
| Jan 27, 2025; 9:30 p.m., ESPN | No. 3 | at Arizona | L 75–86 ^{OT} | 17–3 (7–2) | 18 – Lipsey | 10 – Jackson | 4 – Jefferson | McKale Center (14,688); Tucson, AZ |
| Feb 1, 2025; 1:00 p.m., ESPN2 | No. 3 | Kansas State | L 61–80 | 17–4 (7–3) | 20 – Lipsey | 7 – Watson | 3 – Tied | Hilton Coliseum (14,267); Ames, IA |
| Feb 3, 2025; 8:00 p.m., ESPN | No. 8 | at No. 16 Kansas | L 52–69 | 17–5 (7–4) | 11 – Tied | 9 – Jackson | 3 – Jefferson | Allen Fieldhouse (15,300); Lawrence, KS |
| Feb 8, 2025; 11:00 a.m., ESPN+ | No. 8 | TCU; College GameDay | W 82–52 | 18–5 (8–4) | 24 – Jones | 10 – Jefferson | 8 – Gilbert | Hilton Coliseum (14,267); Ames, IA |
| Feb 11, 2025; 6:00 p.m., ESPN+ | No. 10 | at UCF | W 77–65 | 19–5 (9–4) | 15 – Gilbert | 8 – Jefferson | 5 – Jones | Addition Financial Arena (8,614); Orlando, FL |
| Feb 15, 2025; 3:00 p.m., ESPN2 | No. 10 | Cincinnati | W 81–70 | 20–5 (10–4) | 22 – Jones | 7 – Jefferson | 4 – Gilbert | Hilton Coliseum (14,267); Ames, IA |
| Feb 18, 2025; 7:00 p.m., ESPN+ | No. 8 | Colorado | W 79–65 | 21–5 (11–4) | 13 – Tied | 7 – Jefferson | 5 – Gilbert | Hilton Coliseum (14,267); Ames, IA |
| Feb 22, 2025; 1:00 p.m., ESPN | No. 8 | at No. 5 Houston; College GameDay | L 59–68 | 21–6 (11–5) | 16 – Momcilovic | 5 – Momcilovic | 8 – Jefferson | Fertitta Center (7,377); Houston, TX |
| Feb 25, 2025; 7:00 p.m., ESPN+ | No. 9 | at Oklahoma State | L 68–74 | 21–7 (11–6) | 17 – Jefferson | 9 – Jefferson | 5 – Jefferson | Gallagher-Iba Arena (5,903); Stillwater, OK |
| Mar 1, 2025; 8:00 p.m., ESPN | No. 9 | No. 22 Arizona | W 84–67 | 22–7 (12–6) | 16 – Momcilovic | 8 – Chatfield | 8 – Lipsey | Hilton Coliseum (14,267); Ames, IA |
| March 4, 2025; 8:00 p.m., ESPN2 | No. 10 | No. 23 BYU | L 85–88 ^{2OT} | 22–8 (12–7) | 19 – Jefferson | 5 – Heise | 8 – Lipsey | Hilton Coliseum (14,267); Ames, IA |
| Mar 8, 2025; 12:30 p.m., CBS | No. 10 | at Kansas State | W 73–57 | 23–8 (13–7) | 24 – Jones | 7 – Jefferson | 5 – Jones | Bramlage Coliseum (8,720); Manhattan, KS |
Big 12 Tournament
| March 12, 2025; 11:30 a.m., ESPN | (5) No. 12 | vs. (13) Cincinnati; Second round | W 73–56 | 24–8 | 19 – Jefferson | 15 – Jackson | 5 – Jefferson | T-Mobile Center (12,922); Kansas City, MO |
| March 13, 2025; 11:30 a.m., ESPN2 | (5) No. 12 | vs. (4) No. 17 BYU; Quarterfinal | L 92–96 | 24–9 | 31 – Jones | 7 – Heise | 6 – Jefferson | T-Mobile Center (15,366); Kansas City, MO |
NCAA Tournament
| March 21, 2025*; 12:30 p.m., TNT | (3 S) No. 15 | vs. (14 S) Lipscomb; First round | W 82–55 | 25–9 | 20 – Momcilovic | 8 – Jefferson | 8 – Jefferson | Fiserv Forum (16,899); Milwaukee, WI |
| March 23, 2025*; 6:45 p.m., TruTV | (3 S) No. 15 | vs. (6 S) Ole Miss; Second round | L 78–91 | 25–10 | 25 – Jones | 8 – Jefferson | 3 – Jones | Fiserv Forum (16,829); Milwaukee, WI |
*Non-conference game. ^{#}Rankings from AP poll. (#) Tournament seedings in parentheses. S=South. All times are in Central Time.

== Rankings ==
Ranking movements Legend: ██ Increase in ranking ██ Decrease in ranking ( ) = First-place votes
| | Week | | | | | | | | | | | | | | | | | | | | |
| Poll | Pre | 1 | 2 | 3 | 4 | 5 | 6 | 7 | 8 | 9 | 10 | 11 | 12 | 13 | 14 | 15 | 16 | 17 | 18 | 19 | Final |
|---|---|---|---|---|---|---|---|---|---|---|---|---|---|---|---|---|---|---|---|---|---|
| AP | 5 | 7 | 5 | 5 | 6 | 3 (1) | 3 | 3 | 3 | 3 | 2 | 3 | 3 | 8 | 10 | 8 | 9 | 10 | 12 | 15 | 17 |
| Coaches | 6 | 7 | 5 | 5 | 5 | 3 | 3 | 3 | 3 | 3 | 2 (5) | 4 (1) | 3 | 8 | 10 | 8 | 9 | 10 | 12 | 14 | 17 |
