= Adama Bal =

French basketball player (born 2003)

No. 8 – Wisconsin Herd
- Position: Point guard / shooting guard
- League: NBA G League

Personal information
- Born: 18 December 2003 (age 22) Le Mans, France
- Listed height: 6 ft 7 in (2.01 m)
- Listed weight: 190 lb (86 kg)

Career information
- College: Arizona (2021–2023); Santa Clara (2023–2025)
- NBA draft: 2025: undrafted
- Playing career: 2020–present

Career history
- 2020–2021: Centre Fédéral de Basket-ball
- 2025–2026: Westchester Knicks
- 2026: Memphis Grizzlies
- 2026–present: Wisconsin Herd

Career highlights
- 2× First-team All-WCC (2024, 2025)
- Stats at NBA.com
- Stats at Basketball Reference

Adama-Alpha Bal (born 18 December 2003) is a French professional basketball player for the Wisconsin Herd of the NBA G League. He played college basketball for the Arizona Wildcats and Santa Clara Broncos. Bal has previously appeared in eight National Basketball Association (NBA) games for the Memphis Grizzlies.

== Early life ==
Bal was born on 18 December 2003, and grew up in Le Mans, France. He played basketball for the third-tier Centre Fédéral de Basket-ball (CFBB) team in Paris, averaging 9.8 points, 2.4 rebounds and 2.1 assists while playing 27 minutes per game in the 2020–21 season. He was ranked one of the top European college basketball prospects and committed to play for the Arizona Wildcats.

== College career ==
As a freshman at Arizona in the 2021–22 season, Bal played 23 games and averaged 4.5 minutes per game, scoring 34 total points with 1.5 per game. The following season, he played 26 games and averaged 2.5 points and shot 35.4% in 3-point range. After having played just 104 minutes as a freshman and 214 as a sophomore, Bal entered the NCAA transfer portal in 2023.

Bal ultimately transferred to the Santa Clara Broncos for his junior year. He quickly became a top player for the team in the West Coast Conference.

== International career ==
Bal was a member of the France national under-16 basketball team and competed at the 2019 FIBA U16 European Championship, where he averaged 6.0 points, 1.0 rebound and 1.0 assist in seven games while helping France win second place. He has also been a member of the national under-20 team, playing for them at the 2022 FIBA U20 European Championship.

== Professional career ==
On July 1, 2025, Bal signed with SIG Strasbourg of the French LNB Pro A. However, on September 24, Bal left Strasbourg before playing for them.

On October 26, 2025, it was announced that Bal would play for the Westchester Knicks of the NBA G League.

On March 28, 2026, the Memphis Grizzlies signed Bal to a 10-day contract. On April 7, he re-signed with Memphis on a second 10-day contract. On April 10, Bal made his first career start, recording 18 points, two rebounds, and four assists in a 101–147 loss to the Utah Jazz.

== Career statistics ==
Legend
GP	Games played	GS	Games started	MPG	Minutes per game
FG%	Field goal percentage	3P%	3-point field goal percentage	FT%	Free throw percentage
RPG	Rebounds per game	APG	Assists per game	SPG	Steals per game
BPG	Blocks per game	PPG	Points per game	**Bold**	Career high

=== NBA ===
Year	Team	GP	GS	MPG	FG%	3P%	FT%	RPG	APG	SPG	BPG	PPG
2025–26	Memphis	8	1	30.1	.412	.409	.900	3.1	2.4	1.1	.1	10.4
Career		8	1	30.1	.412	.409	.900	3.1	2.4	1.1	.1	10.4

== Personal life ==
Bal and fellow NBA player Rayan Rupert grew up together in France as childhood best friends; the two later became teammates on the Memphis Grizzlies during the 2025–26 NBA season.
