= Kanon Catchings =

American basketball player (born 2005)

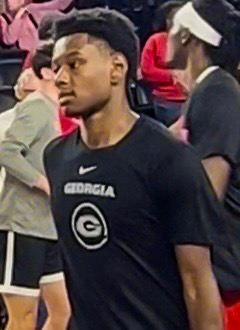
- Catchings in 2025

No. 6 – Georgia Bulldogs
- Position: Power forward
- League: Southeastern Conference

Personal information
- Born: August 10, 2005 (age 21)
- Listed height: 6 ft 9 in (2.06 m)
- Listed weight: 220 lb (100 kg)

Career information
- High school: Brownsburg (Brownsburg, Indiana); Overtime Elite Academy (Atlanta, Georgia)
- College: BYU (2024–2025); Georgia (2025–present)

Kanon Catchings (born August 10, 2005) is an American basketball player for the Georgia Bulldogs of the Southeastern Conference (SEC). He previously played for the BYU Cougars.

== Early life and high school ==
Catchings grew up in Brownsburg, Indiana and initially attended Brownsburg High School. He averaged 17.5 points and 4.8 rebounds per game as a junior. After his junior year, Catchings opted to leave Brownsburg to join the Overtime Elite league as a non-professional player for team Cold Hearts in order to preserve his collegiate eligibility. He averaged 14.4 points and 5.7 rebounds per game during the regular season.

Catchings was rated a four-star recruit and initially committed to play college basketball at Purdue during his sophomore year over offers from Butler, Indiana, Illinois, Ohio State, and Cincinnati. After his senior year, he requested a release from his National Letter of Intent (NLI) and reopened his recruitment. Catchings later committed to play at BYU after considering Florida State and NC State.

== College career ==
Catchings enrolled at Brigham Young University in June 2024 in order to take part in the Cougars' summer practices. He averaged 7.2 points and 2.2 rebounds per game as a freshman, helping the Cougars reach the Sweet 16 of the NCAA Tournament. Following the season he opted to transfer to Georgia. Catchings averaged 11.6 points and 4.8 rebounds per game as a sophomore.

== Personal life ==
Catchings is the nephew of Naismith Hall of Famer Tamika Catchings. His mother, Tauja, played college basketball at Illinois and professionally overseas. Catchings' grandfather, Harvey Catchings, played 11 seasons in the NBA.
