= Toby Okani =

American basketball player (born 2001)

No. 5 – Westchester Knicks
- Position: Small forward
- League: NBA G League

Personal information
- Born: October 5, 2001 (age 25) Orange, New Jersey, U.S.
- Listed height: 6 ft 8 in (2.03 m)
- Listed weight: 210 lb (95 kg)

Career information
- High school: West Orange (West Orange, New Jersey); St. Benedict's Prep (Newark, New Jersey); Cushing Academy (Ashburnham, Massachusetts)
- College: Duquesne (2020–2022); UIC (2022–2024); West Virginia (2024–2025)
- NBA draft: 2025: undrafted
- Playing career: 2025–present

Career history
- 2025–present: Westchester Knicks
- 2026: Memphis Grizzlies
- Stats at NBA.com
- Stats at Basketball Reference

Tochukwu Okani (born October 5, 2001) is an American basketball player for the Westchester Knicks of the NBA G League. He played college basketball for the Duquesne Dukes, UIC Flames, and West Virginia Mountaineers.

== College career ==
Okani spent two seasons at Duquesne before transferring to UIC. As a senior, he averaged 11.1 points, 6.8 rebounds, 2.0 blocks and 1.5 steals per game and was named to the Missouri Valley Conference’s All-Defensive Team. After UIC fired coach Luke Yaklich, Okani entered the transfer portal. In his sole season at West Virginia, Okani averaged 8.2 points and 4.1 rebounds per game.

== Professional career ==
Following his college career, Okani played for the Westchester Knicks of the NBA G League. He averaged 8.8 points and 4.2 rebounds over 13 games. He was then signed to a 10-day contract with the Memphis Grizzlies of the NBA on April 3, 2026. He made his NBA debut on the same day, scoring seven points and collecting seven rebounds in 28 minutes of action.

On September 15, 2026, Okani signed an Exhibit 10 contract with the New York Knicks, but was waived the same day.

== Career statistics ==
Legend
GP	Games played	GS	Games started	MPG	Minutes per game
FG%	Field goal percentage	3P%	3-point field goal percentage	FT%	Free throw percentage
RPG	Rebounds per game	APG	Assists per game	SPG	Steals per game
BPG	Blocks per game	PPG	Points per game	**Bold**	Career high

=== NBA ===
Year	Team	GP	GS	MPG	FG%	3P%	FT%	RPG	APG	SPG	BPG	PPG
2025–26	Memphis	6	4	36.2	.357	.290	.125	3.5	1.0	.7	.5	10.0
Career		6	4	36.2	.357	.290	.125	3.5	1.0	.7	.5	10.0
