= Lawson Lovering =

American basketball player (born 2003)

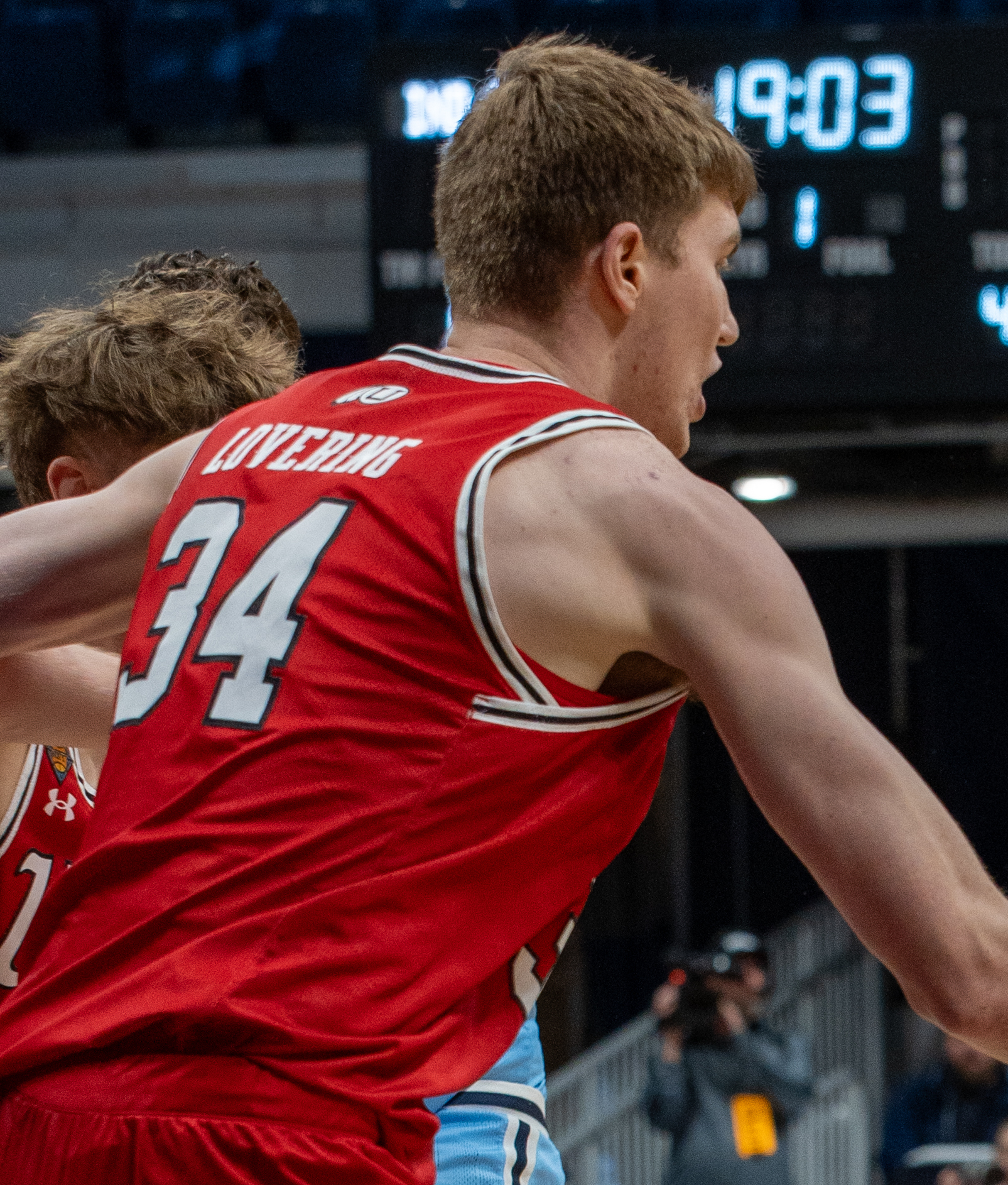
- Lovering in 2024

No. 18 – Memphis Hustle
- Position: Center
- League: NBA G League

Personal information
- Born: May 9, 2003 (age 23) Cheyenne, Wyoming, U.S.
- Listed height: 7 ft 0 in (2.13 m)
- Listed weight: 235 lb (107 kg)

Career information
- High school: Cheyenne Central (Cheyenne, Wyoming)
- College: Colorado (2021–2023); Utah (2023–2025)
- NBA draft: 2025: undrafted
- Playing career: 2025–present

Career history
- 2025–2026: Memphis Hustle
- 2026: Memphis Grizzlies
- 2026: Los Angeles Lakers
- 2026–present: Memphis Hustle
- Stats at NBA.com
- Stats at Basketball Reference

Lawson Lovering (born May 9, 2003) is an American basketball player for the Memphis Hustle of the NBA G League. He played college basketball for the Colorado Buffaloes and Utah Utes.

== Career ==
Lovering played his first two seasons of college basketball for Colorado, but he eventually entered the transfer portal after his sophomore season, ultimately landing at the University of Utah.

Undrafted out of college, Lovering landed with the Memphis Hustle of the NBA G League, where he averaged 8.9 points and 7.8 rebounds in 13 games. On February 9, 2026, he was signed to a 10-day contract by the Memphis Grizzlies, making his NBA debut on February 11. In his debut, Lovering recorded three points, four rebounds and two steals in 18 minutes of action. Upon the expiration of his 10-day contract, he returned to the Hustle.

On October 28, 2026, Lovering signed a two-way contract with the Los Angeles Lakers. He was waived on November 10.

== Career statistics ==
=== NBA ===
Year	Team	GP	GS	MPG	FG%	3P%	FT%	RPG	APG	SPG	BPG	PPG
2025–26	Memphis	2	1	24.5	.600	.000	.400	7.5	1.5	1.5	.5	7.0
2026–27	L.A. Lakers	2	0	1.5	.000	–	–	.5	.0	.0	.5	.0
Career		4	1	13.0	.600	.000	.400	4.0	.8	.8	.5	3.5
