= Memphis Hustle =

American professional basketball team of the NBA G League

- Conference: Western
- League: NBA G League
- Founded: 2017
- History: Memphis Hustle; 2017–present
- Arena: Landers Center
- Location: Southaven, Mississippi
- Team colors: Red, gray, white
- Team manager: Mitchell Wilbekin
- Head coach: Rob Sanicola
- Ownership: Memphis Grizzlies
- Affiliation: Memphis Grizzlies
- Website: Memphis Hustle website

The Memphis Hustle are an American professional basketball team of the NBA G League based in Southaven, Mississippi. They are affiliated with the Memphis Grizzlies, and play their home games at the Landers Center.

== History ==
On January 23, 2017, it was announced that the Iowa Energy would not renew their hybrid affiliation deal with the Grizzlies, but be purchased by the Minnesota Timberwolves to serve as their G-League affiliate beginning in the 2017–18 season. That same day, the Grizzlies announced that they would be purchasing an expansion team "for the Mid-South" to begin play in 2017–18 in Southaven, Mississippi, about sixteen miles from Downtown Memphis and the FedExForum, across the Tennessee-Mississippi border. On May 30, 2017, it was announced that Glynn Cyprien would be the head coach and Chris Makris the general manager of the team. On June 1, 2017, the Memphis Grizzlies unveiled their new NBA Development League affiliate team name and logo as the Memphis Hustle. The Hustle made the postseason in the 2022–23 season for the second time in franchise history. Uniquely, they hosted the Semifinal game at the FedExForum in Memphis, Tennessee.

== Season by season ==
Season	Division	Regular season				Playoffs
Season	Division	Finish	Wins	Losses	Pct.	Playoffs
2017–18	Midwest	4th	21	29	.420	
2018–19	Midwest	2nd	28	22	.560	Won First Round (Stockton) 122–119; Lost Conference Semifinal (Rio Grande Valley) 118–135
2019–20	Midwest	1st	26	15	.634	Season cancelled by COVID-19 pandemic
2020–21	Midwest	12th	6	9	.400	
2021–22	Western	9th	15	19	.441	
2022–23	Western	2nd	23	9	.719	Lost Conference Semifinal (Rio Grande Valley) 108–110
2023–24	Western	12th	15	19	.441	
2024–25	Western	11th	15	19	.441	
Regular season record			149	141	.514	
Playoff record			1	2	.333	

== Current roster ==
Memphis Hustle roster
Players

Pos.	No.	Player	Height	Weight	DOB	From
G	23	Tommy Bruner	6 ft 1 in (1.85 m)	180 lb (82 kg)	2001-04-21	Denver
G	99	Yuri Collins	6 ft 0 in (1.83 m)	190 lb (86 kg)	2001-03-07	Saint Louis
F	43	Eric Dixon	6 ft 7 in (2.01 m)	260 lb (118 kg)	2001-01-26	Villanova
C	34	Lawson Lovering	7 ft 0 in (2.13 m)	235 lb (107 kg)	2003-05-29	Utah
G	21	Jahmai Mashack (TW)	6 ft 4 in (1.93 m)	203 lb (92 kg)	2002-11-10	Tennessee
C	7	Orlando Robinson	6 ft 10 in (2.08 m)	235 lb (107 kg)	2000-07-10	Fresno State
G	10	Javon Small (TW)	6 ft 3 in (1.91 m)	190 lb (86 kg)	2002-12-19	West Virginia
F	1	Lahat Thioune	6 ft 10 in (2.08 m)	224 lb (102 kg)	1999-11-02	South Dakota
G/F	95	Kalil Thomas	6 ft 5 in (1.96 m)	200 lb (91 kg)	2001-03-02	Morehead State

Coaches
Head coach
- T. C. Swirsky
Assistant(s)
- Danielle Boiago
- Nick Covington
- Jack Hostetler
- Rob Sanicola

Legend
- (DP) Unsigned draft pick
- (FA) Free agent
- (S) Suspended
- (P) Prospects
- (NBA) On assignment from NBA affiliate
- (TW) Two-way affiliate player
- Injured

Roster
Updated: July 1, 2026

== Head coaches ==
Overview of Memphis Hustle coaches
Head coach	Term	Regular season				Playoffs			
Head coach	Term	G	W	L	Win%	G	W	L	Win%
Glynn Cyprien	2017–2018	50	21	29	.420	—	—	—	—
Brad Jones	2018–2019	50	28	22	.560	2	1	1	.500
Jason March	2019–2024	122	85	71	.545	1	0	1	.000
T. C. Swirsky	2024–2025	34	15	19	.441	—	—	—	—
Rob Sanicola	2025–present				–	—	—	—	—

== Accomplishments ==
=== NBA G League Rookie of the Year ===
- Kenneth Lofton Jr. – 2023 (TW)

=== All-NBA G League First Team ===
- Jarrod Uthoff – 2020

=== All-NBA G League Third Team ===
- Dusty Hannahs – 2020

=== Rising Stars Challenge ===
- Kenneth Lofton Jr. – 2023 (TW)

== NBA affiliates ==
- Memphis Grizzlies (2017–present)
