= 2025–26 Houston Cougars men's basketball team =

American college basketball season

2025–26 Houston Cougars men's basketball

NCAA tournament, Sweet Sixteen
- Conference: Big 12 Conference

Ranking
- Coaches: No. 6
- AP: No. 7
- Record: 30–7 (14–4 Big 12)
- Head coach: Kelvin Sampson (12th season)
- Assistant coaches: K.C. Beard; Mike Ekanem; Hollis Price; Kellen Sampson
- Home arena: Fertitta Center

2025–26 Big 12 men's basketball standings
	Conf.				Overall
Team	W		L	PCT	W		L	PCT
No. 3 Arizona †	16	–	2	.889	36	–	3	.923
No. 7 Houston	14	–	4	.778	30	–	7	.811
No. 20 Kansas	12	–	6	.667	24	–	11	.686
No. 21 Texas Tech	12	–	6	.667	23	–	11	.676
No. 8 Iowa State	12	–	6	.667	29	–	8	.784
TCU	11	–	7	.611	23	–	12	.657
West Virginia	9	–	9	.500	21	–	14	.600
UCF	9	–	9	.500	21	–	12	.636
Cincinnati	9	–	9	.500	18	–	15	.545
BYU	9	–	9	.500	23	–	12	.657
Colorado	7	–	11	.389	17	–	16	.515
Arizona State	7	–	11	.389	17	–	16	.515
Baylor	6	–	12	.333	17	–	17	.500
Oklahoma State	6	–	12	.333	20	–	15	.571
Kansas State	3	–	15	.167	12	–	20	.375
Utah	2	–	16	.111	10	–	22	.313
† 2026 Big 12 tournament winner Rankings from AP poll

The 2025–26 Houston Cougars men's basketball team represented the University of Houston in the 2025–26 NCAA Division I men's basketball season. The Cougars, led by 12th-year head coach Kelvin Sampson, played their home games at the Fertitta Center as third-year members of the Big 12 Conference.

== Previous season ==
As the No. 1 seed in the 2025 Big 12 men's basketball tournament, held at T-Mobile Center in Kansas City, Missouri, Houston received a bye to the quarterfinals. There, they defeated Colorado, 77–68, to advance to the semifinals, where they would defeat BYU, 74–54, to advance to the championship game, where they would secure a 72–64 victory over Arizona to claim their first tournament title.

As the tournament champion, Houston received an automatic bid to the 2025 NCAA tournament, also as the No. 1 seed. They were seeded in the Midwest region. There, they defeated SIU Edwardsville, 78–40, in the First round, Gonzaga, 81–76, in the Second round, Purdue, 62–60, in the Sweet Sixteen, and Tennessee, 69–50, in the Elite Eight to advance to their first Final Four since 2021. In the Final Four, they overcame a 14-point deficit to defeat Duke, 70–67, to advance to their first national championship since 1984. In the championship game, despite leading for nearly the entire game – the same thing Duke did to them in the Final Four – Houston ultimately lost to Florida, 65–63, denying them their first national title.

== Offseason ==
=== Departing players ===
Houston Departing Players
Name	Number	Pos.	Height	Weight	Year	Hometown	Reason for departure
LJ Cryer	4	G	6'1"	200	Graduate Student	Katy, TX	Exhausted eligibility
Ja'Vier Francis	5	F	6'8"	235	Senior	New Orleans, LA	Graduated
Mylik Wilson	8	G	6'3"	175	Graduate Student	Rayville, LA	Exhausted eligibility
J'Wan Roberts	13	F	6'8"	235	Graduate Student	Saint Thomas, USVI	Exhausted eligibility
Terrance Arceneaux	23	G	6'6"	205	(redshirt) Sophomore	Beaumont, TX	Transferred to NC State

=== Incoming transfers ===
Houston incoming transfers
Name	Number	Pos.	Height	Weight	Year	Hometown	Previous school
Kalifa Sakho	14	F	6'11"	230	Graduate Student	Rouen, France	Sam Houston

=== 2025 recruiting class ===
College recruiting
Name	Hometown	School	Height	Weight	Commit date
Chris Cenac Jr. C	New Orleans, LA	Link Academy	6 ft 10 in (2.08 m)	230 lb (100 kg)	Nov 26, 2024
Chris Cenac Jr. C	Recruit ratings: Rivals: 247Sports: ESPN: (96)				
Isiah Harwell; SG	Pocatello, ID	Wasatch Academy	6 ft 6 in (1.98 m)	210 lb (95 kg)	Sep 12, 2024
Isiah Harwell; SG	Recruit ratings: Rivals: 247Sports: ESPN: (92)				
Kingston Flemings; PG	San Antonio, TX	William J. Brennan High School	6 ft 3 in (1.91 m)	170 lb (77 kg)	Nov 14, 2024
Kingston Flemings; PG	Recruit ratings: Rivals: 247Sports: ESPN: (89)				
Bryce Jackson; SG	Pearland, TX	Shadow Creek High School	6 ft 5 in (1.96 m)	185 lb (84 kg)	Nov 14, 2024
Bryce Jackson; SG	Recruit ratings: Rivals: 247Sports: ESPN: (81)				
Overall recruit ranking: 247Sports: 3 On3: 3 ESPN: 2
Note: In many cases, Scout, Rivals, 247Sports, On3, and ESPN may conflict in their listings of height and weight.; In these cases, the average was taken. ESPN grades are on a 100-point scale.; Sources: "2025 Houston Cougars Basketball Commits". ESPN.; "2025 Team Ranking". Rivals.; "Houston 2025 Basketball Commits". 247Sports.; "2025 Houston Cougars Basketball Commits". On3.

== Preseason ==
The Big 12 preseason coaches poll was released on October 16, 2025. All awards were voted on by the league's 16 head coaches, who could not vote for their own team or players. The Big 12 preseason media poll was released on October 30, 2025.

Big 12 Preseason Coaches Poll

	Big 12 Coaches	Points
1.	Houston	224 (12)
2.	BYU	204 (1)
3.	Texas Tech	200
4.	Arizona	179 (1)
5.	Iowa State	170
6.	Kansas	163
7.	Baylor	137
8.	Cincinnati	120
9.	Kansas State	117
10.	TCU	90
11.	West Virginia	79
12.	Oklahoma State	77
13.	Utah	50
14.	UCF	39
15.	Colorado	37
16.	Arizona State	34
Reference: (#) first-place votes

Big 12 Preseason Media Poll

	Big 12 Media
1.	Houston
2.	Texas Tech
3.	BYU
4.	Arizona
5.	Iowa State
6.	Kansas
7.	Baylor
8.	Kansas State
9.	Cincinnati
10.	TCU
11.	West Virginia
12.	Oklahoma State
13.	Utah
14.	UCF
15.	Colorado
16.	Arizona State

All-Big 12 Preseason First team

Player	School	Pos.	Yr.	Ht., Wt.	Hometown (Last School)
AJ Dybantsa†	BYU	F	Fr.	6'9", 195	Brockton, MA (Utah Prep)
Richie Saunders	BYU	G	Sr.	6'5", 200	Riverton, UT (Wasatch Academy)
Emanuel Sharp	Houston	G	R-Sr.	6'3", 205	Tampa, FL (Bishop McLaughlin School)
Joseph Tugler	Houston	F	Jr.	6'8", 230	Monroe, LA (Cypress Falls)
Milos Uzan†	Houston	G	Sr.	6'4", 195	Las Vegas, NV (Oklahoma)
Tamin Lipsey	Iowa State	G	Sr.	6'1", 200	Ames, IA (Ames)
Darryn Peterson†	Kansas	G	Fr.	6'5", 205	Canton, OH (Napa Christian)
P.J. Haggerty	Kansas State	G	Jr.	6'4", 195	Crosby, TX (Memphis)
Christian Anderson Jr.	Texas Tech	G	So.	6'9", 195	Atlanta, GA (Oak Hill Academy)
JT Toppin†	Texas Tech	F	Jr.	6'9", 230	Dallas, TX (New Mexico)
† denotes unanimous selection Reference:

- Player of the Year: JT Toppin, Texas Tech
- Co-Newcomer of the Year: LeJuan Watts, Texas Tech
- Freshman of the Year: Darryn Peterson, Kansas

=== Award watch lists ===
Listed in the order that they were released

Award	Player	Position	Year	Source

== Roster ==
2025–26 Houston Cougars men's basketball team
Players
Coaches

Pos.	#	Name	Height	Weight	Year	Previous school	Hometown
G	0	Kordelius Jefferson	6 ft 3 in (1.91 m)	195 lb (88 kg)	RS So	Martin HS	Arlington, TX
G	1	Isiah Harwell	6 ft 6 in (1.98 m)	220 lb (100 kg)	Fr	Wasatch Academy	Pocatello, ID
G	3	Ramon Walker Jr.	6 ft 5 in (1.96 m)	215 lb (98 kg)	RS Sr	Shadow Creek HS	Pearland, TX
G	4	Kingston Flemings	6 ft 4 in (1.93 m)	190 lb (86 kg)	Fr	Brennan HS	San Antonio, TX
F/C	5	Chris Cenac Jr.	6 ft 11 in (2.11 m)	240 lb (109 kg)	Fr	Link Academy	New Orleans, LA
G	6	Bryce Jackson	6 ft 6 in (1.98 m)	210 lb (95 kg)	Fr	Shadow Creek HS	Pearland, TX
G	7	Milos Uzan	6 ft 4 in (1.93 m)	195 lb (88 kg)	Sr	Oklahoma	Las Vegas, NV
C	8	Cedric Lath	6 ft 10 in (2.08 m)	265 lb (120 kg)	RS Jr	Balboa School	Abidjan, Ivory Coast
F	11	Joseph Tugler	6 ft 8 in (2.03 m)	230 lb (104 kg)	Jr	Cypress Falls HS	Houston, TX
C	13	Jacob McFarland	6 ft 11 in (2.11 m)	225 lb (102 kg)	RS So	Rancho Verde HS	Moreno Valley, CA
F	14	Kalifa Sakho	6 ft 11 in (2.11 m)	230 lb (104 kg)	GS	Sam Houston	Rouen, France
G	21	Emanuel Sharp	6 ft 3 in (1.91 m)	210 lb (95 kg)	RS Sr	Bishop McLaughlin CHS	Tampa, FL
F	24	Chase McCarty	6 ft 6 in (1.98 m)	220 lb (100 kg)	RS Fr	IMG Academy	Huntsville, AL
G	25	Mercy Miller	6 ft 4 in (1.93 m)	200 lb (91 kg)	So	Notre Dame HS	Sherman Oaks, CA

Head coach

- Kelvin Sampson (UNC Pembroke)

Assistant coach(es)

- K.C. Beard (Boise State)
- Mike Ekanem (Texas Lutheran)
- Hollis Price (Oklahoma)
- Kellen Sampson (Oklahoma)

Legend

- (C) Team captain
- (S) Suspended
- (I) Ineligible
- (W) Walk-on
- Injured
- Current redshirt

Roster
Last update: October 3, 2025

== Schedule and results ==
Date time, TV	Rank^{#}	Opponent^{#}	Result	Record	High points	High rebounds	High assists	Site (attendance) city, state
Exhibition
October 26, 2025*; 6:30 p.m., ESPN+	No. 2	vs. Mississippi State; The Preview CBB Exhibition	W 61–52	−	17 – Tugler	9 – Cenac Jr.	4 – Tied	Fort Bend Epicenter; Rosenberg, TX
Non-conference regular season
November 3, 2025*; 7:00 p.m., CBSSN	No. 2	Lehigh	W 75–57	1–0	24 – Sharp	10 – Cenac Jr.	5 – Uzan	Fertitta Center (7,035); Houston, TX
November 8, 2025*; 2:00 p.m., ESPN+	No. 2	Towson	W 65–48	2−0	20 – Flemings	13 – Cenac Jr.	6 – Uzan	Fertitta Center (7,035); Houston, TX
November 12, 2025*; 7:00 p.m., ESPN+	No. 1	Oakland	W 78–45	3–0	19 – Tied	6 – Walker Jr.	9 – Flemings	Fertitta Center (7,035); Houston, TX
November 16, 2025*; 2:00 p.m., ESPN	No. 1	vs. No. 22 Auburn; The Battleground 2k25	W 73–72	4−0	22 – Flemings	9 – Cenac Jr.	7 – Flemings	Legacy Arena (15,623); Birmingham, AL
November 20, 2025*; 8:00 p.m., TNT/TruTV	No. 2	Rider	W 91–45	5−0	18 – Flemings	9 – Tugler	6 – Uzan	Fertitta Center (7,035); Houston, TX
November 24, 2025*; 5:00 p.m., TNT	No. 3	vs. Syracuse; Players Era Festival Game 1	W 78–74 ^{OT}	6−0	26 – Tied	12 – Cenac Jr.	6 – Flemings	MGM Grand Garden Arena (4,628); Paradise, NV
November 25, 2025*; 5:00 p.m., TNT	No. 3	vs. No. 17 Tennessee; Players Era Festival Game 2	L 73–76	6–1	25 – Flemings	11 – Cenac Jr.	5 – Tugler	MGM Grand Garden Arena (5,110); Paradise, NV
November 26, 2025*; 2:30 p.m., TNT	No. 3	vs. Notre Dame; Players Era Festival Consolation Game	W 66–56	7–1	17 – Sharp	8 – Tugler	5 – Flemings	MGM Grand Garden Arena (1,629); Paradise, NV
December 6, 2025*; 7:00 p.m., Peacock	No. 8	vs. Florida State; Houston Hoops Showdown	W 82–67	8–1	27 – Sharp	10 – Cenac Jr.	8 – Uzan	Toyota Center (7,121); Houston, TX
December 10, 2025*; 7:00 p.m., ESPN+	No. 7	Jackson State	W 80–38	9–1	23 – Sharp	7 – McCarty	6 – Flemings	Fertitta Center (7,035); Houston, TX
December 13, 2025*; 2:00 p.m., ESPN+	No. 7	New Orleans	W 99–57	10–1	15 – Tied	6 – Tied	10 – Uzan	Fertitta Center (7,035); Houston, TX
December 20, 2025*; 4:30 p.m., CBS	No. 8	vs. No. 14 Arkansas; Never Forget Tribute Classic	W 94–85	11–1	22 – Sharp	7 – Cenac Jr.	5 – Flemings	Prudential Center (6,246); Newark, NJ
December 29, 2025*; 7:00 p.m., ESPN+	No. 8	Middle Tennessee	W 69–60	12–1	15 – Flemings	6 – Tied	5 – Flemings	Fertitta Center (7,035); Houston, TX
Big 12 regular season
January 3, 2026; 1:00 p.m., FOX	No. 8	at Cincinnati	W 67–60	13–1 (1–0)	19 – Flemings	8 – Cenac Jr.	6 – Flemings	Fifth Third Arena (11,062); Cincinnati, OH
January 6, 2026; 8:00 p.m., FS1	No. 7	No. 14 Texas Tech	W 69–65	14–1 (2–0)	23 – Flemings	11 – Cenac Jr.	5 – Flemings	Fertitta Center (7,035); Houston, TX
January 10, 2026; 12:00 p.m., Peacock	No. 7	at Baylor	W 77–55	15–1 (3–0)	17 – Sharp	11 – Tugler	7 – Flemings	Foster Pavilion (7,335); Waco, TX
January 13, 2026; 7:30 p.m., FS1	No. 7	West Virginia	W 77–48	16–1 (4–0)	17 – Uzan	10 – Cenac Jr.	7 – Flemings	Fertitta Center (7,035); Houston, TX
January 18, 2026; 5:30 p.m., ESPN	No. 7	Arizona State	W 103–73	17–1 (5–0)	20 – Flemings	8 – Cenac Jr.	8 – Flemings	Fertitta Center (7,035); Houston, TX
January 24, 2026; 1:00 p.m., ESPN	No. 6	at No. 12 Texas Tech; College GameDay	L 86–90	17–2 (5–1)	42 – Flemings	7 – Tied	6 – Flemings	United Supermarkets Arena (15,098); Lubbock, TX
January 28, 2026; 8:00 p.m., ESPN2	No. 10	at TCU	W 79–70	18–2 (6–1)	27 – Flemings	14 – Cenac Jr.	5 – Flemings	Schollmaier Arena (6,863); Fort Worth, TX
January 31, 2026; 11:00 a.m., FOX	No. 10	Cincinnati	W 76–54	19–2 (7–1)	16 – Uzan	6 – Tugler	6 – Flemings	Fertitta Center (7,035); Houston, TX
February 4, 2026; 6:00 p.m., FS1	No. 8	UCF	W 79–55	20–2 (8–1)	18 – Flemings	10 – Cenac Jr.	6 – Flemings	Fertitta Center (7,035); Houston, TX
February 7, 2026; 9:30 p.m., ESPN	No. 8	at No. 16 BYU	W 77–66	21–2 (9–1)	19 – Flemings	6 – Tugler	5 – Tied	Marriott Center (18,177); Provo, UT
February 10, 2026; 8:00 p.m., ESPN2	No. 3	at Utah	W 66–52	22–2 (10–1)	27 – Sharp	5 – Tied	4 – Flemings	Jon M. Huntsman Center (7,111); Salt Lake City, UT
February 14, 2026; 3:00 p.m., Peacock	No. 3	Kansas State	W 78–64	23–2 (11–1)	23 – Sharp	7 – Flemings	8 – Uzan	Fertitta Center (7,035); Houston, TX
February 16, 2026; 8:00 p.m., ESPN	No. 2	at No. 6 Iowa State	L 67–70	23–3 (11–2)	22 – Flemings	12 – Cenac Jr.	6 – Uzan	Hilton Coliseum (14,267); Ames, IA
February 21, 2026; 2:00 p.m., ABC	No. 2	No. 4 Arizona	L 66–73	23–4 (11–3)	17 – Flemings	13 – Cenac Jr.	4 – Flemings	Fertitta Center (7,887); Houston, TX
February 23, 2026; 8:00 p.m., ESPN	No. 5	at No. 14 Kansas	L 56–69	23–5 (11–4)	16 – Flemings	7 – Tied	3 – Uzan	Allen Fieldhouse (15,300); Lawrence, KS
February 28, 2026; 11:00 a.m., ESPN2	No. 5	Colorado	W 102–62	24–5 (12–4)	26 – Uzan	8 – Miller	8 – Flemings	Fertitta Center (7,035); Houston, TX
March 4, 2026; 8:00 p.m., ESPN2	No. 7	Baylor	W 77–64	25–5 (13–4)	21 – Flemings	6 – Tugler	7 – Flemings	Fertitta Center (7,035); Houston, TX
March 7, 2026; 11:00 a.m., CBS	No. 7	at Oklahoma State	W 82–75	26–5 (14–4)	20 – McCarty	6 – Tugler	9 – Flemings	Gallagher-Iba Arena (6,200); Stillwater, OK
Big 12 tournament
March 12, 2026; 6:00 p.m., ESPN2	(2) No. 5	vs. (10) BYU; Quarterfinal	W 73–66	27–5	17 – Flemings	8 – Tugler	4 – Tied	T-Mobile Center (17,015); Kansas City, MO
March 13, 2026; 8:30 p.m., ESPN	(2) No. 5	vs. (3) No. 14 Kansas; Semifinal	W 69–47	28–5	21 – Flemings	14 – Cenac Jr.	3 – Tied	T-Mobile Center (19,450); Kansas City, MO
March 14, 2026; 5:00 p.m., ESPN	(2) No. 5	vs. (1) No. 2 Arizona; Championship	L 74–79	28–6	20 – Tugler	10 – Tugler	7 – Flemings	T-Mobile Center (11,696); Kansas City, MO
NCAA tournament
March 19, 2026*; 9:10 p.m., truTV	(2 S) No. 5	vs. (15 S) Idaho; First round	W 78–47	29–6	18 – Flemings	18 – Cenac Jr.	4 – Flemings	Paycom Center (13,815); Oklahoma City, OK
March 21, 2026*; 5:10 p.m., TNT	(2 S) No. 5	vs. (10 S) Texas A&M; Second round	W 88–57	30–6	18 – Sharp	9 – Cenac Jr.	4 – Tied	Paycom Center (14,887); Oklahoma City, OK
March 26, 2026*; 9:05 p.m., TBS/truTV	(2 S) No. 5	vs. (3 S) No. 13 Illinois; Sweet Sixteen	L 55–65	30–7	17 – Sharp	10 – Cenac Jr.	5 – Tied	Toyota Center (17,307); Houston, TX
*Non-conference game. ^{#}Rankings from AP poll. (#) Tournament seedings in parentheses. S=South. All times are in Central Time.

== Rankings ==
Ranking movements Legend: ██ Increase in ranking ██ Decrease in ranking ( ) = First-place votes
	Week																				
Poll	Pre	1	2	3	4	5	6	7	8	9	10	11	12	13	14	15	16	17	18	19	Final
AP	2 (16)	1 (18)	2 (12)	3 (4)	8	7	8	8	8	7	7	6	10	8	3	2 (1)	5	7	5	5	7
Coaches	2 (12)	2 (7)	2 (9)	2 (2)	7	8	8	8	8	7	7	6	7	8	3	2	4	6	5	5	6
