= 2026 NCAA Men's Basketball All-Americans =

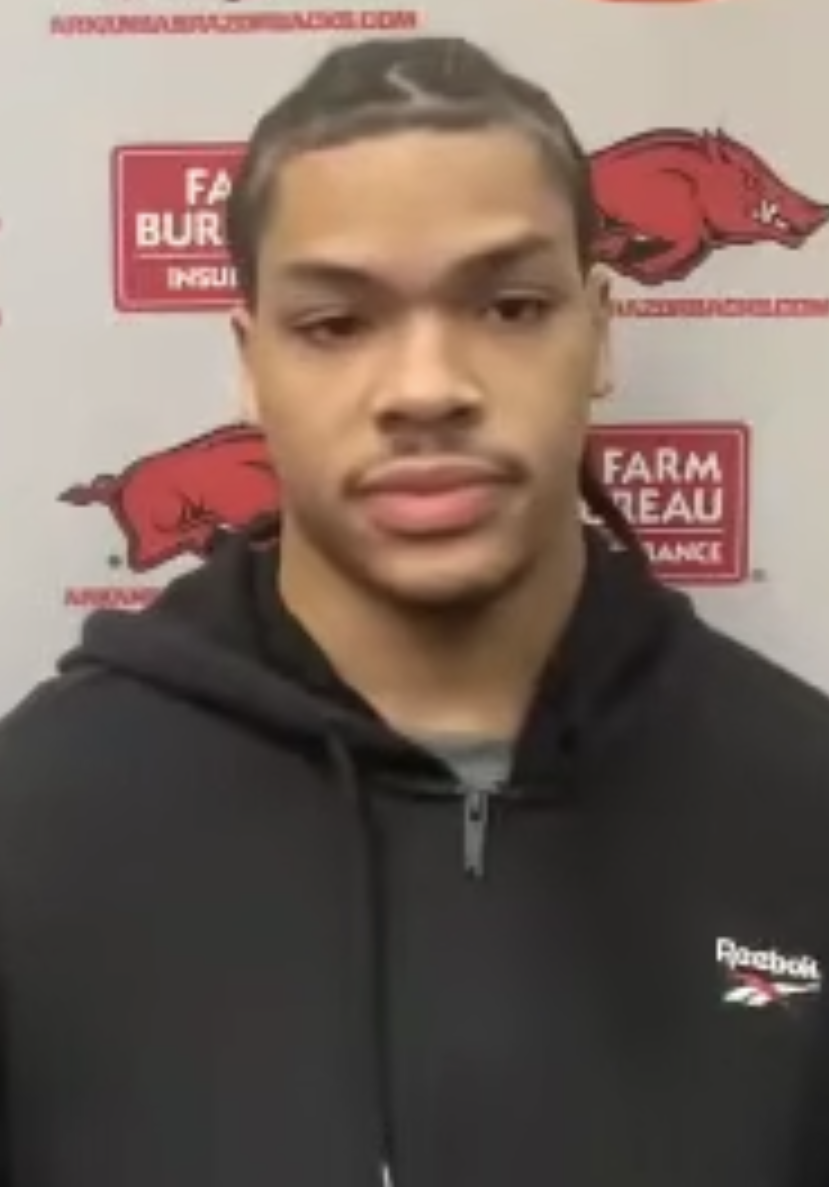
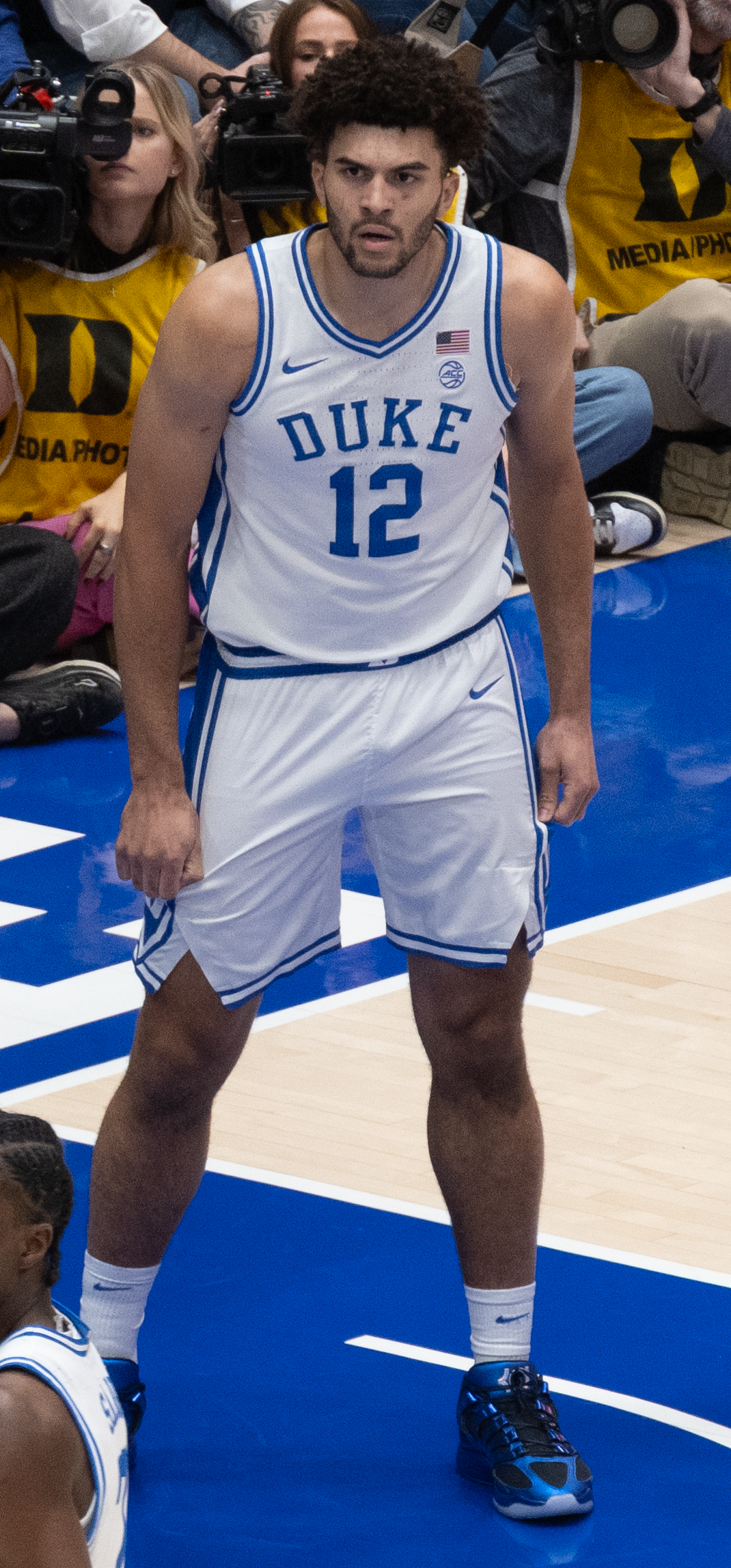
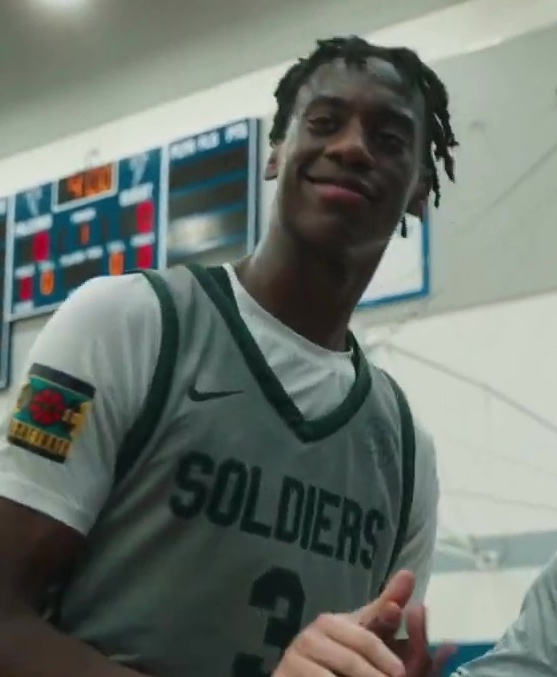
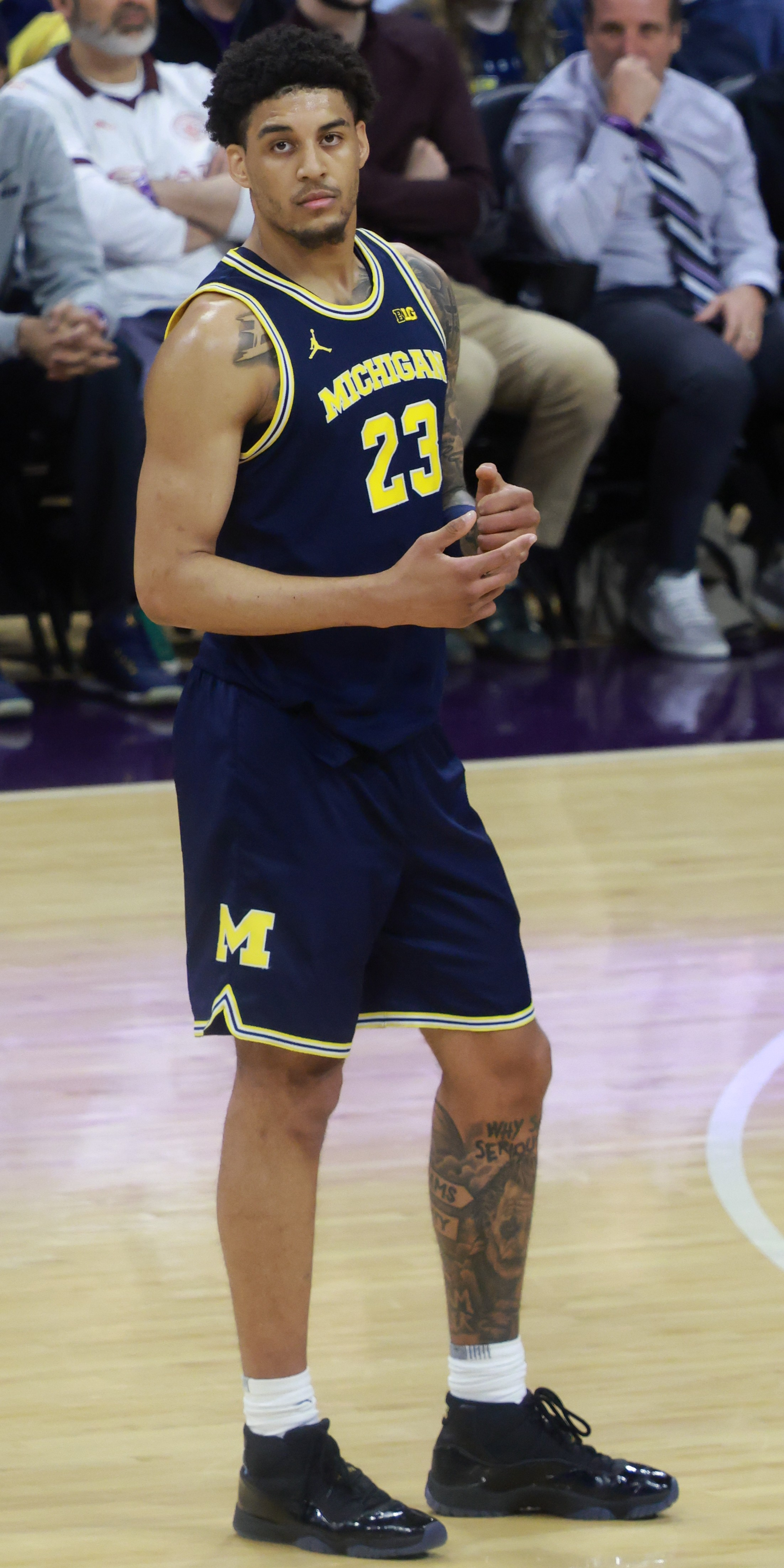
- Members of the 2026 Consensus All-America first team. Clockwise from upper left: Acuff, Boozer, Lendeborg, Dybantsa; (not pictured: Smith).
- Awarded for: 2025–26 NCAA Division I men's basketball season

An All-American team is an honorary sports team composed of the best college players of a specific season for each team position—who in turn are given the honorific "All-America" and typically referred to as "All-American athletes", or simply "All-Americans". Although the honorees generally do not compete together as a unit, the term is used in U.S. team sports to refer to players who are selected by members of the national media. Walter Camp selected the first All-America team in the early days of American football in 1889. The 2026 NCAA Men's Basketball All-Americans are honorary lists that include All-American selections from the Associated Press (AP), the United States Basketball Writers Association (USBWA), The Sporting News (TSN), and the National Association of Basketball Coaches (NABC) for the 2025–26 NCAA Division I men's basketball season. All selectors choose three teams, while AP and USBWA also list honorable mention selections.

The Consensus 2026 College Basketball All-American team will be determined by aggregating the results of the four major All-American teams as determined by the National Collegiate Athletic Association (NCAA). Since United Press International was replaced by TSN in 1997, the four major selectors have been the aforementioned ones. AP has been a selector since 1948, NABC since 1957 and USBWA since 1960. To earn "consensus" status, a player must win honors based on a point system computed from the four different all-America teams. The point system consists of three points for first team, two points for second team and one point for third team. No honorable mention or fourth team or lower are used in the computation. The top five totals plus ties are first team and the next five plus ties are second team.

Typically the All-American team is predicted prior to the start of a given season by many publications, most prominently by the Associated Press, whose voters later select the official AP team after the close of the regular season. On October 20, 2025 the AP named its preseason All-America team. The only unanimous selection, and also the only guard on the team, was Purdue's Braden Smith. The other honorees were Texas Tech forward JT Toppin, Michigan forward Yaxel Lendeborg, BYU forward AJ Dybantsa, and Florida forward Alex Condon.

== 2026 Consensus All-America team ==
PG – Point guard
SG – Shooting guard
PF – Power forward
SF – Small forward
C – Center

Consensus First Team
Player	Position	Class	Team
Darius Acuff Jr.	PG	Freshman	Arkansas
Cameron Boozer	PF	Freshman	Duke
AJ Dybantsa	SF	Freshman	BYU
Yaxel Lendeborg	SF/PF	Senior	Michigan
Braden Smith	PG	Senior	Purdue

Consensus Second Team
Player	Position	Class	Team
Kingston Flemings	PG	Freshman	Houston
Thomas Haugh	PF	Junior	Florida
Joshua Jefferson	SF/PF	Senior	Iowa State
JT Toppin	PF	Junior	Texas Tech
Keaton Wagler	SG	Freshman	Illinois
Caleb Wilson	PF	Freshman	North Carolina

== Individual All-America teams ==
=== By player ===
Player	School	AP	USBWA	NABC	SN	CP	Notes
Darius Acuff Jr.	Arkansas	1	1	1	1	12	Bob Cousy Award, SEC Player of the Year
Cameron Boozer	Duke	1	1	1	1	12	John R. Wooden Award, Naismith Player of the Year, AP Player of the Year, The Sporting News Player of the Year, Oscar Robertson Trophy, NABC Player of the Year, USBWA National Freshman of the Year, NABC Freshman of the Year, Karl Malone Award, Pete Newell Big Man Award, ACC Player of the Year
AJ Dybantsa	BYU	1	1	1	1	12	Julius Erving Award, NCAA scoring champion
Yaxel Lendeborg	Michigan	1	1	1	1	12	Big Ten Player of the Year
Braden Smith	Purdue	2	1	1	2	10	
Joshua Jefferson	Iowa State	2	2	2	1	9	
JT Toppin	Texas Tech	1	2	2	2	9	
Keaton Wagler	Illinois	2	2	2	2	8	Jerry West Award
Kingston Flemings	Houston	3	2	2	2	7	
Thomas Haugh	Florida	3	3	2	2	6	
Caleb Wilson	North Carolina	2	2	3	3	6	
Jeremy Fears Jr.	Michigan State	2	3	3	3	5	NCAA assists champion
Labaron Philon Jr.	Alabama	3	3	3	3	4	
Christian Anderson Jr.	Texas Tech	3	3		3	3	
Jaden Bradley	Arizona		3	3	3	3	Big 12 Player of the Year
Graham Ike	Gonzaga	3		3		2	WCC Player of the Year

=== By team ===
All-America Team
All-America Team	First team		Second team		Third team	
All-America Team	Player	School	Player	School	Player	School
Associated Press	Darius Acuff Jr.	Arkansas	Jeremy Fears Jr.	Michigan State	Christian Anderson Jr.	Texas Tech
Associated Press	Cameron Boozer	Duke	Joshua Jefferson	Iowa State	Kingston Flemings	Houston
Associated Press	AJ Dybantsa	BYU	Braden Smith	Purdue	Thomas Haugh	Florida
Associated Press	JT Toppin	Texas Tech	Keaton Wagler	Illinois	Graham Ike	Gonzaga
Associated Press	Yaxel Lendeborg	Michigan	Caleb Wilson	North Carolina	Labaron Philon Jr.	Alabama
USBWA	Darius Acuff Jr.	Arkansas	Kingston Flemings	Houston	Christian Anderson Jr.	Texas Tech
USBWA	Cameron Boozer	Duke	Joshua Jefferson	Iowa State	Jaden Bradley	Arizona
USBWA	AJ Dybantsa	BYU	JT Toppin	Texas Tech	Jeremy Fears Jr.	Michigan State
USBWA	Yaxel Lendeborg	Michigan	Keaton Wagler	Illinois	Thomas Haugh	Florida
USBWA	Braden Smith	Purdue	Caleb Wilson	North Carolina	Labaron Philon Jr.	Alabama
NABC	Darius Acuff Jr.	Arkansas	Kingston Flemings	Houston	Jaden Bradley	Arizona
NABC	Cameron Boozer	Duke	Thomas Haugh	Florida	Jeremy Fears Jr.	Michigan State
NABC	AJ Dybantsa	BYU	Joshua Jefferson	Iowa State	Graham Ike	Gonzaga
NABC	Yaxel Lendeborg	Michigan	JT Toppin	Texas Tech	Labaron Philon Jr.	Alabama
NABC	Braden Smith	Purdue	Keaton Wagler	Illinois	Caleb Wilson	North Carolina
The Sporting News
The Sporting News	Darius Acuff Jr.	Arkansas	Kingston Flemings	Houston	Christian Anderson Jr.	Texas Tech
The Sporting News	Cameron Boozer	Duke	Thomas Haugh	Florida	Jaden Bradley	Arizona
The Sporting News	AJ Dybantsa	BYU	Braden Smith	Purdue	Jeremy Fears Jr.	Michigan State
The Sporting News	Joshua Jefferson	Iowa State	JT Toppin	Texas Tech	Labaron Philon Jr.	Alabama
The Sporting News	Yaxel Lendeborg	Michigan	Keaton Wagler	Illinois	Caleb Wilson	North Carolina

AP Honorable Mention:

- Michael Ajayi, Butler
- Jaden Bradley, Arizona
- Brayden Burries, Arizona
- Rueben Chinyelu, Florida
- Zuby Ejiofor, St. John's
- PJ Haggerty, Kansas State
- Ebuka Okorie, Stanford
- Darryn Peterson, Kansas
- Bennett Stirtz, Iowa
- Tyler Tanner, Vanderbilt
- Bruce Thornton, Ohio State

USBWA Honorable Mention:

- Brayden Burries, Arizona
- Zuby Ejiofor, St. John's
- Graham Ike, Gonzaga
- Darryn Peterson, Kansas
- Bennett Stirtz, Iowa
- Tyler Tanner, Vanderbilt

== Academic All-Americans ==
College Sports Communicators will announce its 2026 Academic All-America teams for all NCAA divisions and the NAIA on April 14, 2026. The Division I Academic All-American of the Year is indicated in bold.

First Team
Player	School	Class	GPA and major
Zuby Ejiofor	St. John's	Sr.	3.70, sport management
Sam Hoiberg	Nebraska	Sr.	3.74, sports media and communications
**Tamin Lipsey**	Iowa State	Sr.	3.73, communication studies
Nick Martinelli	Northwestern	Sr.	3.87, communication studies
JT Toppin	Texas Tech	Jr.	3,90, communications studies

Second Team
Player	School	Class	GPA and major
Tobe Awaka	Arizona	Sr.	3.59, business administration
Flory Bidunga	Kansas	So.	3.63, communication studies
Tyler Lundblade	Belmont	Gr.	4.00 (UG)/4.00 (G), business administration
Xaivian Lee	Florida	Sr.	3.62, economics
Nick Townsend	Yale	Sr.	3.95, psychology

Third Team
Player	School	Class	GPA and major
Mason Falslev	Utah State	Jr.	3.65, finance
Bryce Hopkins	St. John's	Gr.	3.56 (UG)/3.56 (G), business management
Carson Johnson	Denver	So.	4.00, marketing
Landon Lewis	Brown	Sr.	3.89, business economics
Robert Wright III	BYU	So.	3.53, communications
