= Texas Mr. Basketball =

Honor awarded to high school basketball players

The Texas Mr. Basketball honor recognizes the top high school basketball player in the state of Texas. The award is presented annually by the Texas Association of Basketball Coaches.

== Award winners ==
Year	Player	High School	College	NBA draft
2026	Bo Ogden	Westlake	Texas	
2025	Kingston Flemings	Brennan	Houston	2026 NBA draft: 1st Rnd, 8th overall by the Atlanta Hawks
2024	Josiah Moseley	Stony Point	Villanova→Texas Tech	
2023	Tre Johnson	Lake Highlands	Texas	2025 NBA draft: 1st Rnd, 6th overall by the Washington Wizards
2022	PJ Haggerty	Crosby	TCU→Tulsa→Memphis→Kansas State	
2021	Zhuric Phelps	Duncanville	SMU→Texas A&M	
2020	Greg Brown	Vandegrift	Texas	2021 NBA draft: 2nd Rnd, 43rd overall by the New Orleans Pelicans
2019	Tyrese Maxey	South Garland	Kentucky	2020 NBA draft: 1st Rnd, 21st overall by the Philadelphia 76ers
2018	Quentin Grimes	College Park	Kansas→Houston	2021 NBA draft: 1st Rnd, 25th overall by the Los Angeles Clippers
2017	Cedrick Alley Jr.	Klein Forest	Houston→UTSA	
2016	Marques Bolden	DeSoto	Duke	
2015	Tyler Davis	Plano West	Texas A&M	
2014	Justise Winslow	St. John's	Duke	2015 NBA draft: 1st Rnd, 10th overall by the Miami Heat
2013	Aaron Harrison	Travis	Kentucky	
2012	Marcus Smart	Marcus	Oklahoma State	2014 NBA draft: 1st Rnd, 6th overall by the Boston Celtics
2011	Le'Bryan Nash	Lincoln	Oklahoma State	
2010	Joe Young	Yates	Houston→Oregon	2015 NBA draft: 2nd Rnd, 43rd overall by the Indiana Pacers
2009	Shawn Williams	Duncanville	Texas→SMU	
2008	Willie Warren	North Crowley	Oklahoma	2010 NBA draft: 2nd Rnd, 54th overall by the Los Angeles Clippers
2007	John Roberson	Plano	Texas Tech	
2006	Nic Wise	Kingwood	Arizona	
2006	Darrell Arthur	South Oak Cliff	Kansas	2008 NBA draft: 1st Rnd, 27th overall by the New Orleans Hornets
2005	C. J. Miles	Skyline	(none)	2005 NBA draft: 2nd Rnd, 34th overall by the Utah Jazz
2004	Jawann McClellan	Milby	Arizona	
2003	Kendrick Perkins	Ozen	(none)	2003 NBA draft: 1st Rnd, 27th overall by the Memphis Grizzlies
2002	Chris Bosh	Lincoln	Georgia Tech	2003 NBA draft: 1st Rnd, 4th overall by the Toronto Raptors
2001	Daniel Ewing	Willowridge	Duke	2005 NBA draft: 2nd Rnd, 32nd overall by the Los Angeles Clippers
2000	Field Williams	Waltrip	Cincinnati	
1999	Chris Ogden	Seminole	Texas	
1998	Rashard Lewis	Alief Elsik	(none)	1998 NBA draft: 2nd Rnd, 32nd overall by the Seattle SuperSonics
1997	Chris Owens	Duncanville	Tulane→Texas	2002 NBA draft: 2nd Rnd, 48th overall by the Milwaukee Bucks
1996	Jerald Brown	Aldine	Texas A&M	
1995	Stan Bonewitz	East Central	Texas Tech	
1994	Andrae Patterson	Cooper	Indiana	1998 NBA draft: 2nd Rnd, 46th overall by the Minnesota Timberwolves
1993	Jimmy Smith	Victoria	Texas A&M→Weber State	
1992	Jason Sasser	Kimball	Texas Tech	1996 NBA draft: 2nd Rnd, 41st overall by the Sacramento Kings
1991	Jimmy King	Plano East	Michigan	1995 NBA draft: 2nd Rnd, 35th overall by the Toronto Raptors
1990	Albert Burditt	Lanier	Texas	1993 NBA draft: 2nd Rnd, 53rd overall by the Houston Rockets
1989	Shaquille O'Neal	Cole	LSU	1992 NBA draft: 1st Rnd, 1st overall by the Orlando Magic
1988	Elmer Bennett	Bellaire	Notre Dame	1992 NBA draft: 2nd Rnd, 38th overall by the Atlanta Hawks
1987	LaBradford Smith	Bay City	Louisville	1991 NBA draft: 1st Rnd, 19th overall by the Washington Bullets
1987	Larry Johnson	Skyline	Odessa JC→UNLV	1991 NBA draft: 1st Rnd, 1st overall by the Charlotte Hornets
1986	Anthony Allen	Memorial	Georgetown	
1985	Lance Blanks	McCullough	Virginia→Texas	1990 NBA draft: 1st Rnd, 26th overall by the Detroit Pistons
1984	Coyle Winborn	Pampa	SMU	

=== Schools with multiple winners ===
School	Number of Awards	Years
Duncanville	3	1997, 2009, 2021
Lincoln	2	2002, 2011
Skyline	2	1987, 2005

== Other versions ==
=== Dave Campbell's Texas Basketball ===
First awarded in 2022 by Dave Campbell's Texas Basketball magazine.

Year	Player	High School	College	NBA draft
2025	Shelton Henderson	Bellaire	Miami (FL)	
2024	Josiah Moseley	Stony Point	Villanova→Texas Tech	
2023	Tre Johnson	Lake Highlands	Texas	2025 NBA draft: 1st Rnd, 6th overall by the Washington Wizards
2022	PJ Haggerty	Crosby	TCU→Tulsa→Memphis→Kansas State	

== See also ==
- Texas Miss Basketball
