= 2025–26 BYU Cougars men's basketball team =

American college basketball season

2025–26 BYU Cougars men's basketball
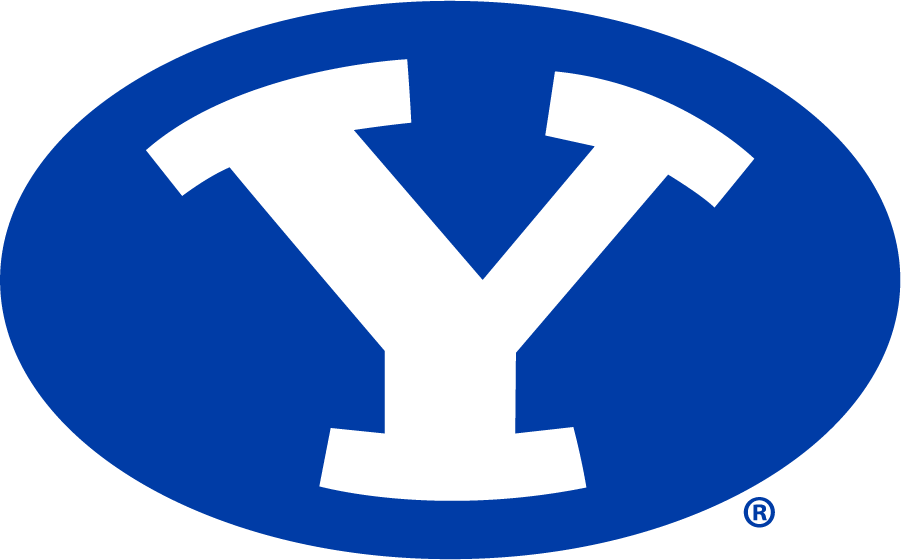

ESPN Events Invitational Magic Bracket champions

NCAA tournament, First round
- Conference: Big 12 Conference
- Record: 23–12 (9–9 Big 12)
- Head coach: Kevin Young (2nd season)
- Assistant coaches: Will Voigt; Tim Fanning; Chris Burgess; Brandon Dunson; John Linehan
- Home arena: Marriott Center

2025–26 Big 12 men's basketball standings
	Conf.				Overall
Team	W		L	PCT	W		L	PCT
No. 3 Arizona †	16	–	2	.889	36	–	3	.923
No. 7 Houston	14	–	4	.778	30	–	7	.811
No. 20 Kansas	12	–	6	.667	24	–	11	.686
No. 21 Texas Tech	12	–	6	.667	23	–	11	.676
No. 8 Iowa State	12	–	6	.667	29	–	8	.784
TCU	11	–	7	.611	23	–	12	.657
West Virginia	9	–	9	.500	21	–	14	.600
UCF	9	–	9	.500	21	–	12	.636
Cincinnati	9	–	9	.500	18	–	15	.545
BYU	9	–	9	.500	23	–	12	.657
Colorado	7	–	11	.389	17	–	16	.515
Arizona State	7	–	11	.389	17	–	16	.515
Baylor	6	–	12	.333	17	–	17	.500
Oklahoma State	6	–	12	.333	20	–	15	.571
Kansas State	3	–	15	.167	12	–	20	.375
Utah	2	–	16	.111	10	–	22	.313
† 2026 Big 12 tournament winner Rankings from AP poll

The 2025–26 BYU Cougars men's basketball team represented Brigham Young University during the 2025–26 NCAA Division I men's basketball season. The Cougars were led by second-year head coach Kevin Young and play their home games at Marriott Center in Provo, Utah as third-year members of the Big 12 Conference.

== Previous season ==
The Cougars finished the 2024–25 season 26–10, 14–6 in Big 12 play to finish in a tie for third place. As the No. 4 seed in the Big 12 tournament, they defeated Iowa State in the Quarterfinals before losing to Houston in the semifinals. They received an at-large bid to the NCAA tournament as the No. 6 seed in the East region. The Cougars defeated VCU in the first round, 80−71. In the second round they defeated Wisconsin, 91−89. BYU lost in the sweet sixteen to Alabama, 113−88.

== Offseason ==
=== Departures ===
Name	Number	Pos.	Height	Weight	Year	Hometown	Reason for departure
Egor Dëmin	3	PG	6'8"	200	Fr.	Moscow, Russia	Drafted by the Brooklyn Nets
Kanon Catchings	6	SF	6'9"	200	Fr.	Indianapolis, IN	Transferred to Georgia
Elijah Crawford	2	G	6'2"	185	Fr.	Augusta, GA	Transferred to UIC
Dallin Hall	30	G	6'4"	200	Jr.	Plain City, UT	Transferred to Virginia
Max Triplett	20	F	6'9"	210	Jr.	Huntsville, UT	Transferred to Cal Poly
Trevin Knell	21	G	6'5"	190	Gr.	Woods Cross, UT	Out of eligibility
Mawot Mag	0	F	6'7"	215	Gr.	Melbourne, Australia	Out of eligibility
Trey Stewart	1	G	6'2"	190	Sr.	American Fork, UT	Out of eligibility
Fousseyni Traore	45	F	6'6"	245	Sr.	Bamako, Mali	Out of eligibility
Townsend Tripple	20	F	6'8"	200	So.	Meridian, ID	Transferred

=== Incoming transfers ===
Name	Pos.	Number	Height	Weight	Year	Hometown	Previous School
Kennard Davis Jr.	SF	30	6'5"	185	Jr.	Saint Louis, MO	Southern Illinois
Dominique Diomande	SF	24	6'7"	190	RS-Fr.	Paris, France	Washington
Tyler Mrus	SF	2	6'7"	205	Jr.	Bothell, WA	Idaho
KJ Perry	G		6'3"	180	So.	Southfield, MI	Citrus College
Nate Pickens	G	12	6'3"	175	Jr.	El Mirage, AZ	UC Riverside
Robert Wright III	PG	1	6'1"	180	Fr.	Philadelphia, PA	Baylor

=== Recruiting classes ===
==== 2025 recruiting class ====
College recruiting information
Name	Hometown	School	Height	Weight	Commit date
AJ Dybantsa; F	Brockton, MA	Utah Prep	6 ft 9 in (2.06 m)	200 lb (91 kg)	Dec 10, 2024
AJ Dybantsa; F	Recruit ratings: Scout: Rivals: 247Sports: ESPN: (98)				
Xavion Staton; C	Las Vegas, NV	Utah Prep	6 ft 11 in (2.11 m)	210 lb (95 kg)	Nov 5, 2024
Xavion Staton; C	Recruit ratings: Scout: Rivals: 247Sports: ESPN: (85)				
Aleksej Kostić; G	Pfaffstätten, Austria	Arkadia Traiskirchen	6 ft 4 in (1.93 m)	185 lb (84 kg)	Jul 23, 2025
Aleksej Kostić; G	Recruit ratings: No ratings found				
Abdullah Ahmed; C	Cairo, Egypt	Westchester Knicks	6 ft 10 in (2.08 m)	220 lb (100 kg)	Nov 12, 2025
Abdullah Ahmed; C	Recruit ratings: No ratings found				
Overall recruit ranking: Scout: 18 Rivals: 18 ESPN: 13
Note: In many cases, Scout, Rivals, 247Sports, On3, and ESPN may conflict in their listings of height and weight.; In these cases, the average was taken. ESPN grades are on a 100-point scale.; Sources: "ESPN". ESPN.; "2025 Team Ranking". Rivals.

== Roster ==
2025–26 BYU Cougars men's basketball team
Players
Coaches

Pos.	#	Name	Height	Weight	Year	Previous school	Hometown
G	1	Robert Wright III	6 ft 1 in (1.85 m)	183 lb (83 kg)	So	Baylor	Wilmington, DE
F	2	Tyler Mrus	6 ft 7 in (2.01 m)	205 lb (93 kg)	Jr	Idaho	Bothell, WA
F	3	AJ Dybantsa	6 ft 9 in (2.06 m)	200 lb (91 kg)	Fr	Utah Prep	Brockton, MA
F	4	Brody Kozlowski (injured) (redshirt)	6 ft 8 in (2.03 m)	210 lb (95 kg)	So	Corner Canyon	Draper, UT
F	5	Mihailo Bošković	6 ft 10 in (2.08 m)	215 lb (98 kg)	Sr	Igokea m:tel	Užice, Serbia
G	6	Aleksej Kostić	6 ft 4 in (1.93 m)	185 lb (84 kg)	Fr	Arkadia Traiskirchen	Pfaffstätten, Austria
F	7	Khadim Mboup	6 ft 9 in (2.06 m)	215 lb (98 kg)	RS Fr	NBA Academy Africa	Dakar, Senegal
G	12	Nate Pickens (injured) (redshirt)	6 ft 3 in (1.91 m)	175 lb (79 kg)	Sr	UC Riverside	El Mirage, AZ
C	13	Keba Keita	6 ft 8 in (2.03 m)	235 lb (107 kg)	Sr	Utah	Bamako, Mali
G	15	Richie Saunders (injured)	6 ft 5 in (1.96 m)	200 lb (91 kg)	Sr	Wasatch Academy	Riverton, UT
F	24	Dominique Diomande	6 ft 7 in (2.01 m)	190 lb (86 kg)	RS Fr	Washington	Paris, France
G	25	Dawson Baker (injured)	6 ft 4 in (1.93 m)	190 lb (86 kg)	RS Sr	UC Irvine	Coto de Caza, CA
G	30	Kennard Davis Jr.	6 ft 4 in (1.93 m)	185 lb (84 kg)	Jr	Southern Illinois	Saint Louis, MO
C	33	Xavion Staton (injured)	6 ft 11 in (2.11 m)	210 lb (95 kg)	Fr	Utah Prep	Las Vegas, NV
C	34	Abdullah Ahmed	6 ft 10 in (2.08 m)	220 lb (100 kg)	So	Westchester Knicks	Cairo, Egypt
G	51	Jared McGregor (W)	6 ft 2 in (1.88 m)	185 lb (84 kg)	Jr	Westlake	Saratoga Springs, UT
G		KJ Perry (redshirt)	6 ft 3 in (1.91 m)	180 lb (82 kg)	So	Citrus College	Southfield, MI

Head coach

- Kevin Young (Clayton State)

Assistant coach(es)

- Will Voigt (Pomona)
- Brandon Dunson (Arizona State)
- Chris Burgess (Utah)
- Tim Fanning (Whittier)
- John Linehan (Providence)

Legend

- (C) Team captain
- (S) Suspended
- (I) Ineligible
- (W) Walk-on
- Injured
- Current redshirt

Roster

== Schedule and results ==
Date time, TV	Rank^{#}	Opponent^{#}	Result	Record	High points	High rebounds	High assists	Site (attendance) city, state
Exhibition
October 18, 2025*; 11:00 a.m., B1G+	No. 8	at Nebraska	L 89–90	–	30 – Dybantsa	11 – Mboup	5 – Wright III	Pinnacle Bank Arena (14,992); Lincoln, NE
October 24, 2025*; 7:00 p.m., ESPN+	No. 8	vs. No. 25 North Carolina; The Bad Boy Mowers Series - Salt Lake City	W 78–76	–	18 – Dybantsa	10 – Keita	5 – Wright III	Delta Center (9,030); Salt Lake City, UT
Non-conference regular season
November 3, 2025*; 7:30 p.m., TNT/TruTV	No. 8	vs. Villanova; Hall of Fame Series − Las Vegas	W 71–66	1–0	21 – Dybantsa	7 – Tied	3 – Tied	T-Mobile Arena (16,704); Paradise, NV
November 8, 2025*; 7:00 p.m., ESPN+	No. 8	Holy Cross	W 98–53	2–0	20 – Saunders	8 – Dybantsa	3 – Tied	Marriott Center (17,918); Provo, UT
November 11, 2025*; 7:00 p.m., CBSSN	No. 7	Delaware	W 85–68	3–0	26 – Saunders	10 – Saunders	9 – Wright III	Marriott Center (18,299); Provo, UT
November 15, 2025*; 5:00 p.m., FOX	No. 7	vs. No. 3 UConn; Hall of Fame Series − Boston	L 84–86	3–1	25 – Dybansta	6 – Dybansta	3 – Wright III	TD Garden (16,116); Boston, MA
November 21, 2025*; 2:00 p.m., Peacock/NBCSN	No. 9	vs. No. 23 Wisconsin; The Bad Boy Mowers Series - Salt Lake City	W 98–70	4–1	26 – Saunders	7 – Wright III	11 – Wright III	Delta Center (8,987); Salt Lake City, UT
November 27, 2025*; 3:00 p.m., ESPN	No. 9	vs. Miami (FL); ESPN Events Invitational Magic Bracket Semifinal	W 72–62	5–1	18 – Davis Jr.	10 – Keita	5 – Saunders	State Farm Field House (4,267); Kissimmee, FL
November 28, 2025*; 7:30 p.m., ESPN	No. 9	vs. Dayton; ESPN Events Invitational Magic Bracket Final	W 83–79	6–1	29 – Saunders	8 – Saunders	6 – Wright III	State Farm Field House (4,135); Kissimmee, FL
December 3, 2025*; 7:00 p.m., ESPN+	No. 9	vs. California Baptist; Delta Center Series	W 91–60	7–1	22 – Tied	14 – Keita	11 – Wright III	Delta Center (9,189); Salt Lake City, UT
December 9, 2025*; 4:30 p.m., ESPN	No. 10	vs. Clemson; Jimmy V Classic	W 67–64	8–1	28 – Dybantsa	9 – Dybantsa	6 – Dybantsa	Madison Square Garden (19,694); New York, NY
December 13, 2025*; 7:00 p.m., ESPN+	No. 10	UC Riverside	W 100–53	9–1	26 – Dybansta	11 – Keita	7 – Dybansta	Marriott Center (17,982); Provo, UT
December 16, 2025*; 7:00 p.m., ESPN+	No. 10	Pacific	W 93–57	10–1	24 – Saunders	10 – Dybantsa	4 – Wright III	Marriott Center (17,936); Provo, UT
December 19, 2025*; 7:30 p.m., TNT/TruTV	No. 10	Abilene Christian	W 85–67	11–1	35 – Dybantsa	10 – Mboup	4 – Tied	Marriott Center (17,958); Provo, UT
December 21, 2025*; 7:00 p.m., ESPN+	No. 10	Eastern Washington	W 109–81	12–1	33 – Dybantsa	10 – Dybantsa	10 – Dybantsa	Marriott Center (17,998); Provo, UT
Big 12 regular season
January 3, 2026; 11:30 a.m., CBS	No. 10	at Kansas State	W 83–73	13–1 (1–0)	24 – Dybantsa	16 – Keita	5 – Wright III	Bramlage Coliseum (11,010); Manhattan, KS
January 7, 2026; 7:30 p.m., Peacock/NBCSN	No. 9	Arizona State	W 104–76	14–1 (2–0)	31 – Saunders	8 – Tied	4 – Wright III	Marriott Center (18,009); Provo, UT
January 10, 2026; 8:30 p.m., ESPN	No. 9	at Utah; Rivalry	W 89–84	15–1 (3–0)	24 – Saunders	14 – Saunders	6 – Wright III	Jon M. Huntsman Center (15,558); Salt Lake City, UT
January 14, 2026; 9:00 p.m., ESPN2	No. 11	TCU	W 76–70	16–1 (4–0)	25 – Dybantsa	10 – Keita	4 – Wright III	Marriott Center (17,983); Provo, UT
January 17, 2026; 6:00 p.m., ESPN	No. 11	at No. 15 Texas Tech	L 71–84	16–2 (4–1)	24 – Wright III	6 – Tied	3 – Wright III	United Supermarkets Arena (15,098); Lubbock, TX
January 24, 2026; 3:30 p.m., FOX	No. 13	Utah; Rivalry	W 91–78	17–2 (5–1)	43 – Dybantsa	7 – Keita	3 – Tied	Marriott Center (18,224); Provo, UT
January 26, 2026; 7:00 p.m., ESPN	No. 13	No. 1 Arizona	L 83–86	17–3 (5–2)	24 – Dybansta	9 – Saunders	5 – Tied	Marriott Center (18,239); Provo, UT
January 31, 2026; 2:30 p.m., ESPN	No. 13	at No. 14 Kansas; College GameDay	L 82–90	17–4 (5–3)	30 – Saunders	10 – Saunders	6 – Wright III	Allen Fieldhouse (15,300); Lawrence, KS
February 4, 2026; 7:00 p.m., FS1	No. 16	at Oklahoma State	L 92–99	17–5 (5–4)	36 – Dybantsa	8 – Saunders	4 – Tied	Gallagher-Iba Arena (7,186); Stillwater, OK
February 7, 2026; 8:30 p.m., ESPN	No. 16	No. 8 Houston	L 66–77	17–6 (5–5)	28 – Dybantsa	7 – Saunders	4 – Tied	Marriott Center (18,177); Provo, UT
February 10, 2026; 5:00 p.m., ESPN2	No. 22	at Baylor	W 99–94	18–6 (6–5)	36 – Dybantsa	9 – Tied	7 – Dybantsa	Foster Pavilion (7,371); Waco, TX
February 14, 2026; 2:00 p.m., FS1	No. 22	Colorado	W 90–86 ^{OT}	19–6 (7–5)	39 – Wright III	13 – Dybantsa	8 – Dybantsa	Marriott Center (18,163); Provo, UT
February 18, 2026; 7:00 p.m., ESPN	No. 23	at No. 4 Arizona	L 68–75	19–7 (7–6)	33 – Dybantsa	9 – Keita	3 – Wright III	McKale Center (14,688); Tucson, AZ
February 21, 2026; 8:30 p.m., ESPN	No. 23	No. 6 Iowa State	W 79–69	20–7 (8–6)	29 – Dybantsa	10 – Tied	9 – Dybantsa	Marriott Center (18,046); Provo, UT
February 24, 2026; 9:00 p.m., ESPN2	No. 19	UCF	L 84–97	20–8 (8–7)	29 – Dybantsa	8 – Dybantsa	7 – Wright III	Marriott Center (18,062); Provo, UT
February 28, 2026; 3:30 p.m., FOX	No. 19	at West Virginia	L 71–79	20–9 (8–8)	23 – Wright III	8 – Keita	4 – Wright III	WVU Coliseum (13,799); Morgantown, WV
March 3, 2026; 7:00 p.m., ESPN2		at Cincinnati	L 68–90	20–10 (8–9)	23 – Dybantsa	7 – Keita	6 – Dybantsa	Fifth Third Arena (12,012); Cincinnati, OH
March 7, 2026; 8:30 p.m., ESPN		No. 10 Texas Tech	W 82–76	21–10 (9–9)	27 – Wright III	11 – Keita	4 – Dybantsa	Marriott Center (18,104); Provo, UT
Big 12 tournament
March 10, 2026; 5:00 p.m., ESPN+	(10)	vs. (15) Kansas State; First round	W 105–91	22–10	40 – Dybantsa	14 – Mboup	6 – Wright III	T-Mobile Center (12,542); Kansas City, MO
March 11, 2026; 5:00 p.m., ESPN2	(10)	vs. (7) West Virginia; Second round	W 68–48	23–10	27 – Dybantsa	7 – Tied	6 – Wright III	T-Mobile Center (12,811); Kansas City, MO
March 12, 2026; 5:00 p.m., ESPN2	(10)	vs. (2) No. 5 Houston; Quarterfinal	L 66–73	23–11	26 – Dybantsa	13 – Keita	5 – Wright III	T-Mobile Center (17,015); Kansas City, MO
NCAA tournament
March 19, 2026; 5:25 p.m., TBS	(6 W)	vs. (11 W) Texas; First round	L 71–79	23–12	35 – Dybantsa	10 – Dybantsa	3 – Wright III	Moda Center; Portland, OR
*Non-conference game. ^{#}Rankings from AP Poll. (#) Tournament seedings in parentheses. W=West. All times are in Mountain Time.

== Rankings ==
Ranking movements Legend: ██ Increase in ranking ██ Decrease in ranking RV = Received votes
	Week																				
Poll	Pre	1	2	3	4	5	6	7	8	9	10	11	12	13	14	15	16	17	18	19	Final
AP	8	7	9	9	9	10	10	10	10	9	11	13	13	16	22	23	19	RV	RV	RV	RV
Coaches	8	7	10	11	10	10	10	10	10	9	11	13	13	14	22	22	23	RV	RV	RV	RV

== Awards ==
Three BYU players received All-Big 12 awards for the season. AJ Dybantsa was named to the All-Big 12 First Team and recognized as the conference's Freshman of the Year, while Richie Saunders and Rob Wright were named to the Second and Third Teams, respectively. Dybantsa was also named a consensus All-American.
