= Perkiomen School =

Independent boarding school in Pennsburg, Pennsylvania, US

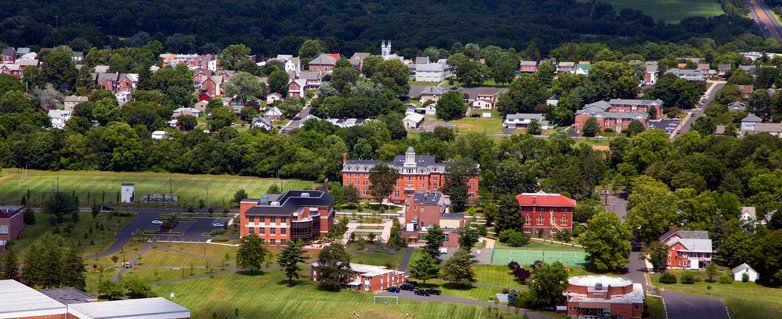
- Aerial view of Perkiomen School in June 2016

Location
- 200 Seminary St; Pennsburg, Montgomery, Pennsylvania 18073-1815; United States; 40.39877°N 75.50330°W

Information
- Former name: Perkiomen Seminary (1875–1916)
- Type: Independent college-preparatory boarding school
- Motto: Latin: Solvitur vivendo (It is solved by living)
- Religious affiliation: Nonsectarian
- Established: 1875; 151 years ago
- Founder: Rev. Charles S. Wieand
- CEEB code: 393190
- NCES School ID: 01197752
- Head of school: Mark Devey
- Faculty: 40.8 (on an FTE basis)
- Grades: 6–12, PG
- Gender: Coeducational
- Enrollment: 330 (2019–2020)
- Student to teacher ratio: 8.1:1
- Campus size: 185 acres (75 ha)
- Campus type: Suburban
- Colors: Purple and gold
- Nickname: Panthers
- Endowment: $9.2 million
- Annual tuition: $70,250
- Revenue: $21.7 million
- Affiliation: NAIS
- Website: www.perkiomen.org

Perkiomen School is an independent, co-educational, college preparatory boarding and day school in Pennsburg, Pennsylvania. Founded in 1875 as Perkiomen Seminary, the school enrolls students in grades 6 through 12 and offers a postgraduate program.

== History ==
=== Founding and early years ===
In 1875, the Reverend Charles S. Wieand, a Schwenkfelder descendant, established a school he called Perkiomen Seminary in Pennsburg. For eight years, Wieand and his wife operated the school. During the Christmas recess of 1883, diphtheria struck the Wieand family, killing three of their four children within five days. Wieand was left severely weakened, and the school did not reopen after the holidays.

=== Schwenkfelder reopening ===
In 1892, members of the Schwenkfelder Church reopened the school on the original grounds, retaining the Perkiomen Seminary name. The Reverend Oscar S. Kriebel, pastor of the Palm Schwenkfelder Church, was appointed principal. The school opened on October 3, 1892, with a faculty of four and nineteen students. Enrollment grew steadily; by 1902, it exceeded 300 students and the faculty numbered nearly thirty.

In 1913, Andrew Carnegie funded construction of a library on the campus, the only Carnegie library donated to a secondary school. The school was renamed from Perkiomen Seminary to Perkiomen School in 1916.

=== Modern era ===
On the night of April 17, 1994, a twelve-alarm fire gutted Kriebel Hall, the original 1875 building that housed administrative offices and classrooms. No students or faculty were injured. The school rebuilt Kriebel Hall at a cost of $9.7 million, funded in part by a $3 million capital campaign, preserving the original facade while modernizing the interior with climate control and network wiring. Students and offices were temporarily housed in trailers during reconstruction.

In 2007, the school opened the Robert M. Schumo Academic Center, which includes science and computer laboratories, a conference room, and additional classrooms. The Carnegie Library underwent extensive renovation in 2010, during which nearly 9,000 outdated volumes were removed to make way for new books and electronic resources. In 2025, the school finished construction of the Helen and DeLight Breidegam Jr. Student Center, which includes Lloyd’s Cafe, Fritz Family Store, several breakout rooms for student use, and multiple new classrooms.

== Academics ==
Perkiomen offers more than 25 Advanced Placement courses and 20 honors-level courses across its curriculum. Average class size is 14 students, with a student-to-teacher ratio of 8.1 to 1. The school reports a 100 percent graduation rate and 99 percent college placement.

The school operates three specialized institute programs in medicine, entrepreneurship, and artificial intelligence, which supplement the standard college-preparatory curriculum.

== Athletics ==
The school fields more than 40 teams across 13 interscholastic sports at the middle school, junior varsity, varsity, and prep levels. Sports offered include baseball, basketball, cross country, golf, lacrosse, soccer, softball, swimming, tennis, track and field, and volleyball.

== Campus ==
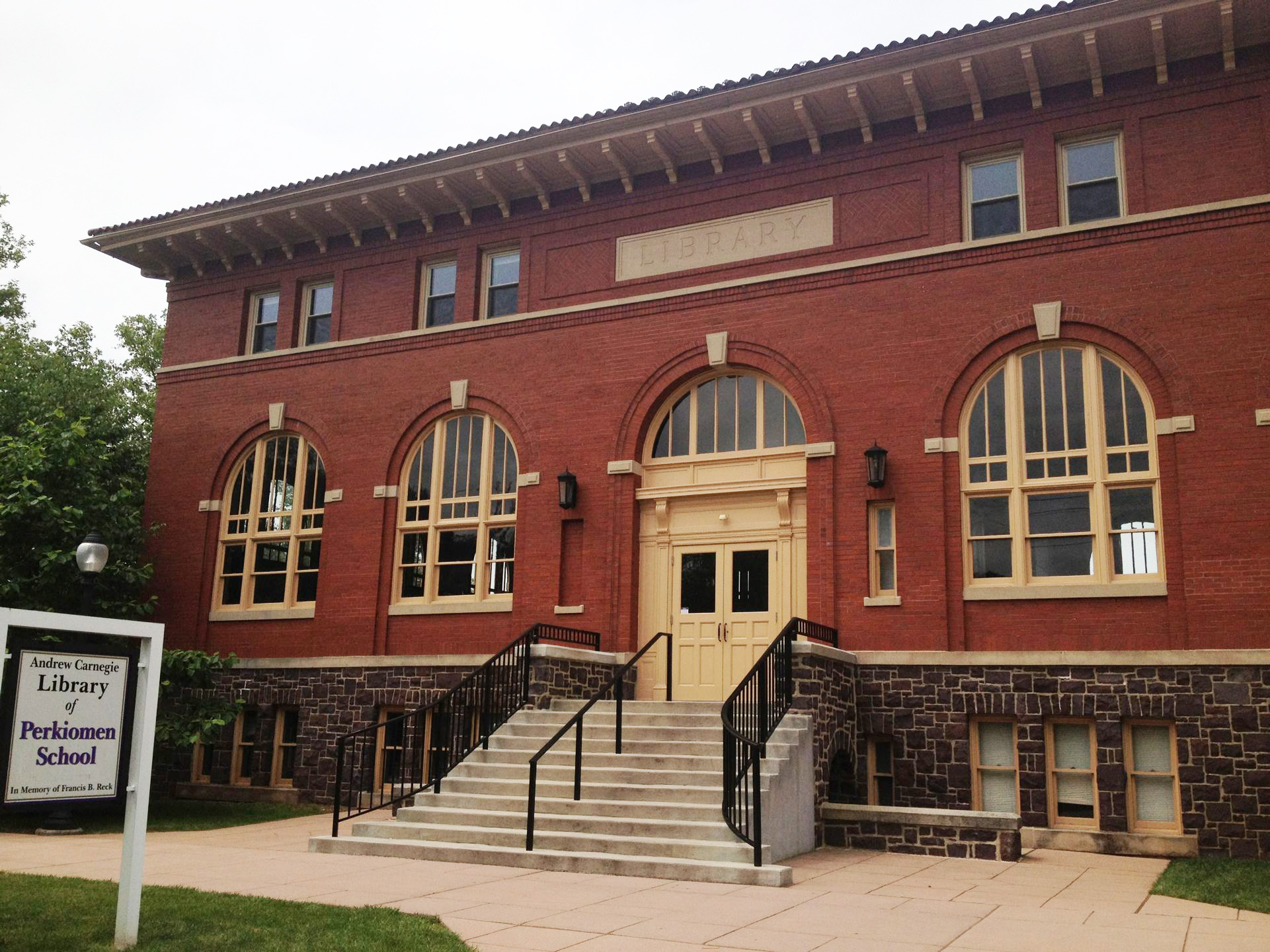
The Carnegie Library, built in 1913

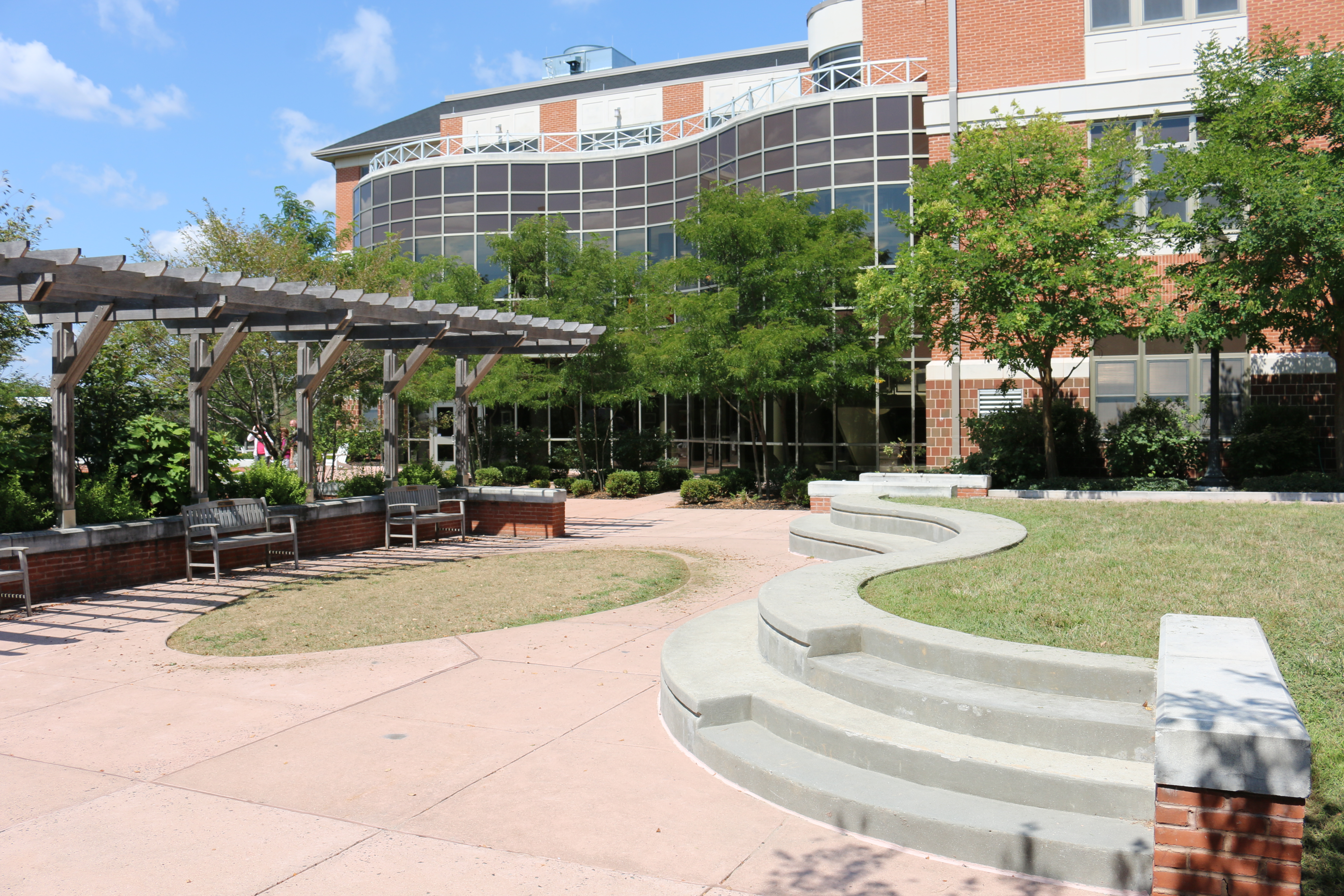
Perkiomen School in August 2015

The 185-acre (75 ha) campus is in Pennsburg, a community in the Lehigh Valley and greater Philadelphia area. The school has six academic buildings, including Kriebel Hall and the Schumo Academic Center, and six dormitories with a dining hall, student center, health center, and faculty housing.

Athletic facilities include a center with a swimming pool, two gymnasiums, weight and wrestling rooms, eight tennis courts, multiple playing fields, and indoor and outdoor batting cages.

The Carnegie Library, built in 1913, is the only library Andrew Carnegie donated to a secondary school. It also serves the surrounding community and holds a collection that was substantially updated during a 2010 renovation.

== Motto ==
The school's motto is Solvitur vivendo, translated as "it is solved by living."

== Notable alumni ==
- John Cecil Holm (1923), actor and playwright
- Monte E. Ford (1977), technology executive, CIO of American Airlines
- Ryan Dunn (2022), NBA player
- Xaivian Lee (2022), basketball player for the Florida Gators
- Thomas Haugh (2023), basketball player for the Florida Gators
- Levi Stoudt, MLB Pitcher in the Philadelphia Phillies Organization
