= Thomas Haugh =

American basketball player (born 2003)

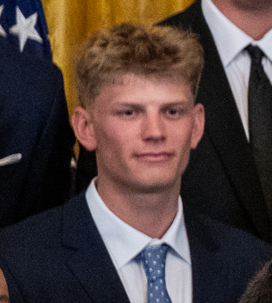
- Haugh in 2025

No. 10 – Florida Gators
- Position: Power forward
- Conference: Southeastern Conference

Personal information
- Born: July 7, 2003 (age 23)
- Listed height: 6 ft 9 in (2.06 m)
- Listed weight: 215 lb (98 kg)

Career information
- High school: New Oxford (New Oxford, Pennsylvania); Perkiomen School (Pennsburg, Pennsylvania)
- College: Florida (2023–present)

Career highlights
- NCAA champion (2025); Consensus second-team All-American (2026); First-team All-SEC (2026)

Thomas Haugh (born July 7, 2003) is an American college basketball player for the Florida Gators of the Southeastern Conference.

== Early life and high school career ==
Haugh was born and raised in New Oxford, Pennsylvania, just outside of Gettysburg. Growing up, he was a multisport athlete, playing football, volleyball, and basketball. He started high school at local New Oxford High School, where he starred on the court, leading his team to a 26-5 record and a state quarterfinal appearance as a sophomore.

He then transferred to Perkiomen School where he played alongside Ryan Dunn and Xaivian Lee. He led Perkiomen to their first state championship win in 2023. Haugh averaged 19 points, 9.6 rebounds, and 4.1 assists while adding 52 steals and 60 blocks that year.

During the AAU season, Haugh played for WeR1 on the Under Armour Next Basketball (UAA) Circuit. Being ranked as high as 167th nationally in the 247Sports' 2023 rankings, Haugh committed to playing college basketball at Florida over offers from Maryland, Northwestern, Illinois, and Richmond.

== College career ==
Haugh saw playing time for Florida as a freshman during the 2023-24 season. He played just under 15 minutes a game, averaging 3.9 points and 3.7 rebounds. Haugh showed the most promise against Georgia, scoring 17 points (3 three-pointers made) and 7 rebounds.

In February 2025, Haugh helped defeat #1 Auburn Tigers with 16 points, 9 rebounds, 3 assists, and 3 blocks. The following game against #22 Mississippi State Bulldogs, he delivered a near triple-double with 16 points, 9 rebounds, 8 assists, 2 blocks, and 2 steals.

The first SEC player to do so since John Wall in 2010 to post a box score of 15+ points, 8+ rebounds, 8+ assists, and multiple blocks and steals. Since that point to close the year, Haugh averaged 12.3 points, 5.4 rebounds, and 2.9 assists a game, helping the Gators earn a one seed in the NCAA Tournament.

Though he did not start on Florida's 2024-25 team, and served the role of Sixth Man, Haugh played a large role in the Gators' third ever national championship. He was named to the 2025 West Region's All-Tournament Team after tallying 13.2 points, 7.5 rebounds, and 3 assists in four games. He helped lead the Gators' Elite Eight comeback victory vs. Texas Tech, scoring 20 points and recording 11 rebounds to secure Florida's sixth Final Four berth in program history in San Antonio. There, he contributed 17 points, 12 rebounds, four assists, and three blocked shots as Florida defeated Auburn in the national semifinals and then Houston in the national championship game.

After returning to Florida and spending his entire junior year with the team, as the lead scorer for the Gators, Haugh was projected to be a lottery pick in the 2026 NBA draft. Despite this, he still chose to return to Florida to play his senior year, according to his conversation with ESPN. He became the first NCAA player since Miles Bridges in 2017 to return to school despite being a projected NBA draft lottery pick.

== Career statistics ==
Legend
GP	Games played	GS	Games started	MPG	Minutes per game
FG%	Field goal percentage	3P%	3-point field goal percentage	FT%	Free throw percentage
RPG	Rebounds per game	APG	Assists per game	SPG	Steals per game
BPG	Blocks per game	PPG	Points per game	**Bold**	Career high

=== College ===
Year	Team	GP	GS	MPG	FG%	3P%	FT%	RPG	APG	SPG	BPG	PPG
2023–24	Florida	36	2	14.8	.450	.255	.457	3.7	0.6	0.3	0.7	3.9
2024–25	Florida	40	5	24.5	.485	.340	.794	6.1	2.2	0.8	0.8	9.8
2025–26	Florida	34	34	33.3	.460	.326	.774	6.1	2.1	1.1	1.0	17.1
2026–27	Florida	7	7	33.1	.576	.514	.784	6.9	2.7	0.6	0.7	17.6
