= 2025–26 Texas Tech Red Raiders basketball team =

American college basketball season

2025–26 Texas Tech Red Raiders basketball

NCAA tournament, Second round
- Conference: Big 12 Conference

Ranking
- Coaches: No. 21
- AP: No. 21
- Record: 23–11 (12–6 Big 12)
- Head coach: Grant McCasland (3rd season)
- Assistant coaches: Achoki Moikobu (3rd season); Jeff Linder (2nd season); Chris Nottingham (1st season); Rem Bakamus (1st season); Toddrick Gotcher (1st season)
- Home arena: United Supermarkets Arena

2025–26 Big 12 men's basketball standings
	Conf.				Overall
Team	W		L	PCT	W		L	PCT
No. 3 Arizona †	16	–	2	.889	36	–	3	.923
No. 7 Houston	14	–	4	.778	30	–	7	.811
No. 20 Kansas	12	–	6	.667	24	–	11	.686
No. 21 Texas Tech	12	–	6	.667	23	–	11	.676
No. 8 Iowa State	12	–	6	.667	29	–	8	.784
TCU	11	–	7	.611	23	–	12	.657
West Virginia	9	–	9	.500	21	–	14	.600
UCF	9	–	9	.500	21	–	12	.636
Cincinnati	9	–	9	.500	18	–	15	.545
BYU	9	–	9	.500	23	–	12	.657
Colorado	7	–	11	.389	17	–	16	.515
Arizona State	7	–	11	.389	17	–	16	.515
Baylor	6	–	12	.333	17	–	17	.500
Oklahoma State	6	–	12	.333	20	–	15	.571
Kansas State	3	–	15	.167	12	–	20	.375
Utah	2	–	16	.111	10	–	22	.313
† 2026 Big 12 tournament winner Rankings from AP poll

The 2025–26 Texas Tech Red Raiders basketball team represented Texas Tech University during the 2025–26 NCAA Division I men's basketball season as a member of the Big 12 Conference. The Red Raiders were led by third-year coach Grant McCasland, and played their home games at the United Supermarkets Arena located in Lubbock, Texas.

== Previous season ==
The Red Raiders finished the 2024–25 season 28–9, 15–5 in Big 12 play to finish in second place. Texas Tech entered as the No. 2 seed of the Big 12 tournament, held at T-Mobile Center in Kansas City, Missouri, they defeated Baylor in the quarterfinals, 76–74. In the semifinals they lost to No. 3 seed Arizona, 86–80. Texas Tech earned an at-large bid to the NCAA tournament as the No. 3 seed in the West Region. In the first round, they defeated No. 14 seed UNC Wilmington, 82–72. They followed that with a solid 77–64 victory over No. 11 seed Drake in the second round. In the Sweet Sixteen, the Red Raiders edged No. 10 seed Arkansas, 85–83 in overtime, advancing to the Elite Eight for the third time in program history. In the Elite Eight, Texas Tech faced No. 1 seed Florida. Despite a strong effort, the Red Raiders were eliminated with an 84–79 loss to the eventual national champions, ending their season.

== Preseason ==
The Big 12 preseason coaches poll was released on October 16, 2025. All awards were voted on by the league's 16 head coaches, who could not vote for their own team or players. The Big 12 preseason media poll was released on October 30, 2025.

Big 12 Preseason Coaches Poll

	Big 12 Coaches	Points
1.	Houston	224 (12)
2.	BYU	204 (1)
3.	Texas Tech	200
4.	Arizona	179 (1)
5.	Iowa State	170
6.	Kansas	163
7.	Baylor	137
8.	Cincinnati	120
9.	Kansas State	117
10.	TCU	90
11.	West Virginia	79
12.	Oklahoma State	77
13.	Utah	50
14.	UCF	39
15.	Colorado	37
16.	Arizona State	34
Reference: (#) first-place votes

Big 12 Preseason Media Poll

	Big 12 Media
1.	Houston
2.	Texas Tech
3.	BYU
4.	Arizona
5.	Iowa State
6.	Kansas
7.	Baylor
8.	Kansas State
9.	Cincinnati
10.	TCU
11.	West Virginia
12.	Oklahoma State
13.	Utah
14.	UCF
15.	Colorado
16.	Arizona State

All-Big 12 Preseason First team

Player	School	Pos.	Yr.	Ht., wt.	Hometown (last school)
AJ Dybantsa†	BYU	F	Fr.	6'9", 195	Brockton, MA (Utah Prep)
Richie Saunders	BYU	G	Sr.	6'5", 200	Riverton, UT (Wasatch Academy)
Emanuel Sharp	Houston	G	R-Sr.	6'3", 205	Tampa, FL (Bishop McLaughlin School)
Joseph Tugler	Houston	F	Jr.	6'8", 230	Monroe, LA (Cypress Falls)
Milos Uzan†	Houston	G	Sr.	6'4", 195	Las Vegas, NV (Oklahoma)
Tamin Lipsey	Iowa State	G	Sr.	6'1", 200	Ames, IA (Ames)
Darryn Peterson†	Kansas	G	Fr.	6'5", 205	Canton, OH (Napa Christian)
P.J. Haggerty	Kansas State	G	Jr.	6'4", 195	Crosby, TX (Memphis)
Christian Anderson Jr.	Texas Tech	G	So.	6'9", 195	Atlanta, GA (Oak Hill Academy)
JT Toppin†	Texas Tech	F	Jr.	6'9", 230	Dallas, TX (New Mexico)
† denotes unanimous selection Reference:

- Player of the Year: JT Toppin, Texas Tech
- Co-Newcomer of the Year: LeJuan Watts, Texas Tech
- Freshman of the Year: Darryn Peterson, Kansas

== Roster ==
2025–26 Texas Tech Red Raiders men's basketball team
Players
Coaches

Pos.	#	Name	Height	Weight	Year	Previous school	Hometown
G	1	Tyeree Bryan	6 ft 5 in (1.96 m)	215 lb (98 kg)	Sr	Santa Clara	Orlando, FL
G	2	Jazz Henderson	5 ft 11 in (1.8 m)	175 lb (79 kg)	RS Fr	Oak Cliff Faith Academy	Dallas, TX
F	3	LeJuan Watts	6 ft 6 in (1.98 m)	225 lb (102 kg)	RS Jr	Washington State	Fresno, CA
G	4	Christian Anderson Jr.	6 ft 3 in (1.91 m)	175 lb (79 kg)	So	Oak Hill Academy	Atlanta, GA
G	5	Josiah Moseley	6 ft 8 in (2.03 m)	225 lb (102 kg)	So	Villanova	Round Rock, TX
G	6	Leon Horner	6 ft 4 in (1.93 m)	215 lb (98 kg)	So	Dynamic Prep	Dallas, TX
G	8	Nolan Groves	6 ft 5 in (1.96 m)	205 lb (93 kg)	Fr	Orono HS	Long Lake, MN
F	9	Luke Bamgboye	6 ft 11 in (2.11 m)	220 lb (100 kg)	Fr	VCU	London, United Kingdom
G	10	Jack Francis	6 ft 3 in (1.91 m)	180 lb (82 kg)	Sr	Anderson HS	Austin, TX
G	11	Jaylen Petty	6 ft 1 in (1.85 m)	170 lb (77 kg)	Fr	Rainier Beach HS	Seattle, WA
G	12	Donovan Atwell	6 ft 5 in (1.96 m)	200 lb (91 kg)	Sr	UNC Greensboro	Huntersville, NC
F	13	Marial Akuentok	6 ft 11 in (2.11 m)	240 lb (109 kg)	RS Fr	Fort Erie International	Edmonton, Alberta, Canada
F	15	JT Toppin	6 ft 9 in (2.06 m)	225 lb (102 kg)	Jr	New Mexico	Dallas, TX
F	21	LaTrell Hoover	7 ft 0 in (2.13 m)	230 lb (104 kg)	Fr	Samuel Clemens HS	San Antonio, TX

Head coach

- Grant McCasland (Baylor)

Assistant coach(es)

- Matt Braeuer (Wichita State)
- Achoki Moikobu (Fort Hays State)
- Luke Barnwell (Newman)
- Jeff Linder (Western State)

Legend

- (C) Team captain
- (S) Suspended
- (I) Ineligible
- (W) Walk-on
- Injured
- Current redshirt

Roster
Last update: October 22, 2025

== Schedule and results ==
Date time, TV	Rank^{#}	Opponent^{#}	Result	Record	High points	High rebounds	High assists	Site (attendance) city, state
Non-conference regular season
November 4, 2025*; 7:00 p.m., ESPN+	No. 10	Lindenwood	W 98–60	1–0	34 – Anderson	16 – Groves	11 – Anderson	United Supermarkets Arena (8,056); Lubbock, TX
November 7, 2025*; 7:00 p.m., ESPN+	No. 10	Sam Houston	W 98–77	2–0	31 – Toppin	14 – Toppin	7 – Anderson	United Supermarkets Arena (13,440); Lubbock, TX
November 11, 2025; 7:30 p.m., FS1	No. 11	at No. 14 Illinois	L 77–81	2–1	35 – Toppin	10 – Toppin	11 – Anderson	State Farm Center (15,544); Champaign, IL
November 14, 2025*; 7:00 p.m., ESPN+	No. 11	Milwaukee	W 80–63	3–1	18 – Anderson	10 – Toppin	7 – Anderson	United Supermarkets Arena (13,126); Lubbock, TX
November 20, 2025*; 7:30 p.m., CBSSN	No. 15	vs. Wake Forest; Baha Mar Championship Semifinals	W 84–83	4–1	21 – Toppin	9 – Toppin	8 – Anderson	Baha Mar Convention Center (2,437); Nassau, The Bahamas
November 21, 2025*; 8:30 p.m., CBSSN	No. 15	vs. No. 1 Purdue; Baha Mar Championship Game	L 56–86	4–2	15 – Toppin	8 – Toppin	4 – Petty	Baha Mar Convention Center; Nassau, The Bahamas
November 26, 2025*; 12:00 p.m., ESPN+	No. 20	New Orleans	W 82–50	5–2	23 – Anderson	16 – Toppin	5 – Anderson	United Supermarkets Arena (10,441); Lubbock, TX
November 30, 2025*; 2:00 p.m., ESPN+	No. 20	Wyoming	W 76–62	6–2	27 – Toppin	9 – Toppin	5 – Anderson	United Supermarkets Arena (10,018); Lubbock, TX
December 7, 2025*; 2:00 p.m., ESPN2	No. 19	vs. LSU; US LBM Coast-to-Coast Challenge	W 82–58	7–2	27 – Anderson	15 – Toppin	8 – Anderson	Dickies Arena; Fort Worth, TX
December 13, 2025*; 11:00 a.m., ESPN2	No. 16	vs. No. 17 Arkansas; Revocruit Rematch	L 86–93	7–3	30 – Toppin	11 – Toppin	10 – Anderson	American Airlines Center (8,277); Dallas, TX
December 16, 2025*; 7:00 p.m., ESPN+	No. 19	Northern Colorado	W 101–90	8–3	36 – Watts	6 – Watts	6 – Anderson	United Supermarkets Arena (9,855); Lubbock, TX
December 20, 2025*; 7:00 p.m., ESPN	No. 19	vs. No. 3 Duke; SentinelOne Classic	W 82–81	9–3	27 – Anderson	10 – Toppin	5 – Anderson	Madison Square Garden (19,812); New York City, N.Y.
December 28, 2025*; 1:00 p.m., TNT/TruTV	No. 15	Winthrop	W 87–57	10–3	27 – Anderson	10 – Toppin	5 – Anderson	United Supermarkets Arena (12,814); Lubbock, TX
Big 12 regular season
January 3, 2026; 12:00 p.m., ESPN2	No. 15	Oklahoma State	W 102–80	11–3 (1–0)	23 – Toppin	14 – Toppin	12 – Anderson	United Supermarkets Arena (13,175); Lubbock, TX
January 6, 2026; 8:00 p.m., FS1	No. 14	at No. 7 Houston	L 65–69	11–4 (1–1)	20 – Petty	11 – Toppin	7 – Anderson	Fertitta Center (7,035); Houston, TX
January 10, 2026; 6:00 p.m., CBSSN	No. 14	at Colorado	W 73–71	12–4 (2–1)	17 – Atwell	13 – Toppin	6 – Watts	CU Events Center (8,232); Boulder, CO
January 14, 2026; 8:00 p.m., Peacock	No. 15	Utah	W 88–74	13–4 (3–1)	31 – Toppin	12 – Toppin	10 – Anderson	United Supermarkets Arena (13,803); Lubbock, TX
January 17, 2026; 7:00 p.m., ESPN	No. 15	No. 11 BYU	W 84–71	14–4 (4–1)	27 – Toppin	12 – Toppin	7 – Anderson	United Supermarkets Arena (15,098); Lubbock, TX
January 20, 2026; 8:00 p.m., Peacock	No. 12	at Baylor	W 92–73	15–4 (5–1)	26 – Anderson	7 – Watts	6 – Anderson	Foster Pavilion (7,349); Waco, TX
January 24, 2026; 1:00 p.m., ESPN	No. 12	No. 6 Houston; College GameDay	W 90–86	16–4 (6–1)	31 – Toppin	12 – Toppin	9 – Anderson	United Supermarkets Arena (15,098); Lubbock, TX
January 31, 2026; 11:00 a.m., ESPN2	No. 11	at UCF	L 79–88	16–5 (6–2)	27 – Toppin	11 – Toppin	9 – Anderson	Addition Financial Arena (8,511); Orlando, FL
February 2, 2026; 8:00 p.m., ESPN	No. 13	No. 11 Kansas	L 81–84	16–6 (6–3)	19 – Watts	12 – Watts	6 – Petty	United Supermarkets Arena (14,953); Lubbock, TX
February 8, 2026; 12:00 p.m., FOX	No. 13	at West Virginia	W 70–63	17–6 (7–3)	22 – Toppin	9 – Toppin	11 – Anderson	WVU Coliseum (12,009); Morgantown, WV
February 11, 2026; 7:00 p.m., ESPN+	No. 16	Colorado	W 77–44	18–6 (8–3)	20 – Atwell	18 – Toppin	7 – Anderson	United Supermarkets Arena (13,246); Lubbock, TX
February 14, 2026; 5:30 p.m., ESPN	No. 16	at No. 1 Arizona; College GameDay	W 78–75 ^{OT}	19–6 (9–3)	31 – J. Toppin	13 – J. Toppin	8 – C. Anderson	McKale Center (14,688); Tucson, AZ
February 17, 2026; 10:00 p.m., ESPN2	No. 13	at Arizona State	L 67–72	19–7 (9–4)	20 – Toppin	8 – Toppin	6 – Anderson	Desert Financial Arena (6,874); Tempe, AZ
February 21, 2026; 1:30 p.m., FOX	No. 13	Kansas State	W 100–72	20–7 (10–4)	26 – Atwell	6 – Watts	9 – Anderson	United Supermarkets Arena (14,644); Lubbock, TX
February 24, 2026; 6:00 p.m., ESPN2	No. 16	Cincinnati	W 80–68	21–7 (11–4)	31 – Anderson	11 – Anderson	7 – Anderson	United Supermarkets Arena (13,858); Lubbock, TX
February 28, 2026; 3:00 p.m., CBS	No. 16	at No. 4 Iowa State	W 82–73	22–7 (12–4)	18 – Atwell	9 – Mosley	7 – Anderson	Hilton Coliseum (14,267); Ames, IA
March 3, 2026; 6:00 p.m., FS1	No. 10	TCU	L 67–73	22–8 (12–5)	19 – Atwell	4 – Atwell	10 – Anderson	United Supermarkets Arena (15,098); Lubbock, TX
March 7, 2026; 9:30 p.m., ESPN	No. 10	at BYU	L 76–82	22–9 (12–6)	23 – Atwell	7 – Watts	9 – Anderson	Marriott Center (18,104); Provo, UT
Big 12 tournament
March 12, 2026; 11:30 a.m., ESPN	(4) No. 16	vs. (5) No. 7 Iowa State; Quarterfinal	L 53–75	22–10	12 – Watts	7 – Watts	4 – Petty	T-Mobile Center (14,745); Kansas City, MO
NCAA Tournament
March 20, 2026; 11:40 a.m., truTV	(5 MW) No. 20	vs. (12 MW) Akron; First round	W 91–71	23–10	24 – Petty	6 – Tied	5 – Anderson	Benchmark International Arena (17,769); Tampa, FL
March 22, 2026; 8:45 p.m., TBS	(5 MW) No. 20	vs. (4 MW) No. 18 Alabama; Second round	L 65–90	23–11	16 – Watts	7 – Watts	3 – Tied	Benchmark International Arena (17,996); Tampa, FL
*Non-conference game. ^{#}Rankings from AP poll. (#) Tournament seedings in parentheses. MW=Midwest. All times are in Central Time.

== Rankings ==
Ranking movements Legend: ██ Increase in ranking ██ Decrease in ranking т = Tied with team above or below
	Week																				
Poll	Pre	1	2	3	4	5	6	7	8	9	10	11	12	13	14	15	16	17	18	19	Final
AP	10	11	15	20	19	16	19	15	15	14	15	12	11	13	16	13	16	10	16	20	21
Coaches	11	11	15	20	19т	16	19	16	16	14	14	12	11	13	16	13	16	10	14	19	21
