= Ryan Dunn (basketball) =

American basketball player (born 2003)

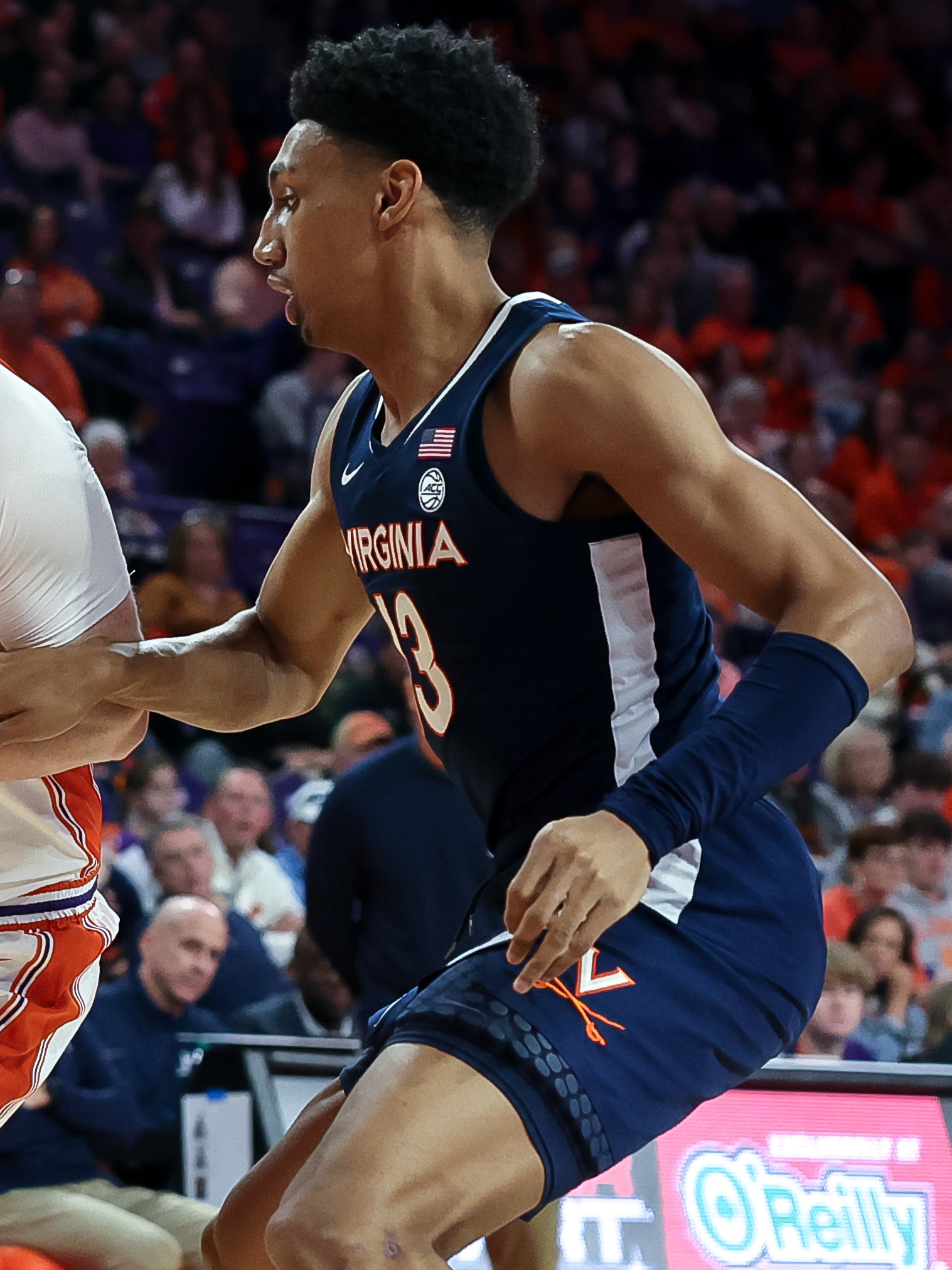
- Dunn with Virginia in 2024

No. 0 – Phoenix Suns
- Position: Small forward / power forward
- League: NBA

Personal information
- Born: January 7, 2003 (age 23) Baldwin, New York, U.S.
- Listed height: 6 ft 7 in (2.01 m)
- Listed weight: 216 lb (98 kg)

Career information
- High school: Oak Hill Academy (Mouth of Wilson, Virginia); Long Island Lutheran (Brookville, New York); Perkiomen School (Pennsburg, Pennsylvania)
- College: Virginia (2022–2024)
- NBA draft: 2024: 1st round, 28th overall pick
- Drafted by: Denver Nuggets
- Playing career: 2024–present

Career history
- 2024–present: Phoenix Suns

Career highlights
- ACC All-Defensive team (2024)
- Stats at NBA.com
- Stats at Basketball Reference

Ryan Christian Dunn (born January 7, 2003) is an American professional basketball player for the Phoenix Suns of the National Basketball Association (NBA). He played college basketball for the Virginia Cavaliers.

== Early life and high school career ==
Dunn grew up in Baldwin, Nassau County, New York. He initially attended Oak Hill Academy in Mouth of Wilson, Virginia as a boarding student, where he played on the school's third basketball team. After his sophomore year he transferred to Long Island Lutheran High School. Dunn averaged 9 points and 4 assists per game as a junior.

After graduating from Long Island Lutheran, he opted to enroll at the Perkiomen School in Pennsburg, Pennsylvania for a postgraduate year. In his lone prep year, he averaged 11.9 points and 7.1 rebounds. At the same time, Dunn tallied 38 steals and 30 blocks in 27 games.

He led Perkiomen to their first-ever state title appearance alongside Xaivian Lee and Thomas Haugh. They qualified for the National Prep Tournament in the same year. Dunn was rated a four-star recruit and committed to play at Virginia over offers from Minnesota, Pittsburgh, South Carolina, Oklahoma State, and Georgetown.

== College career ==
Dunn was a key bench player during his freshman year at Virginia. He averaged 2.6 points, 2.9 rebounds, and 1.1 blocks in 31 games played during his freshman season. Dunn averaged 8.1 points, 6.9 rebounds, 2.3 blocks and 1.3 steals per game as a sophomore. Following the season he declared for the 2024 NBA draft, where he was widely considered the best defensive player available.

== Professional career ==
On June 26, 2024, Dunn was selected with the 28th overall pick by the Denver Nuggets in the 2024 NBA draft, however, immediately on draft night, he was traded to the Phoenix Suns alongside the 56th overall pick in the 2024 draft and second-round picks in 2026 and 2031 in exchange for the 22nd overall pick in the 2024 draft. On July 2, he signed a contract with Phoenix.

Dunn made his NBA debut on October 23, recording two points, two rebounds, a steal, and a block in nearly nine minutes of play in the Suns' 116–113 overtime win over the Los Angeles Clippers held in their new home arena, Intuit Dome. In only his third game played just three days later, Dunn made his first start for the Suns due to a Bradley Beal injury on his right elbow. For that night's game, he scored a then-season-high 13 points as a starter in a 114–102 win over the defending Western Conference champion Dallas Mavericks in the Suns' home opener game. On October 31, Dunn scored a then-season-high 16 points in his second start in a 125–119 win over the Los Angeles Clippers. With the Suns sitting at 15–18 to begin the 2025 part of their 2024–25 campaign, the Suns elected to move Dunn into their starting lineup in place of Bradley Beal, beginning in their January 6, 2025 game against the Philadelphia 76ers. On January 16, Dunn recorded his first double-double of his professional career with season-highs of 18 points (from 8/12 shooting, including 2/3 three-pointers made) and 11 rebounds as a starter in Phoenix's 130–123 win over the Washington Wizards, bringing the team back to a .500 record. On April 11, Dunn scored a career-high 26 points and tied a career-high with 11 rebounds in a 117–98 victory over the San Antonio Spurs.

== Career statistics ==
Legend
GP	Games played	GS	Games started	MPG	Minutes per game
FG%	Field goal percentage	3P%	3-point field goal percentage	FT%	Free throw percentage
RPG	Rebounds per game	APG	Assists per game	SPG	Steals per game
BPG	Blocks per game	PPG	Points per game	**Bold**	Career high

=== NBA ===
==== Regular season ====
Year	Team	GP	GS	MPG	FG%	3P%	FT%	RPG	APG	SPG	BPG	PPG
2024–25	Phoenix	**74**	**44**	19.1	.430	.311	.487	3.6	.8	.6	**.5**	**6.9**
2025–26	Phoenix	70	16	**19.4**	**.453**	**.331**	**.489**	**4.2**	**1.5**	**.9**	.4	5.8
Career		144	60	19.2	.440	.319	.488	3.9	1.1	.7	.5	6.4

==== Playoffs ====
Year	Team	GP	GS	MPG	FG%	3P%	FT%	RPG	APG	SPG	BPG	PPG
2026	Phoenix	4	0	8.5	.000	.000	—	1.5	.5	.0	.0	.0
Career		4	0	8.5	.000	.000	—	1.5	.5	.0	.0	.0

=== College ===
Year	Team	GP	GS	MPG	FG%	3P%	FT%	RPG	APG	SPG	BPG	PPG
2022–23	Virginia	31	0	12.9	.532	**.313**	.500	2.9	.3	.4	1.1	2.6
2023–24	Virginia	**34**	**34**	**27.5**	**.548**	.200	**.532**	**6.9**	**.8**	**1.3**	**2.3**	**8.1**
Career		65	34	20.6	.544	.235	.525	5.0	.5	.9	1.7	5.5

== Personal life ==
Dunn is the younger brother of Major League Baseball pitcher Justin Dunn.
