= Kingston Flemings =

American basketball player (born 2007)

No. 4 – Atlanta Hawks
- Position: Point guard
- League: NBA

Personal information
- Born: January 3, 2007 (age 19) Newport News, Virginia, U.S.
- Listed height: 6 ft 3 in (1.91 m)
- Listed weight: 190 lb (86 kg)

Career information
- High school: William J. Brennan (San Antonio, Texas)
- College: Houston (2025–2026)
- NBA draft: 2026: 1st round, 8th overall pick
- Drafted by: Atlanta Hawks
- Playing career: 2026–present

Career history
- 2026–present: Atlanta Hawks

Career highlights
- Consensus second-team All-American (2026); First-team All-Big 12 (2026); Big 12 All-Freshman team (2026); Jordan Brand Classic (2025); Texas Mr. Basketball (2025)
- Stats at NBA.com
- Stats at Basketball Reference
Medals
Men's 3x3 basketball
Representing the United States
FIBA 3x3 Under-18 World Cup
Gold medal – first place	2024 Hungary	Team

Kingston Elijah Flemings (born January 3, 2007) is an American basketball player for the Atlanta Hawks of the National Basketball Association (NBA). He played college basketball for the Houston Cougars.

== Early life and high school career ==
Flemings was born in Newport News, Virginia and grew up in San Antonio, Texas. He attended William J. Brennan High School in San Antonio. During his freshman year, Flemings averaged 14.7 points, 3.7 rebounds and 6.1 assists over forty games, propelling his team to the UIL 6A Regional Finals. He set a single-season program record with 245 assists, showing his "good vision and instincts as a passer," as noted by his coach. As a sophomore, Flemings averaged 15.0 points, 5.2 rebounds and 5.3 assists per game, leading his team to a UIL 6A Regional title and a state semifinal appearance. He followed this as a junior by guiding the Bears to a 31–5 record and the UIL 6A Regional Semifinals; during that campaign, he averaged 17.4 points, 7.1 rebounds, 5.5 assists and 2.0 steals.

Flemings finished his high school career by returning his team to the UIL 6A State Semifinals as a senior. That year, he posted career-high averages of 20.4 points, 6.8 assists and 2.9 steals per game. He also surpassed his own single-season program record by recording 246 assists, ultimately finishing his tenure at Brennan with a school-record 873 career assists. For his performances, Flemings was named Texas Mr. Basketball, won the Gatorade Texas Player of the Year, was selected for the Jordan Brand Classic, and received Naismith All-America Third Team honors.

=== Recruiting ===
Flemings was a consensus four-star recruit and regarded to be the best player in Texas, according to major recruiting services. On November 14, 2024, Flemings committed to Houston over offers from Alabama, Baylor, Texas, Texas A&M and Texas Tech.

College recruiting
Name	Hometown	School	Height	Weight	Commit date
Kingston Flemings; Point guard	San Antonio, TX	William J. Brennan	6 ft 3 in (1.91 m)	175 lb (79 kg)	Nov 14, 2024
Kingston Flemings; Point guard	Recruit ratings: Rivals: 247Sports: ESPN: (89)				
Overall recruit ranking: Rivals: 17 247Sports: 20 ESPN: 22
Note: In many cases, Scout, Rivals, 247Sports, On3, and ESPN may conflict in their listings of height and weight.; In these cases, the average was taken. ESPN grades are on a 100-point scale.; Sources: "2025 Team Ranking". Rivals.

== College career ==
Flemings enrolled at Houston on June 1, 2025, to participate in the Cougars' summer practices.

On November 3, 2025, in his college debut, Flemings tallied eight points along with two rebounds in a 75–57 win against Lehigh. On November 17, Flemings was awarded the Big 12 Conference Player of the Week and Big 12 Conference Newcomer of the Week after averaging twenty points, eight assists and five rebounds a game in games against Auburn and Oakland.

On January 24, 2026, Flemings scored a season-high 42 points along with six assists and two steals in a 90–86 loss against Texas Tech, setting a new Cougars freshman scoring record. He declared for the 2026 NBA draft after the season.

== Professional career ==
On June 23, 2026, Flemings was selected with the eighth overall pick by the Atlanta Hawks in the 2026 NBA draft. On November 1, he received a one-game suspension without pay for intentionally elbowing New Orleans Pelicans guard Bryce McGowens in the head.

== National team career ==
Flemings represented the United States at the 2024 FIBA 3x3 Under-18 World Cup in Hungary. He helped his team win the gold medal in a 21–13 victory against Spain. He was teammates with Bo Ogden, Amir Jenkins and Nikolas Khamenia.

== Career statistics ==
Legend
GP	Games played	GS	Games started	MPG	Minutes per game
FG%	Field goal percentage	3P%	3-point field goal percentage	FT%	Free throw percentage
RPG	Rebounds per game	APG	Assists per game	SPG	Steals per game
BPG	Blocks per game	PPG	Points per game	**Bold**	Career high

=== College ===
Year	Team	GP	GS	MPG	FG%	3P%	FT%	RPG	APG	SPG	BPG	PPG
2025–26	Houston	37	37	31.7	.476	.387	.845	4.1	5.2	1.5	.3	16.1
