= Robert Wright III =

American basketball player (born 2005)

No. 1 – BYU Cougars
- Position: Point guard
- Conference: Big 12 Conference

Personal information
- Born: November 16, 2005 (age 20)
- Listed height: 6 ft 1 in (1.85 m)
- Listed weight: 183 lb (83 kg)

Career information
- High school: Saints Neumann Goretti (Philadelphia, Pennsylvania); Montverde Academy (Montverde, Florida)
- College: Baylor (2024–2025); BYU (2025–present)

Career highlights
- Third-team All-Big 12 (2026); Big 12 All-Freshman Team (2025); Jordan Brand Classic (2024)

Robert O. Wright III (born November 16, 2005) is an American college basketball player for the BYU Cougars of the Big 12 Conference. He previously played for the Baylor Bears.

== High school career ==
During his high school career, Wright played at Saints Neumann Goretti High School in Philadelphia, Pennsylvania for his first three years before transferring to Montverde Academy in Montverde, Florida. As a junior, he averaged 22.2 points, 5.1 rebounds, five assists, and 2.4 steals per game and was named the 2023 Pennsylvania Gatorade Player of the year. Coming out of high school, Wright was rated as a four-star recruit and committed to playing college basketball for Baylor over other schools such as Miami (Florida), Syracuse, Maryland, Seton Hall, Georgetown, and Louisville.

== College career ==
In his college debut on November 4, 2024, Wright recorded 12 points and six rebounds in a loss to Gonzaga. On December 9, he made his first start in a win against Abilene Christian. On January 28, 2025, Wright notched 22 points in an overtime loss to BYU. On February 1, he scored a career-high 24 points in a 19-point comeback win versus Kansas. On March 4, Wright tallied 11 points, seven assists and two steals in a win over TCU. In the first round of the 2025 NCAA Division I men's basketball tournament, he led the team to an upset win with 19 points over Mississippi State. For his performance during the 2024–25 season, Wright was named to the Big 12 Conference All-Freshman Team.

For his sophomore season, Wright transferred to BYU. He averaged 18.1 points, 3.5 rebounds and 4.6 assists per game and was named to the Third Team All-Big 12. Wright entered the transfer portal after the season but ultimately opted to return to BYU.

== Career statistics ==
Legend
GP	Games played	GS	Games started	MPG	Minutes per game
FG%	Field goal percentage	3P%	3-point field goal percentage	FT%	Free throw percentage
RPG	Rebounds per game	APG	Assists per game	SPG	Steals per game
BPG	Blocks per game	PPG	Points per game	**Bold**	Career high

=== College ===
Year	Team	GP	GS	MPG	FG%	3P%	FT%	RPG	APG	SPG	BPG	PPG
2024–25	Baylor	**35**	21	29.4	.414	.352	.796	2.1	4.2	1.0	**.1**	11.5
2025–26	BYU	**35**	**35**	**34.8**	**.467**	**.410**	**.821**	**3.5**	**4.6**	**1.2**	.0	**18.1**
Career		70	56	32.1	.445	.388	.810	2.8	4.4	1.1	.0	14.8
