= Xaivian Lee =

Canadian-American basketball player (born 2004)

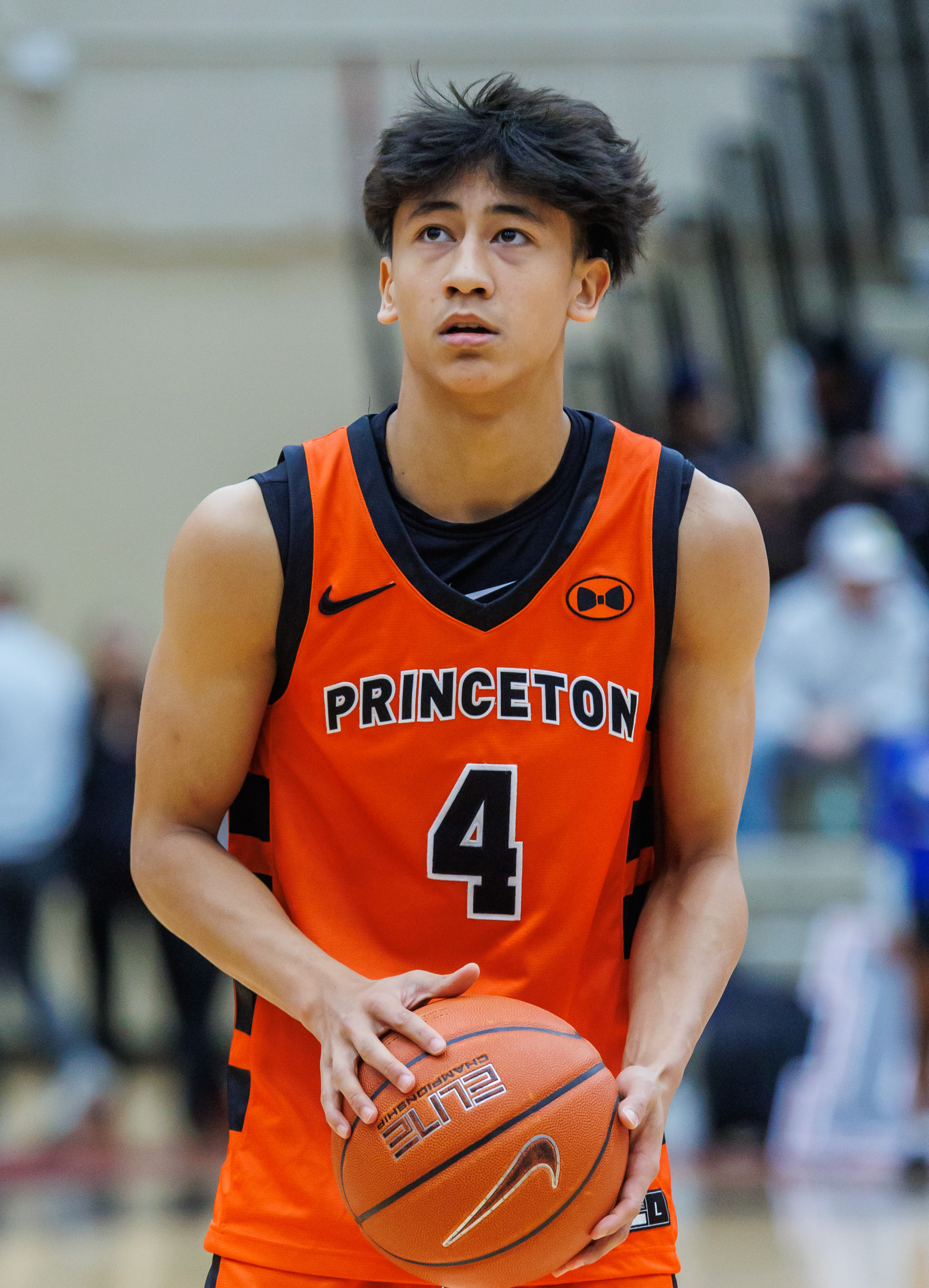
- Lee with Princeton in 2023

No. 5 – Gonzaga Bulldogs
- Position: Point guard
- Conference: Pac-12 Conference

Personal information
- Born: March 12, 2004 (age 22) Toronto, Ontario, Canada
- Listed height: 6 ft 4 in (1.93 m)
- Listed weight: 180 lb (82 kg)

Career information
- High school: Crescent (Toronto, Ontario); Perkiomen (Pennsburg, Pennsylvania)
- College: Princeton (2022–2025); Florida (2025–2026); Gonzaga (2026–present)
- NBA draft: 2026: undrafted

Career highlights
- 2× First-team All-Ivy League (2024, 2025)

Xaivian Lee (born March 12, 2004) is a Canadian-American college basketball player for the Gonzaga Bulldogs of the Pac-12 Conference. He previously played for the Princeton Tigers and Florida Gators.

== Early life ==
Lee was born on March 12, 2004 in Toronto, Canada, the son of Eun-Kyung Lee and Daniel Bernstein. His father was a native of Toronto and his mother was born in South Korea. His mother would later move to Brooklyn, New York and also attended college in Toronto. Lee played both baseball and basketball as a youth and he idolized NBA player Fred VanVleet of the Toronto Raptors. When he was 13, he traveled to Buffalo, New York, to watch Princeton play Notre Dame in the 2017 NCAA Division I men's basketball tournament. In a 2023 interview with Sportsnet, his mother described the experience as crucial in his decision to pursue basketball: "What [could] be a possibility for him in the future became more tangible, being there, seeing that in person. I think it's a bit lovely how it came full circle."

== High school career ==
Lee initially attended Crescent School in Toronto, where he played basketball and was one of the best players in the CISAA. He later attended Perkiomen School in Pennsburg, Pennsylvania. In his lone prep year, he averaged 17.4 points and 4.7 assists in 35 games. He led his team to their first-ever state title appearance alongside Ryan Dunn, Luca Baratta, and Thomas Haugh. They qualified for the National Prep Tournament the same year. Lee also played for CIA Bounce AAU on the Nike Elite Youth Basketball League (EYBL) circuit.

The father of one of Lee's AAU teammates, former basketball player Cordell Llewellyn, contacted the recruiting coordinator and associate head coach at Princeton, Brett MacConnell, recommending he take a look at Lee. The Princeton staff later saw him play during his trip to the United States with his high school and AAU teams in between his junior and senior seasons. "I remember texting Brett after the game and I was like, 'Oh my God. We need him right now,'" said Princeton head coach Mitch Henderson. "He had all the stuff — everything you see now was there: the way he would flow through the game and his ability to make things look simple and easy. The passing, the shooting, it was all there."

== College career ==
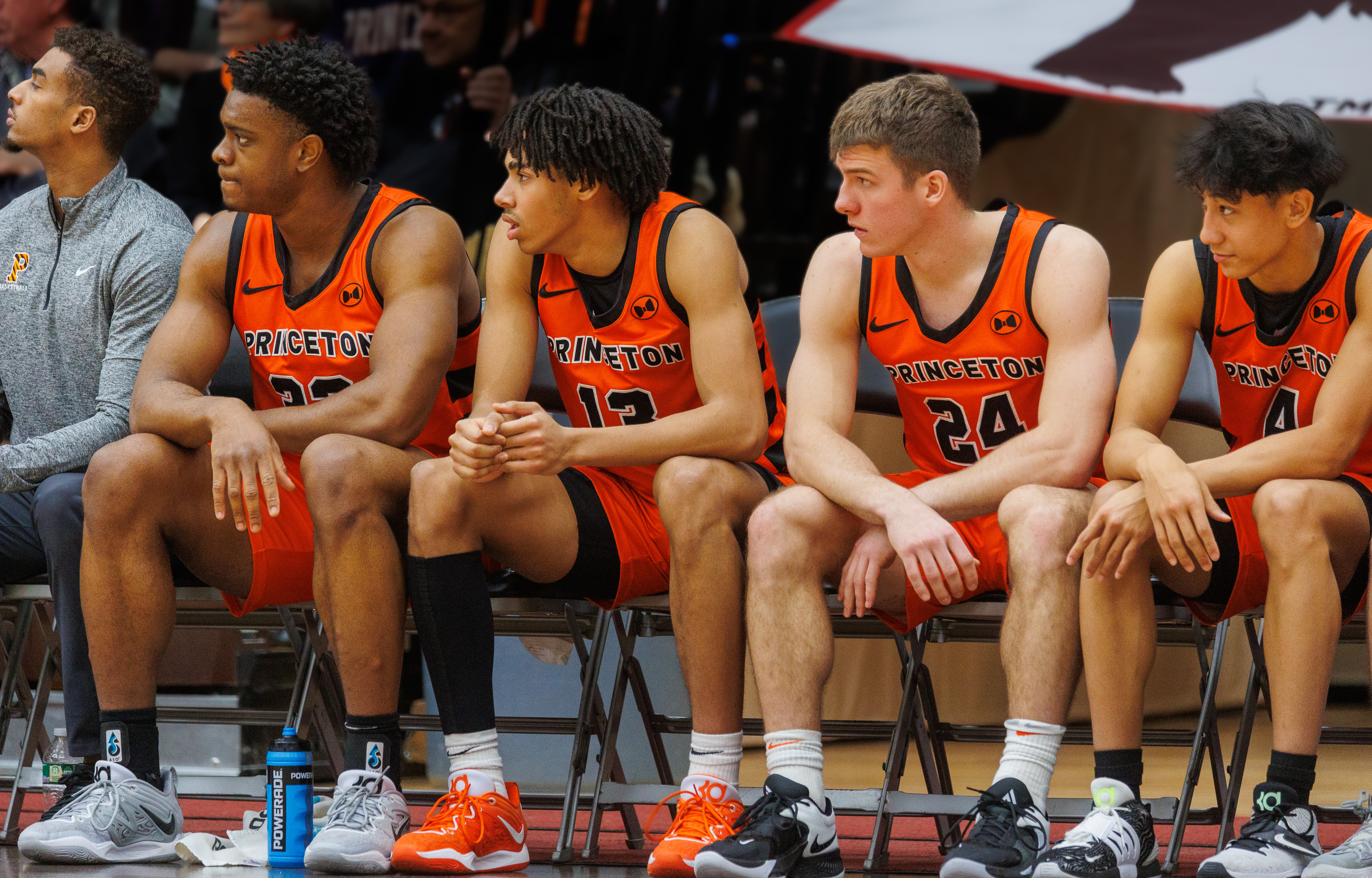
Lee (far right) with his Princeton teammates in 2023

=== Princeton ===
As a freshman during the 2022–23 season, Lee made an immediate impact off the bench. In his freshman season, he appeared in 32 games, averaging 4.8 points, 1.8 rebounds, and 0.9 assists and helping Princeton reach the Sweet Sixteen. He began the following season averaging 19.5 points per game, leading Princeton to a 9–1 record through their first 10 games, the school's best start in a century. In the conference opener against Harvard, he scored a career-high 33 points, in addition to eight rebounds, seven assists, and two steals, being named conference player of the week for his performance. On April 5, 2024, Lee declared for the 2024 NBA draft, while retaining his college eligibility. On May 29, he withdrew from the draft and announced his return to Princeton for a third season. Lee finished his junior year averaging 16.9 points, 6.1 rebounds, and 5.5 assists per game. He entered the transfer portal following the season.

=== Florida ===
On April 16, 2025, Lee announced his decision to transfer to the University of Florida to play for the Gators. In his debut with the Gators, Lee tallied 14 points, six rebounds, and five assists in a 93–87 loss against Arizona. On February 14, 2026, against Kentucky, Lee scored 22 points and made three assists. He was named the SEC Player of the Week following his performance. On May 4, 2026, Lee was selected to participate in the 2026 NBA G League tryouts.

=== Gonzaga ===
In August 2026, Lee was granted a temporary restraining order against the NCAA and granted a fifth season of eligibility after filing a lawsuit in the state of California. He subsequently entered the NCAA transfer portal. On August 26, 2026, Lee transferred to Gonzaga for his fifth season.

== Professional career ==
On June 24, 2026, Lee agreed to an Exhibit 10 deal with the Cleveland Cavaliers. He then joined the Cavaliers for the 2026 NBA Summer League. Following the conclusion of Summer League, Lee averaged 6.4 points, 2.0 rebounds, and 2.4 assists in 16 minutes of game time; he appeared in all five games.

== National team career ==
Lee participated in the 2023 FIBA U-19 World Cup in Debrecen, Hungary, representing the Canada men's national under-19 basketball team. He averaged a team-high 14.1 points to go along with 3.3 rebounds and 3.1 assists per game, helping lead Canada to a seventh-place finish.

== Career statistics ==
Legend
GP	Games played	GS	Games started	MPG	Minutes per game
FG%	Field goal percentage	3P%	3-point field goal percentage	FT%	Free throw percentage
RPG	Rebounds per game	APG	Assists per game	SPG	Steals per game
BPG	Blocks per game	PPG	Points per game	**Bold**	Career high

=== College ===
Year	Team	GP	GS	MPG	FG%	3P%	FT%	RPG	APG	SPG	BPG	PPG
2022–23	Princeton	32	0	13.4	.376	.232	.804	1.8	.9	.5	.1	4.8
2023–24	Princeton	29	29	31.2	.451	.338	.798	5.7	3.7	1.0	.5	17.1
2024–25	Princeton	30	30	32.1	.439	.366	.789	6.1	5.5	1.2	.4	16.9
2025–26	Florida	35	35	27.4	.420	.292	.765	3.7	4.2	1.2	.1	11.6

== Personal life ==
Lee was born in Toronto, Ontario, and holds dual citizenship in the United States and Canada. He is of South Korean descent and was first introduced to basketball at the age of seven. Lee is the son of Eun-Kyung Lee and Daniel Bernstein. He is a Christian.

On June 1, 2025, Lee signed a deal with Serious Player Only for a multi-year brand sponsorship that includes a future signature shoe.
