= LeJuan Watts =

American basketball player (born 2003)

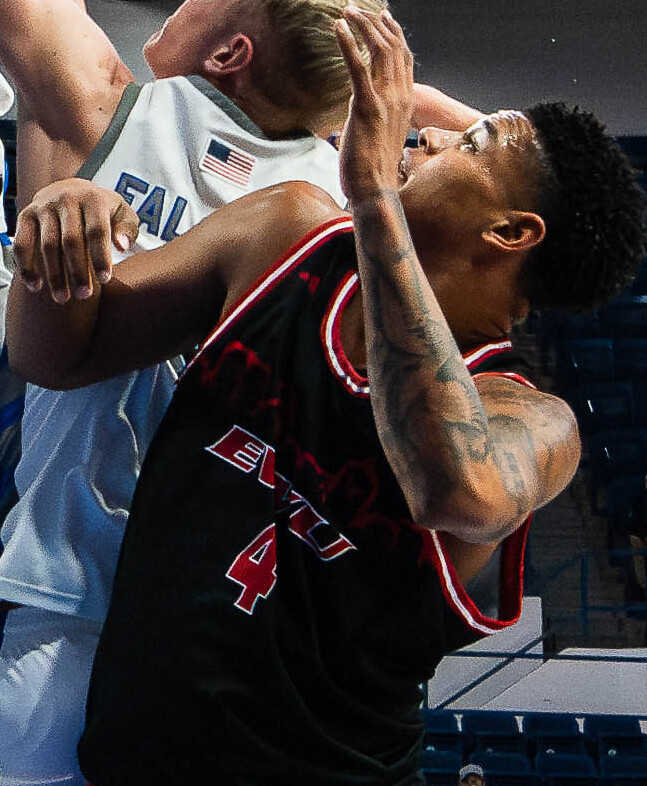
- Watts in 2023

No. 8 – Washington Huskies
- Position: Small forward / shooting guard
- Conference: Big Ten Conference

Personal information
- Born: October 10, 2003 (age 23) Clovis, California, U.S.
- Listed height: 6 ft 5 in (1.96 m)
- Listed weight: 225 lb (102 kg)

Career information
- High school: Bullard (Fresno, California)
- College: Eastern Washington (2023–2024); Washington State (2024–2025); Texas Tech (2025–2026); Washington (2026–present)

Career highlights
- Big Sky Freshman of the Year (2024)

LeJuan Watts (born October 10, 2003) is an American college basketball player for the Washington Huskies of the Big Ten Conference. He previously played for the Eastern Washington Eagles, Washington State Cougars, and Texas Tech Red Raiders.

== Career ==
Watts attended Bullard High School in Fresno, California and committed to play college basketball at Eastern Washington University. After redshirting during the 2022–23 season, he averaged 9.4 points and 4.9 rebounds per game and was named the Big Sky Freshman of the Year. He transferred to Washington State University following the season. Watts made an instant impact for the Cougars, emerging as one of the team's leading scorers and rebounders. He started all 34 games, averaging 13.7 points, 6.7 rebounds, and 4.4 assists. Watts entered the transfer portal for the second time at the conclusion of the season. On April 12, 2025, he announced his decision to transfer to Texas Tech University. Watts averaged 11.8 points and 6 rebounds per game for the Red Raiders. Following the season he transferred to Washington, joining his brother on the football team.

== Career statistics ==
Legend
GP	Games played	GS	Games started	MPG	Minutes per game
FG%	Field goal percentage	3P%	3-point field goal percentage	FT%	Free throw percentage
RPG	Rebounds per game	APG	Assists per game	SPG	Steals per game
BPG	Blocks per game	PPG	Points per game	**Bold**	Career high

=== College ===
Year	Team	GP	GS	MPG	FG%	3P%	FT%	RPG	APG	SPG	BPG	PPG
2023–24	Eastern Washington	32	0	22.6	.612	.405	.719	4.9	1.7	.9	.4	9.4
2024–25	Washington State	34	34	31.6	.549	.422	.734	6.7	4.4	1.1	.5	13.7
2025–26	Texas Tech	33	28	27.3	.433	.321	.769	6.0	2.4	.7	.2	11.8
