= JT Toppin =

American basketball player (born 2005)

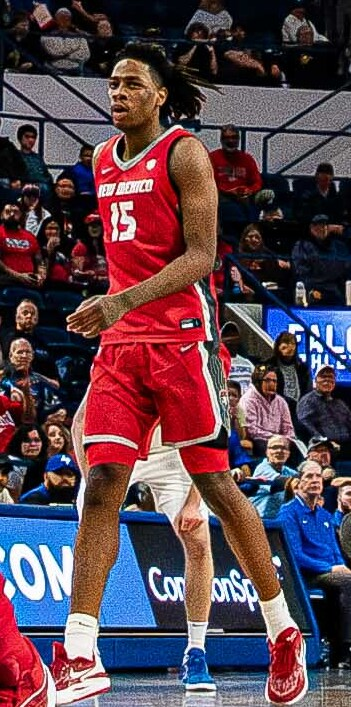

No. 15 – Texas Tech Red Raiders
- Position: Power forward
- Conference: Big 12 Conference

Personal information
- Born: June 14, 2005 (age 21) Lancaster, California, U.S.
- Listed height: 6 ft 9 in (2.06 m)
- Listed weight: 230 lb (104 kg)

Career information
- High school: Faith Family Academy (Oak Cliff, Texas)
- College: New Mexico (2023–2024); Texas Tech (2024–present)

Career highlights
- 2× Consensus second-team All-American (2025, 2026); Big 12 Player of the Year (2025); 2× First-team All-Big 12 (2025, 2026); Big 12 Newcomer of the Year (2025); Big 12 All-Newcomer Team (2025); Second-team All-Mountain West (2024); Mountain West Freshman of the Year (2024)

Jadyn "JT" Toppin (born June 14, 2005) is an American college basketball player for the Texas Tech Red Raiders of the Big 12 Conference. He previously played for the New Mexico Lobos.

== Early life and high school career ==
Toppin was born in Lancaster, California and attended Faith Family Academy of Oak Cliff. In his junior and senior years, he led Faith Family Academy to Texas state championship victories.

=== Recruiting ===
Toppin was a consensus four-star recruit and considered to be top-20 player in Texas, according to major recruiting services. On September 19, 2022, Toppin committed to the New Mexico Lobos over offers from Arizona State and Tulsa.

College recruiting
Name	Hometown	School	Height	Weight	Commit date
Jadyn Toppin; PF	Lancaster, California	Faith Family Academy of Oak Cliff	6 ft 7 in (2.01 m)	205 lb (93 kg)	Sep 19, 2022
Jadyn Toppin; PF	Recruit ratings: 247Sports: On3: ESPN: (81)				
Overall recruit ranking: 247Sports: 133 On3: 133
Note: In many cases, Scout, Rivals, 247Sports, On3, and ESPN may conflict in their listings of height and weight.; In these cases, the average was taken. ESPN grades are on a 100-point scale.; Sources: "2023 Team Ranking". Rivals.

== College career ==
=== New Mexico ===
As a freshman at New Mexico, Toppin averaged 12.4 points, 9.1 rebounds and 1.9 blocks per game, and was named the Mountain West Freshman of the Year. Following his freshman season, he entered the transfer portal and declared for the 2024 NBA draft. Toppin received an invite and participated in the 2024 NBA draft combine. Ultimately, he would withdraw from the draft and announce his decision to transfer to Texas Tech University to play for the Texas Tech Red Raiders.

=== Texas Tech ===
In his Red Raider debut, Toppin scored 19 points and grabbed eight rebounds in a 94–61 victory against the Bethune-Cookman Wildcats. On February 12, Toppin scored a season-high 41 points and grabbed 15 rebounds in a 111–106 double-overtime win against Arizona State.

In his first season with the Red Raiders, Toppin led the Red Raiders with 18.2 points, 9.4 rebounds, 1.5 blocks while snagging 19 double-doubles. Toppin was a consensus second-team All-American and earned the Big 12 Player of the Year, while also winning Big 12 Newcomer of the Year and All-Big 12 First Team honors.

Prior to the start of the 2025–26 season, Toppin was named to the watch list for the Naismith Trophy, an award given to the best men's college basketball player annually.

On February 17, Toppin suffered a season-ending injury after tearing his ACL in his right knee in a game against Arizona State. At the time of his injury, Toppin led his team with 21.8 points, 10.8 rebounds, and 1.7 blocks per game.

== Career statistics ==
Legend
GP	Games played	GS	Games started	MPG	Minutes per game
FG%	Field goal percentage	3P%	3-point field goal percentage	FT%	Free throw percentage
RPG	Rebounds per game	APG	Assists per game	SPG	Steals per game
BPG	Blocks per game	PPG	Points per game	**Bold**	Career high

=== College ===
Year	Team	GP	GS	MPG	FG%	3P%	FT%	RPG	APG	SPG	BPG	PPG
2023–24	New Mexico	**36**	**35**	26.6	**.623**	**.344**	.565	9.1	.6	1.1	**1.9**	12.4
2024–25	Texas Tech	33	33	27.3	.554	.327	**.676**	9.4	1.2	.8	1.5	18.2
2025–26	Texas Tech	25	25	**34.8**	.548	.281	.579	**10.8**	**2.1**	**1.4**	1.7	**21.8**
Career		94	93	29.0	.570	.313	.616	9.6	1.2	1.1	1.7	16.9
