= Richie Saunders (basketball) =

American basketball player (born 2001)

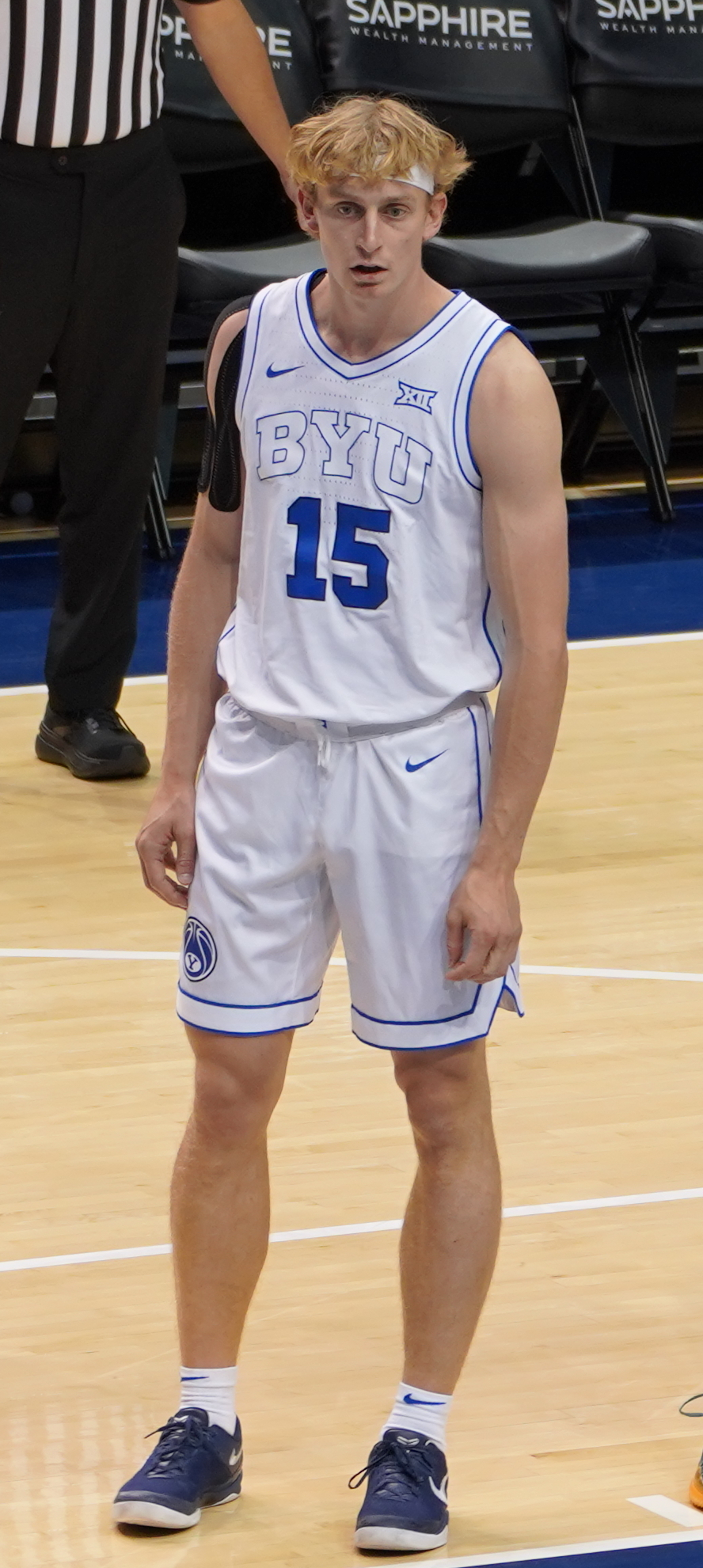
- Saunders with BYU in 2024

No. 5 – Memphis Grizzlies
- Position: Shooting guard
- League: NBA

Personal information
- Born: September 19, 2001 (age 25) Riverton, Utah, U.S.
- Listed height: 6 ft 5 in (1.96 m)
- Listed weight: 200 lb (91 kg)

Career information
- High school: Wasatch Academy (Mount Pleasant, Utah)
- College: BYU (2022–2026)
- NBA draft: 2026: 2nd round, 32nd overall pick
- Drafted by: Memphis Grizzlies
- Playing career: 2026–present

Career history
- 2026–present: Memphis Grizzlies
- 2026–present: →Memphis Hustle

Career highlights
- First-team All-Big 12 (2025); Second-team All-Big 12 (2026); Big 12 Most Improved Player (2025)
- Stats at NBA.com
- Stats at Basketball Reference

Richard Warner Saunders (born September 19, 2001) is an American professional basketball player for the Memphis Grizzlies of the National Basketball Association (NBA), on a two-way contract with the Memphis Hustle of the NBA G League. He played college basketball for the BYU Cougars. Saunders was selected by the Memphis Grizzlies with the 32nd overall pick in the second round of the 2026 NBA draft.

== Early life ==
Richard Warner Saunders was born on September 19, 2001, in Riverton, Utah, to Lisa and Rich Saunders. He has four older sisters and is a great-grandson of F. Nephi Grigg, a founder of Ore-Ida and inventor of the Tater Tot. Saunders attended Wasatch Academy. Coming out of high school, he was rated as a three-star recruit and was the 3rd ranked prospect from Utah in the class of 2020. He committed to play college basketball for the BYU Cougars over offers from Creighton, Utah State, Oregon State, and Utah.

== College career ==
As a freshman in 2022–23, Saunders appeared in 34 games with two starts, averaging 5.5 points and 2.4 rebounds per game. In 2023–24, he appeared in 34 games with one start and averaged 9.6 points, 4.1 rebounds, and 1.1 assists per game. Saunders entered his name into the NCAA transfer portal after the season, but ultimately chose to return to play for BYU. Heading into his junior year, he become a full-time starter for the first time in his career. On December 31, 2024, Saunders posted a career-high 30 points in a victory over Arizona State. On January 11, 2025, he tallied 26 points in a loss to TCU. On February 22, Saunders scored 25 points including the pair of game-winning free throws versus Arizona. For his performance during the 2024–25 season, he was named the Big 12 Most Improved Player while also being named first-team all-Big 12. On February 15, 2026, Saunders suffered a season-ending ACL injury, essentially ending his collegiate career after playing 25 games in the 2025–26 season.

== Professional career ==
On June 24, 2026, Saunders was selected with the 32nd overall pick by the Memphis Grizzlies in the 2026 NBA draft.

== Career statistics ==
Legend
GP	Games played	GS	Games started	MPG	Minutes per game
FG%	Field goal percentage	3P%	3-point field goal percentage	FT%	Free throw percentage
RPG	Rebounds per game	APG	Assists per game	SPG	Steals per game
BPG	Blocks per game	PPG	Points per game	**Bold**	Career high

=== College ===
Year	Team	GP	GS	MPG	FG%	3P%	FT%	RPG	APG	SPG	BPG	PPG
2022–23	BYU	34	2	15.9	.453	.333	.684	2.4	0.8	0.6	0.3	5.5
2023–24	BYU	34	1	20.7	**.523**	.364	.712	4.1	1.1	0.8	0.2	9.6
2024–25	BYU	35	35	29.5	.518	**.432**	**.835**	4.5	1.6	1.2	**0.4**	16.5
2025–26	BYU	25	25	**31.4**	.489	.376	.817	**5.8**	**2.1**	**1.7**	0.3	**18.0**
Career		128	63	23.9	.502	.387	.788	4.1	1.4	1.0	0.3	12.1

== Personal life ==
Saunders is a member of the Church of Jesus Christ of Latter-day Saints. He served a mission for the church in Seattle, Washington; he was originally called to serve in Madagascar, but was reassigned due to the COVID-19 pandemic.

On September 1, 2023, Saunders married former basketball player Sierra Johnson, who also competed for the BYU Cougars.
