= William J. Brennan High School =

Location
- 2400 Cottonwood Way; San Antonio, Bexar County, Texas 78253; United States; 29.458°N 98.725°W

Information
- School type: Public, high school
- Motto: "Brennan Fight Never Dies"
- Founded: 2010
- Locale: Suburb: Large
- School district: Northside ISD
- NCES School ID: 483312012347
- Principal: John Trimble
- Faculty: 174.28 (on an FTE basis)
- Grades: 9–12
- Enrollment: 2,965 (2024–2025)
- Student to teacher ratio: 17.01
- Colors: Black and gold
- Athletics conference: UIL AAAAAA
- Mascot: Bears
- Feeder schools: Dr. Joe J. Bernal MS; Gregory Luna MS; Dolph Briscoe MS
- Sports District: 28-6A
- Website: Official website

William J. Brennan High School is the tenth public high school in the Northside Independent School District of San Antonio, Texas, United States. It is a four-year high school that opened in 2010 and graduated its first senior class in June 2012. During 2024–2025, Brennan High School had an enrollment of 2,965 students and a student to teacher ratio of 17.01. For the 2024–2025 school year, the school was given a "C" by the Texas Education Agency, with a distinction for Academic Achievement in English/Language Arts/Reading.

== Area served ==
Brennan serves all areas west of Loop 1604 from just south of the Alamo Ranch neighborhoods west to the Medina County–Bexar County line near Texas State Highway 211 (Hill Country Parkway), extending south to near Marbach Road and its intersection at Grosenbacher Road. The far west areas of San Antonio, Texas, are experiencing rapid growth and Brennan alleviated overcrowded conditions at neighboring William Howard Taft High School and John Paul Stevens High School.

== Namesake ==
As with all the high schools in the Northside Independent School District, it was named after a United States Supreme Court Justice, William J. Brennan. Brennan was appointed by President Eisenhower in 1956 and retired in 1990. He died in 1997 at the age of 91.

== Athletics ==
The Brennan Bears compete in these sports -

- Baseball
- Basketball
- Cross Country
- Football
- Golf
- Soccer
- Softball
- Swimming and Diving
- Water Polo
- Tennis
- Track and Field
- Volleyball
- Marching Band

=== Football ===
In the 2013–2014 school year, the football team advanced to the Class 4A Division 1 state championship football game and played Denton Guyer High School from Denton, Texas. The game was played in Arlington, Texas, at AT&T Stadium. Brennan fell short 31–14 and received the title of state runner-up with a 15–1 season record.

== Feeder schools ==
Brennan is fed by Luna, Briscoe, and Bernal middle schools, which are fed by elementary schools Behlau, Boldt, Chumbley, Cole, Galm, Gamez, Hoffman, Langley, Lieck, Mireles, Mora, Ott, and Wernli.

== Band ==
The Brennan Bear Band is under the direction of Chad Taylor with assistant director Matthew Narvaez. The Bear Band has consistently received 1's at UIL marching contest since the opening of the school in 2010.

2012-2013 - The band placed first in several competitions and contests with their show, "The Fire Within." Among these were first place in Class 4A Northside ISD Marching Contest and first place in the USBands New Braunfel Showcase. At the Northside ISD Marching Contest, the percussion received the highest score of all the bands for "Percussion Captions." At the USBands New Braunfel Showcase, Brennan received first place for the categories of "Percussion, Visual, and Music".

2013-2014 - The band became the first 4A marching band in the Northside Independent School District to advance to the UIL state competition level. In the State of Texas (4A), the band placed 19th for their show, "Turning Points".

2014-2015 - The band competed in the 6A level with their show, "Mood Rings". The band received a first division in the UIL Region marching competition, advancing them to Area Prelims at Dub Faris Stadium in San Antonio. They performed first in Class 6A of the Area Marching Competition, where they fell short of a spot to Area Finals, placing 13th out of 20 bands competing for one of the ten Finals' spots.

2015-2016 - The band competed in the 6A division with their show, "Intergalactic". They received sweepstakes at the UIL Region Competition.

2016-2017 - The band competed in the 6A division with their show, "Portraits of the Imagination".

== Notable alumni ==
- George King (2013) – NBA player
- Derick Roberson (2014) – NFL player
- Jordan Murphy (2015) – NBA G League player
- Kingston Flemings (2025) - college basketball player
