= 2026–27 Big 12 Conference men's basketball season =

- League: NCAA Division I
- Sport: Basketball
- Teams: 16
- TV partner(s): CBS (CBS, CBS Sports Network), Fox Sports (Fox, FS1, FS2); ESPN (ABC, ESPN, ESPN2, Big 12 Now, ESPNU); TNT Sports (TNT,TBS, TruTV, HBO Max); NBC Sports (Peacock)

2027 NBA draft

Regular season

Big 12 tournament
- Venue: T-Mobile Center, Kansas City, Missouri

Big 12 men's basketball seasons
- ← 2025–26 2027–28 →

2026–27 Big 12 men's basketball standings
	Conf.				Overall
Team	W		L	PCT	W		L	PCT
No. 8 Houston	0	–	0	–	6	–	0	1.000
Arizona State	0	–	0	–	5	–	0	1.000
No. 21 BYU	0	–	0	–	5	–	0	1.000
No. 9 Texas Tech	0	–	0	–	5	–	0	1.000
No. 11 Kansas	0	–	0	–	5	–	1	.833
No. 12 Arizona	0	–	0	–	4	–	1	.800
Baylor	0	–	0	–	4	–	1	.800
Cincinnati	0	–	0	–	4	–	1	.800
TCU	0	–	0	–	4	–	1	.800
Iowa State	0	–	0	–	3	–	1	.750
West Virginia	0	–	0	–	4	–	2	.667
UCF	0	–	0	–	4	–	2	.667
Kansas State	0	–	0	–	3	–	2	.600
Oklahoma State	0	–	0	–	3	–	2	.600
Utah	0	–	0	–	3	–	2	.600
Colorado	0	–	0	–	2	–	3	.400
† 2027 Big 12 tournament winner As of November 21, 2026; Rankings from AP poll

The 2026–27 Big 12 men's basketball season will began with the start of the 2026–27 NCAA Division I men's basketball season on November 2, 2026. Regular season conference play will start in January, 2027 and concluded on March 4, 2027. The 2027 Big 12 men's basketball tournament will be held on March 9−13, 2027, at the T-Mobile Center in Kansas City, Missouri.

== Previous season ==
Big 12 regular season and tournament champion Arizona received the conference's automatic bid to the 2026 NCAA tournament. They would ultimately lose to Michigan in the Final Four semifinal.

Eight out of the sixteen members were granted bids to the NCAA tournament. Those eight teams were Arizona, BYU, Houston, Iowa State, Kansas, TCU, Texas Tech and UCF.

== Offseason ==
=== Recruiting classes ===
Rankings
Team	ESPN	247 Sports	On3	Signees
Arizona	13	29	4	3
Arizona State	–	88	57	3
Baylor	18	70	25	1
BYU	10	16	32	5
Cincinnati	–	–	–	0
Colorado	–	81	98	4
Houston	22	30	9	2
Iowa State	–	20	37	4
Kansas	3	4	12	4
Kansas State	–	54	109	2
Oklahoma State	9	15	18	3
TCU	–	99	156	2
Texas Tech	–	69	31	1
UCF	–	47	41	2
Utah	–	113	84	3
West Virginia	14	23	28	3

== Coaches ==
=== Coaching changes ===
Coach	School	Reason	Replacement
Bobby Hurley	Arizona State	Not renewed	Randy Bennett
Wes Miller	Cincinnati	Fired	Jerrod Calhoun
Jerome Tang	Kansas State	Fired	Casey Alexander

=== Head coaches ===
Note: Stats are through the beginning of the season. All stats and records are from time at current school only.

Team	Head coach	Previous job	Seasons at school as HC	Overall record at School	Big 12 record	NCAA tournaments	NCAA Final Fours	NCAA championships
Arizona	Tommy Lloyd	Gonzaga (asst.)	6th	148–36 (.804)	30–8 (.789)	5	1	0
Arizona State	Randy Bennett	Saint Mary's	1st	0–0 (–)	0–0 (–)	0	0	0
Baylor	Scott Drew	Valparaiso	24th	483–276 (.636)	203–196 (.509)	13	1	1
BYU	Kevin Young	Phoenix Suns (asst.)	3rd	49–22 (.690)	23–15 (.605)	2	0	0
Cincinnati	Jerrod Calhoun	Utah State	1st	0–0 (–)	0–0 (–)	0	0	0
Colorado	Tad Boyle	Northern Colorado	17th	329–220 (.599)	18–36 (.333)	6	0	0
Houston	Kelvin Sampson	Houston Rockets (asst.)	13th	329–91 (.783)	48–8 (.857)	8	2	0
Iowa State	T. J. Otzelberger	UNLV	6th	124–52 (.705)	54–38 (.587)	5	0	0
Kansas	Bill Self	Illinois	24th	633–159 (.799)	295–89 (.768)	21†	3†	2
Kansas State	Casey Alexander	Belmont	1st	0–0 (–)	0–0 (–)	0	0	0
Oklahoma State	Steve Lutz	Western Kentucky	3rd	37–33 (.529)	13–25 (.342)	0	0	0
TCU	Jamie Dixon	Pittsburgh	11th	199–138 (.591)	80–100 (.444)	4	0	0
Texas Tech	Grant McCasland	North Texas	4th	74–31 (.705)	38–18 (.679)	3	0	0
UCF	Johnny Dawkins	Stanford	11th	186–131 (.587)	23–33 (.411)	2	0	0
Utah	Alex Jensen	Dallas Mavericks (assistant)	2nd	10–22 (.313)	2–16 (.111)	0	0	0
West Virginia	Ross Hodge	North Texas	2nd	21–14 (.600)	9–9 (.500)	0	0	0

† All of the Jayhawks' postseason victories and 7 of their regular-season wins were vacated from the 2017–18 season. Officially, their record for the season 16–8 overall and 3–5 in conference play. The Jayhawks' regular-season Big 12 championship and their Big 12 tournament championship were vacated. The Jayhawks' entire NCAA tournament appearance from the season was vacated including their Final Four appearance.

== Preseason ==
=== Big 12 media day ===
Big 12 Men's Basketball Media day will be held on October 20–21, 2026 at T-Mobile Center in Kansas City, Missouri, with coverage on ESPNU and ESPN+. Starting in 2026 the Big 12 will have both the Men's and Women's programs participate on the same days. Eight schools will be featured on each day.

Teams and representatives attending was as follows:

Team	Coach	Player
Arizona	Tommy Lloyd	Caleb Holt, Ivan Kharchenkov, Motiejus Krivas
Arizona State	Randy Bennett	Emmanuel Innocenti, Paulius Murauskas, Dillan Shaw
Baylor	Scott Drew	Kayden Mingo, Isaac Williams IV
BYU	Kevin Young	Bruce Branch III, Collin Chandler, Robert Wright III
Cincinnati	Jerrod Calhoun	Myles Colvin, Jayden Hastings, Tylen Riley
Colorado	Tad Boyle	Barrington Hargress, Josiah Sanders
Houston	Kelvin Sampson	Chase McCarty, Mercy Miller, Joseph Tugler
Iowa State	T. J. Otzelberger	Jamarion Batemon, Blake Buchanan, Killyan Toure
Kansas	Bill Self	Keanu Dawes, Tyran Stokes, Kohl Rosario
Kansas State	Casey Alexander	Isaiah Abraham, Brandon Rechsteiner
Oklahoma State	Steve Lutz	Jordan Burks, Kanye Clary, Parsa Fallah
TCU	Jamie Dixon	Xavier Edmonds, Brock Harding, Micah Robinson
Texas Tech	Grant McCasland	Donovan Atwell, JT Toppin, Darrion Williams
UCF	Johnny Dawkins	John Bol, Dior Johnson, Cayden Vasko
Utah	Alex Jensen	Alec Anigbata, Jackson Holcombe
West Virginia	Ross Hodge	Finley Bizjack, Miles Sadler, Martin Somerville

==== Big 12 preseason polls ====
The Big 12 preseason coaches was released on October 15, 2026 & media poll will be released at a later date. All awards were voted on by the league's 16 head coaches, who can not vote for their own team or players.

Big 12 Preseason Coaches Poll

	Big 12 Coaches	Points
1.	Arizona	220 (12)
2.	Houston	214 (4)
3.	Kansas	186
4.	Iowa State	181
5.	Texas Tech	180
6.	BYU	148
7.	TCU	137
T8.	Cincinnati	116
T8.	West Virginia	116
10.	Baylor	102
11.	Oklahoma State	98
12.	Arizona State	75
13.	UCF	55
T14.	Colorado	34
T14.	Kansas State	34
16.	Utah	24
Reference: (#) first-place votes

Big 12 Preseason Media Poll

	Big 12 Coaches
1.	Arizona
2.	Houston
3.	Kansas
4.	Texas Tech
5.	Iowa State
6.	BYU
7.	Baylor
8.	TCU
9.	Cincinnati
10.	West Virginia
11.	Oklahoma State
12.	Arizona State
13.	UCF
14.	Kansas State
15.	Colorado
16.	Utah

=== Big 12 preseason all-conference ===
Player	School	Pos.	Yr.	Ht., Wt.	Hometown (Last School)
Ivan Kharchenkov	Arizona	F	So.	6'7", 230	Munich, Germany (Bayern Munich)
Motiejus Krivas	Arizona	C	Jr.	7'2", 260	Siauliai, Lithuania (BC Žalgiris)
Paulius Murauskas	Arizona State	F	Sr.	6'8", 235	Kaunas, Lithuania (St. Mary's)
Robert Wright III†	BYU	G	Jr.	6'1", 183	Wilmington, DE (Baylor)
Dedan Thomas Jr.	Houston	G	Sr.	6'1", 180	Las Vegas, NV (LSU)
Joseph Tugler	Houston	F	Sr.	6'8", 230	Houston, TX (Cypress Falls HS)
Tamin Lipsey	Iowa State	G	GS	6'1", 200	Ames, IA (Ames HS)
Tyran Stokes	Kansas	G	Fr.	6'7", 230	Louisville, KY (Rainer Beach HS)
Xavier Edmonds	TCU	F	Sr.	6'8", 252	Long Beach, CA (Salt Lake CC)
JT Toppin†	Texas Tech	F	Sr.	6'9", 230	Dallas, TX (New Mexico)
† denotes unanimous selection Reference:

- Player of the Year: Motiejus Krivas, Arizona
- Co-Newcomer of the Year: Paulius Murauskas, Arizona State
- Freshman of the Year: Tyran Stokes, Kansas

=== Preseason watchlists ===
Below is a table of notable preseason watch lists.

Player	School	Wooden	Naismith	Cousy	West	Erving	Malone	Abdul-Jabbar
Caleb Holt	Arizona	✓	✓		✓			
Ivan Kharchenkov	Arizona	✓	✓			✓		
Motiejus Krivas	Arizona	✓	✓					✓
Paulius Murauskas	Arizona State	✓	✓				✓	
Bruce Branch III	BYU					✓		
Collin Chandler	BYU				✓			
Jaxon Kohler	BYU						✓	
Robert Wright III	BYU	✓	✓	✓				
Joseph Tugler	Houston	✓	✓				✓	
Dedan Thomas Jr.	Houston	✓		✓				
Tamin Lipsey	Iowa State		✓					
Killyan Toure	Iowa State				✓			
Keanu Dawes	Kansas						✓	
Trey Kaufman-Renn	Kansas		✓					
Tyran Stokes	Kansas	✓	✓			✓		
Xavier Edmonds	TCU						✓	
JT Toppin	Texas Tech	✓	✓				✓	
Finley Bizjack	West Virginia				✓			

=== Preseason All-American teams ===
Player	School	AP	ESPN	CBS	Sports Illustrated	Blue Ribbon
Motiejus Krivas	Arizona	1st Team		2nd Team	2nd Team	2nd Team
Robert Wright III	BYU		2nd Team	3rd Team		1st Team
Joseph Tugler	Houston					4th Team
Tyran Stokes	Kansas		1st Team	1st Team	1st Team	
JT Toppin	Texas Tech		2nd Team	2nd Team	3rd Team	

=== Preseason national polls/ratings ===
	AP	Blue Ribbon; Yearbook	CBS Sports	Coaches	ESPN	FOX Sports	Lindy's; Sports	Kenpom	NCAA Sports	Sports; Illustrated
Arizona	No. 5	No. 5	No. 4	No. 4	No. 6	No. 5	No. 10	No. 5	No. 6	No. 8
Arizona State	–	–	No. 55	–	–	–	–	No. 71	–	–
Baylor	–	–	No. 21	–	–	–	No. 9	No. 35	No. 40	–
BYU	No. 25	–	No. 30	No. 25	No. 19	No. 23	–	No. 33	No. 21	–
Cincinnati	–	–	No. 43	–	–	–	–	No. 31	No. 41	–
Colorado	–	–	No. 83	–	–	–	–	No. 86	–	–
Houston	No. 10	No. 8	No. 7	No. 8	No. 17	No. 9	No. 4	No. 3	No. 11	No. 9
Iowa State	No. 18	No. 17	No. 20	No. 14т	No. 27	No. 14	No. 6	No. 6	No. 23	No. 21
Kansas	No. 17	No. 16	No. 8	No. 18т	No. 25	No. 19	–	No. 8	No. 15	No. 19
Kansas State	–	–	–	–	–	–	–	No. 96	–	–
Oklahoma State	–	–	No. 53	–	–	–	–	No. 45	–	–
TCU	RV	–	No. 56	–	–	–	–	No. 49	–	–
Texas Tech	No. 19	–	No. 18	–	No. 9	No. 24	–	No. 12	No. 31	–
UCF	–	–	No. 75	–	–	–	–	No. 57	–	–
Utah	–	–	–	–	–	–	–	No. 84	–	–
West Virginia	–	–	No. 40	–	–	–	–	No. 41	No. 32	–

== Regular season ==
The Conference match ups for each school have yet to be announced.

Key
Schedule	Home & Away Conference Schedule
	Home (H) & Away (A)
	Home Only (H)
	Away Only (A)

	Arizona	Arizona State	Baylor	BYU	Cincinnati	Colorado	Houston	Iowa State	Kansas	Kansas State	Oklahoma State	TCU	Texas Tech	UCF	Utah	West Virginia
vs. Arizona	—	H & A	A	H & A	H	A	H & A	H	A	H	H	A	H	A	A	H
vs. Arizona State	H & A	—	A	A	H	H	A	A	H	H & A	H	H & A	H	A	A	H
vs. Baylor	H	H	—	H	A	H & A	A	A	H & A	A	A	H	H	H & A	H	A
vs. BYU	H & A	H	A	—	A	H	H	H	A	A	A	H & A	H	H	H & A	A
vs. Cincinnati	A	A	H	H	—	H	A	H	A	H & A	H	A	H & A	A	H	H & A
vs. Colorado	H	A	H & A	A	A	—	H & A	A	H	H	H	H	A	H	H & A	A
vs. Houston	H & A	H	H	A	H	H & A	—	A	A	H	A	A	H & A	H	A	H
vs. Iowa State	A	H	H	A	A	H	H	—	H & A	A	H & A	A	H	H	A	H & A
vs. Kansas	H	A	H & A	H	H	A	H	H & A	—	H & A	A	H	A	A	H	A
vs. Kansas State	A	H & A	H	H	H & A	A	A	H	H & A	—	A	A	A	H	H	H
vs. Oklahoma State	A	A	H	H	A	A	H	H & A	H	H	—	H & A	A	A	H & A	H
vs. TCU	H	H & A	A	H & A	H	A	H	H	A	H	H & A	—	A	A	A	H
vs. Texas Tech	A	A	A	A	H & A	H	H & A	A	H	H	H	H	—	H & A	H	A
vs. UCF	H	H	H & A	A	H	A	A	A	H	A	H	H	H & A	—	A	H & A
vs. Utah	H	H	A	H & A	A	H & A	H	H	A	A	H & A	H	A	H	—	A
vs. West Virginia	A	A	H	H	H & A	H	A	H & A	H	A	A	A	H	H & A	H	—

=== Conference matrix ===
	Arizona	Arizona State	Baylor	BYU	Cincinnati	Colorado	Houston	Iowa State	Kansas	Kansas State	Oklahoma State	TCU	Texas Tech	UCF	Utah	West Virginia
vs. Arizona	—	0–0	0–0	0–0	0–0	0–0	0–0	0–0	0–0	0–0	0–0	0–0	0–0	0–0	0–0	0–0
vs. Arizona State	0–0	—	0–0	0–0	0–0	0–0	0–0	0–0	0–0	0–0	0–0	0–0	0–0	0–0	0–0	0–0
vs. Baylor	0–0	0–0	—	0–0	0–0	0–0	0–0	0–0	0–0	0–0	0–0	0–0	0–0	0–0	0–0	0–0
vs. BYU	0–0	0–0	0–0	—	0–0	0–0	0–0	0–0	0–0	0–0	0–0	0–0	0–0	0–0	0–0	0–0
vs. Cincinnati	0–0	0–0	0–0	0–0	—	0–0	0–0	0–0	0–0	0–0	0–0	0–0	0–0	0–0	0–0	0–0
vs. Colorado	0–0	0–0	0–0	0–0	0–0	—	0–0	0–0	0–0	0–0	0–0	0–0	0–0	0–0	0–0	0–0
vs. Houston	0–0	0–0	0–0	0–0	0–0	0–0	—	0–0	0–0	0–0	0–0	0–0	0–0	0–0	0–0	0–0
vs. Iowa State	0–0	0–0	0–0	0–0	0–0	0–0	0–0	—	0–0	0–0	0–0	0–0	0–0	0–0	0–0	0–0
vs. Kansas	0–0	0–0	0–0	0–0	0–0	0–0	0–0	0–0	—	0–0	0–0	0–0	0–0	0–0	0–0	0–0
vs. Kansas State	0–0	0–0	0–0	0–0	0–0	0–0	0–0	0–0	0–0	—	0–0	0–0	0–0	0–0	0–0	0–0
vs. Oklahoma State	0–0	0–0	0–0	0–0	0–0	0–0	0–0	0–0	0–0	0–0	—	0–0	0–0	0–0	0–0	0–0
vs. TCU	0–0	0–0	0–0	0–0	0–0	0–0	0–0	0–0	0–0	0–0	0–0	—	0–0	0–0	0–0	0–0
vs. Texas Tech	0–0	0–0	0–0	0–0	0–0	0–0	0–0	0–0	0–0	0–0	0–0	0–0	—	0–0	0–0	0–0
vs. UCF	0–0	0–0	0–0	0–0	0–0	0–0	0–0	0–0	0–0	0–0	0–0	0–0	0–0	—	0–0	0–0
vs. Utah	0–0	0–0	0–0	0–0	0–0	0–0	0–0	0–0	0–0	0–0	0–0	0–0	0–0	0–0	—	0–0
vs. West Virginia	0–0	0–0	0–0	0–0	0–0	0–0	0–0	0–0	0–0	0–0	0–0	0–0	0–0	0–0	0–0	—
Total	0–0	0–0	0–0	0–0	0–0	0–0	0–0	0–0	0–0	0–0	0–0	0–0	0–0	0–0	0–0	0–0

=== Big Monday Games ===
Rankings from the AP Poll at time of the game:

Date	Visitor	Home	Site	Significance	Score
Feb. 1	Kansas	Houston	Fertitta Center ● Houston, TX	Big Monday	–
Feb. 8	TCU	Arizona	McKale Center ● Tucson, AZ	Big Monday	–
Feb. 15	Houston	Texas Tech	United Supermarkets Arena ● Lubbock, TX	Big Monday	–
Feb. 22	Arizona	BYU	Marriott Center ● Provo, UT	Big Monday	–
Mar. 1	Iowa State	Kansas	Allen Fieldhouse ● Lawrence, KS	Big Monday	–

=== Points scored ===
Team	For	Against	Difference
Arizona	434	375	59
Arizona State	410	318	92
Baylor	462	309	153
BYU	484	357	127
Cincinnati	407	306	101
Colorado	370	355	15
Houston	443	318	125
Iowa State	309	229	80
Kansas	461	338	123
Kansas State	336	273	63
Oklahoma State	377	282	95
TCU	380	269	111
Texas Tech	410	256	154
UCF	426	395	31
Utah	285	255	30
West Virginia	415	316	99

=== Multi-Team Events ===
Team	Tournament	Finish
Arizona	Maui Invitational	−
Arizona State	Acrisure Series	−
Baylor	Players Era 16 – Bracket 2	−
BYU	Maui Invitational	−
Cincinnati	−	−
Colorado	Acrisure Series	−
Houston	Players Era 8	1st
Iowa State	Players Era 16 – Bracket 1	−
Kansas	Players Era 8	2nd
Kansas State	Players Era 16 – Bracket 2	−
Oklahoma State	−	−
TCU	Players Era 16 – Bracket 2	−
Texas Tech	Players Era 16 – Bracket 1	−
UCF	−	−
Utah	−	−
West Virginia	Players Era 8	4th

=== Regular season honors ===
==== Big 12 Players of the Week ====
Week	Player of the week	Team	Newcomer of the week	Team
November 9, 2026	Robert Wright III	BYU	Miles Sadler	West Virginia
November 16, 2026	Tre White	Kansas	Tyran Stokes	Kansas

===== Team Total =====
Team	Total
Kansas	2
BYU	1
West Virginia	1
Arizona	0
Arizona State	0
Baylor	0
Cincinnati	0
Colorado	0
Houston	0
Iowa State	0
Kansas State	0
Oklahoma State	0
TCU	0
Texas Tech	0
UCF	0
Utah	0

==== Big 12 Starting Five ====
The following players were named to the Big 12 Conference Starting Five, which highlights other strong performances from across the Conference. Honorees were determined by a panel of media who cover Big 12 basketball.

Week	Big 12 Starting Five	Team
November 9, 2026	Ivan Kharchenkov; Paulius Murauskas; Robert Wright III; Dior Johnson; Miles Sadler	Arizona; Arizona State; BYU; UCF; West Virginia
November 16, 2026	Caleb Holt; Paulius Murauskas (2); Tyran Stokes; Tre White; Cruz Davis	Arizona; Arizona State; Kansas; Kansas; Texas Tech

Week	Big 12 Starting Five	Team

Week	Big 12 Starting Five	Team

== Rankings ==
Legend
	Increase in ranking
	Decrease in ranking
	Not ranked previous week
т	Tied with another team in rankings

		Pre	Wk 1	Wk 2	Wk 3	Wk 4	Wk 5	Wk 6	Wk 7	Wk 8	Wk 9	Wk 10	Wk 11	Wk 12	Wk 13	Wk 14	Wk 15	Wk 16	Wk 17	Wk 18	Wk 19	Final
Arizona	AP	5	12	12																		
Arizona	C	4	11	12																		
Arizona State	AP																					
Arizona State	C																					
Baylor	AP		RV	RV																		
Baylor	C		RV	RV																		
BYU	AP	25	23	21																		
BYU	C	25	25	24																		
Cincinnati	AP																					
Cincinnati	C	RV																				
Colorado	AP																					
Colorado	C																					
Houston	AP	10	8	8																		
Houston	C	8	8	7																		
Iowa State	AP	18	RV	RV																		
Iowa State	C	14	23	RV																		
Kansas	AP	17	15	11																		
Kansas	C	18	14	9																		
Kansas State	AP																					
Kansas State	C																					
Oklahoma State	AP																					
Oklahoma State	C																					
TCU	AP	RV	RV	RV																		
TCU	C																					
Texas Tech	AP	19	16	9																		
Texas Tech	C	15	17	11																		
UCF	AP																					
UCF	C																					
Utah	AP																					
Utah	C																					
West Virginia	AP																					
West Virginia	C	RV	RV	RV																		

== Big 12 records vs other conferences ==
The Big 12 finished with a record of 62–15 in non-conference play during the regular season. The Big 12 has a record of 0–0 during NCAA tournament play.

Regular season

Power 4 Conferences
Conference	Record
ACC	1–0
Big East	2–1
Big Ten	3–3
SEC	4–5
Combined	10–9

Other conferences
Conference	Record
American	0–1
America East	0–0
ASUN	4–0
Atlantic 10	3–1
Big Sky	6–1
Big South	0–0
Big West	3–0
CAA	2–0
CUSA	2–0
Horizon	4–0
Independents/Non-division I	0–0
Ivy League	2–0
Metro Atlantic	2–0
Mid-American	0–0
Mid-Eastern Athletic	0–0
Missouri Valley	0–0
Mountain West	1–0
NEC	1–0
Ohio Valley	1–0
Pac-12	0–1
Patriot League	1–0
Southern	2–0
Southland	3–0
Southwestern Athletic	6–0
Summit	1–1
Sun Belt	5–0
West Coast	1–1
UAC	2–0
Combined	52–7

Postseason

Power 4 Conferences
Conference	Record
ACC	0–0
Big East	0–0
Big Ten	0–0
SEC	0–0
Combined	0–0

Other conferences
Conference	Record
American	0–0
America East	0–0
ASUN	0–0
Atlantic 10	0–0
Big Sky	0–0
Big South	0–0
Big West	0–0
CAA	0–0
CUSA	0–0
Horizon	0–0
Independents/Non-division I	0–0
Ivy League	0–0
Metro Atlantic	0–0
Mid-American	0–0
Mid-Eastern Athletic	0–0
Missouri Valley	0–0
Mountain West	0–0
NEC	0–0
Ohio Valley	0–0
Pac-12	0–0
Patriot League	0–0
Southern	0–0
Southland	0–0
Southwestern Athletic	0–0
Summit	0–0
Sun Belt	0–0
West Coast	0–0
UAC	0–0
Combined	0–0

=== Record against ranked non-conference opponents ===
This is a list of games against ranked opponents only (rankings from the AP Poll at time of the game):

Date	Visitor	Home	Site	Significance	Score	Conference record
Nov. 2	No. 22 UCLA	No. 5 Arizona†	T-Mobile Arena ● Las Vegas, NV	Rivalry / Hall of Fame Series	UCLA 84−75	0−1
Nov. 9	No. 3 Illinois	No. 16 Texas Tech	United Supermarkets Arena ● Lubbock, TX	–	Texas Tech 84−78	1−1
Nov. 9	No. 24 Kentucky	No. 15 Kansas†	United Center ● Chicago, IL	State Farm Champions Classic	Kansas 89−69	2−1
Nov. 15	No. 7 Texas	Baylor†	Frost Bank Center ● San Antonio, TX	–	Texas 75−72	2−2
Nov. 18	No. 1 Florida	No. 8 Houston	Michelob Ultra Arena ● Las Vegas, NV	Players Era 8	Houston 86−76	3−2
Nov. 18	No. 3 UConn	No. 12 Arizona	McKale Center ● Tucson, AZ	–	Arizona 85−79	4−2
Nov. 19	No. 1 Florida	West Virginia	Michelob Ultra Arena ● Las Vegas, NV	Players Era 8	Florida 85−72	4−3
Nov. 20	UCF	No. 15 Vanderbilt	Memorial Gymnasium ● Nashville, TN	–	Vanderbilt 82−74	4−4

† denotes neutral site game

== Postseason ==
=== Big 12 tournament ===
- The 2027 Big 12 Men's Basketball tournamentwas played on March 9−13, 2027, at T-Mobile Center, Kansas City, MO

2027 Big 12 men's basketball tournament seeds and results
Seed	School	Conf.	Over.	Tiebreak 1	Tiebreak 2	First round March 9	Second round March 10	Quarterfinals March 11	Semifinals March 12	Championship March 13
1.	#‡	–	–			Bye		vs. TBD	vs. TBD	vs. TBD
2.	‡	–	–			Bye		vs. TBD	vs. TBD	vs. TBD
3.	‡	–	–			Bye		vs. TBD	vs. TBD	vs. TBD
4.	‡	–	–			Bye		vs. TBD	vs. TBD	vs. TBD
5.	†	–	–			Bye	vs. TBD	vs. TBD	vs. TBD	vs. TBD
6.	†	–	–			Bye	vs. TBD	vs. TBD	vs. TBD	vs. TBD
7.	†	–	–			Bye	vs. TBD	vs. TBD	vs. TBD	vs. TBD
8.	†	–	–			Bye	vs. TBD	vs. TBD	vs. TBD	vs. TBD
9.		–	–			vs. TBD	vs. TBD	vs. TBD	vs. TBD	vs. TBD
10.		–	–			vs. TBD	vs. TBD	vs. TBD	vs. TBD	vs. TBD
11.		–	–			vs. TBD	vs. TBD	vs. TBD	vs. TBD	vs. TBD
12.		–	–			vs. TBD	vs. TBD	vs. TBD	vs. TBD	vs. TBD
13.		–	–			vs. TBD	vs. TBD	vs. TBD	vs. TBD	vs. TBD
14.		–	–			vs. TBD	vs. TBD	vs. TBD	vs. TBD	vs. TBD
15.		–	–			vs. TBD	vs. TBD	vs. TBD	vs. TBD	vs. TBD
16.		–	–			vs. TBD	vs. TBD	vs. TBD	vs. TBD	vs. TBD
# – Big 12 regular season champions, and tournament No. 1 seed ‡ – Received a double-bye into the conference tournament quarterfinal round † – Received a single-bye into the conference tournament second round Overall records include all games played in the Big 12 tournament.

==== Bracket ====
First round Tuesday, March 10
9
16
12
13
10
15
11
14

Second round Wednesday, March 11
8
5
7
6

Quarterfinals; Thursday, March 12
1
4
2
3

Semifinals; Friday, March 13

Championship; Saturday, March 14

Game times are Central Time.

=== NCAA Tournament ===
Seed	Region	School	First round	Second round	Sweet 16	Elite Eight	Final Four	Championship
			vs. TBD	vs. TBD	vs. TBD	vs. TBD	vs. TBD	vs. TBD
	Bids	W–L (%):	0–0 (–)	0–0 (–)	0–0 (–)	0–0 (–)	0–0 (–)	0–0 (–)
Total: 0–0 (–)

=== NIT ===
Seed	School	First round	Second round	Quarterfinals	Semifinals	Final
		vs. TBD	vs. TBD	vs. TBD	vs. TBD	vs. TBD
	W−L (%):	0–0 (–)	0–0 (–)	0–0 (–)	0–0 (–)	TOTAL: 0–0 (–)

=== CBC ===
Seed	School	Quarterfinals	Semifinals	Final
		vs. TBD	vs. TBD	vs. TBD
	W-L (%):	0–0 (1.000)	0–0 (–)	TOTAL: 0–0 (–)

== Postseason honors and awards ==
=== All-Big 12 awards and teams ===
2027 Big 12 Men's Basketball Individual Awards
Award	Recipient(s)
Player of the Year	
Coach of the Year	
Defensive Player of the Year	
Sixth Man Award	
Newcomer of the Year	
Freshman of the Year	
Most Improved Player	

2027 Big 12 Men's Basketball All-Conference Teams
First Team	Second Team	Third Team	Defensive Team	Newcomer Team	Freshman Team
† - denotes unanimous selection

Honorable Mention:

==== Big 12 All-Tournament Team ====
Name	Pos.	Height	Weight	Year	Team

=== Most Outstanding Player ===
Name	Pos.	Height	Weight	Year	Team

==== All-Americans ====
To earn "consensus" status, a player must win honors based on a point system computed from the four different all-America teams. The point system consists of three points for first team, two points for second team and one point for third team. No honorable mention or fourth team or lower are used in the computation. The top five totals plus ties are first team and the next five plus ties are second team.

Player	School	Position	Selector	Consensus
First Team All-Americans
Second Team All-Americans
Third Team All-Americans

==== National Awards ====
The following coaches and players won a national award given out by one of the major college basketball publications.

Coach	School	Award

== TV networks ==
Team	ESPN	ESPN2	ESPNU	ABC	FOX	FS1	CBS	CBSSN	TBS	TNT	TruTV	USA	ACCN	SECN	The CW	Streaming (ESPN+/Peacock/Prime Video/Big12 Now/FloSports)
Arizona	7	3	0	0	3	3	2	2	0	1	2	0	0	0	0	4
Arizona State	0	2	1	0	1	4	0	6	0	1	0	0	0	0	0	14
Baylor	4	1	0	0	0	2	2	1	0	3	1	0	0	0	0	11
BYU	3	5	0	0	1	6	0	1	0	1	0	0	0	0	0	2
Cincinnati	1	1	1	0	1	5	0	1	0	1	0	0	1	0	0	18
Colorado	1	0	0	0	0	2	0	2	0	2	0	1	0	0	0	18
Houston	8	2	0	0	0	2	1	2	0	0	0	0	0	0	1	7
Iowa State	3	1	0	0	3	5	1	2	0	1	0	0	0	0	0	7
Kansas	8	5	1	1	2	1	3	0	0	0	0	0	0	0	0	5
Kansas State	1	0	0	0	2	4	1	5	0	1	1	0	0	0	0	12
Oklahoma State	1	2	0	0	2	2	0	5	0	2	0	0	0	1	0	12
TCU	0	5	3	0	1	0	0	5	0	3	0	0	0	0	0	11
Texas Tech	3	2	0	1	2	2	0	1	0	1	0	0	0	0	0	10
UCF	2	1	2	0	0	2	0	1	0	2	0	0	0	0	0	18
Utah	0	6	0	0	0	1	0	0	0	3	0	0	0	0	0	20
West Virginia	3	5	1	0	1	3	3	2	0	1	0	0	0	0	0	10
Total	45	41	9	2	19	44	13	36	0	23	4	1	1	1	1	179

== Home game attendance ==
Team	Stadium	Capacity	Game 1	Game 2	Game 3	Game 4	Game 5	Game 6	Game 7	Game 8	Game 9	Game 10	Game 11	Game 12	Game 13	Game 14	Game 15	Game 16	Game 17	Game 18	Game 19	Game 20	Game 21	Total	Average	% of Capacity
Arizona	McKale Center	14,688	13,989	14,041	**14,688**†																			42,718	14,239	96.9%
Arizona State	Desert Financial Arena	14,198	5,353†	5,295	5,048	5,351	4,942																	25,989	5,198	36.6%
Baylor	Foster Pavilion	7,500	5,022	5,491†	5,334	4,487																		20,334	5,084	67.7%
BYU	Marriott Center	17,978	16,190	16,963	17,561†	17,245																		67,959	16,990	94.5%
Cincinnati	Fifth Third Arena	12,012	9,420†	9,003	10,419†	9,009																		37,851	9,463	78.7%
Colorado	CU Events Center	11,064	4,420†	4,324	4,382																			13,126	4,375	39.5%
Houston	Fertitta Center	7,100	7,035†	7,035†																				14,070	7,035	99.0%
Iowa State	Hilton Coliseum	14,267	13,930†	13,503	13,787																			41,220	13,740	96.3%
Kansas	Allen Fieldhouse	15,300	**15,300**†	**15,300**†																				30,600	15,300	100.0%
Kansas State	Bramlage Coliseum	11,000	7,047†	7,012	6,820	6,046	6,590																	35,515	6,703	60.9%
Oklahoma State	Gallagher-Iba Arena	13,611	4,576	5,257†	4,323																			14,156	4,719	34.6%
TCU	Schollmaier Arena	6,700	4,647	4,633	4,521	4,765	**7,066**†																	25,632	5,126	76.5%
Texas Tech	United Supermarkets Arena	15,300	13,087	12,548	15,098†	11,869	11,791																	64,393	12,879	84.1%
UCF	Addition Financial Arena	9,432	5,054	5,563†	5,108	5,532	5,504																	26,761	5,352	56.7%
Utah	Jon M. Huntsman Center	15,000	6,312	6,516†	5,742	5,273																		23,843	5,961	39.7%
West Virginia	WVU Coliseum	14,000	9,024	9,081†	8,680																			26,785	8,928	63.7%
Total		12,447																						508,952	8,483	68.1%

Bold – At or exceed capacity
†Season high
