= 2026–27 Utah Utes men's basketball team =

American college basketball season

2026–27 Utah Utes men's basketball
- Conference: Big 12 Conference
- Record: 3–2 (0–0 Big 12)
- Head coach: Alex Jensen (2nd season)
- Assistant coaches: Raphael Chillious (2nd season); Martin Schiller (2nd season); Eric Daniels (2nd season)
- Home arena: Jon M. Huntsman Center (Capacity: 15,000)

2026–27 Big 12 men's basketball standings
	Conf.				Overall
Team	W		L	PCT	W		L	PCT
No. 8 Houston	0	–	0	–	6	–	0	1.000
Arizona State	0	–	0	–	5	–	0	1.000
No. 21 BYU	0	–	0	–	5	–	0	1.000
No. 9 Texas Tech	0	–	0	–	5	–	0	1.000
No. 11 Kansas	0	–	0	–	5	–	1	.833
No. 12 Arizona	0	–	0	–	4	–	1	.800
Baylor	0	–	0	–	4	–	1	.800
Cincinnati	0	–	0	–	4	–	1	.800
TCU	0	–	0	–	4	–	1	.800
UCF	0	–	0	–	4	–	1	.800
Iowa State	0	–	0	–	3	–	1	.750
Kansas State	0	–	0	–	3	–	1	.750
Oklahoma State	0	–	0	–	3	–	1	.750
West Virginia	0	–	0	–	4	–	2	.667
Utah	0	–	0	–	3	–	2	.600
Colorado	0	–	0	–	2	–	3	.400
† 2027 Big 12 tournament winner As of November 21, 2026; Rankings from AP poll

The 2026–27 Utah Runnin' Utes men's basketball team will represent the University of Utah during the 2026–27 NCAA Division I men's basketball season. The team, is led by second year head coach Alex Jensen and play their home games at the Jon M. Huntsman Center located in Salt Lake City, Utah. This is the Utes' third season in the Big 12 Conference.

== Previous season ==
The Utes finished the 2025–26 season 10–22, 2–16 in Big 12 Conference play to finish in sixteenth place. As the No. 16 seed in the Big 12 tournament, Utah lost their first-round game against Cincinnati, 66–73.

== Preseason ==
The Big 12 preseason coaches' poll was released on October 14, 2026. Coaches could not vote for their own team or players.

Big 12 Preseason Coaches Poll

	Big 12 Coaches	Points
1.	Arizona	220 (12)
2.	Houston	214 (4)
3.	Kansas	186
4.	Iowa State	181
5.	Texas Tech	180
6.	BYU	148
7.	TCU	137
T8.	Cincinnati	116
T8.	West Virginia	116
10.	Baylor	102
11.	Oklahoma State	98
12.	Arizona State	75
13.	UCF	55
T14.	Colorado	34
T14.	Kansas State	34
16.	Utah	24
Reference: (#) first-place votes

Big 12 Preseason Media Poll

	Big 12 Coaches
1.	Arizona
2.	Houston
3.	Kansas
4.	Texas Tech
5.	Iowa State
6.	BYU
7.	Baylor
8.	TCU
9.	Cincinnati
10.	West Virginia
11.	Oklahoma State
12.	Arizona State
13.	UCF
14.	Kansas State
15.	Colorado
16.	Utah

All-Big 12 Preseason First team

Player	School	Pos.	Yr.	Ht., Wt.	Hometown (Last School)
Ivan Kharchenkov	Arizona	F	So.	6'7", 230	Munich, Germany (Bayern Munich)
Motiejus Krivas	Arizona	C	Jr.	7'2", 260	Siauliai, Lithuania (BC Žalgiris)
Paulius Murauskas	Arizona State	F	Sr.	6'8", 235	Kaunas, Lithuania (St. Mary's)
Robert Wright III†	BYU	G	Jr.	6'1", 183	Wilmington, DE (Baylor)
Dedan Thomas Jr.	Houston	G	Sr.	6'1", 180	Las Vegas, NV (LSU)
Joseph Tugler	Houston	F	Sr.	6'8", 230	Houston, TX (Cypress Falls HS)
Tamin Lipsey	Iowa State	G	GS	6'1", 200	Ames, IA (Ames HS)
Tyran Stokes	Kansas	G	Fr.	6'7", 230	Louisville, KY (Rainer Beach HS)
Xavier Edmonds	TCU	F	Sr.	6'8", 252	Long Beach, CA (Salt Lake CC)
JT Toppin†	Texas Tech	F	Sr.	6'9", 230	Dallas, TX (New Mexico)
† denotes unanimous selection Reference:

- Player of the Year: Motiejus Krivas, Arizona
- Co-Newcomer of the Year: Paulius Murauskas, Arizona State
- Freshman of the Year: Tyran Stokes, Kansas

== Roster ==
2026–27 Utah Utes men's basketball team
Players
Coaches

Pos.	#	Name	Height	Weight	Year	Previous school	Hometown
G	0	Styles Clemmons	6 ft 0 in (1.83 m)	180 lb (82 kg)	Fr	Overtime Elite	Virginia Beach, VA
C	1	Malek Gomma	6 ft 8 in (2.03 m)	250 lb (113 kg)	Sr	Weber State	Anchorage, AK
G	2	Jackson Holcombe	6 ft 6 in (1.98 m)	225 lb (102 kg)	Jr	Utah Valley	Summerville, SC
F	3	Jaxson Johnson	6 ft 9 in (2.06 m)	215 lb (98 kg)	Fr	Alta HS	Alta, UT
F	5	Babacar Faye	6 ft 9 in (2.06 m)	220 lb (100 kg)	GS	Charleston	Dakar, Senegal
G	6	TJ Burch	6 ft 0 in (1.83 m)	162 lb (73 kg)	Jr	Wright State	Dallas, TX
G	7	David Katoa	6 ft 4 in (1.93 m)	182 lb (83 kg)	Fr	Layton HS	Layton, UT
G	8	Obomate Abbey	6 ft 0 in (1.83 m)	195 lb (88 kg)	So	Jyväskylä Basketball Academy	Jyväskylä, Finland
G	9	Trey Campbell	6 ft 4 in (1.93 m)	188 lb (85 kg)	GS	Northern Iowa	Cedar Falls, IA
G	10	Lucas Langarita	6 ft 6 in (1.98 m)	202 lb (92 kg)	So	Casademont Zaragoza	Zaragoza, Spain
G	11	Taison Chatman	6 ft 5 in (1.96 m)	190 lb (86 kg)	Jr	Ohio State	Minneapolis, MN
C	13	Fynn Schott	6 ft 11 in (2.11 m)	260 lb (118 kg)	Jr	Hestia Menorca	Fürstenfeld, Austria
F	15	Grayson Gaddis	6 ft 7 in (2.01 m)	215 lb (98 kg)	Jr	Montana State	Salt Lake City, UT
F	21	Alec Anigbata	6 ft 9 in (2.06 m)	225 lb (102 kg)	Fr	Ratiopharm Ulm	Munich, Germany
C	55	Lukas McCanna	6 ft 10 in (2.08 m)	235 lb (107 kg)	Fr	Western Reserve Academy (OH)	Evergreen, CO
F	80	Zati Loubaki	6 ft 8 in (2.03 m)	230 lb (104 kg)	Jr	Trinity Valley CC	Nojent Sur Oise, France

Head coach

- Alex Jensen (Utah)

Assistant coach(es)

- Raphael Chillious (Lafayette College)
- Martin Schiller
- Eric Daniels (Johnson & Wales University)

Legend

- (C) Team captain
- (S) Suspended
- (I) Ineligible
- (W) Walk-on
- Injured
- Current redshirt

Roster
Last update: October 15, 2026

== Schedule ==
Date time, TV	Rank^{#}	Opponent^{#}	Result	Record	High points	High rebounds	High assists	Site (attendance) city, state
Exhibition
October 7, 2026*; 8:00 p.m., MW+		at UNLV	W 79–69		17 – Campbell	6 – Holcombe	4 – Holcombe	Thomas & Mack Center (NA); Las Vegas, NV
October 17, 2026*; 2:00 p.m., MW+		at Nevada	L 61–71		14 – Campbell	9 – Holcombe	5 – Campbell	Lawlor Events Center (2,801); Reno, NV
October 21, 2026*; 6:30 p.m., MW+		Oregon	W 81–77		20 – Tied	10 – Gomma	4 – Campbell	Jon M. Huntsman Center (NA); Salt Lake City, UT
Non-conference regular season
November 2, 2026*; 7:00 p.m., ESPN+		Long Beach State	W 66–63	1–0	20 – Campbell	11 – Gomma	8 – Campbell	Jon M. Huntsman Center (6,312); Salt Lake City, UT
November 5, 2026*; 7:00 p.m., ESPN+		Towson	W 67–57	2–0	15 – Chatman	7 – Johnson	6 – Campbell	Jon M. Huntsman Center (6,516); Salt Lake City, UT
November 10, 2026*; 7:00 p.m., ESPN+		Weber State	W 85–64	3–0	21 – Anigbata	8 – J. Johnson	10 – Campbell	Jon M. Huntsman Center (5,742); Salt Lake City, UT
November 14, 2026*; 5:00 p.m., ESPN+		Washington	Postponed due to the FAA nationwide ground stop, makeup on December 5					Jon M. Huntsman Center; Salt Lake City, UT
November 17, 2026*; 6:30 p.m., ESPN+		Eastern Washington	L 67–71	3–1	16 – Anigbata	10 – Anigbata	4 – Holocombe	Jon M. Huntsman Center (5,273); Salt Lake City, UT
November 20, 2026*; 3:30 p.m., ESPN2		vs. Dayton; Charleston Classic	L 46–63	3–2	16 – Campbell	5 – Burch	2 – Tied	TD Arena (2,291); Charleston, SC
November 22, 2026*; 4:00 p.m., ESPN2		vs. Minnesota; Charleston Classic						TD Arena; Charleston, SC
December 2, 2026*; 7:00 p.m., NBCSN/Peacock		California						Jon M. Huntsman Center; Salt Lake City, UT
December 5, 2026*; TBD, ESPN+		Washington						Jon M. Huntsman Center; Salt Lake City, UT
December 9, 2026*; 7:00 p.m., ESPN+		California Baptist						Jon M. Huntsman Center; Salt Lake City, UT
December 13, 2026*; 1:00 p.m., ESPN+		Abilene Christian						Jon M. Huntsman Center; Salt Lake City, UT
December 16, 2026*; 7:00 p.m., ESPN+		Portland						Jon M. Huntsman Center; Salt Lake City, UT
December 19, 2026*; 5:00 p.m., ESPN+		Sam Houston						Jon M. Huntsman Center; Salt Lake City, UT
December 22, 2026*; 5:00 p.m., ESPN+		Southern Utah						Jon M. Huntsman Center; Salt Lake City, UT
December 29, 2026*; 8:00 p.m., ESPN2		Air Force						Jon M. Huntsman Center; Salt Lake City, UT
Big 12 regular season
January 2, 2027; 2:00 p.m., ESPN+		at UCF						Addition Financial Arena; Orlando, FL
January 6, 2027*; 9:00 p.m., ESPN2		Kansas						Jon M. Huntsman Center; Salt Lake City, UT
January 9, 2027*; 5:00 p.m., ESPN2		Cincinnati						Jon M. Huntsman Center; Salt Lake City, UT
January 12, 2027; 6:00 p.m., ESPN+		at Oklahoma State						Gallagher-Iba Arena; Stillwater, OK
January 16, 2027; 8:00 p.m., TNT/TruTV		at BYU; Rivalry						Marriott Center; Provo, UT
January 20, 2027*; 7:00 p.m., NBCSN/Peacock		West Virginia						Jon M. Huntsman Center; Salt Lake City, UT
January 26, 2027; 8:00 p.m., FS1		at Arizona						McKale Center; Tucson, AZ
January 30, 2027*; 8:00 p.m., TNT		Baylor						Jon M. Huntsman Center; Salt Lake City, UT
February 2, 2027; 7:30 p.m., TNT/TruTV		at Iowa State						Hilton Coliseum; Ames, IA
February 6, 2027; 7:30 p.m., ESPN2		BYU; Rivalry						Jon M. Huntsman Center; Salt Lake City, UT
February 10, 2027; 7:30 p.m., ESPN+		Kansas State						Jon M. Huntsman Center; Salt Lake City, UT
February 13, 2027; 2:00 p.m., ESPN2/ESPNU		at Houston						Fertitta Center; Houston, TX
February 16, 2027; 6:00 p.m., ESPN+		at TCU						Schollmaier Arena; Fort Worth, TX
February 20, 2027; 5:00 p.m., ESPN+		Colorado; Rivalry						Jon M. Huntsman Center; Salt Lake City, UT
February 23, 2027; 9:00 p.m., ESPN2		at Arizona State						Desert Financial Arena; Tempe, AZ
February 27, 2027; 5:00 p.m., ESPN+		Oklahoma State						Jon M. Huntsman Center; Salt Lake City, UT
March 2, 2027; 9:00 p.m., ESPN/ESPN2		Texas Tech						Jon M. Huntsman Center; Salt Lake City, UT
March 6, 2027; 5:00 p.m., ESPN+		Colorado						CU Events Center; Boulder, CO
Big 12 tournament
March 9–13, 2027; TBD, ESPN+/ESPN		vs. TBD; First Round						T-Mobile Center; Kansas City, MO
*Non-conference game. ^{#}Rankings from AP poll. (#) Tournament seedings in parentheses. All times are in Mountain Time.
