= 2026–27 Texas Tech Red Raiders basketball team =

American college basketball season

2026–27 Texas Tech Red Raiders basketball
- Conference: Big 12 Conference

Ranking
- Coaches: No. 11
- AP: No. 9
- Record: 5–0 (0–0 Big 12)
- Head coach: Grant McCasland (4th season)
- Assistant coaches: Achoki Moikobu (4th season); Jeff Linder (3rd season); Chris Nottingham (2nd season); Rem Bakamus (2nd season); Toddrick Gotcher (2nd season)
- Home arena: United Supermarkets Arena

2026–27 Big 12 men's basketball standings
	Conf.				Overall
Team	W		L	PCT	W		L	PCT
Arizona State	0	–	0	–	5	–	0	1.000
No. 21 BYU	0	–	0	–	5	–	0	1.000
No. 8 Houston	0	–	0	–	5	–	0	1.000
No. 11 Kansas	0	–	0	–	5	–	0	1.000
No. 9 Texas Tech	0	–	0	–	5	–	0	1.000
TCU	0	–	0	–	4	–	0	1.000
No. 12 Arizona	0	–	0	–	4	–	1	.800
Baylor	0	–	0	–	4	–	1	.800
Cincinnati	0	–	0	–	4	–	1	.800
UCF	0	–	0	–	4	–	1	.800
West Virginia	0	–	0	–	4	–	1	.800
Iowa State	0	–	0	–	3	–	1	.750
Kansas State	0	–	0	–	3	–	1	.750
Oklahoma State	0	–	0	–	3	–	1	.750
Utah	0	–	0	–	3	–	1	.750
Colorado	0	–	0	–	2	–	3	.400
† 2027 Big 12 tournament winner As of November 19, 2026; Rankings from AP poll

The 2026–27 Texas Tech Red Raiders basketball team will represent Texas Tech University during the 2026–27 NCAA Division I men's basketball season as a member of the Big 12 Conference. The Red Raiders were led by fourth-year coach Grant McCasland, and will play their home games at the United Supermarkets Arena located in Lubbock, Texas.

== Previous season ==
The Red Raiders finished the 2025–26 season 23–11, 12–6 in Big 12 play to finish in a tie for third place. Texas Tech entered as the No. 4 seed of the Big 12 tournament, held at T-Mobile Center in Kansas City, Missouri, they lost to Iowa State in the quarterfinals, 53–75. Texas Tech earned an at-large bid to the NCAA tournament as the No. 4 seed in the Midwest Region. In the first round, they defeated No. 12 seed Akron, 91–71. The Red Raiders were eliminated with an 65–90 loss to No. 5 seed Alabama.

== Preseason ==
The Big 12 preseason coaches & media poll will be released in October 2026. All awards will be voted on by the league's 16 head coaches, who can not vote for their own team or players.

Big 12 Preseason Coaches Poll

	Big 12 Coaches	Points
1.	Arizona	220 (12)
2.	Houston	214 (4)
3.	Kansas	186
4.	Iowa State	181
5.	Texas Tech	180
6.	BYU	148
7.	TCU	137
T8.	Cincinnati	116
T8.	West Virginia	116
10.	Baylor	102
11.	Oklahoma State	98
12.	Arizona State	75
13.	UCF	55
T14.	Colorado	34
T14.	Kansas State	34
16.	Utah	24
Reference: (#) first-place votes

Big 12 Preseason Media Poll

	Big 12 Coaches
1.	Arizona
2.	Houston
3.	Kansas
4.	Texas Tech
5.	Iowa State
6.	BYU
7.	Baylor
8.	TCU
9.	Cincinnati
10.	West Virginia
11.	Oklahoma State
12.	Arizona State
13.	UCF
14.	Kansas State
15.	Colorado
16.	Utah

All-Big 12 Preseason First team

Player	School	Pos.	Yr.	Ht., Wt.	Hometown (Last School)
Ivan Kharchenkov	Arizona	F	So.	6'7", 230	Munich, Germany (Bayern Munich)
Motiejus Krivas	Arizona	C	Jr.	7'2", 260	Siauliai, Lithuania (BC Žalgiris)
Paulius Murauskas	Arizona State	F	Sr.	6'8", 235	Kaunas, Lithuania (St. Mary's)
Robert Wright III†	BYU	G	Jr.	6'1", 183	Wilmington, DE (Baylor)
Dedan Thomas Jr.	Houston	G	Sr.	6'1", 180	Las Vegas, NV (LSU)
Joseph Tugler	Houston	F	Sr.	6'8", 230	Houston, TX (Cypress Falls HS)
Tamin Lipsey	Iowa State	G	GS	6'1", 200	Ames, IA (Ames HS)
Tyran Stokes	Kansas	G	Fr.	6'7", 230	Louisville, KY (Rainer Beach HS)
Xavier Edmonds	TCU	F	Sr.	6'8", 252	Long Beach, CA (Salt Lake CC)
JT Toppin†	Texas Tech	F	Sr.	6'9", 230	Dallas, TX (New Mexico)
† denotes unanimous selection Reference:

- Player of the Year: Motiejus Krivas, Arizona
- Co-Newcomer of the Year: Paulius Murauskas, Arizona State
- Freshman of the Year: Tyran Stokes, Kansas

== Roster ==
2026–27 Texas Tech Red Raiders men's basketball team
Players
Coaches

Pos.	#	Name	Height	Weight	Year	Previous school	Hometown
G	0	DaKari Spear	6 ft 5 in (1.96 m)	195 lb (88 kg)	Fr	Dynamic Prep	The Colony, TX
G	1	Damarion Dennis	6 ft 1 in (1.85 m)	170 lb (77 kg)	Jr	Wyoming	San Antonio, TX
F	2	Josiah Moseley	6 ft 8 in (2.03 m)	230 lb (104 kg)	Jr	Villanova	Round Rock, TX
G	3	Cruz Davis	6 ft 3 in (1.91 m)	185 lb (84 kg)	Sr	Hofstra	Plano, TX
G	4	Dra Gibbs-Lawhorn	6 ft 1 in (1.85 m)	185 lb (84 kg)	Sr	UNLV	Lafayette, IN
F	5	Darrion Williams	6 ft 5 in (1.96 m)	225 lb (102 kg)	GS	NC State	Sacramento, CA
G	7	Amari Barrett	6 ft 4 in (1.93 m)	180 lb (82 kg)	Fr	Millwood HS	Oklahoma City, OK
F	11	Trey Hall	6 ft 6 in (1.98 m)	215 lb (98 kg)	Fr	North Crowley HS	Crowley, TX
F	13	Marial Akuentok	6 ft 11 in (2.11 m)	240 lb (109 kg)	RS So	Fort Erie International	Edmonton, Alberta, Canada
F	15	JT Toppin	6 ft 9 in (2.06 m)	225 lb (102 kg)	Sr	New Mexico	Dallas, TX
F	21	LaTrell Hoover	7 ft 0 in (2.13 m)	230 lb (104 kg)	So	Samuel Clemens HS	San Antonio, TX
F	33	Bassala Bagayoko	6 ft 10 in (2.08 m)	210 lb (95 kg)	Fr	Bilbao Basket	Bamako, Mali
F	55	Jamichael Stillwell (I)	6 ft 8 in (2.03 m)	245 lb (111 kg)	GS	UCF	Atlanta, GA

Head coach

- Grant McCasland (Baylor)

Assistant coach(es)

- Matt Braeuer (Wichita State)
- Achoki Moikobu (Fort Hays State)
- Luke Barnwell (Newman)
- Jeff Linder (Western State)

Legend

- (C) Team captain
- (S) Suspended
- (I) Ineligible
- (W) Walk-on
- Injured
- Current redshirt

Roster
Last update: July 24, 2026

== Schedule and results ==
Date time, TV	Rank^{#}	Opponent^{#}	Result	Record	High points	High rebounds	High assists	Site (attendance) city, state
Non-conference regular season
October 23, 2026*; 6:00 p.m., SECN+	No. 19	at No. 23 Kentucky	L 65–76	–	11 – Tied	10 – Moseley	7 – Davis	Rupp Arena (19,228); Lexington, KY
Non-conference regular season
November 2, 2026*; 6:00 p.m., CBSSN	No. 19	Jackson State	W 76–42	1–0	22 – Dennis	8 – Moseley	5 – Davis	United Supermarkets Arena (13,087); Lubbock, TX
November 5, 2026*; 8:00 p.m., ESPN+	No. 19	Bethune–Cookman	W 76–58	2–0	25 – Gibbs-Lawhorn	9 – Moseley	3 – Davis	United Supermarkets Arena (12,548); Lubbock, TX
November 10, 2026*; 7:00 p.m., Peacock	No. 16	No. 3 Illinois	W 84–78	3–0	20 – Davis	13 – Stillwell	5 – Davis	United Supermarkets Arena (15,098); Lubbock, TX
November 14, 2026*; 1:00 p.m., ESPN+	No. 16	Stonehill	W 88–37	4–0	22 – Spear	12 – Stillwell	6 – Davis	United Supermarkets Arena (11,869); Lubbock, TX
November 18, 2026*; 6:30 p.m., ESPN+	No. 9	LSU New Orleans	W 86–41	5–0	20 – Davis	11 – Stillwell	4 – Tied	United Supermarkets Arena (11,791); Lubbock, TX
November 24, 2026*; 7:00 p.m., ESPN		vs. Louisville; Players Era 16 Bracket 1 First Round						Michelob Ultra Arena/T-Mobile Arena; Las Vegas, NV
November 26, 2026*; TBD, TBD		vs. Oregon/St. John's; Players Era 16						Michelob Ultra Arena/T-Mobile Arena; Las Vegas, NV
November 27, 2026*; TBD, TBD		vs. TBA; Players Era 16						Michelob Ultra Arena/T-Mobile Arena; Las Vegas, NV
November 28, 2026*; TBD, TBD		vs. TBA; Players Era 16						Michelob Ultra Arena/T-Mobile Arena; Las Vegas, NV
December 8, 2026*; 6:30 p.m., ESPN+		Omaha						United Supermarkets Arena; Lubbock, TX
December 13, 2026*; 1:00 p.m., ESPN2		vs. USC; Coast-to-Coast Challenge						Dickies Arena; Fort Worth, TX
December 15, 2026*; 6:30 p.m., ESPN+		Incarnate Word						United Supermarkets Arena; Lubbock, TX
December 21, 2026*; 6:00 p.m., Prime Video		vs. Duke						Madison Square Garden; New York City, NY
December 28, 2026*; 6:30 p.m., ESPN+		Mississippi Valley State						United Supermarkets Arena; Lubbock, TX
Big 12 regular season
January 2, 2027; 11:00 a.m., Fox		at Cincinnati						Fifth Third Arena; Cincinnati, OH
January 6, 2027; 7:00 p.m., Peacock		Baylor						United Supermarkets Arena; Lubbock, TX
January 9, 2027; 1:00 p.m., TNT		at TCU						Schollmaier Arena; Fort Worth, TX
January 12, 2027; 9:00 p.m., FS1		Arizona State						United Supermarkets Arena; Lubbock, TX
January 16, 2027; 7:00 p.m., ESPN/ESPN2		Iowa State						United Supermarkets Arena; Lubbock, TX
January 19, 2027; 6:00 p.m., ESPN/ESPN2/ESPNU		at Houston						Fertitta Center; Houston, TX
January 22, 2027; 7:00 p.m., Fox		Arizona						United Supermarkets Arena; Lubbock, TX
January 27, 2027; 8:00 p.m., Peacock		at Oklahoma State						Gallagher-Iba Arena; Stillwater, OK
January 30, 2027; 3:00 p.m., ESPN/ESPN2		UCF						United Supermarkets Arena; Lubbock, TX
February 2, 2027; 10:00 p.m., ESPN		at Colorado						CU Events Center; Boulder, CO
February 6, 2027; 11:00 a.m., ABC		at Kansas						Allen Fieldhouse; Lawrence, KS
February 13, 2027; 5:00 p.m., ESPN2		West Virginia						United Supermarkets Arena; Lubbock, TX
February 15, 2027; 8:00 p.m., ESPN		Houston						United Supermarkets Arena; Lubbock, TX
February 20, 2027; 5:00/5:30 p.m., ESPN2/ESPNU		at UCF						Addition Financial Arena; Orlando, FL
February 24, 2027; 6:00 p.m., ESPN2/ESPNU		at Kansas State						Bramlage Coliseum; Manhattan, KS
February 27, 2027; 4:00/4:30 p.m., ESPN/ESPN2		Cincinnati						United Supermarkets Arena; Lubbock, TX
March 2, 2027; 10:00 p.m., ESPN/ESPN2		at Utah						Jon M. Huntsman Center; Salt Lake City, UT
March 6, 2027; 8:00 p.m., FS1		BYU						United Supermarkets Arena; Lubbock, TX
Big 12 tournament
March 9–13, 2027; TBD, ESPN+/ESPN		vs. TBD; First Round						T-Mobile Center; Kansas City, MO
*Non-conference game. ^{#}Rankings from AP poll. (#) Tournament seedings in parentheses. All times are in Central Time.

== Rankings ==
Ranking movements Legend: ██ Increase in ranking ██ Decrease in ranking
	Week																				
Poll	Pre	1	2	3	4	5	6	7	8	9	10	11	12	13	14	15	16	17	18	19	Final
AP	19	16	9																		
Coaches	16	17	11																		
