= 2026–27 Cincinnati Bearcats men's basketball team =

American college basketball season

2026–27 Cincinnati Bearcats men's basketball
- Conference: Big 12 Conference
- Record: 5–1 (0–0 Big 12)
- Head coach: Jerrod Calhoun (1st season)
- Associate head coach: Manitoris Robinson (1st season)
- Assistant coaches: Ben Asher (1st season); Johnny Hill (1st season); Max Bent (1st season); Curran Walsh (1st season); Mike Fuline (1st season)
- Home arena: Fifth Third Arena

2026–27 Big 12 men's basketball standings
	Conf.				Overall
Team	W		L	PCT	W		L	PCT
No. 8 Houston	0	–	0	–	6	–	0	1.000
Arizona State	0	–	0	–	5	–	0	1.000
No. 21 BYU	0	–	0	–	5	–	0	1.000
No. 9 Texas Tech	0	–	0	–	5	–	0	1.000
No. 11 Kansas	0	–	0	–	5	–	1	.833
No. 12 Arizona	0	–	0	–	4	–	1	.800
Baylor	0	–	0	–	4	–	1	.800
Cincinnati	0	–	0	–	4	–	1	.800
TCU	0	–	0	–	4	–	1	.800
Iowa State	0	–	0	–	3	–	1	.750
West Virginia	0	–	0	–	4	–	2	.667
UCF	0	–	0	–	4	–	2	.667
Kansas State	0	–	0	–	3	–	2	.600
Oklahoma State	0	–	0	–	3	–	2	.600
Utah	0	–	0	–	3	–	2	.600
Colorado	0	–	0	–	2	–	3	.400
† 2027 Big 12 tournament winner As of November 22, 2026; Rankings from AP poll

The 2026–27 Cincinnati Bearcats men's basketball team represents the University of Cincinnati during the 2026–27 NCAA Division I men's basketball season. The Bearcats are led by first-year head coach Jerrod Calhoun, and will play their home games at Fifth Third Arena in Cincinnati, Ohio as fourth-year members of the Big 12 Conference.

== Previous season ==
The Bearcats finished the season 18–15 and 9–9 in Big 12 play to finish in tie for 7th place in the conference standings, thus earning the 9th seed in the 2026 Big 12 men's basketball tournament. They defeated Utah in the first round before losing to UCF in the second round. The Bearcats did not get selected to play in the NCAA tournament, and declined an invite to the College Basketball Crown.

== Offseason ==
=== Coaching staff changes ===
Cincinnati announced on March 19, 2026 that Wes Miller would not return as head coach for the next season. Ohio native and UC alum Jerrod Calhoun was announced as the 29th men's basketball head coach on March 24, 2026. Calhoun's coaching staff was announced on April 07, 2026.

=== Departures ===
Cincinnati Departing Players
Name	Pos.	Height	Weight	Year	Hometown	Reason
Shon Abaev	G	6' 8"	195	Sophomore	Fort Lauderdale, FL	Transferred to Florida State
Bryson Buckingham	G	6' 2"	180	Sophomore	Edmond, OK	Transferred to Southern Nazarene
Jalen Celestine	G	6' 7"	220	Graduate student	Ajax, Ontario	Completed college eligibility
Grant Darbyshire	G	6' 2"	190	Graduate student	Cincinnati, OH	Completed college eligibility
Sencire Harris	G	6' 4"	175	Senior	Canton, OH	Transferred to Eastern Michigan
Jalen Haynes	F	6' 8"	250	Graduate student	Fort Lauderdale, FL	Transferred to Dayton
Jizzle James	G	6' 3"	205	Junior	Orlando, FL	Transferred to Charlotte
Tyler McKinley	F	6' 9"	240	(redshirt) Sophomore	Cincinnati, OH	Transferred to Charlotte
Baba Miller	F	6' 11"	225	Senior	Mallorca, Spain	Completed college eligibility, declared for NBA draft; Selected 36th overall by Los Angeles Clippers
Jordi Rodriguez	G	6' 6"	195	Sophomore	Barcelona, Spain	Transferred to Charlotte
Moustapha Thiam	C	7' 2"	235	Junior	Dakar, Senegal	Transferred to Michigan
Day Day Thomas	G	6' 1"	190	Graduate student	Columbia, SC	Completed college eligibility
Keyshuan Tillery	G	6' 0"	184	Sophomore	Albany, NY	Transferred to Charlotte

=== Incoming transfers ===
Cincinnati incoming transfers
Name	Number	Pos.	Height	Weight	Year	Hometown	Old school	Remaining Eligibility
Riley Allenspach	35	C	6' 11"	247	Senior	Charlotte, NC	George Mason	One year
Javontae Campbell	3	G	6' 3"	185	Fifth year	Muskogee, OK	Bowling Green	One year
Trevian Carson	0	G	6' 3"	200	Senior	West Des Moines, IA	North Dakota State	One year
MJ Collins	2	G	6' 4"	195	Fifth year	Clover, SC	Utah State	One year
Myles Colvin	6	F	6' 5"	212	Senior	Indianapolis, IN	Wake Forest	One year
Adlan Elamin	9	F	6' 9"	185	Sophomore	Fairfax, VA	Utah State	Three years
Akai Fleming	5	G	6' 4"	184	Sophomore	Atlanta, GA	Georgia Tech	Three years
Jayden Hastings	22	C	6' 9"	240	(redshirt) Junior	Orlando, FL	Boston College	Two years
David Iweze	11	C	6' 10"	240	Sophomore	Roanoke, TX	Utah State	Four years
Amani Lyles	7	F	6' 9"	240	Fifth year	Columbus, OH	Akron	One year
Eric Mahaffey	20	F	6' 6"	200	(redshirt) Sophomore	Cincinnati, OH	Akron	Three years
Elijah Perryman	1	G	6' 2"	190	Sophomore	San Francisco, CA	Utah State	Three years
Tylen Riley	10	G	6' 1"	170	Senior	Las Vegas, NV	Tulsa	One year
Tyler Tejada	8	G/F	6' 9"	230	Senior	Teaneck, NJ	Towson	One year
Deshaun Vaden	32	F	6' 11"	210	Junior	Cleveland, OH	Mount Union (DIII)	Two years

== Preseason ==
Cincinnati took part in the CareSource Invitational exhibition series along with Dayton, Xavier and Ohio State, taking place on October 07, 2026, at the Lindner Family Tennis Center, home of the Cincinnati Open.

Big 12 Preseason Coaches Poll

	Big 12 Coaches	Points
1.	Arizona	220 (12)
2.	Houston	214 (4)
3.	Kansas	186
4.	Iowa State	181
5.	Texas Tech	180
6.	BYU	148
7.	TCU	137
T8.	Cincinnati	116
T8.	West Virginia	116
10.	Baylor	102
11.	Oklahoma State	98
12.	Arizona State	75
13.	UCF	55
T14.	Colorado	34
T14.	Kansas State	34
16.	Utah	24
Reference: (#) first-place votes

Big 12 Preseason Media Poll

	Big 12 Coaches
1.	Arizona
2.	Houston
3.	Kansas
4.	Texas Tech
5.	Iowa State
6.	BYU
7.	Baylor
8.	TCU
9.	Cincinnati
10.	West Virginia
11.	Oklahoma State
12.	Arizona State
13.	UCF
14.	Kansas State
15.	Colorado
16.	Utah

All-Big 12 Preseason First team

Player	School	Pos.	Yr.	Ht., Wt.	Hometown (Last School)
Ivan Kharchenkov	Arizona	F	So.	6'7", 230	Munich, Germany (Bayern Munich)
Motiejus Krivas	Arizona	C	Jr.	7'2", 260	Siauliai, Lithuania (BC Žalgiris)
Paulius Murauskas	Arizona State	F	Sr.	6'8", 235	Kaunas, Lithuania (St. Mary's)
Robert Wright III†	BYU	G	Jr.	6'1", 183	Wilmington, DE (Baylor)
Dedan Thomas Jr.	Houston	G	Sr.	6'1", 180	Las Vegas, NV (LSU)
Joseph Tugler	Houston	F	Sr.	6'8", 230	Houston, TX (Cypress Falls HS)
Tamin Lipsey	Iowa State	G	GS	6'1", 200	Ames, IA (Ames HS)
Tyran Stokes	Kansas	G	Fr.	6'7", 230	Louisville, KY (Rainer Beach HS)
Xavier Edmonds	TCU	F	Sr.	6'8", 252	Long Beach, CA (Salt Lake CC)
JT Toppin†	Texas Tech	F	Sr.	6'9", 230	Dallas, TX (New Mexico)
† denotes unanimous selection Reference:

- Player of the Year: Motiejus Krivas, Arizona
- Co-Newcomer of the Year: Paulius Murauskas, Arizona State
- Freshman of the Year: Tyran Stokes, Kansas

== Roster ==
2026–27 Cincinnati Bearcats men's basketball team
Players
Coaches

Pos.	#	Name	Height	Weight	Year	Previous school	Hometown
G	1	Elijah Perryman	6 ft 2 in (1.88 m)	190 lb (86 kg)	So	Utah State	San Francisco, California
F	11	David Iweze	6 ft 10 in (2.08 m)	240 lb (109 kg)	So	Utah State	Roanoke, Texas
G/F	9	Adlan Elamin	6 ft 9 in (2.06 m)	185 lb (84 kg)	So	Utah State	Arlington, Virginia
F/C	35	Riley Allenspach	6 ft 11 in (2.11 m)	250 lb (113 kg)	Sr	George Mason	Charlotte, NC
G	0	Trevian Carson	6 ft 4 in (1.93 m)	200 lb (91 kg)	Sr	North Dakota State	West Des Moines, IA
G	6	Myles Colvin	6 ft 5 in (1.96 m)	212 lb (96 kg)	Sr	Wake Forest	Indianapolis, Indiana
F	22	Jayden Hastings	6 ft 9 in (2.06 m)	240 lb (109 kg)	RS Jr	Boston College	Orlando, FL
G	20	Eric Mahaffey	6 ft 6 in (1.98 m)	200 lb (91 kg)	RS So	Akron	Cincinnati, Ohio
G	10	Tylen Riley	6 ft 3 in (1.91 m)	190 lb (86 kg)	Sr	Memphis	Las Vegas, NV
G/F	8	Tyler Tejada	6 ft 9 in (2.06 m)	230 lb (104 kg)	Sr	Towson	Teaneck, New Jersey
G	5	Akai Fleming	6 ft 4 in (1.93 m)	184 lb (83 kg)	So	Georgia Tech	Marietta, GA
F	32	Deshaun Vaden	6 ft 11 in (2.11 m)	210 lb (95 kg)	Jr	Mount Union	Cleveland, OH
G	2	MJ Collins Jr.	6 ft 4 in (1.93 m)	195 lb (88 kg)	GS	Utah State	Clover, South Carolina
G	3	Javontae Campbell	6 ft 3 in (1.91 m)	185 lb (84 kg)	GS	Bowling Green	Muskogee, Oklahoma
G	13	Grant Darbyshire	6 ft 2 in (1.88 m)	190 lb (86 kg)	GS	Kentucky	Cincinnati, OH
F	7	Amani Lyles	6 ft 9 in (2.06 m)	240 lb (109 kg)	GS	Akron	Columbus, Ohio

Head coach

- Jerrod Calhoun (Cincinnati)

Assistant coach(es)

- Mantoris Robinson (Winthrop)
- Ben Asher (West Virginia)
- Johnny Hill (UT Arlington)
- Max Bent (Michigan)
- Curran Walsh (Lindenwood–Belleville)
- Mike Fuline (Kent State)
- Jason Slay (West Virginia State)

Legend

- (C) Team captain
- (S) Suspended
- (I) Ineligible
- (W) Walk-on
- Injured
- Current redshirt

Roster

== Schedule and results ==
Date time, TV	Rank^{#}	Opponent^{#}	Result	Record	High points	High rebounds	High assists	Site (attendance) city, state
Exhibition
October 7, 2026*; 3:00 p.m.		vs. Ohio State; CareSource Invitational	W 79–68		23 – Riley	8 – Elamin	5 – Perryman	Lindner Family Tennis Center (NA); Mason, OH
October 17, 2026*; 5:00 p.m.		Illinois	L 96–105		31 – Riley	5 – Riley	13 – Riley	Fifth Third Arena (6,347); Cincinnati, OH
October 27, 2026*; 7:00 p.m.		Oakland	W 97–58		22 – Collins	6 – Colvin	10 – Perryman	Fifth Third Arena; Cincinnati, OH
Regular season
November 2, 2026*; 7:00 p.m., ESPN+		American	W 79–53	1–0	13 – Tied	7 – Tied	5 – Tied	Fifth Third Arena (9,420); Cincinnati, OH
November 5, 2026*; 7:00 p.m., ESPN+		Green Bay	W 81–64	2–0	31 – Colvin	7 – Colvin	6 – Collins	Fifth Third Arena (9,003); Cincinnati, OH
November 9, 2026*; 7:00 p.m., ESPN+		Minnesota; Twyman-Stokes Classic	L 61–63	2–1	25 – Riley	5 – Tied	3 – Tied	Fifth Third Arena (10,419); Cincinnati, OH
November 14, 2026*; 7:30 p.m., ESPN+		at Dayton	W 95–72	3–1	20 – Allenspach	9 – Tejada	4 – Perryman	UD Arena (13,407); Dayton, OH
November 18, 2026*; 7:30 p.m., ESPN+		Youngstown State	W 91–54	4–1	21 – Tejada	6 – Mahaffey	11 – Perryman	Fifth Third Arena (9,009); Cincinnati, OH
November 22, 2026*; 2:00 p.m., ESPN+		UMass Lowell	W 78–68	5–1	24 – Riley	6 – Hastings	4 – Perryman	Fifth Third Arena; Cincinnati, OH
November 26, 2026*; 11:00 am, ESPN		vs. Georgia; ESPN Events Invitational Magic Group						ESPN Wide World of Sports Complex; Kissimmee, FL
November 27, 2026*; 4:30 pm, ACCN		vs. Boston College; ESPN Events Invitational Magic Group						ESPN Wide World of Sports Complex; Kissimmee, FL
December 2, 2026*; 7:00 p.m., ESPN+		Monmouth						Fifth Third Arena; Cincinnati, OH
December 5, 2026*; 8:00 p.m., ESPN2		Xavier; Crosstown Shootout						Fifth Third Arena; Cincinnati, OH
December 14, 2026*; 7:00 p.m., ESPN+		Stetson						Fifth Third Arena; Cincinnati, OH
December 19, 2026*; 9:00 p.m., ESPNU		vs. Clemson; Cincinnati Clash						Heritage Bank Center; Cincinnati, OH
December 22, 2026*; 7:00 p.m., ESPN+		Marist						Fifth Third Arena; Cincinnati, OH
December 29, 2026*; 5:00 p.m., ESPN+		Bethune–Cookman						Fifth Third Arena; Cincinnati, OH
Big 12 regular season
January 2, 2027; 12:00 p.m., FOX		Texas Tech						Fifth Third Arena; Cincinnati, OH
January 6, 2027; 10:30 p.m., FS1		at BYU						Marriott Center; Provo, UT
January 9, 2027; 7:00 p.m., ESPN+		at Utah						Jon M. Huntsman Center; Salt Lake City, UT
January 12, 2027; 6:30 p.m., CBSSN		TCU						Fifth Third Arena; Cincinnati, OH
January 16, 2027; 12:00 p.m., Peacock		at West Virginia rivalry						WVU Coliseum; Morgantown, WV
January 19, 2027; 8:30 p.m., FS1		Kansas						Fifth Third Arena; Cincinnati, OH
January 23, 2027; 3:00 p.m., ESPN+		at Colorado						CU Events Center; Boulder, CO
January 30, 2027; 7:00 p.m., Peacock		Arizona State						Fifth Third Arena; Cincinnati, OH
February 2, 2027; 7:00 p.m., Peacock		Arizona						Fifth Third Arena; Cincinnati, OH
February 6, 2027; 2:00 p.m., FS1		at Oklahoma State						Gallagher-Iba Arena; Stillwater, OK
February 9, 2027; 9:00 p.m., TNT/truTV		at Baylor						Foster Pavilion; Waco, TX
February 13, 2027; 2:00 p.m., ESPN+		UCF						Fifth Third Arena; Cincinnati, OH
February 16, 2027; 8:00 p.m., Peacock		at Iowa State						Hilton Coliseum; Ames, IA
February 20, 2027; 6:30 p.m., FS1		Kansas State						Fifth Third Arena; Cincinnati, OH
February 24, 2027; 6:30 p.m., FS1		West Virginia rivalry						Fifth Third Arena; Cincinnati, OH
February 27, 2027; TBD, ESPN/2		at Texas Tech						United Supermarkets Arena; Lubbock, TX
March 2, 2027; 7:00 p.m., Peacock		Houston						Fifth Third Arena; Cincinnati, OH
March 6, 2027; 5:00 p.m., ESPN+		at Kansas State						Bramlage Coliseum; Manhattan, KS
Big 12 tournament
March 9–13, 2027; TBD, ESPN+/ESPN		vs. TBD; First Round						T-Mobile Center; Kansas City, MO
*Non-conference game. ^{#}Rankings from AP poll. (#) Tournament seedings in parentheses. All times are in Mountain Standard Time.
