= 2026–27 UCF Knights men's basketball team =

American college basketball season

2026–27 UCF Knights men's basketball
- Conference: Big 12 Conference
- Record: 4–2 (0–0 Big 12)
- Head coach: Johnny Dawkins (11th season)
- Assistant coaches: Robbie Laing (11th season); Tyson Waterman (4th season); Adam Hood (3rd season); Dwayne Anderson II (2nd season)
- Home arena: Addition Financial Arena

2026–27 Big 12 men's basketball standings
	Conf.				Overall
Team	W		L	PCT	W		L	PCT
No. 8 Houston	0	–	0	–	6	–	0	1.000
Arizona State	0	–	0	–	5	–	0	1.000
No. 21 BYU	0	–	0	–	5	–	0	1.000
No. 9 Texas Tech	0	–	0	–	5	–	0	1.000
No. 11 Kansas	0	–	0	–	5	–	1	.833
No. 12 Arizona	0	–	0	–	4	–	1	.800
Baylor	0	–	0	–	4	–	1	.800
Cincinnati	0	–	0	–	4	–	1	.800
TCU	0	–	0	–	4	–	1	.800
Iowa State	0	–	0	–	3	–	1	.750
West Virginia	0	–	0	–	4	–	2	.667
UCF	0	–	0	–	4	–	2	.667
Kansas State	0	–	0	–	3	–	2	.600
Oklahoma State	0	–	0	–	3	–	2	.600
Utah	0	–	0	–	3	–	2	.600
Colorado	0	–	0	–	2	–	3	.400
† 2027 Big 12 tournament winner As of November 21, 2026; Rankings from AP poll

The 2026–27 UCF Knights men's basketball team will represent the University of Central Florida during the 2026–27 NCAA Division I men's basketball season, marking their fourth season as members of the Big 12 Conference. The Knights, in the program's 58th season of basketball, are led by eleventh-year head coach Johnny Dawkins and play their home games at the Addition Financial Arena.

== Previous season ==
The Knights finished the 2025–26 season 21–12, 9–9 in Big 12 Play to finish in a tie for 7th place. They received the No. 8 seed in the Big 12 Tournament and defeated Cincinnati in the second round, 66–65 in overtime. The Knights were defeated in the quarterfinals against No. 1 seed Arizona, 57–78.

The Knights received a bid to the NCAA tournament, where they were No. 10 seed in the East Region. In the first round matchup, the Knights were defeated by No. 7 seed UCLA, 71–75.

== Preseason ==
The Big 12 preseason coaches & media poll will be released in October 2026. All awards will be voted on by the league's 16 head coaches, who can not vote for their own team or players.

Big 12 Preseason Coaches Poll

	Big 12 Coaches	Points
1.	Arizona	220 (12)
2.	Houston	214 (4)
3.	Kansas	186
4.	Iowa State	181
5.	Texas Tech	180
6.	BYU	148
7.	TCU	137
T8.	Cincinnati	116
T8.	West Virginia	116
10.	Baylor	102
11.	Oklahoma State	98
12.	Arizona State	75
13.	UCF	55
T14.	Colorado	34
T14.	Kansas State	34
16.	Utah	24
Reference: (#) first-place votes

Big 12 Preseason Media Poll

	Big 12 Coaches
1.	Arizona
2.	Houston
3.	Kansas
4.	Texas Tech
5.	Iowa State
6.	BYU
7.	Baylor
8.	TCU
9.	Cincinnati
10.	West Virginia
11.	Oklahoma State
12.	Arizona State
13.	UCF
14.	Kansas State
15.	Colorado
16.	Utah

All-Big 12 Preseason First team

Player	School	Pos.	Yr.	Ht., Wt.	Hometown (Last School)
Ivan Kharchenkov	Arizona	F	So.	6'7", 230	Munich, Germany (Bayern Munich)
Motiejus Krivas	Arizona	C	Jr.	7'2", 260	Siauliai, Lithuania (BC Žalgiris)
Paulius Murauskas	Arizona State	F	Sr.	6'8", 235	Kaunas, Lithuania (St. Mary's)
Robert Wright III†	BYU	G	Jr.	6'1", 183	Wilmington, DE (Baylor)
Dedan Thomas Jr.	Houston	G	Sr.	6'1", 180	Las Vegas, NV (LSU)
Joseph Tugler	Houston	F	Sr.	6'8", 230	Houston, TX (Cypress Falls HS)
Tamin Lipsey	Iowa State	G	GS	6'1", 200	Ames, IA (Ames HS)
Tyran Stokes	Kansas	G	Fr.	6'7", 230	Louisville, KY (Rainer Beach HS)
Xavier Edmonds	TCU	F	Sr.	6'8", 252	Long Beach, CA (Salt Lake CC)
JT Toppin†	Texas Tech	F	Sr.	6'9", 230	Dallas, TX (New Mexico)
† denotes unanimous selection Reference:

- Player of the Year: Motiejus Krivas, Arizona
- Co-Newcomer of the Year: Paulius Murauskas, Arizona State
- Freshman of the Year: Tyran Stokes, Kansas

== Roster ==
2026–27 UCF Knights men's basketball team
Players
Coaches

Pos.	#	Name	Height	Weight	Year	Previous school	Hometown
G	0	Cayden Vasko	6 ft 6 in (1.98 m)	190 lb (86 kg)	Sr	Wofford	Lowell, IN
G	1	Dior Johnson	6 ft 3 in (1.91 m)	190 lb (86 kg)	RS Sr	Tarleton State	Kingston, N.Y.
G	2	Arturo Dean	5 ft 11 in (1.8 m)	165 lb (75 kg)	RS Sr	Oklahoma State	Miami, FL
G	3	Mister Dean	6 ft 6 in (1.98 m)	200 lb (91 kg)	RS So	Charleston	Miami, FL
G/F	4	Ladarius Green	6 ft 10 in (2.08 m)	235 lb (107 kg)	Fr	Petersburg High School	Montgomery, AL
F	5	Lewis Walker	6 ft 6 in (1.98 m)	230 lb (104 kg)	RS So	NC A&T	Winston-Salem, NC
C	7	John Bol	7 ft 2 in (2.18 m)	235 lb (107 kg)	Jr	Ole Miss	Boma, South Sudan
F/C	9	Churchill Abass	6 ft 9 in (2.06 m)	235 lb (107 kg)	Sr	LSU New Orleans	Edo State, Nigeria
F	11	Dylan Mann	6 ft 8 in (2.03 m)	210 lb (95 kg)	Fr	IV Greatness Academy	Pittsboro, NC
G	12	Jahda Swann	6 ft 5 in (1.96 m)	190 lb (86 kg)	Fr	St. James Academy (KS)	Brooklyn, NY
C	19	Elijah Hulsewe	7 ft 0 in (2.13 m)	260 lb (118 kg)	RS Sr	Bethune-Cookman	Orlando, FL
G	24	Carmelo Pacheco	6 ft 5 in (1.96 m)	190 lb (86 kg)	Sr	Mount St. Mary's	Harrisonburg, Virginia
G	30	Tanner Jones	6 ft 4 in (1.93 m)	200 lb (91 kg)	So	IMG Academy (FL)	Memphis, Tennessee
G	32	Isaiah Malone	6 ft 9 in (2.06 m)	220 lb (100 kg)	So	FGCU	LaGrange, IN
F	55	Jason Asemota	6 ft 8 in (2.03 m)	205 lb (93 kg)	Jr	Boston College	Lynn, MA

Head coach

- Johnny Dawkins (Duke)

Assistant coach(es)

- Robbie Laing (Troy)
- Dwayne Anderson II (Villanova)
- Tyson Waterman (Winthrop)
- Adam Hood (Air Force)

Legend

- (C) Team captain
- (S) Suspended
- (I) Ineligible
- (W) Walk-on
- Injured
- Current redshirt

Roster
Last update: October 15, 2026

== Schedule and results ==
Date time, TV	Rank^{#}	Opponent^{#}	Result	Record	High points	High rebounds	High assists	Site (attendance) city, state
Exhibition
October 14, 2026*; 8:00 p.m., ESPN+		at LSU	L 81–85		18 – Johnson	8 – Bol	5 – Vasko	Pete Maravich Assembly Center (1,772); Baton Rouge, LA
October 28, 2026*; 6:00 p.m., SECN+		at No. 23 Kentucky	L 76–90 ^{OT}		22 – Johnson	7 – Tied	5 – Vasko	Rupp Arena (18,958); Lexington, KY
Non-conference regular season
November 2, 2026*; 7:00 p.m., ESPN+		Florida Gulf Coast	W 96–95 ^{OT}	1—0	41 – Johnson	6 – A. Dean	4 – Vasko	Addition Financial Arena (5,054); Orlando, FL
November 6, 2026*; 7:00 p.m., ESPN+		Yale	W 87–75	2–0	28 – Johnson	7 – Johnson	5 – A. Dean	Addition Financial Arena (5,563); Orlando, FL
November 10, 2026*; 7:00 p.m., ESPN+		South Alabama	W 76–69	3–0	24 – Tied	8 – Abass	9 – Johnson	Addition Financial Arena (5,108); Orlando, FL
November 13, 2026*; 8:00 p.m., ESPN+		Georgia Southern	W 84–70	4–0	25 – Johnson	10 – Bol	6 – Kugel	Addition Financial Arena (5,532); Orlando, FL
November 17, 2026*; 7:00 p.m., ESPN+		Mississippi State	L 83–86	4–1	26 – Johnson	5 – Johnson	3 – Kugel	Addition Financial Arena (5,504); Orlando, FL
November 20, 2026*; 8:00 p.m., SECN+		at No. 15 Vanderbilt	L 74–82	4–2	30 – Johnson	7 – Johnson	6 – A. Dean	Memorial Gymnasium (8,142); Nashville, TN
November 26, 2026*; 1:30 p.m., ESPN2		vs. Boston College; ESPN Events Invitational Magic Group						State Farm Field House; Kissimmee, FL
November 27, 2026*; 7:00 p.m., ESPN2		vs. Georgia; ESPN Events Invitational Magic Group						State Farm Field House; Kissimmee, FL
December 1, 2026*; 7:00 p.m., ESPN+		Jacksonville						Addition Financial Arena; Orlando, FL
December 6, 2026*; 1:00 p.m., ESPN+		American						Addition Financial Arena; Orlando, FL
December 12, 2026*; TBA, FS1		at Indiana						Simon Skjodt Assembly Hall; Bloomington, IN
December 16, 2026*; 7:00 p.m., ESPN+		FIU						Addition Financial Arena; Orlando, FL
December 19, 2026*; TBA, ESPN+		vs. Virginia Tech						Rick Case Arena; Fort Lauderdale, FL
December 22, 2026*; 2:00 p.m., ESPN+		Towson						Addition Financial Arena; Orlando, FL
Big 12 regular season
January 2, 2027*; 4:00 p.m., ESPN+		Utah						Addition Financial Arena; Orlando, FL
January 6, 2027*; 9:00 p.m., Peacock		at Arizona						McKale Center; Tucson, AZ
January 9, 2027*; 4:00 p.m., ESPN+		at Arizona State						Desert Financial Arena; Tempe, AZ
January 13, 2027*; 8:00 p.m., Peacock		Baylor						Addition Financial Arena; Orlando, FL
January 16, 2027*; 2:00 p.m., FS1		at Kansas						Allen Fieldhouse; Lawrence, KS
January 19, 2027*; 7:00 p.m., ESPN+		Colorado						Addition Financial Arena; Orlando, FL
January 23, 2027*; 2:00 p.m., ESPN		Iowa State						Addition Financial Arena; Orlando, FL
January 30, 2027*; 4:00 p.m., ESPN		at Texas Tech						United Supermarkets Arena; Lubbock, TX
February 3, 2027*; 9:00 p.m., ESPNU		West Virginia						Addition Financial Arena; Orlando, FL
February 6, 2027*; 5:30 p.m., TNT		at Baylor						Foster Pavilion; Waco, TX
February 10, 2027*; 8:00 p.m., Peacock		Houston						Addition Financial Arena; Orlando, FL
February 13, 2027*; 2:00 p.m., ESPN+		at Cincinnati						Fifth Third Arena; Cincinnati, OH
February 16, 2027*; 6:00 p.m., TNT		at West Virginia						WVU Coliseum; Morgantown, WV
February 20, 2027*; 6:00 p.m., ESPN2/ESPNU		Texas Tech						Addition Financial Arena; Orlando, FL
February 24, 2027*; 8:30 p.m., CBSSN		at Oklahoma State						Gallagher-Iba Arena; Stillwater, OK
February 27, 2027*; 12:00 p.m., ESPN2		BYU						Addition Financial Arena; Orlando, FL
March 3, 2027*; 7:00 p.m., ESPN+		Kansas State						Addition Financial Arena; Orlando, FL
March 6, 2027*; 3:00 p.m., ESPNU		TCU						Schollmaier Arena; Fort Worth, TX
Big 12 tournament
March 9–13, 2027; TBD, ESPN+/ESPN		vs. TBD; First Round						T-Mobile Center; Kansas City, MO
*Non-conference game. ^{#}Rankings from AP poll. (#) Tournament seedings in parentheses. All times are in Eastern Time.

== Rankings ==
Ranking movements Legend: — = Not ranked
	Week																				
Poll	Pre	1	2	3	4	5	6	7	8	9	10	11	12	13	14	15	16	17	18	19	Final
AP	—	—	—																		
Coaches	—	—	—																		
