= 2026–27 Baylor Bears men's basketball team =

American college basketball season

2026–27 Baylor Bears men's basketball
- Conference: Big 12 Conference
- Record: 4–1 (0–0 Big 12)
- Head coach: Scott Drew (24th season)
- Associate head coach: Ron Sanchez (2nd season)
- Assistant coaches: Tweety Carter (3rd season); Jerome Tang (1st season); Jake Lindsey (1st season)
- Offensive scheme: Motion
- Base defense: No-Middle
- Home arena: Foster Pavilion

2026–27 Big 12 men's basketball standings
	Conf.				Overall
Team	W		L	PCT	W		L	PCT
Arizona State	0	–	0	–	4	–	0	1.000
No. 21 BYU	0	–	0	–	4	–	0	1.000
No. 8 Houston	0	–	0	–	4	–	0	1.000
No. 11 Kansas	0	–	0	–	4	–	0	1.000
TCU	0	–	0	–	4	–	0	1.000
No. 9 Texas Tech	0	–	0	–	4	–	0	1.000
West Virginia	0	–	0	–	4	–	0	1.000
Baylor	0	–	0	–	4	–	1	.800
UCF	0	–	0	–	4	–	1	.800
No. 12 Arizona	0	–	0	–	3	–	1	.750
Cincinnati	0	–	0	–	3	–	1	.750
Iowa State	0	–	0	–	3	–	1	.750
Kansas State	0	–	0	–	3	–	1	.750
Oklahoma State	0	–	0	–	3	–	1	.750
Utah	0	–	0	–	3	–	1	.750
Colorado	0	–	0	–	2	–	2	.500
† 2027 Big 12 tournament winner As of November 18, 2026; Rankings from AP poll

The 2026–27 Baylor Bears men's basketball team represented Baylor University during the 2026–27 NCAA Division I men's basketball season, the Bears' 121st season. The Bears, members of the Big 12 Conference, played their home games at Foster Pavilion. They were led by 24th-year head coach Scott Drew.

== Previous season ==
The Bears finished the 2025–26 season 17–17, 6–12 in Big 12 play to finish in a tie for thirteenth place. They lost in the first round of the Big 12 tournament to Arizona State. They received an at-large bid to the College Basketball Crown, the first appearance in school history. They defeated Minnesota in their first round matchup, 67–48 and were defeated by Oklahoma in their second round game, 69–82.

== Offseason ==
=== Departures ===
Baylor Departures
Name	Number	Pos.	Height	Weight	Year	Hometown	Reason for Departure

=== Incoming transfers ===
Incoming Transfers
Name	Number	Pos.	Height	Weight	Year	Hometown	Previous School

=== Recruiting classes ===
==== 2026 recruiting class ====
College recruiting
Name	Hometown	School	Height	Weight	Commit date
			N/A	N/A	
Recruit ratings: No ratings found
Overall recruit ranking:
Note: In many cases, Scout, Rivals, 247Sports, On3, and ESPN may conflict in their listings of height and weight.; In these cases, the average was taken. ESPN grades are on a 100-point scale.; Sources: "Baylor 2026 Basketball Commitments". Rivals.; "2026 Baylor Bears Recruiting Class". ESPN.; "2026 Team Ranking". Rivals.

== Preseason ==
The Big 12 preseason coaches & media poll will be released in October 2026. All awards will be voted on by the league's 16 head coaches, who can not vote for their own team or players.

Big 12 Preseason Coaches Poll

	Big 12 Coaches	Points
1.	Arizona	220 (12)
2.	Houston	214 (4)
3.	Kansas	186
4.	Iowa State	181
5.	Texas Tech	180
6.	BYU	148
7.	TCU	137
T8.	Cincinnati	116
T8.	West Virginia	116
10.	Baylor	102
11.	Oklahoma State	98
12.	Arizona State	75
13.	UCF	55
T14.	Colorado	34
T14.	Kansas State	34
16.	Utah	24
Reference: (#) first-place votes

Big 12 Preseason Media Poll

	Big 12 Coaches
1.	Arizona
2.	Houston
3.	Kansas
4.	Texas Tech
5.	Iowa State
6.	BYU
7.	Baylor
8.	TCU
9.	Cincinnati
10.	West Virginia
11.	Oklahoma State
12.	Arizona State
13.	UCF
14.	Kansas State
15.	Colorado
16.	Utah

All-Big 12 Preseason First team

Player	School	Pos.	Yr.	Ht., Wt.	Hometown (Last School)
Ivan Kharchenkov	Arizona	F	So.	6'7", 230	Munich, Germany (Bayern Munich)
Motiejus Krivas	Arizona	C	Jr.	7'2", 260	Siauliai, Lithuania (BC Žalgiris)
Paulius Murauskas	Arizona State	F	Sr.	6'8", 235	Kaunas, Lithuania (St. Mary's)
Robert Wright III†	BYU	G	Jr.	6'1", 183	Wilmington, DE (Baylor)
Dedan Thomas Jr.	Houston	G	Sr.	6'1", 180	Las Vegas, NV (LSU)
Joseph Tugler	Houston	F	Sr.	6'8", 230	Houston, TX (Cypress Falls HS)
Tamin Lipsey	Iowa State	G	GS	6'1", 200	Ames, IA (Ames HS)
Tyran Stokes	Kansas	G	Fr.	6'7", 230	Louisville, KY (Rainer Beach HS)
Xavier Edmonds	TCU	F	Sr.	6'8", 252	Long Beach, CA (Salt Lake CC)
JT Toppin†	Texas Tech	F	Sr.	6'9", 230	Dallas, TX (New Mexico)
† denotes unanimous selection Reference:

- Player of the Year: Motiejus Krivas, Arizona
- Co-Newcomer of the Year: Paulius Murauskas, Arizona State
- Freshman of the Year: Tyran Stokes, Kansas

== Roster ==
2026–27 Baylor Bears men's basketball team
Players
Coaches

Pos.	#	Name	Height	Weight	Year	Previous school	Hometown
F	0	Elijah Williams	6 ft 6 in (1.98 m)	212 lb (96 kg)	Fr	TMI Episcopal (TX)	San Antonio, Texas
G	2	Brett Decker Jr.	6 ft 0 in (1.83 m)	202 lb (92 kg)	Jr	Liberty	Elizabethtown, KY
G	3	Drew Perry	5 ft 10 in (1.78 m)	162 lb (73 kg)	So	Lake Hill Prep	Dallas, Texas
G	4	Kayden Mingo	6 ft 1 in (1.85 m)	195 lb (88 kg)	So	Penn State	Farmingdale, New York
G	5	Dylan Mingo	6 ft 4 in (1.93 m)	185 lb (84 kg)	So	Long Island Lutheran	Farmingdale, New York
G	7	Andre Iguodala II	6 ft 7 in (2.01 m)	181 lb (82 kg)	So	Link Academy (MO)	Lafayette, California
G	10	Isaac Williams IV	6 ft 1 in (1.85 m)	192 lb (87 kg)	Jr	Texas A&M-Corpus Christi	Oklahoma City, Oklahoma
G	13	James Goodis	6 ft 0 in (1.83 m)	185 lb (84 kg)	Sr	Indiana	Winter Park, Florida
F	15	Evan Chatman	6 ft 7 in (2.01 m)	221 lb (100 kg)	Sr	UAB	Harker Heights, Texas
F	20	Maikcol Perez	6 ft 8 in (2.03 m)	230 lb (104 kg)	So	Orange1 Bassano	Bassano del Grappa, Italy
F	21	Juslin Bodo Bodo	6 ft 7 in (2.01 m)	210 lb (95 kg)	Sr	High Point	Yaoundé, Cameroon
C	22	Tegra Makabu	6 ft 9 in (2.06 m)	255 lb (116 kg)	Fr	Northside Christian School (FLA)	Democratic Republic of Congo
C	44	Caden Powell	6 ft 9 in (2.06 m)	224 lb (102 kg)	Sr	Rice	Waco, Texas
C	46	Mayo Soyoye	6 ft 10 in (2.08 m)	260 lb (118 kg)	So	Blair Academy (NJ)	Abuja, Nigeria

Head coach

- Scott Drew (Butler)

Assistant coach(es)

- Ron Sanchez (SUNY Oneonta)
- Jerome Tang (Charter Oak)
- Tweety Carter (Baylor)
- Jake Lindsey (Baylor)

Legend

- (C) Team captain
- (S) Suspended
- (I) Ineligible
- (W) Walk-on
- Injured
- Current redshirt

Roster
Last update: October 15, 2025

== Schedule and results ==
Date time, TV	Rank^{#}	Opponent^{#}	Result	Record	High points	High rebounds	High assists	Site (attendance) city, state
Exhibition
August 7, 2026*; 3:00 p.m., NA		vs. Concordia Stingers	W 122–55		23 – I. Williams IV	11 – Powell	7 – I. Williams IV	Auditorium du collège Champlain (NA); Saint-Lambert, QC
October 18, 2026*; 1:00 p.m., SECN		vs. Florida	W 82–76 ^{OT}		31 – K. Mingo	8 – Tied	4 – K. Mingo	VyStar Veterans Memorial Arena (5,541); Jacksonville, FL
October 23, 2026*; 7:00 p.m., B1G+		at No. 3 Illinois	W 95–91		28 – Williams IV	10 – Bodo Bodo	8 – D. Mingo	State Farm Center (15,544); Champaign, IL
Regular season
November 2, 2026*; 8:30 p.m., ESPN+		Northwestern State	W 87–65	1–0	17 – Tied	7 – Tied	6 – D. Mingo	Foster Pavilion (5,022); Waco, TX
November 6, 2026*; 4:00 p.m., ESPN+		Arkansas–Pine Bluff	W 109–58	2–0	26 – I. Williams IV	5 – Tied	6 – I. Williams IV	Foster Pavilion (5,491); Waco, TX
November 10, 2026*; 7:00 p.m., ESPN+		Yale	W 90–61	3–0	18 – Decker	6 – Tied	5 – I. Williams IV	Foster Pavilion (5,334); Waco, TX
November 15, 2026*; 2:00 p.m., ESPN		vs. No. 7 Texas; San Antonio Hoops Showdown	L 72–75	3–1	23 – K. Mingo	7 – K. Mingo	6 – K. Mingo	Frost Bank Center (6,164); San Antonio, TX
November 18, 2026*; 11:00 a.m., ESPN+		Jackson State	W 104–55	4–1	35 – Decker Jr.	7 – E. Williams	8 – I. Williams IV	Foster Pavilion (4,487); Waco, TX
November 24, 2026*; 9:00 p.m., ESPN		vs. Alabama; Players Era 16 Bracket 2 First Round						T-Mobile Arena; Las Vegas, NV
November 26, 2026*; TBD, ESPN		vs. Gonzaga/Kansas State; Players Era 16						T-Mobile Arena; Las Vegas, NV
November 27, 2026*; TBD, ESPN		vs. TBD; Players Era 16 Semifinal						T-Mobile Arena; Las Vegas, NV
November 28, 2026*; 9:30 p.m., ESPN		vs. TBD; Players Era 16						Michelob Ultra Arena; Las Vegas, NV
December 5, 2026*; 11:00 a.m., ESPN2		Memphis						Foster Pavilion; Waco, TX
December 9, 2026*; 7:00 p.m., ESPN+		Queens						Foster Pavilion; Waco, TX
December 19, 2026*; 9:00 p.m., FS1		vs. Washington; Seattle Holiday Classic						Climate Pledge Arena; Seattle, WA
December 21, 2026*; 2:00 p.m., ESPN+		College of the Ozarks						Foster Pavilion; Waco, TX
December 29, 2026*; 6:00 p.m., ESPN+		Mississippi Valley State						Foster Pavilion; Waco, TX
January 2, 2027; 11:00 a.m., ESPN/2		Kansas State						Foster Pavilion; Waco, TX
January 6, 2027; 7:00 p.m., Peacock		at Texas Tech						United Supermarkets Arena; Lubbock, TX
January 10, 2027; 4:00 p.m., ESPN/ESPN2		Houston						Foster Pavilion; Waco, TX
January 13, 2027; 7:00 p.m., Peacock		at UCF						Addition Financial Arena; Orlando, FL
January 16, 2027; 1:00 p.m., ESPN2/ESPNU		Oklahoma State						Foster Pavilion; Waco, TX
January 19, 2027; 8:30 p.m., TruTV		at TCU						Schollmaier Arena; Fort Worth, TX
January 23, 2027*; TBD		vs. Louisville						Hinkle Fieldhouse; Indianapolis, IN
January 27, 2027; 7:00 p.m., CBSSN		Colorado						Foster Pavilion; Waco, TX
January 30, 2027; 9:00 p.m., TNT		at Utah						Jon M. Huntsman Center; Salt Lake City, UT
February 2, 2027; 7:00 p.m., FS1		at BYU						Marriott Center; Provo, UT
February 6, 2027; 4:30 p.m., TNT/TruTV		UCF						Foster Pavilion; Waco, TX
February 9, 2027; 8:00 p.m., TNT/TruTV		Cincinnati						Foster Pavilion; Waco, TX
February 13, 2027; 2:00 p.m., ESPN+		at Colorado						CU Events Center; Boulder, CO
February 17, 2027; 8:00 p.m., Peacock		at Kansas						Allen Fieldhouse; Lawrence, KS
February 20, 2027; 6:00/6:30 p.m., ESPN2/ESPNU		West Virginia						Foster Pavilion; Waco, TX
February 23, 2027; 8:00 p.m., ESPN/ESPN2		Iowa State						Foster Pavilion; Waco, TX
February 27, 2027; 1:00 p.m., CBS		at Arizona						McKale Center; Tucson, AZ
March 2, 2027; 9:30 p.m., FS1		at Arizona State						Desert Financial Arena; Tempe, AZ
March 6, 2027; 12:30 p.m., CBS		Kansas						Foster Pavilion; Waco, TX
Big 12 tournament
March 9–13, 2027; TBD, ESPN+/ESPN		vs. TBD; First Round						T-Mobile Center; Kansas City, MO
*Non-conference game. ^{#}Rankings from AP poll. (#) Tournament seedings in parentheses. All times are in Central Time.

== Rankings ==
Ranking movements Legend: ██ Increase in ranking ██ Decrease in ranking — = Not ranked RV = Received votes
	Week																				
Poll	Pre	1	2	3	4	5	6	7	8	9	10	11	12	13	14	15	16	17	18	19	Final
AP	—	RV	RV																		
Coaches	—	RV	RV																		
