= 2026–27 West Virginia Mountaineers men's basketball team =

American college basketball season

2026–27 West Virginia Mountaineers men's basketball
- Conference: Big 12 Conference
- Record: 4–2 (0–0 Big 12)
- Head coach: Ross Hodge (2nd season)
- Assistant coaches: Yusuf Ali; Johnny Estelle; Phil Forte; Jase Herl; Andre Shaw
- Home arena: Hope Coliseum

2026–27 Big 12 men's basketball standings
	Conf.				Overall
Team	W		L	PCT	W		L	PCT
No. 8 Houston	0	–	0	–	6	–	0	1.000
Arizona State	0	–	0	–	5	–	0	1.000
No. 21 BYU	0	–	0	–	5	–	0	1.000
No. 9 Texas Tech	0	–	0	–	5	–	0	1.000
No. 11 Kansas	0	–	0	–	5	–	1	.833
No. 12 Arizona	0	–	0	–	4	–	1	.800
Baylor	0	–	0	–	4	–	1	.800
Cincinnati	0	–	0	–	4	–	1	.800
TCU	0	–	0	–	4	–	1	.800
Iowa State	0	–	0	–	3	–	1	.750
West Virginia	0	–	0	–	4	–	2	.667
UCF	0	–	0	–	4	–	2	.667
Kansas State	0	–	0	–	3	–	2	.600
Oklahoma State	0	–	0	–	3	–	2	.600
Utah	0	–	0	–	3	–	2	.600
Colorado	0	–	0	–	2	–	3	.400
† 2027 Big 12 tournament winner As of November 22, 2026; Rankings from AP poll

The 2026–27 West Virginia Mountaineers men's basketball team will represent West Virginia University during the 2026–27 NCAA Division I men's basketball season. The Mountaineers are coached by second year head coach Ross Hodge, and play their home games at the Hope Coliseum located in Morgantown, West Virginia as members of the Big 12 Conference.

== Previous season ==
The Mountaineers finished the 2025–26 season 21–14, 9–9 in Big 12 Play to finish in a tie for seventh place. They lost in the second round of the Big 12 tournament to BYU, 48−68. They were one of eight teams invited to play in the 2026 College Basketball Crown. They defeated Stanford, 82−77 in overtime in their quarterfinal matchup. In the semifinals, West Virginia defeated Creighton 87−70 to reach the championship game. West Virgina defeated former Big 12 opponent Oklahoma, 89−82 in overtime to win their first College Basketball Crown Championship.

=== Departures ===
Name	Pos.	Number	Height	Weight	Hometown	Reason for Leaving
Treysen Eaglestaff	G	52	6' 6"	205 lbs	Bismarck, North Dakota	Transferred to UC San Diego
Jackson Fields	F	15	6' 8"	225 lbs	Missouri City, Texas	Transferred to Georgia Tech
Jayden Forsythe	G	4	6' 5"	195 lbs	Brooklyn, NY	Transferred to William & Mary
DJ Thomas	F	5	6' 7"	210 lbs	Allen, Texas	Transferred to TCU
Morris Ugusuk	G	23	6' 4"	170	Helsinki, Finland	Transferred to Stony Brook
Abraham Oyeadier	C	8	6' 9"	225 lbs	Ocala, Florida	Entered Transfer Portal
Niyol Hauet	G	21	6' 4"	180 lbs	Yokohama, Japan	Entered Transfer Portal
Jasper Floyd	G	1	6' 3"	195 lbs	Tampa, Florida	Entered Transfer Portal
Honor Huff	G	3	5' 10"	165 lbs	Brooklyn, NY	Entered Transfer Portal

=== Incoming transfers ===
Name	Number	Pos.	Height	Weight	Year	Hometown	Previous School
Joson Sanon	3	SG	6' 5"	200 lbs	Jr.	Fall River, Massachusetts	St. John's
Seydou Traore	7	G/F	6' 6"	220 lbs	Sr.	The Bronx, NY	Utah Utes
Martin Somerville	6	G	6' 3"	185 lbs	Jr.	Bowie, Maryland	Florida State
Mouhammed Sylla	14	C	6' 10"	230 lbs	So.	Louga, Senegal	Georgia Tech
Finley Bizjack	11	G	6' 4"	190 lbs	Sr.	Trophy Club, Texas	Butler
Javan Buchanan	22	F	6' 7"	230 lbs	Sr.	Lafayette, Indiana	Boise State

=== Recruiting classes ===
==== 2025 recruiting class ====
College recruiting
Name	Hometown	School	Height	Weight	Commit date
Miles Sadler; PG	Brampton, Ontario, Canada	Bella Vista Prep (AZ)	6 ft 0 in (1.83 m)	170 lb (77 kg)	Nov 16, 2025
Miles Sadler; PG	Recruit ratings: Rivals: 247Sports: ESPN: (91)				
Overall recruit ranking: 247Sports: 21 On3: 19 ESPN: 18
Note: In many cases, Scout, Rivals, 247Sports, On3, and ESPN may conflict in their listings of height and weight.; In these cases, the average was taken. ESPN grades are on a 100-point scale.; Sources: "2026 Team Ranking". Rivals.

== Preseason ==
The Big 12 preseason coaches & media poll will be released in October 2026. All awards will be voted on by the league's 16 head coaches, who can not vote for their own team or players.

Big 12 Preseason Coaches Poll

	Big 12 Coaches	Points
1.	Arizona	220 (12)
2.	Houston	214 (4)
3.	Kansas	186
4.	Iowa State	181
5.	Texas Tech	180
6.	BYU	148
7.	TCU	137
T8.	Cincinnati	116
T8.	West Virginia	116
10.	Baylor	102
11.	Oklahoma State	98
12.	Arizona State	75
13.	UCF	55
T14.	Colorado	34
T14.	Kansas State	34
16.	Utah	24
Reference: (#) first-place votes

Big 12 Preseason Media Poll

	Big 12 Coaches
1.	Arizona
2.	Houston
3.	Kansas
4.	Texas Tech
5.	Iowa State
6.	BYU
7.	Baylor
8.	TCU
9.	Cincinnati
10.	West Virginia
11.	Oklahoma State
12.	Arizona State
13.	UCF
14.	Kansas State
15.	Colorado
16.	Utah

All-Big 12 Preseason First team

Player	School	Pos.	Yr.	Ht., Wt.	Hometown (Last School)
Ivan Kharchenkov	Arizona	F	So.	6'7", 230	Munich, Germany (Bayern Munich)
Motiejus Krivas	Arizona	C	Jr.	7'2", 260	Siauliai, Lithuania (BC Žalgiris)
Paulius Murauskas	Arizona State	F	Sr.	6'8", 235	Kaunas, Lithuania (St. Mary's)
Robert Wright III†	BYU	G	Jr.	6'1", 183	Wilmington, DE (Baylor)
Dedan Thomas Jr.	Houston	G	Sr.	6'1", 180	Las Vegas, NV (LSU)
Joseph Tugler	Houston	F	Sr.	6'8", 230	Houston, TX (Cypress Falls HS)
Tamin Lipsey	Iowa State	G	GS	6'1", 200	Ames, IA (Ames HS)
Tyran Stokes	Kansas	G	Fr.	6'7", 230	Louisville, KY (Rainer Beach HS)
Xavier Edmonds	TCU	F	Sr.	6'8", 252	Long Beach, CA (Salt Lake CC)
JT Toppin†	Texas Tech	F	Sr.	6'9", 230	Dallas, TX (New Mexico)
† denotes unanimous selection Reference:

- Player of the Year: Motiejus Krivas, Arizona
- Co-Newcomer of the Year: Paulius Murauskas, Arizona State
- Freshman of the Year: Tyran Stokes, Kansas

== Roster ==
2026–27 West Virginia Mountaineers men's basketball team
Players
Coaches

Pos.	#	Name	Height	Weight	Year	Previous school	Hometown
F	0	Brenen Lorient	6 ft 9 in (2.06 m)	215 lb (98 kg)	Sr	North Texas	Ocala, FL
G	1	Miles Sadler	6 ft 0 in (1.83 m)	170 lb (77 kg)	Fr	Bella Vista Prep (AZ)	Brampton, Ontario
G	2	Amir Jenkins	6 ft 2 in (1.88 m)	180 lb (82 kg)	Fr	Worcester Academy	Worcester, MA
G	3	Joson Sanon	6 ft 5 in (1.96 m)	200 lb (91 kg)	Jr	St. John's	Fall River, MA
G	4	Keonte Greybear	6 ft 3 in (1.91 m)	185 lb (84 kg)	Fr	iSchool of Lewisville	Frisco, TX
C	5	Amadou Seini	7 ft 1 in (2.16 m)	250 lb (113 kg)	Fr	Bella Vista Prep (AZ)	Maroua, Cameroon
G	6	Martin Somerville	6 ft 3 in (1.91 m)	185 lb (84 kg)	Jr	Florida State	Bowie, MD
F	7	Seydou Traore	6 ft 6 in (1.98 m)	220 lb (100 kg)	Sr	Utah	Bronx, N.Y.
G	11	Finley Bizjack	6 ft 4 in (1.93 m)	190 lb (86 kg)	Sr	Butler	Trophy Club, TX
C	14	Mouhamed Sylla	6 ft 10 in (2.08 m)	210 lb (95 kg)	So	Georgia Tech	Louga, Senegal
G	20	MJ Feenane	6 ft 6 in (1.98 m)	190 lb (86 kg)	Fr	Christopher Columbus HS	Miami, FL
F	22	Javan Buchanan	6 ft 7 in (2.01 m)	230 lb (104 kg)	Sr	Boise State	Lafayette, Indiana
G	23	Jelani McKoy	6 ft 3 in (1.91 m)	180 lb (82 kg)	Fr	Bella Vista Prep (AZ)	Brampton, Ontario
F	24	Max Olejasz	6 ft 7 in (2.01 m)	190 lb (86 kg)	Fr	Wheeling Central High School	Wheeling, WV
C	85	Aliou Dioum	6 ft 10 in (2.08 m)	215 lb (98 kg)	Fr	Bella Vista Prep (AZ)	Dakar, Senegal

Head coach

- Ross Hodge (East Texas A&M)

Assistant coach(es)

- Yusuf Ali (Seneca College)
- Johnny Estelle (Texas A&M–Kingsville)
- Phil Forte (Oklahoma State)
- Jase Herl (Colorado Mesa)
- Andre Shaw (Western New England)

Legend

- (C) Team captain
- (S) Suspended
- (I) Ineligible
- (W) Walk-on
- Injured
- Current redshirt

Roster

== Schedule and results ==
Date time, TV	Rank^{#}	Opponent^{#}	Result	Record	High points	High rebounds	High assists	Site (attendance) city, state
Exhibition
October 18, 2026*; 3:00 p.m., B1G+		at Maryland	L 81–90 ^{OT}	–	25 – Bizjack	11 – Seini	4 – Sadler	Xfinity Center (10,047); College Park, MD
October 23, 2026*; 7:00 p.m., NA		at Glenville State	W 103–66	–	18 – Sadler	8 – Seini	6 – Sadler	Waco Center (NA); Glenville, WV
October 28, 2026*; 7:00 p.m., ESPN+		Wheeling	W 98–55	–	15 – Sadler	8 – Lorient	6 – Sadler	Hope Coliseum (8,437); Morgantown, WV
Non-conference regular season
November 2, 2026*; 7:00 p.m., ESPN+		Niagara	W 91–46	1–0	16 – Sadler	7 – Sylla	9 – Sadler	Hope Coliseum (9,024); Morgantown, WV
November 6, 2026*; 7:00 p.m., ESPN+		Stetson	W 91–53	2–0	25 – Sadler	8 – Seini	6 – Sadler	Hope Coliseum (9,081); Morgantown, WV
November 12, 2026*; 7:00 p.m., ESPN+		Mercer	W 75–61	3–0	15 – Bizjack	6 – Bizjack	6 – Sadler	Hope Coliseum (8,680); Morgantown, WV
November 17, 2026*; 11:59 p.m., ESPN		vs. Auburn; Players Era Festival 8 – First round	W 76–70	4–0	19 – Lorient	9 – Seini	6 – Sadler	Michelob Ultra Arena (5,144); Paradise, NV
November 18, 2026*; 7:30/10:00 p.m., ESPN2		vs. No. 11 Kansas; Players Era Festival 8 Semifinal	L 82–86	4–1	34 – Sadler	8 – Sylla	3 – Sadler	Michelob Ultra Arena (4,915); Paradise, NV
November 19, 2026*; 2:30 p.m., ESPN		vs. No. 1 Florida; Players Era Festival 8 3rd Place Game	L 72–85	4–2	18 – Sadler	6 – Sylla	2 – Tied	Michelob Ultra Arena; Paradise, NV
November 27, 2026*; 7:00 p.m., ESPN		vs. North Carolina; Dick Vitale Invitational						Spectrum Center; Charlotte, NC
December 1, 2026*; 7:00 p.m., ESPN+		Mercyhurst						Hope Coliseum; Morgantown, WV
December 5, 2026*; 4:30 p.m., FS1		Virginia Tech						Hope Coliseum; Morgantown, WV
December 9, 2026*; 6:00 p.m., ESPN2		vs. Pittsburgh; Backyard Brawl						PPG Paints Arena; Pittsburgh, PA
December 13, 2026*; 3:00 p.m., ESPN+		Coppin State						Hope Coliseum; Morgantown, WV
December 16, 2026*; 7:00 p.m., ESPN+		Northern Arizona						Hope Coliseum; Morgantown, WV
December 19, 2026*; 3:30 p.m., ESPN2		vs. Wake Forest; Holiday Hoopfest						First Horizon Coliseum; Greensboro, NC
December 21, 2026*; 7:00 p.m., ESPN+		South Carolina State						Hope Coliseum; Morgantown, WV
Big 12 regular season
January 2, 2027; 1:30 p.m., CBS		at Kansas						Allen Fieldhouse; Lawrence, KS
January 5, 2027; 6:00 p.m., CBSSN		Oklahoma State						Hope Coliseum; Morgantown, WV
January 9, 2027; 3:00 p.m., ESPN+		at Colorado						CU Events Center; Boulder, CO
January 12, 2027; 8:30 p.m., CBSSN		Kansas State						Hope Coliseum; Morgantown, WV
January 16, 2027; 12:00 p.m., Peacock		Cincinnati						Hope Coliseum; Morgantown, WV
January 20, 2027; 9:00 p.m., Peacock		at Utah						Jon M. Huntsman Center; Salt Lake City, UT
January 23, 2027; 2:00 p.m., FOX/FS1		at BYU						Marriott Center; Provo, UT
January 27, 2027; 8:30 p.m., FS1		Arizona State						Hope Coliseum; Morgantown, WV
January 30, 2027; 8;00 p.m., ESPN/ESPN2		Arizona						Hope Coliseum; Morgantown, WV
February 3, 2027; 9:00 p.m., ESPNU		at UCF						Addition Financial Arena; Orlando, FL
February 6, 2027; 12:45 p.m., CBS		Iowa State						Hope Coliseum; Morgantown, WV
February 13, 2027; 6:00 p.m., ESPN2		at Texas Tech						United Supermarkets Arena; Lubbock, TX
February 16, 2027; 7:00 p.m., TNT/TruTV		UCF						Hope Coliseum; Morgantown, WV
February 20, 2027; 6:00/6:30 p.m., ESPN2/ESPNU		at Baylor						Foster Pavilion; Waco, TX
February 24, 2027; 6:30 p.m., FS1		at Cincinnati						Fifth Third Arena; Cincinnati, OH
February 27, 2027; 12:00 p.m., CBS		Houston						Hope Coliseum; Morgantown, WV
March 3, 2027; 5:00 p.m., ESPN2		TCU						Hope Coliseum; Morgantown, WV
March 6, 2027; 2:00 p.m., FOX		at Iowa State						Hilton Coliseum; Ames, IA
Big 12 tournament
March 2027; ESPN+/ESPN		vs. First Round						T-Mobile Center; Kansas City, MO
*Non-conference game. ^{#}Rankings from AP Poll. (#) Tournament seedings in parentheses. All times are in Eastern Time.

== See also ==
- 2026–27 West Virginia Mountaineers women's basketball team
