= 2026–27 TCU Horned Frogs men's basketball team =

American college basketball season

2026–27 TCU Horned Frogs men's basketball
- Conference: Big 12 Conference
- Record: 4–1 (0–0 Big 12)
- Head coach: Jamie Dixon (11th season)
- Associate head coach: Tony Benford
- Assistant coaches: Duane Broussard; Jamie McNeilly; Jerry Hobbie; Michael Rice
- Home arena: Schollmaier Arena

2026–27 Big 12 men's basketball standings
| | Conf. | | | | Overall |
| Team | W | | L | PCT | W | | L | PCT |
|---|---|---|---|---|---|---|---|---|
| No. 8 Houston | 0 | – | 0 | – | 6 | – | 0 | 1.000 |
| Arizona State | 0 | – | 0 | – | 5 | – | 0 | 1.000 |
| No. 21 BYU | 0 | – | 0 | – | 5 | – | 0 | 1.000 |
| No. 9 Texas Tech | 0 | – | 0 | – | 5 | – | 0 | 1.000 |
| No. 11 Kansas | 0 | – | 0 | – | 5 | – | 1 | .833 |
| No. 12 Arizona | 0 | – | 0 | – | 4 | – | 1 | .800 |
| Baylor | 0 | – | 0 | – | 4 | – | 1 | .800 |
| Cincinnati | 0 | – | 0 | – | 4 | – | 1 | .800 |
| TCU | 0 | – | 0 | – | 4 | – | 1 | .800 |
| UCF | 0 | – | 0 | – | 4 | – | 1 | .800 |
| Iowa State | 0 | – | 0 | – | 3 | – | 1 | .750 |
| Kansas State | 0 | – | 0 | – | 3 | – | 1 | .750 |
| Oklahoma State | 0 | – | 0 | – | 3 | – | 1 | .750 |
| Utah | 0 | – | 0 | – | 3 | – | 1 | .750 |
| West Virginia | 0 | – | 0 | – | 4 | – | 2 | .667 |
| Colorado | 0 | – | 0 | – | 2 | – | 3 | .400 |
† 2027 Big 12 tournament winner As of November 20, 2026; Rankings from AP poll

The 2026–27 TCU Horned Frogs men's basketball team will represent Texas Christian University during the 2026–27 NCAA Division I men's basketball season. The Horned Frogs, led by eleventh-year head coach Jamie Dixon, play their home games at Schollmaier Arena located in Fort Worth, Texas as a member of the Big 12 Conference.

== Previous season ==
The Horned Frogs finished the 2025–26 season 23–12, 11–7 in Big 12 play to finish in sixth place. The Horned Frogs received the No. 6 seed in the Big 12 tournament, they defeated No. 14 seed Oklahoma State in their Second round matchup, 95–88. The Horned Frogs were defeated in the Quarterfinal matchup against No. 3 seed Kansas, 73–78.

The Horned Frogs received an at-large bids to the 2026 NCAA basketball tournament, where they received the No. 9 seed in the East Region. The Horned Frogs defeated No. 8 seed Ohio State 66–64 in their first round matchup. In the second round, the Horned Frogs were defeated 58–81 by No. 1 seed Duke, ending their season.

== Preseason ==
The Big 12 preseason coaches & media poll will be released in October 2026. All awards will be voted on by the league's 16 head coaches, who can not vote for their own team or players.

Big 12 Preseason Coaches Poll

| | Big 12 Coaches | Points |
| 1. | Arizona | 220 (12) |
| 2. | Houston | 214 (4) |
| 3. | Kansas | 186 |
| 4. | Iowa State | 181 |
| 5. | Texas Tech | 180 |
| 6. | BYU | 148 |
| 7. | TCU | 137 |
| T8. | Cincinnati | 116 |
| T8. | West Virginia | 116 |
| 10. | Baylor | 102 |
| 11. | Oklahoma State | 98 |
| 12. | Arizona State | 75 |
| 13. | UCF | 55 |
| T14. | Colorado | 34 |
| T14. | Kansas State | 34 |
| 16. | Utah | 24 |
Reference: (#) first-place votes

Big 12 Preseason Media Poll

| | Big 12 Coaches |
| 1. | Arizona |
| 2. | Houston |
| 3. | Kansas |
| 4. | Texas Tech |
| 5. | Iowa State |
| 6. | BYU |
| 7. | Baylor |
| 8. | TCU |
| 9. | Cincinnati |
| 10. | West Virginia |
| 11. | Oklahoma State |
| 12. | Arizona State |
| 13. | UCF |
| 14. | Kansas State |
| 15. | Colorado |
| 16. | Utah |

All-Big 12 Preseason First team

| Player | School | Pos. | Yr. | Ht., Wt. | Hometown (Last School) |
|---|---|---|---|---|---|
| Ivan Kharchenkov | Arizona | F | So. | 6'7", 230 | Munich, Germany (Bayern Munich) |
| Motiejus Krivas | Arizona | C | Jr. | 7'2", 260 | Siauliai, Lithuania (BC Žalgiris) |
| Paulius Murauskas | Arizona State | F | Sr. | 6'8", 235 | Kaunas, Lithuania (St. Mary's) |
| Robert Wright III† | BYU | G | Jr. | 6'1", 183 | Wilmington, DE (Baylor) |
| Dedan Thomas Jr. | Houston | G | Sr. | 6'1", 180 | Las Vegas, NV (LSU) |
| Joseph Tugler | Houston | F | Sr. | 6'8", 230 | Houston, TX (Cypress Falls HS) |
| Tamin Lipsey | Iowa State | G | GS | 6'1", 200 | Ames, IA (Ames HS) |
| Tyran Stokes | Kansas | G | Fr. | 6'7", 230 | Louisville, KY (Rainer Beach HS) |
| Xavier Edmonds | TCU | F | Sr. | 6'8", 252 | Long Beach, CA (Salt Lake CC) |
| JT Toppin† | Texas Tech | F | Sr. | 6'9", 230 | Dallas, TX (New Mexico) |
† denotes unanimous selection Reference:

- Player of the Year: Motiejus Krivas, Arizona
- Co-Newcomer of the Year: Paulius Murauskas, Arizona State
- Freshman of the Year: Tyran Stokes, Kansas

== Roster ==
2026–27 TCU Horned Frogs men's basketball team
Players
Coaches

| Pos. | # | Name | Height | Weight | Year | Previous school | Hometown |
|---|---|---|---|---|---|---|---|
| G | 0 | Trent Lincoln | 6 ft 3 in (1.91 m) | 190 lb (86 kg) | Jr | Gulf Coast State College | Baltimore, Maryland |
| G | 2 | Brock Harding | 6 ft 0 in (1.83 m) | 160 lb (73 kg) | Sr | Iowa | Moline, Illinois |
| G | 5 | Micah Robinson | 6 ft 6 in (1.98 m) | 230 lb (104 kg) | Jr | Oak Hill Academy | Kansas City, Missouri |
| G | 8 | Ricards Aizpurs | 6 ft 6 in (1.98 m) | 220 lb (100 kg) | Fr | Stella Azzurra Roma | Gulbene, Latvia |
| F | 9 | Luke Bamgboye | 6 ft 10 in (2.08 m) | 223 lb (101 kg) | Jr | Texas Tech | London, England |
| F | 10 | Miloš Šojić | 6 ft 10 in (2.08 m) | 244 lb (111 kg) | Fr | KK Beko | Belgrade, Serbia |
| G | 11 | Gavin Sykes | 6 ft 4 in (1.93 m) | 215 lb (98 kg) | So | Long Beach State | Sacramento, California |
| F | 15 | DJ Thomas | 6 ft 9 in (2.06 m) | 237 lb (108 kg) | So | West Virginia | Allen, Texas |
| C | 21 | Robbie Avila | 6 ft 10 in (2.08 m) | 240 lb (109 kg) | GS | Saint Louis | Oak Forest, Illinois |
| G | 22 | Jack Wegman | 6 ft 0 in (1.83 m) | 175 lb (79 kg) | Fr | Fort Worth Country Day School | Fort Worth, Texas |
| F | 23 | Sam Fleming | 6 ft 7 in (2.01 m) | 210 lb (95 kg) | Fr | Wilbraham & Monson Academy | Springfield, Massachusetts |
| F | 24 | Xavier Edmonds | 6 ft 8 in (2.03 m) | 252 lb (114 kg) | Sr | Salt Lake Community College | Long Beach, California |
| G | 30 | Drew McElroy (W) | 6 ft 2 in (1.88 m) | 178 lb (81 kg) | Sr | Highland Park High School | Dallas, Texas |
| F | 33 | Ryan Hunt | 7 ft 0 in (2.13 m) | 258 lb (117 kg) | Jr | Eastern Arizona College | Perth, Australia |
| G | 35 | Gavin Murphy | 5 ft 11 in (1.8 m) | 173 lb (78 kg) | Jr | State Fair Community College | Calabasas, California |
| G | 55 | Tanner Toolson | 6 ft 5 in (1.96 m) | 191 lb (87 kg) | Sr | Utah Valley | Vancouver, Washington |

Head coach

- Jamie Dixon (TCU)

Assistant coach(es)

- Tony Benford (Texas Tech)
- Duane Broussard (Bradley)
- Jamie McNeilly (LSU New Orleans)
- Jerry Hobbie (Fordham)
- Michael Rice (Franklin & Marshall)

Legend

- (C) Team captain
- (S) Suspended
- (I) Ineligible
- (W) Walk-on
- Injured
- Current redshirt

Roster
Last update: October 15, 2026

== Schedule and results ==
| Date time, TV | Rank^{#} | Opponent^{#} | Result | Record | High points | High rebounds | High assists | Site (attendance) city, state |
Costa Rica Foreign Tour
| August 1, 2026*; 9:00 p.m., NA | | vs. Ottawa | W 93–66 | 1–0 | 20 – Sykes | 7 – Thomas | 4 – Lincoln | Seminario (NA); San José, Costa Rica |
| August 2, 2026*; 5:00 p.m., NA | | vs. Ottawa | W 99–70 | 2–0 | 20 – Sykes | 9 – Thomas | 3 – Lincoln | Seminario (NA); San José, Costa Rica |
Exhibition
| October 17, 2026*; 1:00 p.m., TBA | | vs. Wyoming | W 89–76 | | 17 – Sykes | 9 – Edmonds | 3 – Harding | AI G. Langford Chaparral Center (NA); Midland, TX |
Non-conference regular season
| November 2, 2026*; 7:00 p.m., ESPN+ | | Lindenwood | W 98–59 | 1–0 | 19 – Thomas | 5 – Harding | 5 – Harding | Schollmaier Arena (4,647); Fort Worth, TX |
| November 6, 2026*; 7:00 p.m., ESPN+ | | Southern | W 106–54 | 2–0 | 18 – Robinson | 11 – Edmonds | 12 – Harding | Schollmaier Arena (4,633); Fort Worth, TX |
| November 10, 2026*; 8:00 p.m., ESPN+ | | Louisiana–Monroe | W 100–92 ^{2OT} | 3–0 | 27 – Robinson | 9 – Edmonds | 8 – Harding | Schollmaier Arena (4,521); Fort Worth, TX |
| November 13, 2026*; 7:00 p.m., ESPN+ | | Milwaukee | W 75–64 | 4–0 | 18 – Edmonds | 13 – Edmonds | 7 – Harding | Schollmaier Arena (4,765); Fort Worth, TX |
| November 19, 2026*; 7:00 p.m., Peacock | | Texas A&M | L 92–97 ^{OT} | 4–1 | 18 – Harding | 6 – Edmonds | 11 – Harding | Schollmaier Arena (7,066); Fort Worth, TX |
| November 24, 2026*; 2:00 p.m., ESPNU | | vs. Miami (FL); Players Era 16 Bracket 2 First Round | | | | | | T-Mobile Arena; Paradise, NV |
| November 26, 2026*; TBA, TBA | | vs. Creighton/Michigan; Players Era 16 Bracket 2 | | | | | | T-Mobile Arena; Paradise, NV |
| November 27, 2026*; TBA, TBA | | vs. Alabama/Baylor/Gonzaga/Kansas State; Players Era 16 Bracket 2 | | | | | | T-Mobile Arena; Paradise, NV |
| December 5, 2026*; 1:00 p.m., ESPNU | | at Notre Dame | | | | | | Purcell Pavilion; South Bend, IN |
| December 8, 2026*; 7:00 p.m., ESPN+ | | Alabama State | | | | | | Schollmaier Arena; Fort Worth, TX |
| December 12, 2026*; 3:30 p.m., ESPN2 | | Clemson | | | | | | Schollmaier Arena; Fort Worth, TX |
| December 19, 2026*; 4:00 p.m., ESPN+ | | Holy Cross | | | | | | Schollmaier Arena; Fort Worth, TX |
| December 22, 2026*; 7:00 p.m., ESPN+ | | Houston Christian | | | | | | Schollmaier Arena; Fort Worth, TX |
| December 29, 2026*; 7:00 p.m., ESPN+ | | Oral Roberts | | | | | | Schollmaier Arena; Fort Worth, TX |
Big 12 regular season
| January 2, 2027; 7:00 p.m., ESPN2 | | at Houston | | | | | | Fertitta Center; Houston, TX |
| January 5, 2027; 7:00 p.m., CBSSN | | Arizona State | | | | | | Schollmaier Arena; Fort Worth, TX |
| January 9, 2027; 1:00 p.m., TNT/TruTV | | Texas Tech | | | | | | Schollmaier Arena; Fort Worth, TX |
| January 12, 2027; 5:30 p.m., CBSSN | | at Cincinnati | | | | | | Fifth Third Arena; Cincinnati, OH |
| January 16, 2027; 7:00 p.m., CBSSN | | at Kansas State | | | | | | Bramlage Coliseum; Manhattan, KS |
| January 19, 2027; 8:30 p.m., TNT/TruTV | | Baylor | | | | | | Schollmaier Arena; Fort Worth, TX |
| January 23, 2027; 3:00 p.m., TNT/TruTV | | at Oklahoma State | | | | | | Gallagher-Iba Arena; Stillwater, OK |
| January 27, 2027; 7:00 p.m., ESPN2/ESPNU | | BYU | | | | | | Schollmaier Arena; Fort Worth, TX |
| January 30, 2027; 4:00 p.m., ESPN+ | | Colorado | | | | | | Schollmaier Arena; Fort Worth, TX |
| February 6, 2027; 8:00 p.m., CBSSN | | at Arizona State | | | | | | Desert Financial Arena; Tempe, AZ |
| February 8, 2027; 8:00 p.m., ESPN2 | | at Arizona | | | | | | McKale Center; Tucson, AZ |
| February 13, 2027; 7:30 p.m., CBSSN | | Oklahoma State | | | | | | Schollmaier Arena; Fort Worth, TX |
| February 16, 2027; 7:00 p.m., ESPN+ | | Utah | | | | | | Schollmaier Arena; Fort Worth, TX |
| February 20, 2027; 1:00 p.m., ESPN2 | | at BYU | | | | | | Marriott Center; Provo, UT |
| February 24, 2027; 8:00 p.m., ESPN/ESPN2/ESPNU | | Kansas | | | | | | Schollmaier Arena; Fort Worth, TX |
| February 27, 2027; 4:30 p.m., FOX | | at Iowa State | | | | | | Hilton Coliseum; Ames, IA |
| March 3, 2027; 4:00 p.m., ESPN2 | | at West Virginia | | | | | | WVU Coliseum; Morgantown, WV |
| March 6, 2027; 3:00 p.m., ESPNU | | UCF | | | | | | Schollmaier Arena; Fort Worth, TX |
Big 12 tournament
| March 9–13, 2027; TBD, ESPN+/ESPN | | vs. TBD; First Round | | | | | | T-Mobile Center; Kansas City, MO |
*Non-conference game. ^{#}Rankings from AP Poll. (#) Tournament seedings in parentheses. E=East. All times are in Central Time.

== Rankings ==
Ranking movements Legend: ██ Increase in ranking ██ Decrease in ranking — = Not ranked RV = Received votes
| | Week | | | | | | | | | | | | | | | | | | | | |
| Poll | Pre | 1 | 2 | 3 | 4 | 5 | 6 | 7 | 8 | 9 | 10 | 11 | 12 | 13 | 14 | 15 | 16 | 17 | 18 | 19 | Final |
|---|---|---|---|---|---|---|---|---|---|---|---|---|---|---|---|---|---|---|---|---|---|
| AP | RV | RV | RV | | | | | | | | | | | | | | | | | | |
| Coaches | — | — | RV | | | | | | | | | | | | | | | | | | |
