= 2027 Big 12 men's basketball tournament =

American college basketball competition

- Classification: Division I
- Season: 2026–27
- Teams: 16
- Site: T-Mobile Center; Kansas City, Missouri
- Television: ESPN, ESPN2, ESPNU, ESPN+

2026–27 Big 12 men's basketball standings
| | Conf. | | | | Overall |
| Team | W | | L | PCT | W | | L | PCT |
|---|---|---|---|---|---|---|---|---|
| Arizona | 0 | – | 0 | – | 0 | – | 0 | – |
| Arizona State | 0 | – | 0 | – | 0 | – | 0 | – |
| Baylor | 0 | – | 0 | – | 0 | – | 0 | – |
| BYU | 0 | – | 0 | – | 0 | – | 0 | – |
| Cincinnati | 0 | – | 0 | – | 0 | – | 0 | – |
| Colorado | 0 | – | 0 | – | 0 | – | 0 | – |
| Houston | 0 | – | 0 | – | 0 | – | 0 | – |
| Iowa State | 0 | – | 0 | – | 0 | – | 0 | – |
| Kansas | 0 | – | 0 | – | 0 | – | 0 | – |
| Kansas State | 0 | – | 0 | – | 0 | – | 0 | – |
| Oklahoma State | 0 | – | 0 | – | 0 | – | 0 | – |
| TCU | 0 | – | 0 | – | 0 | – | 0 | – |
| Texas Tech | 0 | – | 0 | – | 0 | – | 0 | – |
| UCF | 0 | – | 0 | – | 0 | – | 0 | – |
| Utah | 0 | – | 0 | – | 0 | – | 0 | – |
| West Virginia | 0 | – | 0 | – | 0 | – | 0 | – |
† 2027 Big 12 tournament winner Rankings from AP poll

The 2027 Big 12 Conference men's basketball tournament (branded as the 2026 Phillips 66 Big 12 Men's Basketball Tournament for sponsorship reasons) is a postseason men's basketball tournament for the Big 12 Conference. It will be played from March 9–14, 2027, in Kansas City, Missouri at the T-Mobile Center.

== Seeds ==
All sixteen teams are scheduled to participate in the tournament. The top eight teams will receive a first round bye and the top four teams will receive a double bye into the quarterfinals.

Teams will be seeded by record within the conference. Ties will be broken by head-to-head results, then results vs. the top seed in the conference and going down the standings until the tie is broken.

| Seed | School | Conference records | Tiebreak 1 | Tiebreak 2 |
|---|---|---|---|---|
| 1 | #‡ | – | | |
| 2 | ‡ | – | | |
| 3 | ‡ | – | | |
| 4 | ‡ | – | | |
| 5 | † | – | | |
| 6 | † | – | | |
| 7 | † | – | | |
| 8 | † | – | | |
| 9 | | – | | |
| 10 | | – | | |
| 11 | | – | | |
| 12 | | – | | |
| 13 | | – | | |
| 14 | | – | | |
| 15 | | – | | |
| 16 | | – | | |

Notes: # – Big 12 regular season champions, and tournament No. 1 seed
‡ – Received a double-bye into the conference tournament quarterfinal round
† – Received a single-bye into the conference tournament second round
Overall records include all games played in the 2026 Big 12 tournament.

== Schedule ==
| Game | Time* | Matchup^{#} | Final score | Television | Attendance |
First round – Tuesday, March 9
| 1 | 11:30 a.m. | No. 12 TBD vs No. 13 TBD | – | ESPN+ | |
| 2 | 2:00 p.m. | No. 9 TBD vs No. 16 TBD | – | ESPN+ | |
| 3 | 6:00 p.m. | No. 10 TBD vs No. 15 TBD | – | ESPN+ | |
| 4 | 8:30 p.m. | No. 11 TBD vs No. 14 TBD | – | ESPN+ | |
Second round – Wednesday, March 10
| 5 | 11:30 a.m. | No. 5 TBD vs TBD | – | ESPN | |
| 6 | 2:00 p.m. | No. 8 TBD vs TBD | – | ESPNU | |
| 7 | 6:00 p.m. | No. 7 TBD vs TBD | – | ESPN2 | |
| 8 | 8:30 p.m. | No. 6 TBD vs TBD | – | ESPNU | |
Quarterfinals – Thursday, March 11
| 9 | 11:30 a.m. | No. 4 TBD vs TBD | – | ESPN | |
| 10 | 2:00 p.m. | No. 1 TBD vs TBD | – | ESPN | |
| 11 | 6:00 p.m. | No. 2 TBD vs TBD | – | ESPN2 | |
| 12 | 8:30 p.m. | No. 3 TBD vs TBD | – | ESPN2 | |
Semifinals – Friday, March 12
| 13 | 6:00 p.m. | TBD vs TBD | – | ESPN | |
| 14 | 8:30 p.m. | TBD vs TBD | – | ESPN | |
Championship – Saturday, March 13
| 15 | 5:00 p.m. | TBD vs TBD | – | ESPN | |
*Game times in CDT. #-Rankings denote tournament seed.

== Bracket ==
First round Tuesday, March 9
9
16
12
13
10
15
11
14

Second round Wednesday, March 10
8
5
7
6

Quarterfinals; Thursday, March 11
1
4
2
3

Semifinals; Friday, March 12
5

Championship; Saturday, March 13

* denotes overtime period

== Awards and honors ==
=== Team and tournament leaders ===
| Team | Points | Rebounds | Assists | Steals | Blocks | Minutes |
| Arizona | | | | | | |
| Arizona State | | | | | | |
| Baylor | | | | | | |
| BYU | | | | | | |
| Cincinnati | | | | | | |
| Colorado | | | | | | |
| Houston | | | | | | |
| Iowa State | | | | | | |
| Kansas | | | | | | |
| Kansas State | | | | | | |
| Oklahoma State | | | | | | |
| TCU | | | | | | |
| Texas Tech | | | | | | |
| UCF | | | | | | |
| Utah | | | | | | |
| West Virginia | | | | | | |

=== All-Tournament Team ===
| Name | Pos. | Height | Weight | Year | Team |

=== Most Outstanding Player ===
| Name | Pos. | Height | Weight | Year | Team |
