= Natasha Barrett (television reporter) =

American journalist

Natasha Barrett is an American broadcast journalist. She was an anchor for KTRK-TV in Houston, TX. Natasha served as the weekend evening anchor and consumer reporter for four years. She is a Houston native, who graduated from Cypress Falls High School. She is the senior spokesperson for Memorial Hermann Health System.

== Career ==
Barrett spent eight years in Washington as the original host of the daily, one-hour talk show called Let's Talk Live. She co hosted the show with Doug McElway who appears now on Fox News. Barrett was also the consumer reporter at WJLA.

Barrett studied in London, England while attending American University in Washington. While in London, she worked for CNBC Europe. She graduated from American with a BA in Broadcast Journalism and Computer Information Systems.

She has worked at two stations in Texas: KZTV in Corpus Christi, followed by KCEN-TV in Waco. She joined WVEC-TV in Norfolk, Virginia, as an investigative reporter in 2003. Then, in 2006, she joined WJLA-TV in Washington, D.C., as a reporter.

Barrett received a Breaking News Award for her day-long coverage of a deadly church bus crash from the Texas Associated Press. She is also the recipient of an Investigative Reporting Award from the Virginia Associated Press for her work at WVEC-TV.

In 2007, she was nominated for the Hottest Female On-air in Washington.

Barrett was a news anchor for KTRK-TV in Houston. In November 2018, she was hired to be the strategic communications manager for the city of Baytown, Texas. She left the position in August 2019 to work as the senior spokesperson for Memorial Hermann Health System.
