= Keanu Dawes =

American basketball player (born 2005)

No. 8 – Kansas Jayhawks
- Position: Power forward
- Conference: Big 12 Conference

Personal information
- Born: April 4, 2005 (age 21)
- Listed height: 6 ft 10 in (2.08 m)
- Listed weight: 225 lb (102 kg)

Career information
- High school: Stratford (Houston, Texas)
- College: Rice (2023–2024); Utah (2024–2026); Kansas (2026–present)

Career highlights
- AAC All-Freshman Team (2024)

Keanu Dawes (born April 4, 2005) is an American college basketball player for the Kansas Jayhawks of the Big 12 Conference. He previously played for the Rice Owls and for the Utah Utes.

== Early life ==
Dawes attended Stratford High School in Houston, Texas. Coming out of high school, he was rated as a four-star recruit and the 103rd overall player in the class of 2024 by 247Sports, receiving offers from schools such as BYU, Oklahoma State, Texas, Texas A&M, Rice, and Utah. Ultimately, Dawes committed to play college basketball for the Rice Owls.

== College career ==
=== Rice ===
As a freshman in 2023–24, Dawes appeared in 32 games with 23 starts, averaging 6.6 points and 4.4 rebounds per game, earning all-AAC freshman honors. After the season, he entered the NCAA transfer portal.

=== Utah ===
Dawes transferred to play for the Utah Utes. On February 26, 2025, he recorded 18 points and 10 rebounds in a loss to Arizona. In the first round of the 2025 Big 12 men's basketball tournament, Dawes made his first start for the Utes, notching 21 points and 15 rebounds in a loss to UCF. He finished the 2024–25 season averaging 8.3 points and 6.4 rebounds per game. On December 20, 2025, Dawes totaled 21 points and nine rebounds in a victory against Eastern Washington. He averaged 12.5 points, 8.8 rebounds, and 2.2 assists per game on the season, after which he once again entered the NCAA transfer portal.

=== Kansas ===
Dawes transferred to play for the Kansas Jayhawks.
