= Tre White =

Tre White may refer to:

- Tre'Davious White (born 1995), American football cornerback
- Tre White (basketball) (born 2003), American basketball player
