= Cypress Falls High School =

Public secondary school in Harris County, Texas, United States

Location
- 9811 Huffmeister Road; Houston, TX 77095; United States; 29.9186°N 95.6316°W

Information
- Type: Public high school
- Motto: We Are One
- Established: 1992
- School district: Cypress-Fairbanks Independent School District
- Principal: Kyle Parsons
- Faculty: 206.68 (on an FTE basis)
- Grades: 9-12
- Enrollment: 2,989 (2023–2024)
- Student to teacher ratio: 14.46
- Colors: Green and gold
- Athletics: UIL 6A
- Athletics conference: University Interscholastic League
- Team name: Golden Eagles
- Accreditation: Blue Ribbon
- Website: cyfalls.cfisd.net

Cypress Falls High School is a secondary school in an unincorporated area of Harris County, Texas, United States. The current principal is Kyle Parsons. Cypress Falls is part of the Cypress Fairbanks Independent School District, which started during the late 19th century with a school named "The Cypress School". Originally, there were only 12 schools and it is now one of the largest districts in Houston, Texas.

The school's mascot is the golden eagle and their colors are green and gold.

Cypress Falls offers several different extracurricular resources to enhance the student and parent experience. The principal maintains a blog on the high school's website to help keep the parents connected and people informed in general.

== History ==
=== Opening of school and National Blue Ribbon ===
The school opened in 1992, becoming the fourth addition to the Cypress Fairbanks ISD high schools. George Hopper opened the school as the first principal on August 24, 1992. Cypress Falls was named a National Blue Ribbon School in 1999-2000.

=== Rezoning ===
Cypress Woods High School relieved Cypress Falls when it opened in fall 2006.

In 2016, as part of high school rezoning, a portion of Cypress Falls's attendance zone was reassigned to Cypress Ranch High School and another portion was reassigned to Langham Creek High School.

=== 2016 flood damage and Hurricane Harvey ===
This school and Cy-Fair High School were the two high schools in the district that had the most damage, and more importantly, out of all of the schools in the entire district, Cypress Falls faced the most damage during the April 2016 North American storm complex on April 18, 2016.

Three feet of water was standing in the school auditorium, which resulted to damage and removal of the floor. Two wooden gym floors had to be replaced as well. They also had to cut out some of the drywall and disinfect it.

In August 2017, the first day of school was postponed for students at Cypress Falls due to Hurricane Harvey. The school opened on September 11, 2017.

== Academics ==
For the 2018-2019 school year, the school received a B grade from the Texas Education Agency, with an overall score of 87 out of 100. The school received a B grade in each of the three performances domains, with a score of 89 for Student Achievement, 87 for School Progress, and 81 for Closing the Gaps. The school received three of the seven possible distinction designations for Academic Achievement in Mathematics, Academic Achievement in Social Studies, and Top 25%: Comparative Academic Growth.

== Demographics ==
The demographic breakdown of the 2,866 students enrolled for 2022-2023 was:

- African American: 20.5%
- Hispanic: 55.8%
- White: 12.6%
- Native American: 0.5%
- Asian: 7.3%
- Pacific Islander: 0.0%
- Two or More Races: 3.3%

64.0% of the students were eligible for free or reduced-cost lunch. For 2022-23, Cypress Falls was a Title I school.

== Feeder patterns ==
Schools that feed into Cypress Falls include:

- Elementary schools: Fiest, Horne, Owens, Birkes (partial), Hairgrove (partial), Lee (partial), Tipps (partial), Lamkin (partial)
- Middle schools: Labay, Truitt (partial), Spillane (partial)

== Extracurricular activities ==
During the school year of 2010-2011, Cypress Falls was the only school in its district to have all levels of its music department (band, orchestra, and choir) receive sweepstakes at their UIL Contest.

The Cypress Falls High School varsity men's choir performed at the Texas Music Educators Association (TMEA) 2012 Clinic and Convention on Feb. 10 at the Henry B. Gonzalez Convention Center in San Antonio. Selected from hundreds of submissions from across the state, the choir performed a concert before thousands of Texas music educators and students. Additionally, the Cypress Falls High School Varsity Women's choir performed at the Texas Music Educators Association (TMEA) 2015 Clinic and Convention at the Henry B. Gonzalez Convention Center in San Antonio in February 2015. Selected from hundreds of submissions from across the state, the choir performed a concert before thousands of Texas music educators and students. In addition to performing at TMEA, the Varsity Women's choir also performed at the National American Choral Directors Association (ACDA) 2015 Convention in Salt Lake City in February 2015, as they were selected from thousands of submissions from across the nation. This is the first choir chosen from the Cypress Fairbanks ISD to perform at the national level.

The Cypress Falls Golden Eagle Marching band 2015-2016 is the only Cypress-Fairbanks school to compete and place in finals in the Bands Of America Super Regional in Atlanta Georgia. They currently hold 22 consecutive UIL Sweepstakes and are active participants in the Texas UIL Marching Contest.

== Notable alumni ==
- Natasha Barrett, former news reporter and weekend evening news anchor for KTRK-TV
- Jaime Bubela, retired MLB outfielder
- Biren Ealy, former NFL wide receiver
- Clint Everts, former MLB pitcher, Sugar Land Skeeters
- Chris Francies, AFL wide receiver, Utah Blaze
- Chris Gbandi, soccer player, Miami FC
- Devin Gibson, collegiate basketball point guard, UTSA
- Kovid Gupta, screenwriter and author
- Scott Kazmir, MLB pitcher, Atlanta Braves
- Andrew Livingston, Olympic swimmer
- Gabe Muoneke, retired basketball player
- Ricky Price, former NFL safety
- Joseph Tugler, basketball player for the Houston Cougars
