= 2026–27 BYU Cougars men's basketball team =

American college basketball season

2026–27 BYU Cougars men's basketball
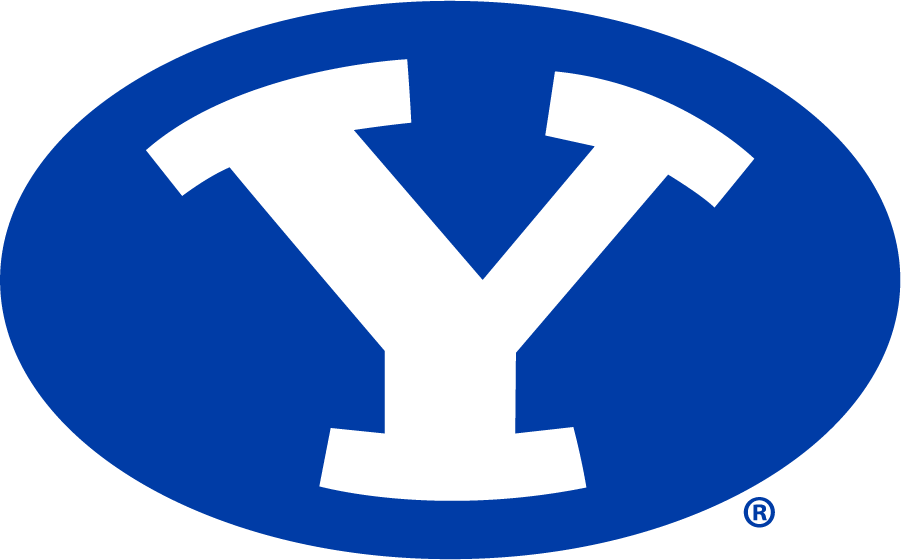
- Conference: Big 12 Conference

Ranking
- Coaches: No. 24
- AP: No. 21
- Record: 5–0 (0–0 Big 12)
- Head coach: Kevin Young (3rd season)
- Assistant coaches: Tim Fanning; Chris Burgess; Patrick Mutombo; Brandon Dunson; John Linehan
- Home arena: Marriott Center

2026–27 Big 12 men's basketball standings
	Conf.				Overall
Team	W		L	PCT	W		L	PCT
Arizona State	0	–	0	–	5	–	0	1.000
No. 21 BYU	0	–	0	–	5	–	0	1.000
No. 8 Houston	0	–	0	–	5	–	0	1.000
No. 11 Kansas	0	–	0	–	5	–	0	1.000
No. 9 Texas Tech	0	–	0	–	5	–	0	1.000
TCU	0	–	0	–	4	–	0	1.000
No. 12 Arizona	0	–	0	–	4	–	1	.800
Baylor	0	–	0	–	4	–	1	.800
Cincinnati	0	–	0	–	4	–	1	.800
UCF	0	–	0	–	4	–	1	.800
West Virginia	0	–	0	–	4	–	1	.800
Iowa State	0	–	0	–	3	–	1	.750
Kansas State	0	–	0	–	3	–	1	.750
Oklahoma State	0	–	0	–	3	–	1	.750
Utah	0	–	0	–	3	–	1	.750
Colorado	0	–	0	–	2	–	3	.400
† 2027 Big 12 tournament winner As of November 19, 2026; Rankings from AP poll

The 2026–27 BYU Cougars men's basketball team will represent Brigham Young University during the 2026–27 NCAA Division I men's basketball season. The Cougars will be led by third-year head coach Kevin Young and play their home games at Marriott Center in Provo, Utah as fourth-year members of the Big 12 Conference.

== Previous season ==
The Cougars finished the 2025–26 season 23–12, 9–9 in Big 12 play to finish in a tie for seventh place. As the No. 10 seed in the Big 12 tournament, they defeated Kansas State in the First round, defeated West Virginia in the second round before losing to Houston in the quarterfinals.

They received an at-large bid to the NCAA tournament as the No. 6 seed in the West region. The Cougars lost to Texas in the first round, 71−79.

== Offseason ==
=== Departures ===
Name	Number	Pos.	Height	Weight	Year	Hometown	Reason for departure
Abdullah Ahmed	34	C	6'10"	220	So.	Cairo, Egypt	Transferred to UMass
Mihailo Bošković	5	PF	6'10"	220	Jr.	Užice, Serbia	Out of Eligibility
Kennard Davis Jr.	30	SG	6'6"	215	Jr.	St. Louis, Missouri	Transferred to Missouri
Dominique Diomande	24	SF	6'7"	190	RS–Fr.	Paris, France	Transferred to Pitt
AJ Dybantsa	3	SF	6'9"	210	Fr.	Brockton, Massachusetts	Drafted by the Washington Wizards
Keba Keita	13	PF	6'8"	230	Sr.	Bamako, Mali	Out of Eligibility
Aleksej Kostic	6	SG	6'4"	200	Fr.	Pfaffstätten, Austria	Transferred to Northwestern
Jared McGregor	51	PG	6'3"	180	Sr.	Saratoga Springs, Utah	Out of Eligibility
Tyler Mrus	2	SF	6'7"	205	Jr.	Bothell, Washington	Transferred to The Citadel
KJ Perry	–	PG	6'3"	165	So.	Pacific Palisades, California	Transferred to Fresno State
Richie Saunders	15	SG	6'5"	200	Sr.	Riverton, Utah	Drafted by the Memphis Grizzlies
Xavion Staton	33	C	6'11"	210	Fr.	Las Vegas, Nevada	Transferred to Oregon State

=== Incoming transfers ===
Name	Pos.	Number	Height	Weight	Year	Hometown	Previous School
Tyler Betsey	PF		6'8"	225	Jr.	Windsor, CT	Syracuse
Collin Chandler	SG		6'4"	170	Jr.	Farmington, UT	Kentucky
Jaxon Kohler	PF		6'10"	245	Gr.	American Fork, UT	Michigan State
Jake Wahlin	PF		6'10"	210	Sr.	Provo, UT	Clemson

=== Recruiting classes ===
==== 2026 recruiting class ====
College recruiting
Name	Hometown	School	Height	Weight	Commit date
Bruce Branch III; SF	Fort Lauderdale, FL	Prolific Prep (FL)	6 ft 7 in (2.01 m)	190 lb (86 kg)	Mar 3, 2026
Bruce Branch III; SF	Recruit ratings: Scout: Rivals: 247Sports: ESPN: (94)				
Dean Rueckert; PF	Provo, UT	Timpview High School	6 ft 8 in (2.03 m)	180 lb (82 kg)	Nov 12, 2025
Dean Rueckert; PF	Recruit ratings: Scout: Rivals: 247Sports: ESPN: (83)				
Will Openshaw; PF	Provo, UT	Timpview High School	6 ft 10 in (2.08 m)	195 lb (88 kg)	Sep 23, 2025
Will Openshaw; PF	Recruit ratings: Scout: Rivals: 247Sports: ESPN: (NR)				
Overall recruit ranking: Scout: 34 Rivals: 34
Note: In many cases, Scout, Rivals, 247Sports, On3, and ESPN may conflict in their listings of height and weight.; In these cases, the average was taken. ESPN grades are on a 100-point scale.; Sources: "ESPN". ESPN.; "2026 Team Ranking". Rivals.

== Preseason ==
The Big 12 preseason coaches & media poll will be released in October 2026. All awards will be voted on by the league's 16 head coaches, who can not vote for their own team or players.

Big 12 Preseason Coaches Poll

	Big 12 Coaches	Points
1.	Arizona	220 (12)
2.	Houston	214 (4)
3.	Kansas	186
4.	Iowa State	181
5.	Texas Tech	180
6.	BYU	148
7.	TCU	137
T8.	Cincinnati	116
T8.	West Virginia	116
10.	Baylor	102
11.	Oklahoma State	98
12.	Arizona State	75
13.	UCF	55
T14.	Colorado	34
T14.	Kansas State	34
16.	Utah	24
Reference: (#) first-place votes

Big 12 Preseason Media Poll

	Big 12 Coaches
1.	Arizona
2.	Houston
3.	Kansas
4.	Texas Tech
5.	Iowa State
6.	BYU
7.	Baylor
8.	TCU
9.	Cincinnati
10.	West Virginia
11.	Oklahoma State
12.	Arizona State
13.	UCF
14.	Kansas State
15.	Colorado
16.	Utah

All-Big 12 Preseason First team

Player	School	Pos.	Yr.	Ht., Wt.	Hometown (Last School)
Ivan Kharchenkov	Arizona	F	So.	6'7", 230	Munich, Germany (Bayern Munich)
Motiejus Krivas	Arizona	C	Jr.	7'2", 260	Siauliai, Lithuania (BC Žalgiris)
Paulius Murauskas	Arizona State	F	Sr.	6'8", 235	Kaunas, Lithuania (St. Mary's)
Robert Wright III†	BYU	G	Jr.	6'1", 183	Wilmington, DE (Baylor)
Dedan Thomas Jr.	Houston	G	Sr.	6'1", 180	Las Vegas, NV (LSU)
Joseph Tugler	Houston	F	Sr.	6'8", 230	Houston, TX (Cypress Falls HS)
Tamin Lipsey	Iowa State	G	GS	6'1", 200	Ames, IA (Ames HS)
Tyran Stokes	Kansas	G	Fr.	6'7", 230	Louisville, KY (Rainer Beach HS)
Xavier Edmonds	TCU	F	Sr.	6'8", 252	Long Beach, CA (Salt Lake CC)
JT Toppin†	Texas Tech	F	Sr.	6'9", 230	Dallas, TX (New Mexico)
† denotes unanimous selection Reference:

- Player of the Year: Motiejus Krivas, Arizona
- Co-Newcomer of the Year: Paulius Murauskas, Arizona State
- Freshman of the Year: Tyran Stokes, Kansas

== Roster ==
2026–27 BYU Cougars men's basketball team
Players
Coaches

Pos.	#	Name	Height	Weight	Year	Previous school	Hometown
PF	0	Jaxon Kohler	6 ft 10 in (2.08 m)	245 lb (111 kg)	GS	Michigan State	American Fork, UT
G	1	Robert Wright III	6 ft 1 in (1.85 m)	183 lb (83 kg)	Jr	Baylor	Wilmington, DE
G	2	Nate Pickens	6 ft 3 in (1.91 m)	175 lb (79 kg)	GS	UC Riverside	El Mirage, AZ
SF	3	Bruce Branch III	6 ft 7 in (2.01 m)	190 lb (86 kg)	Fr	Prolific Prep (FL)	Fort Lauderdale, FL
F	4	Brody Kozlowski	6 ft 8 in (2.03 m)	210 lb (95 kg)	Jr	Corner Canyon HS	Draper, UT
G	5	Collin Chandler	6 ft 5 in (1.96 m)	205 lb (93 kg)	Jr	Kentucky	Farmington, UT
F	7	Khadim Mboup	6 ft 9 in (2.06 m)	215 lb (98 kg)	RS So	NBA Academy Africa	Dakar, Senegal
SF	8	Dean Rueckert	6 ft 8 in (2.03 m)	180 lb (82 kg)	Fr	Timpview HS	Provo, UT
F	9	Tyler Betsey	6 ft 8 in (2.03 m)	225 lb (102 kg)	Jr	Syracuse	Windsor, CT
F	10	Jake Wahlin	6 ft 10 in (2.08 m)	212 lb (96 kg)	Sr	Clemson	Provo, UT
C	12	Adam Stewart (W)	6 ft 11 in (2.11 m)	235 lb (107 kg)	Jr	Salt Lake Academy (UT)	Waller, TX
G	13	Brooks Bahr	6 ft 4 in (1.93 m)	180 lb (82 kg)	Fr	Keller HS	Keller, TX
F	24	Dovydas Buika	6 ft 7 in (2.01 m)	200 lb (91 kg)	Fr	Lietuvos krepšinio lyga (LIT)	Vilnius, Lithuania
G	25	Dawson Baker	6 ft 4 in (1.93 m)	190 lb (86 kg)	GS	UC Irvine	Coto de Caza, CA
C	33	Petar Ostojic	7 ft 1 in (2.16 m)	192 lb (87 kg)	RS Fr	KK Dynamic	Belgrade, Serbia

Head coach

- Kevin Young (Clayton State)

Assistant coach(es)

- Brandon Dunson (Arizona State)
- Chris Burgess (Utah)
- Tim Fanning (Whittier)
- John Linehan (Providence)

Legend

- (C) Team captain
- (S) Suspended
- (I) Ineligible
- (W) Walk-on
- Injured
- Current redshirt

Roster

== Schedule and results ==
Date time, TV	Rank^{#}	Opponent^{#}	Result	Record	High points	High rebounds	High assists	Site (attendance) city, state
Exhibition
October 16, 2026*; 7:00 p.m., ESPN+		Nebraska	W 72–61	–	18 – Tied	10 – Kohler	7 – Wright III	Marriott Center (15,864); Provo, UT
October 24, 2026*; 2:00 p.m., MW+	No. 25	at UNLV	W 89–77	–	23 – Chandler	5 – Tied	8 – Branch III	Thomas & Mack Center (5,319); Paradise, NV
Non-conference regular season
November 2, 2026*; 7:00 p.m., FS1	No. 25	vs. Ohio State; The Bad boy Mowers Series	W 94–83	1–0	33 – Wright III	6 – Betsey	5 – Wright III	Delta Center (10,422); Salt Lake City, UT
November 6, 2026*; 7:00 p.m., ESPN+	No. 25	Omaha	W 108–67	2–0	19 – Wright III	8 – Mboup	5 – Tied	Marriott Center (16,190); Provo, UT
November 10, 2026*; 7:00 p.m., ESPN+	No. 23	Queens (NC)	W 98–82	3–0	21 – Wright III	8 – Kohler	6 – Wright III	Marriott Center (16,963); Provo, UT
November 12, 2026*; 7:00 p.m., ESPN+	No. 23	Montana State	W 86–71	4–0	22 – Wright III	6 – Tied	7 – Wright III	Marriott Center (17,561); Provo, UT
November 18, 2026*; 7:00 p.m., ESPN+	No. 21	Northern Colorado	W 98–54	5–0	20 – Chandler	7 – Mboup	6 – Branch III	Marriott Center (17,245); Provo, UT
November 23, 2026*; 3:00 p.m., ESPN2		vs. Washington; Maui Invitational First round						Lahaina Civic Center; Lahaina, HI
November 24, 2026*; TBD, ESPN/ESPNU		vs. Clemson/Ole Miss; Maui Invitational						Lahaina Civic Center; Lahaina, HI
November 25, 2026*; TBD, ESPN/ESPN2		vs. Arizona/Colorado State/Providence/VCU; Maui Invitational						Lahaina Civic Center; Lahaina, HI
December 5, 2026*; 2:00 p.m., Peacock		vs. Northwestern						Delta Center; Salt Lake City, UT
December 9, 2026*; 8:00 p.m., FS1		Utah State; Rivalry						Marriott Center; Provo, UT
December 12, 2026*; 2:30 p.m., CBSSN		Cal State Fullerton						Marriott Center; Provo, UT
December 15, 2026*; 7:00 p.m., ESPN+		Weber State						Marriott Center; Provo, UT
December 19, 2026*; 8:00 p.m., USA		vs. San Diego State; Acrisure Series						Acrisure Arena; Thousand Palms, CA
December 22, 2026*; 7:00 p.m., ESPN+		La Salle						Marriott Center; Provo, UT
Big 12 regular season
January 2, 2027; 8:00 p.m., ESPN2		at Arizona State						Desert Financial Arena; Tempe, AZ
January 6, 2027; 8:30 p.m., FS1		Cincinnati						Marriott Center; Provo, UT
January 9, 2027; 11:00 a.m., ESPN		Kansas						Marriott Center; Provo, UT
January 12, 2027; 9:00 p.m., ESPN		at Arizona						McKale Center; Tucson, AZ
January 16, 2027; 8:00 p.m., TNT/TruTV		Utah; Rivalry						Marriott Center; Provo, UT
January 20, 2027; 7:00 p.m., FS1		at Iowa State						Hilton Coliseum; Ames, IA
January 23, 2027; 12:00 p.m., FOX/FS1		West Virginia						Marriott Center; Provo, UT
January 27, 2027; 5:00 p.m., ESPN2/ESPNU		at TCU						Schollmaier Arena; Fort Worth, TX
January 30, 2027; 12:00 p.m., ESPN/ESPN2		at Houston						Fertitta Center; Houston, TX
February 2, 2027; 6:00 p.m., FS1		Baylor						Marriott Center; Provo, UT
February 6, 2027; 7:30 p.m., ESPN2		Utah; Rivalry						Jon M. Huntsman Center; Salt Lake City, UT
February 13, 2027; 1:30 p.m., FOX		Kansas State						Marriott Center; Provo, UT
February 17, 2027; 7:00 p.m., Peacock		at Colorado						CU Events Center; Boulder, CO
February 20, 2027; 12:00 p.m., ESPN2		TCU						Marriott Center; Provo, UT
February 22, 2027; 7:00 p.m., ESPN		Arizona						Marriott Center; Provo, UT
February 27, 2027; 10:00 a.m., ESPN2		at UCF						Addition Financial Arena; Orlando, FL
March 2, 2027; 7:00 p.m., ESPN/ESPN2		Oklahoma State						Marriott Center; Provo, UT
March 5, 2027; 7:00 p.m., FS1		at Texas Tech						United Supermarkets Arena; Lubbock, TX
Big 12 tournament
March 9–14, 2027; TBD, TBD		vs. TBD; First round						T-Mobile Center; Kansas City, MO
*Non-conference game. ^{#}Rankings from AP Poll. (#) Tournament seedings in parentheses. All times are in Mountain Time.

== Rankings ==
Ranking movements Legend: ██ Increase in ranking ██ Decrease in ranking
	Week																				
Poll	Pre	1	2	3	4	5	6	7	8	9	10	11	12	13	14	15	16	17	18	19	Final
AP	25	23	21																		
Coaches	25	25	24																		
