= 2026–27 Kansas Jayhawks men's basketball team =

American college basketball season

2026–27 Kansas Jayhawks men's basketball
- Conference: Big 12 Conference

Ranking
- Coaches: No. 9
- AP: No. 11
- Record: 5–1 (0–0 Big 12)
- Head coach: Bill Self (24th season)
- Assistant coaches: Jeremy Case (6th season); Kurtis Townsend (23rd season); Joe Dooley (13th season); Jacque Vaughn (2nd season); Tony Bland (2nd season)
- Home arena: Allen Fieldhouse

2026–27 Big 12 men's basketball standings
	Conf.				Overall
Team	W		L	PCT	W		L	PCT
No. 8 Houston	0	–	0	–	6	–	0	1.000
Arizona State	0	–	0	–	5	–	0	1.000
No. 21 BYU	0	–	0	–	5	–	0	1.000
No. 9 Texas Tech	0	–	0	–	5	–	0	1.000
No. 11 Kansas	0	–	0	–	5	–	1	.833
No. 12 Arizona	0	–	0	–	4	–	1	.800
Baylor	0	–	0	–	4	–	1	.800
Cincinnati	0	–	0	–	4	–	1	.800
TCU	0	–	0	–	4	–	1	.800
Iowa State	0	–	0	–	3	–	1	.750
West Virginia	0	–	0	–	4	–	2	.667
UCF	0	–	0	–	4	–	2	.667
Kansas State	0	–	0	–	3	–	2	.600
Oklahoma State	0	–	0	–	3	–	2	.600
Utah	0	–	0	–	3	–	2	.600
Colorado	0	–	0	–	2	–	3	.400
† 2027 Big 12 tournament winner As of November 22, 2026; Rankings from AP poll

The 2026–27 Kansas Jayhawks men's basketball team will represent the University of Kansas in the 2026–27 NCAA Division I men's basketball season, the Jayhawks' 129th basketball season. The Jayhawks, members of the Big 12 Conference, will play their home games at Allen Fieldhouse in Lawrence, Kansas. They will be led by 24th year Hall of Fame head coach Bill Self.

== Previous season ==
The Jayhawks finished the 2025–26 season 24–11, 12–6 in Big 12 Conference play, tying for third in the Big 12 regular season standings. They were invited to their 53rd NCAA Tournament appearance, receiving a number 4 seed in the East Regional. They lost to number 5 seed St. John's in the second round.

== Offseason ==
=== Departures ===
Kansas Jayhawks departures
Name	Number	Pos.	Height	Weight	Year	Hometown	Reason
Corbin Allen	2	F	6'5"	175 lb	Fr.	Kansas City, MO	Transferred to Appalachian State
Flory Bidunga	40	F	6'10"	235 lb	So.	Kinshasa, Democratic Republic of the Congo	Transferred to Louisville
Samis Calderon	6	F	6'8"	200 lb	Fr.	Espírito Santo, Brazil	Transferred to Butler
Justin Cross	25	F	6'8"	200 lb	Sr.	Oak Park, IL	Out of eligibility
Jayden Dawson	1	G	6'5"	205 lb	Sr.	Omaha, NE	Out of eligibility
Wilder Evers	12	G	6'4"	195 lb	Sr.	Birmingham, AL	Out of eligibility
Elmarko Jackson	13	G	6'3"	195 lb	Jr.	Marlton, NJ	Transferred to Georgetown
Jamari McDowell	11	G	6'5"	200 lb	Jr.	Houston, TX	Transferred to Wake Forest
Nginyu Ngala	0	G	5'10"	175 lb	Sr.	Montreal, QB	Out of eligibility
Darryn Peterson	22	G	6'6"	205 lb	So.	Canton, CA	Declared for the 2026 NBA draft
Bryson Tiller	15	F	6'11"	240 lb	So.	Atlanta, GA	Transferred to Missouri

=== Acquisitions ===
==== Transfers ====
Kansas Jayhawks Transfers
Name	Number	Pos.	Height	Weight	Year	Hometown	Reason
Leroy Blyden Jr.	2	G	6'1"	170	So.	Detroit, MI	Transferred from Toledo
Keanu Dawes	8	F	6'9"	225	Sr.	Houston, TX	Transferred from Utah
Trey Kaufman-Renn	9	F	6'9"	240	RS-Sr.	Sellersburg, IN	Transferred from Purdue
Dennis Parker Jr.	11	G	6'6"	215	Sr.	Richmond, VA	Transferred from Radford
Christian Reeves	32	F	7'2"	255	RS-Sr.	Charlotte, NC	Transferred from Charleston

=== 2026 recruiting class ===
College recruiting
Name	Hometown	School	Height	Weight	Commit date
Tyran Stokes; SF	Louisville, KY	Rainier Beach	6 ft 7 in (2.01 m)	230 lb (100 kg)	Apr 28, 2026
Tyran Stokes; SF	Recruit ratings: 247Sports: On3: ESPN: (95)				
Taylen Kinney; PG	Newport, KY	Overtime Elite	6 ft 1 in (1.85 m)	185 lb (84 kg)	Sep 28, 2025
Taylen Kinney; PG	Recruit ratings: 247Sports: On3: ESPN: (90)				
Davion Adkins; PF	Arlington, TX	Prolific Prep	6 ft 8 in (2.03 m)	205 lb (93 kg)	Oct 5, 2025
Davion Adkins; PF	Recruit ratings: 247Sports: On3: ESPN: (85)				
Trent Perry; SF	Frisco, TX	Link Academy	6 ft 4 in (1.93 m)	175 lb (79 kg)	Oct 1, 2025
Trent Perry; SF	Recruit ratings: 247Sports: On3: ESPN: (83)				
Luke Barnett; SG	Santa Ana, CA	Mater Dei	6 ft 3 in (1.91 m)	170 lb (77 kg)	Oct 24, 2025
Luke Barnett; SG	Recruit ratings: 247Sports: On3: ESPN: (82)				
Grant Mordini; C	Lake Forest, IL	Avon Old Farms	6 ft 11 in (2.11 m)	210 lb (95 kg)	
Grant Mordini; C	Recruit ratings: 247Sports: On3: ESPN: (NA)				
Atticus Richmond; SF	Boston, MA	The Newman School	6 ft 8 in (2.03 m)	225 lb (102 kg)	May 9, 2026
Atticus Richmond; SF	Recruit ratings: 247Sports: On3: ESPN: (NA)				
Overall recruiting rankings: 247 Sports: 4 On3: 5 ESPN: 3

== Preseason ==
The Big 12 preseason coaches & media poll will be released in October 2026. All awards will be voted on by the league's 16 head coaches, who can not vote for their own team or players.

Big 12 Preseason Coaches Poll

	Big 12 Coaches	Points
1.	Arizona	220 (12)
2.	Houston	214 (4)
3.	Kansas	186
4.	Iowa State	181
5.	Texas Tech	180
6.	BYU	148
7.	TCU	137
T8.	Cincinnati	116
T8.	West Virginia	116
10.	Baylor	102
11.	Oklahoma State	98
12.	Arizona State	75
13.	UCF	55
T14.	Colorado	34
T14.	Kansas State	34
16.	Utah	24
Reference: (#) first-place votes

Big 12 Preseason Media Poll

	Big 12 Coaches
1.	Arizona
2.	Houston
3.	Kansas
4.	Texas Tech
5.	Iowa State
6.	BYU
7.	Baylor
8.	TCU
9.	Cincinnati
10.	West Virginia
11.	Oklahoma State
12.	Arizona State
13.	UCF
14.	Kansas State
15.	Colorado
16.	Utah

All-Big 12 Preseason First team

Player	School	Pos.	Yr.	Ht., Wt.	Hometown (Last School)
Ivan Kharchenkov	Arizona	F	So.	6'7", 230	Munich, Germany (Bayern Munich)
Motiejus Krivas	Arizona	C	Jr.	7'2", 260	Siauliai, Lithuania (BC Žalgiris)
Paulius Murauskas	Arizona State	F	Sr.	6'8", 235	Kaunas, Lithuania (St. Mary's)
Robert Wright III†	BYU	G	Jr.	6'1", 183	Wilmington, DE (Baylor)
Dedan Thomas Jr.	Houston	G	Sr.	6'1", 180	Las Vegas, NV (LSU)
Joseph Tugler	Houston	F	Sr.	6'8", 230	Houston, TX (Cypress Falls HS)
Tamin Lipsey	Iowa State	G	GS	6'1", 200	Ames, IA (Ames HS)
Tyran Stokes	Kansas	G	Fr.	6'7", 230	Louisville, KY (Rainer Beach HS)
Xavier Edmonds	TCU	F	Sr.	6'8", 252	Long Beach, CA (Salt Lake CC)
JT Toppin†	Texas Tech	F	Sr.	6'9", 230	Dallas, TX (New Mexico)
† denotes unanimous selection Reference:

- Player of the Year: Motiejus Krivas, Arizona
- Co-Newcomer of the Year: Paulius Murauskas, Arizona State
- Freshman of the Year: Tyran Stokes, Kansas

=== Award watch lists ===
Listed in the order that they were released

Award	Player	Position	Year	Source

== Personnel ==
=== Roster ===
Roster below is based on the 2026–27 roster with outgoing players removed and incoming players added. The roster will undergo multiple changes as players leave via the NBA draft or transfers and players are added via the transfer portal and recruiting.

2026–27 Kansas Jayhawks men's basketball team
Players
Coaches

Pos.	#	Name	Height	Weight	Year	Previous school	Hometown
G	0	Taylen Kinney	6 ft 2 in (1.88 m)	185 lb (84 kg)	Fr	Overtime Elite (GA)	Newport, KY
G	1	Luke Barnett	6 ft 4 in (1.93 m)	195 lb (88 kg)	Fr	Mater Dei HS (CA)	Laguna Niguel, CA
G	2	Leroy Blyden Jr.	6 ft 1 in (1.85 m)	170 lb (77 kg)	So	Toledo	Detroit, MI
G	3	Tre White	6 ft 7 in (2.01 m)	215 lb (98 kg)	Sr	Illinois	Dallas, TX
G	4	Tyran Stokes	6 ft 7 in (2.01 m)	230 lb (104 kg)	Fr	Rainier Beach HS (WA)	Louisville, KY
F	5	Grant Mordini	6 ft 11 in (2.11 m)	210 lb (95 kg)	Fr	Avon Old Farms School (CT)	Lake Forest, IL
F	6	Atticus Richmond	6 ft 8 in (2.03 m)	235 lb (107 kg)	Fr	Newman School (MA)	Lincolnshire, IL
G	7	Kohl Rosario	6 ft 6 in (1.98 m)	200 lb (91 kg)	So	Overtime Elite (GA)	Miami, FL
F	8	Keanu Dawes	6 ft 9 in (2.06 m)	225 lb (102 kg)	Sr	Utah	Houston, TX
F	9	Trey Kaufman-Renn	6 ft 9 in (2.06 m)	240 lb (109 kg)	RS Sr	Purdue	Sellersburg, IN
G	11	Dennis Parker Jr.	6 ft 6 in (1.98 m)	215 lb (98 kg)	Sr	Radford	Richmond, VA
G	14	Melvin Council Jr.	6 ft 4 in (1.93 m)	180 lb (82 kg)	Sr	St. Bonaventure	Rochester, NY
G	21	Will Thengvall (W)	6 ft 4 in (1.93 m)	190 lb (86 kg)	Jr	Kapaun Mt. Carmel Catholic (KS)	Wichita, KS
G	23	Trent Perry	6 ft 5 in (1.96 m)	190 lb (86 kg)	Fr	Link Academy (MO)	Frisco, TX
F	25	Davion Adkins	6 ft 9 in (2.06 m)	205 lb (93 kg)	Fr	Prolific Prep (FL)	Arlington, TX
C	32	Christian Reeves	7 ft 2 in (2.18 m)	255 lb (116 kg)	RS Sr	Charleston	Charlotte, NC
C	34	Paul Mbiya	7 ft 0 in (2.13 m)	245 lb (111 kg)	So	ASVEL	Kinshasa, DRC

Head coach

- Bill Self (Oklahoma State)

Assistant coach(es)

- Jacque Vaughn (Kansas)
- Kurtis Townsend (Western Kentucky)
- Jeremy Case (Kansas)
- Joe Dooley (George Washington)
- Tony Bland (San Diego State)

Legend

- (C) Team captain
- (S) Suspended
- (I) Ineligible
- (W) Walk-on
- Injured
- Current redshirt

Roster

Note: Players' year is based on remaining eligibility.

== Schedule and results ==
Date time, TV	Rank^{#}	Opponent^{#}	Result	Record	High points	High rebounds	High assists	Site (attendance) city, state
Exhibition
October 16, 2026*; 7:00 p.m., ESPN+		Pittsburg State	W 80–62	–	16 – White	10 – Reeves	3 – Tied	Allen Fieldhouse (15,200); Lawrence, KS
October 21, 2026*; 6:00 p.m., ESPNU	No. 17	No. 11 Louisville	L 83–89	–	25 – White	9 – Stokes	6 – Kinney	Allen Fieldhouse (15,300); Lawrence, KS
October 25, 2026*; 12:00 p.m., ESPN	No. 17	No. 2 Duke	L 84–90	–	27 – Stokes	8 – Stokes	7 – Stokes	Allen Fieldhouse (15,300); Lawrence, KS
Non-conference regular season
November 2, 2026*; 7:00 p.m., ESPN+	No. 17	Fordham	W 95–65	1–0	22 – White	9 – Dawes	7 – Council	Allen Fieldhouse (15,300); Lawrence, KS
November 6, 2026*; 8:00 p.m., ESPNU	No. 17	Middle Tennessee	W 89–45	2–0	17 – Kaufman-Renn	8 – Dawes	3 – Tied	Allen Fieldhouse (15,300); Lawrence, KS
November 10, 2026*; 8:30 p.m., ESPN	No. 15	vs. No. 24 Kentucky; Champions Classic	W 89–69	3–0	30 – White	10 – Stokes	8 – Kinney	United Center (18,891); Chicago, IL
November 17, 2026*; 8:30 p.m., ESPN	No. 11	vs. UNLV; Players Era 8 First round	W 102–77	4–0	23 – Blyden	10 – Stokes	6 – Blyden	Michelob Ultra Arena (5,144); Las Vegas, NV
November 18, 2026*; 6:30 p.m., ESPN2	No. 11	vs. West Virginia; Players Era 8 Semifinal	W 86–82	5–0	21 – White	12 – Dawes	4 – Blyden	Michelob Ultra Arena (4,915); Las Vegas, NV
November 19, 2026*; 10:00 p.m., ESPN	No. 11	vs. No. 8 Houston; Players Era 8 Championship Game	L 83–92	5–1	22 – Stokes	11 – Stokes	4 – Tied	Michelob Ultra Arena (5,020); Las Vegas, NV
November 23, 2026*; 7:00 p.m., ESPN+		Denver						Allen Fieldhouse; Lawrence, KS
November 27, 2026*; 4:00 p.m., ESPN2		Villanova						Allen Fieldhouse; Lawrence, KS
December 1, 2026*; 7:00 p.m., ESPN+		Northern Iowa						Allen Fieldhouse; Lawrence, KS
December 6, 2026*; 4:00 p.m., ESPN		vs. Missouri; Border War						T-Mobile Center; Kansas City, MO
December 12, 2026*; 7:00 p.m., FOX		at UConn						Harry A. Gampel Pavilion; Storrs, CT
December 19, 2026*; 11:00 a.m., CBS		vs. Ohio State; CBS Sports Classic						Madison Square Garden; New York, NY
December 22, 2026*; 5:00 p.m., ESPN2		Indiana State						Allen Fieldhouse; Lawrence, KS
December 29, 2026*; 7:00 p.m., ESPN2		LSU New Orleans						Allen Fieldhouse; Lawrence, KS
Big 12 regular season
January 2, 2027; 12:30 p.m., CBS		West Virginia						Allen Fieldhouse; Lawrence, KS
January 6, 2027; 10:00 p.m., ESPN2		at Utah						Jon M. Huntsman Center; Salt Lake City, UT
January 9, 2027; 12:00 p.m., ESPN		at BYU						Marriott Center; Provo, UT
January 13, 2027; 8:00 p.m., ESPN2/ESPNU		Colorado						Allen Fieldhouse; Lawrence, KS
January 16, 2027; 1:00 p.m., FOX/FS1		UCF						Allen Fieldhouse; Lawrence, KS
January 19, 2027; 7:30 p.m., FS1		at Cincinnati						Fifth Third Arena; Cincinnati, OH
January 23, 2027; 11:00 a.m./7:00 p.m., FOX		at Kansas State; Sunflower Showdown						Bramlage Coliseum; Manhattan, KS
January 30, 2027; 11:30 a.m., ESPN/ESPN2		Oklahoma State						Allen Fieldhouse; Lawrence, KS
February 1, 2027; 8:00 p.m., ESPN		at Houston						Fertitta Center; Houston, TX
February 6, 2027; 11:00 a.m., ABC		Texas Tech						Allen Fieldhouse; Lawrence, KS
February 9, 2027; 8:00 p.m., NBCSN/Peacock		Arizona State						Allen Fieldhouse; Lawrence, KS
February 13, 2027; 1:00 p.m., ESPN/ESPN2		at Iowa State						Hilton Coliseum; Ames, IA
February 17, 2027; 8:00 p.m., NBCSN/Peacock		Baylor						Allen Fieldhouse; Lawrence, KS
February 20, 2027; 3:00/3:30 p.m., ESPN		at Arizona						McKale Center; Tucson, AZ
February 24, 2027; 8:00 p.m., ESPN/ESPN2/ESPNU		at TCU						Schollmaier Arena; Fort Worth, TX
February 27, 2027; 1:00 p.m., ESPN/ESPN2		Kansas State; Sunflower Showdown						Allen Fieldhouse; Lawrence, KS
March 1, 2027; 8:00 p.m., ESPN		Iowa State						Allen Fieldhouse; Lawrence, KS
March 6, 2027; 1:30 p.m., CBS		at Baylor						Foster Pavilion; Waco, TX
Big 12 tournament
March 9–13, 2027; TBD, ESPN+/ESPN		vs. TBD; First Round						T-Mobile Center; Kansas City, MO
*Non-conference game. ^{#}Rankings from AP poll. (#) Tournament seedings in parentheses. All times are in Central Time.

== Rankings ==
Ranking movements Legend: ██ Increase in ranking ██ Decrease in ranking т = Tied with team above or below
	Week																				
Poll	Pre	1	2	3	4	5	6	7	8	9	10	11	12	13	14	15	16	17	18	19	Final
AP	17	15	11																		
Coaches	18т	14	9																		

== See also ==
2026–27 Kansas Jayhawks women's basketball team
