= 2026–27 Arizona Wildcats men's basketball team =

American collegiate basketball lineup

2026–27 Arizona Wildcats men's basketball
- Conference: Big 12 Conference

Ranking
- Coaches: No. 12
- AP: No. 12
- Record: 4–1 (0–0 Big 12)
- Head coach: Tommy Lloyd (6th season)
- Associate head coach: Jack Murphy (8th season)
- Assistant coaches: TJ Benson (3rd season); Brandon Chappell (2nd season); Evan Manning (2nd season); Kevin Pangos (1st season)
- Home arena: McKale Center

2026–27 Big 12 men's basketball standings
	Conf.				Overall
Team	W		L	PCT	W		L	PCT
Arizona State	0	–	0	–	5	–	0	1.000
No. 21 BYU	0	–	0	–	5	–	0	1.000
No. 8 Houston	0	–	0	–	5	–	0	1.000
No. 11 Kansas	0	–	0	–	5	–	0	1.000
No. 9 Texas Tech	0	–	0	–	5	–	0	1.000
TCU	0	–	0	–	4	–	0	1.000
No. 12 Arizona	0	–	0	–	4	–	1	.800
Baylor	0	–	0	–	4	–	1	.800
Cincinnati	0	–	0	–	4	–	1	.800
UCF	0	–	0	–	4	–	1	.800
West Virginia	0	–	0	–	4	–	1	.800
Iowa State	0	–	0	–	3	–	1	.750
Kansas State	0	–	0	–	3	–	1	.750
Oklahoma State	0	–	0	–	3	–	1	.750
Utah	0	–	0	–	3	–	1	.750
Colorado	0	–	0	–	2	–	3	.400
† 2027 Big 12 tournament winner As of November 19, 2026; Rankings from AP poll

The 2026–27 Arizona Wildcats men's basketball team will represent the University of Arizona during the 2026–27 NCAA Division I men's basketball season. The team will be led by Tommy Lloyd in his sixth season as head coach. The season will mark the Wildcats' 53rd season at McKale Center in Tucson, Arizona, and their third season as members of the Big 12 Conference.

== Previous season ==
The Wildcats finished the 2025–26 season with 36–3, 16–2 in Big 12 Conference play, finishing winning their first Big 12 regular season title and 30th regular season conference title in school history. They are also the first Arizona team to have 29 regular season wins and received the number 1 seed in the Big 12 tournament and defeated the number 2 seed Houston in the finals 79–74, winning their first Big 12 tournament title. The Wildcats were invited to their 36th NCAA tournament appearance, receiving the number 1 seed in the West Regional, where they defeated 16-seed Long Island and 9-seed Utah State in San Diego, California, Arkansas in the Sweet Sixteen. They advanced to the fifth Final Four for the first time since 25 years in 2001 with a 79–64 victory over second-seeded Purdue at San Jose, California in the Elite Eight, but they lost to number 1 seed (Midwest) Michigan. The 36 wins was the most for any team in Arizona Wildcat basketball history.

== Offseason ==
=== Departures ===
Any players who have declared for the 2026 NBA draft—including seniors, who must opt into this year's draft—have the option to return if they make a timely withdrawal from the draft and end any pre-draft relationships with agents. Thus, separate lists will initially be maintained for confirmed and potential departures.

Arizona Wildcats departures
Name	Number	Pos.	Height	Weight	Year	Hometown	Reason
Jaden Bradley	0	PG	6'3"	200 lb	Sr.	Rochester, NY	Drafted by Toronto Raptors
Anthony Dell'Orso	3	SG	6'6"	190 lb	Sr.	Melbourne, Australia	Signed with Perth Wildcats (NBL)
Jackson Francois	7	SG	6'5"	160 lb	Sr.	Las Vegas, NV	Out of eligibility
Tobe Awaka	30	PF	6'8"	250 lb	Sr.	Hyde Park, NY	Signed with Chicago Bulls
Sven Djopmo	42	G	6'2"	190 lb	Jr.	Reims, France	Transferred to Coppin State
Koa Peat	10	F	6'7"	235 lb	So.	Chandler, AZ	Drafted by Dallas Mavericks & Traded to Phoenix Suns
Brayden Burries	5	G	6'4"	185 lb	So.	San Bernardino, CA	Drafted by Milwaukee Bucks
Dwayne Aristode	2	F	6'7"	210 lb	So.	Lelystad, Netherlands	Transferred to Oregon
Sidi Gueye	15	C	6'11"	205 lb	So.	Guédiawaye, Senegal	Transferred to Santa Clara

=== Acquisitions ===
==== Transfers ====
Arizona Wildcats Transfers
Name	Number	Pos.	Height	Weight	Year	Hometown	Reason
RJ Godfrey	0	F	6'7"	225	Gr.	Suwanee, Georgia	Transferred from Clemson
Derek Dixon	3	G	6'5"	200	So.	Vienna, VA	Transferred from North Carolina
JJ Mandaquit	23	G	6'1"	175	So.	Hilo, HI	Transferred from Washington
Ugnius Jarusevicius	21	F	6'11"	245	Gr.	Alytus, Lithuania	Transferred from Nebraska
Evan Otten	30	F	6'11"	220	RS-Jr.	Redmond, OR	Transferred from Idaho State

=== Recruiting classes ===
==== 2026 recruiting class ====
College recruiting
Name	Hometown	School	Height	Weight	Commit date
Caleb Holt #1 Shooting guard	New Market, AL	Prolific Prep (FL)	6 ft 5 in (1.96 m)	200 lb (91 kg)	Mar 10, 2026
Caleb Holt #1 Shooting guard	Recruit ratings: 247Sports: On3: ESPN: (94)				
Cameron Holmes; Small forward	Nashville, TN	Millennium HS (AZ)	6 ft 5 in (1.96 m)	194 lb (88 kg)	Nov 9, 2025
Cameron Holmes; Small forward	Recruit ratings: 247Sports: On3: ESPN: (87)				
Endurance Aiyamenkhue; Center	The Hauge, Netherlands	Ratiopharm Ulm (Germany)	6 ft 11 in (2.11 m)	220 lb (100 kg)	May 8, 2026
Endurance Aiyamenkhue; Center	Recruit ratings: 247Sports: On3: ESPN: (NA)				
Maksim Brnovic; Small forward	Podgorica, Montenegro	Basketball Club Zalgiris (Lithuania)	6 ft 10 in (2.08 m)	198 lb (90 kg)	Jun 26, 2026
Maksim Brnovic; Small forward	Recruit ratings: 247Sports: On3: ESPN: (NA)				
Overall recruit ranking: 247Sports: 29 On3: 19 ESPN: 13
Note: In many cases, Scout, Rivals, 247Sports, On3, and ESPN may conflict in their listings of height and weight.; In these cases, the average was taken. ESPN grades are on a 100-point scale.; Sources: "2026 Arizona Wildcats Recruiting Class". ESPN.; "2026 Team Ranking". Rivals.; "2026 Arizona 24/7 Sports Commits". 247Sports.; "2026 Arizona Wildcats Basketball Industry Comparison Commits". On3.

2026 overall class rankings

Website	National rank	Conference rank	5-star recruits	4-star recruits	Total
ESPN	13	NR	1	1	3
On3 Recruits	19	4	1	2	3
247 Sports	29	6	1	1	3

== Preseason ==
The Big 12 preseason coaches & media poll will be released in October 2026. All awards will be voted on by the league's 16 head coaches, who can not vote for their own team or players.

Big 12 Preseason Coaches Poll

	Big 12 Coaches	Points
1.	Arizona	220 (12)
2.	Houston	214 (4)
3.	Kansas	186
4.	Iowa State	181
5.	Texas Tech	180
6.	BYU	148
7.	TCU	137
T8.	Cincinnati	116
T8.	West Virginia	116
10.	Baylor	102
11.	Oklahoma State	98
12.	Arizona State	75
13.	UCF	55
T14.	Colorado	34
T14.	Kansas State	34
16.	Utah	24
Reference: (#) first-place votes

Big 12 Preseason Media Poll

	Big 12 Coaches
1.	Arizona
2.	Houston
3.	Kansas
4.	Texas Tech
5.	Iowa State
6.	BYU
7.	Baylor
8.	TCU
9.	Cincinnati
10.	West Virginia
11.	Oklahoma State
12.	Arizona State
13.	UCF
14.	Kansas State
15.	Colorado
16.	Utah

All-Big 12 Preseason First team

Player	School	Pos.	Yr.	Ht., Wt.	Hometown (Last School)
Ivan Kharchenkov	Arizona	F	So.	6'7", 230	Munich, Germany (Bayern Munich)
Motiejus Krivas	Arizona	C	Jr.	7'2", 260	Siauliai, Lithuania (BC Žalgiris)
Paulius Murauskas	Arizona State	F	Sr.	6'8", 235	Kaunas, Lithuania (St. Mary's)
Robert Wright III†	BYU	G	Jr.	6'1", 183	Wilmington, DE (Baylor)
Dedan Thomas Jr.	Houston	G	Sr.	6'1", 180	Las Vegas, NV (LSU)
Joseph Tugler	Houston	F	Sr.	6'8", 230	Houston, TX (Cypress Falls HS)
Tamin Lipsey	Iowa State	G	GS	6'1", 200	Ames, IA (Ames HS)
Tyran Stokes	Kansas	G	Fr.	6'7", 230	Louisville, KY (Rainer Beach HS)
Xavier Edmonds	TCU	F	Sr.	6'8", 252	Long Beach, CA (Salt Lake CC)
JT Toppin†	Texas Tech	F	Sr.	6'9", 230	Dallas, TX (New Mexico)
† denotes unanimous selection Reference:

- Player of the Year: Motiejus Krivas, Arizona
- Co-Newcomer of the Year: Paulius Murauskas, Arizona State
- Freshman of the Year: Tyran Stokes, Kansas

=== Award watch lists ===
Listed in the order that they were released

Award	Player	Position	Year	Source
Jerry West Award	Caleb Holt	SG	Fr.	
Naismith College Player of the Year	Caleb Holt	SG	Fr.	
Julius Erving Award	Ivan Kharchenkov	SF	So.	
Naismith College Player of the Year	Ivan Kharchenkov	SF	So.	
Kareem Abdul-Jabbar Award	Motiejus Krivas	C	Jr.	
Naismith College Player of the Year	Motiejus Krivas	C	Jr.	

== Personnel ==
=== Roster ===
2026–27 Arizona Wildcats men's basketball team
Players
Coaches

Pos.	#	Name	Height	Weight	Year	Previous school	Hometown
F	0	RJ Godfrey	6 ft 8 in (2.03 m)	240 lb (109 kg)	GS	Clemson	Suwanee, GA
G	2	Cameron Holmes	6 ft 6 in (1.98 m)	215 lb (98 kg)	Fr	Millennium HS (AZ)	Goodyear, AZ
G	3	Caleb Holt	6 ft 5 in (1.96 m)	215 lb (98 kg)	Fr	Prolific Prep (FL)	Huntsville, AL
G	6	Bryce James	6 ft 5 in (1.96 m)	195 lb (88 kg)	So	Sierra Canyon School (CA)	Akron, OH
G	7	Derek Dixon	6 ft 5 in (1.96 m)	205 lb (93 kg)	So	North Carolina	Vienna, VA
F	8	Ivan Kharchenkov	6 ft 7 in (2.01 m)	230 lb (104 kg)	So	FC Bayern Munich (GER)	Munich, Germany
G	11	Jackson Cook (W)	6 ft 3 in (1.91 m)	185 lb (84 kg)	Sr	Montverde Academy (FL)	Oxford, England
F	12	Ugnius Jaruševičius	6 ft 11 in (2.11 m)	255 lb (116 kg)	GS	Nebraska	Alytus, Lithuania
C	13	Motiejus Krivas	7 ft 2 in (2.18 m)	260 lb (118 kg)	Sr	Kaunas Zalgiris II (LTU)	Šiauliai, Lithuania
C	14	Endurance Aiyamenkhue	6 ft 11 in (2.11 m)	235 lb (107 kg)	Fr	Ratiopharm Ulm (GER)	Amsterdam, Netherlands
F	20	Mabil Mawut	6 ft 11 in (2.11 m)	200 lb (91 kg)	So	Our Saviour Lutheran School (NY)	Bor, South Sudan
G	21	Joaquin Rigdon (W)	6 ft 3 in (1.91 m)	185 lb (84 kg)	Fr	Pacifica Christian High School	Costa Mesa, CA
G	22	Addison Arnold	6 ft 3 in (1.91 m)	185 lb (84 kg)	Jr	Royal HS	Simi Valley, CA
G	23	JJ Mandaquit	6 ft 1 in (1.85 m)	190 lb (86 kg)	So	Washington	Hilo, HI
F	30	Evan Otten	6 ft 11 in (2.11 m)	240 lb (109 kg)	Sr	Idaho State	Redmond, OR
F	35	Maksim Brnovic	6 ft 10 in (2.08 m)	210 lb (95 kg)	Fr	Basketball Club Zalgiris (LTU)	Podgorica, Montenegro

Head coach

- Tommy Lloyd (Whitman)

Assistant coach(es)

- Jack Murphy (Arizona)
- TJ Benson (Grand Canyon)
- Brandon Chappell (Lamar)
- Evan Manning (Kansas)
- Kevin Pangos (Gonzaga)

Legend

- (C) Team captain
- (S) Suspended
- (I) Ineligible
- (W) Walk-on
- Injured
- Current redshirt

Roster

Note: Players' year is based on remaining eligibility.

=== Red and Blue game ===
Arizona played its annual Red Blue game on September 26, 2026. The team split into two teams, Red and Blue and proceeded to play an inter-squad scrimmage. The night featured a basketball game with Arizona's Adaptive Athletics wheelchair basketball team, in–game entertainment featuring DJ Pauly D and DJ Mix Master Mike and a post–game performance by Diplo.

The three point contest featured players from both the Men's and Women's team: with Derek Dixon and Caleb Holt competing for the Men's team and Sumayah Sugapong and Priyanka Ponnam competing for the Women's. In the first round Sugapong defeated Ponnam 13–9, while Dixon defeated Holt 14–13. In the finals Sugapong defeated Dixon, 18–16, making her final moneyball shot from the corner. The dunk contest featured three freshman: Cameron Holmes, Maksim Brnović and Ugnius Jaruševičius. There was six judges giving scores 1–10, with the top two finishers advancing to the finals. Holmes and Brnović were the two players competing in the finals, with Holmes receiving 10's from all six judges, thus winning the 2026–27 Arizona dunk contest.

The Arizona Men's basketball team was then split into two squads to compete in an intersquad scrimmage. The Red team was coached by assistant coaches Brandon Chappell and Evan Nelson with the team having: Endurance Aiyamenkhue, Addison Arnold, Maksim Brnović, Montiejus Krivas, Bryce James, Ivan Kharchenkov, JJ Mandaquit and Mabil Mawut. Thee Blue team was coached by assistant coaches TJ Benson and Jack Murphy: RJ Godfrey, Cameron Holmes, Caleb Holt, Derek Dixon, Jackson Cook, Ugnius Jaruševičius, Joaquin Rigdon and Evan Otten. The Red team won the twenty minute scrimmage, 42–32, with Kharchenkov leading all scorers with 13 points and 4 assists. Krivas lead both teams in rebounds with 5.

== Schedule and results ==
Date time, TV	Rank^{#}	Opponent^{#}	Result	Record	High points	High rebounds	High assists	Site (attendance) city, state
Lithuania Exhibition Tour (2–1)
August 19, 2026*; 9:30 a.m., YouTube		vs. Lithuania B Team	L 88–99	0–1	25 – I. Kharchenkov	6 – Tied	5 – C. Holt	Jonava Sports Arena (1,379); Jonava, Lithuania
August 20, 2026*; 8:00 a.m., YouTube		vs. Ukraine Senior National Team	W 107–85	1–1	24 – I. Kharchenkov	14 – C. Holt	5 – Tied	Kėdainiai Arena (300); Kėdainiai, Lithuania
August 22, 2026*; 9:30 a.m., YouTube		vs. Lithuania Senior National Team	W 88–74	2–1	30 – I. Kharchenkov	9 – M. Krivas	6 – D. Dixon	Alytus Arena (2,843); Aytus, Lithuania
Exhibition (2–0)
October 13, 2026*; 7:00 p.m., ESPN+		San Francisco	W 93–69	1–0	20 – M. Krivas	6 – M. Krivas	3 – Tied	McKale Center (12,478); Tucson, AZ
October 16, 2026*; 7:00 p.m., ESPN+		San Diego State	W 82–67	2–0	17 – M. Krivas	15 – M. Krivas	4 – Tied	McKale Center (13,661); Tucson, AZ
October 23, 2026*; 7:00 p.m., ESPN+	No. 5	Eastern Washington	W 85–54	3–0	21 – C. Holt	8 – M. Krivas	5 – Tied	McKale Center (12,897); Tucson, AZ
Non-conference regular season
November 2, 2026*; 8:00 p.m., TNT/TruTV	No. 5	vs. No. 22 UCLA; Rivalry / Hall of Fame Series − Las Vegas	L 75–84	0–1	38 – I. Kharchenkov	10 – I. Kharchenkov	6 – J. Mandaquit	T-Mobile Arena (10,777); Las Vegas, NV
November 5, 2026*; 8:30 p.m., TruTV	No. 5	Cal Poly	W 104–84	1–1	30 – M. Krivas	10 – I. Kharchenkov	7 – I. Kharchenkov	McKale Center (13,989); Tucson, AZ
November 10, 2026*; 7:00 p.m., ESPN+	No. 12	Northern Arizona	W 90–59	2–1	20 – I. Kharchenkov	7 – Tied	7 – Tied	McKale Center (14,041); Tucson, AZ
November 13, 2026*; 7:00 p.m., ESPN2	No. 12	at Auburn	W 80–69	3–1	24 – C. Holt	11 – M. Krivas	4 – M. Krivas	Neville Arena (9,121); Auburn, AL
November 18, 2026*; 7:00 p.m., FS1	No. 12	No. 3 UConn	W 85–79	4–1	20 – I. Kharchenkov	12 – M. Krivas	7 – I. Kharchenkov	McKale Center (14,688); Tucson, AZ
November 23, 2026*; 9:30 p.m., ESPN2		vs. Colorado State; Maui Invitational First round						Lahaina Civic Center; Lahaina, HI
November 24, 2026*; 3:00/8:30 p.m., ESPN2/ESPNU		vs. Providence/VCU; Maui Invitational						Lahaina Civic Center; Lahaina, HI
November 25, 2026*; 12:30/3:30/8:00/10:00 p.m., ESPN/ESPN2		vs. BYU/Clemson/Ole Miss/Washington; Maui Invitational						Lahaina Civic Center; Lahaina, HI
December 1, 2026*; 7:00 p.m., ESPN+		LSU New Orleans						McKale Center; Tucson, AZ
December 5, 2026*; 10:00 a.m., FOX		vs. St. John's; Hall of Fame Series − New York City						Madison Square Garden; New York City, NY
December 12, 2026*; 12:30 p.m., CBSSN		Tennessee Tech						McKale Center; Tucson, AZ
December 19, 2026*; 4:30 p.m., ESPN		vs. Arkansas; Hall of Fame Series − Phoenix						Mortgage Matchup Center; Phoenix, Arizona
December 21, 2026*; 7:00 p.m., CBSSN		Northern Illinois						McKale Center; Tucson, AZ
December 28, 2026*; 7:00 p.m., TruTV		Incarnate Word						McKale Center; Tucson, AZ
Big 12 regular season
January 2, 2027; 6:00 p.m., ESPN		at Iowa State						Hilton Coliseum; Ames, IA
January 6, 2027; 7:00 p.m., Peacock		UCF						McKale Center; Tucson, AZ
January 9, 2027; 10:00 a.m., CBS		at Kansas State						Bramlage Coliseum; Manhattan, KS
January 12, 2027; 9:00 p.m., ESPN		BYU						McKale Center; Tucson, AZ
January 16, 2027; 4:00 p.m., ESPN/ESPN2		Arizona State; Rivalry						McKale Center; Tucson, AZ
January 22, 2027; 6:00 p.m., FOX		at Texas Tech						United Supermarkets Arena; Lubbock, TX
January 26, 2027; 8:00 p.m., FS1		Utah						McKale Center; Tucson, AZ
January 30, 2027; 6:00 p.m., ESPN/ESPN2		at West Virginia						WVU Coliseum; Morgantown, WV
February 2, 2027; 5:00 p.m., Peacock		at Cincinnati						Fifth Third Arena; Cincinnati, OH
February 6, 2027; 2:00/2:30 p.m., ESPN		Houston						McKale Center; Tucson, AZ
February 8, 2027; 7:00 p.m., ESPN2		TCU						McKale Center; Tucson, AZ
February 13, 2027; 6:00 p.m., FOX		at Arizona State; Rivalry						Desert Financial Arena; Tempe, AZ
February 16, 2027; 7:00 p.m., ESPN/ESPN2		at Oklahoma State						Gallagher-Iba Arena; Stillwater, OK
February 20, 2027; 2:00/2:30 p.m., ESPN		Kansas						McKale Center; Tucson, AZ
February 22, 2027; 7:00 p.m., ESPN		at BYU						Marriott Center; Provo, UT
February 27, 2027; 12:00 p.m., CBS		Baylor						McKale Center; Tucson, AZ
March 3, 2027; 7:00 p.m., FS1		Colorado						McKale Center; Tucson, AZ
March 6, 2027; 6:00/6:30 p.m., ESPN		at Houston						Fertitta Center; Houston, TX
Big 12 tournament
March 9–13, 2027; TBD, ESPN+/ESPN		vs. TBD; First Round						T-Mobile Center; Kansas City, MO
*Non-conference game. ^{#}Rankings from AP poll. (#) Tournament seedings in parentheses. All times are in Mountain Standard Time.

== Game summaries ==
This section will be filled in as the season progresses.

=== Lithuania Exhibition Tour ===
==== Lithuania B Team ====
YouTube

August 19, 2026
9:30 a.m.

Box Score

Lithuania B Team 99, Arizona Wildcats 88
Scoring by quarter: 30–19, 24–18, 21–24, 24–27
Pts: Matas Repšys, 24; Rebs: Modestas Kancleris, 8 Asts: Dominykas Stenionis, 10	Pts: Ivan Kharchenkov, 25; Rebs: Tied, 6 Asts: Caleb Holt, 5

Jonava Sports Arena, Jonava, Lithuania
Attendance: 1,379
Referees: Ignas Kutka, Gintaras Mačiulis, Darius Šomka

==== Ukraine Senior National Team ====
YouTube

August 20, 2026
7:00 a.m.

Box Score

Ukraine Senior National Team 85, Arizona Wildcats 107
Scoring by quarter: 24–33, 20–28, 24–19, 17–27
Pts: Tied, 16; Rebs: Vyacheslav Bobrov, 6 Asts: Denys Lukashov, 5	Pts: Ivan Kharchenkov, 24; Rebs: Caleb Holt, 14; Asts: Tied, 5

Kėdainiai Arena, Kėdainiai, Lithuania
Attendance: 300
Referees: Aurimas Borusas, Jurgis Laurinavičius, Vidmantas Rušinas

==== Lithuania Senior National Team ====
YouTube

August 22, 2026
9:30 a.m.

Box Score

Lithuania Senior National Team 74, Arizona Wildcats 88
Scoring by quarter: 15–23, 25–20, 15–26, 19–19
Pts: Augustas Marčiulionis, 15; Rebs: Regimantas Miniotas, 6 Asts: Tied, 3	Pts: Ivan Kharchenkov, 30; Rebs: Motiejus Krivas, 9 Asts: Derek Dixon, 6

Alytus Arena, Aytus, Lithuania
Attendance: 2,843
Referees: Gvidas Gedvilas, Donaldas Kairys, Andžej Urbanovič

=== Exhibition ===
==== San Francisco ====
ESPN+

October 13, 2026
7:00 p.m.

Box Score

San Francisco 69, Arizona Wildcats 93
Scoring by half: 34–52, 35–39
Pts: Dylan Bordón, 22; Rebs: Ben Oosterbaan, 5 Asts: Dylan Bordón, 4	Pts: Motiejus Krivas, 20; Rebs: Motiejus Krivas, 6 Asts: Tied, 3

McKale Center, Tucson, AZ
Attendance: 12,478
Referees: Bret Smith, Clarence Armstrong, Doug Sirmons

==== San Diego State ====
ESPN+

October 16, 2026
7:00 p.m.

Box Score

San Diego State 67, Arizona Wildcats 82
Scoring by half: 32–40, 35–42
Pts: Isaiah Sy, 17; Rebs: Jeremiah Cherry, 9 Asts: Elzie Harrington, 4	Pts: Motiejus Krivas, 17; Rebs: Motiejus Krivas, 15; Asts: Ivan Kharchenkov, 4

McKale Center, Tucson, AZ
Referees: Marques Pettigrew, Gregory Nixon, Tommy Johnson

==== Eastern Washington ====
ESPN+

October 23, 2026
7:00 p.m.

Box Score

Eastern Washington 54, No. 5 Arizona Wildcats 85
Scoring by half: 26–50, 28–35
Pts: Jamil Miller, 10; Rebs: Tied, 4 Asts: Jalen Griffith, 3	Pts: Caleb Holt, 21; Rebs: Motiejus Krivas, 8 Asts: Tied, 5

McKale Center, Tucson, AZ
Attendance: 12,897
Referees: Darron George, Tyler Kumpf, De Selle Dean

=== Regular season ===
==== vs UCLA (Hall of Fame Series – Las Vegas) ====
TNT/TruTV

November 2, 2026
8:00 p.m.

Box Score

No. 22 UCLA Bruins 84, No. 5 Arizona Wildcats 75
Scoring by half: 43–29, 41– 47
Pts: Trent Perry, 21; Rebs: Eric Dailey, 8 Asts: Jaylen Petty, 7	Pts: Ivan Kharchenkov, 38; Rebs: Ivan Kharchenkov, 10; Asts: JJ Mandaquit, 6

T-Mobile Arena, Las Vegas, NV
Attendance: 10,777
Referees: Mike Reed, Greg Nixon, Steve Anderson

==== Cal Poly ====
TruTV

November 5, 2026
8:30 p.m.

Box Score

Cal Poly Mustangs 84, No. 5 Arizona Wildcats 104
Scoring by half: 41–59, 43–45
Pts: Hamad Mousa, 30; Rebs: Assran, 5 Asts: Tied, 6, 3	Pts: Motiejus Krivas, 30; Rebs: Ivan Kharchenkov, 10; Asts: Ivan Kharchenkov, 7

McKale Center, Tucson, AZ
Attendance: 13,989
Referees: Doug Sirmon, Keith Patterson, John St. Clair

==== Northern Arizona ====
ESPN+

November 10, 2026
7:00 p.m.

Box Score

Northern Arizona Lumberjacks 59, No. 12 Arizona Wildcats 90
Scoring by half: 22–46, 37–44
Pts: Chris Koman, 17; Rebs: Lucas Toukam, 7 Asts: Chris Koman, 5	Pts: Ivan Kharchenkov, 20; Rebs: Tied, 7 Asts: Tied, 7

McKale Center, Tucson, AZ
Attendance: 14,041
Referees: Greg Nixon, Chance Moore, Deldre Carr

==== at Auburn ====
ESPN2

November 13, 2026
7:00 p.m.

Box Score

No. 12 Arizona Wildcats 80, Auburn Tigers 69
Scoring by half: 36–32, 44–37
Pts: Caleb Holt, 24; Rebs: Motiejus Krivas, 12; Asts: Motiejus Krivas, 4	Pts: Thomas Dowd, 15; Rebs: Thomas Dowd, 9 Asts: Tied, 3

Neville Arena, Auburn, AL
Attendance: 9,121
Referees: Pat Adams, Courtney Green, Tony Padilla

==== UConn ====
FS1

November 18, 2026
7:00 p.m.

Box Score

No. 3 UConn Huskies 79, No. 12 Arizona Wildcats 85
Scoring by half: 29–47, 50–38
Pts: Braylon Mullins, 29; Rebs: Colben Landrew, 10; Asts: Silas Demary, 6	Pts: Ivan Kharchenkov, 20; Rebs: Motiejus Krivas, 12; Asts: Ivan Kharchenkov , 7

McKale Center, Tucson, AZ
Attendance: 14,688
Referees: Kipp Kissinger, Doug Sermons, John Gaffney

==== vs Colorado State (Maui Invitational – 1st round) ====
ESPN2

November 23, 2026
9:30 p.m.

Colorado State Rams vs. Arizona Wildcats
Scoring by half: –, –

Lahaina Civic Center, Lahaina, HI

==== Providence/VCU (Maui Invitational – Semifinal/Consolation 2nd Round) ====
ESPN2/ESPNU

November 24, 2026
3:00/8:30 p.m.

Providence Friars/VCU Rams vs. Arizona Wildcats
Scoring by half: –, –

Lahaina Civic Center, Lahaina, HI

==== BYU/Clemson/Ole Miss/Washington (Maui Invitational – Championship/3rd/5th/7th Place Game) ====
ESPN/ESPN2

November 25, 2026
12:30/3:30/8:00/10:00 p.m.

BYU Cougars/Clemson Tigers/Ole Miss Rebels/Washington Huskies vs. Arizona Wildcats
Scoring by half: –, –

Lahaina Civic Center, Lahaina, HI

==== LSU New Orleans ====
ESPN+

December 1, 2026
7:00 p.m.

LSU New Orleans Privateers vs. Arizona Wildcats
Scoring by half: –, –

McKale Center, Tucson, AZ

==== vs St. John's (Hall of Fame Series – New York) ====
FOX

December 5, 2026
10:00 a.m.

St. John's Red Storm vs. Arizona Wildcats
Scoring by half: –, –

Madison Square Garden, New York City, NY

==== Tennessee Tech ====
CBSSN

December 12, 2026
12:30 p.m.

Tennessee Tech Golden Eagles vs. Arizona Wildcats
Scoring by half: –, –

McKale Center, Tucson, AZ

==== vs Arkansas (Hall of Fame Series – Phoenix) ====
ESPN

December 19, 2026
4:30 p.m.

Arkansas Razorbacks vs. Arizona Wildcats
Scoring by half: –, –

Mortgage Matchup Center, Phoenix, Arizona

==== Northern Illinois ====
CBSSN

December 21, 2026
7:00 p.m.

Northern Illinois Huskies vs. Arizona Wildcats
Scoring by half: –, –

McKale Center, Tucson, AZ

==== Incarnate Word ====
TruTV

December 28, 2026
7:00 p.m.

Incarnate Word Cardinals vs. Arizona Wildcats
Scoring by half: –, –

McKale Center, Tucson, AZ

=== Big 12 season ===
==== at Iowa State ====
ESPN

January 2, 2027
6:00 p.m.

Arizona Wildcats vs. Iowa State Cyclones
Scoring by half: –, –

Hilton Coliseum, Ames, IA

==== UCF ====
Peacock

January 6, 2027
7:00 p.m.

UCF Knights vs. Arizona Wildcats
Scoring by half: –, –

McKale Center, Tucson, AZ

==== at Kansas State ====
CBS

January 9, 2027
10:00 a.m.

Arizona Wildcats vs. Kansas State Wildcats
Scoring by half: –, –

Bramlage Coliseum, Manhattan, KS

==== BYU ====
ESPN

January 12, 2027
9:00 p.m.

BYU Cougars vs. Arizona Wildcats
Scoring by half: –, –

McKale Center, Tucson, AZ

==== Arizona State ====
ESPN/ESPN2

January 16, 2027
4:00 p.m.

Arizona State Sun Devils vs. Arizona Wildcats
Scoring by half: –, –

McKale Center, Tucson, AZ

==== at Texas Tech ====
FOX

January 22, 2027
6:00 p.m.

Arizona Wildcats vs. Texas Tech Red Raiders
Scoring by half: –, –

United Supermarkets Arena, Lubbock, TX

==== Utah ====
FS1

January 26, 2027
8:00 p.m.

Utah Utes vs. Arizona Wildcats
Scoring by half: –, –

McKale Center, Tucson, AZ

==== at West Virginia ====
ESPN/ESPN2

January 30, 2027
6:00 p.m.

Arizona Wildcats vs. West Virginia Mountaineers
Scoring by half: –, –

WVU Coliseum, Morgantown, WV

==== at Cincinnati ====
Peacock

February 2, 2027
5:00 p.m.

Arizona Wildcats vs. Cincinnati Bearcats
Scoring by half: –, –

Fifth Third Arena, Cincinnati, OH

==== Houston ====
ESPN

February 6, 2027
2:00/2:30 p.m.

Houston Cougars vs. Arizona Wildcats
Scoring by half: –, –

McKale Center, Tucson, AZ

==== TCU ====
ESPN2

February 8, 2027
7:00 p.m.

TCU Horned Frogs vs. Arizona Wildcats
Scoring by half: –, –

McKale Center, Tucson, AZ

==== at Arizona State ====
FOX

February 13, 2027
6:00 p.m.

Arizona Wildcats vs. Arizona State Sun Devils
Scoring by half: –, –

Desert Financial Arena, Tempe, AZ

==== at Oklahoma State ====
ESPN/ESPN2

February 16, 2027
7:00 p.m.

Arizona Wildcats vs. Oklahoma State Cowboys
Scoring by half: –, –

Gallagher-Iba Arena, Stillwater, OK

==== Kansas ====
ESPN

February 20, 2027
2:00/2:30 p.m.

Kansas Jayhawks vs. Arizona Wildcats
Scoring by half: –, –

McKale Center, Tucson, AZ

==== at BYU ====
ESPN

February 22, 2027
7:00 p.m.

Arizona Wildcats vs. BYU Cougars
Scoring by half: –, –

Marriott Center, Provo, UT

==== Baylor ====
CBS

February 27, 2027
12:00 p.m.

Baylor Bears vs. Arizona Wildcats
Scoring by half: –, –

McKale Center, Tucson, AZ

==== Colorado ====
FS1

March 3, 2027
7:00 p.m.

Colorado Buffaloes vs. Arizona Wildcats
Scoring by half: –, –

McKale Center, Tucson, AZ

==== at Houston ====
ESPN

March 6, 2027
6:00/6:30 p.m.

Arizona Wildcats vs. Houston Cougars
Scoring by half: –, –

Fertitta Center, Houston, TX

=== Postseason ===
==== vs TBD (Big 12 Tournament) ====
ESPN+/ESPN

March 9–13, 2027
TBA

TBD vs. Arizona Wildcats
Scoring by half: –, –

T-Mobile Center, Kansas City, MO

== Uniform combinations ==
Team	White	Navy	Red	Sources
Arizona Wildcats	7	1	0	

== Rankings ==
Ranking movements Legend: ██ Increase in ranking ██ Decrease in ranking
	Week																				
Poll	Pre	1	2	3	4	5	6	7	8	9	10	11	12	13	14	15	16	17	18	19	Final
AP	5	12	12																		
Coaches	4	11	12																		
