= 2026–27 Kansas State Wildcats men's basketball team =

American college basketball season

2026–27 Kansas State Wildcats men's basketball
- Conference: Big 12 Conference
- Record: 3–2 (0–0 Big 12)
- Head coach: Casey Alexander (1st season)
- Assistant coaches: JJ Butler; John Cooper; Phil Cunningham; Kerron Johnson; Luke Smith
- Home arena: Bramlage Coliseum

2026–27 Big 12 men's basketball standings
	Conf.				Overall
Team	W		L	PCT	W		L	PCT
No. 8 Houston	0	–	0	–	6	–	0	1.000
Arizona State	0	–	0	–	5	–	0	1.000
No. 21 BYU	0	–	0	–	5	–	0	1.000
No. 9 Texas Tech	0	–	0	–	5	–	0	1.000
No. 11 Kansas	0	–	0	–	5	–	1	.833
No. 12 Arizona	0	–	0	–	4	–	1	.800
Baylor	0	–	0	–	4	–	1	.800
Cincinnati	0	–	0	–	4	–	1	.800
TCU	0	–	0	–	4	–	1	.800
Iowa State	0	–	0	–	3	–	1	.750
West Virginia	0	–	0	–	4	–	2	.667
UCF	0	–	0	–	4	–	2	.667
Kansas State	0	–	0	–	3	–	2	.600
Oklahoma State	0	–	0	–	3	–	2	.600
Utah	0	–	0	–	3	–	2	.600
Colorado	0	–	0	–	2	–	3	.400
† 2027 Big 12 tournament winner As of November 21, 2026; Rankings from AP poll

The 2026–27 Kansas State Wildcats men's basketball team represents Kansas State University in the 2026–27 NCAA Division I men's basketball season, their 124th basketball season. The Wildcats are led by first year head coach Casey Alexander. They play their home games in Bramlage Coliseum in Manhattan, Kansas as members of the Big 12 Conference.

== Previous season ==
The Wildcats finished the 2025–26 season 12–20, 3–15 in Big 12 play to finish in 15th place. As a 15th seed in the Big 12 tournament they would face against 10th seed BYU and would lose 105–91. Midway through the season, Jerome Tang was fired and named associate head coach Matthew Driscoll the interim for the remainder of the season.

== Offseason ==
=== Departures ===
Name	Number	Pos.	Height	Weight	Year	Hometown	Reason for departure
Elias Rapieque	0	F	6'8"	218	Freshman	Berlin, Germany	Transferred to Loyola–Chicago
Abdi Bashir Jr.	1	G	6'7"	160	Junior	Omaha, NE	Transferred to LSU
Exavier Wilson	2	G	6'1"	195	Freshman	Columbia, MO	Transferred to Akron
C. J. Jones	3	G	6'5"	195	Senior	East St. Louis, Illinois	Graduated
PJ Haggerty	4	G	6'3"	191	RS-Senior	Crosby, TX	Transferred to Texas A&M
David Castillo	10	G	6'1"	170	Freshman	Bartlesville, OK	Transferred to Santa Clara
Mobi Ikegwuruka	14	G	6'6"	215	Junior	Galway, Ireland	Transferred to Troy
Taj Manning	15	G/F	6'7"	220	RS-Junior	Grandview, MO	Transferred to Iowa State
Khamari McGriff	21	F	6'9"	210	RS-Senior	Tallahassee, FL	Graduated
Dorin Buca	22	C	7'2"	254	Junior	Perugia, Italy	Transferred to Rutgers
Stephen Osei	23	F	6'10"	210	Sophomore	Toronto, Canada	Transferred to Monmouth
Nate Johnson	34	G	6'3"	205	RS-Senior	Liberty Township, OH	Graduated

=== Incoming transfers ===
Name	Number	Pos.	Height	Weight	Year	Hometown	Previous school
Brandon Rechsteiner	1	G	6'1"	190	Senior	Acworth, GA	Colorado State
Jaden Schutt	2	G	6'5"	200	Senior	Yorkville, IL	Virginia Tech
Dezdrick Lindsay	4	F	6'6"	215	Senior	Louisville, KY	Oregon
Brock Vice	6	F	6'10"	238	Junior	Memphis, TN	Murray State
Isaiah Abraham	7	F	6'7"	205	Junior	Gainesville, VA	Georgetown
Montana Wheeler	11	G	5'10"	170	Sophomore	Houston, TX	Bradley
Matt Gilhool	13	F	6'11"	213	Sophomore	Elizabethtown, PA	LSU
Pape N'Diaye	22	F	7'0"	230	Junior	Abidjan, Ivory Coast	Xavier
JT Rock	35	C	7'1"	255	Junior	Sioux Falls, SD	New Mexico
Timotej Malovec	88	F	6'8"	214	Junior	Ivanka pri Dunaji, Slovakia	Miami (FL)

=== Recruiting classes ===
==== 2026 recruiting class ====
College recruiting
Name	Hometown	School	Height	Weight	Commit date
Jaylen Alexander; G	Oxford, AL	Oxford High School	6 ft 2 in (1.88 m)	185 lb (84 kg)	Mar 28, 2026
Jaylen Alexander; G	Recruit ratings: 247Sports:				
Devin Hutcherson; F	Atlanta, GA	Holy Innocents Episcopal School	6 ft 4 in (1.93 m)	180 lb (82 kg)	Mar 27, 2026
Devin Hutcherson; F	Recruit ratings: Rivals: 247Sports:				
Nash Stark; F	Nashville, TN	Lipscomb Academy	6 ft 7 in (2.01 m)	230 lb (100 kg)	
Nash Stark; F	Recruit ratings: No ratings found				
Overall recruit ranking:
Note: In many cases, Scout, Rivals, 247Sports, On3, and ESPN may conflict in their listings of height and weight.; In these cases, the average was taken. ESPN grades are on a 100-point scale.; Sources: "2026 Kansas State Basketball Commits". Rivals.; "2026 Kansas State Basketball Commits". Scout.; "2026 Kansas State Basketball Commits". ESPN.; "Scout.com Team Recruiting Rankings". Scout.; "2026 Team Ranking". Rivals.

== Preseason ==
The Big 12 preseason coaches & media poll will be released in October 2026. All awards will be voted on by the league's 16 head coaches, who can not vote for their own team or players.

Big 12 Preseason Coaches Poll

	Big 12 Coaches	Points
1.	Arizona	220 (12)
2.	Houston	214 (4)
3.	Kansas	186
4.	Iowa State	181
5.	Texas Tech	180
6.	BYU	148
7.	TCU	137
T8.	Cincinnati	116
T8.	West Virginia	116
10.	Baylor	102
11.	Oklahoma State	98
12.	Arizona State	75
13.	UCF	55
T14.	Colorado	34
T14.	Kansas State	34
16.	Utah	24
Reference: (#) first-place votes

Big 12 Preseason Media Poll

	Big 12 Coaches
1.	Arizona
2.	Houston
3.	Kansas
4.	Texas Tech
5.	Iowa State
6.	BYU
7.	Baylor
8.	TCU
9.	Cincinnati
10.	West Virginia
11.	Oklahoma State
12.	Arizona State
13.	UCF
14.	Kansas State
15.	Colorado
16.	Utah

All-Big 12 Preseason First team

Player	School	Pos.	Yr.	Ht., Wt.	Hometown (Last School)
Ivan Kharchenkov	Arizona	F	So.	6'7", 230	Munich, Germany (Bayern Munich)
Motiejus Krivas	Arizona	C	Jr.	7'2", 260	Siauliai, Lithuania (BC Žalgiris)
Paulius Murauskas	Arizona State	F	Sr.	6'8", 235	Kaunas, Lithuania (St. Mary's)
Robert Wright III†	BYU	G	Jr.	6'1", 183	Wilmington, DE (Baylor)
Dedan Thomas Jr.	Houston	G	Sr.	6'1", 180	Las Vegas, NV (LSU)
Joseph Tugler	Houston	F	Sr.	6'8", 230	Houston, TX (Cypress Falls HS)
Tamin Lipsey	Iowa State	G	GS	6'1", 200	Ames, IA (Ames HS)
Tyran Stokes	Kansas	G	Fr.	6'7", 230	Louisville, KY (Rainer Beach HS)
Xavier Edmonds	TCU	F	Sr.	6'8", 252	Long Beach, CA (Salt Lake CC)
JT Toppin†	Texas Tech	F	Sr.	6'9", 230	Dallas, TX (New Mexico)
† denotes unanimous selection Reference:

- Player of the Year: Motiejus Krivas, Arizona
- Co-Newcomer of the Year: Paulius Murauskas, Arizona State
- Freshman of the Year: Tyran Stokes, Kansas

== Roster ==
2026–27 Kansas State Wildcats men's basketball team
Players
Coaches

Pos.	#	Name	Height	Weight	Year	Previous school	Hometown
G	0	Jaylen Alexander	6 ft 2 in (1.88 m)	185 lb (84 kg)	Fr	Oxford High School	Oxford, AL
G	1	Brandon Rechsteiner	6 ft 1 in (1.85 m)	190 lb (86 kg)	Sr	Etowah High School; Colorado State	Acworth, GA
G	2	Jaden Schutt	6 ft 5 in (1.96 m)	200 lb (91 kg)	Sr	Yorkville Christian; Virginia Tech	Yorkville, IL
F	3	Devin Henderson	6 ft 4 in (1.93 m)	180 lb (82 kg)	Fr	Holy Innocents' Episcopal School	Johns Creek, GA
F	4	Dezdrick Lindsay	6 ft 6 in (1.98 m)	215 lb (98 kg)	Sr	Louisville Male High School; Oregon	Louisville, KY
F	6	Brock Vice	6 ft 10 in (2.08 m)	238 lb (108 kg)	Jr	Houston High School; Murray State	Memphis, TN
F	7	Isaiah Abraham	6 ft 7 in (2.01 m)	205 lb (93 kg)	Jr	Paul VI Catholic High School; Georgetown	Gainesville, VA
G	11	Montana Wheeler	5 ft 10 in (1.78 m)	170 lb (77 kg)	So	Xavier Academy; Bradley	Houston, TX
F	13	Matt Gilhool	6 ft 11 in (2.11 m)	213 lb (97 kg)	So	William Penn Charter School; LSU	Elizabethtown, PA
F	22	Papa N'Diaye	7 ft 0 in (2.13 m)	230 lb (104 kg)	Jr	Trinity International; Xavier	Abidjan, Ivory Coast
F	33	Nash Stark	6 ft 7 in (2.01 m)	230 lb (104 kg)	Fr	Lipscomb Academy	Nashville, TN
C	35	JT Rock	7 ft 1 in (2.16 m)	255 lb (116 kg)	Jr	Lincoln High School; New Mexico	Sioux Falls, SD
G	47	Andrej Kostić	6 ft 6 in (1.98 m)	195 lb (88 kg)	Fr	KK Dynamic	Serbia
F	88	Tomotej Malovec	6 ft 8 in (2.03 m)	214 lb (97 kg)	Jr	KK Mega Basket; Miami (FL)	Ivanka pri Dunaji, Slovakia

Head coach

- Casey Alexander (Belmont)

Assistant coach(es)

- JJ Butler (Chestnut Hill College)
- John Cooper (Wichita State)
- Phil Cunningham (Campbellsville)
- Kerron Johnson (Belmont)
- Luke Smith (Belmont)

Legend

- (C) Team captain
- (S) Suspended
- (I) Ineligible
- (W) Walk-on
- Injured
- Current redshirt

Roster
Last update: June 14, 2026

== Schedule and results ==
Date time, TV	Rank^{#}	Opponent^{#}	Result	Record	High points	High rebounds	High assists	Site (attendance) city, state
Exhibition
October 23, 2026*; 7:00 p.m., ESPN+		Missouri	L 67–71	–	12 – Tied	8 – Rechsteiner	5 – Rechsteiner	Bramlage Coliseum (6,800); Manhattan, KS
October 26, 2026*; 6:30 p.m., B1G+		vs. Nebraska	L 84–88	–	21 – Rechsteiner	7 – Vice	7 – Rechsteiner	Eihusen Arena (5,338); Grand Island, NE
Non-conference regular season
November 3, 2026*; 7:00 p.m., ESPN+		South Dakota State	L 66–68	0–1	18 – N'Diaye	8 – N'Diaye	3 – Rechsteiner	Bramlage Coliseum (7,047); Manhattan, KS
November 6, 2026*; 8:00 p.m., ESPN+		Cal State Northridge	W 95–78	1–1	26 – Rechsteiner	5 – Tied	5 – Rechsteiner	Bramlage Coliseum (7,012); Manhattan, KS
November 10, 2026*; 8:00 p.m., FS1		Creighton	W 89–82	2–1	26 – Rechsteiner	9 – Abraham	6 – Vice	Bramlage Coliseum (6,820); Manhattan, KS
November 16, 2026*; 7:00 p.m., ESPN+		Montana	W 86–45	3–1	16 – Abraham	10 – Vice	5 – Rechsteiner	Bramlage Coliseum (6,046); Manhattan, KS
November 20, 2026*; 7:00 p.m., ESPN+		Campbell	L 70–80	3–2	18 – Rechsteiner	10 – Vice	4 – Tied	Bramlage Coliseum (6,590); Manhattan, KS
November 24, 2026*; 11:30 p.m., ESPN		vs. Gonzaga; Players Era 16 Bracket 2 first round						T-Mobile Arena; Las Vegas, NV
November 26, 2026*; 5:00/10:30 p.m., ESPN Networks		vs. Alabama/Baylor; Players Era 16 Bracket 2						T-Mobile Arena; Las Vegas, NV
November 27, 2026*; TBD, ESPN Networks		vs. TBD; Players Era 16 Bracket 2						T-Mobile Arena; Las Vegas, NV
December 4, 2026*; 6:00 p.m., TruTV		at Seton Hall						Prudential Center; Newark, NJ
December 8, 2026*; 8:00 p.m., ESPN+		IU Indy						Bramlage Coliseum; Manhattan, KS
December 11, 2026*; 7:30 p.m., TNT/TruTV		vs. Wichita State; Wildcat Classic						T-Mobile Center; Kansas City, MO
December 18, 2026*; 7:00 p.m., ESPN+		Little Rock						Bramlage Coliseum; Manhattan, KS
December 21, 2026*; 7:00 p.m., ESPN+		Lindenwood						Bramlage Coliseum; Manhattan, KS
December 28, 2026*; 7:00 p.m., ESPN+		Omaha						Bramlage Coliseum; Manhattan, KS
Big 12 regular season
January 2, 2027; 11:00 a.m., ESPN/ESPN2		at Baylor						Foster Pavilion; Waco, TX
January 5, 2027; 7:30 p.m., FS1		Houston						Bramlage Coliseum; Manhattan, KS
January 9, 2027; 11:00 a.m., CBS		Arizona						Bramlage Coliseum; Manhattan, KS
January 12, 2027; 7:30 p.m., CBSSN		at West Virginia						Hope Coliseum; Morgantown, WV
January 16, 2027; 7:00 p.m., CBSSN		TCU						Bramlage Coliseum; Manhattan, KS
January 19, 2027; 7:00 p.m., CBSSN		at Arizona State						Desert Financial Arena; Tempe, AZ
January 23, 2027; 11:00 a.m./7:00 p.m., FOX		Kansas; Sunflower Showdown Rivalry						Bramlage Coliseum; Manhattan, KS
January 30, 2027; 5:00 p.m., FS1		at Iowa State						Hilton Coliseum; Ames, IA
February 3, 2027; 8:00 p.m., CBSSN		Oklahoma State						Bramlage Coliseum; Manhattan, KS
February 6, 2027; 4:00 p.m., ESPN+		Colorado						Bramlage Coliseum; Manhattan, KS
February 10, 2027; 8:00 p.m., ESPN+		at Utah						Jon M. Huntsman Center; Salt Lake City, UT
February 13, 2027; 2:30 p.m., FOX		at BYU						Marriott Center; Provo, UT
February 16, 2027; 8:00 p.m., CBSSN		Arizona State						Bramlage Coliseum; Manhattan, KS
February 20, 2027; 5:30 p.m., FS1		at Cincinnati						Fifth Third Arena; Cincinnati, OH
February 24, 2027; 6:00 p.m., ESPN2/ESPNU		Texas Tech						Bramlage Coliseum; Manhattan, KS
February 27, 2027; 1:00 p.m., ESPN/ESPN2		at Kansas; Sunflower Showdown Rivalry						Allen Fieldhouse; Lawrence, KS
March 3, 2027; 6:00 p.m., ESPN+		at UCF						Addition Financial Arena; Orlando, FL
March 6, 2027; 4:00 p.m., ESPN+		Cincinnati						Bramlage Coliseum; Manhattan, KS
*Non-conference game. ^{#}Rankings from AP Poll. (#) Tournament seedings in parentheses. All times are in Central Time.
