= 2026–27 Iowa State Cyclones men's basketball team =

American college basketball season

2026–27 Iowa State Cyclones men's basketball
- Conference: Big 12 Conference
- Record: 3–1 (0–0 Big 12)
- Head coach: T. J. Otzelberger (6th season)
- Assistant coaches: Tim Buckley; Erik Crawford; Allan Hanson; Chuck Ruffing; Nate Schmidt
- Home arena: Hilton Coliseum

2026–27 Big 12 men's basketball standings
	Conf.				Overall
Team	W		L	PCT	W		L	PCT
No. 8 Houston	0	–	0	–	6	–	0	1.000
Arizona State	0	–	0	–	5	–	0	1.000
No. 21 BYU	0	–	0	–	5	–	0	1.000
No. 9 Texas Tech	0	–	0	–	5	–	0	1.000
No. 11 Kansas	0	–	0	–	5	–	1	.833
No. 12 Arizona	0	–	0	–	4	–	1	.800
Baylor	0	–	0	–	4	–	1	.800
Cincinnati	0	–	0	–	4	–	1	.800
TCU	0	–	0	–	4	–	1	.800
Iowa State	0	–	0	–	3	–	1	.750
West Virginia	0	–	0	–	4	–	2	.667
UCF	0	–	0	–	4	–	2	.667
Kansas State	0	–	0	–	3	–	2	.600
Oklahoma State	0	–	0	–	3	–	2	.600
Utah	0	–	0	–	3	–	2	.600
Colorado	0	–	0	–	2	–	3	.400
† 2027 Big 12 tournament winner As of November 21, 2026; Rankings from AP poll

The 2026–27 Iowa State Cyclones men's basketball team will represent Iowa State University during the 2026–27 NCAA Division I men's basketball season. The Cyclones will be led by T. J. Otzelberger in his sixth season as head coach. They will play their home games at Hilton Coliseum in Ames, Iowa as members of the Big 12 Conference.

== Previous season ==
The Cyclones finished the 2025–26 season 29–8, 12–6 in Big 12 play to finish in a tie for third place. As the No. 5 seed in the Big 12 tournament, they defeated the No. 12 seed Arizona State and the No. 4 Texas Tech in the second and quarterfinal rounds before losing in the semifinals to No. 2 seed Arizona. They received an at-large bid to the NCAA tournament as the No. 2 seed in the Midwest region. They defeated 15 seed Tennessee State and 7 seed Kentucky before losing to No. 6 seed Tennessee in the Sweet Sixteen.

== Offseason ==
=== Departures ===
Iowa State departures
Name	Number	Pos.	Height	Weight	Year	Hometown	Reason for departure
Nate Heise	0	G	6'5"	212	Graduate student	Lake City, MN	Graduated
Mason Williams	2	G	6'5"	200	Junior	Seattle, WA	Transferred to Seattle
Eric Mulder	4	G	6'9"	218	Senior	Oskaloosa, IA	Graduated
Joshua Jefferson	5	F	6'9"	240	Senior	Las Vegas, NV	Declared for the 2026 NBA Draft, selected 28th overall pick by the Minnesota Timberwolves (traded to Brooklyn Nets).
Dominick Nelson	11	G	6'5"	175	Senior	Miami, FL	Graduated
Cade Kelderman	13	G	6'1"	185	Junior	Waukee, IA	Transferred to South Dakota
Milan Momcilovic	22	F	6'8"	225	Junior	Pewaukee, WI	Transferred to Kentucky

=== Incoming transfers ===
Iowa State incoming transfers
Name	Num	Pos.	Height	Weight	Year	Hometown	Previous school
Tre Singleton	0	F	6'8"	215	Sophomore	Jefferson, IN	Northwestern
Ryan Prather Jr.	3	G	6'5"	205	(redshirt) Senior	Clarksburg, MD	Robert Morris
Leon Bond III	7	G	6'5"	180	(redshirt) Senior	Wauwatosa, WI	Northern Iowa
JaQuan Johnson	11	G	5'11"	195	Junior	Milwaukee, WI	Bradley
Taj Manning	15	F	6'7"	230	(redshirt) Senior	Grandview, MO	Kansas State

== Recruiting ==
=== 2026 recruiting class ===
College recruiting (2026)
Name	Hometown	School	Height	Weight	Commit date
Yusef Gray Jr. #13 SG	West Allis, WI	West Allis Central High School	6 ft 3 in (1.91 m)	175 lb (79 kg)	Jan 19, 2025
Yusef Gray Jr. #13 SG	Recruit ratings: Rivals: 247Sports: ESPN: (82)				
Christian Wiggins; SG	Minneapolis, MN	Wayzata High School	6 ft 4 in (1.93 m)	180 lb (82 kg)	Apr 19, 2025
Christian Wiggins; SG	Recruit ratings: Rivals: 247Sports: ESPN: (80)				
Dorian Rinaldo-Komlan; C	Montauban, France	SPIRE Academy	6 ft 10 in (2.08 m)	215 lb (98 kg)	Nov 10, 2025
Dorian Rinaldo-Komlan; C	Recruit ratings: Rivals: 247Sports: ESPN: (NR)				
Overall recruit ranking: Rivals: 37 247Sports: 30
Note: In many cases, Scout, Rivals, 247Sports, On3, and ESPN may conflict in their listings of height and weight.; In these cases, the average was taken. ESPN grades are on a 100-point scale.; Sources: "2026 Iowa State Basketball Commitments". Rivals.; "2026 Iowa State Cyclones Recruiting Class". Scout.; "2026 Iowa State Basketball Commits". ESPN.; "Scout.com Team Recruiting Rankings". Scout.; "2026 Team Ranking". Rivals.; "2026–27 Iowa State Cyclones men's basketball team". 247Sports.

== Preseason ==
The Big 12 preseason coaches & media poll will be released in October 2026. All awards will be voted on by the league's 16 head coaches, who can not vote for their own team or players.

Big 12 Preseason Coaches Poll

	Big 12 Coaches	Points
1.	Arizona	220 (12)
2.	Houston	214 (4)
3.	Kansas	186
4.	Iowa State	181
5.	Texas Tech	180
6.	BYU	148
7.	TCU	137
T8.	Cincinnati	116
T8.	West Virginia	116
10.	Baylor	102
11.	Oklahoma State	98
12.	Arizona State	75
13.	UCF	55
T14.	Colorado	34
T14.	Kansas State	34
16.	Utah	24
Reference: (#) first-place votes

Big 12 Preseason Media Poll

	Big 12 Coaches
1.	Arizona
2.	Houston
3.	Kansas
4.	Texas Tech
5.	Iowa State
6.	BYU
7.	Baylor
8.	TCU
9.	Cincinnati
10.	West Virginia
11.	Oklahoma State
12.	Arizona State
13.	UCF
14.	Kansas State
15.	Colorado
16.	Utah

All-Big 12 Preseason First team

Player	School	Pos.	Yr.	Ht., Wt.	Hometown (Last School)
Ivan Kharchenkov	Arizona	F	So.	6'7", 230	Munich, Germany (Bayern Munich)
Motiejus Krivas	Arizona	C	Jr.	7'2", 260	Siauliai, Lithuania (BC Žalgiris)
Paulius Murauskas	Arizona State	F	Sr.	6'8", 235	Kaunas, Lithuania (St. Mary's)
Robert Wright III†	BYU	G	Jr.	6'1", 183	Wilmington, DE (Baylor)
Dedan Thomas Jr.	Houston	G	Sr.	6'1", 180	Las Vegas, NV (LSU)
Joseph Tugler	Houston	F	Sr.	6'8", 230	Houston, TX (Cypress Falls HS)
Tamin Lipsey	Iowa State	G	GS	6'1", 200	Ames, IA (Ames HS)
Tyran Stokes	Kansas	G	Fr.	6'7", 230	Louisville, KY (Rainer Beach HS)
Xavier Edmonds	TCU	F	Sr.	6'8", 252	Long Beach, CA (Salt Lake CC)
JT Toppin†	Texas Tech	F	Sr.	6'9", 230	Dallas, TX (New Mexico)
† denotes unanimous selection Reference:

- Player of the Year: Motiejus Krivas, Arizona
- Co-Newcomer of the Year: Paulius Murauskas, Arizona State
- Freshman of the Year: Tyran Stokes, Kansas

== Roster ==
2026–27 Iowa State Cyclones men's basketball team
Players
Coaches

Pos.	#	Name	Height	Weight	Year	Previous school	Hometown
F	0	Tre Singleton	6 ft 8 in (2.03 m)	220 lb (100 kg)	So	Northwestern	Jeffersonville, Indiana
G	1	Jamarion Batemon	6 ft 3 in (1.91 m)	190 lb (86 kg)	So	Milwaukee Academy of Science	Milwaukee, Wisconsin
F	2	Xzavion Mitchell	6 ft 6 in (1.98 m)	215 lb (98 kg)	So	North HS	Oshkosh, Wisconsin
G	3	Tamin Lipsey	6 ft 1 in (1.85 m)	200 lb (91 kg)	GS	Ames High School	Ames, Iowa
G	4	Ryan Prather Jr.	6 ft 4 in (1.93 m)	221 lb (100 kg)	GS	Robert Morris	Clarksburg, Maryland
G	5	Yusef Gray Jr.	6 ft 4 in (1.93 m)	182 lb (83 kg)	Fr	West Allis Central HS	Milwaukee, Wisconsin
G	7	Leon Bond III	6 ft 5 in (1.96 m)	196 lb (89 kg)	GS	Northern Iowa	Wauwatosa, Wisconsin
G	9	Anthony Rise (W)	6 ft 0 in (1.83 m)	174 lb (79 kg)	So	Brookfield Central	Milwaukee, Wisconsin
G	11	Jaquan Johnson	5 ft 11 in (1.8 m)	216 lb (98 kg)	Jr	Bradley	Milwaukee, Wisconsin
F	15	Taj Manning	6 ft 7 in (2.01 m)	225 lb (102 kg)	GS	Kansas State	Grandview, Missouri
F	21	Dominykas Pleta	6 ft 11 in (2.11 m)	240 lb (109 kg)	So	Arnoldi Gymnasium	Gotha, Germany
G	22	Christian Wiggins	6 ft 5 in (1.96 m)	190 lb (86 kg)	Fr	Wayzata HS	Plymouth, Minnesota
F	23	Blake Buchanan	6 ft 10 in (2.08 m)	230 lb (104 kg)	Sr	Virginia	Coeur d'Alene, Idaho
F	24	Dorian Rinaldo-Komlan	6 ft 9 in (2.06 m)	214 lb (97 kg)	Fr	SPIRE Academy	Montauban, France
G	27	Killyan Toure	6 ft 3 in (1.91 m)	205 lb (93 kg)	So	Brewster Academy	Pamiers, France

Head coach

- T. J. Otzelberger (UW–Whitewater)

Assistant coach(es)

- Tim Buckley (Bemidji State)
- Erik Crawford (Northern Iowa)
- Allan Hanson (Milwaukee)
- Chuck Ruffing (Marian)
- Nate Schmidt (Denison)

Legend

- (C) Team captain
- (S) Suspended
- (I) Ineligible
- (W) Walk-on
- Injured
- Current redshirt

Roster
Last update: July 31, 2026

== Schedule and results ==
Date time, TV	Rank^{#}	Opponent^{#}	Result	Record	High points	High rebounds	High assists	Site (attendance) city, state
Exhibition
October 18, 2026*; 2:00 p.m., ESPN+		Creighton	L 80–83	—	15 – Batemon	7 – Pleta	7 – Johnson	Hilton Coliseum (13,601); Ames, IA
October 25, 2026*; 12:00 p.m., B1G+	No. 18	at Northwestern	W 94–59	0—1	25 – Prather Jr.	10 – Buchanan	7 – Lipsey	Welsh–Ryan Arena; Evanston, IL
Non-conference Regular season
November 2, 2026*; 6:00 p.m., FS1	No. 18	vs. Memphis	L 76–80	0—1	19 – Prather	9 – Singleton	3 – Johnson	Sanford Pentagon (3,458); Sioux Falls, SD
November 6, 2026*; 7:00 p.m., ESPN+	No. 18	Southern Miss	W 83–57	1—1	28 – Singleton	9 – Singleton	4 – Johnson	Hilton Coliseum (13,930); Ames, IA
November 10, 2026*; 7:00 p.m., ESPN+		Southern	W 87–47	2–1	19 – Singleton	8 – Batemon	6 – Batemon	Hilton Coliseum (13,503); Ames, IA
November 15, 2026*; 12:00 p.m., ESPN2		Niagara	W 66–45	3–1	13 – Singleton	10 – Pleta	5 – Lipsey	Hilton Coliseum (13,787); Ames, IA
November 24, 2026*; 4:30 p.m., ESPNU		vs. San Diego State; Players Era Festival 16 – Bracket 1 First round						Michelob Ultra Arena; Paradise, NV
November 26, 2026*; 12:30/8:00 p.m., ESPN Network		vs. Tennessee/Maryland; Players Era Festival 16						Michelob Ultra Arena; Paradise, NV
November 27, 2026*; TBA, ESPN Network		vs. Louisville/Texas Tech/St. John's/Oregon; Players Era Festival 16						MGM Grand Garden Arena; Paradise, NV
December 1, 2026*; 7:00 p.m., ESPN+		Alcorn State						Hilton Coliseum; Ames, IA
December 5, 2026*; 7:00 p.m., ESPN		Purdue						Hilton Coliseum; Ames, IA
December 10, 2026*; 6:00 p.m., FS1		at Iowa; Rivalry/Iowa Corn Cy-Hawk Series						Carver–Hawkeye Arena; Iowa City, IA
December 13, 2026*; 5:00 p.m., ESPN+		North Carolina Central						Hilton Coliseum; Ames, IA
December 18, 2026*; 8:30 p.m., CBSSN		vs. Missouri State; NABC Hall of Fame Classic						T-Mobile Center; Kansas City, MO
December 21, 2026*; 5:00 p.m., ESPN+		Northern Arizona						Hilton Coliseum; Ames, IA
December 29, 2026*; 7:00 p.m., CBSSN		New Hampshire						Hilton Coliseum; Ames, IA
Big 12
January 2, 2027; 7:00 p.m., ESPN		Arizona						Hilton Coliseum; Ames, IA
January 5, 2027; 10:00 p.m., ESPN/ESPN2		at Colorado						CU Events Center; Boulder, CO
January 9, 2027; 1:00 p.m., FOX		Oklahoma State						Hilton Coliseum; Ames, IA
January 13, 2027; 8:00 p.m., Peacock		at Houston						Fertitta Center; Houston, TX
January 16, 2027; 7:00 p.m., ESPN/ESPN2		at Texas Tech						United Supermarkets Arena; Lubbock, TX
January 20, 2027; 8:00 p.m., FS1		BYU						Hilton Coliseum; Ames, IA
January 23, 2027; 1:00 p.m., ESPN/ESPN2/ESPNU		at UCF						Addition Financial Arena; Orlando, FL
January 30, 2027; 5:00 p.m., FS1		Kansas State						Hilton Coliseum; Ames, IA
February 2, 2027; 8:30 p.m., TNT/TruTV		Utah						Hilton Coliseum; Ames, IA
February 6, 2027; 11:45 a.m., CBS		at West Virginia						Hope Coliseum; Morgantown, WV
February 10, 2027; 8:00 p.m., ESPN2/ESPNU		at Oklahoma State						Gallagher-Iba Arena; Stillwater, OK
February 13, 2027; 1:00 p.m., ESPN/ESPN2		Kansas						Hilton Coliseum; Ames, IA
February 16, 2027; 7:00 p.m., Peacock		Cincinnati						Hilton Coliseum; Ames, IA
February 19, 2027; 9:00 p.m., FS1		at Arizona State						Desert Financial Arena; Tempe, AZ
February 23, 2027; 8:00 p.m., ESPN/ESPN2		at Baylor						Foster Pavilion; Waco, TX
February 27, 2027; 4:30 p.m., FOX		TCU						Hilton Coliseum; Ames, IA
March 1, 2027; 8:00 p.m., ESPN		at Kansas						Allen Fieldhouse; Lawrence, KS
March 6, 2027; 2:00 p.m., FOX		West Virginia						Hilton Coliseum; Ames, IA
Big 12 Tournament
March 9–13, 2027		vs.						T-Mobile Center; Kansas City, MO
*Non-conference game. ^{#}Rankings from AP poll. (#) Tournament seedings in parentheses. All times are in Central Time.

== Rankings ==
Ranking movements Legend: ██ Increase in ranking ██ Decrease in ranking RV = Received votes т = Tied with team above or below
	Week																				
Poll	Pre	1	2	3	4	5	6	7	8	9	10	11	12	13	14	15	16	17	18	19	Final
AP	18	RV	RV																		
Coaches	14т	23	RV																		
