= 2026–27 Colorado Buffaloes men's basketball team =

Colorado Basketball team

2026–27 Colorado Buffaloes men's basketball
- Conference: Big 12 Conference
- Record: 2–3 (0–0 Big 12)
- Head coach: Tad Boyle (17th season)
- Assistant coaches: Bill Grier; Danny Manning; Nate Tomlinson; Evan Battey; Tyson Gilbert
- Home arena: CU Events Center

2026–27 Big 12 men's basketball standings
	Conf.				Overall
Team	W		L	PCT	W		L	PCT
Arizona State	0	–	0	–	5	–	0	1.000
No. 21 BYU	0	–	0	–	5	–	0	1.000
No. 8 Houston	0	–	0	–	5	–	0	1.000
No. 11 Kansas	0	–	0	–	5	–	0	1.000
No. 9 Texas Tech	0	–	0	–	5	–	0	1.000
TCU	0	–	0	–	4	–	0	1.000
No. 12 Arizona	0	–	0	–	4	–	1	.800
Baylor	0	–	0	–	4	–	1	.800
Cincinnati	0	–	0	–	4	–	1	.800
UCF	0	–	0	–	4	–	1	.800
West Virginia	0	–	0	–	4	–	1	.800
Iowa State	0	–	0	–	3	–	1	.750
Kansas State	0	–	0	–	3	–	1	.750
Oklahoma State	0	–	0	–	3	–	1	.750
Utah	0	–	0	–	3	–	1	.750
Colorado	0	–	0	–	2	–	3	.400
† 2027 Big 12 tournament winner As of November 19, 2026; Rankings from AP poll

The 2026–27 Colorado Buffaloes men's basketball team will represent the University of Colorado Boulder in the 2026–27 NCAA Division I men's basketball season. They will be led by head coach Tad Boyle in his seventeenth season at Colorado. The Buffaloes play their home games at CU Events Center in Boulder, Colorado as members of the Big 12 Conference.

== Previous season ==
The Buffaloes finished the 2025–26 season 17–16, 7–11 in Big 12 play to finish tied for eleventh place. They were defeated by Oklahoma State in the first round of the Big 12 tournament. They received a bid to the College Basketball Crown tournament. They were defeated by Oklahoma in the quarterfinals.

== Off-season ==
=== Departures ===
Name	Pos.	Height	Weight	Year	Hometown	Reason for departure
Isaiah Johnson	G	6'1"	170	Fr	Valley Village, CA	Transferred to Texas
Bangot Dak	F	6'11"	185	Jr	Lincoln, NE	Transferred to Vanderbilt
Sebastian Rancik	F	6'9"	210	So	Bratislava, Slovakia	Transferred to Florida State
Fawaz Ifaola	C	7'0"	245	Fr	Lagos, Nigeria	Transferred to Florida Atlantic
Felix Kossaras	G	6'5"	192	So	Montreal, Canada	Transferred to George Washington
Andrew Crawford	G	6'8"	190	RS Fr	Littleton, CO	Transferred to Northern Colorado
Alon Michaeli	F	6'9"	229	Fr	Kfar Saba, Israel	Transferred to Saint Louis
Jon Mani	G	6'5"	175	So	Los Angeles, CA	Transferred to UNC Greensboro
Leonardo Van Elswyk	C	7'1"	245	Fr	Milan, Italy	Transferred to Stony Brook

=== Incoming transfers ===
Name	Num	Pos.	Height	Weight	Year	Hometown	Previous school
David Gomez	6	F	6'8"	235	So	Alcalá de Guadaira, Spain	Charlotte
Justin Neely	12	F	6'6"	220	GS	Miami Beach, FL	UNC Greensboro
Noah Feddersen	34	C	6'10"	245	Sr	Menomonie, WI	North Dakota State

=== 2026 Recruiting class ===
College recruiting
Name	Hometown	School	Height	Weight	Commit date
Alex Dickeson; G	Adelaide, Australia	Center For Excellence	6 ft 4 in (1.93 m)	N/A	Mar 25, 2026
Alex Dickeson; G	Recruit ratings: No ratings found				
Amir Jones; G	Studio City, CA	Harvard-Westlake High School	6 ft 3 in (1.91 m)	180 lb (82 kg)	May 21, 2026
Amir Jones; G	Recruit ratings: No ratings found				
Goc Malual; F	Sydney, Australia	Sydney Kings	6 ft 8 in (2.03 m)	210 lb (95 kg)	Mar 23, 2026
Goc Malual; F	Recruit ratings: No ratings found				
Luke Mirhashemi; G	Newport Beach, CA	Corona del Mar High School	6 ft 5 in (1.96 m)	N/A	May 9, 2026
Luke Mirhashemi; G	Recruit ratings: No ratings found				
Rider Portela; G	Phoenix, AZ	Sunnyslope High School	6 ft 6 in (1.98 m)	175 lb (79 kg)	Sep 14, 2025
Rider Portela; G	Recruit ratings: Rivals: 247Sports:				
Chase Hill; F	San Antonio, TX	TMI Episcopal	6 ft 7 in (2.01 m)	N/A	May 18, 2026
Chase Hill; F	Recruit ratings: No ratings found				
Eric Jacobsen; C	Colorado Springs, CO	Brewster Academy	6 ft 11 in (2.11 m)	230 lb (100 kg)	Jun 3, 2026
Eric Jacobsen; C	Recruit ratings: Rivals:				
Overall recruit ranking:
Note: In many cases, Scout, Rivals, 247Sports, On3, and ESPN may conflict in their listings of height and weight.; In these cases, the average was taken. ESPN grades are on a 100-point scale.; Sources: "Colorado Commits". Rivals.; "ESPN- Colorado Buffaloes Men's Basketball Recruiting". ESPN.; "2026 Team Ranking". Rivals.

== Preseason ==
The Big 12 preseason coaches & media poll will be released in October 2026. All awards will be voted on by the league's 16 head coaches, who can not vote for their own team or players.

Big 12 Preseason Coaches Poll

	Big 12 Coaches	Points
1.	Arizona	220 (12)
2.	Houston	214 (4)
3.	Kansas	186
4.	Iowa State	181
5.	Texas Tech	180
6.	BYU	148
7.	TCU	137
T8.	Cincinnati	116
T8.	West Virginia	116
10.	Baylor	102
11.	Oklahoma State	98
12.	Arizona State	75
13.	UCF	55
T14.	Colorado	34
T14.	Kansas State	34
16.	Utah	24
Reference: (#) first-place votes

Big 12 Preseason Media Poll

	Big 12 Coaches
1.	Arizona
2.	Houston
3.	Kansas
4.	Texas Tech
5.	Iowa State
6.	BYU
7.	Baylor
8.	TCU
9.	Cincinnati
10.	West Virginia
11.	Oklahoma State
12.	Arizona State
13.	UCF
14.	Kansas State
15.	Colorado
16.	Utah

All-Big 12 Preseason First team

Player	School	Pos.	Yr.	Ht., Wt.	Hometown (Last School)
Ivan Kharchenkov	Arizona	F	So.	6'7", 230	Munich, Germany (Bayern Munich)
Motiejus Krivas	Arizona	C	Jr.	7'2", 260	Siauliai, Lithuania (BC Žalgiris)
Paulius Murauskas	Arizona State	F	Sr.	6'8", 235	Kaunas, Lithuania (St. Mary's)
Robert Wright III†	BYU	G	Jr.	6'1", 183	Wilmington, DE (Baylor)
Dedan Thomas Jr.	Houston	G	Sr.	6'1", 180	Las Vegas, NV (LSU)
Joseph Tugler	Houston	F	Sr.	6'8", 230	Houston, TX (Cypress Falls HS)
Tamin Lipsey	Iowa State	G	GS	6'1", 200	Ames, IA (Ames HS)
Tyran Stokes	Kansas	G	Fr.	6'7", 230	Louisville, KY (Rainer Beach HS)
Xavier Edmonds	TCU	F	Sr.	6'8", 252	Long Beach, CA (Salt Lake CC)
JT Toppin†	Texas Tech	F	Sr.	6'9", 230	Dallas, TX (New Mexico)
† denotes unanimous selection Reference:

- Player of the Year: Motiejus Krivas, Arizona
- Co-Newcomer of the Year: Paulius Murauskas, Arizona State
- Freshman of the Year: Tyran Stokes, Kansas

== Roster ==
2026–27 Colorado Buffaloes men's basketball team
Players
Coaches

Pos.	#	Name	Height	Weight	Year	Previous school	Hometown
G/F	0	Ian Inman	6 ft 6 in (1.98 m)	200 lb (91 kg)	So	College Park HS	Houston, TX
G	1	Alex Dickeson	6 ft 4 in (1.93 m)	—	Fr	Center For Excellence	Adelaide, Australia
G	3	Amir Jones	6 ft 3 in (1.91 m)	—	Fr	Harvard-Westlake HS	Studio City, CA
G	5	Josiah Sanders	6 ft 5 in (1.96 m)	210 lb (95 kg)	So	Colorado Prep	Denver, CO
F	6	David Gomez	6 ft 8 in (2.03 m)	—	So	Hestia Menorca; Charlotte	Alcala de Guadaira, Spain
F	8	Goc Malual	6 ft 8 in (2.03 m)	—	Fr	Sydney Kings	Sydney, Australia
G	11	Jalin Holland	6 ft 5 in (1.96 m)	200 lb (91 kg)	So	Dream City Christian (Ariz.)	Los Lunas, NM
F	12	Justin Neely	6 ft 6 in (1.98 m)	220 lb (100 kg)	GS	West Oaks Academy; UAlbany; UNC Greensboro	Miami Beach, FL
G	13	Luke Mirhashemi	6 ft 5 in (1.96 m)	—	Fr	Corona del Mar HS	Newport Beach, CA
G	15	Rider Portela	6 ft 6 in (1.98 m)	175 lb (79 kg)	Fr	Sunnyslope HS	Phoenix, AZ
F	23	Chase Hill	6 ft 7 in (2.01 m)	—	Fr	TMI Episcopal	San Antonio, TX
G	24	Barrington Hargress	6 ft 1 in (1.85 m)	190 lb (86 kg)	Sr	Heritage Christian School (Calif.); UC Riverside	Inglewood, CA
C	32	Eric Jacobsen	6 ft 11 in (2.11 m)	230 lb (104 kg)	Fr	Brewster Academy (N.H.)	Colorado Springs, CO
C	34	Noah Feddersen	6 ft 10 in (2.08 m)	245 lb (111 kg)	Sr	Menomonie HS; North Dakota State	Menomonie, WI
F	41	Nick Randall	6 ft 8 in (2.03 m)	195 lb (88 kg)	RS Jr	Fossil Ridge HS (Colo.)	Fort Collins, CO

Head coach

- Tad Boyle (Kansas)

Assistant coach(es)

- Bill Grier (Oregon)
- Danny Manning (Kansas)
- Nate Tomlinson (Colorado)
- Evan Battey (Colorado)
- Tyson Gilbert (Alaska–Anchorage)

Legend

- (C) Team captain
- (S) Suspended
- (I) Ineligible
- (W) Walk-on
- Injured
- Current redshirt

Roster
Last update: June 26, 2026

== Schedule and results ==
Date time, TV	Rank^{#}	Opponent^{#}	Result	Record	High points	High rebounds	High assists	Site (attendance) city, state
Exhibition
October 18, 2026; 1:00 p.m., ESPN+		Abilene Christian; Mile High Hoops Classic	W 67–64		15 – Dickenson	9 – Neely	6 – Neely	Auraria Event Center (658); Denver, CO
Non-conference regular season
November 2, 2026; 7:00 p.m., ESPN+		Abilene Christian	W 94–59	1–0	18 – Holland	6 – Holland	4 – Hargress	CU Events Center (4,420); Boulder, CO
November 7, 2026; 1:30 p.m., USA		vs. San Diego State; Bill Walton Classic	L 66–77	1–1	33 – Hargress	5 – Feddersen	2 – Hargress	Pechanga Arena (3,432); San Diego, CA
November 10, 2026; 7:00 p.m., ESPN+		San Diego	W 83–75	2–1	26 – Inman	10 – Dickeson	8 – Hargress	CU Events Center (4,324); Boulder, CO
November 14, 2026; 4:00 p.m., NBCSN/Peacock		at Providence	L 53–67	2–2	18 – Hargress	7 – Feddersen	4 – Hargress	Amica Mutual Pavilion (12,400); Providence, RI
November 18, 2026; 7:00 p.m., ESPN+		Portland	L 74–77	2–3	27 – Neely	9 – Neely	4 – Hargress	CU Events Center (4,382); Boulder, CO
November 24, 2026; 10:00 p.m., CBSSN		vs. Stanford; Acrisure Series Pod 2 semifinals						Acrisure Arena; Thousand Palms, CA
November 25, 2026; TBA, TBA		vs. Grand Canyon/Saint Louis; Acrisure Series Pod 2						Acrisure Arena; Thousand Palms, CA
December 1, 2026; 7:00 p.m., ESPN+		UTEP						CU Events Center; Boulder, CO
December 5, 2026; 8:00 p.m., TNT/TruTV		Colorado State						CU Events Center; Boulder, CO
December 12, 2026; 7:00 p.m., ESPN+		Central Arkansas						CU Events Center; Boulder, CO
December 15, 2026; 7:00 p.m., ESPN+		Cal Poly						CU Events Center; Boulder, CO
December 19, 2026; 3:30 p.m., FS1		vs. Purdue; Indy Classic						Gainbridge Fieldhouse; Indianapolis, IN
December 22, 2026; 1:00 p.m., ESPN+		North Dakota						CU Events Center; Boulder, CO
December 29, 2026; 6:00 p.m., ESPN+		Denver						CU Events Center; Boulder, CO
Big 12 regular season
January 2, 2027; 6:00 p.m., CBSSN		at Oklahoma State						Gallagher-Iba Arena; Stillwater, OK
January 5, 2027; 9:00 p.m., ESPN/ESPN2		Iowa State						CU Events Center; Boulder, CO
January 9, 2027; 1:00 p.m., ESPN+		West Virginia						CU Events Center; Boulder, CO
January 13, 2027; 7:00 p.m., ESPN2/ESPNU		at Kansas						Allen Fieldhouse; Lawrence, KS
January 16, 2027; 6:00 p.m., ESPN/ESPN2		Houston						CU Events Center; Boulder, CO
January 19, 2027; 5:00 p.m., ESPN+		at UCF						Addition Financial Arena; Orlando, FL
January 23, 2027; 1:00 p.m., ESPN+		Cincinnati						CU Events Center; Boulder, CO
January 27, 2027; 6:00 p.m., CBSSN		at Baylor						Foster Pavilion; Waco, TX
January 30, 2027; 3:00 p.m., ESPN+		at TCU						Schollmaier Arena; Fort Worth, TX
February 2, 2027; 9:00 p.m., ESPN		Texas Tech						CU Events Center; Boulder, CO
February 6, 2027; 3:00 p.m., ESPN+		at Kansas State						Bramlage Coliseum; Manhattan, KS
February 13, 2027; 1:00 p.m., ESPN+		Baylor						CU Events Center; Boulder, CO
February 17, 2027; 7:00 p.m., Peacock		BYU						CU Events Center; Boulder, CO
February 20, 2027; 5:00 p.m., ESPN+		Utah; Rivalry						CU Events Center; Boulder, CO
February 24, 2027; 7:00 p.m., ESPN2/ESPNU		at Houston						Fertitta Center; Houston, TX
February 27, 2027; 3:00 p.m., TNT/TruTV		Arizona State						CU Events Center; Boulder, CO
March 3, 2027; 7:00 p.m., FS1		at Arizona						McKale Center; Tucson, AZ
March 6, 2027; 1:00 p.m., ESPN+		at Utah; Rivalry						Jon M. Huntsman Center; Salt Lake City, UT
Big 12 Tournament
		vs.						
*Non-conference game. ^{#}Rankings from AP Poll. (#) Tournament seedings in parentheses. All times are in Mountain Time. Source
