= 2026 Maui Invitational =

Early-season American college basketball tournament

2026 Maui Invitational Tournament
- Season: 2026–27
- Teams: 8
- Finals site: Lahaina Civic Center, Lahaina, Hawaii

The 2026 Maui Invitational Tournament, sponsored as the Southwest Maui Invitational, is an early-season college basketball tournament that will be the 42nd edition of the tournament as part of the 2026–27 NCAA Division I men's basketball season.

== Teams ==
| Team | Most Recent Appearance | Best Finish |
|---|---|---|
| Arizona | 2022 | Champion (2014, 2000, 2022) |
| BYU | 2019 | Runner-Up (1992) |
| Clemson | first appearance | – |
| Colorado State | first appearance | – |
| Ole Miss | first appearance | – |
| Providence | 2020 | Champion (1984) |
| VCU | 2017 | 6th (1986, 2017) |
| Washington | 2010 | 4th (2010) |

== Bracket ==
5th Place Game; Wednesday, November 25
5:00 p.m.
ESPN2
7th Place Game
7:30 p.m.
ESPN2

Consolation 2nd Round; Tuesday, November 24
3:00 p.m.
ESPNU
5:30 p.m.
ESPNU

First Round; Monday, November 23
Ole Miss | 9:30 a.m.
Clemson | ESPN2
Washington | 12:00 p.m.
BYU | ESPN2
VCU | 4:00 p.m.
Providence | ESPNU
Colorado State | 6:30 p.m.
Arizona | ESPN2

Semifinals; Tuesday, November 24
9:30 a.m.
ESPN/ESPN2
12:00 p.m.
ESPN2

Championship; Wednesday, November 25
9:30 a.m.
ESPN
3rd Place Game
12:30 p.m.
ESPN2

Note: Game Times are listed in Hawaiian time
