= 2026–27 VCU Rams men's basketball team =

American college basketball season

2026–27 VCU Rams men's basketball
- Conference: Atlantic 10 Conference
- Record: 3–1 (0–0 A-10)
- Head coach: Phil Martelli Jr. (2nd season)
- Associate head coach: Jimmy Martelli (2nd season)
- Assistant coaches: Chris Cole (2nd season); Dwayne Lee (1st season); Brett Nelson (2nd season); Brandon Rozzell (2nd season)
- Home arena: Stuart C. Siegel Center

2026–27 Atlantic 10 men's basketball standings
	Conf.				Overall
Team	W		L	PCT	W		L	PCT
Duquesne	0	–	0	–	5	–	0	1.000
George Washington	0	–	0	–	5	–	0	1.000
Rhode Island	0	–	0	–	5	–	0	1.000
Saint Joseph's	0	–	0	–	5	–	0	1.000
Fordham	0	–	0	–	4	–	1	.800
George Mason	0	–	0	–	4	–	1	.800
St. Bonaventure	0	–	0	–	4	–	1	.800
Saint Louis	0	–	0	–	3	–	1	.750
VCU	0	–	0	–	3	–	1	.750
Davidson	0	–	0	–	3	–	2	.600
Loyola Chicago	0	–	0	–	3	–	2	.600
Richmond	0	–	0	–	3	–	2	.600
Dayton	0	–	0	–	2	–	3	.400
La Salle	0	–	0	–	2	–	3	.400
† 2027 A-10 tournament winner As of November 20, 2026; Rankings from AP poll

The 2026–27 VCU Rams men's basketball team will represent Virginia Commonwealth University during the 2026–27 NCAA Division I men's basketball season. The Rams, will be led by second-year head coach Phil Martelli Jr., and play their home games at the Siegel Center in Richmond, Virginia, as a member of the Atlantic 10 Conference.

== Previous season ==
The 2025–26 team finished the regular season as Atlantic 10 regular season co-champions with Saint Louis, and successfully defending their tournament title, beating Dayton in the championship. It was the first time in program history VCU won the Atlantic 10 men's basketball tournament in consecutive years and it was their third tournament title in the past four seasons, each one being under a different head coach. It was also VCU's first time since 1981 winning back-to-back conference tournaments.

In the 2026 NCAA Division I men's basketball tournament, the 11-seed VCU defeated the 6-seed North Carolina, 82–78 in overtime. VCU overcame a 19-point deficit to win the game, making it the sixth largest comeback in NCAA tournament history, and the largest first round comeback in NCAA tournament history. The win was VCU's first NCAA tournament win since 2016. In the second round, VCU lost to eventual Final Four team, Illinois.

VCU finished with a 28–8 overall record and a 15–3 conference record. Following the season, Martinelli Jr. signed a contract extension through the 2030–31 season.

== Offseason ==
=== Departures ===
VCU departures
Name	Number	Pos.	Height	Weight	Year	Hometown	Reason for departure
Jadrian Tracey	2	SG	6 ft 6 in (1.98 m)	210 pounds (95 kg)	RS Senior	Fort Myers, FL	Graduated
Barry Evans	5	SF	6 ft 8 in (2.03 m)	215 pounds (98 kg)	Senior	Baltimore, MD	Graduated

==== Outgoing transfers ====
Outgoing transfers
Name	Number	Pos.	Height	Weight	Hometown	Year	New school
Terrence Hill Jr.	6	G	6 ft 3 in (191 cm)	180 lb (82 kg)	Portland, OR	Jr.	Tennessee
Obi Okafor	7	F	6 ft 9 in (206 cm)	215 lb (98 kg)	Hampton, VA	RS Jr.	Point Park
Jordann Dumont	10	F	6 ft 8 in (203 cm)	220 lb (100 kg)	Montreal, QC	Jr.	Tulane
Christian Fermin	21	F	6 ft 10 in (2.08 m)	225 pounds (102 kg)	Tobyhanna, PA	Gr.	Tennessee
Keyshawn Mitchell	22	F	6 ft 11 in (2.11 m)	215 pounds (98 kg)	Brooklyn, NY	Sr.	Iona

=== Incoming transfers ===
VCU incoming transfers
Name	Number	Pos.	Height	Weight	Year	Hometown	Previous School
Blake Harper	1	G	6 ft 7 in (201 cm)	220 lb (100 kg)	Jr.	Washington, DC	Creighton
Torey Alston	10	F	6 ft 9 in (206 cm)	215 lb (98 kg)	Jr.	Durham, NC	Middle Tennessee
Nyle Ralph-Beyer	22	G	6 ft 4 in (193 cm)	180 lb (82 kg)	Jr.	West Chester, PA	Sacred Heart
Joshua Wyche	23	UTL	6 ft 7 in (201 cm)	215 lb (98 kg)	RS Jr.	Philadelphia, PA	Lafayette

=== 2026 recruits ===
The following players have committed to playing for VCU.

College recruiting
Name	Hometown	School	Height	Weight	Commit date
Sammy Jackson; G	Odessa, FL	Roman Catholic (PA)	6 ft 8 in (2.03 m)	210 lb (95 kg)	Jun 25, 2025
Sammy Jackson; G	Recruit ratings: Scout: Rivals: 247Sports: ESPN: (83)				
Collin Ross; C	Atlanta, GA	SPIRE Academy	6 ft 9 in (2.06 m)	200 lb (91 kg)	Sep 1, 2025
Collin Ross; C	Recruit ratings: Scout: Rivals: 247Sports: ESPN: (80)				
Stefan Plisnic; C	Belgrade, SER	IMG Academy	6 ft 10 in (2.08 m)	225 lb (102 kg)	Nov 8, 2023
Stefan Plisnic; C	Recruit ratings: Scout: Rivals: 247Sports: ESPN: (75)				
Overall recruit ranking:
Note: In many cases, Scout, Rivals, 247Sports, On3, and ESPN may conflict in their listings of height and weight.; In these cases, the average was taken. ESPN grades are on a 100-point scale.; Sources: "VCU 2026 Player Commits". ESPN.; "2026 Team Ranking". Rivals.

== Roster ==
2026–27 VCU Rams men's basketball team
Players
Coaches

Pos.	#	Name	Height	Weight	Year	Previous school	Hometown
G	0	Brandon Jennings	6 ft 4 in (1.93 m)	180 lb (82 kg)	Jr	St. Christopher School	Richmond, VA
G	2	Sammy Jackson	6 ft 8 in (2.03 m)	210 lb (95 kg)	Fr	Roman Catholic (PA)	Odessa, FL
G	4	Ahmad Nowell	6 ft 1 in (1.85 m)	190 lb (86 kg)	Jr	UConn	Philadelphia, PA
G	5	Nyk Lewis	6 ft 1 in (1.85 m)	195 lb (88 kg)	So	Gonzaga College	Washington, DC
F	7	Collin Ross	6 ft 11 in (2.11 m)	205 lb (93 kg)	Fr	SPIRE Academy	Atlanta, GA
G/F	8	Michael Belle	6 ft 8 in (2.03 m)	220 lb (100 kg)	Sr	Strasbourg	London, ENG
F	9	Stefan Plisnic	6 ft 10 in (2.08 m)	225 lb (102 kg)	Fr	IMG Academy	Belgrade, SER
F	10	Torey Alston	6 ft 9 in (2.06 m)	215 lb (98 kg)	Jr	Middle Tennessee	Durham, NC
G	14	Jordan Tillery	6 ft 5 in (1.96 m)	190 lb (86 kg)	So	IMG Academy	Orlando, FL
G	15	Tyrell Ward	6 ft 6 in (1.98 m)	185 lb (84 kg)	Sr	LSU	Washington, D.C.
F	17	Lazar Đoković	6 ft 11 in (2.11 m)	235 lb (107 kg)	Sr	Charleston	Gornji Milanovac, SER
G	22	Nyle Ralph-Beyer	6 ft 4 in (1.93 m)	180 lb (82 kg)	Jr	Sacred Heart	West Chester, PA
G/F	23	Joshua Wyche	6 ft 7 in (2.01 m)	215 lb (98 kg)	RS Jr	Lafayette	Philadelphia, PA

Head coach

- Phil Martelli Jr. (Saint Joseph's)

Assistant coach(es)

- Jimmy Martelli (Dickinson)
- Chris Cole (Cal State Dominguez Hills)
- Dwayne Lee (Saint Joseph's)
- Brett Nelson (Florida)
- Brandon Rozzell (VCU)

Legend

- (C) Team captain
- (S) Suspended
- (I) Ineligible
- (W) Walk-on
- Injured
- Current redshirt

Roster

== Schedule and results ==
Date time, TV	Rank^{#}	Opponent^{#}	Result	Record	High points	High rebounds	High assists	Site (attendance) city, state
Exhibitions
October 10, 2026*; 1:00 p.m.		Wichita State	W 94–90		–	–	–	Siegel Center (0); Richmond, Virginia
October 17, 2026*; 7:00 p.m.		at Old Dominion; Rivalry	W 71–57		22 – Đoković	5 – Tied	2 – Tied	Chartway Arena (3,478); Norfolk, VA
October 25, 2026*; 2:00 p.m.		James Madison	W 92–87		30 – Harper	9 – Harper	3 – Alston	Siegel Center (5,969); Richmond, VA
Non-conference regular season
November 2, 2026*; 7:00 p.m., WUPV/ESPN+		Little Rock	W 82–72	1–0	17 – Alston	12 – Alston	5 – Lewis	Siegel Center (7,637); Richmond, VA
November 7, 2026*; 3:00 p.m., ESPN+		at Memphis	L 88–89	1–1	22 – Harper	7 – Nowell	7 – Lewis	FedEx Forum (10,312); Memphis, TN
November 11, 2026*; 7:00 p.m., MASN/ESPN+		NJIT	W 87–49	2–1	19 – Alston	9 – Belle	5 – Harper	Siegel Center (6,230); Richmond, VA
November 19, 2026*; 10:30 p.m., ESPN2		at Santa Clara	W 83–77 ^{OT}	3–1	28 – Harper	7 – Harper	5 – Jennings	Leavey Center (1,977); Santa Clara, CA
November 23, 2026*; 9:00 p.m., ESPNU		vs. Providence; Maui Invitational First Round						Lahaina Civic Center; Lahaina, HI
November 24, 2026*; TBD		vs. Arizona/Colorado State; Maui Invitational						Lahaina Civic Center; Lahaina, HI
November 25, 2026*; TBD		vs. TBD; Maui Invitational						Lahaina Civic Center; Lahaina, HI
December 3, 2026*; 7:00 p.m., MASN/ESPN+		Coppin State						Siegel Center; Richmond, VA
December 7, 2026*; 7:00 p.m., MASN/ESPN+		North Carolina Central						Siegel Center; Richmond, VA
December 12, 2026*; 2:30 p.m., ESPN+		vs. Florida Atlantic; Hall of Fame Series						Kia Center; Orlando, FL
December 15, 2026*; 7:00 p.m., MASN/ESPN+		Central Connecticut						Siegel Center; Richmond, VA
December 19, 2026*; 3:00 p.m., ESPN+		vs. Mississippi State; Rocket City Classic						Propst Arena; Huntsville, AL
December 22, 2026*; 7:00 p.m., WTVR/MASN/ESPN+		Morgan State						Siegel Center; Richmond, VA
Atlantic 10 regular season
December 30, 2026; 8:00 p.m., CBSSN		at St. Bonaventure						Reilly Center; St. Bonaventure, NY
January 2, 2027; 12:30 p.m., USA		Duquesne						Siegel Center; Richmond, VA
January 6, 2027; 6:00 p.m., CBSSN		Davidson						Siegel Center; Richmond, VA
January 9, 2027; 2:00 p.m., ESPNU		at George Washington						Charles E. Smith Center; Washington, DC
January 13, 2027; 6:00 p.m., MASN/ESPN+		La Salle						Siegel Center; Richmond, VA
January 18, 2027; 3:00 p.m., CBSSN		at Saint Joseph's						Hagan Arena; Philadelphia, PA
January 22, 2027; 6:00 p.m., ESPN2		at Dayton						UD Arena; Dayton, OH
January 27, 2027; 6:00 p.m., CBSSN		George Mason; Rivalry						Siegel Center; Richmond, VA
January 30, 2027; 8:00 p.m., CBSSN		Richmond; Capital City Classic						Siegel Center; Richmond, VA
February 5, 2027; 7:00 p.m., ESPN2		at Saint Louis						Chaifetz Arena; St. Louis, MO
February 10, 2027; 7:00 p.m., CBSSN		Rhode Island						Siegel Center; Richmond, VA
February 13, 2027; 12:00 p.m., CBSSN		at Richmond; Capital City Classic						Robins Center; Richmond, VA
February 16, 2027; 7:00 p.m., ESPN+		at Fordham						Rose Hill Gymnasium; Bronx, NY
February 19, 2027; 7:00 p.m., ESPN2		Saint Louis						Siegel Center; Richmond, VA
February 23, 2027; 6:30 p.m., CBSSN		St. Bonaventure						Siegel Center; Richmond, VA
February 26, 2027; 7:00 p.m., ESPN2		at George Mason; Rivalry						EagleBank Arena; Fairfax, VA
March 2, 2027; 7:00 p.m., CBSSN		at Loyola Chicago						Joseph J. Gentile Arena; Chicago, IL
March 5, 2027; 7:00 p.m., ESPN2		at Dayton						UD Arena; Dayton, OH
A-10 tournament
March 10–14, 2027; TBA		vs.						Barclays Center; Brooklyn, NY
*Non-conference game. ^{#}Rankings from AP poll. (#) Tournament seedings in parentheses. All times are in Eastern Time.
