= 1984 Maui Invitational =

1984 Maui Invitational Tournament
- Season: 1984–85
- Teams: 4
- Finals site: Lahaina Civic Center; Maui, Hawaii
- Champions: Providence (1st title)
- Runner-up: Chaminade (1st title game)
- Semifinalists: Virginia; Davidson
- Winning coach: Joe Mullaney (1st title)
- MVP: Patrick Langlois (Chaminade)

The 1984 Maui Invitational Tournament was the inaugural edition of an early-season college basketball tournament that was played November 23–24, 1984, and was part of the 1984-85 NCAA Division I men's basketball season. The tournament was played at the Lahaina Civic Center in Maui, Hawaii and was won by the Providence Friars. It was the first title for the program and its head coach Joe Mullaney.

== Bracket ==
Semifinals; Friday, November 23
Chaminade	77
Davidson	62
Virginia	71
Providence	75

Championship game Saturday, November 24
Chaminade	58
Providence	60
Consolation; Saturday, November 24
Davidson	65
Virginia	69
