= Ivan Kharchenkov =

German basketball player (born 2006)

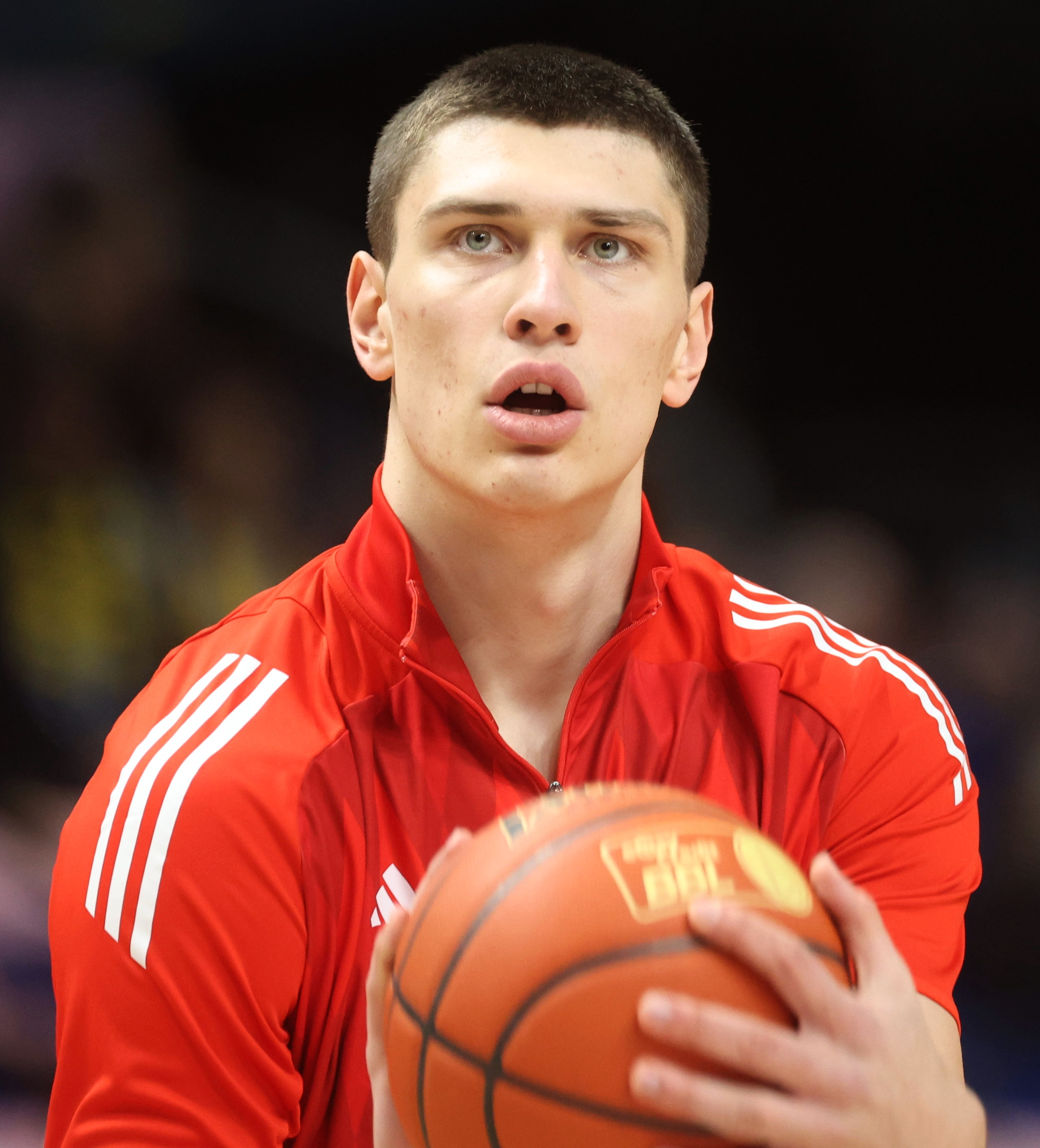
- Kharchenkov in 2025

No. 8 – Arizona Wildcats
- Position: Small forward
- League: Big 12 Conference

Personal information
- Born: 20 September 2006 (age 20) Moscow, Russia
- Listed height: 6 ft 7 in (2.01 m)
- Listed weight: 230 lb (104 kg)

Career information
- College: Arizona (2025–present)
- Playing career: 2022–present

Career history
- 2022–2025: FC Bayern Munich

Career highlights
- Bundesliga champion (2025)
Medals
Men's basketball
Representing Germany
FIBA U18 EuroBasket
Gold medal – first place	2024 Finland	Team
Bronze medal – third place	2023 Serbia	Team
FIBA U16 EuroBasket
Gold medal – first place	2022 Bulgaria	Team

Ivan Kharchenkov (born 20 September 2006) is a German-Russian college basketball player for the Arizona Wildcats of the Big 12 Conference.

== Early life ==
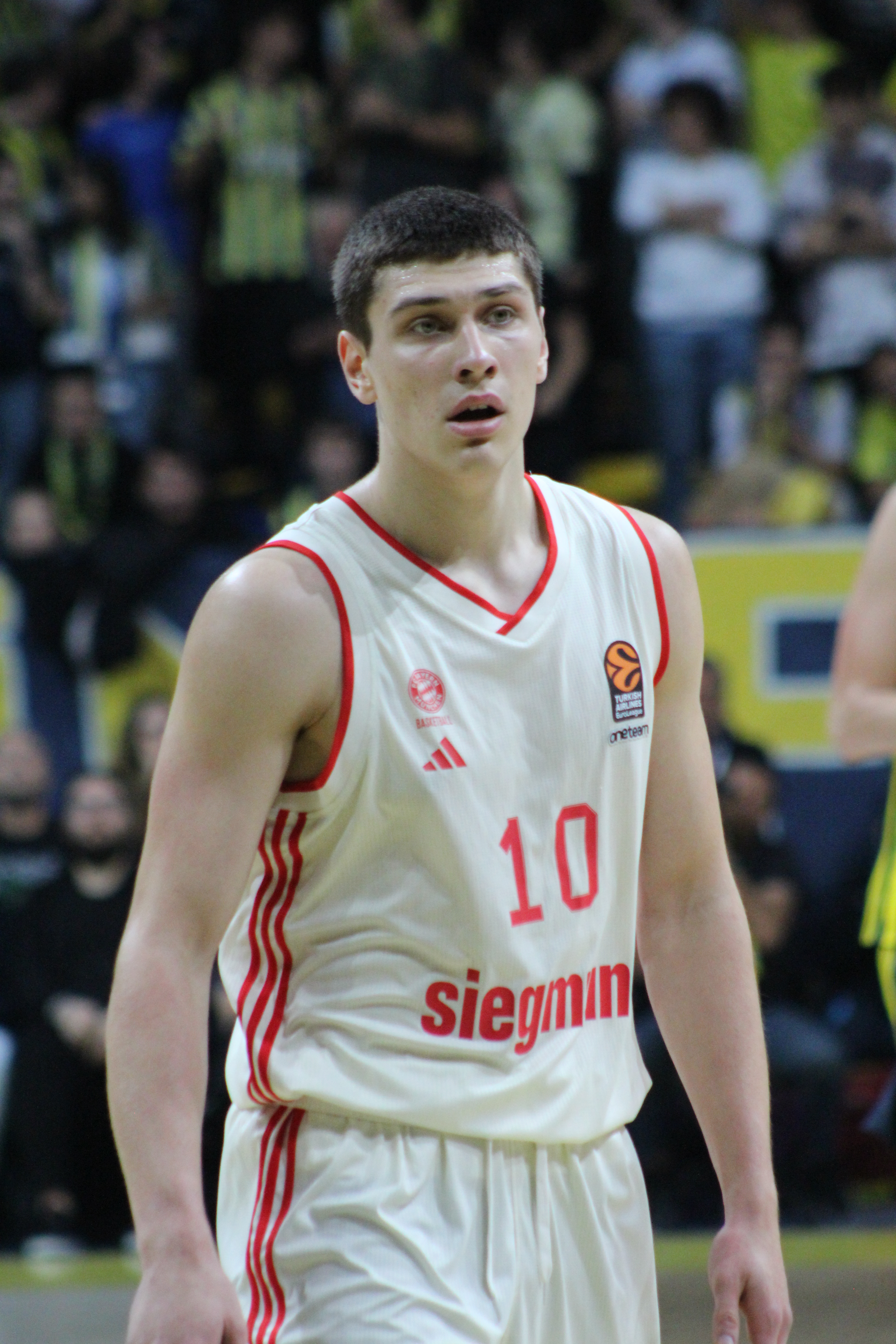
Kharchenkov playing for FC Bayern Munich

Kharchenkov was born in Moscow, Russia, and grew up in Germany. He began his basketball career playing for the youth squads of DJK Landsberg and TS Jahn München, before joining FC Bayern Munich in 2017. In November 2022, Kharchenkov played his first game for Bayern Munich at 16 years old, becoming the youngest player to score a basket in the Bundesliga since 1998. In May 2024, he received a three-year contract from FC Bayern Munich. During the 2024–25 season, Kharchenkov averaged 5.2 points per game. In July 2025, he committed to play college basketball in the United States at the University of Arizona.

== College career ==
As a true freshman, Kharchenkov made an instant impact starting in every game. Throughout the duration of the season, he emerged as one of the Wildcat's top defenders. In his collegiate debut against Florida, Kharchenkov recorded a double-double totaling 12 points and 10 rebounds.

== National team career ==
Kharchenkov began his international career at the youth level, helping the Germany U16 national team win a gold medal in 2022. He finished the competition averaging 13.3 points, 5.5 rebounds, and 2.9 assists per game.

During the next two years, Kharchenkov was selected to represent the Germany U18 national team, where he helped them win bronze in 2023, and a title at the 2024 FIBA U18 EuroBasket in Finland, averaging 17.5 points, 5.3 rebounds, and 3.8 assists per game.

== Career statistics ==
Legend
GP	Games played	GS	Games started	MPG	Minutes per game
FG%	Field goal percentage	3P%	3-point field goal percentage	FT%	Free throw percentage
RPG	Rebounds per game	APG	Assists per game	SPG	Steals per game
BPG	Blocks per game	PPG	Points per game	**Bold**	Career high

=== College ===
Year	Team	GP	GS	MPG	FG%	3P%	FT%	RPG	APG	SPG	BPG	PPG
2025–26	Arizona	39	39	28.4	.492	.317	.723	4.3	2.3	1.4	.3	10.4
