= Dedan Thomas Jr. =

American basketball player

No. 9 – Houston Cougars
- Position: Point guard
- Conference: Big 12 Conference

Personal information
- Born: September 8, 2005 (age 21) Las Vegas, Nevada, U.S.
- Listed height: 6 ft 1 in (1.85 m)
- Listed weight: 180 lb (82 kg)

Career information
- High school: Liberty (Henderson, Nevada)
- College: UNLV (2023–2025); LSU (2025–2026); Houston (2026–present)

Dedan Thomas Jr. (born September 8, 2005) is an American college basketball player for the Houston Cougars of the Big 12 Conference. He previously played for the UNLV Runnin' Rebels and LSU Tigers.

== Early life and high school ==
Thomas Jr. attended Liberty High School in Henderson, Nevada. As a junior, he averaged 22.8 points, 5.1 assists, and 1.2 steals per game and was named the Nevada Gatorade Player of the Year. Coming out of high school, Thomas Jr. was rated as a four-star recruit and committed to play college basketball for the UNLV Runnin' Rebels.

== College career ==
Heading into his freshman season, Thomas Jr. became the team's starting point guard. On December 13, 2023, he recorded 16 points, nine assists and six rebounds in an upset win over #8 Creighton. Thomas Jr. finished his freshman season in 2023–24, starting in 34 games, where he averaged 13.6 points and 5.1 assists per game. On November 23, 2024, he recorded 22 points, five rebounds, and four assists in a win over New Mexico State. On January 18, 2025, Thomas Jr. posted 19 points and five assists in a victory against San Diego State. He missed the final seven games of the season due to a shoulder injury. Thomas Jr. finished the 2024–25 season making 26 starts, where he averaged 15.6 points and 4.7 assists per game. After the season, he entered his name into the NCAA transfer portal.

Thomas Jr. transferred to LSU. He averaged 15.3 points, 6.5 assists, and 2.7 rebounds per game in 16 games but suffered a left foot injury that required season-ending surgery. Following the season Thomas Jr. transferred to Houston.

== Personal life ==
He is son of former star UNLV basketball player Dedan Thomas Sr.
