= 2026–27 Presbyterian Blue Hose men's basketball team =

American college basketball season

2026–27 Presbyterian Blue Hose men's basketball
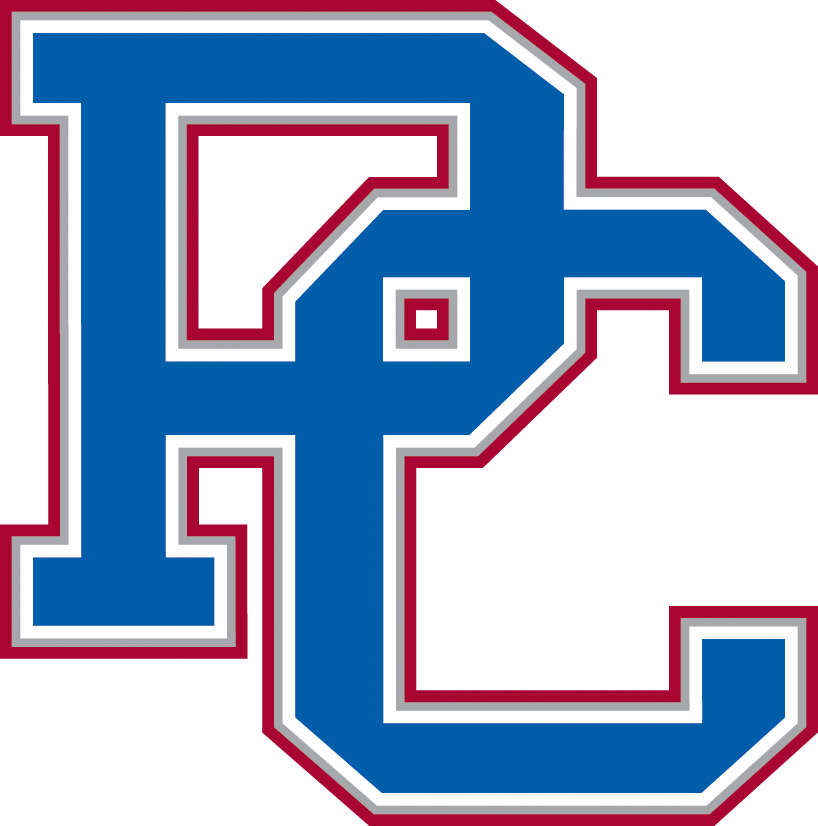
- Conference: Big South Conference
- Record: 1–3 (0–0 Big South)
- Head coach: Quinton Ferrell (8th season)
- Associate head coach: Justin Griffith
- Assistant coaches: Al'lonzo Coleman; Rob Lane; Jermaine Blackmon
- Home arena: Templeton Center

2026–27 Big South men's basketball standings
| | Conf. | | | | Overall |
| Team | W | | L | PCT | W | | L | PCT |
|---|---|---|---|---|---|---|---|---|
| High Point | 0 | – | 0 | – | 5 | – | 0 | 1.000 |
| Longwood | 0 | – | 0 | – | 4 | – | 2 | .667 |
| Charleston Southern | 0 | – | 0 | – | 2 | – | 3 | .400 |
| UNC Asheville | 0 | – | 0 | – | 2 | – | 4 | .333 |
| Presbyterian | 0 | – | 0 | – | 1 | – | 3 | .250 |
| Gardner–Webb | 0 | – | 0 | – | 1 | – | 4 | .200 |
| Radford | 0 | – | 0 | – | 1 | – | 4 | .200 |
| USC Upstate | 0 | – | 0 | – | 1 | – | 5 | .167 |
| Winthrop | 0 | – | 0 | – | 0 | – | 5 | .000 |
† 2027 Big South tournament winner As of November 19, 2026; Rankings from AP poll

The 2026–27 Presbyterian Blue Hose men's basketball team represents Presbyterian College during the 2026–27 NCAA Division I men's basketball season. The Blue Hose are led by eighth-year head coach Quinton Ferrell and play their home games at the Templeton Center in Clinton, South Carolina as members of the Big South Conference.

== Previous season ==
The Blue Hose finished the 2025–26 season 15–18, 7–9 in Big South play, to finish in sixth place. As the No. 6 seed in the Big South tournament, they defeated Radford in the quarterfinals before losing to Winthrop in the semifinals.

== Roster ==
2026–27 Presbyterian Blue Hose men's basketball team
Players
Coaches

| Pos. | # | Name | Height | Weight | Year | Previous school | Hometown |
|---|---|---|---|---|---|---|---|
| G | 0 | EJ Smith | 6 ft 3 in (1.91 m) | 180 lb (82 kg) | Jr | Lincoln Memorial | Memphis, Tennessee |
| G | 1 | Luke Allison | 6 ft 0 in (1.83 m) | 170 lb (77 kg) | Jr | Sentinel High School | Missoula, Montana |
| G | 2 | Khalon Hudson | 6 ft 6 in (1.98 m) | 220 lb (100 kg) | Sr | Spartanburg Methodist College | Augusta, Georgia |
| G | 3 | JD Bowden | 6 ft 2 in (1.88 m) | 170 lb (77 kg) | So | Ambassador Christian School | Charlotte, North Carolina |
| G | 4 | Wade Marsh | 6 ft 1 in (1.85 m) | 180 lb (82 kg) | Fr | Cardinal Newman High School | Columbia, South Carolina |
| G | 5 | Iverson King | 6 ft 6 in (1.98 m) | 205 lb (93 kg) | Jr | Forsyth Country Day School | Winston-Salem, North Carolina |
| F | 6 | Chidi Chiakwelu | 6 ft 8 in (2.03 m) | 210 lb (95 kg) | Jr | George Ranch High School | Houston, Texas |
| G | 7 | Triston Wilson | 6 ft 7 in (2.01 m) | 215 lb (98 kg) | Jr | Miami Norland Senior High School | Miami, Florida |
| G | 10 | Amare Anderson | 6 ft 1 in (1.85 m) | 185 lb (84 kg) | So | Greer High School | Greer, South Carolina |
| G | 11 | Erik Taylor | 6 ft 1 in (1.85 m) | 190 lb (86 kg) | Jr | Sam Houston | Orlando, Florida |
| G | 12 | Carl Parrish | 6 ft 3 in (1.91 m) | 175 lb (79 kg) | Sr | Miami Norland Senior High School | Miami Gardens, Florida |
| F | 13 | Augustine Ayelyine | 6 ft 10 in (2.08 m) | 210 lb (95 kg) | RS Fr | University Christian School | Sunyani, Ghana |
| G | 21 | Nehemiah Young | 6 ft 4 in (1.93 m) | 210 lb (95 kg) | Fr | South Kent School | Tallahassee, Florida |
| F | 23 | Langston Hackworth | 6 ft 10 in (2.08 m) | 240 lb (109 kg) | Fr | Andrew Jackson High School | Jacksonville, Florida |
| F | 42 | Jaylen Peterson | 6 ft 8 in (2.03 m) | 210 lb (95 kg) | GS | Greenforest-McCalep Christian Academy | Stone Mountain, Georgia |

Head coach

- Quinton Ferrell (Presbyterian)

Assistant coach(es)

- Justin Griffith (North Carolina Wesleyan)
- Al'lonzo Coleman (Presbyterian)
- Rob Lane (Pittsburgh)
- Jermaine Blackmon (College of Charleston)

Legend

- (C) Team captain
- (S) Suspended
- (I) Ineligible
- (W) Walk-on
- Injured
- Current redshirt

Roster
Last update: November 6, 2026

== Schedule and results ==
| Date time, TV | Rank^{#} | Opponent^{#} | Result | Record | Site (attendance) city, state |
Exhibition
| October 28, 2026*; 7:00 p.m. | | at Clemson | L 70–84 | – | Littlejohn Coliseum (1,247); Clemson, SC |
Non-conference regular season
| November 2, 2026*; 7:00 p.m., ESPN+ | | St. Thomas | L 78–87 | 0–1 | Templeton Center (563); Clinton, SC |
| November 6, 2026*; 7:00 p.m., SECN+ | | at Georgia | L 77–91 | 0–2 | Stegeman Coliseum (5,777); Athens, GA |
| November 10, 2026*; 7:00 p.m., ACCNX | | at NC State | L 60–94 | 0–3 | Lenovo Center (11,764); Raleigh, NC |
| November 18, 2026*; 7:00 p.m., ESPN+ | | Mercer | W 88–84 | 1–3 | Templeton Center (627); Clinton, SC |
| November 21, 2026*; 7:30 p.m., ESPN+ | | at Tennessee Tech | | | Eblen Center; Cookeville, TN |
| November 24, 2026*; 7:00 p.m., ESPN+ | | Carolina Christian | | | Templeton Center; Clinton, SC |
| November 28, 2026*; 2:00 p.m., ESPN+ | | Sacramento State | | | Templeton Center; Clinton, SC |
| December 2, 2026*; 7:00 p.m., ESPN+ | | at Butler | | | Hinkle Fieldhouse; Indianapolis, IN |
| December 5, 2026*; 2:00 p.m., ESPN+ | | at Morehead State | | | Ellis Johnson Arena; Morehead, KY |
| December 8, 2026*; 7:00 p.m., ESPN+ | | at East Tennessee State | | | Freedom Hall Civic Center; Johnson City, TN |
| December 12, 2026*; 7:00 p.m., ESPN+ | | Samford | | | Templeton Center; Clinton, SC |
| December 15, 2026*; 12:00 p.m., ESPN+ | | Allen | | | Templeton Center; Clinton, SC |
| December 19, 2026*; 2:00 p.m., ESPN+ | | at Navy | | | Alumni Hall; Annapolis, MD |
| December 22, 2026*; 4:00 p.m., ACCNX | | at Wake Forest | | | LJVM Coliseum; Winston-Salem, NC |
| December 28, 2026*; 7:00 p.m., ESPN+ | | Columbia International | | | Templeton Center; Clinton, SC |
Big South regular season
| January 1, 2027; 4:00 p.m., ESPN+ | | at Radford | | | Dedmon Center; Radford, VA |
| January 3, 2027; 3:00 p.m., ESPN+ | | at Longwood | | | Joan Perry Brock Center; Farmville, VA |
| January 6, 2027; 7:00 p.m., ESPN+ | | High Point | | | Templeton Center; Clinton, SC |
| January 9, 2027; 1:00 p.m., ESPN+ | | at Gardner–Webb | | | Paul Porter Arena; Boiling Springs, NC |
| January 16, 2027; 2:00 p.m., ESPN+ | | Winthrop | | | Templeton Center; Clinton, SC |
| January 20, 2027; 7:00 p.m., ESPN+ | | USC Upstate | | | Templeton Center; Clinton, SC |
| January 23, 2027; 2:00 p.m., ESPN+ | | at UNC Asheville | | | Kimmel Arena; Asheville, NC |
| January 28, 2027; 7:00 p.m., ESPN+ | | at Charleston Southern | | | Buccaneer Field House; North Charleston, SC |
| January 30, 2027; 2:00 p.m., ESPN+ | | Gardner–Webb | | | Templeton Center; Clinton, SC |
| February 3, 2027; 6:30 p.m. | | at USC Upstate | | | G. B. Hodge Center; Spartanburg, SC |
| February 6, 2027; 2:00 p.m., ESPN+ | | Longwood | | | Templeton Center; Clinton, SC |
| February 11, 2027; 7:00 p.m., ESPN+ | | Radford | | | Templeton Center; Clinton, SC |
| February 18, 2027; 7:00 p.m., ESPN+ | | UNC Asheville | | | Templeton Center; Clinton, SC |
| February 20, 2027; 2:00 p.m., ESPN+ | | at High Point | | | Qubein Center; High Point, NC |
| February 25, 2026; 6:30 p.m., ESPN+ | | at Winthrop | | | Winthrop Coliseum; Rock Hill, SC |
| February 27, 2027; 2:00 p.m., ESPN+ | | Charleston Southern | | | Templeton Center; Clinton, SC |
Big South tournament
| March 3–5, 2027; TBA | | vs. | | | Freedom Hall Civic Center; Johnson City, TN |
*Non-conference game. ^{#}Rankings from AP Poll. (#) Tournament seedings in parentheses. All times are in Eastern.
