= 2026–27 North Carolina Central Eagles men's basketball team =

American college basketball season

2026–27 North Carolina Central Eagles men's basketball
- Conference: Mid-Eastern Athletic Conference
- Record: 1–5 (0–0 MEAC)
- Head coach: LeVelle Moton (18th season)
- Assistant coaches: Reggie Sharp; Nigel Thomas; Wes Pifer
- Home arena: McDougald–McLendon Arena

2026–27 MEAC men's basketball standings
	Conf.				Overall
Team	W		L	PCT	W		L	PCT
Morgan State	0	–	0	–	4	–	2	.667
South Carolina State	0	–	0	–	3	–	2	.600
Howard	0	–	0	–	3	–	3	.500
Delaware State	0	–	0	–	2	–	3	.400
Norfolk State	0	–	0	–	2	–	4	.333
Coppin State	0	–	0	–	1	–	5	.167
Maryland Eastern Shore	0	–	0	–	1	–	5	.167
North Carolina Central	0	–	0	–	1	–	5	.167
† 2027 MEAC tournament winner As of November 19, 2026; Rankings from AP poll

The 2026–27 North Carolina Central Eagles men's basketball team will represent North Carolina Central University during the 2026–27 NCAA Division I men's basketball season. The Eagles, led by 18th-year head coach LeVelle Moton, will play their home games at McDougald–McLendon Arena in Durham, North Carolina as members of the Mid-Eastern Athletic Conference (MEAC).

== Previous season ==
The Eagles finished the 2025–26 season 14–18, 8–6 in MEAC play, to finish in a tie for third place. As the No. 3 seed in the MEAC tournament, they defeated Maryland Eastern Shore and Delaware State before falling to Howard in the championship game.

== Preseason ==
On October 21, 2026, the MEAC released their preseason polls. North Carolina Central was picked to finish fourth in the conference.

=== Preseason rankings ===
MEAC Preseason Poll
Place	Team	Votes
1	Howard	62 (6)
2	Morgan State	46 (1)
3	Norfolk State	43 (1)
4	North Carolina Central	42
5	South Carolina State	36
T–6	Delaware State	20
T–6	Coppin State	20
8	Maryland Eastern Shore	18
(#) first-place votes

== Roster ==
2026–27 North Carolina Central Eagles men's basketball team
Players
Coaches

Pos.	#	Name	Height	Weight	Year	Previous school	Hometown
F	0	Christian Meeks	6 ft 6 in (1.98 m)	220 lb (100 kg)	GS	Morgan State	Chicago, IL
G	1	Alius Bowser	6 ft 4 in (1.93 m)	192 lb (87 kg)	Jr	Brunswick CC	Charlotte, NC
G	2	Darius Kane	6 ft 3 in (1.91 m)	185 lb (84 kg)	Sr	Brunswick CC	Burlington, NC
F	3	Duor Duor	6 ft 11 in (2.11 m)	205 lb (93 kg)	Fr	South Atlanta HS	Atlanta, GA
G	4	Isaiah Buckley	6 ft 2 in (1.88 m)	176 lb (80 kg)	Jr	Shaw	Prince George's County, MD
G	5	Bryce Selby	5 ft 11 in (1.8 m)	161 lb (73 kg)	So	St. Charles HS	Waldorf, MD
G	6	Trey Brown	6 ft 7 in (2.01 m)	200 lb (91 kg)	Sr	Maryland Eastern Shore	Phoenix, AZ
F	8	Maurice Vassel	6 ft 9 in (2.06 m)	205 lb (93 kg)	Jr	Maryland Eastern Shore	Saint Ann, Jamaica
G	9	Chandler Thomas	6 ft 4 in (1.93 m)	190 lb (86 kg)	Jr	South Georgia State	Warner Robins, GA
G	10	Ryan Archey	6 ft 0 in (1.83 m)	175 lb (79 kg)	Sr	Coppin State	Prince George's County, MD
G	11	Viktor Alao	6 ft 3 in (1.91 m)	190 lb (86 kg)	So	Brunswick CC	Fuquay-Varina, NC
F	12	Tyler Mason	6 ft 10 in (2.08 m)	240 lb (109 kg)	Sr	Alabama State	Stafford, VA
F	13	Jozohn Price	6 ft 10 in (2.08 m)	215 lb (98 kg)	Jr	Gaston	Charlotte, NC
G	23	Cristian Sanon	6 ft 6 in (1.98 m)	205 lb (93 kg)	Sr	Claflin	Odessa, FL
C	33	Daniel Mbaeteka	7 ft 0 in (2.13 m)	280 lb (127 kg)	Jr	Shaw	Benin City, Nigeria

Head coach

- LeVelle Moton (North Carolina Central)

Assistant coach(es)

- Reggie Sharp (Auburn)
- Nigel Thomas (Langston)
- Wes Pifer (Penn State Altoona)

Legend

- (C) Team captain
- (S) Suspended
- (I) Ineligible
- (W) Walk-on
- Injured
- Current redshirt

Roster
Last update: October 29, 2026

== Schedule and results ==
Date time, TV	Rank^{#}	Opponent^{#}	Result	Record	Site (attendance) city, state
Non-conference regular season
November 2, 2026*; 7:30 p.m., SECN+		at Georgia	L 62–78	0–1	Stegeman Coliseum (5,553); Athens, GA
November 7, 2026*; 3:00 p.m., ESPN+		at Longwood	L 75–80 ^{OT}	0–2	Joan Perry Brock Center (3,017); Farmville, VA
November 11, 2026*; 6:00 p.m., ESPN+		at VMI	L 51–65	0–3	Cameron Hall (2,243); Lexington, VA
November 13, 2026*; 7:30 p.m., ESPN+		at Liberty	L 66–74	0–4	Liberty Arena (3,668); Lynchburg, VA
November 16, 2026*; 7:00 p.m., MEAC Network		Virginia-Lynchburg	W 117–71	1–4	McDougald–McLendon Arena (2,325); Durham, NC
November 18, 2026*; 7:00 p.m., ESPN+		at George Mason	L 60–83	1–5	EagleBank Arena (2,667); Fairfax, VA
November 23, 2026*; 7:30 p.m., MEAC Network		Carolina			McDougald–McLendon Arena; Durham, NC
November 28, 2026*; 1:00 p.m., ESPN+		at Gardner–Webb			Paul Porter Arena; Boiling Springs, NC
December 1, 2026*; 7:30 p.m., MEAC Network		Toccoa Falls			McDougald–McLendon Arena; Durham, NC
December 5, 2026*; 2:00 p.m., MEAC Network		USC Upstate			McDougald–McLendon Arena; Durham, NC
December 7, 2026*; 7:00 p.m., ESPN+		at VCU			Siegel Center; Richmond, VA
December 11, 2026*; 7:30 p.m.		at Drake			Knapp Center; Des Moines, IA
December 13, 2026*; 6:00 p.m., ESPN+		at Iowa State			Hilton Coliseum; Ames, IA
December 15, 2026*; 7:00 p.m., ESPN+		at High Point			Qubein Center; High Point, NC
December 22, 2026*; 4:00 p.m., SECN+		at South Carolina			Colonial Life Arena; Columbia, SC
December 28, 2026*; 2:00 p.m.		Truett McConnell			McDougald–McLendon Arena; Durham, NC
MEAC regular season
January 2, 2027; 4:30 p.m.		at Norfolk State			Echols Hall; Norfolk, VA
January 9, 2027; 5:00 p.m.		Coppin State			McDougald–McLendon Arena; Durham, NC
January 11, 2027; 7:00 p.m.		Morgan State			McDougald–McLendon Arena; Durham, NC
January 16, 2027; TBD		at Howard			Burr Gymnasium; Washington, D.C.
January 23, 2027; 5:00 p.m.		at Delaware State			Memorial Hall; Dover, DE
January 25, 2027; 6:00 p.m.		at Maryland Eastern Shore			Hytche Athletic Center; Princess Anne, MD
January 30, 2027; 5:00 p.m.		South Carolina State			McDougald–McLendon Arena; Durham, NC
February 6, 2027; 5:00 p.m.		Norfolk State			McDougald–McLendon Arena; Durham, NC
February 8, 2027; 5:00 p.m.		Howard			McDougald–McLendon Arena; Durham, NC
February 13, 2027; 5:00 p.m.		at Coppin State			Physical Education Complex; Baltimore, MD
February 15, 2027; 7:00 p.m.		at Morgan State			Hill Field House; Baltimore, MD
February 27, 2027; 5:00 p.m.		Delaware State			McDougald–McLendon Arena; Durham, NC
March 1, 2027; 7:00 p.m.		Maryland Eastern Shore			McDougald–McLendon Arena; Durham, NC
March 4, 2026; TBD		at South Carolina State			SHM Memorial Center; Orangeburg, SC
MEAC tournament
March 10–11, 2027		vs.			Norfolk Scope; Norfolk, VA
*Non-conference game. ^{#}Rankings from AP poll. (#) Tournament seedings in parentheses. All times are in Eastern.
