= 2026–27 Arizona State Sun Devils men's basketball team =

American college basketball season

2026–27 Arizona State Sun Devils men's basketball
- Conference: Big 12 Conference
- Record: 5–0 (0–0 Big 12)
- Head coach: Randy Bennett (1st season)
- Assistant coaches: Rick Croy (1st season); David Patrick (1st season); Joe Rahon (1st season); E. J. Rowland (1st season); Casey Benson (1st season)
- Home arena: Desert Financial Arena

2026–27 Big 12 men's basketball standings
| | Conf. | | | | Overall |
| Team | W | | L | PCT | W | | L | PCT |
|---|---|---|---|---|---|---|---|---|
| Arizona State | 0 | – | 0 | – | 5 | – | 0 | 1.000 |
| No. 21 BYU | 0 | – | 0 | – | 5 | – | 0 | 1.000 |
| No. 8 Houston | 0 | – | 0 | – | 5 | – | 0 | 1.000 |
| No. 11 Kansas | 0 | – | 0 | – | 5 | – | 0 | 1.000 |
| No. 9 Texas Tech | 0 | – | 0 | – | 5 | – | 0 | 1.000 |
| TCU | 0 | – | 0 | – | 4 | – | 0 | 1.000 |
| No. 12 Arizona | 0 | – | 0 | – | 4 | – | 1 | .800 |
| Baylor | 0 | – | 0 | – | 4 | – | 1 | .800 |
| Cincinnati | 0 | – | 0 | – | 4 | – | 1 | .800 |
| UCF | 0 | – | 0 | – | 4 | – | 1 | .800 |
| West Virginia | 0 | – | 0 | – | 4 | – | 1 | .800 |
| Iowa State | 0 | – | 0 | – | 3 | – | 1 | .750 |
| Kansas State | 0 | – | 0 | – | 3 | – | 1 | .750 |
| Oklahoma State | 0 | – | 0 | – | 3 | – | 1 | .750 |
| Utah | 0 | – | 0 | – | 3 | – | 1 | .750 |
| Colorado | 0 | – | 0 | – | 2 | – | 3 | .400 |
† 2027 Big 12 tournament winner As of November 19, 2026; Rankings from AP poll

The 2026–27 Arizona State Sun Devils men's basketball team will represent Arizona State University during the 2026–27 NCAA Division I men's basketball season. The Sun Devils, will be led by 1st-year head coach Randy Bennett, play their home games at Desert Financial Arena in Tempe, Arizona as members of the Big 12 Conference.

== Previous season ==
The Sun Devils finished the 2025–26 season 17–16, 7–11 in Big 12 play to finish in a tie for 11th place. They were the 12 seed in the Big 12 tournament where they defeated 13 seed Baylor 83−79 in the first round and were defeated by 7 seed Iowa State 42−91 in the second round. The Sun Devils did not participate in any post season basketball tournaments, ending their season. Former head coach Bobby Hurley contract expired and was not extended, he ended his 11-year Sun Devil coaching tenure with a 185–167 record with only three NCAA tournament appearances.

== Off-season ==
=== Departures ===
| Name | Pos. | Height | Year | Hometown | Reason for departure |
|---|---|---|---|---|---|
| Marcus Adams Jr. | F | 6'8" | (redshirt) Sophomore | Torrance, CA | Transferred to Hawaii |
| Trevor Best | G | 6'3" | Sophomore | Wilson, NC | Transferred to East Carolina |
| Massamba Diop | C | 7'1" | Freshman | Rufisque, Senegal | Transferred to Gonzaga |
| Andrija Grbović | F | 6'11" | Junior | Pljevlja, Montenegro | Transferred to Oklahoma State |
| Adante' Holiman | G | 5'11" | Senior | McAlester, OK | Transferred to Old Dominion |
| Jovan Ićitović | F | 6'9" | Freshman | Belgrade, Serbia | Transferred to Northeastern |
| Anthony Johnson | G | 6'3" | Senior | Midfield, AL | Exhausted eligibility |
| Quentin McCoy | G | 6'1" | Sophomore | Chicago, IL | Transferred to Illinois |
| Noah Meeusen | G | 6'5" | Sophomore | Zandvliet, Belgium | Transferred to DePaul |
| Allen Mukeba | F | 6'8" | GS | Charleroi, Belgium | Exhausted eligibility |
| Moe Odum | G | 6'2" | Senior | Bronx, NY | Exhausted eligibility |
| Kash Polk | F | 6'10" | Freshman | Argyle, TX | Transferred to Jacksonville State |
| Dame Salane | C | 7'1" | Freshman | Biella, Italy | Transferred to Tulane |
| Santiago Trouet | F | 6'11" | (redshirt) Sophomore | Buenos Aires, Argentina | Transferred to Ole Miss |

=== Incoming transfers ===
| Name | Pos. | Height | Year | Hometown | Previous school |
|---|---|---|---|---|---|
| Ben Defty | C | 7'0" | Senior | Berlin, Germany | Transferred from Boston |
| Joel Foxwell | PG | 6'1" | Sophomore | Melbourne, Australia | Transferred from Portland |
| Nate Garcia | C | 7'0" | Sophomore | Glendora, CA | Transferred from California Baptist |
| Jonathan Griman | C | 6'11" | Senior | Caracas, Venezuela | Transferred from California Baptist |
| Emmanuel Innocenti | F | 6'5" | Senior | Petit Badien, Ivory Coast | Transferred from Gonzaga |
| Paulius Murauskas | F | 6'8" | Senior | Kaunas, Lithuania | Transferred from Saint Mary's (CA) |
| Dillan Shaw | F | 6'7" | Sophomore | Northridge, CA | Transferred from Saint Mary's (CA) |
| Marcus Vaughns | F | 6'8" | Sophomore | Melbourne, VIC | Transferred from LSU |

=== Recruiting class ===
College recruiting
| Name | Hometown | School | Height | Weight | Commit date |
|---|---|---|---|---|---|
| JRob Croy; G | Riverside, CA | Riverside Polytechnic High School | 6 ft 5 in (1.96 m) | 190 lb (86 kg) | Mar 24, 2026 |
| JRob Croy; G | Recruit ratings: Scout: Rivals: 247Sports: ESPN: (80) | | | | |
| Ajak Nyuon; F | Melbourne, Australia | Centre of Excellence | 6 ft 10 in (2.08 m) | 195 lb (88 kg) | May 6, 2026 |
| Ajak Nyuon; F | Recruit ratings: Scout: Rivals: 247Sports: ESPN: (NR) | | | | |
| Filip Malesevic; C | Belgrade, Serbia | FMP Beograd | 7 ft 1 in (2.16 m) | 220 lb (100 kg) | May 14, 2026 |
| Filip Malesevic; C | Recruit ratings: Scout: Rivals: 247Sports: ESPN: (NR) | | | | |
Overall recruit ranking: Scout: 88 Rivals: 57 247Sports: 88 ESPN: NR
Note: In many cases, Scout, Rivals, 247Sports, On3, and ESPN may conflict in their listings of height and weight.; In these cases, the average was taken. ESPN grades are on a 100-point scale.; Sources: "2026 Team Ranking". Rivals.

== Preseason ==
The Big 12 preseason coaches & media poll will be released in October 2026. All awards will be voted on by the league's 16 head coaches, who can not vote for their own team or players.

Big 12 Preseason Coaches Poll

| | Big 12 Coaches | Points |
| 1. | Arizona | 220 (12) |
| 2. | Houston | 214 (4) |
| 3. | Kansas | 186 |
| 4. | Iowa State | 181 |
| 5. | Texas Tech | 180 |
| 6. | BYU | 148 |
| 7. | TCU | 137 |
| T8. | Cincinnati | 116 |
| T8. | West Virginia | 116 |
| 10. | Baylor | 102 |
| 11. | Oklahoma State | 98 |
| 12. | Arizona State | 75 |
| 13. | UCF | 55 |
| T14. | Colorado | 34 |
| T14. | Kansas State | 34 |
| 16. | Utah | 24 |
Reference: (#) first-place votes

Big 12 Preseason Media Poll

| | Big 12 Coaches |
| 1. | Arizona |
| 2. | Houston |
| 3. | Kansas |
| 4. | Texas Tech |
| 5. | Iowa State |
| 6. | BYU |
| 7. | Baylor |
| 8. | TCU |
| 9. | Cincinnati |
| 10. | West Virginia |
| 11. | Oklahoma State |
| 12. | Arizona State |
| 13. | UCF |
| 14. | Kansas State |
| 15. | Colorado |
| 16. | Utah |

All-Big 12 Preseason First team

| Player | School | Pos. | Yr. | Ht., Wt. | Hometown (Last School) |
|---|---|---|---|---|---|
| Ivan Kharchenkov | Arizona | F | So. | 6'7", 230 | Munich, Germany (Bayern Munich) |
| Motiejus Krivas | Arizona | C | Jr. | 7'2", 260 | Siauliai, Lithuania (BC Žalgiris) |
| Paulius Murauskas | Arizona State | F | Sr. | 6'8", 235 | Kaunas, Lithuania (St. Mary's) |
| Robert Wright III† | BYU | G | Jr. | 6'1", 183 | Wilmington, DE (Baylor) |
| Dedan Thomas Jr. | Houston | G | Sr. | 6'1", 180 | Las Vegas, NV (LSU) |
| Joseph Tugler | Houston | F | Sr. | 6'8", 230 | Houston, TX (Cypress Falls HS) |
| Tamin Lipsey | Iowa State | G | GS | 6'1", 200 | Ames, IA (Ames HS) |
| Tyran Stokes | Kansas | G | Fr. | 6'7", 230 | Louisville, KY (Rainer Beach HS) |
| Xavier Edmonds | TCU | F | Sr. | 6'8", 252 | Long Beach, CA (Salt Lake CC) |
| JT Toppin† | Texas Tech | F | Sr. | 6'9", 230 | Dallas, TX (New Mexico) |
† denotes unanimous selection Reference:

- Player of the Year: Motiejus Krivas, Arizona
- Co-Newcomer of the Year: Paulius Murauskas, Arizona State
- Freshman of the Year: Tyran Stokes, Kansas

== Roster ==
2026–27 Arizona State Sun Devils men's basketball team
Players
Coaches

| Pos. | # | Name | Height | Weight | Year | Previous school | Hometown |
|---|---|---|---|---|---|---|---|
| F | 1 | Marcus Vaughns | 6 ft 8 in (2.03 m) | 221 lb (100 kg) | So | LSU | Melbourne, Australia |
| G | 2 | Vijay Wallace | 6 ft 6 in (1.98 m) | 218 lb (99 kg) | Jr | Triton College | Chicago, IL |
| G | 3 | Joel Foxwell | 6 ft 1 in (1.85 m) | 180 lb (82 kg) | So | Portland | Melbourne, Australia |
| G | 4 | Bryce Ford | 6 ft 4 in (1.93 m) | 190 lb (86 kg) | Sr | Toledo | Scottsdale, AZ |
| G/F | 5 | Emmanuel Innocenti | 6 ft 5 in (1.96 m) | 200 lb (91 kg) | Sr | Gonzaga | Petit Badien, Ivory Coast |
| G | 6 | JRob Croy | 6 ft 6 in (1.98 m) | 190 lb (86 kg) | Fr | Riverside Polytechnic HS | Riverside, CA |
| G | 7 | Jokubas Rudaitis | 6 ft 5 in (1.96 m) | 190 lb (86 kg) | Fr | BC Žalgiris-2 | Kaunas, Lithuania |
| F | 8 | Jonathan Griman | 6 ft 11 in (2.11 m) | 215 lb (98 kg) | Sr | California Baptist | Caracas, Venezuela |
| F | 9 | Ajak Nyuon | 6 ft 10 in (2.08 m) | 195 lb (88 kg) | | BA Centre of Excellence | Canberra, Australia |
| G/F | 11 | Dillan Shaw | 6 ft 7 in (2.01 m) | 205 lb (93 kg) | So | Saint Mary's | Northridge, CA |
| C | 14 | Ben Defty | 7 ft 0 in (2.13 m) | 255 lb (116 kg) | Jr | Boston | Berlin, Germany |
| F | 23 | Paulius Murauskas | 6 ft 8 in (2.03 m) | 235 lb (107 kg) | Sr | Saint Mary's | Kaunas, Lithuania |
| C | 25 | Filip Malesevic | 7 ft 3 in (2.21 m) | 220 lb (100 kg) | Jr | FMP Beograd | Belgrade, Serbia |
| C | 35 | Nate Garcia | 7 ft 0 in (2.13 m) | 220 lb (100 kg) | So | California Baptist | Glendora, CA |

Head coach

- Randy Bennett (UC San Diego)

Assistant coach(es)

- Rick Croy (San Francisco State)
- David Patrick (Syracuse)
- Joe Rahon (Saint Mary's)
- E. J. Rowland (Saint Mary's)
- Casey Benson (Oregon)

Legend

- (C) Team captain
- (S) Suspended
- (I) Ineligible
- (W) Walk-on
- Injured
- Current redshirt

Roster

== Schedule and results ==
| Date time, TV | Rank^{#} | Opponent^{#} | Result | Record | High points | High rebounds | High assists | Site (attendance) city, state |
Exhibition
| October 25, 2026*; 1:00 p.m. | | at New Mexico | W 91–86 | | 31 – Murauskas | 9 – Murauskas | 7 – Foxwell | The Pit (7,447); Albuquerque, NM |
Non-conference regular season
| November 2, 2026*; 8:00 p.m., ESPN+ | | East Tennessee State | W 75–65 | 1–0 | 20 – Murauskas | 9 – Murauskas | 5 – Foxwell | Desert Financial Arena (5,353); Tempe, AZ |
| November 6, 2026*; 7:00 p.m., ESPN+ | | Northern Colorado | W 90–63 | 2–0 | 33 – Murauskas | 12 – Shaw | 8 – Foxwell | Desert Financial Arena (5,295); Tempe, AZ |
| November 10, 2026*; 7:00 p.m., ESPN+ | | Hofstra | W 85–63 | 3–0 | 22 – Murauskas | 11 – Murauskas | 6 – Foxwell | Desert Financial Arena (5,048); Tempe, AZ |
| November 13, 2026*; 7:00 p.m., ESPN+ | | Louisiana–Monroe | W 92–62 | 4–0 | 31 – Murauskas | 13 – Murauskas | 9 – Foxwell | Desert Financial Arena (5,351); Tempe, AZ |
| November 18, 2026*; 7:00 p.m., ESPN+ | | Oakland | W 68–65 | 5–0 | 23 – Murauskas | 12 – Shaw | 6 – Foxwell | Desert Financial Arena (4,942); Tempe, AZ |
| November 25, 2026*; 12:00 p.m., CBSSN | | vs. LSU; Acrisure Series – Palm Springs Pod 1 | | | | | | Acrisure Arena; Thousand Palms, CA |
| November 26, 2026*; 12:00 p.m., CBSSN | | vs. South Carolina; Acrisure Series – Palm Springs Pod 1 | | | | | | Acrisure Arena; Thousand Palms, CA |
| November 30, 2026*; 7:00 p.m., ESPN+ | | Montana | | | | | | Desert Financial Arena; Tempe, AZ |
| December 5, 2026*; 10:00 a.m., ESPNU | | vs. Oklahoma | | | | | | BOK Center; Tulsa, OK |
| December 8, 2026*; 8:00 p.m., ESPN+ | | Mercer | | | | | | Desert Financial Arena; Tempe, AZ |
| December 14, 2026*; 8:00 p.m., CBSSN | | at Oregon State | | | | | | Gill Coliseum; Corvallis, OR |
| December 20, 2026*; 5:00 p.m., ESPN+ | | San Diego | | | | | | Desert Financial Arena; Tempe, AZ |
| December 23, 2026*; 6:00 p.m., ESPN+ | | Idaho | | | | | | Desert Financial Arena; Tempe, AZ |
| December 29, 2026*; 7:00 p.m., ESPN+ | | Southern Illinois | | | | | | Desert Financial Arena; Tempe, AZ |
Big 12 regular season
| January 2, 2027; 8:00 p.m., ESPN2 | | BYU | | | | | | Desert Financial Arena; Tempe, AZ |
| January 5, 2027; 6:00 p.m., CBSSN | | at TCU | | | | | | Schollmaier Arena; Fort Worth, TX |
| January 9, 2027; 2:00 p.m., ESPN+ | | UCF | | | | | | Desert Financial Arena; Tempe, AZ |
| January 12, 2027; 8:00 p.m., FS1 | | at Texas Tech | | | | | | United Supermarkets Arena; Lubbock, TX |
| January 16, 2027; 4:00 p.m., ESPN/ESPN2 | | at Arizona; Rivalry | | | | | | McKale Center; Tucson, AZ |
| January 19, 2027; 6:00 p.m., CBSSN | | Kansas State | | | | | | Desert Financial Arena; Tempe, AZ |
| January 23, 2027; 6:00 p.m., ESPN/ESPN2/ESPNU | | Houston | | | | | | Desert Financial Arena; Tempe, AZ |
| January 27, 2027; 6:30 p.m., FS1 | | at West Virginia | | | | | | WVU Coliseum; Morgantown, WV |
| January 30, 2027; 5:00 p.m., Peacock | | at Cincinnati | | | | | | Fifth Third Arena; Cincinnati, OH |
| February 6, 2027; 7:00 p.m., CBSSN | | TCU | | | | | | Desert Financial Arena; Tempe, AZ |
| February 9, 2027; 7:00 p.m., Peacock | | at Kansas | | | | | | Allen Fieldhouse; Lawrence, KS |
| February 13, 2027; 6:00 p.m., FOX | | Arizona; Rivalry | | | | | | Desert Financial Arena; Tempe, AZ |
| February 16, 2027; 7:00 p.m., CBSSN | | at Kansas State | | | | | | Bramlage Coliseum; Manhattan, KS |
| February 19, 2027; 8:00 p.m., FS1 | | Iowa State | | | | | | Desert Financial Arena; Tempe, AZ |
| February 23, 2027; 9:00 p.m., ESPN2 | | Utah | | | | | | Desert Financial Arena; Tempe, AZ |
| February 27, 2027; 1:00 p.m., TNT/TruTV | | at Colorado | | | | | | CU Events Center; Boulder, CO |
| March 2, 2027; 8:30 p.m., FS1 | | Baylor | | | | | | Desert Financial Arena; Tempe, AZ |
| March 6, 2027; 3:00 p.m., Peacock | | at Oklahoma State | | | | | | Gallagher-Iba Arena; Stillwater, OK |
Big 12 tournament
| March 9–13, 2027; TBD, ESPN+/ESPN | | vs. TBD; First Round | | | | | | T-Mobile Center; Kansas City, MO |
*Non-conference game. ^{#}Rankings from AP poll. (#) Tournament seedings in parentheses. All times are in Mountain Time.
