= 2026–27 Chattanooga Mocs men's basketball team =

American college basketball season

2026–27 Chattanooga Mocs men's basketball
- Conference: Southern Conference
- Record: 3–2 (0–0 SoCon)
- Head coach: Dan Earl (5th season)
- Associate head coach: Ander Galfsky
- Assistant coaches: Tom Kiely; Ricardo Rush Jr.; Logan Dahms; Alan Treakle
- Home arena: McKenzie Arena

2026–27 Southern Conference men's basketball standings
	Conf.				Overall
Team	W		L	PCT	W		L	PCT
Furman	0	–	0	–	5	–	1	.833
Tennessee Tech	0	–	0	–	4	–	2	.667
Chattanooga	0	–	0	–	3	–	2	.600
The Citadel	0	–	0	–	3	–	2	.600
UNC Greensboro	0	–	0	–	3	–	2	.600
VMI	0	–	0	–	3	–	3	.500
Wofford	0	–	0	–	3	–	3	.500
Samford	0	–	0	–	2	–	2	.500
Western Carolina	0	–	0	–	2	–	3	.400
Mercer	0	–	0	–	2	–	4	.333
East Tennessee State	0	–	0	–	1	–	3	.250
† 2027 SoCon tournament winner As of November 20, 2026; Rankings from AP poll

The 2026–27 Chattanooga Mocs men's basketball team will represent the University of Tennessee at Chattanooga during the 2026–27 NCAA Division I men's basketball season. The Mocs will be led by fifth-year head coach Dan Earl and will play their home games at McKenzie Arena in Chattanooga, Tennessee as members of the Southern Conference (SoCon).

== Previous season ==
The Mocs finished the 2025–26 season 13–19, 7–11 in SoCon play, to finish in a tie for eighth place. As the No. 8 seed in the SoCon tournament, they were defeated by The Citadel in the first round.

== Preseason ==
On October 7, 2026, the SoCon released their preseason coaches' poll. Chattanooga was picked to finish fifth in the conference.

=== Preseason rankings ===
SoCon Preseason Poll
Place	Team	Points
1	Furman	100 (10)
2	East Tennessee State	86 (1)
3	Wofford	78
4	Samford	70
5	Chattanooga	59
6	Tennessee Tech	57
7	Mercer	47
8	Western Carolina	41
9	VMI	32
10	The Citadel	21
11	UNC Greensboro	13
(#) first-place votes

=== Preseason All-SoCon Team ===
Preseason All-SoCon Team
Player	Year	Position
Tate Darner	Sophomore	Guard

== Roster ==
2026–27 Chattanooga Mocs men's basketball team
Players
Coaches

Pos.	#	Name	Height	Weight	Year	Previous school	Hometown
G	0	Tate Darner	6 ft 4 in (1.93 m)	180 lb (82 kg)	So	Santa Fe Catholic High School	Lakeland, Florida
G	1	Matt Hampton	6 ft 4 in (1.93 m)	180 lb (82 kg)	Jr	Three Rivers College	Frisco, Texas
F	2	Anthony Swift	6 ft 7 in (2.01 m)	210 lb (95 kg)	Sr	Nebraska–Kearney	Las Vegas, Nevada
G	3	Tre Powell	6 ft 0 in (1.83 m)	170 lb (77 kg)	Jr	Goldey–Beacom	Mount Laurel, New Jersey
G	4	Zach Bleshoy	6 ft 4 in (1.93 m)	200 lb (91 kg)	RS Fr	Pope High School	Marietta, Georgia
G	5	Kobe McDowell-White	6 ft 0 in (1.83 m)	190 lb (86 kg)	Fr	Cairns Marlins	Brisbane, Australia
F	6	Caleb Hardaway	6 ft 7 in (2.01 m)	220 lb (100 kg)	Fr	Boyd-Buchanan School	Chattanooga, Tennessee
G/F	7	Sean Cusano	6 ft 9 in (2.06 m)	215 lb (98 kg)	Sr	Hilton Head Prep	Hilton Head, South Carolina
G	11	Christian Matos	6 ft 3 in (1.91 m)	165 lb (75 kg)	Fr	Sunrise Christian Academy	Philadelphia, Pennsylvania
G/F	12	Lenny Anigbata	6 ft 7 in (2.01 m)	200 lb (91 kg)	Fr	Riesen Ludwigsburg	Munich, Germany
G	13	Houston Holland	6 ft 3 in (1.91 m)	195 lb (88 kg)	Jr	Silverdale Baptist Academy	Chattanooga, Tennessee
F	18	Yonatan Levy	6 ft 10 in (2.08 m)	260 lb (118 kg)	Jr	Pepperdine	Hod HaSharon, Israel
G/F	20	Liam Vitters	6 ft 5 in (1.96 m)	220 lb (100 kg)	Jr	The Kiski School	Arlington, Virginia
F/C	30	Josh Bowman	6 ft 9 in (2.06 m)	220 lb (100 kg)	So	Huntsville High School	Huntsville, Alabama
G	33	Yssam Moungalla	6 ft 6 in (1.98 m)	170 lb (77 kg)	Fr	AS Monaco Basket	Paris, France
C	34	John Fleeman	7 ft 0 in (2.13 m)	275 lb (125 kg)	Fr	Kingsville High School	Kingsville, Missouri
F	44	Tyler Houser	6 ft 9 in (2.06 m)	225 lb (102 kg)	Sr	Delaware	Camp Hill, Pennsylvania

Head coach

- Dan Earl (Penn State)

Assistant coach(es)

- Ander Galfsky (Birmingham–Southern)
- Tom Kiely (Seton Hall)
- Ricardo Rush Jr. (Maryland)
- Logan Dahms (Texas A&M)
- Alan Treakle (Mount Olive)

Legend

- (C) Team captain
- (S) Suspended
- (I) Ineligible
- (W) Walk-on
- Injured
- Current redshirt

Roster
Last update: October 16, 2026

== Schedule and results ==
Date time, TV	Rank^{#}	Opponent^{#}	Result	Record	Site (attendance) city, state
Non-conference regular season
November 2, 2026*; 9:00 p.m., ACCN		at No. 11 Louisville	L 70–84	0–1	KFC Yum! Center (13,017); Louisville, KY
November 5, 2026*; 6:00 p.m., BTN		at Penn State	L 93–97	0–2	Bryce Jordan Center (4,935); State College, PA
November 9, 2026*; 7:00 p.m., ESPN+		Covenant	W 97–67	1–2	McKenzie Arena (3,219); Chattanooga, TN
November 13, 2026*; 7:00 p.m., FloCollege		at Elon	W 77–70	2–2	Schar Center (1,534); Elon, NC
November 18, 2026*; 7:00 p.m., ESPN+		at Winthrop	W 90–79	3–2	Winthrop Coliseum (1,326); Rock Hill, SC
November 21, 2026*; 7:00 p.m., ESPN+		Radford			McKenzie Arena; Chattanooga, TN
November 24, 2026*; 7:00 p.m., ESPN+		Delaware State			McKenzie Arena; Chattanooga, TN
November 28, 2026*; 2:00 p.m., ESPN+		Troy			McKenzie Arena; Chattanooga, TN
December 1, 2026*; 7:00 p.m., ESPN+		Alabama A&M			McKenzie Arena; Chattanooga, TN
December 5, 2026*; 2:00 p.m., ESPN+		Brescia			McKenzie Arena; Chattanooga, TN
December 8, 2026*; 7:00 p.m., ESPN+		Point			McKenzie Arena; Chattanooga, TN
December 16, 2026*; 7:30 p.m., ESPN+		South Carolina State			McKenzie Arena; Chattanooga, TN
SoCon regular season
December 19, 2026; 2:00 p.m., ESPN+		Mercer			McKenzie Arena; Chattanooga, TN
December 22, 2026; 7:00 p.m., ESPN+		Samford			McKenzie Arena; Chattanooga, TN
December 30, 2026; 1:00 p.m., ESPN+		at Western Carolina			Ramsey Center; Cullowhee, NC
January 2, 2027; TBA, ESPN+		at The Citadel			McAlister Field House; Charleston, SC
January 7, 2027; 7:00 p.m., ESPN+		UNC Greensboro			McKenzie Arena; Chattanooga, TN
January 9, 2027; 2:00 p.m., ESPN+		VMI			McKenzie Arena; Chattanooga, TN
January 16, 2027; 5:00 p.m., ESPN+		at Wofford			Jerry Richardson Indoor Stadium; Spartanburg, SC
January 18, 2027; 7:00 p.m., ESPN+		Tennesee Tech			McKenzie Arena; Chattanooga, TN
January 21, 2027; 7:00 p.m., ESPN+		at East Tennessee State			Freedom Hall Civic Center; Johnson City, TN
January 23, 2027; 4:30 p.m., ESPN+		Western Carolina			McKenzie Arena; Chattanooga, TN
January 28, 2027; 6:00 p.m., ESPN+		at VMI			Cameron Hall; Lexington, VA
January 30, 2027; 4:00 p.m., ESPN+		at UNC Greensboro			Bodford Arena; Greensboro, NC
February 3, 2027; 7:00 p.m., ESPN+		East Tennessee State			McKenzie Arena; Chattanooga, TN
February 6, 2027; 4:30 p.m., ESPN+		Wofford			McKenzie Arena; Chattanooga, TN
February 10, 2027; 6:30 p.m., ESPN+		at Furman			Timmons Arena; Greenville, SC
February 13, 2027; 2:00 p.m., ESPN+		The Citadel			McKenzie Arena; Chattanooga, TN
February 18, 2027; 7:30 p.m., ESPN+		at Samford			Pete Hanna Center; Homewood, AL
February 20, 2027; 2:00 p.m., ESPN+		at Mercer			Hawkins Arena; Macon, GA
February 24, 2027; 2:00 p.m., ESPN+		Furman			McKenzie Arena; Chattanooga, TN
February 27, 2027; 7:30 p.m., ESPN+		at Tennessee Tech			Eblen Center; Cookeville, TN
SoCon tournament
March 4–5, 2027		vs. TBD			Harrah's Cherokee Center; Asheville, NC
*Non-conference game. ^{#}Rankings from AP Poll. (#) Tournament seedings in parentheses. All times are in Eastern.
