= 2026–27 Samford Bulldogs men's basketball team =

American college basketball season

2026–27 Samford Bulldogs men's basketball
- Conference: Southern Conference
- Record: 2–2 (0–0 SoCon)
- Head coach: Lennie Acuff (2nd season)
- Associate head coach: William Small
- Assistant coaches: Kip Owens; Will Acuff; Peyton Mattingly; Jake Delaney
- Home arena: Pete Hanna Center

2026–27 Southern Conference men's basketball standings
	Conf.				Overall
Team	W		L	PCT	W		L	PCT
Furman	0	–	0	–	5	–	1	.833
Tennessee Tech	0	–	0	–	4	–	2	.667
Chattanooga	0	–	0	–	3	–	2	.600
The Citadel	0	–	0	–	3	–	2	.600
UNC Greensboro	0	–	0	–	3	–	2	.600
VMI	0	–	0	–	3	–	3	.500
Wofford	0	–	0	–	3	–	3	.500
Samford	0	–	0	–	2	–	2	.500
Western Carolina	0	–	0	–	2	–	3	.400
Mercer	0	–	0	–	2	–	4	.333
East Tennessee State	0	–	0	–	1	–	3	.250
† 2027 SoCon tournament winner As of November 20, 2026; Rankings from AP poll

The 2026–27 Samford Bulldogs men's basketball team represents Samford University during the 2026–27 NCAA Division I men's basketball season. The Bulldogs, led by second-year head coach Lennie Acuff, play their home games at the Pete Hanna Center in Homewood, Alabama as members of the Southern Conference (SoCon).

== Previous season ==
The Bulldogs finished the 2025–26 season 18–14, 11–7 in SoCon play, to finish in a tie for second place. They were defeated by Furman in the quarterfinals of the SoCon tournament.

== Preseason ==
On October 7, 2026, the SoCon released their preseason coaches' poll. Samford was picked to finish fourth in the conference.

=== Preseason rankings ===
SoCon Preseason Poll
Place	Team	Points
1	Furman	100 (10)
2	East Tennessee State	86 (1)
3	Wofford	78
4	Samford	70
5	Chattanooga	59
6	Tennessee Tech	57
7	Mercer	47
8	Western Carolina	41
9	VMI	32
10	The Citadel	21
11	UNC Greensboro	13
(#) first-place votes

=== Preseason All-SoCon Team ===
Preseason All-SoCon Team
Player	Year	Position
Cooper Noard	Graduate	Guard

== Roster ==
2026–27 Samford Bulldogs men's basketball team
Players
Coaches

Pos.	#	Name	Height	Weight	Year	Previous school	Hometown
G	0	Win Miller	6 ft 3 in (1.91 m)	190 lb (86 kg)	Sr	Belmont	Vestavia Hills, Alabama
G	1	Cooper Noard	6 ft 2 in (1.88 m)	200 lb (91 kg)	Sr	Cornell	Glenview, Illinois
G	3	Isaiah Campbell-Finch	6 ft 0 in (1.83 m)	165 lb (75 kg)	So	Tampa Catholic High School	Tampa, Florida
F	4	Judson Bjornstad	6 ft 8 in (2.03 m)	200 lb (91 kg)	Jr	Union	Murfreesboro, Tennessee
G	5	Cade Norris	6 ft 4 in (1.93 m)	200 lb (91 kg)	Jr	Illinois State	Hilliard, Ohio
G	7	JD Gossett	6 ft 5 in (1.96 m)	185 lb (84 kg)	RS Fr	Huntsville High School	Huntsville, Alabama
G	9	Ty Davis	6 ft 4 in (1.93 m)	190 lb (86 kg)	Jr	Creighton	Mountain Brook, Alabama
G	10	Najimi George	6 ft 4 in (1.93 m)	205 lb (93 kg)	Jr	New Haven	Bridgeport, Connecticut
G	11	Cooper Davenport	5 ft 11 in (1.8 m)	160 lb (73 kg)	So	Henderson County High School	Henderson, Kentucky
F	13	Braeden Macvicar	6 ft 11 in (2.11 m)	235 lb (107 kg)	RS Jr	Coastal Carolina	Port Williams, Nova Scotia
G	14	Brandon Fussell	6 ft 1 in (1.85 m)	175 lb (79 kg)	Sr	Montevallo	Guntersville, Alabama
G	21	Corey Brown	6 ft 4 in (1.93 m)	175 lb (79 kg)	Sr	Landmark Christian School	Fairburn, Georgia
F	22	Bradley Kemp	6 ft 7 in (2.01 m)	205 lb (93 kg)	So	Mount Paran Christian School	Kennesaw, Georgia
F	23	Caleb Harrison	6 ft 9 in (2.06 m)	205 lb (93 kg)	RS So	Huntsville High School	Huntsville, Alabama
F	31	Joshua Hughes	6 ft 5 in (1.96 m)	215 lb (98 kg)	GS	Etowah High School	Woodstock, Georgia
C	32	Lawson Lee	6 ft 11 in (2.11 m)	220 lb (100 kg)	Fr	Battle Ground Academy	Franklin, Tennessee
G	33	Zach Lamey	6 ft 5 in (1.96 m)	195 lb (88 kg)	RS Jr	Lipscomb	Birmingham, Alabama
C	35	Will Shaver	6 ft 10 in (2.08 m)	265 lb (120 kg)	RS Sr	UAB	Birmingham, Alabama

Head coach

- Lennie Acuff (Shorter)

Assistant coach(es)

- William Small (Belhaven)
- Kip Owens (Alabama–Huntsville)
- Will Acuff (Alabama–Huntsville)
- Peyton Mattingly (Lipscomb)
- Jake Delaney (Covenant)

Legend

- (C) Team captain
- (S) Suspended
- (I) Ineligible
- (W) Walk-on
- Injured
- Current redshirt

Roster
Last update: November 2, 2026

== Schedule and results ==
Date time, TV	Rank^{#}	Opponent^{#}	Result	Record	Site (attendance) city, state
Exhibition
October 13, 2026*; 7:00 p.m.		vs. Alabama A&M; Ballin In Boutwell	W 71–61	–	Boutwell Memorial Auditorium (1,144); Birmingham, AL
October 26, 2026*; 6:00 p.m.		at Jacksonville State	W 80–75	–	Pete Mathews Coliseum; Jacksonville, AL
October 29, 2026*; 7:00 p.m.		at Auburn	L 68–80	–	Neville Arena; Auburn, AL
Regular season
November 2, 2026*; 6:30 p.m., ESPN+		Berry	W 87–58	1–0	Pete Hanna Center; Homewood, AL
November 7, 2026*; 3:00 p.m., MW+		at UNLV	L 79–88	1–1	Thomas & Mack Center (4,122); Paradise, NV
November 13, 2026*; 7:00 p.m., ESPN+		Wright State	L 66–90	1–2	Pete Hanna Center (1,627); Homewood, AL
November 18, 2026*; 5:30 p.m., ESPN+		vs. USC Upstate	W 74–64	2–2	Timmons Arena; Greenville, SC
November 22, 2026*; 4:00 p.m., ESPN+		UNC Asheville			Pete Hanna Center; Homewood, AL
November 24, 2026*; 6:00 p.m., ACCNX		at Georgia Tech			McCamish Pavilion; Atlanta, GA
November 29, 2026*; 4:00 p.m., ESPN+		Point			Pete Hanna Center; Homewood, AL
December 2, 2026*; 6:30 p.m., ESPN+		at UAB			Bartow Arena; Birmingham, AL
December 5, 2026; 4:00 p.m.		at Tennessee Tech			Eblen Center; Cookeville, TN
December 12, 2026*; 6:00 p.m., ESPN+		at Presbyterian			Templeton Center; Clinton, SC
December 15, 2026*; 11:00 a.m., ESPN+		Bryan			Pete Hanna Center; Homewood, AL
December 19, 2026; 4:00 p.m., ESPN+		Wofford			Pete Hanna Center; Homewood, AL
December 22, 2026; 6:00 p.m., ESPN+		at Chattanooga			McKenzie Arena; Chattanooga, TN
December 29, 2026*; 9:00 p.m., SECN		at Alabama			Coleman Coliseum; Tuscaloosa, AL
December 30, 2026*; 6:30 p.m., ESPN+		Covenant			Pete Hanna Center; Homewood, AL
January 2, 2027; 4:00 p.m., ESPN+		East Tennessee State			Pete Hanna Center; Homewood, AL
January 6, 2027; 5:30 p.m., ESPN+		at Furman			Timmons Arena; Greenville, SC
January 9, 2027; 4:00 p.m., ESPN+		The Citadel			Pete Hanna Center; Homewood, AL
January 11, 2027; 6:00 p.m., ESPN2		at Mercer			Hawkins Arena; Macon, GA
January 16, 2027; 12:00 p.m., ESPN+		at Western Carolina			Ramsey Center; Cullowhee, NC
January 18, 2027; 6:30 p.m., ESPN+		VMI			Pete Hanna Center; Homewood, AL
January 21, 2027; 6:30 p.m., ESPN+		UNC Greensboro			Pete Hanna Center; Homewood, AL
January 23, 2027; 4:00 p.m., ESPN+		at The Citadel			McAlister Field House; Charleston, SC
January 30, 2027; 1:00 p.m., ESPN+		at Wofford			Jerry Richardson Indoor Stadium; Spartanburg, SC
February 3, 2027; 6:30 p.m., ESPN+		Furman			Pete Hanna Center; Homewood, AL
February 7, 2027; 3:00 p.m., CBSSN		Western Carolina			Pete Hanna Center; Homewood, AL
February 11, 2027; 6:00 p.m., ESPN+		at UNC Greensboro			Bodford Arena; Greensboro, NC
February 13, 2027; 12:00 p.m., ESPN+		at VMI			Cameron Hall; Lexington, VA
February 17, 2027; 5:00 p.m., CBSSN		Chattanooga			Pete Hanna Center; Homewood, AL
February 20, 2027; 6:30 p.m., ESPN+		Tennessee Tech			Pete Hanna Center; Homewood, AL
February 24, 2027; 6:30 p.m., ESPN+		Mercer			Pete Hanna Center; Homewood, AL
February 27, 2027; 9:00 a.m., CBSSN		at East Tennessee State			Freedom Hall Civic Center; Johnson City, TN
SoCon tournament
March 4–5, 2027		vs.			Harrah's Cherokee Center; Asheville, NC
*Non-conference game. ^{#}Rankings from AP Poll. (#) Tournament seedings in parentheses. All times are in Central.
