= 2026–27 Furman Paladins men's basketball team =

American college basketball season

2026–27 Furman Paladins men's basketball
- Conference: Southern Conference
- Record: 3–0 (0–0 SoCon)
- Head coach: Bob Richey (10th season)
- Associate head coach: Pat Estepp
- Assistant coaches: Riley Conroy; Casey Long; Jordan Lyons; Rett Lister
- Home arena: Timmons Arena

2026–27 Southern Conference men's basketball standings
	Conf.				Overall
Team	W		L	PCT	W		L	PCT
Furman	0	–	0	–	4	–	1	.800
The Citadel	0	–	0	–	3	–	2	.600
Tennessee Tech	0	–	0	–	3	–	2	.600
VMI	0	–	0	–	3	–	2	.600
Chattanooga	0	–	0	–	2	–	2	.500
UNC Greensboro	0	–	0	–	2	–	2	.500
Western Carolina	0	–	0	–	2	–	2	.500
Wofford	0	–	0	–	2	–	3	.400
Mercer	0	–	0	–	2	–	3	.400
East Tennessee State	0	–	0	–	1	–	2	.333
Samford	0	–	0	–	1	–	2	.333
† 2027 SoCon tournament winner As of November 18, 2026; Rankings from AP poll

The 2026–27 Furman Paladins men's basketball team represent Furman University during the 2026–27 NCAA Division I men's basketball season. The Paladins, led by tenth-year head coach Bob Richey, play their home games at Timmons Arena in Greenville, South Carolina as members of the Southern Conference (SoCon).

== Previous season ==
The Paladins finished the 2024–25 season 22–13, 10–8 in SoCon play, to finish in tie for fifth place. They defeated Samford, UNC Greensboro, and East Tennessee State to win the SoCon tournament championship, earning the Paladins their first trip to the NCAA tournament since 2023. In the NCAA tournament, Furman would receive the #15 seed in the East Region, where they would lose in the First Round to #2 region seed UConn.

== Preseason ==
On October 7, 2026, the SoCon released their preseason coaches poll. Furman was picked to finish atop the conference, while receiving ten first-place votes.

=== Preseason rankings ===
SoCon Preseason Poll
Place	Team	Points
1	Furman	100 (10)
2	East Tennessee State	86 (1)
3	Wofford	78
4	Samford	70
5	Chattanooga	59
6	Tennessee Tech	57
7	Mercer	47
8	Western Carolina	41
9	VMI	32
10	The Citadel	21
11	UNC Greensboro	13
(#) first-place votes

=== Preseason All-SoCon Team ===
Preseason All-SoCon Team
Player	Year	Position
Marcus Kell	Graduate	Forward
Charles Johnston	5th Year	Forward

== Roster ==
2026–27 Furman Paladins men's basketball team
Players
Coaches

Pos.	#	Name	Height	Weight	Year	Previous school	Hometown
F	0	Jordan Butler	7 ft 0 in (2.13 m)	237 lb (108 kg)	Sr	South Carolina	Greenville, SC
F	1	Charles Johnston	6 ft 11 in (2.11 m)	225 lb (102 kg)	GS	Cal State Monterey Bay	Sydney, Australia
G	2	Abijah Franklin	6 ft 5 in (1.96 m)	180 lb (82 kg)	So	Wren High School	Greenville, SC
G	3	Jaxson Bell	6 ft 2 in (1.88 m)	211 lb (96 kg)	Jr	Army	Suwanee, GA
G	4	Jerrin Samuel	6 ft 5 in (1.96 m)	175 lb (79 kg)	Fr	Winder-Barrow High School	Winder, GA
G	5	Cole Bowser	6 ft 6 in (1.98 m)	200 lb (91 kg)	So	DeMatha Catholic High School	Bowie, MD
G	6	Nate Wilbourne	6 ft 3 in (1.91 m)	165 lb (75 kg)	Fr	Mauldin High School	Mauldin, SC
F	7	Mason Smith	6 ft 7 in (2.01 m)	200 lb (91 kg)	Jr	Davidson Day School	Huntersville, NC
G	8	Collin O'Neal	6 ft 4 in (1.93 m)	200 lb (91 kg)	So	Montgomery Bell Academy	Nashville, TN
G	10	Luka Toews	6 ft 1 in (1.85 m)	190 lb (86 kg)	Jr	Boston College	Tokyo, Japan
G	11	Cameron Elwer	6 ft 2 in (1.88 m)	190 lb (86 kg)	Fr	Delphos St. John's High School	Delphos, OH
F	15	Owen Ritger	6 ft 9 in (2.06 m)	218 lb (99 kg)	So	Marist School	Atlanta, GA
F	23	Marcus Kell	6 ft 8 in (2.03 m)	213 lb (97 kg)	GS	Western Carolina	Fort Mill, SC
F	35	Nikos Koulisianis	6 ft 9 in (2.06 m)	190 lb (86 kg)	Fr	Montverde Academy	Brno, Czechia
G	44	Gunnar Lewis	5 ft 10 in (1.78 m)	165 lb (75 kg)	So	Christ Presbyterian Academy	Cottontown, TN
F	77	Davis Molnar	6 ft 6 in (1.98 m)	215 lb (98 kg)	RS Sr	Terry Sanford High School	Fayetteville, NC

Head coach

- Bob Richey (North Greenville)

Assistant coach(es)

- Pat Estepp (Cedarville)
- Riley Conroy (Tulane)
- Casey Long (Chattanooga)
- Jordan Lyons (Furman)
- Rett Lister (Furman)

Legend

- (C) Team captain
- (S) Suspended
- (I) Ineligible
- (W) Walk-on
- Injured
- Current redshirt

Roster
Last update: October 29, 2026

== Schedule and results ==
Date time, TV	Rank^{#}	Opponent^{#}	Result	Record	Site (attendance) city, state
Exhibition
October 8, 2026*; 5:30 p.m.		at No. 20 Alabama	L 93–111		Coleman Coliseum (3,259); Tuscaloosa, AL
October 18, 2026*; 4:00 p.m.		Georgia Southern	W 85–78		Timmons Arena (1,697); Greenville, SC
October 25, 2026*; 4:00 p.m.		at Charleston	L 83–89		TD Arena; Charleston, SC
Non-conference regular season
November 2, 2026*; 8:00 p.m., YouTube		vs. Bethune–Cookman; Field of 68 Opening Day Marathon	W 79–70	1–0	Sanford Pentagon (437); Rock Hill, SC
November 4, 2026*; 7:30 p.m.		Bob Jones	W 121–52	2–0	Timmons Arena (1,897); Greenville, SC
November 7, 2026*; 4:00 p.m., ESPN+		Northern Iowa	W 98–83	3–0	Timmons Arena (2,107); Greenville, SC
November 11, 2026*; 7:00 p.m., ESPN+		at Holy Cross	W 80-67	4-0	Hart Center (1,003); Worcester, MA
November 14, 2026*; 8:30 p.m., ESPN+		at Belmont	L 62-72	4-1	Curb Event Center (1,471); Nashville, TN
November 18, 2026*; 8:30 p.m., ESPN+		at Radford			Dedmon Center; Radford, VA
November 21, 2026*; 4:00 p.m.		Clinton (SC)			Timmons Arena; Greenville, SC
November 24, 2026*; 6:30 p.m., ESPN+		Elon			Timmons Arena; Greenville, SC
November 28, 2026*; 4:00 p.m., ESPN+		Austin Peay			Timmons Arena; Greenville, SC
December 1, 2026*; 7:00 p.m., ESPN+		at Troy			Trojan Arena; Troy, AL
December 5, 2026; 2:00 p.m., ESPN+		at UNC Greensboro			Bodford Arena; Greensboro, NC
December 12, 2026*; 4:00 p.m., ESPN+		North Carolina A&T			Timmons Arena; Greenville, SC
December 16, 2026*; 6:30 p.m.		Tennessee Wesleyan			Timmons Arena; Greenville, SC
SoCon regular season
December 19, 2026; 4:00 p.m., ESPN+		Western Carolina			Timmons Arena; Greenville, SC
December 22, 2026; 7:00 p.m., ESPN+		at East Tennessee State			Freedom Hall Civic Center; Johnson City, TN
December 30, 2026; 6:30 p.m., ESPN+		at VMI			Cameron Hall; Lexington, VA
January 2, 2027; 4:00 p.m., ESPN+		Tennessee Tech			Timmons Arena; Greenville, SC
January 6, 2027; 6:30 p.m., ESPN+		Samford			Timmons Arena; Greenville, SC
January 13, 2027; 7:00 p.m., ESPN+		at The Citadel			McAlister Field House; Charleston, SC
January 16, 2027; 4:00 p.m., ESPN+		Mercer			Timmons Arena; Greenville, SC
January 19, 2027; 6:00 p.m., CBSSN		Wofford			Timmons Arena; Greenville, SC
January 23, 2027; 5:00 p.m., ESPN+		at Tennessee Tech			Hooper Eblen Center; Cookeville, TN
January 27, 2027; 6:30 p.m., ESPN+		The Citadel			Timmons Arena; Greenville, SC
January 31, 2027; 12:00 p.m., ESPN2		East Tennessee State			Timmons Arena; Greenville, SC
February 3, 2027; 7:30 p.m., ESPN+		at Samford			Pete Hanna Center; Birmingham, AL
February 6, 2027; 4:30 p.m., ESPN+		at Mercer			Hawkins Arena; Macon, GA
February 11, 2027; 5:00 p.m., CBSSN		Chattanooga			Timmons Arena; Greenville, SC
February 13, 2027; 10:00 a.m., CBSSN		at Western Carolina			Ramsey Center; Cullowhee, NC
February 18, 2027; 6:30 p.m., ESPN+		VMI			Timmons Arena; Greenville, SC
February 20, 2027; 4:00 p.m., CBSSN		at Wofford			Jerry Richardson Indoor Stadium; Spartanburg, SC
February 24, 2027; 7:00 p.m., ESPN+		at Chattanooga			McKenzie Arena; Chattanooga, TN
February 27, 2027; 4:00 p.m., ESPN+		UNC Greensboro			Timmons Arena; Greenville, SC
SoCon tournament
March 4–5, 2027		vs. TBD			Harrah's Cherokee Center; Asheville, NC
*Non-conference game. ^{#}Rankings from AP poll. (#) Tournament seedings in parentheses. All times are in Eastern.
