= 2026–27 The Citadel Bulldogs basketball team =

American college basketball season

2026–27 The Citadel Bulldogs basketball
- Conference: Southern Conference
- Record: 4–2 (0–0 SoCon)
- Head coach: Ed Conroy (5th season, 9th overall season)
- Assistant coaches: Cameron Wells; Del Harris; Andrew Glover; Brady Schuck
- Home arena: McAlister Field House

2026–27 Southern Conference men's basketball standings
	Conf.				Overall
Team	W		L	PCT	W		L	PCT
Furman	0	–	0	–	5	–	1	.833
The Citadel	0	–	0	–	4	–	2	.667
Tennessee Tech	0	–	0	–	4	–	2	.667
Chattanooga	0	–	0	–	3	–	2	.600
UNC Greensboro	0	–	0	–	3	–	2	.600
VMI	0	–	0	–	3	–	3	.500
Wofford	0	–	0	–	3	–	3	.500
Samford	0	–	0	–	2	–	2	.500
Western Carolina	0	–	0	–	2	–	3	.400
Mercer	0	–	0	–	2	–	4	.333
East Tennessee State	0	–	0	–	1	–	3	.250
† 2027 SoCon tournament winner As of November 21, 2026; Rankings from AP poll

The 2026–27 The Citadel Bulldogs basketball team represent The Citadel during the 2026–27 NCAA Division I men's basketball season. The Bulldogs are led by head coach Ed Conroy in the fifth season of his second stint with the team, and his ninth season overall. They play their home games at McAlister Field House in Charleston, South Carolina as members of the Southern Conference (SoCon).

== Previous season ==
The Bulldogs finished the 2025–26 season 11–22, 7–11 in SoCon play, to finish in a tie for eighth place. They defeated Chattanooga in the first round of the SoCon tournament, but lost to top-seeded East Tennessee State in the quarterfinals.

== Preseason ==
On October 7, 2026, the SoCon released their preseason coaches poll. The Citadel was picked to finish tenth in the conference.

=== Preseason rankings ===
SoCon Preseason Poll
Place	Team	Points
1	Furman	100 (10)
2	East Tennessee State	86 (1)
3	Wofford	78
4	Samford	70
5	Chattanooga	59
6	Tennessee Tech	57
7	Mercer	47
8	Western Carolina	41
9	VMI	32
10	The Citadel	21
11	UNC Greensboro	13
(#) first-place votes

=== Preseason All-SoCon Team ===
No players were named to the Preseason All-SoCon Team.

== Roster ==
2026–27 The Citadel Bulldogs men's basketball team
Players
Coaches

Pos.	#	Name	Height	Weight	Year	Previous school	Hometown
G	0	Jameson Heck	5 ft 7 in (1.7 m)	170 lb (77 kg)	So	St. Francis de Sales School	Waterville, Ohio
G	1	Chase Cormier	6 ft 2 in (1.88 m)	185 lb (84 kg)	RS Sr	Iona	Atlanta, Georgia
G	2	Eddrin Bronson	6 ft 4 in (1.93 m)	185 lb (84 kg)	Sr	Furman	Tampa, Florida
G	3	Marcos Gonzales	6 ft 3 in (1.91 m)	180 lb (82 kg)	So	Brother Rice High School	Chicago, Illinois
F/C	4	Jor Hurlburt	6 ft 11 in (2.11 m)	240 lb (109 kg)	RS Sr	Davidson	Enderlin, North Dakota
G	5	Ja'Yon Alexander	6 ft 2 in (1.88 m)	180 lb (82 kg)	Fr	SPIRE Academy	Rochester, New York
F	7	Ramel Bethea	6 ft 9 in (2.06 m)	190 lb (86 kg)	Jr	Green Bay	Fort Washington, Maryland
F	8	Aaron Ekwere	6 ft 6 in (1.98 m)	205 lb (93 kg)	Fr	Pantterit Helsinki	Helsinki, Finland
F	10	Tyler Mrus	6 ft 7 in (2.01 m)	205 lb (93 kg)	RS Sr	BYU	Bothell, Washington
G	11	Colin McKenzie	6 ft 6 in (1.98 m)	200 lb (91 kg)	RS Sr	South Carolina State	Charleston, South Carolina
G	12	Marcus Banks	6 ft 2 in (1.88 m)	190 lb (86 kg)	Sr	Shepherd	Clinton, Maryland
F	13	Aidan Alexander	6 ft 4 in (1.93 m)	180 lb (82 kg)	RS So	Bishop England High School	Charleston, South Carolina
G	22	Keynan Davis	6 ft 5 in (1.96 m)	205 lb (93 kg)	Sr	Spire Academy	Chicago, Illinois
F	24	Jack Seiders	6 ft 7 in (2.01 m)	190 lb (86 kg)	Fr	Westlake High School	Austin, Texas
F	25	Cassius Bonjasky	6 ft 7 in (2.01 m)	230 lb (104 kg)	RS Sr	New Mexico Military Institute	Almere, Netherlands
F	30	Logan Menefee	6 ft 10 in (2.08 m)	215 lb (98 kg)	So	Ridge Point High School	Missouri City, Texas
C	35	Yaw Ansong	7 ft 0 in (2.13 m)	210 lb (95 kg)	Fr	Union Catholic High School	Accra, Ghana

Head coach

- Ed Conroy (The Citadel)

Assistant coach(es)

- Cameron Wells (The Citadel)
- Del Harris (Virginia State)
- Andrew Glover (South Carolina)
- Brady Schuck (Furman)

Legend

- (C) Team captain
- (S) Suspended
- (I) Ineligible
- (W) Walk-on
- Injured
- Current redshirt

Roster
Last update: November 9, 2026

== Schedule and results ==
Date time, TV	Rank^{#}	Opponent^{#}	Result	Record	Site (attendance) city, state
Exhibition
September 27, 2026*; 2:00 pm, ESPN+		vs. Charleston; TheLinkU Invitational	L 59–69		Credit One Stadium; Charleston, SC
Non-conference regular season
November 2, 2026*; 8:00 pm, ESPN+		at Loyola	L 52–77	0–1	Gentile Arena (1,959); Chicago, IL
November 6, 2026*; 7:00 pm, ESPN+		Erskine	W 100–57	1–1	McAlister Field House (1,011); Charleston, SC
November 10, 2026*; 7:00 pm, ESPN+		Virginia Lynchburg	W 131–50	2–1	McAlister Field House (944); Charleston, SC
November 14, 2026*; 2:00 pm, ESPN+		at North Florida	W 77–74	3–1	UNF Arena (2,485); Jacksonville, FL
November 16, 2026*; 7:00 pm, ESPN+		at Clemson	L 51–87	3–2	Littlejohn Coliseum (5,358); Clemson, SC
November 20, 2026*; 7:00 pm, ESPN+		South Carolina State	W 76–63	4–2	McAlister Field House (967); Charleston, SC
November 25, 2026*; 7:00 pm, ESPN+		USC Upstate			McAlister Field House; Charleston, SC
November 28, 2026*; 2:00 pm, ESPN+		at High Point			Qubein Center; High Point, NC
December 1, 2026*; 7:00 pm		at Charleston Southern			Buccaneer Field House; North Charleston, SC
December 5, 2026; 1:00 pm, ESPN+		at Western Carolina			Ramsey Center; Cullowhee, NC
December 9, 2026*; 7:00 pm, ACCN		at Georgia Tech			McCamish Pavilion; Atlanta, GA
December 16, 2026*; 7:00 pm, ESPN+		Toccoa Falls			McAlister Field House; Charleston, SC
December 19, 2026; 1:00 pm, ESPN+		Tennessee Tech			McAlister Field House; Charleston, SC
December 21, 2026*; 8:00 pm, The CW		at North Carolina			Dean Smith Center; Chapel Hill, NC
SoCon regular season
December 30, 2026; 7:00 pm, ESPN+		at UNC Greensboro			Bodford Arena; Greensboro, NC
January 2, 2027; 1:00 pm, ESPN+		Chattanooga			McAlister Field House; Charleston, SC
January 6, 2027; 7:00 pm, ESPN+		Wofford			McAlister Field House; Charleston, SC
January 9, 2027; 5:00 pm, ESPN+		at Samford			Pete Hanna Center; Birmingham, AL
January 13, 2027; 7:00 pm, ESPN+		Furman			McAlister Field House; Charleston, SC
January 16, 2027; 10:00 am, CBSSN		at VMI			Cameron Hall; Lexington, VA
January 18, 2027; 7:00 pm, ESPN+		East Tennessee State			McAlister Field House; Charleston, SC
January 21, 2027; 6:00 pm, ESPN+		at Wofford			Jerry Richardson Indoor Stadium; Spartanburg, SC
January 23, 2027; 1:00 pm, ESPN+		Samford			McAlister Field House; Charleston, SC
January 27, 2027; 6:30 pm, ESPN+		at Furman			Timmons Arena; Greenville, SC
January 30, 2027; 2:00 pm, ESPN+		at Mercer			Hawkins Arena; Macon, GA
February 3, 2027; 7:00 pm, ESPN+		UNC Greensboro			McAlister Field House; Charleston, SC
February 6, 2027; 5:00 pm, ESPN+		at Tennessee Tech			Eblen Center; Cookeville, TN
February 10, 2027; 7:00 pm, ESPN+		Western Carolina			McAlister Field House; Charleston, SC
February 13, 2027; 2:00 pm, ESPN+		at Chattanooga			McKenzie Arena; Chattanooga, TN
February 20, 2027; 1:00 pm, ESPN+		VMI			McAlister Field House; Charleston, SC
February 24, 2027; 7:00 pm, ESPN+		at East Tennessee State			Freedom Hall Civic Center; Johnson City, TN
February 27, 2027; 1:00 pm, ESPN+		Mercer			McAlister Field House; Charleston, SC
SoCon tournament
March 4–5, 2027		vs. TBD			Harrah's Cherokee Center; Asheville, NC
*Non-conference game. ^{#}Rankings from AP Poll. (#) Tournament seedings in parentheses. All times are in Eastern.
