= 2026–27 Wofford Terriers men's basketball team =

American college basketball season

2026–27 Wofford Terriers men's basketball
- Conference: Southern Conference
- Record: 1–2 (0–0 SoCon)
- Head coach: Kevin Giltner (2nd season)
- Assistant coaches: Drew Gibson; Jeremiah Samarrippas; Trent Patterson; Kevin McGeehan
- Home arena: Jerry Richardson Indoor Stadium

2026–27 Southern Conference men's basketball standings
| | Conf. | | | | Overall |
| Team | W | | L | PCT | W | | L | PCT |
|---|---|---|---|---|---|---|---|---|
| Furman | 0 | – | 0 | – | 3 | – | 0 | 1.000 |
| The Citadel | 0 | – | 0 | – | 2 | – | 1 | .667 |
| Tennessee Tech | 0 | – | 0 | – | 2 | – | 1 | .667 |
| Mercer | 0 | – | 0 | – | 2 | – | 2 | .500 |
| Samford | 0 | – | 0 | – | 1 | – | 1 | .500 |
| Western Carolina | 0 | – | 0 | – | 1 | – | 1 | .500 |
| Chattanooga | 0 | – | 0 | – | 1 | – | 2 | .333 |
| UNC Greensboro | 0 | – | 0 | – | 1 | – | 2 | .333 |
| VMI | 0 | – | 0 | – | 1 | – | 2 | .333 |
| Wofford | 0 | – | 0 | – | 1 | – | 2 | .333 |
| East Tennessee State | 0 | – | 0 | – | 0 | – | 2 | .000 |
† 2027 SoCon tournament winner As of November 11, 2026; Rankings from AP poll

The 2026–27 Wofford Terriers men's basketball team represents Wofford College during the 2026–27 NCAA Division I men's basketball season. The Terriers, led by second-year head coach Kevin Giltner, play their home games at Jerry Richardson Indoor Stadium in Spartanburg, South Carolina as members of the Southern Conference (SoCon).

== Previous season ==
The Terriers finished the 2025–26 season 19–13, 11–7 in SoCon play, to finish in a tie for second place. They were upset by #7 seed UNC Greensboro in the quarterfinals of the SoCon tournament.

== Preseason ==
On October 7, 2026, the SoCon released their preseason coaches poll. Wofford was picked to third in the conference.

=== Preseason rankings ===
SoCon Preseason Poll
| Place | Team | Points |
|---|---|---|
| 1 | Furman | 100 (10) |
| 2 | East Tennessee State | 86 (1) |
| 3 | Wofford | 78 |
| 4 | Samford | 70 |
| 5 | Chattanooga | 59 |
| 6 | Tennessee Tech | 57 |
| 7 | Mercer | 47 |
| 8 | Western Carolina | 41 |
| 9 | VMI | 32 |
| 10 | The Citadel | 21 |
| 11 | UNC Greensboro | 13 |
(#) first-place votes

=== Preseason All-SoCon Team ===
Preseason All-SoCon Team
| Player | Year | Position |
|---|---|---|
| Cam Lowe | Redshirt Junior | Guard |
| Chace Watley | Sophomore | Guard |

== Roster ==
2026–27 Wofford Terriers men's basketball team
Players
Coaches

| Pos. | # | Name | Height | Weight | Year | Previous school | Hometown |
|---|---|---|---|---|---|---|---|
| G | 0 | Cam Lowe | 6 ft 6 in (1.98 m) | 220 lb (100 kg) | RS Jr | Black Hills State | Colorado Springs, Colorado |
| F | 1 | Brian Sumpter | 6 ft 9 in (2.06 m) | 200 lb (91 kg) | So | Keenan High School | Columbia, South Carolina |
| G | 2 | Luke Flynn | 6 ft 1 in (1.85 m) | 185 lb (84 kg) | Jr | Walton High School | Marietta, Georgia |
| G | 3 | Chris Arias | 6 ft 6 in (1.98 m) | 208 lb (94 kg) | Jr | Jacksonville | Jacksonville, Florida |
| G | 4 | Chace Watley | 6 ft 2 in (1.88 m) | 190 lb (86 kg) | So | Totino-Grace High School | Minneapolis, Minnesota |
| G | 5 | Jemon Price | 6 ft 2 in (1.88 m) | 180 lb (82 kg) | Fr | Westfield High School | Chantilly, Virginia |
| F | 7 | Cannon Richards | 6 ft 7 in (2.01 m) | 210 lb (95 kg) | Jr | Kell High School | Atlanta, Georgia |
| G | 10 | Jacob Daniels | 6 ft 0 in (1.83 m) | 175 lb (79 kg) | So | Lander | St. Petersburg, Florida |
| G | 11 | Jyi Dawkins | 6 ft 4 in (1.93 m) | 212 lb (96 kg) | Fr | Ben L. Smith High School | Greensboro, North Carolina |
| G | 12 | Grayson Collins | 5 ft 11 in (1.8 m) | 170 lb (77 kg) | Jr | Battle Ground Academy | Nashville, Tennessee |
| G | 15 | Jhett Carter | 6 ft 5 in (1.96 m) | 206 lb (93 kg) | Fr | Hargrave Military Academy | Titusville, Florida |
| G | 23 | Misho Kalinov | 6 ft 1 in (1.85 m) | 186 lb (84 kg) | Fr | BC Botev Academic | Silistra, Bulgaria |
| C | 33 | Evan Ramsey | 7 ft 0 in (2.13 m) | 265 lb (120 kg) | RS Jr | UVA Wise | Abingdon, Virginia |
| F | 34 | Cutter Sisk | 6 ft 9 in (2.06 m) | 265 lb (120 kg) | Fr | Beech Senior High School | Hendersonville, Tennessee |
| G | 92 | Davis Miller | 6 ft 3 in (1.91 m) | 194 lb (88 kg) | Sr | Sayre School | Lexington, Kentucky |

Head coach

- Kevin Giltner (Wofford)

Assistant coach(es)

- Drew Gibson (Wofford)
- Jeremiah Samarrippas (Tennessee Tech)
- Trent Patterson (Troy)
- Kevin McGeehan (Gettysburg)

Legend

- (C) Team captain
- (S) Suspended
- (I) Ineligible
- (W) Walk-on
- Injured
- Current redshirt

Roster
Last update: November 2, 2026

== Schedule and results ==
| Date time, TV | Rank^{#} | Opponent^{#} | Result | Record | High points | High rebounds | High assists | Site (attendance) city, state |
Non-conference regular season
| November 3, 2026*; 6:00 pm, SECN | | at No. 8 Tennessee | L 59–90 | 0–1 | 14 – Lowe | 10 – Ramsey | 2 – Tied | Thompson-Boling Arena (18,389); Knoxville, TN |
| November 6, 2026*; 7:00 pm, ACCN | | at North Carolina | L 70–109 | 1–1 | 27 – Sisk | 7 – Sisk | 3 – Tied | Dean Smith Center (17,032); Chapel Hill, NC |
| November 8, 2026*; 2:00 pm, ESPN+ | | Allen (SC) | W 100–67 | 1–2 | 23 – Dawkins | 9 – Dawkins | 5 – Arias | Jerry Richardson Indoor Stadium (713); Spartanburg, SC |
| November 11, 2026*; 6:00 pm, ESPN+ | | Voorhees (SC) | | | | | | Jerry Richardson Indoor Stadium; Spartanburg, SC |
| November 14, 2026*; 2:00 pm, ESPN+ | | at Queens | | | | | | Curry Arena; Charlotte, NC |
| November 18, 2026*; 7:00 pm | | at Charleston Southern | | | | | | Buccaneer Field House; Charleston, SC |
| November 21, 2026*; 5:00 pm, ESPN+ | | Winthrop | | | | | | Jerry Richardson Indoor Stadium; Spartanburg, SC |
| November 24, 2026*; 6:00 pm, ESPN+ | | Queens | | | | | | Jerry Richardson Indoor Stadium; Spartanburg, SC |
| November 28, 2026*; 1:00 pm | | at Purdue Fort Wayne | | | | | | Hilliard Gates Sports Center; Fort Wayne, IN |
| December 1, 2026*; 7:00 pm | | at La Salle | | | | | | John Glaser Arena; Philadelphia, PA |
| December 5, 2026; 2:00 pm | | at Mercer | | | | | | Hawkins Arena; Macon, GA |
| December 9, 2026*; 6:00 pm, ESPN+ | | Georgia Southern | | | | | | Jerry Richardson Indoor Stadium; Spartanburg, SC |
| December 12, 2026*; 6:00 pm, ESPN+ | | Virginia University of Lynchburg | | | | | | Jerry Richardson Indoor Stadium; Spartanburg, SC |
SoCon regular season
| December 19, 2026; 5:00 pm, ESPN+ | | at Samford | | | | | | Pete Hanna Center; Birmingham, AL |
| December 22, 2026; 6:00 pm, ESPN+ | | Western Carolina | | | | | | Jerry Richardson Indoor Stadium; Spartanburg, SC |
| December 30, 2026; 6:00 pm, ESPN+ | | Tennessee Tech | | | | | | Jerry Richardson Indoor Stadium; Spartanburg, SC |
| January 2, 2027; 2:00 pm, ESPN+ | | at UNC Greensboro | | | | | | Bodford Arena; Greensboro, NC |
| January 6, 2027; 7:00 pm, ESPN+ | | at The Citadel | | | | | | McAlister Field House; Charleston, SC |
| January 9, 2027; 2:00 pm, ESPN+ | | Mercer | | | | | | Jerry Richardson Indoor Stadium; Spartanburg, SC |
| January 13, 2027; 6:00 pm, ESPN+ | | at VMI | | | | | | Cameron Hall; Lexington, VA |
| January 16, 2027; 5:00 pm, ESPN+ | | Chattanooga | | | | | | Jerry Richardson Indoor Stadium; Spartanburg, SC |
| January 19, 2027; 6:00 pm, CBSSN | | at Furman | | | | | | Timmons Arena; Greenville, SC |
| January 21, 2027; 6:00 pm, ESPN+ | | The Citadel | | | | | | Jerry Richardson Indoor Stadium; Spartanburg, SC |
| January 24, 2027; 5:00 pm, ESPN2 | | East Tennessee State | | | | | | Jerry Richardson Indoor Stadium; Spartanburg, SC |
| January 27, 2027; 6:00 pm, ESPN+ | | at Western Carolina | | | | | | Ramsey Center; Cullowhee, NC |
| January 30, 2027; 2:00 pm, ESPN+/CW 62 | | Samford | | | | | | Jerry Richardson Indoor Stadium; Spartanburg, SC |
| February 3, 2027; 6:00 pm, ESPN+ | | VMI | | | | | | Jerry Richardson Indoor Stadium; Spartanburg, SC |
| February 7, 2027; 6:00 pm, ESPN2 | | at Chattanooga | | | | | | McKenzie Arena; Chattanooga, TN |
| February 14, 2027; 2:00 pm, CBSSN | | at East Tennessee State | | | | | | Freedom Hall Civic Center; Johnson City, TN |
| February 18, 2027; 6:00 pm, ESPN+ | | UNC Greensboro | | | | | | Jerry Richardson Indoor Stadium; Spartanburg, SC |
| February 20, 2027; 4:00 pm, CBSSN | | Furman | | | | | | Jerry Richardson Indoor Stadium; Spartanburg, SC |
| February 24, 2027; 7:30 pm, ESPN+ | | at Tennessee Tech | | | | | | Hooper Eblen Center; Cookeville, TN |
SoCon tournament
| March 4–5, 2027 | | vs. TBD | | | | | | Harrah's Cherokee Center; Asheville, NC |
*Non-conference game. ^{#}Rankings from AP Poll. (#) Tournament seedings in parentheses. All times are in Eastern.
