= 2026–27 Mercer Bears men's basketball team =

American college basketball season

2026–27 Mercer Bears men's basketball
- Conference: Southern Conference
- Record: 1–2 (– SoCon)
- Head coach: Ryan Ridder (3rd season)
- Associate head coach: Woody Taylor
- Assistant coaches: Tysor Anderson; Langston Hall; Nashad Mackey
- Home arena: Hawkins Arena

2026–27 Southern Conference men's basketball standings
	Conf.				Overall
Team	W		L	PCT	W		L	PCT
Furman	0	–	0	–	3	–	0	1.000
The Citadel	0	–	0	–	1	–	1	.500
Samford	0	–	0	–	1	–	1	.500
Tennessee Tech	0	–	0	–	2	–	1	.667
UNC Greensboro	0	–	0	–	1	–	1	.500
Western Carolina	0	–	0	–	1	–	1	.500
Mercer	0	–	0	–	1	–	2	.333
VMI	0	–	0	–	1	–	2	.333
Chattanooga	0	–	0	–	0	–	2	.000
East Tennessee State	0	–	0	–	0	–	2	.000
Wofford	0	–	0	–	0	–	2	.000
† 2027 SoCon tournament winner As of November 9, 2026; Rankings from AP poll

The 2026–27 Mercer Bears men's basketball team represent Mercer University during the 2026–27 NCAA Division I men's basketball season. The Bears, led by third-year head coach Ryan Ridder, play their home games at Hawkins Arena in Macon, Georgia as members of the Southern Conference (SoCon).

== Previous season ==
The Bears finished the 2025–26 season 19–13, 11–7 in SoCon play, to finish in a three-way tie for second place. They were defeated by Western Carolina in the quarterfinals of the SoCon tournament.

== Preseason ==
On October 7, 2026, the SoCon released their preseason coaches poll. Mercer was picked to finish seventh in the conference.

=== Preseason rankings ===
SoCon Preseason Poll
Place	Team	Points
1	Furman	100 (10)
2	East Tennessee State	86 (1)
3	Wofford	78
4	Samford	70
5	Chattanooga	59
6	Tennessee Tech	57
7	Mercer	47
8	Western Carolina	41
9	VMI	32
10	The Citadel	21
11	UNC Greensboro	13
(#) first-place votes

=== Preseason All-SoCon Team ===
Preseason All-SoCon Team
Player	Year	Position
Brady Shoulders	Junior	Guard/Forward

== Roster ==
2026–27 Mercer Bears men's basketball team
Players
Coaches

Pos.	#	Name	Height	Weight	Year	Previous school	Hometown
G	0	Dawson Barr	6 ft 4 in (1.93 m)	190 lb (86 kg)	RS Jr	Embry–Riddle	Orlando, Florida
G	1	KJ LaMonte	6 ft 3 in (1.91 m)	175 lb (79 kg)	Jr	Indian Hills CC	Davenport, Iowa
G	2	Shane Cherry	5 ft 11 in (1.8 m)	165 lb (75 kg)	So	Tallahassee State	Knoxville, Tennessee
G	3	Quinton Perkins II	6 ft 2 in (1.88 m)	185 lb (84 kg)	RS Jr	Indian Hills CC	Dallas, Texas
G	5	Ryder Cate	6 ft 5 in (1.96 m)	190 lb (86 kg)	Jr	Clarendon	Richmond, Indiana
F	9	Dimitrije Kovacevic	6 ft 8 in (2.03 m)	215 lb (98 kg)	So	Wake Forest	Doboj, Bosnia and Herzegovina
G	10	Manos Koveos	5 ft 10 in (1.78 m)	160 lb (73 kg)	Sr	Georgia State	Rhodes, Greece
G	11	Brady Shoulders	6 ft 6 in (1.98 m)	210 lb (95 kg)	Jr	Lyon County High School	Eddyville, Kentucky
F	12	Petras Padegimas	6 ft 8 in (2.03 m)	230 lb (104 kg)	RS Jr	Dayton	Kaunas, Lithuania
G	16	Harrison Lyttle	5 ft 10 in (1.78 m)	165 lb (75 kg)	Fr	IMG Academy	Sydney, Australia
F	18	Karon Boyd	6 ft 6 in (1.98 m)	225 lb (102 kg)	Sr	Wichita State	Concord, North Carolina
F	22	Sawyer Mayhugh	6 ft 9 in (2.06 m)	225 lb (102 kg)	Jr	Indian Hills CC	Weston, Massachusetts
G	23	Derek Goodman	6 ft 4 in (1.93 m)	190 lb (86 kg)	Jr	Ohio Dominican	Delaware, Ohio
F	25	Keelan Steele	6 ft 10 in (2.08 m)	230 lb (104 kg)	RS Sr	Maine	Alton, Ontario
G	30	Josh Jackson	6 ft 0 in (1.83 m)	160 lb (73 kg)	Fr	Houston County High School	Warner Robins, Georgia
F	35	Makoi Mabor Makoi	6 ft 11 in (2.11 m)	245 lb (111 kg)	Jr	UNC Wilmington	Rubek, South Sudan

Head coach

- Ryan Ridder (Embry–Riddle)

Assistant coach(es)

- Woody Taylor (Eckerd)
- Tysor Anderson (Georgia Tech)
- Langston Hall (Mercer)
- Nashad Mackey (Embry–Riddle)

Legend

- (C) Team captain
- (S) Suspended
- (I) Ineligible
- (W) Walk-on
- Injured
- Current redshirt

Roster
Last update: November 5, 2026

== Schedule and results ==
Date time, TV	Rank^{#}	Opponent^{#}	Result	Record	Site (attendance) city, state
Non-conference regular season
November 2, 2026*; 11:00 am, ESPN+		Reinhardt	W 90–53	1–0	Hawkins Arena (923); Macon, GA
November 5, 2026*; 7:00 pm, ACCNX		at Virginia Tech	L 67–96	1–1	Cassell Coliseum (5,060); Blacksburg, VA
November 7, 2026*; 7:00 pm, ESPN+		at Davidson	L 76–88	1–2	John M. Belk Arena (2,466); Davidson, NC
November 10, 2026*; 7:00 pm		at Georgia Southern			Hill Convocation Center; Statesboro, GA
November 12, 2026*; 7:00 pm		at West Virginia			Hope Coliseum; Morgantown, WV
November 18, 2026*; 7:00 pm		at Presbyterian			Templeton Center; Clinton, SC
November 21, 2026*; 7:00 pm, ESPN+		Charleston Southern			Hawkins Arena; Macon, GA
November 24, 2026*; 6:00 pm		at Florida Atlantic			Eleanor R. Baldwin Arena; Boca Raton, FL
November 29, 2026*; 2:00 pm, ESPN+		Georgia Southern–East Georgia			Hawkins Arena; Macon, GA
December 5, 2026; 2:00 pm, ESPN+		Wofford			Hawkins Arena; Macon, GA
December 8, 2026*; 10:00 pm, ESPN+		at Arizona State			Desert Financial Arena; Tempe, AZ
December 15, 2026*; 9:00 pm, MW+		at New Mexico			The Pit; Albuquerque, NM
SoCon regular season
December 19, 2026; 2:00 pm, ESPN+		at Chattanooga			McKenzie Arena; Chattanooga, TN
December 22, 2026; 7:30 pm, ESPN+		at Tennessee Tech			Eblen Center; Cookeville, TN
December 30, 2026; 6:00 pm, ESPN+		East Tennessee State			Hawkins Arena; Macon, GA
January 6, 2027; 6:00 pm, ESPN+		Western Carolina			Hawkins Arena; Macon, GA
January 9, 2027; 2:00 pm, ESPN+		at Wofford			Jerry Richardson Indoor Stadium; Spartanburg, SC
January 11, 2027; 7:00 pm, ESPN+		Samford			Hawkins Arena; Macon, GA
January 16, 2027; 7:00 pm, ESPN+		at Furman			Timmons Arena; Greenville, SC
January 18, 2027; 6:00 pm, ESPN+		at Western Carolina			Ramsey Center; Cullowhee, NC
January 20, 2027; 6:00 pm, ESPN+		VMI			Hawkins Arena; Macon, GA
January 23, 2027; 2:00 pm, ESPN+		UNC Greensboro			Hawkins Arena; Macon, GA
January 27, 2027; 7:00 pm, ESPN+		at East Tennessee State			Freedom Hall Civic Center; Johnson City, TN
January 30, 2027; 2:00 pm, ESPN+		The Citadel			Hawkins Arena; Macon, GA
February 6, 2027; 4:30 pm, ESPN+		Furman			Hawkins Arena; Macon, GA
February 11, 2027; 6:00 pm, ESPN+		at VMI			Hawkins Arena; Macon, GA
February 13, 2027; 12:00 pm, ESPN+		at UNC Greensboro			Bodford Arena; Greensboro, NC
February 18, 2027; 6:00 pm, ESPN+		Tennessee Tech			Hawkins Arena; Macon, GA
February 20, 2027; 2:00 pm, ESPN+		Chattanooga			Hawkins Arena; Macon, GA
February 24, 2027; 7:30 pm, ESPN+		at Samford			Pete Hanna Center; Birmingham, AL
February 27, 2027; 1:00 pm, ESPN+		at The Citadel			McAlister Field House; Charleston, SC
SoCon tournament
March 4–5, 2027		vs. TBD			Harrah's Cherokee Center; Asheville, NC
*Non-conference game. ^{#}Rankings from AP Poll. (#) Tournament seedings in parentheses. All times are in Eastern.
