= 2026–27 High Point Panthers men's basketball team =

American college basketball season

2026–27 High Point Panthers men's basketball
- Conference: Big South Conference
- Record: 5–0 (0–0 Big South)
- Head coach: Flynn Clayman (2nd season)
- Assistant coaches: Ben Fletcher; Antoine Young; Anderson Clarke; Martynas Rubikas; Jorge Ruiz
- Home arena: Qubein Center

2026–27 Big South men's basketball standings
	Conf.				Overall
Team	W		L	PCT	W		L	PCT
High Point	0	–	0	–	5	–	0	1.000
Longwood	0	–	0	–	3	–	2	.600
Charleston Southern	0	–	0	–	2	–	2	.500
UNC Asheville	0	–	0	–	2	–	3	.400
Gardner–Webb	0	–	0	–	1	–	3	.250
Radford	0	–	0	–	1	–	3	.250
USC Upstate	0	–	0	–	1	–	4	.200
Presbyterian	0	–	0	–	0	–	3	.000
Winthrop	0	–	0	–	0	–	4	.000
† 2027 Big South tournament winner As of November 17, 2026; Rankings from AP poll

The 2026–27 High Point Panthers men's basketball team represents High Point University during the 2026–27 NCAA Division I men's basketball season. The Panthers, led by second-year head coach Flynn Clayman, play their home games at the Qubein Center in High Point, North Carolina as members of the Big South Conference.

== Previous season ==
The Panthers finished the 2025–26 season 31–5, 15–1 in Big South play, to finish as Big South regular season champions. They defeated Gardner–Webb, UNC Asheville, and Winthrop to win the Big South tournament championship, earning their second ever, and second consecutive, trip to the NCAA tournament. In the NCAA tournament, the Panthers would receive the #12 seed in the West Region, where they would win in the First Round against #5 region seed Wisconsin,and then would lose in the Second Round to the #4 region seed Arkansas.

== Preseason ==
On October 14, 2026, the Big South Conference released their preseason coaches poll. High Point was picked to finish atop the conference, while receiving seven first-place votes.

=== Preseason rankings ===
Big South Preseason Poll
Place	Team	Points
1	High Point	79 (7)
2	Presbyterian	69 (2)
3	Winthrop	57
4	Longwood	54
5	UNC Asheville	43
6	Radford	34
7	Charleston Southern	33
8	USC Upstate	21
9	Gardner–Webb	15
(#) first-place votes

=== Preseason All-Big South Teams ===
Preseason All-Big South First Team
Player	Year	Position
Cam'Ron Fletcher	Graduate	Forward
Jason Rivera Torres	Senior	Guard
CJ Brown	Junior	Guard

Preseason All-Big South Second Team
Player	Year	Position
Isaac Garrett	Senior	Forward

== Roster ==
2025–26 High Point Panthers men's basketball team
Players
Coaches

Pos.	#	Name	Height	Weight	Year	Previous school	Hometown
G	00	Curtis Williams Jr.	6 ft 6 in (1.98 m)	180 lb (82 kg)	Sr	Tulane	Detroit, Michigan
G	1	Jason Rivera Torres	6 ft 7 in (2.01 m)	195 lb (88 kg)	Sr	Monmouth	The Bronx, New York
F	2	Frankquon Sherman	6 ft 7 in (2.01 m)	220 lb (100 kg)	Sr	Kennesaw State	Lincolnton, Georgia
G	4	CJ Brown	6 ft 2 in (1.88 m)	175 lb (79 kg)	Jr	South Florida	Marietta, Georgia
G	5	Trey Pearson	6 ft 2 in (1.88 m)	170 lb (77 kg)	Fr	Pope John Paul II	Hendersonville, Tennessee
F	7	Caden Miller	6 ft 9 in (2.06 m)	220 lb (100 kg)	So	Covington Catholic High School	Cincinnati, Ohio
F	8	Jared Grey	6 ft 7 in (2.01 m)	180 lb (82 kg)	Fr	Hamburg Towers	Hamburg, Germany
G	9	Conrad Martinez	6 ft 0 in (1.83 m)	175 lb (79 kg)	Sr	Arizona	Granollers, Spain
F	11	Cam'Ron Fletcher	6 ft 7 in (2.01 m)	220 lb (100 kg)	GS	Xavier	St. Louis, Missouri
G	13	Mavrick Miller	6 ft 4 in (1.93 m)	180 lb (82 kg)	Jr	Houston High School	Memphis, Tennessee
F	15	Braden Hausen	6 ft 7 in (2.01 m)	213 lb (97 kg)	Jr	Amarillo High School	Amarillo, Texas
G	23	Kasen Krueger	6 ft 1 in (1.85 m)	185 lb (84 kg)	So	Amador Valley High School	Alamo, California
G	25	Alexandros Alexakis	6 ft 5 in (1.96 m)	215 lb (98 kg)	Fr	SoCal Academy	Greece
G	30	Filip Brankovic	6 ft 8 in (2.03 m)	265 lb (120 kg)	So	UTRGV	Indjija, Serbia
G	31	Seamus McDermott	6 ft 2 in (1.88 m)	178 lb (81 kg)	GS	Duquesne	Holland, Pennsylvania
F	32	Isaac Garrett	6 ft 8 in (2.03 m)	230 lb (104 kg)	Sr	Oakland	Pleasant Grove, Utah
G	33	Liam Campbell	6 ft 4 in (1.93 m)	205 lb (93 kg)	Jr	Saint Mary's	Meridian, Idaho

Head coach

- Flynn Clayman (Troy)

Assistant coach(es)

- Ben Fletcher (Troy)
- Antoine Young (Creighton)
- Anderson Clarke (Concordia–Irvine)
- Martynas Rubikas (Cincinnati)
- Jorge Ruiz (Grand Canyon)

Legend

- (C) Team captain
- (S) Suspended
- (I) Ineligible
- (W) Walk-on
- Injured
- Current redshirt

Roster
Last update: October 18, 2026

== Schedule and results ==
Date time, TV	Rank^{#}	Opponent^{#}	Result	Record	Site (attendance) city, state
Exhibition
October 17, 2026*; 1:00 pm		UNC Wilmington	W 92–71		Qubein Center; High Point, NC
October 25, 2026*; 4:00 pm		at East Tennessee State	W 84–71		Freedom Hall Civic Center (861); Johnson City, TN
Non-conference regular season
November 2, 2026*; 12:00 a.m., YouTube		vs. Liberty; Field of 68 Opening Day Marathon	W 72–57	1–0	Rock Hill Sports & Events Center; Rock Hill, SC
November 4, 2026*; 7:00 pm, ESPN+		Maryland Eastern Shore	W 63–49	2–0	Qubein Center (3,462); High Point, NC
November 7, 2026*; 5:00 pm, ESPN+		Washington State	W 83–71	3–0	Qubein Center (4,734); High Point, NC
November 12, 2026*; 7:00 pm, ESPN+		Southern Utah	W 88–59	4–0	Qubein Center (3,494); High Point, NC
November 15, 2026*; 3:00 pm, ESPN2		at Saint Louis	W 68–58	5–0	Chaifetz Arena (6,566); St. Louis, MO
November 19, 2026*; 7:00 pm, ESPN+		Montana State			Qubein Center; High Point, NC
November 24, 2026*; 8:15 p.m., FloSports		vs. Duquesne; Sunshine Slam			Ocean Center; Daytona Beach, FL
November 28, 2026*; 2:00 pm, ESPN+		The Citadel			Qubein Center; High Point, NC
December 2, 2026*; 7:00 pm, ESPN+		George Mason			Qubein Center; High Point, NC
December 4, 2026*; 7:00 pm, ESPN+		Wagner			Qubein Center; High Point, NC
December 6, 2026*; 2:00 pm, ESPN+		William Peace			Qubein Center; High Point, NC
December 12, 2026*; 1:00 pm		vs. Miami (OH)			Novant Health Fieldhouse; Greensboro, NC
December 15, 2026*; 7:00 pm, ESPN+		North Carolina Central			Qubein Center; High Point, NC
December 18, 2026*; 8:00 pm, SECN+		at LSU			Pete Maravich Assembly Center; Baton Rouge, LA
December 21, 2026*; 7:00 p.m., ESPN+		Loyola (MD)			Qubein Center; High Point, NC
December 28, 2026*; 7:00 p.m., ESPN+		Pfeiffer			Qubein Center; High Point, NC
Big South regular season
January 3, 2027; 2:00 pm, ESPN+		USC Upstate			Qubein Center; High Point, NC
January 6, 2027; TBA, ESPN+		at Presbyterian			Templeton Physical Education Center; Clinton, SC
January 9, 2026; TBA, ESPN+		at Radford			Dedmon Center; Radford, VA
January 13, 2027; 7:00 pm, ESPN+		Gardner–Webb			Qubein Center; High Point, NC
January 16, 2027; TBA, ESPN+		at Charleston Southern			Buccaneer Field House; North Charleston, SC
January 20, 2027; TBA, ESPN+		at Winthrop			Winthrop Coliseum; Rock Hill, SC
January 23, 2027; 7:00 pm, ESPN+		Longwood			Qubein Center; High Point, NC
January 28, 2027; 7:00 pm, ESPN+		UNC Asheville			Qubein Center; High Point, NC
January 30, 2027; TBA, ESPN+		at USC Upstate			G. B. Hodge Center; Spartanburg, SC
February 6, 2027; 7:00 pm, ESPN+		Charleston Southern			Qubein Center; High Point, NC
February 11, 2027; TBA, ESPN+		at UNC Asheville			Kimmel Arena; Asheville, NC
February 13, 2027; TBA, ESPN+		at Gardner–Webb			Paul Porter Arena; Boiling Springs, NC
February 18, 2027; 7:00 pm, ESPN+		Winthrop			Qubein Center; High Point, NC
February 20, 2027; 2:00 pm, ESPN+		Presbyterian			Qubein Center; High Point, NC
February 25, 2027; TBA, ESPN+		at Longwood			Joan Perry Brock Center; Farmville, VA
February 27, 2027; 7:00 pm, ESPN+		Radford			Qubein Center; High Point, NC
Big South tournament
March 3-7, 2027; TBA		vs.			Freedom Hall Civic Center; Johnson City, TN
*Non-conference game. ^{#}Rankings from AP Poll. (#) Tournament seedings in parentheses. All times are in Eastern.

== Rankings ==
Ranking movements Legend: ██ Increase in ranking ██ Decrease in ranking — = Not ranked RV = Received votes
	Week																				
Poll	Pre	1	2	3	4	5	6	7	8	9	10	11	12	13	14	15	16	17	18	19	Final
AP	—	RV	RV																		
Coaches	—	—	RV																		
