= 2026–27 East Tennessee State Buccaneers men's basketball team =

American college basketball season

2026–27 East Tennessee State Buccaneers men's basketball
- Conference: Southern Conference
- Record: 0–2 (0–0 SoCon)
- Head coach: Brooks Savage (4th season)
- Associate head coach: Dwight Perry
- Assistant coaches: Kris Arkenberg; Miles Lester
- Home arena: Freedom Hall Civic Center

2026–27 Southern Conference men's basketball standings
	Conf.				Overall
Team	W		L	PCT	W		L	PCT
Furman	0	–	0	–	4	–	1	.800
The Citadel	0	–	0	–	3	–	1	.750
VMI	0	–	0	–	3	–	2	.600
Chattanooga	0	–	0	–	2	–	2	.500
Tennessee Tech	0	–	0	–	2	–	2	.500
UNC Greensboro	0	–	0	–	2	–	2	.500
Western Carolina	0	–	0	–	2	–	2	.500
Wofford	0	–	0	–	2	–	3	.400
Mercer	0	–	0	–	2	–	3	.400
East Tennessee State	0	–	0	–	1	–	2	.333
Samford	0	–	0	–	1	–	2	.333
† 2027 SoCon tournament winner As of November 15, 2026; Rankings from AP poll

The 2026–27 East Tennessee State Buccaneers men's basketball team represent East Tennessee State University during the 2026–27 NCAA Division I men's basketball season. The Buccaneers, led by fourth-year head coach Brooks Savage, play their home games at the Freedom Hall Civic Center in Johnson City, Tennessee, as members of the Southern Conference.

== Previous season ==
The Buccaneers finished the 2025–26 season 23–11, 13–5 in SoCon play, to finish as SoCon regular season champions. They defeated The Citadel and Western Carolina, before falling to Furman in the SoCon tournament championship game.

== Preseason ==
On October 7, 2026, the SoCon released their preseason coaches poll. East Tennessee State was picked to finish second in the conference.

=== Preseason rankings ===
SoCon Preseason Poll
Place	Team	Points
1	Furman	100 (10)
2	East Tennessee State	86 (1)
3	Wofford	78
4	Samford	70
5	Chattanooga	59
6	Tennessee Tech	57
7	Mercer	47
8	Western Carolina	41
9	VMI	32
10	The Citadel	21
11	UNC Greensboro	13
(#) first-place votes

=== Preseason All-SoCon Team ===
Preseason All-SoCon Team
Player	Year	Position
BJ Ward	Senior	Guard

== Roster ==
2026–27 East Tennessee State Buccaneers men's basketball team
Players
Coaches

Pos.	#	Name	Height	Weight	Year	Previous school	Hometown
G	0	BJ Ward	6 ft 0 in (1.83 m)	185 lb (84 kg)	Sr	Southeast Missouri State	St. Louis, Missouri
G	1	Jayden Cooper	6 ft 0 in (1.83 m)	195 lb (88 kg)	Sr	South Alabama	Pike Road, Alabama
G	2	Maki Johnson	6 ft 5 in (1.96 m)	195 lb (88 kg)	Sr	Huntington Prep	Huntington, West Virginia
G	3	Maddox Huff	6 ft 2 in (1.88 m)	190 lb (86 kg)	RS Fr	Harlan County High School	Baxter, Kentucky
G	4	Colt Busse	6 ft 4 in (1.93 m)	170 lb (77 kg)	Fr	Archbishop Spalding High School	Baltimore, Maryland
G	6	Trevor Hennig	6 ft 4 in (1.93 m)	185 lb (84 kg)	Jr	Weber State	North Bend, Washington
G	7	Tyran Mason	6 ft 6 in (1.98 m)	205 lb (93 kg)	Jr	UT Arlington	Plano, Texas
F	8	Kendall Campbell	6 ft 7 in (2.01 m)	220 lb (100 kg)	Sr	Wingate	Atlanta, Georgia
G	9	DeCarl Payne	6 ft 2 in (1.88 m)	195 lb (88 kg)	Jr	John A. Logan	Carbondale, Illinois
G	10	Ben Maller	6 ft 4 in (1.93 m)	205 lb (93 kg)	Fr	Prolific Prep	Mountain View, California
F	11	Marqus Marion	6 ft 9 in (2.06 m)	225 lb (102 kg)	RS Jr	Wake Forest	Skovlunde, Denmark
F	14	Brayden Crump	6 ft 9 in (2.06 m)	225 lb (102 kg)	RS Jr	Elon	Morganton, North Carolina
F	15	Elton Smith	6 ft 8 in (2.03 m)	225 lb (102 kg)	Fr	Dynamic Prep	Columbia, South Carolina
F	35	Jordan McCullum	6 ft 8 in (2.03 m)	220 lb (100 kg)	Jr	Murray State	Harriman, Tennessee

Head coach

- Brooks Savage (Tennessee)

Assistant coach(es)

- Dwight Perry (Kentucky)
- Kris Arkenberg (IUPUI)
- Miles Lester (Wake Forest)

Legend

- (C) Team captain
- (S) Suspended
- (I) Ineligible
- (W) Walk-on
- Injured
- Current redshirt

Roster
Last update: October 28, 2026

== Schedule and results ==
Date time, TV	Rank^{#}	Opponent^{#}	Result	Record	Site (attendance) city, state
Exhibition
October 25, 2026*; 4:00 pm		High Point; Charity Exhibition	L 71–84		Freedom Hall Civic Center; Johnson City, TN
Non-conference regular season
November 2, 2026*; 10:00 pm, ESPN+		at Arizona State	L 65–75	0–1	Desert Financial Arena (5,353); Tempe, AZ
November 6, 2026*; 7:00 pm, ACCNX		at NC State	L 63–77	0–2	Lenovo Center (15,413); Raleigh, NC
November 11, 2026*; 7:00 pm, ESPN+		Campbell	W 68–53	1–2	Freedom Hall Civic Center (2,541); Johnson City, TN
November 17, 2026*; 7:00 pm, ESPN+		at Marshall			Cam Henderson Center; Huntington, WV
November 21, 2026*; 4:00 pm, ESPN+		Longwood			Freedom Hall Civic Center; Johnson City, TN
November 23, 2026*; 7:00 pm, ESPN+		Kentucky State			Freedom Hall Civic Center; Johnson City, TN
November 27, 2026*; 7:00 pm, ESPN+		Charleston Southern; ETSU MTE			Freedom Hall Civic Center; Johnson City, TN
November 29, 2026*; 4:00 pm, ESPN+		Morehead State; ETSU MTE			Freedom Hall Civic Center; Johnson City, TN
December 1, 2026*; 7:00 pm, ESPN+		Virginia Lynchburg			Freedom Hall Civic Center; Johnson City, TN
December 5, 2026; 1:00 pm, ESPN+		at VMI			Cameron Hall; Lexington, VA
December 8, 2026*; 7:00 pm, ESPN+		Presbyterian			Freedom Hall Civic Center; Johnson City, TN
December 12, 2026*; 5:00 pm		at Jacksonville State			Pete Mathews Coliseum; Jacksonville, AL
December 15, 2026*; 7:00 pm, ESPN+		Northern Kentucky			Freedom Hall Civic Center; Johnson City, TN
SoCon regular season
December 19, 2026; 4:00 pm, ESPN+		UNC Greensboro			Freedom Hall Civic Center; Johnson City, TN
December 22, 2026; 7:00 pm, ESPN+		Furman			Freedom Hall Civic Center; Johnson City, TN
December 30, 2026; 6:00 pm, ESPN+		at Mercer			Hawkins Arena; Macon, GA
January 2, 2027; 5:00 pm, ESPN+		at Samford			Pete Hanna Center; Birmingham, AL
January 9, 2027; 4:00 pm, ESPN+		Western Carolina			Freedom Hall Civic Center; Johnson City, TN
January 13, 2027; 7:00 pm, ESPN+		Tennessee Tech			Freedom Hall Civic Center; Johnson City, TN
January 16, 2027; 2:00 pm, ESPN+		at UNC Greensboro			Bodford Arena; Greensboro, NC
January 18, 2027; 2:00 pm, ESPN+		at The Citadel			McAlister Field House; Charleston, SC
January 21, 2027; 7:00 pm, ESPN+		Chattanooga			Freedom Hall Civic Center; Johnson City, TN
January 24, 2027; 4:00 pm, ESPNU/ESPN2		at Wofford			Jerry Richardson Indoor Stadium; Spartanburg, SC
January 27, 2027; 7:00 pm, ESPN+		Mercer			Freedom Hall Civic Center; Johnson City, TN
January 31, 2027; 12:00 pm, ESPN2		at Furman			Timmons Arena; Greenville, SC
February 3, 2027; 7:00 pm, ESPN+		at Chattanooga			McKenzie Arena; Chattanooga, TN
February 6, 2027; 4:00 pm, ESPN+		VMI			Freedom Hall Civic Center; Johnson City, TN
February 10, 2027; 7:30 pm, ESPN+		at Tennessee Tech			Hooper Eblen Center; Cookeville, TN
February 14, 2027; 2:00 pm, CBSSN		Wofford			Freedom Hall Civic Center; Johnson City, TN
February 18, 2027; 6:00 pm, ESPN+		at Western Carolina			Ramsey Center; Cullowhee, NC
February 24, 2027; 7:00 pm, ESPN+		The Citadel			Freedom Hall Civic Center; Johnson City, TN
February 27, 2027; 10:00 am, CBSSN		Samford			Freedom Hall Civic Center; Johnson City, TN
SoCon tournament
March 4–5, 2027		vs. TBD			Harrah's Cherokee Center; Asheville, NC
*Non-conference game. ^{#}Rankings from AP Poll. (#) Tournament seedings in parentheses. All times are in Eastern.
