= 2026–27 Delaware State Hornets men's basketball team =

American college basketball season

2026–27 Delaware State Hornets men's basketball
- Conference: Mid-Eastern Athletic Conference
- Record: 2–4 (0–0 MEAC)
- Head coach: Stan Waterman (6th season)
- Assistant coaches: Horace Owens; Vernon Dupree Jr.; Shahid Perkins
- Home arena: Memorial Hall

2026–27 MEAC men's basketball standings
	Conf.				Overall
Team	W		L	PCT	W		L	PCT
Morgan State	0	–	0	–	4	–	2	.667
South Carolina State	0	–	0	–	3	–	2	.600
Howard	0	–	0	–	3	–	3	.500
Delaware State	0	–	0	–	2	–	3	.400
Norfolk State	0	–	0	–	2	–	4	.333
Coppin State	0	–	0	–	1	–	5	.167
Maryland Eastern Shore	0	–	0	–	1	–	5	.167
North Carolina Central	0	–	0	–	1	–	5	.167
† 2027 MEAC tournament winner As of November 21, 2026; Rankings from AP poll

The 2026–27 Delaware State Hornets men's basketball team will represent Delaware State University during the 2026–27 NCAA Division I men's basketball season. The Hornets, led by sixth-year head coach Stan Waterman, will play their home games at Memorial Hall in Dover, Delaware, as members of the Mid-Eastern Athletic Conference.

== Previous season ==
The Hornets finished the 2025–26 season 8–23, 2–12 in conference play. As the seven seed in the MEAC Tournament, they would upset the two seed Morgan State in the quarterfinals before losing in the semifinals to the three seed North Carolina Central.

== Preseason ==
On October 21, 2026, the Mid-Eastern Athletic Conference released their preseason polls. Delaware State was picked to finish tied for sixth in the conference, alongside Coppin State.

=== Preseason rankings ===
MEAC Preseason Poll
Place	Team	Votes
1	Howard	62 (6)
2	Morgan State	46 (1)
3	Norfolk State	43 (1)
4	North Carolina Central	42
5	South Carolina State	36
T-6	Delaware State	20
T-6	Coppin State	20
8	Maryland Eastern Shore	18
(#) first-place votes

=== MEAC Preseason Watch List ===
Each team had two players named to the conference's Preseason Watch List.

MEAC Preseason Watch List
Player	Year	Position
Nehemiah Reedus	Senior	Forward
Rahmir Moore	5th Year	Guard

== Roster ==
2026–27 Delaware State Hornets men's basketball team
Players
Coaches

Pos.	#	Name	Height	Weight	Year	Previous school	Hometown
G	0	Rahmir Moore	6 ft 3 in (1.91 m)	205 lb (93 kg)	GS	Wagner	Philadelphia, Pennsylvania
G	1	Nicholas Baysah Jr.	5 ft 11 in (1.8 m)	170 lb (77 kg)	Fr	Howard High School	Newark, Delaware
G	2	Anthony Parker	6 ft 3 in (1.91 m)	210 lb (95 kg)	Jr	Franklin Pierce	Middletown, Connecticut
PG	3	Nasir Muhammad	6 ft 1 in (1.85 m)	200 lb (91 kg)	Sr	Albany	Brooklyn, New York
F	5	Gideon Ekukwai	6 ft 9 in (2.06 m)	230 lb (104 kg)	Fr	Bridgeport Prep	Kampala, Uganda
G	8	Jalen St. Clair	6 ft 1 in (1.85 m)	165 lb (75 kg)	So	Coronado High School	Bethesda, Maryland
SG	10	Nehemiah Reedus	6 ft 7 in (2.01 m)	195 lb (88 kg)	Sr	Southwest Baptist	St. Louis, Missouri
SG	11	Isaiah Sullivan	6 ft 7 in (2.01 m)	190 lb (86 kg)	Sr	Bridgeport	Bridgeport, Connecticut
G	22	Dean Shepherd	6 ft 3 in (1.91 m)	180 lb (82 kg)	Sr	Tower Hill School	New Castle, Delaware
F	23	Tre Hawkins	6 ft 8 in (2.03 m)	216 lb (98 kg)	Jr	Wilmington	Waldorf, Maryland
F	24	Joshua Obiora	6 ft 8 in (2.03 m)	212 lb (96 kg)	Fr	St. Georges Technical High School	Newark, Delaware
F	34	Farouk Muntari	6 ft 8 in (2.03 m)	200 lb (91 kg)	Fr	Union Catholic High School	Madina, Ghana
F	35	Muazibini Adamu	6 ft 10 in (2.08 m)	211 lb (96 kg)	Sr	Harcum College	Accra, Ghana
F	37	Ademar Santos	6 ft 8 in (2.03 m)	201 lb (91 kg)	Sr	Harcum College	Stockholm, Sweden

Head coach

- Stan Waterman (Delaware)

Assistant coach(es)

- Vernon Dupree Jr. (Wilmington)
- Horace Owens (Rhode Island)
- Shahid Perkins (East Tennessee State)

Legend

- (C) Team captain
- (S) Suspended
- (I) Ineligible
- (W) Walk-on
- Injured
- Current redshirt

Roster
Last update: November 8, 2026

== Schedule and results ==
Date time, TV	Rank^{#}	Opponent^{#}	Result	Record	Site (attendance) city, state
Non-conference regular season
November 2, 2026*; 7:00 pm		Saint Vincent	W 86–52	1–0	Memorial Hall (518); Dover, DE
November 5, 2026*; 7:00 pm, ESPN+		at Navy	L 60–66	1–1	Alumni Hall (650); Annapolis, MD
November 10, 2026*; 6:30 pm, ESPN+		at Georgetown	L 78–83	1–2	McDonough Gymnasium (1,154); Washington, D.C.
November 14, 2026*; 4:00 pm, ESPN+		at East Carolina	L 48–72	1–3	Williams Arena (2,788); Greenville, NC
November 17, 2026*; 7:00 pm		Cheyney	W 90–70	2–3	Memorial Hall (532); Dover, DE
November 20, 2026*; 7:00 pm, MEAC Network		Niagara	L 101–103 ^{2OT}	2–4	Memorial Hall (195); Dover, DE
November 24, 2026*; 7:00 pm, ESPN+		at Chattanooga			McKenzie Arena; Chattanooga, TN
November 28, 2026*; 2:00 pm		at North Carolina A&T			Corbett Sports Center; Greensboro, NC
December 1, 2026*; 7:30 pm		New Haven			Memorial Hall; Dover, DE
December 5, 2026*; 2:00 pm		UMBC			Memorial Hall; Dover, DE
December 8, 2026*; 7:30 pm		Binghamton			Memorial Hall; Dover, DE
December 12, 2026*; 2:00 pm		Longwood			Memorial Hall; Dover, DE
December 15, 2026*; 7:00 pm, truTV		at UConn			PeoplesBank Arena; Hartford, CT
December 19, 2026*; 1:00 pm		Franklin Pierce			Memorial Hall; Dover, DE
December 29, 2026*; 7:00 pm, Peacock		at Rutgers			Jersey Mike's Arena; Piscataway, NJ
MEAC regular season
January 2, 2027; 5:00 pm		at Coppin State			Physical Education Complex; Baltimore, MD
January 9, 2027; 4:30 pm		at Norfolk State			Echols Hall; Norfolk, VA
January 11, 2027; 7:00 pm		Howard			Memorial Hall; Dover, DE
January 16, 2027; 4:00 pm		at Morgan State			Hill Field House; Baltimore, MD
January 23, 2027; 5:00 pm		North Carolina Central			Memorial Hall; Dover, DE
January 25, 2027; 7:00 pm		South Carolina State			Memorial Hall; Dover, DE
January 30, 2027; 3:30 pm		at Maryland Eastern Shore			Hytche Athletic Center; Princess Anne, MD
February 6, 2027; 5:00 pm		Coppin State			Memorial Hall; Dover, DE
February 13, 2027; 5:00 pm		Norfolk State			Memorial Hall; Dover, DE
February 15, 2027; 7:30 pm		at Howard			Burr Gymnasium; Washington, D.C.
February 20, 2027; 5:00 pm		Morgan State			Memorial Hall; Dover, DE
February 27, 2027; 5:00 pm		at North Carolina Central			McDougald–McLendon Arena; Durham, NC
March 1, 2027		at South Carolina State			SHM Memorial Center; Orangeburg, SC
March 4, 2027; 7:30 pm		North Carolina Central			Memorial Hall; Dover, DE
*Non-conference game. ^{#}Rankings from AP poll. (#) Tournament seedings in parentheses. All times are in Eastern.
