= Brunswick Community College =

College in Bolivia, North Carolina, U.S.

Coordinates: 34.0389°N 78.2297°W

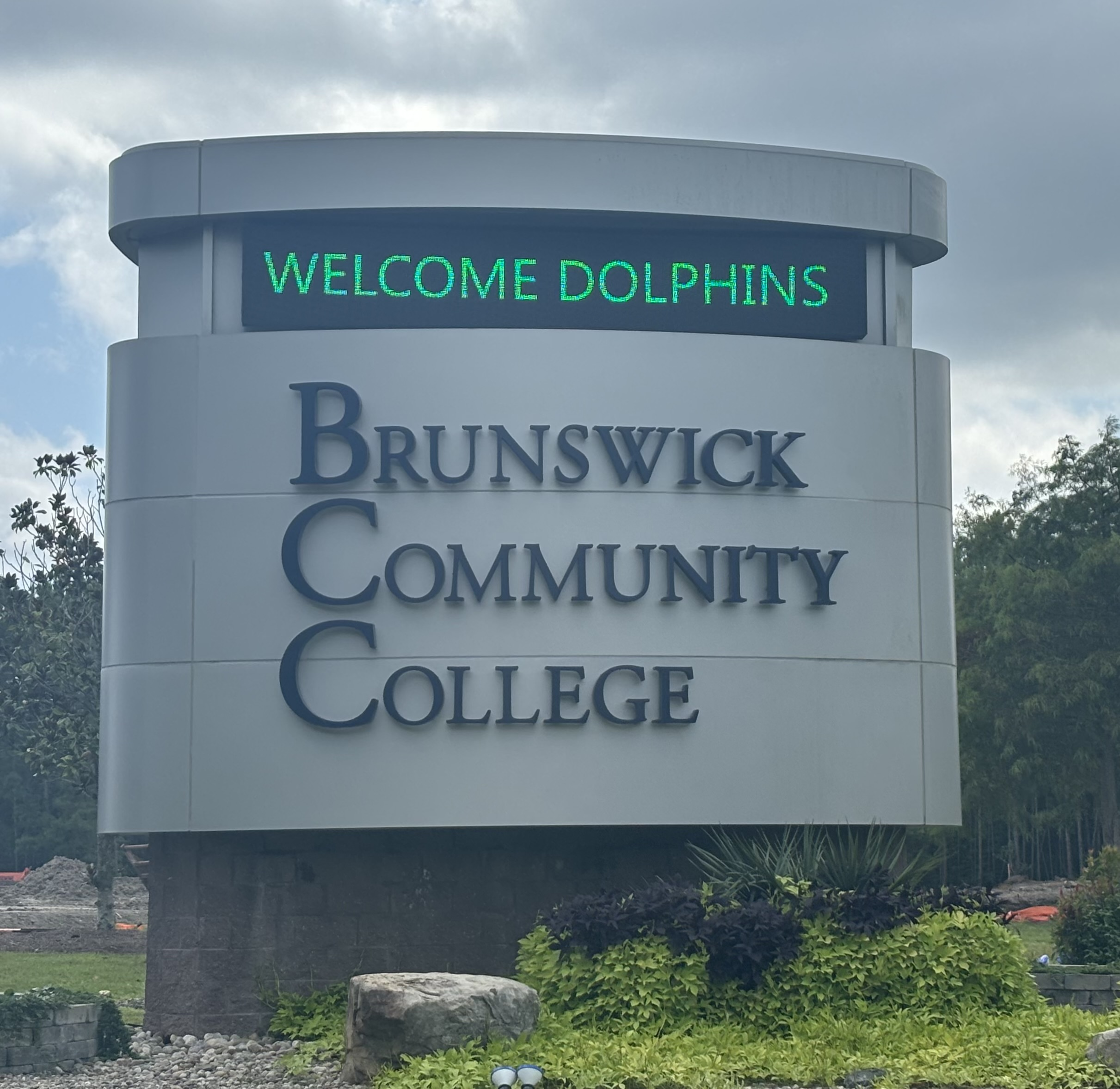
- Brunswick Community College
- Type: Public community college
- Established: 1979
- Parent institution: North Carolina Community College System
- President: Gene Smith
- Faculty: 44 full-time faculty
- Students: 1,845 (fall 2023)
- Location: Bolivia, North Carolina, United States
- Campus: Rural
- Colors: Teal, navy, and white
- Nickname: Dolphins
- Mascot: Duncan the Dolphin
- Website: www.brunswickcc.edu

Brunswick Community College (BCC) is a public community college in Bolivia, North Carolina. The service area of Brunswick Community College includes Brunswick and New Hanover counties with the main campus located in Bolivia. BCC contains two other campuses, one in Leland and one in Southport.

== History ==
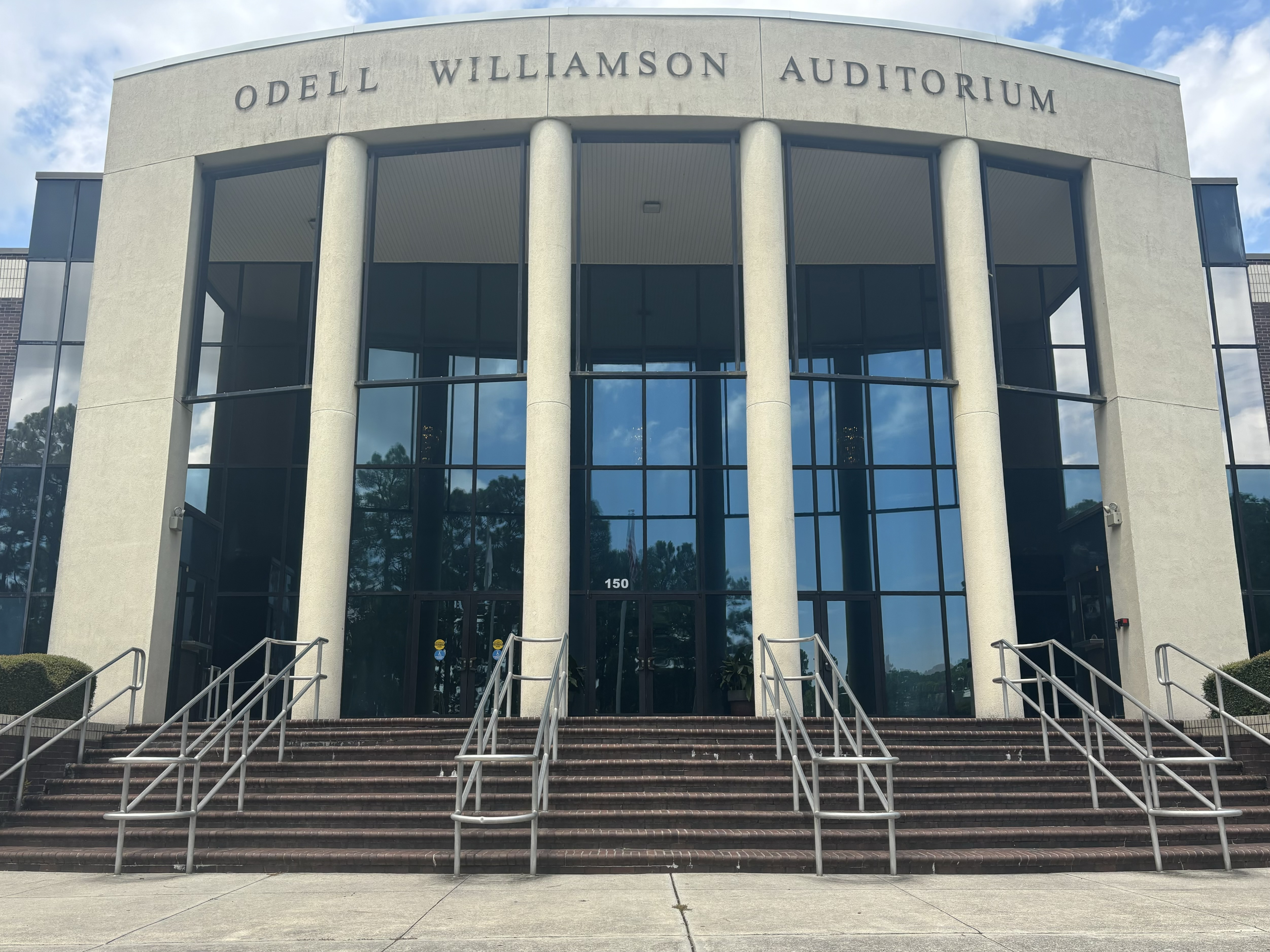
Odell Williamson Audirorium

Brunswick Community College was established in July 1979, known then as Brunswick Technical Institute. In October of the same year, the Brunswick County Board of Commissioners voted to change the name to Brunswick Technical College. The original building was a 3,732 square foot cinder block building that had been donated to Brunswick County in 1950. The first building built on the permanent campus was completed in 1983. The College was accredited in 1983 by the Southern Association of Colleges and Schools. In 1988 County Commissioners changed the name to Brunswick Community College, to standardize the name with other North Carolina Colleges. Odell Williamson, a Brunswick County politician and businessman, donated $500,000 in 1989 to fund the construction of a 1,500 seat auditorium on Brunswick Community College's campus.

== Athletics ==
The BCC athletic teams for both men and women are known as the Dolphins. The school is a member of the Carolinas Junior College Conference for athletics under the aegis of the National Junior College Athletic Association. The college offers men's and women's basketball, baseball, and softball.

BCC plays basketball on campus at the Fitness & Aquatics Center, while the baseball team plays at Founders Field and softball plays at Lockwood Folly Park.
