= 2026–27 Tennessee Tech Golden Eagles men's basketball team =

American college basketball season

2026–27 Tennessee Tech Golden Eagles men's basketball
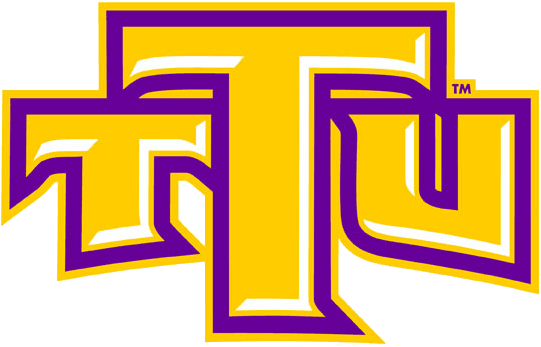
- Conference: Southern Conference
- Record: 2–1 (0–0 SoCon)
- Head coach: Tobin Anderson (1st season)
- Associate head coach: Matt Capell (1st season)
- Assistant coaches: Tom Bonacum (1st season); Dan Gearin (1st season); Jamal Johnson (1st season); Kam Murrell (1st season)
- Home arena: Hooper Eblen Center

2026–27 Southern Conference men's basketball standings
	Conf.				Overall
Team	W		L	PCT	W		L	PCT
Furman	0	–	0	–	3	–	0	1.000
The Citadel	0	–	0	–	1	–	1	.500
Samford	0	–	0	–	1	–	1	.500
Tennessee Tech	0	–	0	–	2	–	1	.667
UNC Greensboro	0	–	0	–	1	–	1	.500
Western Carolina	0	–	0	–	1	–	1	.500
Mercer	0	–	0	–	1	–	2	.333
VMI	0	–	0	–	1	–	2	.333
Wofford	0	–	0	–	1	–	2	.333
Chattanooga	0	–	0	–	0	–	2	.000
East Tennessee State	0	–	0	–	0	–	2	.000
† 2027 SoCon tournament winner As of November 9, 2026; Rankings from AP poll

The 2026–27 Tennessee Tech Golden Eagles men's basketball team represents Tennessee Technological University during the 2026–27 NCAA Division I men's basketball season. The Golden Eagles are led by first-year head coach Tobin Anderson, and play their home games at Hooper Eblen Center in Cookeville, Tennessee as members of the Southern Conference.

== Previous season ==
The Golden Eagles finished the 2025–26 season 13–18, 8–12 in OVC play to finish in a tie for eighth place. The Golden Eagles did not qualify for the OVC tournament.

On March 3, 2026, the school fired John Pelphrey as a result of missing the OVC tournament.

Nine days later, on March 12, the school hired former Fairleigh Dickinson coach Tobin Anderson to take over the program. Anderson was well known for taking the 16th-seeded Knights into the NCAA tournament, and upsetting the No. 1 seed Purdue, before losing to Florida Atlantic in the second round.

On August 13, 2025, it was announced that Tennessee Tech would be leaving the Ohio Valley Conference after 77 years to join the Southern Conference. The move was made official on July 1, 2026.

== Preseason ==
On October 7, 2026, the Southern Conference announced their preseason rankings. Tennessee Tech was picked to finish sixth in the conference.

=== Preseason rankings ===
SoCon Preseason Coaches Poll
Place	Team	Votes
1	Furman	100 (10)
2	East Tennessee State	86 (1)
3	Wofford	78
4	Samford	70
5	Chattanooga	59
6	Tennessee Tech	57
7	Mercer	47
8	Western Carolina	41
9	VMI	32
10	The Citadel	21
11	UNC Greensboro	14
(#)first-place votes

== Roster ==
2026–27 Tennessee Tech Golden Eagles men's basketball team
Players
Coaches

Pos.	#	Name	Height	Weight	Year	Hometown
G	0	Kamai Samuels	6 ft 2 in (1.88 m)	185 lb (84 kg)	Fr	Montreal, Quebec
F	1	De'Ante Green	6 ft 9 in (2.06 m)	210 lb (95 kg)	Sr	Asheville, NC
G	2	Ty Owens	6 ft 0 in (1.83 m)	185 lb (84 kg)	Sr	Port St. Lucie, FL
G	3	Davante Hackett	6 ft 3 in (1.91 m)	180 lb (82 kg)	Sr	Brampton, Ontario
F	4	Mekhi Turner	6 ft 8 in (2.03 m)	215 lb (98 kg)	Jr	Atlanta, GA
G	5	Cbo Newton	6 ft 3 in (1.91 m)	190 lb (86 kg)	Jr	Ruston, LA
G	6	CohenJ Gonzales	5 ft 9 in (1.75 m)	165 lb (75 kg)	Sr	Gilbert, AZ
G	7	Trent Mosquera	6 ft 5 in (1.96 m)	210 lb (95 kg)	RS Sr	Boston, MA
G	10	Caleb Hollenbeck	6 ft 4 in (1.93 m)	189 lb (86 kg)	Sr	Rapid City, SD
F	11	Caleb Sanders	6 ft 6 in (1.98 m)	185 lb (84 kg)	So	Tampa, FL
F	12	Shaun Arnold	6 ft 5 in (1.96 m)	205 lb (93 kg)	Sr	Indianapolis, IN
G	13	Jake Pampolina	5 ft 10 in (1.78 m)	170 lb (77 kg)	Fr	Suffern, NY
F	20	Kyler Fox	6 ft 8 in (2.03 m)	210 lb (95 kg)	So	Chattahoochee Hills, GA
F	22	Dane Christensen	6 ft 8 in (2.03 m)	220 lb (100 kg)	Jr	Orem, UT
G	24	Harrison Stewart	6 ft 2 in (1.88 m)	175 lb (79 kg)	Fr	Birmingham, AL

Head coach

- Tobin Anderson (Wesleyan)

Assistant coach(es)

- Matt Capell (Alfred)
- Tom Bonacum (Ramapo)
- Dan Gearin (South Florida)
- Jamal Johnson (South Florida)
- Kam Murrell (St. Thomas Aquinas)

Legend

- (C) Team captain
- (S) Suspended
- (I) Ineligible
- (W) Walk-on
- Injured
- Current redshirt

Roster
Last update: 2026-11-06

== Schedule and results ==
Date time, TV	Rank^{#}	Opponent^{#}	Result	Record	Site (attendance) city, state
Non-conference regular season
November 2, 2026*; 6:30 p.m., SECN+		at Mississippi State	L 88–106	0–1	Humphrey Coliseum (6,003); Starkville, MS
November 4, 2026*; 6:30 p.m., ESPN+		Blue Mountain	W 117–70	1–1	Hooper Eblen Center (1,090); Cookeville, TN
November 8, 2026*; 2:00 p.m., ESPN+		Western Kentucky	W 97–94	2–1	Hooper Eblen Center (2,237); Cookeville, TN
November 12, 2026*; 5:30 p.m., BTN		at Indiana			Simon Skjodt Assembly Hall; Bloomington, IN
November 15, 2026*; 2:00 p.m., ESPN+		Wright State-Lake			Hooper Eblen Center; Cookeville, TN
November 18, 2026*; 5:30 p.m., ESPN+		at UNC Asheville			Kimmel Arena; Asheville, NC
November 21, 2026*; 6:30 p.m., ESPN+		Presbyterian			Hooper Eblen Center; Cookeville, TN
November 24, 2026*; 6:30 p.m., ESPN+		West Georgia			Hooper Eblen Center; Cookeville, TN
November 28, 2026*; 3:00 p.m., ESPN+		at Eastern Kentucky			Baptist Health Arena; Richmond, KY
December 1, 2026*; 6:30 p.m., ESPN+		at Middle Tennessee			Murphy Center; Murfreesboro, TN
December 7, 2026*; 6:30 p.m., ESPN+		Welch			Hooper Eblen Center; Cookeville, TN
December 12, 2026*; 1:30 p.m., CBSSN		at Arizona			McKale Center; Tucson, AZ
Conference regular season
December 5, 2026; 4:00 p.m., ESPN+		Samford			Hooper Eblen Center; Cookeville, TN
December 19, 2026; 12:00 p.m., ESPN+		at The Citadel			McAlister Field House; Charleston, SC
December 22, 2026; 6:30 p.m., ESPN+		Mercer			Hooper Eblen Center; Cookeville, TN
December 30, 2026; 5:00 p.m., ESPN+		at Wofford			Jerry Richardson Indoor Stadium; Spartanburg, SC
January 2, 2027; 3:00 p.m.		at Furman			Timmons Arena; Greenville, SC
January 7, 2027; 6:30 p.m.		VMI			Hooper Eblen Center; Cookeville, TN
January 9, 2027; 6:30 p.m.		UNC Greensboro			Hooper Eblen Center; Cookeville, TN
January 13, 2027; 6:00 p.m.		at East Tennessee State			Freedom Hall Civic Center; Johnson City, TN
January 18, 2027; 8:30 p.m.		at Chattanooga			McKenzie Arena; Chattanooga, TN
January 21, 2027; 6:30 p.m.		Western Carolina			Hooper Eblen Center; Cookeville, TN
January 23, 2027; 4:00 p.m.		Furman			Hooper Eblen Center; Cookeville, TN
January 28, 2027; 6:00 p.m.		at UNC Greensboro			Bodford Arena; Greensboro, NC
January 30, 2027; 12:00 p.m.		at VMI			Cameron Hall; Lexington, VA
February 3, 2027; 5:00 p.m.		at Western Carolina			Ramsey Center; Cullowhee, NC
February 6, 2027; 4:00 p.m.		The Citadel			Hooper Eblen Center; Cookeville, TN
February 10, 2027; 6:30 p.m.		East Tennessee State			Hooper Eblen Center; Cookeville, TN
February 18, 2027; 5:00 p.m.		at Mercer			Hawkins Arena; Macon, GA
February 20, 2027; 5:30 p.m.		at Samford			Pete Hanna Center; Homewood, AL
February 24, 2027; 6:30 p.m.		Wofford			Hooper Eblen Center; Cookeville, TN
February 27, 2027; 6:30 p.m.		Chattanooga			Hooper Eblen Center; Cookeville, TN
*Non-conference game. ^{#}Rankings from AP poll. (#) Tournament seedings in parentheses. All times are in Central.
