= 2025–26 Big 12 Conference men's basketball season =

- League: NCAA Division I
- Sport: Basketball
- Teams: 16
- Total attendance: 2,594,047
- TV partner(s): CBS (CBS, CBS Sports Network), Fox Sports (Fox, FS1, FS2); ESPN (ABC, ESPN, ESPN2, Big 12 Now, ESPNU); TNT Sports (TNT,TBS, TruTV, HBO Max); NBC Sports (Peacock)

2026 NBA draft

Regular season
- Season champions: Arizona (1st title)
- Season MVP: Jaden Bradley, Arizona
- Top scorer: AJ Dybantsa, BYU

Big 12 tournament
- Venue: T-Mobile Center, Kansas City, Missouri
- Champions: Arizona (1st title)
- Tournament MVP: Jaden Bradley, Arizona

Big 12 men's basketball seasons
- ← 2024–25 2026–27 →

2025–26 Big 12 men's basketball standings
	Conf.				Overall
Team	W		L	PCT	W		L	PCT
No. 3 Arizona †	16	–	2	.889	36	–	3	.923
No. 7 Houston	14	–	4	.778	30	–	7	.811
No. 20 Kansas	12	–	6	.667	24	–	11	.686
No. 21 Texas Tech	12	–	6	.667	23	–	11	.676
No. 8 Iowa State	12	–	6	.667	29	–	8	.784
TCU	11	–	7	.611	23	–	12	.657
West Virginia	9	–	9	.500	21	–	14	.600
UCF	9	–	9	.500	21	–	12	.636
Cincinnati	9	–	9	.500	18	–	15	.545
BYU	9	–	9	.500	23	–	12	.657
Colorado	7	–	11	.389	17	–	16	.515
Arizona State	7	–	11	.389	17	–	16	.515
Baylor	6	–	12	.333	17	–	17	.500
Oklahoma State	6	–	12	.333	20	–	15	.571
Kansas State	3	–	15	.167	12	–	20	.375
Utah	2	–	16	.111	10	–	22	.313
† 2026 Big 12 tournament winner Rankings from AP poll

The 2025–26 Big 12 men's basketball season began with the start of the 2025–26 NCAA Division I men's basketball season on November 3, 2025. Regular season conference play started on January 2, 2026 and concluded on March 7, 2026. The 2026 Big 12 men's basketball tournament was held on March 10−14, 2026, at the T-Mobile Center in Kansas City, Missouri.

== Previous season ==
Big 12 regular season and tournament champion Houston received the conference's automatic bid to the 2025 NCAA tournament. They would ultimately lose to Florida in the championship game.

Seven out of the sixteen members were granted bids to the NCAA tournament. Those seven teams were Arizona, Baylor, BYU, Houston, Iowa State, Kansas and Texas Tech.

== Offseason ==
=== Recruiting classes ===
Rankings
Team	ESPN	247 Sports	On3	Signees
Arizona	4	2	3	7
Arizona State	−	53	70	6
Baylor	−	21	53	4
BYU	13	18	6	3
Cincinnati	−	48	44	3
Colorado	−	57	50	6
Houston	2	3	2	4
Iowa State	−	24	36	4
Kansas	18	9	27	6
Kansas State	−	65	105	4
Oklahoma State	−	49	32	3
TCU	−	67	64	2
Texas Tech	−	88	62	2
UCF	−	195	210	1
Utah	−	100	117	2
West Virginia	−	51	63	4

== Coaches ==
=== Coaching changes ===
Coach	School	Reason	Replacement
Josh Eilert (interim)	Utah	Not renewed	Alex Jensen
Darian DeVries	West Virginia	Left for Indiana	Ross Hodge

=== Head coaches ===
Note: Stats are through the beginning of the season. All stats and records are from time at current school only.

Team	Head coach	Previous job	Seasons at school as HC	Overall record at School	Big 12 record	NCAA tournaments	NCAA Final Fours	NCAA championships
Arizona	Tommy Lloyd	Gonzaga (asst.)	5th	112–33 (.772)	14–6 (.700)	4	0	0
Arizona State	Bobby Hurley#	Buffalo	10th	168–150 (.528)	4–16 (.200)	3	0	0
Baylor	Scott Drew	Valparaiso	23rd	466–259 (.643)	199–183 (.521)	13	1	1
BYU	Kevin Young	Phoenix Suns (asst.)	2nd	26–10 (.722)	14–6 (.700)	1	0	0
Cincinnati	Wes Miller∞	UNC Greensboro	5th	81–58 (.583)	32–42 (.432)	0	0	0
Colorado	Tad Boyle	Northern Colorado	16th	312–203 (.606)	11–25 (.306)	6	0	0
Houston	Kelvin Sampson	Houston Rockets (asst.)	12th	299–84 (.781)	34–4 (.895)	7	2	0
Iowa State	T. J. Otzelberger	UNLV	5th	95–45 (.679)	42–32 (.568)	4	0	0
Kansas	Bill Self	Illinois	23rd	609–148 (.804)	283–83 (.773)	20†	3†	2
Kansas State	Jerome Tang ‡	Baylor (asst.)	4th	61–41 (.598)	28–28 (.500)	1	0	0
Oklahoma State	Steve Lutz	Western Kentucky	2nd	17–18 (.486)	7–13 (.350)	0	0	0
TCU	Jamie Dixon	Pittsburgh	10th	176–126 (.583)	69–93 (.426)	4	0	0
Texas Tech	Grant McCasland	North Texas	3rd	51–20 (.718)	26–12 (.684)	2	0	0
UCF	Johnny Dawkins	Stanford	10th	165–119 (.581)	14–24 (.368)	1	0	0
Utah	Alex Jensen	Dallas Mavericks (assistant)	1st	0–0 (–)	0–0 (–)	0	0	0
West Virginia	Ross Hodge	North Texas	1st	0–0 (–)	0–0 (–)	0	0	0

† All of the Jayhawks' postseason victories and 7 of their regular-season wins were vacated from the 2017–18 season. Officially, their record for the season 16–8 overall and 3–5 in conference play. The Jayhawks' regular-season Big 12 championship and their Big 12 tournament championship were vacated. The Jayhawks' entire NCAA tournament appearance from the season was vacated including their Final Four appearance.

‡ Jerome Tang was fired on February 15, 2026 after 25 games into the 2025−26 season. He finished with a record of 71−57 and one NCAA tournament appearance. Assistant coach Matthew Driscoll was named interim head coach for the remainder of the season.

# Following their conference tournament loss to Iowa State, it was announced Bobby Hurley's contract would not be extended in June. He finished his eleven year career with a record of 185−167 and three NCAA tournament appearances.

∞ Following their conference tournament loss to UCF, Wes Miller was fired as head coach of the Cincinnati Bearcats. He finished his five year career with a record of 100−74 and zero NCAA tournament appearances.

== Preseason ==
=== Big 12 media day ===
Big 12 Men's Basketball Media day was held on October 22, 2025 at T-Mobile Center in Kansas City, Missouri, with coverage on ESPNU and ESPN+.

Teams and representatives attending was as follows:

Team	Coach	Player
Arizona	Tommy Lloyd	Tobe Awaka, Jaden Bradley, Koa Peat
Arizona State	Bobby Hurley	Noah Meeusen, Maurice Odum
Baylor	Scott Drew	Obi Agbim, Dan Skillings Jr., Tounde Yessoufou
BYU	Kevin Young	AJ Dybantsa, Richie Saunders, Robert Wright III
Cincinnati	Wes Miller	Kerr Kriisa, Moustapha Thiam, Day Day Thomas
Colorado	Tad Boyle	Bangot Dak, Sebastian Rancik
Houston	Kelvin Sampson	Emanuel Sharp, Milos Uzan, Ramon Walker Jr.
Iowa State	T. J. Otzelberger	Joshua Jefferson, Tamin Lipsey, Milan Momcilovic
Kansas	Bill Self	Flory Bidunga, Darryn Peterson, Tre White
Kansas State	Jerome Tang	Abdi Bashir Jr., PJ Haggerty, Mobi Ikegwuruka
Oklahoma State	Steve Lutz	Parsa Fallah, Robert Jennings II
TCU	Jamie Dixon	Brock Harding, Jayden Pierre
Texas Tech	Grant McCasland	Christian Anderson Jr., JT Toppin
UCF	Johnny Dawkins	Devan Cambridge, Themus Fulks, Riley Kugel
Utah	Alex Jensen	Keanu Dawes, James Okonkwo
West Virginia	Ross Hodge	Jasper Floyd, Honor Huff, Brenen Lorient

=== Big 12 preseason coaches poll ===
The Big 12 preseason coaches poll was released on October 16, 2025. All awards were voted on by the league's 16 head coaches, who could not vote for their own team or players. The Big 12 preseason media poll was released on October 30, 2025.

Big 12 Preseason Coaches Poll

	Big 12 Coaches	Points
1.	Houston	224 (12)
2.	BYU	204 (1)
3.	Texas Tech	200
4.	Arizona	179 (1)
5.	Iowa State	170
6.	Kansas	163
7.	Baylor	137
8.	Cincinnati	120
9.	Kansas State	117
10.	TCU	90
11.	West Virginia	79
12.	Oklahoma State	77
13.	Utah	50
14.	UCF	39
15.	Colorado	37
16.	Arizona State	34
Reference: (#) first-place votes

Big 12 Preseason Media Poll

	Big 12 Media
1.	Houston
2.	Texas Tech
3.	BYU
4.	Arizona
5.	Iowa State
6.	Kansas
7.	Baylor
8.	Kansas State
9.	Cincinnati
10.	TCU
11.	West Virginia
12.	Oklahoma State
13.	Utah
14.	UCF
15.	Colorado
16.	Arizona State

=== Big 12 preseason all-conference ===
All-Big 12 Preseason First team

Player	School	Pos.	Yr.	Ht., Wt.	Hometown (Last School)
AJ Dybantsa†	BYU	F	Fr.	6'9", 195	Brockton, MA (Utah Prep)
Richie Saunders	BYU	G	Sr.	6'5", 200	Riverton, UT (Wasatch Academy)
Emanuel Sharp	Houston	G	R-Sr.	6'3", 205	Tampa, FL (Bishop McLaughlin School)
Joseph Tugler	Houston	F	Jr.	6'8", 230	Monroe, LA (Cypress Falls)
Milos Uzan	Houston	G	Sr.	6'4", 195	Las Vegas, NV (Oklahoma)
Tamin Lipsey	Iowa State	G	Sr.	6'1", 200	Ames, IA (Ames)
Darryn Peterson†	Kansas	G	Fr.	6'5", 205	Canton, OH (Napa Christian)
P.J. Haggerty	Kansas State	G	Jr.	6'4", 195	Crosby, TX (Memphis)
Christian Anderson Jr.	Texas Tech	G	So.	6'9", 195	Atlanta, GA (Oak Hill Academy)
JT Toppin†	Texas Tech	F	Jr.	6'9", 230	Dallas, TX (New Mexico)
† denotes unanimous selection Reference:

- Player of the Year: JT Toppin, Texas Tech
- Co-Newcomer of the Year: LeJuan Watts, Texas Tech
- Freshman of the Year: Darryn Peterson, Kansas

=== Preseason watchlists ===
Below is a table of notable preseason watch lists.

Player	School	Wooden	Naismith	Olson	Robertson	Cousy	West	Erving	Malone	Abdul-Jabbar
Jaden Bradley	Arizona			✓	✓					
Brayden Burries	Arizona						✓			
Koa Peat	Arizona	✓	✓	✓					✓	
Tounde Yessoufou	Baylor							✓		
Michael Rataj	Baylor								✓	
AJ Dybantsa	BYU	✓	✓	✓	✓			✓		
Richie Saunders	BYU	✓	✓		✓		✓			
Robert Wright III	BYU					✓				
Moustapha Thiam	Cincinnati									✓
Chris Cenac Jr.	Houston									✓
Isiah Harwell	Houston							✓		
Joseph Tugler	Houston	✓	✓		✓				✓	
Emanuel Sharp	Houston	✓	✓	✓	✓		✓			
Milos Uzan	Houston	✓	✓			✓				
Joshua Jefferson	Iowa State			✓	✓				✓	
Milan Momcilovic	Iowa State							✓		
Tamin Lipsey	Iowa State	✓	✓	✓	✓	✓				
Flory Bidunga	Kansas									✓
Darryn Peterson	Kansas	✓	✓	✓	✓	✓				
PJ Haggerty	Kansas State	✓	✓	✓	✓		✓			
Anthony Roy	Oklahoma State						✓			
Christian Anderson Jr.	Texas Tech	✓		✓	✓	✓				
LeJuan Watts	Texas Tech							✓		
JT Toppin	Texas Tech	✓	✓	✓	✓				✓	

=== Preseason All-American teams ===
	AP	ESPN 1st Team	ESPN 2nd Team	ESPN 3rd Team	SI 1st Team	SI 3rd Team	Blue Ribbon 1st Team	Blue Ribbon 2nd Team	Blue Ribbon 3rd Team	Blue Ribbon 4th Team
AJ Dybantsa	✓		✓		✓			✓		
PJ Haggerty		✓								✓
Darryn Peterson			✓		✓			✓		
Emanuel Sharp				✓		✓				
Thru 2025–26 Season JT Toppin	✓	✓			✓		✓			
Joseph Tugler									✓	

=== Preseason national polls/ratings ===
	AP	Blue Ribbon; Yearbook	CBS Sports	Coaches	ESPN	FOX Sports	Lindy's; Sports	Sporting News	Kenpom	NCAA Sports	Sports; Illustrated
Arizona	No. 13	No. 22	No. 11	No. 13	No. 13	No. 14	No. 13	No. 7	No. 15	No. 16	No. 13
Arizona State	–	–	–	–	–	–	–	–	No. 75	–	No. 82
Baylor	RV	–	–	RV	–	–	–	No. 23	No. 17	–	No. 30
BYU	No. 8	No. 16	No. 3	No. 8	No. 6	No. 17	–	No. 10	No. 18	No. 14	No. 9
Cincinnati	–	–	–	RV	–	–	–	–	No. 36	–	No. 40
Colorado	–	–	–	–	–	–	–	–	No. 83	–	No. 95
Houston	No. 2	No. 3	No. 2	No. 2	No. 3	No. 3	No. 2	No. 3	No. 1	No. 2	No. 1
Iowa State	No. 16	No. 17	No. 13	No. 18	No. 18	No. 11	No. 16	No. 24	No. 13	No. 18	No. 25
Kansas	No. 19	No. 18	No. 18	No. 19	No. 21	No. 19	No. 19	–	No. 21	No. 10	No. 11
Kansas State	RV	–	–	RV	–	–	–	–	No. 61	No. 33	No. 55
Oklahoma State	–	–	–	RV	–	–	–	–	No. 69	–	No. 63
TCU	–	–	–	–	–	–	–	–	No. 66	–	No. 57
Texas Tech	No. 10	No. 14	No. 7	No. 11	No. 10	No. 5	No. 10	No. 8	No. 12	No. 9	No. 7
UCF	–	–	–	–	–	–	–	–	No. 64	–	No. 89
Utah	–	–	–	–	–	–	–	–	No. 74	–	No. 85
West Virginia	–	–	–	–	–	–	–	–	No. 67	–	No. 68

== Regular season ==
The Conference match ups for each school have yet to be announced.

Key
Schedule	Home & Away Conference Schedule
	Home (H) & Away (A)
	Home Only (H)
	Away Only (A)

	Arizona	Arizona State	Baylor	BYU	Cincinnati	Colorado	Houston	Iowa State	Kansas	Kansas State	Oklahoma State	TCU	Texas Tech	UCF	Utah	West Virginia
vs. Arizona	—	H & A	H	H & A	A	H	H	A	H & A	A	A	H	A	H	H	A
vs. Arizona State	H & A	—	H	H	A	H & A	H	H	A	A	A	H	A	H	H & A	A
vs. Baylor	A	A	—	A	H	A	H & A	H & A	H	H	H	H & A	A	H	A	H
vs. BYU	H & A	A	H	—	H	A	A	A	H	H	H	A	H & A	A	H & A	H
vs. Cincinnati	H	H	A	A	—	A	H & A	A	H	H	A	H	H	H & A	A	H & A
vs. Colorado	A	H & A	H	H	H	—	H	H	A	A	A	A	H & A	A	H & A	H
vs. Houston	A	A	H & A	H	H & A	A	—	H	H	A	H	H	H & A	A	H	A
vs. Iowa State	H	A	H & A	H	H	A	A	—	H & A	H	H & A	H	A	A	H	A
vs. Kansas	H & A	H	A	A	A	H	A	H & A	—	H & A	H	A	H	H	A	H
vs. Kansas State	H	H	A	A	A	H	H	A	H & A	—	H	H & A	H	A	A	H & A
vs. Oklahoma State	H	H	A	A	H	H	A	H & A	A	A	—	H & A	H	H & A	H	A
vs. TCU	A	A	H & A	H	A	H	A	A	H	H & A	H & A	—	H	H	H	A
vs. Texas Tech	H	H	H	H & A	A	H & A	H & A	H	A	A	A	A	—	H	A	H
vs. UCF	A	A	A	H	H & A	H	H	H	A	H	H & A	A	A	—	H	H & A
vs. Utah	A	H & A	H	H & A	H	H & A	A	A	H	H	A	A	H	A	—	H
vs. West Virginia	H	H	A	A	H & A	A	H	H	A	H & A	H	H	A	H & A	A	—

=== Conference matrix ===
	Arizona	Arizona State	Baylor	BYU	Cincinnati	Colorado	Houston	Iowa State	Kansas	Kansas State	Oklahoma State	TCU	Texas Tech	UCF	Utah	West Virginia
vs. Arizona	—	0–2	0–1	0–2	0–1	0–1	0–1	0–1	1–1	0–1	0–1	0–1	1–0	0–1	0–1	0–1
vs. Arizona State	2–0	—	1–0	1–0	0–1	2–0	1–0	1–0	0–1	0–1	0–1	1–0	0–1	1–0	0–2	1–0
vs. Baylor	1–0	0–1	—	1–0	1–0	0–1	2–0	2–0	1–0	1–0	0–1	2–0	1–0	0–1	0–1	0–1
vs. BYU	2–0	0–1	0–1	—	1–0	0–1	1–0	0–1	1–0	0–1	1–0	0–1	1–1	1–0	0–2	1–0
vs. Cincinnati	1–0	1–0	0–1	0–1	—	0–1	2–0	0–1	0–1	0–1	0–1	1–0	1–0	1–1	0–1	2–0
vs. Colorado	1–0	0–2	1–0	1–0	1–0	—	1–0	1–0	1–0	0–1	0–1	0–1	2–0	1–0	0–2	1–0
vs. Houston	1–0	0–1	0–2	0–1	0–2	0–1	—	1–0	1–0	0–1	0–1	0–1	1–1	0–1	0–1	0–1
vs. Iowa State	1–0	0–1	0–2	1–0	1–0	0–1	0–1	—	1–1	0–1	0–2	1–0	1–0	0–1	0–1	0–1
vs. Kansas	1–1	1–0	0–1	0–1	1–0	0–1	0–1	1–1	—	0–2	0–1	0–1	0–1	1–0	0–1	1–0
vs. Kansas State	1–0	1–0	0–1	1–0	1–0	1–0	1–0	1–0	2–0	—	1–0	2–0	1–0	1–0	0–1	1–1
vs. Oklahoma State	1–0	1–0	1–0	0–1	1–0	1–0	1–0	2–0	1–0	0–1	—	2–0	1–0	0–2	0–1	0–1
vs. TCU	1–0	0–1	0–2	1–0	0–1	1–0	1–0	0–1	1–0	0–2	0–2	—	0–1	1–0	1–0	0–1
vs. Texas Tech	0–1	1–0	0–1	1–1	0–1	0–2	1–1	0–1	1–0	0–1	0–1	1–0	—	1–0	0–1	0–1
vs. UCF	1–0	0–1	1–0	0–1	1–1	0–1	1–0	1–0	0–1	0–1	2–0	0–1	0–1	—	0–1	2–0
vs. Utah	1–0	2–0	1–0	2–0	1–0	2–0	1–0	1–0	1–0	1–0	1–0	0–1	1–0	1–0	—	0–1
vs. West Virginia	1–0	0–1	1–0	0–1	0–2	0–1	1–0	1–0	0–1	1–1	1–0	1–0	1–0	0–9	1–0	—
Total	16–2	7–11	6–12	9–9	9–9	7–11	14–4	12–6	12–6	3–15	6–12	11–7	12–6	9–9	2–16	9–9

=== Points scored ===
Team	For	Against	Difference
Arizona	3,360	2,706	654
Arizona State	2,519	2,585	-66
Baylor	2,778	2,599	179
BYU	2,899	2,624	275
Cincinnati	2,413	2,230	183
Colorado	2,645	2,632	13
Houston	2,844	2,306	538
Iowa State	3,033	2,428	605
Kansas	2,629	2,417	212
Kansas State	2,546	2,619	-73
Oklahoma State	2,763	2,780	-17
TCU	2,634	2,445	189
Texas Tech	2,729	2,485	244
UCF	2,575	2,503	72
Utah	2,379	2,531	-152
West Virginia	2,472	2,301	171

=== Multi-Team Events ===
Team	Tournament	Finish
Arizona	−	−
Arizona State	Maui Invitational	2nd
Baylor	Players Era Festival	Consolation Game
BYU	ESPN Events Invitational	1st
Cincinnati	−	−
Colorado	Acrisure Holiday Classic	1st
Houston	Players Era Festival	Consolation Game
Iowa State	Players Era Festival	Consolation Game
Kansas	Players Era Festival	3rd
Kansas State	Hall of Fame Classic	2nd
Oklahoma State	−	−
TCU	Rady Children's Invitational	1st
Texas Tech	Baha Mar Championship	2nd
UCF	Legends Classic	1st
Utah	Acrisure Classic	3rd
West Virginia	Charleston Classic	4th

=== Coast to Coast Challenge ===
Date	Visitor	Home	Site	Significance	Score	Conference record
Dec. 7, 2025	LSU	No. 19 Texas Tech†	Dickies Arena • Fort Worth, TX	USLBM Coast to Coast Challenge	Texas Tech 82−58	Big 12 1−0
Dec. 7, 2025	North Texas	TCU†	Dickies Arena • Fort Worth, TX	USLBM Coast to Coast Challenge	TCU 65−55	Big 12 2−0

Team rankings are reflective of AP poll when the game was played, not current or final ranking

=== Regular season honors ===
==== Big 12 Players of the Week ====
Week	Player of the week	Team	Newcomer of the week	Team
November 10, 2025	Koa Peat; Christian Anderson Jr.	Arizona; Texas Tech	Koa Peat	Arizona
November 17, 2025	Kingston Flemings	Houston	Kingston Flemings	Houston
November 24, 2025	PJ Haggerty	Kansas State	Koa Peat (2)	Arizona
December 1, 2025	Joshua Jefferson	Iowa State	Moe Odum	Arizona State
December 8, 2025	Milan Momcilovic	Iowa State	Tounde Yessoufou	Baylor
December 15, 2025	Melvin Council Jr.	Kansas	Melvin Council Jr.	Kansas
December 22, 2025	Christian Anderson Jr. (2)	Texas Tech	LeJuan Watts	Texas Tech
December 30, 2025	AJ Dybantsa	BYU	AJ Dybantsa	BYU
January 5, 2026	JT Toppin	Texas Tech	AJ Dybantsa (2)	BYU
January 12, 2026	Richie Saunders	BYU	Honor Huff	West Virginia
January 19, 2026	JT Toppin (2)	Texas Tech	Darryn Peterson	Kansas
January 26, 2026	JT Toppin (3)	Texas Tech	AJ Dybantsa (3)	BYU
February 2, 2026	Brayden Burries	Arizona	Brayden Burries	Arizona
February 9, 2026	Flory Bidunga	Kansas	AJ Dybantsa (4)	BYU
February 16, 2026	JT Toppin (4)	Texas Tech	AJ Dybantsa (5)	BYU
February 23, 2026	AJ Dybantsa (2)	BYU	AJ Dybantsa (6)	BYU
March 1, 2026	Christian Anderson Jr. (3)	Texas Tech	Brayden Burries (2)	Arizona
March 9, 2026	Tounde Yessoufou; Isaiah Johnson	Baylor; Colorado	Tounde Yessoufou; Isaiah Johnson	Baylor; Colorado

===== Team Total =====
Team	Total
BYU	9
Texas Tech	8
Arizona	6
Kansas	4
Baylor	3
Colorado	2
Houston	2
Iowa State	2
Arizona State	1
Kansas State	1
West Virginia	1
Cincinnati	0
Oklahoma State	0
TCU	0
UCF	0
Utah	0

==== Big 12 Starting Five ====
Starting in the 2025−26 the Big 12 introduced the Conference Starting Five, which highlights other strong performances from across the Conference. Honorees were determined by a panel of media who cover Big 12 basketball.

Week	Big 12 Starting Five	Team
November 10, 2025	Koa Peat; AJ Dybantsa; Baba Miller; Darryn Peterson; Christian Anderson Jr.	Arizona; BYU; Cincinnati; Kansas; Texas Tech
November 17, 2025	AJ Dybantsa (2); Kingston Flemings; Tamin Lipsey; Flory Bidunga; JT Toppin	BYU; Houston; Iowa St; Kansas; Texas Tech
November 24, 2025	Jaden Bradley; Koa Peat (2); Tamin Lipsey (2); PJ Haggerty; Jamichael Stillwell	Arizona; Arizona; Iowa St; Kansas State; UCF
December 1, 2025	Moe Odum; Cameron Carr; Joshua Jefferson; Flory Bidunga (2); Brock Harding	Arizona State; Baylor; Iowa St; Kansas; TCU
December 8, 2025	Tounde Yessoufou; Kingston Flemings (2); Milan Momcilovic; Parsa Fallah; Christian Anderson Jr. (2)	Baylor; Houston; Iowa State; Oklahoma State; Texas Tech
December 15, 2025	Brayden Burries; AJ Dybantsa (3); Melvin Council Jr. JT Toppin (2); Honor Huff	Arizona; BYU; Kansas; Texas Tech; West Virginia

Week	Big 12 Starting Five	Team
December 22, 2025	Tounde Yessoufou (2); AJ Dybantsa (4); Kingston Flemings (3); Christian Anderson Jr. (3); LeJuan Watts	Baylor; BYU; Houston; Texas Tech; Texas Tech
December 30, 2025	Tounde Yessoufou (3); AJ Dybantsa (5); Baba Miller (2); Joshua Jefferson (2); Christian Anderson Jr. (4)	Baylor; BYU; Cincinnati; Iowa State; Texas Tech
January 5, 2026	AJ Dybantsa (6); Riley Kugel; Joshua Jefferson (3); Milan Momcilovic (2); JT Toppin (3)	BYU; UCF; Iowa State; Iowa State; Texas Tech
January 12, 2026	Massamba Diop; Richie Saunders; Kingston Flemings (4); Darryn Peterson (2); Honor Huff	Arizona State; BYU; Houston; Kansas; West Virginia
January 19, 2026	Jaden Bradley (2); Themus Fulks; Baba Miller (3); Darryn Peterson (3); JT Toppin (4)	Arizona; UCF; Cincinnati; Kansas; Texas Tech
January 26, 2026	AJ Dybantsa (6); Kingston Flemings (5); Milan Momcilovic (3); Xavier Edmonds; JT Toppin (5)	BYU; Houston; Iowa State; TCU; Texas Tech

Week	Big 12 Starting Five	Team
February 2, 2026	Brayden Burries (2); Richie Saunders (2); Themus Fulks (2); Tamin Lipsey (3); Bryson Tiller	Arizona; BYU; UCF; Iowa State; Kansas
February 9, 2026	Cameron Carr (2); AJ Dybantsa (7); Flory Bidunga (3); Kingston Flemings (6); Xavier Edmonds (2)	Baylor; BYU; Kansas; Houston; TCU
February 16, 2026	Tounde Yessoufou (4); AJ Dybantsa (8); Rob Wright; Emanuel Sharp; JT Toppin (6)	Baylor; BYU; BYU; Houston; Texas Tech
February 23, 2026	Anthony Dell’Orso; AJ Dybantsa (9); Moustapha Thiam; Bangot Dak; Themus Fulks (3)	Arizona; BYU; Cincinnati; Colorado; UCF
March 1, 2026	Brayden Burries (3); Cameron Carr (3); Moustapha Thiam (2); Christian Anderson Jr. (5); Donovan Atwell	Arizona; Baylor; Cincinnati; Texas Tech; Texas Tech
March 9, 2026	Tounde Yessoufou (5); AJ Dybantsa (10); Rob Wright (2); Isaiah Johnson; Tre White	Baylor; BYU; BYU; Colorado; Kansas

== Rankings ==
Legend
	Increase in ranking
	Decrease in ranking
	Not ranked previous week
т	Tied with another team in rankings

		Pre	Wk 1	Wk 2	Wk 3	Wk 4	Wk 5	Wk 6	Wk 7	Wk 8	Wk 9	Wk 10	Wk 11	Wk 12	Wk 13	Wk 14	Wk 15	Wk 16	Wk 17	Wk 18	Wk 19	Final
Arizona	AP	13	5	4	2	2	1	1	1	1	1	1	1	1	1	1	4	2	2	2	2	3
Arizona	C	13	6	5	3	3	2	2	2	2	2	1	1	1	1	1	4	2	2	2	2	3
Arizona State	AP						RV	RV	RV	RV												
Arizona State	C																					
Baylor	AP	RV	RV	RV	RV	RV			RV	RV												
Baylor	C	RV	RV	RV	RV	RV	RV															
BYU	AP	8	7	8	9	9	10	10	10	10	9	11	13	13	16	22	23	19	RV	RV	RV	RV
BYU	C	8	7	10	11	10	10	10	10	10	9	11	13	13	14	22	22	23	RV	RV	RV	RV
Cincinnati	AP																					
Cincinnati	C	RV																				
Colorado	AP					RV																
Colorado	C					RV		RV														
Houston	AP	2	1	2	3	8	7	8	8	8	7	7	6	10	8	3	2	5	7	5	5	7
Houston	C	2	2	2	2	7	8	8	8	8	7	7	6	7	8	3	2	4	6	5	5	6
Iowa State	AP	16	16	16	15	10	4	4	3	3	3	2	9	8	7	5	6	4	6	7	6	8
Iowa State	C	18	16	14	13	9	4	4	3	3	3	2	9	9	7	4	6	5	7	7	6	8
Kansas	AP	19	25	24	RV	21	19	17	17	17	21	RV	19	14	11	9	8	14	14	14	17	20
Kansas	C	19	24	23	RV	21	19	17	17	17	22	25	19	14	11	9	8	14	15	16	17	20
Kansas State	AP	RV	RV	RV																		
Kansas State	C	RV	RV																			
Oklahoma State	AP					RV	RV		RV	RV												
Oklahoma State	C	RV				RV	RV	RV	RV	RV	RV											
TCU	AP					RV	RV				RV								RV	RV	RV	RV
TCU	C					RV		RV														
Texas Tech	AP	10	11	15	20	19	16	19	15	15	14	15	12	11	13	16	13	16	10	16	20	21
Texas Tech	C	11	11	15	20	19т	16	19	16	16	14	14	12	11	13	16	13	16	10	14	19	21
UCF	AP										25	RV	RV		RV			RV				
UCF	C											RV			RV				RV			RV
Utah	AP																					
Utah	C																					
West Virginia	AP																					
West Virginia	C																					

== Big 12 records vs other conferences ==
The Big 12 finished with a record of 166–41 in non-conference play during the regular season. The Big 12 has a record of 16–11 during NCAA tournament play.

Regular season

Power 4 Conferences
Conference	Record
ACC	14–10
Big East	7–6
Big Ten	8–9
SEC	16–6
Combined	45–31

Other conferences
Conference	Record
American	5–1
America East	1–0
ASUN	3–0
Atlantic 10	3–0
Big Sky	10–1
Big South	1–0
Big West	5–1
CAA	5–0
CUSA	5–0
Horizon	5–0
Independents/Non-division I	1–0
Ivy League	1–0
Metro Atlantic	4–0
Mid-American	0–2
Mid-Eastern Athletic	3–0
Missouri Valley	0–0
Mountain West	5–2
NEC	4–0
Ohio Valley	3–0
Patriot League	5–0
Southern	4–0
Southland	9–1
Southwestern Athletic	15–0
Summit	7–0
Sun Belt	3–0
West Coast (Note: Gonzaga, playing its final season in the WCC before joining the Pac-12 Conference in July 2026, is widely considered a major program despite its mid-major affiliation. Gonzaga won the only regular-season game it played against Big 12 opposition (namely Arizona State).)	4–2
WAC	10–0
Combined	121–10

Postseason

Power 4 Conferences
Conference	Record
ACC	1–1
Big East	1–1
Big Ten	3–3
SEC	4–5
Combined	9–10

Other conferences
Conference	Record
Atlantic 10	1–0
Big Sky	1–0
Mid-American	1–0
Mountain West	1–0
NEC	1–0
Ohio Valley	1–0
Western Athletic	1–0
Combined	7–0

=== Record against ranked non-conference opponents ===
This is a list of games against ranked opponents only (rankings from the AP Poll at time of the game):

Date	Visitor	Home	Site	Significance	Score	Conference record
Nov. 3	No. 3 Florida	No. 13 Arizona†	T-Mobile Arena ● Paradise, NV	Hall of Fame Series − Las Vegas	No. 13 Arizona 93−87	1−0
Nov. 7	No. 19 Kansas	No. 25 North Carolina	Dean Smith Center ● Chapel Hill, NC	−	North Carolina 87−74	1−1
Nov. 11	No. 11 Texas Tech	No. 14 Illinois	State Farm Center ● Champaign, IL	−	Illinois 81−77	1−2
Nov. 14	No. 6 Michigan	TCU	Schollmaier Arena ● Fort Worth, TX	−	Michigan 67−63	1−3
Nov. 14	No. 19 Gonzaga	Arizona State	Desert Financial Arena ● Tempe, AZ	−	No. 19 Gonzaga 77−65	1−4
Nov. 14	No. 15 UCLA	No. 5 Arizona†	Intuit Dome ● Inglewood, CA	Rivalry/Hall of Fame Series − Los Angeles	Arizona 69−65	2−4
Nov. 15	No. 3 UConn	No. 7 BYU†	TD Garden ● Boston, MA	Hall of Fame Series − Boston	No. 3 UConn 86−84	2−5
Nov. 16	No. 22 Auburn	No. 1 Houston	Legacy Arena ● Birmingham, AL	The Battleground 2k25	No. 1 Houston 73−72	3−5
Nov. 18	No. 5 Duke	No. 24 Kansas†	Madison Square Garden ● New York, NY	State Farm Champions Classic	No. 5 Duke 78−66	3−6
Nov. 19	No. 4 Arizona	No. 3 UConn	Gampel Pavilion ● Storrs, CT	−	No. 4 Arizona 71−67	4−6
Nov. 21	No. 23 Wisconsin	No. 9 BYU†	Delta Center ● Salt Lake City, UT	The Bad Boy Mowers Series - Salt Lake City	No. 9 BYU 98−70	5−6
Nov. 21	No. 6 Louisvile	Cincinnati†	Heritage Bank Center ● Cincinnati, OH	Rivalry/The Hoops Classic	No. 6 Louisville 74−64	5−7
Nov. 24	No. 14 St. John's	No. 15 Iowa State†	Michelob Ultra Arena ● Paradise, NV	Players Era Festival	No. 15 Iowa State−82	6−7
Nov. 25	No. 14 St. John's	Baylor	Michelob Ultra Arena ● Paradise, NV	Players Era Festival	No. 14 St. John's 96−81	6−8
Nov. 25	No. 17 Tennessee	No. 3 Houston†	MGM Grand Garden Arena ● Paradise, NV	Players Era Festival	No. 17 Tennessee 76−73	6−9
Nov. 25	Kansas State	No. 25 Indiana	Simon Skjodt Assembly Hall ● Bloomington, IN	−	No. 25 Indiana 86−69	6−10
Nov. 26	No. 17 Tennessee	Kansas†	MGM Grand Garden Arena ● Paradise, NV	Players Era Festival	Kansas 81−76	7−10
Nov. 27	No. 9 Florida	TCU†	Jenny Craig Pavilion ● San Diego, CA	Rady Children's Invitational	TCU 84−80	8−10
Dec. 1	No. 5 UConn	No. 21 Kansas	Allen Fieldhouse ● Lawrence, KS	−	UConn 61−56	8−11
Dec. 6	No. 10 Iowa State	No. 1 Purdue	Mackey Arena ● West Lafayette, IN	−	No. 10 Iowa State 81−58	9−11
Dec. 6	No. 20 Auburn	No. 2 Arizona	McKale Center ● Tucson, AZ	−	No. 2 Arizona 97−68	10−11
Dec. 13	No. 17 Arkansas	No. 16 Texas Tech†	American Airlines Center ● Dallas, TX	Revocruit Rematch	No. 17 Arkansas 93−86	10−12
Dec. 13	No. 12 Alabama	No. 1 Arizona†	Legacy Arena ● Birmingham, AL	C.M. Newton Classic	No. 1 Arizona 96−75	11−12
Dec. 20	No. 14 Arkansas	No. 8 Houston†	Prudential Center ● Newark, NJ	Never Forget Tribute Classic	No. 8 Houston 94−85	12−12
Dec. 20	No. 3 Duke	No. 19 Texas Tech†	Madison Square Garden ● New York, NY	SentinelOne Classic	No. 19 Texas Tech 82−81	13−12
Feb. 14	No. 24 Louisvile	Baylor†	Dickies Arena ● Fort Worth, TX	−	No. 24 Louisville 82−71	13−13
Mar. 21	No. 1 Duke	TCU†	Bon Secours Wellness Arena ● Greenville, SC	2026 NCAA Tournament	No. 1 Duke 58–81	13−14
Mar. 22	No. 10 St. John's	No. 17 Kansas†	Viejas Arena ● San Diego, CA	2026 NCAA Tournament	No. 10 St. John's 67−65	13−15
Mar. 22	No. 18 Alabama	No. 20 Texas Tech†	Benchmark International Arena ● Tampa, FL	2026 NCAA Tournament	No. 18 Alabama 90−65	13−16
Mar. 26	No. 13 Illinois	No. 5 Houston†	Toyota Center ● Houston, TX	2026 NCAA Tournament − Sweet Sixteen	No. 13 Illinois 65−55	13−17
Mar. 26	No. 14 Arkansas	No. 2 Arizona†	SAP Center ● San Jose, CA	2026 NCAA Tournament − Sweet Sixteen	No. 2 Arizona 109−88	14−17
Mar. 27	No. 23т Tennessee	No. 6 Iowa State†	United Center ● Chicago, IL	2026 NCAA Tournament − Sweet Sixteen	No. 23т Tennessee −	14−18
Mar. 28	No. 8 Purdue	No. 2 Arizona†	SAP Center ● San Jose, CA	2026 NCAA Tournament − Elite Eight	No. 2 Arizona 79−64	15−18
April 4	No. 3 Michigan	No. 2 Arizona†	Lucas Oil Stadium ● Indianapolis, IN	2026 NCAA Tournament − Final Four	No. 3 Michigan 91−73	15−19

† denotes neutral site game

== In-season awards and watchlists ==
=== Midseason watchlists ===
Below is a table of notable Midseason watch lists.

Player	School	Wooden	Tisdale Award	Naismith	Naismith DPOY	Robertson	Cousy	West	Erving	Malone	Abdul-Jabbar
Jaden Bradley	Arizona	✓		✓	✓	✓	✓				
Brayden Burries	Arizona		✓	✓				✓			
Motiejus Krivas	Arizona										✓
Koa Peat	Arizona	✓	✓							✓	
Cameron Carr	Baylor							✓			
Tounde Yessoufou	Baylor								✓		
AJ Dybantsa	BYU	✓	✓	✓		✓			✓		
Keba Keita	BYU				✓						
Richie Saunders	BYU							✓			
Kingston Flemings	Houston	✓	✓	✓		✓	✓				
Emanuel Sharp	Houston	✓						✓			
Joseph Tugler	Houston				✓						
Joshua Jefferson	Iowa State	✓		✓	✓	✓				✓	
Milan Momcilovic	Iowa State								✓		
Tamin Lipsey	Iowa State	✓			✓	✓	✓				
Flory Bidunga	Kansas			✓	✓						✓
Darryn Peterson	Kansas	✓	✓	✓		✓		✓			
PJ Haggerty	Kansas State	✓									
Christian Anderson Jr.	Texas Tech			✓		✓	✓				
JT Toppin	Texas Tech	✓		✓		✓				✓	

=== Coaching Midseason watch lists ===
Coaches	Naismith
Tommy Lloyd	✓
T. J. Otzelberger	✓
Kelvin Sampson	✓
Bill Self	✓

=== Final Season Watchlist ===
Below is a table of notable Midseason watch lists.

Player	School	Wooden	Tisdale Award	Naismith	Naismith DPOY	Olson	Robertson	Cousy	West	Erving	Malone	Abdul-Jabbar
Jaden Bradley	Arizona			✓	✓	✓		✓				
Brayden Burries	Arizona					✓			✓			
AJ Dybantsa	BYU	✓		✓		✓				✓		
Kingston Flemings	Houston	✓		✓		✓		✓				
Emanuel Sharp	Houston					✓			✓			
Joseph Tugler	Houston				✓							
Joshua Jefferson	Iowa State			✓		✓					✓	
Tamin Lipsey	Iowa State				✓							
Milan Momcilovic	Iowa State									✓		
Flory Bidunga	Kansas				✓							✓
Darryn Peterson	Kansas					✓						
Christian Anderson Jr.	Texas Tech	✓				✓						
JT Toppin	Texas Tech	✓				✓						

== Postseason ==
=== Big 12 tournament ===
- The 2026 Big 12 Men's Basketball tournament was played on March 10−14, 2026, at T-Mobile Center, Kansas City, MO

2026 Big 12 men's basketball tournament seeds and results
Seed	School	Conf.	Over.	Tiebreak 1	Tiebreak 2	First round March 10	Second round March 11	Quarterfinals March 12	Semifinals March 13	Championship March 14
1.	Arizona#‡	36–3	16–2			Bye		W vs. UCF	W vs. Iowa State	W vs. Houston
2.	Houston‡	30–7	14–4			Bye		W vs. BYU	Wvs. Kansas	L vs. Arizona
3.	Kansas‡	24–11	12–6	2–1 vs Texas Tech & Iowa State		Bye		W vs. TCU	L vs. Houston	
4.	Texas Tech‡	23–11	12–6	1–1 vs Kansas & Iowa State		Bye		L vs. Iowa State		
5.	Iowa State†	29–8	12–6	1–2 vs Kansas & Texas Tech		Bye	W vs. Arizona State	W vs. Texas Tech	L vs. Arizona	
6.	TCU†	23–12	11–7			Bye	W vs. Oklahoma State	L vs. Kansas		
7.	West Virginia†	21–14	9–9	5–0 vs UCF, Cincinnati & BYU		Bye	L vs. BYU			
8.	UCF†	21–12	9–9	2–3 vs West Virginia, Cincinnati & BYU	1–0 vs TCU	Bye	W vs. Cincinnati ^{OT}	L vs. Arizona		
9.	Cincinnati	18–15	9–9	2–3 West Virginia, UCF & BYU	0–1 vs TCU	W vs. Utah	L vs. UCF ^{OT}			
10.	BYU	23–12	9–9	0–3 vs West Virginia, UCF & Cincinnati		W vs. Kansas State	W vs. West Virginia	L vs. Houston		
11.	Colorado	17–16	7–11	2–0 vs ASU		L vs. Oklahoma State				
12.	Arizona State	17–16	7–11	0–2 vs Colorado		W vs. Baylor	L vs. Iowa State			
13.	Baylor	17–16	6–12	1–0 vs Oklahoma State		L vs. Arizona State				
14.	Oklahoma State	20–15	6–12	0–1 vs Baylor		W vs. Colorado	L vs. TCU			
15.	Kansas State	12–20	3–15			L vs. BYU				
16.	Utah	10–22	2–16			L vs. Cincinnati				
# – Big 12 regular season champions, and tournament No. 1 seed ‡ – Received a double-bye into the conference tournament quarterfinal round † – Received a single-bye into the conference tournament second round Overall records include all games played in the Big 12 tournament.

==== Bracket ====
First round Tuesday, March 10
9	Cincinnati	73
16	Utah	66
12	Arizona State	83
13	Baylor	79
10	BYU	105
15	Kansas State	91
11	Colorado	83
14	Oklahoma State	92

Second round Wednesday, March 11
8	UCF	66^{OT}
9	Cincinnati	65
5	7 Iowa State	91
12	Arizona State	42
7	West Virginia	48
10	BYU	68
6	TCU	95
14	Oklahoma State	86

Quarterfinals; Thursday, March 12
1	2 Arizona	81
8	UCF	59
4	16 Texas Tech	53
5	7 Iowa State	75
2	5 Houston	73
10	BYU	66
3	14 Kansas	78
6	TCU	73

Semifinals; Friday, March 13
1	2 Arizona	82
5	7 Iowa State	80
2	5 Houston	69
3	14 Kansas	47

Championship; Saturday, March 14
1	2 Arizona	79
2	5 Houston	74

Game times are Central Time.

=== NCAA Tournament ===
Seed	Region	School	First round	Second round	Sweet 16	Elite Eight	Final Four	Championship
1	West	Arizona	W 92–58 vs. (16) LIU	W 78–66vs. (9) Utah State	W 109–88 vs. (4) Arkansas	W 79–64 vs. (2) Purdue	L 91–73 vs. (MW1) Michigan	DNP
2	Midwest	Iowa State	W 108–74 vs. (15) Tennessee State	W 82–63 vs. (7) Kentucky	L 76–62 vs. (6) Tennessee	DNP		
2	South	Houston	W 78–47 vs. (15) Idaho	W 88–57 vs. (10) Texas A&M	L 55–65 vs. (3) Illinois	DNP		
4	East	Kansas	W 68–60 vs. (13) Cal Baptist	L 65–67 vs. (5) St. John's	DNP			
5	Midwest	Texas Tech	W 91–71 vs. (12) Akron	L 67–90 vs. (4) Alabama	DNP			
9	East	TCU	W 66−64 vs. (8) Ohio State	L 58–81 vs. (1) Duke	DNP			
6	West	BYU	L 71–79 vs. (11) Texas	DNP				
10	East	UCF	L 71–75 vs. (7) UCLA	DNP				
	8 Bids	W–L (%):	6–2 (.750)	3–3 (.500)	1–2 (.333)	1–0 (1.000)	0–1 (.000)	0–0 (–)
Total: 11–8 (.579)

=== NIT ===
Seed	School	First round	Second round	Quarterfinals	Semifinals	Final
2	Oklahoma State	W 84−80 vs. Davidson	L 70−96 vs. (3) Wichita State	DNP		
	W−L (%):	1–0 (1.000)	0–1 (.000)	0–0 (–)	0–0 (–)	TOTAL: 1–1 (.500)

=== CBC ===
Seed	School	Quarterfinals	Semifinals	Final
	Baylor	W 67−48 vs. Minnesota	L 82−69 vs. Oklahoma	DNP
	Colorado	L 86−90 vs. Oklahoma	DNP	
	West Virginia	W 82−77^{OT} vs. Stanford	W 87−70 vs. Creighton	W 89−82^{OT} vs. Oklahoma
	W-L (%):	2–1 (.667)	1–1 (.500)	TOTAL: 4–2 (.667)

== Postseason honors and awards ==
=== All-Big 12 awards and teams ===
2026 Big 12 Men's Basketball Individual Awards
Award	Recipient(s)
Player of the Year	Jaden Bradley, Arizona
Coach of the Year	Tommy Lloyd, Arizona
Defensive Player of the Year	Flory Bidunga, Kansas
Sixth Man Award	Tobe Awaka, Arizona
Newcomer of the Year	Melvin Council Jr., Kansas
Freshman of the Year	AJ Dybantsa, BYU
Most Improved Player	Christian Anderson Jr., Texas Tech

2026 Big 12 Men's Basketball All-Conference Teams
First Team	Second Team	Third Team	Defensive Team	Newcomer Team	Freshman Team
Jaden Bradley, Arizona; Brayden Burries, Arizona; Motiejus Krivas, Arizona; AJ Dybantsa, BYU†; Emanuel Sharp, Houston; Kingston Flemings, Houston†; Joshua Jefferson, Iowa State; Flory Bidunga, Kansas; Christian Anderson Jr., Texas Tech; JT Toppin, Texas Tech†	Richie Saunders, BYU; Baba Miller, Cincinnati; Tamin Lipsey, Iowa State; Milan Momcilovic, Iowa State; Darryn Peterson, Kansas	Koa Peat, Arizona; Cameron Carr, Baylor; Robert Wright III, BYU; Themus Fulks, UCF; Xavier Edmonds, TCU	Jaden Bradley, Arizona; Motiejus Krivas, Arizona; Emanuel Sharp, Houston; Joseph Tugler, Houston; Tamin Lipsey, Iowa Stats; Flory Bidunga, Kansas†	Cameron Carr, Baylor; Themus Fulks, UCF; Baba Miller, Cincinnati; Melvin Council Jr., Kansas; Donovan Atwell, Texas Tech	Brayden Burries, Arizona†; Koa Peat, Arizona; AJ Dybantsa, BYU†; Kingston Flemings, Houston†; Darryn Peterson, Kansas†
† - denotes unanimous selection

Honorable Mention: Tobe Awaka (Arizona), Tounde Yessoufou (Baylor), Moustapha Thiam (Cincinnati), Isaiah Johnson (Colorado), Joseph Tugler (Houston), Milos Uzan (Houston), Melvin Council Jr. (Kansas), PJ Haggerty (Kansas State), Parsa Fallah (Oklahoma State), David Punch (TCU), Donovan Atwell (Texas Tech), Honor Huff (West Virginia), Terrence Brown (Utah)

==== Big 12 All-Tournament Team ====
Name	Pos.	Height	Weight	Year	Team
Jaden Bradley	G	6'3	200	Sr.	Arizona
Brayden Burries	G	6'3	185	Fr.	Arizona
AJ Dybantsa	G	6'9	185	Fr.	BYU
Joseph Tugler	F	6'8	230	Jr.	Houston
Milan Momcilovic	F	6'8	225	Jr.	Iowa State

=== Most Outstanding Player ===
Name	Pos.	Height	Weight	Year	Team
Jaden Bradley	G	6'3	200	Sr.	Arizona

==== All-Americans ====
To earn "consensus" status, a player must win honors based on a point system computed from the four different all-America teams. The point system consists of three points for first team, two points for second team and one point for third team. No honorable mention or fourth team or lower are used in the computation. The top five totals plus ties are first team and the next five plus ties are second team.

Player	School	Position	Selector	Consensus
First Team All-Americans
AJ Dybantsa	BYU	SF	AP, NABC, TSN, USBWA	✓
Joshua Jefferson	Iowa State	PF	TSN	
JT Toppin	Texas Tech	PF	AP	
Second Team All-Americans
Kingston Flemings	Houston	PG	NABC, TSN, USBWA	✓
Joshua Jefferson	Iowa State	PF	AP, NABC, USBWA	✓
JT Toppin	Texas Tech	PF	NABC, TSN, USBWA	✓
Third Team All-Americans
Christian Anderson Jr.	Texas Tech	PG	AP, TSN, USBWA	✓
Jaden Bradley	Arizona	PG	NABC, TSN, USBWA	✓
Kingston Flemings	Houston	PG	AP	

*Associated Press All-America Team
*NABC All-America Team
*Sporting News All-America Team
*USBWA All-America Team

==== National Awards ====
The following coaches and players won a national award given out by one of the major college basketball publications.

Coach	School	Award
Tommy Lloyd	Arizona	The Sporting News Coach of the Year
Tommy Lloyd	Arizona	Naismith Coach of the Year

==== 2025–26 Big 12 season statistic leaders ====
Scoring leaders
Rk	Player	PTS	PPG
1	AJ Dybantsa	886	25.3
2	PJ Haggerty	725	23.4
3	Terrence Brown	636	19.9
4	Cameron Carr	613	19.2
5	Christian Anderson Jr.	611	18.5

Rebound leaders
Rk	Player	REB	RPG
1	Baba Miller	320	10.3
2	Tobe Awaka	335	9.3
3	Flory Bidunga	314	9.0
4	Keanu Dawes	281	8.8
5	Motiejus Krivas	295	8.2

Field goal leaders (avg 5 fga/gm)
Rk	Player	FG	FGA	PCT
1	Flory Bidunga	197	308	64.0%
2	Massamba Diop	169	297	56.9%
3	Koa Peat	177	332	53.3%
4	Barrington Hargress	169	318	53.1%
5	Moustapha Thiam	160	305	52.5%

Assist leaders
Rk	Player	AST	APG
1	Christian Anderson Jr.	244	7.4
2	Themus Fulks	212	6.6
3	Maurice Odum	187	5.7
4	Brock Harding	189	5.6
5	Kingston Flemings	188	5.2

Block leaders
Rk	Player	BLK	BPG
1	Flory Bidunga	90	2.6
2	Massamba Diop	69	2.1
3	Motiejus Krivas	69	1.9
4	David Punch	64	1.9
5	Keba Keita	58	1.8

Free throw leaders
Rk	Player	FT	FTA	PCT
1	Emanuel Sharp	123	138	89.1%
2	Tre White	123	141	87.2%
3	Sebastian Rancik	111	129	86.0%
4	Anthony Roy	115	134	85.8%
5	Honor Huff	127	148	85.8%

Steal leaders
Rk	Player	STL	SPG
1	Tamin Lipsey	76	2.3
2	Nate Johnson	71	2.2
3	Tounde Yessoufou	65	2.0
4	Jasper Floyd	61	1.9
5	Brock Harding	56	1.6

Three point leaders
Rk	Player	3P	3PA	%
1	Milan Momcilovic	134	272	49.3%
2	Donovan Atwell	130	284	45.8%
3	Christian Anderson Jr.	108	260	41.5%
4	Anthony Roy	90	227	39.6%
5	Maurice Odum	94	236	37.5%

== TV networks ==
Team	ESPN	ESPN2	ESPNU	ABC	FOX	FS1	CBS	CBSSN	TBS	TNT	TruTV	Streaming (ESPN+/Peacock/Big12 Now/FloSports)
Arizona	14	3	0	1	0	4	2	1	1	5	1	7
Arizona State	4	5	0	0	0	4	0	5	0	5	0	10
Baylor	4	6	0	0	2	3	1	1	0	2	3	12
BYU	11	6	0	0	3	2	1	1	1	2	0	8
Cincinnati	2	6	2	0	2	2	1	4	0	2	0	12
Colorado	1	2	1	0	0	4	0	4	0	4	1	16
Houston	8	5	0	1	2	3	2	1	1	5	1	8
Iowa State	8	2	1	1	1	5	4	1	1	1	2	10
Kansas	13	3	0	1	4	1	4	0	0	3	0	6
Kansas State	0	3	1	0	4	4	2	4	0	0	0	14
Oklahoma State	1	7	1	0	1	1	1	6	0	2	0	15
TCU	4	8	1	0	1	3	2	1	0	4	0	11
Texas Tech	7	6	0	0	2	3	1	3	1	1	1	9
UCF	2	4	1	0	0	3	0	3	1	0	0	19
Utah	2	2	1	0	2	4	0	4	0	1	0	16
West Virginia	1	6	2	0	5	6	1	3	0	0	0	11
Total	82	74	11	4	28	52	21	43	6	37	9	184

== Home game attendance ==
Team	Stadium	Capacity	Game 1	Game 2	Game 3	Game 4	Game 5	Game 6	Game 7	Game 8	Game 9	Game 10	Game 11	Game 12	Game 13	Game 14	Game 15	Game 16	Game 17	Game 18	Game 19	Total	Average	% of Capacity
Arizona	McKale Center	14,688	14,082	13,740	13,556	13,461	**14,688**†	13,092	14,378	14,501	14,357	**14,688**†	14,380	**14,688**†	**14,688**†	**14,688**†	**14,688**†	**14,688**†	**14,688**†			243,051	14,297	97.3%
Arizona State	Desert Financial Arena	14,198	7,513	5,862	10,016	5,925	7,250	7,896	7,377	7,133	7,153	6,950	13,838†	5,809	6,874	7,718	10,452					117,766	7,851	55.3%
Baylor	Foster Pavilion	7,500	6,422	6,542	7,119	7,082	4,584	7,019	7,065	7,018	7,287	7,335†	7,349	7,124	7,012	7,371	7,044	7,126	7,011			117,510	6,912	92.1%
BYU	Marriott Center	17,978	17,918	**18,299**†	17,982	17,936	17,958	**17,998**	**18,009**	**17,983**	**18,224**	**18,239**	**18,177**	**18,163**	**18,046**	**18,062**	**18,104**					271,098	18,073	100.5%
Cincinnati	Fifth Third Arena	12,012	9,126	10,009	11,815†	9,007	8,774	9,853	8,092	7,757	9,793	11,062	9,331	10,551	9,982	10,215	9,969	9,988	9,993	**12,012**†		177,329	9,852	82.0%
Colorado	CU Events Center	11,064	5,771	5,289	6,596†	5,047	5,209	4,931	5,229	101	8,347	6,768	8,232	8,356	6,528	6,719	6,820	6,771	8,953			105,667	6,215	53.1%
Houston	Fertitta Center	7,100	7,035	7,035	7,035	7,035	7,035	7,035	7,035	7,035	7,035	7,035	7,035	7,035	7,035	**7,887**†	7,035	7,035				113,412	7,088	99.9%
Iowa State	Hilton Coliseum	14,267	13,332	13,609	13,416	13,429	**14,267**†	13,876	**14,267**†	**14,267**†	**14,267**†	**14,267**†	**14,267**†	**14,267**†	**14,267**†	**14,267**†	**14,267**†	**14,267**†	**14,267**†			238,866	14,051	98.5%
Kansas	Allen Fieldhouse	15,300	**15,300**†	**15,300**†	**15,300**†	**15,300**†	**15,300**†	**15,300**†	**15,300**†	**15,300**†	**15,300**†	**15,300**†	**15,300**†	**15,300**†	**15,300**†	**15,300**†	**15,300**†					214,200	15,300	100.0%
Kansas State	Bramlage Coliseum	11,000	7,765	8,040	7,521	7,123	6,917	9,195†	6,682	7,287	8,163	**11,010**†	7,033	8,061	9,111	8,031	7,274	6,789	8,184	6,705		140,891	7,827	71.7%
Oklahoma State	Gallagher-Iba Arena	13,611	6,211	7,501	5,421	6,251	5,848	4,703	5,906	4,460	5,727	5,057	7,514	6,838	6,280	7,186	7,098	9,085†	5,018	6,200		112,304	6,239	45.9%
TCU	Schollmaier Arena	6,700	4,741	4,432	4,567	6,426†	4,484	5,706	4,262	4,688	4,962	4,857	**6,892**†	6,082	4,942	6,863	5,176	4,944	5,556	5,265	6,260	101,105	5,321	79.4%
Texas Tech	United Supermarkets Arena	15,300	8,056	13,440	13,126	10,441	10,018	9,855	12,814	13,175	13,803	15,098†	15,098†	14,953	13,246	14,644	13,858	15,098†				206,723	12,920	84.4%
UCF	Addition Financial Arena	9,432	6,029	6,018	5,577	5,559	5,173	4,905	5,346	5,195	5,481	8,808	7,899	**10,000**†	6,621	8,511	8,081	6,990	8,735	8,011		122,939	6,830	72.4%
Utah	Jon M. Huntsman Center	15,000	5,932	6,214	6,570†	6,299	6,163	6,163	6,077	6,116	8,339	**15,558**†	6,544	7,293	6,650	7,111	7,686	6,867	6,975			122,557	7,209	48.0%
West Virginia	WVU Coliseum	14,000	10,081	9,251	10,264	12,453	9,360	10,319	9,713	9,803	10,234	9,903	13,743	12,607	13,251	12,009	10,527	13,799†	11,312			188,629	11,095	79.3%
Total		12,447																				2,594,047	9,643	77.5%

Bold – At or exceed capacity
†Season high

== NBA draft ==
The following list includes all Big 12 players who were drafted in the 2026 NBA draft.

Player	Position	School	Round	Pick	Team
AJ Dybantsa	SF	BYU	1st	1	Washington Wizards
Darryn Peterson	SG/PG	Kansas	1st	2	Utah Jazz
Kingston Flemings	PG	Houston	1st	8	Atlanta Hawks
Brayden Burries	SG/PG	Arizona	1st	10	Milwaukee Bucks
Christian Anderson Jr.	PG	Texas Tech	1st	18	Charlotte Hornets
Cameron Carr	PG	Baylor	1st	24	New York Knicks
Chris Cenac Jr.	PF	Houston	1st	27	Boston Celtics
Joshua Jefferson	PF	Iowa State	1st	28	Minnesota Timberwolves
Koa Peat	PF	Arizona	1st	30	Dallas Mavericks
Richie Saunders	SG	BYU	2nd	32	Memphis Grizzlies
Baba Miller	PF	Cincinnati	2nd	36	Los Angeles Clippers
Emanuel Sharp	SG	Houston	2nd	45	Sacramento Kings
Jaden Bradley	PG	Arizona	2nd	50	Toronto Raptors
