= 2026 Big 12 men's basketball tournament =

American college basketball competition

- Classification: Division I
- Season: 2025–26
- Teams: 16
- Site: T-Mobile Center; Kansas City, Missouri
- Champions: Arizona (1st title)
- Winning coach: Tommy Lloyd (1st title)
- MVP: Jaden Bradley (Arizona)
- Attendance: 107,974
- Television: ESPN, ESPN2, ESPNU, ESPN+

2025–26 Big 12 men's basketball standings
	Conf.				Overall
Team	W		L	PCT	W		L	PCT
No. 3 Arizona †	16	–	2	.889	36	–	3	.923
No. 7 Houston	14	–	4	.778	30	–	7	.811
No. 20 Kansas	12	–	6	.667	24	–	11	.686
No. 21 Texas Tech	12	–	6	.667	23	–	11	.676
No. 8 Iowa State	12	–	6	.667	29	–	8	.784
TCU	11	–	7	.611	23	–	12	.657
West Virginia	9	–	9	.500	21	–	14	.600
UCF	9	–	9	.500	21	–	12	.636
Cincinnati	9	–	9	.500	18	–	15	.545
BYU	9	–	9	.500	23	–	12	.657
Colorado	7	–	11	.389	17	–	16	.515
Arizona State	7	–	11	.389	17	–	16	.515
Baylor	6	–	12	.333	17	–	17	.500
Oklahoma State	6	–	12	.333	20	–	15	.571
Kansas State	3	–	15	.167	12	–	20	.375
Utah	2	–	16	.111	10	–	22	.313
† 2026 Big 12 tournament winner Rankings from AP poll

The 2026 Big 12 Conference men's basketball tournament (branded as the 2026 Phillips 66 Big 12 Men's Basketball Tournament for sponsorship reasons) was a postseason men's basketball tournament for the Big 12 Conference. It was played from March 10–14, 2026, in Kansas City, Missouri at the T-Mobile Center. The winning team, Arizona, received the conference's automatic bid to the 2026 NCAA tournament.

== Seeds ==
All sixteen teams participated in the tournament. The top eight teams received a first round bye and the top four teams received a double bye into the quarterfinals.

Teams were seeded by record within the conference. Ties were broken by head-to-head results, then results vs. the top seed in the conference and going down the standings until the tie was broken.

Seed	School	Conference records	Tiebreak 1	Tiebreak 2
1	Arizona#‡	16–2		
2	Houston‡	14–4		
3	Kansas‡	12–6	2–1 vs Texas Tech & Iowa State	
4	Texas Tech‡	12–6	1–1 vs Kansas & Iowa State	
5	Iowa State†	12–6	1–2 vs Kansas & Texas Tech	
6	TCU†	11–7		
7	West Virginia†	9–9	5–0 vs UCF, Cincinnati & BYU	
8	UCF†	9–9	2–3 vs West Virginia, Cincinnati & BYU	1–0 vs TCU
9	Cincinnati	9–9	2–3 vs West Virginia, UCF & BYU	0–1 vs TCU
10	BYU	9–9	0–3 vs West Virginia, UCF & Cincinnati	
11	Colorado	7–11	2–0 vs ASU	
12	Arizona State	7–11	0–2 vs Colorado	
13	Baylor	6–12	1–0 vs Oklahoma State	
14	Oklahoma State	6–12	0–1 vs Baylor	
15	Kansas State	3–15		
16	Utah	2–16		

Notes: # – Big 12 regular season champions, and tournament No. 1 seed
‡ – Received a double-bye into the conference tournament quarterfinal round
† – Received a single-bye into the conference tournament second round
Overall records include all games played in the 2026 Big 12 tournament.

== Schedule ==
Game	Time*	Matchup^{#}	Final score	Television	Attendance
First round – Tuesday, March 10
1	11:30 a.m.	No. 12 Arizona State vs No. 13 Baylor	83–79	ESPN+	7,238
2	2:00 p.m.	No. 9 Cincinnati vs No. 16 Utah	73–66	ESPN+	7,238
3	6:00 p.m.	No. 10 BYU vs No. 15 Kansas State	105–91	ESPN+	12,542
4	8:30 p.m.	No. 11 Colorado vs No. 14 Oklahoma State	83–92	ESPN+	12,542
Second round – Wednesday, March 11
5	11:30 a.m.	No. 5 Iowa State vs No. 12 Arizona State	91–42	ESPN	12,477
6	2:00 p.m.	No. 8 UCF vs No. 9 Cincinnati	66–65^{OT}	ESPNU	12,477
7	6:00 p.m.	No. 7 West Virginia vs No. 10 BYU	48–68	ESPN2	12,811
8	8:30 p.m.	No. 6 TCU vs No. 14 Oklahoma State	95–88	ESPNU	12,811
Quarterfinals – Thursday, March 12
9	11:30 a.m.	No. 4 Texas Tech vs No. 5 Iowa State	53–75	ESPN	14,745
10	2:00 p.m.	No. 1 Arizona vs No. 8 UCF	81–59	ESPN	14,745
11	6:00 p.m.	No. 2 Houston vs No. 10 BYU	73–66	ESPN2	17,015
12	8:30 p.m.	No. 3 Kansas vs No. 6 TCU	78–73	ESPN2	17,015
Semifinals – Friday, March 13
13	6:00 p.m.	No. 1 Arizona vs No. 5 Iowa State	82–80	ESPN	19,450
14	8:30 p.m.	No. 2 Houston vs No. 3 Kansas	69–47	ESPN	19,450
Championship – Saturday, March 14
15	5:00 p.m.	No. 1 Arizona vs No. 2 Houston	79–74	ESPN	11,696
*Game times in CDT. #-Rankings denote tournament seed.

== Bracket ==
First round Tuesday, March 10
9	Cincinnati	73
16	Utah	66
12	Arizona State	83
13	Baylor	79
10	BYU	105
15	Kansas State	91
11	Colorado	83
14	Oklahoma State	92

Second round Wednesday, March 11
8	UCF	66*
9	Cincinnati	65
5	7 Iowa State	91
12	Arizona State	42
7	West Virginia	48
10	BYU	68
6	TCU	95
14	Oklahoma State	88

Quarterfinals; Thursday, March 12
1	2 Arizona	81
8	UCF	59
4	16 Texas Tech	53
5	7 Iowa State	75
2	5 Houston	73
10	BYU	66
3	14 Kansas	78
6	TCU	73

Semifinals; Friday, March 13
1	2 Arizona	82
5	7 Iowa State	80
2	5 Houston	69
3	14 Kansas	47

Championship; Saturday, March 14
1	2 Arizona	79
2	5 Houston	74

* denotes overtime period

== Awards and honors ==
=== Team and tournament leaders ===
Team	Points		Rebounds		Assists		Steals		Blocks		Minutes	
Arizona	Brayden Burries	45	Tobe Awaka	29	Jaden Bradley	12	Brayden Burries	4	Motiejus Krivas	5	Jaden Bradley	97
Arizona State	Santiago Trouet	26	Santiago Trouet	19	Noah Meeusen	5	Maurice Odum	4	Massamba Diop	2	Massamba Diop	63
Baylor	Cameron Carr	25	Cameron Carr	7	Isaac Williams	4	Isaac Williams	3	Tied	1	Obi Agbim	35
BYU	AJ Dybantsa	93	Keba Keita	27	Robert Wright III	17	Keba Keita	6	Dominique Diomande	7	AJ Dybantsa	116
Cincinnati	Moustapha Thiam	32	Baba Miller	26	Baba Miller	10	Tied	2	Moustapha Thiam	7	Baba Miller	79
Colorado	Bangot Dak	22	Bangot Dak	8	Barrington Hargress	9	Bangot Dak	2	Bangot Dak	3	Tied	38
Houston	Kingston Flemings	46	Chris Cenac Jr.	25	Kingston Flemings	14	Kingston Flemings	7	Tied	4	Emanuel Sharp	89
Iowa State	Joshua Jefferson	59	Joshua Jefferson	29	Tamin Lipsey	15	Joshua Jefferson	7	Joshua Jefferson	3	Joshua Jefferson	97
Kansas	Darryn Peterson	38	Flory Bidunga	22	Melvin Council Jr.	9	Darryn Peterson	5	Flory Bidunga	3	Melvin Council Jr.	75
Kansas State	PJ Haggerty	27	Taj Manning	7	Tied	3	Tied	2	Tied	1	PJ Haggerty	37
Oklahoma State	Anthony Roy	49	Christian Coleman	17	Kanye Clary	11	Vyctorius Miller	5	Christian Coleman	5	Christian Coleman	71
TCU	David Punch	50	David Punch	17	Jayden Pierre	8	Tied	2	David Punch	6	David Punch	68
Texas Tech	LeJuan Watts	12	LeJuan Watts	7	Jaylen Petty	4	Tied	2	Tied	1	Jaylen Petty	37
UCF	Jamichael Stillwell	24	Jamichael Stillwell	26	Themus Fulks	9	Jordan Burks	3	John Bol	2	Themus Fulks	75
Utah	Terrence Brown	22	Keanu Dawes	12	Terrence Brown	6	Terrence Brown	2	Tied	1	Seydou Traore	35
West Virginia	Honor Huff	17	Tied	7	Tied	2	Brenen Lorient	2	Honor Huff	3	Honor Huff	37

=== All-Tournament Team ===
Name	Pos.	Height	Weight	Year	Team
Jaden Bradley	G	6'3	200	Sr.	Arizona
Brayden Burries	G	6'3	185	Fr.	Arizona
AJ Dybantsa	G	6'9	185	Fr.	BYU
Joseph Tugler	F	6'8	230	Jr.	Houston
Milan Momcilovic	F	6'8	225	Jr.	Iowa State

=== Most Outstanding Player ===
Name	Pos.	Height	Weight	Year	Team
Jaden Bradley	G	6'3	200	Sr.	Arizona

== Playing surface controversy ==
In February 2026, the Big 12 announced that both the women's and men's tournaments would be played on a glass LED court built by ASB GlassFloor; the technology would allow for video, animated and interactive graphics, and real-time sponsorship placements to be displayed on the court. While a similar court was used for portions of NBA All-Star Weekend in 2024, the women's and men's tournaments marked the first time that a glass court would be used for official competitive play in the United States.

The court faced a mixed reception from players, with some finding the surface to be more slippery than a traditional wooden court. After a first round game between Kansas State and BYU, Kansas State player Taj Manning heavily criticized the court: "The lights and stuff caused [Kansas State player] Khamari [McGriff] to get a migraine. It’s a bad court. They shouldn’t bring it back. It’s just an eyesore. It’s constantly changing and stuff and flashing different lights. Nobody wants to play on that floor."

During a quarterfinal game between Texas Tech and Iowa State, Texas Tech player Christian Anderson Jr. slipped on the court and injured his groin. Shortly after the game, in consultation with the coaches of the remaining teams, the Big 12 announced that the glass court would be removed and replaced with a standard wooden court for the semi-finals onward.
