= 2025–26 UCF Knights men's basketball team =

American college basketball season

2025–26 UCF Knights men's basketball

NCAA tournament, First round
- Conference: Big 12 Conference
- Record: 21–12 (9–9 Big 12)
- Head coach: Johnny Dawkins (10th season)
- Assistant coaches: Robbie Laing (10th season); Tyson Waterman (3rd season); Adam Hood (2nd season); Dwayne Anderson II (1st season)
- Home arena: Addition Financial Arena

2025–26 Big 12 men's basketball standings
	Conf.				Overall
Team	W		L	PCT	W		L	PCT
No. 3 Arizona †	16	–	2	.889	36	–	3	.923
No. 7 Houston	14	–	4	.778	30	–	7	.811
No. 20 Kansas	12	–	6	.667	24	–	11	.686
No. 21 Texas Tech	12	–	6	.667	23	–	11	.676
No. 8 Iowa State	12	–	6	.667	29	–	8	.784
TCU	11	–	7	.611	23	–	12	.657
West Virginia	9	–	9	.500	21	–	14	.600
UCF	9	–	9	.500	21	–	12	.636
Cincinnati	9	–	9	.500	18	–	15	.545
BYU	9	–	9	.500	23	–	12	.657
Colorado	7	–	11	.389	17	–	16	.515
Arizona State	7	–	11	.389	17	–	16	.515
Baylor	6	–	12	.333	17	–	17	.500
Oklahoma State	6	–	12	.333	20	–	15	.571
Kansas State	3	–	15	.167	12	–	20	.375
Utah	2	–	16	.111	10	–	22	.313
† 2026 Big 12 tournament winner Rankings from AP poll

The 2025–26 UCF Knights men's basketball team represented the University of Central Florida during the 2025–26 NCAA Division I men's basketball season, marking their third season as members of the Big 12 Conference. The Knights, in the program's 57th season of basketball, were led by tenth-year head coach Johnny Dawkins and played their home games at the Addition Financial Arena.

== Previous season ==
The Knights finished the 2024–25 season 20–17, 7–13 in Big 12 Play to finish in a tie for 13th place. They defeated Utah in the first round of the Big 12 Tournament, 87−72. They lost in overtime of the second round to Kansas, 98–94.

The Knights were invited to play in the inaugural College Basketball Crown, a single-elimination, fully-bracketed men's college basketball postseason tournament featuring sixteen National Collegiate Athletic Association (NCAA) Division I teams not selected to participate in the NCAA Division I men's basketball tournament.

In their first round game, they defeated Oregon State, 76–75. They defeated fellow Big 12 Conference opponent Cincinnati in their quarterfinals game, 88–80, to reach the semifinals. In their semifinal matchup, the Knights defeated Villanova, 104–98 in overtime. In the championship game, they lost 77−66 to Nebraska.

== Preseason ==
The Big 12 preseason coaches poll was released on October 16, 2025. All awards were voted on by the league's 16 head coaches, who could not vote for their own team or players. The Big 12 preseason media poll was released on October 30, 2025.

Big 12 Preseason Coaches Poll

	Big 12 coaches	Points
1.	Houston	224 (12)
2.	BYU	204 (1)
3.	Texas Tech	200
4.	Arizona	179 (1)
5.	Iowa State	170
6.	Kansas	163
7.	Baylor	137
8.	Cincinnati	120
9.	Kansas State	117
10.	TCU	90
11.	West Virginia	79
12.	Oklahoma State	77
13.	Utah	50
14.	UCF	39
15.	Colorado	37
16.	Arizona State	34
Reference: (#) first-place votes

Big 12 Preseason Media Poll

	Big 12 media
1.	Houston
2.	Texas Tech
3.	BYU
4.	Arizona
5.	Iowa State
6.	Kansas
7.	Baylor
8.	Kansas State
9.	Cincinnati
10.	TCU
11.	West Virginia
12.	Oklahoma State
13.	Utah
14.	UCF
15.	Colorado
16.	Arizona State

== Roster ==
2025–26 UCF Knights men's basketball team
Players
Coaches

Pos.	#	Name	Height	Weight	Year	Previous school	Hometown
C	0	Jeremy Foumena	6 ft 11 in (2.11 m)	250 lb (113 kg)	RS Jr	Mississippi State	Montreal, Québec, Canada
G	1	Themus Fulks	6 ft 2 in (1.88 m)	185 lb (84 kg)	GS	Milwaukee	Winston-Salem, North Carolina
G	2	Riley Kugel	6 ft 5 in (1.96 m)	1210 lb (549 kg)	Sr	Mississippi State	Orlando, Florida
G	3	George Beale Jr.	6 ft 4 in (1.93 m)	200 lb (91 kg)	Sr	Hampton	Suffolk, Virginia
F	4	Jamichael Stillwell	6 ft 8 in (2.03 m)	245 lb (111 kg)	Sr	Milwaukee	Atlanta, Georgia
G	5	Kris Parker	6 ft 9 in (2.06 m)	200 lb (91 kg)	RS So	Villanova	Tallahassee, Florida
C	7	John Bol	7 ft 2 in (2.18 m)	210 lb (95 kg)	So	Ole Miss	Boma, South Sudan
C	9	Elijah Hulsewe	7 ft 0 in (2.13 m)	270 lb (122 kg)	RS Jr	Bethune–Cookman	Orlando, Florida
G	11	Carmelo Pacheco	6 ft 5 in (1.96 m)	190 lb (86 kg)	Jr	Mount St. Mary's	Harrisonburg, Virginia
G	22	Chris Johnson	6 ft 5 in (1.96 m)	195 lb (88 kg)	Jr	Stephen F. Austin	Houston, Texas
G	24	Zach Johnson	6 ft 6 in (1.98 m)	195 lb (88 kg)	Fr	IV Greatness Academy	Southern Pines, North Carolina
G	24	Tanner Jones	6 ft 4 in (1.93 m)	190 lb (86 kg)	Fr	IMG Academy (FL)	Memphis, Tennessee
G	33	Poohpha Warakulnukroh	5 ft 11 in (1.8 m)	177 lb (80 kg)	RS Sr	Montverde Academy	Bangkok, Thailand
F	35	Devan Cambridge	6 ft 6 in (1.98 m)	210 lb (95 kg)	GS	Texas Tech	Nashville, Tennessee
F	99	Jordan Burks	6 ft 9 in (2.06 m)	205 lb (93 kg)	Jr	Georgetown	Decatur, Alabama

Head coach

- Johnny Dawkins (Duke)

Assistant coach(es)

- Robbie Laing (Troy)
- Dwayne Anderson II (Villanova)
- Tyson Waterman (Winthrop)
- Adam Hood (Air Force)

Legend

- (C) Team captain
- (S) Suspended
- (I) Ineligible
- (W) Walk-on
- Injured
- Current redshirt

Roster
Last update: October 24, 2025

== Schedule and results ==
Date time, TV	Rank^{#}	Opponent^{#}	Result	Record	High points	High rebounds	High assists	Site (attendance) city, state
Exhibition
October 21, 2025*; 7:00 p.m., ESPN+		at No. 6 Duke; Brotherhood Run	L 71–96		22 – Kugel	7 – Kugel	4 – Fulks	Cameron Indoor Stadium (9,314); Durham, NC
October 26, 2025*; 12:00 p.m., ESPN+		LSU	L 68–75		21 – Kugel	7 – Stillwell	7 – Kugel	Addition Financial Arena (5,409); Orlando, FL
Non-conference regular season
November 3, 2025*; 8:00 p.m., ESPN+		Hofstra	W 82–78	1–0	19 – Kugel	7 – Burks	8 – Fulks	Addition Financial Arena (6,029); Orlando, FL
November 8, 2025*; 4:00 p.m., ESPN+		Vanderbilt	L 93–105	1–1	25 – Kugel	6 – Cambridge	4 – Fulks	Addition Financial Arena (6,018); Orlando, FL
November 11, 2025*; 7:00 p.m., ESPN+		Florida A&M	W 97–60	2–1	19 – Pacheco	7 – Burks	6 – Fulks	Addition Financial Arena (5,577); Orlando, FL
November 14, 2025*; 8:00 p.m., SECN+		at Texas A&M	W 86–74	3–1	21 – Burks	9 – Stillwell	9 – Fulks	Reed Arena (9,099); College Station, TX
November 17, 2025*; 7:00 p.m., ESPN+		Oakland	W 87–83	4–1	20 – Stillwell	13 – Stillwell	10 – Fulks	Addition Financial Arena (5,559); Orlando, FL
November 20, 2025*; 7:00 p.m., ESPN2		vs. Pittsburgh; Legends Classic	W 77–67	5–1	18 – Tied	18 – Stillwell	4 – Tied	Ocean Center (1,006); Daytona Beach, FL
November 25, 2025*; 7:00 p.m., ESPN+		Quinnipiac	W 102–91	6–1	18 – Foumena	7 – Tied	13 – Fulks	Addition Financial Arena (5,173); Orlando, FL
November 29, 2025*; 1:00 p.m., ESPN+		VMI	W 82–57	7–1	21 – Stillwell	14 – Stillwell	5 – Tied	Addition Financial Arena (4,905); Orlando, FL
December 7, 2025*; 4:00 p.m., ESPN+		Towson	W 86–61	8–1	20 – Fulks	6 – Stillwell	8 – Fulks	Addition Financial Arena (5,346); Orlando, FL
December 17, 2025*; 7:00 p.m., ESPN+		Mercer	W 81–63	9–1	17 – Burks	10 – Stillwell	3 – Tied	Addition Financial Arena (5,195); Orlando, FL
December 20, 2025*; 5:00 p.m., ESPN+		Florida Gulf Coast	W 102–80	10–1	23 – Burks	13 – Stillwell	5 – Fulks	Addition Financial Arena (5,481); Orlando, FL
December 23, 2025*; 2:00 p.m., ESPN+		vs. Florida Atlantic	W 85–80	11–1	24 – Fulks	11 – Bol	12 – Fulks	ESPN Wide World of Sports Complex (1,057); Lake Buena Vista, FL
Big 12 regular season
January 3, 2026; 2:00 p.m., Peacock		No. 17 Kansas	W 81–75	12–1 (1–0)	19 – Kugel	8 – Cambridge	3 – Fulks	Addition Financial Arena (8,808); Orlando, FL
January 6, 2026; 8:00 p.m., ESPN+	No. 25	at Oklahoma State	L 76–87	12–2 (1–1)	15 – Kugel	11 – Cambridge	4 – Tied	Gallagher-Iba Arena (5,057); Stillwater, OK
January 11, 2026; 5:00 p.m., ESPN2	No. 25	Cincinnati	W 73–72	13–2 (2–1)	19 – Kugel	8 – Foumena	12 – Fulks	Addition Financial Arena (7,899); Orlando, FL
January 14, 2026; 8:00 p.m., Peacock		at Kansas State	W 81–73	14–2 (3–1)	19 – Kugel	19 – Tied	12 – Fulks	Bramlage Coliseum (7,033); Manhattan, KS
January 17, 2026; 4:00 p.m., ESPN		No. 1 Arizona	L 77–84	14–3 (3–2)	30 – Fulks	6 – Tied	8 – Fulks	Addition Financial Arena (10,000); Orlando, FL
January 20, 2026; 8:00 p.m., CBSSN		at No. 9 Iowa State	L 57–87	14–4 (3–3)	15 – Tied	7 – Burks	5 – Fulks	Hilton Coliseum (14,267); Ames, IA
January 24, 2026; 3:00 p.m., ESPN+		at Colorado	W 95–86	15–4 (4–3)	22 – Kugel	10 – Bol	8 – Fulks	CU Events Center (6,528); Boulder, CO
January 27, 2026; 4:00 p.m., ESPN+		Arizona State	W 79–76	16–4 (5–3)	17 – Kugel	10 – Bol	6 – Fulks	Addition Financial Arena (6,621); Orlando, FL
January 31, 2026; 12:00 p.m., ESPN2		No. 11 Texas Tech	W 88–79	17–4 (6–3)	21 – Fulks	10 – Tied	7 – Fulks	Addition Financial Arena (8,511); Orlando, FL
February 4, 2026; 7:00 p.m., FS1		at No. 8 Houston	L 55–79	17–5 (6–4)	9 – Kugel	7 – Bol	6 – Stillwell	Fertitta Center (7,035); Houston, TX
February 8, 2026; 2:00 p.m., CBSSN		at Cincinnati	L 72–92	17–6 (6–5)	16 – Johnson	9 – Stillwell	6 – Johnson	Fifth Third Arena (9,969); Cincinnati, OH
February 14, 2026; 6:00 p.m., FS1		West Virginia	L 67–74	17–7 (6–6)	19 – Fulks	8 – Burks	7 – Folks	Addition Financial Arena (8,081); Orlando, FL
February 17, 2026; 7:00 p.m., ESPN+		TCU	W 82–71	18–7 (7–6)	23 – Burks	7 – Burks	6 – Fulks	Addition Financial Arena (6,990); Orlando, FL
February 21, 2026; 9:00 p.m., ESPN+		at Utah	W 73–71	19–7 (8–6)	24 – Fulks	6 – Bol	5 – Johnson	Jon M. Huntsman Center (7,686); Salt Lake City, UT
February 24, 2026; 11:00 p.m., ESPN2		at No. 19 BYU	W 97–84	20–7 (9–6)	24 – Tied	12 – Stillwell	11 – Fulks	Marriott Center (18,062); Provo, UT
February 28, 2026; 7:00 p.m., FS1		Baylor	L 86–87	20–8 (9–7)	26 – Kugel	7 – Bol	10 – Fulks	Addition Financial Arena (8,735); Orlando, FL
March 3, 2026; 7:00 p.m., ESPN+		Oklahoma State	L 104–111 ^{OT}	20–9 (9–8)	22 – Fulks	9 – Tied	6 – Fulks	Addition Financial Arena (8,011); Orlando, FL
March 6, 2026; 8:00 p.m., CBSSN		at West Virginia	L 62–77	20–10 (9–9)	16 – Tied	9 – Burks	4 – Fulks	WVU Coliseum (11,312); Morgantown, WV
Big 12 tournament
March 11, 2026; 3:00 p.m., ESPNU	(8)	vs. (9) Cincinnati; Second round	W 66–65 ^{OT}	21–10	18 – Stillwell	16 – Stillwell	7 – Fulks	T-Mobile Center (12,477); Kansas City, MO
March 11, 2026; 3:00 p.m., ESPN	(8)	vs. (1) No. 2 Arizona; Quarterfinal	L 57–78	21–11	14 – Fulks	11 – Stillwell	5 – Stilwell	T-Mobile Center (14,745); Kansas City, MO
NCAA Tournament
March 20, 2026; 7:25 p.m., TBS	(10 E)	vs. (7 E) UCLA; First round	L 71–75	21–12	22 – Burks	13 – Stillwell	8 – Fulks	Xfinity Mobile Arena (19,636); Philadelphia, PA
*Non-conference game. ^{#}Rankings from AP poll. (#) Tournament seedings in parentheses. E=East. All times are in Eastern Time.

== Rankings ==
Ranking movements Legend: ██ Increase in ranking ██ Decrease in ranking — = Not ranked RV = Received votes
	Week																				
Poll	Pre	1	2	3	4	5	6	7	8	9	10	11	12	13	14	15	16	17	18	19	Final
AP	—	—	—	—	—	—	—	RV	RV*	25	RV	RV	—	RV	—	—	RV	RV	—	—	—
Coaches	—	—	—	—	—	—	—	—	—	RV	RV	RV	—	RV	—	—	—	RV	—	—	RV

*AP did not release a week 8 poll.
