= Koa Peat =

American basketball player (born 2007)

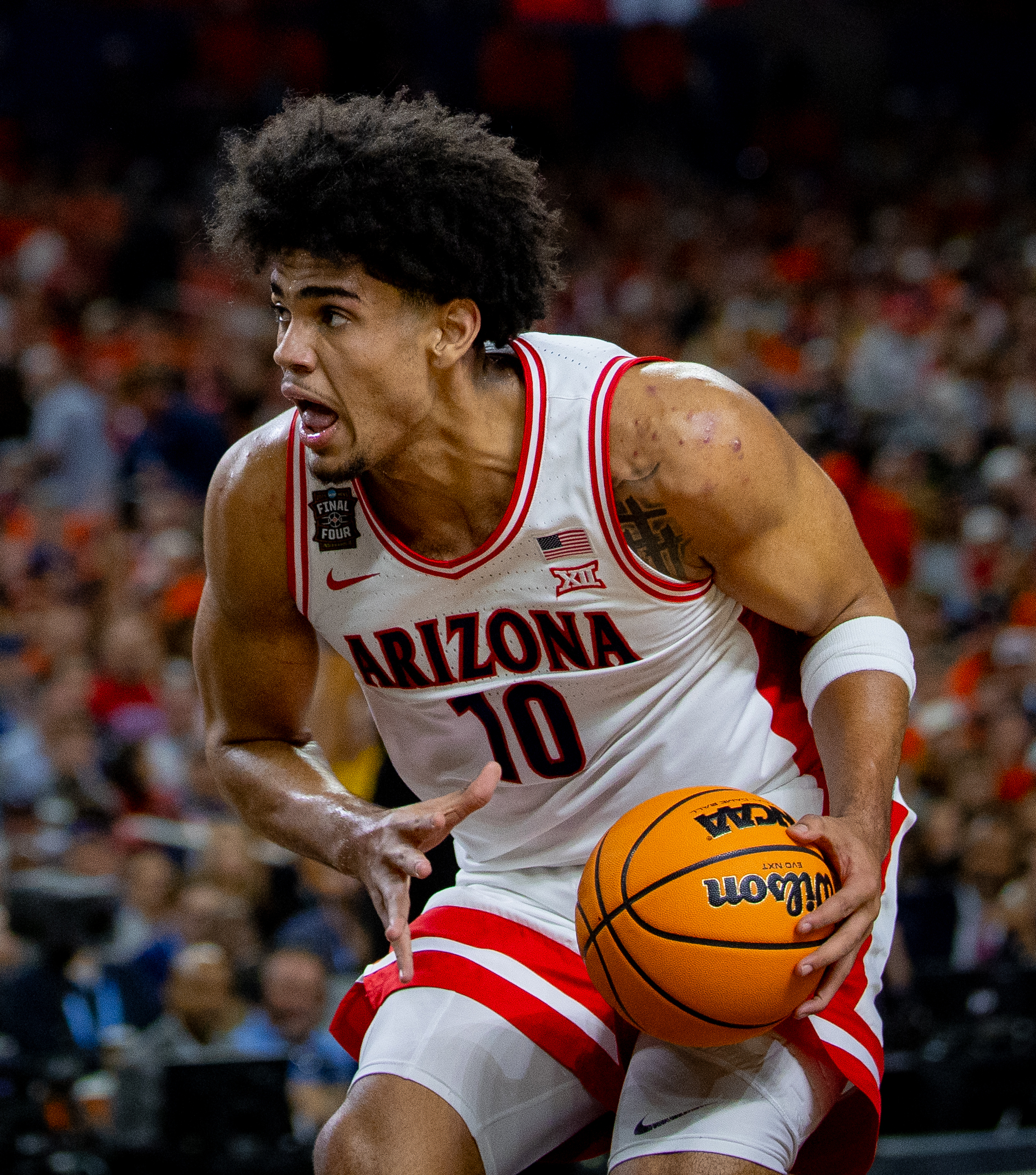
- Peat in 2026

No. 18 – Phoenix Suns
- Position: Power forward
- League: NBA

Personal information
- Born: January 20, 2007 (age 19) Gilbert, Arizona, U.S.
- Listed height: 6 ft 8 in (2.03 m)
- Listed weight: 235 lb (107 kg)

Career information
- High school: Perry (Gilbert, Arizona)
- College: Arizona (2025–2026)
- NBA draft: 2026: 1st round, 30th overall pick
- Drafted by: Dallas Mavericks
- Playing career: 2026–present

Career history
- 2026–present: Phoenix Suns

Career highlights
- Third-team All-Big 12 (2026); Big 12 All-Freshman Team (2026); McDonald's All-American (2025); Nike Hoop Summit (2025); USA Basketball Male Athlete of the Year (2023)
- Stats at NBA.com
- Stats at Basketball Reference
Medals
Men's basketball
Representing United States
FIBA U19 World Cup
Gold medal – first place	2025 Switzerland	Team
FIBA U17 World Cup
Gold medal – first place	2024 Turkey	Team
Gold medal – first place	2022 Spain	Team
FIBA Under-16 Americas Championship
Gold medal – first place	2023 Mérida	Team

Koa Seward Peat (born January 20, 2007) is a professional American basketball player for the Phoenix Suns of the National Basketball Association (NBA). He played college basketball for the Arizona Wildcats. A consensus five-star recruit, he was one of the top-ranked players of the 2025 class.

== High school career ==
Peat attended Perry High School in Gilbert, Arizona. He joined the varsity basketball team in June 2021. His head coach, Sam Duane Jr., had previously coached two of his older brothers to state titles at Corona del Sol High School in nearby Tempe. As a freshman at Perry, Peat averaged 15 points, 6.1 rebounds, 1.6 assists and 1.8 blocks per game and teamed with Cody Williams to guide the Pumas to their first-ever Class 6A state championship. He recorded 14 points, six rebounds and two blocks in the 48–38 title game victory over Hamilton.

As a sophomore, Peat averaged 19.7 points, 9.4 rebounds, 3.0 assists, 1.7 blocks and 1.3 steals per game on 70 percent shooting while leading the Pumas to a 30–1 record and the inaugural AIA Open Division state title. In the championship game, he recorded a game-high 35 points, six rebounds and four blocks on 13-of-18 shooting in their 74–58 win over Sunnyslope. Peat was named the Arizona Gatorade Player of the Year and the MaxPreps Arizona Player of the Year.

As a junior, Peat averaged 20.5 points, 10.6 rebounds, 3.4 assists, 2.2 blocks and 1.0 steals per game, leading Perry to a 25–6 record and another AIA Open Division state title, (Note: Gatorade incorrectly reports Perry's record as 24–6.) as well as their third-straight state crown overall. In the championship game, he posted 21 points, 13 rebounds and four assists to help the Pumas overcome a 17-point deficit in an eventual 71–67 win over Millennium. Peat repeated as the Arizona Gatorade Player of the Year and the MaxPreps Arizona Player of the Year.

As a senior, Peat averaged 18.7 points, 10.3 rebounds, 5.1 assists, 1.6 blocks and 1.0 steals per game, leading Perry to a 27–2 record, (Note: Gatorade incorrectly reports Perry's record as 26–2.) a third straight AIA Open Division state title, and a fourth straight state title overall. Despite suffering a broken right hand in practice two days before the state quarterfinals, he returned for the semifinals, where he scored 16 points in a 76–57 win over Sandra Day O'Connor, before recording 20 points, nine rebounds and two blocks in a 63–44 win over Sunnyslope in the championship game. Peat was named the Arizona Gatorade Player of the Year and the MaxPreps Arizona Player of the Year for the third year in a row. He was selected to both the McDonald's All-American Game and the Nike Hoop Summit, but was unable to play in either due to undergoing surgery for his broken hand.

=== Recruiting ===
Peat was a consensus five-star recruit and one of the top players in the 2025 class, according to major recruiting services. He received his first scholarship offer from NCAA Division I program Arizona State as an eighth grader and a second from USC before starting high school.

On March 27, 2025, Peat announced his commitment to play college basketball at the University of Arizona during a live appearance on The Pat McAfee Show on ESPN. His top five schools also included Arizona State, Baylor, Houston and Texas. Peat officially signed his National Letter of Intent on April 16.

College recruiting
Name	Hometown	School	Height	Weight	Commit date
Koa Peat; PF	Gilbert, AZ	Perry	6 ft 8 in (2.03 m)	215 lb (98 kg)	Mar 27, 2025
Koa Peat; PF	Recruit ratings: Rivals: 247Sports: ESPN: (96)				
Overall recruit ranking: Rivals: 3 247Sports: 3 ESPN: 3
Note: In many cases, Scout, Rivals, 247Sports, On3, and ESPN may conflict in their listings of height and weight.; In these cases, the average was taken. ESPN grades are on a 100-point scale.; Sources: "2025 Team Ranking". Rivals.

== College career ==
Peat made his collegiate debut on November 3, 2025, leading all scorers with 30 points along with seven rebounds, five assists, three steals and a block in a nationally televised 93–87 upset win over No. 3 Florida, the defending national champions. He led Arizona to both the Big 12 regular-season championship and tournament championship, which earned his team a 1-seed for the NCAA tournament. He scored 20 points in the Elite Eight against Purdue to help send the team to the Final Four for the first time in 25 years. Following the end of the season, Peat, alongside his teammates Brayden Burries and Jaden Bradley, entered the 2026 NBA draft on April 24, 2026.

== Professional career ==
On June 23, 2026, Peat was selected by the Dallas Mavericks with the 30th overall pick in the 2026 NBA draft, but was subsequently traded to the New York Knicks and then to the Phoenix Suns in exchange for Sergio de Larrea.

== National team career ==
Peat won a gold medal with the United States national under-17 team at the 2022 FIBA Under-17 World Cup in Spain, earning all-tournament team honors after averaging 9.6 points, 4.3 rebounds and 1.4 assists per game. He helped the team to another gold at the 2023 FIBA Under-16 Americas Championship in Mexico after averaging a team-high 17.2 points to go with 8.3 rebounds and 3.2 assists per game—which included a 29-point, 14-rebound performance against Puerto Rico in the semifinal—and was named the 2023 USA Basketball Male Athlete of the Year. Peat became the first player to win multiple gold medals at the FIBA Under-17 World Cup when he helped the U.S. to another first-place finish at the 2024 edition in Turkey. He averaged 17.9 points, 5.6 rebounds and 2.1 assists per game and scored 26 points in their 129–88 win over Italy in the final.

Peat helped the United States national under-19 team to a gold medal at the 2025 FIBA Under-19 World Cup in Switzerland, where he averaged 12.6 points 6.9 rebounds and 1.1 assists per game. He became the first player in USA Basketball history to win four men's international gold medals at the junior level, as well as the first player in men's basketball history to win three junior World Cup gold medals.

== Personal life ==
Peat was born in Gilbert, Arizona. He is the youngest of seven children of former National Football League (NFL) offensive guard Todd Peat, who played nine seasons with the St. Louis/Phoenix Cardinals and Los Angeles Raiders, and Jana Peat, who played basketball, volleyball and softball in high school. His oldest brother, Todd Jr., played college football at Nebraska, Eastern Arizona and Texas A&M–Commerce. Another older brother, Andrus, played in the NFL for the New Orleans Saints, Las Vegas Raiders, and Pittsburgh Steelers. Another older brother, Cassius, played college football for Michigan State, Eastern Arizona, Pima CC, Scottsdale CC and Virginia. His brother Keona also plays football for the University of Arizona. His sister Leilani played women's college basketball for Seattle and San Francisco and his sister Maya played the same sport for Arkansas–Pine Bluff and Texas Tech University.

Peat is of Native Hawaiian descent through his mother, and his first name means "strong warrior" in the Hawaiian language. While in high school, he volunteered on the Gila River Indian Community, as well as a youth basketball and football coach.

== Career statistics ==
Legend
GP	Games played	GS	Games started	MPG	Minutes per game
FG%	Field goal percentage	3P%	3-point field goal percentage	FT%	Free throw percentage
RPG	Rebounds per game	APG	Assists per game	SPG	Steals per game
BPG	Blocks per game	PPG	Points per game	**Bold**	Career high

=== College ===
College statistics
Year	Team	GP	GS	MPG	FG%	3P%	FT%	RPG	APG	SPG	BPG	PPG
2025–26	Arizona	36	36	27.8	.528	.350	.623	5.6	2.6	.6	.7	14.1
