= Cameron Carr =

Cameron Carr may refer to:

- Cameron Carr (actor) (1876–1944), British actor of the silent era
- Cameron Carr (basketball) (born 2004), American basketball player
- Cameron Carr (wheelchair rugby) (born 1977), Australian Paralympic wheelchair rugby player
