= Milan Momcilovic =

Serbian-American basketball player (born 2004)

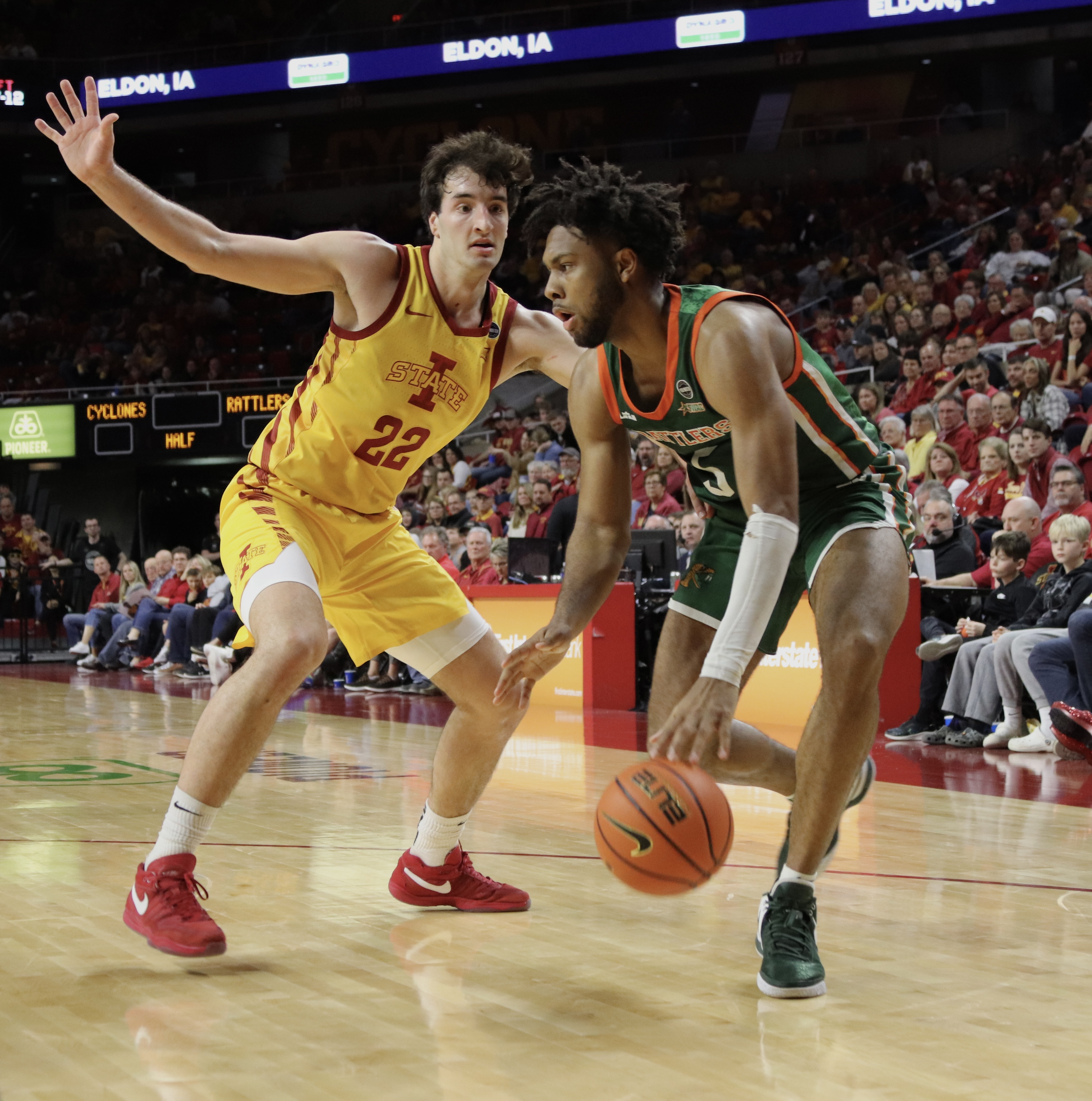
- Momcilovic in 2023

No. 22 – Kentucky Wildcats
- Position: Power forward / small forward
- Conference: Southeastern Conference

Personal information
- Born: September 22, 2004 (age 22)
- Listed height: 6 ft 9 in (2.06 m)
- Listed weight: 220 lb (100 kg)

Career information
- High school: Pewaukee (Pewaukee, Wisconsin)
- College: Iowa State (2023–2026); Kentucky (2026–present)

Career highlights
- Second-team All-Big 12 (2026); Big 12 All-Freshman team (2024); Co-Wisconsin Mr. Basketball (2023)

Milan Momcilovic (born September 22, 2004) is an American college basketball player for the Kentucky Wildcats of the Southeastern Conference (SEC). He previously played for the Iowa State Cyclones.

== Early life and high school ==
Momcilovic grew up in Pewaukee, Wisconsin, and attended Pewaukee High School. He is of Serbian descent. Momcilovic averaged 16.7 points, 7.1 rebounds, and 2.5 assists and won the WIAA Division 2 state championship as a sophomore. Momcilovic averaged 18.1 points and 7.7 rebounds during his junior season. He was named Wisconsin Mr. Basketball after averaging 23.4 points and 10 rebounds per game during his senior season. He was rated a four-star recruit and committed to play college basketball at Iowa State over offers from Virginia, UCLA, Michigan State, Louisville, Minnesota, Creighton, and Texas.

== College career ==
Momcilovic entered his freshman season at Iowa State as the Cyclones' starting power forward. In 2026 as a junior, he currently leads the NCAA in 3 point percentage. In a game against Utah during the 2025-26 season, Momcilovic set the Iowa State single-season three-point record, previously set by Dedric Willoughby. Milan announced he was going to declare for the draft during the Big 12 tournament. On April 12, 2026, Momocilovic announced that he will enter the 2026 NBA draft while entering his name in the transfer portal. On May 27, 2026, Momcilovic withdrew his name from the NBA draft. After withdrawing, Momcilovic announced he would be transferring to Kentucky four days later.

== Personal life ==
Momcilovic is the son of Nick and Zorica Momcilovic. He has a brother, Luka, and a sister, Maya. He is of Serbian descent.
