= Tounde Yessoufou =

Beninese basketball player (born 2006)

No. 24 – St. John's Red Storm
- Position: Small forward / shooting guard
- Conference: Big East Conference

Personal information
- Born: May 15, 2006 (age 20) Cotonou, Benin
- Listed height: 6 ft 5 in (1.96 m)
- Listed weight: 220 lb (100 kg)

Career information
- High school: St. Joseph (Santa Maria, California)
- College: Baylor (2025–2026); St. John's (2026–present)

Career highlights
- McDonald's All-American (2025); Nike Hoop Summit (2025)

Tounde Yessoufou (born May 15, 2006) is a Beninese college basketball player for the St. John's Red Storm of the Big East Conference. He previously played for the Baylor Bears.

== Early life ==
Yessoufou was born in Cotonou, Benin, and grew up playing soccer. He was pushed to start playing basketball by a local coach when he was aged 9. Yessoufou was inspired by watching Kobe Bryant and made the decision to pursue basketball.

== High school career ==
=== Freshman season ===
In 2021, Yessoufou moved to the United States just prior to starting his freshman year to play basketball at St. Joseph High School in Santa Maria, California, and stayed with a host family. He arrived at the school because his friend and fellow Benin native, Candace Kpetikou, played for the St. Joseph girls' basketball team. Yessoufou spent his first week in the United States in a hospital after he arrived with malaria and almost lost his life.

In his high school debut against Pioneer Valley, Yessoufou scored 20 points before ending the game on a backboard-breaking third-quarter dunk. In January 2022, he helped St. Joseph win the Alaska Airlines Classic and earned tournament MVP honors. He recorded 21 points, eight rebounds, and three blocks in the title game victory over East Anchorage, snapping their 35-game winning streak. As a freshman, Yessoufou averaged 26.4 points, 12.3 rebounds, 2.9 blocks, and 2.1 steals per game while shooting 61 percent from the floor, leading St. Joseph to a 27–4 record and an appearance in the CIF Central Section Open Division title game. He was named the Mountain League MVP and the Santa Maria Times All-Area MVP.

Yessoufou played for Team WhyNot in the offseason, including in the Peach Jam U15 tournament. He was named the most outstanding player (MOP) at the Pangos All-West Frosh/Soph Camp, as well as his team's MOP in the camp's Top 30 Cream of the Crop All-Star Game where he recorded 28 points and nine rebounds.

=== Sophomore season ===
As a sophomore in 2022–23, Yessoufou averaged 27.8 points, 10.7 rebounds, 2.9 assists, 1.3 blocks, and 3.7 steals per game, leading the school to a 28–7 record and the No. 9 ranking in the state. His rebounds and blocks were down due to the surge of senior center Caedin Hamilton. Yessoufou led the Knights to the CIF Central Section Division I title, scoring 16 points in the championship game victory over Clovis West.

Yessoufou contributed 29 points, 15 rebounds, four assists, and three steals in the CIF NorCal Open Division semifinals; St. Joseph defeated Dougherty Valley 87–76. He then recorded a game-high 27 points, 10 rebounds, and three blocks in their 72–58 win over Modesto Christian to win the NorCal Open Division Regional championship. Yessoufou fell just short of leading St. Joseph to a state title, as he was limited to 14 points in the 76–65 defeat to Harvard-Westlake in the Open Division state championship game.

Yessoufou repeated as the Mountain League MVP and the Santa Maria Times All-Area MVP and was named the CalHiSports State Sophomore of the Year. He was also named to the MaxPreps all-state third-team. In the offseason, Yessoufou again played for Team WhyNot, playing up a grade on the 17U Nike Elite Youth Basketball League (EYBL) circuit.

=== Recruiting ===
Yessoufou was a consensus top 20 recruit and one of the top players in the 2025 class, according to major recruiting services. He was rated a five-star recruit by Rivals and ESPN, as well as a four-star recruit by 247Sports.

College recruiting
Name	Hometown	School	Height	Weight	Commit date
Tounde Yessoufou; SF	Santa Maria, CA	St. Joseph (CA)	6 ft 6 in (1.98 m)	210 lb (95 kg)	
Tounde Yessoufou; SF	Recruit ratings: Rivals: 247Sports: ESPN: (91)				
Overall recruit ranking: Rivals: 14th 247Sports: 15th ESPN: 16th
Note: In many cases, Scout, Rivals, 247Sports, On3, and ESPN may conflict in their listings of height and weight.; In these cases, the average was taken. ESPN grades are on a 100-point scale.; Sources: "2025 Team Ranking". Rivals.

== College career ==
As a freshman, Yessoufou averaged 17.8 points, 5.9 rebounds and two steals per game. He set a Baylor freshman record with 605 points and was named All-Big 12 Honorable Mention. Yessoufou declared for the 2026 NBA draft at the conclusion of the season while entering the NCAA transfer portal. On May 28, 2026 Yessoufou removed his name from the draft and declared to play for Rick Pitino’s Red Storm at St. John’s University.

== Personal life ==
Yessoufou is a Christian.
