= Brayden Burries =

American basketball player (born 2005)

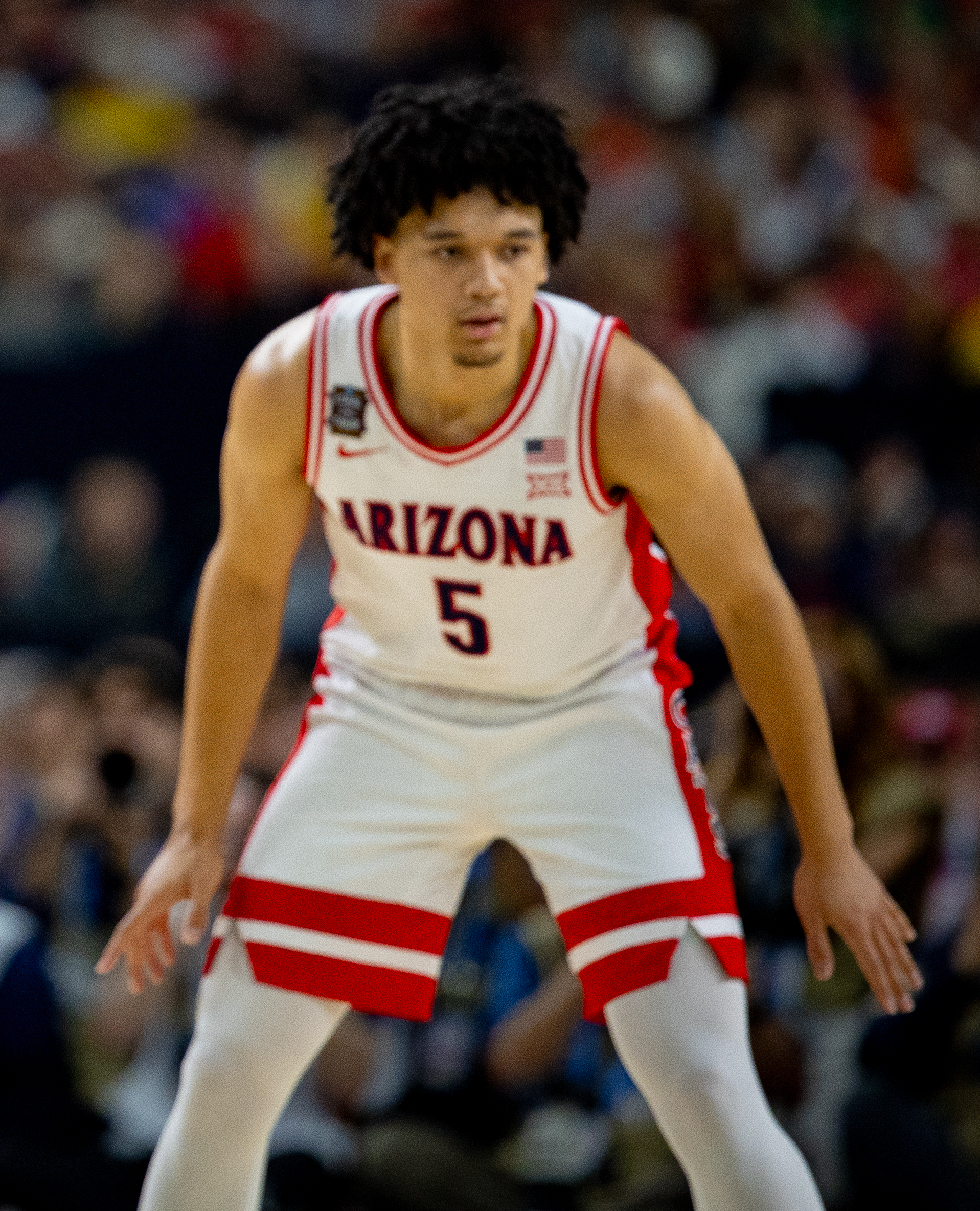
- Burries playing for Arizona in 2026

No. 0 – Milwaukee Bucks
- Position: Shooting guard / point guard
- League: NBA

Personal information
- Born: September 18, 2005 (age 21) San Bernardino, California, U.S.
- Listed height: 6 ft 4 in (1.93 m)
- Listed weight: 205 lb (93 kg)

Career information
- High school: Riverside Polytechnic (Riverside, California); Eleanor Roosevelt (Eastvale, California)
- College: Arizona (2025–2026)
- NBA draft: 2026: 1st round, 10th overall pick
- Drafted by: Milwaukee Bucks
- Playing career: 2026–present

Career history
- 2026–present: Milwaukee Bucks

Career highlights
- First-team All-Big 12 (2026); Big 12 All-Freshman Team (2026); McDonald's All-American (2025); California Mr. Basketball (2025)
- Stats at NBA.com
- Stats at Basketball Reference

Brayden Burries (born September 18, 2005) is an American basketball player for the Milwaukee Bucks of the National Basketball Association (NBA). A 6 ft 4 in (1.93 m) guard, he played college basketball for the Arizona Wildcats.

== Early life and high school ==
Burries grew up in San Bernardino, California and initially attended Riverside Polytechnic High School. He transferred to Eleanor Roosevelt High School after his freshman season. Burries was ineligible to play his sophomore season following the transfer. He averaged 24.8 points, 7.9 rebounds, 3.5 assists and 2.7 steals per game as a junior. He was selected to play in the 2025 McDonald's All-American Boys Game during his senior year.

Burries was a consensus five-star recruit and one of the top players in the 2025 class, according to major recruiting services. Burries accepted an athletic scholarship from the Arizona Wildcats.

== College career ==
Burries scored 32 points in the regular-season finale against Colorado. He was named to the All-Big 12 First Team and Big 12 All-Freshman team, and was a finalist for the Jerry West Award. Burries averaged 16.1 points, 4.9 rebounds, 2.4 assists and 1.5 steals per game as a freshman. Following the end of the season, Burries opted to enter the 2026 NBA draft on April 24, 2026, making him the second player from Arizona to enter the draft following Koa Peat.

== Professional career ==
On June 23, 2026, Burries was selected with the tenth overall pick by the Milwaukee Bucks in the 2026 NBA draft. On July 5, he signed his rookie scale contract with the Bucks.

On October 21, Burries made his Bucks debut, putting up 12 points and five rebounds in a 128–116 loss to the Washington Wizards.

On November 21, Burries scored a career-high 26 points off the bench in a 129-132 loss to the Philadelphia 76ers.

== Personal life ==
Burries is a Christian. Burries's father, Bobby, played college basketball at San Bernardino Valley College and Cal State San Bernardino, where he is a member of the school's athletic hall of fame. His mother, Hannah, played college softball at Tennessee and basketball at Cal State San Bernardino for one year as a graduate transfer.
