= Jaden Bradley =

American basketball player (born 2003)

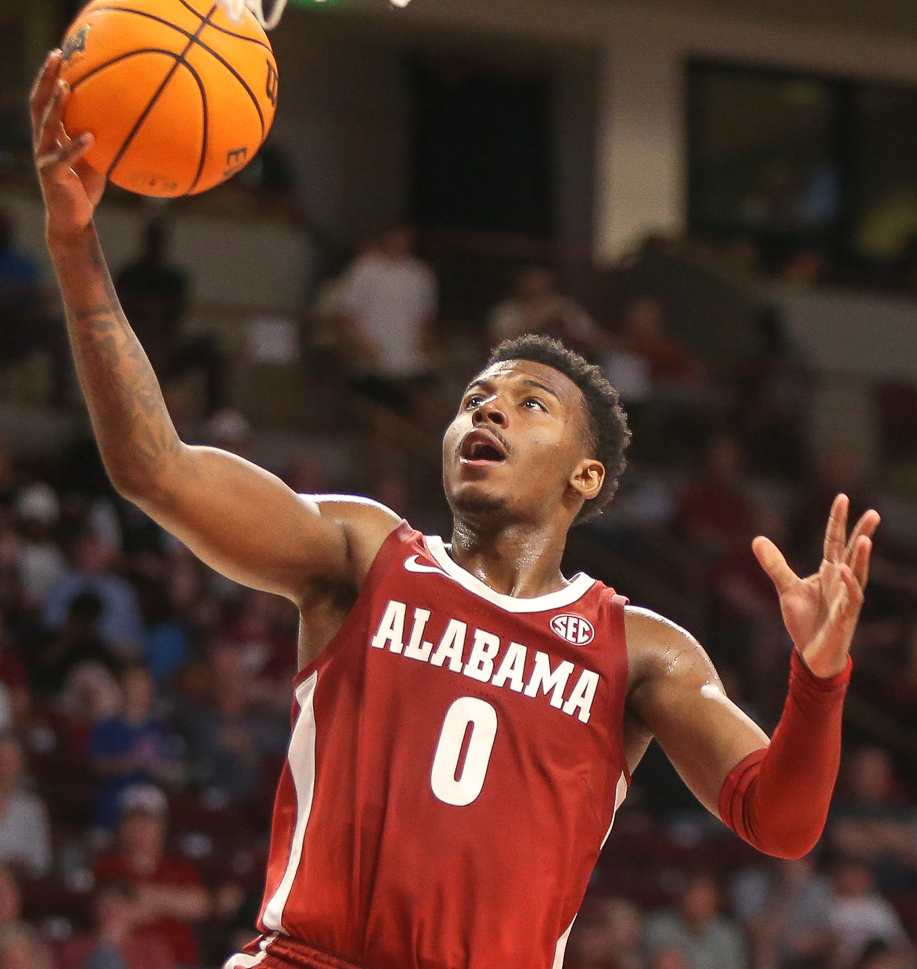
- Bradley with Alabama in 2023

No. 8 – Toronto Raptors
- Position: Point guard
- League: NBA

Personal information
- Born: September 14, 2003 (age 23) Rochester, New York, U.S.
- Listed height: 6 ft 3 in (1.91 m)
- Listed weight: 200 lb (91 kg)

Career information
- High school: Cannon School (Concord, North Carolina); IMG Academy (Bradenton, Florida)
- College: Alabama (2022–2023); Arizona (2023–2026)
- NBA draft: 2026: 2nd round, 50th overall pick
- Drafted by: Toronto Raptors
- Playing career: 2026–present

Career history
- 2026–present: Toronto Raptors

Career highlights
- Third-team All-American – NABC, TSN, USBWA (2026); Big 12 Player of the Year (2026); First-team All-Big 12 (2026); Big 12 All-Defensive Team (2026); Big 12 tournament MVP (2026); SEC All-Freshman Team (2023); McDonald's All-American (2022)
- Stats at NBA.com
- Stats at Basketball Reference

Jaden Shawn Bradley (born September 14, 2003) is an American basketball player for the Toronto Raptors of the National Basketball Association (NBA). He played college basketball for the Alabama Crimson Tide and Arizona Wildcats, and was drafted in the second round of the 2026 NBA draft.

== Early life ==
Bradley originally grew up in Rochester, New York. His family moved to Charlotte, North Carolina while he was in elementary school and attended the Cannon School in Concord, North Carolina. Bradley was named the 2020 North Carolina Gatorade Player of the Year after averaging 23.1 points, 6.4 rebounds, 6.1 assists, and 2.9 steals per game. He transferred to IMG Academy in Bradenton, Florida before the start of his junior year. Bradley averaged 11.4 points and led the team with 4.6 assists and two steals per game in his only season at IMG. He was selected to play in the 2022 McDonald's All-American Boys Game at the end of the season but couldn't due to injury.

=== Recruiting ===
Bradley was considered a five-star recruit by ESPN, and a four-star recruit by 247Sports and Rivals. On September 30, 2021, he committed to playing college basketball for Alabama after considering an offer from Arizona while listing Gonzaga, Kentucky, and Florida State as finalists.

College recruiting
| Name | Hometown | School | Height | Weight | Commit date |
|---|---|---|---|---|---|
| Jaden Bradley; PG | Rochester, NY | IMG Academy (FL) | 6 ft 3 in (1.91 m) | 185 lb (84 kg) | Sep 30, 2021 |
| Jaden Bradley; PG | Recruit ratings: Rivals: 247Sports: ESPN: (90) | | | | |
Overall recruit ranking: Rivals: 32 247Sports: 27 ESPN: 20
Note: In many cases, Scout, Rivals, 247Sports, On3, and ESPN may conflict in their listings of height and weight.; In these cases, the average was taken. ESPN grades are on a 100-point scale.; Sources: "Alabama 2022 Basketball Commitments". Rivals.; "2022 Alabama Crimson Tide Recruiting Class". ESPN.; "2022 Team Ranking". Rivals.

== College career ==
Bradley entered his freshman season at Alabama as the Crimson Tide's second-string point guard. He became a starter in December after starting guard Nimari Burnett suffered a wrist injury. On April 4, 2023, Bradley entered the transfer portal. On May 3, 2023, he committed to Arizona.

== Professional career ==
On June 24, 2026, Bradley was selected by the Toronto Raptors with the 50th overall pick in the 2026 NBA draft. He was later signed to a two-way contract with the Raptors. On September 21, the Raptors converted Bradley's two-way contract into a standard NBA contract.

== Career statistics ==
Legend
| GP | Games played | GS | Games started | MPG | Minutes per game |
| FG% | Field goal percentage | 3P% | 3-point field goal percentage | FT% | Free throw percentage |
| RPG | Rebounds per game | APG | Assists per game | SPG | Steals per game |
| BPG | Blocks per game | PPG | Points per game | **Bold** | Career high |

=== College ===
| Year | Team | GP | GS | MPG | FG% | 3P% | FT% | RPG | APG | SPG | BPG | PPG |
|---|---|---|---|---|---|---|---|---|---|---|---|---|
| 2022–23 | Alabama | 37 | 22 | 19.8 | .392 | .318 | .695 | 2.6 | 3.1 | .5 | .1 | 6.4 |
| 2023–24 | Arizona | 36 | 0 | 20.1 | .462 | **.464** | .825 | 2.4 | 2.0 | 1.0 | **.2** | 7.0 |
| 2024–25 | Arizona | 37 | 37 | **34.1** | **.467** | .321 | **.827** | **3.4** | 3.7 | **1.8** | .1 | 12.1 |
| 2025–26 | Arizona | **39** | **39** | 30.6 | .463 | .394 | .809 | **3.4** | **4.4** | 1.4 | .1 | **13.3** |
| Career | | 149 | 98 | 26.3 | .452 | .366 | .789 | 2.9 | 3.3 | 1.2 | .1 | 9.7 |
