= Joshua Jefferson =

American basketball player (born 2003)

No. 9 – Brooklyn Nets
- Position: Power forward / small forward
- League: NBA

Personal information
- Born: November 21, 2003 (age 22) Las Vegas, Nevada, U.S.
- Listed height: 6 ft 8 in (2.03 m)
- Listed weight: 250 lb (113 kg)

Career information
- High school: Liberty (Henderson, Nevada)
- College: Saint Mary's (2022–2024); Iowa State (2024–2026)
- NBA draft: 2026: 1st round, 28th overall pick
- Drafted by: Minnesota Timberwolves
- Playing career: 2026–present

Career history
- 2026–present: Brooklyn Nets
- 2026: →Long Island Nets

Career highlights
- Consensus second-team All-American (2026); First-team All-Big 12 (2026)
- Stats at NBA.com
- Stats at Basketball Reference

Joshua Jefferson (born November 21, 2003) is an American professional basketball player for the Brooklyn Nets of the National Basketball Association (NBA). He played college basketball for the Saint Mary's Gaels and Iowa State Cyclones.

== Early life and high school ==
Jefferson attended Liberty High School in Henderson, Nevada. As a senior, he averaged 17.7 points, ten rebounds, four assists, and two steals per game and helped lead his team to a Class 5A state championship. Jefferson committed to play college basketball for the Saint Mary's Gaels.

== College career ==
=== Saint Mary's ===
As a freshman in 2022–23, Jefferson averaged 2.2 points and 1.4 rebounds per game. In 2023-24, he averaged 10.2 points, 6.5 rebounds, and 2.3 assists per game. After the season, Jefferson entered the NCAA transfer portal.

=== Iowa State ===
Jefferson transferred to play for the Iowa State Cyclones. In the first round of the 2025 NCAA Division I men's basketball tournament, he tallied ten points, eight rebounds, eight assists, three steals, and two blocks in a victory against Lipscomb. He finished the 2024–25 season averaging 13 points, 7.4 rebounds, 3.1 assists, and 2.1 steals per game. Jefferson decided to return to the Cyclones for the 2025-26 season. On December 11, 2025, he recorded 24 points in a comeback win over rival Iowa. On January 2, 2026, Jefferson notched ten points, ten rebounds, and ten assists in a victory over West Virginia. On January 20th, 2026, Jefferson had 17 points, 12 assists, and 10 rebounds. He faced a left ankle sprain against Tennessee State in the 2026 NCAA tournament.

== Professional career ==
=== Brooklyn Nets (2026–present) ===
On June 23, 2026, Jefferson was selected with the 28th overall pick by the Minnesota Timberwolves in the 2026 NBA draft; He was then subsequently traded to the Brooklyn Nets in exchange for pick 33 (Isaiah Evans). On October 16, 2026, Jefferson was assigned to the Long Island Nets of the NBA G League alongside Ben Saraf and Drake Powell. On October 25, 2026, Jefferson made his NBA debut, where he logged in four minutes of action in a 109-136 loss against the Indiana Pacers.
