= Flory Bidunga =

Congolese basketball player

No. 40 – Louisville Cardinals
- Position: Center
- Conference: Atlantic Coast Conference

Personal information
- Born: May 20, 2005 (age 21) Democratic Republic of the Congo
- Listed height: 6 ft 9 in (2.06 m)
- Listed weight: 235 lb (107 kg)

Career information
- High school: Kokomo (Kokomo, Indiana)
- College: Kansas (2024–2026); Louisville (2026–present)

Career highlights
- Big 12 Defensive Player of the Year (2026); First-team All-Big 12 (2026); Big 12 All-Defensive Team (2026); McDonald's All-American (2024); Nike Hoop Summit (2024); Indiana Mr. Basketball (2024)

Flory Bidunga (born May 20, 2005) is a Congolese college basketball player for the Louisville Cardinals of the Atlantic Coast Conference (ACC). He previously played for the Kansas Jayhawks.

== Early life and high school career ==
Bidunga grew up in Kinshasa, Democratic Republic of the Congo. He enrolled, at age 15, at Kokomo High School in Kokomo, Indiana via the school's International Baccalaureate program at the recommendation of his parents prior to the beginning of his sophomore year Bidunga averaged 17.5 points, 13.3 rebounds, and 5.3 blocks per game during his first season at Kokomo. As a junior, he was named the Indiana Gatorade Player of the Year after averaging 20.2 points, 13.8 rebounds, and 4.5 blocks per game. During the season Bidunga tied an Indiana High School Athletic Association (IHSAA) record by making 32 consecutive field goals. He also was a starter on Kokomo's varsity soccer team, joining the team during his senior year. Bidunga was selected to play in the 2024 McDonald's All-American Boys Game during his senior basketball season. He was also named the Indiana Gatorade Player of the Year and Indiana Mr. Basketball after averaging 19.0 points, 12.9 rebounds, 4.4 blocked shots, and 3.2 assists per contest.

=== Recruiting ===
Bidunga was a consensus five-star recruit and one of the top players in the 2024 class, according to major recruiting services. He was initially unranked, but rose to the top ten over a two-month period after his sophomore year following his performance playing in the Amateur Athletic Union circuit. Bidunga committed to play college basketball at Kansas after considering offers from Auburn, Duke, and Michigan. He signed a National Letter of Intent to play for the Jayhawks on November 9, 2023, during the early signing period.

== College career ==
Bidunga played in all 34 of Kansas' games during his freshman season, starting in six. He averaged 16.3 minutes played, 5.9 points, 5.4 rebounds, and 1.6 blocks per game. Bidunga averaged 13.3 points and 9.0 rebounds per game as a sophomore. Following the season he opted to transfer to Louisville.

== Career statistics ==
Legend
GP	Games played	GS	Games started	MPG	Minutes per game
FG%	Field goal percentage	3P%	3-point field goal percentage	FT%	Free throw percentage
RPG	Rebounds per game	APG	Assists per game	SPG	Steals per game
BPG	Blocks per game	PPG	Points per game	**Bold**	Career high

=== College ===
Year	Team	GP	GS	MPG	FG%	3P%	FT%	RPG	APG	SPG	BPG	PPG
2024–25	Kansas	34	6	16.3	.698	.000	.533	5.4	.3	.6	1.6	5.9
2025–26	Kansas	35	34	31.6	.640	.000	.654	9.0	1.5	.7	2.6	13.3
Career		69	40	24.1	.657	.000	.618	4.8	.9	.7	2.1	9.6
