= Moustapha Thiam =

Senegalese basketball player (born 2006)

No. 52 – Michigan Wolverines
- Position: Center
- Conference: Big Ten Conference

Personal information
- Born: February 21, 2006 (age 20) Dakar, Senegal
- Listed height: 7 ft 2 in (2.18 m)
- Listed weight: 250 lb (113 kg)

Career information
- High school: DME Academy (Daytona Beach, Florida)
- College: UCF (2024–2025); Cincinnati (2025–2026); Michigan (2026–present)

Mouhamadou Moustapha Thiam (born February 21, 2006) is a Senegalese college basketball player for the Michigan Wolverines of the Big Ten Conference. He previously played for the UCF Knights and Cincinnati Bearcats.

== Early life and high school ==
Thiam was born in Senegal, but would move to the United States in October 2022 where he attended high school at DME Academy. Coming out of high school, he was the top center in the class of 2025, but he would reclassify to the class of 2024 and commit to play college basketball for the UCF Knights.

== College career ==
=== UCF ===
On January 28, 2025, Thiam recorded a career-high 18 points versus Houston. On February 5, 2025, he tallied 14 points, eight rebounds, and a block in a loss to Cincinnati. On February 26, 2025, he notched his first career double-double, totaling 11 points, ten rebounds, and eight blocks in a win over Kansas State. Thiam finished his freshman season in 2024-25, starting all 34 games, averaging 10.4 points, 6.4 rebounds and 2.6 blocks per game. After the conclusion of the season, he decided to enter his name into the NCAA transfer portal.

=== Cincinnati ===
Thiam transferred to play for the Cincinnati Bearcats. On February 23, and March 1, 2026, Thiam earned Big 12 Starting Five recognitions for top-5 weekly individual performances announced alongside the Big 12 players of the week. Thiam earned 2026 Big 12 Men's Basketball All-Conference Team Honorable Mention recognition. He posted 12.8 points, 7.1 rebounds, and 1.6 blocks per game averages for the season. When he entered the transfer portal he was listed as the 12th-best player available and the third-best center by 247Sports.

=== Michigan ===
On April 24, 2026, Thiam transferred to the University of Michigan to play for Dusty May and the Wolverines. He opted to stay committed after May's departure for the Dallas Mavericks.
