= PJ Haggerty =

American basketball player (born 2004)

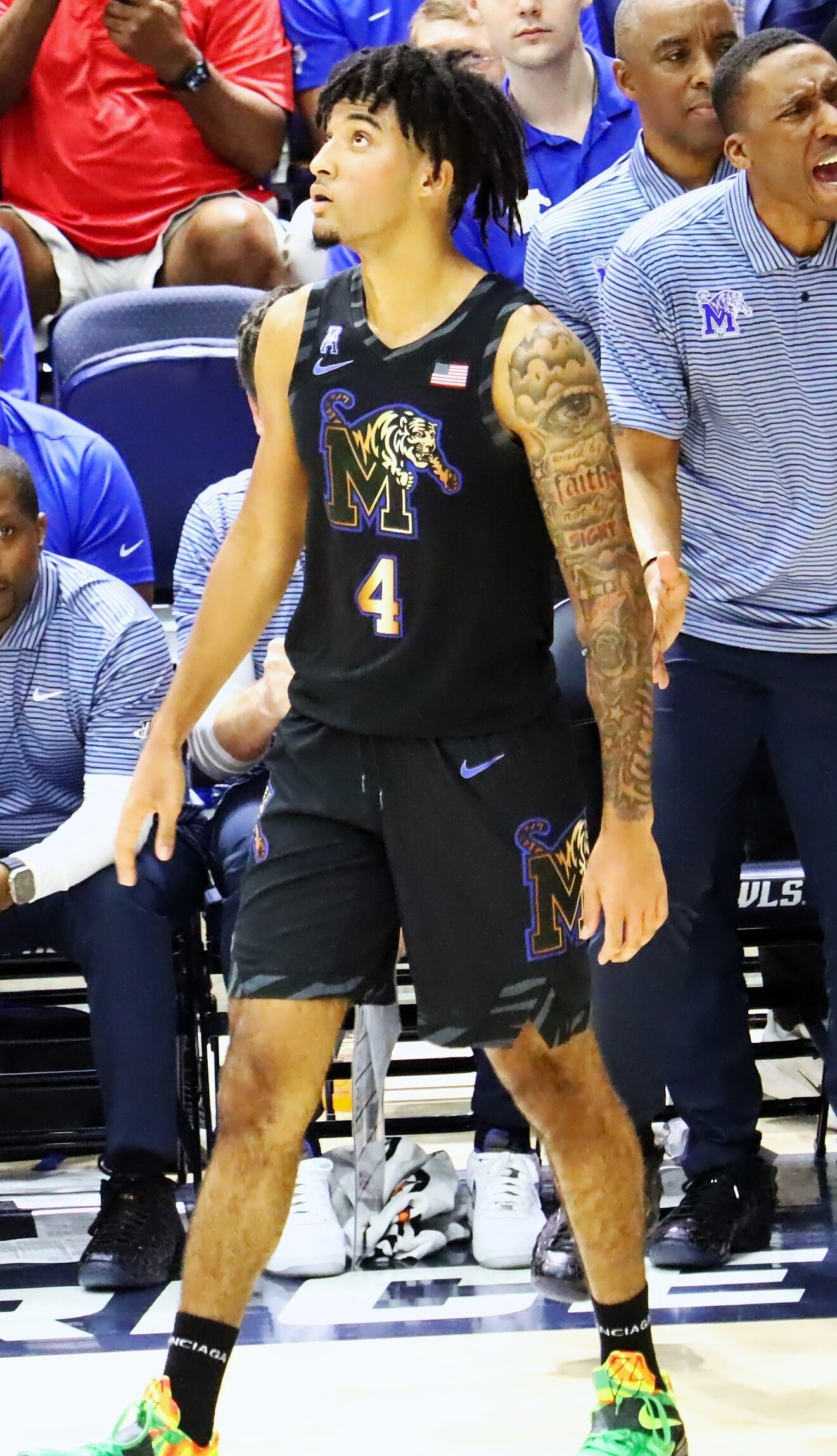

No. 4 – Texas A&M Aggies
- Position: Shooting guard
- Conference: Southeastern Conference

Personal information
- Born: April 13, 2004 (age 22) Baytown, Texas, U.S.
- Listed height: 6 ft 4 in (1.93 m)
- Listed weight: 195 lb (88 kg)

Career information
- High school: Crosby (Crosby, Texas)
- College: TCU (2022–2023); Tulsa (2023–2024); Memphis (2024–2025); Kansas State (2025–2026); Texas A&M (2026–present)

Career highlights
- Consensus second-team All-American (2025); AAC Player of the Year (2025); First-team All-AAC (2025); Third-team All-AAC (2024); AAC Freshman of the Year (2024); Texas Mr. Basketball (2022)

Shawn Patrick “PJ” Haggerty (born April 13, 2004) is an American college basketball player for the Texas A&M Aggies of the Southeastern Conference (SEC). He previously played for the TCU Horned Frogs, Tulsa Golden Hurricane, Memphis Tigers, and Kansas State Wildcats.

== Life and high school ==
Born in Baytown, Texas, Haggerty attended Crosby High School in Crosby, Texas. He was rated as a three-star recruit and committed to play college basketball for the TCU Horned Frogs over offers from schools such as Arizona, Arizona State, Auburn, and Texas A&M.

== College career ==
=== TCU ===
As a freshman at TCU in 2022–23, Haggerty played six games and took a redshirt. After the season, he entered his name into the NCAA transfer portal.

=== Tulsa ===
Haggerty transferred to play for the Tulsa Golden Hurricane. On January 4, 2024, he put up 27 points while also adding eight rebounds, four assists, and three steals versus Memphis. On February 17, 2024, Haggerty notched 30 points, 10 rebounds, and six assists in a win over Rice. On March 9, 2024, he scored a career-high 32 points, as he helped Tulsa to an upset win over South Florida. Haggerty finished the 2023–24 season averaging 21.2 points, 5.5 rebounds, 3.8 assists and 1.9 steals on 49.3% shooting for the Golden Hurricane. He earned multiple honors including being named third-team all-conference, the AAC freshman of the year, and the national freshman of the year. After the season, Haggerty entered his name into the NCAA transfer portal once again.

=== Memphis ===
Haggerty transferred to play for the Memphis Tigers. Heading into the 2024–25 season, he was named to the preseason first-team all-conference team. Haggerty was named a midseason all-American and was candidate for the National Player of the year. On January 5, 2025, he scored 27 points, while also adding on five rebounds, and three steals in a win over North Texas. On January 11, 2025, Haggerty dropped 25 points in a win over East Carolina. After winning the 2024–25 American Regular Season Championship, Haggerty was named conference player of the year. He led the conference in scoring with 21.2 points per game, was third in steals with 1.8 per game, and ninth in assists with 3.8 per game during the regular season. In the 2025 American Athletic Conference men's basketball tournament quarterfinal, Haggerty scored a career-high 42 points and tied the single game AAC tournament scoring record as the Tigers beat the Wichita State Shockers 83–80.

=== Kansas State ===
Haggerty transferred to play for the Kansas State Wildcats on May 26, 2025.

=== Texas A&M ===
Haggerty transferred to Texas A&M on April 10th, 2026.

== Career statistics ==
Legend
GP	Games played	GS	Games started	MPG	Minutes per game
FG%	Field goal percentage	3P%	3-point field goal percentage	FT%	Free throw percentage
RPG	Rebounds per game	APG	Assists per game	SPG	Steals per game
BPG	Blocks per game	PPG	Points per game	**Bold**	Career high

=== College ===
Year	Team	GP	GS	MPG	FG%	3P%	FT%	RPG	APG	SPG	BPG	PPG
2022–23	TCU	6	1	8.8	**.556**	.000	.778	1.5	.8	.3	.0	2.8
2023–24	Tulsa	31	31	33.7	.493	.289	.767	5.5	**3.8**	**1.9**	.0	21.2
2024–25	Memphis	**35**	**35**	**36.6**	.476	**.364**	**.818**	**5.8**	3.7	1.8	**.1**	21.7
2025–26	Kansas State	31	31	35.3	.489	.351	.701	5.3	**3.8**	1.2	.0	**23.4**
Career		103	97	33.7	.486	.339	.768	5.3	3.6	1.6	.0	21.0
