= Darryn Peterson =

American basketball player (born 2007)

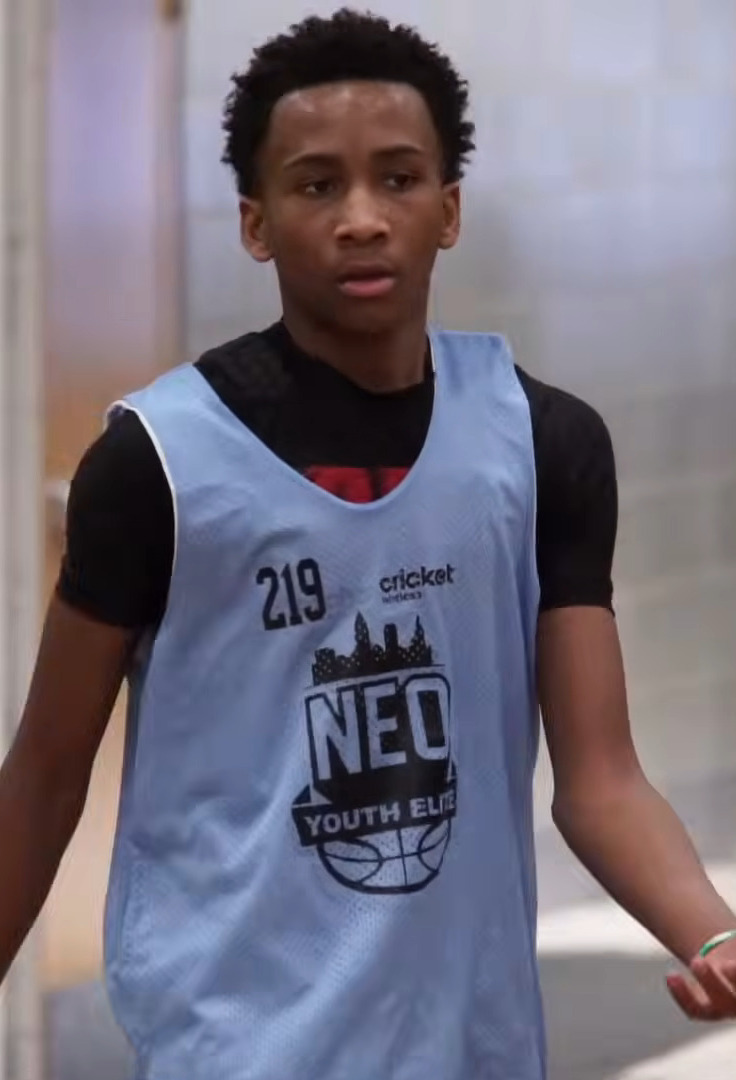
- Peterson in 2020

No. 22 – Utah Jazz
- Position: Shooting guard / point guard
- League: NBA

Personal information
- Born: January 17, 2007 (age 19) Canton, Ohio, U.S.
- Listed height: 6 ft 6 in (1.98 m)
- Listed weight: 205 lb (93 kg)

Career information
- High school: Cuyahoga Valley Christian Academy (Cuyahoga Falls, Ohio); Huntington Prep (Huntington, West Virginia); Prolific Prep (Napa, California)
- College: Kansas (2025–2026)
- NBA draft: 2026: 1st round, 2nd overall pick
- Drafted by: Utah Jazz
- Playing career: 2026–present

Career history
- 2026–present: Utah Jazz

Career highlights
- Second-team All-Big 12 (2026); Big 12 All-Freshman Team (2026); Naismith Prep Player of the Year (2025); McDonald's All-American Co-MVP (2025)
- Stats at NBA.com
- Stats at Basketball Reference
Medals
Men's basketball
Representing United States
FIBA Under-16 Americas Championship
| Gold medal – first place | 2023 Mérida | Team |

Darryn Wayne Peterson (born January 17, 2007) is an American professional basketball player for the Utah Jazz of the National Basketball Association (NBA). He played college basketball for the Kansas Jayhawks. A consensus five-star recruit, he was one of the top-ranked players of the 2025 class. Peterson was selected by the Jazz with the second-overall pick in the 2026 NBA draft.

== Early life ==
Peterson was born and raised in Canton, Ohio. His father, Darryl Peterson II, played basketball at Western Hills High School in Cincinnati from 1997 to 2001 and at the University of Akron from 2001 to 2006. His older brother, Darryl Peterson III, won multiple state football titles at Archbishop Hoban High School in Akron before playing at the University of Wisconsin.

Peterson attended Hartford Middle School in Canton. He then enrolled at Cuyahoga Valley Christian Academy (CVCA) over nearby Canton McKinley High School due to academic reasons. Additionally, CVCA head basketball coach Matt Futch was teammates with his father at Akron.

As a freshman, Peterson averaged 26.1 points, 10.5 rebounds and 5.8 assists per game, leading his team to a 16–8 record and an appearance in the OHSAA Division II district title game. He was the only freshman named to the All-Ohio Division II first team despite missing the start of the season due to a foot injury. As a sophomore, Peterson averaged 31 points, 9.8 rebounds, 2.8 steals and 1.3 assists per game, leading CVCA to an 18–7 record and their second straight appearance in the OHSAA Division II district title game. Aside from earning first-team All-Ohio Division II honors for the second year in a row, he was named the Division II Northeast Inland District Player of the Year and a finalist for the Ohio Mr. Basketball award.

On August 2, 2023, Peterson announced he was transferring to Huntington Prep School in Huntington, West Virginia.

On August 12, 2024, Peterson announced he was transferring to Prolific Prep in Napa, California for his senior season. Peterson was named a McDonald's All-American after averaging 30.4 points, 7.2 rebounds, 7.4 assists and 2.2 steals per game.

=== Recruiting ===
Peterson was a consensus five-star recruit and one of the top players in the 2025 class, according to major recruiting services. He received his first offers from St. John's and Xavier when he was still in the eighth grade. In September 2024, Peterson narrowed a previous list of eight choices down to Kansas, Kansas State, Ohio State and USC. On November 1, 2024, he committed to playing college basketball at Kansas. Kansas coach Bill Self said: "Darryn's the best player we've recruited since we've been here. He's a special talent."

College recruiting
| Name | Hometown | School | Height | Weight | Commit date |
|---|---|---|---|---|---|
| Darryn Peterson; SG | Huntington, WV | Huntington Prep (WV) | 6 ft 5 in (1.96 m) | 195 lb (88 kg) | Nov 1, 2024 |
| Darryn Peterson; SG | Recruit ratings: Rivals: 247Sports: ESPN: (96) | | | | |
Overall recruit ranking: Rivals: 2 247Sports: 1 ESPN: 2
Note: In many cases, Scout, Rivals, 247Sports, On3, and ESPN may conflict in their listings of height and weight.; In these cases, the average was taken. ESPN grades are on a 100-point scale.; Sources: "2025 Team Ranking". Rivals.

== College career ==
As a freshman at Kansas in 2025–2026, Peterson had limited availability. Through the Jayhawks' first 27 games, he sat out 11 and played fewer than 25 minutes in seven of his 16 appearances as a result of hamstring and ankle injuries, including persistent cramping. Peterson scored a career-high 32 points on January 6, 2026, helping the team to a 104–100 overtime win over TCU. He also scored 28 points in a 68–60 win over California Baptist in his NCAA tournament debut. Peterson averaged 20.2 points, 4.2 rebounds, 1.6 assists, and 1.4 steals per game, earning second-team All-Big 12 Conference honors. He was also named an honorable mention All-American by the Associated Press and the U.S. Basketball Writers Association.

== Professional career ==
On June 23, 2026, Peterson was selected with the second overall pick by the Utah Jazz in the 2026 NBA Draft.

On October 21, Peterson made his NBA regular-season debut, putting up nine points, four rebounds, and three assists in a 123–103 loss to the Memphis Grizzlies. On November 14, Peterson put up a career-high 28 points with seven rebounds, two assists, and two steals in a 125–118 loss to the Houston Rockets.

== National team career ==
Peterson represented the United States at the 2023 FIBA Under-16 Americas Championship in Mexico. He averaged 16.8 points, 3.8 rebounds, 3.7 assists and 3.3 steals in under 18 minutes per game, leading his team to a gold medal and earning all-tournament honors. Peterson recorded 13 points and seven assists in their 118–36 win against Canada in the final.

== Personal life ==
In November 2023, after transferring to Huntington Prep, Peterson became the first high school athlete to sign a Name, Image and Likeness (NIL) deal with Adidas. A few weeks later, he signed a multi-year endorsement deal with Fanatics, Inc., becoming the youngest athlete to sign a deal with a trading card company.

His older brother, Darryl Peterson III, plays in the National Football League for the Los Angeles Rams.

== Career statistics ==
Legend
| GP | Games played | GS | Games started | MPG | Minutes per game |
| FG% | Field goal percentage | 3P% | 3-point field goal percentage | FT% | Free throw percentage |
| RPG | Rebounds per game | APG | Assists per game | SPG | Steals per game |
| BPG | Blocks per game | PPG | Points per game | **Bold** | Career high |

=== College ===
| Year | Team | GP | GS | MPG | FG% | 3P% | FT% | RPG | APG | SPG | BPG | PPG |
|---|---|---|---|---|---|---|---|---|---|---|---|---|
| 2025–26 | Kansas | 24 | 23 | 29.0 | .438 | .382 | .826 | 4.2 | 1.6 | 1.4 | .6 | 20.2 |
