= Cameron Carr (basketball) =

American basketball player (born 2004)

No. 43 – Los Angeles Lakers
- Position: Shooting guard
- League: NBA

Personal information
- Born: November 24, 2004 (age 21) Eden Prairie, Minnesota, U.S.
- Listed height: 6 ft 5 in (1.96 m)
- Listed weight: 175 lb (79 kg)

Career information
- High school: Manhattan (Manhattan, Kansas); Link Academy (Branson, Missouri)
- College: Tennessee (2023–2025); Baylor (2025–2026)
- NBA draft: 2026: 1st round, 24th overall pick
- Drafted by: New York Knicks
- Playing career: 2026–present

Career history
- 2026–present: Los Angeles Lakers
- 2026: →Coachella Valley Lakers

Career highlights
- Third-team All-Big 12 (2026); Big 12 All-Newcomer Team (2026)
- Stats at NBA.com
- Stats at Basketball Reference
Medals
Men's basketball
Representing United States
Summer World University Games
Silver medal – second place	2025 Germany	Team competition

Cameron Louis Christopher Carr (born November 24, 2004) is an American basketball player for the Los Angeles Lakers of the National Basketball Association (NBA). He played college basketball for the Tennessee Volunteers and Baylor Bears.

== Early life and high school ==
Carr initially attended Manhattan High School in Manhattan, Kansas. He averaged 10.9 points and four rebounds per game as a sophomore. After his sophomore year, Carr transferred to Link Academy in Branson, Missouri. Carr was rated a four-star recruit and committed to play college basketball at Tennessee over offers from Kansas State, Northwestern, and Virginia.

== College career ==
Carr began his college basketball career at Tennessee. He averaged 1.6 points per game over 14 games played as a freshman. Carr suffered a thumb injury four games into his sophomore season. In December 2024, he abruptly left the program and entered the NCAA transfer portal.

Carr committed to transfer to Baylor. He averaged 18.9 points, 5.8 rebounds and 2.6 assists per game. Carr declared for the 2026 NBA draft after the season.

== Professional career ==
Carr was selected in the first round with the 24th overall pick by the New York Knicks, but was subsequently traded to the Los Angeles Lakers in the 2026 NBA draft in exchange for the draft rights of Sergio de Larrea. He chose jersey number 43 in tribute to his father who wore the same number.

== National team career ==
Carr was a part of the Baylor team chosen to represent the United States in the 2025 Summer World University Games in Germany.

== Career statistics ==
Legend
GP	Games played	GS	Games started	MPG	Minutes per game
FG%	Field goal percentage	3P%	3-point field goal percentage	FT%	Free throw percentage
RPG	Rebounds per game	APG	Assists per game	SPG	Steals per game
BPG	Blocks per game	PPG	Points per game	**Bold**	Career high

=== College ===
Year	Team	GP	GS	MPG	FG%	3P%	FT%	RPG	APG	SPG	BPG	PPG
2023–24	Tennessee	14	0	4.3	.296	.278	.667	.6	.5	.1	.1	1.6
2024–25	Tennessee	4	0	10.3	**.625**	**.400**	.778	1.5	1.0	.0	.5	4.8
2025–26	Baylor	**34**	**34**	**33.7**	.494	.374	**.801**	**5.8**	**2.6**	**.9**	**1.3**	**18.9**
Career		52	34	24.0	.485	.367	.798	4.1	1.9	.6	0.9	13.2

== Personal life ==
Carr's father, Chris Carr, played six seasons in the National Basketball Association and is currently an assistant basketball coach at Drury University.
