= 2025–26 Arizona Wildcats men's basketball team =

American college basketball season

2025–26 Arizona Wildcats men's basketball

Big 12 regular season and tournament champions

NCAA tournament, Final Four
- Conference: Big 12 Conference

Ranking
- Coaches: No. 3
- AP: No. 3
- Record: 36–3 (16–2 Big 12)
- Head coach: Tommy Lloyd (5th season)
- Associate head coach: Jack Murphy (7th season)
- Assistant coaches: TJ Benson (2nd season); Ken Nakagawa (2nd season); Brandon Chappell (1st season); Evan Manning (1st season)
- Home arena: McKale Center

2025–26 Big 12 men's basketball standings
	Conf.				Overall
Team	W		L	PCT	W		L	PCT
No. 3 Arizona †	16	–	2	.889	36	–	3	.923
No. 7 Houston	14	–	4	.778	30	–	7	.811
No. 20 Kansas	12	–	6	.667	24	–	11	.686
No. 21 Texas Tech	12	–	6	.667	23	–	11	.676
No. 8 Iowa State	12	–	6	.667	29	–	8	.784
TCU	11	–	7	.611	23	–	12	.657
West Virginia	9	–	9	.500	21	–	14	.600
UCF	9	–	9	.500	21	–	12	.636
Cincinnati	9	–	9	.500	18	–	15	.545
BYU	9	–	9	.500	23	–	12	.657
Colorado	7	–	11	.389	17	–	16	.515
Arizona State	7	–	11	.389	17	–	16	.515
Baylor	6	–	12	.333	17	–	17	.500
Oklahoma State	6	–	12	.333	20	–	15	.571
Kansas State	3	–	15	.167	12	–	20	.375
Utah	2	–	16	.111	10	–	22	.313
† 2026 Big 12 tournament winner Rankings from AP poll

The 2025–26 Arizona Wildcats men's basketball team represented the University of Arizona during the 2025–26 NCAA Division I men's basketball season. The team was led by Tommy Lloyd in his fifth season as head coach. The season marked the Wildcats' 52nd season at McKale Center in Tucson, Arizona, and their second season as members of the Big 12 Conference.

Arizona won their first Big 12 regular season title and 30th regular season conference title in school history. They are also the first Arizona team to have 29 regular season wins, and have the most wins in a season, with 36. The Arizona Wildcats drew an average home attendance of 14,297, the 15th-highest of all college basketball teams.

== Previous season ==
The Wildcats finished the 2024–25 season 24–13, 14–6 in Big 12 Conference play, finishing tied for third and received the number 3 seed in the Big 12 tournament. They lost to number 1 seed Houston in the finals 72–64. The Wildcats were invited to their 35th NCAA tournament appearance, receiving the number 4 seed in the East Regional. They lost in the Sweet Sixteen to number 1 seed Duke.

== Offseason ==
=== Coaching staff changes ===
Former assistant coach Steve Robinson announced his retirement following a 42-year long coaching career. He held jobs previously at Tulsa and Florida State as the head coach, as well as Radford, Cornell, Kansas and North Carolina as an assistant coach. On May 5, 2025, Arizona hired former Texas assistant coach Brandon Chappell as the replacement for Robinson. Chappell spent the previous three seasons with Texas as an assistant, as well as assistant coach with UNLV, Lamar (his alma mater) Arkansas-Fort Smith and Northern Arizona as a graduate assistant under current associate head coach Murphy. On August 1, 2025 Rem Bakamus took an assistant coaching position with Texas Tech. On September 4, 2025 Arizona promoted Evan Manning to assistant coach and hired Austin Torres as director of basketball operations.

=== Departures ===
Any players who have declared for the 2025 NBA draft—including seniors, who must opt into this year's draft—have the option to return if they make a timely withdrawal from the draft and end any pre-draft relationships with agents. Thus, separate lists will initially be maintained for confirmed and potential departures.

Arizona Wildcats departures
Name	Number	Pos.	Height	Weight	Year	Hometown	Reason
Carter Bryant	9	SF	6'8"	220 lb	So.	Corona, CA	Drafted by the San Antonio Spurs
Luke Champion	24	F	6'8"	205 lb	Gr	Suwanee, GA	Out of eligibility
Will Kuykendall	12	G	6'3"	175 lb	So.	Santa Maria, CA	Transferred to Baylor
KJ Lewis	5	SF	6'4"	210 lb	Jr.	El Paso, TX	Transferred to Georgetown
Caleb Love	1	SG	6'4"	205 lb	Gr	St. Louis, MO	Signed with the Portland Trail Blazers
Liam Lloyd	11	G	6'5"	190 lb	Sr.	Spokane, WA	Out of eligibility
Conrad Martinez	55	G	6'0"	165 lb	Jr.	Granollers, Spain	Transferred to High Point
Will Menaugh	33	F	6'10"	245 lb	Sr.	Tucson, AZ	Out of eligibility
Emmanuel Stephen	34	C	7'0"	260 lb	So.	Glendale, AZ	Transferred to UNLV
Trey Townsend	4	F	6'6"	220 lb	Sr.	Oxford, MI	Out of eligibility
Henri Veesaar	13	C	7'0"	225 lb	(redshirt) Jr.	Tallinn, Estonia	Transferred to North Carolina
Grant Weitman	15	G	6'4"	205 lb	Gr	Tucson, AZ	Out of eligibility

=== Acquisitions ===
==== Transfers ====
Arizona Wildcats transfers
Name	Number	Pos.	Height	Weight	Year	Hometown	Reason
Evan Nelson	11	PG	6'2"	170 lb	Gr	Tucson, AZ	Transfer from Harvard

=== Recruiting classes ===
==== 2025 recruiting class ====
College recruiting
Name	Hometown	School	Height	Weight	Commit date
Koa Peat; Power forward	Gilbert, AZ	Perry High School	6 ft 7 in (2.01 m)	235 lb (107 kg)	Mar 27, 2025
Koa Peat; Power forward	Recruit ratings: Rivals: 247Sports: On3: ESPN: (93)				
Brayden Burries; Combo guard	San Bernardino, CA	Eleanor Roosevelt High School	6 ft 4 in (1.93 m)	185 lb (84 kg)	Apr 9, 2025
Brayden Burries; Combo guard	Recruit ratings: Rivals: 247Sports: On3: ESPN: (93)				
Dwayne Aristode; Small forward	Lelystad, Netherlands	Brewster Academy (NH)	6 ft 7 in (2.01 m)	210 lb (95 kg)	Oct 14, 2024
Dwayne Aristode; Small forward	Recruit ratings: Rivals: 247Sports: On3: ESPN: (87)				
Bryce James; Shooting guard	Cuyahoga Falls, OH	Sierra Canyon School (CA)	6 ft 4 in (1.93 m)	190 lb (86 kg)	Jan 1, 2025
Bryce James; Shooting guard	Recruit ratings: Rivals: 247Sports: On3: ESPN: (79)				
Sidi Gueye; Center	Guédiawaye, Senegal	Real Madrid (ESP)	6 ft 11 in (2.11 m)	205 lb (93 kg)	Apr 30, 2025
Sidi Gueye; Center	Recruit ratings: No ratings found				
Mawut Mabil; Forward	South Sudan	Our Saviour Lutheran School (NY)	6 ft 11 in (2.11 m)	205 lb (93 kg)	May 1, 2025
Mawut Mabil; Forward	Recruit ratings: No ratings found				
Ivan Kharchenkov; Forward	Moscow, Russia	FC Bayern Munich (GER)	6 ft 6 in (1.98 m)	225 lb (102 kg)	Jun 2, 2025
Ivan Kharchenkov; Forward	Recruit ratings: No ratings found				
Overall recruit ranking: Rivals: 1 247Sports: 3 On3: 3 ESPN: 4
Note: In many cases, Scout, Rivals, 247Sports, On3, and ESPN may conflict in their listings of height and weight.; In these cases, the average was taken. ESPN grades are on a 100-point scale.; Sources: "Arizona 2025 Basketball Commitments". Rivals.; "2025 Arizona Wildcats Basketball Recruiting Class". ESPN.; "2025 Team Ranking". Rivals.; "2025 Arizona 24/7 Sports Basketball Commits". 247Sports.; "Arizona 2025 Basketball Commitments". On3.

2025 overall class rankings

Website	National rank	Conference rank	5-star recruits	4-star recruits	Total
ESPN	4	2	2	2	4
On3 Recruits	3	2	2	1	3
Rivals	1	1	3	0	3
247 Sports	3	2	3	0	3

*ESPN has not made 2025 recruiting class rankings yet.

=== Red and Blue game ===
Arizona played its annual Red Blue game on October 3, 2025. The team was split into two teams, Red and Blue and proceeded to play an inter-squad scrimmage. The night featured a basketball game with Arizona's Adaptive Athletics wheelchair basketball team, a three-point contest that had two members of the men's team: Anthony Dell'Orso and Evan Nelson and two members of the Arizona women's team: Mickayla Perdue and Mireia Jurado and a dunk contest featuring four members of the men's team: Dwayne Aristode, Mabil Mawut, Addison Arnold, and Koa Peat.

The three point contest was won won by Dell'Orso, who defeated Perdue of the women's team, 19−18 in the final round. The dunk contest was judged by Hannah Fields, Myles O'Neal, Rob Gronkowski, Mix Master Mike, and Camille Kostek. The two final contestants of the dunk contest were Aristode and Arnold but the dunk contest was won by Gronkowski who jumped over a power wheel car, with all the judges giving him a ten for a combined score of fifty.

In the inter-squad scrimmage the Red team, which was coached by assistant coach TJ Benson defeated the Blue team 45−44, which was coached by assistant coach Ken Nakagawa. Brayden Burries, who played on the Red team, led all scoring with twenty-two points, four players: Dell'Orso (Blue), Motiejus Krivas (Blue), Burries (Red) and Tobe Awaka (Red) had five rebounds, and Jaden Bradley led both teams in assists with four. Gronkowski, snuck onto the court to play with the Blue team wearing a wig, fake mustache and jersey with the name "Rocky Gronkstone", but was ejected by the officials.

== Preseason ==
The Big 12 preseason coaches poll was released on October 16, 2025. All awards were voted on by the league's 16 head coaches, who could not vote for their own team or players. The Big 12 preseason media poll was released on October 30, 2025.

Big 12 Preseason Coaches Poll

	Big 12 Coaches	Points
1.	Houston	224 (12)
2.	BYU	204 (1)
3.	Texas Tech	200
4.	Arizona	179 (1)
5.	Iowa State	170
6.	Kansas	163
7.	Baylor	137
8.	Cincinnati	120
9.	Kansas State	117
10.	TCU	90
11.	West Virginia	79
12.	Oklahoma State	77
13.	Utah	50
14.	UCF	39
15.	Colorado	37
16.	Arizona State	34
Reference: (#) first-place votes

Big 12 Preseason Media Poll

	Big 12 Media
1.	Houston
2.	Texas Tech
3.	BYU
4.	Arizona
5.	Iowa State
6.	Kansas
7.	Baylor
8.	Kansas State
9.	Cincinnati
10.	TCU
11.	West Virginia
12.	Oklahoma State
13.	Utah
14.	UCF
15.	Colorado
16.	Arizona State

=== Award watch lists ===
Listed in the order that they were released

Award	Player	Position	Year	Source
Jerry West Award	Brayden Burries	Shooting Guard	Freshman	
Karl Malone Award	Koa Peat	Power Forward	Freshman	
John R. Wooden Award	Koa Peat	Power Forward	Freshman	
Naismith Award	Koa Peat	Power Forward	Freshman	
Oscar Robertson Trophy	Jaden Bradley	Point Guard	Senior	

== Personnel ==
=== Roster ===
Roster below is based on the 2025–26 roster with outgoing players removed and incoming players added. The roster will undergo multiple changes as players leave via the NBA draft or transfers and players are added via the transfer portal and recruiting.

2025–26 Arizona Wildcats men's basketball team
Players
Coaches

Pos.	#	Name	Height	Weight	Year	Previous school	Hometown
G	0	Jaden Bradley	6 ft 3 in (1.91 m)	200 lb (91 kg)	Sr	Alabama	Rochester, NY
F	2	Dwayne Aristode	6 ft 7 in (2.01 m)	210 lb (95 kg)	Fr	Brewster Academy (NH)	Lelystad, Netherlands
G	3	Anthony Dell'Orso	6 ft 6 in (1.98 m)	190 lb (86 kg)	Sr	Campbell	Melbourne, Australia
G	5	Brayden Burries	6 ft 4 in (1.93 m)	185 lb (84 kg)	Fr	Eleanor Roosevelt HS	San Bernardino, CA
G	6	Bryce James (redshirt)	6 ft 4 in (1.93 m)	190 lb (86 kg)	Fr	Sierra Canyon School (CA)	Akron, OH
G	7	Jackson Francois (W)	6 ft 5 in (1.96 m)	160 lb (73 kg)	Sr	Missouri	Las Vegas, NV
F	8	Ivan Kharchenkov	6 ft 6 in (1.98 m)	225 lb (102 kg)	Fr	FC Bayern Munich (GER)	Munich, Germany
F	10	Koa Peat	6 ft 7 in (2.01 m)	235 lb (107 kg)	Fr	Perry HS	Chandler, AZ
G	11	Jackson Cook (W)	6 ft 3 in (1.91 m)	175 lb (79 kg)	RS So	Montverde Academy (FL)	Oxford, England
C	13	Motiejus Krivas	7 ft 2 in (2.18 m)	260 lb (118 kg)	Jr	Kaunas Zalgiris II (LTU)	Šiauliai, Lithuania
C	15	Sidi Gueye	6 ft 11 in (2.11 m)	205 lb (93 kg)	Fr	Real Madrid (ESP)	Guédiawaye, Senegal
F/C	20	Mabil Mawut (redshirt)	6 ft 11 in (2.11 m)	205 lb (93 kg)	Fr	Our Saviour Lutheran School (NY)	Bor, South Sudan
G	21	Evan Nelson	6 ft 4 in (1.93 m)	170 lb (77 kg)	GS	Harvard	Tucson, AZ
G	22	Addison Arnold	6 ft 3 in (1.91 m)	190 lb (86 kg)	So	Royal HS (CA)	Simi Valley, CA
F	30	Tobe Awaka	6 ft 8 in (2.03 m)	250 lb (113 kg)	Sr	Tennessee	Hyde Park, NY
G	42	Sven Djopmo (W)	6 ft 2 in (1.88 m)	175 lb (79 kg)	So	Nanterre 92 (FRA)	Reims, France

Head coach

- Tommy Lloyd (Whitman)

Assistant coach(es)

- Jack Murphy (Arizona)
- TJ Benson (Grand Canyon)
- Brandon Chappell (Lamar)
- Ken Nakagawa (Long Beach State)
- Evan Manning (Kansas)

Legend

- (C) Team captain
- (S) Suspended
- (I) Ineligible
- (W) Walk-on
- Injured
- Current redshirt

Roster

Note: Players' year is based on remaining eligibility.

== Schedule and results ==
Date time, TV	Rank^{#}	Opponent^{#}	Result	Record	High points	High rebounds	High assists	Site (attendance) city, state
Exhibition
October 18, 2025*; 2:00 p.m., ESPN+	No. 13	Saint Mary's	W 81–68	–	23 – J. Bradley	17 – M. Krivas	4 – J. Bradley	McKale Center (13,328); Tucson, AZ
October 27, 2025*; 7:00 p.m., ESPN+	No. 13	Embry–Riddle	W 113–42	–	18 – T. Awaka	14 – T. Awaka	4 – E. Nelson	McKale Center (12,558); Tucson, AZ
Non-conference regular season
November 3, 2025*; 5:00 p.m., TNT/TruTV	No. 13	vs. No. 3 Florida; Hall of Fame Series − Las Vegas	W 93–87	1–0	30 – K. Peat	10 – I. Kharchenkov	5 – Tied	T-Mobile Arena (16,704); Las Vegas, NV
November 7, 2025*; 7:00 p.m., TNT/TruTV	No. 13	Utah Tech	W 93–67	2–0	18 – Tied	18 – T. Awaka	6 – J. Bradley	McKale Center (14,082); Tucson, AZ
November 11, 2025*; 7:00 p.m., ESPN+	No. 5	Northern Arizona	W 84–49	3–0	18 – D. Aristode	9 – T. Awaka	4 – I. Kharchenkov	McKale Center (13,740); Tucson, AZ
November 14, 2025*; 8:00 p.m., Peacock	No. 5	vs. No. 15 UCLA; Rivalry/Hall of Fame Series − Los Angeles	W 69–65	4–0	20 – A. Dell’Orso	10 – T. Awaka	3 – Tied	Intuit Dome (7,554); Inglewood, CA
November 19, 2025*; 5:00 p.m., FS1	No. 4	at No. 3 UConn	W 71–67	5–0	21 – J. Bradley	14 – M. Krivas	3 – K. Peat	Gampel Pavilion (10,244); Storrs, CT
November 24, 2025*; 8:30 p.m., CBSSN	No. 2	Denver; Wildcat Classic	W 103–73	6–0	20 – Tied	15 – T. Awaka	6 – A. Dell’Orso	McKale Center (13,556); Tucson, AZ
November 29, 2025*; 2:00 p.m., ESPN+	No. 2	Norfolk State	W 98–61	7–0	20 – M. Krivas	9 – M. Krivas	4 – Tied	McKale Center (13,461); Tucson, AZ
December 6, 2025*; 8:00 p.m., ESPN	No. 2	No. 20 Auburn	W 97–68	8–0	18 – K. Peat	9 – M. Krivas	8 – I. Kharchenkov	McKale Center (14,688); Tucson, AZ
December 13, 2025*; 7:30 p.m., ESPN	No. 1	vs. No. 12 Alabama; C.M. Newton Classic	W 96–75	9–0	28 – B. Burries	15 – T. Awaka	6 – J. Bradley	Legacy Arena (14,948); Birmingham, AL
December 16, 2025*; 7:00 p.m., ESPN+	No. 1	Abilene Christian	W 96–62	10–0	20 – B. Burries	7 – Tied	4 – J. Bradley	McKale Center (13,092); Tucson, AZ
December 20, 2025*; 8:30 p.m., ESPN2	No. 1	vs. San Diego State; Hall of Fame Series − Phoenix	W 68–45	11–0	11 – Tied	15 – T. Awaka	3 – J. Bradley	Mortgage Matchup Center (10,567); Phoenix, AZ
December 22, 2025*; 7:00 p.m., ESPN+	No. 1	Bethune–Cookman	W 107–71	12–0	20 – B. Burries	8 – T. Awaka	5 – J. Bradley	McKale Center (14,378); Tucson, AZ
December 29, 2025*; 7:00 p.m., ESPN+	No. 1	South Dakota State	W 99–71	13–0	19 – K. Peat	14 – K. Peat	10 – J. Bradley	McKale Center (14,501); Tucson, AZ
Big 12 regular season
January 3, 2026; 2:00 p.m., Peacock	No. 1	at Utah	W 97–78	14–0 (1–0)	18 – Tied	12 – T. Awaka	5 – J. Bradley	Jon M. Huntsman Center (8,339); Salt Lake City, UT
January 7, 2026; 7:00 p.m., FS1	No. 1	Kansas State	W 101–76	15–0 (2–0)	28 – B. Burries	12 – M. Krivas	5 – J. Bradley	McKale Center (14,357); Tucson, AZ
January 10, 2026; 2:00 p.m., ESPN	No. 1	at TCU	W 86–73	16–0 (3–0)	20 – K. Peat	10 – M. Krivas	6 – I. Kharchenkov	Schollmaier Arena (6,082); Fort Worth, TX
January 14, 2026; 8:30 p.m., FS1	No. 1	Arizona State; Rivalry	W 89–82	17–0 (4–0)	25 – T. Awaka	10 – K. Peat	4 – J. Bradley	McKale Center (14,688); Tucson, AZ
January 17, 2026; 2:00 p.m., ESPN	No. 1	at UCF	W 84–77	18–0 (5–0)	23 – J. Bradley	12 – M. Krivas	5 – J. Bradley	Addition Financial Arena (10,000); Orlando, FL
January 21, 2026; 7:00 p.m., FS1	No. 1	Cincinnati	W 77–51	19–0 (6–0)	17 – M. Krivas	10 – B. Burries	4 – Tied	McKale Center (14,380); Tucson, AZ
January 24, 2026; 12:00 p.m., CBS	No. 1	West Virginia	W 88–53	20–0 (7–0)	22 – B. Burries	14 – T. Awaka	7 – B. Burries	McKale Center (14,688); Tucson, AZ
January 26, 2026; 7:00 p.m., ESPN	No. 1	at No. 13 BYU	W 86–83	21–0 (8–0)	29 – B. Burries	8 – M. Krivas	4 – B. Burries	Marriott Center (18,239); Provo, UT
January 31, 2026; 12:00 p.m., TNT	No. 1	at Arizona State; Rivalry	W 87–74	22–0 (9–0)	21 – K. Peat	13 – T. Awaka	6 – J. Bradley	Desert Financial Arena (13,838); Tempe, AZ
February 7, 2026; 2:00 p.m., ESPN	No. 1	Oklahoma State	W 84–47	23–0 (10–0)	15 – B. Burries	12 – T. Awaka	4 – J. Bradley	McKale Center (14,688); Tucson, AZ
February 9, 2026; 7:00 p.m., ESPN	No. 1	at No. 9 Kansas	L 78–82	23–1 (10–1)	25 – B. Burries	15 – M. Krivas	4 – Tied	Allen Fieldhouse (15,300); Lawrence, KS
February 14, 2026; 4:30 p.m., ESPN	No. 1	No. 16 Texas Tech; College GameDay	L 75–78 ^{OT}	23–2 (10–2)	16 – Tied	12 – T. Awaka	4 – J. Bradley	McKale Center (14,688); Tucson, AZ
February 18, 2026; 7:00 p.m., ESPN	No. 4	No. 23 BYU	W 75–68	24–2 (11–2)	22 – A. Dell’Orso	7 – Tied	10 – J. Bradley	McKale Center (14,688); Tucson, AZ
February 21, 2026; 1:00 p.m., ABC	No. 4	at No. 2 Houston	W 73–66	25–2 (12–2)	22 – A. Dell’Orso	9 – I. Kharchenkov	4 – J. Bradley	Fertitta Center (7,887); Houston, TX
February 24, 2026; 7:00 p.m., ESPN2	No. 2	at Baylor	W 87–80	26–2 (13–2)	25 – J. Bradley	12 – T. Awaka	6 – J. Bradley	Foster Pavilion (7,126); Waco, TX
February 28, 2026; 2:00 p.m., ESPN	No. 2	No. 14 Kansas	W 84–61	27–2 (14–2)	24 – B. Burries	12 – B. Burries	5 – Tied	McKale Center (14,688); Tucson, AZ
March 2, 2026; 7:00 p.m., ESPN	No. 2	No. 6 Iowa State	W 73–57	28–2 (15–2)	17 – J. Bradley	14 – T. Awaka	4 – A. Dell’Orso	McKale Center (14,688); Tucson, AZ
March 7, 2026; 9:00 p.m., ESPN2	No. 2	at Colorado	W 89–79	29–2 (16–2)	31 – B. Burries	7 – Tied	6 – J. Bradley	CU Events Center (8,953); Boulder, CO
Big 12 tournament
March 12, 2026; 12:00 p.m., ESPN	(1) No. 2	vs. (8) UCF; Quarterfinal	W 81–59	30–2	21 – B. Burries	10 – M. Krivas	3 – J. Bradley	T-Mobile Center (14,745); Kansas City, MO
March 13, 2026; 4:00 p.m., ESPN	(1) No. 2	vs. (5) No. 7 Iowa State; Semifinal	W 82–80	31–2	26 – A. Dell’Orso	10 – T. Awaka	7 – J. Bradley	T-Mobile Center (19,450); Kansas City, MO
March 14, 2026; 3:00 p.m., ESPN	(1) No. 2	vs. (2) No. 5 Houston; Championship	W 79–74	32–2	21 – Tied	7 – I. Kharchenkov	3 – B. Burries	T-Mobile Center (11,696); Kansas City, MO
NCAA Tournament
March 20, 2026; 10:35 a.m., TNT	(1 W) No. 2	vs. (16 W) LIU; First round	W 92–58	33–2	18 – B. Burries	9 – I. Kharchenkov	4 – J. Bradley	Viejas Arena (11,418); San Diego, CA
March 22, 2026; 4:50 p.m., truTV	(1 W) No. 2	vs. (9 W) Utah State; Second round	W 78–66	34–2	18 – J. Bradley	14 – M. Krivas	2 – Tied	Viejas Arena (11,501); San Diego, CA
March 26, 2026; 6:45 p.m., CBS	(1 W) No. 2	vs. (4 W) No. 14 Arkansas; Sweet Sixteen	W 109–88	35–2	23 – B. Burries	7 – T. Awaka	5 – Tied	SAP Center (15,341); San Jose, CA
March 28, 2026; 5:49 p.m., TBS/truTV	(1 W) No. 2	vs. (2 W) No. 8 Purdue; Elite Eight	W 79–64	36–2	20 – K. Peat	12 – M. Krivas	6 – J. Bradley	SAP Center (15,854); San Jose, CA
April 4, 2026; 5:49 p.m., TBS/TNT/TruTV/HBO Max	(1 W) No. 2	vs. (1 MW) No. 3 Michigan; Final Four	L 73–91	36–3	16 – K. Peat	11 – K. Peat	1 – Tied	Lucas Oil Stadium (72,111); Indianapolis, IN
*Non-conference game. ^{#}Rankings from AP poll. (#) Tournament seedings in parentheses. W=West. MW=Midwest. All times are in Mountain Standard Time.

== Game summaries ==
This section will be filled in as the season progresses.

=== Exhibition ===
==== Saint Mary's ====
ESPN+

October 18, 2025
2:00 p.m.

Box Score

Saint Mary's Gaels 68, No. 13 Arizona Wildcats 81
Scoring by half: 30–37, 38–44
Pts: Joshua Dent, 14; Rebs: Andrew McKeever, 10; Asts: Mikey Lewis, 3	Pts: Jaden Bradley, 23; Rebs: Motiejus Krivas, 17; Asts: Jaden Bradley, 4

McKale Center, Tucson, AZ
Attendance: 13,328
Referees: Doug Sirmons, Kipp Kissinger, Tony Padilla

==== Embry–Riddle ====
ESPN+

October 27, 2025
7:00 p.m.

Box Score

Embry–Riddle Eagles 42, No. 13 Arizona Wildcats 113
Scoring by half: 26–58, 16–55
Pts: Noah Gifft, 17; Rebs: Tied, 2 Asts: Jacey Canalin, 3	Pts: Ivan Kharchenkov, 17; Rebs: Tobe Awaka, 14; Asts: Evan Nelson, 4

McKale Center, Tucson, AZ
Attendance: 12,558
Referees: Kipp Kissinger, Deldre Carr, De Selle Dean

=== Regular season ===
==== Florida ====
TNT

November 3, 2025
5:00 p.m.

Box Score

No. 3 Florida Gators 87, No. 13 Arizona Wildcats 93
Scoring by half: 46–50, 41–43
Pts: Thomas Haugh, 27; Rebs: Micah Handlogten, 12; Asts: Xavier Lee, 5	Pts: Koa Peat, 30; Rebs: Ivan Kharchenkov, 10; Asts: Tied, 5

T-Mobile Arena, Paradise, NV
Attendance: 16,704
Referees: Keith Kimble, Kipp Kissinger, Bart Lenox

==== Utah Tech ====
TNT

November 7, 2025
7:00 p.m.

Box Score

Utah Tech Trailblazers 67, No. 13 Arizona Wildcats 93
Scoring by half: 37–44, 30–49
Pts: Ethan Potter, 15; Rebs: Tied, 6 Asts: Chance Trujillo, 2	Pts: Tied, 18; Rebs: Tobe Awaka, 18; Asts: Jaden Bradley, 6

McKale Center, Tucson, AZ
Attendance: 14,082
Referees: Marques Pettigrew, Michael Greenstein, Brooks Wells

==== Northern Arizona ====
ESPN+

November 11, 2025
7:00 p.m.

Box Score

Northern Arizona Lumberjacks 49, No. 5 Arizona Wildcats 84
Scoring by half: 17–46, 32–38
Pts: Traivar Jackson, 10; Rebs: Arne Osojnik, 6 Asts: Arne Osojnik, 3	Pts: Dwayne Aristode, 18; Rebs: Tied, 7 Asts: Ivan Kharchenkov, 4

McKale Center, Tucson, AZ
Attendance: 13,740
Referees: Antonio Petty, Chris Pacsi, Christopher Merlo

==== vs UCLA (rivalry) ====
Peacock

November 14, 2025
8:00 p.m.

Box Score

No. 5 Arizona Wildcats 69, No. 15 UCLA Bruins 65
Scoring by half: 28–25, 41–40
Pts: Anthony Dell’Orso, 20; Rebs: Tobe Awaka, 10; Asts: Tied, 3	Pts: Tyler Bilodeau, 19; Rebs: Xavier, Booker, 7 Asts: Donovan Dent, 8

Intuit Dome, Inglewood, CA
Attendance: 7,554
Referees: Jeff Anderson, Byron Jarret, Mike Greenstein

==== at UConn ====
FS1

November 19, 2025
5:00 p.m.

Box Score

No. 4 Arizona Wildcats 71, No. 3 UConn Huskies 67
Scoring by half: 35–33, 36–34
Pts: Jaden Bradley, 21; Rebs: Motiejus Krivas, 14; Asts: Koa Peat, 3	Pts: Eric Reibe, 15; Rebs: Eric Reibe, 4 Asts: Malachi Smith, 8

Gampel Pavilion, Storrs, CT
Attendance: 10,244
Referees: John Gaffney, Ron Groover, Kipp Kissinger

==== Denver ====
CBSSN

November 24, 2025
8:30 p.m.

Box Score

Denver Pioneers 73, No. 2 Arizona Wildcats 103
Scoring by half: 28–56, 45–47
Pts: Carson Johnson, 18; Rebs: Tied, 4 Asts: Julius Rollins, 3	Pts: Tied, 20; Rebs: Tobe Awaka, 15; Asts: Anthony Dell’Orso, 6

McKale Center, Tucson, AZ
Attendance: 13,556
Referees: Kipp Kissinger, Doug Sirmons, Brooks Wells

==== Norfolk State ====
ESPN+

November 29, 2025
2:00 p.m.

Box Score

Norfolk State Spartans 61, No. 2 Arizona Wildcats 98
Scoring by half: 32–47, 29–51
Pts: Anthony McComb, 19; Rebs: Yel Deena, 5 Asts: Tied, 2	Pts: Motiejus Krivas, 20; Rebs: Motiejus Krivas, 9 Asts: Tied, 4

McKale Center, Tucson, AZ
Attendance: 13,461
Referees: Roger Ayers, Marques Pettigrew, Chris Pacsi

==== Auburn ====
ESPN

December 6, 2025
8:00 p.m.

Box Score

No. 20 Auburn Tigers 68, No. 2 Arizona Wildcats 97
Scoring by half: 32–44, 36–53
Pts: Tahaad Pettiford, 30; Rebs: Tahaad Pettiford, 8 Asts: Kevin Overton, 2	Pts: Koa Peat, 18; Rebs: Motiejus Krivas, 9 Asts: Ivan Kharchenkov, 8

McKale Center, Tucson, AZ
Attendance: 14,688
Referees: Doug Sirmons, Tony Padilla, Byron Jarrett

==== vs Alabama (C.M. Newton Classic) ====
ESPN

December 13, 2025
7:30 p.m.

Box Score

No. 1 Arizona Wildcats 96, No. 12 Alabama Crimson Tide 75
Scoring by half: 39–41, 57–34
Pts: Brayden Burries, 28; Rebs: Tobe Awaka, 15; Asts: Jaden Bradley, 7	Pts: Labaron Philon Jr., 24; Rebs: Labaron Philon Jr., 10; Asts: Labaron Philon Jr., 5

Legacy Arena, Birmingham, AL
Attendance: 14,948
Referees: Bart Lenox, K.B. Burdett Jr., Bret Smith

==== Abilene Christian ====
ESPN+

December 16, 2025
7:00 p.m.

Box Score

Abilene Christian Wildcats 62, No. 1 Arizona Wildcats 96
Scoring by half: 31–51, 31–45
Pts: Cbo Newton, 17; Rebs: Cade Hornecker, 5 Asts: Rich Smith, 4	Pts: Brayden Burries, 20; Rebs: Tied, 7 Asts: Jaden Bradley, 4

McKale Center, Tucson, AZ
Attendance: 13,092
Referees: Jeffrey Anderson, Greg Nixon, Randy McCall

==== vs San Diego State ====
ESPN2

December 20, 2025
8:30 p.m.

Box Score

San Diego State Aztecs 45, No. 1 Arizona Wildcats 68
Scoring by half: 27–28, 18–40
Pts: Reese Dixon-Waters, 8 Rebs: Tied, 5 Asts: Tied, 2	Pts: Tied, 11; Rebs: Tobe Awaka, 15; Asts: Jaden Bradley, 3

Mortgage Matchup Center, Phoenix, AZ
Attendance: 10,567
Referees: Steve Anderson, Mike Littlewood, Tyler Kumpf

==== Bethune-Cookman ====
ESPN+

December 22, 2025
7:00 p.m.

Box Score

Bethune-Cookman Wildcats 71, No. 1 Arizona Wildcats 107
Scoring by half: 35–49, 33–54
Pts: Jordan Johnson, 18; Rebs: Quentin Heady, 8 Asts: Tyler Andrews, 4	Pts: Brayden Burries, 20; Rebs: Tobe Awaka, 8 Asts: Jaden Bradley, 5

McKale Center, Tucson, AZ
Attendance: 14,378
Referees: Tony Padilla, Chance Moore, Michael Greenstein

==== South Dakota State ====
ESPN+

December 29, 2025
7:00 p.m.

Box Score

South Dakota State Jackrabbits 72, No. 1 Arizona Wildcats 99
Scoring by half: 35–51, 36–48
Pts: Kalen Garry, 20; Rebs: Matthew Mors, 5 Asts: Bubz Alvarez, 4	Pts: Koa Peat, 19; Rebs: Koa Peat, 14; Asts: Jaden Bradley, 10

McKale Center, Tucson, AZ
Attendance: 14,501
Referees: Greg Nixon, Bret Smith, Tommy Johnson

==== at Utah ====
Peacock

January 3, 2026
2:00 p.m.

Box Score

No. 1 Arizona Wildcats 97, Utah Utes 78
Scoring by half: 58–39, 39–39
Pts: Tied, 18; Rebs: Tobe Awaka, 12; Asts: Jaden Bradley, 5	Pts: Terrence Brown, 26; Rebs: Keanu Dawes, 9 Asts: Terrence Brown, 6

Jon M. Huntsman Center, Salt Lake City, UT
Attendance: 8,339
Referees: Randy McCall, Deron White, Jason Gerretson

==== Kansas State ====
FS1

January 7, 2026
7:00 p.m.

Box Score

Kansas State Wildcats 76, No. 1 Arizona Wildcats 101
Scoring by half: 36–51, 40–50
Pts: PJ Haggerty, 19; Rebs: Taj Manning, 5 Asts: PJ Haggerty, 7	Pts: Brayden Burries, 28; Rebs: Motiejus Krivas, 12; Asts: Jaden Bradley, 5

McKale Center, Tucson, AZ
Attendance: 14,357
Referees: Darron George, Paul Szelc, Deldre Carr

==== at TCU ====
ESPN

January 10, 2026
2:00 p.m.

Box Score

No. 1 Arizona Wildcats 86, TCU Horned Frogs 73
Scoring by half: 43–27, 43–46
Pts: Koa Peat, 20; Rebs: Motiejus Krivas, 10; Asts: Ivan Kharchenkov, 6	Pts: Tanner Toolson, 20; Rebs: David Punch, 8 Asts: Brock Harding, 6

Schollmaier Arena, Fort Worth, TX
Attendance: 6,082
Referees: Kipp Kissinger, Doug Sirmons, Keith Patterson

==== Arizona State (rivalry) ====
FS1

January 14, 2026
8:30 p.m.

Box Score

Arizona State Sun Devils 82, No. 1 Arizona Wildcats 89
Scoring by half: 39–38, 43–51
Pts: Maurice Odum, 23; Rebs: Santiago Trouet, 7 Asts: Maurice Odum, 7	Pts: Tobe Awaka, 25; Rebs: Koa Peat; Asts: Jaden Bradley, 4

McKale Center, Tucson, AZ
Attendance: 14,688
Referees: Randy McCall, Clarence Armstrong, Christopher Merlo

==== at UCF ====
ESPN

January 17, 2026
2:00 p.m.

Box Score

No. 1 Arizona Wildcats 84, UCF Knights 77
Scoring by half: 41–38, 43–39
Pts: Jaden Bradley, 23; Rebs: Motiejus Krivas, 12; Asts: Jaden Bradley, 5	Pts: Themus Fulks, 30; Rebs: Tied, 6 Asts: Themus Fulks, 8

Addition Financial Arena, Orlando, FL
Attendance: 10,000
Referees: Gregory Nixon, Bret Smith, James Ford

==== Cincinnati ====
FS1

January 21, 2026
7:00 p.m.

Box Score

Cincinnati Bearcats 51, No. 1 Arizona Wildcats 77
Scoring by half: 27–33, 24–44
Pts: Baba Miller, 14; Rebs: Baba Miller, 6 Asts: Tied, 2	Pts: Montiejus Krivas, 17; Rebs: Brayden Burries, 10; Asts: Tied, 4

McKale Center, Tucson, AZ
Attendance: 14,380
Referees: Doug Sirmons, DJ Carstensen, Rick Crawford

==== West Virginia ====
CBS

January 24, 2026
12:00 p.m.

Box Score

West Virginia Mountaineers 53, No. 1 Arizona Wildcats 88
Scoring by half: 23–43, 30–45
Pts: Chance Moore, 12; Rebs: Amir Jenkins, 8 Asts: Tied, 2	Pts: Brayden Burries, 22; Rebs: Tobe Awaka, 13; Asts: Brayden Burries, 7

McKale Center, Tucson, AZ
Attendance: 14,688
Referees: Randy McCall, Deldre Carr, Jason Garretson

==== at BYU ====
ESPN

January 26, 2026
7:00 p.m.

Box Score

No. 1 Arizona Wildcats 86, No. 13 BYU Cougars 83
Scoring by half: 44–31, 42–52
Pts: Brayden Burries, 29; Rebs: Montiejus Krivas, 9 Asts: Brayden Burries, 4	Pts: AJ Dybantsa, 24; Rebs: Richie Saunders, 9 Asts: Tied, 5

Marriott Center, Provo, UT
Attendance: 18,239
Referees: Kipp Kissinger, Marques Pettigrew, Tony Padilla

==== at Arizona State (rivalry) ====
TNT

January 31, 2026
12:00 p.m.

Box Score

No. 1 Arizona Wildcats 87, Arizona State Sun Devils 74
Scoring by half: 38–38, 49–36
Pts: Koa Peat, 21; Rebs: Tobe Awaka, 13; Asts: Jaden Bradley, 6	Pts: Noah Meeusen, 16; Rebs: Santiago Trouet, 7 Asts: Noah Meeusen, 5

Desert Financial Arena, Tempe, AZ
Attendance: 13,838
Referees: Kipp Kissinger, Christopher Merlo, Tyler Kumpf

==== Oklahoma State ====
ESPN

February 7, 2026
2:00 p.m.

Box Score

Oklahoma State Cowboys 47, No. 1 Arizona Wildcats 84
Scoring by half: 22–40, 25–44
Pts: Anthony Roy, 10; Rebs: Tied, 5 Asts: Tied, 3	Pts: Brayden Burries, 15; Rebs: Tobe Awaka, 12; Asts: Jaden Bradley, 4

McKale Center, Tucson, AZ
Attendance: 14,688
Referees: Michael Greenstein, Bret Smith, Chance Moore

==== at Kansas ====
ESPN

February 9, 2026
7:00 p.m.

Box Score

No. 1 Arizona Wildcats 78, No. 9 Kansas Jayhawks 82
Scoring by half: 45–42, 33–40
Pts: Brayden Burries, 25; Rebs: Motiejus Krivas, 15; Asts: Tied, 4	Pts: Tied, 23; Rebs: Flory Bidunga, 10; Asts: Melvin Council, 6

Allen Fieldhouse, Lawrence, KS
Attendance: 15,300
Referees: Kipp Kissinger, Doug Sirmons, Tony Padilla

==== Texas Tech ====
ESPN

February 14, 2026
4:30 p.m.

Box Score

No. 16 Texas Tech Red Raiders 78, No. 1 Arizona Wildcats 75 (OT)
Scoring by half: 32–32, 34–34 Overtime: 12–9
Pts: JT Toppin, 31; Rebs: JT Toppin, 13; Asts: Christian Anderson Jr., 8	Pts: Tied, 16; Rebs: Tobe Awaka, 12; Asts: Jaden Bradley, 4

McKale Center, Tucson, AZ
Attendance: 14,688
Referees: Greg Nixon, Brooks Wells, Deron White

==== BYU ====
ESPN

February 18, 2026
7:00 p.m.

Box Score

No. 23 BYU Cougars 68, No. 4 Arizona Wildcats 75
Scoring by half: 35–42, 33–33
Pts: AJ Dybansta, 33; Rebs: Keba Keita, 9 Asts: Robert Wright III, 3	Pts: Anthony Dell’Orso, 22; Rebs: Tied, 7 Asts: Jaden Bradley, 10

McKale Center, Tucson, AZ
Attendance: 14,688
Referees: Kipp Kissinger, Doug Sirmons, Roger Ayers

==== at Houston ====
ABC

February 21, 2026
1:00 p.m.

Box Score

No. 4 Arizona Wildcats 73, No. 2 Houston Cougars 66
Scoring by half: 36–31, 37–35
Pts: Anthony Dell’Orso, 21; Rebs: Ivan Kharchenkov, 9 Asts: Jaden Bradley, 4	Pts: Kingston Flemings, 17; Rebs: Chris Cenac Jr., 13; Asts: Kingston Flemings, 4

Fertitta Center, Houston, TX
Attendance: 7,035
Referees: Gregory Nixon, Randy McCall, Brooks Wells

==== at Baylor ====
ESPN2

February 24, 2026
7:00 p.m.

Box Score

No. 2 Arizona Wildcats 87, Baylor Bears 80
Scoring by half: 34–41, 53–39
Pts: Jaden Bradley, 25; Rebs: Tobe Awaka, 12; Asts: Jaden Bradley, 6	Pts: Cameron Carr, 26; Rebs: Michael Rataj, 7 Asts: Isaac Williams, 5

Foster Pavilion, Waco, TX
Attendance: 7,126
Referees: Doug Sirmons, Doug Shows, Lee Cassell

==== Kansas ====
ESPN

February 28, 2026
2:00 p.m.

Box Score

No. 14 Kansas Jayhawks 61, No. 2 Arizona Wildcats 84
Scoring by half: 28–39, 33–45
Pts: Darryn Peterson, 24; Rebs: Darryn Peterson, 5 Asts: Darryn Peterson, 4	Pts: Brayden Burries, 20; Rebs: Brayden Burries 12; Asts: Tied, 5

McKale Center, Tucson, AZ
Attendance: 14,688
Referees: Kipp Kissinger, Brooks Wells, Chance Moore

==== Iowa State ====
ESPN

March 2, 2026
7:00 p.m.

Box Score

No. 6 Iowa State Cyclones 57, No. 2 Arizona Wildcats 73
Scoring by half: 25–37, 32–36
Pts: Tamin Lipsey, 17; Rebs: Joshua Jefferson, 8 Asts: Tied, 2	Pts: Jaden Bradley, 17; Rebs: Tobe Awaka, 14; Asts: Anthony Dell’Orso, 4

McKale Center, Tucson, AZ
Attendance: 14,688
Referees: Doug Sirmons, Jeffrey Anderson, Roger Ayers

==== at Colorado ====
ESPN2

March 7, 2026
9:00 p.m.

Box Score

No. 2 Arizona Wildcats 89, Colorado Buffaloes 79
Scoring by half: 36–38, 53–41
Pts: Brayden Burries, 31; Rebs: Tied, 7 Asts: Jaden Bradley, 6	Pts: Isiah Johnson, 28; Rebs: Elijah Malone, 8 Asts: Isiah Johnson, 5

CU Events Center, Boulder, CO
Attendance: 8,953
Referees: Deron White, Jason Garretson, Edwin Young

==== Postseason ====
===== UCF (Big 12 Quarterfinals) =====
ESPN

March 12, 2026
12:00 p.m.

Box Score

No. 8 UCF Knights 59, No. 1 Arizona Wildcats 81
Scoring by half: 30–46, 29–35
Pts: Themus Fulks, 14; Rebs: Jamichael Stillwell, 11; Asts: Jamichael Stillwell, 5	Pts: Brayden Burries, 21; Rebs: Motiejus Krivas, 10; Asts: Jaden Bradley, 3

T-Mobile Center, Kansas City, MO
Attendance: 14,745
Referees: Tony Padilla, Michael Greenstein, James Ford

===== Iowa State (Big 12 Semifinals) =====
ESPN

March 13, 2026
4:00 p.m.

Box Score

No. 5 Iowa State Cyclones 80, No. 1 Arizona Wildcats 82
Scoring by half: 43–37, 37–45
Pts: Milan Momcilovic, 28; Rebs: Milan Momcilovic , 5 Asts: Tamin Lipsey, 7	Pts: Anthony Dell’Orso, 28; Rebs: Tobe Awaka, 10; Asts: Jaden Bradley, 7

T-Mobile Center, Kansas City, MO
Attendance: 19,450
Referees: Doug Sirmons, Marques Pettigrew, Gregory Nixon

===== Houston (Big 12 Championship Game) =====
ESPN

March 14, 2026
3:00 p.m.

Box Score

No. 2 Houston Cougars 74, No. 1 Arizona Wildcats 79
Scoring by half: 36–44, 38–35
Pts: Joseph Tugler, 20; Rebs: Joseph Tugler, 10; Asts: Kingston Flemings, 7	Pts: Tied, 21; Rebs: Ivan Kharchenkov, 7 Asts: Braden Burries, 3

T-Mobile Center, Kansas City, MO
Attendance: 11,696
Referees: Kipp Kissinger, Doug Sirmons, Marques Pettigrew

===== LIU (Round of 64) =====
TNT

March 20, 2026
10:35 a.m.

Box Score

No. 16 LIU Sharks 58, No. 1 Arizona Wildcats 92
Scoring by half: 29–53, 26–37
Pts: Mason Porter-Brown, 15; Rebs: Jamal Fuller, 5 Asts: Tied, 3	Pts: Brayden Burries, 18; Rebs: Ivan Kharchenkov, 10; Asts: Jaden Bradley, 4

Viejas Arena, San Diego, CA
Attendance: 11,418
Referees: Steve Divine, Keith Kimble, Bret Smith

===== Utah State (Round of 32) =====
truTV

March 22, 2026
4:50 p.m.

Box Score

No. 9 Utah State Aggies 66, No. 1 Arizona Wildcats 78
Scoring by half: 24–33, 42–45
Pts: Garry Clark, 13; Rebs: Garry Clark, 6 Asts: Tied, 3	Pts: Jaden Bradley, 18; Rebs: Motiejus Krivas, 14; Asts: Tied, 2

Viejas Arena, San Diego, CA
Attendance: 11,501
Referees: Patrick Adams, Pat Driscoll, Chance Moore

===== Arkansas (Sweet Sixteen) =====
CBS

March 26, 2026
6:45 p.m.

Box Score

No. 4 Arkansas Razorbacks 88, No. 1 Arizona Wildcats 109
Scoring by half: 43–54, 45–55
Pts: Darius Acuff, 27; Rebs: Trevon Brazile, 6 Asts: Tied, 3	Pts: Brayden Burries, 23; Rebs: Tobe Awaka, 7 Asts: Tied, 5

SAP Center, San Jose, CA
Attendance: 15,341
Referees: Steve Anderson, Lee Cassell, Kip Kissinger

===== Purdue (Elite Eight) =====
TBS/truTV

March 28, 2026
6:49 p.m.

Box Score

No. 2 Purdue Boilermakers 64, No. 1 Arizona Wildcats 79
Scoring by half: 38–31, 26–48
Pts: Oscar Cluff, 14; Rebs: Oscar Cuff, 10; Asts: Braden Smith, 7	Pts: Koa Peat, 20; Rebs: Motiejus Krivas, 12; Asts: Jaden Bradley, 6

SAP Center, San Jose, CA
Attendance: 15,854
Referees: DJ Carstensen, Michael Greenstein,Joe Lindsay

===== Michigan (Final Four) =====
TBS/TNT/TruTV/HBO Max

April 4, 2026
5:49 p.m.

Box Score

No. 1 Michigan Wolverines 91, No. 1 Arizona Wildcats 73
Scoring by half: 48–32, 43–41
Pts: Aday Mara, 26; Rebs: Aday Mara, 9 Asts: Elliot Cadeau, 10	Pts: Koa Peat, 16; Rebs: Koa Peat, 11; Asts: Tied, 1

Lucas Oil Stadium, Indianapolis, Indiana
Attendance: 72,111
Referees: Keith Kimble, Doug Shows, Doug Sirmons

== Awards and honors ==
Weekly honors
Recipient (position)	Award (Big 12 Conference)	Stats (PPG/RPG/APG)	Week	Date awarded	Ref.
Koa Peat (PF)	Big 12 Player of the Week	24.0 PPG/5.0 RPG/4.0 APG/1.5 SPG/0.5 BPG	Week 1	November 10, 2025	
Koa Peat (PF)	Big 12 Newcomer of the Week	24.0 PPG/5.0 RPG/4.0 APG/1.5 SPG/0.5 BPG	Week 1	November 10, 2025	
Koa Peat (PF)	NCAA Player of the Week	24.0 PPG/5.0 RPG/4.0 APG/1.5 SPG/0.5 BPG	Week 1	November 10, 2025	
Koa Peat (PF)	NCAA Freshman of the Week	24.0 PPG/5.0 RPG/4.0 APG/1.5 SPG/0.5 BPG	Week 1	November 10, 2025	
Koa Peat (PF)	Big 12 Newcomer of the Week	16.0 PPG/12.0 RPG/3.0 APG/2.0 BPG	Week 3	November 24, 2025	
Jaden Bradley	NCAA Player of the Week	21.0 PPG/3.0 RPG/2.0 APG/2.0 SPG	Week 3	November 24, 2025	
Brayden Burries	Big 12 Player & Newcomer of the Week	23.0 PPG/6.0 RPG/4.0 APG/2.5 SPG	Week 13	February 2, 2026	
Brayden Burries	Newcomer of the Week	22.0 PPG/8.5 RPG/4.5 APG/1.0 SPG	Week 17	March 2, 2026	

=== Postseason awards ===
Conference honors
Recipient (position)	Award (Big 12 Conference)	Stats (PPG/RPG/APG)	Ref.
Jaden Bradley (G)	Big 12 Player of the Year	13.4/3.5/4.6	
Tobe Awaka (F)	Big 12 Sixth Man of the Year	9.6/9.5/0.9	
Tommy Lloyd (HC)	Big 12 Coach of the Year	N/A	

==== All Big 12 honors ====
Conference honors
Recipient (position)	Honors (Big 12 Conference)	Stats (PPG/RPG/APG)	Ref.
Jaden Bradley (G)	Big 12 First Team	13.4/3.5/4.6	
Jaden Bradley (G)	Big 12 Defensive Team	13.4/3.5/4.6	
Jaden Bradley (G)	Big 12 Most Outstanding Player	13.4/3.5/4.6	
Jaden Bradley (G)	Big 12 Men's Basketball All-Tournament team	13.4/3.5/4.6	
Motiejus Krivas (C)	Big 12 First Team	10.8/8.2/1.0	
Motiejus Krivas (C)	Big 12 Defensive Team	10.8/8.2/1.0	
Brayden Burries (G)	Big 12 First Team	16.0/5.0/2.6	
Brayden Burries (G)	Big 12 Freshman Team	16.0/5.0/2.6	
Brayden Burries (G)	Big 12 Men's Basketball All-Tournament team	16.0/5.0/2.6	
Koa Peat (F)	Big 12 Third Team	13.8/5.3/2.7	
Koa Peat (F)	Big 12 Freshman Team	13.8/5.3/2.7	
Tobe Awaka (F)	Big 12 Honorable mention	9.6/9.5/0.9	

=== Final awards watchlists ===
Final award honors
Honors	Player	Position	Ref.
Bob Cousy Award	Jaden Bradley	PG	
Jerry West Award	Brayden Burries	SG	

==== National awards ====
National award honors
Honors	Player	Position	Ref.
Sporting News Coach of the Year Award	Tommy Lloyd	Coach	
NABC, Sporting News & USBWA Third Team All-America	Jaden Bradley	G	
NCAA Tournament Most Outstanding Player (West Region)	Koa Peat	F	
NCAA Tournament All-Tournament team	Jaden Bradley	G	

== Rankings ==
Ranking movements Legend: ██ Increase in ranking ██ Decrease in ranking ( ) = First-place votes
	Week																				
Poll	Pre	1	2	3	4	5	6	7	8	9	10	11	12	13	14	15	16	17	18	19	Final
AP	13	5	4 (2)	2 (11)	2 (6)	1 (33)	1 (42)	1 (38)	1 (38)	1 (32)	1 (60)	1 (61)	1 (60)	1 (59)	1 (59)	4	2 (5)	2 (4)	2 (4)	2 (2)	3
Coaches	13	6	5	3 (5)	3 (3)	2 (11)	2 (14)	2 (11)	2 (11)	2 (7)	1 (29)	1 (31)	1 (31)	1 (31)	1 (30)	4	2 (4)	2 (3)	2 (3)	2 (5)	3

== See also ==
- 2025–26 Arizona Wildcats women's basketball team
