= 2024–25 Arizona Wildcats men's basketball team =

American college basketball season

2024–25 Arizona Wildcats men's basketball

NCAA tournament, Sweet Sixteen
- Conference: Big 12 Conference

Ranking
- Coaches: No. 13
- AP: No. 15
- Record: 24–13 (14–6 Big 12)
- Head coach: Tommy Lloyd (4th season)
- Associate head coach: Jack Murphy (6th season)
- Assistant coaches: Steve Robinson (4th season); TJ Benson (1st season); Ken Nakagawa (1st season); Rem Bakamus (1st season)
- Home arena: McKale Center

2024–25 Big 12 men's basketball standings
	Conf.				Overall
Team	W		L	PCT	W		L	PCT
No. 2 Houston †	19	–	1	.950	35	–	5	.875
No. 8 Texas Tech	15	–	5	.750	28	–	9	.757
No. 15 Arizona	14	–	6	.700	24	–	13	.649
No. 13 BYU	14	–	6	.700	26	–	10	.722
No. 17 Iowa State	13	–	7	.650	25	–	10	.714
Kansas	11	–	9	.550	21	–	13	.618
Baylor	10	–	10	.500	20	–	15	.571
West Virginia	10	–	10	.500	19	–	13	.594
TCU	9	–	11	.450	16	–	16	.500
Kansas State	9	–	11	.450	16	–	17	.485
Utah	8	–	12	.400	16	–	17	.485
Oklahoma State	7	–	13	.350	17	–	18	.486
Cincinnati	7	–	13	.350	19	–	16	.543
UCF	7	–	13	.350	20	–	17	.541
Arizona State	4	–	16	.200	13	–	20	.394
Colorado	3	–	17	.150	14	–	21	.400
† 2025 Big 12 tournament winner Rankings from AP poll

The 2024–25 Arizona Wildcats men's basketball team represented the University of Arizona during the 2024–25 NCAA Division I men's basketball season. The team was led by Tommy Lloyd in his fourth season as head coach. The season marked the Wildcats' 51st season at McKale Center in Tucson, Arizona, and their first season as members of the Big 12 Conference.

The Arizona Wildcats drew an average home attendance of 14,058, the 18th-highest of all college basketball teams.

== Previous season ==
The Wildcats finished the 2023–24 season 27–9, 15–5 in Pac-12 Conference play, winning their 18th and final Pac-12 regular season title and overall 1 seed in the Pac-12 tournament. They lost their semifinal match up against eventual tournament champion Oregon 75–68. The Wildcats were invited to their 34th NCAA tournament appearance, receiving the number 2 seed in the West Regional. They lost in the Sweet Sixteen to number 6 seed Clemson 77–72.

== Offseason ==
=== Coaching staff changes ===
Former assistant coach Riccardo Fois accepted an assistant coaching job with the Sacramento Kings in the NBA. TJ Benson was promoted to assistant coach after spending the previous three seasons as a Special Assistant to the Head Coach/Recruiting Coordinator for the program. Ken Nakagawa was promoted to assistant coach after spending the previous three seasons as the Director of Advanced Scouting. Rem Bakamus was promoted to assistant coach after spending the previous three seasons as the Director of Player Development.

=== Departures ===
Due to COVID-19, the NCAA ruled in October 2020 that the 2020–21 season would not count against the eligibility of any basketball player, thus giving all players the option to return in 2022–23. Additionally, any players who have declared for the 2024 NBA draft—including seniors, who must opt into this year's draft—have the option to return if they make a timely withdrawal from the draft and end any pre-draft relationships with agents. Thus, separate lists will initially be maintained for confirmed and potential departures.

Arizona Wildcats departures
Name	Number	Pos.	Height	Weight	Year	Hometown	Reason
Dylan Anderson	44	F	7'0"	240 lb	Jr	Gilbert, AZ	Transferred to Boise State
Oumar Ballo	11	C	7'0"	260 lb	(redshirt) Sr	Koulikoro, Mali	Transferred to Indiana
Filip Borovićanin	1	G	6'9"	225 lb	Jr	Belgrade, Serbia	Transferred to New Mexico
Kylan Boswell	4	G	6'2"	200 lb	Jr	Champaign, IL	Transferred to Illinois
Keshad Johnson	16	F	6'7"	225 lb	GS	Oakland, CA	Out of eligibility
Pelle Larsson	3	G	6'6"	215 lb	Sr	Nacka, Sweden	Declared for NBA Draft
Paulius Murauskas	23	F	6'8"	225 lb	So	Kaunas, Lithuania	Transferred to Saint Mary's

=== Acquisitions ===
Arizona Wildcats Arrivals
Name	Number	Pos.	Height	Weight	Year	Hometown	Reason
Tobe Awaka	30	F	6'8"	250 lb	Jr	Hyde Park, NY	Transfer from Tennessee
Addison Arnold	2	G	6'3"	190 lb	Fr	Simi Valley, CA	walk-on
Anthony Dell’Orso	3	G	6'6"	190 lb	Jr	Melbourne, Australia	Transfer from Campbell
Sven Djopmo	42	G	6'2"	175	Fr	Reims, France	walk-on
Jackson Francois	8	G	6'5"	160 lb	Jr	Las Vegas, NV	Transfer from Missouri (walk-on)
Liam Lloyd	11	G	6'5"	190 lb	Sr	Spokane, WA	Transfer from Northern Arizona
Trey Townsend	4	F	6'6"	230 lb	Sr	Oxford, MI	Transfer from Oakland

=== Recruiting classes ===
==== 2024 recruiting class ====
College recruiting
Name	Hometown	School	Height	Weight	Commit date
Carter Bryant; Power forward	Newport Beach, CA	Corona Centennial High School	6 ft 8 in (2.03 m)	225 lb (102 kg)	Apr 26, 2023
Carter Bryant; Power forward	Recruit ratings: Rivals: 247Sports: ESPN: (89)				
Emmanuel Stephen; Center	Lagos, Nigeria	Dream City Christian (AZ)	6 ft 9 in (2.06 m)	220 lb (100 kg)	Sep 3, 2023
Emmanuel Stephen; Center	Recruit ratings: Rivals: 247Sports: ESPN: (82)				
Overall recruit ranking:
Note: In many cases, Scout, Rivals, 247Sports, On3, and ESPN may conflict in their listings of height and weight.; In these cases, the average was taken. ESPN grades are on a 100-point scale.; Sources: "Arizona 2024 Basketball Commitments". Rivals.; "2024 Arizona Wildcats Recruiting Class". ESPN.; "2024 Team Ranking". Rivals.; "2024 Arizona 24/7 Sports Commits". 247Sports.

2024 overall class rankings

Website	National rank	Conference rank	5-star recruits	4-star recruits	Total
ESPN	--	--	0	3	3
On3 Recruits	6	2	--	3	3
Rivals	3	3	0	3	3
247 Sports	3	1	--	3	3

*ESPN has not made 2024 recruiting class rankings yet.

=== Red and Blue game ===
Arizona announced on August 20, 2024 that the Wildcat cats would host their annual Red-Blue Game at the McKale Center on October 4, 2024. Richard Jefferson and Channing Frye are serving as the hosts for the game for the second year in a row. The game is being streamed on ESPN+. The night began with a three-point contest featuring Carter Bryant, Anthony Dell'Orso, Liam Lloyd and Caleb Love. Dell'Orso and Love made the finals with Love winning the shootout making 17 of 25 three pointers. The second event of the night featured a dunk contest featureTobe Awaka, Jaden Bradley, Carter Bryant and KJ Lewis. Bryant and Lewis advanced to the finals with Carter Bryant winning with a total score of 59 points out of 60. The dunk contest was judged by Jefferson, Frye and former player Corey Williams.

The night ended with the team splitting into two squads, Team Blue & Team Red. Team Red defeated Team Blue, 47–44. Caleb Love lead all scorers with 19 points, followed by Anthony Dell'Orso on Team Blue with 15 points.

== Preseason ==
Big 12 Preseason Poll

	Big 12 Coaches	Points
1.	Kansas	215 (9)
2.	Houston	211 (5)
3.	Iowa State	194 (1)
4.	Baylor	185
5.	Arizona	179 (1)
6.	Cincinnati	140
7.	Texas Tech	135
8.	Kansas State	133
9.	BYU	116
10.	TCU	90
11.	UCF	83
12.	Arizona State	64
13.	West Virginia	62
14.	Oklahoma State	46
15.	Colorado	37
16.	Utah	30
Reference: (#) first-place votes

Pre-Season All-Big 12 Team

First Team

Player	School
Caleb Love	Arizona
LJ Cryer	Houston
J’Wan Roberts	Houston
Tamin Lipsey	Iowa State
Hunter Dickinson†	Kansas
† denotes unanimous selection Reference:

Second Team

Player	School
Norchad Omier	Baylor
Jeremy Roach	Baylor
Keshon Gilbert	Iowa State
Dajuan Harris Jr	Kansas
Coleman Hawkins	Kansas State
† denotes unanimous selection Reference:

- Player of the Year: Hunter Dickinson, Kansas
- Co-Newcomer of the Year: Jeremy Roach, Baylor & Coleman Hawkins, Kansas State
- Freshman of the Year: V. J. Edgecombe, Baylor

=== Award watch lists ===
Listed in the order that they were released

Award	Player	Position	Year	Source
Jerry West Award	Caleb Love	SG	Gr.	
Naismith College Player of the Year	Caleb Love	SG	Gr.	
John R. Wooden Award	Caleb Love	SG	Gr.	
Oscar Robertson Award	Caleb Love	SG	Gr.	
Julius Erving Award	KJ Lewis	SF	So.	
Karl Malone Award	Trey Townsend	PF	Gr.	
Kareem Abdul-Jabbar Award	Motiejus Krivas	C	So.	

== Personnel ==
=== Roster ===
Roster below is based on the 2024–25 roster with outgoing players removed and incoming players added. The roster will undergo multiple changes as players leave via the NBA draft or transfers and players are added via the transfer portal and recruiting.

2024–25 Arizona Wildcats men's basketball team
Players
Coaches

Pos.	#	Name	Height	Weight	Year	Previous school	Hometown
G	0	Jaden Bradley	6 ft 3 in (1.91 m)	200 lb (91 kg)	Jr	Alabama	Rochester, NY
G	1	Caleb Love	6 ft 4 in (1.93 m)	205 lb (93 kg)	GS	North Carolina	St. Louis, MO
G	2	Addison Arnold (W)	6 ft 3 in (1.91 m)	190 lb (86 kg)	Fr	Royal HS	Simi Valley, CA
G	3	Anthony Dell'Orso	6 ft 6 in (1.98 m)	190 lb (86 kg)	Jr	Campbell	Melbourne, Australia
F	4	Trey Townsend	6 ft 6 in (1.98 m)	220 lb (100 kg)	Sr	Oakland	Oxford, MI
G	5	KJ Lewis	6 ft 4 in (1.93 m)	205 lb (93 kg)	So	Duncanville HS	El Paso, TX
G	8	Jackson Francois (W)	6 ft 5 in (1.96 m)	160 lb (73 kg)	Jr	Missouri	Las Vegas, NV
F	9	Carter Bryant	6 ft 8 in (2.03 m)	220 lb (100 kg)	Fr	Centennial HS	Corona, CA
G	11	Liam Lloyd (W)	6 ft 5 in (1.96 m)	190 lb (86 kg)	Sr	Northern Arizona	Spokane, WA
G	12	Will Kuykendall (W)	6 ft 3 in (1.91 m)	175 lb (79 kg)	RS Fr	St Joseph HS	Santa Maria, CA
F	13	Henri Veesaar	7 ft 0 in (2.13 m)	225 lb (102 kg)	RS So	Real Madrid	Tallinn, Estonia
C	14	Motiejus Krivas (injured)	7 ft 2 in (2.18 m)	260 lb (118 kg)	So	Kaunas Zalgiris II	Šiauliai, Lithuania
G	15	Grant Weitman	6 ft 4 in (1.93 m)	205 lb (93 kg)	GS	Salpointe Catholic HS	Tucson, AZ
G	21	Jackson Cook (W)	6 ft 3 in (1.91 m)	175 lb (79 kg)	RS Fr	Montverde Academy (FL)	Oxford, England
F	24	Luke Champion	6 ft 8 in (2.03 m)	205 lb (93 kg)	GS	Missouri Western State	Suwanee, GA
F	30	Tobe Awaka	6 ft 8 in (2.03 m)	250 lb (113 kg)	Jr	Tennessee	Hyde Park, NY
F	33	Will Menaugh (W)	6 ft 10 in (2.08 m)	245 lb (111 kg)	Sr	Catalina Foothills HS	Tucson, AZ
C	34	Emmanuel Stephen	7 ft 0 in (2.13 m)	260 lb (118 kg)	Fr	Dream City Christian (AZ)	Lagos, Nigeria
G	42	Sven Djopmo (W)	6 ft 2 in (1.88 m)	175 lb (79 kg)	Fr	Nanterre 92	Reims, France
G	55	Conrad Martinez	6 ft 0 in (1.83 m)	165 lb (75 kg)	So	Joventut Badalona	Granollers, Spain

Head coach

- Tommy Lloyd (Whitman)

Assistant coach(es)

- Jack Murphy (Arizona)
- Rem Bakamus (Gonzaga)
- TJ Benson (Grand Canyon)
- Ken Nakagawa (Long Beach State)
- Steve Robinson (Radford)

Legend

- (C) Team captain
- (S) Suspended
- (I) Ineligible
- (W) Walk-on
- Injured
- Current redshirt

Roster

Note: Players' year is based on remaining eligibility. The NCAA did not count the 2020–21 season towards eligibility.

=== Depth chart ===
Pos.	Starting 5	Bench 1	Bench 2	Bench 3
C	Tobe Awaka	Motiejus Krivas (+)	Emmanuel Stephen	Will Menaugh
PF	Trey Townsend	Henri Veesaar	Luke Champion	Jackson Francois
SF	K.J. Lewis	Carter Bryant	Grant Wietman	Jackson Cook
SG	Caleb Love	Anthony Dell'Orso	Liam Llyod	Will Kuykendall
PG	Jaden Bradley	Conrad Martinez	Addison Arnold	Sven Djopmo

== Schedule ==
The Wildcats non-conference schedule was announced on September 9, 2024. Arizona has confirmed games against Duke at McKale Center, Wisconsin in Madison, and has been confirmed to play in the 2024 Battle 4 Atlantis, which includes Gonzaga, Indiana, Louisville, Providence, West Virginia, Oklahoma and Davidson. Due to the tournament format, Arizona will be guaranteed one game in the 2025 Big 12 tournament.

Date time, TV	Rank^{#}	Opponent^{#}	Result	Record	High points	High rebounds	High assists	Site (attendance) city, state
Exhibition
October 21, 2024*; 7:00 p.m., ESPN+	No. 10	Eastern New Mexico	W 117–54	–	24 – T. Townsend	15 – T. Awaka	5 – T. Townsend	McKale Center (13,157); Tucson, AZ
October 28, 2024*; 7:00 p.m., ESPN+	No. 10	Point Loma	W 113–64	–	18 – T. Townsend	10 – T. Townsend	5 – J. Bradley	McKale Center (13,240); Tucson, AZ
Non-conference regular season
November 4, 2024*; 8:00 p.m., ESPN+	No. 10	Canisius	W 93–64	1–0	17 – C. Love	9 – T. Awaka	6 – C. Love	McKale Center (13,597); Tucson, AZ
November 9, 2024*; 2:00 p.m., ESPN+	No. 10	Old Dominion	W 102–44	2–0	18 – T. Awaka	15 – T. Awaka	4 – C. Martinez	McKale Center (13,982); Tucson, AZ
November 15, 2024*; 7:00 p.m., Peacock	No. 9	at Wisconsin	L 88–103	2–1	22 – J. Bradley	13 – T. Awaka	2 – Tied	Kohl Center (16,838); Madison, WI
November 22, 2024*; 8:30 p.m., ESPN2	No. 17	No. 12 Duke	L 55–69	2–2	18 – J. Bradley	7 – T. Townsend	5 – M. Krivas	McKale Center (14,634); Tucson, AZ
November 27, 2024*; 5:30 p.m., ESPN2	No. 24	vs. Davidson; Battle 4 Atlantis quarterfinals	W 104–72	3–2	21 – A. Dell’Orso	10 – Tied	4 – Tied	Imperial Arena (1,737); Paradise Island, Bahamas
November 28, 2024*; 3:00 p.m., ESPN	No. 24	vs. Oklahoma; Battle 4 Atlantis Semifinal	L 77–82	3–3	17 – C. Love	5 – Tied	3 – Tied	Imperial Arena (456); Paradise Island, Bahamas
November 29, 2024*; 3:00 p.m., ESPN2	No. 24	vs. West Virginia; Battle 4 Atlantis 3rd place game	L 76–83 ^{OT}	3–4	24 – C. Love	8 – T. Awaka	5 – J. Bradley	Imperial Arena (796); Paradise Island, Bahamas
December 7, 2024*; 12:00 p.m., CBSSN		Southern Utah	W 102–66	4–4	19 – A. Dell’Orso	9 – C. Bryant	5 – K. Lewis	McKale Center (13,747); Tucson, AZ
December 14, 2024*; 1:00 p.m., ESPN2		vs. No. 24 UCLA; Rivalry	L 54–57	4–5	12 – J. Bradley	7 – Tied	6 – J. Bradley	Footprint Center (8,437); Phoenix, AZ
December 18, 2024*; 7:00 p.m., ESPN+		Samford	W 96–64	5–5	23 – C. Love	8 – T. Townsend	8 – J. Bradley	McKale Center (12,847); Tucson, AZ
December 21, 2024*; 2:00 p.m., ESPN+		Central Michigan	W 94–41	6–5	24 – C. Love	10 – T. Awaka	5 – Tied	McKale Center (13,093); Tucson, AZ
Big 12 regular season
December 30, 2024; 6:00 p.m., ESPN+		TCU	W 90–81	7–5 (1–0)	33 – C. Love	7 – C. Love	8 – K. Lewis	McKale Center (13,560); Tucson, AZ
January 4, 2025; 12:30 p.m., ESPN2		at No. 16 Cincinnati	W 72–67	8–5 (2–0)	15 – J. Bradley	8 – H. Veesaar	4 – H. Veesaar	Fifth Third Arena (11,212); Cincinnati, OH
January 7, 2025; 5:00 p.m., ESPN+		at No. 21 West Virginia	W 75–56	9–5 (3–0)	21 – K. Lewis	7 – Tied	5 – J. Bradley	WVU Coliseum (10,566); Morgantown, WV
January 11, 2025; 8:00 p.m., ESPN		UCF	W 88–80	10–5 (4–0)	16 – C. Love	8 – C. Love	6 – C. Love	McKale Center (13,039); Tucson, AZ
January 14, 2025; 9:00 p.m., ESPN		No. 25 Baylor	W 81–70	11–5 (5–0)	19 – H. Veesaar	7 – H. Veesaar	7 – K. Lewis	McKale Center (14,034); Tucson, AZ
January 18, 2025; 12:00 p.m., ESPN2		at Texas Tech	L 54–70	11–6 (5–1)	11 – J. Bradley	14 – T. Awaka	3 – J. Bradley	United Supermarkets Arena (15,098); Lubbock, TX
January 21, 2025; 9:00 p.m., ESPNU		at Oklahoma State	W 92–78	12–6 (6–1)	27 – C. Love	7 – T. Awaka	4 – J. Bradley	Gallagher-Iba Arena (6,355); Stillwater, OK
January 25, 2025; 1:00 p.m., ESPN+		Colorado	W 78–63	13–6 (7–1)	20 – A. Dell’Orso	15 – T. Awaka	6 – Tied	McKale Center (14,688); Tucson, AZ
January 27, 2025; 8:30 p.m., ESPN		No. 3 Iowa State	W 86–75 ^{OT}	14–6 (8–1)	25 – C. Love	12 – T. Awaka	6 – Tied	McKale Center (14,688); Tucson, AZ
February 1, 2025; 11:00 a.m., CBS		at Arizona State; Rivalry	W 81–72	15–6 (9–1)	27 – C. Love	10 – C. Bryant	7 – C. Love	Desert Financial Arena (13,544); Tempe, AZ
February 4, 2025; 9:00 p.m., ESPN	No. 20	at BYU	W 85–74	16–6 (10–1)	18 – C. Love	9 – T. Awaka	5 – K. Lewis	Marriott Center (17,274); Provo, UT
February 8, 2025; 8:30 p.m., ESPN	No. 20	No. 13 Texas Tech	W 82–73	17–6 (11–1)	16 – Tied	11 – T. Awaka	6 – C. Love	McKale Center (14,688); Tucson, AZ
February 11, 2025; 6:00 p.m., ESPN+	No. 13	at Kansas State	L 70–73	17–7 (11–2)	15 – K. Lewis	11 – C. Bryant	4 – J. Bradley	Bramlage Coliseum (8,914); Manhattan, KS
February 15, 2025; 12:00 p.m., ESPN	No. 13	No. 6 Houston	L 58–62	17–8 (11–3)	17 – C. Love	6 – Tied	7 – C. Love	McKale Center (14,688); Tucson, AZ
February 17, 2025; 8:00 p.m., ESPN	No. 19	at Baylor	W 74–67	18–8 (12–3)	14 – T. Awaka	12 – T. Awaka	6 – C. Bryant	Foster Pavilion (7,500); Waco, TX
February 22, 2025; 8:00 p.m., ESPN	No. 19	BYU	L 95–96	18–9 (12–4)	27 – C. Love	10 – T. Awaka	5 – Tied	McKale Center (14,688); Tucson, AZ
February 26, 2025; 7:00 p.m., ESPN+	No. 22	Utah	W 83–66	19–9 (13–4)	23 – C. Love	10 – T. Awaka	7 – C. Love	McKale Center (14,264); Tucson, AZ
March 1, 2025; 7:00 p.m., ESPN	No. 22	at No. 9 Iowa State	L 67–84	19–10 (13–5)	18 – J. Bradley	6 – Tied	3 – C. Love	Hilton Coliseum (14,267); Ames, IA
March 4, 2025; 9:00 p.m., ESPN	No. 24	Arizona State; Rivalry	W 113–100	20–10 (14–5)	22 – H. Veesaar	9 – T. Awaka	7 – J. Bradley	McKale Center (14,688); Tucson, AZ
March 8, 2025; 2:30 p.m., ESPN	No. 24	at Kansas	L 76–83	20–11 (14–6)	21 – J. Bradley	7 – T. Townsend	3 – C. Love	Allen Fieldhouse (15,300); Lawrence, KS
Big 12 tournament
March 13, 2025; 6:30 p.m., ESPN	(3)	vs. (6) Kansas; Quarterfinals	W 88–77	21–11	19 – Tied	5 – Tied	6 – C. Love	T-Mobile Center (15,491); Kansas City, MO
March 14, 2025; 6:30 p.m., ESPN2	(3)	vs. (2) No. 9 Texas Tech; Semifinals	W 86–80	22–11	27 – C. Love	8 – K. Lewis	6 – K. Lewis	T-Mobile Center (13,946); Kansas City, MO
March 16, 2025; 3:00 p.m., ESPN	(3)	vs. (1) No. 2 Houston; Championship	L 64–72	22–12	19 – C. Love	9 – T. Awaka	2 – J. Bradley	T-Mobile Center (13,768); Kansas City, MO
NCAA tournament
March 21, 2025*; 4:35 p.m., TruTV	(4 E) No. 21	vs. (13 E) Akron; First Round	W 93–65	23–12	19 – J. Bradley	8 – T. Townsend	5 – A. Dell’Orso	Climate Pledge Arena (16,978); Seattle, WA
March 23, 2025*; 6:40 p.m., TBS	(4 E) No. 21	vs. (5 E) No. 25 Oregon; Second Round	W 87–83	24–12	29 – C. Love	14 – T. Awake	4 – Tied	Climate Pledge Arena (17,102); Seattle, WA
March 27, 2025; 6:39 p.m., CBS	(4 E) No. 21	vs. (1 E) No. 1 Duke; Sweet Sixteen	L 93–100	24–13	35 – C. Love	6 – H. Veesaar	5 – J. Bradley	Prudential Center (18,617); Newark, NJ
*Non-conference game. ^{#}Rankings from AP poll. (#) Tournament seedings in parentheses. East=. All times are in Mountain Time.

== Game summaries ==
This section will be filled in as the season progresses.

=== Eastern New Mexico (exhibition) ===
ESPN+

October 21, 2024
7:00 p.m.

Box Score

Eastern New Mexico 54, No. 10 Arizona Wildcats 117
Scoring by half: 26–64, 28–53
Pts: Cougar Downing, 11; Rebs: Tied, 3 Asts: Kevin Rankin, 3	Pts: Trey Townsend, 24; Rebs: Tobe Awaka, 15; Asts: Trey Townsend, 5

McKale Center, Tucson, AZ
Attendance: 13,157
Referees: Jason Garretson, D.G. Nelson, Michael Greenstein

=== Point Loma (exhibition) ===
ESPN+

October 28, 2024
7:00 p.m.

Box Score

Point Loma 64, No. 10 Arizona Wildcats 113
Scoring by half: 45–59, 19–54
Pts: Zackry Paulsen, 15; Rebs: Jaden Matingou, 5 Asts: Jaden Matingou, 4	Pts: Trey Townsend, 18; Rebs: Trey Townsend, 10; Asts: Jaden Bradley, 5

McKale Center, Tucson, AZ
Attendance: 13,240
Referees: Deron White, Marques Pettigrew, Tony Padilla

=== Canisius ===
ESPN+

November 4, 2024
8:00 p.m.

Box Score

Canisius Golden Griffins 64, No. 10 Arizona Wildcats 93
Scoring by half: 30–52, 34–41
Pts: Paul McMillan, 20; Rebs: Cam Palesse, 5 Asts: Tied, 3	Pts: Caleb Love, 17; Rebs: Tobe Awaka, 9 Asts: Caleb Love, 6

McKale Center, Tucson, AZ
Attendance: 13,597
Referees: Michael Greenstein, Jason Garrettson, De Selle Dean

=== Old Dominion ===
ESPN+

November 9, 2024
2:00 p.m.

Box Score

Old Dominion Monarchs 44, No. 10 Arizona Wildcats 102
Scoring by half: 21–50, 23–52
Pts: Devin Ceaser, 12; Rebs: Tied, 4 Asts: Tied, 1	Pts: Tobe Awaka, 18; Rebs: Tobe Awaka, 15; Asts: Conrad Martinez, 4

McKale Center, Tucson, AZ
Attendance: 13,982
Referees: Ray Natilli, Rick Crawford, Lee Cassell

=== at Wisconsin ===
Peacock

November 15, 2024
7:00 p.m.

Box Score

No. 9 Arizona Wildcats 88, Wisconsin Badgers 103
Scoring by half: 44–55, 44–48
Pts: Jaden Bradley, 22; Rebs: Tobe Awaka, 13; Asts: Tied, 2	Pts: John Tonje, 41; Rebs: John Tonje, 6 Asts: Steven Crowl, 6

Kohl Center, Madison, WI
Attendance: 16,838
Referees: Larry Scirotto, Jason Phillips, Rob Riley Sr.

=== Duke ===
ESPN2

November 22, 2024
8:30 p.m.

Box Score

No. 12 Duke Blue Devils 69, No. 17 Arizona Wildcats 55
Scoring by half: 34–27, 35–28
Pts: Cooper Flagg, 24; Rebs: Tied, 7 Asts: Tyrese Proctor, 4	Pts: Jaden Bradley, 18; Rebs: Trey Townsend, 7 Asts: Motiejus Krivas, 5

McKale Center, Tucson, AZ
Attendance: 14,634
Referees: Doug Sirmons, Marques Pettigrew, Roger Ayers

=== vs Davidson (Battle 4 Atlantis) ===
ESPN2

November 27, 2024
5:30 p.m.

Score

Davidson Wildcats 71, No. 24 Arizona Wildcats 104
Scoring by half: 37–49, 34–55
Pts: Connor Kochera, 20; Rebs: Bobby Durkin, 6 Asts: Bobby Durkin, 5	Pts: Anthony Dell’Orso, 21; Rebs: Tied, 10; Asts: Tied, 4

Imperial Arena, Paradise Island, Bahamas
Attendance: 1,737
Referees: Tony Padilla, Darron George, Isaac Barnett

=== vs Oklahoma (Battle 4 Atlantis Semifinal) ===
ESPN

November 28, 2024
3:00 p.m.

Box Score

Oklahoma Sooners 82, No. 24 Arizona Wildcats 77
Scoring by half: 36–30, 46–47
Pts: Jeremiah Fears, 26; Rebs: Jalon Moore, 7 Asts: Jeremiah Fears, 5	Pts: Caleb Love, 17; Rebs: Tied, 5 Asts: Tied, 3

Imperial Arena, Paradise Island, Bahamas
Attendance: 456
Referees: Mike Roberts, Bret Smith, Chris Merlo

=== vs West Virginia (Battle 4 Atlantis 3rd place game) ===
ESPN2

November 29, 2024
1:00 p.m.

Box Score

West Virginia Mountaineers 83, No. 24 Arizona Wildcats 77 (OT)
Scoring by half: 39–37, 27–29 Overtime: 17–10
Pts: Tucker DeVries, 26; Rebs: Amani Hansberry, 10; Asts: Jagon Small, 8	Pts: Caleb Love, 24; Rebs: Tobe Awaka, 8 Asts: Jaden Bradley, 5

Imperial Arena, Paradise Island, Bahamas
Attendance: 796
Referees: Chris Pacsi, Bret Smith, Gary Maxwell

=== Southern Utah ===
CBSSN

December 7, 2024
12:00 p.m.

Box Score

Southern Utah Thunderbirds 66, Arizona Wildcats 102
Scoring by half: 23–55, 43–47
Pts: Jamir Simpson, 21; Rebs: Jamir Simpson, 7 Asts: Jamir Simpson, 4	Pts: Anthony Dell, Orso, 19; Rebs: Carter Bryant, 9 Asts: KJ Lewis, 5

McKale Center, Tucson, AZ
Attendance: 13,747
Referees: Michael Greenstein, Mark Fulton, De Selle Dean

=== vs UCLA (Rivalry) ===
ESPN2

December 14, 2024
1:00 p.m.

Box Score

No. 24 UCLA Bruins 57, Arizona Wildcats 54
Scoring by half: 30–28, 27–26
Pts: Tyler Bilodeau, 17; Rebs: Kobe Johnson, 7 Asts: Kobe Johnson, 4	Pts: Jaden Bradley, 12; Rebs: Tied, 7 Asts: Jaden Bradley, 6

Footprint Center, Phoenix, AZ
Attendance: 8,437
Referees: Randy Richardson, Kipp Kissinger, Tony Padilla

=== Samford ===
ESPN+

December 18, 2024
7:00 p.m.

Box Score

Samford Bulldogs 64, Arizona Wildcats 96
Scoring by half: 33–55, 29–41
Pts: Jaden Brownwell, 13; Rebs: Rylan Jones, 5 Asts: Rylan Jones, 5	Pts: Caleb Love, 23; Rebs: Trey Townsend, 8 Asts: Jaden Bradley, 6

McKale Center, Tucson, AZ
Attendance: 12,847
Referees: Jeffrey Anderson, Bret Smith, Chance Moore

=== Central Michigan ===
ESPN+

December 21, 2024
2:00 p.m.

Box Score

Central Michigan Chippewas 41, Arizona Wildcats 94
Scoring by half: 23–44, 18–50
Pts: Cayden Vasko, 10; Rebs: Bryan Ndjonga, 8 Asts: Tied, 2	Pts: Caleb Love, 24; Rebs: Tobe Awaka, 10; Asts: Tied, 5

McKale Center, Tucson, AZ
Attendance: 13,093
Referees: Ray Natili, Tyler Kumpf, Frank Harvey III

=== TCU ===
ESPN+

December 30, 2024
6:00 p.m.

Box Score

TCU Horned Frogs 81, Arizona Wildcats 90
Scoring by half: 37–41, 44–49
Pts: Noah Reynold, 23; Rebs: Ernest Udeh, 14; Asts: Noah Reynolds, 7	Pts: Caleb Love, 33; Rebs: Caleb Love, 7 Asts: K.J. Lewis, 8

McKale Center, Tucson, AZ
Attendance: 13,560
Referees: Jeffrey Anderson, Michael Greenstein, Chance Moore

=== at Cincinnati ===
ESPN2

January 4, 2025
12:30 p.m.

Box Score

Arizona Wildcats 72, No. 16 Cincinnati Bearcats 67
Scoring by half: 39–26, 33–41
Pts: Jaden Bradley, 15; Rebs: Henri Veesaar, 6 Asts: Henri Veesaar, 4	Pts: Dan Skillings, 18; Rebs: Aziz Bandaogo, 9 Asts: Jizzle James, 5

Fifth Third Arena, Cincinnati, OH
Attendance: 11,212
Referees: Tony Padilla, Bret Smith, Kipp Kissinger

=== at West Virginia ===
ESPN+

January 7, 2025
5:00 p.m.

Box Score

Arizona Wildcats 75, No. 21 West Virginia Mountaineers 56
Scoring by half: 39–28, 36–28
Pts: K.J. Lewis, 21; Rebs: Tied, 7 Asts: Jaden Bradley, 5	Pts: Javon Small, 17; Rebs: Javon Small, 6 Asts: Javon Small, 5

WVU Coliseum, Morgantown, WV
Attendance: 10,566
Referees: Randy McCall, Deron White, Tommy Johnson

=== UCF ===
ESPN

January 11, 2025
8:00 p.m.

Box Score

UCF Knights 80, Arizona Wildcats 88
Scoring by half: 42–45, 38–43
Pts: Keyshawn Hall, 22; Rebs: Moustapha Thiam, 10; Asts: Keyshawn Hall, 5	Pts: Caleb Love, 16; Rebs: Caleb Love, 8 Asts: Caleb Love, 6

McKale Center, Tucson, AZ
Attendance: 13,039
Referees: Marques Pettigrew, Chance Moore, James Ford

=== Baylor ===
ESPN

January 14, 2025
9:00 p.m.

No. 25 Baylor Bears 70, Arizona Wildcats 81
Scoring by half: 19–42, 51–39
Pts: Robert Wright, 16; Rebs: V.J. Edgecombe, 7 Asts: Robert Wright, 4	Pts: Henri Veesaar, 19; Rebs: Henri Veesaar, 7 Asts: K.J. Lewis, 7

McKale Center, Tucson, AZ
Attendance: 14,034
Referees: Tony Padilla, Darron George, Brooks Wells

=== at Texas Tech ===
ESPN2

January 18, 2025
12:00 p.m.

Box Score

Arizona Wildcats 54, Texas Tech Red Raiders 70
Scoring by half: 26–33, 28–37
Pts: Jaden Bradley, 11; Rebs: Tobe Awaka, 14; Asts: Jaden Bradley, 3	Pts: JT Toppin, 20; Rebs: JT Toppin, 16; Asts: Elijah Hawkins, 9

United Supermarkets Arena, Lubbock, TX
Attendance: 15,098
Referees: Doug Sirmons, Michael Greenstein, Keith Patterson

=== at Oklahoma State ===
ESPNU

January 21, 2025
9:00 p.m.

Box Score

Arizona Wildcats 92, Oklahoma State Cowboys 78
Scoring by half: 43–39, 49–39
Pts: Caleb Love, 27; Rebs: Tobe Awaka, 7 Asts: Jaden Bradley, 4	Pts: Tied, 21; Rebs: Abou Ousmane, 6 Asts: Arturo Dean, 6

Gallagher-Iba Arena, Stillwater, OK
Attendance: 6,355
Referees: Randy McCall, D.J. Carstensen, Rick Crawford

=== Colorado ===
ESPN+

January 25, 2025
1:00 p.m.

Box Score

Colorado Buffaloes 63, Arizona Wildcats 78
Scoring by half: 31–33, 32–45
Pts: Julian Hammond, 19; Rebs: Elijah Malone, 6 Asts: Julian Hammond, 4	Pts: Anthony Dell’Orso, 20; Rebs: Tobe Awaka, 15; Asts: Tied, 6

McKale Center, Tucson, AZ
Attendance: 14,688
Referees: Bert Smith, Tony Chiazza, De Selle Dean

=== Iowa State ===
ESPN

January 27, 2025
8:30 p.m.

Box Score

No. 3 Iowa State Cyclones 75, Arizona Wildcats 86 (OT)
Scoring by half: 30–34, 41–37 Overtime: 4–15
Pts: Tamin Lipsey, 18; Rebs: Dishon Jackson, 10; Asts: Joshua Jefferson, 4	Pts: Caleb Love, 25; Rebs: Tobe Awaka, 12; Asts: Tied

McKale Center, Tucson, AZ
Attendance: 14,688
Referees: Kipp Kissinger, Doug Sirmons, Tony Padilla

=== at Arizona State (rivalry) ===
CBS

February 1, 2025
11:00 a.m.

Box Score

Arizona Wildcats 81, Arizona State Sun Devils 72
Scoring by half: 35–34, 46–38
Pts: BJ Freeman, 19; Rebs: Jayden Quaintance, 8 Asts: Alston Mason, 7	Pts: Caleb Love, 27; Rebs: Carter Bryant, 10; Asts: Caleb Love, 7

Desert Financial Arena, Tempe, AZ
Attendance: 13,544
Referees: Brooks Wells, D.J. Carstensen, Chance Moore

=== at BYU ===
ESPN

February 4, 2025
9:00 p.m.

Box Score

No. 20 Arizona Wildcats 85, BYU Cougars 74
Scoring by half: 41–41, 44–33
Pts: Caleb Love, 18; Rebs: Tobe Awaka, 9 Asts: K.J. Lewis, 5	Pts: Egor Denim, 16; Rebs: Fousseyni Traore, 7 Asts: Dallin Hall, 6

Marriott Center, Provo, UT
Attendance: 17,274
Referees: Gregory Nixon, Randy McCall, Tommy Johnson

=== Texas Tech ===
ESPN

February 8, 2025
8:30 p.m.

Box Score

No. 13 Texas Tech Red Raiders 73, No. 20 Arizona Wildcats 82
Scoring by half: 37–39, 36–43
Pts: JT Toppin, 21; Rebs: JT Toppin, 13; Asts: Elijah Hawkins, 12	Pts: Tied, 16; Rebs: Tobe Awaka, 11; Asts: Caleb Love, 6

McKale Center, Tucson, AZ
Attendance: 14,688
Referees: Marques Pettigrew, Darron George, Greg Nixon

=== at Kansas State ===
ESPN+

February 11, 2025
6:00 p.m.

Box Score

No. 13 Arizona Wildcats 70, Kansas State Wildcats 73
Scoring by half: 29–35, 41–38
Pts: K.J. Lewis, 15; Rebs: Carter Bryant, 11; Asts: Jaden Bradley, 4	Pts: Dug McDaniel, 24; Rebs: Tied, 7 Asts: Coleman Hawkins, 4

Bramlage Coliseum, Manhattan, KS
Attendance: 8,914
Referees: Michael Greenstein, Kelly Self, Ted Valentine

=== Houston ===
ESPN

February 15, 2025
12:00 p.m.

Box Score

No. 6 Houston Cougars 62, No. 13 Arizona Wildcats 58
Scoring by half: 25–30, 37–28
Pts: Milos Uzan, 19; Rebs: Ja’Vier Francis, 7 Asts: Milos Uzan, 5	Pts: Caleb Love, 17; Rebs: Tied, 6 Asts: C. Love, 7

McKale Center, Tucson, AZ
Attendance: 14,688
Referees: Gregory Nixon, Rick Crawford, Randy McCall

=== at Baylor ===
ESPN

February 17, 2025
8:00 p.m.

Box Score

No. 19 Arizona Wildcats 74, Baylor Bears 67
Scoring by half: 41–33, 33–34
Pts: Tobe Awaka, 14; Rebs: Tobe Awaka, 12; Asts: Carter Bryant, 6	Pts: V.J. Edgecombe, 25; Rebs: Norchad Omier, 13; Asts: Robert Wright, 4

Foster Pavilion, Waco, TX
Attendance: 7,500
Referees: Doug Sirmons, Kipp Kissinger, Ray Natili

=== BYU ===
ESPN

February 22, 2025
8:00 p.m.

Box Score

BYU Cougars 96, No. 19 Arizona Wildcats 95
Scoring by half: 47–44, 49–51
Pts: Richie Saunders, 23; Rebs: Keba Keita, 6 Asts: Egor Denim, 8	Pts: Caleb Love, 27; Rebs: Tobe Awaka, 10; Asts: Tied, 5

McKale Center, Tucson, AZ
Attendance: 14,688
Referees: Tony Padilla, Antonio Petty, Justin Shamion

=== Utah ===
ESPN+

February 26, 2025
7:00 p.m.

Box Score

Utah Utes 66, No. 22 Arizona Wildcats 83
Scoring by half: 32–46, 34–37
Pts: Tied, 18; Rebs: Tied, 10; Asts: Gabe Madsen, 7	Pts: Caleb Love, 23; Rebs: Tobe Awaka, 10; Asts: Caleb Love, 7

McKale Center, Tucson, AZ
Attendance: 14,264
Referees: Randy McCall, Ray Natili, Tommy Johnson

=== at Iowa State ===
ESPN

March 1, 2025
7:00 p.m.

No. 22 Arizona Wildcats 67, No. 9 Iowa State Cyclones 84
Scoring by half: 30–43, 37–41
Pts: Jaden Bradley, 18; Rebs: Tied, 6 Asts: Caleb Love, 3	Pts: Milan Momcilovic, 17; Rebs: Brandon Chatfield, 8 Asts: Tamin Lipsey, 8

Hilton Coliseum, Ames, IA
Attendance: 14,267
Referees: Doug Sirmons, Brooks Wells, Keith Patterson

=== Arizona State (rivalry) ===
ESPN

March 4, 2025
9:00 p.m.

Box Score

Arizona State Sun Devils 100, No. 24 Arizona Wildcats 113
Scoring by half: 47–55, 53–58
Pts: Alston Mason, 33; Rebs: Basheer Jihad, 7 Asts: Alston Mason, 6	Pts: Henri Veesaar, 22; Rebs: Tobe Awaka, 9 Asts: Jaden Bradley, 7

McKale Center, Tucson, AZ
Attendance: 14,688
Referees: Marques Pettigrew, Randy McCall, Michael Greenstein

=== at Kansas ===
ESPN

March 8, 2025
2:30 p.m.

Box Score

No. 24 Arizona Wildcats 76, Kansas Jayhawks 83
Scoring by half: 30–39, 46–44
Pts: Hunter Dickinson, 33; Rebs: Hunter Dickinson, 10; Asts: Dajuan Harris, 9	Pts: Jaden Bradley, 21; Rebs: Tobe Awaka, 9 Asts: Caleb Love, 3

Allen Fieldhouse, Lawrence, KS
Attendance: 15,300
Referees: Brooks Wells, Jeffrey Anderson, Chance Moore

=== Kansas (Big 12 Quarterfinals) ===
ESPN

March 13, 2025
6:30 p.m.

No. 6 Kansas 77, No. 3 Arizona Wildcats 88
Scoring by half: 37–45, 40–43
Pts: Zeke Mayo, 20; Rebs: Hunter Dickinson, 12; Asts: KJ Adams, 5	Pts: Tied, 19; Rebs: Tied, 5 Asts: Caleb Live, 6

T-Mobile Center, Kansas City, MO
Attendance: 15,491
Referees: Doug Sirmons, Michael Greenstein, Tommy Johnson

=== Texas Tech Big 12 Tournament (Big 12 Semifinals) ===
ESPN2

March 14, 2025
6:30 p.m.

Box Score

No. 2 Texas Tech Red Raiders 80, No. 3 Arizona Wildcats 86
Scoring by half: 39–47, 41–39
Pts: Kevin Overton, 20; Rebs: Tied, 6 Asts: Elijah Hawkins, 5	Pts: Caleb Love, 27; Rebs: KJ Lewis, 8 Asts: KJ Lewis, 6

T-Mobile Center, Kansas City, MO
Attendance: 13,946
Referees: Kipp Kissinger, Marques Pettigrew, Gregory Nixon

=== Houston (Big 12 Championship) ===
ESPN2

March 15, 2025
3:00 p.m.

Box Score

No. 1 Houston Cougars 72, No. 3 Arizona Wildcats 64
Scoring by half: 28–33, 44–31
Pts: Milos Uzan, 25; Rebs: Tied, 7 Asts: Milos Uzan, 4	Pts: Caleb Love, 19; Rebs: Tobe Awaka, 9 Asts: Jaden Bradley, 2

T-Mobile Center, Kansas City, MO
Attendance: 13,768
Referees: Kipp Kissinger, Marques Pettigrew, Doug Sirmons

=== Akron (round of 64) ===
TruTV

March 21, 2025
4:35 p.m.

Box Score

No. 13 Akron 65, No. 4 Arizona Wildcats 93
Scoring by half: 31–41, 34–52
Pts: Tied, 13; Rebs: James Okonkwo, 4 Asts: Amani Lyles, 4	Pts: Jaden Bradley, 19; Rebs: Tied, 8 Asts: Anthony Dell’Orso, 5

Climate Pledge Arena, Seattle, WA
Attendance: 16,978
Referees: Michael Greenstein, Bill Covington Jr, Kelly Pfeifer

=== Oregon (round of 32) ===
TBS

March 23, 2025
6:40 p.m.

Box Score

No. 5 Oregon 83, No. 4 Arizona Wildcats 87
Scoring by half: 38–42, 45–45
Pts: Jackson Shelstad, 25; Rebs: Nathan Bittle, 11; Asts: Tied, 3	Pts: Caleb Love; Rebs: Tobe Awaka, 14; Asts: Tied, 4

Climate Pledge Arena, Seattle, WA
Attendance: 17,102
Referees: James Breeding, DJ Carstensen, and Matt Potter

=== Duke (Sweet 16) ===
CBS

March 27, 2025
6:39 p.m.

No. 1 Duke 100, No. 4 Arizona Wildcats 93
Scoring by half: 48–42, 52–51
Pts: Cooper Flagg, 30; Rebs: Tied, 6 Asts: Cooper Flagg, 7	Pts: Caleb Love, 35; Rebs: Henri Veesaar, 6 Asts: Jaden Bradley, 5

Prudential Center, Newark, NJ
Referees: Keith Kimble, Lee Cassell, Michael Greenstein

== Awards and honors ==
Weekly honors
Recipient (Position)	Award (Big 12 Conference)	Stats (PPG/RPG/APG)	Week	Date awarded	Ref.
Caleb Love	Big 12 Player of the Week	24.5 PPG/3.5 RPG/4.5 APG	Week 12	February 3, 2025	
Tobe Awaka	Big 12 Newcomber of the Week	14.0 PPG/10.0 RPG/1.0 APG/1.5 SPG	Week 13	February 10, 2025	

=== Midseason awards watchlists ===
Midseason award honors
Honors	Player	Position	Ref.
Jerry West Award	Caleb Love	SG	

=== Final awards watchlists ===
Final award honors
Honors	Player	Position	Ref.
Jerry West Award	Caleb Love	SG	

=== Postseason ===
Conference honors
Recipient (Position)	Award (Big 12 Conference)	Stats (PPG/RPG/APG)	Ref.
Caleb Love (SG)	All Big 12 First Team	17.0 PPG/4.3 RPG/4.0 APG/1.3 SPG	
Tobe Awaka (PF)	All Big 12 Honorable Mention	8.8 PPG/8.0 RPG	
Henri Veesaar (PF)	All Big 12 Honorable Mention	10.9 PPG/5.4 RPG/1.5 APG/1.0 SPG/1.6 BPG	

== Rankings ==
Ranking movements Legend: ██ Increase in ranking ██ Decrease in ranking — = Not ranked RV = Received votes
	Week																				
Poll	Pre	1	2	3	4	5	6	7	8	9	10	11	12	13	14	15	16	17	18	19	Final
AP	10	9	17	24	—	—	—	—	—	RV	RV	RV	RV	20	13	19	22	24	RV	21	15
Coaches	9	8	17	23	RV	—	—	—	—	RV	RV	RV	RV	20	13	18	21	23	24	20	13

== See also ==
2024–25 Arizona Wildcats women's basketball team
