= Dwayne Aristode =

Dutch basketball player (born 2006)

Oregon Ducks
- Position: Small forward
- Conference: Big Ten Conference

Personal information
- Born: August 17, 2006 (age 20) Lelystad, Netherlands
- Listed height: 6 ft 8 in (2.03 m)
- Listed weight: 220 lb (100 kg)

Career information
- High school: Brewster Academy (Wolfeboro, New Hampshire)
- College: Arizona (2025–2026); Oregon (2026–present)
- Playing career: 2021–2023

Career history
- 2021–2023: Joventut Badalona

Tita Kacou Dwayne Aristode (born August 17, 2006) is a Dutch college basketball player for the Oregon Ducks of the Big Ten Conference. He previously played for the Arizona Wildcats.

== Early life and high school ==
Aristode was born and grew up in Lelystad, Netherlands. His father named him after Dwyane Wade, who his father admired. He moved to Spain to play for the youth department team of Joventut Badalona. Aristode moved again to the United States in 2023 to enroll at Brewster Academy, a boarding school in Wolfeboro, New Hampshire. He averaged 12 points, 5.6 rebounds, 2.6 assists and 1.0 steals per game in his first year at Brewster.

Aristode committed to play college basketball at Arizona over offers from Duke, USC, Xavier, UCLA and Michigan State. He also considered a professional offer from the NBL Next Stars Program.

== College career ==
Aristode entered his freshman season at Arizona coming off the bench as part of the Wildcats' main playing rotation.

== National team career ==
Aristode was a member of the Netherlands under-16 national team for the 2022 FIBA U16 European Championship and averaged 15.3 points, 9.0 rebounds, and 3.1 assists during the tournament. He was briefly a part of the mens national team during the summer of 2024. He played exhibition games against Germany and Serbia (with Nikola Jokić) with the mens national team that summer.
