= Tommy Lloyd =

American basketball player and coach (born 1974)

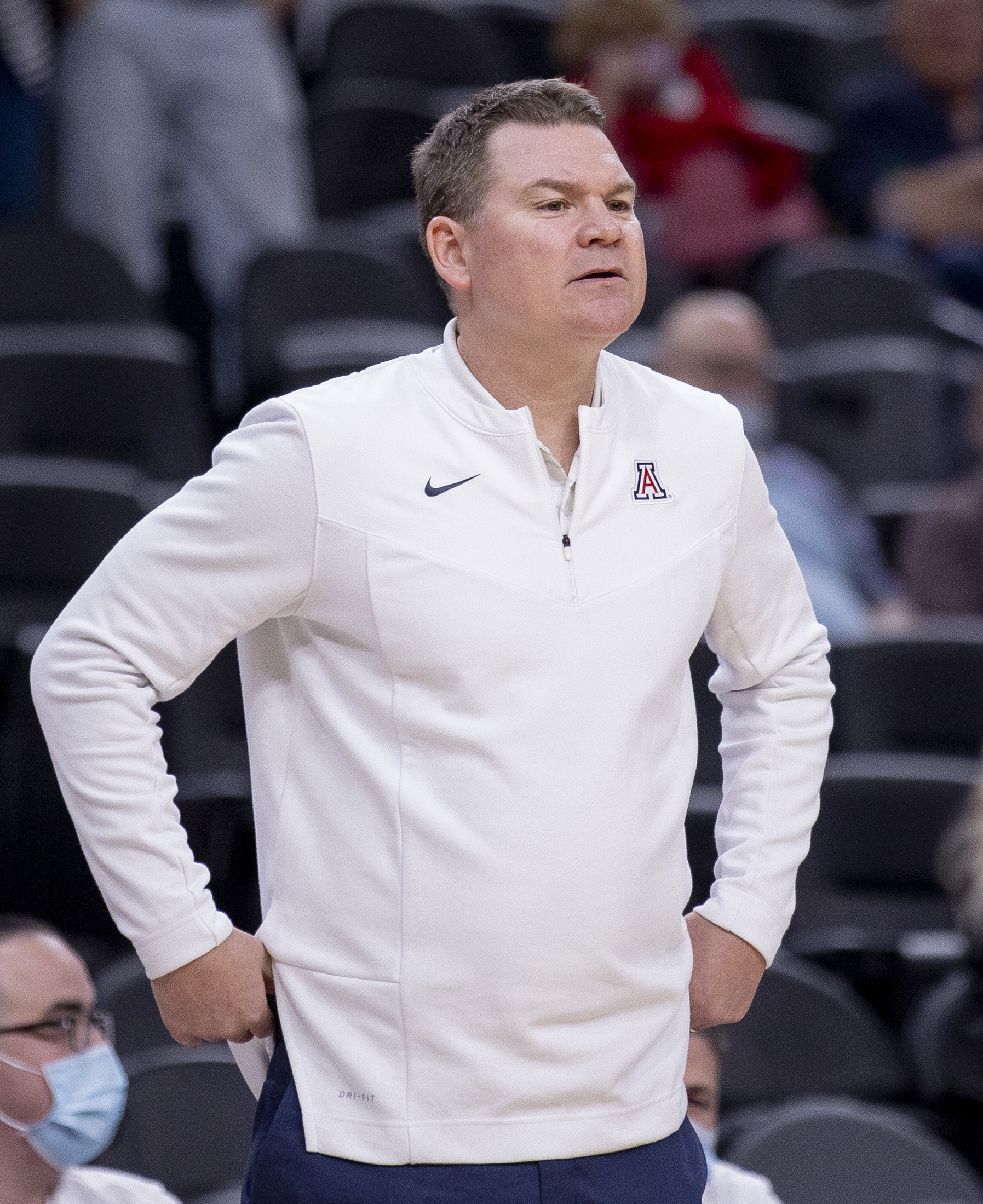
- Lloyd with Arizona in 2021

Current position
- Title: Head coach
- Team: Arizona
- Conference: Big 12
- Record: 152–37 (.804)
- Annual salary: $7.5 Million

Biographical details
- Born: December 21, 1974 (age 51); Kelso, Washington, U.S.

Playing career
- 1993–1995: Walla Walla CC
- 1995–1996: CSU–Pueblo
- 1996–1998: Whitman
- Position: Small forward

Coaching career (HC unless noted)
- 2001–2021: Gonzaga (assistant)
- 2021–present: Arizona

National
- 2024–2026: USA U-19

Administrative career (AD unless noted)
- 2000–2001: Gonzaga (admin. asst.)

Head coaching record
- Overall: 152–37 (.804)
- Tournaments: 10–5 (NCAA Division I)

Accomplishments and honors

Championships
- NCAA Division I regional – Final Four (2026); 2× Pac-12 tournament (2022, 2023); 2× Pac-12 regular season (2022, 2024); Big 12 regular season (2026); Big 12 tournament (2026)

Awards
- Pac-12 Coach of the Year (2022); AP Coach of the Year (2022); NABC Coach of the Year (2022); USBWA Coach of the Year (2022); USA Basketball Junior Coach of the Year (2025); Big 12 Coach of the Year (2026); Sporting News Coach of the Year (2026); Naismith Coach of the Year (2026)
Medal record
Head coach for United States
FIBA Under-18 AmeriCup
Gold medal – first place	2024 Argentina
FIBA Under-19 Basketball World Cup
Gold medal – first place	2025 Switzerland

Thomas Lloyd (born December 21, 1974) is an American college basketball coach who is the current head coach at the University of Arizona of the Big 12 Conference. His 148 wins in the first five seasons and 61 wins in the first two seasons are the most for any head coach in NCAA Division I history.

In the summer of 2024, he was the head coach of the United States men's national under-19 basketball team at the 2024 FIBA U18 Men’s AmeriCup in Buenos Aires. Lloyd continued his role in 2025 as the USA basketball men's U–19 coach and coached at the 2025 FIBA Under-19 Basketball World Cup in Lausanne.

== Playing career ==
Born and raised in Kelso, Washington, Lloyd graduated from Kelso High School in 1993. During his senior year, he led the Hilanders to a 21–4 record and to the WIAA state 4A tournament, their first appearance in fifteen years.

Lloyd began his collegiate career at Walla Walla Community College in Walla Walla; his 52 points against Treasure Valley Community College still stands as the school's single-game record. In his sophomore season, he averaged over twenty points per game and was selected to the Northwest Athletic Association of Community Colleges (now Northwest Athletic Conference) Eastern All-Star team. After graduating from WWCC, Lloyd transferred to Colorado State University–Pueblo. After one year with the ThunderWolves, he returned to Walla Walla to play his senior season at Whitman College, and graduated in 1998.

Lloyd played professionally in Australia and Germany.

== Coaching career ==
=== Gonzaga ===
According to a 2020 story by ESPN journalist Jeff Borzello, Lloyd's journey to his assistant coach position at Gonzaga actually began while he was playing in junior college. At the time, Gonzaga was still recruiting in Walla Walla's conference. After watching Lloyd, Gonzaga coach Dan Monson told him that he would not be offered a scholarship, but that if he ever wanted to go into coaching, he should give Monson a call. He made the call to Monson after his Whitman career, but had to back out once receiving an opportunity to play overseas. After his playing career, he and his wife Chanelle spent several months backpacking on several continents before he decided to begin a coaching career. By that time, Monson had left for Minnesota immediately after Gonzaga's 1999 Elite Eight run, and his top assistant Mark Few had replaced him as the Zags' head coach. Few honored the tacit agreement Monson had made with Lloyd, and Lloyd joined the men's basketball staff as a volunteer administrative assistant in 2000, becoming a full-time assistant the next year.

Lloyd soon became Gonzaga's key international recruiter. He began to develop a niche as an international recruiter early in his tenure on Few's staff. In Borzello's story, Few recalled that one area where he wanted Lloyd to develop was recruiting, telling him that in order to become an assistant at a top program, he needed a niche. Few told Borzello,

He loved traveling over in Europe. And I told him, hey, if you want to make it in this business, you gotta develop a niche, you gotta have something different than somebody else. There's so many guys in this business, you have to separate yourself. So he kind of figured out like, "Hey, I can figure out how to do this European thing and see if I can establish a network and trust, you know, some real expertise over there." And he's done that.

Among the international players that Lloyd has played a role in recruiting are former Bulldogs Mario Kasun (Croatia), Ronny Turiaf (France), J.P. Batista (Brazil), Abdullahi Kuso (Nigeria), Robert Sacre (Canada), Kelly Olynyk (Canada), Elias Harris (Germany), Kevin Pangos (Canada), Przemek Karnowski (Poland), Domantas Sabonis (Lithuania), Rui Hachimura (Japan), Killian Tillie (France), Filip Petrušev (Serbia), Joël Ayayi (France), Martynas Arlauskas (Lithuania), Pavel Zakharov (Russia), and Oumar Ballo (Mali). Lloyd has also been integral in developing NBA players for Gonzaga like Turiaf, Adam Morrison, Jeremy Pargo, Austin Daye, Sacre, Olynyk, Kyle Wiltjer, Sabonis, Zach Collins, Hachimura, and Brandon Clarke.

Lloyd had previously turned down numerous interview requests for head-coaching positions during his Gonzaga tenure. He was contractually guaranteed of becoming the Bulldogs' next head coach upon Few's departure. Gonzaga athletic director Mike Roth said, "Tommy has it in writing from me and the [university] president that says, as long as he's here, when Mark retires, it's your job. He's got a document. I've got a document. The president's got a document. Our general counsel has a document. It's his job." However, in 2021, Lloyd left Gonzaga for the head-coaching position at the University of Arizona.

=== Arizona (2021−present) ===
Two weeks after the 2021 NCAA tournament ended, Lloyd was announced as a candidate for the vacant head-coaching position at Arizona, which had been led the previous 12 seasons by Sean Miller. On April 15, 2021, Lloyd was introduced as Arizona's 18th head basketball coach. Coach Lloyd earned his first win in his first collegiate game as a head coach on November 9, 2021, beating Northern Arizona 81–52. Two weeks after his first career coaching victory, he earned his first victory over a ranked opponent, No. 4 Michigan, 80–62 to win the Roman Main Event and start the season 5–0. Also with his 5–0 start, Coach Lloyd became the first in division I history to win his first five games, win by an average of 30 points per game & beat an AP top-5 team. Arizona entered the top 25 AP Poll for the first time under Coach Lloyd at Number 17, on November 22, 2021. On December 5, Coach Lloyd defeated his first Pac-12 opponent in his first Pac-12 game, the Oregon State Beavers, 90–65. In the December 13, 2021, AP poll, Arizona reached the top 10 for the first time under coach Lloyd, coming in at number 8. Coach Lloyd lost the first game of his career & season in Knoxville on December 22, 2021, 73–77 against no. 19 Tennessee. On January 17, 2022, Arizona made it into the top 5 for the first time under Coach Lloyd, coming in at no. 3 in the AP poll. It was the program's first time in the top 5 since the 2017–18 season. The AP poll's update on February 21, 2022, placed Arizona no. 2 in the nation, following only Lloyd's former team, Gonzaga. Coach Lloyd & the Arizona Wildcats would win their 1st regular season conference title under Lloyd & 17th overall as a program with a 91–71 win over USC. After defeating Cal in the final regular season game, 89–61, Arizona & Coach Lloyd became the first program & coach to win 18 conference games in one season. They earned the Number 1 seed in the 2022 Pac-12 tournament. Coach Lloyd & Arizona would go on to defeat Stanford 84–80 in the Quarterfinals, Colorado 82–72 in the Semifinals & UCLA 84–76 in the finals to win Arizona’s eighth conference tournament title overall & Coach Lloyd’s first. Following the end of the season Coach Lloyd won the AP Coach of the Year, NABC Coach of the Year & USBWA Coach of the Year.

Before the 2022–23 season, Arizona had three players, Bennedict Mathruin (Pacers), Dalen Terry(Bulls) & Christian Koloko (Raptors) taken in the 2022 NBA draft. Arizona would begin the season 6–0, which included winning the 2023 Maui Invitational with wins over No.17 San Diego State & No. 10 Creighton. The team also played in the Las Vegas Clash, a neutral site game against No. 14 Indiana, which Arizona won 89–75. Arizona's last big non-conference matchup would feature a home game against No. 6 Tennessee, with Arizona winning 75–70. Arizona & Coach Lloyd would end the non-conference part of the schedule with a record of 12–0. Lloyd would become the fastest coach to 50 wins, doing so in 57 games, with a 58–52 win over their rival No. 5 UCLA, it was Arizona's 5th win over a ranked team during the season. Arizona would end the season losing to their rival in Los Angeles, 73–82, giving them an overall record of 25–6 & 14–6 in conference play. They would enter postseason play ranked No. 8 overall & the No. 2 in the 2023 Pac-12 Tournament in Las Vegas. Arizona defeated No. 10 seed Stanford Cardinal 95–84, which was his 59th career win, the most of any head coach to start their coaching career. Arizona defeated Arizona State in the Semifinals, 78-59. Arizona then defeated rivals UCLA 61-59 to win Arizona’s ninth conference tournament title overall, and the second title in a row. He became the first power conference head coach to win his conference tournament championships in his first two seasons as head coach. Arizona earn a No. 2 seed in the South Region of the 2023 NCAA Tournament, with a first round match up against Ivy League Champion and No. 15 seed Princeton. Arizona was upset 55–59, ending their season with an overall record of 28–7. His 61 wins through his first two seasons as head coach are the most in Division I history.

Arizona began the 2024–25 season as a member of the Big-12 Conference after spending the previous 50 seasons in the Pac-12 Conference. The team was ranked number 10 in the preseason AP Poll. Arizona ended non-conference play 6–5 with a 4th place finish in the Battle 4 Atlantis. Lloyd would win his first Big 12 conference game in the first match up against TCU 90–81. Coach Lloyd won his 100th game as head coach doing so in his 126th game overall and became the 10th fastest to do so in a Power Conference.

To start the 2025–26 season, Arizona was ranked number 13 in the preseason AP Poll. Arizona ended their non-conference play with 13–0, defeating the defending national champion No. 3 Florida, No. 13 UCLA, No. 3 UConn, No. 20 Auburn and No. 12 Alabama. Lloyd and the Wildcats would go on to start the season 23–0, which was the best start in school and Big 12 history. Arizona would suffer its first loss of the season at No. 9 Kansas 78−82, followed by a second consecutive loss to No. 16 Texas Tech 75−78 in overtime. The Wildcats would win their final six regular season games against No. 23 BYU, No. 2 Houston, No. 14 Kansas and No. 6 Iowa State to win their second Big 12 regular season title, finishing with a 29−2 record and number 1 overall seed in the Big 12 Tournament. On March 12, 2026 Coach Lloyd won The Sporting News Men's College Basketball Coach of the Year Award, the first Arizona coach in history to win the award. Arizona earned a No. 1 Seed in the West Region of the NCAA Tournament, with a first round match up against Northeast Conference Champion and No. 16 seed LIU, in which they won 92–58. Arizona would go on to defeated No. 9 seed Utah State 78–66, No. 4 seed Arkansas 109–88 and No. 2 seed Purdue 79–64 to reach the schools fifth Final Four and first since reach the 2001 NCAA Tournament Final Four. Their season ended after a 73–91 defeat to No. 1 (MW) seed and eventual national champion Michigan.

=== United States ===
Lloyd became the head coach of the United States under-19 men's national basketball team in 2024. Lloyd coached the 2024 FIBA U18 Men’s AmeriCup in Buenos Aires, Argentina from June 3–9, 2024 alongside his assistant coaches Grant McCasland (Texas Tech University) and Micah Shrewsberry (University of Notre Dame). The team won gold by going 6–0, winning by an average of 41.5 points. With the win the team qualified for the 2025 FIBA Under-19 Basketball World Cup in Switzerland.

Coach Lloyd led the United States U-19 Team in Switzerland from June 28 – July 6. The team went 7–0, scoring an average of 114.7 points winning by an average of 39 points, defeating Germany 109–76 in the Championship Game. Grant McCasland and Micah Shrewsberry reprised their roles as assistant coaches. On January 7, 2026, Coach Lloyd was named Team USA 2025 Junior Coach of the Year.

== Head coaching record ==
Record table
Season	Team	Overall	Conference	Standing	Postseason
Arizona Wildcats (Pac-12 Conference) (2021–2024)
2021–22	Arizona	33–4	18–2	1st	NCAA Division I Sweet 16
2022–23	Arizona	28–7	14–6	T–2nd	NCAA Division I Round of 64
2023–24	Arizona	27–9	15–5	1st	NCAA Division I Sweet 16
Arizona Wildcats (Big 12 Conference) (2024–present)
2024–25	Arizona	24–13	14–6	T–3rd	NCAA Division I Sweet 16
2025–26	Arizona	36–3	16–2	1st	NCAA Division I Final Four
2026–27	Arizona	4–1	0–0		
Arizona:		152–37 (.804)	77–21 (.786)		
Total:		152–37 (.804)			
National champion Postseason invitational champion Conference regular season champion Conference regular season and conference tournament champion Division regular season champion Division regular season and conference tournament champion Conference tournament champion

== Personal life ==
Tommy Lloyd and his wife Chanelle built a new house in Spokane in 2018, with a "video game system covered in Gonzaga paraphernalia in the basement." They have two daughters and one son, including Liam, who is currently on the coaching staff as the Director of Video and Scouting and also played basketball at Arizona, Grand Canyon and Northern Arizona. During the construction of their former home, the family lived in the childhood home of Bulldogs legend and Hall of Famer John Stockton. Since becoming coach at Arizona, Lloyd has become an avid pickleball player. His favorite band is Beastie Boys.

== Awards, records and achievements ==
=== NCAA ===
- AP Coach of the Year (2022)
- NABC Coach of the Year (2022)
- USBWA Coach of the Year (2022)
- Naismith College Coach of the Year (2026)
- Sporting News Coach of the Year (2026)
- Most wins by a head coach in their first five seasons with 148
- Most wins by a head coach in their first two seasons with 61
- 2nd most wins by a head coach in their first season with 33 (Bill Guthridge)

=== Pac-12 Conference ===
- Pac-12 Coach of the Year (2022)
- Longest home court winning streak to start career with 26
- First power conference coach to win his conference tournament in his first two seasons
- First and only Pac-12 coach to win 18 regular season conference games
- Fastest coach to 50 wins (57 Games)

=== Big-12 Conference ===
- Big-12 Coach of the Year (2026)

=== Arizona ===
- First Arizona coach to win 20 games in each of their first five seasons
- First Arizona head coach to win 29 regular season games in a single season (2026)
