= Arizona–Arizona State men's basketball rivalry =

American college basketball rivalry

- Arizona Wildcats Arizona State Sun Devils
- Sport: College Basketball
- First meeting: December 13, 1913; Arizona 41 – Arizona State 17
- Latest meeting: January 31, 2026; Arizona 87 – Arizona State 74
- Next meeting: January 16, 2027; McKale Center, Tucson, AZ

Statistics
- Total meetings: 252
- All-time series: Arizona leads, 165–87
- Largest victory: Arizona by 45 (February 17, 2024)
- Current win streak: Arizona, 7 (March 10, 2023–present)

Locations of Arizona and Arizona State

The Arizona–Arizona State men's basketball rivalry is a college basketball rivalry between the University of Arizona Wildcats and the Arizona State University Sun Devils.

== History ==
Men's Basketball Comparison
	Arizona	Arizona State
First Season	1904	1911
NCAA Championships	1	0
NCAA Final Fours	5	0
NCAA Tournament Appearances	40*	17*
Conference Championships	30	8
Conference tournament Championships	10	0

The rivalry dates to 1913, when the University of Arizona in Tucson played the Normal School of Arizona in Tempe – which later evolved into Arizona State University. Since Arizona State became a University in December 5, 1958 Arizona leads ASU 84–58. Before both the schools were affiliated with a conference from 1913−30, Arizona led the series 24−4. During the Border Conference years from 1931−61, Arizona led 56−31. Upon joining the WAC conference from 1961−1978, Arizona State led that period 22−14. Since both schools joined the Pac-10 conference in the 1978–79 season & including the Pac-12 Arizona led ASU 67–30. During the Lute Olson era as head coach from the 1983-84 until the 2006−2007 season Arizona led ASU 43–6. Sean Miller took over as head coach for the 2009–10 until the 2021–22 Arizona led 17–7 while Bobby Hurley was 4−19 all-time against Arizona.

Beginning in 1928, the rivalry was scheduled on its "traditional" date. Pop McKale, UA's coach and namesake of the present UA stadium, began challenging Arizona for their perennial spot on top of the conference standings. It was officially given the name Territorial Cup in 1939.

The Arizona–Arizona State game has been played in four locations: Los Angeles, CA, Las Vegas, NV, Tempe, AZ, and Tucson, AZ. Arizona leads the series in all three venues: Tempe, 68–55; in Tucson, 94–31: in Las Vegas, 1–0 and for games contested in Los Angeles, the series is tied at 1–1. Arizona won the last game, played on January 31, 2026, 89–82. Arizona leads the series 165–87, which includes an 80–29 start for Arizona from 1913 to 1958.

Current Arizona head coach Tommy Lloyd is 10−1 all-time against ASU. Arizona State head coach Randy Bennett is 0−0 all-time against Arizona and 0−3 in his coaching history.

=== Streaks ===
The Arizona–Arizona State rivalry has been known for streaks. In the first major streak of the series, Arizona won 9 straight over the Sun Devils from 1913 to 1926. Arizona has the longest winning streak of the series, 17 games, from 1945 to 1952. The streak was broken by Arizona State in 1952. Arizona State's longest streak was 15 games from 1958 to 1965. Arizona currently has a seven game winning streak in the series.

== Results ==
=== Scores of games (1920–2026) ===
Arizona victories	Arizona State victories	Tie games

No.	Date	Location	Winner	Score
1	December 13, 1913	Tucson, AZ	Arizona	41–17
2	January 10, 1914	Tempe, AZ	Arizona	13–9
3	January 13, 1923	Tucson, AZ	Arizona	29–20
4	January 31, 1923	Tempe, AZ	Arizona	31–22
5	January 26, 1924	Tempe, AZ	Arizona	39–24
6	January 24, 1925	Tucson, AZ	Arizona	42–16
7	February 2, 1925	Tempe, AZ	Arizona	40–17
8	February 4, 1925	Tempe, AZ	Arizona	17–16
9	January 13, 1926	Tucson, AZ	Arizona	30–24
10	January 16, 1926	Tucson, AZ	Arizona State	23–18
11	February 1, 1926	Tempe, AZ	Arizona State	25–19
12	February 2, 1926	Tempe, AZ	Arizona	32–21
13	January 21, 1927	Tucson, AZ	Arizona	29–18
14	January 22, 1927	Tucson, AZ	Arizona	32–25
15	January 31, 1927	Tempe, AZ	Arizona	36–29
16	February 1, 1927	Tempe, AZ	Arizona	43–25
17	January 13, 1928	Tucson, AZ	Arizona	39–32
18	January 14, 1928	Tucson, AZ	Arizona	38–24
19	January 30, 1928	Tempe, AZ	Arizona State	47–27
20	February 1, 1928	Tempe, AZ	Arizona	30–23
21	January 18, 1929	Tucson, AZ	Arizona	36–18
22	January 19, 1929	Tucson, AZ	Arizona	54–20
23	February 4, 1929	Tempe, AZ	Arizona	56–22
24	February 5, 1929	Tempe, AZ	Arizona	43–21
25	January 10, 1930	Tucson, AZ	Arizona	50–40
26	January 11, 1930	Tucson, AZ	Arizona	54–23
27	February 3, 1930	Tempe, AZ	Arizona	48–40
28	February 4, 1930	Tempe, AZ	Arizona State	34–31
29	January 23, 1931	Tucson, AZ	Arizona State	28–20
30	January 24, 1931	Tucson, AZ	Arizona	26–24
31	February 3, 1931	Tempe, AZ	Arizona State	38–20
32	February 4, 1931	Tempe, AZ	Arizona	28–23
33	January 15, 1932	Tucson, AZ	Arizona	39–20
34	January 16, 1932	Tucson, AZ	Arizona	50–38
35	February 1, 1932	Tempe, AZ	Arizona	51–24
36	February 2, 1932	Tempe, AZ	Arizona	36–26
37	January 13, 1933	Tucson, AZ	Arizona	32–30
38	January 14, 1933	Tucson, AZ	Arizona	30–29
39	February 3, 1933	Tempe, AZ	Arizona	35–21
40	February 4, 1933	Tempe, AZ	Arizona	21–16
41	January 19, 1934	Tucson, AZ	Arizona	33–22
42	January 20, 1934	Tucson, AZ	Arizona	34–26
43	February 2, 1934	Tempe, AZ	Arizona	39–24
44	February 3, 1934	Tempe, AZ	Arizona	52–26
45	January 18, 1935	Tucson, AZ	Arizona	36–30
46	January 19, 1935	Tucson, AZ	Arizona	40–35
47	February 1, 1935	Tempe, AZ	Arizona State	40–33
48	February 2, 1935	Tempe, AZ	Arizona	49–39
49	January 13, 1936	Tucson, AZ	Arizona	34–27
50	January 14, 1936	Tucson, AZ	Arizona	40–39
51	February 7, 1936	Tempe, AZ	Arizona State	43–41
52	February 8, 1936	Tempe, AZ	Arizona	38–34
53	January 8, 1937	Tucson, AZ	Arizona	38–27
54	January 9, 1937	Tucson, AZ	Arizona	51–33
55	January 15, 1937	Tempe, AZ	Arizona	37–36
56	January 16, 1937	Tempe, AZ	Arizona State	44–27
57	January 7, 1938	Tucson, AZ	Arizona State	52–41
58	January 8, 1938	Tucson, AZ	Arizona State	37–34
59	February 28, 1938	Tempe, AZ	Arizona State	49–31
60	March 1, 1938	Tempe, AZ	Arizona State	44–38
61	January 6, 1939	Tempe, AZ	Arizona State	35–33
62	January 7, 1939	Tempe, AZ	Arizona State	40–36
63	February 24, 1939	Tucson, AZ	Arizona State	50–43
64	February 25, 1939	Tucson, AZ	Arizona	48–44
65	January 12, 1940	Tucson, AZ	Arizona	37–35
66	January 13, 1940	Tucson, AZ	Arizona	36–34
67	February 5, 1940	Tempe, AZ	Arizona	51–40
68	February 6, 1940	Tempe, AZ	Arizona State	39–37
69	January 10, 1941	Tucson, AZ	Arizona	55–40
70	January 11, 1941	Tucson, AZ	Arizona	51–38
71	March 5, 1941	Tempe, AZ	Arizona State	51–34
72	January 17, 1942	Tucson, AZ	Arizona	59–45
73	January 27, 1942	Tempe, AZ	Arizona State	42–41
74	January 14, 1943	Tucson, AZ	Arizona	49–35
75	January 15, 1943	Tucson, AZ	Arizona State	41–39
76	January 22, 1943	Tempe, AZ	Arizona	63–40
77	January 23, 1943	Tempe, AZ	Arizona	43–29
78	December 15, 1944	Tempe, AZ	Arizona State	52–44
79	December 16, 1944	Tempe, AZ	Arizona State	48–41
80	January 19, 1945	Tucson, AZ	Arizona	39–36
81	January 20, 1945	Tucson, AZ	Arizona	39–37
82	January 11, 1946	Tucson, AZ	Arizona	58–30
83	January 12, 1946	Tucson, AZ	Arizona	60–37
84	January 25, 1946	Tempe, AZ	Arizona	45–35
85	January 26, 1946	Tempe, AZ	Arizona	44–27
86	January 25, 1947	Tempe, AZ	Arizona	61–50
87	February 1, 1947	Tucson, AZ	Arizona	63–41
88	January 24, 1948	Tempe, AZ	Arizona	47–46
89	February 21, 1948	Tucson, AZ	Arizona	61–58
90	January 24, 1949	Tempe, AZ	Arizona	45–44
91	February 19, 1949	Tucson, AZ	Arizona	63–60
92	January 16, 1950	Tempe, AZ	Arizona	81–61
93	February 4, 1950	Tucson, AZ	Arizona	73–51
94	February 9, 1951	Tucson, AZ	#13 Arizona	87–66
95	March 5, 1951	Tempe, AZ	#12 Arizona	71–59
96	February 11, 1952	Tucson, AZ	Arizona	77–69
97	February 28, 1952	Tempe, AZ	Arizona State	87–59
98	January 31, 1953	Tempe, AZ	Arizona State	75–73
99	February 12, 1953	Tucson, AZ	Arizona	65–60
100	January 22, 1954	Tucson, AZ	Arizona	79–65
101	February 8, 1954	Tempe, AZ	Arizona	82–75
102	January 29, 1955	Tempe, AZ	Arizona State	92–74
103	March 2, 1955	Tucson, AZ	Arizona State	104–103
104	January 18, 1956	Tucson, AZ	Arizona	89–76
105	February 25, 1956	Tempe, AZ	Arizona State	96–88
106	February 16, 1957	Tempe, AZ	Arizona	96–90
107	March 4, 1957	Tucson, AZ	Arizona	77–70
108	February 22, 1958	Tucson, AZ	Arizona State	70–66
109	March 3, 1958	Tempe, AZ	Arizona State	78–76
110	January 24, 1959	Tempe, AZ	Arizona State	88–72
111	February 7, 1959	Tucson, AZ	Arizona State	85–62
112	January 23, 1960	Tucson, AZ	Arizona State	71–61
113	March 5, 1960	Tempe, AZ	Arizona State	76–71
114	February 4, 1961	Tempe, AZ	Arizona State	94–78
115	February 25, 1961	Tucson, AZ	Arizona State	94–75
116	January 20, 1962	Tucson, AZ	Arizona State	73–67
117	February 27, 1962	Tempe, AZ	Arizona State	67–53
118	February 9, 1963	Tempe, AZ	#5 Arizona State	73–54
119	March 4, 1963	Tucson, AZ	#4 Arizona State	58–53
120	February 8, 1964	Tucson, AZ	Arizona State	67–66
121	March 4, 1964	Tempe, AZ	Arizona State	72–69
122	February 13, 1965	Tempe, AZ	Arizona State	76–69
123	March 3, 1965	Tucson, AZ	Arizona	97–87
124	January 22, 1966	Tucson, AZ	Arizona State	68–65
125	February 26, 1966	Tempe, AZ	Arizona	91–80
126	January 7, 1967	Tempe, AZ	Arizona State	73–67
127	February 25, 1967	Tucson, AZ	Arizona	92–65
128	January 6, 1968	Tucson, AZ	Arizona	74–69

No.	Date	Location	Winner	Score
129	February 17, 1968	Tempe, AZ	Arizona State	78–61
130	January 11, 1969	Tempe, AZ	Arizona	81–80
131	March 1, 1969	Tucson, AZ	Arizona	90–73
132	February 7, 1970	Tucson, AZ	Arizona	97–75
133	March 4, 1970	Tempe, AZ	Arizona	90–89
134	January 16, 1971	Tempe, AZ	Arizona State	112–83
135	February 20, 1971	Tucson, AZ	Arizona State	95–83
136	February 5, 1972	Tucson, AZ	Arizona State	91–78
137	March 4, 1972	Tempe, AZ	Arizona State	83–75
138	January 13, 1973	Tempe, AZ	Arizona State	63–60
139	February 17, 1973	Tucson, AZ	Arizona State	110–105
140	February 2, 1974	Tucson, AZ	Arizona	98–90
141	March 2, 1974	Tempe, AZ	Arizona State	108–95
142	February 1, 1975	Tucson, AZ	#12 Arizona State	83–81
143	March 8, 1975	Tempe, AZ	#8 Arizona State	107–92
144	February 7, 1976	Tempe, AZ	Arizona State	67–63
145	March 6, 1976	Tucson, AZ	Arizona	77–72
146	November 26, 1976	Tucson, AZ	#10 Arizona	92–91
147	February 5, 1977	Tucson, AZ	#19 Arizona	99–83
148	March 5, 1977	Tempe, AZ	Arizona State	95–89
149	November 26, 1977	Tempe, AZ	Arizona	72–70
150	February 4, 1978	Tempe, AZ	Arizona State	69–64
151	March 4, 1978	Tucson, AZ	Arizona	88–75
152	November 24, 1978	Tucson, AZ	Arizona State	84–82
153	January 27, 1979	Tempe, AZ	Arizona State	76–68
154	February 24, 1979	Tucson, AZ	Arizona	85–80
155	December 27, 1979	Tempe, AZ	Arizona State	85–78
156	January 26, 1980	Tucson, AZ	Arizona State	97–72
157	February 23, 1980	Tempe, AZ	#18 Arizona State	78–72
158	January 24, 1981	Tempe, AZ	#7 Arizona State	83–65
159	February 21, 1981	Tucson, AZ	#7 Arizona State	71–66
160	January 23, 1982	Tucson, AZ	Arizona State	55–54
161	February 20, 1982	Tempe, AZ	Arizona State	82–56
162	January 22, 1983	Tempe, AZ	Arizona State	82–69
163	February 19, 1983	Tucson, AZ	Arizona State	77–70
164	January 20, 1984	Tucson, AZ	Arizona	71–49
165	February 17, 1984	Tempe, AZ	Arizona	65–64
166	January 5, 1985	Tempe, AZ	Arizona	61–60
167	March 9, 1985	Tucson, AZ	Arizona	68–48
168	January 4, 1986	Tucson, AZ	Arizona	62–53
169	March 9, 1986	Tempe, AZ	Arizona State	70–63
170	January 29, 1987	Tempe, AZ	Arizona	82–67
171	February 3, 1987	Tucson, AZ	Arizona	66–54
172	January 28, 1988	Tucson, AZ	#1 Arizona	99–59
173	February 25, 1988	Tempe, AZ	#3 Arizona	101–73
174	January 26, 1989	Tempe, AZ	#6 Arizona	96–71
175	February 23, 1989	Tucson, AZ	#2 Arizona	109–74
176	January 17, 1990	Tempe, AZ	#23 Arizona	70–61
177	February 15, 1990	Tucson, AZ	#20 Arizona	71–50
178	January 16, 1991	Tempe, AZ	#6 Arizona	74–71
179	February 13, 1991	Tucson, AZ	#6 Arizona	71–50
180	January 22, 1992	Tucson, AZ	#11 Arizona	92–65
181	February 20, 1992	Tempe, AZ	Arizona State	77–74
182	January 20, 1993	Tempe, AZ	#11 Arizona	91–87
183	February 18, 1993	Tucson, AZ	#4 Arizona	116–80
184	January 5, 1994	Tucson, AZ	#9 Arizona	98–81
185	March 12, 1994	Tempe, AZ	Arizona State	94–87
186	January 5, 1995	Tempe, AZ	#15 Arizona State	53–52
187	March 11, 1995	Tucson, AZ	#18 Arizona State	103–98
188	January 10, 1996	Tempe, AZ	#18 Arizona	108–76
189	February 7, 1996	Tucson, AZ	#16 Arizona	71–69
190	January 11, 1997	Tempe, AZ	#7 Arizona	92–84
191	February 5, 1997	Tucson, AZ	#14 Arizona	87–71
192	January 15, 1998	Tucson, AZ	#5 Arizona	127–99
193	February 14, 1998	Tempe, AZ	#3 Arizona	83–82
194	January 14, 1999	Tempe, AZ	#7 Arizona	74–73
195	February 10, 1999	Tucson, AZ	#10 Arizona	86–80
196	January 26, 2000	Tempe, AZ	#5 Arizona	82–55
197	February 26, 2000	Tucson, AZ	#4 Arizona	89–82
198	January 24, 2001	Tucson, AZ	#12 Arizona	86–75
199	February 21, 2001	Tempe, AZ	#8 Arizona	88–58
200	January 23, 2002	Tempe, AZ	Arizona State	88–72
201	February 20, 2002	Tucson, AZ	#14 Arizona	83–75
202	March 7, 2002^{A}	Los Angeles, CA	#15 Arizona	73–56
203	January 22, 2003	Tucson, AZ	#1 Arizona	71–63
204	February 22, 2003	Tempe, AZ	#1 Arizona	92–72
205	January 3, 2004	Tempe, AZ	#4 Arizona	93–74
206	March 7, 2004	Tucson, AZ	#22 Arizona	106–82
207	January 2, 2005	Tucson, AZ	#14 Arizona	97–79
208	March 5, 2005	Tempe, AZ	#11 Arizona	70–68
209	January 25, 2006	Tempe, AZ	Arizona	80–70
210	February 25, 2006	Tucson, AZ	Arizona	68–47
211	January 24, 2007	Tucson, AZ	#19 Arizona	71–47
212	February 25, 2007	Tempe, AZ	Arizona	61–58
213	January 9, 2008	Tempe, AZ	Arizona State	64–59
214	February 10, 2008	Tucson, AZ	Arizona State	59–54
215	January 21, 2009	Tucson, AZ	#17 Arizona State	53–47
216	February 22, 2009	Tempe, AZ	#14 Arizona State	70–68
217	March 12, 2009^{B}	Los Angeles, CA	#23 Arizona State	68–56
218	January 23, 2010	Tempe, AZ	Arizona	77–58
219	February 21, 2010	Tucson, AZ	Arizona State	73–69
220	January 15, 2011	Tucson, AZ	Arizona	80–69
221	February 13, 2011	Tempe, AZ	#15 Arizona	67–52
222	December 31, 2011	Tucson, AZ	Arizona	68–51
223	March 4, 2012	Tempe, AZ	Arizona State	87–80
224	January 19, 2013	Tempe, AZ	#7 Arizona	71–54
225	March 9, 2013	Tucson, AZ	#18 Arizona	73–58
226	January 16, 2014	Tucson, AZ	#1 Arizona	91–68
227	February 14, 2014	Tempe, AZ	Arizona State	69–66
228	January 4, 2015	Tucson, AZ	#8 Arizona	73–49
229	February 7, 2015	Tempe, AZ	Arizona State	81–78
230	January 3, 2016	Tempe, AZ	#8 Arizona	94–82
231	February 17, 2016	Tucson, AZ	#12 Arizona	99–61
232	January 12, 2017	Tucson, AZ	#16 Arizona	91–75
233	March 4, 2017	Tempe, AZ	#7 Arizona	73–60
234	December 30, 2017	Tucson, AZ	#17 Arizona	84–78
235	February 15, 2018	Tempe, AZ	#17 Arizona	77–70
236	January 31, 2019	Tempe, AZ	Arizona State	95–88
237	March 9, 2019	Tucson, AZ	Arizona State	72–64
238	January 4, 2020	Tucson, AZ	#25 Arizona	75–47
239	January 25, 2020	Tempe, AZ	Arizona State	66–65
240	January 21, 2021	Tempe, AZ	Arizona	84–82
241	January 25, 2021	Tucson, AZ	Arizona	80–67
242	January 29, 2022	Tucson, AZ	#3 Arizona	67–56
243	February 7, 2022	Tempe, AZ	#4 Arizona	91–79
244	December 31, 2022	Tempe, AZ	#5 Arizona	69–60
245	February 25, 2023	Tucson, AZ	Arizona State	89–88
246	March 10, 2023^{C}	Paradise, NV	#8 Arizona	78–59
247	February 17, 2024	Tucson, AZ	#5 Arizona	105–60
248	February 28, 2024	Tempe, AZ	#6 Arizona	85–67
249	February 1, 2025	Tempe, AZ	Arizona	81–72
250	March 4, 2025	Tucson, AZ	#24 Arizona	113–100
251	January 14, 2026	Tucson, AZ	#1 Arizona	89–82
252	January 31, 2026	Tempe, AZ	#1 Arizona	87–74
253	January 16, 2027	Tucson, AZ		
254	February 17, 2027	Tempe, AZ		
Series: Arizona leads 165–87

=== Program Achievements ===
Basketball Comparison
	Arizona	Arizona State
First Season	1904	1911
NCAA Tournament Appearances	40	17
Sweet Sixteen Appearances	22	4
Elite Eight Appearances	12	3
Final Four Appearances	5	0
Title Game Appearances	2	0
National Championships	1	0
Regular-Season Conference Champions	30	8
Conference Tournament Champions	10	0
Consensus All-Americans	8	1
NCAA Tournament Record	66−39	15−18
All-time program record	1886−990−1	1481−1331−0

=== Notes ===
^{A} 2002 Pacific-10 Conference men's basketball tournament
^{B} 2009 Pacific-10 Conference men's basketball tournament
^{C} 2023 Pac-12 Conference men's basketball tournament

† The NCAA tournament was canceled in response to the COVID-19 global pandemic of 2020. The Pac-12 tournament was canceled after the second round after Arizona was defeated Washington in the quarterfinals and Arizona State had yet to play a game.

== See also ==
- Duel in the Desert
- Arizona Wildcats
- Arizona State Sun Devils
- Territorial Cup Series
