= Anthony Dell'Orso =

Australian basketball player (born 2003)

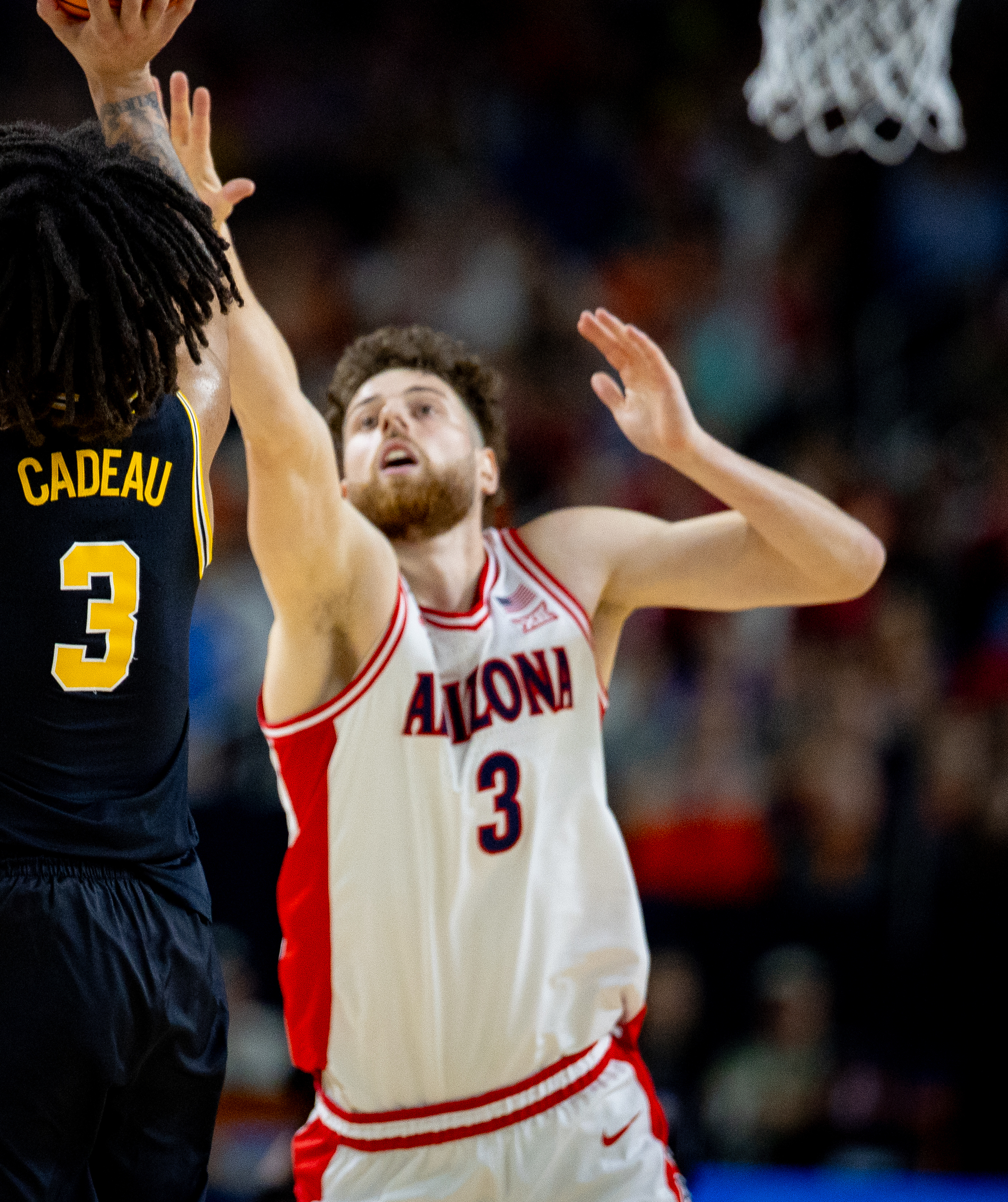
- Dell'Orso with Arizona in 2026

No. 2 – Perth Wildcats
- Position: Shooting guard
- League: NBL

Personal information
- Born: 24 July 2003 (age 23) Melbourne, Victoria, Australia
- Listed height: 6 ft 6 in (1.98 m)
- Listed weight: 205 lb (93 kg)

Career information
- High school: Marcellin College (Melbourne, Victoria)
- College: Campbell (2022–2024); Arizona (2024–2026)
- NBA draft: 2026: undrafted
- Playing career: 2026–present

Career history
- 2026–present: Perth Wildcats

Career highlights
- Second team All-CAA (2024); Big South Freshman of the Year (2023)

Anthony Mark Dell'Orso (born 24 July 2003) is an Australian basketball player for the Perth Wildcats of the National Basketball League (NBL). He played college basketball for the Campbell Fighting Camels and Arizona Wildcats.

== Early life and high school ==
Dell'Orso was born in Melbourne, Victoria. He he attended high school at Marcellin College in the suburb of Bulleen. He decided to play college basketball in the United States, committing to play for the Campbell Fighting Camels.

== College career ==
=== Campbell ===
As a freshman in 2022–23 season, Dell'Orso was named the Big South Conference Freshman of the Year after averaging 12.5 points and 5.8 rebounds per game. In 2023–24, he earned second-team all-Coastal Athletic Association honors after averaging 19.5 points and 6.5 rebounds per game while shooting 38 percent from 3-point range. After the conclusion of the 2023-24 season, Dell'Orso entered his name into the NCAA transfer portal.

=== Arizona ===
Dell'Orso transferred to play for the Arizona Wildcats. In 2024–25, he played in 37 games with 28 starts, averaging 7.2 points and 1.4 rebounds per game. On November 14, 2025, Dell'Orso notched 20 points in a victory versus UCLA. On February 18, 2026, he put up 22 points in a win over BYU. On February 21, Dell'Orso dropped 22 points in an upset win over #2 Houston. In the semifinals of the 2026 Big 12 tournament, he scored a team-high 26 points in a victory over Iowa State.

== Professional career ==
After going undrafted in the 2026 NBA draft, Dell'Orso joined the Sacramento Kings for the 2026 NBA Summer League.

On 6 August 2026, Dell'Orso signed a three-year contract with the Perth Wildcats of the National Basketball League (NBL).

== National team ==
In August 2026, Dell'Orso was named in the Australia men's national basketball team for two FIBA World Cup Asian qualifiers. In November 2026, he was named in the squad for two more Asian qualifiers.
