= Jack Murphy (basketball) =

American basketball coach (born 1979)

Current position
- Title: Associate head coach
- Team: Arizona
- Conference: Big 12

Biographical details
- Born: July 25, 1979 (age 47); Las Vegas, Nevada, U.S.
- Education: Arizona ('02)

Coaching career (HC unless noted)
- 2006–2009: Denver Nuggets (assistant)
- 2009–2012: Memphis (assistant)
- 2012–2019: Northern Arizona
- 2019–present: Arizona (assoc. HC)

Administrative career (AD unless noted)
- 2006: Arizona (dir. of operations)

Head coaching record
- Overall: 78–149
- Tournaments: 4–1 (CIT)

Jack Murphy (born July 25, 1979) is an American college basketball coach who is currently the associate head coach for the Arizona Wildcats of the Big 12 Conference. Previously, he had been an assistant at the University of Memphis.

Prior to serving on the Memphis staff, Murphy was an advance scout and video coordinator for the Denver Nuggets of the National Basketball Association (NBA). Born in Las Vegas, Nevada, Murphy served in several roles at Arizona from 1998 to 2006, beginning as a student manager and eventually moving to recruiting coordinator, video analyst, and director of operations. During this time, he worked with former Memphis head coach Josh Pastner on the staff of Hall of Fame coach Lute Olson. In Murphy's time at Arizona, the Wildcats made eight straight NCAA tournament appearances, reaching the national championship game in 2001. Arizona also posted 20 or more wins in each of Murphy's eight years with the program.

After being promoted to Director of Basketball Operations at Arizona in 2006, Murphy was hired by the Nuggets, where he provided scouting information on upcoming opponents, as well as organizing off-season workout sessions for players. During his time at Arizona and Denver, Murphy developed relationships with many current NBA stars, including Gilbert Arenas, Luke Walton, Allen Iverson, Carmelo Anthony, Marcus Camby, Chauncey Billups and Kenyon Martin.

Murphy was hired by Memphis on June 3, 2009.

On April 12, 2012, Murphy was announced as the new head coach at Northern Arizona. The Lumberjacks were coming off a disastrous 2011–12 season which saw their head coach resign in December and ended with a 16-game losing streak.

Murphy left Northern Arizona on June 2, 2019, to become the top assistant at his alma mater of Arizona, leaving NAU with a 78–149 record in 7 seasons. The Lumberjacks named assistant Burcar as interim head coach for the 2019–20 season.

== Head coaching record ==
Record table
Season	Team	Overall	Conference	Standing	Postseason
Northern Arizona Lumberjacks (Big Sky Conference) (2012–2019)
2012–13	Northern Arizona	11–21	8–12	6th	
2013–14	Northern Arizona	15–17	12–8	T–2nd	
2014–15	Northern Arizona	23–15	13–5	T–3rd	CIT Runner-up
2015–16	Northern Arizona	5–25	3–15	T–11th	
2016–17	Northern Arizona	9–23	6–12	10th	
2017–18	Northern Arizona	5–27	2–16	12th	
2018–19	Northern Arizona	10–21	8–12	T–8th	
Northern Arizona:		78–149 (.344)	52–80 (.394)		
Total:		78–149 (.344)			
