= 2026 College Basketball Crown =

College basketball tournament

- Season: 2025–26
- Teams: 8
- Finals site: T-Mobile Arena, Paradise, Nevada
- Champions: West Virginia (1st title)
- Runner-up: Oklahoma (1st title game)
- Semifinalists: Baylor (1st semifinal); Creighton (1st semifinal)
- Winning coach: Ross Hodge (1st title)
- MVP: Honor Huff (West Virginia)
- Attendance: 10,642 (tournament); 3,109 (final)
- Top scorer: Honor Huff (West Virginia) (72 points)

The 2026 College Basketball Crown (CBC) was a single-elimination, fully-bracketed men's college basketball postseason tournament featuring eight National Collegiate Athletic Association (NCAA) Division I teams not selected to participate in the NCAA Division I men's basketball tournament. The tournament commenced on April 1 and concluded on April 5.

All games were played on the Las Vegas Strip in Paradise, Nevada, with the quarterfinal games at the MGM Grand Garden Arena and the semifinal and final games at T-Mobile Arena. The quarterfinal games aired on FS1 with the semifinal and final games broadcast on FOX.

The West Virginia University Mountaineers defeated the University of Oklahoma Sooners 89–82, in overtime, to claim the championship. The All-Tournament Team was composed of Cameron Carr (Baylor), Jasen Green (Creighton), Honor Huff (West Virginia), Brenan Lorient (West Virginia) and Nijel Pack (Oklahoma); Huff was also selected the Most Valuable Player.

== Participating teams ==
Automatic bids were offered to the top two available teams in the NCAA Evaluation Tool (NET) rankings from each of the Big East, Big Ten, and Big 12 conferences as of the close of conference-tournament play on Selection Sunday, March 15, 2026. The remaining two teams in the bracket were at-large selections made by tournament organizers.

The NET rankings of the available Big East, Big Ten, and Big 12 teams through the finish of play on March 15, 2026, are summarized in the tables below. Teams in bold accepted a bid; teams in italics were extended an automatic bid but rejected it.

Big East Conference
Team	NET rank
Seton Hall	53
Providence	80
**Creighton**	83
Butler	84
Georgetown	90
Marquette	93
Xavier	97
DePaul	102

Big Ten Conference
Team	NET rank
Indiana	41
Washington	57
Northwestern	65
USC	79
**Minnesota**	80
Oregon	109
**Rutgers**	134
Maryland	138
Penn State	142

Big 12 Conference
Team	NET rank
Cincinnati	49
**Baylor**	50
**West Virginia**	59
Arizona State	73
Oklahoma State	74
Colorado	76
Kansas State	100
Utah	132

=== Accepted bids ===
The teams accepting tournament bids are shown below. Team records are prior to the start of the tournament, and NET rankings are as of March 16, 2026.

Team	Conference	Overall record	NET rank	Bid type	Appearance	Last bid
Baylor	Big 12	16–16 (.500)	50	Automatic	1st	Never
Colorado	Big 12	17–15 (.531)	76	At-large	2nd	2025
Creighton	Big East	15–17 (.469)	83	Automatic	1st	Never
Minnesota	Big Ten	15–17 (.469)	81	Automatic	1st	Never
Oklahoma	Southeastern	19–15 (.559)	48	At-large	1st	Never
Rutgers	Big Ten	14–19 (.424)	134	Automatic	1st	Never
Stanford	Atlantic Coast	20–12 (.625)	61	At-large	1st	Never
West Virginia	Big 12	18–14 (.563)	59	Automatic	1st	Never

NOTE: only one of the Big East's two automatic bids was accepted, necessitating the subsequent awarding of a third at-large bid.

=== Rejected bids ===
- Cincinnati
- Indiana
- Seton Hall

== Schedule ==
Game	Time	Matchup	Score	Box score	Attendance	Television
Quarterfinals – April 1
1	5:00 p.m.	Oklahoma vs. Colorado	90–86 ^{OT}		2,276	FS1
2	7:30 p.m.	Baylor vs. Minnesota	67–48		2,276	FS1
Quarterfinals – April 2
3	5:00 p.m.	Stanford vs. West Virginia	77–82 ^{OT}		2,310	FS1
4	7:30 p.m.	Rutgers vs. Creighton	69–82		2,310	FS1
Semifinals – April 4
5	10:30 a.m.	Oklahoma vs. Baylor	82–69		2,947	FOX
6	1:00 p.m.	West Virginia vs. Creighton	87–70		2,947	FOX
Final – April 5
7	2:30 p.m.	Oklahoma vs. West Virginia	82–89 ^{OT}		3,109	FOX
Game times are Pacific Daylight Time.

== Bracket ==
Quarterfinals; MGM Grand Garden Arena; April 1 & 2 FS1
Oklahoma	90
Colorado	86 OT
Baylor	67
Minnesota	48
Stanford	77 OT
West Virginia	82
Rutgers	69
Creighton	82

Semifinals; T-Mobile Arena; April 4 FOX
Oklahoma	82
Baylor	69
West Virginia	87
Creighton	70

Final; T-Mobile Arena; April 5 FOX
Oklahoma	82 OT
West Virginia	89

== See also ==
- 2026 NCAA Division I men's basketball tournament
- 2026 National Invitation Tournament
