= Ebuka Okorie =

American basketball player (born 2007)

No. 23 – Detroit Pistons
- Position: Point guard
- Conference: NBA

Personal information
- Born: April 10, 2007 (age 19) Nashua, New Hampshire, U.S.
- Listed height: 6 ft 2 in (1.88 m)
- Listed weight: 185 lb (84 kg)

Career information
- High school: Brewster Academy (Wolfeboro, New Hampshire)
- College: Stanford (2025–2026)
- NBA draft: 2026: 1st round, 17th overall pick
- Drafted by: Oklahoma City Thunder
- Playing career: 2026–present

Career history
- 2026–present: Detroit Pistons
- 2026–present: →Motor City Cruise

Career highlights
- First-team All-ACC (2026); ACC All-Rookie team (2026)
- Stats at NBA.com
- Stats at Basketball Reference

Chukwuebuka Charles Okorie (born April 10, 2007) is an American professional basketball player for the Detroit Pistons of the National Basketball Association (NBA). He played college basketball for the Stanford Cardinal, where he set multiple Cardinal freshman records, including the most points scored in a career debut and most games of 30+ points by an underclassman.

Okorie was selected with the 17th overall pick in the 2026 NBA Draft by the Oklahoma City Thunder, subsequently traded to the Memphis Grizzlies and then to the Detroit Pistons.

== Early life and high school ==
Okorie is of Nigerian descent, raised in Nashua, New Hampshire. He attended Cushing Academy for 3 years, then transferred to Brewster Academy in Wolfeboro, New Hampshire for his senior year. Initially, Okorie committed to play college basketball for the Harvard Crimson. But after his senior season where he was named the New Hampshire Boys Gatorade Player of the Year, he flipped his commitment to play for the Stanford Cardinal.

== College career ==
Okorie entered his true freshman season as a starter for the Cardinal. In his collegiate debut on November 4, 2025, he put up 26 points in a victory over Portland State, a freshman debut record for the Cardinal. On November 8, Okorie dropped 29 points in a win versus Montana. On November 11, he recorded 21 points and three assists in a win over Montana State. On November 18, Okorie scored 26 points, while adding five assists in a victory against Louisiana. On November 27, he dropped 25 points in a win against Minnesota. In December 20, Okorie set the Cardinal single-game record for most points scored by a freshman with 32 in a victory over Colorado. On December 27, he dropped 30 points in a win versus Cal State Northridge. On January 7, 2026, Okorie dropped 31 points and six assists, including the game-winning three in a victory over Virginia Tech. On January 16, he scored a then career-high 36 points and nine assists in an upset victory over North Carolina. On February 7, he led the Cardinal to a 23 point victory with a college career-high 40 points against Georgia Tech, breaking his own previous single-game scoring record for a Cardinal freshman. Okorie led the Atlantic Coast Conference in scoring with 23.2 points per game as well as 3.6 rebounds, 3.6 assists and 1.6 steals per game. He set a new single-season record for 30 plus point games by an ACC freshman, with eight. He was a First Team All-ACC selection as well as being an honorable mention All-American and being named to the ACC All-Rookie team. Following the season, Okorie declared for the 2026 NBA draft.

== Professional career ==
On June 23, 2026, Okorie was selected 17th overall by the Oklahoma City Thunder in the 2026 NBA draft. He was then traded to the Memphis Grizzlies, who afterward traded him to the Detroit Pistons for three future second round picks and their original spot at pick 21 (Karim López).

On November 11, 2026, Okorie was sent down to the Piston's G-League team, the Motor City Cruise.

== Career statistics ==
Legend
GP	Games played	GS	Games started	MPG	Minutes per game
FG%	Field goal percentage	3P%	3-point field goal percentage	FT%	Free throw percentage
RPG	Rebounds per game	APG	Assists per game	SPG	Steals per game
BPG	Blocks per game	PPG	Points per game	**Bold**	Career high

=== College ===
Year	Team	GP	GS	MPG	FG%	3P%	FT%	RPG	APG	SPG	BPG	PPG
2025–26	Stanford	31	31	35.1	.465	.354	.832	3.6	3.6	1.6	.3	23.2
