= 2025–26 Baylor Bears men's basketball team =

American college basketball season

2025–26 Baylor Bears men's basketball

College Basketball Crown, Semifinal
- Conference: Big 12 Conference
- Record: 17–17 (6–12 Big 12)
- Head coach: Scott Drew (23rd season)
- Associate head coach: Ron Sanchez (1st season)
- Assistant coaches: Tweety Carter (2nd season); Steve Henson (2nd season); Jared Nuness (4th season); Melvin Hunt (2nd season)
- Offensive scheme: Motion
- Base defense: No-Middle
- Home arena: Foster Pavilion

2025–26 Big 12 men's basketball standings
	Conf.				Overall
Team	W		L	PCT	W		L	PCT
No. 3 Arizona †	16	–	2	.889	36	–	3	.923
No. 7 Houston	14	–	4	.778	30	–	7	.811
No. 20 Kansas	12	–	6	.667	24	–	11	.686
No. 21 Texas Tech	12	–	6	.667	23	–	11	.676
No. 8 Iowa State	12	–	6	.667	29	–	8	.784
TCU	11	–	7	.611	23	–	12	.657
West Virginia	9	–	9	.500	21	–	14	.600
UCF	9	–	9	.500	21	–	12	.636
Cincinnati	9	–	9	.500	18	–	15	.545
BYU	9	–	9	.500	23	–	12	.657
Colorado	7	–	11	.389	17	–	16	.515
Arizona State	7	–	11	.389	17	–	16	.515
Baylor	6	–	12	.333	17	–	17	.500
Oklahoma State	6	–	12	.333	20	–	15	.571
Kansas State	3	–	15	.167	12	–	20	.375
Utah	2	–	16	.111	10	–	22	.313
† 2026 Big 12 tournament winner Rankings from AP poll

The 2025–26 Baylor Bears men's basketball team represented Baylor University during the 2025–26 NCAA Division I men's basketball season, the Bears' 120th season. The Bears, members of the Big 12 Conference, played their home games at Foster Pavilion. They were led by 23rd-year head coach Scott Drew.

== Previous season ==
The Bears finished the 2024–25 season 20–15, 10–10 in Big 12 play to finish in a tie for seventh place. They lost in the quarterfinals of the Big 12 tournament to Texas Tech. They received an at-large bid to the NCAA tournament as the number nine seed in the East Region, where they defeated Mississippi State in the first round before losing in the second round to Duke.

== Offseason ==
=== Departures ===
Baylor Departures
Name	Number	Pos.	Height	Weight	Year	Hometown	Reason for Departure
V. J. Edgecombe	7	G	6'5"	180	Fr.	Bimini, Bahamas	Drafted by the Philadelphia 76ers
Yanis Ndjonga	41	F	6'8"	210	RS-So.	Yaounde, Cameroon	Transferred to McNeese
Jason Asemota	5	F	6'8"	190	Fr.	Lynn, MA	Transferred to Boston College
Langston Love	13	G	6'4"	190	RS-Jr.	Universal City, TX	Transferred to Georgetown
Jalen Celestine	32	G	6'6"	185	Sr.	Ajax, Ontario	Transferred to Cincinnati
Rob Wright III	1	G	6'1"	180	Fr.	Wilmington, DE	Transferred to BYU
Josh Ojianwuna	17	F	6'10"	230	Jr.	Asaba, Nigeria	Transferred to Ohio State

=== Incoming transfers ===
Incoming Transfers
Name	Number	Pos.	Height	Weight	Year	Hometown	Previous School
Caden Powell	44	C	6'2"	180	Sr.	Waco, TX	Transferred from Rice
Juslin Bodo Bodo	21	C	6'11"	225	Jr.	Castaic, CA	Transferred from High Point
Michael Rataj	12	G	6'9"	220	Sr.	Augsburg, Germany	Transferred from Oregon State
Isaac Williams	10	G	6'1"	165	So.	Dallas, TX	Transferred from Texas A&M–Corpus Christi
Obi Agbim	5	G	6'3"	180	Gr.	Aurora, CO	Transferred from Wyoming
JJ White	1	G	6'2"	180	Gr.	Norman, OK	Transferred from Omaha
Dan Skillings Jr.	0	G	6'5"	180	Sr.	Philadelphia, PA	Transferred from Cincinnati
Will Kuykendall	2	G	6'2"	175	RS-So.	Santa Maria, CA	Transferred from Arizona

=== Recruiting classes ===
==== 2024 recruiting class ====
College recruiting information
Name	Hometown	School	Height	Weight	Commit date
Tounde Yessoufou; SF	Santa Maria, CA	Saint Joseph High School	6 ft 5 in (1.96 m)	215 lb (98 kg)	Oct 2, 2024
Tounde Yessoufou; SF	Recruit ratings: Scout: Rivals: 247Sports: ESPN: (94)				
Andre Iguodala Jr. PF	Branson, MO	Link Academy	6 ft 7 in (2.01 m)	170 lb (77 kg)	Apr 18, 2025
Andre Iguodala Jr. PF	Recruit ratings: Scout: Rivals: 247Sports: ESPN: (80)				
Drew Perry; G	Dallas, TX	Lakehill Prep	5 ft 10 in (1.78 m)	160 lb (73 kg)	
Drew Perry; G	Recruit ratings: No ratings found				
Mayo Soyoye; C	Atlanta, GA	Blair Academy	6 ft 10 in (2.08 m)	235 lb (107 kg)	
Mayo Soyoye; C	Recruit ratings: No ratings found				
Maikcol Perez; F	Bassano del Grappa, Italy	Orange1 Bassano	6 ft 8 in (2.03 m)	215 lb (98 kg)	
Maikcol Perez; F	Recruit ratings: No ratings found				
Overall recruit ranking: Rivals: 21 247Sports: 21 ESPN: NA
Note: In many cases, Scout, Rivals, 247Sports, On3, and ESPN may conflict in their listings of height and weight.; In these cases, the average was taken. ESPN grades are on a 100-point scale.; Sources: "Baylor 2025 Basketball Commitments". Rivals.; "2025 Baylor Bears Recruiting Class". ESPN.; "2025 Team Ranking". Rivals.

== Preseason ==
The Big 12 preseason coaches poll was released on October 16, 2025. All awards were voted on by the league's 16 head coaches, who could not vote for their own team or players. The Big 12 preseason media poll was released on October 30, 2025.

Big 12 Preseason Coaches Poll

	Big 12 Coaches	Points
1.	Houston	224 (12)
2.	BYU	204 (1)
3.	Texas Tech	200
4.	Arizona	179 (1)
5.	Iowa State	170
6.	Kansas	163
7.	Baylor	137
8.	Cincinnati	120
9.	Kansas State	117
10.	TCU	90
11.	West Virginia	79
12.	Oklahoma State	77
13.	Utah	50
14.	UCF	39
15.	Colorado	37
16.	Arizona State	34
Reference: (#) first-place votes

Big 12 Preseason Media Poll

	Big 12 Media
1.	Houston
2.	Texas Tech
3.	BYU
4.	Arizona
5.	Iowa State
6.	Kansas
7.	Baylor
8.	Kansas State
9.	Cincinnati
10.	TCU
11.	West Virginia
12.	Oklahoma State
13.	Utah
14.	UCF
15.	Colorado
16.	Arizona State

== Roster ==
2025–26 Baylor Bears men's basketball team
Players
Coaches

Pos.	#	Name	Height	Weight	Year	Previous school	Hometown
G/F	0	Dan Skillings	6 ft 6 in (1.98 m)	210 lb (95 kg)	RS Sr	Cincinnati	Blackwood, New Jersey
G	1	JJ White	6 ft 1 in (1.85 m)	193 lb (88 kg)	Sr	Omaha	Lawrenceville, Georgia
G	2	Will Kuykendall	6 ft 2 in (1.88 m)	176 lb (80 kg)	So	Arizona	Santa Maria, California
G	3	Drew Perry	5 ft 10 in (1.78 m)	162 lb (73 kg)	Fr	Hillcrest Prep	Dallas, Texas
G	5	Obi Agbim	6 ft 3 in (1.91 m)	183 lb (83 kg)	Sr	Wyoming	Lynn, Massachusetts
G	10	Isaac Williams IV	6 ft 1 in (1.85 m)	192 lb (87 kg)	So	Texas A&M-Corpus Christi	Oklahoma City, Oklahoma
F	12	Michael Rataj	6 ft 8 in (2.03 m)	230 lb (104 kg)	Jr	Oregon State	Augsburg, Germany
C	15	Mayo Soyoye	6 ft 10 in (2.08 m)	234 lb (106 kg)	Fr	Atl hs	Atlanta, Georgia
F	21	Juslin Bodo Bodo	6 ft 7 in (2.01 m)	210 lb (95 kg)	RS So	High Point	Yaoundé, Cameroon
G	24	Tounde Yessoufou	6 ft 5 in (1.96 m)	215 lb (98 kg)	Fr	Montverde Academy	Cotonou, Benin
G	43	Cameron Carr	6 ft 5 in (1.96 m)	175 lb (79 kg)	GS	Tennessee	Ajax, Ontario
F/C	44	Caden Powell	6 ft 9 in (2.06 m)	224 lb (102 kg)	Sr	Rice	Waco, Texas
C	46	James Nnaji	7 ft 0 in (2.13 m)	250 lb (113 kg)	Fr	NBA Global Academy	Makurdi, Nigeria

Head coach

- Scott Drew (Butler)

Assistant coach(es)

- Ron Sanchez (SUNY Oneonta)
- Tweety Carter (Baylor)
- Steve Henson (Kansas State)
- Jared Nuness (Valparaiso)
- Melvin Hunt (Baylor)

Legend

- (C) Team captain
- (S) Suspended
- (I) Ineligible
- (W) Walk-on
- Injured
- Current redshirt

Roster
Last update: October 15, 2025

== Schedule and results ==
Date time, TV	Rank^{#}	Opponent^{#}	Result	Record	High points	High rebounds	High assists	Site (attendance) city, state
Exhibition
October 10, 2025*; 4:00 p.m.		Grand Canyon	W 79–74		21 – Yessoufou	11 – Skillings Jr.	6 – Agbim	Foster Pavilion; Waco, TX
October 26. 2025*; 12:00 p.m., B1G+		vs. Indiana	L 74–76		18 – Carr	9 – Tied	3 – Tied	Gainbridge Fieldhouse (4,507); Indianapolis, IN
Regular season
November 3, 2025*; 7:00 p.m., ESPN+		UT Rio Grande Valley	W 96–81	1–0	28 – Carr	7 – Tied	5 – Agbim	Foster Pavilion (6,422); Waco, TX
November 9, 2025*; 7:30 p.m., ESPN		Washington	W 78–69	2–0	16 – Carr	10 – Powell	7 – Agbim	Foster Pavilion (6,542); Waco, TX
November 14, 2025*; 8:00 p.m., ESPN+		Tarleton State	W 94–81	3–0	24 – Carr	7 – Skillings Jr.	5 – Tied	Foster Pavilion (7,119); Waco, TX
November 24, 2025*; 1:00 p.m., truTV		vs. Creighton; Players Era Festival Game 1	W 81–74	4–0	21 – Carr	9 – Carr	5 – Rataj	Michelob Ultra Arena; Las Vegas, NV
November 25, 2025*; 4:00 p.m., truTV		vs. No. 14 St. John's; Players Era Festival Game 2	L 81–96	4−1	27 – Carr	12 – Rataj	4 – Rataj	Michelob Ultra Arena; Las Vegas, NV
November 26, 2025*; 9:30 p.m., TruTV		vs. San Diego State; Players Era Festival Consolation Game	W 91–81	5–1	18 – Yessoufou	8 – Skillings Jr.	5 – Skillings Jr.	Michelob Ultra Arena; Las Vegas, NV
December 2, 2025*; 7:00 p.m., ESPN+		Sacramento State	W 110–88	6–1	27 – Yessoufou	14 – Skillings Jr.	4 – Tied	Foster Pavilion (7,082); Waco, TX
December 6, 2025*; 3:30 p.m., CBS		at Memphis	L 71–78	6–2	22 – Yessoufou	10 – Carr	4 – Williams	FedEx Forum (11,392); Memphis, TN
December 10, 2025*; 11:00 a.m., ESPN+		Norfolk State	W 97–67	7–2	19 – Carr	8 – Skillings	7 – Williams	Foster Pavilion (4,584); Waco, TX
December 19, 2025*; 7:00 p.m., ESPN+		Alcorn State	W 113–56	8–2	24 – Carr	10 – Rataj	5 – Rataj	Foster Pavilion (7,019); Waco, TX
December 21, 2025*; 12:00 p.m., TNT & truTV		Southern	W 111–67	9–2	28 – Yessoufou	15 – Powell	6 – Tied	Foster Pavilion (7,065); Waco, TX
December 29, 2025*; 3:00 p.m., ESPN+		Arlington Baptist	W 124–61	10–2	28 – Yessoufou	12 – Rataj	10 – Carr	Foster Pavilion (7,018); Waco, TX
January 3, 2026; 1:00 p.m., TNT		at TCU	L 63–69	10–3 (0–1)	17 – Carr	5 – Yessoufou	5 – Agbim	Schollmaier Arena (6,892); Fort Worth, TX
January 7, 2026; 7:00 p.m., Peacock		No. 3 Iowa State	L 60–70	10–4 (0–2)	17 – Carr	11 – Powell	2 – Tied	Foster Pavilion (7,287); Waco, TX
January 10, 2026; 12:00 p.m., Peacock		No. 7 Houston	L 55–77	10–5 (0–3)	18 – Carr	7 – Nnaji	5 – Williams	Foster Pavilion (7,335); Waco, TX
January 13, 2026; 8:00 p.m., CBSSN		at Oklahoma State	W 94–79	11–5 (1–3)	23 – Yessoufou	8 – Rataj	6 – Carr	Gallagher-Iba Arena (7,514); Stillwater, OK
January 16, 2026; 7:00 p.m., FOX		at Kansas	L 62–80	11–6 (1–4)	24 – Carr	7 – Yessoufou	2 – Tied	Allen Fieldhouse (15,300); Lawrence, KS
January 20, 2026; 8:00 p.m., Peacock		No. 12 Texas Tech	L 73–92	11–7 (1–5)	12 – Skillings	9 – Carr	5 – Carr	Foster Pavilion (7,349); Waco, TX
January 24, 2026; 5:00 p.m., ESPN		TCU	L 90–97	11–8 (1–6)	21 – Tied	6 – Carr	6 – Carr	Foster Pavilion (7,124); Waco, TX
January 28, 2026; 5:30 p.m., FS1		at Cincinnati	L 57–67	11–9 (1–7)	16 – Yessoufou	7 – Tied	4 – Carr	Fifth Third Arena (9,982); Cincinnati, OH
January 31, 2026; 3:00 p.m., ESPN2		at West Virginia	W 63–53	12–9 (2–7)	16 – Tied	12 – Carr	4 – Agbim	Hope Coliseum (13,251); Morgantown, WV
February 4, 2026; 5:00 p.m., Peacock		Colorado	W 86–67	13–9 (3–7)	27 – Yessoufou	8 – Carr	6 – Carr	Foster Pavilion (7,012); Waco, TX
February 7, 2026; 1:00 p.m., ESPN		at No. 7 Iowa State	L 69–72	13–10 (3–8)	24 – Carr	8 – Rataj	3 – Carr	Hilton Coliseum (14,267); Ames, IA
February 10, 2026; 6:00 p.m., ESPN2		No. 22 BYU	L 94–99	13–11 (3–9)	37 – Yessoufou	8 – Carr	7 – Williams	Foster Pavilion (7,371); Waco, TX
February 14, 2026*; 3:00 p.m., ESPN		vs. No. 24 Louisville	L 71–82	13–12	20 – Williams IV	5 – Agbim	3 – Tied	Dickies Arena (3,314); Fort Worth, TX
February 17, 2026; 8:00 p.m., ESPN2		at Kansas State	L 74–90	13–13 (3–10)	16 – Williams	8 – Skillings	6 – Williams	Bramlage Coliseum (6,789); Manhattan, KS
February 21, 2026; 3:00 p.m., ESPN2		Arizona State	W 73–68	14–13 (4–10)	16 – Agbim	7 – Powell	5 – Williams	Foster Pavilion (7,044); Waco, TX
February 24, 2026; 8:00 p.m., ESPN2		No. 2 Arizona	L 80–87	14–14 (4–11)	26 – Carr	6 – Rataj	5 – Williams	Foster Pavilion (7,126); Waco, TX
February 28, 2026; 7:00 p.m., FS1		at UCF	W 87–86	15–14 (5–11)	26 – Carr	8 – Yessoufou	7 – Agbim	Addition Financial Arena (8,735); Orlando, FL
March 4, 2026; 8:00 p.m., ESPN2		at No. 7 Houston	L 64–77	15–15 (5–12)	20 – Yessoufou	12 – Yessoufou	6 – Williams	Fertitta Center (7,035); Houston, TX
March 7, 2026; 4:00 p.m., Peacock		Utah	W 101–75	16–15 (6–12)	26 – Yessoufou	5 – Yessoufou	5 – Powell	Foster Pavilion (7,011); Waco, TX
Big 12 tournament
March 10, 2026; 11:30 a.m., ESPN+	(13)	vs. (12) Arizona State; First round	L 79−83	16−16	25 – Carr	7 – Carr	4 – Williams	T-Mobile Center (7,238); Kansas City, MO
College Basketball Crown
April 1, 2026*; 9:30 p.m., FS1		vs. Minnesota; Quarterfinal	W 67–48	17–16	19 – Yessoufou	9 – Carr	4 – Williams IV	MGM Grand Garden Arena; Paradise, NV
April 4, 2026*; 12:30 p.m., FOX		vs. Oklahoma; Semifinal	L 69–82	17–17	15 – Tied	12 – Carr	4 – Carr	T-Mobile Arena; Paradise, NV
*Non-conference game. ^{#}Rankings from AP poll. (#) Tournament seedings in parentheses. All times are in Central Time.

== Rankings ==
Ranking movements Legend: ██ Increase in ranking ██ Decrease in ranking — = Not ranked RV = Received votes
	Week																				
Poll	Pre	1	2	3	4	5	6	7	8	9	10	11	12	13	14	15	16	17	18	19	Final
AP	RV	RV	RV	RV	RV	—	—	RV	RV	—	—	—	—	—	—	—	—	—	—	—	—
Coaches	RV	RV	RV	RV	RV	RV	—	—	—	—	—	—	—	—	—	—	—	—	—	—	—

*AP did not release a week 8 poll.
