= 2025–26 TCU Horned Frogs men's basketball team =

American college basketball season

2025–26 TCU Horned Frogs men's basketball

Rady Children's Invitational champions

NCAA tournament, Second round
- Conference: Big 12 Conference
- Record: 23–12 (11–7 Big 12)
- Head coach: Jamie Dixon (10th season)
- Associate head coach: Tony Benford
- Assistant coaches: Duane Broussard; Jamie McNeilly
- Home arena: Schollmaier Arena

2025–26 Big 12 men's basketball standings
	Conf.				Overall
Team	W		L	PCT	W		L	PCT
No. 3 Arizona †	16	–	2	.889	36	–	3	.923
No. 7 Houston	14	–	4	.778	30	–	7	.811
No. 20 Kansas	12	–	6	.667	24	–	11	.686
No. 21 Texas Tech	12	–	6	.667	23	–	11	.676
No. 8 Iowa State	12	–	6	.667	29	–	8	.784
TCU	11	–	7	.611	23	–	12	.657
West Virginia	9	–	9	.500	21	–	14	.600
UCF	9	–	9	.500	21	–	12	.636
Cincinnati	9	–	9	.500	18	–	15	.545
BYU	9	–	9	.500	23	–	12	.657
Colorado	7	–	11	.389	17	–	16	.515
Arizona State	7	–	11	.389	17	–	16	.515
Baylor	6	–	12	.333	17	–	17	.500
Oklahoma State	6	–	12	.333	20	–	15	.571
Kansas State	3	–	15	.167	12	–	20	.375
Utah	2	–	16	.111	10	–	22	.313
† 2026 Big 12 tournament winner Rankings from AP poll

The 2025–26 TCU Horned Frogs men's basketball team represented Texas Christian University during the 2025–26 NCAA Division I men's basketball season. The Horned Frogs, led by tenth-year head coach Jamie Dixon, played their home games at Schollmaier Arena located in Fort Worth, Texas as a member of the Big 12 Conference. For the first time since the 2000-01 season, the Horned Frogs finished with a winning in-conference record.

== Previous season ==
The Horned Frogs finished the 2024–25 season 16–16, 9–11 in Big 12 play to finish in a tie for ninth place. Due to a tiebreaker, as the No. 9 seed in the Big 12 tournament, they lost to Colorado in the first round. They did not receive any at-large bids to the post-season NCAA basketball tournaments.

== Offseason ==
=== Departures ===
Name	Number	Pos.	Height	Weight	Year	Hometown	Reason for departure
Vasean Allette	3	G	6'2"	190	Junior	Scarborough, Ontario	Transferred to UTSA
Frankie Collins	11	G	6'2"	200	Graduate senior	Sacramento, CA	Transferred to Vanderbilt
Cole Despie	35	G	6'4"	190	Graduate senior	San Jose, CA	Out of eligibility
Isaiah Manning	1	F	6'8"	220	RS sophomore	Mansfield, TX	Transferred to Sam Houston
Ernest Udeh Jr.	8	C	6'11"	260	Senior	Orlando, FL	Transferred to Miami (FL)
Brendan Wenzel	0	G	6'8"	215	Senior	San Antonio, TX	Out of eligibility
Trazarien White	13	F	6'6"	185	Senior	Mansfield, TX	Out of eligibility

=== Incoming transfers ===
Name	Number	Pos.	Height	Weight	Year	Hometown	Previous school
Xavier Edmonds	24	F	6'8"	245	Junior	Long Beach, CA	Salt Lake Community College
Brock Harding	2	G	6'0"	160	Junior	Moline, IL	Iowa
Liutauras Lelevicius	3	G	6'7"	225	Junior	Kaunas, Lithuania	Oregon State
Jayden Pierre	1	G	6'0"	177	Senior	Elizabeth, N.J.	Providence
Vianney Salatchoum	23	C	6'10"	215	Senior	Yaounde, Cameroon	FIU
Tanner Toolson	55	G	6'5"	195	Junior	Vancouver, WA	Utah Valley

=== Recruiting classes ===
==== 2025 recruiting class ====
College recruiting
Name	Hometown	School	Height	Weight	Commit date
Kayden Edwards; G	Fort Worth, Texas	Duncanville High School	6 ft 2 in (1.88 m)	170 lb (77 kg)	Sep 18, 2024
Kayden Edwards; G	Recruit ratings: Scout: Rivals: 247Sports: ESPN: (84)				
Overall recruit ranking:
Note: In many cases, Scout, Rivals, 247Sports, On3, and ESPN may conflict in their listings of height and weight.; In these cases, the average was taken. ESPN grades are on a 100-point scale.; Sources: "2025 TCU Commits". Rivals.; "2025 Team Ranking". Rivals.

== Preseason ==
The Big 12 preseason coaches poll was released on October 16, 2025. All awards were voted on by the league's 16 head coaches, who could not vote for their own team or players. The Big 12 preseason media poll was released on October 30, 2025.

Big 12 Preseason Coaches Poll

	Big 12 Coaches	Points
1.	Houston	224 (12)
2.	BYU	204 (1)
3.	Texas Tech	200
4.	Arizona	179 (1)
5.	Iowa State	170
6.	Kansas	163
7.	Baylor	137
8.	Cincinnati	120
9.	Kansas State	117
10.	TCU	90
11.	West Virginia	79
12.	Oklahoma State	77
13.	Utah	50
14.	UCF	39
15.	Colorado	37
16.	Arizona State	34
Reference: (#) first-place votes

Big 12 Preseason Media Poll

	Big 12 Media
1.	Houston
2.	Texas Tech
3.	BYU
4.	Arizona
5.	Iowa State
6.	Kansas
7.	Baylor
8.	Kansas State
9.	Cincinnati
10.	TCU
11.	West Virginia
12.	Oklahoma State
13.	Utah
14.	UCF
15.	Colorado
16.	Arizona State

== Roster ==
2025–26 TCU Horned Frogs men's basketball team
Players
Coaches

Pos.	#	Name	Height	Weight	Year	Previous school	Hometown
F	00	Jace Posey	6 ft 5 in (1.96 m)	206 lb (93 kg)	RS So	Strake Jesuit College Prep	Houston, Texas
G	1	Jayden Pierre	6 ft 0 in (1.83 m)	175 lb (79 kg)	Sr	Providence	Elizabeth, New Jersey
G	2	Brock Harding	6 ft 0 in (1.83 m)	160 lb (73 kg)	Jr	Iowa	Moline, Illinois
G	3	Liutauras Lelevicius	6 ft 7 in (2.01 m)	225 lb (102 kg)	Jr	Oregon State	Kaunas, Lithuania
F	5	Micah Robinson	6 ft 6 in (1.98 m)	230 lb (104 kg)	So	Oak Hill Academy (VA)	Kansas City, Missouri
G	6	Ashton Simmons	6 ft 3 in (1.91 m)	200 lb (91 kg)	RS Fr	West Brook High School	Beaumont, Texas
G	7	Kayden Edwards	6 ft 2 in (1.88 m)	1700 lb (771 kg)	Fr	Duncanville High School	Fort Worth, Texas
G	8	R.J. Jones	6 ft 2 in (1.88 m)	190 lb (86 kg)	RS So	Kansas State	Denton, Texas
F	15	David Punch	6 ft 7 in (2.01 m)	245 lb (111 kg)	So	Harker Heights High School	Harker Heights, Texas
C	22	Adam Stewart (W)	6 ft 11 in (2.11 m)	235 lb (107 kg)	So	Salt Lake Academy (UT)	Waller, Texas
C	23	Vianney Salatchoum	6 ft 10 in (2.08 m)	215 lb (98 kg)	Sr	FIU	Yaounde, Cameroon
F	24	Xavier Edmonds	6 ft 8 in (2.03 m)	245 lb (111 kg)	Sr	Bishop Montgomery High School	Long Beach, California
G	30	Drew McElroy (W)	6 ft 2 in (1.88 m)	175 lb (79 kg)	Jr	Highland Park High School	Dallas, Texas
C	32	Malick Diallo	6 ft 9 in (2.06 m)	240 lb (109 kg)	So	Wasatch Academy	Bamako, Mali
G	33	Trey Stuart (W)	6 ft 2 in (1.88 m)	175 lb (79 kg)	Sr	Brock High School	Weatherford, Texas
G	55	Tanner Toolson	6 ft 5 in (1.96 m)	195 lb (88 kg)	Jr	Utah Valley	Vancouver, Washington

Head coach

- Jamie Dixon (TCU)

Assistant coach(es)

- Tony Benford (Texas Tech)
- Duane Broussard (Bradley)
- Jamie McNeilly (LSU New Orleans)

Legend

- (C) Team captain
- (S) Suspended
- (I) Ineligible
- (W) Walk-on
- Injured
- Current redshirt

Roster

== Schedule and results ==
Date time, TV	Rank^{#}	Opponent^{#}	Result	Record	High points	High rebounds	High assists	Site (attendance) city, state
Exhibition
October 19, 2025*; 3:00 p.m., ESPN+		at Tarleton State	W 88–54		15 – Punch	6 – Punch	4 – Tied	EECU Center (3,309); Stephenville, TX
Non-conference regular season
November 3, 2025*; 7:00 p.m., ESPN+		New Orleans	L 74–78	0–1	19 – Punch	8 – Punch	6 – Harding	Schollmaier Arena (4,741); Fort Worth, TX
November 6, 2025*; 7:00 p.m., TNT/TruTV		Saint Francis (PA)	W 104–63	1–1	25 – Toolson	10 – Robinson	5 – Harding	Schollmaier Arena (4,432); Fort Worth, TX
November 10, 2025*; 7:00 p.m., ESPN+		Lamar	W 78–65	2–1	18 – Pierre	8 – Posey	7 – Harding	Schollmaier Arena (4,567); Fort Worth, TX
November 14, 2025*; 8:00 p.m., ESPN2		No. 6 Michigan	L 63–67	2–2	13 – Harding	6 – Harding	4 – Harding	Schollmaier Arena (6,426); Fort Worth, TX
November 19, 2025*; 7:00 p.m., ESPN		Kansas City	W 81–45	3–2	17 – Pierre	9 – Punch	7 – Punch	Schollmaier Arena (4,484); Fort Worth, TX
November 27, 2025*; 7:00 p.m., FS1		vs. No. 10 Florida; Rady Children's Invitational Semifinal	W 84–80	4–2	21 – Posey	9 – Punch	12 – Harding	Jenny Craig Pavilion (4,955); San Diego, CA
November 28, 2025*; 4:30 p.m., FOX		vs. Wisconsin; Rady Children's Invitational Championship	W 74–63	5–2	17 – Punch	9 – Punch	5 – Harding	Jenny Craig Pavilion; San Diego, CA
December 5, 2025*; 7:00 p.m., ESPN+		Notre Dame	L 85–87 ^{OT}	5–3	20 – Punch	7 – Punch	8 – Harding	Schollmaier Arena (5,706); Fort Worth, TX
December 7, 2025*; 4:30 p.m., ESPN+		vs. North Texas; 2025 USLBM Coast to Coast Challenge	W 65–55	6–3	16 – Edmonds	12 – Punch	4 – Harding	Dickies Arena; Fort Worth, TX
December 15, 2025*; 7:00 p.m., ESPN+		Incarnate Word	W 69–65	7–3	17 – Punch	13 – Punch	4 – Pierre	Schollmaier Arena (4,262); Fort Worth, TX
December 18, 2025*; 7:00 p.m., ESPN+		Oral Roberts	W 72–53	8–3	17 – Punch	6 – Edmonds	4 – Pierre	Schollmaier Arena (4,688); Fort Worth, TX
December 21, 2025*; 3:00 p.m., ESPN+		Florida A&M	W 80–56	9–3	21 – Edmonds	8 – Punch	7 – Harding	Schollmaier Arena (4,962); Fort Worth, TX
December 29, 2025*; 7:00 p.m., ESPN+		Jackson State	W 115–64	10–3	20 – Punch	5 – Tied	10 – Harding	Schollmaier Arena (4,857); Fort Worth, TX
Big 12 regular season
January 3, 2026; 1:00 p.m., TNT		Baylor	W 69–63	11–3 (1–0)	13 – Robinson	10 – Robinson	5 – Harding	Schollmaier Arena (6,892); Fort Worth, TX
January 6, 2026; 8:00 p.m., ESPN		at No. 22 Kansas	L 100–104 ^{OT}	11–4 (1–1)	23 – Lelevicius	9 – Punch	10 – Harding	Allen Fieldhouse (15,300); Lawrence, KS
January 10, 2026; 3:00 p.m., ESPN		No. 1 Arizona	L 73–86	11–5 (1–2)	20 – Toolson	8 – Punch	6 – Harding	Schollmaier Arena (6,082); Fort Worth, TX
January 14, 2026; 10:00 p.m., ESPN2		at No. 11 BYU	L 70–76	11–6 (1–3)	19 – Edmonds	19 – Edmonds	7 – Harding	Marriott Center (17,983); Provo, UT
January 17, 2026; 1:00 p.m., TNT		at Utah	L 79–82	11–7 (1–4)	22 – Punch	6 – Tied	6 – Pierre	Jon M. Huntsman Center (6,544); Salt Lake City, UT
January 20, 2026; 7:00 p.m., ESPN+		Oklahoma State	W 68–65	12–7 (2–4)	22 – Punch	10 – Tied	9 – Harding	Schollmaier Arena (4,942); Fort Worth, TX
January 24, 2026; 5:00 p.m., ESPN		at Baylor	W 97–90	13–7 (3–4)	25 – Pierre	10 – Edmonds	6 – Harding	Foster Pavilion (7,124); Waco, TX
January 28, 2026; 8:00 p.m., ESPN2		No. 10 Houston	L 70–79	13–8 (3–5)	18 – Edmonds	10 – Edmonds	6 – Punch	Schollmaier Arena (6,863); Fort Worth, TX
February 1, 2026; 1:00 p.m., TNT		at Colorado	L 61–87	13–9 (3–6)	13 – Edmonds	12 – Edmonds	3 – Pierre	CU Events Center (6,719); Boulder, CO
February 7, 2026; 1:00 p.m., TNT		Kansas State	W 84–82	14–9 (4–6)	26 – Edmonds	10 – Edmonds	6 – Harding	Schollmaier Arena (5,176); Fort Worth, TX
February 10, 2026; 8:00 p.m., FS1		No. 5 Iowa State	W 62–55	15–9 (5–6)	17 – Tied	9 – Toolson	4 – Punch	Schollmaier Arena (4,944); Fort Worth, TX
February 14, 2026; 11:00 a.m., ESPN2		at Oklahoma State	W 95–92 ^{OT}	16–9 (6–6)	19 – Punch	10 – Edmonds	4 – Tied	Gallagher-Iba Arena (7,098); Stillwater, OK
February 17, 2026; 6:00 p.m., ESPN+		at UCF	L 71–82	16–10 (6–7)	20 – Robinson	10 – Edmonds	3 – Punch	Addition Financial Arena (6,990); Orlando, FL
February 21, 2026; 4:00 p.m., Peacock		West Virginia	W 60–54	17–10 (7–7)	14 – Tied	13 – Edmonds	6 – Harding	Schollmaier Arena (5,556); Fort Worth, TX
February 24, 2026; 8:00 p.m., CBSSN		Arizona State	W 90–78	18–10 (8–7)	21 – Robinson	8 – Robinson	10 – Herding	Schollmaier Arena (5,265); Fort Worth, TX
February 28, 2026; 5:30 p.m., ESPN2		at Kansas State	W 77–68	19–10 (9–7)	15 – Edmonds	13 – Edmonds	5 – Harding	Bramlage Coliseum (8,184); Manhattan, KS
March 3, 2026; 6:00 p.m., FS1		at No. 10 Texas Tech	W 73–65	20–10 (10–7)	20 – Edmonds	12 – Edmonds	4 – Harding	United Supermarkets Arena (15,098); Lubbock, TX
March 7, 2026; 1:00 p.m., TNT		Cincinnati	W 73–63	21–10 (11–7)	18 – Pierre	5 – Pierre	7 – Punch	Schollmaier Arena (6,260); Fort Worth, TX
Big 12 tournament
March 11, 2026; 8:30 p.m., ESPNU	(6)	vs. (14) Oklahoma State; Second round	W 95–88	22–10	26 – Punch	11 – Edmonds	5 – Pierre	T-Mobile Center (12,811); Kansas City, MO
March 12, 2026; 8:30 p.m., ESPN2	(6)	vs. (3) No. 14 Kansas; Quarterfinal	L 73–78	22–11	24 – Punch	10 – Punch	3 – Tied	T-Mobile Center (17,015); Kansas City, MO
NCAA tournament
March 19, 2026*; 11:15 a.m., CBS	(9 E)	vs. (8 E) Ohio State; First round	W 66–64	23–11	18 – Robinson	13 – Punch	3 – Tied	Bon Secours Wellness Arena (13,919); Greenville, SC
March 21, 2026*; 4:15 p.m., CBS	(9 E)	vs. (1 E) No. 1 Duke; Second round	L 58–81	23–12	18 – Robinson	5 – Robinson	6 – Pierre	Bon Secours Wellness Arena (14,178); Greenville, SC
*Non-conference game. ^{#}Rankings from AP Poll. (#) Tournament seedings in parentheses. E=East. All times are in Central Time.

== Rankings ==
Ranking movements Legend: ██ Increase in ranking ██ Decrease in ranking — = Not ranked RV = Received votes
	Week																				
Poll	Pre	1	2	3	4	5	6	7	8	9	10	11	12	13	14	15	16	17	18	19	Final
AP	—	—	—	—	RV	RV	—	—	—	RV	—	—	—	—	—	—	—	RV	RV	RV	RV
Coaches	—	—	—	—	RV	—	—	—	—	—	—	—	—	—	—	—	—	—	—	—	—

*AP did not release a week 8 poll.
