= 2025–26 West Virginia Mountaineers men's basketball team =

American college basketball season

2025–26 West Virginia Mountaineers men's basketball

College Basketball Crown champions
- Conference: Big 12 Conference
- Record: 21–14 (9–9 Big 12)
- Head coach: Ross Hodge (1st season)
- Assistant coaches: Yusuf Ali; Johnny Estelle; Phil Forte; Jase Herl; Andre Shaw
- Home arena: Hope Coliseum

2025–26 Big 12 men's basketball standings
	Conf.				Overall
Team	W		L	PCT	W		L	PCT
No. 3 Arizona †	16	–	2	.889	36	–	3	.923
No. 7 Houston	14	–	4	.778	30	–	7	.811
No. 20 Kansas	12	–	6	.667	24	–	11	.686
No. 21 Texas Tech	12	–	6	.667	23	–	11	.676
No. 8 Iowa State	12	–	6	.667	29	–	8	.784
TCU	11	–	7	.611	23	–	12	.657
West Virginia	9	–	9	.500	21	–	14	.600
UCF	9	–	9	.500	21	–	12	.636
Cincinnati	9	–	9	.500	18	–	15	.545
BYU	9	–	9	.500	23	–	12	.657
Colorado	7	–	11	.389	17	–	16	.515
Arizona State	7	–	11	.389	17	–	16	.515
Baylor	6	–	12	.333	17	–	17	.500
Oklahoma State	6	–	12	.333	20	–	15	.571
Kansas State	3	–	15	.167	12	–	20	.375
Utah	2	–	16	.111	10	–	22	.313
† 2026 Big 12 tournament winner Rankings from AP poll

The 2025–26 West Virginia Mountaineers men's basketball team represented West Virginia University during the 2025–26 NCAA Division I men's basketball season. The Mountaineers were coached by first year head coach Ross Hodge, and played their home games at the Hope Coliseum located in Morgantown, West Virginia as members of the Big 12 Conference.

== Previous season ==
The Mountaineers finished the 2024–25 season 19–13, 10–10 in Big 12 Play to finish in a tie for seventh place. They lost in the first round of the Big 12 tournament to Colorado, 67−60.

=== Departures ===
Name	Pos.	Number	Height	Weight	Previous School	Hometown	Reason for Leaving
Eduardo Andre	0	C	6'11"	240	Graduate Senior	London, England	Out of eligibility
Jake Auer	8	G	6'0"	195	Graduate Senior	Clive, IA	Out of eligibility
Tucker DeVries	12	G/F	6'7"	220	Graduate Senior	Waukee, IA	Transferred to Indiana
Haris Elezovic	22	F	6'8"	235	Senior	Sherbrooke, Quebec, Canada	Transferred to Northeastern
Amani Hansberry	13	F	6'8"	240	Junior	Silver Spring, MD	Transferred to Virginia Tech
Sencire Harris	10	G	6'4"	175	Junior	Canton, OH	Transferred to Cincinnati
Dylan Jay	2	G	6'4"	200	Sophomore	Chelan, WA	Transferred to Pierce College
Ofri Naveh	9	F	6'7"	185	Junior	Neot Golan, Israel	Transferred to Oral Roberts
Toby Okani	5	G	6'8"	210	Graduate Senior	Orange, N.J.	Out of eligibility
Jonathan Powell	11	G	6'6"	190	Sophomore	Centerville, OH	Transferred to North Carolina
Javon Small	7	G	6'3"	190	Senior	South Bend, IN	Drafted by the Memphis Grizzlies
Jayden Stone	14	G	6'4"	185	Senior	Perth, Australia	Transferred to Missouri
Aden Tagaloa-Nelson	4	G	6'1"	200	Junior	Lexington, KY	Transferred to Eastern Kentucky
KJ Tenner	3	G	6'0"	165	Sophomore	Memphis, TN	Transferred to Murray State
Joseph Yesufu	1	G	6'0"	190	Graduate Senior	Bolingbrook, IL	Out of eligibility

=== Incoming transfers ===
Name	Number	Pos.	Height	Weight	Year	Hometown	Previous School
Treysen Eaglestaff	52	G	6'6"	205	GS Senior	Bismarck, N.D.	North Dakota
Jackson Fields	15	F	6'8"	225	Senior	Missouri City, TX	Troy
Jasper Floyd	1	G	6'3"	195	Senior	Tampa, FL	North Texas
Niyol Hauet	21	G	6'4"	180	RS Freshman	Yokohama, Japan	Weber State
Honor Huff	3	G	5'10"	165	Senior	Brooklyn N.Y.	Chattanooga
Brenen Lorient	0	F	6'9"	215	Senior	Ocala, FL	North Texas
Chance Moore	13	G	6'6"	210	GS Senior	Brookhaven, GA	St. Bonaventure
Harlan Obioha	55	C	7'0"	265	Senior	Hoxie, KS	UNC Wilmington
Morris Ugusuk	23	G	6'4"	180	Junior	Helsinki, Finland	South Carolina

=== Recruiting classes ===
==== 2025 recruiting class ====
College recruiting
Name	Hometown	School	Height	Weight	Commit date
Evans Barning Jr. F	Toronto, Ontario	Archbishop Carroll HS	6 ft 7 in (2.01 m)	200 lb (91 kg)	Aug 15, 2025
Evans Barning Jr. F	Recruit ratings: Rivals: 247Sports: ESPN: (NA)				
MJ Feenane g	Miami, FL	Christopher Columbus HS	6 ft 6 in (1.98 m)	190 lb (86 kg)	Jul 2, 2025
MJ Feenane g	Recruit ratings: Rivals: 247Sports: ESPN: (NA)				
Jayden Forsythe; F	Norristown, PA	Westtown School	6 ft 5 in (1.96 m)	190 lb (86 kg)	May 6, 2025
Jayden Forsythe; F	Recruit ratings: Rivals: 247Sports: ESPN: (79)				
Amir Jenkins; G	Worcester, MA	Worcester Academy	6 ft 2 in (1.88 m)	170 lb (77 kg)	Jul 1, 2025
Amir Jenkins; G	Recruit ratings: Rivals: 247Sports: ESPN: (NA)				
DJ Thomas; F	Allen, TX	Allen HS	6 ft 7 in (2.01 m)	210 lb (95 kg)	Apr 8, 2025
DJ Thomas; F	Recruit ratings: Rivals: 247Sports: ESPN: (NA)				
Overall recruit ranking: Rivals: 51 247Sports: 51 On3: 63 ESPN: NA
Note: In many cases, Scout, Rivals, 247Sports, On3, and ESPN may conflict in their listings of height and weight.; In these cases, the average was taken. ESPN grades are on a 100-point scale.; Sources: "2025 Team Ranking". Rivals.

== Preseason ==
The Big 12 preseason coaches poll was released on October 16, 2025. All awards were voted on by the league's 16 head coaches, who could not vote for their own team or players. The Big 12 preseason media poll was released on October 30, 2025.

Big 12 Preseason Coaches Poll

	Big 12 Coaches	Points
1.	Houston	224 (12)
2.	BYU	204 (1)
3.	Texas Tech	200
4.	Arizona	179 (1)
5.	Iowa State	170
6.	Kansas	163
7.	Baylor	137
8.	Cincinnati	120
9.	Kansas State	117
10.	TCU	90
11.	West Virginia	79
12.	Oklahoma State	77
13.	Utah	50
14.	UCF	39
15.	Colorado	37
16.	Arizona State	34
Reference: (#) first-place votes

Big 12 Preseason Media Poll

	Big 12 Media
1.	Houston
2.	Texas Tech
3.	BYU
4.	Arizona
5.	Iowa State
6.	Kansas
7.	Baylor
8.	Kansas State
9.	Cincinnati
10.	TCU
11.	West Virginia
12.	Oklahoma State
13.	Utah
14.	UCF
15.	Colorado
16.	Arizona State

== Roster ==
2025–26 West Virginia Mountaineers men's basketball team
Players
Coaches

Pos.	#	Name	Height	Weight	Year	Previous school	Hometown
F	0	Brenen Lorient	6 ft 9 in (2.06 m)	215 lb (98 kg)	Sr	North Texas	Ocala, FL
G	1	Jasper Floyd	6 ft 3 in (1.91 m)	195 lb (88 kg)	Sr	North Texas	Tampa, FL
G	2	Amir Jenkins	6 ft 2 in (1.88 m)	180 lb (82 kg)	Fr	Worcester Academy	Worcester, MA
G	3	Honor Huff	5 ft 10 in (1.78 m)	165 lb (75 kg)	Sr	Chattanooga	Brooklyn, NY
G	4	Jayden Forsythe	6 ft 5 in (1.96 m)	195 lb (88 kg)	Fr	Westtown School	Brooklyn, NY
F	5	DJ Thomas	6 ft 9 in (2.06 m)	225 lb (102 kg)	Fr	Allen HS	Allen, TX
F	7	Abraham Barning Jr.	6 ft 7 in (2.01 m)	200 lb (91 kg)	Fr	Archbishop Carroll HS	Toronto, Ontario, Canada
C	8	Abraham Oyeadier	6 ft 9 in (2.06 m)	225 lb (102 kg)	RS Fr	AOSS Prep	Ocala, FL
G	13	Chance Moore (5Y)	6 ft 6 in (1.98 m)	210 lb (95 kg)	Sr	St. Bonaventure	Brookhaven, GA
F	15	Jackson Fields	6 ft 8 in (2.03 m)	225 lb (102 kg)	Sr	Troy	Missouri City, TX
G	20	MJ Feenane	6 ft 6 in (1.98 m)	190 lb (86 kg)	Fr	Christopher Columbus HS	Miami, FL
G	21	Niyol Hauet	6 ft 4 in (1.93 m)	180 lb (82 kg)	RS Fr	Weber State	Yokohama, Japan
G	23	Morris Ugusuk	6 ft 4 in (1.93 m)	180 lb (82 kg)	Fr	South Carolina	Helsinki, Finland
G	52	Treysen Eaglestaff	6 ft 6 in (1.98 m)	205 lb (93 kg)	Sr	North Dakota	Bismarck, ND
C	55	Harlan Obioha	7 ft 0 in (2.13 m)	265 lb (120 kg)	Sr	UNC Wilmington	Hoxie, KS

Head coach

- Ross Hodge (East Texas A&M)

Assistant coach(es)

- Yusuf Ali (Seneca College)
- Johnny Estelle (Texas A&M–Kingsville)
- Phil Forte (Oklahoma State)
- Jase Herl (Colorado Mesa)
- Andre Shaw (Western New England)

Legend

- (C) Team captain
- (S) Suspended
- (I) Ineligible
- (W) Walk-on
- Injured
- Current redshirt

Roster

== Schedule and results ==
Date time, TV	Rank^{#}	Opponent^{#}	Result	Record	High points	High rebounds	High assists	Site (attendance) city, state
Exhibition
October 26, 2025*; 4:00 p.m., ESPN+		Wheeling	W 80–54	–	19 – Obioha	8 – Obioha	3 – Jenkins	Hope Coliseum (9,056); Morgantown, WV
Non-conference regular season
November 4, 2025*; 7:00 p.m., ESPN+		Mount St. Mary's	W 70–54	1–0	25 – Floyd	13 – Lorient	4 – Floyd	Hope Coliseum (10,081); Morgantown, WV
November 6, 2025*; 7:00 p.m., ESPN+		Campbell	W 73–65	2–0	23 – Huff	9 – Lorient	4 – Tied	Hope Coliseum (9,251); Morgantown, WV
November 9, 2025*; 3:00 p.m., ESPN+		Lehigh	W 69–47	3–0	26 – Lorient	8 – Obioha	4 – Floyd	Hope Coliseum (10,264); Morgantown, WV
November 13, 2025*; 6:00 p.m., FS1		Pittsburgh; Backyard Brawl	W 71–49	4–0	19 – Obioha	6 – Obioha	7 – Floyd	Hope Coliseum (12,453); Morgantown, WV
November 17, 2025*; 7:00 p.m., ESPN+		Lafayette	W 81–59	5–0	25 – Thomas	5 – Tied	6 – Floyd	Hope Coliseum (9,360); Morgantown, WV
November 21, 2025*; 6:30 p.m., ESPNU		vs. Clemson; Charleston Classic Palmetto Bracket Semifinal	L 67–70	5–1	17 – Huff	9 – Obioha	4 – Jenkins	TD Arena (4,856); Charleston, SC
November 23, 2025*; 3:30 p.m., ESPN		vs. Xavier; Charleston Classic Palmetto 3rd Place Game	L 68–78	5–2	20 – Eaglestaff	6 – Floyd	4 – Eaglestaff	TD Arena (3,823); Charleston, SC
November 30, 2025*; 3:00 p.m., ESPN+		Mercyhurst	W 70–38	6–2	11 – Moore	9 – Moore	3 – Jenkins	Hope Coliseum (10,319); Morgantown, WV
December 3, 2025*; 7:00 p.m., ESPN+		Coppin State	W 91–49	7–2	17 – Tied	8 – Eaglestaff	4 – Fields	Hope Coliseum (9,713); Morgantown, WV
December 6, 2025*; 6:00 p.m., ESPN2		vs. Wake Forest; Holiday Hoopfest	L 66–75	7–3	24 – Huff	8 – Moore	3 – Floyd	Charleston Coliseum (10,221); Charleston, WV
December 9, 2025*; 7:00 p.m., ESPN+		Little Rock	W 90–58	8–3	24 – Huff	7 – Tied	6 – Tied	Hope Coliseum (9,803); Morgantown, WV
December 13, 2025*; 8:00 p.m., ESPNU		vs. Ohio State; Cleveland Hoops Showdown	L 88–89 ^{2OT}	8–4	24 – Huff	7 – Lorient	5 – Huff	Rocket Arena (6,465); Cleveland, OH
December 22, 2025*; 7:00 p.m., ESPN+		Mississippi Valley State	W 86–51	9–4	23 – Eaglestaff	10 – Obioha	5 – Lorient	Hope Coliseum (10,234); Morgantown, WV
Big 12 regular season
January 2, 2026; 9:00 p.m., ESPN2		at No. 3 Iowa State	L 59–80	9–5 (0–1)	17 – Moore	7 – Moore	4 – Tied	Hilton Coliseum (14,266); Ames, IA
January 6, 2026; 7:00 p.m., ESPN2		Cincinnati; Rivalry	W 62–60	10–5 (1–1)	24 – Huff	8 – Huff	3 – Floyd	Hope Coliseum (9,903); Morgantown, WV
January 10, 2026; 12:00 p.m., FOX		No. 22 Kansas	W 86–75	11–5 (2–1)	23 – Huff	10 – Obioha	6 – Lorient	Hope Coliseum (13,743); Morgantown, WV
January 13, 2026; 8:30 p.m., FS1		at No. 7 Houston	L 48–77	11–6 (2–2)	16 – Thomas	6 – Jenkins	3 – Eaglestaff	Fertitta Center (7,035); Houston, TX
January 17, 2026; 6:00 p.m., CBSSN		Colorado	W 72–61	12–6 (3–2)	22 – Eaglestaff	9 – Tied	3 – Tied	Hope Coliseum (12,607); Morgantown, WV
January 21, 2026; 9:00 p.m., Peacock		at Arizona State	W 75–63	13–6 (4–2)	23 – Eaglestaff	7 – Eaglestaff	4 – Tied	Desert Financial Arena (7,153); Tempe, AZ
January 24, 2026; 2:00 p.m., CBS		at No. 1 Arizona	L 53–88	13–7 (4–3)	12 – Moore	8 – Jenkins	2 – Huff	McKale Center (14,688); Tucson, AZ
January 27, 2026; 8:30 p.m., FS1		Kansas State	W 59–54	14–7 (5–3)	17 – Huff	9 – Eaglestaff	5 – Tied	Hope Coliseum (10,809); Morgantown, WV
January 31, 2026; 4:00 p.m., ESPN2		Baylor	L 53–63	14–8 (5–4)	19 – Lorient	9 – Floyd	4 – Huff	Hope Coliseum (13,251); Morgantown, WV
February 5, 2026; 7:00 p.m., ESPN2		at Cincinnati; Rivalry	W 59–54	15–8 (6–4)	16 – Huff	6 – Obioha	6 – Huff	Fifth Third Arena (10,215); Cincinnati, OH
February 8, 2026; 2:00 p.m., FOX		No. 13 Texas Tech	L 63–70	15–9 (6–5)	21 – Lorient	7 – Obioha	3 – Tied	Hope Coliseum (12,009); Morgantown, WV
February 14, 2026; 6:00 p.m., FS1		at UCF	W 74–67	16–9 (7–5)	21 – Huff	8 – Lorient	2 – Eaglestaff	Addition Financial Arena (8,081); Orlando, FL
February 18, 2026; 8:30 p.m., FS1		Utah	L 56–61	16–10 (7–6)	12 – Tied	6 – Lorient	3 – Lorient	Hope Coliseum (10,527); Morgantown, WV
February 21, 2026; 5:00 p.m., Peacock		at TCU	L 54–60	16–11 (7–7)	13 – Huff	8 – Moore	5 – Floyd	Schollmaier Arena (5,556); Fort Worth, TX
February 24, 2026; 7:00 p.m., CBSSN		at Oklahoma State	L 84–91 ^{OT}	16–12 (7–8)	20 – Huff	10 – Moore	7 – Floyd	Gallagher-Iba Arena (5,018); Stillwater, OK
February 28, 2026; 5:30 p.m., FOX		No. 19 BYU	W 79–71	17–12 (8–8)	19 – Huff	9 – Lorient	6 – Huff	Hope Coliseum (13,799); Morgantown, WV
March 3, 2026; 7:00 p.m., ESPN+		at Kansas State	L 63–65	17–13 (8–9)	18 – Moore	11 – Eaglestaff	5 – Eaglestaff	Bramlage Coliseum (6,705); Manhattan, KS
March 6, 2026; 8:00 p.m., CBSSN		UCF	W 77–62	18–13 (9–9)	22 – Huff	7 – Eaglestaff	4 – Huff	Hope Coliseum (11,312); Morgantown, WV
Big 12 tournament
March 11, 2026; 7:00 p.m., ESPN2	(7)	vs. (10) BYU; Second round	L 48–68	18–14	17 – Huff	7 – Lorient	3 – Huff	T-Mobile Center (12,811); Kansas City, MO
College Basketball Crown
April 2, 2026*; 8:00 p.m., FS1		vs. Stanford; Quarterfinal	W 82–77 ^{OT}	19–14	21 – Huff	7 – Tied	3 – Huff	MGM Grand Garden Arena (2,310); Paradise, NV
April 4, 2026*; 4:00 p.m., FOX		vs. Creighton; Semifinal	W 87–70	20–14	20 – Thomas	13 – Moore	4 – Tied	T-Mobile Arena (2,947); Paradise, NV
April 5, 2026*; 5:30 p.m., FOX		vs. Oklahoma; Championship	W 89–82 ^{OT}	21–14	38 – Huff	10 – Moore	6 – Floyd	T-Mobile Arena (3,109); Paradise, NV
*Non-conference game. ^{#}Rankings from AP Poll. (#) Tournament seedings in parentheses. All times are in Eastern Time.

== See also ==
- 2025–26 West Virginia Mountaineers women's basketball team
