= 2025–26 Stanford Cardinal men's basketball team =

American college basketball season

2025–26 Stanford Cardinal men's basketball

Acrisure Invitational champions

College Basketball Crown, Quarterfinal
- Conference: Atlantic Coast Conference
- Record: 20–13 (9–9 ACC)
- Head coach: Kyle Smith (2nd season)
- Associate head coach: Eric Reveno
- Assistant coaches: Jim Shaw; Wayne Hunter; Jeremy Harden; Brett MacConnell
- Home arena: Maples Pavilion

2025–26 ACC men's basketball standings
	Conf.				Overall
Team	W		L	PCT	W		L	PCT
No. 4 Duke †	17	–	1	.944	35	–	3	.921
No. 17 Virginia	15	–	3	.833	30	–	6	.833
No. 24 Miami (FL)	13	–	5	.722	26	–	9	.743
North Carolina	12	–	6	.667	24	–	9	.727
Clemson	12	–	6	.667	24	–	11	.686
No. 23 Louisville	11	–	7	.611	24	–	11	.686
NC State	10	–	8	.556	20	–	14	.588
Florida State	10	–	8	.556	18	–	15	.545
California	9	–	9	.500	22	–	12	.647
Stanford	9	–	9	.500	20	–	13	.606
SMU	8	–	10	.444	20	–	14	.588
Virginia Tech	8	–	10	.444	19	–	13	.594
Wake Forest	7	–	11	.389	18	–	17	.514
Syracuse	6	–	12	.333	15	–	17	.469
Pittsburgh	5	–	13	.278	13	–	20	.394
Notre Dame	4	–	14	.222	13	–	18	.419
Boston College	4	–	14	.222	11	–	20	.355
Georgia Tech	2	–	16	.111	11	–	20	.355
† 2026 ACC tournament winner Rankings from AP Poll

The 2025–26 Stanford Cardinal men's basketball team represented Stanford University during the 2025–26 NCAA Division I men's basketball season. The Cardinals, led by second-year head coach Kyle Smith, played their home games at Maples Pavilion in their second season as members of the Atlantic Coast Conference.

The Cardinal won their first four straight games, including a victory over Louisiana in their opening Acrisure Series game. Their first loss of the season came by eight-points against Seattle. They traveled to Thousand Palms, California to participate in the remainder of the Acrisure Series. The Cardinal won their semifinal game against Minnesota by four-points and then won the Championship game against Saint Louis by a point to finish as champions. They lost by a point to UNLV, but otherwise won the remainder of their non-conference games. This included a neutral-site win over Colorado in the Hall of Fame Series. The Cardinal opened ACC play with a low-scoring 40–47 loss against Notre Dame. They rebounded by going 3–1 over their next four games. The run saw the Cardinal face three ranked teams. They defeated fourteenth-ranked North Carolina and sixteenth-ranked Louisville but lost to twenty-third ranked Virginia. The Cardinal went on a five-game losing streak after the run. They lost to sixth-ranked Duke, twentieth-ranked Clemson and rivals California over the stretch. The team broke the streak on February 7 with a win over Georgia Tech. After defeating Boston College, they lost to Wake Forest and their rivalry re-match with California. They finished the regular season on a high, winning their final four games. The final two games were road victories over Notre Dame and NC State.

The Cardinal finished 20–13 and 9–9 in ACC play to finish in a tie for ninth place. As the tenth seed in the 2026 ACC tournament, they were defeated by Pittsburgh 63–64 in the First Round. They received an at-large bid to the College Basketball Crown. They lost to eventual tournament champions West Virginia 77–82 in the Quarterfinals to end their season.

== Previous season ==
The Cardinal finished 21–14 and 11–9 in ACC play to finish in seventh place. As the seventh seed in the 2025 ACC tournament, they defeated rival Cal in the second round 78–73 before narrowly falling to Louisville 75–73 on a last second Chucky Hepburn buzzer-beater. They received an at-large bid to the National Invitation Tournament as the No. 2 seed in the San Francisco Region. They defeated Cal State Northridge in the First Round 87–80 before narrowly losing to Kent State 77–75 in the Second Round.

== Offseason ==
=== Departures ===
Stanford Departures
Name	Number	Pos.	Height	Weight	Year	Hometown	Reason for Departure
Derin Saran	1	G	6'4"	190	Junior	Istanbul, Turkey	Transferred to UC Irvine
Oziyah Sellers	4	G	6'5"	185	Sophomore	Hayward, CA	Transferred to St. John's
Cole Kastner	9	F	6'7"	215	Graduate Student	Palo Alto, CA	Graduated
Jaylen Blakes	21	G	6'2"	195	Graduate Student	Somerset, NJ	Graduated
Maxime Raynaud	42	C	7'1"	250	Senior	Paris, France	Graduated/2025 NBA Draft; Selected 42nd overall by the Sacramento Kings

=== Incoming transfers ===
Stanford Additions
Name	Number	Pos.	Height	Weight	Year	Hometown	Notes
AJ Rohosy	4	G	6'9"	230	Graduate Student	San Anselmo, CA	Transfer from Claremont-Mudd-Scripps
Jeremy Dent-Smith	25	G	6'1"	200	Graduate Student	Hawthorne, CA	Transfer from Cal State Dominguez Hills

=== 2025 recruiting class ===
College recruiting information
Name	Hometown	School	Height	Weight	Commit date
Ebuka Okorie; PG	Nashua, NH	Brewster Academy	6 ft 2 in (1.88 m)	185 lb (84 kg)	Nov 24, 2024
Ebuka Okorie; PG	Recruit ratings: 247Sports: On3: ESPN: (78)				
Kristers Skrinda; PF	Riga, Latvia	Rīgas Zeļļi	6 ft 10 in (2.08 m)	230 lb (100 kg)	Nov 18, 2024
Kristers Skrinda; PF	Recruit ratings: 247Sports: On3: (NR)				
Myles Jones; SG	Modesto, CA	Modesto Christian School	6 ft 3 in (1.91 m)	175 lb (79 kg)	Sep 15, 2024
Myles Jones; SG	Recruit ratings: 247Sports: On3: (NR)				
Oskar Giltay; C	Bilzen, Belgium	Limburg United	6 ft 10 in (2.08 m)	235 lb (107 kg)	May 30, 2025
Oskar Giltay; C	Recruit ratings: 247Sports: (NR)				
Overall recruit ranking: Rivals: 75 247Sports: 60
Note: In many cases, Scout, Rivals, 247Sports, On3, and ESPN may conflict in their listings of height and weight.; In these cases, the average was taken. ESPN grades are on a 100-point scale.; Sources: "Stanford 2025 Basketball Commitments". Rivals.; "2025 Stanford Cardinal Recruiting Class". ESPN.; "2025 Team Ranking". Rivals.

== Roster ==
2025–26 Stanford Cardinal men's basketball team
Players
Coaches

Pos.	#	Name	Height	Weight	Year	Previous school	Hometown
G	0	Anthony Batson Jr.	6 ft 3 in (1.91 m)	195 lb (88 kg)	So	Notre Dame Prep	Scottsdale, AZ
G	1	Ebuka Okorie	6 ft 2 in (1.88 m)	185 lb (84 kg)	Fr	Brewster Academy	Nashua, NH
F	2	Donavin Young	6 ft 8 in (2.03 m)	220 lb (100 kg)	So	Link Academy	Pasco, WA
F/C	3	Tallis Toure	6 ft 11 in (2.11 m)	240 lb (109 kg)	So	West Park	Roseville, CA
F	4	AJ Rohosy	6 ft 9 in (2.06 m)	230 lb (104 kg)	GS	Claremont-Mudd-Scripps	San Anselmo, CA
G	5	Benny Gealer	6 ft 1 in (1.85 m)	185 lb (84 kg)	Sr	Rolling Hills Prep	Palos Verdes Estates, CA
G	6	Myles Jones	6 ft 3 in (1.91 m)	175 lb (79 kg)	Fr	Modesto Christian	Sacramento, CA
F	10	Chisom Okpara	6 ft 8 in (2.03 m)	240 lb (109 kg)	Sr	Harvard	Bronxville, NY
G	11	Ryan Agarwal	6 ft 6 in (1.98 m)	205 lb (93 kg)	RS Jr	Coppell	Coppell, TX
F	12	Kristers Skrinda	6 ft 10 in (2.08 m)	230 lb (104 kg)	Fr	Riga State Gymnasium No. 2	Riga, Latvia
G	13	Ethan Kitch (W)	6 ft 2 in (1.88 m)	185 lb (84 kg)	So	Gunn	Palo Alto, CA
F/C	15	Oskar Giltay	6 ft 10 in (2.08 m)	235 lb (107 kg)	Fr	Topsportschool Antwerp	Bilzen, Belgium
F	20	Cameron Grant (W)	6 ft 7 in (2.01 m)	220 lb (100 kg)	RS So	St. Edward	Lakewood, OH
F	24	Jaylen Thompson	6 ft 7 in (2.01 m)	210 lb (95 kg)	RS So	Southern California Academy	Oakland, CA
G	25	Jeremy Dent-Smith	6 ft 1 in (1.85 m)	200 lb (91 kg)	GS	Cal State Dominguez Hills	Hawthorne, CA
F	33	Evan Stinson	6 ft 7 in (2.01 m)	205 lb (93 kg)	So	Cheney	Cheney, WA
F/C	52	Aidan Cammann	6 ft 10 in (2.08 m)	230 lb (104 kg)	RS So	Brewster Academy	Andover, MA

Head coach

- Kyle Smith (Hamilton)

Assistant coach(es)

- Eric Reveno (Stanford)
- Jim Shaw (Western Oregon)
- Wayne Hunter (Saint Mary's)
- Jeremy Harden (Arizona)
- Brett Macconnell (Rutgers)

Legend

- (C) Team captain
- (S) Suspended
- (I) Ineligible
- (W) Walk-on
- Injured
- Current redshirt

Roster

== Schedule and results ==
Date time, TV	Rank^{#}	Opponent^{#}	Result	Record	High points	High rebounds	High assists	Site (attendance) city, state
Exhibition
October 30, 2025*; 5:00 p.m., ACCNX/ESPN+		Oregon	W 78–70	–	20 – Okpara	6 – Tied	3 – Gealer	Maples Pavilion (2,349); Stanford, CA
Non-conference regular season
November 4, 2025*; 7:00 p.m., ACCNX/ESPN+		Portland State	W 89–79	1–0	26 – Okorie	7 – Tied	2 – Tied	Maples Pavilion (2,300); Stanford, CA
November 8, 2025*; 1:00 p.m., ACCNX/ESPN+		Montana	W 91–68	2–0	29 – Okorie	8 – Rohosy	4 – Dent-Smith	Maples Pavilion (3,549); Stanford, CA
November 12, 2025*; 7:00 p.m., ACCNX/ESPN+		Montana State	W 77–68	3–0	21 – Okorie	7 – Rohosy	3 – Tied	Maples Pavilion (2,334); Stanford, CA
November 18, 2025*; 7:00 p.m., ACCNX/ESPN+		Louisiana; Acrisure Series campus-site game	W 93–66	4–0	26 – Okorie	7 – Agarwal	5 – Okorie	Maples Pavilion (2,266); Stanford, CA
November 21, 2025*; 7:00 p.m., ACCNX/ESPN+		Seattle	L 69–77	4–1	17 – Okorie	5 – Tied	3 – Okpara	Maples Pavilion (2,884); Stanford, CA
November 27, 2025*; 6:30 p.m., CBSSN		vs. Minnesota; Acrisure Invitational semifinal	W 72–68	5–1	25 – Okorie	7 – Cammann	5 – Gealer	Acrisure Arena; Thousand Palms, CA
November 28, 2025*; 4:00 p.m., TruTV		vs. Saint Louis; Acrisure Invitational championship	W 78–77	6–1	19 – Okpara	9 – Rohosy	6 – Okorie	Acrisure Arena; Thousand Palms, CA
December 1, 2025*; 7:00 p.m., ACCNX/ESPN+		Portland	W 94–72	7–1	16 – Dent-Smith	8 – Giltay	3 – Tied	Maples Pavilion (2,284); Stanford, CA
December 7, 2025*; 1:00 p.m., ACCNX/ESPN+		UNLV	L 74–75	7–2	18 – Okorie	14 – Giltay	4 – Okpara	Maples Pavilion (3,981); Stanford, CA
December 13, 2025*; 4:30 p.m., CBSSN		at San Jose State	W 86–82	8–2	20 – Tied	9 – Agarwal	5 – Okpara	Provident Credit Union Event Center (2,745); San Jose, CA
December 17, 2025*; 7:00 p.m., ACCNX/ESPN+		UT Arlington	W 76–60	9–2	17 – Tied	7 – Rohosy	5 – Dent-Smith	Maples Pavilion (2,424); Stanford, CA
December 20, 2025*; 5:00 p.m., ESPNU		vs. Colorado; Hall of Fame Series - Phoenix	W 77–68	10–2	32 – Okorie	5 – Tied	3 – Dent-Smith	Mortgage Matchup Center (10,567); Phoenix, AZ
December 27, 2025*; 5:00 p.m., ACCNX/ESPN+		Cal State Northridge	W 88–80	11–2	30 – Okorie	8 – Tied	5 – Gealer	Maples Pavilion (3,033); Stanford, CA
ACC Regular Season
December 30, 2025; 6:00 p.m., ESPN2		Notre Dame	L 40–47	11–3 (0–1)	13 – Okpara	11 – Giltay	2 – Okorie	Maples Pavilion (3,868); Stanford, CA
January 2, 2026; 5:00 p.m., ACCN		No. 16 Louisville	W 80–76	12–3 (1–1)	28 – Okorie	8 – Okpara	3 – Okorie	Maples Pavilion (4,172); Stanford, CA
January 7, 2026; 4:00 p.m., ACCN		at Virginia Tech	W 69–68	13–3 (2–1)	31 – Okorie	13 – Giltay	6 – Okorie	Cassell Coliseum (5,427); Blacksburg, VA
January 10, 2026; 11:15 a.m., The CW		at No. 23 Virginia	L 55–70	13–4 (2–2)	15 – Gealer	6 – Tied	4 – Okpara	John Paul Jones Arena (14,637); Charlottesville, VA
January 14, 2026; 6:00 p.m., ACCN		No. 14 North Carolina	W 95–90	14–4 (3–2)	36 – Okorie	6 – Tied	9 – Okorie	Maples Pavilion (5,369); Stanford, CA
January 17, 2026; 3:00 p.m., ACCN		No. 6 Duke	L 50–80	14–5 (3–3)	18 – Dent-Smith	11 – Rohosy	3 – Gealer	Maples Pavilion (7,880); Stanford, CA
January 24, 2026; 5:00 p.m., ACCN		California; Rivalry	L 66–78	14–6 (3–4)	20 – Dent-Smith	9 – Tied	3 – Okorie	Maples Pavilion (7,291); Stanford, CA
January 28, 2026; 6:00 p.m., ACCN		at Miami	L 70–79	14–7 (3–5)	19 – Okorie	6 – Tied	4 – Okorie	Watsco Center (4,987); Coral Gables, FL
January 31, 2026; 3:00 p.m., ACCN		at Florida State	L 80–88	14–8 (3–6)	26 – Okorie	9 – Giltay	4 – Okorie	Donald L. Tucker Center (6,307); Tallahassee, FL
February 4, 2026; 7:00 p.m., ACCN		No. 20 Clemson	L 64–66	14–9 (3–7)	19 – Cammann	11 – Giltay	3 – Tied	Maples Pavilion (3,466); Stanford, CA
February 7, 2026; 5:00 p.m., ESPNU		Georgia Tech	W 95–72	15–9 (4–7)	40 – Okorie	9 – Agarwal	4 – Okorie	Maples Pavilion (4,812); Stanford, CA
February 11, 2026; 6:00 p.m., ESPNU		at Boston College	W 70–64	16–9 (5–7)	22 – Okorie	8 – Tied	5 – Okorie	Conte Forum (2,403); Chestnut Hill, MA
February 14, 2026; 1:00 p.m., ACCN		at Wake Forest	L 63–68	16–10 (5–8)	26 – Okorie	11 – Cammann	2 – Tied	LJVM Coliseum (7,219); Winston-Salem, NC
February 21, 2026; 3:00 p.m., ACCN		at California; Rivalry	L 66–72	16–11 (5–9)	19 – Cammann	13 – Okorie	3 – Tied	Haas Pavilion (9,020); Berkeley, CA
February 25, 2026; 5:00 p.m., ACCN		Pittsburgh	W 75–67	17–11 (6–9)	34 – Okorie	8 – Rohosy	6 – Okorie	Maples Pavilion (3,771); Stanford, CA
February 28, 2026; 3:00 p.m., ACCN		SMU	W 95–75	18–11 (7–9)	30 – Gealer	7 – Rohosy	6 – Okorie	Maples Pavilion (4,493); Stanford, CA
March 4, 2026; 6:00 p.m., ESPNU		at Notre Dame	W 86–78	19–11 (8–9)	24 – Okorie	5 – Rohosy	7 – Okorie	Joyce Center (3,902); South Bend, IN
March 7, 2026; 11:15 a.m., The CW		at NC State	W 85–84	20–11 (9–9)	33 – Okorie	7 – Rohosy	3 – Okorie	Lenovo Center (18,922); Raleigh, NC
ACC tournament
March 10, 2026*; 11:00 a.m., ACCN	(10)	vs. (15) Pittsburgh; First round	L 63–64	20–12	14 – Okorie	7 – Rohosy	2 – Tied	Spectrum Center (6,593); Charlotte, NC
College Basketball Crown
April 2, 2026*; 5:00 p.m., FS1		vs. West Virginia; Quarterfinal	L 77–82 ^{OT}	20–13	34 – Okorie	9 – Rohosy	5 – Okorie	MGM Grand Garden Arena; Paradise, NV
*Non-conference game. ^{#}Rankings from AP Poll. (#) Tournament seedings in parentheses. All times are in Pacific Time.
