= 2025–26 Colorado Buffaloes men's basketball team =

Colorado Basketball team

2025–26 Colorado Buffaloes men's basketball

Acrisure Holiday Classic champions

College Basketball Crown, Quarterfinal
- Conference: Big 12 Conference
- Record: 17–16 (7–11 Big 12)
- Head coach: Tad Boyle (16th season)
- Assistant coaches: Mike Rhon; Bill Grier; Danny Manning; Nate Tomlinson; Evan Battey
- Home arena: CU Events Center

2025–26 Big 12 men's basketball standings
	Conf.				Overall
Team	W		L	PCT	W		L	PCT
No. 3 Arizona †	16	–	2	.889	36	–	3	.923
No. 7 Houston	14	–	4	.778	30	–	7	.811
No. 20 Kansas	12	–	6	.667	24	–	11	.686
No. 21 Texas Tech	12	–	6	.667	23	–	11	.676
No. 8 Iowa State	12	–	6	.667	29	–	8	.784
TCU	11	–	7	.611	23	–	12	.657
West Virginia	9	–	9	.500	21	–	14	.600
UCF	9	–	9	.500	21	–	12	.636
Cincinnati	9	–	9	.500	18	–	15	.545
BYU	9	–	9	.500	23	–	12	.657
Colorado	7	–	11	.389	17	–	16	.515
Arizona State	7	–	11	.389	17	–	16	.515
Baylor	6	–	12	.333	17	–	17	.500
Oklahoma State	6	–	12	.333	20	–	15	.571
Kansas State	3	–	15	.167	12	–	20	.375
Utah	2	–	16	.111	10	–	22	.313
† 2026 Big 12 tournament winner Rankings from AP poll

The 2025–26 Colorado Buffaloes men's basketball team represented the University of Colorado Boulder in the 2025–26 NCAA Division I men's basketball season. They were led by Tad Boyle in his 16th season as head coach. The Buffaloes play their home games at CU Events Center in Boulder, Colorado as members of the Big 12 Conference.

== Off-season ==
=== Departures ===
Name	Pos.	Height	Weight	Year	Hometown	Reason for departure
Julian Hammond III	G	6'2"	195	Senior	Denver, CO	Graduated; Signed with KK Vršac.
Assane Diop	C	6'8"	210	Sophomore	Dakar, Senegal	Transferred to San Diego.
RJ Smith	G	6'3"	190	RS Sophomore	Chino, CA	Transferred to DePaul.
Javon Ruffin	G	6'5"	185	RS Junior	New Orleans, LA	Transferred to Bowling Green.
Harrison Carrington	G/F	6'7"	207	RS Sophomore	Menlo Park, CA	Transferred to UC Irvine.
Courtney Anderson Jr.	G	6'5"	192	RS Freshman	Vallejo, CA	Transferred to Montana.
Greg Gerhardt	F/C	6'10"	215	RS Sophomore	Superior, CO	Transferred to UCCS.
Trevor Baskin	F	6'9"	200	Graduate student	Superior, CO	Graduated.

=== 2025 Recruiting class ===
College recruiting information
Name	Hometown	School	Height	Weight	Commit date
Josiah Sanders; G	Denver, CO	Colorado Academy	6 ft 4 in (1.93 m)	200 lb (91 kg)	Oct 7, 2024
Josiah Sanders; G	Recruit ratings: Rivals: 247Sports: ESPN:				
Jalin Holland; G	Los Lunas, NM	Dream City Christian School	6 ft 4 in (1.93 m)	185 lb (84 kg)	Sep 27, 2024
Jalin Holland; G	Recruit ratings: Rivals: 247Sports: ESPN:				
Fawaz "Tacko" Ifaola; C	Glendale, AZ	Dream City Christian School	6 ft 11 in (2.11 m)	235 lb (107 kg)	Oct 25, 2024
Fawaz "Tacko" Ifaola; C	Recruit ratings: Rivals: 247Sports:				
Isaiah Johnson; G	Valley Village, CA	Campbell Hall School	6 ft 1 in (1.85 m)	170 lb (77 kg)	Sep 18, 2024
Isaiah Johnson; G	Recruit ratings: Rivals: 247Sports:				
Ian Inman; G	The Woodlands, TX	The Woodlands College Park High School	6 ft 5 in (1.96 m)	180 lb (82 kg)	Sep 18, 2024
Ian Inman; G	Recruit ratings: Rivals: 247Sports:				
Overall recruit ranking:
Note: In many cases, Scout, Rivals, 247Sports, On3, and ESPN may conflict in their listings of height and weight.; In these cases, the average was taken. ESPN grades are on a 100-point scale.; Sources: "2025 Colorado Commits". Rivals.; "2025 Team Ranking". Rivals.

== Roster ==
2025–26 Colorado Buffaloes men's basketball team
Players
Coaches

Pos.	#	Name	Height	Weight	Year	Previous school	Hometown
G/F	0	Ian Inman	6 ft 6 in (1.98 m)	200 lb (91 kg)	Fr	College Park HS	Houston, TX
G	1	Jon Mani	6 ft 7 in (2.01 m)	190 lb (86 kg)	So	Beverly Hills HS/Denver	Los Angeles, CA
G	2	Isaiah Johnson	6 ft 1 in (1.85 m)	170 lb (77 kg)	Fr	Campbell Hall School	Los Angeles, CA
F	3	Alon Michaeli	6 ft 9 in (2.06 m)	229 lb (104 kg)	Fr	Bnei Hertzeliyya	Kfar Saba, Israel
G	5	Josiah Sanders	6 ft 5 in (1.96 m)	210 lb (95 kg)	Fr	Colorado Prep	Denver, CO
F	7	Sebastian Rancik	6 ft 11 in (2.11 m)	220 lb (100 kg)	So	JSerra Catholic HS	Bratislava, Slovakia
F	8	Bangot Dak	7 ft 0 in (2.13 m)	203 lb (92 kg)	Jr	Lincoln Southeast HS	Lincoln, NE
G	11	Jalin Holland	6 ft 5 in (1.96 m)	200 lb (91 kg)	Fr	Dream City Christian (Ariz.)	Los Lunas, NM
G	15	Felix Kossaras	6 ft 6 in (1.98 m)	192 lb (87 kg)	So	Fort Erie International Academy	Montreal, QC, Canada
G	24	Barrington Hargress	6 ft 1 in (1.85 m)	190 lb (86 kg)	Jr	Heritage Christian School (Calif.)	Inglewood, CA
C	25	Fawaz Ifaola	7 ft 0 in (2.13 m)	245 lb (111 kg)	Fr	Dream City Christian (Ariz.)	Lagos, Nigeria
C	33	Leonardo Van Elswyk	7 ft 1 in (2.16 m)	245 lb (111 kg)	Fr	Olimpia Milano	Milan, Italy
F	41	Nick Randall	6 ft 8 in (2.03 m)	195 lb (88 kg)	RS So	Fossil Ridge HS (Colo.)	Fort Collins, CO
G	42	Andrew Crawford	6 ft 8 in (2.03 m)	190 lb (86 kg)	RS Fr	ThunderRidge HS	Littleton, CO
C	50	Elijah Malone	6 ft 10 in (2.08 m)	270 lb (122 kg)	GS	Prairie Heights Senior HS/Grace College (Ind.)	LaGrange, IN

Head coach

- Tad Boyle (Kansas)

Assistant coach(es)

- Mike Rohn (McPherson)
- Bill Grier (Oregon)
- Danny Manning (Kansas)
- Nate Tomlinson (Colorado)
- Evan Battey (Colorado)

Legend

- (C) Team captain
- (S) Suspended
- (I) Ineligible
- (W) Walk-on
- Injured
- Current redshirt

Roster

== Schedule and results ==
Date time, TV	Rank^{#}	Opponent^{#}	Result	Record	High points	High rebounds	High assists	Site (attendance) city, state
Exhibition
October 19, 2025*; 12:00 p.m.		Grace College	W 92−66		21 – Johnson	9 – Malone	5 – Sanders	CU Events Center (702); Boulder, CO
Non-conference regular season
November 3, 2025*; 7:00 p.m., ESPN+		Montana State	W 84–78	1–0	24 – Johnson	13 – Malone	5 – Malone	CU Events Center (5,771); Boulder, CO
November 8, 2025*; 2:00 p.m., ESPN+		Eastern Washington	W 102–97 ^{OT}	2–0	24 – Ranch	9 – Dak	4 – Rancik	CU Events Center (5,289); Boulder, CO
November 14, 2025*; 7:00 p.m., ESPN+		Providence	W 97–88	3–0	17 – Malone	7 – Malone	11 – Hargress	CU Events Center (6,596); Boulder, CO
November 17, 2025*; 7:00 p.m., ESPN+		Alabama State	W 94–66	4–0	16 – Dak	7 – Dak	4 – Michaeli	CU Events Center (5,047); Boulder, CO
November 21, 2025*; 7:00 p.m., ESPN+		UC Davis; Acrisure Series campus game	W 95–79	5–0	18 – Dak	7 – Rancik	5 – Rancik	CU Events Center (5,209); Boulder, CO
November 27, 2025*; 12:00 p.m., CBSSN		vs. San Francisco; Acrisure Holiday Classic semifinal	W 79–69	6–0	17 – Johnson	9 – Rancik	6 – Dak	Acrisure Arena; Thousand Palm, CA
November 28, 2025*; 2:30 p.m., TruTV		vs. Washington; Acrisure Holiday Classic championship	W 81–68	7–0	15 – Dak	11 – Dak	8 – Hargress	Acrisure Arena; Thousand Palms, CA
December 1, 2025*; 7:00 p.m., ESPN+		California Baptist	W 78–70	8–0	17 – Johnson	7 – Dak	3 – Dak	CU Events Center (4,931); Boulder, CO
December 6, 2025*; 3:00 p.m., CBSSN		at Colorado State; Rocky Mountain Showdown	L 86–91	8–1	19 – Michaeli	7 – Rancik	3 – Tied	Moby Arena (8,083); Fort Collins, CO
December 13, 2025*; 2:00 p.m., ESPN+		UTSA	W 88–64	9–1	20 – Simpson	6 – Simpson	5 – Simpson	CU Events Center (5,229); Boulder, CO
December 17, 2025*; 7:00 p.m., ESPN+		Portland State	W 84–73	10–1	20 – Johnson	10 – Tied	6 – Hargress	CU Events Center (101); Boulder, CO
December 20, 2025*; 6:00 p.m., ESPNU		vs. Stanford; Hall of Fame Series - Phoenix	L 68–77	10–2	16 – Hargress	8 – Rancik	6 – Hargress	Mortgage Matchup Center (10,567); Phoenix, AZ
December 28, 2025*; 1:00 p.m., ESPN+		Northern Colorado	L 81–86	10–3	25 – Johnson	8 – Johnson	5 – Hargress	CU Events Center (8,347); Boulder, CO
Big 12 regular season
January 3, 2026; 12:00 p.m., TNT/TruTV		at Arizona State	W 95–89	11–3 (1–0)	19 – Johnson	10 – Dak	5 – Sanders	Desert Financial Arena (7,377); Tempe, AZ
January 7, 2026; 7:00 p.m., ESPN+		Utah; Rivalry	W 85–73	12–3 (2–0)	19 – Rancik	13 – Dak	3 – Hargress	CU Events Center (6,768); Boulder, CO
January 10, 2026; 5:00 p.m., CBSSN		No. 14 Texas Tech	L 71–73	12–4 (2–1)	21 – Johnson	13 – Dak	4 – Hargress	CU Events Center (8,232); Boulder, CO
January 14, 2026; 5:00 p.m., Peacock		at Cincinnati	L 68–77	12–5 (2–2)	18 – Johnson	7 – Dak	3 – Tied	Fifth Third Arena (9,331); Cincinnati, OH
January 17, 2026; 4:00 p.m., CBSSN		at West Virginia	L 61–72	12–6 (2–3)	15 – Hargress	7 – Michaeli	5 – Hargress	WVU Coliseum (12,607); Morgantown, WV
January 20, 2026; 9:00 p.m., ESPN		No. 19 Kansas	L 69–75	12–7 (2–4)	19 – Johnson	7 – Dak	4 – Hargress	CU Events Center (8,356); Boulder, CO
January 24, 2026; 1:00 p.m., ESPN+		UCF	L 86–95	12–8 (2–5)	20 – Tied	9 – Dak	6 – Johnson	CU Events Center (6,528); Boulder, CO
January 29, 2026; 5:00 p.m., FS1		at No. 8 Iowa State	L 67–97	12–9 (2–6)	24 – Johnson	5 – Sanders	3 – Hargress	Hilton Coliseum (14,267); Ames, IA
February 1, 2026; 12:00 p.m., TNT/TruTV		TCU	W 87–61	13–9 (3–6)	17 – Rancik	6 – Rancik	6 – Sanders	CU Events Center (6,719); Boulder, CO
February 4, 2026; 6:00 p.m., Peacock		at Baylor	L 67–86	13–10 (3–7)	12 – Holland	6 – Dak	4 – Johnson	Foster Pavilion (7,012); Waco, TX
February 7, 2026; 12:00 p.m., TNT/TruTV		Arizona State	W 78–70	14–10 (4–7)	23 – Hargress	6 – Sanders	4 – Hargress	CU Events Center (6,820); Boulder, CO
February 11, 2026; 6:00 p.m., ESPN+		at No. 16 Texas Tech	L 44–77	14–11 (4–8)	13 – Johnson	6 – Ifoaola	3 – Hargress	United Supermarkets Arena (13,246); Lubbock, TX
February 14, 2026; 2:00 p.m., FS1		at No. 22 BYU	L 86–90 ^{OT}	14–12 (4–9)	27 – Johnson	10 – Rancik	6 – Rancik	Marriott Center (18,163); Provo, UT
February 21, 2026; 1:30 p.m., TNT/TruTV		Oklahoma State	W 83–69	15–12 (5–9)	17 – Dak	10 – Rancik	8 – Hargress	CU Events Center (6,771); Boulder, CO
February 25, 2026; 7:00 p.m., FS1		Kansas State	W 79–70	16–12 (6–9)	18 – Johnson	9 – Johnson	7 – Johnson	CU Events Center (6,058); Boulder, CO
February 28, 2026; 10:00 a.m., ESPN2		at No. 5 Houston	L 62–102	16–13 (6–10)	19 – Johnson	5 – Hargress	6 – Hargress	Fertitta Center (7,035); Houston, TX
March 3, 2026; 7:00 p.m., ESPN+		at Utah; Rivalry	W 92–78	17–13 (7–10)	22 – Dak	9 – Dak	5 – Sanders	Jon M. Huntsman Center (6,975); Salt Lake City, UT
March 7, 2026; 9:00 p.m., ESPN2		No. 2 Arizona	L 79–89	17–14 (7–11)	28 – Johnson	8 – Malone	5 – Johnson	CU Events Center (8,953); Boulder, CO
Big 12 Tournament
March 10, 2026; 7:30 p.m., ESPN+	(11)	vs. (14) Oklahoma State; First round	L 83–92	17–15	22 – Dak	8 – Dak	9 – Hargress	T-Mobile Center (12,542); Kansas City, MO
College Basketball Crown
April 1, 2026*; 6:00 p.m., FS1		vs. Oklahoma; Quarterfinal	L 86–90 ^{OT}	17–16	31 – Hargress	9 – Sanders	3 – Tied	MGM Grand Garden Arena; Paradise, NV
*Non-conference game. ^{#}Rankings from AP Poll. (#) Tournament seedings in parentheses. All times are in Mountain Time.
