= 2025–26 Oklahoma State Cowboys basketball team =

American college basketball season

2025–26 Oklahoma State Cowboys basketball

NIT, Second round
- Conference: Big 12 Conference
- Record: 20–15 (6–12 Big 12)
- Head coach: Steve Lutz (2nd season)
- Associate head coach: James Miller
- Assistant coaches: Lou Gudino; Robert Guster; Keiton Page; Dana Valentine
- Home arena: Gallagher-Iba Arena

2025–26 Big 12 men's basketball standings
	Conf.				Overall
Team	W		L	PCT	W		L	PCT
No. 3 Arizona †	16	–	2	.889	36	–	3	.923
No. 7 Houston	14	–	4	.778	30	–	7	.811
No. 20 Kansas	12	–	6	.667	24	–	11	.686
No. 21 Texas Tech	12	–	6	.667	23	–	11	.676
No. 8 Iowa State	12	–	6	.667	29	–	8	.784
TCU	11	–	7	.611	23	–	12	.657
West Virginia	9	–	9	.500	21	–	14	.600
UCF	9	–	9	.500	21	–	12	.636
Cincinnati	9	–	9	.500	18	–	15	.545
BYU	9	–	9	.500	23	–	12	.657
Colorado	7	–	11	.389	17	–	16	.515
Arizona State	7	–	11	.389	17	–	16	.515
Baylor	6	–	12	.333	17	–	17	.500
Oklahoma State	6	–	12	.333	20	–	15	.571
Kansas State	3	–	15	.167	12	–	20	.375
Utah	2	–	16	.111	10	–	22	.313
† 2026 Big 12 tournament winner Rankings from AP poll

The 2025–26 Oklahoma State Cowboys basketball team represented Oklahoma State University during the 2025–26 NCAA Division I men's basketball season. The team, led by second-year head coach Steve Lutz, played their home games at Gallagher-Iba Arena located in Stillwater, Oklahoma as a member of the Big 12 Conference.

== Previous season ==
The Cowboys finished the 2024–25 season 17–18, 7–13 in Big 12 play, tied for 12th place and received the no. 12 seed in the Big 12 tournament. They were defeated by Cincinnati in the first round. The Cowboys received a bid to the 2025 NIT tournament, where they were the no. 4 seed in the Dallas Region. They defeated Wichita State in the first round, 89–79. In their second-round matchup, the Cowboys defeated regional no. 1 seed SMU, 85–83, but then lost to North Texas in the quarterfinals, 59–61.

== Offseason ==
=== Departures ===
Departures
Name	Number	Pos.	Height	Weight	Year	Hometown	Reason for departure
Marchelus Avery	0	F	6'8"	210	Graduate student	Richmond, VA	Exhausted eligibility
Arturo Dean	2	G	5'11"	170	Senior	Miami, FL	Transferred to UCF
Jaxton Bobik	35	F	6'7"	185	RS sophomore	Queen Creek, AZ	Transferred to Northern Oklahoma-Tonkawa
Khalil Brantley	5	G	6'1"	180	Senior	Bronx, N.Y.	Exhausted eligibility
Tyler Caron	34	F	6'8"	210	Graduate student	Longview, TX	Exhausted eligibility
Davonte Davis	4	G	6'4"	185	Graduate student	Jacksonville, AR	Exhausted eligibility
Connor Dow	13	G	6'6"	200	Junior	Broken Arrow, OK	Transferred to Oral Roberts
Jamyron Keller	14	G	6'3"	210	Junior	St. Matthews, S.C.	Transferred to Louisiana
Mikey Kelvin II	23	F	6'6"	200	Graduate student	Ottawa, Canada	Transferred to FIU
Brandon Newman	6	G	6'5"	200	Graduate student	Valparaiso, IN	Exhausted eligibility
Abou Ousmane	33	F	6'10"	245	Graduate student	Brooklyn, N.Y.	Exhausted eligibility
C.J. Smith	55	F	6'7"	205	Junior	St. Matthews, S.C.	Transferred to UTEP
Patrick Suemnick	24	F	6'8"	225	Graduate student	Green Bay, WI	Transferred to Seton Hall
Bryce Thompson	1	G	6'6"	200	Graduate student	Tulsa, OK	Exhausted eligibility

=== Incoming transfers ===
Incoming transfers
Name	Number	Pos.	Height	Weight	Year	Hometown	Previous school
Kanye Clary	1	G	6'0"	190	RS junior	Virginia Beach, VA	Mississippi State
Isaiah Coleman	21	G	6'5"	200	Junior	Fredericksburg, VA	Seton Hall
Jaylen Curry	0	G	6'1"	175	RS junior	Charlotte, N.C.	UMass
Parsa Fallah	22	F	6'10"	250	RS senior	Amol, Iran	Oregon State
Vyctorius Miller	5	G	6'5"	190	Sophomore	Los Angeles, CA	LSU
Anthony Roy	9	G	6'5"	205	Graduate student	Oakland, CA	Green Bay

=== Recruiting class ===
==== 2025 recruiting class ====
College recruiting
Name	Hometown	School	Height	Weight	Commit date
Benjamin Ahmed; C	Kogi State, Nigeria	Putnam Science Academy (CT)	6 ft 10 in (2.08 m)	275 lb (125 kg)	Mar 1, 2025
Benjamin Ahmed; C	Recruit ratings: Rivals: 247Sports: ESPN: (81)				
Ryan Crotty; G	Holly Springs, N.C.	Miller School (VA)	6 ft 6 in (1.98 m)	215 lb (98 kg)	Sep 6, 2024
Ryan Crotty; G	Recruit ratings: Rivals: 247Sports: ESPN: (81)				
Daniel Guetta; G	Kiryat Gat, Israel	Maccabi Rehovot	6 ft 2 in (1.88 m)	180 lb (82 kg)	Aug 1, 2025
Daniel Guetta; G	Recruit ratings: Rivals: 247Sports: ESPN: (NA)				
Lefteris Mantzoukas; F	Iannina, Greece	Panathinaikos Athens	6 ft 9 in (2.06 m)	230 lb (100 kg)	May 23, 2025
Lefteris Mantzoukas; F	Recruit ratings: Rivals: 247Sports: ESPN: (NA)				
Mekhi Ragland; F	Lilburn, GA	Sunrise Christian Academy (KS)	6 ft 11 in (2.11 m)	330 lb (150 kg)	Oct 8, 2024
Mekhi Ragland; F	Recruit ratings: Rivals: 247Sports: ESPN: (78)				
Overall recruit ranking: Scout: 49 Rivals: 49 ESPN: NA
Note: In many cases, Scout, Rivals, 247Sports, On3, and ESPN may conflict in their listings of height and weight.; In these cases, the average was taken. ESPN grades are on a 100-point scale.; Sources: "2025 Team Ranking". Rivals.

== Preseason ==
The Big 12 preseason coaches poll was released on October 16, 2025. All awards were voted on by the league's 16 head coaches, who could not vote for their own team or players. The Big 12 preseason media poll was released on October 30, 2025.

Big 12 Preseason Coaches Poll

	Big 12 Coaches	Points
1.	Houston	224 (12)
2.	BYU	204 (1)
3.	Texas Tech	200
4.	Arizona	179 (1)
5.	Iowa State	170
6.	Kansas	163
7.	Baylor	137
8.	Cincinnati	120
9.	Kansas State	117
10.	TCU	90
11.	West Virginia	79
12.	Oklahoma State	77
13.	Utah	50
14.	UCF	39
15.	Colorado	37
16.	Arizona State	34
Reference: (#) first-place votes

Big 12 Preseason Media Poll

	Big 12 Media
1.	Houston
2.	Texas Tech
3.	BYU
4.	Arizona
5.	Iowa State
6.	Kansas
7.	Baylor
8.	Kansas State
9.	Cincinnati
10.	TCU
11.	West Virginia
12.	Oklahoma State
13.	Utah
14.	UCF
15.	Colorado
16.	Arizona State

== Roster ==
2025–26 Oklahoma State Cowboys men's basketball team
Players
Coaches

Pos.	#	Name	Height	Weight	Year	Previous school	Hometown
G	0	Jaylen Curry	6 ft 1 in (1.85 m)	175 lb (79 kg)	Jr	UMass	Charlotte, North Carolina
G	1	Kanye Clary	6 ft 0 in (1.83 m)	190 lb (86 kg)	RS Jr	Mississippi State	Virginia Beach, Virginia
F	4	Christian Coleman	6 ft 8 in (2.03 m)	215 lb (98 kg)	Sr	UAB	Winnsboro, Louisiana
G	5	Vyctorius Miller	6 ft 5 in (1.96 m)	190 lb (86 kg)	So	LSU	Los Angeles, California
G	7	Kirk Cole	6 ft 1 in (1.85 m)	165 lb (75 kg)	Sr	Troy	Yukon, Oklahoma
G	8	Daniel Guetta	6 ft 2 in (1.88 m)	180 lb (82 kg)	Fr	Maccabi Rehovot	Kiryat Gat, Israel
G	9	Anthony Roy	6 ft 5 in (1.96 m)	205 lb (93 kg)		UW-Green Bay	Oakland, California
F	13	Mekhi Ragland	6 ft 11 in (2.11 m)	330 lb (150 kg)	Fr	Sunrise Christian Academy (KS)	Lilburn, Georgia
F	19	Andrija Vukovic	6 ft 11 in (2.11 m)	270 lb (122 kg)	So	First Sport Basketball College Belgrade	Čukarica, Serbia
F	21	Isaiah Coleman	6 ft 5 in (1.96 m)	200 lb (91 kg)	So	Seton Hall	Fredericksburg, Virginia
F	22	Parsa Fallah	6 ft 10 in (2.08 m)	250 lb (113 kg)	RS Sr	Oregon State	Amol, Iran
F	23	Benjamin Ahmed	6 ft 10 in (2.08 m)	275 lb (125 kg)	Fr	Putnam Science Academy (CT)	Kogi State, Nigeria
F	24	Ryan Crotty	6 ft 6 in (1.98 m)	215 lb (98 kg)	Fr	Miller School (VA)	Holly Springs, North Carolina
F	25	Robert Jennings II	6 ft 7 in (2.01 m)	230 lb (104 kg)	Sr	Texas Tech	DeSoto, Texas
F	72	Lefteris Mantzoukas	6 ft 9 in (2.06 m)	230 lb (104 kg)	Sr	Panathinaikos Athens	Iannina, Greece

Head coach

- Steve Lutz (Texas Lutheran)

Assistant coach(es)

- James Miller (CSU Pueblo)
- Mike Ekanem (Texas Lutheran)
- Robert Guster (Missouri–Rolla)
- Keiton Page (Oklahoma State)
- Dana Valentine (Worcester State)

Legend

- (C) Team captain
- (S) Suspended
- (I) Ineligible
- (W) Walk-on
- (5Y) Fifth-year senior
- Injured
- Current redshirt

Roster
Last update: October, 22, 2025

== Schedule and results ==
Date time, TV	Rank^{#}	Opponent^{#}	Result	Record	High points	High rebounds	High assists	Site (attendance) city, state
Exhibition
October 15, 2025*; 7:00 p.m., YouTube		vs. No. 20 Auburn; Ballin' in Boutwell	W 97–95 ^{OT}	–	28 – Roy	12 – Roy	4 – Curry	Boutwell Auditorium (2,471); Birmingham, AL
October 25, 2025*; 2:00 p.m.		at SMU	L 71–86	–	16 – Miller	8 – Coleman	4 – Tied	Moody Coliseum (4,514); Dallas, TX
Non-conference regular season
November 4, 2025*; 7:00 p.m., ESPN+		Oral Roberts	W 95–71	1–0	21 – Miller	11 – Coleman	8 – Clary	Gallagher-Iba Arena (6,211); Stillwater, OK
November 9, 2025*; 1:00 p.m., ESPN2		Texas A&M	W 87–63	2–0	16 – Coleman	7 – Fallah	5 – Miller	Gallagher-Iba Arena (7,501); Stillwater, OK
November 12, 2025*; 7:00 p.m., ESPN+		Prairie View A&M	W 94–66	3–0	30 – Miller	8 – Jennings	4 – Coleman	Gallagher-Iba Arena (5,421); Stillwater, OK
November 16, 2025*; 1:00 p.m., ESPN+		Texas A&M–Corpus Christi	W 85–69	4–0	15 – Roy	10 – Mantzoukas	6 – Clary	Gallagher-Iba Arena (6,251); Stillwater, OK
November 19, 2025*; 7:00 p.m., ESPN+		South Florida	W 103–95	5–0	24 – Miller	7 – Clary	11 – Clary	Gallagher-Iba Arena (5,848); Stillwater, OK
November 22, 2025*; 2:00 p.m., ESPN+		Nicholls	W 95–81	6–0	30 – Curry	7 – Coleman	10 – Curry	Gallagher-Iba Arena (4,703); Stillwater, OK
November 27, 2025*; 9:50 p.m., BTN		vs. Northwestern; Thanksgiving Classic Chicago	W 86–81	7–0	18 – Curry	11 – Fallah	5 – Clary	United Center (10,766); Chicago, IL
December 2, 2025*; 7:00 p.m., ESPN+		Sam Houston	W 93–83	8–0	24 – Fallah	11 – Mantzoukas	6 – Clary	Gallagher-Iba Arena (5,906); Stillwater, OK
December 6, 2025*; 6:30 p.m., CBSSN		vs. Grand Canyon; Jerry Colangelo Classic	W 84–78	9–0	25 – Fallah	6 – Tied	4 – Tied	Mortgage Matchup Center; Phoenix, AZ
December 13, 2025*; 12:00 p.m., FOX		vs. Oklahoma; Bedlam Series	L 76–85	9–1	18 – Tied	7 – Curry	4 – Clary	Paycom Center (10,552); Oklahoma City, OK
December 18, 2025*; 7:00 p.m., ESPN+		Kansas City	W 91–79	10–1	20 – Coleman	10 – Coleman	7 – Curry	Gallagher-Iba Arena (4,460); Stillwater, OK
December 21, 2025*; 1:00 p.m., ESPN+		Cal State Fullerton	W 94–89	11–1	22 – Roy	7 – Vukovic	7 – Curry	Gallagher-Iba Arena (5,727); Stillwater, OK
December 29, 2025*; 7:00 p.m., ESPN+		Bethune–Cookman	W 103–77	12–1	27 – Roy	10 – Fallah	5 – Curry	Gallagher-Iba Arena (6,407); Stillwater, OK
Big 12 regular season
January 3, 2026; 12:00 p.m., ESPN2		at No. 15 Texas Tech	L 80–102	12–2 (0–1)	22 – Roy	8 – Roy	7 – Clary	United Supermarkets Arena (13,175); Lubbock, TX
January 6, 2026; 7:00 p.m., ESPN+		No. 25 UCF	W 87–76	13–2 (1–1)	24 – Fallah	9 – Clary	8 – Clary	Gallagher-Iba Arena (5,057); Stillwater, OK
January 10, 2026; 3:00 p.m., ESPN2		at No. 3 Iowa State	L 71–83	13–3 (1–2)	21 – Fallah	11 – Fallah	6 – Clary	Hilton Coliseum (14,267); Ames, IA
January 13, 2026; 8:00 p.m., CBSSN		Baylor	L 79–94	13–4 (1–3)	18 – Fallah	9 – Fallah	4 – Tied	Gallagher-Iba Arena (7,514); Stillwater, OK
January 17, 2026; 9:00 p.m., CBSSN		Kansas State	W 84–83	14–4 (2–3)	23 – Roy	9 – Fallah	6 – Clary	Gallagher-Iba Arena (6,838); Stillwater, OK
January 20, 2026; 7:00 p.m., ESPN+		at TCU	L 65–68	14–5 (2–4)	13 – Roy	4 – Tied	6 – Clary	Schollmaier Arena (4,942); Fort Worth, TX
January 24, 2026; 3:00 p.m., Peacock		No. 9 Iowa State	L 71–84	14–6 (2–5)	19 – Tied	7 – Fallah	3 – Tied	Gallagher-Iba Arena (6,280); Stillwater, OK
January 31, 2026; 1:00 p.m., TNT/TruTV		at Utah	W 81–69	15–6 (3–5)	26 – Roy	10 – Coleman	6 – Curry	Jon M. Huntsman Center (7,293); Salt Lake City, UT
February 4, 2026; 8:00 p.m., FS1		No. 16 BYU	W 99–92	16–6 (4–5)	30 – Roy	7 – Fallah	10 – Clary	Gallagher-Iba Arena (7,186); Stillwater, OK
February 7, 2026; 3:00 p.m., ESPN		at No. 1 Arizona	L 47–84	16–7 (4–6)	10 – Roy	5 – Tied	3 – Tied	McKale Center (14,688); Tucson, AZ
February 10, 2026; 8:00 p.m., CBSSN		at Arizona State	L 76–85	16–8 (4–7)	16 – Tied	6 – Tied	5 – Clary	Desert Financial Arena (5,809); Tempe, AZ
February 14, 2026; 11:00 a.m., ESPN2		TCU	L 92–95 ^{OT}	16–9 (4–8)	27 – Fallah	6 – Tied	9 – Clary	Gallagher-Iba Arena (7,098); Stillwater, OK
February 18, 2026; 8:00 p.m., ESPN2		No. 8 Kansas	L 69–81	16–10 (4–9)	21 – Fallah	8 – Coleman	4 – Roy	Gallagher-Iba Arena (9,085); Stillwater, OK
February 21, 2026; 2:30 p.m., TNT/TruTV		at Colorado	L 69–83	16–11 (4–10)	14 – Fallah	9 – Coleman	3 – Miller	CU Events Center (6,771); Boulder, CO
February 24, 2026; 6:00 p.m., CBSSN		West Virginia	W 91–84 ^{OT}	17–11 (5–10)	18 – Fallah	8 – Fallah	6 – Clary	Gallagher-Iba Arena (5,018); Stillwater, OK
February 28, 2026; 2:00 p.m., CBSSN		at Cincinnati	L 68–91	17–12 (5–11)	15 – Miller	8 – Ahmed	4 – Guetta	Fifth Third Arena (9,993); Cincinnati, OH
March 3, 2026; 6:00 p.m., ESPN+		at UCF	W 111–104 ^{OT}	18–12 (6–11)	27 – Roy	10 – Vukovic	3 – Roy	Addition Financial Arena (8,011); Orlando, FL
March 7, 2026; 11:00 a.m., CBS		No. 7 Houston	L 75–82	18–13 (6–12)	18 – Roy	7 – Coleman	4 – Clary	Gallagher-Iba Arena (6,200); Stillwater, OK
Big 12 tournament
March 10, 2026; 8:30 p.m., ESPN+	(14)	vs. (11) Colorado; 1st Round	W 92–83	19–13	24 – Roy	14 – C. Coleman	6 – Clary	T-Mobile Center (12,542); Kansas City, MO
March 10, 2026; 8:30 p.m., ESPNU	(14)	vs. (6) TCU; 2nd Round	L 88–95	19–14	25 – Roy	9 – Roy	5 – Clary	T-Mobile Center (12,811); Kansas City, MO
NIT
March 17, 2026; 7:00 p.m., ESPN2	(2 T)	Davidson; First round	W 84–80	20–14	20 – Clary	13 – C. Coleman	4 – Crotty	Gallagher-Iba Arena (1,581); Stillwater, OK
March 22, 2026; 7:30 p.m., ESPN2	(2 T)	(3 T) Wichita State; Second round	L 70–96	20–15	22 – C. Coleman	10 – C. Coleman	3 – Miller	Gallagher-Iba Arena (2,526); Stillwater, OK
*Non-conference game. ^{#}Rankings from AP poll. (#) Tournament seedings in parentheses. T=Tulsa. All times are in Central Time.

== Rankings ==
Ranking movements Legend: ██ Increase in ranking ██ Decrease in ranking — = Not ranked RV = Received votes
	Week																				
Poll	Pre	1	2	3	4	5	6	7	8	9	10	11	12	13	14	15	16	17	18	19	Final
AP	—	RV	—	RV	RV	RV	—	RV	RV	—	—	—	—	—	—	—	—	—	—	—	—
Coaches	RV	—	—	—	RV	RV	RV	RV	RV	RV	—	—	—	—	—	—	—	—	—	—	—

*AP did not release a week 8 poll.
