= 2025–26 Kansas State Wildcats men's basketball team =

American college basketball season

2025–26 Kansas State Wildcats men's basketball
- Conference: Big 12 Conference
- Record: 12–20 (3–15 Big 12)
- Head coach: Jerome Tang (4th season; first 25 games, 10−15); Matthew Driscoll (interim, rest of season)
- Assistant coaches: Jareem Dowling; Rodney Perry; Marco Borne; Anthony Winchester; Bill Peterson
- Home arena: Bramlage Coliseum

2025–26 Big 12 men's basketball standings
	Conf.				Overall
Team	W		L	PCT	W		L	PCT
No. 3 Arizona †	16	–	2	.889	36	–	3	.923
No. 7 Houston	14	–	4	.778	30	–	7	.811
No. 20 Kansas	12	–	6	.667	24	–	11	.686
No. 21 Texas Tech	12	–	6	.667	23	–	11	.676
No. 8 Iowa State	12	–	6	.667	29	–	8	.784
TCU	11	–	7	.611	23	–	12	.657
West Virginia	9	–	9	.500	21	–	14	.600
UCF	9	–	9	.500	21	–	12	.636
Cincinnati	9	–	9	.500	18	–	15	.545
BYU	9	–	9	.500	23	–	12	.657
Colorado	7	–	11	.389	17	–	16	.515
Arizona State	7	–	11	.389	17	–	16	.515
Baylor	6	–	12	.333	17	–	17	.500
Oklahoma State	6	–	12	.333	20	–	15	.571
Kansas State	3	–	15	.167	12	–	20	.375
Utah	2	–	16	.111	10	–	22	.313
† 2026 Big 12 tournament winner Rankings from AP poll

The 2025–26 Kansas State Wildcats men's basketball team represented Kansas State University in the 2025–26 NCAA Division I men's basketball season, their 123rd basketball season. The Wildcats were led by head coach Jerome Tang for the first 27 games and interim head coach Matthew Driscoll for the remainder of the season. They played their home games in Bramlage Coliseum in Manhattan, Kansas as members of the Big 12 Conference. They finished the season 12–20, 3–15 in Big 12 play to finish in 15th place. They lost in the first round of the Big 12 tournament to BYU.

On February 15, 2026, the school fired head coach Jerome Tang. The school announced that Tang had been fired for cause, looking to avoid paying him a buyout pursuant to the terms of his contract. Assistant coach Matthew Driscoll was named the interim head coach. On March 12, the school named Belmont head coach Casey Alexander the team's new head coach.

== Previous season ==
The Wildcats finished the 2024–25 season 16–17, 9–11 in Big 12 play to finish a tie for ninth place. As the No. 10 seed in the Big 12 tournament, they defeated Arizona State in the first round before losing to Baylor in the second round.

== Offseason ==
=== Departures ===
Name	Number	Pos.	Height	Weight	Year	Hometown	Reason for departure
Dug McDaniel	0	G	5'11"	175	Junior	Washington, D.C.	Transferred to Memphis
David N'Guessan	1	F	6'9"	220	Graduate Student	De Lier, Netherlands	Graduated
Max Jones	2	G	6'4"	210	Senior	Clearwater, FL	Graduated
Brendan Hausen	11	G	6'4"	205	Junior	Amarillo, TX	Transferred to Iowa
Achor Achor	14	F	6'9"	227	Senior	Melbourne, Australia	Transferred to Mississippi State
Baye Fall	21	F	6'11'	215	Sophomore	Dakar, Senegal	Transferred to Rutgers
Macaleab Rich	23	F	6'7"	240	Sophomore	East St. Louis, IL	Transferred to UTSA
Coleman Hawkins	33	F	6'10"	230	Senior	Sacramento, CA	Graduated
Ugonna Onyenso	34	C	7'0"	245	Junior	Owerri, Nigeria	Transferred to Virginia

=== Incoming transfers ===
Name	Number	Pos.	Height	Weight	Year	Hometown	Previous school
Abdi Bashir Jr.	1	G	6'7"	160	Junior	Omaha, NE	Monmouth
PJ Haggerty	4	G	6'3"	191	(redshirt) Junior	Crosby, TX	Memphis
Khamari McGriff	21	F	6'9"	210	(redshirt) Senior	Tallahassee, FL	UNC Wilmington
Stephen Osei	23	F	6'10"	210	Sophomore	Toronto, ON	Casper College
Nate Johnson	34	G	6'3"	205	(redshirt) Senior	Liberty Township, Ohio	Akron
Tyreek Smith		F	6'8"	225	Graduate Student	Baton Rouge, LA	Memphis

=== Recruiting classes ===
==== 2025 recruiting class ====
College recruiting
Name	Hometown	School	Height	Weight	Commit date
Exavier Wilson; PG	Columbia, MO	Father Tolton High School	6 ft 1 in (1.85 m)	185 lb (84 kg)	Mar 6, 2025
Exavier Wilson; PG	Recruit ratings: Rivals: 247Sports: ESPN: (NR)				
Andrej Kostić; SG	Serbia	Dynamic Belgrade	6 ft 6 in (1.98 m)	195 lb (88 kg)	Apr 29, 2025
Andrej Kostić; SG	Recruit ratings: Rivals: 247Sports: ESPN: (NR)				
Elias Rapieque; SF	Berlin, Germany	Alba Berlin	6 ft 8 in (2.03 m)	218 lb (99 kg)	Jun 4, 2025
Elias Rapieque; SF	Recruit ratings: Rivals: 247Sports: ESPN: (NR)				
Overall recruit ranking: Scout: Not Ranked Top 20 Rivals: Not Ranked Top 25 ESPN: Not Ranked Top 25
Note: In many cases, Scout, Rivals, 247Sports, On3, and ESPN may conflict in their listings of height and weight.; In these cases, the average was taken. ESPN grades are on a 100-point scale.; Sources: "2025 Kansas State Basketball Commits". Rivals.; "2025 Kansas State Basketball Commits". Scout.; "2025 Kansas State Basketball Commits". ESPN.; "Scout.com Team Recruiting Rankings". Scout.; "2025 Team Ranking". Rivals.

== Roster ==
2025–26 Kansas State Wildcats men's basketball team
Players
Coaches

Pos.	#	Name	Height	Weight	Year	Previous school	Hometown
G	3	C. J. Jones	6 ft 5 in (1.96 m)	195 lb (88 kg)	Sr	UIC	East St. Louis, Illinois
G	14	Mobi Ikegwuruka	6 ft 6 in (1.98 m)	215 lb (98 kg)	Jr	Ellsworth Community College	Galway, Ireland
G	10	David Castillo	6 ft 1 in (1.85 m)	170 lb (77 kg)	Fr	Sunrise Christian Academy (KS)	Bartlesville, Oklahoma
G	1	Abdi Bashir Jr.	6 ft 7 in (2.01 m)	160 lb (73 kg)	Jr	Monmouth	Omaha, Nebraska
C	22	Dorin Buca	7 ft 2 in (2.18 m)	2540 lb (1152 kg)	Jr	Akern Libertas Livorno	Perugia, Italy
G	4	PJ Haggerty	6 ft 3 in (1.91 m)	191 lb (87 kg)	RS Sr	Memphis	Crosby, Texas
G	34	Nate Johnson	6 ft 3 in (1.91 m)	205 lb (93 kg)	RS Sr	Akron	Liberty Township, Ohio
G	47	Andrej Kostić	6 ft 6 in (1.98 m)	195 lb (88 kg)	Fr	KK Dynamic	Serbia
G/F	15	Taj Manning	6 ft 7 in (2.01 m)	220 lb (100 kg)	RS Jr	La Lumiere School	Grandview, Missouri
F	21	Khamari McGriff	6 ft 9 in (2.06 m)	210 lb (95 kg)	RS Sr	UNC Wilmington	Tallahassee, Florida
F	23	Stephen Osei (redshirt)	6 ft 10 in (2.08 m)	210 lb (95 kg)	So	Casper College	Toronto, Ontario
F	0	Elias Rapieque	6 ft 8 in (2.03 m)	218 lb (99 kg)	Fr	Alba Berlin	Berlin, Germany
G	2	Exavier Wilson	6 ft 1 in (1.85 m)	195 lb (88 kg)	Fr	Tolton High School	Columbia, Missouri

Head coach

- Jerome Tang (Charter Oak)

Assistant coach(es)

- Matthew Driscoll (Slippery Rock)
- Jareem Dowling (Maryland Eastern Shore)
- Rodney Perry (Dallas Christian)
- Marco Borne (Dillard)
- Anthony Winchester (Western Kentucky)
- Bill Peterson (Eckerd)

Legend

- (C) Team captain
- (S) Suspended
- (I) Ineligible
- (W) Walk-on
- Injured
- Current redshirt

Roster

== Schedule and results ==
Date time, TV	Rank^{#}	Opponent^{#}	Result	Record	High points	High rebounds	High assists	Site (attendance) city, state
Exhibition
October 24, 2025*; 9:00 p.m., SECN		at Missouri	L 91–100		23 – Haggerty	6 – Tied	6 – Haggerty	Mizzou Arena; Columbia, MO
October 31, 2025*; 7:00 p.m., ESPN+		Newman	W 112–90		27 – Haggerty	6 – Ikegwuruka	10 – Haggerty	Bramlage Coliseum (6,901); Manhattan, KS
Non-conference regular season
November 4, 2025*; 7:00 p.m., ESPN+		UNC Greensboro	W 93–64	1–0	27 – Haggerty	9 – Johnson	9 – Johnson	Bramlage Coliseum (7,765); Manhattan, KS
November 8, 2025*; 7:00 p.m., ESPN+		Bellarmine	W 98–71	2–0	23 – Haggerty	7 – Johnson	11 – Haggerty	Bramlage Coliseum (8,040); Manhattan, KS
November 13, 2025*; 8:00 p.m., CBSSN		California	W 99–96	3–0	23 – Haggerty	4 – Castillo	6 – Haggerty	Bramlage Coliseum (7,521); Manhattan, KS
November 17, 2025*; 7:00 p.m., ESPN+		Tulsa	W 84–83	4–0	29 – Haggerty	10 – Haggerty	4 – Johnson	Bramlage Coliseum (7,123); Manhattan, KS
November 20, 2025*; 8:30 p.m., Peacock/NBCSN		vs. Mississippi State; Hall of Fame Classic semifinals	W 98–77	5–0	37 – Haggerty	7 – Haggerty	8 – Haggerty	T-Mobile Center; Kansas City, MO
November 21, 2025*; 8:30 p.m., Peacock/NBCSN		vs. Nebraska; Hall of Fame Classic championship	L 85–86	5–1	27 – Haggerty	6 – Haggerty	7 – Haggerty	T-Mobile Center; Kansas City, MO
November 25, 2025*; 7:00 p.m., FS1		at No. 25 Indiana	L 69–86	5–2	16 – Haggerty	5 – Tied	2 – Tied	Simon Skjodt Assembly Hall (12,342); Bloomington, IN
December 1, 2025*; 7:00 p.m., ESPN+		Bowling Green	L 66–82	5–3	22 – Castillo	7 – Ikegwuruka	2 – Tied	Bramlage Coliseum (6,917); Manhattan, KS
December 6, 2025*; 3:00 p.m., ESPNU		Seton Hall	L 67–78	5–4	12 – McGriff	8 – McGriff	6 – Haggerty	Bramlage Coliseum (9,195); Manhattan, KS
December 8, 2025*; 7:00 p.m., ESPN+		Mississippi Valley State	W 108–49	6–4	28 – Haggerty	6 – Tied	6 – Johnson	Bramlage Coliseum (6,682); Manhattan, KS
December 13, 2025*; 2:00 p.m., FOX		at Creighton	W 83–76	7–4	18 – Bashir	6 – Tied	6 – Johnson	CHI Health Center; Omaha, NE
December 20, 2025*; 11:00 a.m., ESPN+		South Dakota	W 106–76	8–4	24 – Haggerty	7 – Tied	5 – Bashir	Bramlage Coliseum (7,287); Manhattan, KS
December 28, 2025*; 1:00 p.m., ESPN+		Louisiana–Monroe	W 94–85	9–4	24 – Haggerty	8 – Haggerty	6 – Rapieque	Bramlage Coliseum (8,163); Manhattan, KS
Big 12 regular season
January 3, 2026; 12:30 p.m., CBS		No. 10 BYU	L 73–83	9–5 (0–1)	26 – Haggerty	8 – McGriff	6 – Haggerty	Bramlage Coliseum (11,010); Manhattan, KS
January 7, 2026; 8:00 p.m., FS1		at No. 1 Arizona	L 76–101	9–6 (0–2)	19 – Haggerty	7 – Manning	7 – Haggerty	McKale Center (14,357); Tucson, AZ
January 10, 2026; 2:00 p.m., Peacock		at Arizona State	L 84–87	9–7 (0–3)	25 – Haggerty	8 – Buca	4 – Bashir	Desert Financial Arena (7,133); Tempe, AZ
January 14, 2026; 7:00 p.m., Peacock		UCF	L 73–82	9–8 (0–4)	23 – Haggerty	7 – Manning	10 – Johnson	Bramlage Coliseum (7,033); Manhattan, KS
January 17, 2026; 9:00 p.m., CBSSN		at Oklahoma State	L 83–84	9–9 (0–5)	21 – Haggerty	8 – Haggerty	5 – Tied	Gallagher-Iba Arena (6,838); Stillwater, OK
January 20, 2026; 8:00 p.m., CBSSN		Utah	W 81–78	10–9 (1–5)	34 – Haggerty	8 – Haggerty	4 – Johnson	Bramlage Coliseum (8,061); Manhattan, KS
January 24, 2026; 7:00 p.m., FOX		No. 19 Kansas; Sunflower Showdown	L 62–86	10–10 (1–6)	23 – Haggerty	11 – Buca	4 – Tied	Bramlage Coliseum (9,111); Manhattan, KS
January 27, 2026; 7:30 p.m., FS1		at West Virginia	L 54–59	10–11 (1–7)	16 – Haggerty	9 – Manning	4 – Johnson	Hope Coliseum (10,809); Morgantown, WV
February 1, 2026; 1:00 p.m., FOX		No. 8 Iowa State	L 61–95	10–12 (1–8)	23 – Haggerty	9 – Haggerty	5 – Johnson	Bramlage Coliseum (8,031); Manhattan, KS
February 7, 2026; 1:00 p.m., TNT		at TCU	L 82–84	10–13 (1–9)	30 – Haggerty	6 – Manning	11 – Johnson	Schollmaier Arena (5,176); Fort Worth, TX
February 11, 2026; 8:00 p.m., CBSSN		Cincinnati	L 62–91	10–14 (1–10)	24 – Haggerty	9 – Manning	4 – Tied	Bramlage Coliseum (7,274); Manhattan, KS
February 14, 2026; 3:00 p.m., Peacock		at No. 3 Houston	L 64–78	10–15 (1–11)	23 – Haggerty	10 – Johnson	4 – Johnson	Fertitta Center (7,035); Houston, TX
February 17, 2026; 8:00 p.m., ESPN2		Baylor	W 90–74	11–15 (2–11)	34 – Haggerty	8 – Manning	9 – Johnson	Bramlage Coliseum (6,789); Manhattan, KS
February 21, 2026; 1:30 p.m., FOX		at No. 13 Texas Tech	L 72–100	11–16 (2–12)	17 – Haggerty	8 – McGriff	2 – Tied	United Supermarkets Arena (14,644); Lubbock, TX
February 25, 2026; 8:00 p.m., FS1		at Colorado	L 70–79	11–17 (2–13)	25 – Haggerty	10 – Haggerty	4 – Haggerty	CU Events Center (6,058); Boulder, CO
February 28, 2026; 5:30 p.m., ESPN2		TCU	L 68–77	11–18 (2–14)	25 – Haggerty	10 – Haggerty	4 – Haggerty	Bramlage Coliseum (8,184); Manhattan, KS
March 3, 2026; 7:00 p.m., ESPN+		West Virginia	W 65–63	12–18 (3–14)	18 – McGriff	9 – Johnson	7 – Johnson	Bramlage Coliseum (6,705); Manhattan, KS
March 7, 2026; 1:00 p.m., CBS		at No. 14 Kansas; Sunflower Showdown	L 85–104	12–19 (3–15)	21 – Tied	7 – Tied	3 – Johnson	Allen Fieldhouse (15,300); Lawrence, KS
Big 12 tournament
March 10, 2026; 6:00 p.m., ESPN+	(15)	vs. (10) BYU; 1st Round	L 91–105	12–20	27 – Haggerty	7 – Manning	3 – Johnson	T-Mobile Center (12,542); Kansas City, MO
*Non-conference game. ^{#}Rankings from AP Poll. (#) Tournament seedings in parentheses. All times are in Central Time.
