= 2025–26 Utah Utes men's basketball team =

American college basketball season

2025–26 Utah Utes men's basketball
- Conference: Big 12 Conference
- Record: 10–22 (2–16 Big 12)
- Head coach: Alex Jensen (1st season)
- Assistant coaches: Raphael Chillious (1st season); Martin Schiller (1st season); Eric Daniels (1st season)
- Home arena: Jon M. Huntsman Center (Capacity: 15,000)

2025–26 Big 12 men's basketball standings
	Conf.				Overall
Team	W		L	PCT	W		L	PCT
No. 2 Arizona †	16	–	2	.889	32	–	2	.941
No. 5 Houston	14	–	4	.778	28	–	6	.824
No. 17 Kansas	12	–	6	.667	23	–	10	.697
No. 20 Texas Tech	12	–	6	.667	22	–	10	.688
No. 6 Iowa State	12	–	6	.667	27	–	7	.794
TCU	11	–	7	.611	22	–	11	.667
West Virginia	9	–	9	.500	18	–	14	.563
UCF	9	–	9	.500	21	–	11	.656
Cincinnati	9	–	9	.500	18	–	15	.545
BYU	9	–	9	.500	23	–	11	.676
Colorado	7	–	11	.389	17	–	15	.531
Arizona State	7	–	11	.389	17	–	16	.515
Baylor	6	–	12	.333	16	–	16	.500
Oklahoma State	6	–	12	.333	20	–	14	.588
Kansas State	3	–	15	.167	12	–	20	.375
Utah	2	–	16	.111	10	–	22	.313
† 2026 Big 12 tournament winner As of March 16, 2026; Rankings from AP poll

The 2025–26 Utah Runnin' Utes men's basketball team represented the University of Utah during the 2025–26 NCAA Division I men's basketball season. The team, led by first year head coach Alex Jensen, played their home games at the Jon M. Huntsman Center located in Salt Lake City, Utah. This was the Utes' second season in the Big 12 Conference.

== Previous season ==
The Utes finished the 2024–25 season 16–17, 8–12 in Big 12 Conference play to finish in eleventh place. As the No. 11 seed in the Big 12 tournament, Utah lost their first-round game against UCF, 87−72.

The Utes' were selected to participate in the inaugural 2025 College Basketball Crown tournament. They were defeated in their first round game against Butler, 86−84.

== Offseason ==
=== Departures ===
Name	Num.	Pos.	Height	Weight	Year	Hometown	Reason for departure
Ezra Ausar	2	F	6'8"	240	Senior	Atlanta, GA	Transferred to USC
Ayomide Bamisile	21	F	6'7"	210	(redshirt) Freshman	Lagos, Nigeria	Transferred to ULM
Hunter Erickson	0	G	6'3"	200	Graduate Senior	Provo, UT	Out of eligibility
Brandon Haddock	14	G	6'2"	185	Senior	Southlake, TX	Out of eligibility
Joul Karram	5	C	6'10"	225	Sophomore	Nazareth, Israel	Transferred to Utah Valley
Zach Keller	32	F	6'10"	235	Senior	Highlands Ranch, CO	Transferred to Utah State
Miro Little	1	G	6'3"	195	Junior	Tampere, Finland	Transferred to UC Santa Barbara
Caleb Lohner	11	F	6'11"	250	Graduate Senior	Flower Mound, TX	Drafted in the 7th round of the 2025 NFL Draft by the Denver Broncos
Lawson Lovering	34	C	7'1"	245	Senior	Cheyenne, WY	Out of eligibility
Gabe Madsen	55	G	6'6"	200	Graduate Senior	Rochester, MN	Out of eligibility
Mason Madsen	45	G	6'4"	195	Graduate Senior	Rochester, MN	Out of eligibility
Mike Sharavjamts	25	G	6'9"	195	Senior	Ulaanbaatar, Mongolia	Transferred to South Carolina
Brady Smith	6	G	6'1"	175	Junior	Logan, UT	Transferred to Weber State
Jake Wahlin	10	F	6'10"	210	Junior	Provo, UT	Transferred to Clemson

=== Incoming transfers ===
Name	Num.	Pos.	Height	Weight	Year	Hometown	Previous school(s)
Terrence Brown	2	G	6'3"	175	Junior	Minneapolis, MN	Fairleigh Dickinson
Babacar Faye	5	F	6'9"	230	Graduate Senior	Dakar, Senegal	Western Kentucky
Josh Hayes	7	F	6'9"	210	Junior	Gainesville, FL	Northwest Florida State
Jahki Howard	10	F	6'7"	195	Sophomore	Roxbury, MA	Auburn
Alvin Jackson III	15	G	6'5"	215	Sophomore	Washington D.C.	Salt Lake CC
Don McHenry	3	G	6'2"	170	Graduate Senior	Milwaukee, WI	Western Kentucky
Elijah "Choppa" Moore	15	G	6'4"	215	Sophomore	Parkchester, N.Y.	Syracuse
James Okonkwo	32	F	6'8"	245	Graduate Senior	Maidenhead, England	Akron
Jacob Patrick	6	G	6'6"	195	Junior	Ludwigsburg, Germany	Otto-Hahn Gymnasium Ludwigsburg
Seydou Traore	0	F	6'6"	220	Junior	Bronx, N.Y.	Iowa

=== Recruiting classes ===
==== 2025 recruiting class ====
College recruiting information
Name	Hometown	School	Height	Weight	Commit date
Kendyl Sanders; PF	Bradenton, FL	IMG Academy	6 ft 8 in (2.03 m)	230 lb (100 kg)	Apr 16, 2025
Kendyl Sanders; PF	Recruit ratings: Scout: Rivals: 247Sports: ESPN: (81)				
Overall recruit ranking: Scout: 100 Rivals: 100 ESPN: NA
Note: In many cases, Scout, Rivals, 247Sports, On3, and ESPN may conflict in their listings of height and weight.; In these cases, the average was taken. ESPN grades are on a 100-point scale.; Sources: "2025 Utah Basketball Commitment List". Rivals.; "Utah Utes 2025 Player Commits". ESPN.; "2025 Team Ranking". Rivals.

== Preseason ==
The Big 12 preseason coaches poll was released on October 16, 2025. All awards were voted on by the league's 16 head coaches, who could not vote for their own team or players. The Big 12 preseason media poll was released on October 30, 2025.

Big 12 Preseason Coaches Poll

	Big 12 Coaches	Points
1.	Houston	224 (12)
2.	BYU	204 (1)
3.	Texas Tech	200
4.	Arizona	179 (1)
5.	Iowa State	170
6.	Kansas	163
7.	Baylor	137
8.	Cincinnati	120
9.	Kansas State	117
10.	TCU	90
11.	West Virginia	79
12.	Oklahoma State	77
13.	Utah	50
14.	UCF	39
15.	Colorado	37
16.	Arizona State	34
Reference: (#) first-place votes

Big 12 Preseason Media Poll

	Big 12 Media
1.	Houston
2.	Texas Tech
3.	BYU
4.	Arizona
5.	Iowa State
6.	Kansas
7.	Baylor
8.	Kansas State
9.	Cincinnati
10.	TCU
11.	West Virginia
12.	Oklahoma State
13.	Utah
14.	UCF
15.	Colorado
16.	Arizona State

== Roster ==
2025–26 Utah Utes men's basketball team
Players
Coaches

Pos.	#	Name	Height	Weight	Year	Previous school	Hometown
F	0	Seydou Traore	6 ft 6 in (1.98 m)	220 lb (100 kg)	Jr	Iowa	Bronx, N.Y.
G	1	Elijah Moore	6 ft 4 in (1.93 m)	185 lb (84 kg)	So	Syracuse	Parkchester, N.Y.
G	2	Terrence Brown	6 ft 3 in (1.91 m)	175 lb (79 kg)	Jr	Fairleigh Dickinson	Minneapolis, MN
G	3	Don McHenry (5Y)	6 ft 2 in (1.88 m)	170 lb (77 kg)	Sr	Western Kentucky	Milwaukee, WI
F	5	Babacar Faye (5Y)	6 ft 9 in (2.06 m)	230 lb (104 kg)	Sr	Western Kentucky	Dakar, Senegal
G	6	Jacob Patrick	6 ft 6 in (1.98 m)	195 lb (88 kg)	Jr	Otto-Hahn Gymnasium Ludwigsburg	Ludwigsburg, Germany
F	7	Josh Hayes	6 ft 9 in (2.06 m)	210 lb (95 kg)	Jr	Northwest Florida State	Gainesville, FL
F	8	Keanu Dawes	6 ft 9 in (2.06 m)	225 lb (102 kg)	Jr	Rice	Houston, TX
G	9	Jerry Huang (W)	6 ft 2 in (1.88 m)	195 lb (88 kg)	So	Wasatch Academy	Taipei, Taiwan
F	10	Jahki Howard	6 ft 7 in (2.01 m)	195 lb (88 kg)	So	Auburn	Roxbury, MA
F	13	Kendyl Sanders	6 ft 8 in (2.03 m)	230 lb (104 kg)	Fr	IMG Academy	Los Angeles, CA
G	15	Alvin Jackson III	6 ft 5 in (1.96 m)	215 lb (98 kg)	So	Salt Lake CC	Washington D.C.
G	21	Obomate Abbey	6 ft 0 in (1.83 m)	195 lb (88 kg)	Fr	Jyväskylä Basketball Academy	Jyväskylä, Finland
F	31	Ibi Traore	6 ft 9 in (2.06 m)	219 lb (99 kg)	RS Fr	West Oaks Academy	Bamako, Mali
F	32	James Okonkwo (5Y)	6 ft 8 in (2.03 m)	245 lb (111 kg)	Sr	Akron	Maidenhead, England

Head coach

- Alex Jensen (Utah)

Assistant coach(es)

- Raphael Chillious (Lafayette College)
- Martin Schiller
- Eric Daniels (Johnson & Wales University)

Legend

- (C) Team captain
- (S) Suspended
- (I) Ineligible
- (W) Walk-on
- Injured
- Current redshirt

Roster
Last update: October 27, 2025

== Schedule ==
Date time, TV	Rank^{#}	Opponent^{#}	Result	Record	High points	High rebounds	High assists	Site (attendance) city, state
Exhibition
October 17, 2025*; 7:00 p.m., ESPN+		Nevada	L 77–80	–	27 – Brown	13 – Dawes	6 – Brown	Jon M. Huntsman Center (2,193); Salt Lake City, UT
October 24, 2025*; 8:00 p.m., B1G+		at Oregon	L 53–73	–	15 – Brown	11 – Dawes	4 – Brown	Matthew Knight Arena (6,893); Eugene, OR
Non-conference regular season
November 3, 2025*; 7:00 p.m., ESPN+		San Jose State	W 84–75	1–0	23 – S. Traore	9 – Dawes	8 – Brown	Jon M. Huntsman Center (5,932); Salt Lake City, UT
November 8, 2025*; 5:00 p.m., ESPN+		Weber State	W 92–89 ^{OT}	2–0	36 – Brown	14 – Dawes	5 – Dawes	Jon M. Huntsman Center (6,214); Salt Lake City, UT
November 10, 2025*; 7:00 p.m., ESPN+		Holy Cross	W 87–69	3–0	21 – Brown	9 – Dawes	3 – Abbey	Jon M. Huntsman Center (6,570); Salt Lake City, UT
November 15, 2025*; 7:00 p.m., ESPN+		Sam Houston	W 85–79	4–0	26 – Brown	15 – Dawes	3 – Tied	Jon M. Huntsman Center (6,299); Salt Lake City, UT
November 18, 2025*; 7:00 p.m., ESPN+		Purdue Fort Wayne; Acrisure Series on-campus game	W 85–77	5–0	27 – Brown	10 – Dawes	5 – McHenry	Jon M. Huntsman Center (6,163); Salt Lake City, UT
November 20, 2025*; 7:00 p.m., ESPN+		Cal Poly	L 85–92	5–1	29 – Brown	7 – Dawes	4 – Traore	Jon M. Huntsman Center (6,163); Salt Lake City, UT
November 25, 2025*; 10:00 p.m., CBSSN		vs. Grand Canyon; Acrisure Classic semifinals	L 58–68	5–2	16 – McHenry	12 – Dawes	3 – Abbey	Acrisure Arena; Thousand Palms, CA
November 26, 2025*; 10:00 p.m., CBSSN		vs. Ole Miss; Acrisure Classic third-place game	W 75–74	6–2	27 – McHenry	8 – Sanders	4 – Brown	Acrisure Arena; Thousand Palms, CA
December 2, 2025*; 8:00 p.m., ACCNX		at California	L 72–79	6–3	15 – Brown	9 – Dawes	5 – Dawes	Haas Pavilion (2,783); Berkeley, CA
December 6, 2025*; 5:00 p.m., ESPN+		California Baptist	W 91–85	7–3	27 – Brown	6 – Dawes	7 – Dawes	Jon M. Huntsman Center (6,077); Salt Lake City, UT
December 13, 2025*; 8:00 p.m., ESPNU		vs. Mississippi State; Salt Lake Showcase	L 74–82	7–4	29 – McHenry	7 – Sanders	3 – Tied	Delta Center; Salt Lake City, UT
December 20, 2025*; 5:00 p.m., ESPN+		Eastern Washington	W 101–77	8–4	27 – McHenry	9 – Dawes	11 – Brown	Jon M. Huntsman Center (6,116); Salt Lake City, UT
December 29, 2025*; 9:00 p.m., FS1		at Washington	L 65–74	8–5	21 – Brown	9 – Dawes	4 – Brown	Alaska Airlines Arena (7,721); Seattle, WA
Big 12 regular season
January 3, 2026; 2:00 p.m., Peacock		No. 1 Arizona	L 78–97	8–6 (0–1)	26 – Brown	9 – Dawes	6 – Brown	Jon M. Huntsman Center (8,339); Salt Lake City, UT
January 7, 2026; 4:00 p.m., ESPN+		at Colorado; Rivalry	L 73–85	8–7 (0–2)	24 – McHenry	8 – McHenry	3 – Brown	CU Events Center (6,768); Boulder, CO
January 10, 2026; 8:00 p.m., ESPN		No. 9 BYU; Rivalry	L 84–89	8–8 (0–3)	25 – Brown	13 – Okonkwo	5 – Brown	Jon M. Huntsman Center (15,558); Salt Lake City, UT
January 14, 2026; 7:00 p.m., Peacock		at No. 15 Texas Tech	L 74–88	8–9 (0–4)	18 – Tied	8 – Dawes	4 – Brown	United Supermarkets Arena (13,803); Lubbock, TX
January 17, 2026; 12:00 p.m., TNT/TruTV		TCU	W 82–79	9–9 (1–4)	26 – Brown	14 – Dawes	4 – Tied	Jon M. Huntsman Center (6,544); Salt Lake City, UT
January 20, 2026; 7:00 p.m., CBSSN		at Kansas State	L 78–81	9–10 (1–5)	33 – Brown	7 – Dawes	3 – Tied	Bramlage Coliseum (8,061); Manhattan, KS
January 24, 2026; 3:30 p.m., FOX		at No. 13 BYU; Rivalry	L 78–91	9–11 (1–6)	23 – Dawes	6 – Tied	4 – Tied	Marriott Center (18,224); Provo, UT
January 31, 2026; 12:00 p.m., ESPN2		Oklahoma State	L 69–81	9–12 (1–7)	20 – Brown	10 – Dawes	4 – Brown	Jon M. Huntsman Center (7,293); Salt Lake City, UT
February 4, 2026; 7:00 p.m., CBSSN		Arizona State	L 63–71	9–13 (1–8)	23 – McHenry	14 – Okonkwo	6 – Brown	Jon M. Huntsman Center (6,650); Salt Lake City, UT
February 7, 2026; 12:30 p.m., FOX		at No. 11 Kansas	L 59–71	9–14 (1–9)	22 – Dawes	12 – Dawes	3 – Tied	Allen Fieldhouse (15,300); Lawrence, KS
February 10, 2026; 7:00 p.m., ESPN2		No. 3 Houston	L 52–66	9–15 (1–10)	15 – Dawes	8 – Dawes	4 – Tied	Jon M. Huntsman Center (7,111); Salt Lake City, UT
February 15, 2026; 10:00 a.m., ESPN		at Cincinnati	L 65–69	9–16 (1–11)	18 – McHenry	14 – Dawes	3 – McHenry	Fifth Third Arena (9,988); Cincinnati, OH
February 18, 2026; 6:30 p.m., FS1		at West Virginia	W 61–56	10–16 (2–11)	17 – Traore	8 – Brown	3 – Brown	WVU Coliseum (10,527); Morgantown, WV
February 21, 2026; 7:00 p.m., ESPN+		UCF	L 71–73	10–17 (2–12)	21 – Brown	12 – Dawes	4 – Brown	Jon M. Huntsman Center (7,686); Salt Lake City, UT
February 24, 2026; 7:00 p.m., FS1		No. 4 Iowa State	L 59–75	10–18 (2–13)	18 – Brown	12 – Dawes	3 – Tied	Jon M. Huntsman Center (6,867); Salt Lake City, UT
February 28, 2026; 1:30 p.m., TNT/TruTV		at Arizona State	L 60–73	10–19 (2–14)	14 – McHenry	9 – Okonkwo	4 – Traore	Desert Financial Arena (7,718); Tempe, AZ
March 3, 2026; 7:00 p.m., ESPN+		Colorado; Rivalry	L 78–92	10–20 (2–15)	26 – Brown	5 – Sanders	4 – Tied	Jon M. Huntsman Center (6,975); Salt Lake City, UT
March 7, 2026; 3:00 p.m., Peacock		at Baylor	L 75–101	10–21 (2–16)	20 – McHenry	4 – McHenry	5 – Brown	Foster Pavilion (7,011); Waco, TX
Big 12 tournament
March 10, 2026; 1:00 p.m., ESPN+	(16)	vs. (9) Cincinnati; First Round	L 66–73	10–22	22 – Brown	10 – Dawes	6 – Brown	T-Mobile Center (7,238); Kansas City, MO
*Non-conference game. ^{#}Rankings from AP poll. (#) Tournament seedings in parentheses. All times are in Mountain Time.
