= Arizona Wildcats men's basketball =

University of Arizona team

2026–27 Arizona Wildcats men's basketball team
- University: University of Arizona
- First season: 1904–05; 122 years ago
- Athletic director: Desiree Reed-Francois
- Head coach: Tommy Lloyd; 6th season, 152–37 (.804)
- Location: Tucson, Arizona
- Arena: McKale Center (capacity: 14,688)
- NCAA division: Division I
- Conference: Big 12
- Nickname: Wildcats
- Colors: Cardinal and navy
- All-time record: 1,953–1,004–1 (.660)
- NCAA tournament record: 66–39 (.629)

NCAA Division I tournament champions
- 1997
Other NCAA Division I tournament results
Runner-up	2001
Final Four	1988, 1994, 1997, 2001, 2026
Elite Eight	1976, 1988, 1994, 1997, 1998, 2001, 2003, 2005, 2011, 2014, 2015, 2026
Sweet Sixteen	1976, 1988, 1989, 1991, 1994, 1996, 1997, 1998, 2001, 2002, 2003, 2005, 2009, 2011, 2013, 2014, 2015, 2017, 2022, 2024, 2025, 2026
Appearances	1951, 1976, 1977, 1985, 1986, 1987, 1988, 1989, 1990, 1991, 1992, 1993, 1994, 1995, 1996, 1997, 1998, 1999, 2000, 2001, 2002, 2003, 2004, 2005, 2006, 2007, 2008, 2009, 2011, 2013, 2014, 2015, 2016, 2017, 2018, 2022, 2023, 2024, 2025, 2026

Conference tournament champions
- Pac-12: 1988, 1989, 1990, 2002, 2015, 2017, 2018, 2022, 2023 Big 12: 2026

Conference regular-season champions
- Border: 1932, 1936, 1946, 1947, 1948, 1949, 1950, 1951, 1953 WAC: 1976 Pac-12: 1986, 1988, 1989, 1990, 1991, 1993, 1994, 1998, 2000, 2003, 2005, 2011, 2014, 2015, 2017, 2018, 2022, 2024 Big 12: 2026

Uniforms
Home	Away	Alternate

The Arizona Wildcats men's basketball team is the intercollegiate men's basketball program representing the University of Arizona in Tucson, Arizona. They compete in the Big 12 of NCAA Division I and are coached by Tommy Lloyd. From 1978 until 2024, Arizona had spent 45 seasons in the Pac-10/12.

The program came to national prominence during the tenure of former head coach Lute Olson (1983−2007), who established the program as among America's elite in college basketball. One writer referred to U of A as "Point Guard U" because the school has produced successful guards like Steve Kerr, Damon Stoudamire, Khalid Reeves, Mike Bibby, Jason Terry, Gilbert Arenas, Jason Gardner, Jerryd Bayless, T. J. McConnell, Caleb Love and Jaden Bradley.

From 1985 to 2009, the Arizona basketball team reached the NCAA Division I tournament for 25 consecutive years, tied for third longest in NCAA history. Despite having their 1999 and 2008 appearances later vacated by the NCAA, the media still cites Arizona's streak, and simply notes the changes. The Wildcats have reached the Final Four of the NCAA tournament on five occasions (1988, 1994, 1997, 2001, and 2026). They have also made two appearances in the National Championship (won over Kentucky Wildcats in 1997, lost to Duke Blue Devils in 2001). In Pac-10 play, former head coach Lute Olson currently holds the record for most wins as a Pac-10 coach with 327. In addition, the team has won 19 Pac-10/12 & Big 12 regular season championship titles and 9 Pac-10/12 tournament championship titles. Arizona also holds the distinction of recording five out of the seven 17–1 Pac-10 seasons (one-loss seasons). In 2022 Arizona became the first team in conference history to win 18 conference games in a season. No team has gone undefeated since the formation of the Pac-10/12.

Arizona ranks thirteenth all-time heading into the 2026–27 season with 1,949 wins and ranks seventh by winning percentage at (.660). Arizona has spent 48 weeks at No. 1 in the AP Poll, which is seventh most all-time; 36 weeks at No. 2, tied for eighth most all-time; 194 weeks in the top 5, tied for sixth all-time; 367 weeks in the Top 10, sixth all-time; and 641 weeks in the top 25, seventh all-time.

== Team history ==
=== Early years (1904−1925) ===
The University of Arizona fielded its first men's basketball team in 1904–05. Orin Albert Kates coached the team and drew opponents from local YMCAs. The first game Arizona played ended in a 40–32 victory over the Morenci YMCA.

In 1914, Arizona's first famous coach, James Fred "Pop" McKale was lured away from a teaching and coaching job at Tucson High School to take over as Athletic Director and coach basketball, football, baseball and track. McKale took things to a new level, posting a 9–0 record his first season as a basketball coach. Moreover, McKale elevated the program to intercollegiate play. While basketball was his least favorite of the many sports he coached while at U of A, he chalked up three undefeated seasons and a career-winning average of .803, which has never been bested by a U of A coach who has held the post for at least three years. The McKale Memorial Center, the main arena for Arizona basketball, is named in his honor.

=== Fred Enke (1925−61) ===
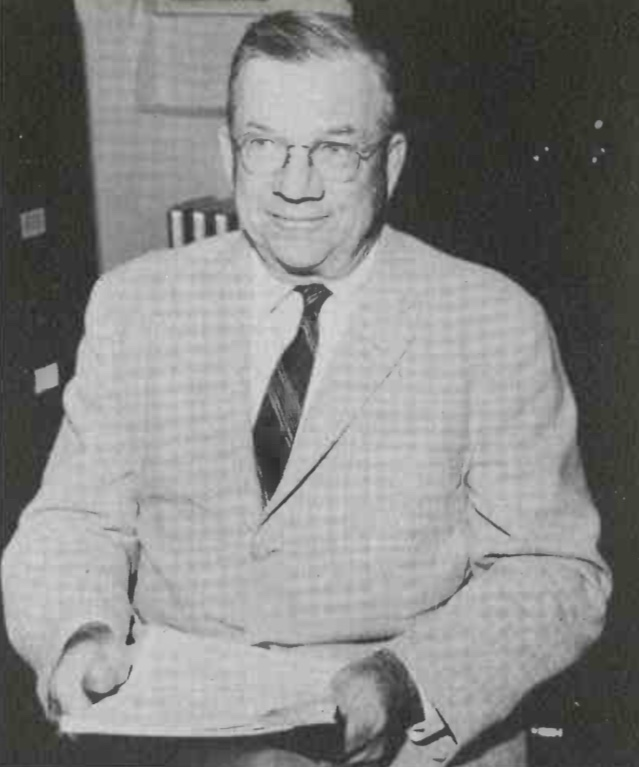
Fred Enke in 1960

From 1925 to 1961, the program was under the stewardship of Fred Enke, U of A's longest-tenured coach. Coach Fred A. Enke was responsible for the early successes of Wildcat basketball. Enke amassed 509 wins in his tenure on the U of A sidelines and still ranks as the second-winningest coach in school history, winning more than 60 percent of his games. Enke also led the Cats to the first four postseason appearances (3 N.I.T. and 1 NCAA) in school history and in 1950–51 competed in both the N.I.T. and NCAA postseason tournaments. Finally, he was the first coach to lead Arizona to a national ranking. Two of his teams (1950, 1951) finished the season ranked in the top 15.

Under Enke, U of A competed in the now-defunct Border Conference. Under Enke's direction, Arizona won 12 conference championships, including a span in which the Cats won or shared seven consecutive Border Conference titles (1942–51). No Border Conference team won as many league games (231) or overall contests (398) during its membership. In 1962, Arizona joined the Western Athletic Conference as a founding member after the Border Conference disbanded.

=== Bruce Larson (1961−71) ===
Bruce Larson, a player and assistant under Enke before coaching at Eastern Arizona and Weber State, coached the Wildcats from 1961 to 1971, leading the school to a 136–148 record. Under his tenure, major planning began for a larger and more modern basketball arena (which would become McKale Center) to replace the outdated Bear Down Gymnasium. Larson would later serve as an analyst on Wildcat football and basketball telecasts during the Lute Olson (and Dick Tomey) era.

=== Fred Snowden (1973−1982) ===
In 1972, Fred Snowden was hired as the head basketball coach, making Arizona the second Division I school and the first major program to hire an African American head coach. Known as "The Fox", Snowden brought the excitement back to Wildcat basketball during his 10 years on the Arizona sideline, averaging more than 80 points per game in six of his 10 years and topping the 100-point barrier 27 times. Snowden led Arizona to the NCAA tournament twice, in 1976 and 1977, getting as far as the Elite Eight in 1976 before losing to UCLA 82–66, a game after defeating UNLV in a Sweet Sixteen matchup. During the 1976 tournament, he also logged Arizona's first and only tournament wins until Lute Olson's hiring, beating John Thompson's Georgetown team 83–76. Snowden's 1976 team also won the school's only WAC championship title on a buzzer-beater by Gilbert Myles verses New Mexico, with the help of the spectacular play of Bob Elliott, Jim Rappis, and Al Fleming. In 1978, Coach Snowden helped transition the basketball program over to the newly formed Pac-10. Snowden could not sustain success in the Pac-10, however, finishing no higher than 4th place in the conference. His 9–18 final season led U of A to look for a replacement.

Known for his high-octane offense and remembered as a trailblazer, Fred "The Fox" Snowden brought excitement to Arizona basketball during his 10-year tenure as the program's head coach. Snowden, who led the Wildcats from 1972 to 1982, was the first African-American head basketball coach at an NCAA Division I institution, amassing a 167–108 mark. The 1973 Western Athletic Conference Coach of the Year, his career winning percentage of .607 has been topped by only three U of A coaches since 1924. Nicknamed "The Fox" due to his cool demeanor, Snowden led Arizona to three postseason berths, including the 1975 National Commissioners’ Invitational Tournament and the 1976 and 1977 NCAA tournaments. His best season came in 1976, when the Wildcats went 24–9, won the Western Athletic Conference championship and advanced to the NCAA West Regional Final. The Brewton, Ala., native was the head coach who led Arizona into the Pac-10 in the 1978–79 season, guiding the program for its first four seasons in the Conference. Snowden also oversaw the transition into the McKale Center after its opening in 1973. He was inducted into the Arizona Sports Hall of Fame in 1988. Prior to his role at Arizona, Snowden was an assistant coach at Michigan. He also served on the coaching staff of his high school, Northwestern High School in Detroit, Mich., where he coached for five years after attending Wayne State University from 1954 to 1958. Snowden died in 1994 at the age of 57.

Athletic Director Dave Strack brought in Ben Lindsey to replace Fred Snowden in 1983, and on the surface, it seemed like a reasonable move. Lindsey had junior college expertise, having had a successful career at Grand Canyon University, where he won two national titles. What resulted, however, was nothing short of disaster. The 1983 team finished with the worst season in school history at 4–24, with only one Pac-10 win.

=== Lute Olson (1983−2007) ===
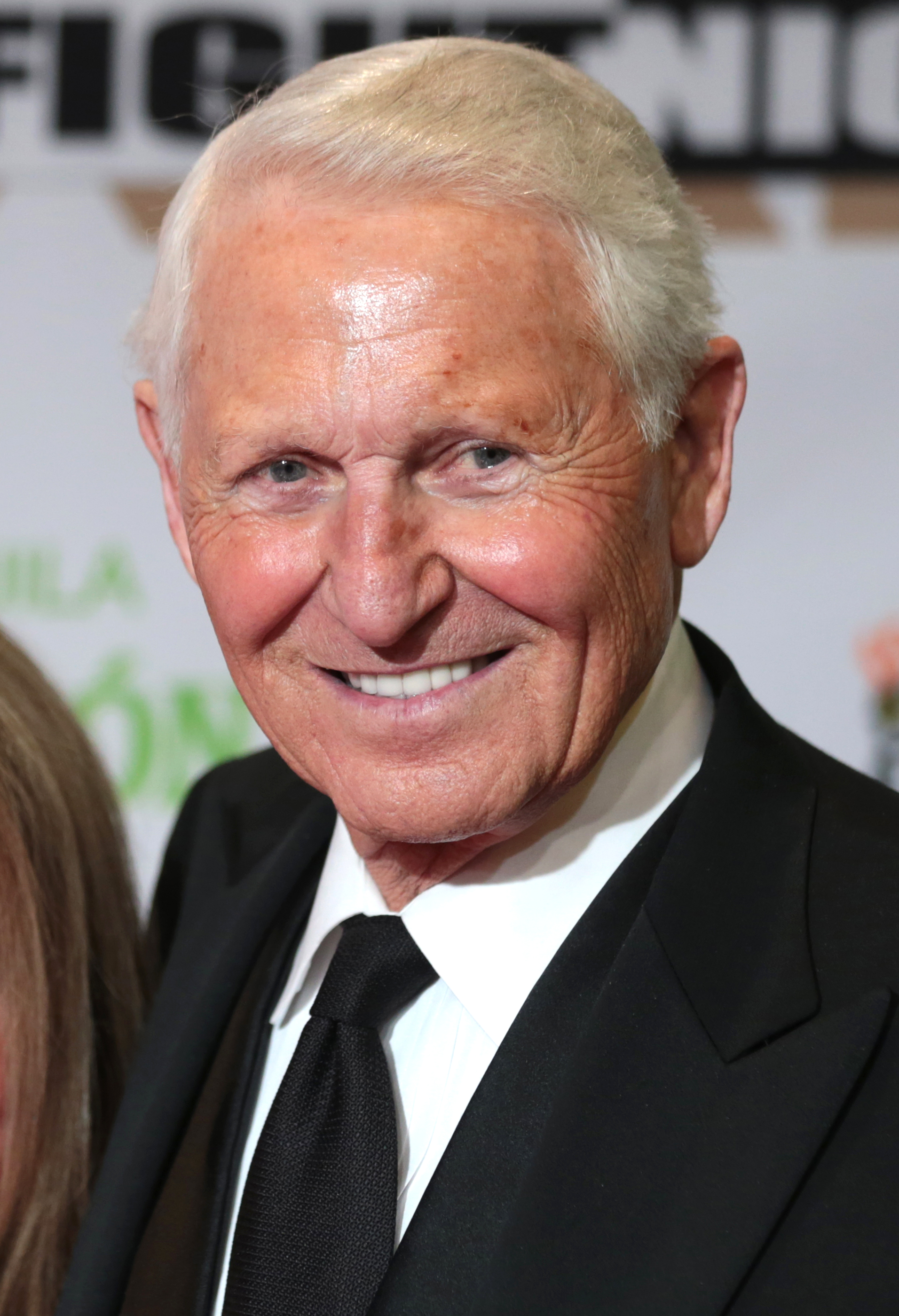
Lute Olson in 2017. Olson had an overall record of 589–187 at Arizona, the 2nd most wins by a coach in Pac-10/12 history

==== Olson's first class and 1st Final Four ====
Newly hired U of A Athletic Director Cedric Dempsey fired Lindsey after only one season and hired University of Iowa coach Lute Olson as his successor. U of A needed a coach with a history of quickly turning around programs, which Olson had done previously at Iowa. "I knew we had a tremendous amount of work to do", Olson recalled in a recent interview with Tucson Lifestyle. "The program was in shambles at that point, after the terrible year before..."

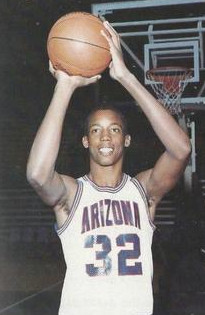
All-American Sean Elliott won several national college basketball awards and set the school's scoring record while helping lead the Wildcats to the Final Four in 1988.

Under Olson, Arizona quickly rose to national prominence. Arizona won its first Pac-10 title in 1986, only three years after his arrival. That season set up an amazing 1987–88 season, which included taking the Great Alaska Shootout championship, the Valley Bank Fiesta Bowl Classic championship and the Pac-10 championship. Under players Steve Kerr, Kenny Lofton, and Sean Elliott, Arizona spent much of the season ranked No. 1 and made their first (and Olson's second) Final Four. While Arizona lost in the Final Four round, their play put the program on the map and launched Arizona's reign as a perennial Pac-10 and NCAA tournament contender. Sean Elliott was awarded the John R. Wooden Award on the season and set the PAC-10 scoring record.

==== The road to a first championship (1997) ====
In 1997, Arizona defeated the University of Kentucky, the defending national champions, to win the NCAA national championship. Prior to winning the championship in 1997, Arizona stormed back from 10-point deficits in the Southeast Regional First round and Second Round against #13 South Alabama and #12 College of Charleston, respectively winning 65–57 and 73–69. The Southeast Regional semifinal pitted Arizona against overall #1 Kansas (34–1) which had defeated Arizona the year before in the 1996 West Regional semifinal. However, Arizona came out fast and stunned the Jayhawks 85–82, then prevailed in overtime against Providence 96–92 in the Elite Eight to clinch a berth in the Final Four. Arizona then beat #1 seed North Carolina 66–58 in the Final Four, which turned out to be Dean Smith's last game as a coach. Arizona also accomplished the unprecedented feat of beating three number one seeds in the 1997 NCAA Division I men's basketball tournament. This feat has never been accomplished by another team.

==== Later years and 1999 NCAA sanctions under Olson ====
The year following the Championship season, 1998, Arizona returned all 5 starters (Mike Bibby, Michael Dickerson, Miles Simon, Bennett Davison, and A. J. Bramlett) and were poised to make another run after receiving the #1 overall seed in the West, but were upset by Utah in the Elite 8.

In 1999, all 5 starters were lost to graduation or early entry to the NBA draft and Arizona's hopes of continuing its streak of consecutive trips to the NCAA tournament was in jeopardy until senior point guard Jason Terry (the 6th man the previous two seasons) elevated his game (receiving National Player of the Year honors) and continued the school's amazing streak.

In 2000, former Wildcat Jason Terry, stated that he received approximately $4,500 in cash, checks and wire transfers from New York sports agent Larry Fox, after his junior season. The NCAA announced that as a result a one-game 1999 NCAA tournament appearance was formally vacated. In addition, Arizona asked Terry to repay the $45,363 in forfeited NCAA 1999 tournament revenue and banned him from the U of A Sports Hall of Fame, including a provision that his jersey would not be retired. Terry's jersey was later retired in 2015.

==== NCAA finalist (2001) ====
2001 was one of the most challenging and rewarding years for the program. Lute Olson's wife Bobbi, well known to players and fans alike as a steadfast presence on the sidelines, died of cancer. The team, which had been a preseason pick by many to win the national title had to play without Olson for three weeks while Olson was on bereavement leave. The Cats vowed to dedicate their season to Bobbi. With guard Jason Gardner, center Loren Woods and forward Michael Wright — each an All-American — leading the way, the Cats trounced their opponents, beating Oregon 104–65, devastating USC 105–61, and charging through the Final Four. They took down Eastern Illinois, Butler, Mississippi, Illinois, and Michigan State, only to be stopped by Duke in the title game. While being considered the favorite to win the title, which would have been Coach Olson's second and tied him with Coach Mike Krzyzewski, his opponent, the Blue Devils claimed a ten-point victory in the game. The 2001 championship game marked Olson's final appearance as a coach in the Final Four.

==== Later years and further NCAA sanctions under Olson (2002−2008) ====
In his later years at U of A, Olson continued to field competitive teams with highly regarded point guards, contributing to the program's reputation of nickname "Point Guard U." Recent standouts include Jason Gardner, Salim Stoudamire, Mustafa Shakur, Jerryd Bayless and Nic Wise. Arizona won Olson's last Pac-10 title during the 2004–2005 season behind the play of seniors Salim Stoudamire and center Channing Frye. That team advanced to the Elite 8 and the verge of the Final Four before losing in overtime, 90–89, to top-seeded and eventual national runner-up, University of Illinois.

Olson took an unexplained leave of absence at the beginning of the 2007–2008 season. Assistant coach Kevin O'Neill took over interim head coaching duties for the Arizona Wildcats. At that time, Olson announced that he intended to be back for the 2008–09 season and finish out his contract, which was scheduled to end in 2011. His departure was criticized by some members of the media. They also questioned how he and the U of A athletic department handled his return and the verbal succession agreement with coach O'Neill. However, on October 23, 2008, he unexpectedly announced his retirement from the program (by way of an announcement from Arizona athletic director Jim Livengood). A few days later, Olson's personal physician held a press conference and explained that the retirement was strongly advised due to health concerns.

After Lute Olson's abrupt retirement, Arizona Athletic Director Jim Livengood appointed assistant coach Russ Pennell as the interim head coach for the 2008–2009 season 23 days before the start of the season. The appointment came after Mike Dunlap, the associate head coach brought in to replace Kevin O'Neill, turned down the job. Under Pennell, the Cats finished 19–13 in the regular season, including a non-conference win over Kansas and a 7-game win streak with wins over UCLA and Washington. Despite a 19–13 finish to the season, Arizona was controversially selected as one of the last teams into the field of 65 as a 12th seed in the Midwest region, extending its NCAA consecutive tournament appearances to 25 years. The Cats made it to the Sweet 16 (regional semi-finals) with wins over 5-seed Utah and 13-seed Cleveland State, before falling to overall 1-seed, Louisville. Despite Pennell's post-season success, he was not retained, as Arizona announced before his hiring that they would hold a national coaching search after the season ended. (On April 9, 2009, Pennell was hired as head coach of the men's basketball team at Division II Grand Canyon University, a member of the Pacific West Conference.)

Following Olson's retirement, reports of NCAA violations arose regarding payment of impermissible benefits to players and recruiting violations. In response, Arizona self-imposed sanctions that included a reduction in the number of recruiting visits by coaches and prospective players, the disbanding of a booster group, and implementation of a series of administrative and rules changes to prevent further violations. The NCAA upheld most of those self-imposed sanctions, but determined the school had used two ineligible players in 2007-08 and would have to vacate all wins involving those players and eliminate their statistics. The NCAA reduced the number of scholarships and visits with recruits Arizona was allowed to make. The NCAA found that Olson failed to promote an atmosphere of compliance at the university but decided against sanctioning the coach because he was retired and had health issues. "I think that was my fault," Olson said during a 2008 interview with ESPN.com. "That wasn't anyone else's fault. It was my error and it was a big error. But I guess in 26 years you are allowed to make a mistake once in a while anyway and that's not to say I haven't made a lot of them but in terms of that, that was a big mistake on my part."

=== Sean Miller (2009−2021) ===
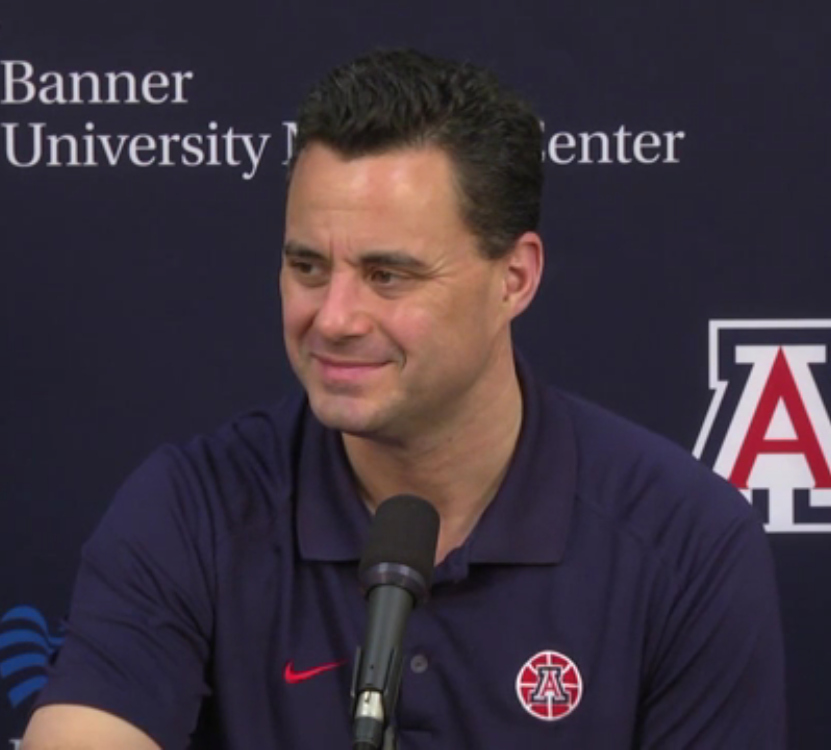
Sean Miller at Arizona

After the end of the season, various coaching names were considered to succeed Lute Olson on a permanent basis. Arizona was perceived to have interest in Gonzaga's Mark Few, Pittsburgh's Jamie Dixon and then-Memphis coach John Calipari (before he accepted the vacant position at Kentucky) to take the job. Arizona even brought USC's Tim Floyd on campus for an interview and while Arizona claims no formal offer was ever presented, Floyd ultimately turned down the job publicly.

==== First season (2009−10) ====
Arizona hired Sean Miller from Xavier University to fill the head coaching position. He initially turned the job down before changing his mind and accepting the job on Apr. 6, 2009 despite having never visited the Arizona campus. Miller was formally introduced as the 13th head men's basketball coach at Arizona at a press conference on April 7, 2009, at McKale Center. At the press conference, Miller acknowledged Lute Olson's impact on the Arizona program by addressing Olson personally: "One of the reasons I sit here today is because of the great legacy you built." Miller also promised U of A fans that they would enjoy the style of both offense and defense he would bring to Wildcat basketball. Miller's salary is $1.6 million per year; he will receive an additional $400,000 per season from Nike and media contracts during a five-year deal, as well as a $1 million signing bonus and other amenities such as season tickets to other Wildcat sporting events and the use of a private jet. Within three months of joining the program, Miller compiled a strong five-player recruiting class that ranked 13th nationally in 2009. After going 16–15 and missing the NCAA tournament for the first time in 25 years during Miller's initial 2009–10 campaign.

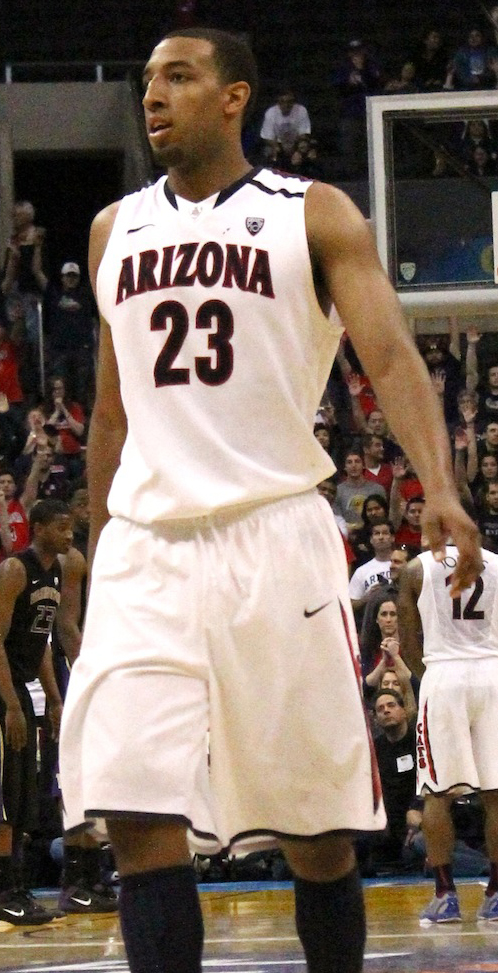
Derrick Williams

==== Three Elite Eights under Miller (2011, 2014−15) ====
In his second season as the head coach at Arizona, the Cats finished the season with 30–8, 14–4 Pac-12 play, behind the play of sophomore Pac-10 Player of the Year Derrick Williams. This was the Wildcats' first outright Pac-10 regular season title (its 12th overall), 4th 30+ win season (1st overall) and Elite Eight appearance (8th overall) since the 2004–2005 season. In addition, Miller led the Wildcats to their first unbeaten home record (17–0) in 14 years and was named Pac-10 Coach of the Year. This was the first time an Arizona coach received this honor since Lute Olson in 2003. The 17 wins without a loss at home is tied for the second-most in school history. Miller added to the season's success by guiding the Cats to their first Elite Eight appearance since the 2004–2005 Season as a 5-seed. In the second round, Arizona secured a 2-point victory over 12th seeded Memphis (coached by former Wildcat (and member of the 1997 national title team) Josh Pastner) with a blocked shot in the final seconds by Derrick Williams. Arizona followed with another close game, a controversial one-point win against 4-seed Texas. In the Sweet-16 match-up, Arizona found itself pitted against top-seeded Duke, the first time since the 2001 title game that the two schools had met. Duke extended an early lead, but 25 points from Derrick Williams kept the Cats in the game and down by 6 points at the half. In the second half, Williams' teammates picked up the slack, dominating the Blue Devils by scoring 55 second-half points and routing the defending champs 93–77. Arizona's run at the Final Four fell 2 points short, losing to 3-seed (and eventual national champion) Connecticut 65–63.

For his third season, Arizona's 2011 recruiting class was ranked 7th, notably signing Nick Johnson and Josiah Turner. Arizona secured three players in the top nine of the ESPNU 100, with all four newly signed players within the top 36. This has cemented Arizona as the No. 1 signing class nationally, surpassing Kentucky who held the No. 1 spot 2010 and 2011. The Wildcats missed the postseason for the second time, reached to the NIT Tournament before falling to Bucknell to finish the season 23–12 overall, 12–6 in Pac-12.

In his fourth season, Miller guided to its second top-5 ranking in the AP poll (the first coming in weeks 7–10 of the 2012–2013 season), Arizona reached the Sweet 16 in 2013 falling to Ohio State, finished the season with 27–8, 12–6 in Pac-12.

In his fifth season with the most talent Coach Miller has had since arriving in Tucson. On December 9, 2013, Arizona became the #1 ranked Team in the Country for the 6th time in school history, after a 9–0 start with wins over traditional national powerhouses Duke and UNLV. The Wildcats followed this up by securing a key come-from-behind victory on the road at Michigan on December 14 and led the Wildcats to their second outright Pac-12 Regular Season Title (its 13th overall, 26th regular season overall) in Sean Miller's fifth year as the head coach. Arizona reached the second unbeaten home record at (18–0), Coach Miller again named the second Pac-10/12 coach of the year, 5th 30+ wins season (2nd overall), 2nd Elite Eight appearance (9th overall) in 2014. However, in the 2014 NCAA tournament, the Wildcats fell to Wisconsin in overtime, they finished the season with 33–5, 15–3 in Pac-12.

In his sixth season as the Arizona Wildcats basketball head coach, after Gonzaga's home loss to BYU on February 28, 2015, Arizona claimed the longest active home winning streak in D-I men's college basketball (38th home win at 2nd all-time, 82nd home win at 5th all-time). Arizona defeated #13 Utah in Salt Lake City the same day, winning its share of the Pac-12 regular season title. After three losses to Pac-12 archrival Arizona State, Oregon State and UNLV, Arizona won their third Pac-12 regular season championship title (2nd straight year, its 14th overall, 27th overall). Arizona reached the third unbeaten home record at (17–0). The Wildcats completes their sixth ever 30+ win (3rd overall) and won their first Pac-12 Tournament title (5th overall) since 2002. In the 2015 NCAA tournament, the Wildcats fell to the Wisconsin Badgers for a 2nd consecutive season in the Elite Eight, 85–78, and finished the season 34–4, 16–2 in the Pac-12.

In his seventh season, they finished the season 25–9, 12–6 in Pac-12 play to tie with California for third place. They defeated Colorado in the quarterfinals of the Pac-12 Tournament to advance to the semifinals where they lost to Oregon. In the 2016 NCAA Tournament, as a 6-seed in the South Region. They lost in the first round to Wichita State.

In his eighth season at U of A, AP polls and 81 straight coaches' polls. The 97-consecutive weeks in the AP poll is currently the second-longest streak in the nation behind Kansas at 161 weeks.[1] They have been ranked every week in the 2016–2017 season, bringing those totals to 97 weeks for the AP and 100 weeks for the coaches' poll. Arizona won its first 10 conference games, the best start since the '97-'98 season when they started 16–0. They finished the season at seventh ever 30+ wins with 32–5, tied at 16–2 with Oregon in Pac-12 play for first place to win their 3rd Pac-12 regular season championship title for the 15th time (28th overall). The Wildcats entered the Pac-12 Tournament as a 2-seed, the Wildcats defeated 7-seed Colorado in the quarterfinals, 3-seed UCLA in the semifinals and 1-seed Oregon in the championship game, Wildcats won their 2nd Pac-12 Tournament championship title for the 6th time. In the 2017 NCAA Tournament, as a 2-seed in the West regional, Arizona defeated the 15-seed North Dakota 100–82 in the first round, 7-seed Saint Mary's 69–60 in the second round and losing to Xavier 73–71 in the Sweet Sixteen.

==== Later seasons, 2021 post-season ban, 2017−2018 NCAA sanctions under Miller (2018−2021) ====
As Miller's ninth season as the head coach at Arizona was about to get underway, federal prosecutors announced, on September 26, 2017, bribery, soliciting a bribe and wire fraud charges against assistant coach Emanuel "Book" Richardson as part of a far-reaching, college basketball-wide scandal. Perhaps in part due to the ongoing scandal, the Wildcats ranked No. 2 in the country at one point, lost three games at the Battle 4 Atlantis tournament. Arizona eventually fired Richardson for his role in the scandal, and the team recovered to lead the Pac 12 for the majority of the season. On February 24, 2018, Associate head coach Lorenzo Romar was temporarily named head coach after news broke the previous day that Miller had been caught on an FBI wiretap offering to pay players to come to Arizona. On March 1, Miller held a joint press conference with the university denying all allegations and stating that he would be retained as men's head basketball coach. That same night, the Wildcats won their 29th regular season conference title, 16th in the Pac-12, and secured the No. 1 seed in the conference tournament by defeating Stanford 75–67. On March 10, Arizona defeated USC to win a record seventh conference tournament title. As a result, the Wildcats received an automatic bid to their sixth straight NCAA tournament (35th NCAA tournament appearance, 12th all time) as the No. 4 seed in the South regional. The Wildcats, a trendy pick to make the Final Four and win the championship were blown out in the first round by No. 13 seed Buffalo, losing 89–68.

2018–2019 marked the tenth season for Sean Miller as the Arizona Wildcats head coach. Arizona replaced all five starting players, three via the NBA draft. After a victory against UTEP, Miller recorded his 250th win for Arizona (370th win overall), in only 324 games, which was the 5th fastest of any coach at any Division 1 program all-time. On January 5, 2019, Arizona won its 600th game in the McKale center with an 84–81 overtime victory over Utah. Arizona became the first Pac-12 team to achieve 100 wins against conference opponents since the conference expanded to 12 teams before the 2011 season, after defeating Stanford 75−70 Jan. 9, 2019. The Wildcats finished the season in Pac-12 play 8–10, 9th place overall and lose their first round Pac-12 Tournament match up against USC, 78−65. They ended the season with an overall record of 17–15 and decline an invitation to the CBI.

2019–2020 marked the eleventh season for Sean Miller as the Arizona Wildcats head coach. Despite again losing all five starting players, Arizona brought in the 6th overall best recruiting class and ranked pre-season 21st by the AP Poll. Arizona opened the season 9–0, capped off by winning the Wooden Legacy tournament located in Anaheim, California led by tournament MVP Nico Mannion and defeated Wake Forest 73–66. Arizona finished non-conference play ranked 16th with an overall record of 10–3. On February 1, 2020, Miller won his 400th overall game of his career in a 75−70 over USC to move their record to 16–6 and 6–3 in conference play. They defeated Stanford in Maples Pavilion for the conference's longest active streak 20th time, 69–60. Arizona finished the regular season with an overall record of 20–11 and 10–8 in conference play, which was good for 5th. The Wildcats faced 12 seed Washington in their first-round match up and win 77–70, to set up a second-round matchup versus 4 seed USC. The season ended due to the COVID-19 pandemic, which shut down sports globally. Arizona had an overall record 21–11 and were a projected 7 seed, but could have moved higher pending the remainder of the Pac-12 tournament.

In 2020–21, Arizona began its twelfth season under Head Coach Sean Miller. The Pac-12 announced before the season started that schools would not allow fans to attend due to the COVID-19 pandemic. Also due to travel restrictions, financial impact and COVID-19 testing, Arizona was forced to cancel non-conference match ups against pre-season top five teams, Gonzaga and Illinois, as well as cancel their appearance in the 2020 NIT Season Tip-Off in Brooklyn against top 15 ranked Texas Tech, Cincinnati and St. John's. In total, Arizona had 14 games cancelled, postponed or rescheduled, but none of these were due to COVID-19 issues within the Arizona Wildcat program.

This season also marked the introduction of expanded Pac-12 play with each team adding two games, one home and one road, during the months of November and December for a total of 20 with the Wildcats adding games at home against Colorado and on the road against Stanford. Arizona again replaced the entire starting five for a third straight season, but brought in another top 10 recruiting class, 7th overall, led by six international players from Canada, Estonia, France, Lithuania and Turkey, as well as the United States. Arizona finished non-conference play with an overall record of 6–0 against its opponents. Arizona lost its opening Pac-12 game against Stanford 75–78, which snapped the Wildcats' 20-game winning streak against the Cardinal.

Following 88–74 victory over Colorado, the Wildcats announced a Self-Imposed one-year postseason ban, which included the 2021 Pac-12 tournament.

On February 20, Sean Miller won his 300th game at Arizona in only his 408th, 3rd fastest for any coach at any Pac-12 school by defeating the #17 USC Trojans by a score of 81–72. During the halftime of match up against Washington, Arizona inducted former players Ernie McCray (1958–60) and Al Fleming (1972–76) as the 26th and 27th members of the program's Ring of Honor. Arizona ended the season with an overall record of 17–9 overall and finished 5th in the conference at 11–9 but, because of their self-imposed ban, did not participate in the conference tournament. Many bracketologists stated that Arizona would have been an NCAA tournament team if not for the self-imposed ban.

In March 2021, a Notice of Allegations from the NCAA, originally issued in October 2020 at the conclusion of the NCAA's initial investigation, was released to the media by the university after a lawsuit was filed by ESPN; the school received five Level I violations, considered the NCAA's most serious, one specifically against Miller for failing to monitor his assistant coaches accused of academic misconduct and other rules violations. None of the allegations included anything regarding former player Deandre Ayton.

On April 7, 2021, Arizona fired Sean Miller after 12 years. Miller at the time had finished his coaching career with an overall record of 302–109, five regular–season Pac-12 championships, three conference tournament titles and seven NCAA appearances. His 302 wins were the third most in school history. The NCAA along with the IARP vacated 32 wins from the 2016–17 season and 18 wins from the 2017–18 season, for a total of 50 wins. This brought his all-time record to 252–109, and his 252 wins remained the third most in school history.

=== Tommy Lloyd (2021−present) ===
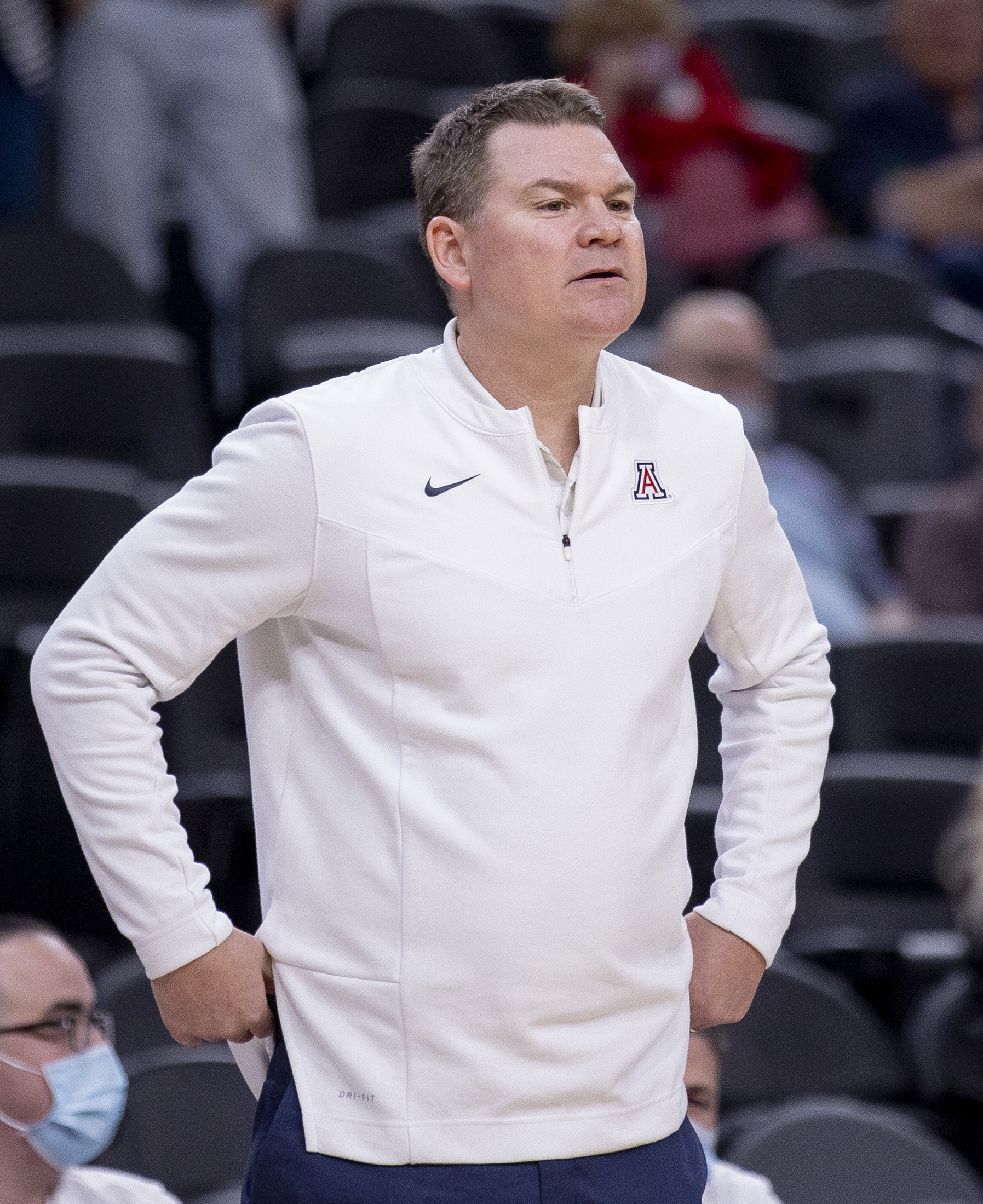
Tommy Lloyd coaching a game at Arizona

After the university decided to part ways with Sean Miller, various coaching names were considered to succeed him on a permanent basis. Three former Wildcats who played under Lute Olson – Damon Stoudamire (head coach at the University of the Pacific), Miles Simon (assistant for the Los Angeles Lakers), and Josh Pastner (head coach at Georgia Tech), as well as Arkansas' Eric Musselman, were under speculation to take the job. On April 14, 2021, it was announced that Tommy Lloyd, the longtime top assistant coach at Gonzaga under Mark Few, became the 18th head coach of Arizona men's basketball. Both Lloyd and Few have been heavily influenced by the European style of basketball (and a focus on recruiting international players), as well as the uptempo, player-focused offense as implemented at Arizona under Lute Olson. A formal press conference was held at McKale Center on April 15 to introduce Lloyd as head coach. Coach Lloyd got his first victory as a head coach versus the Wildcats' in-state rival Northern Arizona 81–52. His 29-point victory versus NAU was the second largest margin in a coach's debut in school history and largest since 1915. He won his first Pac-12 game on December 12, 2021, against Oregon State, 90–65. Coach Lloyd and Arizona lost their first game of his career and season in Knoxville, 77–73 against no. 19 Tennessee.

The Wildcats finished the regular season undefeated on their home court at McKale Center for the 2021–22 campaign, one of only five programs in the nation to do so. The Wildcats were led by sophomore guards Bennedict Mathurin, Kerr Kriisa and Dalen Terry, as well as junior center Christian Koloko and sophomore forward Ąžuolas Tubelis. Coach Lloyd and the Wildcats won their 1st regular season conference title under Lloyd and 17th overall as a program with a 91–71 road win over USC. In the season finale, Arizona defeated California 89–61, becoming the first program and coach to win 18 conference games in the Pac-12 in one season. Arizona clinched the top seed in the 2022 Pac-12 tournament; they went on to defeat No. 9 seed Stanford 84–80, No. 4 seed Colorado 82–72 and No. 2 seed (No. 16 in the AP poll) UCLA 84–76 to win their 8th overall conference tournament title and Coach Tommy Lloyd's 1st. Following the end of the Pac-12 season Lloyd was named Pac-12 Coach of the Year. Arizona finished the Pac-12 portion of the season with a 31–3 record, earning a number 2 ranking in both the AP and coaches' poll. Following the Pac-12 tournament title win, Arizona was selected as the second overall number 1 seed in the South Regional of the 2022 March Madness Tournament, where they played 16 seed Wright State in their first round matchup. Arizona reached its 20th "Sweet 16" by defeating TCU in overtime 85–80. The Wildcats' season ended with a Sweet 16 loss to Houston 72–60. Lloyd was named as a finalists for the Naismith Award. Following the end of the season Coach Lloyd won the AP Coach of the Year, NABC Coach of the Year and USBWA Coach of the Year.

Arizona began the 2022–23 Season by winning the 2022 Maui Invitational Tournament by defeating Cincinnati, No. 17 San Diego State, No. 10 Creighton as well as non-conference games against No. 14 Indiana in the Las Vegas Clash and No. 6 Tennessee in McKale. Arizona and Coach Lloyd ended the non-conference part of the schedule with a record of 12–0. Lloyd became the fastest coach to 50 wins, doing so in 57 games, with a 58–52 win over their rival No. 5 UCLA. It was Arizona's 5th win over a ranked team during the season. Arizona ended the season losing to their rival in Los Angeles, 73–82, giving them an overall record of 25–6 and 14–6 in conference play. They entered postseason play ranked No. 8 overall and the No. 2 in the 2023 Pac-12 Tournament in Las Vegas. Arizona defeated No. 10 seed Stanford Cardinal 95–84, which was his 59th career win, the most of any head coach to start their coaching career. Arizona defeated Arizona State in the semifinals, 78–59. Arizona then defeated rivals UCLA 61–59 to win Arizona's ninth conference tournament title overall, and the second title in a row. Arizona earned a No. 2 seed in the South Region of the 2023 NCAA Tournament, with a first round match up against Ivy League Champion and No. 15 seed Princeton. Arizona was upset 59–55, ending their season with an overall record of 28–7.

Arizona began the 3rd season under Lloyd ranked No. 12 in the preseason AP Poll. They had several non-conference match ups against ranked opponents defeating No. 2 Duke at Cameron Indoor Stadium 78–73, No. 21 Michigan State 74–68, No. 21 Wisconsin 98–73, suffered defeats against No. 3 Purdue 92–84 and No. 14 Florida Atlantic 96–95. The Wildcats entered Pac-12 play with a 9–2 record and were ranked No. 4 in the country, but suffered their first conference loss on the road against unranked Stanford 100–82. Arizona swept the season series against rivals Arizona State and UCLA, finish the regular season with a record of 24–7(15–5) to win their 18th Pac-12 regular season title. Caleb Love won the schools 11th overall Pac-12 Player of the Year and was named second and third team all-American. Arizona lost their semifinal matchup in the Pac-12 tournament against eventual winners Oregon 67–59. Arizona earned a second straight No. 2 seed in the West Region of the 2024 NCAA Tournament, with a first round matchup against Big West Champion and No. 15 seed Long Beach State. Arizona defeated Long Beach 85–66 in the round of 64, and defeated No. 7 Dayton 78–68 to reach their second Sweet Sixteen in three years, but lost to No. 6 Clemson 77–72, ending their season with an overall record of 27–9. Coach Lloyd was one win shy of tying Brad Stevens' record of 89 wins in a head coach's first three years. This also marked Arizona's 50th and final season as members of the Pac-12 Conference, as they would move to the Big 12 Conference to start the 2024–25 season.

Arizona entered the 2025–26 Season preseason ranked No. 13 in the preseason AP Poll. The Wildcats defeated the defending national champion No. 3 Florida Gators in Las Vegas, 93−87. Arizona finished their non-conference schedule 13−0, which included wins against No. 15 UCLA, 69−65 in Los Angeles, No. 3 UConn 71−67 in Storrs and No. 12 Alabama 96−75 in Birmingham. Arizona tied a big 12 record by winning their 22nd straight game of the season, defeating in-state rival Arizona State, 87−74, the win also broke an Arizona record for best start in school history and tied the longest winning streak in school history. Arizona won its first outright Big 12 Conference regular season title after it defeated Iowa State, 73−57, which also gave Lloyd his 140th victory in five seasons, the most of any coach's first five years in NCAA history. Later that season, the team defeated Houston to win its first Big 12 Conference Tournament Championship in school history. Arizona earned the No. 1 seed in the West Region for the 2026 NCAA Tournament, with a first round matchup against Northeast Conference Champion and No. 16 seed LIU. Arizona defeated LIU 92–58, defeated No. 9 Utah State 78–66 to reach their third Sweet Sixteen in four years. Arizona defeated No. 4 Arkansas 109–88, defeated No. 2 Purdue to reach the Wildcats first Final Four in 25 years, fifth Final Four overall and first under Tommy Lloyd. Arizona lost to eventual National Champion No. 1 (MW) seed Michigan 91–73. Arizona set a single season program record 36 wins and an NCAA record 14 wins over AP Top 25 teams. Before their Final Four matchup against Michigan, Arizona announced an extension through the 2031 season for head coach Tommy Lloyd, which included raises for the entire coaching staff, significant incentive bonuses and made head coach Lloyd one of the top five highest paid coaches in college basketball.

== Season-by-season results ==
Under Tommy Lloyd

Record table
Season	Coach	Overall	Conference	Standing	Postseason
2021–22	Arizona	33–4	18–2	1st	NCAA Sweet Sixteen
2022–23	Arizona	28–7	14–6	T–2nd	NCAA First Round
2023–24	Arizona	27–9	15–5	1st	NCAA Sweet Sixteen
2024–25	Arizona	24–13	14–6	T–3rd	NCAA Sweet Sixteen
2025–26	Arizona	36–3	16–2	1st	NCAA Final Four
2026–27	Arizona	4–1	0–0		
Arizona:		152–37 (.804)	77–21 (.786)		
Total:		152–37 (.804)			
National champion Postseason invitational champion Conference regular season champion Conference regular season and conference tournament champion Division regular season champion Division regular season and conference tournament champion Conference tournament champion

== Rivalries ==
=== Arizona State ===
Since Arizona State became a university on December 5, 1958, Arizona leads ASU 84–58. Since both schools joined the Pac-10 conference in the 1978–79 season, Arizona leads ASU 70–30. Since Lute Olson took over as head coach for the 1983–84 season, Arizona leads ASU 67–20. Sean Miller took over for the 2009–2010 season Arizona and finished with a 17–7 record against ASU. Tommy Lloyd is 10–1 all time versus ASU.

The most recent matchup came in Tempe, Arizona on January 31, 2026, with Arizona winning 87–74. The largest margin of victory between the two teams occurred on February 17, 2024, with Arizona winning 105–60. Arizona leads the all-time series with 165–87.

=== UCLA ===
Since then, the two schools competed for the Pac-10 (now Pac-12) Championship every year, with the two teams winning 24 out of the 32 conference titles, and 9 of 18 conference tournament titles. Arizona clinched their first conference title in 1986, when they won on the road at UCLA in Olson's third season. The UCLA-Arizona basketball rivalry is still seen as the match up of the two premier teams in the conference. Also, the performance of the two schools influences the national opinion of the conference. California Coach Mike Montgomery stated, "If those two are not good, the conference is not perceived as being good. People don't give credit to the schools across the board in the league." Since the mid-1980s, Arizona has also had a basketball rivalry with UCLA, as the two schools competed for the Pac-10 Championship every year. Since 1985 the two teams have combined to win 26 out of the 36 conference titles. The UCLA-Arizona basketball rivalry still is seen as the match up of the two premier teams in the conference. Also, the performance of the two schools influences the national opinion of the conference.

The most recent matchup came on November 2, 2026, where UCLA beat Arizona 84–75. The Arizona Wildcats trail the all-time series lead by UCLA with 65–51.

=== Records vs rivals ===
Team	Arizona record	First meeting	Latest result	Home record	Away record	Neutral record	Link
Arizona State (in-state)	165–87 (.655)	Dec 13, 1913 (Arizona 41–17)	Jan 31, 2026 (Arizona 87–74)	94–31 (.752)	69–55 (.556)	2–1 (.667)	Arizona–Arizona State
UCLA	51–65 (.440)	Feb 19, 1923 (UCLA 43–30)	November 12, 2026 (UCLA 84–75)	28–18 (.609)	15–38 (.283)	8–9 (.471)	Arizona–UCLA
Total	216–152 (.587)	1913	Present	122–49 (.713)	84–93 (.475)	10–10 (.500)	N/A

== Notable players and coaches ==
The Wildcats have had 18 coaches in their 116-year history. To date, one Wildcats coach has won the National Coach of the Year award: Lute Olson twice, in 1988 and 1990. Additionally, three Wildcats coaches have been named Pac-12 Conference Coach of the Year: Lute Olson in 1986, 1988, 1989, 1993, 1994, 1998 and 2003, Sean Miller in 2011, 2014, and 2017, and Tommy Lloyd in 2022.

=== Wildcats inducted into the Naismith Memorial Basketball Hall of Fame ===
Coaches

- Lute Olson (2002)

=== Wildcats in the Olympics ===
Seven Arizona Wildcats men's basketball players have represented four different countries eight total times in basketball (Budinger was an Olympian in volleyball) in the Summer Olympics:

Year	Player	Country	Location	Medal or placement
1984	Leon Wood	United States	Los Angeles	Gold
2004	Richard Jefferson	United States	Athens	Bronze
2012	Andre Iguodala	United States	London	Gold
2020	Nico Mannion	Italy	Tokyo	5th place
2020	Josh Green	Australia	Tokyo	Bronze
2024	Josh Green	Australia	Paris	7th place
2024	Chase Budinger	United States	Paris	T-9th place (beach volleyball)
U of A Olympians

=== Current players in the NBA/NBA G-League ===
Name	NBA team	Seasons as Wildcat	Post-Wildcat accomplishment
Aaron Gordon	Denver Nuggets	2013–14	2023: NBA Champion; 2016, 2017, 2020: NBA Slam Dunk Contest participant; 2015: Orlando Pro Summer League MVP
T. J. McConnell	Indiana Pacers	2013–15	2025: NBA Finals appearance
Lauri Markkanen	Utah Jazz	2016–17	2023: NBA All-Star; 2023: NBA Most Improved Player; 2018, 2019: Rising Stars Challenge (Champion 2018); 2018: NBA All-Rookie First Team
Deandre Ayton	Washington Wizards	2017–18	2025: NBA Community Assist Award; 2021: NBA Finals appearance; 2019: NBA All-Rookie First Team; 2019: Rising Stars Challenge
Brandon Williams	Golden State Warriors	2018–19	2024: NBA G League Player of the Week (December 3–9); 2024: NBA Finals appearance
Josh Green	Utah Jazz	2019–20	2024: NBA Finals appearance; 2024: Summer Olympics participant (Australia); 2020: Summer Olympics bronze medal (Australia)
Zeke Nnaji	Denver Nuggets	2019–20	2023: NBA Champion
Christian Koloko	New Orleans Pelicans	2019–22	
Bennedict Mathurin	New Orleans Pelicans	2020–22	2025: Medal of the National Assembly of Quebec; 2025: NBA Finals appearance; 2023, 2024: Rising Stars Challenge Champion (MVP in 2024); 2023: NBA All-Rookie First Team; 2022: NBA Eastern Conference Rookie of the Month (November)
Dalen Terry	Oklahoma City Thunder	2020–22	
Keshad Johnson	Miami Heat	2023–24	2026: NBA Slam Dunk Contest Champion
Pelle Larsson	Miami Heat	2021–24	
Carter Bryant	San Antonio Spurs	2024–25	2026: NBA Finals appearance; 2026: NBA Slam Dunk Contest participant; 2026: Rising Stars Challenge Champion
Caleb Love	Philadelphia 76ers	2023–25	
Brayden Burries	Milwaukee Bucks	2025–26	
Koa Peat	Phoenix Suns	2025–26	
Jaden Bradley	Toronto Raptors	2023–26	
Tobe Awaka	Chicago Bulls	2023–26	

Name	NBA G League team	Seasons as Wildcat	Contract status
Christian Koloko	College Park Skyhawks	2019–22	Two-way contract
Dalen Terry	Oklahoma City Blue	2020–22	
Keshad Johnson	Free agent	2023–24	Sioux Falls Skyforce
Caleb Love	Delaware Blue Coats	2023–25	Two-way contract
Tobe Awaka	Windy City Bulls	2023–26	Two-way contract

=== Current NBA/NBA G League coaches ===
- Steve Kerr, head coach, Golden State Warriors
- Joseph Blair, head coach, Rio Grande Valley Vipers
- Quinton Crawford, assistant coach, Portland Trail Blazers
- Matt Brase, assistant coach, Philadelphia 76ers
- Bret Brielmaier, assistant coach, New Orleans Pelicans
- Bruce Fraser, assistant coach, Golden State Warriors
- Jason Terry, assistant coach, Utah Jazz
- Luke Walton, assistant coach, Detroit Pistons

=== NCAA ===
- Mike Bibby, head coach, Sacramento State
- Josh Pastner, head coach, UNLV
- Damon Stoudamire, assistant coach, LSU

==== NBA draft history ====
14 different NBA championships have been won by 15 Wildcats players. Since the NBA draft was shortened to two rounds in 1989, 50 Arizona players have been selected. Former Wildcats have had successful NBA careers, totaling over $2.1 billion in total contracts through the 2025–2026 NBA season. Former Wildcat players have been drafted by every current NBA franchise except the New Orleans Pelicans and the Utah Jazz.

Name	Round	Overall pick	Year	Team
Morris Udall	—N/a	—N/a	1948	Denver Nuggets (NBL)
Lincoln Richmond	—N/a	—N/a	1948	Fort Wayne Pistons
Leon Blevins	7	79	1950	Indianapolis Olympians
Leo Johnson	5	44	1951	Ft. Wayne Pistons
Roger Johnson	—N/a	—N/a	1952	Milwaukee Hawks
Ernie McCray	17	95	1960	Cincinnati Royals
Warren Rustand	4	31	1965	San Francisco Warriors
Bill Davis	12	160	1968	Phoenix Suns
Michael Foster	—N/a	—N/a	1970	Indiana Pacers (ABA)
Tom Lee	9	147	1971	Philadelphia 76ers
Eddie Myers	10	160	1971	Baltimore Bullets (ABA)
Bill Warner	11	170	1971	Buffalo Braves (ABA)
Bruce Anderson	7	101	1972	Detroit Pistons
Eric Money	2	33	1974	Detroit Pistons (ABA)
Coniel Norman	3	37	1974	Philadelphia 76ers (ABA)
Al Fleming	2	30	1976	Phoenix Suns
James Rappis	5	77	1976	Milwaukee Bucks
Bob Elliott	2	42	1977	Philadelphia 76ers
Herman Harris	2	43	1977	Philadelphia 76ers
Jerome Gladney	8	164	1977	San Antonio Spurs
Phil Taylor	10	198	1978	Denver Nuggets
Larry Demic	1	9	1979	New York Knicks
Joe Nehls	7	152	1980	Houston Rockets
Ron Davis	4	79	1981	Washington Bullets
Robbie Dosty	6	148	1981	Golden State Warriors
Frank Smith	8	177	1983	Portland Trail Blazers
Pete Williams	4	89	1985	Denver Nuggets
Eddie Smith	7	158	1985	Denver Nuggets
Tom Tolbert	2	34	1988	Charlotte Hornets
Steve Kerr	2	50	1988	Phoenix Suns
Sean Elliott	1	3	1989	San Antonio Spurs
Anthony Cook	1	24	1989	Phoenix Suns
Jud Buechler	2	38	1990	Seattle SuperSonics
Brian Williams	1	10	1991	Orlando Magic
Sean Rooks	2	30	1992	Dallas Mavericks
Chris Mills	1	22	1993	Cleveland Cavaliers
Ed Stokes	2	35	1993	Miami Heat
Khalid Reeves	1	12	1994	Miami Heat
Damon Stoudamire	1	7	1995	Toronto Raptors
Joseph Blair	2	35	1996	Seattle SuperSonics
Ben Davis	2	43	1996	Phoenix Suns
Reggie Geary	2	56	1996	Cleveland Cavaliers
Mike Bibby	1	2	1998	Vancouver Grizzlies
Michael Dickerson	1	14	1998	Houston Rockets
Miles Simon	2	42	1998	Orlando Magic
Jason Terry	1	10	1999	Atlanta Hawks
A. J. Bramlett	2	39	1999	Cleveland Cavaliers
Richard Jefferson	1	13	2001	Houston Rockets
Gilbert Arenas	2	31	2001	Golden State Warriors
Michael Wright	2	39	2001	New York Knicks
Loren Woods	2	46	2001	Minnesota Timberwolves
Luke Walton	2	32	2003	Los Angeles Lakers
Andre Iguodala	1	9	2004	Philadelphia 76ers
Channing Frye	1	8	2005	New York Knicks
Salim Stoudamire	2	31	2005	Atlanta Hawks
Hassan Adams	2	54	2006	New Jersey Nets
Marcus Williams	2	33	2007	San Antonio Spurs
Jerryd Bayless	1	11	2008	Indiana Pacers
Jordan Hill	1	8	2009	New York Knicks
Chase Budinger	2	44	2009	Detroit Pistons
Derrick Williams	1	2	2011	Minnesota Timberwolves
Solomon Hill	1	23	2013	Indiana Pacers
Grant Jerrett	2	40	2013	Portland Trail Blazers
Aaron Gordon	1	4	2014	Orlando Magic
Nick Johnson	2	42	2014	Houston Rockets
Stanley Johnson	1	8	2015	Detroit Pistons
Rondae Hollis-Jefferson	1	23	2015	Portland Trail Blazers
Lauri Markkanen	1	7	2017	Minnesota Timberwolves
Kadeem Allen	2	53	2017	Boston Celtics
Deandre Ayton	1	1	2018	Phoenix Suns
Josh Green	1	18	2020	Dallas Mavericks
Zeke Nnaji	1	22	2020	Denver Nuggets
Nico Mannion	2	48	2020	Golden State Warriors
Bennedict Mathurin	1	6	2022	Indiana Pacers
Dalen Terry	1	18	2022	Chicago Bulls
Christian Koloko	2	33	2022	Toronto Raptors
Pelle Larsson	2	44	2024	Houston Rockets
Carter Bryant	1	14	2025	San Antonio Spurs
Brayden Burries	1	10	2026	Milwaukee Bucks
Koa Peat	1	30	2026	Dallas Mavericks
Jaden Bradley	2	50	2026	Toronto Raptors

Source: Arizona 2026–27 Media Guide

==== Wildcats with NBA championships ====
A total of 33 NBA championships have been won by 15 former Wildcats, consisting of 15 different finals years (1996, 1997, 1998, 1999, 2003, 2009, 2010, 2011, 2015, 2016, 2017, 2018, 2020, 2022 and 2023). Seven of the last tn championship teams have had a former Wildcat as a player and/or coaching staff member on the team.

Former Wildcats have played in 24 of the last 31 finals, including 12 straight (since 2015) and have coached in seven of the last 12 finals.

Player (college years)	Finals year	Team
Andre Iguodala (2002–04)	2015, 2016 2017, 2018, 2019, 2020, 2022	Golden State Warriors (4), Miami Heat
Steve Kerr (1983–88)	1996, 1997, 1998, 1999, 2003	Chicago Bulls (3), San Antonio Spurs (2)
Richard Jefferson (1998–01)	2002, 2003, 2016, 2017	New Jersey Nets, Cleveland Cavaliers
Luke Walton (1999–03)	2004, 2008, 2009, 2010	Los Angeles Lakers (2)
Jud Buechler (1986–90)	1996, 1997, 1998	Chicago Bulls (3)
Channing Frye (2001–05)	2016, 2017	Cleveland Cavaliers
Jason Terry (1995–99)	2006, 2011	Dallas Mavericks
Deandre Ayton (2017–18)	2021	Phoenix Suns
Mike Bibby (1996–98)	2011	Miami Heat
Carter Bryant (2024–25)	2026	San Antonio Spurs
Ben Davis (1994–96)	1999	New York Knicks
Bison Dele (1988–91)	1997	Chicago Bulls
Sean Elliott (1984–89)	1999	San Antonio Spurs
Al Fleming (1972–76)	1978	Seattle SuperSonics
Aaron Gordon (2013–14)	2023	Denver Nuggets
Solomon Hill (2009–13)	2020	Miami Heat
Josh Green (2019–20)	2024	Dallas Mavericks
Bennedict Mathurin (2020–22)	2025	Indiana Pacers
T. J. McConnell (2013–15)	2025	Indiana Pacers
Zeke Nnaji (2019–20)	2023	Denver Nuggets
Brandon Williams (2018–19)	2024	Dallas Mavericks
Derrick Williams (2009–11)	2017	Cleveland Cavaliers

Player (college years)	Finals year	Team
Steve Kerr (1983–88)	2015, 2016, 2017, 2018, 2019, 2022	Golden State Warriors (4)
Bruce Fraser (1984–87)	2015, 2016, 2017, 2018, 2019, 2022	Golden State Warriors (4)
Luke Walton (1999–03)	2015, 2016	Golden State Warriors
Bret Brielmaier (2004–08)	2016	Cleveland Cavaliers
Quinton Crawford (2011–13)	2020	Los Angeles Lakers
Miles Simon (1994–98)	2020	Los Angeles Lakers

Honors, awards, and accomplishments

The individual honors, awards, and accomplishments listed in the succeeding subsections are aggregated by player in the following table. Players with only all-conference honors (other than conference player of the year), lower than first-team All-America honors, or later than second-round draft positions are not included.

Name	Seasons as Wildcat	Post-Wildcat accomplishment
Deandre Ayton	2017–18	First Wildcat selected 1st Overall, 2019 & 2020 Rising Stars Challenge, NBA All-Rookie First Team, 9 NBA seasons
Gilbert Arenas	1999–01	2003 Rookie Challenge, 3-time NBA All-Star, NBA Most Improved Player Award, 2-time NBA 3 Point Contest participant (2006 & 2007), 11 NBA seasons
Mike Bibby	1996–98	2000 Rookie Challenge, NBA All-Rookie First Team, 2-time NBA 3 Point Contest participant (2000 & 2009), 14 NBA seasons
Jud Buechler	1986–90	3-time NBA champion, 11 NBA seasons
Bison Dele (Brian Williams)	1989–90	NBA champion, 7 NBA seasons
Sean Elliott	1985–89	2-time NBA All-Star, NBA champion, 12 NBA seasons
Channing Frye	2001–05	NBA champion, 2006 Rookie Challenge, NBA All-Rookie First Team, 1-time NBA 3 Point Contest participant (2010), 15 NBA seasons
Aaron Gordon	2013–14	3x NBA Dunk Contest participant (2016, 2017 & 2020), NBA champion, 13 NBA seasons
Josh Green	2019–20	2x Australian Olympian – 2020 Summer Olympics, 2024 Summer Olympics – bronze medal (2020), 7 NBA seasons
Andre Iguodala	2002–04	4x NBA champion, NBA Finals MVP, 2005 & 2006 Rookie Challenge, 2012 NBA All-Star, NBA All-Defensive First Team, NBA All-Defensive Second Team, NBA All-Rookie First Team, NBA Rookie Challenge MVP, United States – 2012 Summer Olympics – gold medal, 19 NBA seasons
Richard Jefferson	1998–01	NBA champion, 2003 Rookie Challenge, NBA All-Rookie Second Team, United States – 2004 Summer Olympics – bronze medal, 18 NBA seasons
Steve Kerr	1983–88	5x NBA champion as Player, 4x NBA champion as Coach, 4-time NBA 3 Point Contest participant and 1-time winner (1997), 2016 NBA Coach of the Year, NBA All-Star Game Head Coach (2015 and 2017), All-time leader in 3 Point FG %, Most Single Season Wins by a Coach (73 Wins), 3rd All-time leader in Coaching Post Season Win % (.684), Highest Single Post Season Win % (.933), 6th All-time leader in Coaching Post Season Wins (104), T-3rd All-time leader in Coaching Post Season Conference Title Games (6), 6th All-time leader in Coaching NBA Finals Wins (4), head coach of Team USA Basketball
Kenny Lofton	1985–89	6-time MLB All Star, 4-time Gold Glove Award, 17 MLB seasons
Lauri Markkanen	2016–17	NBA All-Rookie 1st Team (2018), 2018 & 2019 Rising Stars Challenge, NBA All-Star (2023), NBA Most Improved Player Award (2023), 1-time NBA 3 Point Contest participant (2023), 10 NBA seasons
Bennedict Mathurin	2020–22	2023 Rising Stars Challenge, NBA All-Rookie 1st Team (2023), 5 NBA seasons
Chris Mills	1989–93	1994 Rookie Challenge, 10 NBA seasons
Eric Money	1972–74	456. Slam the 500 Greatest NBA Players of All-Time, 6 NBA seasons
Khalid Reeves	1990–94	1995 Rookie Challenge, 6 NBA seasons
Damon Stoudamire	1991–95	1996 Rookie Challenge, NBA Rookie of the Year Award, NBA All-Rookie First Team, 13 NBA seasons
Jason Terry	1995–99	2001 Rookie Challenge, NBA champion, NBA Sixth Man of the Year Award, NBA All-Rookie Second Team, 18 NBA seasons – All-time leading scorer of Arizona players in NBA, 7th most made 3pt Field Goals all time, 10th in Games played
Mo Udall	1941–42, 46–48	Former member of U.S. Congress (30 years)
Derrick Williams	2009–2011	2012 Rookie Challenge, 7 NBA seasons
Leon Wood	1979–80	United States – 1984 Summer Olympics – gold medal, 7 NBA seasons

Source: Arizona 2025–26 Media Guide

== National honors and awards (players) ==
Player	Award	Season
Sean Elliott	John R. Wooden Award	1989
Sean Elliott	Naismith Player of the Year	1989
Mike Bibby	Naismith Player of the Year	1997
Jason Terry	Naismith Player of the Year	1997
Jason Gardner	Wayman Tisdale Award	2000

Player	Award	Season
Miles Simon	NCAA Final Four Most Outstanding Player	1997
Loren Woods	Frank Hessler Award	2000
Stanley Johnson	Julius Erving Award	2015
Deandre Ayton	Karl Malone Award	2018

Conference honors and awards (players)

Award	Player	Year awarded
Pac-12 Player of the Year	Sean Elliott	1988
Pac-12 Player of the Year	Sean Elliott (2)	1989
Pac-12 Player of the Year	Chris Mills	1993
Pac-12 Player of the Year	Damon Stoudamire	1995
Pac-12 Player of the Year	Mike Bibby	1998
Pac-12 Player of the Year	Jason Terry	1999
Pac-12 Player of the Year	Derrick Williams	2011
Pac-12 Player of the Year	Nick Johnson	2014
Pac-12 Player of the Year	Deandre Ayton	2018
Pac-12 Player of the Year	Bennedict Mathurin	2022
Pac-12 Player of the Year	Caleb Love	2024
Big 12 Player of the Year	Jaden Bradley	2026

Award	Player	Year awarded
Pac-12 Freshman of the Year	Sean Elliott	1986
Pac-12 Freshman of the Year	Mike Bibby	1997
Pac-12 Freshman of the Year	Michael Wright	1999
Pac-12 Freshman of the Year	Salim Stoudamire	2002
Pac-12 Freshman of the Year	Chase Budinger	2007
Pac-12 Freshman of the Year	Derrick Williams	2010
Pac-12 Freshman of the Year	Aaron Gordon	2014
Pac-12 Freshman of the Year	Stanley Johnson	2015
Pac-12 Freshman of the Year	Deandre Ayton	2018
Pac-12 Freshman of the Year	Zeke Nnaji	2020

Award	Player	Year awarded
Pac-12 Defensive Player of the Year	Christian Koloko	2022
Pac-12 Most Improved Player of the Year	Christian Koloko	2022
Pac-12 Most Improved Player of the Year	Oumar Ballo	2023
Pac-12 Sixth Man of the Year	Jordan Brown	2021
Pac-12 Sixth Man of the Year	Pelle Larsson	2022
Big 12 Sixth Man of the Year	Tobe Awaka	2026
Pac-12 Scholar Athlete of the Year	Stone Gettings	2020

Award	Player	Year awarded
Pac-12 Tournament; Most Outstanding Player	Sean Elliott	1988
Pac-12 Tournament; Most Outstanding Player	Sean Elliott (2)	1989
Pac-12 Tournament; Most Outstanding Player	Jud Buechler & Matt Muehlebach	1990
Pac-12 Tournament; Most Outstanding Player	Luke Walton	2002
Pac-12 Tournament; Most Outstanding Player	Salim Stoudamire	2005
Pac-12 Tournament; Most Outstanding Player	Brandon Ashley	2015
Pac-12 Tournament; Most Outstanding Player	Allonzo Trier	2017
Pac-12 Tournament; Most Outstanding Player	Deandre Ayton	2018
Pac-12 Tournament; Most Outstanding Player	Bennedict Mathurin	2022
Pac-12 Tournament; Most Outstanding Player	Ąžuolas Tubelis	2023
Big 12 Tournament MVP	Jaden Bradley	2026

=== All-Americans ===
Arizona has had 33 All-American All-Americans selections. Arizona has had seven players selected as Consensus First Team All-Americans eight times. They have also had six players selected as Consensus Second Team All-Americans. 14 Arizona players have received an AP All-America honorable mention.

Player	Consensus First Team year
Sean Elliott	1988
Sean Elliott (2)	1989
Damon Stoudamire	1995
Mike Bibby	1998
Miles Simon	1998
Jason Terry	1998
Nick Johnson	2014
Deandre Ayton	2018

Player	Consensus Second Team year
Khalid Reeves	1994
Jason Gardner	2003
Salim Stoudamire	2005
Derrick Williams	2011
Bennedict Mathurin	2022
Ąžuolas Tubelis	2023

Player	Other NCAA recognized All-Americans
Roger Johnson	Helms Foundation 3rd Team (1951)
Bob Elliott	Basketball Weekly & Helms Foundation/Citizen's Savings 3rd Team (1976)
Bob Elliott (2)	Basketball Weekly & Helms Foundation/Citizen's Savings 1st Team (1977)
Steve Kerr	AP 2nd Team & NABC 3rd Team (1988)
Chris Mills	Basketball Weekly 2nd Team & AP, Basketball Times, NABC & UPI 3rd Team (1993)
Michael Dickerson	AP 3rd Team (1998)
Jason Gardner	Basketball Times 3rd Team (2000)
Michael Wright	AP & ESPN 3rd Team (2001)
Gilbert Arenas	ESPN 3rd Team & AP Honorable Mention (2001)
Jason Gardner	Basketball America 2nd Team & AP, NABC 3rd Team (2002)
Luke Walton	John Wooden 1st Team; SN, Basketball News 2nd Team; Basketball Times 3rd Team (2002)
Channing Frye	Basketball Times 2nd Team (2005)
Jerryd Bayless	SI 2nd Team & ESPN 3rd Team (2008)
Jordan Hill	SN 3rd Team & AP Honorable Mention (2009)
Aaron Gordon	SN 3rd Team (2014)
Stanley Johnson	SN 3rd Team (2015)
Lauri Markkanen	AP, NABC, SN & USAT 3rd Team (2017)
Caleb Love	USBWA & NABC 2nd team, AP & SN 3rd Team (2024)
Jaden Bradley	NABC, SN, USBWA 3rd Team & AP Honorable Mention (2026)

Player	Honorable Mention All-Americans
Chris Mills	AP Honorable Mention (1991)
Brian Williams	AP Honorable Mention (1991)
Chris Mills (2)	AP Honorable Mention (1992)
Sean Rooks	AP Honorable Mention (1992)
Damon Stoudamire	AP, Basketball Weekly & USBWA Honorable Mention (1994)
Michael Dickerson	AP Honorable Mention (1997)
Loren Woods	AP Honorable Mention (2000)
Michael Wright	AP Honorable Mention (2000)
Jason Gardner	AP Honorable Mention (2001)
Loren Woods (2)	AP Honorable Mention (2001)
Luke Walton	AP Honorable Mention (2003)
Andre Iguodala	AP Honorable Mention (2004)
Chase Budinger	AP Honorable Mention (2009)
Allonzo Trier	AP Honorable Mention (2018)
Brayden Burries	AP Honorable Mention (2026)

==== McDonald's All-Americans ====
The following 33 McDonald's All-Americans listed below have signed with Arizona. An asterisk, "*", indicates player did not finish his college career at Arizona. A cross, "†", indicates player did not begin his college career at Arizona.

Player	McDonald's All-American year
Craig McMillan	1984
Sean Elliott	1985
Brian Williams	1987
Chris Mills†	1988
Khalid Reeves	1990
Ben Davis†	1991
Mike Bibby	1996
Loren Woods†	1996
Richard Jefferson	1998
Jason Gardner	1999
Hassan Adams	2002
Mustafa Shakur	2003
Jawann McClellan	2004
Chase Budinger	2006
Jerryd Bayless	2007
Brandon Ashley; Grant Jerrett	2012

Player	McDonald's All-American year
Rondae Hollis-Jefferson; Aaron Gordon	2013
Stanley Johnson	2014
Chase Jeter†; Allonzo Trier	2015
Kobi Simmons	2016
Deandre Ayton	2017
Jordan Brown†	2018
Josh Green; Nico Mannion	2019
Caleb Love†	2020
Jaden Bradley†	2022
Carter Bryant	2024
Koa Peat; Brayden Burries	2025
Caleb Holt	2026

=== All-Conference (Pac-12 & Big 12) honors ===
While members of the Pac-12, Arizona had 86 All-Conference selections, which was sixth most among Pac-12 schools. They have had 91 All-Conference selections. The following is a list of Arizona Wildcats men's basketball players who were named first, second or third team All Pac-12 or Big 12:

Player	First team All-Pac-12/Big 12
Larry Demic	1979
Joe Nehls (2)	1980
Ron Davis	1981
Pete Williams	1984
Pete Williams	1985
Eddie Smith	1985
Steve Kerr	1986
Sean Elliott	1987
Sean Elliott (2)‡	1988
Steve Kerr (2)	1988
Anthony Cook	1988
Sean Elliott (3)‡	1989
Anthony Cook (2)	1989
Jud Buechler	1990
Brian Williams	1991
Chris Mills	1992
Sean Rooks	1992
Damon Stoudamire	1993
Chris Mills (2)‡	1993
Khalid Reeves	1994
Damon Stoudamire (2)	1994
Ray Owes	1995
Damon Stoudamire (3)‡	1995
Ben Davis	1996
Reggie Geary	1996
Michael Dickerson	1997

Player	First team All-Pac-12/Big 12
Mike Bibby‡	1998
Michael Dickerson (2)	1998
Miles Simon	1998
A.J. Bramlett	1999
Jason Terry‡	1999
Michael Wright	1999
Jason Gardner	2000
Michael Wright (2)	2000
Loren Woods	2000
Gilbert Arenas	2001
Michael Wright (3)	2001
Jason Gardner (2)	2002
Luke Walton	2002
Jason Gardner (3)	2003
Luke Walton (2)	2003
Channing Frye	2004
Andre Iguodala	2004
Channing Frye (2)	2005
Salim Stoudamire	2005
Hassan Adams	2006
Marcus Williams	2007
Chase Budinger (2)	2009
Jordan Hill	2009
Nic Wise (2)	2010
Derrick Williams†	2010
Derrick Williams (2)‡	2011

Player	First team All-Pac-12/Big 12
Kyle Fogg	2012
Solomon Hill	2012
Solomon Hill (2)	2013
Mark Lyons	2013
Aaron Gordon	2014
Nick Johnson‡	2014
Rondae Hollis-Jefferson	2015
Stanley Johnson	2015
T. J. McConnell	2015
Ryan Anderson	2016
Lauri Markkanen	2017
Deandre Ayton‡†	2018
Allonzo Trier	2018
Zeke Nnaji†	2020
James Akinjo	2021
Christian Koloko∞	2022
Bennedict Mathurin‡	2022
Ąžuolas Tubelis	2022
Oumar Ballo	2023
Ąžuolas Tubelis (2)	2023
Oumar Ballo (2)	2024
Caleb Love‡	2024
Caleb Love (2)	2025
Jaden Bradley‡	2026
Brayden Burries	2026
Motiejus Krivas	2026

Note

- ‡ indicates player was Pac-12/Big 12 Player of the Year
- † indicates player was Pac-12/Big 12 Freshman of the Year
- ∞ indicates player was Pac-12/Big 12 Defensive Player of the Year

Player	Second team All-Pac-12/Big 12
Joe Nehls	1979
Jerryd Bayless	2008
Nic Wise	2009
T. J. McConnell	2014
Kaleb Tarczewski	2016
Gabe York	2016
Allonzo Trier	2017
Kadeem Allen	2017
Dusan Ristic	2018
Nico Mannion	2020
Pelle Larsson	2024

Player	Third team All-Pac-12/Big 12
Chase Budinger	2008
Koa Peat	2026

Note: Second team was only awarded from the '77–79' and starting again in the 2007 season.

All-Conference (Pac-12 & Big 12) freshman honors

While members of the Pac-12 Arizona had 33 All-Freshman selections (*One selection vacated due to NCAA penalty, revised total is 32), which was 2nd most among Pac-12 schools. The following is a list of Arizona Wildcats men's basketball players who were named All Conference Freshman team:

Player	Pac-12/Big 12 All Freshman Team
Brock Brunkhorst	1982
Michael Tait	1984
Sean Elliott‡	1986
Sean Rooks	1989
Matt Othick	1989
Ed Stokes	1990
Khalid Reeves	1991
Damon Stoudamire	1992
Mike Bibby‡	1997
Richard Jefferson	1999
Michael Wright‡	1999
Gilbert Arenas	2000
Jason Gardner	2000
Channing Frye	2002
Salim Stoudamire‡	2002
Hassan Adams	2003
Andre Iguodala	2003
Mustafa Shakur	2004

Player	Pac-12/Big 12 All Freshman Team
Marcus Williams	2006
Chase Budinger‡	2007
Jerryd Bayless	2008
Derrick Williams‡	2010
Nick Johnson	2012
Aaron Gordon‡	2014
Rondae Hollis-Jefferson	2014
Stanley Johnson‡	2015
Allonzo Trier	2016
Lauri Markkanen	2017
Rawle Alkins	2017
Deandre Ayton‡	2018
Nico Mannion	2020
Zeke Nnaji‡	2020
Bennedict Mathurin	2021
Ąžuolas Tubelis	2021
Brayden Burries	2026
Koa Peat	2026

Note

- ‡ indicates player was Pac-12/Big 12 Freshman of the Year.

==== All-Conference (Pac-12 & Big 12) defense and newcomer ====
While members of the Pac-12 Arizona had 11 All-Defense selections, which was the second most among Pac-12 schools. Arizona has also had three Newcomer selections, which was tied for 8th among the Pac-12. The following is a list of Arizona Wildcats men's basketball players who were named All Conference Defense or Newcomer:

Player	Pac-12/Big 12 All-Defensive Team
Jordan Hill	2009
Kyle Fogg	2012
Nick Johnson	2014
T. J. McConnell	2014
Rondae Hollis-Jefferson	2015
T. J. McConnell (2)	2015
Kaleb Tarczewski	2016
Kadeem Allen	2017
Deandre Ayton	2018
Dalen Terry	2022
Christian Koloko‡	2022
Jaden Bradley	2026
Montiejus Krivas	2026

Note

- ‡ indicates player was Pac-12/Big 12 Defensive Player of the Year

Player	Pac-12/Big 12 All Newcomer
Ben Davis Jr.	1995
Bennett Davison Jr.	1997
Loren Woods‡	2000

- ‡ indicates player was Pac-12/Big 12 Newcomer of the Year

==== All-Academic Team (Pac-12 & Big 12) ====
While members of the Pac-12 Arizona had 14 All-Academic, which was eighth most among Pac-12 schools. The following is a list of Arizona Wildcats men's basketball players who were named All Conference Academic team:

Player	Pac-12/Big12 All-Academic Team
Steve Kerr	1986
Steve Kerr (2)	1988
Matt Muehlebach	1989
Matt Muehlebach (2)	1990
Matt Muehlebach (3)	1991
Kevin Flanagan	1994
Eugene Edgerson	2001
Jason Ranne‡	2004
Andre Iguodala^	2004
Brett Brielmaier‡	2004
Chase Jeter‡	2019
Stone Gettings‡	2020
Jordan Mains	2022
Pelle Larsson	2024
Tobe Awaka	2026

Notes

- ‡ indicates player was Pac-12/Big 12 All-Academic First Team selection
- ^ indicates player was Pac-12/Big 12 All-Academic Second Team

==== National achievements, awards and honors ====
Player/Coach	Award	Season
Lute Olson	Naismith Memorial Basketball Hall of Fame	2002
Lute Olson	National Collegiate Basketball Hall of Fame	2006 & 2019
Sean Elliott	National Collegiate Basketball Hall of Fame	2018

Coach	Award	Season
Lute Olson	National Coach of the Year	1988 & 1990
Lute Olson	John R. Wooden Legends of Coaching Award	2002
Lute Olson	Clair Bee Coach of the Year Award	2001
Tommy Lloyd	AP Coach of the Year	2022
Tommy Lloyd	NABC Coach of the Year	2022
Tommy Lloyd	USBWA Coach of the Year	2022
Tommy Lloyd	Sporting News Coach of the Year	2026
Tommy Lloyd	Naismith Coach of the Year	2026

Coach	Award	Season
WAC Coach of the Year	Fred Snowden	1972
Pac-12 Coach of the Year	Lute Olson	1986, 1988, 1989, 1993, 1994, 1998 & 2003
Pac-12 Coach of the Year	Sean Miller	2011, 2014, 2017
Pac-12 Coach of the Year	Tommy Lloyd	2022
Big 12 Coach of the Year	Tommy Lloyd	2026

==== Arizona's Ring of Honor ====
A total of 37 Wildcats have or will earn entry into McKale Center's Ring of Honor, the display of names that begins in the southeast corner of the building's rafters. In order to join this elite group, players must meet at least one of the following six criteria:

- First-team All-America recognition by one or more of the major national organizations or media
- Major national "player of distinction," i.e. the Wooden Award or other honor of significance
- Pac-12 Player of the Year or Pac-12 Freshman of the Year
- Arizona career leader in three or more major positive career categories at the conclusion of his collegiate career and must hold the career record for a minimum of five years (excluding single-game records)
- 10+ years in the United States Major Professional Leagues of the NFL, NBA, WNBA and MLB and/or been selected as an All-Star/All Pro by the official league
- Olympic medalist

Player	Years played	Position	Criteria
Bob Elliott	1974–77	C	1, 4
Steve Kerr	1984–88	G	2, 5
Sean Elliott	1986–89	G/F	1, 2, 3, 4, 5
Jud Buechler	1987–90	F	5
Sean Rooks	1989–92	C	5
Chris Mills	1991–93	G/F	1, 3, 5
Khalid Reeves	1991–94	G	4
Damon Stoudamire	1992–95	G	1, 3, 5
Miles Simon	1995–98	G	1, 2
Jason Terry	1996–99	G	1, 2, 3, 5
Mike Bibby	1996–98	G	1, 2, 3, 5
Michael Wright	1999–01	F	3
Richard Jefferson	1999–01	F	5, 6
Jason Gardner	1999–03	G	2
Luke Walton	2000–03	PF	1, 5
Salim Stoudamire	2002–05	G	3
Gilbert Arenas	2000–01	G	5
Chase Budinger	2007–09	F	3
Channing Frye	2002–05	C	5

Player	Years played	Position	Criteria
Derrick Williams	2010–11	F	3
Andre Iguodala	2003–04	F	5, 6
Aaron Gordon	2014	F	3, 5
Nick Johnson	2012–14	G	1, 3
Stanley Johnson	2015	G	2, 3
Jerryd Bayless	2008	G	5
Deandre Ayton	2018	F	1, 2, 3
Al Fleming	1972–76	F	4
Ernie McCray	1957–60	F	4
Zeke Nnaji	2020	F	3
Josh Green	2020	G	6
Bennedict Mathurin	2020–22	G	3
Christian Koloko	2019–22	C	3
Kenny Lofton	1985–89	G	5
T. J. McConnell	2013–15	G	5
Caleb Love	2023–25	G	3
Lauri Markkanen	2016–17	F	5
Jaden Bradley	2023–26	G	3

=== Retired numbers ===
To have his number retired, a player must win one of the following six widely recognized player of the year awards:
- Associated Press Player of the Year
- Oscar Robertson Trophy, formerly known as the United States Basketball Writers Association National Player of the Year
- National Association of Basketball Coaches Player of the Year
- Sporting News Player of the Year
- John R. Wooden Award
- Naismith College Player of the Year
- NCAA basketball tournament Most Outstanding Player
- USBWA National Freshman of the Year

Arizona Wildcats retired numbers
No.	Player	Career	Achievement
10	Mike Bibby	1996–1998	Naismith Player of the Year
22	Jason Gardner	1999–2003	Wayman Tisdale Award
25	Steve Kerr	1983–1988	USBWA National Courage Award
31	Jason Terry	1995–1999	Naismith Player of the Year
32	Sean Elliott	1985–1989	John R. Wooden Award & Naismith Player of the Year
34	Miles Simon	1994–1998	NCAA Final Four Most Outstanding Player

== Postseason appearances ==
Arizona has appeared in 40 NCAA Division I men's basketball tournaments (36), and four National Invitation Tournaments (NIT). The Arizona Wildcats have been to four Final Fours, which is tied for 21st all time among Division I schools.

=== NCAA tournament ===
==== National championship results ====
Year	Coach	Opponent	Score	Record
1997	Lute Olson	Kentucky Wildcats	84–79 OT	25–9
National Championships			1	

1997 NCAA Tournament results
Round	Opponent	Score
Round #1	#13 South Alabama	65–57
Round #2	#12 College of Charleston	73–69
Sweet 16	#1 Kansas	85–82
Elite 8	#10 Providence	96–92 (OT)
Final 4	#1 North Carolina	66–58
Championship	#1 Kentucky	84–79 (OT)

==== Final Fours results ====
The Arizona Wildcats have been to five Final Fours, which is tied for 21st all time among Division I schools.

1988–Semifinalist	1994–Semifinalist	1997–Champion	2001–Finalist	2026–Semifinalist

Season	Coach	Region	Regional final result	Final Four site	Semifinal result	Championship game result
1987–88	Lute Olson	Seattle	Arizona 70, North Carolina 52	Kansas City, Missouri	Oklahoma 86, Arizona 78	N/A
1993–94	Lute Olson	Los Angeles	Arizona 92, Missouri 72	Charlotte, North Carolina	Arkansas 91, Arizona 82	N/A
1996–97	Lute Olson	Birmingham, Alabama	Arizona 96, Providence 92 OT	Indianapolis	Arizona 66, North Carolina 58	Arizona 84, Kentucky 79 OT
2000–01	Lute Olson	San Antonio	Arizona 87, Illinois 81	Minneapolis	Arizona 80, Michigan State 61	Duke 82, Arizona 72
2025–26	Tommy Lloyd	San Jose, California	Arizona 79, Purdue 64	Indianapolis	Michigan 91, Arizona 74	NA
Total Final Four appearances						5

NCAA tournament seeding history

The NCAA began seeding the NCAA Division I men's basketball tournament with the 1979 edition. The 64-team field started in 1985, which guaranteed that a championship team had to win six games.

Year	Tournament seed	Tournament result
1985	10	1st Round
1986	9	1st Round
1987	10	1st Round
1988	1	Final Four
1989	1	Sweet Sixteen
1990	2	2nd Round
1991	2	Sweet Sixteen
1992	3	1st Round
1993	2	1st Round
1994	2	Final Four
1995	5	1st Round
1996	3	Sweet Sixteen
1997	4	Champions
1998	1	Elite Eight
1999	4	1st Round
2000	1	2nd Round
2001	2	Runner-Up
2002	3	Sweet Sixteen
2003	1	Elite Eight
2004	9	1st Round
2005	3	Elite Eight
2006	8	2nd Round
2007	8	1st Round
2008	10	1st Round
2009	12	Sweet Sixteen
2011	5	Elite Eight
2013	6	Sweet Sixteen
2014	1	Elite Eight
2015	2	Elite Eight
2016	6	1st Round
2017	2	Sweet Sixteen
2018	4	1st Round
2022	1	Sweet Sixteen
2023	2	1st Round
2024	2	Sweet Sixteen
2025	4	Sweet Sixteen
2026	1	Final Four

==== Complete NCAA tournament results ====
The Wildcats have a record of 66–39 (.629). They were NCAA National Champions in 1997, is the only team to date to beat three #1 seeds to win the national championship.

Appearances are grouped by the number of teams in the bracket. Round names are based on what round names were at the time of the tournament, not the present names. The term "Elite eight" began in 1956, "Final four" began in 1975, and "Sweet Sixteen" began in 1988.

Arizona is second No. 2 seed to ever lose a first-round game, losing 64–61 to No. 15 seed Santa Clara, led by future NBA star Steve Nash in 1993.

Sixteen to Thirty-two team tournament

Year	Round	Opponent	Result	Location
1951	First round	Kansas State	L 59–61	Municipal Auditorium (Kansas City, MO)
1976	First Round; Regional semifinals Regional finals	Georgetown; UNLV; UCLA	W 83–76; W 114–109; L 66–82	Wells Fargo Arena (Tempe, AZ); Pauley Pavilion (Los Angeles, CA); Pauley Pavilion (Los Angeles, CA)
1977	First round	Southern Illinois	L 77–81	Omaha Civic Auditorium (Omaha, NE)

Sixty-four teams

Year	Seed	Round	Opponent	Result	Location
1985	No. 10 (W)	First Round	No. 7 (W) Alabama	L 64–66	The Pit (Albuquerque, NM)
1986	No. 9 (W)	First Round	No. 8 (W) Auburn	L 63–73	Long Beach Arena (Long Beach, CA)
1987	No. 10 (W)	First Round	No. 7 (W) UTEP	L 57–70	McKale Center (Tucson, AZ)
1988	No. 1 (W)	First Round; Second Round; Sweet Sixteen; Elite Eight; Final Four	No. 16 (W) Cornell; No. 8 (W) Seton Hall; No. 5 (W) Iowa; No. 2 (W) North Carolina; No. 1 Oklahoma	W 90–50; W 84–55; W 99–79; W 71–58; L 78–86	Pauley Pavilion (Los Angeles, CA); Kingdome (Seattle, WA); Kemper Arena (Kansas City, MO)
1989	No. 1 (W)	First Round; Second Round; Sweet Sixteen	No. 16 (W) Robert Morris; No. 9 (W)Clemson; No. 4 (W) UNLV	W 94–60; W 94–68; L 67–68	Taco Bell Arena (Boise, ID); McNichols Sports Arena (Denver, CO)
1990	No. 2 (W)	First Round; Second Round	No. 15 (W) South Florida; No. 7 (W) Alabama	W 79–67; L 55–77	Long Beach Arena (Long Beach, CA)
1991	No. 2 (W)	First Round; Second Round; Sweet Sixteen	No. 15 (W)St. Francis (PA); No. 10 (W)BYU; No. 3 (W) Seton Hall	W 93–80; W 76–61; L 69–84	Jon M. Huntsman Center (Salt Lake City, UT); Kingdome (Seattle, WA)
1992	No. 3 (SE)	First Round	No. 14 East Tennessee State	L 80–87	Omni Coliseum (Atlanta, GA)
1993	No. 2 (W)	First Round	No. 15 (W) Santa Clara	L 61–64	Jon M. Huntsman Center (Salt Lake City, UT)
1994	No. 2 (W)	First Round; Second Round; Sweet Sixteen; Elite Eight; Final Four	No. 15 (W) Loyola (MD); No. 7 (W) Virginia; No. 3 (W) Louisville; No. 1 (W) Missouri; No. 1 Arkansas	W 81–55; W 71–58; W 82–70; W 92–72; L 82–91	Sleep Train Arena (Sacramento, CA); Los Angeles Memorial Sports Arena (Los Angeles, CA); Charlotte Coliseum (Charlotte, NC)
1995	No. 5 (MW)	First Round	No. 12 (MW) Miami	L 82–91	UD Arena (Dayton, OH)
1996	No. 3 (W)	First Round; Second Round; Sweet Sixteen	No. 14 (W) Valparaiso; No. 6 (W) Iowa; No. 2 (W) Kansas	W 90–51; W 87–73; L 80–83	Wells Fargo Arena (Tempe, AZ); McNichols Sports Arena (Denver, CO)
1997	No. 4 (SE)	First Round; Second Round; Sweet Sixteen; Elite Eight; Final Four; National Championship	No. 13 (SE) South Alabama; No. 12 (SE) Charleston; No. 1 (SE) Kansas; No. 10 (SE) Providence; No. 1 North Carolina; No. 1 Kentucky	W 65–57; W 73–69; W 85–82 ^{2OT} W 96–92 ^{2OT} W 65–58; W 84–79 ^{OT}	Memphis Pyramid (Memphis, TN); BJCC Arena (Birmingham, AL); RCA Dome (Indianapolis, IN)
1998	No. 1 (W)	First Round; Second Round; Sweet Sixteen; Elite Eight	No. 16 (W) Nicholls State; No. 9 (W) Illinois; No. 9 Maryland; No. 3 (W) Utah	W 99–60; W 82–49; W 84–79; L 51–76	Sleep Train Arena (Sacramento, CA); Honda Center (Anaheim, CA)

Sixty-five teams

Year	Seed	Round	Opponent	Result	Location
1999†	No. 4 (MW)	First Round	No. 13 (MW) Oklahoma	L 60–61	Bradley Center (Milwaukee, WI)
2000	No. 1 (W)	First Round; Second Round	No. 16 (W) Jackson State; No. 8 (W) Wisconsin	W 71–47; L 59–66	Jon M. Huntsman Center (Salt Lake City, UT)
2001	No. 2 (MW)	First Round; Second Round; Sweet Sixteen; Elite Eight; Final Four; National Championship	No. 15 (MW) Eastern Illinois; No. 10 (MW) Butler; No. 3 (MW) Ole Miss; No. 1 (MW) Illinois; No. 1 Michigan State; No. 1 Duke	W 101–76; W 73–52; W 66–56; W 87–81; W 80–61; L 72–82	Kemper Arena (Kansas City, MO); Alamodome (San Antonio, TX); Hubert H. Humphrey Metrodome (Minneapolis, MN)
2002	No. 3 (W)	First Round; Second Round; Sweet Sixteen	No. 14 (W) UC Santa Barbara; No. 11 (W) Wyoming; No. 2 Oklahoma	W 86–81; W 80–68; L 67–88	The Pit (Albuquerque, NM); SAP Center (San Jose, CA)
2003	No. 1 (W)	First Round; Second Round; Sweet Sixteen; Elite Eight	No. 16 (W) Vermont; No. 9 Gonzaga; No. 5 Notre Dame; No. 2 Kansas	W 80–51; W 96–95 ^{2OT} W 88–71; L 75–78	Jon M. Huntsman Center (Salt Lake City, UT); Honda Center (Anaheim, CA)
2004	No. 8 (ATL)	First Round	No. 9 (ATL) Seton Hall	L 76–80	PNC Arena (Raleigh, NC)
2005	No. 3 (CHI)	First Round; Second Round; Sweet Sixteen; Elite Eight	No. 14 (CHI) Utah State; No. 11 (CHI) UAB; No. 2 (CHI) Oklahoma State; No. 1 (CHI) Illinois	W 66–53; W 85–63; W 79–78; L 89–90 ^{OT}	Taco Bell Arena (Boise, ID); Allstate Arena (Rosemont, IL)
2006	No. 8 (MN)	First Round; Second Round	No. 9 Wisconsin; No. 1 (MN) Villanova	W 94–75; L 78–82	Wells Fargo Center (Philadelphia, PA)
2007	No. 8 (MW)	First Round	No. 9 (MW) Purdue	L 63–72	Smoothie King Center (New Orleans, LA)
2008†	No. 10 (W)	First Round	No. 7 (W) West Virginia	L 65–75	Verizon Center (Washington, D.C.)
2009	No. 12 (MW)	First Round; Second Round; Sweet Sixteen	No. 5 Utah; No. 13 (MW) Cleveland State; No. 1 (MW) Louisville	W 84–71; W 81–57; L 64–103	American Airlines Arena (Miami, FL); Lucas Oil Stadium (Indianapolis, IN)

First four era

Year	Seed	Round	Opponent	Result	Location
2011*	No. 5 (W)	First Round; Second Round; Sweet Sixteen; Elite Eight	No. 12 (W) Memphis; No. 4 (W) Texas; No. 1 (W) Duke; No. 3 (W) UConn	W 77–75; W 70–69; W 93–77; L 63–65	BOK Center (Tulsa, OK); Honda Center (Anaheim, CA)
2013*	No. 6 (W)	First Round; Second Round; Sweet Sixteen	No. 11 (W) Belmont; No. 14 (W) Harvard; No. 2 (W) Ohio State	W 81–64; W 74–51; L 70–73	Vivint Smart Home Arena (Salt Lake City, UT); Staples Center (Los Angeles, CA)
2014*	No. 1 (W)	First Round; Second Round; Sweet Sixteen; Elite Eight	No. 16 (W) Weber State; No. 8 (W) Gonzaga; No. 4 (W) San Diego State; No. 2 (W) Wisconsin	W 68–59; W 84–61; W 70–64; L 63–64 ^{OT}	Viejas Arena (San Diego, CA); Honda Center (Anaheim, CA)
2015*	No. 2 (W)	First Round; Second Round; Sweet Sixteen; Elite Eight	No. 15 (W) Texas Southern; No. 10 (W) Ohio State; No. 6 (W) Xavier; No. 1 (W) Wisconsin	W 72–53; W 73–59; W 68–60; L 78–85	Moda Center (Portland, OR); Staples Center (Los Angeles, CA)
2016	No. 6 (S)	First Round	No. 11 (S) Wichita State	L 55–65	Dunkin' Donuts Center (Providence, RI)
2017†	No. 2 (W)	First Round; Second Round; Sweet Sixteen	No. 15 (W) North Dakota; No. 7 (W) Saint Mary's; No. 11 (W) Xavier	W 100–82; W 69–60; L 71–73	Vivint Smart Home Arena (Salt Lake City, UT); SAP Center (San Jose, CA)
2018†	No. 4 (S)	First Round	No. 13 (S) Buffalo	L 68–89	Taco Bell Arena (Boise, ID)
2020††	No tournament due to COVID-19 pandemic				
2022	No. 1 (S)	First Round; Second Round; Sweet Sixteen	No. 16 Wright State; No. 9 (S) TCU; No. 5 (S) Houston	W 87–70; W 85–80; L 60–72	Viejas Arena (San Diego, CA); AT&T Center (San Antonio, TX)
2023	No. 2 (S)	First Round	No. 15 (S) Princeton	L 55–59	Golden 1 Center (Sacramento, CA)
2024	No. 2 (W)	First Round; Second Round; Sweet Sixteen	No. 15 (W) Long Beach State; No. 7 (W) Dayton; No. 6 (W) Clemson	W 85–65; W 78–68; L 72–77	Delta Center (Salt Lake City, UT); Crypto.com Arena (Los Angeles, CA)
2025	No. 4 (E)	First Round; Second Round; Sweet Sixteen	No. 13 (E) Akron; No. 5 (E) Oregon; No. 1 (E) Duke	W 93–65; W 87–83; L 93–100	Climate Pledge Arena (Seattle, WA); Prudential Center (Newark, NJ)
2026	No. 1 (W)	First Round; Second Round; Sweet Sixteen; Elite Eight; Final Four	No. 16 (W) LIU; No. 9 (W) Utah State; No. 4 (W) Arkansas; No. 2 (W) Purdue; No. 1 (MW) Michigan	W 92–58; W 78–66; W 109–88; W 79–64; L 73–91	Viejas Arena (San Diego, CA); SAP Center (San Jose, CA); Lucas Oil Stadium (Indianapolis, IN)

*Following the introduction of the First Four round in 2011, the Round of 64 and Round of 32 were referred to as the Second Round and Third Round, respectively, from 2011 to 2015, then from 2016 moving forward, the Round 64 and Round of 32 will be called the First and Second rounds.

†† – As a result of the COVID-19 pandemic, the 2020 NCAA tournament was cancelled.

Record by round

Round	Record	Most recent appearances
First Four	N/A*	N/A*
Round of 64	23–15	2026
Round of 32	21–3	2026
Sweet 16	9–10	2026
Elite 8	5–5	2026
Final Four	2–3	2026
National Championship	1–1	2001

*Since its inception in 2011, Arizona has not participated in the First Four

=== NIT results ===
The Arizona Wildcats have appeared in the four National Invitation Tournaments (NIT). Arizona's combined record is 0–4.

Year	Round	Opponent	Result/Score
1946	First round	Kentucky	L 53–77
1950	First round	La Salle	L 66–72
1951	First round	Dayton	L 68–74
2012	First round	Bucknell	L 54–65

=== Championships ===
Though the automatic berth in the NCAA tournament is given to the conference tournament winner, the Pac–12 declares the team with the best record in the regular season the "official" conference champion.

National championships

National championships	Type	Year
1	NCAA National; Championship	1997
1 National Championship

Regular season championships

Regular season championships	Type	Year
18*	Pac-12 regular season conference championship	1986, 1988, 1989, 1990, 1991, 1993, 1994, 1998, 2000, 2003, 2005, 2011, 2014, 2015, 2017*, 2018*, 2022, 2024
1	Big 12 regular season conference championship	2026
12	BIAA regular season conference championship	1932, 1933, 1936, 1940, 1943, 1946, 1947, 1948, 1949, 1950, 1951, 1953
1	WAC regular season conference championship	1976
30 total regular season championships
*Vacated by NCAA

Conference tournament championships

Conference championships	Type	Year
9*	Pac-12 Tournament Championship	1988, 1989, 1990, 2000, 2015, 2017*, 2018*, 2021, 2022
1	Big 12 Tournament Championship	2026
10 total conference tournament championships
*Vacated by NCAA

Invitational tournament championships

Invitational tournament championships	Type	Year
29	Fiesta Bowl Classic	1974, 1975, 1985, 1986, 1987, 1988, 1989, 1990, 1991, 1992, 1993, 1994, 1995, 1996, 1997, 1998, 2001, 2002, 2003, 2004, 2005, 2006, 2007, 2008, 2010, 2011, 2012
3	NIT Season Tip-Off	1990†, 1995†, 1999†, 2013†
3	Maui Invitational Tournament	2000†, 2014†, 2022†
1	Wooden Legacy	2019†
1	2K Sports Classic	2001†
1	Roman Main Event	2021†
38 invitational tournament championships
†Denotes early-season invitational tournament

Conference tournament championship game appearances

U of A has won the Big 12 Tournament, previously won the ninth Pac-12 tournament titles, a record ten times (two appearances in 2017 and 2018 were later vacated by the NCAA, seven total), including three straight times from 1988 to 1990.
Source: 2023–24 Arizona Wildcats Media Guide

Year	Champion	Score	Runner-up	Arena	City	Tournament MVP
1988	Arizona	93–67	Oregon State	McKale Center	Tucson, Arizona	Sean Elliott, Arizona
1989	Arizona	73–51	Stanford	Great Western Forum	Inglewood, California	Sean Elliott, Arizona
1990	Arizona	94–78	UCLA	University Activity Center	Tempe, Arizona	Jud Buechler & Matt Muehlebach, Arizona
2002	Arizona	81–71	USC	Staples Center	Los Angeles, California	Luke Walton, Arizona
2005	Washington	81–72	Arizona	Staples Center	Los Angeles, California	Salim Stoudamire, Arizona
2011	Washington	77–75^{OT}	Arizona	Staples Center	Los Angeles, California	Isaiah Thomas, Washington
2012	Colorado	53–51	Arizona	Staples Center	Los Angeles, California	Carlon Brown, Colorado
2014	UCLA	75–71	Arizona	MGM Grand Garden Arena	Paradise, Nevada	Kyle Anderson, UCLA
2015	Arizona	80–52	Oregon	MGM Grand Garden Arena	Paradise, Nevada	Brandon Ashley, Arizona
2017	Arizona*	83–80	Oregon	T-Mobile Arena	Paradise, Nevada	Allonzo Trier, Arizona
2018	Arizona*	75–61	USC	T-Mobile Arena	Paradise, Nevada	Deandre Ayton, Arizona
2022	Arizona	84–76	UCLA	T-Mobile Arena	Paradise, Nevada	Bennedict Mathurin, Arizona
2023	Arizona	61–59	UCLA	T-Mobile Arena	Paradise, Nevada	Ąžuolas Tubelis, Arizona
2025	Houston	72–64	Arizona	T-Mobile Center	Kansas City, Missouri	Emanuel Sharp, Houston
2026	Arizona	79–74	Houston	T-Mobile Center	Kansas City, Missouri	Jaden Bradley, Arizona

† – All NCAA tournament wins in 1999, 2008, 2017, and 2018 were vacated by the NCAA in its March 2015 report of Infractions on its athletics department by the NCAA making their official record of 53–36 (.596) due to 2017–18 NCAA men's basketball corruption scandal. The players involved in the scandal played in every game in the 2016–17 and 23 games in the 2017–18 season, resulting in a 9–8 record.

== All-time statistical leaders ==
Career points
Player	Years	Points
Sean Elliott	1985–89	2,555
Bob Elliott	1973–77	2,131
Jason Gardner	1999–2003	1,984
Salim Stoudamire	2001–05	1,960
Khalid Reeves	1990–94	1,925

Single season points
Player	Years	Points
Khalid Reeves	1994	848
Sean Elliott	1988	743
Derrick Williams	2011	741
Sean Elliott	1989	735
Deandre Ayton	2018	704

Freshman points
Player	Years	Points
Deandre Ayton	2018	704
Brayden Burries	2026	626
Jerryd Bayless	2008	592
Coniel Norman	1973	576
Lauri Markkanen	2017	576

Rebounds
Player	Years	Rebounds
Al Fleming	1973–76	1,190
Bob Elliott	1974–77	1,083
Channing Frye	2001–05	975
Kaleb Tarczewski	2013–16	879
Anthony Cook	1986–89	861

Season rebounds
Player	Years	Rebounds
Deandre Ayton	2018	405
Jordan Hill	2009	375
Leo Johnson	1951	373
Bill Reeves	1956	343
Al Fleming	1975	373

Freshman rebounds
Player	Years	Rebounds
Deandre Ayton	2018	405
Aaron Gordon	2014	303
Bob Elliott	1974	278
Zeke Nnaji	2020	276
Lauri Markkanen	2017	266

Assists
Player	Years	Assists
Russell Brown	1978–81	810
Mustafa Shakur	2004–07	670
Damon Stoudamire	1992–95	663
Jason Gardner	2000–03	622
Luke Walton	2000–03	582

Season assists
Player	Years	Assists
Russell Brown	1979	247
T. J. McConnell	2015	238
Reggie Geary	1996	231
Damon Stoudamire	1995	220
Mustafa Shakur	2007	215

Freshman assists
Player	Years	Assists
Russell Brown	1978	197
Mike Bibby	1997	178
Nico Mannion	2020	169
Jason Gardner	2000	162
Mustafa Shakur	2004	147

Steals
Player	Years	Steals
Jason Terry	1996–99	245
Hassan Adams	2003–06	238
Jason Gardner	2000–03	225
Reggie Geary	1993–96	208
Kenny Lofton	1986–89	200

Season steals
Player	Years	Steals
Mike Bibby	1998	87
Jason Terry	1997	85
T. J. McConnell	2015	83
Hassan Adams	2006	82
Jason Terry	1999	80

Freshman steals
Player	Years	Steals
Mike Bibby	1997	76
Gilbert Arenas	2000	71
Brayden Burries	2026	59
Stanley Johnson	2015	57
Jason Gardner	2000	55

Blocked shots
Player	Years	Blocks
Anthony Cook	1986–89	278
Channing Frye	2001–05	258
Loren Woods	2000–01	186
Ed Stokes	1990–93	167
Christian Koloko	2019–22	162

Season blocks
Player	Years	Blocks
Christian Koloko	2022	102
Loren Woods	2000	102
Channing Frye	2005	85
Anthony Cook	1989	84
Loren Woods	2001	84

Freshman blocks
Player	Years	Blocks
Deandre Ayton	2018	66
Anthony Cook	1986	50
Channing Frye	2002	50
Ed Stokes	1990	49
Rondae Hollis-Jefferson	2014	40

Games played
Player	Years	Games
Dusan Ristic	2015–18	141
Kyle Fogg	2009–12	139
Solomon Hill	2010–13	139
Jason Gardner	2000–03	136
Jordin Mayes	2011–14	136

Freshman games played
Player	Years	Games
Brayden Burries	2026	39
Ivan Kharchenkov	2026	39

Wins
Player	Years	Wins
Dusan Ristic	2015–18	115
Parker Jackson-Cartwright	2015–18	110
Kaleb Tarczewski	2013–16	110
Matt Muehlebach	1988–91	110
Jason Gardner	2000–03	107

=== School records ===
==== Individual career ====
Statistic	Player	Total
Points	Sean Elliott	2,555
Scoring average	Coniel Norman	23.9 PPG
Field goals	Sean Elliott	892
Field goal attempts	Sean Elliott	1,750
Field goal percentage	Joseph Blair	.613
3-point field goals	Salim Stoudamire‡	342
3-point field goal attempts	Jason Gardner	875
3-point field goal percentage	Steve Kerr	.573
Free throws	Sean Elliott	623
Free throw attempts	Sean Elliott	786
Free throw percentage	Dylan Rigdon	.872
Rebounds	Al Fleming	1,190
Rebound average	Joe Skaisgir	11.2 RPG
Assists	Russell Brown	810
Steals	Jason Terry	245
Blocked shots	Anthony Cook	278
Games played	Dušan Ristić	141
Games started	Jason Gardner	135
Minutes played	Jason Gardner	4,825
Average pinutes per game	Jason Gardner	35.5 MPG
Most wins in a career	Dušan Ristić	115 Wins

Note ‡ indicates player was also conference record holder.

==== Team season records ====
Statistic	Player	Total (season)
Points	Khalid Reeves	848 (1993–94')
Scoring average	Khalid Reeves	24.2 PPG (1993–94')
Field goals	Khalid Reeves; Deandre Ayton	276 (1993–94') (2017–18')
Field goal attempts	Khalid Reeves	572 (1993–94')
Field goal percentage	Al Fleming	.667 (1973–74')
3-point field goals	Salim Stoudamire ‡	120 (2004-05')
3-point field goal attempts	Caleb Love	277 (2023-24')
3-point field goal percentage	Steve Kerr ‡	.573 (1987–88')
Free throws	Derrick Williams	247 (2010-11')
Free throw attempts	Derrick Williams ‡	331 (2010-11')
Free throw percentage	Salim Stoudamire	.910 (2004–05)
Rebounds	Deandre Ayton	405 (2017–18')
Rebound average	Bill Reeves	13.2 RPG (1955–56')
Assists	Russell Brown	247 (1978–79')
Steals	Mike Bibby	87 (1997–98')
Blocked shots	Loren Woods	102 (1999-00')
Games played	6 players	39 Games
Games started	4 players	39 Games
Minutes played	Chase Budinger	1,317 (2008-09')
Average minutes per game	Steve Kerr	38.4 MPG (1985–86')

Note ‡ indicates player was also conference record holder.

==== Freshman single season leaders ====
Statistic	Player	Total
Points	Deandre Ayton†	704
Scoring average	Coniel Norman	24.0 PPG
Field goals	Deandre Ayton†	276
Field goal attempts	Coniel Norman	476
Field goal percentage (min. 100 FG)	Deandre Ayton	.612
3-point field goals	Salim Stoudamire	73
3-point field goal attempts	Jason Gardner	193
3-point field goal percentage	Khalid Reeves	.463
Free throws made	Jerry Bayless	187
Free throw attempts	Derrick Williams	232
Free throw percentage	Salim Stoudamire†	.904
Rebounds	Deandre Ayton†	405
Rebound average	Deandre Ayton†	11.6 RPG
Assists	Russell Brown	197
Steals	Mike Bibby	76
Blocked shots	Deandre Ayton	66
Games played	2 players	39
Games started	2 players	39
Played	Jason Gardner	1,244
Average minutes per game	Jason Gardner	36.6 MPG
Double-doubles (pts/rebs.)	Deandre Ayton†	24
30-point games	Coniel Norman	6
20-point games	Deandre Ayton†	17
Double-digit scoring games	Deandre Ayton†	33

Note † indicates player was also the yearly Pac-12 leader.

==== Freshman single game leaders ====
Statistic	Player	Total	Opponent (date)
Points	Jerryd Bayless	39	ASU (2/10/08)
Made field goals	Coniel Norman	17	Wyoming (2/1/73)
Field goal attempts	Coniel Norman	27	BYU (2/24/73)
Field goal percentage (min. 12 attempts)	Deandre Ayton	.917	at WSU (1/31/17)
Made three-point field goals	4 players	6	-
Three-point field goal attempts	Mike Bibby	11	UNC (3/29/97)
Three-point field goal percentage (min. 6 attempts)	Bennedict Mathurin	.857	at Oregon State (1/14/21)
Made free throws	Jerryd Bayless	18	at Houston (1/12/08)
Free throw attempts	Derrick Williams	21	Wisconsin (11/23/09)
Free throw percentage (min. 10 attempts)	8 players tied at 100%	-	
Rebounds	Bob Elliott	25	ASU (2/2/74)
Assists	Russell Brown	15	Utah (1/21/78)
Steals	Mike Bibby	8	Texas (12/9/96)
Blocks	Grant Jerrett; Deandre Ayton	6	at Oregon State (1/12/13) at Stanford (1/20/18)
Minutes played	Allonzo Trier	53	at USC (1/9/16)
Most points in NCAA debut	Eric Money	37	Cal State Bakersfield (11/29/72)

Note ‡ indicates player was also single game record holder.

=== Home court winning streaks ===
Rank	Wins	Years	Coach
1	81^	1945–51	Fred Enke
2	71	1987–92	Lute Olson
3	49	2013–16	Sean Miller
4	38	1975–78	Fred Snowden
5	37	1997–99	Lute Olson

^Played at Bear Down Gym

=== Rankings ===
Arizona teams have spent a total of 47 weeks ranked number 1, most recently in 2025. Arizona has been ranked for 23 straight weeks, the 6th longest active streak.

The Associated Press began its basketball poll on January 20, 1949. The following is a summary of those annual polls. Starting in the 1961–62 season, AP provided a preseason (PS) poll. AP did a post-tournament poll in 1953, 1954, 1974 and 1975. The following table summarizes Arizona history in the AP Poll: The Wildcats longest streak of weeks ranked inside the AP Top 25 poll is 141 weeks, starting with the 1988 pre-season poll and ended with the March 13, 1995 poll. The 141 weeks is 12th most all-time. Arizona was ranked in 324 out of 326 polls from 1988 until 2005, which is more than any school during the same time frame.

Year	Appearances	Pct	High	Low	Average	Final ranking
2027	2	100%	5	12	8	–
2026	20	100%	1	13	2	3
2025	11	52%	9	24	18	15
2024	21	100%	1	12	5	11
2023	19	100%	4	17	8	8
2022	17	89%	2	17	6	2
2020	13	65%	12	25	19	NR
2018	17	89%	2	23	13	12
2017	19	100%	4	20	11	4
2016	19	100%	7	23	14	17
2015	19	100%	2	10	5	5
2014	20	100%	1	6	3	4
2013	20	100%	3	21	10	21
2012	3	16%	15	23	18	NR
2011	7	37%	10	20	16	17
2008	7	35%	17	22	19	NR
2007	15	79%	7	24	14	NR
2006	8	42%	9	24	17	24
2005	19	100%	8	21	13	9
2004	19	100%	3	22	11	22
2003	19	100%	1	4	2	2
2002	17	94%	4	20	12	7
2001	19	100%	1	21	9	5
2000	19	100%	2	10	5	4
1999	18	100%	6	18	10	12
1998	18	100%	1	8	4	4
1997	18	100%	6	19	12	15
1996	17	94%	3	19	11	11
1995	18	100%	5	15	10	15
1994	18	100%	6	19	12	9
1993	18	100%	3	22	10	5
1992	18	100%	2	11	6	10
1991	17	100%	2	9	5	8
1990	17	100%	2	24	18	14
1989	18	100%	1	12	6	1
1988	17	100%	1	17	3	2
1987	2	11%	19	20	20	NR
1985	1	6%	19	19	19	NR
1977	15	88%	8	20	14	NR
1976	5	29%	10	18	13	15
1975	15	79%	10	19	15	NR
1974	8	44%	12	20	15	NR
1951	8	67%	11	16	14	12
1950	5	50%	15	19	17	15

- Ranked in 40 out of 75 seasons (53%)

=== Record vs. Big 12 opponents ===
The Arizona Wildcats lead the all-time series regardless of conference affiliation vs. eight other Big 12 opponents, trailing only Houston, Kansas, Kansas State and Texas Tech.

Opponent	Wins	Losses	Pct.	Streak
Arizona State	165	87	(.655)	Arizona 7
Baylor	9	5	(.643)	Arizona 4
BYU	23	20	(.535)	Arizona 2
Cincinnati	6	0	(1.000)	Arizona 6
Colorado	28	16	(.636)	Arizona 6
Houston	8	8	(.500)	Arizona 2
Iowa State	7	4	(.636)	Arizona 2
Kansas	6	10	(.375)	Arizona 1
Kansas State	7	9	(.438)	Arizona 1
Oklahoma State	4	0	(1.000)	Arizona 4
TCU	3	2	(.600)	Arizona 3
Texas Tech	26	30	(.464)	Texas Tech 1
UCF	3	0	(1.000)	Arizona 3
Utah	42	32	(.568)	Arizona 5
West Virginia	5	3	(.625)	Arizona 2

- Total (342–226, .602)
- Note all-time series includes non-conference matchups.

==== Past record vs. Pac-12 opponents ====
The Arizona Wildcats lead the all-time series regardless of conference affiliation vs. ten other Pac-12 opponents, trailing only UCLA.

Opponent	Wins	Losses	Pct.	Streak
Arizona State	165	87	(.655)	Arizona 7
Cal	75	30	(.714)	Arizona 15
Colorado	28	16	(.636)	Arizona 6
Oregon	56	38	(.596)	Arizona 1
Oregon State	72	23	(.758)	Oregon State 1
Stanford	73	33	(.689)	Arizona 1
UCLA	51	65	(.440)	UCLA 1
USC	76	47	(.618)	Arizona 1
Utah	42	32	(.568)	Arizona 5
Washington	61	31	(.663)	Arizona 8
Washington State	70	20	(.778)	Washington State 2

- Total (768–422, .645)
- Note all-time series includes non-conference matchups and Pac-12 Tournament.

=== Conference records ===
Years	Conferences	Win–loss	Pct.
1904–1931	None	—	—
1931–1962	Border Conference	231–144	(.616)
1962–1978	WAC	98–98	(.500)
1978–2011	Pacific-10 Conference	400–194	(.673)
2011–2024	Pac-12 Conference	143–69†	(.675)
2024–present	Big 12 Conference	30–8	(.789)
Total	All conferences	992–513	(.659)

Note:† 30 Pac-12 wins vacated due to NCAA infractions. Pac-12 record is 173–69 (.715).

== Game day traditions ==
Arizona's home games include many traditions involving The Pride of Arizona pep band and the Zona Zoo.

- Before every game, the band splits into four sections in the four sides of McKale Center. They play Bear Down Arizona in sequence before the band runs back to the student section in the north stands and plays all of Bear Down. The band also yells "Hi fans!" to the fans, who respond by yelling "Hi band!" and "Hi Tommy!" to head coach Tommy Lloyd, who responds by waving to the band.
- While the opposing team's players are being introduced, the student section turns their backs to the court. As each player's name is announced, they will yell "Sucks!" In the interest of sportsmanship, though, the Athletic Department is attempting to phase this tradition out.
- At the start of each half, the entire crowd will stand until the other team scores a point. The fans will also clap rhythmically with the band as it plays a four-note refrain repeatedly until the ball is tipped or inbounded.
- When an opposing player fouls an Arizona player, the band and students chant, while pointing at the opposing player, "You! You! You! You! You! You! You! You! You! On you, that's who!" If the foul occurs during a shot and the player makes the shot, the chant is instead "Hey! Hey! Hey! Hey! No no no no! No no no no! No no no no! No no no no! Don't touch me!"
- If an opposing player accrues four fouls during the game, they will chant "Four!" four times while waving four fingers. If a player fouls out, the band plays the beat from "Another One Bites the Dust", concluding with the band and students yelling "Hey! We're gonna get you too!"
- When opposing players are attempting foul shots, besides attempting to distract the player, the band and students have several chants, but the only constant one is yelled if the player misses their first shot of a two-shot foul, in which case they yell "Nice shot, buddy!"
- If Arizona is beating an opponent by a comfortable margin late in the game, the band and students will chant "Go start the bus!" repeatedly. If an opponent makes a big play, they will chant "It just doesn't matter!"
- Beginning in the 1980s, the "Ooh Aah Man," Joe Cavaleri, made regular appearances at McKale to pump up the crowd. He would start by spelling out "A-R-I-Z-O-N-A!" with his body as the crowd chanted along. He would then direct the crowd in chanting "U of A!", first by each side of the arena, then by the north and south sides and east and west sides simultaneously then by the whole arena. His routine usually involved pulling off his shirt and pants to reveal another Arizona shirt and shorts underneath. Cavaleri was diagnosed with Parkinson's disease in 2010 and only made a few appearances during the 2010–2011 season; he officially retired from his "superfan" duties in 2013.
- At the end of every home game (and every Arizona athletics event the band is present at) the band plays Arizona's alma mater, "All Hail, Arizona!" Students and fans link arms, sway as they sing and jump up and down while singing the last part of the song.
- For a time during the Sean Miller era, the team hosted an annual "White Out" game. All fans were encouraged to wear white T-shirts. The most recent white out game was on December 7, 2013, versus UNLV. This was the fourth consecutive season to include a white out game. The tradition has not continued under Tommy Lloyd (the Arizona women's basketball program has continued to have white out games at McKale Center under coach Adia Barnes).

== Facilities ==
=== Beardown Gym ===
Prior to playing its games at the McKale Center, Arizona played games at Bear Down Gym from 1927 until 1973. Arizona won its inaugural game against Arizona State, then known as Tempe State Teachers College, by a score of 29–18.

=== McKale Center ===
Arizona currently plays its home games at McKale Center, a 14,688-seat multi-purpose arena in Tucson, that opened in 1973. The McKale Center is the fifth different home site in program history.

At McKale Center, Arizona enjoys one of the nation's best home court advantages. The Wildcats have compiled a 651–121 (an .847 winning percentage) record since moving to the McKale Center permanently. Through the 2023–24 season, McKale Center has hosted 10,154,639 fans for Arizona home games and the Wildcats have averaged 13,035 fans (better than 95% capacity) per game during that time. The 2014–2015 season marked the highest average attendance in McKale Center history with an average 14,591 (100% capacity) Wildcats fans at each home game.

== Radio network affiliates ==
The current flagship radio station for men's basketball is Tucson sports radio station KCUB, branded as "Wildcats Radio 1290". From 1983 until 2004, the flagship station was news/talk radio station KNST. The primary play-by-play voice of Wildcat football, baseball and men's basketball, since 1987, is Brian Jeffries (after starting out as the color commentator for former CBS Sports announcer Ray Scott, who called Wildcats games from 1984 through the spring of 1987).

The Phoenix radio affiliate for Arizona Wildcats football and men's basketball is KGME, branded as "Fox Sports 910."

== See also ==
- List of NCAA Division I Men's Final Four appearances by coach
- NCAA Division I Men's Final Four appearances by school
- NCAA Division I men's basketball tournament consecutive appearances
- Arizona Wildcats women's basketball
