= Al Fleming (basketball) =

American basketball player

Personal information
- Born: April 5, 1954 Chicago, Illinois, U.S.
- Died: May 14, 2003 (aged 49) Michigan City, Indiana, U.S.
- Listed height: 6 ft 7 in (2.01 m)
- Listed weight: 215 lb (98 kg)

Career information
- High school: Elston (Michigan City, Indiana)
- College: Arizona (1972–1976)
- NBA draft: 1976: 2nd round, 30th overall pick
- Drafted by: Phoenix Suns
- Position: Small forward
- Number: 30

Career history
- 1977–1978: Seattle SuperSonics
- 1977–1978: Anchorage Northern Knights

Career highlights
- 2× First-team All-WAC (1975, 1976)
- Stats at NBA.com
- Stats at Basketball Reference

Albert Fleming Jr. (April 5, 1954 – May 14, 2003) was an American professional basketball small forward who played one season in the National Basketball Association (NBA) as a member of the Seattle SuperSonics during the 1977–78 season.

He attended the University of Arizona where he played for the basketball program. When he finished his career, he was the all-time school leader for scoring. He has since moved down to the tenth all-time in scoring, as well as fifth in field goal percentage and fourth in rebounds per game.

Fleming was drafted by the Phoenix Suns during the second round (30^{th} pick overall) in the 1976 NBA draft, but was waived before the start of the season. He signed with the Pacers on October 13, 1976, but was waived a week later. In July, he signed with the SuperSonics and finished the season with them. Seattle waived Fleming in November 1978.

After his career in the NBA was over, he played with teams in Sweden, Italy, Israel, Portugal and Uruguay. Fleming played for the Anchorage Northern Knights of the Continental Basketball Association during the 1977–78 season.

Fleming retired at age 28 and resided in his hometown of Michigan City, Indiana. After being diagnosed with cancer five years prior, Fleming died after on May 14, 2003, at age 49.

== Career statistics ==
Legend
GP	Games played	GS	Games started	MPG	Minutes per game
FG%	Field goal percentage	3P%	3-point field goal percentage	FT%	Free throw percentage
RPG	Rebounds per game	APG	Assists per game	SPG	Steals per game
BPG	Blocks per game	PPG	Points per game	**Bold**	Career high

=== NBA ===
==== Regular season ====
Year	Team	GP	MPG	FG%	FT%	RPG	APG	SPG	BPG	PPG
1977–78	Seattle	20	4.9	.484	.588	1.5	.4	.0	.3	2.0

==== Playoffs ====
Year	Team	GP	MPG	FG%	FT%	RPG	APG	SPG	BPG	PPG
1978	Seattle	5	4.2	.333	.750	.8	.4	.2	.0	1.4
