= 2026 Big East men's basketball tournament =

American college basketball postseason tournament

- Classification: Division I
- Season: 2025–26
- Teams: 11
- Site: Madison Square Garden; New York City
- Champions: St. John's (5th title)
- Winning coach: Rick Pitino (5th title)
- MVP: Zuby Ejiofor, St. John's
- Television: Peacock/NBCSN, FS1, Fox

2025–26 Big East men's basketball standings
	Conf.				Overall
Team	W		L	PCT	W		L	PCT
No. 10 St. John's †	18	–	2	.900	30	–	7	.811
No. 2 UConn	17	–	3	.850	34	–	6	.850
Villanova	15	–	5	.750	24	–	9	.727
Seton Hall	10	–	10	.500	21	–	12	.636
Creighton	9	–	11	.450	16	–	18	.471
DePaul	8	–	12	.400	16	–	16	.500
Marquette	7	–	13	.350	12	–	20	.375
Butler	7	–	13	.350	16	–	16	.500
Providence	7	–	13	.350	15	–	18	.455
Xavier	6	–	14	.300	15	–	18	.455
Georgetown	6	–	14	.300	16	–	18	.471
† 2026 Big East tournament winner Rankings from AP poll

The 2026 Big East Men's Basketball Tournament was the postseason men's basketball tournament for the Big East Conference to be held March 11–14, 2026, at Madison Square Garden in New York City. The winner, St. John's, received the conference's automatic bid to the 2026 NCAA Tournament.

== Seeds ==
All 11 Big East schools are scheduled to participate in the tournament. Teams will be seeded by the conference record with tie-breaking procedures to determine the seeds for teams with identical conference records. The top five teams will receive first-round byes. Seeding for the tournament will be determined at the close of the regular conference season.

Seed	School	Conference	Tiebreaker
1	St. John's	18–2	
2	UConn	17–3	
3	Villanova	15–5	
4	Seton Hall	10–10	
5	Creighton	9–11	
6	DePaul	8–12	
7	Marquette	7–13	3–1 vs. Butler/Providence
8	Butler	7–13	2–2 vs. Marquette/Providence
9	Providence	7–13	1–3 vs. Marquette/Butler
10	Xavier	6–14	2–0 vs. Georgetown
11	Georgetown	6–14	0–2 vs. Xavier

== Schedule ==
Game	Time	Matchup	Score	Television	Attendance
First round – Wednesday, March 11
1	4:00 p.m.	No. 8 Butler vs. No. 9 Providence	81–91	Peacock/NBCSN	19,812
2	6:30 p.m.	No. 7 Marquette vs. No. 10 Xavier	87–89	Peacock/NBCSN	19,812
3	9:00 p.m.	No. 6 DePaul vs. No. 11 Georgetown	56–63	Peacock/NBCSN	19,812
Quarterfinals – Thursday, March 12
4	12:00 p.m.	No. 1 St. John's vs. No. 9 Providence	85–72	Peacock/NBCSN	19,812
5	2:30 p.m.	No. 4 Seton Hall vs. No. 5 Creighton	72–61	Peacock/NBCSN	19,812
6	7:00 p.m.	No. 2 UConn vs. No. 10 Xavier	93–68	FS1	19,812
7	9:30 p.m.	No. 3 Villanova vs. No. 11 Georgetown	64–78	FS1	19,812
Semifinals – Friday, March 13
8	5:30 p.m.	No. 1 St. John's vs. No. 4 Seton Hall	78–68	FOX	19,812
9	8:00 p.m.	No. 2 UConn vs. No. 11 Georgetown	67–51	FS1	19,812
Championship – Saturday, March 14
10	6:30 p.m.	No. 1 St. John's vs. No. 2 UConn	72–52	FOX	19,812
Game times in Eastern Time. Rankings denote tournament seed.

== Bracket ==
First round Wednesday, March 11; Peacock/NBCSN
8	Butler	81
9	Providence	91
7	Marquette	87
10	Xavier	89
6	DePaul	56
11	Georgetown	63

Quarterfinals; Thursday, March 12; Peacock/NBCSN/FS1
1	13 St. John's	85
9	Providence	72
4	Seton Hall	72
5	Creighton	61
2	6 UConn	93
10	Xavier	68
3	Villanova	64
11	Georgetown	78

Semifinals; Friday, March 13; FOX/FS1
1	13 St. John's	78
4	Seton Hall	68
2	6 UConn	67
11	Georgetown	51

Championship; Saturday, March 14; FOX
1	13 St. John's	72
2	6 UConn	52

== Awards and Honors ==
=== All-Tournament Team ===
Name	Pos.	Height	Weight	Year	Team
Bryce Hopkins	G/F	6'7"	225	Gr.	St. John's
Dillon Mitchell	F	6'8"	210	Sr.	St. John's
Tarris Reed Jr.	C	6'11"	265	Sr.	Connecticut
Alex Karaban	F	6'8"	230	RS Sr.	Connecticut
Budd Clark	G	5'10"	165	Jr.	Seton Hall

=== Dave Gavitt Trophy (Most Outstanding Player) ===
Name	Pos.	Height	Weight	Year	Team
Zuby Ejiofor	F	6'9"	245	Sr.	St. John's
