= 2025–26 Marquette Golden Eagles men's basketball team =

American college basketball season

2025–26 Marquette Golden Eagles men's basketball
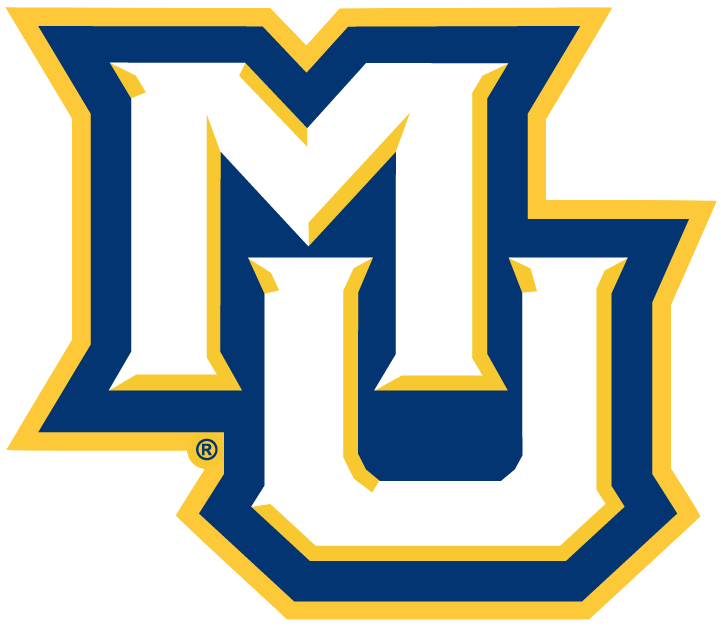
- Conference: Big East Conference
- Record: 12–20 (7–13 Big East)
- Head coach: Shaka Smart (5th season)
- Assistant coaches: Neill Berry (5th season); Cody Hatt (5th season); DeAndre Haynes (5th season); C.J. Rivers (2nd season); Nevada Smith (3rd season)
- Home arena: Fiserv Forum (Capacity: 17,341)

2025–26 Big East men's basketball standings
	Conf.				Overall
Team	W		L	PCT	W		L	PCT
No. 10 St. John's †	18	–	2	.900	30	–	7	.811
No. 2 UConn	17	–	3	.850	34	–	6	.850
Villanova	15	–	5	.750	24	–	9	.727
Seton Hall	10	–	10	.500	21	–	12	.636
Creighton	9	–	11	.450	16	–	18	.471
DePaul	8	–	12	.400	16	–	16	.500
Marquette	7	–	13	.350	12	–	20	.375
Butler	7	–	13	.350	16	–	16	.500
Providence	7	–	13	.350	15	–	18	.455
Xavier	6	–	14	.300	15	–	18	.455
Georgetown	6	–	14	.300	16	–	18	.471
† 2026 Big East tournament winner Rankings from AP poll

The 2025–26 Marquette Golden Eagles men's basketball team represented Marquette University during the 2025–26 NCAA Division I men's basketball season. The Golden Eagles, led by fifth-year head coach Shaka Smart, played their home games at Fiserv Forum in Milwaukee, Wisconsin as a member of the Big East Conference.

== Previous season ==
The Golden Eagles finished the 2024–25 season 23–11, 13–7 in Big East play to finish in tie for fourth place. As a No. 5 seed in the Big East tournament they defeated Xavier in the quarterfinals before falling to St. John's in the semifinals. They received an at-large bid to the NCAA tournament as the No. 7 seed in the South region, where they were defeated in the first round by New Mexico.

== Offseason ==
=== Departures ===
Name	Number	Pos.	Height	Weight	Year	Hometown	Reason for departure
Kam Jones	1	G	6'5"	200	Senior	Cordova, TN	Graduated/2025 NBA draft; selected 38th overall by San Antonio Spurs
Stevie Mitchell	4	G	6'3"	200	Senior	Reading, PA	Graduated
Al Amadou	21	F	6'9"	210	Sophomore	Philadelphia, PA	Transferred to Saint Joseph's
David Joplin	23	F	6'8"	225	Senior	Brookfield, WI	Graduated
Jack Anderson	25	G	6'4"	200	Senior	Davie, FL	Walk-on; Graduated
Luke Jacobson	42	F	6'7"	215	Freshman	San Luis Obispo, CA	Walk-on; Transferred to Vanguard
Jake Ciardo	54	G	6'2"	175	Senior	Germantown, WI	Walk-on; Graduated
Cameron Brown	55	G	6'1"	215	Senior	Plano, TX	Graduated

=== Incoming transfers ===
Marquette made no transfer portal additions, a trend that has continued under Shaka Smart.

=== 2025 recruiting class ===
College recruiting
Name	Hometown	School	Height	Weight	Commit date
Nigel James Jr. PG	Ashburnham, MA	Long Island Lutheran High School	6 ft 0 in (1.83 m)	186 lb (84 kg)	Jul 16, 2024
Nigel James Jr. PG	Recruit ratings: Rivals: 247Sports: ESPN: (82)				
Michael Phillips; SG	Raleigh, NC	Grace Christian School	6 ft 7 in (2.01 m)	175 lb (79 kg)	Aug 6, 2024
Michael Phillips; SG	Recruit ratings: Rivals: 247Sports: ESPN: (82)				
Sheek Pearson; C	St. Louis, MO	John Burroughs School	6 ft 10 in (2.08 m)	220 lb (100 kg)	May 25, 2025
Sheek Pearson; C	Recruit ratings: Rivals: 247Sports: ESPN: (82)				
Adrien Stevens; SG	Potomac, MD	Bullis School	6 ft 4 in (1.93 m)	195 lb (88 kg)	Aug 13, 2024
Adrien Stevens; SG	Recruit ratings: Rivals: 247Sports: ESPN: (81)				
Ian Miletic; SF	Rolling Meadows, IL	Rolling Meadows High School	6 ft 7 in (2.01 m)	180 lb (82 kg)	Jun 12, 2024
Ian Miletic; SF	Recruit ratings: Rivals: 247Sports: ESPN: (79)				
Overall recruit ranking: Rivals: 14 247Sports: 23 ESPN: 17
Note: In many cases, Scout, Rivals, 247Sports, On3, and ESPN may conflict in their listings of height and weight.; In these cases, the average was taken. ESPN grades are on a 100-point scale.; Sources: "2025 Marquette Basketball Commitments". Rivals.; "2025 Team Ranking". Rivals.

== Roster ==
2025–26 Marquette Golden Eagles men's basketball team
Players
Coaches

Pos.	#	Name	Height	Weight	Year	Previous school	Hometown
G	0	Nigel James Jr.	6 ft 0 in (1.83 m)	190 lb (86 kg)	Fr	Long Island Lutheran HS	Huntington, NY
G	2	Chase Ross	6 ft 5 in (1.96 m)	210 lb (95 kg)	Sr	Cushing Academy	Dallas, TX
G	5	Tre Norman	6 ft 4 in (1.93 m)	205 lb (93 kg)	Jr	Worcester Academy	Boston, MA
F	6	Sheek Pearson	6 ft 11 in (2.11 m)	205 lb (93 kg)	Fr	John Burroughs School	St. Louis, MO
G	7	Zaide Lowery	6 ft 5 in (1.96 m)	205 lb (93 kg)	Jr	La Lumiere School	Springfield, MO
F	8	Joshua Clark	7 ft 1 in (2.16 m)	240 lb (109 kg)	So	Clements HS	Virginia Beach, VA
F	9	Damarius Owens	6 ft 7 in (2.01 m)	205 lb (93 kg)	So	Western Reserve Academy	Rochester, NY
G	10	Adrien Stevens	6 ft 4 in (1.93 m)	201 lb (91 kg)	Fr	Bullis School	Potomac, MD
F	12	Ben Gold	6 ft 11 in (2.11 m)	235 lb (107 kg)	Sr	NBA Global Academy	Wellington, New Zealand
F	13	Royce Parham	6 ft 8 in (2.03 m)	230 lb (104 kg)	So	Western Reserve Academy	Pittsburgh, PA
F	18	Caedin Hamilton	6 ft 9 in (2.06 m)	245 lb (111 kg)	RS So	St. Joseph HS	Santa Maria, CA
F	21	Ian Miletic	6 ft 7 in (2.01 m)	200 lb (91 kg)	Fr	Rolling Meadows HS	Rolling Meadows, IL
G	22	Sean Jones	5 ft 10 in (1.78 m)	185 lb (84 kg)	RS Jr	Lincoln HS	Columbus, OH
F	35	Michael Phillips II	6 ft 6 in (1.98 m)	200 lb (91 kg)	Fr	Grace Christian School	Raleigh, NC
G	40	Casey O'Malley (W)	6 ft 3 in (1.91 m)	200 lb (91 kg)	Sr	Creighton Prep	Omaha, NE
G	41	Jonah Lucas (W)	6 ft 1 in (1.85 m)	180 lb (82 kg)	Sr	Harrison HS	West Lafayette, IN
F	42	Braeden Brenn (W)	6 ft 8 in (2.03 m)	240 lb (109 kg)	Fr	St. Mary Catholic HS	Appleton, WI

Head coach

- Shaka Smart (Kenyon)

Assistant coach(es)

- Neill Berry (Southeastern Louisiana)
- Cody Hatt (Norwich)
- DeAndre Haynes (Kent State)
- C.J. Rivers (Drake)
- Nevada Smith (Bethany (WV))

Legend

- (C) Team captain
- (S) Suspended
- (I) Ineligible
- (W) Walk-on
- Injured
- Current redshirt

Roster

== Schedule and results ==
Date time, TV	Rank^{#}	Opponent^{#}	Result	Record	High points	High rebounds	High assists	Site (attendance) city, state
Non-conference regular season
November 3, 2025*; 7:00 p.m., ESPN+		Albany	W 80–53	1–0	15 – Ross	8 – Gold	5 – Ross	Fiserv Forum (13,168); Milwaukee, WI
November 5, 2025*; 7:00 p.m., ESPN+		Southern	W 100–82	2–0	23 – Ross	9 – Gold	6 – Ross	Fiserv Forum (13,002); Milwaukee, WI
November 9, 2025*; 12:00 p.m., ESPN		vs. Indiana; Waterkeeper Alliance Invitational	L 77–100	2–1	19 – Ross	8 – Gold	3 – Tied	United Center (14,017); Chicago, IL
November 12, 2025*; 7:00 p.m., ESPN+		Little Rock	W 89–49	3–1	16 – Ross	9 – Gold	5 – Hamilton	Fiserv Forum (13,358); Milwaukee, WI
November 15, 2025*; 1:00 p.m., Peacock		Maryland	L 82–89	3–2	31 – Ross	8 – Tied	4 – Tied	Fiserv Forum (15,586); Milwaukee, WI
November 19, 2025*; 6:30 p.m., TruTV		Dayton	L 71–77 ^{OT}	3–3	18 – James Jr.	8 – Gold	5 – James Jr.	Fiserv Forum (14,369); Milwaukee, WI
November 22, 2025*; 1:00 p.m., TruTV		Central Michigan	W 85–71	4–3	27 – Ross	6 – Gold	7 – Ross	Fiserv Forum (14,034); Milwaukee, WI
November 28, 2025*; 1:00 p.m., NBC		vs. Oklahoma; The Bad Boy Mowers Series - Chicago	L 74–75	4–4	21 – Ross	7 – Gold	4 – James Jr.	Credit Union 1 Arena (2,587); Chicago, IL
December 2, 2025*; 7:00 p.m., ESPN+		Valparaiso	W 75–72 ^{OT}	5–4	21 – James Jr.	10 – Hamilton	5 – James Jr.	Fiserv Forum (13,486); Milwaukee, WI
December 6, 2025*; 1:00 p.m., FS1		at Wisconsin; Rivalry	L 76–96	5–5	15 – Stevens	6 – James Jr.	6 – Jones	Kohl Center (16,838); Madison, WI
December 13, 2025*; 1:00 p.m., Peacock/NBCSN		at No. 6 Purdue	L 59–79	5–6	19 – Parham	5 – Gold	5 – Jones	Mackey Arena (14,876); West Lafayette, IN
Big East regular season
December 17, 2025; 7:40 p.m., FS1		Georgetown	L 69–78	5–7 (0–1)	15 – Owens	7 – Owens	5 – James Jr.	Fiserv Forum (14,038); Milwaukee, WI
December 20, 2025; 7:30 p.m., Peacock/NBCSN		at Creighton	L 63–84	5–8 (0–2)	23 – James	7 – Owens	3 – Tied	CHI Health Center Omaha (16,507); Omaha, NE
December 30, 2025; 6:00 p.m., FS1		Seton Hall	L 73–79	5–9 (0–3)	19 – Gold	8 – Parham	5 – James Jr.	Fiserv Forum (15,028); Milwaukee, WI
January 4, 2026; 1:00 p.m., NBC		at No. 4 UConn	L 57–73	5–10 (0–4)	15 – James Jr.	11 – Gold	3 – James Jr.	Gampel Pavilion (10,299); Storrs, CT
January 7, 2026; 6:00 p.m., FS1		Xavier	W 66–65	6–10 (1–4)	14 – Parham	9 – Ross	6 – James Jr.	Fiserv Forum (14,020); Milwaukee, WI
January 10, 2026; 1:30 p.m., TNT/TruTV		Villanova	L 73–76	6–11 (1–5)	31 – James Jr.	4 – Tied	6 – James Jr.	Fiserv Forum (15,342); Milwaukee, WI
January 13, 2026; 5:30 p.m., Peacock		at St. John's	L 68–92	6–12 (1–6)	20 – Ross	6 – Phillips II	4 – James Jr.	Madison Square Garden (13,470); New York, NY
January 16, 2026; 7:30 p.m., FS1		at DePaul	L 75–80	6–13 (1–7)	18 – James Jr.	7 – Hamilton	8 – James Jr.	Wintrust Arena (7,474); Chicago, IL
January 19, 2026; 5:00 p.m., FS1		Providence	W 105–104 ^{OT}	7–13 (2–7)	38 – James Jr.	6 – Owens	8 – James Jr.	Fiserv Forum (13,881); Milwaukee, WI
January 23, 2026; 7:00 p.m., FS1		at Butler	L 76–87	7–14 (2–8)	15 – Tied	5 – Tied	8 – James Jr.	Hinkle Fieldhouse (8,033); Indianapolis, IN
January 27, 2026; 8:30 p.m., TNT/TruTV		Creighton	W 86–62	8–14 (3–8)	21 – James Jr.	7 – Parham	7 – James Jr.	Fiserv Forum (14,115); Milwaukee, WI
January 31, 2026; 11:00 a.m., Peacock		at Seton Hall	L 64–69	8–15 (3–9)	17 – Parham	5 – Tied	5 – Stevens	Walsh Gymnasium (8,131); South Orange, NJ
February 7, 2026; 1:00 p.m., FS1		Butler; National Marquette Day	W 70–55	9–15 (4–9)	19 – Ross	10 – Gold	5 – Ross	Fiserv Forum (17,568); Milwaukee, WI
February 10, 2026; 6:30 p.m., TNT/TruTV		at Villanova	L 74–77	9–16 (4–10)	26 – Parham	11 – Parham	6 – James Jr.	Finneran Pavilion (6,501); Villanova, PA
February 14, 2026; 2:00 p.m., TNT/TruTV		at Xavier	L 88–96	9–17 (4–11)	30 – James Jr.	10 – Parham	12 – James Jr.	Cintas Center (9,924); Cincinnati, OH
February 18, 2026; 8:00 p.m., TNT		No. 17 St. John's	L 70–76	9–18 (4–12)	25 – James Jr.	10 – Gold	4 – Ross	Fiserv Forum (14,389); Milwaukee, WI
February 24, 2026; 6:00 p.m., Peacock		at Georgetown	W 76–60	10–18 (5–12)	20 – James Jr.	12 – Gold	6 – James Jr.	Capital One Arena (4,519); Washington, DC
March 1, 2026; 3:00 p.m., FS1		DePaul	L 51–62	10–19 (5–13)	14 – James Jr.	7 – James Jr.	3 – James Jr.	Fiserv Forum (14,582); Milwaukee, WI
March 4, 2026; 6:00 p.m., Peacock		at Providence	W 78–56	11–19 (6–13)	21 – Stevens	7 – James Jr.	3 – Hamilton	Amica Mutual Pavilion (11,426); Providence, RI
March 7, 2026; 11:30 a.m., FOX		No. 4 UConn	W 68–62	12–19 (7–13)	19 – James Jr.	5 – Ross	7 – James Jr.	Fiserv Forum (16,283); Milwaukee, WI
Big East tournament
March 11, 2026; 5:30 p.m., Peacock/NBCSN	(7)	vs. (10) Xavier; First round	L 87–89	12–20	22 – Parham	11 – Gold	7 – James Jr.	Madison Square Garden (19,812); New York, NY
*Non-conference game. ^{#}Rankings from AP Poll. (#) Tournament seedings in parentheses. All times are in Central Time.
