= Kareem Abdul-Jabbar Award =

Annual award for the best center in NCAA Division I men's basketball

- Awarded for: the nation's top male center in NCAA basketball
- Country: United States
- Presented by: Naismith Memorial Basketball Hall of Fame

History
- First award: 2015
- Most recent: Zuby Ejiofor, St. John's
- Website: Official website

The Kareem Abdul-Jabbar Center of the Year Award is an annual basketball award given by the Naismith Memorial Basketball Hall of Fame to the top men's collegiate center. Following the success of the Bob Cousy Award which had been awarded since 2004, the award was one of four new awards (along with the Jerry West Award, Julius Erving Award and Karl Malone Award) created as part of the inaugural College Basketball Awards show in 2015. It is named after Kareem Abdul-Jabbar, a Naismith Memorial Basketball Hall of Fame inductee who played the position. The inaugural winner was Frank Kaminsky of Wisconsin.

== Key ==
*	Awarded a national player of the year award that same season: Sporting News; Oscar Robertson Trophy; Associated Press; NABC; Naismith; Wooden
Player (X)	Denotes the number of times the player has been awarded the Kareem Abdul-Jabbar at that point

== Winners ==
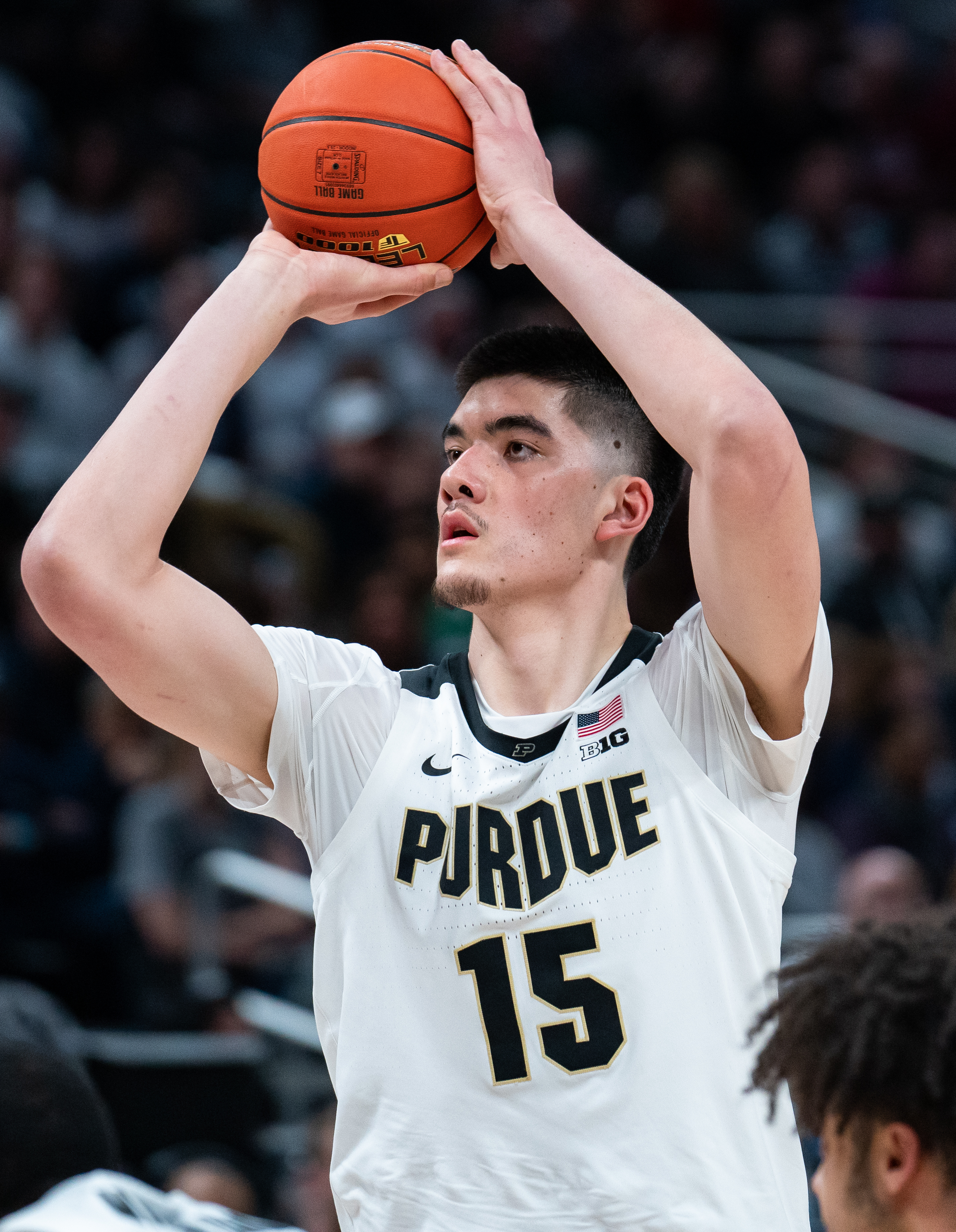
Zach Edey, Purdue, 2024

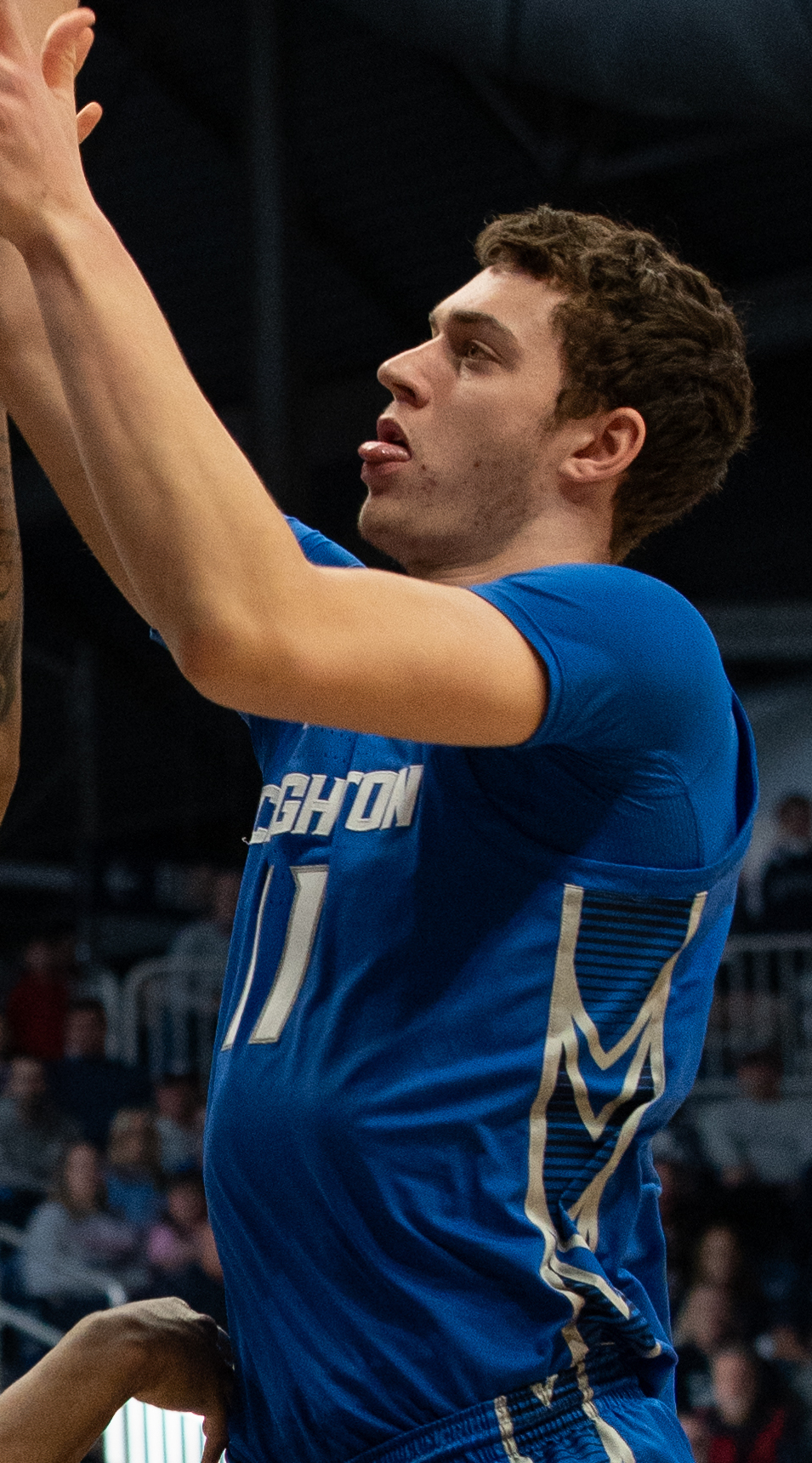
Ryan Kalkbrenner, Creighton, 2025

Season	Player	School	Class	Reference
2014–15	Frank Kaminsky*	Wisconsin	Senior	
2015–16	Jakob Pöltl	Utah	Sophomore	
2016–17	Przemek Karnowski	Gonzaga	Senior	
2017–18	Ángel Delgado	Seton Hall	Senior	
2018–19	Ethan Happ	Wisconsin	Senior	
2019–20	Luka Garza	Iowa	Junior	
2020–21	Luka Garza* (2)	Iowa	Senior	
2021–22	Oscar Tshiebwe*	Kentucky	Junior	
2022–23	Zach Edey*	Purdue	Junior	
2023–24	Zach Edey* (2)	Purdue	Senior	
2024–25	Ryan Kalkbrenner	Creighton	Senior	
2025–26	Zuby Ejiofor	St. John's	Senior	
