= 2025–26 Providence Friars men's basketball team =

American college basketball season

2025–26 Providence Friars men's basketball
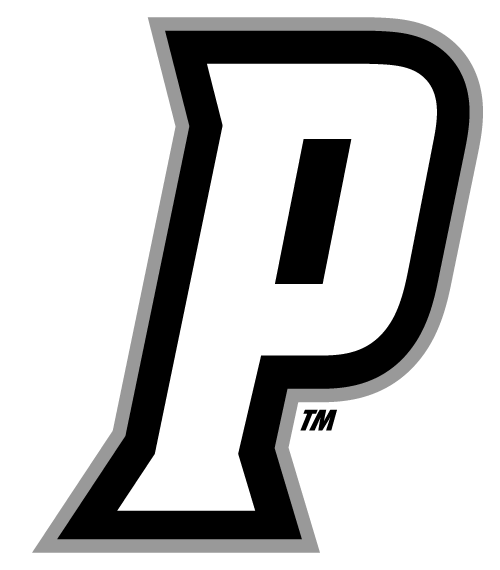
- Conference: Big East Conference
- Record: 15–18 (7–13 Big East)
- Head coach: Kim English (3rd season)
- Assistant coaches: Dennis Felton (3rd season); Bryan Tibaldi (1st season); Matt Palumbo (2nd season); Corey Wright Jr. (2nd season); Ryan Gomes (1st season)
- Home arena: Amica Mutual Pavilion

2025–26 Big East men's basketball standings
	Conf.				Overall
Team	W		L	PCT	W		L	PCT
No. 10 St. John's †	18	–	2	.900	30	–	7	.811
No. 2 UConn	17	–	3	.850	34	–	6	.850
Villanova	15	–	5	.750	24	–	9	.727
Seton Hall	10	–	10	.500	21	–	12	.636
Creighton	9	–	11	.450	16	–	18	.471
DePaul	8	–	12	.400	16	–	16	.500
Marquette	7	–	13	.350	12	–	20	.375
Butler	7	–	13	.350	16	–	16	.500
Providence	7	–	13	.350	15	–	18	.455
Xavier	6	–	14	.300	15	–	18	.455
Georgetown	6	–	14	.300	16	–	18	.471
† 2026 Big East tournament winner Rankings from AP poll

The 2025–26 Providence Friars men's basketball team represented Providence College during the 2025–26 NCAA Division I men's basketball season. The team was led by 3rd-year head coach Kim English and played their home games at Amica Mutual Pavilion in Providence, Rhode Island as a member of the Big East Conference.

== Previous season ==
The Friars finished the 2024–25 season 12–20, 6–14 in Big East play to finish in a tie for eighth place. As No. 8 seed in the Big East tournament they lost in the first round to Butler. This was the Friars' worst season since the 1984-85 season.

== Offseason ==
=== Departures ===
Name	Number	Pos.	Height	Weight	Year	Hometown	Reason for departure
Wesley Cardet Jr.	0	G	6'6"	210	Senior	Tallahassee, FL	Transferred
Jayden Pierre	1	G	6'2"	182	Junior	Elizabeth, NJ	Transferred to TCU
Christ Essandoko	2	C	7'0"	290	(redshirt) Sophomore	Paris, France	Transferred to South Carolina
Jabri Abdur-Rahim	3	G	6'8"	220	Graduate Student	South Orange, NJ	Transferred
Justyn Fernandez	4	G	6'5"	205	(redshirt) Sophomore	Richmond, VA	Transferred to Delaware
Anton Bonke	5	C	7'2"	270	Sophomore	Port Vila, Vanuatu	Transferred to Charlotte
Bensley Joseph	7	G	6'1"	188	Senior	Arlington, MA	Graduated
Eli DeLaurier	12	F	6'10"	225	(redshirt) Freshman	Shipman, VA	Transferred to East Carolina
Bryce Hopkins	23	G/F	6'7"	220	Senior	Oak Park, IL	Transferred to St. John's
Luke Fonts	24	G	6'1"	190	Senior	Portsmouth, RI	Walk-on; graduated
Kieran O'Haire	33	G	6'2"	195	Senior	Menands, NY	Walk-on; graduated

=== Incoming transfers ===
Name	Number	Pos.	Height	Weight	Year	Hometown	Previous school
Jason Edwards	1	G	6'1"	175	(redshirt) Senior	Atlanta, GA	Vanderbilt
Jaylin Sellers	2	G	6'4"	205	Graduate Student	Columbus, GA	UCF
Daquan Davis	3	G	6'1"	176	Sophomore	Baltimore, MD	Florida State
Cole Hargrove	13	F	6'8"	235	Senior	Norristown, PA	Drexel
Duncan Powell	31	F	6'8"	235	Graduate Student	Dallas, TX	Georgia Tech

=== Recruiting classes ===
==== 2025 recruiting class ====
College recruiting information
Name	Hometown	School	Height	Weight	Commit date
Jamier Jones #15 SF	Sarasota, FL	Oak Ridge High School	6 ft 6 in (1.98 m)	220 lb (100 kg)	May 12, 2024
Jamier Jones #15 SF	Recruit ratings: Rivals: 247Sports: ESPN: (86)				
Jaylen Harrell #24 SF	Needham, MA	Saint Sebastians Country Day School	6 ft 6 in (1.98 m)	190 lb (86 kg)	Jul 1, 2024
Jaylen Harrell #24 SF	Recruit ratings: Rivals: 247Sports: ESPN: (82)				
Stefan Vaaks; SG	Tabasalu, Estonia	Audentes e–Gymnasium	6 ft 7 in (2.01 m)	206 lb (93 kg)	Apr 4, 2025
Stefan Vaaks; SG	Recruit ratings: Rivals: 247Sports: ESPN: (NR)				
Overall recruit ranking:
Note: In many cases, Scout, Rivals, 247Sports, On3, and ESPN may conflict in their listings of height and weight.; In these cases, the average was taken. ESPN grades are on a 100-point scale.; Sources: "2025 Team Ranking". Rivals.

== Roster ==
2025–26 Providence Friars men's basketball team
Players
Coaches

Pos.	#	Name	Height	Weight	Year	Previous school	Hometown
G	1	Jason Edwards	6 ft 1 in (1.85 m)	180 lb (82 kg)	RS Sr	Parkview High School; Vanderbilt	Atlanta, Georgia
G	2	Jaylin Sellers	6 ft 5 in (1.96 m)	205 lb (93 kg)	GS	Spencer High School; UCF	Columbus, Georgia
G	3	Daquan Davis	6 ft 1 in (1.85 m)	185 lb (84 kg)	So	St. John's College High School; Florida State	Baltimore, MD
G/F	4	Jaylen Harrell	6 ft 5 in (1.96 m)	210 lb (95 kg)	Fr	Cambridge Academy for Science and Technology (CATS)	Boston, Massachusetts
F	5	Jamier James	6 ft 6 in (1.98 m)	218 lb (99 kg)	Fr	Oak Ridge High School	Sarasota, Florida
G	7	Stefan Vaaks	6 ft 6 in (1.98 m)	206 lb (93 kg)	Fr	Audentese E-Gümnaasium	Tabasalu, Estonia
G	8	Jack Williams (W)	6 ft 4 in (1.93 m)	195 lb (88 kg)	GS	Ann Arbor High School	Ann Arbor, Michigan
G/F	10	Rich Barron	6 ft 5 in (1.96 m)	225 lb (102 kg)	Jr	St. Ignatius	Chicago, Illinois
F	11	Ryan Mela	6 ft 7 in (2.01 m)	205 lb (93 kg)	So	Newman School	Natick, Massachusetts
F	13	Cole Hargrove	6 ft 8 in (2.03 m)	245 lb (111 kg)	Sr	Methacton High School; Drexel	Norristown, PA
G	14	Corey Floyd Jr.	6 ft 4 in (1.93 m)	208 lb (94 kg)	RS Sr	Roselle Catholic High School; UConn	Franklin, New Jersey
F	17	Peteris Pinnis	7 ft 0 in (2.13 m)	260 lb (118 kg)	So	Riga French Lycée	Salaspils, Latvia
G	20	Nilavan Jotham Daniels (W)	6 ft 3 in (1.91 m)	180 lb (82 kg)	So	Link Year Prep	St. Louis, Missouri
F	31	Duncan Powell	6 ft 8 in (2.03 m)	240 lb (109 kg)	GS	DeSoto High School; Georgia Tech	Dallas, Texas
F	55	Oswin Erhunmwunse	6 ft 10 in (2.08 m)	235 lb (107 kg)	So	Putnam Science Academy (CT)	Benin City, Nigeria

Head coach

- Kim English (Missouri)

Assistant coach(es)

- Dennis Felton (Howard)
- Bryan Tibaldi (Michigan State)
- Matt Palumbo (Virginia)
- Corey Wright Jr. (Providence)
- Ryan Gomes (Providence)

Legend

- (C) Team captain
- (S) Suspended
- (I) Ineligible
- (W) Walk-on
- Injured
- Current redshirt

Roster

== Schedule and results ==
Date time, TV	Rank^{#}	Opponent^{#}	Result	Record	High points	High rebounds	High assists	Site (attendance) city, state
Exhibition
October 19, 2025*; 3:00 p.m.		at Pittsburgh	L 74–81		19 – Edwards	10 – Powell	3 – Vaaks	Petersen Events Center; Pittsburgh, PA
October 25, 2025*; 4:00 p.m.		Harvard	W 85–77		16 – Edwards	9 – Erhunmwunse	3 – Tied	Amica Mutual Pavilion (2,875); Providence, RI
Non-conference regular season
November 3, 2025*; 7:15 p.m., ESPN+		Holy Cross	W 89–79	1–0	19 – Vaaks	8 – Erhunmwunse	3 – Tied	Amica Mutual Pavilion (9,083); Providence, RI
November 8, 2025*; 4:00 p.m., Peacock		vs. Virginia Tech; Hall of Fame Tip-Off	L 101–107	1–1	28 – Edwards	11 – Erhunmwunse	4 – Edwards	Mohegan Sun Arena; Uncasville, CT
November 11, 2025*; 7:00 p.m., ESPN+		Penn	W 106–81	2–1	20 – Floyd	12 – Mela	5 – Tied	Amica Mutual Pavilion (9,472); Providence, RI
November 14, 2025*; 9:00 p.m., ESPN+		at Colorado	L 88–97	2–2	24 – Edwards	7 – Sellers	6 – Edwards	CU Events Center (6,596); Boulder, CO
November 18, 2025*; 7:00 p.m., ESPN+		New Hampshire	W 98–66	3–2	25 – Edwards	11 – Erhunmwunse	8 – Edwards	Amica Mutual Pavilion (8,852); Providence, RI
November 22, 2025*; 4:00 p.m., TruTV		vs. Penn State; Hall of Fame Showcase	W 77–65	4–2	15 – Vaaks	9 – Mela	5 – Tied	Mohegan Sun Arena (6,456); Uncasville, CT
November 27, 2025*; 5:30 p.m., FS1		vs. Wisconsin; Rady Children's Invitational Semifinals	L 83–104	4–3	20 – Edwards	7 – Tied	4 – Vaaks	Jenny Craig Pavilion (4,955); San Diego, CA
November 28, 2025*; 3:00 p.m., FOX		vs. No. 10 Florida; Rady Children's Invitational 3rd Place Game	L 78–90	4–4	17 – Mela	8 – Mela	3 – Mela	Jenny Craig Pavilion; San Diego, CA
December 2, 2025*; 7:00 p.m., ESPN+		Fairleigh Dickinson	W 94–64	5–4	24 – Edwards	4 – Tied	10 – Vaaks	Amica Mutual Pavilion (6,285); Providence, RI
December 6, 2025*; 12:00 p.m., TruTV		Rhode Island; Ocean State Rivalry	W 90–71	6–4	18 – Tied	10 – Sellers	4 – Vaaks	Amica Mutual Pavilion (11,924); Providence, RI
December 9, 2025*; 7:30 p.m., TruTV		Brown	W 86–79	7–4	16 – Tied	8 – Floyd	4 – Tied	Amica Mutual Pavilion (8,123); Providence, RI
Big East regular season
December 13, 2025; 2:00 p.m., TNT/TruTV		at Butler	L 110–113 ^{2OT}	7–5 (0–1)	32 – Edwards	10 – Erhunmwunse	6 – Edwards	Hinkle Fieldhouse (7,321); Indianapolis, IN
December 19, 2025; 6:30 p.m., FS1		Seton Hall	L 67–72	7–6 (0–2)	15 – Vaaks	4 – Tied	5 – Edwards	Amica Mutual Pavilion (10,993); Providence, RI
January 3, 2026; 12:00 p.m., FOX		at St. John's	W 77–71	8–6 (1–2)	16 – Vaaks	10 – Jones	2 – Tied	Madison Square Garden (19,047); New York, NY
January 7, 2026; 7:00 p.m., Peacock		No. 4 UConn	L 98–103 ^{OT}	8–7 (1–3)	19 – Mela	7 – Erhunmwunse	4 – Tied	Amica Mutual Pavilion (11,789); Providence, RI
January 10, 2026; 4:00 p.m., FS1		at Xavier	L 84–97	8–8 (1–4)	16 – Edwards	7 – Tied	5 – Floyd Jr.	Cintas Center (9,693); Cincinnati, OH
January 13, 2026; 6:30 p.m., FS1		Villanova	L 82–88	8–9 (1–5)	24 – Sellers	7 – Floyd Jr.	3 – Tied	Amica Mutual Pavilion (11,476); Providence, RI
January 16, 2026; 6:30 p.m., FS1		Creighton	W 93–88	9–9 (2–5)	24 – Vaaks	13 – Erhunmwunse	7 – Vaaks	Amica Mutual Pavilion (11,655); Providence, RI
January 19, 2026; 6:00 p.m., FS1		at Marquette	L 104–105 ^{OT}	9–10 (2–6)	27 – Sellers	15 – Erhunmwunse	5 – Sellers	Fiserv Forum (13,881); Milwaukee, WI
January 24, 2026; 12:30 p.m., TNT		Georgetown	L 78–81	9–11 (2–7)	18 – Sellers	10 – Erhunmwunse	4 – Tied	Amica Mutual Pavilion (12,304); Providence, RI
January 27, 2026; 7:30 p.m., TNT/TruTV		at No. 2 UConn	L 81–87	9–12 (2–8)	20 – Jones	10 – Erhunmwunse	4 – Jones	Gampel Pavilion (10,244); Storrs, CT
January 30, 2026; 7:00 p.m., FS1		at Villanova	L 73–87	9–13 (2–9)	25 – Vaaks	12 – Erhunmwunse	4 – Vaaks	Finneran Pavilion (6,501); Villanova, PA
February 4, 2026; 7:00 p.m., Peacock		Butler	W 97–87 ^{2OT}	10–13 (3–9)	36 – Sellers	10 – Tied	3 – Vaaks	Amica Mutual Pavilion (8,152); Providence, RI
February 7, 2026; 4:00 p.m., FS1		DePaul	W 90–72	11–13 (4–9)	25 – Edwards	13 – Erhunmwunse	5 – Floyd Jr.	Amica Mutual Pavilion (12,023); Providence, RI
February 11, 2026; 7:30 p.m., Peacock		at Seton Hall	L 80–87	11–14 (4–10)	23 – Sellers	8 – Erhunmwunse	4 – Sellers	Prudential Center (7,590); Newark, NJ
February 14, 2026; 1:00 p.m., TNT/TruTV		No. 17 St. John's	L 69–79	11–15 (4–11)	20 – Vaaks	9 – Mela	3 – Tied	Amica Mutual Pavilion (11,714); Providence, RI
February 21, 2026; 8:00 p.m., FS1		at DePaul	W 71–68	12–15 (5–11)	21 – Sellers	12 – Erhunmwunse	6 – Edwards	Wintrust Arena (5,895); Chicago, IL
February 25, 2026; 7:30 p.m., TruTV		Xavier	W 94–84	13–15 (6–11)	27 – Sellers	10 – Erhunmwunse	3 – Edwards	Amica Mutual Pavilion (8,069); Providence, RI
February 28, 2026; 5:30 p.m., TNT/TruTV		at Creighton	W 79–76	14–15 (7–11)	27 – Sellers	11 – Erhunmwunse	4 – Edwards	CHI Health Center Omaha (17,115); Omaha, NE
March 4, 2026; 7:00 p.m., Peacock		Marquette	L 56–78	14–16 (7–12)	18 – Sellers	8 – Erhunmwunse	3 – Vaaks	Amica Mutual Pavilion; Providence, RI
March 7, 2026; 8:00 p.m., TruTV		at Georgetown	L 79–80	14–17 (7–13)	21 – Sellers	11 – Erhunmwense	5 – Vaaks	Capital One Arena (6,308); Washington, D.C.
Big East tournament
March 11, 2026; 4:00 p.m., Peacock/NBCSN	(9)	vs. (8) Butler; First round	W 91–81	15–17	28 – Vaaks	9 – Mela	5 – Mela	Madison Square Garden (19,812); New York, NY
March 12, 2026; 12:00 p.m., Peacock/NBCSN	(9)	vs. (1) No. 13 St. John's; Quarterfinals	L 72–85	15–18	23 – Vaaks	6 – Tied	1 – Tied	Madison Square Garden (19,812); New York, NY
*Non-conference game. ^{#}Rankings from AP Poll. (#) Tournament seedings in parentheses. All times are in Eastern Time.
