= Dylan Darling =

American basketball player

No. 1 – Grand Canyon Antelopes
- Position: Point guard
- Conference: Mountain West Conference

Personal information
- Listed height: 6 ft 1 in (1.85 m)
- Listed weight: 180 lb (82 kg)

Career information
- High school: Central Valley (Spokane Valley, Washington)
- College: Washington State (2022–2024); Idaho State (2024–2025); St. John's (2025–2026); Grand Canyon (2026–present)

Career highlights
- Big Sky Player of the Year (2025); First-team All-Big Sky (2025); Big Sky Newcomer of the Year (2025)

Dylan James Darling is an American college basketball player for the Grand Canyon Antelopes of the Mountain West Conference. He previously played for the Washington State Cougars, Idaho State Bengals, and St. John's Red Storm.

== Early life ==
Darling grew up in Spokane, Washington and attended Central Valley High School. He was named the Greater Spokane League MVP as a senior after averaging 33.2 points, 8.5 rebounds, 5.8 assists and 4.4 steals per game. Darling committed to play college basketball at Washington State over offers from Idaho State and Seattle Pacific.

== College career ==
Darling began his college career at Washington State. He averaged 1.7 points in 25 games played as a freshman. Darling suffered a season-ending injury two games into his sophomore season and used a medical redshirt. After the end of the season, he entered the NCAA transfer portal.

Darling transferred to Idaho State. He was named the Big Sky Player of the Year in his first season with the Bengals.

On March 22, 2026, Darling hit a game-winning layup at the buzzer to send St. John's to the Sweet Sixteen of the 2026 NCAA Division I men's basketball tournament. Darling averaged 6.9 points, 2.6 assists and 2.5 rebounds per game as a junior.

== Personal life ==
Darling's father, James Darling, played college football at Washington State and in the National Football League for ten seasons.
