= 2025–26 Seton Hall Pirates men's basketball team =

American college basketball season

2025–26 Seton Hall Pirates men's basketball
- Conference: Big East Conference
- Record: 21–12 (10–10 Big East)
- Head coach: Shaheen Holloway (4th season)
- Assistant coaches: Rasheen Davis; Ryan Whalen; Corey Lowery; Andrew Francis
- Home arena: Prudential Center; Walsh Gymnasium

2025–26 Big East men's basketball standings
	Conf.				Overall
Team	W		L	PCT	W		L	PCT
No. 10 St. John's †	18	–	2	.900	30	–	7	.811
No. 2 UConn	17	–	3	.850	34	–	6	.850
Villanova	15	–	5	.750	24	–	9	.727
Seton Hall	10	–	10	.500	21	–	12	.636
Creighton	9	–	11	.450	16	–	18	.471
DePaul	8	–	12	.400	16	–	16	.500
Marquette	7	–	13	.350	12	–	20	.375
Butler	7	–	13	.350	16	–	16	.500
Providence	7	–	13	.350	15	–	18	.455
Xavier	6	–	14	.300	15	–	18	.455
Georgetown	6	–	14	.300	16	–	18	.471
† 2026 Big East tournament winner Rankings from AP poll

The 2025–26 Seton Hall Pirates men's basketball team represented Seton Hall University in the 2025–26 NCAA Division I men's basketball season. They are led by fourth-year head coach Shaheen Holloway. The Pirates played their home games at the Prudential Center in Newark, New Jersey, and Walsh Gymnasium in South Orange, New Jersey, as members of the Big East Conference.

Following the team's loss in the Big East tournament, they announced on March 15, 2026 that they would not participate in any postseason tournaments.

== Previous season ==
The Pirates finished the 2024–25 season a school worst 7–25, 2–18 in Big East play to finish in last place. They were defeated by Villanova in the first round of the Big East tournament.

== Offseason ==
=== Departures ===
Name	Number	Pos.	Height	Weight	Year	Hometown	Reason for departure
Dylan Addae-Wusu	0	G	6'4"	237	Graduate	The Bronx, New York	Graduated
Prince Aligbe	7	F	6'7"	228	Junior	Minneapolis, Minnesota	Transferred to Southern Illinois
Isaiah Coleman	21	G	6'5"	195	Sophomore	Fredericksburg, Virginia	Transferred to Oklahoma State
Garwey Dual	33	G	6'5"	205	Sophomore	Houston, Texas	Transferred to McNeese
Zion Harmon	1	G	6'0"	184	Junior	Temple Hills, Maryland	Transferred to Georgetown College
Chaunce Jenkins	2	G	6'4"	185	Graduate	Newport News, Virginia	Graduated
Scotty Middleton	7	F	6'7"	181	Sophomore	Miami, Florida	Transferred to Tulane
Emmanuel Okorafor	23	F	6'9"	225	Junior	Abia, Nigeria	Transferred to Wichita State
Yacine Toumi	9	F	6'10"	215	Graduate	Meudon, France	Graduate transferred to Hawaii
David Tubek	6	F	6'7"	220	Sophomore	Juba, South Sudan	Transferred to UTEP
Gus Yalden	19	F	6'9"	258	Sophomore	Appleton, Wisconsin	Transferred to Vermont

=== Incoming transfers ===
Name	Number	Pos.	Height	Weight	Year	Hometown	Previous school
Adam Clark	0	G	5'10"	165	Junior	Philadelphia, Pennsylvania	Merrimack
Jacob Dar	1	G/F	6'7"	190	Senior	Omaha, Nebraska	Rice
Elijah Fisher	22	G	6'6"	220	Senior	Toronto, Ontario, Canada	Pacific
Trey Parker	13	G	6'0"	180	Sophomore	Fayetteville, North Carolina	NC State
Stephon Payne	6	F	6'9"	235	Senior	Jacksonville, Florida	Jacksonville
Josh Rivera	7	F	6'6"	225	Senior	New Brunswick, New Jersey	Fordham
Tajuan Simpkins	2	G	6'4"	190	Junior	Brooklyn, New York	Elon
AJ Staton-McCray	14	G	6'4"	200	Senior	Delray Beach, Florida	Miami (FL)
Patrick Suemnick	9	F	6'8"	235	Graduate	Green Bay, Wisconsin	Oklahoma State
Mike Williams	23	G	6'3"	185	Junior	Baltimore, Maryland	LSU

==== 2025 recruiting class ====
College recruiting
Name	Hometown	School	Height	Weight	Commit date
Najai Hines #25 SG	Plainfield, NJ	Plainfield	6 ft 10 in (2.08 m)	265 lb (120 kg)	Jul 22, 2025
Najai Hines #25 SG	Recruit ratings: Scout: Rivals: 247Sports: ESPN: (83)				

==== 2026 recruiting class ====
College recruiting
Name	Hometown	School	Height	Weight	Commit date
Darien Moore #1 SG	Wolfeboro, NH	Brewster Academy	6 ft 2 in (1.88 m)	170 lb (77 kg)	Feb 6, 2024
Darien Moore #1 SG	Recruit ratings: Scout: Rivals: 247Sports: ESPN: (82)				

== Roster ==
2025–26 Seton Hall Pirates men's basketball team
Players
Coaches

Pos.	#	Name	Height	Weight	Year	Previous school	Hometown
G	0	Budd Clark	5 ft 10 in (1.78 m)	165 lb (75 kg)	Jr	Merrimack	Philadelphia, Pennsylvania
G/F	1	Jacob Dar	6 ft 7 in (2.01 m)	190 lb (86 kg)	Sr	Rice	Omaha, Nebraska
G	2	Tajuan Simpkins	6 ft 4 in (1.93 m)	190 lb (86 kg)	Jr	Elon	Brooklyn, New York
F	6	Stephon Payne	6 ft 9 in (2.06 m)	235 lb (107 kg)	Sr	Jacksonville	Jacksonville, Florida
F	7	Josh Rivera	6 ft 6 in (1.98 m)	225 lb (102 kg)	Sr	Fordham	New Brunswick, New Jersey
F	9	Patrick Suemnick	6 ft 8 in (2.03 m)	235 lb (107 kg)	GS	Oklahoma State	Green Bay, Wisconsin
G	13	Trey Parker	6 ft 0 in (1.83 m)	180 lb (82 kg)	So	NC State	Fayetteville, North Carolina
G	14	AJ Staton-McCray	6 ft 4 in (1.93 m)	200 lb (91 kg)	Sr	Miami	Delray Beach, Florida
G	15	Jasheem Felton (injured)	6 ft 5 in (1.96 m)	205 lb (93 kg)	So	Combine Academy (NC)	Charlotte, North Carolina
G	22	Elijah Fisher	6 ft 6 in (1.98 m)	220 lb (100 kg)	Sr	Pacific	Toronto, Ontario, Canada
G	23	Mike Williams	6 ft 3 in (1.91 m)	185 lb (84 kg)	Jr	LSU	Baltimore, Maryland
F	25	Najai Hines	6 ft 10 in (2.08 m)	265 lb (120 kg)	Fr	Plainfield High School (NJ)	Plainfield, New Jersey
C	35	Assane Mbaye	7 ft 2 in (2.18 m)	190 lb (86 kg)	So	The Patrick School (NJ)	M'Bour, Senegal
G	41	David Gabriel (W)	6 ft 1 in (1.85 m)	175 lb (79 kg)	Sr	North Bergen High School	North Bergen, New Jersey
C	54	Godswill Erheriene	6 ft 9 in (2.06 m)	225 lb (102 kg)	So	Long Island Lutheran (NY)	Ughelli, Nigeria

Head coach

- Shaheen Holloway (Seton Hall)

Assistant coach(es)

- Rasheen Davis (New Rochelle)
- Ryan Whalen (Saint Joseph's)
- Corey Lowery (Rutgers)
- Andrew Francis (Southampton)

Legend

- (C) Team captain
- (S) Suspended
- (I) Ineligible
- (W) Walk-on
- Injured
- Current redshirt

Roster

== Schedule and results ==
Date time, TV	Rank^{#}	Opponent^{#}	Result	Record	High points	High rebounds	High assists	Site (attendance) city, state
Non-conference regular season
November 3, 2025*; 7:30 p.m., ESPN+		Saint Peter's	W 77–50	1–0	12 – Hines	9 – Hines	3 – Dar	Prudential Center (6,312); Newark, NJ
November 7, 2025*; 7:30 p.m., ESPN+		Wagner	W 68–61	2–0	19 – Fisher	11 – Payne	6 – Clark	Walsh Gymnasium (1,308); South Orange, NJ
November 10, 2025*; 8:00 p.m., ESPN+		Fairfield	W 82−59	3−0	13 – Staton-McCray	10 – Hines	4 – Clark	Walsh Gymnasium (1,297); South Orange, NJ
November 13, 2025*; 7:00 p.m., ESPN+		Monmouth	W 70−58	4−0	14 – Simpkins	8 – Tied	6 – Clark	Prudential Center (6,179); Newark, NJ
November 18, 2025*; 7:00 p.m., ESPN+		New Haven	W 68−45	5−0	18 – Simpkins	11 – Payne	5 – Clark	Prudential Center (6,201); Newark, NJ
November 24, 2025*; 2:30 p.m., ESPN2		vs. No. 23 NC State; Maui Invitational Quarterfinals	W 85–74	6–0	22 – Staton-McCray	8 – Staton-McCray	3 – Tied	Lahaina Civic Center (2,400); Lahaina, HI
November 25, 2025*; 5:00 p.m., ESPN		vs. USC; Maui Invitational Semifinals	L 81–83	6–1	18 – Clark	5 – Tied	7 – Clark	Lahaina Civic Center (2,400); Lahaina, HI
November 26, 2025*; 5:30 p.m., ESPN2		vs. Washington State; Maui Invitational 3rd Place Game	W 75–61	7–1	20 – Staton-McCray	7 – Payne	7 – Clark	Lahaina Civic Center (2,400); Lahaina, HI
December 3, 2025*; 7:00 p.m., ESPN+		Central Connecticut	W 77–61	8–1	12 – Tied	7 – Tied	12 – Clark	Walsh Gymnasium (1,219); South Orange, NJ
December 6, 2025*; 12:00 p.m., ESPNU		at Kansas State	W 78–67	9–1	16 – Tied	6 – Tied	4 – Staton-McCray	Bramlage Coliseum (9,195); Manhattan, KS
December 13, 2025*; 8:00 p.m., FS1		Rutgers; Garden State Hardwood Classic	W 81–59	10–1	18 – Staton-McCray	6 – Tied	7 – Clark	Prudential Center (11,153); Newark, NJ
Big East regular season
December 19, 2025; 6:30 p.m., FS1		at Providence	W 72–67	11–1 (1–0)	22 – Simpkins	16 – Payne	7 – Clark	Amica Mutual Pavilion (10,993); Providence, RI
December 23, 2025; 7:00 p.m., Peacock		Villanova	L 56–64	11–2 (1–1)	13 – Fisher	10 – Payne	3 – Stanton-McCray	Prudential Center (11,153); Newark, NJ
December 30, 2025; 7:00 p.m., FS1		at Marquette	W 79–73	12–2 (2–1)	14 – Payne	22 – Payne	6 – Clark	Fiserv Forum (15,028); Milwaukee, WI
January 4, 2026; 12:00 p.m., Peacock		Creighton	W 56–54	13–2 (3–1)	10 – Fisher	9 – Hines	3 – Parker	Prudential Center (8,532); Newark, NJ
January 10, 2026; 6:15 p.m., FS1		at Georgetown	W 76–67	14–2 (4–1)	22 – Clark	6 – Payne	2 – Clark	Capital One Arena (8,230); Washington, D.C.
January 13, 2026; 8:00 p.m., TruTV	No. 25	No. 3 UConn	L 64–69	14–3 (4–2)	16 – Williams	7 – Hines	2 – Clark	Prudential Center (9,699); Newark, NJ
January 17, 2026; 12:00 p.m., TNT/TruTV	No. 25	Butler	L 66–77	14–4 (4–3)	17 – Staton-McCray	16 – Hines	3 – Tied	Prudential Center (8,326); Newark, NJ
January 20, 2026; 7:00 p.m., FS1		at St. John's	L 60–65	14–5 (4–4)	16 – Staton-McCray	15 – Payne	2 – Clark	Madison Square Garden (13,776); New York, NY
January 24, 2026; 5:00 p.m., TruTV		at DePaul	L 60–67	14–6 (4–5)	14 – Tied	6 – Payne	5 – Clark	Wintrust Arena (5,368); Chicago, IL
January 28, 2026; 7:30 p.m., Peacock		Xavier	W 86–68	15–6 (5–5)	27 – Simpkins	8 – Hines	4 – Tied	Prudential Center (6,673); Newark, NJ
January 31, 2026; 12:00 p.m., Peacock		Marquette	W 69–64	16–6 (6–5)	19 – Clark	9 – Payne	6 – Clark	Prudential Center (8,131); Newark, NJ
February 4, 2026; 6:30 p.m., Peacock		at Villanova	L 60–72	16–7 (6–6)	18 – Clark	8 – Staton-Mccray	3 – Clark	Wells Fargo Center (6,501); Philadelphia, PA
February 7, 2026; 6:00 p.m., Peacock		at Creighton	L 68–69	16–8 (6–7)	20 – Clark	11 – Payne	4 – Clark	CHI Health Center Omaha (16,714); Omaha, NE
February 11, 2026; 7:30 p.m., Peacock		Providence	W 87–80	17–8 (7–7)	31 – Clark	6 – Rivera	8 – Clark	Prudential Center (7,590); Newark, NJ
February 15, 2026; 6:00 p.m., FS1		at Butler	W 63–56	18–8 (8–7)	19 – Staton-McCray	7 – Tied	7 – Clark	Hinkle Fieldhouse (6,773); Indianapolis, IN
February 18, 2026; 8:00 p.m., TruTV		DePaul	L 57–69	18–9 (8–8)	19 – Clark	6 – Payne	5 – Clark	Prudential Center (6,770); Newark, NJ
February 21, 2026; 6:15 p.m., FS1		Georgetown	W 51–47	19–9 (9–8)	12 – Hines	10 – Hines	2 – Tied	Prudential Center (9,055); Newark, NJ
February 28, 2026; 12:00 p.m., FS1		at No. 6 UConn	L 67–71	19–10 (9–9)	20 – Staton-McCray	11 – Hines	8 – Clark	Harry A. Gampel Pavilion (10,244); Storrs, CT
March 3, 2026; 7:00 p.m., TruTV		at Xavier	W 77−68	20−10 (10−9)	16 – Clark	8 – Dar	5 – Williams	Cintas Center (9,884); Cincinnati, OH
March 6, 2026; 9:00 p.m., FS1		No. 18 St. John's	L 65−72	20−11 (10−10)	15 – Clark	9 – Williams	3 – Tied	Prudential Center (9,554); Newark, NJ
Big East tournament
March 12, 2026; 2:30 p.m., Peacock/NBCSN	(4)	vs. (5) Creighton; Quarterfinal	W 72−61	21−11	16 – Clark	8 – Parker	6 – Clark	Madison Square Garden (19,812); New York, NY
March 13, 2026; 5:30 p.m., Fox	(4)	vs. (1) No. 13 St. John's; Semifinal	L 68−78	21−12	17 – Clark	7 – Stanton-McCray	11 – Clark	Madison Square Garden (19,812); New York, NY
*Non-conference game. ^{#}Rankings from AP Poll. (#) Tournament seedings in parentheses. All times are in Eastern Time.

== Rankings ==
Ranking movements Legend: ██ Increase in ranking ██ Decrease in ranking — = Not ranked RV = Received votes
	Week																				
Poll	Pre	1	2	3	4	5	6	7	8	9	10	11	12	13	14	15	16	17	18	19	Final
AP	—	—	—	—	RV	RV	RV	RV	RV*	RV	25	—	—	—	—	—	—	—	—	—	—
Coaches	—	—	—	—	—	RV	RV	RV	RV	RV	RV	RV	—	—	—	—	—	—	—	—	—

*AP did not release a week 8 poll.

== See also ==
- 2025–26 Seton Hall Pirates women's basketball team
