= 2025–26 Butler Bulldogs men's basketball team =

College basketball season

2025–26 Butler Bulldogs men's basketball

Greenbrier Tip-Off (Mountain Division) champions
- Conference: Big East Conference
- Record: 16–16 (7–13 Big East)
- Head coach: Thad Matta (4th, 5th overall season)
- Assistant coaches: Mike Pegues (4th season); Maurice Joseph (4th season); Alex Barlow (3rd season); Jon Diebler (2nd season); Connor McCaffery (2nd season)
- Home arena: Hinkle Fieldhouse

2025–26 Big East men's basketball standings
	Conf.				Overall
Team	W		L	PCT	W		L	PCT
No. 10 St. John's †	18	–	2	.900	30	–	7	.811
No. 2 UConn	17	–	3	.850	34	–	6	.850
Villanova	15	–	5	.750	24	–	9	.727
Seton Hall	10	–	10	.500	21	–	12	.636
Creighton	9	–	11	.450	16	–	18	.471
DePaul	8	–	12	.400	16	–	16	.500
Marquette	7	–	13	.350	12	–	20	.375
Butler	7	–	13	.350	16	–	16	.500
Providence	7	–	13	.350	15	–	18	.455
Xavier	6	–	14	.300	15	–	18	.455
Georgetown	6	–	14	.300	16	–	18	.471
† 2026 Big East tournament winner Rankings from AP poll

The 2025–26 Butler Bulldogs men's basketball team represented Butler University in the 2025–26 NCAA Division I men's basketball season. They were led by Thad Matta, in the fourth year of his second stint as head coach of his alma mater. The Bulldogs played their home games at Hinkle Fieldhouse in Indianapolis, Indiana, as members of the Big East Conference.

== Previous season ==
The Bulldogs finished the 2024–25 season 15–20, 6–14 in Big East play to finish in a tie for eighth place. As No. 9 seed in the Big East tournament they defeated Providence in the first round before losing in the quarterfinals to St. John's. They were invited to the College Basketball Crown, where they defeated Utah in the first round before losing in the quarterfinals to Boise State.

== Offseason ==
=== Departures ===
Name	Number	Pos.	Height	Weight	Year	Hometown	Reason for departure
Augusto Cassia	0	F	6'8"	220	Sophomore	Salvador, Brazil	Transferred to Ole Miss
Ryder Cate	5	G	6'5"	175	Freshman	Richmond, IN	Walk-on; transferred
Jahmyl Telfort	11	F	6'7"	225	Graduate Student	Boucherville, QC	Graduated, signed with the Los Angeles Clippers
Kolby King	12	G	6'2"	185	Junior	Pembroke Pines, FL	Transferred to Utah State
Landon Moore	14	G	6'3"	200	Junior	Bloomington, IL	Transferred to Illinois State
Pierre Brooks II	21	F	6'6"	240	Senior	Detroit, MI	Graduated
Patrick McCaffery	22	F	6'9"	215	Graduate Student	Iowa City, IA	Graduated
Andre Screen	23	C	7'1"	260	Graduate Student	Alexandria, VA	Graduated
Connor O'Guinn	25	G	6'2"	165	Freshman	Bloomington, IN	Walk-on; TBD
Boden Kapke	33	F/C	6'11"	255	Sophomore	Victoria, MN	Transferred to Boston College
Colt Langdon	45	F	6'7"	225	Freshman	Raleigh, NC	Transferred to NC State

=== Incoming transfers ===
Name	Number	Pos.	Height	Weight	Year	Hometown	Previous school	Seasons Remaining
Jalen Jackson	2	G	6'2"	200	Senior	Fort Wayne, IN	Purdue Fort Wayne	One
Michael Ajayi	5	F	6'7"	228	Graduate Student	Kent, WA	Gonzaga	One
Yame Butler	8	G	6'5"	215	Graduate Student	Greenbelt, MD	Drexel	One
Drayton Jones	13	C	6'11"	245	Junior	Houston, TX	South Carolina State	Two
Yohan Traore	21	F/C	6'11"	235	Senior	Tours, France	SMU	One

=== Recruiting classes ===
==== 2025 recruiting class ====
College recruiting
Name	Hometown	School	Height	Weight	Commit date
Efeosa Oliogu #8 SF	Toronto, ON	Overtime Elite	6 ft 5 in (1.96 m)	200 lb (91 kg)	Jan 13, 2025
Efeosa Oliogu #8 SF	Recruit ratings: Rivals: 247Sports: ESPN: (78)				
Jack McCaffery #16 PF	Iowa City, IA	West High School	6 ft 8 in (2.03 m)	205 lb (93 kg)	Jul 29, 2024
Jack McCaffery #16 PF	Recruit ratings: Rivals: 247Sports: ESPN: (82)				
Azavier Robinson #18 PG	Indianapolis, IN	Lawrence North High School	6 ft 1 in (1.85 m)	175 lb (79 kg)	Aug 3, 2024
Azavier Robinson #18 PG	Recruit ratings: Rivals: 247Sports: ESPN: (82)				
Jackson Keith #39 SF	Durham, NC	Southern Durham High School	6 ft 6 in (1.98 m)	190 lb (86 kg)	Sep 21, 2024
Jackson Keith #39 SF	Recruit ratings: Rivals: 247Sports: ESPN: (81)				
Overall recruit ranking:
Note: In many cases, Scout, Rivals, 247Sports, On3, and ESPN may conflict in their listings of height and weight.; In these cases, the average was taken. ESPN grades are on a 100-point scale.; Sources: "ESPN – Butler Bulldogs Men's Basketball Recruiting". ESPN.

==== 2026 recruiting class ====
College recruiting (2026)
Name	Hometown	School	Height	Weight	Commit date
Baron Walker; SG	Noblesville, IN	Noblesville High School	6 ft 3 in (1.91 m)	180 lb (82 kg)	Jul 30, 2025
Baron Walker; SG	Recruit ratings: Rivals: 247Sports: ESPN: (NR)				
Overall recruit ranking:
Note: In many cases, Scout, Rivals, 247Sports, On3, and ESPN may conflict in their listings of height and weight.; In these cases, the average was taken. ESPN grades are on a 100-point scale.; Sources: "ESPN - Butler Bulldogs Men's Basketball Recruiting". ESPN.

== Roster ==
2025–26 Butler Bulldogs men's basketball team
Players
Coaches

Pos.	#	Name	Height	Weight	Year	Previous school	Hometown
F	5	Michael Ajayi	6 ft 7 in (2.01 m)	235 lb (107 kg)	GS	Gonzaga	Kent, WA
G	8	Yame Butler	6 ft 5 in (1.96 m)	210 lb (95 kg)	GS	Drexel	Greenbelt, MD
G	2	Jalen Jackson (injured) (redshirt)	6 ft 2 in (1.88 m)	200 lb (91 kg)	Sr	Purdue Fort Wayne	Fort Wayne, IN
F/C	21	Yohan Traore	6 ft 11 in (2.11 m)	240 lb (109 kg)	Sr	SMU	Tours, France
G	11	Finley Bizjack	6 ft 4 in (1.93 m)	190 lb (86 kg)	Jr	Byron Nelson	Trophy Club, TX
C	13	Drayton Jones	6 ft 11 in (2.11 m)	250 lb (113 kg)	Jr	South Carolina State	Houston, TX
C	39	Kevin Ndzie (redshirt)	7 ft 1 in (2.16 m)	240 lb (109 kg)	Jr	Urania Milano	Yaoundé, Cameroon
G	3	Ethan McComb (W)	6 ft 1 in (1.85 m)	190 lb (86 kg)	Jr	Center Grove	Greenwood, IN
G/F	7	Jamie Kaiser Jr.	6 ft 6 in (1.98 m)	205 lb (93 kg)	RS So	Maryland	Burke, VA
G	1	Evan Haywood	6 ft 4 in (1.93 m)	200 lb (91 kg)	So	Brebeuf Jesuit	Carmel, IN
F	35	Bryson Cardinal (W) (redshirt)	6 ft 7 in (2.01 m)	205 lb (93 kg)	Fr	Guerin Catholic	Westfield, IN
F	0	Jackson Keith	6 ft 5 in (1.96 m)	225 lb (102 kg)	Fr	Southern	Durham, NC
F	6	Jack McCaffery (injured) (redshirt)	6 ft 9 in (2.06 m)	215 lb (98 kg)	Fr	Iowa City West	Iowa City, IA
F	4	Efeosa Oliogu-Elabor	6 ft 6 in (1.98 m)	220 lb (100 kg)	Fr	William Academy	Markham, ON
G	23	Azavier Robinson (injured)	6 ft 2 in (1.88 m)	195 lb (88 kg)	Fr	Lawrence North	Indianapolis, IN

Head coach

- Thad Matta (Butler)

Assistant coach(es)

- Mike Pegues (Delaware)
- Maurice Joseph (Vermont)
- Alex Barlow (Butler)
- Jon Diebler (Ohio State)
- Connor McCaffery (Iowa)

Legend

- (C) Team captain
- (S) Suspended
- (I) Ineligible
- (W) Walk-on
- Injured
- Current redshirt

Roster

== Schedule and results ==
Date time, TV	Rank^{#}	Opponent^{#}	Result	Record	High points	High rebounds	High assists	Site (attendance) city, state
Exhibition
October 17, 2025*; 7:00 p.m.		Notre Dame	L 76–77	–	16 – Bizjack	6 – Ajayi	4 – Oliogu-Elabor	Hinkle Fieldhouse (7,887); Indianapolis, IN
October 29, 2025*; 7:00 p.m.		Indiana State	W 105–80	–	24 – Bizjack	8 – Tied	4 – Tied	Hinkle Fieldhouse (6,994); Indianapolis, IN
Regular season
November 5, 2025*; 7:00 p.m., ESPN+		Southern Indiana	W 88–58	1–0	24 – Ajayi	12 – Ajayi	6 – Jackson	Hinkle Fieldhouse (6,855); Indianapolis, IN
November 8, 2025*; 5:00 p.m., ESPN+		IU Indy	W 112–80	2–0	17 – Jackson	14 – Ajayi	3 – Tied	Hinkle Fieldhouse (7,132); Indianapolis, IN
November 11, 2025*; 7:00 p.m., ESPN+		Chicago State	W 98–66	3–0	22 – Bizjack	11 – Ajayi	6 – Bizjack	Hinkle Fieldhouse (6,159); Indianapolis, IN
November 15, 2025*; 2:00 p.m., The CW		at SMU	L 85–87	3–1	18 – Bizjack	10 – Ajayi	6 – Jackson	Moody Coliseum (5,383); Dallas, TX
November 21, 2025*; 2:00 p.m., CBSSN		vs. South Carolina; Greenbrier Tip-Off Mountain Division	W 79–72	4–1	18 – Bizjack	14 – Ajayi	3 – Tied	Colonial Hall (1,209); White Sulphur Springs, WV
November 23, 2025*; 2:00 p.m., CBSSN		vs. Virginia; Greenbrier Tip-Off Mountain Division Championship	W 80–73	5–1	25 – Bizjack	14 – Ajayi	4 – Jackson	Colonial Hall (1,209); White Sulphur Springs, WV
November 28, 2025*; 2:00 p.m., ESPN+		Wright State	W 94–69	6–1	20 – Tied	8 – Ajayi	4 – Tied	Hinkle Fieldhouse (7,277); Indianapolis, IN
December 2, 2025*; 7:00 p.m., TruTV		Eastern Michigan	W 84–68	7–1	29 – Bizjack	13 – Ajayi	4 – Tied	Hinkle Fieldhouse (6,423); Indianapolis, IN
December 6, 2025*; 2:00 p.m., TruTV		Boise State	L 68–77	7–2	16 – Ajayi	8 – Ajayi	4 – Bizjack	Hinkle Fieldhouse (7,422); Indianapolis, IN
December 13, 2025; 2:00 p.m., TNT/TruTV		Providence	W 113–110 ^{2OT}	8–2 (1–0)	28 – Ajayi	15 – Ajayi	8 – Jones	Hinkle Fieldhouse (7,321); Indianapolis, IN
December 16, 2025; 8:30 p.m., Peacock/NBCSN		at No. 5 UConn	L 60–79	8–3 (1–1)	13 – Jones	8 – Ajayi	3 – Robinson	PeoplesBank Arena (15,495); Hartford, Connecticut
December 20, 2025*; 4:00 p.m., Peacock/NBCSN		vs. Northwestern; Indy Classic	W 61–58	9–3	19 – Ajayi	20 – Ajayi	2 – Tied	Gainbridge Fieldhouse (16,912); Indianapolis, IN
December 22, 2025*; 2:00 p.m., ESPN+		NJIT	W 101–52	10–3	15 – Ajayi	12 – Ajayi	4 – Oliogu-Elabor	Hinkle Fieldhouse (6,304); Indianapolis, IN
December 30, 2025; 9:00 p.m., FS1		at Creighton	L 85–89	10–4 (1–2)	20 – Traore	13 – Ajayi	8 – Robinson	CHI Health Center (16,761); Omaha, Nebraska
January 3, 2026; 12:00 p.m., TNT/TruTV		Villanova	L 67–85	10–5 (1–3)	18 – Bizjack	12 – Ajayi	5 – Ajayi	Hinkle Fieldhouse (8,034); Indianapolis, IN
January 6, 2026; 7:00 p.m., Peacock/NBCSN		St. John's	L 70–84	10–6 (1–4)	21 – Bizjack	9 – Ajayi	5 – Ajayi	Hinkle Fieldhouse (6,523); Indianapolis, IN
January 14, 2026; 6:30 p.m., FS1		at Xavier	L 75–89	10–7 (1–5)	22 – Ajayi	12 – Ajayi	5 – Oliogu-Elabor	Cintas Center (9,577); Cincinnati, OH
January 17, 2026; 12:00 p.m., TNT/TruTV		at No. 25 Seton Hall	W 77–66	11–7 (2–5)	25 – Bizjack	8 – Ajayi	4 – Robinson	Prudential Center (8,326); Newark, NJ
January 20, 2026; 7:30 p.m., TruTV		DePaul	W 87–80	12–7 (3–5)	24 – Bizjack	8 – Ajayi	5 – Tied	Hinkle Fieldhouse (6,336); Indianapolis, IN
January 23, 2026; 8:00 p.m., FS1		Marquette	W 87–76	13–7 (4–5)	28 – Bizjack	9 – Ajayi	5 – Ajayi	Hinkle Fieldhouse (8,033); Indianapolis, IN
January 28, 2026; 7:00 p.m., Peacock/NBCSN		at No. 25 St. John's	L 70–92	13–8 (4–6)	19 – Ajayi	11 – Ajayi	2 – Tied	Madison Square Garden (14,361); New York City, NY
January 31, 2026; 12:00 p.m., TNT/TruTV		Georgetown	L 64–77	13–9 (4–7)	19 – Kaiser Jr.	8 – Jones	4 – Ajayi	Hinkle Fieldhouse (7,755); Indianapolis, IN
February 4, 2026; 7:00 p.m., Peacock/NBCSN		at Providence	L 87–97 ^{2OT}	13–10 (4–8)	30 – Bizjack	12 – Ajayi	5 – Bizjack	Amica Mutual Pavilion (8,152); Providence, RI
February 7, 2026; 2:00 p.m., FS1		at Marquette	L 55–70	13–11 (4–9)	23 – Bizjack	19 – Ajayi	3 – Tied	Fiserv Forum (17,568); Milwaukee, WI
February 11, 2026; 7:30 p.m., TNT/TruTV		No. 6 UConn	L 70–80	13–12 (4–10)	15 – Jones	5 – Tied	6 – Ajayi	Hinkle Fieldhouse (8,644); Indianapolis, IN
February 15, 2026; 6:00 p.m., FS1		Seton Hall	L 56–63	13–13 (4–11)	21 – Ajayi	12 – Ajayi	7 – Butler	Hinkle Fieldhouse (6,773); Indianapolis, IN
February 18, 2026; 6:30 p.m., FS1		at Georgetown	W 93–89	14–13 (5–11)	19 – Bizjack	8 – Ajayi	6 – Bizjack	Capital One Arena (4,456); Washington, D.C.
February 21, 2026; 1:30 p.m., TNT/TruTV		Xavier	W 80–75	15–13 (6–11)	24 – Ajayi	9 – Ajayi	3 – Jones	Hinkle Fieldhouse (9,100); Indianapolis, IN
February 25, 2026; 7:00 p.m., FS1		at Villanova	L 73–82	15–14 (6–12)	17 – Ajayi	9 – Ajayi	2 – Tied	Finneran Pavilion (6,501); Villanova, PA
March 4, 2026; 6:00 p.m., FS1		Creighton	L 59–76	15–15 (6–13)	26 – Ajayi	13 – Ajayi	3 – Tied	Hinkle Fieldhouse (6,895); Indianapolis, IN
March 7, 2026; 12:00 p.m., FS1		at DePaul	W 81–71	16–15 (7–13)	19 – Bizjack	11 – Ajayi	5 – Ajayi	Wintrust Arena (6,005); Chicago, IL
Big East tournament
March 11, 2026; 4:00 p.m., Peacock/NBCSN	(8)	vs. (9) Providence; First round	L 81–91	16–16	21 – Ajayi	11 – Ajayi	5 – Bizjack	Madison Square Garden; New York City, NY
*Non-conference game. ^{#}Rankings from AP Poll. (#) Tournament seedings in parentheses. All times are in Eastern Time.

== See also ==
2025–26 Butler Bulldogs women's basketball team
