= Zuby Ejiofor =

American basketball player (born 2004)

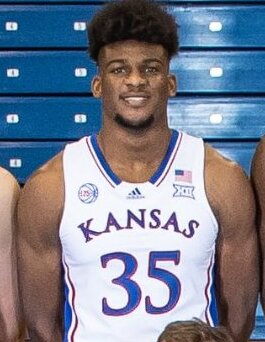
- Ejiofor with the Kansas Jayhawks in 2022

No. 20 – Atlanta Hawks
- Position: Power forward
- League: NBA

Personal information
- Born: April 20, 2004 (age 22) Dallas, Texas, U.S.
- Listed height: 6 ft 8 in (2.03 m)
- Listed weight: 240 lb (109 kg)

Career information
- High school: Garland (Garland, Texas)
- College: Kansas (2022–2023); St. John's (2023–2026)
- NBA draft: 2026: 1st round, 23rd overall pick
- Drafted by: Atlanta Hawks
- Playing career: 2026–present

Career history
- 2026–present: Atlanta Hawks

Career highlights
- Kareem Abdul-Jabbar Award (2026); Big East Player of the Year (2026); 2× First-team All-Big East (2025, 2026); Big East Defensive Player of the Year (2026); Big East Most Improved Player (2025); Big East All-Defensive team (2026); Big East tournament MVP (2026); AP Honorable Mention All-American (2026); Haggerty Award (2026)
- Stats at NBA.com
- Stats at Basketball Reference

Chukwuebuka Ejiofor (born April 20, 2004) is an American professional basketball player for the Atlanta Hawks of the National Basketball Association (NBA). He played college basketball for the Kansas Jayhawks and St. John's Red Storm.

== Early life and high school career ==
Ejiofor attended Garland High School in Garland, Texas, where he averaged 21 points and 13 rebounds per game as a junior. As a senior, he averaged 22 points, 13 rebounds, four blocks and two steals per game. Coming out of high school, Ejiofor was rated as a four-star recruit and committed to play college basketball for the Kansas Jayhawks.

== College career ==
=== Kansas ===
On December 17, 2022, Ejiofor put up eight points, two rebounds, and a block in a win over Indiana. He finished his freshman season in 2022–23 appearing in 25 games, where he averaged 1.2 points and 1.7 rebounds in 5.2 minutes per game.

At the end of Ejiofor’s freshman year, Kansas head coach Bill Self wanted him to redshirt for a year. Self told Ejiofor and his father, Andy Philachack, that he wasn’t “good enough to start and/or play major minutes on any Big 12 team.” The conversation led Ejiofor to transfer. His father later said: “The conversation was pretty serious, Zuby didn’t like it at all. Basically Zuby was like, ‘I didn’t even get a chance.’ Telling him he’s not good enough to play, that put a fire in (Zuby). It was like, ‘All right Dad, get me out of here.’”

After the season, Ejiofor entered his name into the NCAA transfer portal, and later transferred to play for the St. John's Red Storm. By the end of his time at St. John's, he was projected to be drafted early in the 2nd round of the NBA draft, a level that most Big 12 starters don't reach. In the 2026 NCAA tournament Round of 32, he helped St. John’s beat his former team, Kansas, and his former coach to advance the school to the Sweet 16 for the first time in 25 years.

Before the game, Self said: “We didn’t want him to leave. We’re really happy for his success. We just hope it doesn’t come against us.”

=== St. John's ===
In his junior and senior years at St. John’s, Ejiofor led St. John’s to consecutive Big East regular season championships and tournament championships. In his senior year, he was chosen as the Big East Defensive Player of the Year, and the unanimous choice for conference Player of the Year. He was the first ever St. John's player to receive both honors in one year. He was a key reason why St. John’s finished the season ranked number 10 in the country. He was also named the winner of the Big East Scholar-Athlete of the Year, making him only the 2nd player in Big East history to win all three awards in one year.

At the time of the academic award, the Big East wrote that: "He is averaging 16.0 points, 7.1 rebounds, 3.0 assists and 2.0 blocks per game for the Red Storm this season. He is the only power conference player to rank top 10 in his respective conference and lead his team in all four of those statistical categories."

In his senior year, Ejiofor was also selected as a finalist for the Kareem Abdul-Jabbar Center of the Year, and named one of four finalists for the national Naismith Trophy Defensive Player of the Year award, presented at the Final Four. He ranked 2nd in the conference and 18th in the country with 2.2 blocks per game. He also set the record for the most blocked shots in a Big East Tournament Championship game with 7 against Connecticut.

During the 2023-24 season, he averaged 4.3 points, 3.1 rebounds and 1.1 blocks per game. On December 7, 2024, Ejiofor notched 28 points and 13 rebounds in win against Kansas State. On December 20, he recorded 19 points and 10 rebounds, including the game-winning shot in a 72–70 win versus Providence. On February 26, 2025, Ejiofor finished with 12 points, four rebounds and three assists in a victory against Butler. On March 8, he scored 17 points while bringing down 12 rebounds and hitting the game-winning shot in overtime in a win over Marquette. For his performance during the 2024–25 season, Ejiofor was named a first-team all-Big East Conference selection.

St. John’s coach Rick Pitino praised Ejiofor, saying: “Zuby’s always trying to get better. He’s always talking about his teammates. He’s an all-American off the court because it’s all about his teammates. It’s never about him. He’s a huge throwback to what you see with young athletes today. It’s never about him. It’s always about the teammates. It’s always about St. John’s. He’s a great throwback. I’m going to miss him terribly."

During Ejiofor's final Big East tournament, Seton Hall's head coach, Shaheen Holloway, told him: “Zuby, I’m glad you’re getting out of the league. Zuby embodies what the Big East is all about. I don’t like playing against you, but I’m a big fan of yours.”

After the 2025–26 season, Ejiofor was awarded the Haggerty Award as the top player in the New York City metro area.

== Professional career ==
On June 23, 2026, Ejiofor was selected with the 23rd overall pick by the Atlanta Hawks in the 2026 NBA draft.

== Career statistics ==
Legend
GP	Games played	GS	Games started	MPG	Minutes per game
FG%	Field goal percentage	3P%	3-point field goal percentage	FT%	Free throw percentage
RPG	Rebounds per game	APG	Assists per game	SPG	Steals per game
BPG	Blocks per game	PPG	Points per game	**Bold**	Career high

=== College ===
*	Led Big East Conference

Year	Team	GP	GS	MPG	FG%	3P%	FT%	RPG	APG	SPG	BPG	PPG
2022–23	Kansas	25	0	5.1	**.650**	–	.500	1.7	.2	.1	.6	1.2
2023–24	St. John's	33	1	11.2	.489	**.375**	.712	3.1	.7	.4	1.1	4.3
2024–25	St. John's	36*	35	**31.8**	.577	.222	.708	**8.1**	1.6	.9	1.4	14.7
2025–26	St. John's	**37**	**37**	30.0	.536	.305	**.718**	7.3	**3.5**	**1.2**	**2.1**	**16.3**
Career		131	73	21.0	.550	.277	.709	5.4	1.7	.7	1.4	10.0
