= 2025–26 Xavier Musketeers men's basketball team =

American college basketball season

2025–26 Xavier Musketeers men's basketball
- Conference: Big East Conference
- Record: 15–18 (6–14 Big East)
- Head coach: Richard Pitino (1st season)
- Associate head coach: Isaac Chew
- Assistant coaches: Tarvish Felton; Dante Jackson; Kareem Richardson
- Home arena: Cintas Center

2025–26 Big East men's basketball standings
	Conf.				Overall
Team	W		L	PCT	W		L	PCT
No. 10 St. John's †	18	–	2	.900	30	–	7	.811
No. 2 UConn	17	–	3	.850	34	–	6	.850
Villanova	15	–	5	.750	24	–	9	.727
Seton Hall	10	–	10	.500	21	–	12	.636
Creighton	9	–	11	.450	16	–	18	.471
DePaul	8	–	12	.400	16	–	16	.500
Marquette	7	–	13	.350	12	–	20	.375
Butler	7	–	13	.350	16	–	16	.500
Providence	7	–	13	.350	15	–	18	.455
Xavier	6	–	14	.300	15	–	18	.455
Georgetown	6	–	14	.300	16	–	18	.471
† 2026 Big East tournament winner Rankings from AP poll

The 2025–26 Xavier Musketeers men's basketball team represented Xavier University during the 2025–26 NCAA Division I men's basketball season as a member of the Big East Conference. The Musketeers, led by first-year Richard Pitino, played their home games at the Cintas Center in Cincinnati, Ohio.

== Previous season ==
The Musketeers finished the 2024–25 season 22–13, 13–7 in Big East play to finish in a tie for fourth place. As the No. 4 seed in the Big East tournament, they lost Marquette in the quarterfinals. They received an at-large bid to the NCAA tournament as a No. 11 seed in the Midwest region. They defeated Texas in the First Four before losing to Illinois in the round of 64.

On March 24, 2025, head coach Sean Miller left the school for a second time as he was named the head coach of Texas. Two days later, the school named New Mexico head coach Richard Pitino the team's new head coach.

== Offseason ==
=== Departures ===
Name	Number	Pos.	Height	Weight	Year	Hometown	Reason for departure
Trey Green	0	G	6'0"	168	Sophomore	Charlotte, NC	Transferred to Saint Louis
Marcus Foster	1	G	6'5"	215	Graduate student	Atlanta, GA	Graduated
Jerome Hunter	2	F	6'8"	216	Graduate student	Columbus, OH	Graduated
Dailyn Swain	3	G/F	6'7"	200	Sophomore	Columbus, OH	Transferred to Texas
John Hugley IV	4	F	6'11"	260	(redshirt) Senior	Cleveland, OH	Transferred to Duquesne
Lassina Traoré	6	F	6'10"	240	Senior	Abidjan, Côte d'Ivoire	Transferred to Texas
Ryan Conwell	7	G	6'3"	210	Junior	Indianapolis, IN	Transferred to Louisville
Cam'Ron Fletcher	11	G	6'7"	230	Graduate student	St. Louis, MO	Transferred to High Point
Dayvion McKnight	20	G	6'0"	195	Graduate student	Shelbyville, KY	Graduated
Dante Maddox Jr.	21	G	6'2"	200	Senior	Chicago Heights, IL	Transferred
Zach Freemantle	32	F	6'9"	227	Graduate student	Teaneck, NJ	Graduated/undrafted in 2025 NBA draft; signed with the Orlando Magic
Bob Nunge	35	G	6'6"	190	Senior	Newburgh, IN	Walk-on; graduated
Brad Colbert	45	G	6'2"	200	Senior	Loveland, OH	Graduated

=== Incoming transfers ===
Name	Num	Pos.	Height	Weight	Year	Hometown	Previous school
Malik Messina-Moore	1	G	6'5"	190	Senior	Ventura, CA	Montana
Gabriel Pozzato	2	F	6'7"	200	Sophomore	Rome, Italy	Evansville
All Wright	3	G	6'3"	180	Sophomore	Durango, Mexico	Valparaiso
Filip Borovićanin	4	F	6'9"	220	Senior	Belgrade, Serbia	New Mexico
Isaiah Walker	7	G	6'5"	200	(redshirt) Senior	Wyoming, OH	Belmont
Luke Naser	8	G	6'0"	200	Sophomore	Las Vegas, NV	Walk-on; UNLV
Mier Panoam	9	G	6'2"	200	Junior	Anchorage, AK	North Dakota
Tre Carroll	12	F	6'7"	233	(redshirt) Junior	Punta Gorda, FL	Florida Atlantic
Anthony Robinson	21	F/C	6'10"	238	(redshirt) Sophomore	Peachtree City, GA	Virginia
Pape N'Diaye	22	F	7'0"	215	Sophomore	Ivory Coast	UNLV
Jovan Milicevic	24	F	6'10"	260	Sophomore	Toronto, ON	New Mexico

=== Recruiting class ===
College recruiting
Name	Hometown	School	Height	Weight	Commit date
Kason Westphal; C	Salida, CO	Salida High School	7 ft 0 in (2.13 m)	225 lb (102 kg)	Apr 23, 2025
Kason Westphal; C	Recruit ratings: Scout: Rivals: 247Sports: (NR)				
Overall recruit ranking:
Note: In many cases, Scout, Rivals, 247Sports, On3, and ESPN may conflict in their listings of height and weight.; In these cases, the average was taken. ESPN grades are on a 100-point scale.; Sources: "Xavier 2025 Basketball Commitments". Rivals.; "2025 Xavier Musketeers Recruiting Class". ESPN.; "2025 Team Ranking". Rivals.; "Xavier 2025 Basketball Commits". 247Sports.

== Roster ==
2025–26 Xavier Musketeers men's basketball team
Players
Coaches

Pos.	#	Name	Height	Weight	Year	Previous school	Hometown
G	0	Roddie Anderson III	6 ft 3 in (1.91 m)	190 lb (86 kg)	Sr	Boise State	Huntington Beach, CA
F	20	Henry Thole (W)	6 ft 7 in (2.01 m)	215 lb (98 kg)	So	Villa Madonna Academy	Union, KY
G	25	Michael Wolf (W)	6 ft 0 in (1.83 m)	195 lb (88 kg)	Sr	Bridgton Academy	Greenwood Village, CO
F	31	Ian Sabourin (W)	6 ft 4 in (1.93 m)	210 lb (95 kg)	Jr	Badin HS	Hamilton, OH
F	4	Filip Borovićanin	6 ft 9 in (2.06 m)	222 lb (101 kg)	Sr	New Mexico	Belgrade, Serbia
F	12	Tre Carroll	6 ft 8 in (2.03 m)	235 lb (107 kg)	RS Jr	Charlotte	Punta Gorda, FL
G	1	Malik Messina-Moore	6 ft 4 in (1.93 m)	200 lb (91 kg)	Sr	Montana	Ventura, CA
F	24	Jovan Milicevic	6 ft 10 in (2.08 m)	241 lb (109 kg)	So	New Mexico	Toronto, ON
F	22	Pape N'Diaye	7 ft 0 in (2.13 m)	230 lb (104 kg)	So	UNLV	Abidjan, Côte d'Ivoire
G	8	Luke Naser (W)	6 ft 2 in (1.88 m)	179 lb (81 kg)	So	UNLV	Las Vegas, NV
G	9	Mier Panoam	6 ft 2 in (1.88 m)	200 lb (91 kg)	Jr	North Dakota	Anchorage, AK
F	2	Gabriel Pozzato	6 ft 7 in (2.01 m)	200 lb (91 kg)	So	Evansville	Novara, Italy
F/C	21	Anthony Robinson	6 ft 10 in (2.08 m)	252 lb (114 kg)	RS So	Virginia	Atlanta, GA
G	7	Isaiah Walker	6 ft 5 in (1.96 m)	205 lb (93 kg)	RS Sr	Belmont	Wyoming, OH
C	15	Kason Westphal	7 ft 0 in (2.13 m)	210 lb (95 kg)	Fr	Salida HS	Salida, CO
G	3	All Wright	6 ft 3 in (1.91 m)	190 lb (86 kg)	So	Valparaiso	Durango, Mexico

Head coach

- Richard Pitino (Providence)

Assistant coach(es)

- Isaac Chew (Avila)
- Tarvish Felton (Southern Utah)
- Dante Jackson (Xavier)
- Kareem Richardson (Evansville)

Legend

- (C) Team captain
- (S) Suspended
- (I) Ineligible
- (W) Walk-on
- Injured
- Current redshirt

Roster

== Schedule and results ==
Date time, TV	Rank^{#}	Opponent^{#}	Result	Record	High points	High rebounds	High assists	Site (attendance) city, state
Exhibition
October 18, 2025*; 2:00 p.m.		Murray State	L 70–75		21 – Carroll	13 – Carroll	3 – Tied	Cintas Center; Cincinnati, OH
Non-conference regular season
November 3, 2025*; 7:15 p.m., ESPN+		Marist	W 66–62	1–0	16 – Messina-Moore	5 – Robinson	4 – Anderson III	Cintas Center (9,776); Cincinnati, OH
November 6, 2025*; 7:00 p.m., ESPN+		Le Moyne	W 74–69	2–0	17 – Messina-Moore	12 – Borovićanin	5 – Messina-Moore	Cintas Center (9,480); Cincinnati, OH
November 10, 2025*; 8:30 p.m., FS1		Santa Clara	L 68−87	2−1	29 – Anderson III	5 – Milicevic	4 – Messina-Moore	Cintas Center (9,830); Cincinnati, OH
November 14, 2025*; 8:00 p.m., FS1		at Iowa	L 62–81	2–2	15 – Milicevic	5 – Tied	3 – Borovićanin	Carver–Hawkeye Arena (11,678); Iowa City, IA
November 18, 2025*; 7:00 p.m., ESPN+		Old Dominion	W 99–69	3–2	20 – Tied	7 – Tied	8 – Messina-Moore	Cintas Center (9,326); Cincinnati, OH
November 21, 2025*; 9:00 p.m., ESPN2		vs. Georgia; Charleston Classic Palmetto Bracket semifinals	L 77–78	3–3	19 – Tied	12 – Borovićanin	4 – Borovićanin	TD Arena (4,856); Charleston, SC
November 23, 2025*; 3:30 p.m., ESPN		vs. West Virginia; Charleston Classic Palmetto Bracket consolation game	W 78–68	4–3	21 – Milicevic	7 – Milicevic	5 – Anderson III	TD Arena (3,823); Charleston, SC
November 28, 2025*; 5:30 p.m., ESPN+		Texas A&M–Corpus Christi	W 88–67	5–3	14 – Milicevic	15 – Borovićanin	5 – Tied	Cintas Center (9,314); Cincinnati, OH
December 1, 2025*; 7:00 p.m., TruTV		Saint Francis (PA)	W 96–74	6–3	28 – Anderson III	8 – Borovićanin	7 – Messina-Moore	Cintas Center (9,143); Cincinnati, OH
December 5, 2025*; 7:30 p.m., TNT		Cincinnati; Rivalry/Crosstown Shootout	W 79–74	7–3	30 – Carroll	7 – Carroll	6 – Messina-Moore	Cintas Center (10,880); Cincinnati, OH
December 12, 2025*; 7:00 p.m., TruTV		Missouri State	W 75–57	8–3	17 – Milicevic	11 – Borovićanin	8 – Borovićanin	Cintas Center (9,112); Cincinnati, OH
Big East regular season
December 17, 2025; 6:30 p.m., FS1		Creighton	L 57–98	8–4 (0–1)	14 – Messina-Moore	5 – Messina-Moore	6 – Borovićanin	Cintas Center (9,283); Cincinnati, OH
December 20, 2025; 8:30 p.m., FS1		at Georgetown	W 80–77	9–4 (1–1)	22 – Carroll	13 – Borovićanin	4 – Tied	Capital One Arena (5,077); Washington D.C.
December 31, 2025; 5:00 p.m., Peacock		No. 4 UConn	L 67–90	9–5 (1–2)	16 – Messina-Moore	11 – Borovićanin	6 – Borovićanin	Cintas Center (9,825); Cincinnati, OH
January 3, 2026; 2:00 p.m., FS1		at DePaul	L 77–86	9–6 (1–3)	17 – Carroll	10 – Borovićanin	3 – Tied	Wintrust Arena (5,266); Chicago, IL
January 7, 2026; 7:00 p.m., FS1		at Marquette	L 65–66	9–7 (1–4)	22 – Messina-Moore	7 – Borovićanin	3 – Tied	Fiserv Forum (14,020); Milwaukee, WI
January 10, 2026; 4:00 p.m., FS1		Providence	W 97–84	10–7 (2–4)	23 – Messina-Moore	10 – Borovićanin	6 – Borovićanin	Cintas Center (9,693); Cincinnati, OH
January 14, 2026; 6:30 p.m., FS1		Butler	W 89–75	11–7 (3–4)	29 – Carroll	9 – Carroll	9 – Tied	Cintas Center (9,577); Cincinnati, OH
January 21, 2026; 7:00 p.m., FS1		at Creighton	L 93–94	11–8 (3–5)	29 – Carroll	8 – Borovićanin	9 – Borovićanin	CHI Health Center Omaha (16,485); Omaha, NE
January 24, 2026; 2:30 p.m., TNT		St. John's	L 83–88	11–9 (3–6)	31 – Carroll	10 – Borovićanin	6 – Borovićanin	Cintas Center (10,399); Cincinnati, OH
January 28, 2026; 7:30 p.m., Peacock		at Seton Hall	L 68–86	11–10 (3–7)	22 – Carroll	8 – Borovićanin	3 – Tied	Prudential Center (6,673); Newark, NJ
January 31, 2026; 1:00 p.m., FS1		DePaul	W 68–66	12–10 (4–7)	21 – Carroll	7 – Walker	4 – Borovićanin	Cintas Center (9,596); Cincinnati, OH
February 3, 2026; 7:00 p.m., Peacock		at No. 3 UConn	L 60–92	12–11 (4–8)	14 – Wright	14 – Carroll	2 – Tied	PeoplesBank Arena (15,495); Hartford, CT
February 9, 2026; 6:30 p.m., FS1		at No. 17 St. John's	L 82–87 ^{OT}	12–12 (4–9)	21 – Carroll	10 – Borovićanin	4 – Carroll	Madison Square Garden (14,812); New York, NY
February 14, 2026; 3:00 p.m., TNT		Marquette	W 96–88	13–12 (5–9)	23 – Milicevic	11 – Borovićanin	11 – Messina-Moore	Cintas Center (9,924); Cincinnati, OH
February 17, 2026; 6:30 p.m., FS1		Villanova	L 89–92 ^{OT}	13–13 (5–10)	28 – Carroll	10 – Carroll	7 – Messina-Moore	Cintas Center (9,439); Cincinnati, OH
February 21, 2026; 1:30 p.m., TNT		at Butler	L 75–80	13–14 (5–11)	24 – Carroll	10 – Borovićanin	4 – Carroll	Hinkle Fieldhouse (9,100); Indianapolis, IN
February 25, 2026; 7:30 p.m., TNT		at Providence	L 84–94	13–15 (5–12)	27 – Anderson III	9 – Borovićanin	3 – Carroll	Amica Mutual Pavilion (8,069); Providence, RI
February 28, 2026; 1:30 p.m., TNT		Georgetown	W 91–84	14–15 (6–12)	22 – Carroll	6 – Tied	5 – Messina-Moore	Cintas Center (9,785); Cincinnati, OH
March 3, 2026; 7:00 p.m., truTV		Seton Hall	L 68–77	14–16 (6–13)	15 – Borovićanin	7 – Borovićanin	7 – Borovićanin	Cintas Center (9,884); Cincinnati, OH
March 7, 2026; 12:00 p.m., TNT		at Villanova	L 78–91	14–17 (6–14)	21 – Milicevic	8 – Walker	5 – Anderson III	Finneran Pavilion (6,501); Villanova, PA
Big East tournament
March 11, 2026; 6:30 p.m., Peacock/NBCSN	(10)	vs. (7) Marquette; First round	W 89–87	15–17	21 – Milicevic	9 – Carroll	7 – Borovićanin	Madison Square Garden (19,812); New York, NY
March 12, 2026; 7:00 p.m., FS1	(10)	vs. (2) No. 6 UConn; Quarterfinals	L 68–93	15–18	22 – Borovićanin	5 – Carroll	2 – Milicevic	Madison Square Garden (19,812); New York, NY
*Non-conference game. ^{#}Rankings from AP poll. (#) Tournament seedings in parentheses. All times are in Eastern Time.
