= 2025–26 DePaul Blue Demons men's basketball team =

American college basketball season

2025–26 DePaul Blue Demons men's basketball
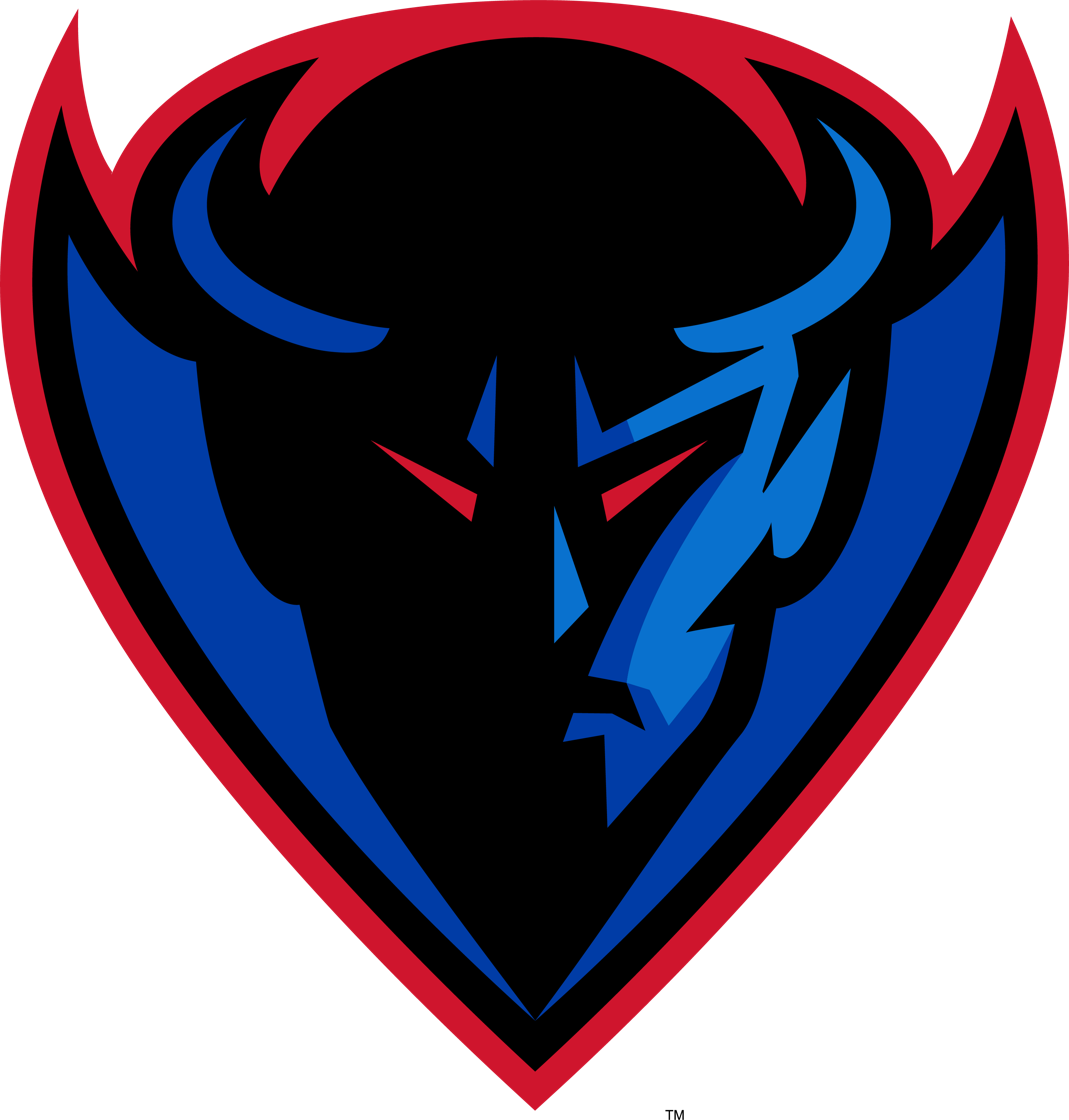
- Conference: Big East Conference
- Record: 16–16 (8–12 Big East)
- Head coach: Chris Holtmann (2nd season)
- Assistant coaches: Jack Owens (2nd season); Bryan Mullins (2nd season); Paris Parham (5th season); LaVall Jordan (2nd season); Brandon Bailey (2nd season)
- Home arena: Wintrust Arena

2025–26 Big East men's basketball standings
	Conf.				Overall
Team	W		L	PCT	W		L	PCT
No. 10 St. John's †	18	–	2	.900	28	–	6	.824
No. 7 UConn	17	–	3	.850	29	–	5	.853
Villanova	15	–	5	.750	24	–	8	.750
Seton Hall	10	–	10	.500	21	–	12	.636
Creighton	9	–	11	.450	15	–	17	.469
DePaul	8	–	12	.400	16	–	16	.500
Marquette	7	–	13	.350	12	–	20	.375
Butler	7	–	13	.350	16	–	16	.500
Providence	7	–	13	.350	15	–	18	.455
Xavier	6	–	14	.300	15	–	18	.455
Georgetown	6	–	14	.300	16	–	18	.471
† 2026 Big East tournament winner As of March 14, 2026; Rankings from AP poll

The 2025–26 DePaul Blue Demons men's basketball team represented DePaul University during the 2025–26 NCAA Division I men's basketball season. They were led by second-year head coach Chris Holtmann and played their home games at Wintrust Arena in Chicago, Illinois as members of the Big East Conference.

== Previous season ==
The Blue Demons finished the 2024–25 season 14–20, 4–16 in Big East play to finish in 10th place. They defeated Georgetown in the first round of the Big East tournament before losing to Creighton in the quarterfinals. They were selected to participate in the first-ever College Basketball Crown postseason tournament.

== Offseason ==
=== Departures ===
DePaul Departures
Name	Number	Pos.	Height	Weight	Year	Hometown	Reason for departure
Troy D'Amico	0	G	6'7"	215	Senior	Chicago, IL	Graduated
Isaiah Rivera	1	G	6'5"	210	GS Senior	Geneseco, IL	Graduated
Conor Enright	4	G	6'2"	175	(redshirt) Junior	Mundelein, IL	Transferred to Indiana
Sekou Konneh	5	F	6'9"	195	Freshman	Milwaukee, WI	Transferred to Milwaukee
Chris Riddle	10	F	6'5"	210	Freshman	Chicago, IL	Transferred to Toledo
Jacob Meyer	12	G	6'2"	190	Sophomore	Covington, KY	Transferred to UAB
JJ Traynor	20	F	6'9"	205	GS Senior	Bardstown, KY	Transferred to Murray State
David Thomas	23	G	6'1"	195	Sophomore	McDonough, GA	Transferred to Richmond
David Skogman	42	C	6'10"	240	GS Senior	Waukesha, GA	Graduated

=== Incoming transfers ===
DePaul Transfers
Name	Number	Pos.	Height	Weight	Year	Hometown	Previous School
Brandon Maclin	0	G	6'5"	215	Senior	Jackson, TN	Radford
Kaleb Banks	1	F	6'7"	215	Senior	Hampton, GA	Tulane
RJ Smith	5	G	6'3"	190	(redshirt) Junior	Chino, CA	Colorado
Khaman Maker	14	C	7'2"	220	Sophomore	Las Vegas, NV	St. John's
Jeremy Lorenz	32	F	6'8"	220	Junior	Brillion, WI	Wofford
Amsal Delalić	52	G	6'8"	210	Sophomore	Tuzla, Bosnia and Herzegovina	Pittsburgh

=== Recruiting classes ===
==== 2025 recruiting class ====
College recruiting information
Name	Hometown	School	Height	Weight	Commit date
Isaiah Medina; C	St. Petersburg, FL	Gibbs	7 ft 1 in (2.16 m)	205 lb (93 kg)	Aug 5, 2024
Isaiah Medina; C	Recruit ratings: Rivals: 247Sports: ESPN: (NR)				
Kruz McClure; SG	Westerville, OH	Westerville South	6 ft 5 in (1.96 m)	175 lb (79 kg)	Aug 5, 2024
Kruz McClure; SG	Recruit ratings: Rivals: 247Sports: ESPN: (NR)				
Overall recruit ranking:
Note: In many cases, Scout, Rivals, 247Sports, On3, and ESPN may conflict in their listings of height and weight.; In these cases, the average was taken. ESPN grades are on a 100-point scale.; Sources: "2025 DePaul Signees". Rivals.; "2025 DePaul Signees". ESPN.; "2025 Team Ranking". Rivals.

==== 2026 recruiting class ====
College recruiting information (2026)
Name	Hometown	School	Height	Weight	Commit date
Noah Smith #13 PF	Westfield, IN	Westfield	6 ft 1 in (1.85 m)	200 lb (91 kg)	Aug 4, 2025
Noah Smith #13 PF	Recruit ratings: Rivals: 247Sports: ESPN: (82)				
Mason Lockett; SG	Oswego, IL	Oswego East	6 ft 4 in (1.93 m)	185 lb (84 kg)	Aug 5, 2024
Mason Lockett; SG	Recruit ratings: Rivals: 247Sports: ESPN: (NR)				
Andrew Jensen; PF	Kaukauna, WI	Kaukauna	6 ft 9 in (2.06 m)	205 lb (93 kg)	Jul 22, 2025
Andrew Jensen; PF	Recruit ratings: Rivals: 247Sports: ESPN: (NR)				
Overall recruit ranking:
Note: In many cases, Scout, Rivals, 247Sports, On3, and ESPN may conflict in their listings of height and weight.; In these cases, the average was taken. ESPN grades are on a 100-point scale.; Sources: "2026 DePaul Signees". Rivals.; "2026 DePaul Signees". ESPN.; "2026 Team Ranking". Rivals.

== Roster ==
2025–26 DePaul Blue Demons men's basketball team
Players
Coaches

Pos.	#	Name	Height	Weight	Year	Previous school	Hometown
G	0	Brandon Maclin	6 ft 5 in (1.96 m)	215 lb (98 kg)	Sr	Jackson Southside; Radford	Jackson, TN
F	1	Kaleb Banks	6 ft 7 in (2.01 m)	215 lb (98 kg)	Sr	Fayette County HS; Tulane	Hampton, GA
G	2	Layden Blocker	6 ft 2 in (1.88 m)	185 lb (84 kg)	Jr	Sunrise Christian Academy (KS); Arkansas	Little Rock, AR
G	3	Nate Kasher (W)	6 ft 1 in (1.85 m)	175 lb (79 kg)	RS Fr	Glenbrook HS	Glenview, IL
G	5	RJ Smith	6 ft 3 in (1.91 m)	186 lb (84 kg)	RS Jr	Damien HS; Colorado	Chino, CA
G	6	Jonas Johnson (W)	6 ft 6 in (1.98 m)	—	Fr	DePaul Prep	Chicago, IL
F	7	Isaiah Medina	7 ft 1 in (2.16 m)	200 lb (91 kg)	Fr	Gibbs HS	Saint Petersburg, FL
G	11	CJ Gunn	6 ft 7 in (2.01 m)	200 lb (91 kg)	Sr	Lawrence North HS; Indiana	Indianapolis, IN
C	14	Khaman Maker	7 ft 2 in (2.18 m)	220 lb (100 kg)	So	SFBA Trinity Prep; St. John's	Las Vegas, NV
F	21	Théo Pierre-Justin	6 ft 10 in (2.08 m)	215 lb (98 kg)	So	Chorale Roanne Basket	Coudures, France
G	22	Kruz McClure	6 ft 5 in (1.96 m)	185 lb (84 kg)	Fr	DME Academy	Westerville, OH
F	32	Jeremy Lorenz	6 ft 8 in (2.03 m)	220 lb (100 kg)	Jr	Brillion HS; Wofford	Brillion, WI
F	35	N.J. Benson	6 ft 8 in (2.03 m)	235 lb (107 kg)	Sr	Mt. Vernon Township HS; Missouri State	Mount Vernon, IL
G	52	Amsal Delalić	6 ft 8 in (2.03 m)	210 lb (95 kg)	So	Borac Nektar; Pittsburgh	Tuzla, Bosnia and Herzegovina

Head coach

- Chris Holtmann (Taylor)

Assistant coach(es)

- Jack Owens (Eastern Illinois)
- Bryan Mullins (Southern Illinois)
- Paris Parham (Minnesota State)
- LaVall Jordan (Butler)
- Brandon Bailey (DePaul)

Legend

- (C) Team captain
- (S) Suspended
- (I) Ineligible
- (W) Walk-on
- Injured
- Current redshirt

Roster

== Schedule and results ==
Date time, TV	Rank^{#}	Opponent^{#}	Result	Record	High points	High rebounds	High assists	Site (attendance) city, state
Exhibition
October 19, 2025*; 6:00 p.m.		Loyola–Chicago	W 92–90 ^{OT}	–	18 – Smith	6 – Banks	5 – Tied	Wintrust Arena (4,153); Chicago, IL
October 24, 2025*; 5:00 p.m.		at Notre Dame	W 69–62	–	14 – Benson	9 – Benson	3 – Tied	Joyce Center (3,617); South Bend, IN
Non-conference regular season
November 3, 2025*; 7:00 p.m., ESPN+		Chicago State	W 92–62	1–0	16 – Blocker	10 – Benson	6 – Maclin	Wintrust Arena (3,495); Chicago, IL
November 7, 2025*; 7:00 p.m., ESPN+		Stonehill	W 72–64	2–0	28 – Gunn	10 – Benson	4 – Blocker	Wintrust Arena (3,162); Chicago, IL
November 11, 2025*; 7:00 p.m., ESPN+		Buffalo	L 53–66	2–1	11 – Benson	8 – Benson	5 – Blocker	Wintrust Arena (2,818); Chicago, IL
November 14, 2025*; 7:30 p.m., TruTV		Northwestern	L 79–81	2–2	15 – McClure	8 – Flores	4 – Pierre-Justin	Wintrust Arena (5,298); Chicago, IL
November 18, 2025*; 7:00 p.m., ESPN+		Gardner–Webb	W 93–62	3–2	18 – Gunn	5 – Tied	6 – Blocker	Wintrust Arena (2,762); Chicago, IL
November 23, 2025*; 5:00 p.m., ESPN+		Detroit Mercy	W 95–75	4–2	18 – Blocker	8 – Flores	7 – Smith	Wintrust Arena (3,339); Chicago, IL
November 28, 2025*; 6:00 p.m., CBSSN		vs. Georgia Tech; Emerald Coast Classic semifinals	W 75–61	5–2	18 – Blocker	9 – Benson	4 – Blocker	Raider Arena (1,200); Niceville, FL
November 29, 2025*; 6:00 p.m., CBSSN		vs. LSU; Emerald Coast Classic championship	L 63–96	5–3	22 – McClure	4 – Tied	3 – Tied	Raider Arena (1,920); Niceville, FL
December 6, 2025*; 8:00 p.m., TruTV		Arkansas–Pine Bluff	W 76–72	6–3	26 – Benson	9 – Benson	5 – Blocker	Wintrust Arena (4,480); Chicago, IL
December 9, 2025*; 7:00 p.m., ESPN+		Morgan State	W 92–49	7−3	18 – Banks	4 – Banks	4 – McClure	Wintrust Arena (2,966); Chicago, IL
December 13, 2025*; 11:00 a.m., ESPNU		at Wichita State	W 61–58	8−3	18 – Gunn	5 – Banks	3 – Tied	Charles Koch Arena (5,988); Wichita, KS
Big East regular season
December 16, 2025; 6:00 p.m., Peacock		at No. 22 St. John's	L 66–79	8–4 (0–1)	19 – Banks	10 – Banks	7 – Blocker	Carnesecca Arena (5,260); Queens, NY
December 21, 2025; 3:30 p.m., FS1		No. 5 UConn	L 54–72	8–5 (0–2)	11 – Blocker	8 – Benson	3 – Blocker	Wintrust Arena (7,297); Chicago, IL
December 31, 2025; 5:00 p.m., FS1		at Villanova	L 66–71	8–6 (0–3)	15 – Gunn	8 – Flores	5 – Maclin	Finneran Pavilion (6,501); Villanova, PA
January 3, 2026; 1:00 p.m., FS1		Xavier	W 86–77	9–6 (1–3)	22 – Gunn	7 – Tied	5 – Smith	Wintrust Arena (5,266); Chicago, IL
January 6, 2026; 7:05 p.m., TruTV		Georgetown	W 56–50	10–6 (2–3)	13 – Maclin	16 – Benson	5 – Blocker	Wintrust Arena (3,708); Chicago, IL
January 10, 2026; 11:30 a.m., TNT		at No. 4 UConn	L 60–72	10–7 (2–4)	16 – Blocker	5 – Tied	3 – Maclin	PeoplesBank Arena (15,495); Hartford, CT
January 16, 2026; 7:30 p.m., FS1		Marquette	W 80–75	11–7 (3–4)	31 – Gunn	7 – Maclin	8 – Blocker	Wintrust Arena (7,474); Chicago, IL
January 20, 2026; 6:30 p.m., TruTV		at Butler	L 80–87	11–8 (3–5)	20 – Blocker	6 – Benson	3 – Tied	Hinkle Fieldhouse (6,336); Indianapolis, IN
January 24, 2026; 4:00 p.m., TruTV		Seton Hall	W 67–60	12–8 (4–5)	19 – Gunn	10 – Benson	4 – Maclin	Wintrust Arena (5,368); Chicago, IL
January 28, 2026; 7:42 p.m., FS1		at Georgetown	L 61–70	12–9 (4–6)	19 – Maclin	6 – Benson	4 – Smith	Capital One Arena (3,422); Washington, D.C.
January 31, 2026; 12:00 p.m., FS1		at Xavier	L 66–68	12–10 (4–7)	19 – Gunn	8 – Benson	8 – Smith	Cintas Center (9,596); Cincinnati, OH
February 3, 2026; 7:00 p.m., Peacock		No. 22 St. John's	L 56–68	12–11 (4–8)	13 – Blocker	9 – Maclin	2 – Tied	Wintrust Arena (4,595); Chicago, IL
February 7, 2026; 3:00 p.m., FS1		at Providence	L 72–90	12–12 (4–9)	25 – Edwards	13 – Erhunmwunse	5 – Floyd Jr.	Amica Mutual Pavilion (12,023); Providence, RI
February 11, 2026; 8:00 p.m., Peacock/NBCSN		Creighton	W 72–71	13–12 (5–9)	23 – Benson	10 – Benson	5 – Tied	Wintrust Arena (3,763); Chicago, IL
February 18, 2026; 7:00 p.m., TruTV		at Seton Hall	W 69–57	14–12 (6–9)	21 – Benson	8 – Benson	4 – Blocker	Prudential Center (6,770); Newark, NJ
February 21, 2026; 7:00 p.m., FS1		Providence	L 68–71	14–13 (6–10)	19 – Benson	10 – Benson	4 – Blocker	Wintrust Arena (5,895); Chicago, IL
February 25, 2026; 8:00 p.m., Peacock		at Creighton	W 72–71	15–13 (7–10)	21 – Maclin	9 – Benson	5 – Blocker	CHI Health Center Omaha (15,994); Omaha, NE
March 1, 2026; 3:00 p.m., FS1		at Marquette	W 62–51	16–13 (8–10)	18 – Maclin	16 – Benson	5 – Smith	Fiserv Forum (14,582); Milwaukee, WI
March 4, 2026; 7:00 p.m., Peacock		Villanova	L 57–76	16–14 (8–11)	16 – Maclin	5 – Tied	4 – Maclin	Wintrust Arena (4,913); Chicago, IL
March 7, 2026; 11:00 a.m., FS1		Butler	L 71–81	16–15 (8–12)	24 – Benson	10 – Benson	7 – Maclin	Wintrust Arena (6,005); Chicago, IL
Big East tournament
March 11, 2026; 8:00 p.m., Peacock/NBCSN	(6)	(11) Georgetown; First round	L 56–63	16–16	16 – Blocker	6 – Maclin	7 – Blocker	Madison Square Garden (19,812); New York, NY
*Non-conference game. ^{#}Rankings from AP Poll. (#) Tournament seedings in parentheses. All times are in Central Time.
