= Grace Christian School (North Carolina) =

American private Christian school in North Carolina

GRACE Christian School

Location
- 801 Buck Jones Road (K–5); 1011 Buck Jones Rd (7–12); Raleigh, North Carolina 27606; United States; 35°46′6″N 78°44′21″W

Information
- Type: Private
- Religious affiliation: Protestant Christian
- Denomination: Non-denominational
- Established: 1983 (43 years ago)
- CEEB code: 343202
- Head of school: Eric Bradley
- Faculty: 80
- Grades: K–12
- Enrollment: 780
- Campus type: Suburban
- Colors: Navy blue, orange, and white
- Athletics: North Carolina Independent Schools Athletic Association (NCISAA)
- Mascot: Eagles
- Accreditation: ACSI, AdvancED
- Tuition: $8,410 (high school) $7,945 (middle school) $7,425 (elementary)
- Website: www.gracechristian.net

GRACE Christian School is a private, Christian, coeducational, primary and secondary day school in Raleigh and Cary, North Carolina, United States. Also known as GRACE Christian or simply GRACE, the school seeks to educate students in a traditional Christian environment. Each letter in GRACE is capitalized as it is an acronym that stands for Greater Raleigh Area Christian Education, the official name of the parent non-profit organization.

== Athletics ==
The GRACE Christian Eagles varsity football team won the 2019 NCISAA North Carolina 8-man football state championship. The Eagles began competing at the 11-man level of football in fall of 2022.

The GRACE Christian Eagles have won four boys' cross country state championships (2011, 2012, 2013, 2016) in the 2A classification.

GRACE has also had multiple state runner up finishes in volleyball, swimming, and soccer.
