= 2025–26 St. John's Red Storm men's basketball team =

American college basketball season

2025–26 St. John's Red Storm men's basketball

Big East regular season & tournament champions

NCAA tournament, Sweet Sixteen
- Conference: Big East Conference

Ranking
- Coaches: No. 10
- AP: No. 10
- Record: 30–7 (18–2 Big East)
- Head coach: Rick Pitino (3rd season)
- Associate head coach: Steve Masiello
- Assistant coaches: Ricky Johns; Bob Walsh; Taliek Brown
- Captains: Zuby Ejiofor; Sadiku Ibine Ayo; Dillon Mitchell
- Home arena: Carnesecca Arena; Madison Square Garden

2025–26 Big East men's basketball standings
	Conf.				Overall
Team	W		L	PCT	W		L	PCT
No. 10 St. John's †	18	–	2	.900	30	–	7	.811
No. 2 UConn	17	–	3	.850	34	–	6	.850
Villanova	15	–	5	.750	24	–	9	.727
Seton Hall	10	–	10	.500	21	–	12	.636
Creighton	9	–	11	.450	16	–	18	.471
DePaul	8	–	12	.400	16	–	16	.500
Marquette	7	–	13	.350	12	–	20	.375
Butler	7	–	13	.350	16	–	16	.500
Providence	7	–	13	.350	15	–	18	.455
Xavier	6	–	14	.300	15	–	18	.455
Georgetown	6	–	14	.300	16	–	18	.471
† 2026 Big East tournament winner Rankings from AP poll

The 2025–26 St. John's Red Storm men's basketball team represented St. John's University during the 2025–26 NCAA Division I men's basketball season. They were coached by Rick Pitino, in his third year at the school and 37th overall. They played their home games at Carnesecca Arena and Madison Square Garden as members of the Big East Conference.

== Previous season ==
The Red Storm had a breakout year under second year coach Rick Pitino where they finished the season 31–5, 18–2 in Big East play to win both the Big East regular season and tournament championship, and got a #2 seed to the NCAA Tournament. However, they lost to #10 seed Arkansas in the Round of 32.

== Offseason ==
Departures
Name	Number	Pos.	Height	Weight	Year	Hometown	Reason for departure
Aaron Scott	0	6'7"	210	F	Senior	Spring, TX	Graduated, signed with the Boston Celtics
Kadary Richmond	1	6'6"	205	G	GS Senior	Brooklyn, NY	Graduated, signed with the Washington Wizards
Deivon Smith	5	6'0"	175	G	Senior	Decatur, GA	Graduated, signed with the Atlanta Hawks
Simeon Wilcher	7	6'4"	190	G	Sophomore	Plainfield, NJ	Transferred to Texas
Vince Iwuchukwu	8	7'1"	250	C	Junior	Lagos, NG	Transferred to Georgetown
Jaiden Glover	11	6'4"	205	G/F	Freshman	Brooklyn, NY	Transferred to St. Joseph's
RJ Luis Jr.	12	6'7"	215	G/F	Junior	Miami, FL	Declared for 2025 NBA Draft/Undrafted, signed with the Utah Jazz
Khaman Maker	14	7'2"	220	C	Freshman	Juba, SS	Transferred to DePaul
Brady Dunlap	44	6'7"	190	G/F	(redshirt) Sophomore	Newhall, CA	Transferred to Saint Louis

Incoming transfers
Name	Num	Pos	Height	Weight	Year	Hometown	Previous school
Dylan Darling	0	G	6'1"	175	RS Junior	Spokane, WA	Idaho State
Dillon Mitchell	1	F	6'8"	205	Senior	Tampa, FL	Cincinnati
Joson Sanon	3	G	6'5"	200	Sophomore	Fall River, MA	Arizona State
Oziyah Sellers	4	G	6'5"	190	Senior	Hayward, CA	Stanford
Ian Jackson	11	G	6'5"	195	Sophomore	The Bronx	North Carolina
Bryce Hopkins	23	F	6'7"	225	GS Senior	Oak Park, IL	Providence
Handje Tamba	44	C	6'11"	240	GS Senior	Kinshasa, DRC	Milligan

=== Recruiting classes ===
==== 2025 recruiting class ====
College recruiting
Name	Hometown	School	Height	Weight	Commit date
Kelvin Odih; G	Providence, RI	Southern California Academy	6 ft 4 in (1.93 m)	215 lb (98 kg)	Apr 30, 2025
Kelvin Odih; G	Recruit ratings: Rivals: 247Sports: ESPN: (NR)				
Casper Pohto; G	Stockholm, Sweden	Sunrise Christian Academy (Kan.)	6 ft 3 in (1.91 m)	185 lb (84 kg)	Jun 7, 2025
Casper Pohto; G	Recruit ratings: Rivals: 247Sports: ESPN: (NR)				
Fotis Konstantinidis; G	Athens, Greece	Proteas Voulas B.C.	6 ft 2 in (1.88 m)	180 lb (82 kg)	
Fotis Konstantinidis; G	Recruit ratings: Rivals: 247Sports: ESPN: (NR)				
Imran Suljanovic; SF	Vienna, Austria	Pallacanestro Reggiana (Italy)	6 ft 8 in (2.03 m)	210 lb (95 kg)	Apr 22, 2025
Imran Suljanovic; SF	Recruit ratings: 247Sports:				
Overall recruit ranking:
Note: In many cases, Scout, Rivals, 247Sports, On3, and ESPN may conflict in their listings of height and weight.; In these cases, the average was taken. ESPN grades are on a 100-point scale.; Sources: "2025 Team Ranking". Rivals.

== Preseason ==
The Big East preseason coaches poll was reached on October 21, 2025. All awards were voted on by the league's 11 head coaches, who could not vote for their own team or players.

Big East Preseason Coaches Poll

	Big East Coaches	Points
1.	St. John's	97 (7)
2.	UConn	94 (4)
3.	Creighton	80
4.	Providence	64
5.	Marquette	60
6.	Georgetown	57
7.	Villanova	50
8.	Xavier	33
9.	DePaul	29
10.	Butler	26
11.	Seton Hall	15
Reference: (#) first-place votes

All-Big East Preseason Selections

Award	Player	Pos	Year	Src
Preseason Big East Player of the Year	Zuby Ejiofor	F	Sr.	
Preseason All-Big East First Team	Bryce Hopkins	G/F	Sr.	
Preseason All-Big East Second Team	Ian Jackson	G	So.	
Preseason All-Big East Third Team	Dillon Mitchell	F	Sr.	
Preseason All-Big East Third Team	Joson Sanon	G	So.	

Preseason Award Watch Lists

Award	Player	Pos	Year	Src
Jerry West Award Top 20	Ian Jackson	G	So.	
NABC Player of the Year Top 20	Zuby Ejiofor	F	Sr.	
Karl Malone Award Top 20	Bryce Hopkins	G/F	Sr.	
Kareem Abdul-Jabbar Award Top 20	Zuby Ejiofor	F	Sr.	
Naismith Player of the Year Top 50	Zuby Ejiofor	F	Sr.	
Naismith Player of the Year Top 50	Bryce Hopkins	G/F	Sr.	
Naismith Player of the Year Top 50	Ian Jackson	G	So.	

Top 25 Preseason Polls

AP
Ranking	Team
1	Purdue (35)
2	Houston (16)
3	Florida (8)
4	UConn (2)
5	St. John's
6	Duke
7	Michigan
8	BYU
9	Kentucky
10	Texas Tech
11	Louisville
12	UCLA
13	Arizona
14	Arkansas
15	Alabama
16	Iowa State
17	Illinois
18	Tennessee
19	Kansas
20	Auburn
21	Gonzaga
22	Michigan State
23	Creighton
24	Wisconsin
25	North Carolina

USA Today Coaches
Ranking	Team
1	Purdue (18)
2	Houston (12)
3	Florida (1)
4	UConn
5	Duke
6	St. John's
7	Michigan
8	BYU
9	Kentucky
10	Louisville
11	Texas Tech
12	UCLA
13	Arizona
14	Illinois
15	Arkansas
16	Alabama
17	Tennessee
18	Iowa State
19	Kansas
20	Gonzaga
21	Michigan State
22	Auburn
23	Creighton
24	Wisconsin
25	North Carolina

== Roster ==
2025–26 St. John's Red Storm men's basketball team
Players
Coaches

Pos.	#	Name	Height	Weight	Year	Previous school	Hometown
G	0	Dylan Darling	6 ft 1 in (1.85 m)	175 lb (79 kg)	RS Jr	Idaho State	Spokane, WA
F	1	Dillon Mitchell (C)	6 ft 8 in (2.03 m)	210 lb (95 kg)	Sr	Cincinnati	Tampa, FL
F	2	Sadiku Ibine Ayo (C)	6 ft 6 in (1.98 m)	215 lb (98 kg)	Sr	Iona	Asabi-Kumasi, Ghana
G	3	Joson Sanon	6 ft 5 in (1.96 m)	200 lb (91 kg)	So	Arizona State	Fall River, MA
G	4	Oziyah Sellers	6 ft 5 in (1.96 m)	190 lb (86 kg)	Sr	Stanford	Hayward, CA
G	5	Kelvin Odih	6 ft 4 in (1.93 m)	215 lb (98 kg)	Fr	SoCal Academy	Providence, RI
G	6	Casper Pohto (injured)	6 ft 3 in (1.91 m)	185 lb (84 kg)	Fr	Sunrise Christian Academy	Stockholm, Sweden
G	7	Fotis Konstantinidis	6 ft 2 in (1.88 m)	180 lb (82 kg)	Fr	Proteas Voulas B.C.	Athens, Greece
G	11	Ian Jackson	6 ft 5 in (1.96 m)	195 lb (88 kg)	So	North Carolina	Bronx, NY
F	17	Rubén Prey	6 ft 11 in (2.11 m)	230 lb (104 kg)	So	Joventut Badalona	Lisbon, Portugal
F	22	Imran Suljanovic (injured)	6 ft 8 in (2.03 m)	210 lb (95 kg)	Fr	Pallacanestro Reggiana	Vienna, Austria
G/F	23	Bryce Hopkins	6 ft 7 in (2.01 m)	225 lb (102 kg)	GS	Providence	Oak Park, IL
F	24	Zuby Ejiofor (C)	6 ft 9 in (2.06 m)	245 lb (111 kg)	Sr	Kansas	Garland, TX
G	31	Lefteris Liotopoulos	6 ft 4 in (1.93 m)	195 lb (88 kg)	So	DEKA Academy	Thessaloniki, Greece
C	44	Handje Tamba	6 ft 11 in (2.11 m)	240 lb (109 kg)	GS	Milligan	Kinshasa, DRC

Head coach

- Rick Pitino (UMass)

Assistant coach(es)

- Steve Masiello (Kentucky)
- Ricky Johns (Monroe)
- Bob Walsh (Hamilton)
- Taliek Brown (Connecticut)

Legend

- (C) Team captain
- (S) Suspended
- (I) Ineligible
- (W) Walk-on
- Injured
- Current redshirt

Roster

== Schedule and results ==
Date time, TV	Rank^{#}	Opponent^{#}	Result	Record	High points	High rebounds	High assists	Site (attendance) city, state
Exhibition
October 18, 2025*; 2:00 p.m., ESPN+	No. 5	Towson	W 73–63		13 – Hopkins	6 – 2 tied	4 – Hopkins	Carnesecca Arena (5,260); Queens, NY
October 25, 2025*; 7:00 p.m., BTN+	No. 5	No. 7 Michigan; Bad Boy Mowers Series-New York	L 94–96 ^{OT}		24 – Ejiofor	9 – Hopkins	6 – Ejiofor	Madison Square Garden (13,287); New York, NY
Regular season
November 3, 2025*; 6:30 p.m., FS1	No. 5	Quinnipiac	W 108–74	1–0	18 – Mitchell	7 – Mitchell	6 – Darling	Carnesecca Arena (5,260); Queens, NY
November 8, 2025*; 12:00 p.m., FS1	No. 5	No. 15 Alabama	L 96–103	1–1	27 – Ejiofor	10 – Ejiofor	4 – Mitchell	Madison Square Garden (17,319); New York, NY
November 15, 2025*; 6:00 p.m., truTV	No. 13	William & Mary	W 93–60	2–1	15 – 2 tied	6 – Odih	4 – Ejiofor	Carnesecca Arena (5,260); Queens, NY
November 20, 2025*; 7:00 p.m., TNT/truTV	No. 14	Bucknell	W 97–49	3–1	20 – Tied	11 – Mitchell	5 – Darling	Carnesecca Arena (5,260); Queens, NY
November 24, 2025*; 4:30 p.m., truTV	No. 14	vs. No. 15 Iowa State; Players Era Championship Game 1	L 82–83	3–2	20 – Sellers	9 – Tied	5 – Ejiofor	Michelob Ultra Arena; Paradise, NV
November 25, 2025*; 4:30 p.m., truTV	No. 14	vs. Baylor; Players Era Championship Game 2	W 96–81	4–2	26 – Hopkins	6 – Tied	6 – Mitchell	Michelob Ultra Arena; Paradise, NV
November 26, 2025*; 8:00 p.m., truTV	No. 14	vs. No. 21 Auburn; Players Era Championship consolation game	L 74–85	4–3	24 – Ejiofor	7 – Hopkins	4 – Mitchell	Michelob Ultra Arena; Paradise, NV
December 6, 2025*; 8:00 p.m., Peacock/NBCSN	No. 23	Ole Miss	W 63–58	5–3	15 – Ejiofor	9 – Ejiofor	2 – Tied	Madison Square Garden (14,799); New York, NY
December 13, 2025*; 12:00 p.m., TNT/truTV	No. 22	Iona; NYC Hoops for Heroes Classic	W 91–64	6–3	19 – Sellers	10 – Ejiofor	3 – Tied	Madison Square Garden (15,803); New York, NY
December 16, 2025; 7:00 p.m., Peacock	No. 22	DePaul	W 79–66	7–3 (1–0)	17 – Darling	9 – Sanon	4 – Sellers	Carnesecca Arena (5,260); Queens, NY
December 20, 2025*; 12:30 p.m., CBS	No. 22	vs. Kentucky; CBS Sports Classic	L 66–78	7–4	13 – Hopkins	6 – Jackson	3 – Tied	State Farm Arena; Atlanta, GA
December 23, 2025*; 6:00 p.m., FS1		Harvard	W 85–59	8–4	14 – Tied	9 – Ejiofor	4 – Tied	Carnesecca Arena (5,260); Queens, NY
December 31, 2025; 8:12 p.m., FS1		at Georgetown; Rivalry	W 95–83	9–4 (2–0)	25 – Ejiofor	10 – Tied	7 – Ejiofor	Capital One Arena (4,493); Washington, D.C.
January 3, 2026; 12:00 p.m., FOX		Providence	L 71–77	9–5 (2–1)	33 – Ejiofor	15 – Ejiofor	3 – Sanon	Madison Square Garden (19,047); New York, NY
January 6, 2026; 7:00 p.m., Peacock		at Butler	W 84–70	10–5 (3–1)	18 – Ejiofor	7 – Mitchell	5 – Mitchell	Hinkle Fieldhouse (6,523); Indianapolis, IN
January 10, 2026; 2:00 p.m., FS1		at Creighton	W 90–73	11–5 (4–1)	17 – Liotopoulos	9 – Mitchell	6 – Ejiofor	CHI Health Center (17,185); Omaha, NE
January 13, 2026; 6:30 p.m., Peacock		Marquette	W 92–68	12–5 (5–1)	24 – Sellers	8 – Tied	4 – Mitchell	Madison Square Garden (13,470); New York, NY
January 17, 2026; 8:00 p.m., Peacock		at Villanova	W 86–79	13–5 (6–1)	20 – Hopkins	10 – Mitchell	3 – Darling	Xfinity Mobile Arena (14,899); Philadelphia, PA
January 20, 2026; 7:00 p.m., FS1		Seton Hall	W 65–60	14–5 (7–1)	17 – Mitchell	11 – Mitchell	6 – Ejiofor	Madison Square Garden (13,776); New York, NY
January 24, 2026; 2:30 p.m., TNT/truTV		at Xavier	W 88–83	15–5 (8–1)	18 – Hopkins	11 – Ejiofor	6 – Mitchell	Cintas Center (10,399); Cincinnati, OH
January 28, 2026; 7:00 p.m., Peacock	No. 25	Butler	W 92–70	16–5 (9–1)	18 – Jackson	13 – Mitchell	5 – Ejiofor	Madison Square Garden (14,361); New York, NY
February 3, 2026; 8:00 p.m., Peacock	No. 22	at DePaul	W 68–56	17–5 (10–1)	16 – Ejiofor	9 – Ejiofor	4 – Ejiofor	Wintrust Arena (4,595); Chicago, IL
February 6, 2026; 8:00 p.m., FOX	No. 22	No. 3 UConn	W 81–72	18–5 (11–1)	21 – Ejiofor	10 – Ejiofor	7 – Ejiofor	Madison Square Garden (19,812); New York, NY
February 9, 2026; 6:30 p.m., FS1	No. 17	Xavier	W 87–82 ^{OT}	19–5 (12–1)	25 – Ejiofor	12 – Mitchell	5 – Ejiofor	Madison Square Garden (14,512); New York, NY
February 14, 2026; 1:00 p.m., TNT/truTV	No. 17	at Providence	W 79–69	20–5 (13–1)	23 – Darling	9 – Hopkins	6 – Mitchell	Amica Mutual Pavilion (11,714); Providence, RI
February 18, 2026; 9:00 p.m., TNT	No. 17	at Marquette	W 76–70	21–5 (14–1)	23 – Hopkins	10 – Hopkins	5 – Darling	Fiserv Forum (14,389); Milwaukee, WI
February 21, 2026; 12:00 p.m., FOX	No. 17	Creighton; Johnnies Day	W 81–52	22–5 (15–1)	17 – Darling	10 – Tied	7 – Mitchell	Madison Square Garden (19,328); New York, NY
February 25, 2026; 7:00 p.m., Peacock	No. 15	at No. 6 UConn	L 40–72	22–6 (15–2)	10 – Sanon	5 – Tied	2 – Tied	PeoplesBank Arena; Hartford, CT
February 28, 2026; 8:00 p.m., FOX	No. 15	Villanova	W 89–57	23–6 (16–2)	19 – Jackson	12 – Ejiofor	10 – Ejiofor	Madison Square Garden (19,812); New York, NY
March 3, 2026; 7:00 p.m., Peacock	No. 18	Georgetown; Rivalry	W 72–69	24–6 (17–2)	23 – Ejiofor	7 – Ejiofor	6 – Mitchell	Madison Square Garden (14,319); New York, NY
March 6, 2026; 9:00 p.m., FS1	No. 18	at Seton Hall	W 72–65	25–6 (18–2)	24 – Ejiofor	7 – Tied	7 – Mitchell	Prudential Center (9,554); Newark, NJ
Big East tournament
March 12, 2026; 12:00 p.m., Peacock/NBCSN	(1) No. 13	(9) Providence; Quarterfinal	W 85–72	26–6	21 – Ejiofor	13 – Hopkins	5 – Ejiofor	Madison Square Garden (19,812); New York, NY
March 13, 2026; 5:30 p.m., FOX	(1) No. 13	(4) Seton Hall; Semifinal	W 78–68	27–6	20 – Ejiofor	7 – Hopkins	5 – Mitchell	Madison Square Garden (19,812); New York, NY
March 14, 2026; 6:30 p.m., FOX	(1) No. 13	(2) No. 6 UConn; Championship	W 72–52	28–6	18 – Tied	9 – Tied	5 – Darling	Madison Square Garden (19,812); New York, NY
NCAA tournament
March 20, 2026*; 7:10 p.m., CBS	(5 E) No. 10	vs. (12 E) Northern Iowa; First round	W 79–53	29–6	14 – Ejiofor	11 – Ejiofor	5 – Darling	Viejas Arena (11,441); San Diego, CA
March 22, 2026*; 5:15 p.m., CBS	(5 E) No. 10	vs. (4 E) No. 19 Kansas; Second round	W 67–65	30–6	18 – Tied	9 – Tied	4 – Tied	Viejas Arena (11,501); San Diego, CA
March 27, 2026*; 7:10 p.m., CBS	(5 E) No. 10	vs. (1 E) No. 1 Duke; Sweet Sixteen	L 75–80	30–7	17 – Ejiofor	8 – Ejiofor	6 – Ejiofor	Capital One Arena (19,445); Washington, D.C.
*Non-conference game. ^{#}Rankings from AP Poll. (#) Tournament seedings in parentheses. E=East. All times are in Eastern Time.

== Awards and honors ==
Preseason honors
Honors	Player	Position	Date awarded	Ref.
Preseason Big East Player of the Year	Zuby Ejiofor	F	October 21, 2025	
Preseason All-Big East First Team	Bryce Hopkins	G/F	October 21, 2025	
Preseason All-Big East Second Team	Ian Jackson	G	October 21, 2025	
Preseason All-Big East Third Team	Joson Sanon	G	October 21, 2025	

== Rankings ==
Ranking movements Legend: ██ Increase in ranking ██ Decrease in ranking — = Not ranked RV = Received votes
	Week																				
Poll	Pre	1	2	3	4	5	6	7	8	9	10	11	12	13	14	15	16	17	18	19	Final
AP	5	13	14	14	23	22	22	RV	RV	—	RV	RV	25	22	17	17	15	18	13	10	10
Coaches	6	11	16	15	22	21	20	RV	25	RV	RV	25	24	22	17	16	15	17	13	9	10
