= Bryce Hopkins =

American basketball player (born 2002)

No. 13 – Denver Nuggets
- Position: Power forward / small forward
- League: NBA

Personal information
- Born: September 7, 2002 (age 24) Downers Grove, Illinois, U.S.
- Listed height: 6 ft 7 in (2.01 m)
- Listed weight: 225 lb (102 kg)

Career information
- High school: Fenwick (Oak Park, Illinois)
- College: Kentucky (2021–2022); Providence (2022–2025); St. John's (2025–2026)
- NBA draft: 2026: 2nd round, 49th overall pick
- Drafted by: Denver Nuggets
- Playing career: 2026–present

Career history
- 2026–present: Denver Nuggets
- 2026–present: →Grand Rapids Gold

Career highlights
- First-team All-Big East (2023); Second-team All-Big East (2026)
- Stats at NBA.com
- Stats at Basketball Reference

Bryce Robert Hopkins (born September 7, 2002) is an American basketball player for the Denver Nuggets of the National Basketball Association (NBA), on a two-way contract with the Grand Rapids Gold of the NBA G League. He played college basketball for the Kentucky Wildcats, Providence Friars, and St. John's Red Storm. He was a consensus top-40 recruit and one of the top players in the 2021 class.

== High school career ==
Hopkins attended Fenwick High School in Oak Park, Illinois. As a senior, he averaged 24.4 points, 12.5 rebounds and three assists per game. Hopkins led Fenwick to the Chicago Catholic League championship and was named as 2020–21 MaxPreps Illinois High School Basketball Player of the Year.

Hopkins was a consensus four-star recruit and one of the top players in the 2021 class, according to major recruiting services. During his junior season, Hopkins committed to playing college basketball for Louisville but later flipped his recruitment to Kentucky on October 26, 2020.

College recruiting
Name	Hometown	School	Height	Weight	Commit date
Bryce Hopkins; PF	Oak Park, IL	Fenwick High School	6 ft 6.5 in (1.99 m)	215 lb (98 kg)	Oct 26, 2020
Bryce Hopkins; PF	Recruit ratings: Rivals: 247Sports: ESPN: (88)				
Overall recruit ranking: Rivals: 39 247Sports: 39 ESPN: 33
Note: In many cases, Scout, Rivals, 247Sports, On3, and ESPN may conflict in their listings of height and weight.; In these cases, the average was taken. ESPN grades are on a 100-point scale.; Sources: "Kentucky 2021 Basketball Commitments". Rivals.; "2021 Kentucky Wildcats Recruiting Class". ESPN.; "2021 Team Ranking". Rivals.

== College career ==
=== Kentucky ===
On November 9, 2021, Hopkins made his Kentucky debut against Duke. On February 23, 2021, Hopkins had his best game of his Kentucky career. Despite coming off the bench, Hopkins played 16 minutes and finished with 13 points and four rebounds leading Kentucky to a comeback victory over LSU. He made several noteworthy plays early in the second half to spark Kentucky's comeback win. As a freshman, he averaged 2.1 points, 1.4 rebounds, and 0.3 assists per game in a reserve role.

After the season, Hopkins entered the transfer portal.

=== Providence ===
On April 25, 2022 Hopkins transferred to Providence. Hopkins made his Providence debut on November 9, 2022, he scored 18 points and 6 rebounds in a 66–65 victory over Rider University. On December 20, he posted 29 points and 23 rebounds, in an 103–98 double overtime upset over the #24 ranked Marquette, setting single-game career marks in both categories. Hopkins' 23 rebound performance set a new Providence single-game rebound record. As a sophomore, he averaged 16.1 points, 8.5 rebounds, 2.3 assists per game, and accumulated 10 double-doubles in his collegiate season as a starter. Concluding the season, Hopkins was selected unanimously as a member of the All-Big East team for the 2022–23 season.

Following the hiring of coach Kim English, Hopkins announced his intention to stay at Providence for the 2023–24 season.

=== St. John's ===
After tearing his ACL in January 2024, Hopkins played sparingly during the 2023–24 and 2024–25 seasons at Providence. Following the conclusion of the 2024–25 season, he entered the transfer portal for the second time in his career and committed to play his final collegiate season at St. John's University.

== Professional career ==
On June 24, 2026, Hopkins was selected with the 49th overall pick by the Denver Nuggets in the 2026 NBA draft. Hopkins signed a two-way contract with the Nuggets on September 9.

== Career statistics ==
Legend
GP	Games played	GS	Games started	MPG	Minutes per game
FG%	Field goal percentage	3P%	3-point field goal percentage	FT%	Free throw percentage
RPG	Rebounds per game	APG	Assists per game	SPG	Steals per game
BPG	Blocks per game	PPG	Points per game	**Bold**	Career high

=== College ===
Year	Team	GP	GS	MPG	FG%	3P%	FT%	RPG	APG	SPG	BPG	PPG
2021–22	Kentucky	28	0	6.5	.429	.313	.538	1.4	0.3	0.1	0.1	2.1
2022–23	Providence	33	33	**34.9**	.452	.364	**.759**	8.5	2.3	0.8	**0.6**	15.8
2023–24	Providence	14	14	33.4	.429	.189	.655	**8.6**	1.4	1.0	0.3	15.5
2024–25	Providence	3	3	30.7	.400	**.400**	.750	7.7	**3.0**	1.0	0.0	**17.0**
2025–26	St. John's	**37**	**37**	28.8	**.469**	.363	.713	6.2	1.9	**1.1**	0.3	13.6
Career		115	87	25.7	.451	.324	.718	6.0	1.6	0.8	0.3	11.8
