= 2026 NCAA Division I men's basketball championship game =

2026 American collegiate basketball final

National championship game
UConn Huskies	Michigan Wolverines
Big East	Big Ten
(34–5)	(36–3)
63	69
Head coach: Dan Hurley	Head coach: Dusty May
- AP: 7
- Coaches: 7
- AP: 3
- Coaches: 3
	1st half	2nd half	Total
UConn Huskies	29	34	63
Michigan Wolverines	33	36	69
- Date: April 6, 2026
- Venue: Lucas Oil Stadium, Indianapolis, Indiana
- MVP: Elliot Cadeau, Michigan
- Favorite: Michigan by 6.5
- Referees: James Breeding, Jeffrey Anderson, Kipp Kissinger
- Attendance: 70,720
- National anthem: Brian Kelly

United States TV coverage
- Network: TBS; TNT; truTV; HBO Max; March Madness app and website
- Announcers: Ian Eagle, Bill Raftery, Grant Hill, and Tracy Wolfson

The 2026 NCAA Division I men's basketball championship game was the final game of the 2026 NCAA Division I men's basketball tournament. It determined the national champion for the 2025–26 NCAA Division I men's basketball season and was contested by the UConn Huskies from the Big East Conference and the Michigan Wolverines from the Big Ten Conference. The game was played on April 6, 2026, at Lucas Oil Stadium in Indianapolis, Indiana.

Michigan defeated UConn 69–63 to win its first national championship since 1989, ending a streak of four straight title game losses for the Wolverines as well as a 37-year championship drought. It was also the first championship won by a Big Ten team since their rival Michigan State in 2000, which ended a streak of seven consecutive title game losses for the Big Ten dating back to 2002. The victory by the Wolverines was also the Huskies' first-ever loss in the championship game, ending a six-game streak that dated back to UConn's first national championship in 1999. Michigan was also the first team ever to win a national championship with a starting lineup consisting entirely of players who started their college careers elsewhere.

== Participants ==
=== UConn Huskies ===
UConn entered the season seeking a rebound after a disappointing 2024–25 season, where it finished with a 24–11 overall and 14–6 Big East record, suffering a narrow loss to the eventual national champion Florida in the second round of the NCAA tournament, 77–75, that ended its three-peat bid. The Huskies did not participate in any early-season bracketed tournaments after they vowed to never participate in one again following their disappointing 8th-place finish in the 2024 Maui Invitational. Instead, they participated in several high-profile out-of-conference matchups against BYU, Arizona, Illinois, Texas and a re-match with Florida, finishing non-conference play 10–1. In Big East play, the Huskies finished 17–3, good for second place after St. John's. Similarly, in the Big East tournament, the Huskies were once again second-best to St. John's, losing to them in the championship game in blowout fashion.

Named a No. 2 seed in the East region, the Huskies defeated No. 15 seed Furman 82–71 in the first round, largely through 31 points and 27 rebounds from Tarris Reed. He became the first player since Bill Walton in 1972 to have at least 30 points, 20 rebounds and shoot 80% in an NCAA tournament game, as well as the first player since Elvin Hayes in 1968 to finish with at least 30 points and 25 rebounds. In the second round, the Huskies defeated No. 7 seed UCLA 73–57. In the Sweet Sixteen, the Huskies defeated No. 3 seed Michigan State 67–63, surviving after blowing a 19-point lead. Against the overall No. 1 seed Duke in the Elite Eight, the Huskies came back from down 19 to win 73–72. In the final seconds of the game, Silas Demary Jr. deflected a pass from Duke's Cayden Boozer, leading to Braylon Mullins making a game-winning logo three with 0.4 seconds left. The "miracle" shot has been widely regarded as "one of the greatest shots in the history of the NCAA tournament."

In the Final Four, in a rematch from their prior meeting earlier in the season, the Huskies defeated Illinois 71–62. Entering the Championship game, they were seeking their third title in four seasons and to maintain their perfect 6–0 record in the National Championship games. Meanwhile, redshirt senior Alex Karaban was seeking to become the 10th men's player in NCAA Division I history to win three national championships, and the first to represent a program other than UCLA.

Mullins (who was named after Braylon Edwards) grew up in a household of Michigan Wolverines fans. Reed played his first two season of college basketball for Michigan.

=== Michigan Wolverines ===
Michigan entered the season looking to build off their 2024–25 season, where they finished with a 27–10 record, 14–6 in Big Ten conference play and won the Big Ten tournament before losing to the No. 1 overall seed Auburn in the Sweet Sixteen.

With the addition of new transfers Elliot Cadeau, Morez Johnson Jr., Aday Mara, and Yaxel Lendeborg, Michigan cruised to a 29–2 regular season record, winning the Big Ten regular season title. The Wolverines also swept both their rivals Michigan State and Ohio State, and went undefeated in conference play on the road for the first time in program history, becoming the first Big Ten team to accomplish such a feat since Indiana did so in 1976 as part of their undefeated championship season.

Despite losing the Big Ten tournament title to Purdue, Michigan still clinched the #1 seed in the Midwest region of the 2026 tournament at 31–3. In the first round, Michigan defeated #16 seed Howard by a 101–80 score after a slow start, then defeated Saint Louis by a 95–72 score in the second round. In the Sweet Sixteen against Alabama, Michigan trailed going into the second half, but rebounded to win 90–77. In the Elite Eight, the Wolverines routed Tennessee by a 95–62 score to reach their ninth Final Four in school history, their largest margin of victory in the Elite Eight since their championship run in 1989. As a result, Michigan became the first team to score at least 90 points in their first four tournament wins since they did so in 1989, and remain the only program to accomplish this feat. In the national semifinal matchup against Arizona, the Wolverines led the entire game as they blew out the Wildcats by a 91–73 score after leading by as much as 30 points. Michigan became the first program in tournament history to score at least 90 points in five games in a single NCAA tournament.

Michigan had lost in its last four championship game appearances going into this matchup (1992, 1993, 2013, 2018).

== Road to the championship game ==
Note: In all results below, the score of the finalist is given first

UConn		Round	Michigan	
Opponent	Result	NCAA tournament	Opponent	Result
E 15 Furman	82–71	First round	MW 16 Howard	101–80
E 7 UCLA	73–59	Second round	MW 9 Saint Louis	95–72
E 3 Michigan State	67–63	Sweet Sixteen	MW 4 Alabama	90–77
E 1 Duke	73–72	Elite Eight	MW 6 Tennessee	95–62
S 3 Illinois	71–62	Final Four	W 1 Arizona	91–73

== Game summary ==
External videos
- Video highlights on YouTube
- Full game broadcast by CBS on YouTube

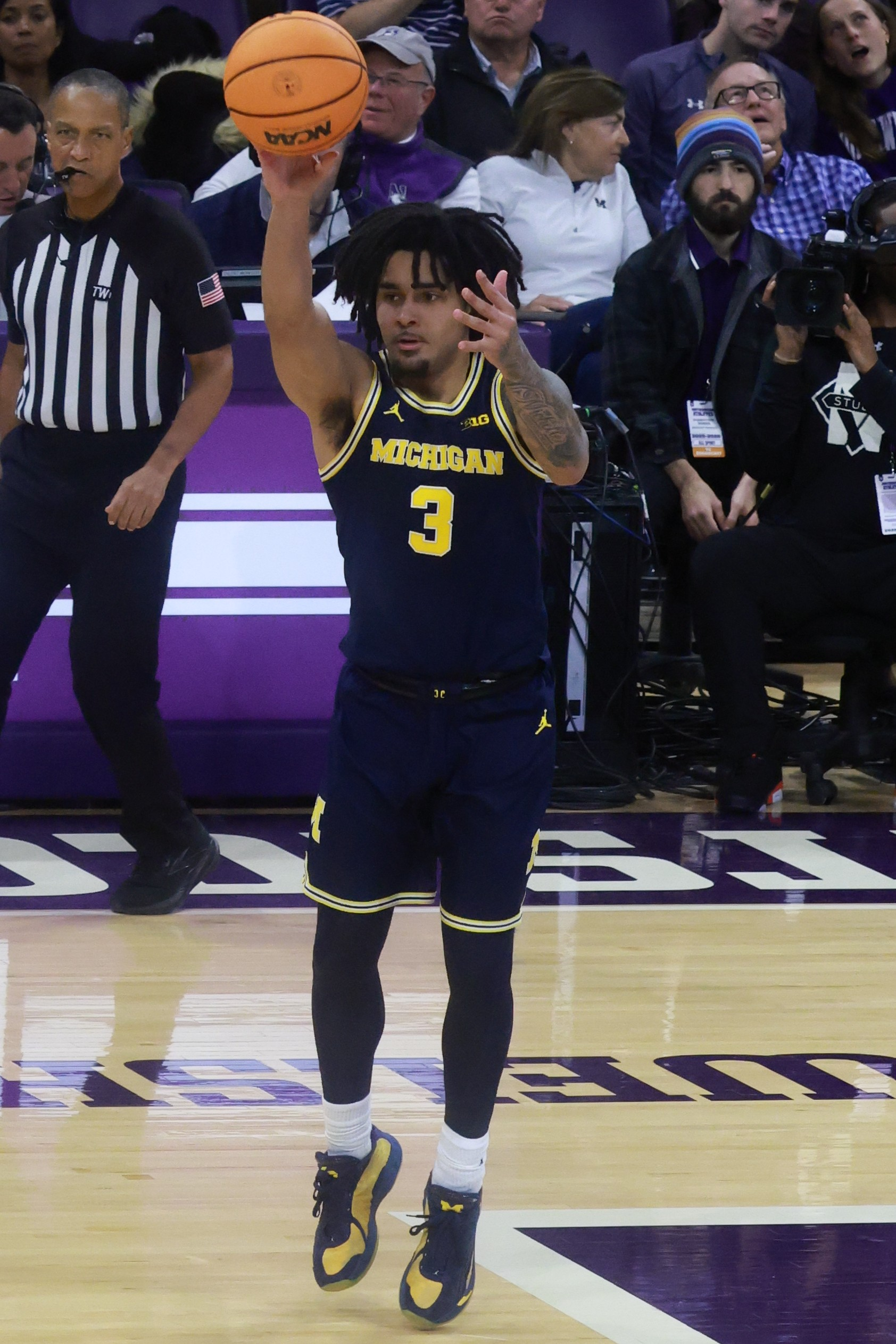
Elliot Cadeau was named the Most Outstanding Player.

Michigan defeated UConn 69–63 for the second title in program history. The victory denied the Huskies a third title in four seasons. The Wolverines' Elliot Cadeau had 19 points and was named the tournament's Most Outstanding Player. His teammate Morez Johnson Jr. tallied 12 points and 10 rebounds and Yaxel Lendeborg, limited by injuries, added 13 points. Michigan converted 25 out of 28 free-throw attempts. UConn's Alex Karaban led the Huskies with 17 points and 11 rebounds in his final college game, while Tarris Reed posted 13 points and 14 rebounds.

The opening half of the game saw Michigan going 0-for-8 from the three-point range while the Huskies' interior defense maintained control of the paint. The Wolverines' first major momentum shift came on a hook-and-hold flagrant foul against Karaban with 3 minutes and 16 seconds left in the first half, giving a 10–4 surge that led to Michigan taking the lead for good, with a 33–29 edge by the start of halftime.

Throughout the game, the Huskies were wracked with fouls, with Solo Ball, Silas Demary Jr., and Tarris Reed acquiring two each before the break. Cadeau made the Wolverines' first three-pointer of the game at the 12 minute and 56 second mark of the second half, which helped pushed the Wolverines' lead to 11. Michigan was just 2-for-15 from three-point range, but they held UConn to 31 percent from the field and 27 percent from three. At one point, the Huskies missed 13 three points attempts in a row. Michigan also combined for 61 points in the paint and from the free throw line, compared to 34 from UConn. Michigan outscored UConn by 14 points in the paint and converted 25 of 28 free throws.

UConn battled late despite facing foul trouble, cutting a once-11-point lead down to four with a three-pointer by Ball; however, a subsequent Karaban three-point attempt floundered, allowing Michigan to secure the victory at the free-throw line.

TBS/TruTV/HBO Max

April 6
8:50 p.m. EDT

#E2 UConn Huskies 63, #MW1 Michigan Wolverines 69
Scoring by half: 29–33, 34–36
Pts: Alex Karaban – 17; Rebs: Tarris Reed – 14; Asts: Malachi Smith – 3	Pts: Elliot Cadeau – 19; Rebs: Morez Johnson Jr. – 10; Asts: Elliot Cadeau, Roddy Gayle Jr. – 2

Lucas Oil Stadium – Indianapolis, Indiana
Attendance: 70,720
Referees: James Breeding, Jeffrey Anderson, Kipp Kissinger

Starters:			Pts	Reb	Ast
F	11	Alex Karaban	17	11	2
C	5	Tarris Reed Jr.	13	14	0
G	24	Braylon Mullins	11	7	2
G	2	Silas Demary Jr.	2	2	2
G	1	Solo Ball	11	0	0
Reserves:					
F	23	Jayden Ross	3	4	0
F	3	Jaylin Stewart	0	2	0
C	12	Eric Reibe	0	0	0
G	0	Malachi Smith	6	3	3
Head coach:
Dan Hurley

UConn	Michigan

UConn	Statistics	Michigan
21/68 (31%)	Field goals	21/55 (38%)
9/33 (27%)	3-pt field goals	2/15 (13%)
12/16 (75%)	Free throws	25/28 (89%)
22	Offensive rebounds	12
24	Defensive rebounds	27
46	Total rebounds	39
9	Assists	7
11	Turnovers	10
4	Steals	6
2	Blocks	6
22	Fouls	13

Starters:			Pts	Reb	Ast
F	23	Yaxel Lendeborg	13	2	1
F	21	Morez Johnson Jr.	12	10	0
C	15	Aday Mara	8	4	1
G	3	Elliot Cadeau	19	3	2
G	4	Nimari Burnett	4	4	0
Reserves:					
F	42	Will Tschetter	0	1	0
G	11	Roddy Gayle Jr.	4	4	2
F	1	Trey McKenney	9	8	1
Head coach:
Dusty May

=== Final Four all-tournament team ===
- Elliot Cadeau (Most Outstanding Player) – Michigan
- Morez Johnson Jr. – Michigan
- Alex Karaban – UConn
- Aday Mara – Michigan
- Tarris Reed – UConn

== Media coverage ==
The championship game was televised in the United States by TBS and simulcast on TNT, TruTV, HBO Max, and the March Madness app and website. Ian Eagle called the play-by-play, while Bill Raftery and Grant Hill both provided color commentary. Tracy Wolfson performed sideline reporter duties.

== See also ==
- 2026 NCAA Division I women's basketball championship game
