= 2024–25 UConn Huskies men's basketball team =

American college basketball season

2024–25 UConn Huskies men's basketball

NCAA tournament, Second round
- Conference: Big East Conference
- Record: 24–11 (14–6 Big East)
- Head coach: Dan Hurley (7th season)
- Associate head coach: Kimani Young
- Assistant coaches: Tom Moore; Luke Murray
- Captain: Alex Karaban
- Home arena: Harry A. Gampel Pavilion; XL Center

2024–25 Big East men's basketball standings
| | Conf. | | | | Overall |
| Team | W | | L | PCT | W | | L | PCT |
|---|---|---|---|---|---|---|---|---|
| No. 11 St. John's † | 18 | – | 2 | .900 | 31 | – | 5 | .861 |
| Creighton | 15 | – | 5 | .750 | 25 | – | 11 | .694 |
| UConn | 14 | – | 6 | .700 | 24 | – | 11 | .686 |
| Xavier | 13 | – | 7 | .650 | 22 | – | 12 | .647 |
| Marquette | 13 | – | 7 | .650 | 23 | – | 11 | .676 |
| Villanova | 11 | – | 9 | .550 | 21 | – | 15 | .583 |
| Georgetown | 8 | – | 12 | .400 | 18 | – | 16 | .529 |
| Providence | 6 | – | 14 | .300 | 12 | – | 20 | .375 |
| Butler | 6 | – | 14 | .300 | 15 | – | 20 | .429 |
| DePaul | 4 | – | 16 | .200 | 14 | – | 20 | .412 |
| Seton Hall | 2 | – | 18 | .100 | 7 | – | 25 | .219 |
† 2025 Big East tournament winner Rankings from AP Poll

The 2024–25 UConn Huskies men's basketball team represented the University of Connecticut in the 2024–25 NCAA Division I men's basketball season. The Huskies were led by seventh-year head coach Dan Hurley in the team's fifth season since their return to the Big East Conference. The Huskies played their home games at the Harry A. Gampel Pavilion on-campus in Storrs, Connecticut and the XL Center in Hartford, Connecticut. The Huskies sought to become the first team to win three straight national championships since UCLA won seven straight championships from 1966–67 to 1972–73. However, after a rocky regular season that earned them a #8 seed in the 2025 NCAA tournament, UConn narrowly lost to the eventual champion Florida in the second round, 77–75, ending their three-peat bid.

== Previous season ==
The Huskies finished the season 37–3, 18–2 in Big East play to win the regular season championship. They defeated Xavier, St. John's, and Marquette to win the Big East tournament, receiving the conference's automatic bid to the NCAA tournament. They won the 2024 NCAA Division I men's basketball tournament, becoming the first back-to-back National Champions since Florida (who won the tournament in 2006 and 2007). They were the first team since the tournament expanded to 64 teams in 1985 (therefore requiring six victories to win the championship), to win every game by at least 14 points. That broke their own record of winning every game by 13 points, set the previous year. They set additional records in the NCAA tournament for largest combined margin of victory in all their games with 140 points; and by extension, the largest-average margin of victory of 23.3 points per game.

== Offseason ==
=== Departures ===
| Name | Number | Pos. | Height | Weight | Year | Hometown | Reason for departure |
|---|---|---|---|---|---|---|---|
| Tristen Newton | 2 | G | 6'5" | 195 | GS Senior | El Paso, TX | Graduated |
| Stephon Castle | 5 | G | 6'6" | 215 | Freshman | Covington, GA | Declared for 2024 NBA draft |
| Cam Spencer | 12 | G | 6'4" | 205 | GS Senior | Davidsonville, MD | Graduated |
| Andrew Hurley | 20 | G | 6'1" | 170 | Senior | Glastonbury, CT | Graduated |
| Donovan Clingan | 32 | C | 7'2" | 280 | Sophomore | Bristol, CT | Declared for 2024 NBA draft |
| Apostolos Roumoglou | 33 | G | 6'8" | 215 | Sophomore | Xanthi, Greece | Transferred to Richmond |
| Andre Johnson Jr. | 40 | G | 6'4" | 170 | Sophomore | Bristol, CT | Transferred to Utah Valley |

=== Incoming transfers ===
| Name | Number | Pos. | Height | Weight | Year | Hometown | Previous school |
|---|---|---|---|---|---|---|---|
| Tarris Reed | 5 | F | 6'10" | 265 | Junior | Branson, MO | Michigan |
| Aidan Mahaney | 20 | G | 6'3" | 180 | Junior | Moraga, CA | Saint Mary's |

=== Recruiting classes ===
==== 2024 recruiting class ====
College recruiting
| Name | Hometown | School | Height | Weight | Commit date |
|---|---|---|---|---|---|
| Liam McNeeley #30 SF | Richardson, TX | Montverde Academy | 6 ft 8 in (2.03 m) | 185 lb (84 kg) | Apr 26, 2024 |
| Liam McNeeley #30 SF | Recruit ratings: Rivals: 247Sports: ESPN: (93) | | | | |
| Ahmad Nowell #0 PG | Philadelphia, PA | Imhotep Institute Charter High School | 6 ft 1 in (1.85 m) | 180 lb (82 kg) | Jul 23, 2023 |
| Ahmad Nowell #0 PG | Recruit ratings: Scout: Rivals: 247Sports: ESPN: (88) | | | | |
| Isaiah Abraham #4 PF | Leesburg, VA | Paul VI High School | 6 ft 7 in (2.01 m) | 210 lb (95 kg) | Jul 14, 2023 |
| Isaiah Abraham #4 PF | Recruit ratings: Scout: Rivals: 247Sports: ESPN: (88) | | | | |
Overall recruit ranking: Rivals: 10 247Sports: 11
Note: In many cases, Scout, Rivals, 247Sports, On3, and ESPN may conflict in their listings of height and weight.; In these cases, the average was taken. ESPN grades are on a 100-point scale.; Sources: "2024 UConn Basketball Commitments". Rivals.; "2024 Team Ranking". Rivals.

==== 2025 Recruiting Class ====
College recruiting (2025)
| Name | Hometown | School | Height | Weight | Commit date |
|---|---|---|---|---|---|
| Braylon Mullins; SG | Greenfield, IN | Greenfield-Central High School | 6 ft 5 in (1.96 m) | 180 lb (82 kg) | Oct 23, 2024 |
| Braylon Mullins; SG | Recruit ratings: Rivals: 247Sports: ESPN: (88) | | | | |
| Eric Reibe; C | Potomac, MD | The Bullis School | 7 ft 0 in (2.13 m) | 235 lb (107 kg) | Oct 16, 2024 |
| Eric Reibe; C | Recruit ratings: Scout: Rivals: 247Sports: ESPN: (89) | | | | |
| Jacob Ross; SG | Bristow, VA | Southern California Academy | 6 ft 6 in (1.98 m) | 170 lb (77 kg) | May 28, 2025 |
| Jacob Ross; SG | Recruit ratings: Scout: Rivals: 247Sports: ESPN: (81) | | | | |
| Jacob Furphy; SF | Smithton, Tasmania | NBA Global Academy | 6 ft 4 in (1.93 m) | 220 lb (100 kg) | Oct 29, 2024 |
| Jacob Furphy; SF | Recruit ratings: Scout: Rivals: 247Sports: ESPN: (80) | | | | |
Overall recruit ranking: Rivals: 12 247Sports: 9
Note: In many cases, Scout, Rivals, 247Sports, On3, and ESPN may conflict in their listings of height and weight.; In these cases, the average was taken. ESPN grades are on a 100-point scale.; Sources: "2025 UConn Basketball Commitments". Rivals.; "2025 Team Ranking". Rivals.

== Roster ==
2024–25 UConn Huskies men's basketball team
Players
Coaches

| Pos. | # | Name | Height | Weight | Year | Previous school | Hometown |
|---|---|---|---|---|---|---|---|
| G | 0 | Ahmad Nowell | 6 ft 0 in (1.83 m) | 195 lb (88 kg) | Fr | Imhotep Institute Charter | Philadelphia, PA |
| G | 1 | Solo Ball | 6 ft 3 in (1.91 m) | 190 lb (86 kg) | So | Brewster Academy | Leesburg, VA |
| F | 3 | Jaylin Stewart | 6 ft 7 in (2.01 m) | 215 lb (98 kg) | So | Garfield | Seattle, WA |
| F | 4 | Isaiah Abraham | 6 ft 7 in (2.01 m) | 205 lb (93 kg) | Fr | Paul VI | Gainesville, VA |
| C | 5 | Tarris Reed | 6 ft 10 in (2.08 m) | 260 lb (118 kg) | Jr | Michigan | Branson, MO |
| G | 10 | Hassan Diarra | 6 ft 2 in (1.88 m) | 195 lb (88 kg) | GS | Texas A&M | Queens, NY |
| F | 11 | Alex Karaban (C) | 6 ft 8 in (2.03 m) | 225 lb (102 kg) | RS Jr | IMG Academy | Southborough, MA |
| G | 20 | Aidan Mahaney | 6 ft 3 in (1.91 m) | 185 lb (84 kg) | Jr | Saint Mary's | Lafayette, CA |
| F | 23 | Jayden Ross | 6 ft 7 in (2.01 m) | 205 lb (93 kg) | So | Long Island Lutheran | Bristow, VA |
| C | 24 | Youssouf Singare | 6 ft 10 in (2.08 m) | 230 lb (104 kg) | So | Our Saviour Lutheran | Bamako, Mali |
| F | 30 | Liam McNeeley (injured) | 6 ft 7 in (2.01 m) | 210 lb (95 kg) | Fr | Montverde Academy | Richardson, TX |
| F | 35 | Samson Johnson | 6 ft 10 in (2.08 m) | 225 lb (102 kg) | Sr | The Patrick School | Lomé, Togo |
| G | 43 | Souleymane Diaby (W) | 6 ft 5 in (1.96 m) | 225 lb (102 kg) | Jr | SABIS International Charter | Springfield, MA |

Head coach

- Dan Hurley (Seton Hall)

Assistant coach(es)

- Kimani Young (UTEP)
- Tom Moore (Boston University)
- Luke Murray (Fairfield)

Legend

- (C) Team captain
- (S) Suspended
- (I) Ineligible
- (W) Walk-on
- Injured
- Current redshirt

Roster

== Schedule and results ==
| Date time, TV | Rank^{#} | Opponent^{#} | Result | Record | High points | High rebounds | High assists | Site (attendance) city, state |
Exhibition
| October 14, 2024*; 6:00 p.m., NBCSB | No. 3 | vs. Rhode Island; Basketball Hall of Fame Enshrinement Game | W 102–75 | | 18 – Ball | 10 – Reed Jr. | 9 – Diarra | Mohegan Sun Arena (7,953); Uncasville, CT |
Non-conference regular season
| November 6, 2024*; 7:00 p.m., FS1 | No. 3 | Sacred Heart | W 92–56 | 1–0 | 20 – Karaban | 11 – Reed Jr. | 7 – Karaban | Gampel Pavilion (10,299); Storrs, CT |
| November 9, 2024*; 8:00 p.m., FS2 | No. 3 | New Hampshire | W 92–53 | 2–0 | 17 – Karaban | 11 – McNeeley | 4 – Tied | XL Center (15,684); Hartford, CT |
| November 13, 2024*; 7:00 p.m., FS1 | No. 3 | Le Moyne | W 90–49 | 3–0 | 17 – Karaban | 10 – Reed Jr. | 6 – Diarra | XL Center (15,684); Hartford, CT |
| November 19, 2024*; 7:00 p.m., FS1 | No. 2 | East Texas A&M | W 81–46 | 4–0 | 12 – Ball | 10 – Reed Jr. | 3 – Tied | Gampel Pavilion (10,299); Storrs, CT |
| November 25, 2024*; 2:30 p.m., ESPN2 | No. 2 | vs. Memphis; Maui Invitational First round | L 97–99 ^{OT} | 4–1 | 22 – Reed Jr. | 11 – Reed Jr. | 6 – Karaban | Lahaina Civic Center (2,400); Lahaina, HI |
| November 26, 2024*; 3:30 p.m., ESPN2 | No. 2 | vs. Colorado; Maui Invitational Consolation Second round | L 72–73 | 4–2 | 20 – McNeeley | 5 – Tied | 6 – Diarra | Lahaina Civic Center (2,400); Lahaina, HI |
| November 28, 2024*; 12:00 a.m., ESPN2 | No. 2 | vs. Dayton; Maui Invitational 7th place game | L 67–85 | 4–3 | 21 – Karaban | 5 – Reed Jr. | 5 – Tied | Lahaina Civic Center (2,400); Lahaina, HI |
| November 30, 2024*; 7:00 p.m., Peacock | No. 2 | Maryland Eastern Shore | W 99–45 | 5–3 | 16 – Tied | 12 – Reed Jr. | 5 – Tied | XL Center (15,684); Hartford, CT |
| December 4, 2024*; 6:30 p.m., FS1 | No. 25 | No. 15 Baylor; Big East–Big 12 Battle | W 76–72 | 6–3 | 17 – McNeeley | 8 – McNeeley | 7 – Diarra | Gampel Pavilion (10,299); Storrs, CT |
| December 8, 2024*; 5:00 p.m., ESPN | No. 25 | at Texas | W 76–65 | 7–3 | 21 – Karaban | 11 – Karaban | 11 – Diarra | Moody Center (11,039); Austin, TX |
| December 14, 2024*; 8:00 p.m., FOX | No. 18 | vs. No. 8 Gonzaga; Hall of Fame Series New York City | W 77–71 | 8–3 | 26 – McNeeley | 8 – McNeeley | 7 – Diarra | Madison Square Garden (18,933); New York, NY |
Big East regular season
| December 18, 2024; 7:00 p.m., FS1 | No. 11 | Xavier | W 94–89 ^{OT} | 9–3 (1–0) | 22 – Ball | 13 – Reed Jr. | 11 – Diarra | XL Center (15,684); Hartford, CT |
| December 21, 2024; 12:00 p.m., Peacock | No. 11 | at Butler | W 78–74 | 10–3 (2–0) | 21 – Karaban | 6 – Tied | 7 – Tied | Hinkle Fieldhouse (9,100); Indianapolis, IN |
| January 1, 2025; 2:00 p.m., CBSSN | No. 11 | at DePaul | W 81–68 | 11–3 (3–0) | 22 – Ball | 7 – Tied | 9 – Diarra | Wintrust Arena (6,496); Chicago, IL |
| January 5, 2025; 2:00 p.m., NBC | No. 11 | Providence | W 87–84 | 12–3 (4–0) | 19 – Diarra | 5 – Reed Jr. | 8 – Diarra | Gampel Pavilion (10,299); Storrs, CT |
| January 8, 2025; 6:30 p.m., FS1 | No. 9 | at Villanova | L 66–68 | 12–4 (4–1) | 16 – Ball | 4 – Tied | 9 – Diarra | Finneran Pavilion (6,501); Villanova, PA |
| January 11, 2025; 2:15 p.m., FOX | No. 9 | at Georgetown; Rivalry | W 68–60 | 13–4 (5–1) | 19 – Karaban | 6 – Karaban | 4 – Tied | Capital One Arena (17,168); Washington, DC |
| January 18, 2025; 12:00 p.m., FOX | No. 14 | Creighton | L 63–68 | 13–5 (5–2) | 15 – Tied | 6 – Diarra | 7 – Diarra | Gampel Pavilion (10,299); Storrs, CT |
| January 21, 2025; 7:00 p.m., FS1 | No. 19 | Butler | W 80–78 ^{OT} | 14–5 (6–2) | 23 – Ball | 7 – Tied | 9 – Diarra | XL Center (15,684); Hartford, CT |
| January 25, 2025; 8:00 p.m., FOX | No. 19 | at Xavier | L 72–76 | 14–6 (6–3) | 20 – Ball | 11 – Ball | 4 – Diarra | Cintas Center (10,613); Cincinnati, OH |
| January 29, 2025; 8:00 p.m., Peacock | No. 25 | DePaul | W 72–61 | 15–6 (7–3) | 16 – Tied | 6 – Tied | 8 – Karaban | XL Center (15,684); Hartford, CT |
| February 1, 2025; 8:00 p.m., FOX | No. 25 | at No. 9 Marquette | W 77–69 | 16–6 (8–3) | 25 – Ball | 11 – Ball | 7 – Diarra | Fiserv Forum (18,129); Milwaukee, WI |
| February 7, 2025; 8:00 p.m., FOX | No. 19 | No. 12 St. John's | L 62–68 | 16–7 (8–4) | 18 – McNeeley | 15 – Reed Jr. | 3 – Tied | Gampel Pavilion (10,299); Storrs, CT |
| February 11, 2025; 9:00 p.m., CBSSN | | at No. 24 Creighton | W 70–66 | 17–7 (9–4) | 38 – McNeeley | 10 – McNeeley | 3 – Tied | CHI Health Center Omaha (18,025); Omaha, NE |
| February 15, 2025; 2:30 p.m., FOX | | at Seton Hall | L 68–69 ^{OT} | 17–8 (9–5) | 20 – Karaban | 9 – McNeeley | 5 – Diarra | Prudential Center (10,222); Newark, NJ |
| February 18, 2025; 6:30 p.m., FS1 | | Villanova | W 66–59 | 18–8 (10–5) | 20 – McNeeley | 9 – Reed Jr. | 6 – Ball | XL Center (15,684); Hartford, CT |
| February 23, 2025; 12:00 p.m., FOX | | at No. 10 St. John's | L 75–89 | 18–9 (10–6) | 17 – Karaban | 9 – McNeeley | 6 – Diarra | Madison Square Garden (19,812); New York, NY |
| February 26, 2025; 6:30 p.m., FS1 | | Georgetown; Rivalry | W 93–79 | 19–9 (11–6) | 20 – Tied | 10 – Reed Jr. | 7 – Diarra | XL Center (15,684); Hartford, CT |
| March 1, 2025; 12:00 p.m., CBS | | at Providence | W 75–63 | 20–9 (12–6) | 24 – Reed Jr. | 18 – Reed Jr. | 10 – Diarra | Amica Mutual Pavilion (12,400); Providence, RI |
| March 5, 2025; 8:30 p.m., FS1 | | No. 20 Marquette | W 72–66 | 21–9 (13–6) | 21 – Karaban | 11 – Johnson | 5 – Diarra | Gampel Pavilion (10,299); Storrs, CT |
| March 8, 2025; 2:30 p.m., FOX | | Seton Hall | W 81–50 | 22–9 (14–6) | 17 – Ball | 10 – Karaban | 6 – Diarra | Gampel Pavilion (10,299); Storrs, CT |
Big East tournament
| March 13, 2025; 10:18 p.m., FS1 | (3) | vs. (6) Villanova; Quarterfinal | W 73–56 | 23–9 | 18 – Karaban | 9 – Karaban | 6 – Karaban | Madison Square Garden (19,812); New York, NY |
| March 14, 2025; 9:30 p.m., FOX | (3) | vs. (2) Creighton; Semifinal | L 62–71 | 23–10 | 13 – Tied | 8 – Reed Jr. | 2 – Tied | Madison Square Garden (19,812); New York, NY |
NCAA Tournament
| March 21, 2025*; 9:25 p.m., TNT | (8 W) | vs. (9 W) Oklahoma; First round | W 67–59 | 24–10 | 14 – Ball | 7 – Tied | 4 – Diarra | Lenovo Center (19,178); Raleigh, NC |
| March 23, 2025*; 12:10 p.m., CBS | (8 W) | vs. (1 W) No. 3 Florida; Second round | L 75–77 | 24–11 | 22 – McNeely | 10 – Johnson | 5 – Diarra | Lenovo Center (19,244); Raleigh, NC |
*Non-conference game. ^{#}Rankings from AP Poll. (#) Tournament seedings in parentheses. W=West. All times are in Eastern Time.

== Rankings ==
Ranking movements Legend: ██ Increase in ranking ██ Decrease in ranking — = Not ranked RV = Received votes ( ) = First-place votes
| | Week | | | | | | | | | | | | | | | | | | | | |
| Poll | Pre | 1 | 2 | 3 | 4 | 5 | 6 | 7 | 8 | 9 | 10 | 11 | 12 | 13 | 14 | 15 | 16 | 17 | 18 | 19 | Final |
|---|---|---|---|---|---|---|---|---|---|---|---|---|---|---|---|---|---|---|---|---|---|
| AP | 3 (11) | 3 (7) | 2 (7) | 2 (6) | 25 | 18 | 11 | 11 | 11 | 9 | 14 | 19 | 25 | 19 | RV | RV | — | RV | RV | RV | RV |
| Coaches | 3 (6) | 3 (3) | 2 (3) | 2 (2) | RV | 20 | 13 | 14 | 13 | 10 | 13 | 18 | 24 | 18 | 24 | RV | RV | RV | RV | RV | RV |
