= 2025–26 UConn Huskies men's basketball team =

American college basketball season

2025–26 UConn Huskies men's basketball

NCAA tournament, Runners-up

National Championship Game, L 63–69 vs. Michigan
- Conference: Big East Conference

Ranking
- Coaches: No. 2
- AP: No. 2
- Record: 34–6 (17–3 Big East)
- Head coach: Dan Hurley (8th season)
- Associate head coach: Kimani Young
- Assistant coaches: Mike Nardi; Luke Murray
- Home arena: Harry A. Gampel Pavilion; PeoplesBank Arena

2025–26 Big East men's basketball standings
	Conf.				Overall
Team	W		L	PCT	W		L	PCT
No. 10 St. John's †	18	–	2	.900	30	–	7	.811
No. 2 UConn	17	–	3	.850	34	–	6	.850
Villanova	15	–	5	.750	24	–	9	.727
Seton Hall	10	–	10	.500	21	–	12	.636
Creighton	9	–	11	.450	16	–	18	.471
DePaul	8	–	12	.400	16	–	16	.500
Marquette	7	–	13	.350	12	–	20	.375
Butler	7	–	13	.350	16	–	16	.500
Providence	7	–	13	.350	15	–	18	.455
Xavier	6	–	14	.300	15	–	18	.455
Georgetown	6	–	14	.300	16	–	18	.471
† 2026 Big East tournament winner Rankings from AP poll

The 2025–26 UConn Huskies men's basketball team represented the University of Connecticut in the 2025–26 NCAA Division I men's basketball season. The Huskies were led by eighth-year head coach Dan Hurley in the team's sixth season since their return to the Big East Conference. The Huskies played their home games at Harry A. Gampel Pavilion on-campus in Storrs, Connecticut, and the PeoplesBank Arena in Hartford, Connecticut. This marked the first season that Tom Moore was not on the coaching staff since his second stint started during the 2018–19 season, moving to a general manager role. The Huskies finished the season as the NCAA tournament runners-up after losing to Michigan 69–63 in the National championship game.

== Previous season ==
The Huskies finished the season 24–11, 14–6 in Big East play, to finish 3rd in the regular season conference standings. They defeated Villanova 73–56 in the Big East tournament Quarterfinals before losing to Creighton in the semifinals, 71–62. UConn received an at-large bid to the NCAA tournament, where they were awarded a #8 seed. The Huskies sought to become the first team to win three straight national championships since UCLA won seven straight championships from 1966–67 to 1972–73. However, the team narrowly lost to the eventual national champion Florida in the second round, 77–75, ending their three-peat bid.

== Offseason ==
=== Departures ===
Name	Number	Pos.	Height	Weight	Year	Hometown	Reason for departure
Ahmad Nowell	0	G	6'0"	195	Freshman	Philadelphia, PA	Transferred to VCU
Isaiah Abraham	4	F	6'7"	205	Freshman	Gainesville, VA	Transferred to Georgetown
Hassan Diarra	10	G	6'2"	195	Graduate Student	Queens, NY	Graduated
Aidan Mahaney	20	G	6'3"	185	Junior	Lafayette, CA	Transferred to UC Santa Barbara
Youssouf Singare	24	F	6'10"	230	Sophomore	Bamako, Mali	Transferred to High Point
Liam McNeeley	30	F	6'7"	210	Freshman	Richardson, TX	Declared for 2025 NBA draft; Selected 29th overall by the Charlotte Hornets
Samson Johnson	35	F	6'10"	225	Senior	Lomé, Togo	Graduated
Souleymane Diaby	43	F	6'5"	225	Junior	Springfield, MA	Walk-on; Not retained

=== Incoming transfers ===
Name	Number	Pos.	Height	Weight	Year	Hometown	Previous school
Malachi Smith	0	G	6'1"	180	(redshirt) Senior	Bronx, NY	Dayton
Silas Demary Jr.	2	G	6'4"	195	Junior	Raleigh, NC	Georgia

=== Recruiting Classes ===
==== 2025 Recruiting Class ====
College recruiting
Name	Hometown	School	Height	Weight	Commit date
Braylon Mullins; SG	Greenfield, IN	Greenfield-Central High School	6 ft 5 in (1.96 m)	180 lb (82 kg)	Oct 23, 2024
Braylon Mullins; SG	Recruit ratings: Rivals: 247Sports: ESPN: (88)				
Eric Reibe; C	Potomac, MD	The Bullis School	7 ft 0 in (2.13 m)	235 lb (107 kg)	Oct 16, 2024
Eric Reibe; C	Recruit ratings: Rivals: 247Sports: ESPN: (89)				
Jacob Ross; SG	Bristow, VA	Southern California Academy	6 ft 6 in (1.98 m)	170 lb (77 kg)	May 28, 2025
Jacob Ross; SG	Recruit ratings: Rivals: 247Sports: ESPN: (81)				
Jacob Furphy; SF	Smithton, Tasmania	NBA Global Academy	6 ft 4 in (1.93 m)	220 lb (100 kg)	Oct 29, 2024
Jacob Furphy; SF	Recruit ratings: Rivals: 247Sports: ESPN: (80)				
Overall recruit ranking: Rivals: 12 247Sports: 9
Note: In many cases, Scout, Rivals, 247Sports, On3, and ESPN may conflict in their listings of height and weight.; In these cases, the average was taken. ESPN grades are on a 100-point scale.; Sources: "2025 UConn Basketball Commitments". Rivals.; "2025 Team Ranking". Rivals.

==== 2026 Recruiting Class ====
College recruiting (2026)
Name	Hometown	School	Height	Weight	Commit date
Colben Landrew; SG	Alabaster, AL	Wheeler (GA) High School	6 ft 6 in (1.98 m)	225 lb (102 kg)	Oct 25, 2025
Colben Landrew; SG	Recruit ratings: Rivals: 247Sports: ESPN: (89)				
Junior County; PG	Salt Lake City, UT	Wasatch Academy	6 ft 4 in (1.93 m)	180 lb (82 kg)	Oct 2, 2025
Junior County; PG	Recruit ratings: Rivals: 247Sports: ESPN: (88)				
Overall recruit ranking: Rivals: 10 247Sports: 28
Note: In many cases, Scout, Rivals, 247Sports, On3, and ESPN may conflict in their listings of height and weight.; In these cases, the average was taken. ESPN grades are on a 100-point scale.; Sources: "2026 UConn Basketball Commitments". Rivals.; "2026 Team Ranking". Rivals.

== Roster ==
2025–26 UConn Huskies men's basketball team
Players
Coaches

Pos.	#	Name	Height	Weight	Year	Previous school	Hometown
G	0	Malachi Smith	6 ft 1 in (1.85 m)	180 lb (82 kg)	RS Sr	Dayton	Bronx, NY
G	1	Solo Ball	6 ft 4 in (1.93 m)	200 lb (91 kg)	Jr	Brewster Academy	Leesburg, VA
G	2	Silas Demary Jr.	6 ft 4 in (1.93 m)	195 lb (88 kg)	Jr	Georgia	Raleigh, NC
F	3	Jaylin Stewart	6 ft 7 in (2.01 m)	225 lb (102 kg)	Jr	Garfield	Seattle, WA
F	4	Dwayne Koroma	6 ft 8 in (2.03 m)	212 lb (96 kg)	RS Sr	Le Moyne	Berlin, Germany
C	5	Tarris Reed	6 ft 11 in (2.11 m)	265 lb (120 kg)	Sr	Michigan	St. Louis, MO
G	7	Jacob Furphy	6 ft 6 in (1.98 m)	205 lb (93 kg)	Fr	Lake Ginninderra College	Smithton, Tasmania
G	9	Alec Millender	6 ft 1 in (1.85 m)	190 lb (86 kg)	GS	IU Indy	Glenwood, Illinois
C	10	Rrezon Elezaj	7 ft 2 in (2.18 m)	225 lb (102 kg)	Fr	Besiktas JK	Istanbul, Turkey
F	11	Alex Karaban (C)	6 ft 8 in (2.03 m)	230 lb (104 kg)	RS Sr	IMG Academy	Southborough, MA
C	12	Eric Reibe	7 ft 1 in (2.16 m)	260 lb (118 kg)	Fr	The Bullis School	Hannover, Germany
F	13	Jacob Ross	6 ft 5 in (1.96 m)	195 lb (88 kg)	Fr	SoCal Academy	Bristow, VA
F	23	Jayden Ross	6 ft 7 in (2.01 m)	205 lb (93 kg)	Jr	Long Island Lutheran	Bristow, VA
G	24	Braylon Mullins	6 ft 6 in (1.98 m)	195 lb (88 kg)	Fr	Greenfield-Central	Greenfield, Indiana
G	77	Uroš Paunović	6 ft 3 in (1.91 m)	190 lb (86 kg)	Jr	KK Zlatibor	Belgrade, Serbia

Head coach

- Dan Hurley (Seton Hall)

Assistant coach(es)

- Kimani Young (UTEP)
- Mike Nardi (Villanova)
- Luke Murray (Fairfield)

Legend

- (C) Team captain
- (S) Suspended
- (I) Ineligible
- (W) Walk-on
- Injured
- Current redshirt

Roster

== Schedule and results ==
Date time, TV	Rank^{#}	Opponent^{#}	Result	Record	High points	High rebounds	High assists	Site (attendance) city, state
Exhibition
October 13, 2025*; 7:00 p.m., NBCSB	No. 4	vs. Boston College; Hall of Fame Exhibition	W 71–52	–	17 – Karaban	11 – Karaban	5 – Smith	Mohegan Sun Arena (6,456); Uncasville, CT
October 28, 2025*; 7:30 p.m., WFSB	No. 4	No. 22 Michigan State	W 76–69	–	18 – Tied	7 – Reibe	3 – Tied	PeoplesBank Arena (15,495); Hartford, CT
Non-conference regular season
November 3, 2025*; 7:00 p.m., ESPN+	No. 4	New Haven; UConn MTE	W 79–55	1–0	19 – Karaban	10 – Karaban	4 – Smith	Gampel Pavilion (10,244); Storrs, CT
November 7, 2025*; 7:30 p.m., Peacock	No. 4	UMass Lowell; UConn MTE	W 110–47	2–0	20 – Reed Jr.	12 – Reed Jr.	7 – Demary Jr.	PeoplesBank Arena (15,495); Hartford, CT
November 10, 2025*; 6:30 p.m., FS1	No. 3	Columbia; UConn MTE	W 89–62	3–0	23 – Ball	8 – Reed Jr.	9 – Demary Jr.	Gampel Pavilion (10,244); Storrs, CT
November 15, 2025*; 7:00 p.m., FOX	No. 3	vs. No. 7 BYU; Hall of Fame Series – Boston	W 86–84	4–0	21 – 3 Tied	8 – Reed Jr.	7 – Demary Jr.	TD Garden (16,116); Boston, MA
November 19, 2025*; 7:00 p.m., FS1	No. 3	No. 4 Arizona	L 67–71	4–1	15 – Reibe	15 – Reibe	8 – Smith	Gampel Pavilion (10,244); Storrs, CT
November 23, 2025*; 6:00 p.m., TruTV	No. 3	Bryant	W 72–49	5–1	16 – Reibe	10 – Demary Jr.	10 – Demary Jr.	PeoplesBank Arena (15,495); Hartford, CT
November 28, 2025*; 12:30 p.m., FOX	No. 5	vs. No. 13 Illinois; SentinelOne Showdown	W 74–61	6–1	15 – Ball	9 – Karaban	9 – Smith	Madison Square Garden (16,154); New York, NY
December 2, 2025*; 9:00 p.m., ESPN2	No. 5	at No. 21 Kansas	W 61–56	7–1	17 – 2 Tied	8 – Reibe	4 – Demary Jr.	Allen Fieldhouse (15,300); Lawrence, KS
December 5, 2025*; 7:30 p.m., Peacock/NBCSN	No. 5	East Texas A&M	W 83–59	8–1	14 – Ball	7 – Stewart	5 – Demary Jr.	Gampel Pavilion (10,244); Storrs, CT
December 9, 2025*; 9:00 p.m., ESPN	No. 5	vs. No. 18 Florida; Jimmy V. Classic	W 77–73	9–1	19 – Ball	5 – Reed Jr.	9 – Smith	Madison Square Garden (19,694); New York, NY
December 12, 2025*; 8:00 p.m., FOX	No. 5	Texas	W 71–63	10–1	18 – Karaban	6 – Reed Jr.	9 – Smith	PeoplesBank Arena (15,495); Hartford, CT
Big East regular season
December 16, 2025; 8:30 p.m., Peacock/NBCSN	No. 5	Butler	W 79–60	11–1 (1–0)	26 – Ball	8 – Jay. Ross	11 – Demary Jr.	PeoplesBank Arena (15,495); Hartford, CT
December 21, 2025; 4:30 p.m., FS1	No. 5	at DePaul	W 72–54	12–1 (2–0)	21 – Karaban	11 – Reed Jr.	8 – Demary Jr.	Wintrust Arena (7,297); Chicago, IL
December 31, 2025; 5:00 p.m., Peacock/NBCSN	No. 4	at Xavier	W 90–67	13–1 (3–0)	19 – Karaban	8 – Reed Jr.	7 – Demary Jr.	Cintas Center (9,825); Cincinnati, OH
January 4, 2026; 2:00 p.m., NBC	No. 4	Marquette	W 73–57	14–1 (4–0)	17 – Ball	9 – Reed Jr.	3 – 4 Tied	Gampel Pavilion (10,299); Storrs, CT
January 7, 2026; 7:00 p.m., Peacock/NBCSN	No. 4	at Providence	W 103–98 ^{OT}	15–1 (5–0)	24 – Mullins	8 – Reed Jr.	15 – Demary Jr.	Amica Mutual Pavilion (11,789); Providence, RI
January 10, 2026; 12:30 p.m., TNT/TruTV	No. 4	DePaul	W 72–60	16–1 (6–0)	16 – Mullins	7 – Mullins	4 – Demary Jr.	PeoplesBank Arena (15,495); Hartford, CT
January 13, 2026; 8:00 p.m., TruTV	No. 3	at No. 25 Seton Hall	W 69–64	17–1 (7–0)	21 – Reed Jr.	9 – Reed Jr.	7 – Demary Jr.	Prudential Center (9,699); Newark, NJ
January 17, 2026; 12:00 p.m., FOX	No. 3	at Georgetown; Rivalry	W 64–62	18–1 (8–0)	15 – Reed Jr.	11 – Reed Jr.	5 – Demary Jr.	Capital One Arena (17,861); Washington D.C.
January 24, 2026; 12:30 p.m., FOX	No. 2	Villanova	W 75–67 ^{OT}	19–1 (9–0)	24 – Ball	11 – Reed Jr.	7 – Demary Jr.	PeoplesBank Arena (15,495); Hartford, CT
January 27, 2026; 7:30 p.m., TNT/TruTV	No. 2	Providence	W 87–81	20–1 (10–0)	19 – Reed Jr.	9 – Karaban	7 – Tied	Gampel Pavilion (10,244); Storrs, CT
January 31, 2026; 8:00 p.m., FOX	No. 2	at Creighton	W 85–58	21–1 (11–0)	16 – Mullins	6 – Tied	5 – Demary Jr.	CHI Health Center Omaha (18,650); Omaha, NE
February 3, 2026; 7:00 p.m., Peacock/NBCSN	No. 3	Xavier	W 92–60	22–1 (12–0)	17 – Demary Jr.	8 – Reed Jr.	8 – Demary Jr.	PeoplesBank Arena (15,495); Hartford, CT
February 6, 2026; 8:00 p.m., FOX	No. 3	at No. 22 St. John's	L 72–81	22–2 (12–1)	18 – Demary Jr.	7 – Demary Jr.	5 – Demary Jr.	Madison Square Garden (19,812); New York, NY
February 11, 2026; 7:30 p.m., TNT/TruTV	No. 6	at Butler	W 80–70	23–2 (13–1)	24 – Ball	10 – Reed Jr.	10 – Demary Jr.	Hinkle Fieldhouse (8,644); Indianapolis, IN
February 14, 2026; 8:00 p.m., Peacock/NBCSN	No. 6	Georgetown; Rivalry	W 79–75	24–2 (14–1)	20 – Ball	12 – Demary Jr.	9 – Demary Jr.	Gampel Pavilion (10,244); Storrs, CT
February 18, 2026; 7:00 p.m., TNT	No. 5	Creighton	L 84–91	24–3 (14–2)	25 – Mullins	12 – Reed Jr.	9 – Demary Jr.	Gampel Pavilion (10,244); Storrs, CT
February 21, 2026; 5:30 p.m., TNT/TruTV	No. 5	at Villanova	W 73–63	25–3 (15–2)	12 – Karaban	6 – Reed Jr.	6 – Demary Jr.	Xfinity Mobile Arena (20,261); Philadelphia, PA
February 25, 2026; 7:00 p.m., Peacock/NBCSN	No. 6	No. 15 St. John's	W 72–40	26–3 (16–2)	20 – Reed Jr.	11 – Reed Jr.	5 – Demary Jr.	PeoplesBank Arena (15,495); Hartford, CT
February 28, 2026; 12:00 p.m., FS1	No. 6	Seton Hall	W 71–67	27–3 (17–2)	23 – Karaban	11 – Reed Jr.	9 – Demary Jr.	Gampel Pavilion (10,244); Storrs, CT
March 7, 2026; 12:30 p.m., FOX	No. 4	at Marquette	L 62–68	27–4 (17–3)	17 – Demary Jr.	10 – Reed Jr.	8 – Demary Jr.	Fiserv Forum (16,283); Milwaukee, WI
Big East tournament
March 12, 2026; 7:00 p.m., FS1	(2) No. 6	vs. (10) Xavier; Quarterfinal	W 93–68	28–4	19 – Ball	14 – Reed Jr.	4 – Karaban	Madison Square Garden (19,812); New York, NY
March 13, 2026; 8:30 p.m., FS1	(2) No. 6	vs. (11) Georgetown; Semifinal / Rivalry	W 67–51	29–4	21 – Mullins	9 – Demary Jr.	8 – Reed Jr.	Madison Square Garden (19,812); New York, NY
March 14, 2026; 5:30 p.m., FOX	(2) No. 6	vs. (1) No. 13 St. John's; Championship	L 52–72	29–5	17 – Reed Jr.	7 – Reed Jr.	5 – Karaban	Madison Square Garden (19,812); New York, NY
NCAA tournament
March 20, 2025*; 10:00 p.m., TBS	(2 E) No. 7	vs. (15 E) Furman; First round	W 82–71	30–5	31 – Reed Jr.	27 – Reed Jr.	7 – Smith	Xfinity Mobile Arena (19,636); Philadelphia, PA
March 22, 2025*; 8:45 p.m., TNT	(2 E) No. 7	vs. (7 E) UCLA; Second round	W 73–57	31–5	27 – Karaban	13 – Reed Jr.	6 – Smith	Xfinity Mobile Arena (19,279); Philadelphia, PA
March 27, 2025*; 9:45 p.m., CBS	(2 E) No. 7	vs. (3 E) No. 11 Michigan State; Sweet Sixteen	W 67–63	32–5	20 – Reed Jr.	7 – Karaban	7 – Smith	Capital One Arena (19,445); Washington D.C.
March 29, 2026; 5:05 p.m., CBS	(2 E) No. 7	vs. (1 E) No. 1 Duke; Elite Eight	W 73–72	33–5	26 – Reed Jr.	9 – Reed Jr.	3 – Tied	Capital One Arena (19,502); Washington, D.C.
April 4, 2026; 6:09 p.m., TBS/truTV/HBO Max	(2 E) No. 7	vs. (3 S) No. 13 Illinois; Final Four	W 71–62	34–5	17 – Reed Jr.	11 – Reed Jr.	7 – Demary Jr.	Lucas Oil Stadium (72,111); Indianapolis, IN
April 6, 2026; 8:50 p.m., TBS/truTV/HBO Max	(2 E) No. 7	vs. (1 MW) No. 3 Michigan; National Championship	L 63–69	34–6	17 – Karaban	14 – Reed Jr.	3 – Smith	Lucas Oil Stadium (70,720); Indianapolis, IN
*Non-conference game. ^{#}Rankings from AP Poll. (#) Tournament seedings in parentheses. E=East region. S=South region. MW=Midwest region. All times are in Eastern Time.

== Rankings ==
Ranking movements Legend: ██ Increase in ranking ██ Decrease in ranking ( ) = First-place votes
	Week																				
Poll	Pre	1	2	3	4	5	6	7	8	9	10	11	12	13	14	15	16	17	18	19	Final
AP	4 (2)	3 (3)	3 (2)	5	5	5	5	4	4*	4	3	2	2	3	6	5	6	4	6	7	2
Coaches	4	3	3	7	5	5	5	4	4	4	4	3	3	3	5	5	6	4	6	7	2

*AP did not release a week 8 poll.
