= Tarris Reed Jr. =

American basketball player (born 2003)

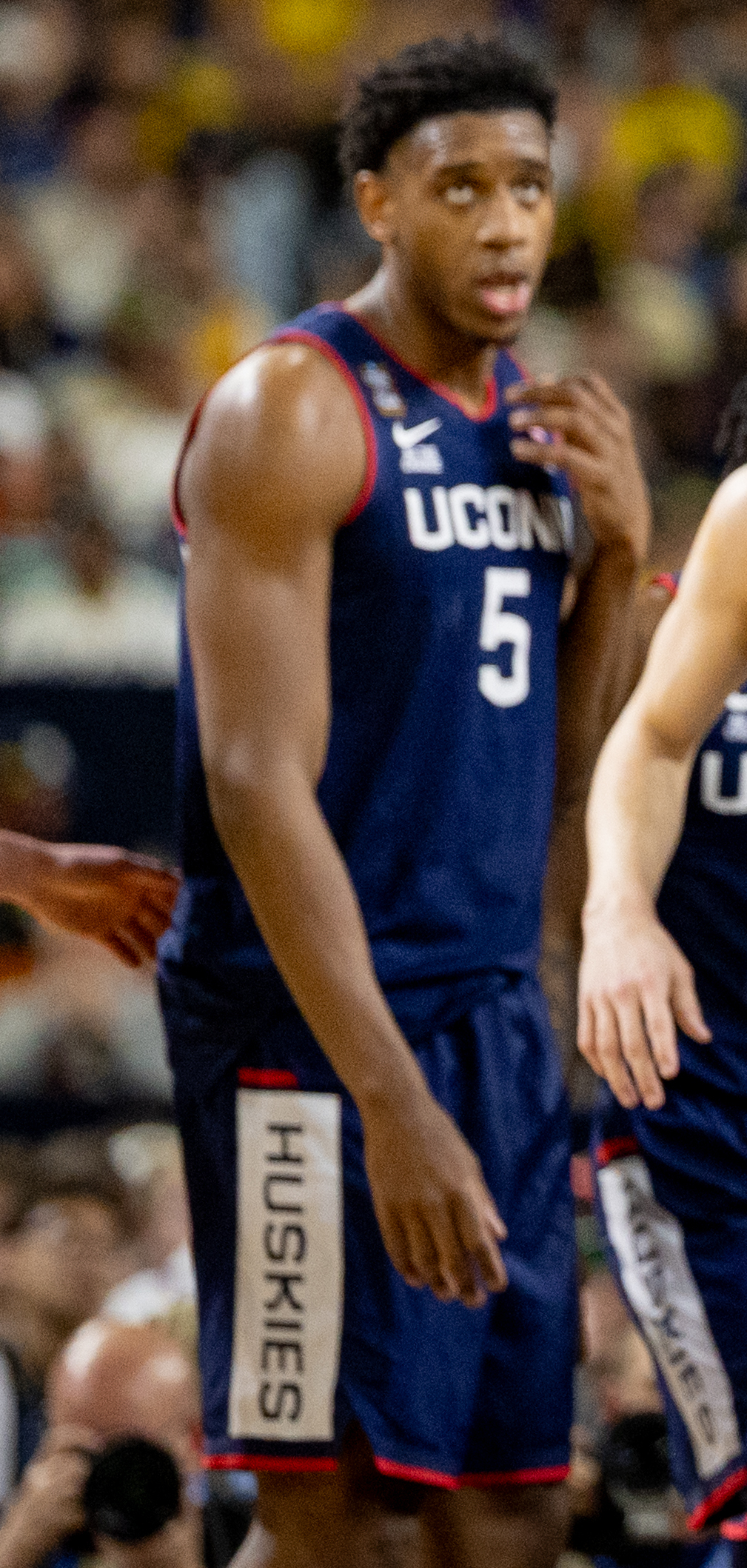
- Reed in 2026

No. 10 – San Antonio Spurs
- Position: Center
- League: NBA

Personal information
- Born: August 5, 2003 (age 23) St. Louis, Missouri, U.S.
- Listed height: 6 ft 10 in (2.08 m)
- Listed weight: 265 lb (120 kg)

Career information
- High school: Chaminade College Prep (Creve Coeur, Missouri); Link Year Prep Academy (Branson, Missouri)
- College: Michigan (2022–2024); UConn (2024–2026)
- NBA draft: 2026: 1st round, 26th overall pick
- Drafted by: Denver Nuggets
- Playing career: 2026–present

Career history
- 2026–present: San Antonio Spurs

Career highlights
- First-team All-Big East (2026); Big East Sixth Man of the Year (2025)
- Stats at NBA.com
- Stats at Basketball Reference

Tarris Alvence Reed Jr. (born August 5, 2003) is an American basketball player for the San Antonio Spurs of the National Basketball Association (NBA). He played college basketball for the Michigan Wolverines and UConn Huskies.

== Early life and high school ==
For his first three years of high school, Reed went to Chaminade College Preparatory School in St. Louis, Missouri. In his senior year he went to Link Academy in Branson, Missouri. As a sophomore, Reed averaged 14.5 points and 8.5 rebounds per game. As a junior, he averaged 21.8 points, 11.5 rebounds, 1.4 assists, and 2.6 blocks per game, earning him 2021 Greater St. Louis Player of the Year recognition from the St. Louis Post-Dispatch and The St. Louis American. Coming out of high school, Reed was rated a four-star recruit, the 13th ranked center, and the 69th overall player in the class of 2022. Reed committed to play college basketball for the Michigan Wolverines over offers from school such as Michigan State, Ohio State, Purdue, Florida, Illinois, Indiana and Kansas.

== College career ==
=== Michigan ===
Reed enrolled at the University of Michigan in 2022. He played sparingly his freshman season, but as a sophomore, Reed started 31 of 32 games, averaging 9.0 points per game, a team-high 7.2 rebounds per game, and 1.4 blocks per game on 51.9 percent shooting. He tallied 19 points, six rebounds and three blocks in a win over Iowa on December 10, 2023. On January 4, 2024, Reed recorded his first career double-double versus Minnesota, scoring 14 points and bringing down 11 rebounds. On January 18, he posted a career-high 20 points against Illinois. After the season, he entered the NCAA transfer portal.

=== UConn ===
Reed transferred to UConn in the spring of 2024. He received the Big East Conference Sixth Man of the Year award in 2025. Following the 2025–26 regular season, he was named first-team All-Big East, marking the first trio of first-team selections in the Big East from one team. He joined UConn teammates, Silas Demary Jr. and Alex Karaban.

On March 20, in the first round of the 2026 NCAA tournament against No. 15 seed Furman, Reed recorded 31 points and 27 rebounds, while shooting 12-of-15 from the field. He became the first player since Bill Walton in 1972 to have at least 30 points, 20 rebounds and shoot 80% in an NCAA tournament game. He was also the first NCAA tournament player since Elvin Hayes in 1968 to finish with at least 30 points and 25 rebounds. It marked the 2nd most rebounds in school history in the NCAA tournament, trailing only Toby Kimball 29 in the 1965 round of 32. He earned Most Outstanding Player for the East All-Region Team. Reed averaged 19.5 points and 13.2 rebounds in UConn's six-game tournament run. Following a loss in the 2026 NCAA Division I men's basketball championship game, he was named to the all-tournament team.

== Professional career ==
On June 23, 2026, Reed was selected with the 26th overall pick by the Denver Nuggets in the 2026 NBA draft then immediately traded to the San Antonio Spurs in exchange for pick 35 (Trevon Brazile) and two second-round picks. On October 20, 2026, Reed made his NBA debut against the Oklahoma City Thunder, where he logged in one minute of playtime in a 116-104 loss to the team.

== Career statistics ==
Legend
GP	Games played	GS	Games started	MPG	Minutes per game
FG%	Field goal percentage	3P%	3-point field goal percentage	FT%	Free throw percentage
RPG	Rebounds per game	APG	Assists per game	SPG	Steals per game
BPG	Blocks per game	PPG	Points per game	**Bold**	Career high

=== College ===
Year	Team	GP	GS	MPG	FG%	3P%	FT%	RPG	APG	SPG	BPG	PPG
2022–23	Michigan	34	0	12.6	.517	–	.400	3.9	.1	.5	.9	3.4
2023–24	Michigan	32	**31**	**26.6**	.519	**.333**	.586	7.2	.6	.5	1.4	9.0
2024–25	UConn	**35**	1	19.9	**.670**	–	**.644**	**7.3**	**1.0**	**.7**	**1.6**	**9.6**
Career		101	32	19.5	.579	.333	.563	6.1	.6	.6	1.3	7.3

== Personal life ==
Reed is the son of Tarris and Darlene Reed. He has two brothers: Trevor and Tristan. Reed is a Christian, on October 26, 2026, Reed was officially baptized.
