= Solo Ball =

American basketball player (born 2003)

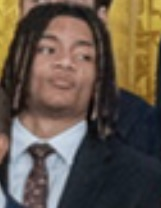
- Ball in 2024

No. 1 – UConn Huskies
- Position: Shooting guard
- League: Big East Conference

Personal information
- Born: December 7, 2003 (age 22)
- Listed height: 6 ft 4 in (1.93 m)
- Listed weight: 200 lb (91 kg)

Career information
- High school: Brewster Academy (Wolfeboro, New Hampshire)
- College: UConn (2023–2026)

Career highlights
- NCAA champion (2024); 2× Second-team All-Big East (2025, 2026)

Solomon Armstead Ball (born December 7, 2003) is an American college basketball player for the UConn Huskies of the Big East Conference.

== Early life and high school ==
Ball played high school basketball at St. James School and Brewster Academy. Coming out of high school, Ball received attention from mid-major schools and initially committed to play college basketball for the Richmond Spiders. In July 2022, he decided instead to play for UConn.

== College career ==
As a freshman in 2023–24, Ball averaged 3.3 points per game in 10 starts as he helped UConn win the National Championship. On November 6, 2024, he scored 16 points in a win over Sacred Heart. On January 1, 2025, Ball scored 22 points, knocking down a career-high seven threes, in a victory over DePaul. On February 1, he tallied 25 points and 11 rebounds in a win over Marquette, earning Big East player of the week honors. Ball averaged 14.4 points per game as a sophomore.

In the 2025–2026 season, Ball started all 39 games the Huskies played in their run to the national championship finals. He averaged 12.9 points, 3.1 rebounds and 1.6 assists for the season. On April 20, 2026, it was announced that Ball had undergone wrist surgery and would miss the entire 2026–27 season.

== Career statistics ==
Legend
GP	Games played	GS	Games started	MPG	Minutes per game
FG%	Field goal percentage	3P%	3-point field goal percentage	FT%	Free throw percentage
RPG	Rebounds per game	APG	Assists per game	SPG	Steals per game
BPG	Blocks per game	PPG	Points per game	**Bold**	Career high

=== College ===
Year	Team	GP	GS	MPG	FG%	3P%	FT%	RPG	APG	SPG	BPG	PPG
2023–24	UConn	**39**	10	11.5	.385	.319	.696	1.0	.3	.2	.0	3.3
2024–25	UConn	35	35	**31.7**	**.439**	**.414**	.841	**3.6**	**1.6**	**.7**	**.4**	**14.4**
2025–26	UConn	**39**	**39**	28.4	.392	.300	**.852**	3.0	1.5	.4	.2	12.8
Career		113	84	23.6	.411	.350	.832	2.5	1.1	.5	.2	10.0
