= Aidan Mahaney =

American basketball player (born 2003)

No. 20 – UC Santa Barbara Gauchos
- Position: Point guard
- Conference: Big West

Personal information
- Born: August 5, 2003 (age 23)
- Listed height: 6 ft 3 in (1.91 m)
- Listed weight: 185 lb (84 kg)

Career information
- High school: Campolindo (Moraga, California)
- College: Saint Mary's (2022–2024); UConn (2024–2025); UC Santa Barbara (2025–present)
- NBA draft: 2026: undrafted

Career highlights
- First-team All-Big West (2026); 2× First-team All-WCC (2023, 2024); WCC All-Freshman team (2023)

Aidan M. Mahaney (born August 5, 2003) is an American college basketball player. He played college basketball for the Saint Mary's Gaels, UConn Huskies and currently plays for the UC Santa Barbara Gauchos.

== Early life and high school career ==
Mahaney grew up in Lafayette, California and attended Campolindo High School. He started on the varsity team as a freshman and averaged 16 points per game as the Cougars won the Division II state championship. Mahaney averaged 19.4 points per game during his sophomore season. As a senior, he averaged 17.2 points, 3.9 assists, 3.7 rebounds, and 1.3 steals per game and was named the Bay Area News Group Player of the Year. Mahaney was rated a four-star recruit and committed to playing college basketball for Saint Mary's over offers from California, Stanford, and Princeton.

== College career ==
Mahaney entered his freshman season with Saint Mary's coming off the bench as a reserve guard. He made his college debut in SMC's season opener against Oral Roberts and scored 25 points in 26 minutes played. Mahaney became the team's starting point guard one month into the season. Mahaney scored 18 total points and 16 points in the second half and overtime in a 78–70 win over 12th-ranked Gonzaga. As a freshman, he averaged 13.9 points, 2.1 rebounds, and two assists per game and was named first-team All-WCC team and WCC All-Freshman team.

In his sophomore season, Mahaney helped lead the Gaels to WCC regular season and tournament titles. In the WCC championship game against Gonzaga, Mahaney scored 23 points as St. Mary’s won 69-60. Mahaney averaged 13.9 points, 2.6 rebounds, and 2.6 assists per game while garnering first team All-WCC honors. Following the end of the season, Mahaney announced he was entering the NCAA transfer portal.

Mahaney transferred to UConn for his junior season. After an underwhelming year with the Huskies, he transferred once more to UC Santa Barbara for his senior year. In October 2026, Mahaney was part of a California lawsuit that resulted in an injunction granting an additional year of NCAA eligibility to certain players from the high school class of 2022, allowing him to return and play a fifth season for the Gauchos.

== Professional career ==
After graduating from UCSB, Mahaney signed a summer league deal with the Minnesota Timberwolves before returning to UCSB for a fifth college season.

== Career statistics ==
Legend
GP	Games played	GS	Games started	MPG	Minutes per game
FG%	Field goal percentage	3P%	3-point field goal percentage	FT%	Free throw percentage
RPG	Rebounds per game	APG	Assists per game	SPG	Steals per game
BPG	Blocks per game	PPG	Points per game	**Bold**	Career high

=== College ===
Year	Team	GP	GS	MPG	FG%	3P%	FT%	RPG	APG	SPG	BPG	PPG
2022–23	Saint Mary's	**35**	26	30.5	.428	**.400**	.718	2.1	2.0	**.9**	**.1**	13.9
2023–24	Saint Mary's	34	**34**	33.3	.386	.355	**.813**	**2.6**	2.6	.8	**.1**	13.9
2024–25	UConn	34	5	12.4	.377	.359	.758	.8	1.3	.2	–	4.5
2025–26	UC Santa Barbara	32	32	**33.5**	**.435**	.385	.807	1.9	**2.7**	.8	**.1**	**14.9**
Career		135	97	27.3	.412	.376	.777	1.9	2.1	.7	.1	11.8

== Personal life ==
Mahaney's older brother, Carter, played college basketball at Northern Arizona.
