= Cayden Boozer =

American basketball player (born 2007)

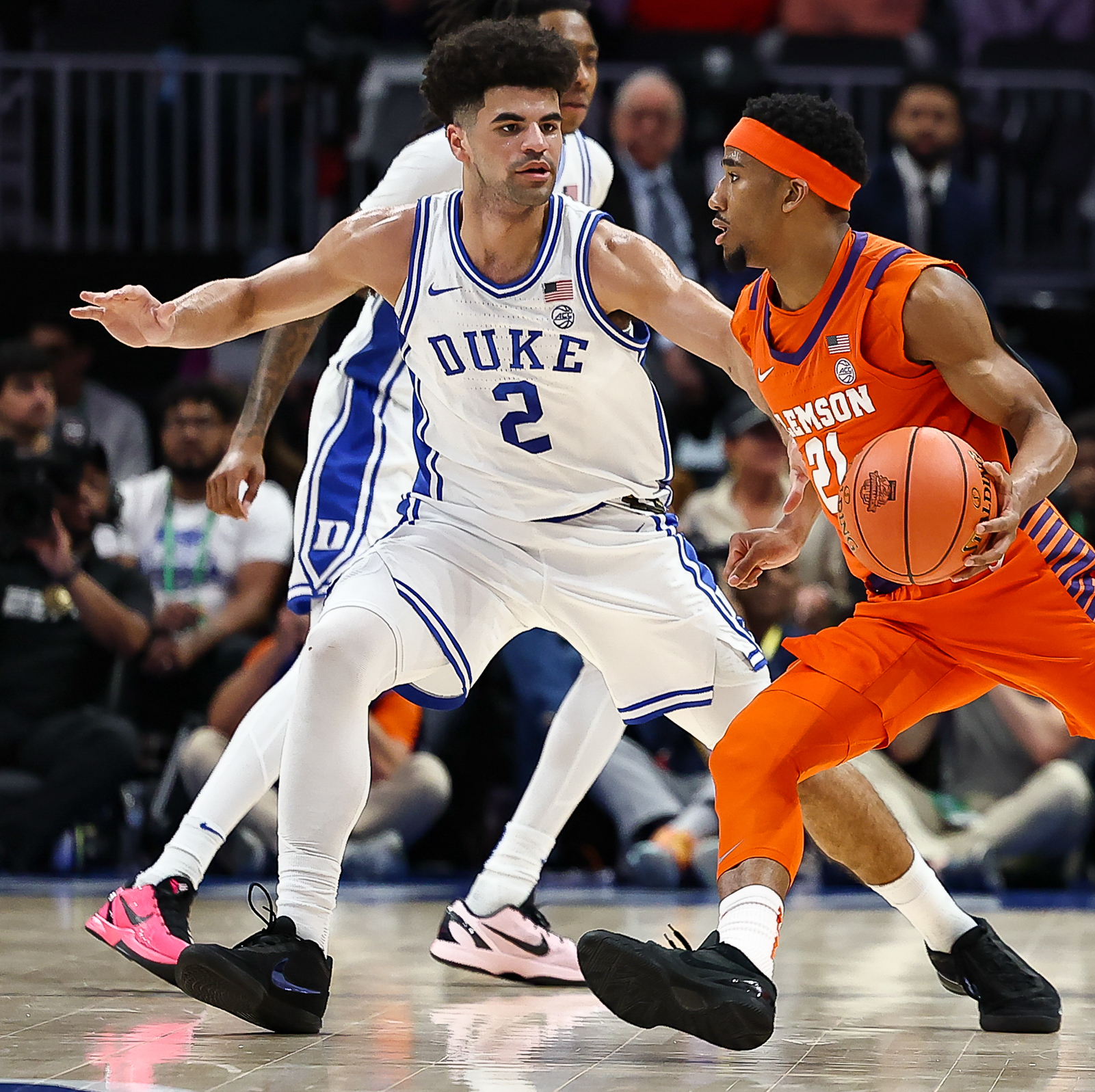
- Boozer in 2026

No. 2 – Duke Blue Devils
- Position: Point guard
- League: Atlantic Coast Conference

Personal information
- Born: July 18, 2007 (age 19) Salt Lake City, Utah, U.S.
- Listed height: 6 ft 4 in (1.93 m)
- Listed weight: 205 lb (93 kg)

Career information
- High school: Christopher Columbus (Westchester, Florida)
- College: Duke (2025–present)

Career highlights
- McDonald's All-American (2025); Nike Hoop Summit (2025)
Medals
Men's basketball
Representing United States
FIBA U17 World Cup
Gold medal – first place	2024 Turkey	Team
FIBA Under-16 Americas Championship
Gold medal – first place	2023 Mexico	Team

Cayden Boozer (born July 18, 2007) is an American college basketball player for the Duke Blue Devils of the Atlantic Coast Conference (ACC). He is the son of Carlos Boozer, who played in the National Basketball Association (NBA) for fourteen seasons.

== Early life and education ==
Boozer was born on July 18, 2007, in Salt Lake City, Utah, to former NBA All-Star Carlos Boozer and his then-wife Cece. Cayden and his fraternal twin brother, Cameron were conceived via in vitro fertilization after their older brother, Carmani, was diagnosed with sickle cell anemia; stem cells from the twins' umbilical cord blood were later used in Carmani's treatment. He grew up in Miami. They attended Pinecrest Elementary School.

Boozer attended Christopher Columbus High School in Westchester, Florida, alongside Cameron. He averaged 12 points, 2.7 rebounds, and 7.6 assists per game during his junior season. He was selected to play in the 2025 McDonald's All-American Boys Game during his senior year.

Boozer was a consensus five-star recruit and one of the top players in the 2025 class, according to major recruiting services, as is his twin brother. He and his brother both committed to play college basketball at Duke after considering offers from Miami (FL) and Florida. Boozer averaged 7.7 points, 3.0 assists and 2.3 rebounds per game while shooting 50 percent from the field during his first season. In the Elite Eight of the NCAA tournament against UConn, Dame Sarr passed the ball to Boozer with 6 seconds left and the Blue Devils up by two; instead of holding the ball, Boozer attempted a jumping pass over two defenders, which was deflected and stolen by Silas Demary Jr., allowing Braylon Mullins to hit a game-winning three-pointer.

== National team career ==
Boozer played for the United States in the 2023 FIBA Under-16 Americas Championship and averaged 7.0 points, 4.2 assists, and 1.8 steals across six games. Boozer played for the United States under-17 basketball team at the 2024 FIBA Under-17 Basketball World Cup. He averaged 4.9 points and 6.4 assists during the tournament as the United States won the gold medal.

== Personal life ==
Boozer played for the Duke Blue Devils of the Atlantic Coast Conference (ACC) along with his twin brother, Cameron.
