= Samson Johnson =

Togolese basketball player (born 2002)

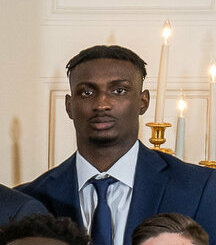
- Johnson in 2023

No. 34 – Rip City Remix
- Position: Power forward / center
- League: NBA G League

Personal information
- Born: July 28, 2002 (age 24) Lomé, Togo
- Listed height: 6 ft 10 in (2.08 m)
- Listed weight: 224 lb (102 kg)

Career information
- High school: The Patrick School (Hillside, New Jersey)
- College: UConn (2021–2025)
- NBA draft: 2025: undrafted
- Playing career: 2025–present

Career history
- 2025–2026: Noblesville Boom
- 2026–present: Rip City Remix

Career highlights
- 2× NCAA champion (2023, 2024)
- Stats at NBA.com
- Stats at Basketball Reference

Samson Roosevelt Faical Kuessi Johnson (born July 28, 2002) is a Togolese professional basketball player for the Rip City Remix of the NBA G League. He played college basketball for the UConn Huskies. Johnson was considered as the top incoming basketball recruit in UConn’s 2021 class.

== High school career ==
At The Patrick School, he played under coach Chris Chavannes who praised Johnson’s work ethic. He led his team to a 14–1 overall record. Johnson showed improvement as a junior as a role player on a team led by Adama Sanogo, who later completed an exceptional freshman season on the 2020–21 UConn Huskies men's basketball team. In October 2020, at a Slam16 all-star game at Gauchos Gym in The Bronx, Johnson wound up with 12 points, eight rebounds and six blocks to notch Co-Most Valuable Players honors for the game. He worked out with the Northeast Basketball Club, a program in northern New Jersey that often featured some of the state’s top committed prospects and current collegiate players.

=== Recruiting ===
In November 2020, Johnson signed his national letter of intent to play for UConn Huskies men's basketball program. A week after his recruitment, Johnson was rated as No. 39 in the nation (according to ESPN — ahead of both fellow UConn commits Rahsool Diggins and Jordan Hawkins, No.’s 56 and 57, respectively). Johnson moved up in the 247Sports recruiting site’s composite rankings, as well, from No. 76 back in November to No. 63.

== Player profile ==
Johnson’s former coach Chavannes reported, “you see a guy that can just dominate a game on both ends of the floor, in a matter of seconds. He can shoot the 3 in transition, follow-up dunks, clean up the boards, block shots. He can literally just dominate a game.”

Jay David, Johnson’s coach at the youth basketball program NY Jayhawks AAU stated “..he can guard multiple positions.” Yet, in May 2021, David stressed that Johnson needed to add more strength to compete better in the very physical Big East Conference.

== Professional career ==
=== Noblesville Boom (2025–2026) ===
On June 27, 2025, the Indiana Pacers signed Johnson to an Exhibit 10 contract. On September 27, he was waived by the Pacers. On October 27, the Noblesville Boom, the NBA G League affiliate of the Indiana Pacers, announced Johnson would be part of the 2025-2026 training camp roster. On November 5, the Boom announced Johnson would be on the 2025-2026 regular season roster.

== Career statistics ==
Legend
GP	Games played	GS	Games started	MPG	Minutes per game
FG%	Field goal percentage	3P%	3-point field goal percentage	FT%	Free throw percentage
RPG	Rebounds per game	APG	Assists per game	SPG	Steals per game
BPG	Blocks per game	PPG	Points per game	**Bold**	Career high

=== College ===
Year	Team	GP	GS	MPG	FG%	3P%	FT%	RPG	APG	SPG	BPG	PPG
2021–22	UConn	13	0	5.2	.556	**.200**	.500	1.1	.0	.1	.2	1.7
2022–23	UConn	12	1	3.9	.500	.000	**1.000**	.8	.1	.2	.0	.9
2023–24	UConn	**40**	7	16.0	.725	.000	.432	2.8	.5	.4	.9	5.4
2024–25	UConn	34	**34**	**19.4**	**.766**	—	.760	**3.5**	**1.0**	**.7**	**1.5**	**7.5**
Career		99	42	14.3	.728	.111	.630	2.6	.6	.4	.9	5.1
