= 2026 NCAA Division I men's basketball tournament =

United States top collegiate-level basketball tournament for 2026

- Season: 2025–26
- Teams: 68
- Finals site: Lucas Oil Stadium, Indianapolis, Indiana
- Champions: Michigan Wolverines (2nd title, 8th title game, 9th Final Four)
- Runner-up: UConn Huskies (7th title game, 8th Final Four)
- Semifinalists: Arizona Wildcats (5th Final Four); Illinois Fighting Illini (6th Final Four)
- Winning coach: Dusty May (1st title)
- MOP: Elliot Cadeau (Michigan)
- Top scorer: Tarris Reed Jr. (UConn) (117 points)

The 2026 NCAA Division I men's basketball tournament was an event involving 68 teams playing in a single-elimination tournament to determine the NCAA Division I men's college basketball national champion for the 2025–26 season. The 87th edition of the tournament began on March 17 and concluded with the championship game on April 6, at Lucas Oil Stadium in Indianapolis. The Michigan Wolverines won their second title, and the first under Dusty May. It was Michigan's first national championship since 1989, ending a streak of four straight title game defeats (two of which were vacated by the NCAA) for the Wolverines.

Atlantic Sun champion Queens and Western Athletic Conference (WAC) champion California Baptist made their tournament debuts. Queens qualified in its first year of eligibility, becoming only the fifth school since 1972 to achieve the feat.

Ohio Valley champion Tennessee State made its third-ever appearance, its first since 1994, while Big Sky champion Idaho made its first appearance since 1990. Coastal Athletic champion Hofstra made its first appearance since 2001. (Note: Hofstra had received an automatic bid to the 2020 tournament for winning that year's CAA tournament before the former was cancelled due to the COVID-19 pandemic.) Mid-American Conference (MAC) champion Akron and Southland champion McNeese each made their third consecutive tournament appearance.

For the first time since 2022 there was a Philadelphia Big 5 school in the tournament, with both Villanova and Penn qualifying. Teams from 33 U.S. states and the District of Columbia participated.

For the second consecutive season, all top four seeds advanced to the second round. This was the first time since the tournament expanded to 64 teams in 1985 that this had happened in consecutive seasons. The biggest upset in the first round was No. 5 seed Wisconsin losing to No. 12 seed High Point. Nebraska, High Point, Howard, and Prairie View A&M each earned their first ever tournament wins, although Howard and Prairie View A&M accomplished this in the First Four. Nebraska had previously been the only power conference team to have never won an NCAA tournament game. The average margin of victory in the first round was 17.4 points, the highest since the tournament expanded in 1985. This, coupled with higher seeds' tendency to win during the 2025 tournament, has led to a belief that mid-major programs are unable to compete with major conference programs in the NIL and transfer portal era. However, No. 1 overall seed Duke did get a challenge from No. 16 seed Siena, trailing by 13 points before recovering to win the game by six points. Additionally, for the 18th straight year, a double digit seed made the Sweet 16, although for the third consecutive year no 12-seed or lower team made the Sweet 16, and for the fourth consecutive year only one double digit seed made the Sweet 16. For the second straight season, no mid-major teams made the Sweet 16.

The Final Four comprised No. 1 seed Michigan, No. 1 seed Arizona, No. 2 seed Connecticut, and No. 3 seed Illinois. While Illinois was the lowest numbered seed to make the Final Four in two years, the Final Four was noted for not having a real Cinderella story.

This was the final tournament played under the 68-team format, as the NCAA voted to expand the tournament to 76 teams for the 2027 edition.

== Tournament procedure ==
A total of 68 teams entered the 2026 tournament. Thirty-one automatic bids were awarded to each program that won its conference's tournament. The remaining 37 teams received at-large bids, with selections extended by the NCAA selection committee on Selection Sunday (March 15). The selection committee also seeded the entire field from 1 to 68.

Eight teams (the four-lowest seeded automatic qualifiers and the four lowest-seeded at large-teams) played in the First Four. The winners of these games advanced to the main tournament bracket.

First four out
NET	School	Conference	Record
48	Oklahoma	SEC	19–15
38	Auburn	SEC	17–16
47	San Diego State	Mountain West	22–11
41	Indiana	Big Ten	18–14

== Schedule and venues ==
2026 First Four (orange) and first and second rounds (green)
2026 Regionals (blue) and Final Four (red)

The following sites were selected to host each round of the 2026 tournament:

First Four

- March 17 and 18
  - University of Dayton Arena, Dayton, Ohio (Host: University of Dayton)

First and second rounds (Subregionals)

- March 19 and 21
  - KeyBank Center, Buffalo, New York (Hosts: Metro Atlantic Athletic Conference, Canisius University, & Niagara University)
  - Bon Secours Wellness Arena, Greenville, South Carolina (Hosts: Furman University & Southern Conference)
  - Paycom Center, Oklahoma City, Oklahoma (Host: Big 12 Conference)
  - Moda Center, Portland, Oregon (Host: Oregon State University)
- March 20 and 22
  - Benchmark International Arena, Tampa, Florida (Host: University of South Florida)
  - Xfinity Mobile Arena, Philadelphia, Pennsylvania (Host: Saint Joseph's University)
  - Viejas Arena San Diego, California (Host: San Diego State University)
  - Enterprise Center St. Louis, Missouri (Host: Missouri Valley Conference)

Regional semifinals and finals (Sweet Sixteen and Elite Eight)

- March 26 and 28
  - South Regional
    - Toyota Center, Houston, Texas (Host: Rice University)
  - West Regional
    - SAP Center, San Jose, California (Host: San Jose State University)
- March 27 and 29
  - Midwest Regional
    - United Center, Chicago, Illinois (Host: Big Ten Conference)
  - East Regional
    - Capital One Arena, Washington, D.C. (Host: Georgetown University)

National semifinals and championship game (Final Four)

- April 4 and 6
  - Lucas Oil Stadium, Indianapolis, Indiana (Hosts: Horizon League and Indiana University Indianapolis)

Indianapolis will host the Final Four for the ninth time, having previously hosted in 2021.

== Qualification and selection of teams ==
Teams that participated in the 2026 tournament. South Region (red), East Region (blue), Midwest Region (yellow), and West Region (green)

=== Automatic qualifiers ===
Teams who won their conference championships (31) automatically qualify.

Automatic qualifiers in the 2026 NCAA Division I men's basketball tournament
Conference	Team	Appearance	Last bid
America East	UMBC	3rd	2018
American	South Florida	4th	2012
Atlantic 10	VCU	21st	2025
ACC	Duke	48th	2025
Atlantic Sun	Queens	1st	Never
Big 12	Arizona	40th	2025
Big East	St. John's	32nd	2025
Big Sky	Idaho	5th	1990
Big South	High Point	2nd	2025
Big Ten	Purdue	37th	2025
Big West	Hawai’i	6th	2016
CAA	Hofstra	5th	2001
CUSA	Kennesaw State	2nd	2023
Horizon	Wright State	5th	2022
Ivy League	Penn	25th	2018
MAAC	Siena	7th	2010
MAC	Akron	8th	2025
MEAC	Howard	5th	2024
Missouri Valley	Northern Iowa	9th	2016
Mountain West	Utah State	26th	2025
NEC	LIU	8th	2018
Ohio Valley	Tennessee State	3rd	1994
Patriot	Lehigh	6th	2012
SEC	Arkansas	37th	2025
Southern	Furman	8th	2023
Southland	McNeese	5th	2025
SWAC	Prairie View A&M	3rd	2019
Summit League	North Dakota State	5th	2019
Sun Belt	Troy	4th	2025
WAC	California Baptist	1st	Never
WCC	Gonzaga	28th	2025

=== Seeds ===
The tournament seeds and regions were determined through the NCAA basketball tournament selection process and were published by the selection committee after the brackets were released in March.

East Regional – Capital One Arena, Washington, D.C.
Seed	School	Conference	Record	Overall seed	Berth type	Last bid
1	Duke	ACC	32–2	1	Automatic	2025
2	UConn	Big East	29–5	6	At Large	2025
3	Michigan State	Big Ten	25–7	9	At Large	2025
4	Kansas	Big 12	23–10	15	At Large	2025
5	St. John's	Big East	28–6	18	Automatic	2025
6	Louisville	ACC	23–10	23	At Large	2025
7	UCLA	Big Ten	23–11	28	At Large	2025
8	Ohio State	Big Ten	21–12	31	At Large	2022
9	TCU	Big 12	22–11	34	At Large	2024
10	UCF	Big 12	21–11	38	At Large	2019
11	South Florida	American	25–8	46	Automatic	2012
12	Northern Iowa	Missouri Valley	23–12	49	Automatic	2016
13	California Baptist	WAC	25–8	51	Automatic	Never
14	North Dakota State	Summit	27–7	55	Automatic	2019
15	Furman	Southern	22–12	61	Automatic	2023
16	Siena	MAAC	23–11	63	Automatic	2010

West Regional – SAP Center, San Jose, CA
Seed	School	Conference	Record	Overall seed	Berth type	Last bid
1	Arizona	Big 12	32–2	2	Automatic	2025
2	Purdue	Big Ten	27–8	8	Automatic	2025
3	Gonzaga	WCC	30–3	11	Automatic	2025
4	Arkansas	SEC	26–8	16	Automatic	2025
5	Wisconsin	Big Ten	24–10	20	At Large	2025
6	BYU	Big 12	23–11	24	At Large	2025
7	Miami (FL)	ACC	25–8	27	At Large	2023
8	Villanova	Big East	24–8	30	At Large	2022
9	Utah State	Mountain West	28–6	33	Automatic	2025
10	Missouri	SEC	20–12	39	At Large	2025
11*	Texas	SEC	18–14	42	At Large	2025
11*	NC State	ACC	20–13	41	At Large	2024
12	High Point	Big South	30–4	50	Automatic	2025
13	Hawaii	Big West	24–8	54	Automatic	2016
14	Kennesaw State	CUSA	21–13	58	Automatic	2023
15	Queens	ASUN	21–13	62	Automatic	Never
16	LIU	NEC	24–10	64	Automatic	2018

South Regional – Toyota Center, Houston, TX
Seed	School	Conference	Record	Overall seed	Berth type	Last bid
1	Florida	SEC	26–7	4	At Large	2025
2	Houston	Big 12	28–6	5	At Large	2025
3	Illinois	Big Ten	24–8	10	At Large	2025
4	Nebraska	Big Ten	26–6	13	At Large	2024
5	Vanderbilt	SEC	26–8	17	At Large	2025
6	North Carolina	ACC	24–8	22	At Large	2025
7	Saint Mary's	WCC	27–5	26	At Large	2025
8	Clemson	ACC	24–10	29	At Large	2025
9	Iowa	Big Ten	21–12	36	At Large	2023
10	Texas A&M	SEC	21–11	40	At Large	2025
11	VCU	Atlantic 10	27–7	45	Automatic	2025
12	McNeese	Southland	28–5	47	Automatic	2025
13	Troy	Sun Belt	22–11	53	Automatic	2025
14	Penn	Ivy	18–11	56	Automatic	2018
15	Idaho	Big Sky	21–14	60	Automatic	1990
16*	Prairie View A&M	SWAC	18–17	68	Automatic	2019
16*	Lehigh	Patriot	18–16	67	Automatic	2012

Midwest Regional – United Center, Chicago, IL
Seed	School	Conference	Record	Overall seed	Berth type	Last bid
1	Michigan	Big Ten	31–3	3	At Large	2025
2	Iowa State	Big 12	27–7	7	At Large	2025
3	Virginia	ACC	29–5	12	At Large	2024
4	Alabama	SEC	23–9	14	At Large	2025
5	Texas Tech	Big 12	22–10	19	At Large	2025
6	Tennessee	SEC	22–11	21	At Large	2025
7	Kentucky	SEC	21–13	25	At Large	2025
8	Georgia	SEC	22–10	32	At Large	2025
9	Saint Louis	Atlantic 10	28–5	35	At Large	2019
10	Santa Clara	WCC	26–8	37	At Large	1996
11*	Miami (OH)	MAC	31–1	44	At Large	2007
11*	SMU	ACC	20–13	43	At Large	2017
12	Akron	MAC	29–5	48	Automatic	2025
13	Hofstra	CAA	24–10	52	Automatic	2001
14	Wright State	Horizon	23–11	57	Automatic	2022
15	Tennessee State	Ohio Valley	23–9	59	Automatic	1994
16*	UMBC	America East	24–8	66	Automatic	2018
16*	Howard	MEAC	23–10	65	Automatic	2024

*See First Four

== Tournament bracket ==
All times are listed in Eastern Daylight Time (UTC−4). Games on CBS are also on Paramount+, while games on TBS, TNT, and truTV are also on HBO Max.

=== Game summaries ===
==== First Four – Dayton, Ohio ====
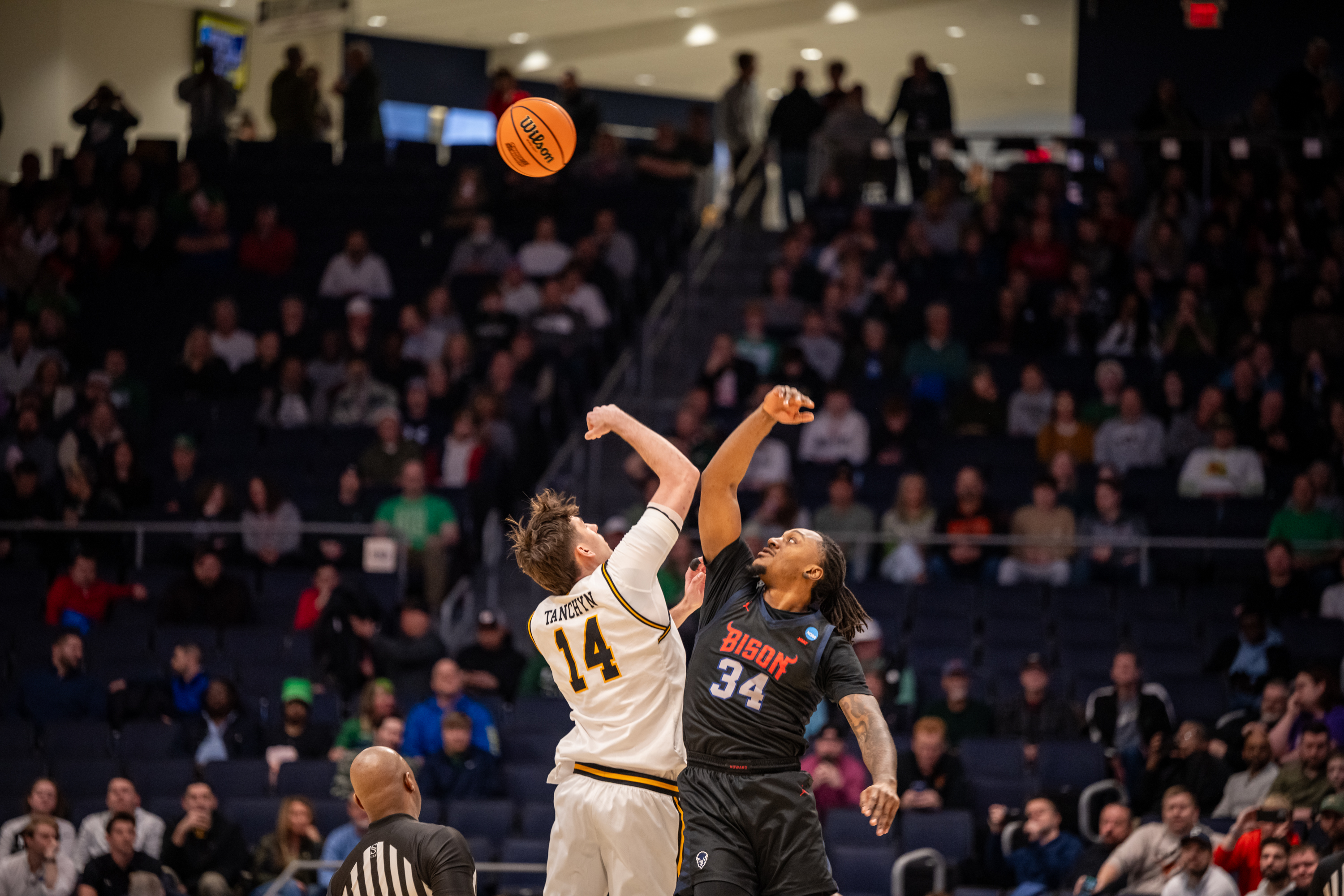
The opening tip of the first game of the tournament between UMBC and Howard on March 17, 2026

The First Four games involve eight teams: the four lowest-seeded automatic qualifiers and the four lowest-seeded at-large teams.

March 17 – Midwest Regional
16	UMBC	83
16	Howard	86

March 17 – West Regional
11	Texas	68
11	NC State	66

March 18 – South Regional
16	Prairie View A&M	67
16	Lehigh	55

March 18 – Midwest Regional
11	Miami (OH)	89
11	SMU	79

==== East regional – Washington, D.C. ====
First round Round of 64; March 19–20
1	Duke	71
16	Siena	65
Greenville – Thu/Sat
8	Ohio State	64
9	TCU	66
5	St. John's	79
12	Northern Iowa	53
San Diego – Fri/Sun
4	Kansas	68
13	California Baptist	60
6	Louisville	83
11	South Florida	79
Buffalo – Thu/Sat
3	Michigan State	92
14	North Dakota State	67
7	UCLA	75
10	UCF	71
Philadelphia – Fri/Sun
2	UConn	82
15	Furman	71

Second round Round of 32; March 21–22
1	Duke	81
9	TCU	58
5	St. John's	67
4	Kansas	65
6	Louisville	69
3	Michigan State	77
7	UCLA	57
2	UConn	73

Regional semifinals Sweet 16; March 27
1	Duke	80
5	St. John's	75
3	Michigan State	63
2	UConn	67

Regional Final; Elite 8 March 29
1	Duke	72
2	UConn	73

===== East regional final =====
CBS

March 29
5:05 p.m.

No. 1 Duke Blue Devils 72, No. 2 UConn Huskies 73
Scoring by half: 44–29, 28–44
Pts: Cameron Boozer, 27; Rebs: Cameron Boozer, 8 Asts: Cayden Boozer, 6	Pts: Tarris Reed, 26; Rebs: Tarris Reed, 9 Asts: Tarris Reed, 3

Capital One Arena – Washington, D.C.
Attendance: 19,502
Referees: Mike Reed, Tony Chiazza, Roger Ayers

==== East regional all-tournament team ====
- Tarris Reed (MOP) - UConn
- Cameron Boozer, Duke
- Cayden Boozer, Duke
- Zuby Ejiofor, St. John's
- Isaiah Evans, Duke

==== South regional – Houston, Texas ====
First round Round of 64; March 19–20
1	Florida	114
16	Prairie View A&M	55
Tampa – Fri/Sun
8	Clemson	61
9	Iowa	67
5	Vanderbilt	78
12	McNeese	68
Oklahoma City – Thu/Sat
4	Nebraska	76
13	Troy	47
6	North Carolina	78
11	VCU	82^{OT}
Greenville – Thu/Sat
3	Illinois	105
14	Penn	70
7	Saint Mary's	50
10	Texas A&M	63
Oklahoma City – Thu/Sat
2	Houston	78
15	Idaho	47

Second round Round of 32; March 21–22
1	Florida	72
9	Iowa	73
5	Vanderbilt	72
4	Nebraska	74
11	VCU	55
3	Illinois	76
10	Texas A&M	57
2	Houston	88

Regional semifinals Sweet 16; March 26
9	Iowa	77
4	Nebraska	71
3	Illinois	65
2	Houston	55

Regional Final; Elite 8 March 28
9	Iowa	59
3	Illinois	71

===== South regional final =====
TBS/truTV

March 28
6:09 p.m.

No. 3 Illinois Fighting Illini 71, No. 9 Iowa Hawkeyes 59
Scoring by half: 28–32, 43–27
Pts: Keaton Wagler, 25; Rebs: David Mirkovic, 12; Asts: Keaton Wagler, 3	Pts: Bennett Stirtz, 24; Rebs: Cam Manyawu, 5 Asts: Tied, 3

Toyota Center – Houston, Texas
Attendance: 17,010
Referees: John Gaffney, Michael Irving, Tony Padilla

==== South regional all-tournament team ====
- Keaton Wagler (MOP) - Illinois
- David Mirković, Illinois
- Andrej Stojaković, Illinois
- Bennett Stirtz, Iowa
- Pryce Sandfort, Nebraska

==== West regional – San Jose, California ====
First round Round of 64; March 19–20
1	Arizona	92
16	LIU	58
San Diego – Fri/Sun
8	Villanova	76
9	Utah State	86
5	Wisconsin	82
12	High Point	83
Portland – Thu/Sat
4	Arkansas	97
13	Hawai’i	78
6	BYU	71
11	Texas	79
Portland – Thu/Sat
3	Gonzaga	73
14	Kennesaw State	64
7	Miami (FL)	80
10	Missouri	66
St. Louis – Fri/Sun
2	Purdue	104
15	Queens	71

Second round Round of 32; March 21–22
1	Arizona	78
9	Utah State	66
12	High Point	88
4	Arkansas	94
11	Texas	74
3	Gonzaga	68
7	Miami (FL)	69
2	Purdue	79

Regional semifinals Sweet 16; March 26
1	Arizona	109
4	Arkansas	88
11	Texas	77
2	Purdue	79

Regional Final; Elite 8 March 28
1	Arizona	79
2	Purdue	64

===== West regional final =====
TBS/truTV

March 28
8:49 p.m.

No. 1 Arizona Wildcats 79, No. 2 Purdue Boilermakers 64
Scoring by half: 31–38, 48–26
Pts: Koa Peat, 20; Rebs: Motiejus Krivas, 12; Asts: Jaden Bradley, 6	Pts: Oscar Cluff, 14; Rebs: Oscar Cluff, 10; Asts: Braden Smith, 7

SAP Center – San Jose, California
Attendance: 15,854
Referees: DJ Carstensen, Michael Greenstein, Joe Lindsay

==== West regional all-tournament team ====
- Koa Peat (MOP) - Arizona
- Jaden Bradley, Arizona
- Trey Kaufman-Renn, Purdue
- Tramon Mark, Texas
- Braden Smith, Purdue

==== Midwest regional – Chicago, Illinois ====
First round Round of 64; March 19–20
1	Michigan	101
16	Howard	80
Buffalo – Thu/Sat
8	Georgia	77
9	Saint Louis	102
5	Texas Tech	91
12	Akron	71
Tampa – Fri/Sun
4	Alabama	90
13	Hofstra	70
6	Tennessee	78
11	Miami (OH)	56
Philadelphia – Fri/Sun
3	Virginia	82
14	Wright State	73
7	Kentucky	89^{OT}
10	Santa Clara	84
St. Louis – Fri/Sun
2	Iowa State	108
15	Tennessee State	74

Second round Round of 32; March 21–22
1	Michigan	95
9	Saint Louis	72
5	Texas Tech	65
4	Alabama	90
6	Tennessee	79
3	Virginia	72
7	Kentucky	63
2	Iowa State	82

Regional semifinals Sweet 16; March 27
1	Michigan	90
4	Alabama	77
6	Tennessee	76
2	Iowa State	62

Regional Final; Elite 8 March 29
1	Michigan	95
6	Tennessee	62

===== Midwest regional final =====
CBS

March 29
2:15 p.m.

No. 1 Michigan Wolverines 95, No. 6 Tennessee Volunteers 62
Scoring by half: 48–26, 47–36
Pts: Yaxel Lendeborg, 27; Rebs: Tied, 7 Asts: Elliot Cadeau, 10	Pts: Ja'Kobi Gillespie, 21; Rebs: Tied, 7 Asts: Ja'Kobi Gillespie, 4

United Center – Chicago, Illinois
Attendance: 20,410
Referees: Gregory Nixon, Bart Lenox, Jeffrey Anderson

==== Midwest regional all-tournament team ====
- Yaxel Lendeborg (MOP) - Michigan
- Elliot Cadeau, Michigan
- Roddy Gayle Jr., Michigan
- Ja'Kobi Gillespie, Tennessee
- Labaron Philon Jr., Alabama

=== Final Four – Indianapolis, Indiana ===
During the Final Four round, regardless of the seeds of the participating teams, the champion of the overall top seed's region (No. 2 UConn, East Region) plays against the champion of the fourth overall top seed's region (No. 3 Illinois Fighting Illini, South Region), and the champion of the second overall top seed's region (No. 1 Arizona Wildcats, West Region) plays against the champion of the third-ranked top seed's region (No. 1 Michigan Wolverines, Midwest Region).

National Semifinals; Final Four; Saturday, April 4
E2	UConn	71
S3	Illinois	62
W1	Arizona	73
MW1	Michigan	91

National Championship Game; Monday, April 6
E2	UConn	63
MW1	Michigan	69

- Final Four (National semifinals)

TBS/TNT/TruTV/HBO Max

April 4
6:09 p.m.

E2 UConn Huskies 71, S3 Illinois Fighting Illini 62
Scoring by half: 37–29, 34–33
Pts: Tarris Reed, 17; Rebs: Tarris Reed, 11; Asts: Silas Demary Jr., 7	Pts: Keaton Wagler, 20; Rebs: Tied, 8 Asts: Keaton Wagler, 2

Lucas Oil Stadium – Indianapolis, Indiana
Attendance: 72,111
Referees: Ron Groover, Paul Szelc, Marques Pettigrew

TBS/TNT/TruTV/HBO Max

April 4
8:49 p.m.

W1 Arizona Wildcats 73, MW1 Michigan Wolverines 91
Scoring by half: 32–48, 41–43
Pts: Koa Peat, 16; Rebs: Koa Peat, 11; Asts: Tied, 1	Pts: Aday Mara, 26; Rebs: Aday Mara, 9 Asts: Elliot Cadeau, 10

Lucas Oil Stadium – Indianapolis, Indiana
Attendance: 72,111
Referees: Doug Sirmons, Keith Kimble, Doug Shows

- National championship (Final)

TBS/TNT/TruTV/HBO Max

April 6
8:50 p.m.

E2 UConn Huskies 63, MW1 Michigan Wolverines 69
Scoring by half: 29–33, 34–36
Pts: Alex Karaban, 17; Rebs: Tarris Reed, 14; Asts: Malachi Smith, 3	Pts: Elliot Cadeau, 19; Rebs: Morez Johnson Jr., 10; Asts: Tied, 2

Lucas Oil Stadium – Indianapolis, Indiana
Attendance: 70,720
Referees: James Breeding, Jeffrey Anderson, Kipp Kissinger

==== Final Four all–tournament team ====
- Elliot Cadeau – (MOP) Michigan
- Morez Johnson Jr. – Michigan
- Alex Karaban – UConn
- Aday Mara – Michigan
- Tarris Reed – UConn

== Record by conference ==
Conference	Bids	Record	Win %	FF	R64	R32	S16	E8	F4	CG	NC
Big Ten	9	21–8	.724	–	9	7	6	4	2	1	1
Big East	3	7–3	.700	–	3	2	2	1	1	1	–
Big 12	8	11–8	.579	–	8	6	3	1	1	–	–
ACC	8	6–8	.429	2	6	4	1	1	–	–	–
SEC	10	14–10	.583	1	10	8	4	1	–	–	–
Atlantic 10	2	2–2	.500	–	2	2	–	–	–	–	–
Big South	1	1–1	.500	–	1	1	–	–	–	–	–
Mountain West	1	1–1	.500	–	1	1	–	–	–	–	–
WCC	3	1–3	.250	–	3	1	–	–	–	–	–
MEAC	1	1–1	.500	1	1	–	–	–	–	–	–
SWAC	1	1–1	.500	1	1	–	–	–	–	–	–
MAC	2	1–2	.333	1	2	–	–	–	–	–	–
American	1	0–1	.000	–	1	–	–	–	–	–	–
Atlantic Sun	1	0–1	.000	–	1	–	–	–	–	–	–
Big Sky	1	0–1	.000	–	1	–	–	–	–	–	–
Big West	1	0–1	.000	–	1	–	–	–	–	–	–
CAA	1	0–1	.000	–	1	–	–	–	–	–	–
CUSA	1	0–1	.000	–	1	–	–	–	–	–	–
Horizon	1	0–1	.000	–	1	–	–	–	–	–	–
Ivy	1	0–1	.000	–	1	–	–	–	–	–	–
MAAC	1	0–1	.000	–	1	–	–	–	–	–	–
MVC	1	0–1	.000	–	1	–	–	–	–	–	–
NEC	1	0–1	.000	–	1	–	–	–	–	–	–
OVC	1	0–1	.000	–	1	–	–	–	–	–	–
Southern	1	0–1	.000	–	1	–	–	–	–	–	–
Southland	1	0–1	.000	–	1	–	–	–	–	–	–
Summit	1	0–1	.000	–	1	–	–	–	–	–	–
Sun Belt	1	0–1	.000	–	1	–	–	–	–	–	–
WAC	1	0–1	.000	–	1	–	–	–	–	–	–
America East	1	0–1	.000	1	–	–	–	–	–	–	–
Patriot	1	0–1	.000	1	–	–	–	–	–	–	–

- The FF, R64, R32, S16, E8, F4, CG, and NC columns indicate how many teams from each conference were in the First Four, round of 64, round of 32, Sweet 16 and Elite Eight (regional semifinals and finals), Final Four and championship game (national semifinal and final), and national champion, respectively. The sum of the number of teams a conference placed in each round therefore does not equal the number of bids a conference received.

== Tournament notes ==
=== Upsets ===
Per the NCAA, an upset occurs "when the losing team in an NCAA tournament game was seeded at least five seed lines better than the winning team". The 2026 tournament had a total of six upsets.

Upsets in the 2026 NCAA Division I men's basketball tournament
Round	West	East	Midwest	South
Round of 64	No. 12 High Point defeated No. 5 Wisconsin, 83–82; No. 11 Texas defeated No. 6 BYU, 79–71	None		No. 11 VCU defeated No. 6 North Carolina, 82–78 ^{OT}
Round of 32	No. 11 Texas defeated No. 3 Gonzaga, 74–68	None		No. 9 Iowa defeated No. 1 Florida, 73–72
Sweet 16	None			No. 9 Iowa defeated No. 4 Nebraska, 77–71
Elite 8	None			
Final 4	None			
National Championship	None			

== Media coverage ==
=== Television ===
CBS Sports and TNT Sports had US television rights to the tournament. As part of a cycle that began in 2016, TBS televised the 2026 Final Four and the National Championship Game, and is expected to end after this year following the closing of the Paramount Skydance acquisition of Warner Bros. Discovery expected in October 2026. With Skydance holding the entirety of the deal, it is expected the rotation will end and all Final Fours for the remainder of the Skydance deal with move to CBS.

In November 2025, TNT Sports and ESPN announced an agreement to allow ESPN's Dick Vitale to call a First Four game on truTV alongside TNT Sports' Charles Barkley. In addition, ESPN is the international broadcaster for the tournament with a world feed. In exchange, Vitale and Barkley called a December 13, 2025 regular season game on ESPN between Indiana and Kentucky.

CBS Mornings co-host and The NFL Today analyst Nate Burleson replaced Ernie Johnson for the first two weeks of the tournament, as Johnson announced his semi-retirement from hosting March Madness to focus on his increasing Inside the NBA duties for ESPN and ABC; the program is produced by Warner Bros. Domestic Television, which shares ownership with TNT Sports. Johnson continued to host the Final Four and National Championship Game.

==== Television channels ====
- Selection Show – CBS
- First Four – truTV
- First and Second Rounds – CBS, TBS, TNT, and truTV
- Regional Semifinals and Finals – CBS and TBS/truTV
- National Semifinals and Finals (Final Four and National Championship) – TBS, TNT, and truTV

==== Streaming ====
- HBO Max (only TBS, TNT, and truTV games), ad free tiers only.
- Paramount+ (only CBS games), ad free tiers only
- March Madness app and website (with TV Everywhere authentication)

==== Studio hosts ====
- Nate Burleson (New York City) – First and Second rounds and regionals
- Adam Zucker (New York City) – First and Second rounds
- Adam Lefkoe (Atlanta and Indianapolis) – First Four, First and Second rounds, regional semifinals and Final Four
- Ernie Johnson (Indianapolis) – Final Four and national championship game
- Jamie Erdahl (New York City) – First and Second rounds (game breaks)

==== Studio analysts ====
- Charles Barkley (New York City and Indianapolis) – First and Second rounds, regionals, Final Four and national championship game
- Seth Davis (Atlanta and New York City) – First and Second rounds
- Clark Kellogg (New York City and Indianapolis) – First and Second rounds, regionals, Final Four and national championship game
- Jamal Mashburn (Atlanta and Indianapolis) – First Four, First and Second rounds, regional semifinals and Final Four
- Renee Montgomery (New York City) – First and Second rounds
- Candace Parker (Indianapolis) – Final Four
- Bruce Pearl (Atlanta, New York City and Indianapolis) – First Four, First and Second rounds, regionals, Final Four and national championship game
- Jalen Rose (Atlanta and Indianapolis) – First Four, First and Second rounds, regional semifinals and Final Four
- Kenny Smith (New York City and Indianapolis) – First round, regionals, Final Four and national championship game
- Gene Steratore (New York City and Indianapolis) (Rules Analyst) – First Four, First and Second rounds, regionals, Final Four and national championship game
- Chris Webber (Indianapolis) – Final Four

==== Broadcast assignments ====
- Ian Eagle/Bill Raftery/Grant Hill/Tracy Wolfson – First and Second rounds in Greenville, South Carolina; East Regional at Washington, D.C.; Final Four and National Championship in Indianapolis, Indiana
- Brian Anderson or Jason Benetti/Jim Jackson/Allie LaForce – First and Second rounds in Buffalo, New York; West Regional at San Jose, California
  - Benetti called the First Round, while Anderson called the Second Round and the West Regional.
- Kevin Harlan/Robbie Hummel/Stan Van Gundy/Lauren Shehadi – First and Second rounds in San Diego, California; South Regional at Houston, Texas
- Andrew Catalon/Steve Lappas/Evan Washburn – First and Second rounds in Philadelphia, Pennsylvania; Midwest Regional at Chicago, Illinois
- Brad Nessler/Wally Szczerbiak/Jared Greenberg – First and Second rounds in Portland, Oregon
- Spero Dedes/Jim Spanarkel/Jon Rothstein – First and Second rounds in St. Louis, Missouri
- Brandon Gaudin/Chris Webber/Andy Katz – First and Second Rounds in Oklahoma City, Oklahoma
- Tom McCarthy/Candace Parker/Dan Bonner/AJ Ross – First and Second rounds in Tampa, Florida
- Jordan Kent/Jim Spanarkel/Jenny Dell – First Four first game during Tuesday session and both games during Wednesday session in Dayton, Ohio
- Brian Anderson/Charles Barkley/Dick Vitale/Jenny Dell – First Four second game during Tuesday session in Dayton, Ohio

=== Radio ===
Westwood One will have exclusive coverage of the entire tournament.

==== First Four ====
- Danny Reed and King McClure – Dayton, Ohio

==== First and Second rounds ====
- Jason Benetti/Patrick McCarthy/Sam Neidermann and Sarah Kustok – Buffalo, New York
- Noah Eagle and LaPhonso Ellis – Greenville, South Carolina
- Ted Emrich and Casey Jacobsen – Oklahoma City, Oklahoma
- Ryan Radtke and Austin Croshere – Portland, Oregon
- John Sadak and Tom Crean – Tampa, Florida
- Scott Graham and Jon Crispin – Philadelphia, Pennsylvania
- Kevin Kugler and P. J. Carlesimo – San Diego, California
- Nate Gatter/Tom Leach and Jordan Cornette – St. Louis, Missouri

==== Regional semifinals and finals ====
- Spero Dedes and Fran Fraschilla – South Regional at Houston, Texas
- Ryan Radtke and P. J. Carlesimo – West Regional at San Jose, California
- Kevin Kugler and Jordan Cornette – Midwest Regional at Chicago, Illinois
- Scott Graham and Tom Crean – East Regional at Washington, D.C.

==== National semifinals and finals ====
- Kevin Kugler, Robbie Hummel, P. J. Carlesimo, and Andy Katz – Final Four and National Championship at Indianapolis, Indiana

== Television ratings ==
=== Most watched tournament games ===
(#) Tournament seedings and region in parentheses.

Rank	Round	Date and time (ET)	Matchup			Network	Viewers (millions)	TV rating
1	National Championship Game	April 6, 8:50 p.m.	(1 MW) Michigan	69–62	(2 E) UConn	TNT	18.3	
2	Final Four Semifinals	April 4, 9:19 p.m.	(1 W) Arizona	73–91	(1 MW) Michigan	TBS	14.29	
3	Final Four Semifinals	April 4, 6:09 p.m.	(2 E) UConn	71–62	(3 S) Illinois	TBS	14.16	
4	Elite 8	March 29, 5:15 p.m.	(1 E) Duke	72–73	(2 E) UConn	CBS	13.4	
5	Second Round	March 22, 5:15 p.m.	(4 E) Kansas	65–67	(5 E) St. John's	CBS	10.58	
6	Elite 8	March 28, 5:15 p.m.	(1 W) Arizona	79–64	(2 W) Purdue	TBS	10.1	
7	Second Round	March 22, 2:45 p.m.	(2 MW) Iowa State	82–63	(7 MW) Kentucky	CBS	9.79	
8	Second Round	March 21, 5:15 p.m.	(1 E) Duke	81–58	(9 E) TCU	CBS	9.55	
9	Sweet 16	March 27, 7:10 p.m.	(1 E) Duke	80–75	(5 E) St. John's	CBS	9.37	
10	Second Round	March 21, 2:45 p.m.	(3 E) Michigan State	77–69	(6 E) Louisville	CBS	8.47	

== See also ==
- 2026 NCAA Division I women's basketball tournament
- 2026 NCAA Division II men's basketball tournament
- 2026 NCAA Division III men's basketball tournament
- 2026 NAIA men's basketball tournament
- 2026 National Invitation Tournament
- 2026 College Basketball Crown
