= Alex Karaban =

American basketball player (born 2002)

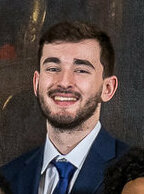
- Karaban at the White House in 2023

No. 33 – Sacramento Kings
- Position: Small forward / power forward
- League: NBA

Personal information
- Born: November 11, 2002 (age 24) Framingham, Massachusetts, U.S.
- Listed height: 6 ft 7 in (2.01 m)
- Listed weight: 220 lb (100 kg)

Career information
- High school: Algonquin Regional (Northborough, Massachusetts); New Hampton School (New Hampton, New Hampshire); IMG Academy (Bradenton, Florida)
- College: UConn (2022–2026)
- NBA draft: 2026: 1st round, 29th overall pick
- Drafted by: Cleveland Cavaliers
- Playing career: 2026–present

Career history
- 2026–present: Sacramento Kings
- 2026: →Stockton Kings

Career highlights
- 2× NCAA champion (2023, 2024); First-team All-Big East (2026); Second-team All-Big East (2025); Big East All-Freshman team (2023)
- Stats at NBA.com
- Stats at Basketball Reference

Alexander Karaban (born November 11, 2002) is an American basketball player for the Sacramento Kings of the National Basketball Association (NBA). He played college basketball for the UConn Huskies.

== Early life and high school career ==
Karaban was born to Alexi and Olga Karaban, immigrants from Belarus and Ukraine respectively. He has two siblings, younger sister Ana and younger brother Andrew. He grew up in Southborough, Massachusetts, and initially attended Algonquin Regional High School. He transferred to the New Hampton School in New Hampton, New Hampshire after his freshman year. Karaban was named the New Hampshire Gatorade Player of the Year as a junior after averaging 25.8 points, 8.7 rebounds, 2.9 assists, and 1.9 blocks per game. After two years at New Hampton, he transferred a second time to IMG Academy in Bradenton, Florida for one semester before leaving early for UConn. Karaban was rated a four-star recruit and committed to playing college basketball for UConn over offers from Stanford, Iowa, and Creighton.

== College career ==
Karaban accelerated his graduation at IMG Academy and enrolled at UConn in January 2022. He practiced with the team for the rest of the 2021–2022 season and redshirted the year. Karaban was a unanimous selection to the Big East Conference's All-Freshman team at the end of his redshirt freshman season. He started the 2023 national championship game and scored five points with five rebounds and three blocked shots as the Huskies won 76–59.

Karaban entered his sophomore year on the watchlist for the Karl Malone Award. He scored a career-high 22 points in the Huskies' season-opener against Northern Arizona as UConn won 95–52. Karaban averaged 13.3 points and 5.1 rebounds per game as UConn repeated as national champions. He initially declared for the 2024 NBA draft but ultimately decided to return for his redshirt junior season.

Karaban was one of the people that UConn coach Dan Hurley consulted when he was offered a head coaching job by the Los Angeles Lakers in June 2024.

During UConn's senior day on February 28, 2026, Karaban became the first men's player to have been inducted into the Huskies of Honor, an awards program honoring especially impactful players, teams, coaches, and administrators in both men's and women's basketball, while still active at UConn. (Note: Three other men's players (Kemba Walker, Shabazz Napier, and Tristen Newton), all of whom were named Final Four Most Outstanding Player as seniors on Huskies national championship teams, were inducted upon the Huskies' return from their respective tournament wins. Each of the three championship games was the last UConn game for the honored player.) By that time, he had become the Huskies' winningest men's player.

On March 29, 2026, Karaban passed the ball to Braylon Mullins for Mullins' "miracle" three-point shot that carried UConn over Duke in the 2026 NCAA Division I men's basketball tournament quarterfinal, 73–72.

== Professional career ==
On June 23, 2026, Karaban was selected by the Cleveland Cavaliers with the 29th overall pick in the 2026 NBA draft but was subsequently traded to the Sacramento Kings for pick 34 (Meleek Thomas) and a future second round pick.

== Career statistics ==
Legend
GP	Games played	GS	Games started	MPG	Minutes per game
FG%	Field goal percentage	3P%	3-point field goal percentage	FT%	Free throw percentage
RPG	Rebounds per game	APG	Assists per game	SPG	Steals per game
BPG	Blocks per game	PPG	Points per game	**Bold**	Career high

=== College ===
Year	Team	GP	GS	MPG	FG%	3P%	FT%	RPG	APG	SPG	BPG	PPG
2021–22	UConn	Redshirt										
2022–23	UConn	39	38	28.9	.476	**.402**	.809	4.5	1.7	.5	.7	9.3
2023–24	UConn	39	39	31.4	**.495**	.379	**.885**	5.1	1.5	**.9**	.8	13.3
2024–25	UConn	33	33	**35.9**	.438	.347	.828	**5.3**	**2.8**	.6	**1.5**	**14.3**
2025–26	UConn	**40**	**40**	34.3	.464	.374	.851	**5.3**	2.4	.8	.8	13.2
Career		151	150	32.5	.468	.374	.844	5.0	2.0	.7	1.0	12.5
