= Jaylin Stewart =

American basketball player (born 2005)

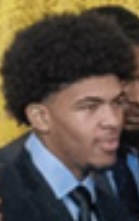
- Stewart in 2024

No. 3 – SMU Mustangs
- Position: Small forward
- Conference: Atlantic Coast Conference

Personal information
- Born: February 6, 2005 (age 21)
- Listed height: 6 ft 7 in (2.01 m)
- Listed weight: 225 lb (102 kg)

Career information
- High school: Garfield (Seattle, Washington)
- College: UConn (2023–2026); SMU (2026–present)

Career highlights
- NCAA champion (2024)

Jaylin Stewart (born February 6, 2005) is an American college basketball player for the SMU Mustangs of the Atlantic Coast Conference (ACC). He previously played for the UConn Huskies.

== Early life and high school ==
Stewart grew up in Seattle, Washington and attended Garfield High School. He averaged 19.2 points, 7.6 rebounds, 3.3 assists, and 2.1 blocks per game as a senior. Stewart was rated a four-star recruit and committed to play college basketball at UConn over offers from USC, Alabama, and Washington.

== College career ==
Stewart began his freshman season at UConn as third-string reserve at small forward, but entered the Huskies regular playing rotation as the season continued. He played in 37 games and averaged 2.5 points and 1.2 rebounds per game as UConn won the 2024 national championship.

Stewart missed more than a month during his sophomore season due to a knee injury. He averaged averaged 4.2 points and 2.6 rebounds per game. Following the 2025–26 season, Stewart announced he was entering the transfer portal. He ultimately transferred to SMU.

== Personal life ==
Stewart's father, Lodrick Stewart, played college basketball at USC and professionally in the NBA D-League and in Europe.

== Career statistics ==
Legend
GP	Games played	GS	Games started	MPG	Minutes per game
FG%	Field goal percentage	3P%	3-point field goal percentage	FT%	Free throw percentage
RPG	Rebounds per game	APG	Assists per game	SPG	Steals per game
BPG	Blocks per game	PPG	Points per game	**Bold**	Career high

=== College ===
Year	Team	GP	GS	MPG	FG%	3P%	FT%	RPG	APG	SPG	BPG	PPG
2023–24	UConn	**37**	0	8.9	.474	.270	.438	1.2	.3	.1	.2	2.5
2024–25	UConn	35	**12**	**17.8**	**.545**	**.364**	**.720**	2.4	.9	.1	**.3**	**5.4**
2025–26	UConn	32	**12**	16.3	.430	.345	.593	**2.6**	**1.1**	**.5**	**.3**	4.2
Career		104	24	14.2	.488	.335	.603	2.0	.8	.2	.3	4.0
