= Eric Reibe =

German basketball player (born 2006)

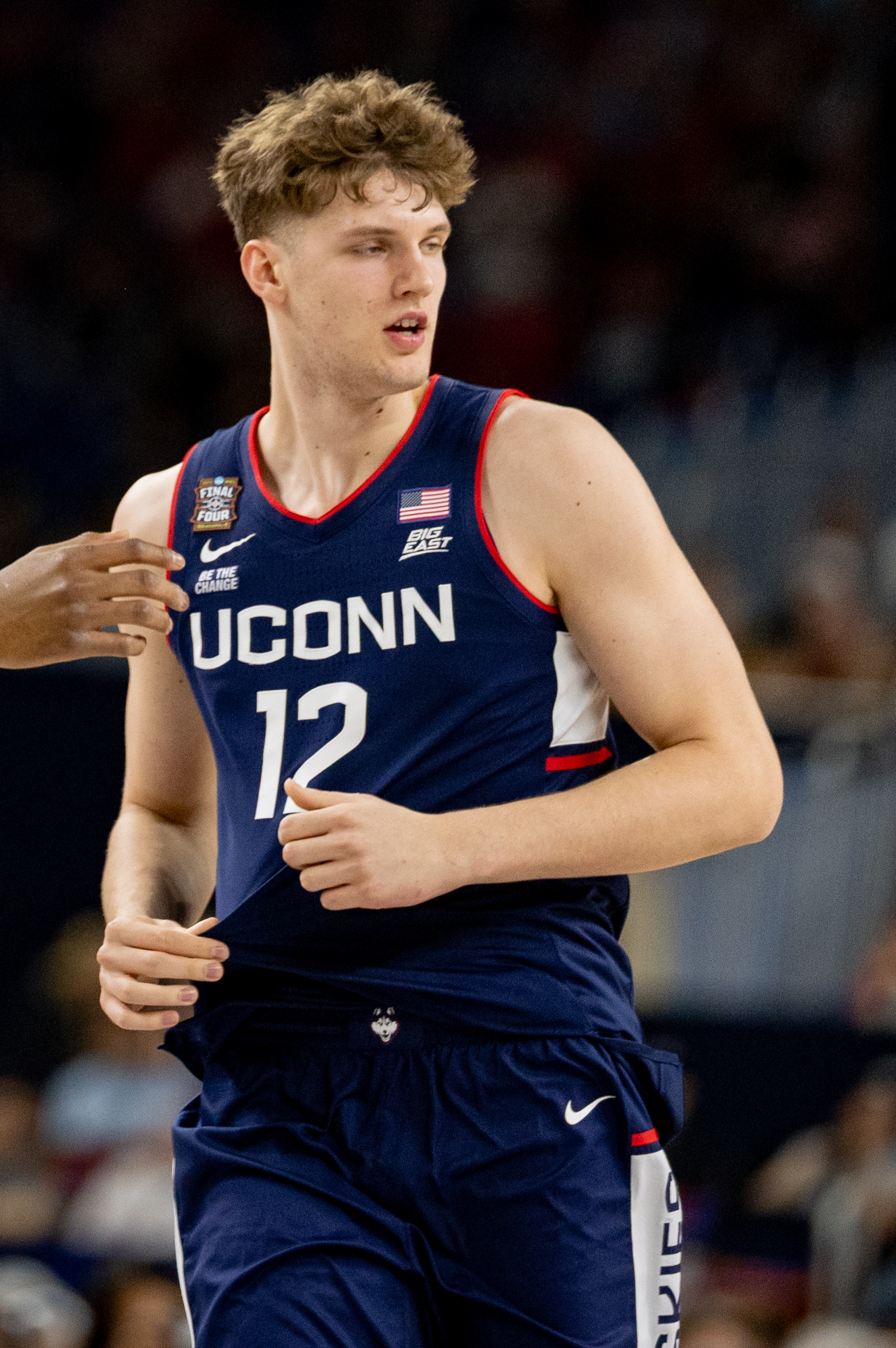

No. 12 – USC Trojans
- Position: Center
- Conference: Big Ten Conference

Personal information
- Born: June 29, 2006 (age 20)
- Listed height: 7 ft 1 in (2.16 m)
- Listed weight: 260 lb (118 kg)

Career information
- High school: The Bullis School (Potomac, Maryland)
- College: UConn (2025–2026); USC (2026–present)
- Playing career: 2022–2023

Career history
- 2022–2023: OrangeAcademy

Career highlights
- McDonald's All-American (2025)

Eric Reibe (born June 29, 2006) is a German college basketball player for the USC Trojans of the Big Ten Conference. He previously played for the UConn Huskies.

== Early career ==
Reibe grew up in Hanover, Germany. He played for OrangeAcademy, the ProA affiliate of Ratiopharm Ulm. Reibe averaged 8.0 points and 4.9 rebounds per game during the 2022–23 season. Reibe transferred to The Bullis School in Potomac, Maryland, United States. He was selected to play in the 2025 McDonald's All-American Boys Game during his senior year.

Reibe was rated a consensus top-30 overall prospect and one of the best centers in the 2025 recruiting class. He committed to play college basketball at UConn over offers from Kansas, Creighton, Indiana and Oregon.

== College career ==
Reibe enrolled at the University of Connecticut in July 2025 in order to take part in the Huskies' summer practices. Reibe made five starts as a freshman and averaged 5.9 points and 3.3 rebounds per game. Following the season he transferred to USC.

== National team career ==
Reibe was selected to the Germany men's national under-19 basketball team to play in the 2025 FIBA Under-19 Basketball World Cup. He averaged 15.4 points, 5.0 rebounds, and 1.6 assists per game as Germany won the silver medal.

== Career statistics ==
Legend
| GP | Games played | GS | Games started | MPG | Minutes per game |
| FG% | Field goal percentage | 3P% | 3-point field goal percentage | FT% | Free throw percentage |
| RPG | Rebounds per game | APG | Assists per game | SPG | Steals per game |
| BPG | Blocks per game | PPG | Points per game | **Bold** | Career high |

=== College ===
| Year | Team | GP | GS | MPG | FG% | 3P% | FT% | RPG | APG | SPG | BPG | PPG |
|---|---|---|---|---|---|---|---|---|---|---|---|---|
| 2025–26 | UConn | 40 | 5 | 13.8 | .658 | .308 | .521 | 3.3 | 0.5 | 0.3 | 0.7 | 5.9 |
