= Braylon Mullins =

American basketball player (born 2006)

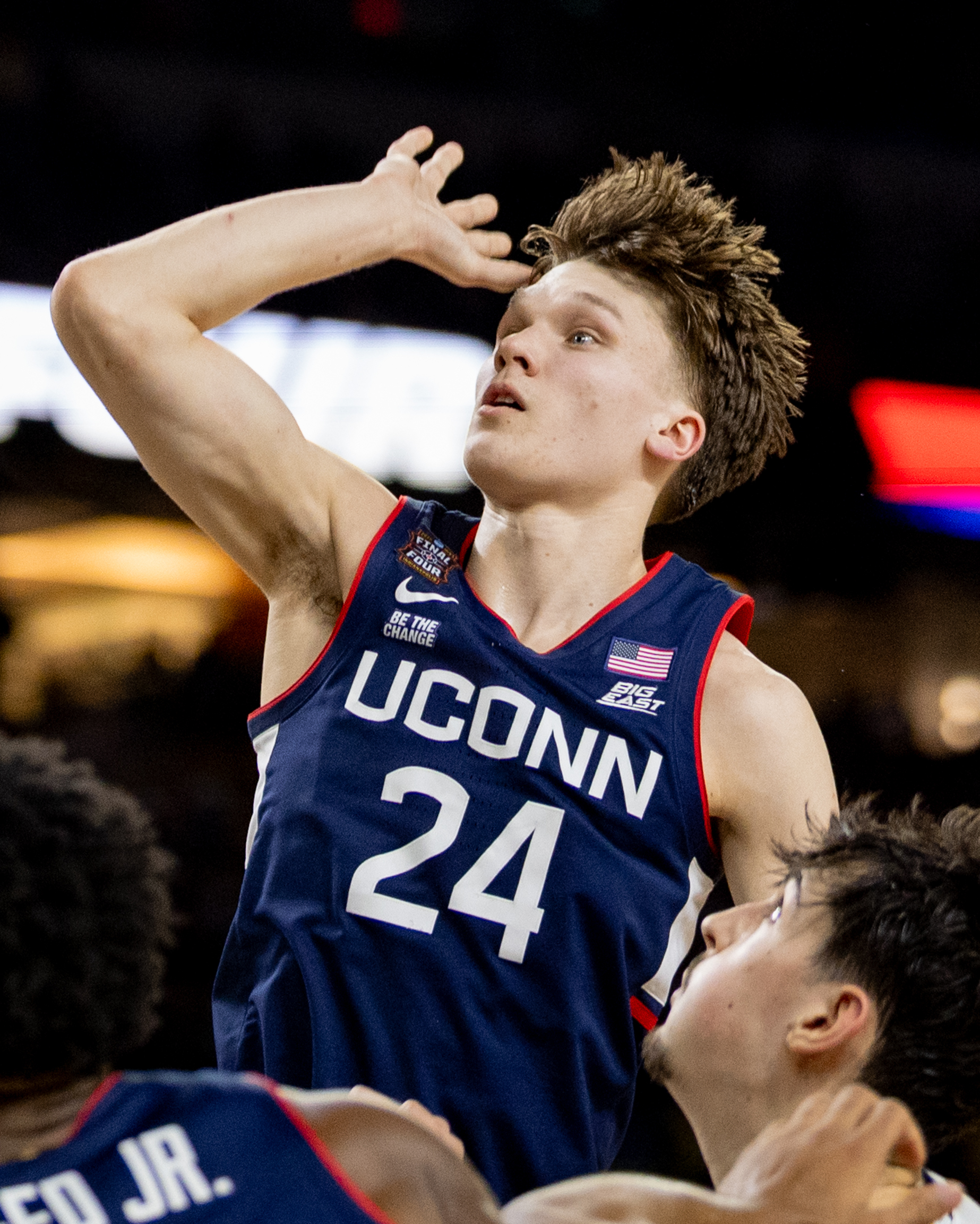
- Mullins in 2026

No. 24 – UConn Huskies
- Position: Shooting guard
- League: Big East Conference

Personal information
- Born: April 18, 2006 (age 20)
- Listed height: 6 ft 6 in (1.98 m)
- Listed weight: 198 lb (90 kg)

Career information
- High school: Greenfield-Central (Greenfield, Indiana)
- College: UConn (2025–present)

Career highlights
- Big East All-Freshman Team (2026); McDonald's All-American (2025); Indiana Mr. Basketball (2025)

Braylon Anthony Mullins (born April 18, 2006) is an American college basketball player for the UConn Huskies of the Big East Conference.

== Early life and high school ==
Mullins was named after Braylon Edwards in a family of Michigan Wolverines fans. He grew up in Greenfield, Indiana and attended Greenfield-Central High School. He averaged 16.9 points, 5.2 rebounds, and 2.6 steals per game during his sophomore season. After the season, Mullins participated in the Indiana All-Star Futures Game. He then averaged 25 points, 6.2 rebounds, and 3.2 steals per game. During the season, he recorded a career-high 51 points in a game against Pendleton Heights High School. After the season, Mullins joined the Indiana Elite, an Amateur Athletic Union team, competing on the Adidas 3SSB circuit. As a senior, Braylon led Greenfield-Central to a 23–4 record and averaged 32.9 points, 7.2 rebounds, 4.2 assists and 3.7 steals per game while shooting over 47 percent from 3-point range. He was named a 2025 McDonald's All American in January 2025. He was then recognized in April as Indiana's Mr. Basketball.

Mullins was ranked a consensus top-25 prospect in the 2025 recruiting class and a five-star recruit by 247Sports.com. He committed to play college basketball at UConn over offers from Indiana and North Carolina.

== College career ==
Mullins enrolled at the University of Connecticut in June 2025 in order to take part in the Huskies' summer practices.

During UConn's Elite Eight game versus Duke in the 2026 NCAA Division I men's basketball tournament, Mullins made a game-winning logo three with 0.4 seconds left after Silas Demary Jr. deflected a pass from Duke's Cayden Boozer during the game's final seconds. ESPN college basketball analyst Jeff Borzello called the shot "one of the greatest shots in the history of the NCAA tournament." Lesley Visser, of CBS Sports, called it "the greatest shot in NCAA Tournament history." Mullins opted to return for his sophomore year, bypassing the NBA draft.

== Personal life ==
Mullins is the son of Katie and Josh Mullins, and has twin younger brothers, Cole and Clay. Both parents have generations-deep roots in Greenfield—Katie's family has farmed in the area since the Reconstruction era, and Josh is a third-generation Greenfield native. His father played college basketball at Lincoln Trail College and Indiana University–Purdue University Indianapolis, the latter being the athletic predecessor to the current Indiana University Indianapolis (IU Indy) program. Josh played on the only IUPUI or IU Indy team to reach the NCAA Division I tournament in 2003.

== Career statistics ==
Legend
GP	Games played	GS	Games started	MPG	Minutes per game
FG%	Field goal percentage	3P%	3-point field goal percentage	FT%	Free throw percentage
RPG	Rebounds per game	APG	Assists per game	SPG	Steals per game
BPG	Blocks per game	PPG	Points per game	**Bold**	Career high

=== College ===
Year	Team	GP	GS	MPG	FG%	3P%	FT%	RPG	APG	SPG	BPG	PPG
2025–26	UConn	33	29	28.3	.421	.335	.889	3.5	1.4	1.0	.6	12.0
