= Kimani Young =

American men's basketball coach

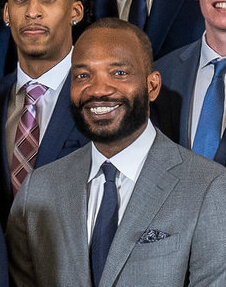
- Young in 2023

Current position
- Title: Associate head coach
- Team: UConn
- Conference: Big East Conference

Biographical details
- Born: Queens, New York, U.S.

Playing career
- 1993–1997: UTEP
- Position: Point guard

Coaching career (HC unless noted)
- 2012–2013: FIU (asst.)
- 2013–2018: Minnesota (asst.)
- 2018–2020: UConn (asst.)
- 2020–present: UConn (AHC)

Administrative career (AD unless noted)
- 2008–2009: St. John's (video coordinator)

Accomplishments and honors

Championships
- As an Assistant: 2x NCAA Division I Tournament (2023, 2024); 2x NCAA Division I Regional – Final Four (2023, 2024); Big East regular season (2024); Big East tournament (2024)

Kimani Young is an American college basketball coach who is the associate head coach for the UConn Huskies men's basketball team.

== Early life ==
Young was born in Queens, and played basketball at Forest Hills High School, earning a selection on the All-New York City team and a McDonald's All-American honorable mention as a senior. He played basketball for the University of Texas at El Paso under Don Haskins. Playing as a point guard, Young scored over 1,000 points with the team, averaging 16.6 points per game as a junior and 17.0 points per game as a senior.

== Coaching career ==
Young's coaching career began in 2006 as the athletic director at New Heights Youth, a non-profit organization which provides resources to underprivileged youth in the New York City area. In between two stints with the organization, he served as a team manager and video coordinator with the St. John's Red Storm men's basketball team during the 2008-09 season. During his tenure with New Heights Youth, he coached notable players such as Kemba Walker and JayVaughn Pinkston.

In 2012, Young was hired as an assistant coach at FIU by new head coach Richard Pitino. After one season at FIU, Young followed Pitino to Minnesota, where he served as an assistant coach under Pitino for five years. During his tenure, the Golden Gophers won the 2014 National Invitation Tournament and earned a berth to the 2017 NCAA tournament.

In 2018, Young was hired as an assistant head coach at UConn by Dan Hurley, as part of his new staff with the team. His performance with the team put him on The Athletic's list of 25 up-and-coming college basketball coaches. In 2020, he was promoted to the associate head coach of the team. While at UConn, he has worked to recruit and develop guards, such as All-Big East first-teamers Christian Vital, James Bouknight, and R. J. Cole. He played a key role in UConn's back-to-back national championships in 2023 and 2024, recruiting and developing key players Jordan Hawkins, Tristen Newton, and Stephon Castle.

== Personal life ==
Young has four children. His wife, Sharette Dixon, died at 39 of pneumonia.

In 1999, Young was arrested for having 96 pounds of marijuana, and he was sentenced to a year in federal prison.

Young is one of the founders of Coaches For Action, a group of 21 Big East assistant basketball coaches which uses the platform of athletics to educate and bring awareness to social injustices.
