= Luke Murray =

American basketball player and coach (born 1985)

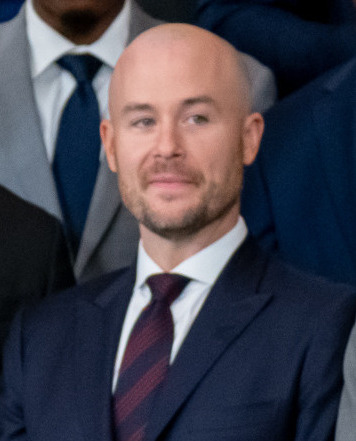
- Murray in 2023

Current position
- Title: Head coach
- Team: Boston College
- Conference: ACC
- Record: 5–0 (1.000)

Biographical details
- Education: Fairfield

Coaching career (HC unless noted)
- 2008–2009: Post (assistant)
- 2009–2010: Arizona (GA)
- 2010–2011: Wagner (assistant)
- 2011–2013: Towson (assistant)
- 2013–2015: Rhode Island (assistant)
- 2015–2018: Xavier (assistant)
- 2018–2021: Louisville (assistant)
- 2021–2026: UConn (assistant)
- 2026–present: Boston College

Administrative career (AD unless noted)
- 2007–2008: Quinnipiac (DBO)

Head coaching record
- Overall: 5–0 (1.000)

Accomplishments and honors

Championships
- As assistant: 2 NCAA Division I tournament (2023, 2024)

Luke Murray (born April 1, 1985) is an American college basketball coach who is currently the head coach at Boston College.

== Early life ==
Murray was born to actor Bill Murray and Margaret Kelly. He grew up in Palisades, New York. He attended St. Luke's School in New Canaan, Connecticut, where he played basketball and football. Murray attended Fairfield University and graduated in 2007. He began coaching Amateur Athletic Union (AAU) basketball during his freshman year at Fairfield. He later served as an assistant on an AAU team coached by former Boston Celtics head coach John Carroll during his final years in college.

== Coaching career ==
Murray began his college coaching career in 2007 as the director of basketball operations at Quinnipiac under coach Tom Moore. After one season he was hired as an assistant coach at Post University. Murray left Post to take a graduate assistant position at Arizona in 2009.

In 2010, Murray was hired as an assistant coach at Wagner by head coach Dan Hurley. He joined to the coaching staff at Towson in 2011 before reuniting as an assistant with Hurley at Rhode Island in 2013.

Murray was hired by head coach Chris Mack at Xavier in 2015 after two seasons at Rhode Island. He followed Mack when he was hired as the head coach at Louisville in 2018. There, Murray served as the primary recruiter for the Cardinals in addition to his assistant coaching duties. His contract was not renewed at the end of the 2020–21 season.

Murray was hired a third time by Dan Hurley, now the head coach at UConn, on May 3, 2021. He began coordinating the Huskies' offense prior to the start of the team's 2022–23 national championship season. He continued as offensive coordinator the following season as UConn repeated as national champion.

Murray signed a three-year contract extension on July 8, 2024 to stay with Hurley and UConn.

On March 26, 2026, Murray was hired as the head coach of the Boston College Eagles men's basketball, replacing Earl Grant. After the hiring, Murray continued to work as assistant coach of UConn during the 2026 Final Four in Indianapolis.

== Head coaching record ==
Record table
Season	Team	Overall	Conference	Standing	Postseason
Boston College (Atlantic Coast Conference) (2026–present)
2026–27	Boston College	5–0	0–0		
Boston College:		5–0 (1.000)	0–0 (–)		
Total:		5–0 (1.000)			
National champion Postseason invitational champion Conference regular season champion Conference regular season and conference tournament champion Division regular season champion Division regular season and conference tournament champion Conference tournament champion
