= Silas Demary Jr. =

American basketball player (born 2004)

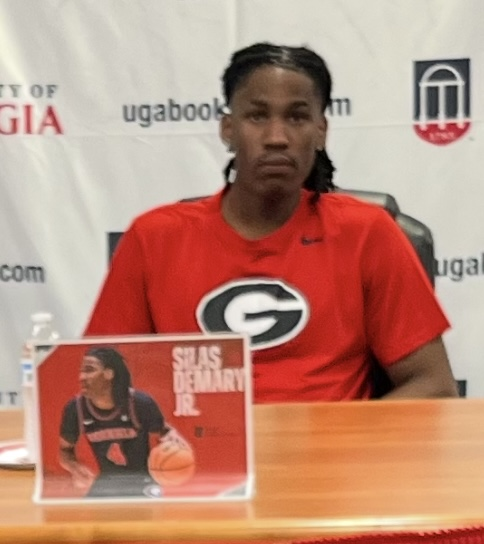
- Demary Jr. with Georgia in 2024

No. 5 – UConn Huskies
- Position: Point guard
- League: Big East Conference

Personal information
- Born: June 29, 2004 (age 22)
- Listed height: 6 ft 4 in (1.93 m)
- Listed weight: 195 lb (88 kg)

Career information
- High school: Millbrook (Raleigh, North Carolina); Liberty Heights (Charlotte, North Carolina); Combine Academy (Lincolnton, North Carolina)
- College: Georgia (2023–2025); UConn (2025–present)

Career highlights
- First-team All-Big East (2026); Big East All-Defensive team (2026); SEC All-Freshman Team (2024)

Silas Jackie Demary Jr. (born June 29, 2004) is an American college basketball player for the UConn Huskies of the Big East Conference. He previously played for the Georgia Bulldogs.

== Early life ==
Silas Demary Jr. was born on June 29, 2004. Growing up, Demary Jr.'s hometown was Raleigh, North Carolina, where he first attended Millbrook High School. At Milbrook, Demary Jr. played basketball during his freshman and sophomore years.

In his sophomore year, Demary Jr. averaged 4.9 points and 1.6 rebounds, though he did help lead Millbrook to a 23–4 record and an appearance in the North Carolina 4A championship tournament. Demary Jr. improved his production his junior year, averaging 17.3 points, 6.0 rebounds, and 4.0 assists, helping Millbrook go undefeated with a 19–0 record and winning the North Carolina 4A championship tournament.

Demary Jr. transferred to Liberty Heights Athletic Institute in Charlotte, North Carolina for his junior year. In his lone season at Liberty Heights, Demary Jr. averaged 14.0 points, 4.0 rebounds, and 4.0 assists, with Liberty Heights achieving a 22–8 record for the year.

Demary Jr. followed his head coach at Liberty Heights, Mike Wright, to Combine Academy in Lincolnton, North Carolina for his senior year. He averaged 13.9 points, 5.8 rebounds, and 5.7 assists while at Combine Academy, which went 35–5 and was ranked 25th in the ESPN SCNext poll in Demary Jr.'s senior season there.

=== Recruiting ===
In high school, Demary Jr. was rated as a four-star recruit. He was ranked No. 72 by 247 Sports. Demary Jr. originally chose to sign with USC under coach Andy Enfield. However, due to receiving less planned playing time than originally promised, Demary Jr. decommitted from USC. Instead, Demary Jr. signed with Georgia under coach Mike White over such teams as Wake Forest, Alabama, NC State, Tennessee, and Arizona State.

College recruiting
Name	Hometown	School	Height	Weight	Commit date
Silas Demary Jr. F	Raleigh, NC	Combine Academy	6 ft 5 in (1.96 m)	190 lb (86 kg)	Apr 24, 2023
Silas Demary Jr. F	Recruit ratings: Rivals: 247Sports: ESPN: (81)				
Overall recruit ranking: 247Sports: 72
Note: In many cases, Scout, Rivals, 247Sports, On3, and ESPN may conflict in their listings of height and weight.; In these cases, the average was taken. ESPN grades are on a 100-point scale.; Sources:

== College career ==
=== Georgia ===
==== Freshman season (2023–24) ====
Demary Jr. was named a starter before his first game as a freshman. In his college debut, Demary Jr. scored eight points with five rebounds and two assists in a loss against Oregon. On January 20, 2024, Demary Jr. scored a season-high 22 points in a loss against No. 8 Kentucky. Demary Jr. also had games with 19 points scored, doing so on February 10 in a loss against Arkansas and on April 2 in a loss against Seton Hall in the semifinals of the 2024 National Invitation Tournament. Overall, Demary Jr. averaged 9.7 points, 3.8 rebounds, and 2.5 assists his freshman year. He was named to the 2024 SEC All-Freshman team.

==== Sophomore season (2024–25) ====
As a sophomore, he averaged 13.5 points per game on 39.6% shooting, making him Georgia's second leading scorer. On March 1, 2025, he had a season high 26 points in an 83–67 victory against Texas, part of a four-game winning streak to close out Georgia's regular season. The Bulldogs lost to Oklahoma 81–75 in the first round of the SEC tournament, with Demary Jr. contributing 24 points. The team was a 9 seed in the 2025 NCAA tournament, losing in the first round to Gonzaga 89–68, with Demary Jr. scoring 15. He entered the transfer portal following the conclusion of the season.

=== UConn ===
==== Junior season (2025–26) ====
On April 3, 2025, Demary Jr. announced his decision to transfer to the University of Connecticut to play for the UConn Huskies.

On March 29, 2026 during the Elite Eight matchup against Duke, Demary deflected a pass from Cayden Boozer which ended up in the hands of Braylon Mullins, who buried the game-winning three with 0.4 seconds left, sending UConn to the Final Four.

== Personal life ==
Demary Jr. is the son of Shanté and Silas Demary Sr. Demary Sr. played football in the Arena Football League, winning Defensive Player of the Year in 2005.

== Career statistics ==
Legend
GP	Games played	GS	Games started	MPG	Minutes per game
FG%	Field goal percentage	3P%	3-point field goal percentage	FT%	Free throw percentage
RPG	Rebounds per game	APG	Assists per game	SPG	Steals per game
BPG	Blocks per game	PPG	Points per game	**Bold**	Career high

=== College ===
Year	Team	GP	GS	MPG	FG%	3P%	FT%	RPG	APG	SPG	BPG	PPG
2023–24	Georgia	37	36	27.8	.424	.303	.706	3.8	2.5	1.4	**.4**	9.7
2024–25	Georgia	33	33	**31.5**	.396	.374	**.804**	3.9	3.1	**1.7**	.2	**13.5**
2025–26	UConn	**39**	**38**	28.4	**.446**	**.385**	.801	**4.5**	**5.9**	1.6	.3	10.1
Career		109	107	29.1	.421	.362	.768	4.1	3.9	1.6	.3	11.0
