= 2025–26 Creighton Bluejays men's basketball team =

American college basketball season

2025–26 Creighton Bluejays men's basketball

College Basketball Crown, Semifinal
- Conference: Big East Conference
- Record: 16–18 (9–11 Big East)
- Head coach: Greg McDermott (16th season)
- Associate head coach: Alan Huss (1st season)
- Assistant coaches: Derek Kellogg (3rd season); Trey Zeigler (2nd season); Mike Nesbitt (1st season); Mitch Ballock (1st season)
- Home arena: CHI Health Center Omaha

2025–26 Big East men's basketball standings
	Conf.				Overall
Team	W		L	PCT	W		L	PCT
No. 10 St. John's †	18	–	2	.900	30	–	7	.811
No. 2 UConn	17	–	3	.850	34	–	6	.850
Villanova	15	–	5	.750	24	–	9	.727
Seton Hall	10	–	10	.500	21	–	12	.636
Creighton	9	–	11	.450	16	–	18	.471
DePaul	8	–	12	.400	16	–	16	.500
Marquette	7	–	13	.350	12	–	20	.375
Butler	7	–	13	.350	16	–	16	.500
Providence	7	–	13	.350	15	–	18	.455
Xavier	6	–	14	.300	15	–	18	.455
Georgetown	6	–	14	.300	16	–	18	.471
† 2026 Big East tournament winner Rankings from AP poll

The 2025–26 Creighton Bluejays men's basketball team represented Creighton University in the 2025–26 NCAA Division I men's basketball season. The Bluejays, led by 16th-year head coach Greg McDermott, played their home games at the CHI Health Center Omaha in Omaha, Nebraska as members of the Big East Conference. They finished the regular season 15–17, 9–11 in Big East play to finish in fifth place. They lost to Seton Hall in the quarterfinals of the Big East tournament. They accepted a bid to the College Basketball Crown tournament, where they defeated Rutgers in the quarterfinals before falling to West Virginia in the semifinals.

On March 23, 2026, the school announced that head coach Greg McDermott would retire as head coach following the season. The same day, the school announced that assistant coach Alan Huss will take over as head coach.

== Previous season ==
The Bluejays finished the 2024–25 season 25–11, 15–5 in Big East play to finish in second place. As the No. 2 seed in the Big East tournament, they defeated DePaul in the quarterfinals and UConn to advanced to the championship where they lost to St. John's. They received an at-large bid to the NCAA tournament as the No. 9 seed in the South Region, where they defeated Louisville before losing in the second round to Auburn.

== Offseason ==
=== Departures ===
Name	Number	Pos.	Height	Weight	Year	Hometown	Reason for departure
Steven Ashworth	1	G	6'1"	170	GS Senior	Alpine, UT	Graduated/undrafted in 2025 NBA draft; signed with the Indiana Pacers
Pop Isaacs	2	G	6'2"	170	Junior	Las Vegas, NV	Transferred to Texas A&M
Sterling Knox	4	G	6'4"	200	(redshirt) Freshman	Las Vegas, NV	Transferred to Independence CC
Jamiya Neal	5	G/F	6'6"	185	Senior	Toledo, OH	Graduated
Larry Johnson	6	G	6'4"	175	Freshman	Savannah, GA	Transferred to McNeese
Ryan Kalkbrenner	11	C	7'1"	270	GS Senior	St. Louis, MO	Graduated/2025 NBA draft; selected 34th overall by Charlotte Hornets
Mason Miller	13	F	6'9"	190	(redshirt) Junior	Germantown, TN	Transferred to Murray State
Sami Osmani	14	G	6'4"	205	GS Senior	Oak Lawn, IL	Walk-on; graduated
Frederick King	33	C	6'10"	250	Junior	Mangrove Cay, Bahamas	Transferred to Murray State

=== Incoming transfers ===
Name	Number	Pos.	Height	Weight	Year	Hometown	Previous School
Austin Swartz	1	G	6'4"	185	Sophomore	Concord, NC	Miami (FL)
Blake Harper	2	F	6'8"	210	Sophomore	Washington, D.C.	Howard
Josh Dix	4	G	6'5"	200	Senior	Council Bluffs, IA	Iowa
Nik Graves	5	G	6'3"	195	Senior	Durham, NC	Charlotte
Liam McChesney	13	F	6'10"	202	GS Senior	Prince Rupert, Canada	High Point
Owen Freeman	32	F	6'10"	230	Junior	Moline, IL	Iowa

=== 2025 recruiting class ===
College recruiting information
Name	Hometown	School	Height	Weight	Commit date
Hudson Greer #4 SF	Austin, TX	Montverde Academy	6 ft 6 in (1.98 m)	185 lb (84 kg)	Sep 13, 2024
Hudson Greer #4 SF	Recruit ratings: Rivals: 247Sports: ESPN: (86)				
Aleksa Dimitrijević; C	Serbia	N/A	7 ft 0 in (2.13 m)	215 lb (98 kg)	Apr 7, 2025
Aleksa Dimitrijević; C	Recruit ratings: Rivals: 247Sports: ESPN: (NR)				
Overall recruit ranking: Rivals: 80
Note: In many cases, Scout, Rivals, 247Sports, On3, and ESPN may conflict in their listings of height and weight.; In these cases, the average was taken. ESPN grades are on a 100-point scale.; Sources: "2025 Team Ranking". Rivals.

== Roster ==
2025–26 Creighton Bluejays men's basketball team
Players
Coaches

Pos.	#	Name	Height	Weight	Year	Previous school	Hometown
F	0	Jasen Green	6 ft 8 in (2.03 m)	235 lb (107 kg)	RS Jr	Millard North	Omaha, NE
G	1	Austin Swartz	6 ft 4 in (1.93 m)	205 lb (93 kg)	So	Cannon School; Miami (FL)	Concord, NC
G	2	Blake Harper	6 ft 7 in (2.01 m)	220 lb (100 kg)	So	Gonzaga College; Howard	Washington, D.C.
G	4	Josh Dix	6 ft 6 in (1.98 m)	205 lb (93 kg)	Sr	Abraham Lincoln; Iowa	Council Bluffs, IA
G	5	Nik Graves	6 ft 2 in (1.88 m)	190 lb (86 kg)	Sr	Greensboro Day School; Charlotte	Durham, NC
G	7	Fedor Žugić	6 ft 6 in (1.98 m)	215 lb (98 kg)	So	Gymnasium Slobodan Skerovic	Podgorica, Montenegro
G	9	Ty Davis	6 ft 4 in (1.93 m)	190 lb (86 kg)	So	Mountain Brook	Mountain Brook, AL
G	10	Hudson Greer	6 ft 7 in (2.01 m)	215 lb (98 kg)	Fr	Montverde Academy (FL)	Austin, TX
G	12	Shane Thomas	6 ft 3 in (1.91 m)	195 lb (88 kg)	RS So	Red Rocks Academy	Las Vegas, NV
F	13	Liam McChesney	6 ft 10 in (2.08 m)	195 lb (88 kg)	GS	Charles Hays Secondary School; High Point	Prince Rupert, Canada
F	17	Kerem Konan	6 ft 9 in (2.06 m)	235 lb (107 kg)	So	Doga College	Denizli, Turkey
F	23	Jackson McAndrew	6 ft 10 in (2.08 m)	225 lb (102 kg)	Jr	Wayzata	Wayzata, MN
C	27	Aleksa Dimitrijević	7 ft 0 in (2.13 m)	220 lb (100 kg)	Fr	Dositej	Belgrade, Serbia
F	32	Owen Freeman	6 ft 10 in (2.08 m)	240 lb (109 kg)	Jr	Moline; Iowa	Moline, IL
F	41	Isaac Traudt	6 ft 10 in (2.08 m)	235 lb (107 kg)	RS Jr	Grand Island Senior; Virginia	Grand Island, NE
F	53	Josh Townley-Thomas	6 ft 10 in (2.08 m)	225 lb (102 kg)	RS Jr	Creighton Prep; North Platte CC	Omaha, NE

Head coach

- Greg McDermott (Northern Iowa)

Assistant coach(es)

- Alan Huss (Creighton)
- Derek Kellogg (UMass)
- Trey Zeigler (TCU)
- Mike Nesbitt (New Mexico)
- Mitch Ballock (Creighton)

Legend

- (C) Team captain
- (S) Suspended
- (I) Ineligible
- (W) Walk-on
- Injured
- Current redshirt

Roster

== Schedule and results ==
Date time, TV	Rank^{#}	Opponent^{#}	Result	Record	High points	High rebounds	High assists	Site (attendance) city, state
Exhibition
October 17, 2025*; 7:30 p.m., Nebraska Public Media	No. 23	No. 16 Iowa State	W 71–58		13 – Graves	6 – Tied	5 – Graves	CHI Health Center Omaha (15,571); Omaha, NE
October 25, 2025*; 6:00 p.m., Jays Video	No. 23	Colorado State	W 76–64		15 – Graves	8 – McAndrew	3 – Harper	CHI Health Center Omaha (15,271); Omaha, NE
Regular season
November 5, 2025*; 7:00 p.m., Peacock	No. 23	South Dakota	W 92–76	1–0	19 – Freeman	7 – Tied	5 – Graves	CHI Health Center Omaha (16,404); Omaha, NE
November 11, 2025*; 9:00 p.m., ESPN	No. 23	at No. 19 Gonzaga	L 63–90	1–1	12 – Harper	6 – McAndrew	2 – Graves	McCarthey Athletic Center (6,000); Spokane, WA
November 14, 2025*; 7:00 p.m., Peacock	No. 23	Maryland Eastern Shore	W 84–45	2–1	14 – Tied	9 – Harper	5 – Freeman	CHI Health Center Omaha (16,603); Omaha, NE
November 19, 2025*; 7:00 p.m., ESPN+		North Dakota	W 75–60	3–1	19 – Harper	12 – Harper	4 – Greer	CHI Health Center Omaha (16,059); Omaha, NE
November 24, 2025*; 1:00 p.m., truTV		vs. Baylor; Players Era Festival Game 1	L 74–81	3–2	16 – Greer	5 – Green	6 – Dix	Michelob Ultra Arena; Paradise, NV
November 25, 2025*; 1:00 p.m., truTV		vs. No. 15 Iowa State; Players Era Festival Game 2	L 60–78	3–3	15 – Tied	9 – Freeman	6 – Dix	Michelob Ultra Arena; Paradise, NV
November 27, 2025*; 1:00 p.m., truTV		vs. Oregon; Players Era Festival Consolation Game	W 76–66	4–3	18 – Harper	9 – Harper	5 – Graves	Michelob Ultra Arena; Paradise, NV
December 2, 2025*; 8:00 p.m., truTV		Nicholls	W 96–76	5–3	14 – Tied	6 – Tied	7 – Graves	CHI Health Center Omaha (15,742); Omaha, NE
December 7, 2025*; 4:00 p.m., FS1		at Nebraska; Rivalry	L 50–71	5–4	16 – Swartz	6 – Green	3 – Green	Pinnacle Bank Arena (15,256); Lincoln, NE
December 13, 2025*; 2:00 p.m., FOX		Kansas State	L 76–83	5–5	18 – Tied	8 – Green	5 – Davis	CHI Health Center Omaha (16,657); Omaha, NE
December 17, 2025; 5:30 p.m., FS1		at Xavier	W 98–57	6–5 (1–0)	27 – Swartz	7 – Swartz	5 – Tied	Cintas Center (9,283); Cincinnati, OH
December 20, 2025; 7:30 p.m., Peacock/NBCSN		Marquette	W 84–63	7–5 (2–0)	17 – Graves	8 – Green	6 – Graves	CHI Health Center Omaha (16,507); Omaha, NE
December 22, 2025*; 7:00 p.m., ESPN+		Utah Tech	W 92–69	8–5	19 – Swartz	6 – Dix	5 – Dix	CHI Health Center Omaha (16,267); Omaha, NE
December 30, 2025; 8:00 p.m., FS1		Butler	W 89–85	9–5 (3–0)	23 – Green	7 – Dix	5 – Tied	CHI Health Center Omaha (16,761); Omaha, NE
January 4, 2026; 11:00 a.m., Peacock/NBCSN		at Seton Hall	L 54–56	9–6 (3–1)	16 – Swartz	10 – Dix	6 – Dix	Prudential Center (8,532); Newark, NJ
January 7, 2026; 6:30 p.m., Peacock/NBCSN		at Villanova	W 76–72	10–6 (4–1)	20 – Swartz	7 – Green	3 – Swartz	Finneran Pavilion (6,501); Villanova, PA
January 10, 2026; 1:00 p.m., FS1		St. John's	L 73–90	10–7 (4–2)	14 – Traudt	4 – Tied	3 – Dix	CHI Health Center Omaha (17,185); Omaha, NE
January 13, 2026; 8:00 p.m., Peacock/NBCSN		Georgetown	W 86–83 ^{OT}	11–7 (5–2)	33 – Swartz	4 – Tied	5 – Graves	CHI Health Center Omaha (16,554); Omaha, NE
January 16, 2026; 5:30 p.m., FS1		at Providence	L 88–93	11–8 (5–3)	26 – Green	8 – Harper	4 – Tied	Amica Mutual Pavilion (11,655); Providence, RI
January 21, 2026; 6:00 p.m., FS1		Xavier	W 94–93	12–8 (6–3)	19 – Dix	4 – Tied	9 – Graves	CHI Health Center Omaha (16,485); Omaha, NE
January 27, 2026; 8:30 p.m., TNT		at Marquette	L 62–86	12–9 (6–4)	17 – Swartz	6 – Green	6 – Swartz	Fiserv Forum (14,115); Milwaukee, WI
January 31, 2026; 7:00 p.m., FOX		No. 2 UConn; Pink Out	L 58–85	12–10 (6–5)	17 – Graves	5 – Harper	2 – Tied	CHI Health Center Omaha (18,650); Omaha, NE
February 4, 2026; 6:30 p.m., Peacock/NBCSN		at Georgetown	L 68–76	12–11 (6–6)	12 – Green	8 – Green	5 – Graves	Capital One Arena (4,380); Washington, DC
February 7, 2026; 5:00 p.m., Peacock		Seton Hall	W 69–68	13–11 (7–6)	18 – Traudt	7 – Green	5 – Graves	CHI Health Center Omaha (16,714); Omaha, NE
February 11, 2026; 8:00 p.m., Peacock/NBCSN		at DePaul	L 71–72	13–12 (7–7)	15 – Swartz	5 – Dix	8 – Graves	Wintrust Arena (3,763); Chicago, IL
February 14, 2026; 1:30 p.m., FOX		Villanova	L 69–80	13–13 (7–8)	15 – Graves	11 – Green	5 – Graves	CHI Health Center Omaha (16,479); Omaha, NE
February 18, 2026; 6:00 p.m., TNT		at No. 5 UConn	W 91–84	14–13 (8–8)	21 – Dix	11 – Green	Graves – 5	Gampel Pavilion (10,244); Storrs, CT
February 21, 2026; 11:00 a.m., FOX		at No. 17 St. John's	L 52–81	14–14 (8–9)	9 – Žugić	7 – Green	5 – Graves	Madison Square Garden (19,328); New York, NY
February 25, 2026; 8:00 p.m., Peacock/NBCSN		DePaul	L 71–72	14–15 (8–10)	15 – Dix	9 – Green	4 – Tied	CHI Health Center Omaha (15,994); Omaha, NE
February 28, 2026; 4:30 p.m., TNT		Providence	L 76–79	14–16 (8–11)	18 – Tied	7 – Tied	8 – Green	CHI Health Center Omaha (17,115); Omaha, NE
March 4, 2026; 5:00 p.m., FS1		at Butler	W 76–59	15–16 (9–11)	22 – Dix	9 – Green	13 – Graves	Hinkle Fieldhouse (6,895); Indianapolis, IN
Big East tournament
March 12, 2026; 1:30 p.m., Peacock/NBCSN	(5)	vs. (4) Seton Hall; Quarterfinal	L 61–72	15–17	22 – Dix	11 – Green	5 – Graves	Madison Square Garden (19,812); New York, NY
College Basketball Crown
April 2, 2026*; 9:30 p.m., FS1		vs. Rutgers; Quarterfinal	W 82–69	16–17	28 – Graves	9 – Green	8 – Graves	MGM Grand Garden Arena; Paradise, NV
April 4, 2026*; 3:00 p.m., FOX		vs. West Virginia; Semifinal	L 70–87	16–18	18 – Dix	12 – Green	3 – Graves	T-Mobile Arena; Paradise, NV
*Non-conference game. ^{#}Rankings from AP Poll. (#) Tournament seedings in parentheses. All times are in Central Time.

== Rankings ==
Ranking movements Legend: ██ Increase in ranking ██ Decrease in ranking — = Not ranked RV = Received votes
	Week																				
Poll	Pre	1	2	3	4	5	6	7	8	9	10	11	12	13	14	15	16	17	18	19	Final
AP	23	23	RV	RV	—	—	—	—	—*	—	—	—	—	—	—	—	—	—	—	—	—
Coaches	23	23	RV	RV	—	—	—	—	—	—	—	—	—	—	—	—	—	—	—	—	—

*AP did not release a week 8 poll.
