= 2025–26 Big East Conference men's basketball season =

- League: NCAA Division I
- Sport: Basketball
- Teams: 11
- TV partner(s): Fox, FS1, TNT, TruTV, NBC, ESPN+

Regular Season
- Season champions: St. John's
- Runners-up: UConn
- Season MVP: Zuby Ejiofor, St. John's

Tournament
- Venue: Madison Square Garden, New York City, New York
- Champions: St. John's
- Runners-up: UConn
- Finals MVP: Zuby Ejiofor

Basketball seasons
- ← 2024–25 2026–27 →

2025–26 Big East men's basketball standings
	Conf.				Overall
Team	W		L	PCT	W		L	PCT
No. 10 St. John's †	18	–	2	.900	30	–	7	.811
No. 2 UConn	17	–	3	.850	34	–	6	.850
Villanova	15	–	5	.750	24	–	9	.727
Seton Hall	10	–	10	.500	21	–	12	.636
Creighton	9	–	11	.450	16	–	18	.471
DePaul	8	–	12	.400	16	–	16	.500
Marquette	7	–	13	.350	12	–	20	.375
Butler	7	–	13	.350	16	–	16	.500
Providence	7	–	13	.350	15	–	18	.455
Xavier	6	–	14	.300	15	–	18	.455
Georgetown	6	–	14	.300	16	–	18	.471
† 2026 Big East tournament winner Rankings from AP poll

The 2025–26 Big East men's basketball season is the current season for Big East Conference basketball teams that began with practices and exhibition games in October 2025, followed by the start of the 2025–26 NCAA Division I men's basketball season which began in November 2025. Conference play began in December 2025 and ended in March 2026.

== Head coaches ==
=== Coaching changes ===
==== Villanova ====
After three seasons, on March 15, 2025, the Wildcats announced they had fired head coach Kyle Neptune, naming assistant coach Mike Nardi as the interim coach for the team's College Basketball Crown run. On March 30, the school named Maryland head coach Kevin Willard the team's new head coach.

==== Xavier ====
Following the season, on March 24, 2025, head coach Sean Miller left the Musketeers for a second time to take the head coaching position at Texas. Two days later, the school named New Mexico head coach Richard Pitino the team's new head coach.

=== Coaches ===
Team	Head coach	Previous job	Years at school	Overall record	Big East record	Big East titles	NCAA Tournaments	NCAA Final Fours	NCAA Championships
Butler	Thad Matta	Ohio State	5	47–53 (.470)	21–39 (.350)	0	0	0	0
UConn	Dan Hurley	Rhode Island	8	130–40 (.765)	69–27 (.719)	1	5	2	2
Creighton	Greg McDermott	Iowa State	16	270–141 (.657)	137–87 (.612)	0	10	0	0
DePaul	Chris Holtmann	Ohio State	2	14–20 (.412)	4–16 (.200)	0	0	0	0
Georgetown	Ed Cooley	Providence	3	27–39 (.409)	10–30 (.250)	0	0	0	0
Marquette	Shaka Smart	Texas	5	98–41 (.705)	55–24 (.696)	1	4	0	0
Providence	Kim English	George Mason	3	33–34 (.493)	16–24 (.400)	0	0	0	0
Seton Hall	Shaheen Holloway	St. Peter's	4	49–53 (.480)	25–35 (.417)	0	0	0	0
St. John's	Rick Pitino	Iona	3	51–18 (.739)	29–11 (.725)	1	1	0	0
Villanova	Kevin Willard	Maryland	1	0–0 (–)	0–0 (–)	0	0	0	0
Xavier	Richard Pitino	New Mexico	1	0–0 (–)	0–0 (–)	0	0	0	0

Notes:

- All records, appearances, titles, etc. are from time with current school only.
- Year at school includes 2025–26 season.
- Overall and Big East records are from time at current school only and are through the beginning of the season.
- McDermott's MVC conference records, Matta's MCC records, Hurley's AAC records not included since team began play in the Big East.

== Preseason ==
=== Preseason Big East poll ===
Prior to the conference's annual media day, conference standings were projected by panel of writers.

Rank	Team	Points
1.	St. John's	97 (7)
2.	UConn	94 (4)
3.	Creighton	80
4.	Providence	64
5.	Marquette	60
6.	Georgetown	57
7.	Villanova	50
8.	Xavier	33
9.	DePaul	29
10.	Butler	26
11.	Seton Hall	15
(first place votes)

=== Preseason All-Big East ===
A select media panel named a preseason All-Big East team and player of the year.

Honor	Recipient
Preseason Player of the Year	Zuby Ejiofor, St. John's
Preseason Freshman of the Year	Braylon Mullins, UConn
Preseason All-Big East First Team	Solo Ball, UConn
Preseason All-Big East First Team	Alex Karaban, UConn
Preseason All-Big East First Team	Tarris Reed Jr., UConn
Preseason All-Big East First Team	Owen Freeman, Creighton
Preseason All-Big East First Team	Chase Ross, Marquette
Preseason All-Big East First Team	Bryce Hopkins, St. John's
Preseason All-Big East Second Team	Silas Demary Jr., UConn
Preseason All-Big East Second Team	Josh Dix, Creighton
Preseason All-Big East Second Team	KJ Lewis, Georgetown
Preseason All-Big East Second Team	Jason Edwards, Providence
Preseason All-Big East Second Team	Ian Jackson, St. John's
Preseason All-Big East Third Team	Nik Graves, Creighton
Preseason All-Big East Third Team	Jackson McAndrew, Creighton
Preseason All-Big East Third Team	CJ Gunn, DePaul
Preseason All-Big East Third Team	Malik Mack, Georgetown
Preseason All-Big East Third Team	Oswin Erhunmwunse, Providence
Preseason All-Big East Third Team	Dillon Mitchell, St. John's
Preseason All-Big East Third Team	Joson Sanon, St. John's

=== Preseason All-American teams ===
Player	AP	CBS	USA Today	Sports Illustrated	SB Nation	Sporting News
Zuby Ejiofor, St. John's	RV	3rd team	2nd team	3rd team		3rd team
Solo Ball, UConn	RV				3rd team	
Alex Karaban, UConn	RV					3rd team

== Regular season ==
=== Rankings ===
Legend
	Improvement in ranking
	Drop in ranking
	Not ranked previous week
RV	Received votes but were not ranked in Top 25 of poll
(Italics)	Number of first place votes

		Pre/ Wk 1	Wk 2	Wk 3	Wk 4	Wk 5	Wk 6	Wk 7	Wk 8	Wk 9	Wk 10	Wk 11	Wk 12	Wk 13	Wk 14	Wk 15	Wk 16	Wk 17	Wk 18	Wk 19	Wk 20	Final
Butler	AP									*												
Butler	C				RV	RV																
UConn	AP	4 (2)	3 (3)	3 (2)	5	5	5	5	4	4*	4	3	2	2	3	6	5	6	4	6	7	2
UConn	C	4	3	3	7	5	5	5	4	4	4	4	3	3	3	5	5	6	4	6	7	2
Creighton	AP	23	23	RV	RV					*												
Creighton	C	23	23	RV	RV																	
DePaul	AP									*												
DePaul	C																					
Georgetown	AP		RV	RV	RV					*												
Georgetown	C		RV	RV	RV																	
Marquette	AP									*												
Marquette	C																					
Providence	AP									*												
Providence	C																					
Seton Hall	AP					RV	RV	RV	RV	RV*	RV	25										
Seton Hall	C						RV	RV	RV	RV	RV	RV	RV									
St. John's	AP	5	13	14	14	23	22	22	RV	RV*		RV	RV	25	22	17	17	15	18	13	10	10
St. John's	C	6	11	16	15	22	21	20	RV	25	RV	RV	25	24	22	17	16	15	17	13	9	10
Villanova	AP						RV	RV		*	RV	RV	RV	RV	RV	RV	RV	RV	RV	RV		
Villanova	C	RV								RV	24	RV	RV	RV	RV	RV	RV	RV	RV	RV	RV	RV
Xavier	AP									*												
Xavier	C																					

*AP did not release a week 9 poll.

=== Early Season Tournaments ===
Eight out of the 11 Big East teams participated in traditional early-season bracketed tournaments. The three schools that didn't were UConn, Marquette and Villanova, with the former vowing to never participate in one ever again following the Huskies' disappointing 8th-place finish in the 2024 Maui Invitational.

Team	Tournament	Finish
Butler	Greenbrier Tip-Off	1st
Creighton	Players Era Festival	Won consolation game
DePaul	Emerald Coast Classic	2nd
Georgetown	ESPN Events Invitational	4th
Providence	Rady Children's Invitational	4th
Seton Hall	Maui Invitational	3rd
St. John's	Players Era Festival	Lost consolation game
Xavier	Charleston Classic	3rd

=== Big East Players of the Week ===
Throughout the conference regular season, the Big East offices named one or two players of the week and one or two freshmen of the week each Monday.

Week	Date	Player of the week	School	Freshman of the week	School
1	November 10, 2025	Zuby Ejiofor	St. John's	Stefan Vaaks	Providence
2	November 17, 2025	Alex Karaban	UConn	Acaden Lewis	Villanova
3	November 24, 2025	Michael Ajayi	Butler	Eric Reibe	UConn
4	December 1, 2025	AJ Staton-McCray	Seton Hall	Acaden Lewis (2)	Villanova
5	December 8, 2025	Tre Carroll	Xavier	Braylon Mullins	UConn
6	December 15, 2025	Michael Ajayi (2)	Butler	Acaden Lewis (3)	Villanova
7	December 22, 2025	Stephon Payne	Seton Hall	Matt Hodge	Villanova
8	December 29, 2025	Josh Dix	Creighton	Acaden Lewis (4)	Villanova
9	January 5, 2026	Zuby Ejiofor (2)	St. John's	Jamier Jones	Providence
10	January 12, 2026	Silas Demary Jr.	UConn	Braylon Mullins (2)	UConn
11	January 19, 2026	CJ Gunn	DePaul	Stefan Vaaks (2)	Providence
12	January 26, 2026	Finley Bizjack	Butler	Nigel James Jr.	Marquette
13	February 2, 2026	Budd Clark	Seton Hall	Nigel James Jr. (2)	Marquette
14	February 9, 2026	Jaylin Sellers	Providence	Acaden Lewis (5)	Villanova
15	February 16, 2026	Solo Ball	UConn	Nigel James Jr. (3)	Marquette
16	February 23, 2026	Bryce Hopkins	St. John's	Braylon Mullins (3)	UConn
17	March 2, 2026	Jaylin Sellers (2)	Providence	Nigel James Jr. (4)	Marquette
18	March 8, 2026	Zuby Ejiofor (3)	St. John's	Nigel James Jr. (5)	Marquette

=== Conference matrix ===
This table summarizes the head-to-head results between teams in conference play. Each team is scheduled to play 20 conference games, playing one game at home and one game on the road against each opponent.

	Butler	UConn	Creighton	DePaul	Georgetown	Marquette	Providence	Seton Hall	St. John's	Villanova	Xavier
vs. Butler	–	2–0	2–0	0–2	1–1	1–1	1–1	1–1	2–0	2–0	1–1
vs. UConn	0–2	–	1–1	0–2	0–2	1–1	0–2	0–2	1–1	0–2	0–2
vs. Creighton	0–2	1–1	–	2–0	1–1	1–1	2–0	1–1	2–0	1–1	0–2
vs. DePaul	2–0	2–0	0–2	–	1–1	0–2	2–0	0–2	2–0	2–0	1–1
vs. Georgetown	1–1	2–0	1–1	1–1	–	1–1	0–2	2–0	2–0	2–0	2–0
vs. Marquette	1–1	1–1	1–1	2–0	1–1	–	0–2	2–0	2–0	2–0	1–1
vs. Providence	1–1	2–0	0–2	0–2	2–0	2–0	–	2–0	1–1	2–0	1–1
vs. Seton Hall	1–1	2–0	1–1	2–0	0–2	0–2	0–2	–	2–0	2–0	0–2
vs. St. John's	0–2	1–1	0–2	0–2	0–2	0–2	1–1	0–2	–	0–2	0–2
vs. Villanova	0–2	2–0	1–1	0–2	0–2	0–2	0–2	0–2	2–0	–	0–2
vs. Xavier	1–1	2–0	2–0	1–1	0–2	1–1	1–1	2–0	2–0	2–0	–
Total	7–13	17–3	9–11	8–12	6–14	7–13	7–13	10–10	18–2	15–5	6–14

== Honors and awards ==
=== Individual awards ===
2026 Big East Men's Basketball Individual Awards
Award	Recipient(s)
Player of the Year	Zuby Ejiofor, St. John's
Coach of the Year	Shaheen Holloway, Seton Hall
Defensive Player of the Year	Zuby Ejiofor, St. John’s
Freshman of the Year	Nigel James Jr., Marquette
Most Improved Player of the Year	Tyler Perkins, Villanova
Sixth Man Award	Devin Askew, Villanova
Sportsmanship Award	Josh Dix, Creighton

=== All-Big East teams ===
2026 Big East Men's Basketball All-Conference Teams
First Team	Second Team	Third Team	Freshman Team	Defensive Team
Michael Ajayi, Butler; Silas Demary Jr., UConn; Alex Karaban, UConn; Tarris Reed, UConn †Zuby Ejiofor, St. John’s; Tre Carroll, Xavier	Solo Ball, UConn; Jaylin Sellers, Providence; Bryce Hopkins, St. John's; Budd Clark, Seton Hall; Acaden Lewis, Villanova	Finley Bizjack, Butler; KJ Lewis, Georgetown; Nigel James Jr., Marquette; Dillon Mitchell, St. John's; Duke Brennan, Villanova; Tyler Perkins, Villanova	†Braylon Mullins, UConn †Nigel James Jr., Marquette; Jamier Jones, Providence †Stefan Vaaks, Providence †Acaden Lewis, Villanova	†Zuby Ejiofor, St. John’s; Budd Clark, Seton Hall; Dillon Mitchell, St. John's; Silas Demary Jr., UConn; Chase Ross, Marquette
† - denotes unanimous selection

== Postseason ==
=== Big East Tournament ===
First round Wednesday, March 11; Peacock/NBCSN
8	Butler	81
9	Providence	91
7	Marquette	87
10	Xavier	89
6	DePaul	56
11	Georgetown	63

Quarterfinals; Thursday, March 12; Peacock/NBCSN/FS1
1	13 St. John's	85
9	Providence	72
4	Seton Hall	72
5	Creighton	61
2	6 UConn	93
10	Xavier	68
3	Villanova	64
11	Georgetown	78

Semifinals; Friday, March 13; FOX/FS1
1	13 St. John's	78
4	Seton Hall	68
2	6 UConn	67
11	Georgetown	51

Championship; Saturday, March 14; FOX
1	13 St. John's	72
2	6 UConn	52

=== NCAA tournament ===
Seed	Region	School	First round	Second round	Sweet 16	Elite Eight	Final Four	Championship
2	East	UConn	W 82–71 vs. (15) Furman	W 73–57 vs. (7) UCLA	W 67–63 vs. (3) Michigan State	W 73–72 vs. (1) Duke	W 71–62 vs. (S3) Illinois	L 63–69 vs. (MW1) Michigan
5	East	St. John's	W 79–53 vs. (12) Northern Iowa	W 67–65 vs. (4) Kansas	L 75–80 vs. (1) Duke	DNP		
8	West	Villanova	L 76–86 vs. (9) Utah State	DNP				
		W–L (%):	2–1 (.667)	2–0 (1.000)	1–1 (.500)	1–0 (1.000)	1–0 (1.000)	0–1 (.000)
Total: 7–3 (.700)

=== CBC ===
School	Quarterfinals	Semifinals	Final
Creighton	W 82–69 vs. Rutgers	L 70–87 vs. West Virginia	DNP
W–L (%):	1–0 (1.000)	0–1 (.000)	0–0 (–)
Total: 1–1 (.500)

=== NIT ===
No Big East teams participated in 2026.

== NBA draft ==
PG	Point guard	SG	Shooting guard	SF	Small forward	PF	Power forward	C	Center

Player	Team	Round	Pick #	Position	School
(United States) Zuby Ejiofor	Atlanta Hawks	1	23	PF	St. John's
(United States) Tarris Reed Jr.	Denver Nuggets	1	26	C	UConn
(United States) Alex Karaban	Cleveland Cavaliers	1	29	SF/PF	UConn
(United States) Dillon Mitchell	Boston Celtics	2	40	SF	St. John's
(United States) Bryce Hopkins	Denver Nuggets	2	49	SF	St. John's
