= 2025–26 Villanova Wildcats men's basketball team =

American college basketball season

2025–26 Villanova Wildcats men's basketball

Big 5 Classic champions

NCAA tournament, First round
- Conference: Big East Conference
- Record: 24–9 (15–5 Big East)
- Head coach: Kevin Willard (1st season)
- Assistant coaches: David Cox; Kevin Norris; Ashley Howard; Greg Manning Jr.; Ricky Harris
- Home arena: Finneran Pavilion; Xfinity Mobile Arena

2025–26 Big East men's basketball standings
	Conf.				Overall
Team	W		L	PCT	W		L	PCT
No. 10 St. John's †	18	–	2	.900	30	–	7	.811
No. 2 UConn	17	–	3	.850	34	–	6	.850
Villanova	15	–	5	.750	24	–	9	.727
Seton Hall	10	–	10	.500	21	–	12	.636
Creighton	9	–	11	.450	16	–	18	.471
DePaul	8	–	12	.400	16	–	16	.500
Marquette	7	–	13	.350	12	–	20	.375
Butler	7	–	13	.350	16	–	16	.500
Providence	7	–	13	.350	15	–	18	.455
Xavier	6	–	14	.300	15	–	18	.455
Georgetown	6	–	14	.300	16	–	18	.471
† 2026 Big East tournament winner Rankings from AP poll

The 2025–26 Villanova Wildcats men's basketball team represented Villanova University in the 2025–26 NCAA Division I men's basketball season. The Wildcats, led by coach first year head coach Kevin Willard, played their home games at the Finneran Pavilion on the school's campus in the Philadelphia suburb of Villanova, Pennsylvania and Xfinity Mobile Arena as members of the Big East Conference.

== Previous season ==
The Wildcats finished the 2024–25 season 21–15, 11–9 in Big East play to finish in sixth place. They defeated Seton Hall in the first round of the Big East tournament before losing to UConn in the quarterfinals. They accepted a bid to the inaugural College Basketball Crown tournament where they defeated Colorado in the first round and USC in the quarterfinals before losing in the semifinals to UCF.

On March 15, 2025, the school fired head coach Kyle Neptune. Assistant coach Mike Nardi was named interim coach for the postseason tournament. On March 30, the school named Maryland head coach Kevin Willard the team's new head coach.

== Offseason ==
=== Departures ===
Name	Number	Pos.	Height	Weight	Year	Hometown	Reason for departure
Josiah Moseley	0	F	6'6"	185	Freshman	Round Rock, TX	Transferred to Texas Tech
Kris Parker	1	G	6'9"	195	(redshirt) Freshman	Tallahassee, FL	Transferred to UCF
Jhamir Brickus	2	G	5'11"	205	GS Senior	Coatesville, PA	Graduated
Wooga Poplar	5	G	6'5"	197	Senior	Philadelphia, PA	Graduated
Aleksandar Gavalyugov	7	G	6'2"	195	Freshman	Sofia, Bulgaria	Transferred to Santa Clara
Jordann Dumont	10	F	6'8"	200	(redshirt) Freshman	Montreal, QC	Transferred to VCU
Collin O'Toole	12	G	6'1"	180	Senior	Rye, NY	Walk-on; graduated
Enoch Boakye	13	C	6'11"	250	Senior	Brampton, ON	Transferred
Jordan Longino	15	G	6'5"	215	Senior	Doylestown, PA	Transferred
Malcolm Thomas	20	F	6'8"	195	Freshman	Mitchelville, MD	Transferred to Dayton
Nnanna Njoku	21	F	6'9"	260	(redshirt) Junior	Newark, DE	Transferred to Delaware
Eric Dixon	43	F	6'8"	255	GS Senior	Willow Grove, PA	Graduated/undrafted in 2025 NBA draft; signed with the Los Angeles Lakers

=== Incoming transfers ===
Name	Num	Pos.	Height	Weight	Year	Hometown	Previous school
Zion Stanford	1	G	6'6"	205	Junior	Philadelphia, PA	Temple
Bryce Lindsay	2	G	6'3"	195	(redshirt) Sophomore	Baltimore, MD	James Madison
Devin Askew	5	G	6'5"	195	GS Senior	Sacramento, CA	Long Beach State
Tafara Gapare	6	F	6'9"	215	Senior	Wellington, New Zealand	Maryland
Malachi Palmer	7	G	6'6"	212	Sophomore	Harrisburg, PA	Maryland
Malcolm Flaggs	15	G	6'6"	200	(redshirt) Junior	Tuba City, AZ	Grand Canyon
Braden Pierce	17	C	7'0"	245	(redshirt) Sophomore	Woodstock, GA	Maryland
Duke Brennan	24	F	6'10"	250	Senior	Chandler, AZ	Grand Canyon

=== 2025 recruiting class ===
College recruiting
Name	Hometown	School	Height	Weight	Commit date
Acaden Lewis #7 PG	Washington, DC	Sidwell Friends School	6 ft 2 in (1.88 m)	180 lb (82 kg)	May 1, 2025
Acaden Lewis #7 PG	Recruit ratings: Rivals: 247Sports: ESPN: (88)				
Chris Jeffrey #33 PG	Brooklyn, NY	Mt. Zion Prep	6 ft 3 in (1.91 m)	185 lb (84 kg)	Apr 9, 2025
Chris Jeffrey #33 PG	Recruit ratings: Rivals: 247Sports: ESPN: (81)				
Nico Onyekwere #60 C	Glen Head, NY	Long Island Lutheran High School	7 ft 1 in (2.16 m)	240 lb (110 kg)	Apr 29, 2025
Nico Onyekwere #60 C	Recruit ratings: Rivals: 247Sports: ESPN: (79)				
Overall recruit ranking:
Note: In many cases, Scout, Rivals, 247Sports, On3, and ESPN may conflict in their listings of height and weight.; In these cases, the average was taken. ESPN grades are on a 100-point scale.; Sources: "2025 Villanova Commits". Rivals.; "2025 Team Ranking". Rivals.

== Roster ==
2025–26 Villanova Wildcats men's basketball team
Players
Coaches

Pos.	#	Name	Height	Weight	Year	Previous school	Hometown
G	0	Chris Jefferey	6 ft 3 in (1.91 m)	200 lb (91 kg)	Fr	Mount Zion Prep	Brooklyn, NY
G	1	Zion Stanford	6 ft 6 in (1.98 m)	205 lb (93 kg)	Jr	Temple	Philadelphia, PA
G	2	Bryce Lindsay	6 ft 3 in (1.91 m)	194 lb (88 kg)	RS So	James Madison	Baltimore, MD
G	4	Tyler Perkins	6 ft 4 in (1.93 m)	212 lb (96 kg)	Jr	Penn	Lorton, VA
G	5	Devin Askew	6 ft 5 in (1.96 m)	195 lb (88 kg)	GS	Long Beach State	Sacramento, CA
F	6	Tafara Gapare	6 ft 9 in (2.06 m)	215 lb (98 kg)	Sr	Maryland	Wellington, New Zealand
G	7	Malachi Palmer	6 ft 6 in (1.98 m)	212 lb (96 kg)	So	Maryland	Harrisburg, PA
G	14	Wade Chiddick (W)	6 ft 4 in (1.93 m)	200 lb (91 kg)	Sr	Westtown School	King of Prussia, PA
G	15	Malcolm Flaggs	6 ft 6 in (1.98 m)	212 lb (96 kg)	RS Jr	Grand Canyon	Tuba City, AZ
C	17	Braden Pierce	7 ft 0 in (2.13 m)	245 lb (111 kg)	RS So	Maryland	Woodstock, GA
C	21	Nico Onyekwere	7 ft 1 in (2.16 m)	240 lb (109 kg)	Fr	Long Island Lutheran HS	Abuja, Nigeria
F	24	Duke Brennan	6 ft 10 in (2.08 m)	250 lb (113 kg)	Sr	Grand Canyon	Chandler, AZ
F	33	Matt Hodge	6 ft 8 in (2.03 m)	200 lb (91 kg)	RS Fr	St. Rose HS	Belmar, NJ
G	55	Acaden Lewis	6 ft 2 in (1.88 m)	180 lb (82 kg)	Fr	Sidwell Friends School	Washington, D.C.

Head coach

- Kevin Willard (Pittsburgh)

Assistant coach(es)

- David Cox (William & Mary)
- Kevin Norris (Miami (FL))
- Ashley Howard (Drexel)
- Greg Manning Jr. (Loyola (MD))
- Ricky Harris (UMass)

Legend

- (C) Team captain
- (S) Suspended
- (I) Ineligible
- (W) Walk-on
- Injured
- Current redshirt

Roster

== Schedule and results ==
Date time, TV	Rank^{#}	Opponent^{#}	Result	Record	High points	High rebounds	High assists	Site (attendance) city, state
Exhibition
October 19, 2025*; 5:00 p.m.		VCU	W 70–51		15 – Lewis	7 – Tied	3 – Tied	Finneran Pavilion (4,799); Villanova, PA
October 24, 2025*; 7:00 p.m., ACCNX		at Virginia	L 72–75		16 – Lewis	6 – Perkins	5 – Lewis	John Paul Jones Arena (13,751); Charlottesville, VA
Non-conference regular season
November 3, 2025*; 9:30 p.m., TNT/truTV		vs. No. 8 BYU; Hall of Fame Series – Las Vegas	L 66–71	0–1	22 – Lindsay	15 – Brennan	3 – Lewis	T-Mobile Arena (16,704); Paradise, NV
November 8, 2025*; 7:00 p.m., ESPN+		Queens (NC); Villanova Challenge	W 94–74	1–1	25 – Lindsay	20 – Brennan	4 – Tied	Finneran Pavilion (6,501); Villanova, PA
November 11, 2025*; 7:00 p.m., ESPN+		Sacred Heart; Villanova Challenge	W 94–60	2–1	27 – Lindsay	11 – Brennan	8 – Lewis	Finneran Pavilion (6,501); Villanova, PA
November 15, 2025*; 8:00 p.m., truTV		Duquesne; Villanova Challenge	W 87–77	3–1	19 – Lewis	13 – Brennan	6 – Lewis	Finneran Pavilion (6,501); Villanova, PA
November 19, 2025*; 7:00 p.m., CBSSN		at La Salle; Big 5 Classic Pod 1	W 70–55	4–1	17 – Hodge	17 – Brennan	6 – Lewis	John Glaser Arena (2,653); Philadelphia, PA
November 25, 2025*; 7:00 p.m., ESPN+		Old Dominion	W 89–75	5–1	21 – Perkins	7 – Tied	4 – Lewis	Finneran Pavilion (6,501); Villanova, PA
December 1, 2025*; 6:30 p.m., FS1		Temple; Big 5 Classic Pod 1	W 74–56	6–1	19 – Perkins	8 – Brennan	8 – Lewis	Finneran Pavilion (6,501); Villanova, PA
December 6, 2025*; 7:00 p.m., NBCSP/Peacock		vs. Penn; Big 5 Classic Championship	W 90–63	7–1	18 – Lindsay	10 – Brennan	7 – Lewis	Xfinity Mobile Arena (10,361); Philadelphia, PA
December 9, 2025*; 6:30 p.m., FS1		at No. 2 Michigan	L 61–89	7–2	18 – Askew	6 – Tied	3 – Lewis	Crisler Center (12,707); Ann Arbor, MI
December 13, 2025*; 4:30 p.m., TNT/truTV		Pittsburgh	W 79–61	8–2	24 – Tied	9 – Brennan	7 – Lewis	Finneran Pavilion (6,501); Villanova, PA
December 19, 2025*; 8:00 p.m., FOX		vs. Wisconsin; Milwaukee Hoops Showdown	W 76–66 ^{OT}	9–2	19 – Perkins	11 – Brennan	4 – Tied	Fiserv Forum (7,328); Milwaukee, WI
Big East regular season
December 23, 2025; 7:00 p.m., Peacock		at Seton Hall	W 64–56	10–2 (1–0)	16 – Lewis	10 – Perkins	4 – Lindsay	Prudential Center (11,153); Newark, NJ
December 31, 2025; 6:00 p.m., FS1		DePaul	W 71–66	11–2 (2–0)	19 – Tied	12 – Brennan	3 – Tied	Finneran Pavilion (6,501); Villanova, PA
January 3, 2026; 12:00 p.m., TNT/truTV		at Butler	W 85–67	12–2 (3–0)	18 – Lindsay	10 – Brennan	6 – Lewis	Hinkle Fieldhouse (8,034); Indianapolis, IN
January 7, 2026; 7:30 p.m., Peacock		Creighton	L 72–76	12–3 (3–1)	20 – Lewis	12 – Brennan	7 – Lewis	Finneran Pavilion (6,501); Villanova, PA
January 10, 2026; 2:30 p.m., TNT/truTV		at Marquette	W 76–73	13–3 (4–1)	20 – Lewis	6 – Askew	8 – Lewis	Fiserv Forum (15,342); Milwaukee, WI
January 13, 2026; 6:30 p.m., FS1		at Providence	W 88–82	14–3 (5–1)	20 – Askew	8 – Tied	8 – Lewis	Amica Mutual Pavilion (11,476); Providence, RI
January 17, 2026; 8:00 p.m., Peacock		St. John's	L 79–86	14–4 (5–2)	23 – Perkins	9 – Brennan	5 – Lewis	Xfinity Mobile Arena (14,899); Philadelphia, PA
January 21, 2026; 7:00 p.m., Peacock		Georgetown	W 66–51	15–4 (6–2)	16 – Perkins	10 – Brennan	3 – Brennan	Finneran Pavilion (6,501); Villanova, PA
January 24, 2026; 12:30 p.m., FOX		at No. 2 UConn	L 67–75 ^{OT}	15–5 (6–3)	16 – Tied	14 – Brennan	5 – Lewis	PeoplesBank Arena (15,495); Hartford, CT
January 30, 2026; 7:00 p.m., FS1		Providence	W 87–73	16–5 (7–3)	20 – Askew	8 – Brennan	8 – Lewis	Finneran Pavilion (6,501); Villanova, PA
February 4, 2026; 6:30 p.m., Peacock		Seton Hall	W 72–60	17–5 (8–3)	18 – Perkins	10 – Brennan	6 – Lewis	Finneran Pavilion (6,501); Villanova, PA
February 7, 2026; 12:00 p.m., TNT/truTV		at Georgetown	W 80–73	18–5 (9–3)	26 – Lewis	13 – Brennan	6 – Lewis	Capital One Arena (14,042); Washington, DC
February 10, 2026; 7:30 p.m., TNT/truTV		Marquette	W 77–74	19–5 (10–3)	22 – Perkins	8 – Tied	5 – Lewis	Finneran Pavilion (6,501); Villanova, PA
February 14, 2026; 2:30 p.m., FOX		at Creighton	W 80–69	20–5 (11–3)	21 – Brennan	12 – Brennan	4 – Lewis	CHI Health Center Omaha (16,479); Omaha, NE
February 17, 2026; 6:30 p.m., FS1		at Xavier	W 92–89 ^{OT}	21–5 (12–3)	21 – Lewis	13 – Brennan	6 – Tied	Cintas Center (9,439); Cincinnati, OH
February 21, 2026; 5:30 p.m., TNT/truTV		No. 5 UConn	L 63–73	21–6 (12–4)	15 – Perkins	6 – Perkins	4 – Lewis	Xfinity Mobile Arena (20,261); Philadelphia, PA
February 25, 2026; 7:00 p.m., FS1		Butler	W 82–73	22–6 (13–4)	20 – Lewis	10 – Brennan	5 – Brennan	Finneran Pavilion (6,501); Villanova, PA
February 28, 2026; 8:00 p.m., FOX		at No. 15 St. John's	L 57–89	22–7 (13–5)	12 – Brennan	8 – Brennan	3 – Tied	Madison Square Garden (19,812); New York, NY
March 4, 2026; 8:00 p.m., Peacock		at DePaul	W 76–57	23–7 (14–5)	20 – Perkins	12 – Brennan	5 – Lewis	Wintrust Arena (4,913); Chicago, IL
March 7, 2026; 12:00 p.m., TNT/truTV		Xavier	W 91–78	24–7 (15–5)	20 – Brennan	13 – Brennan	12 – Lewis	Finneran Pavilion (6,501); Villanova, PA
Big East tournament
March 12, 2026; 9:42 p.m., FS1	(3)	vs. (11) Georgetown; Quarterfinal	L 64–78	24–8	14 – Brennan	6 – Brennan	3 – Tied	Madison Square Garden (19,812); New York, NY
NCAA tournament
March 20, 2026; 4:10 p.m., TNT	(8 W)	vs. (9 W) Utah State; First round	L 76–86	24–9	25 – Lindsay	8 – Brennan	8 – Lewis	Viejas Arena (11,418); San Diego, CA
*Non-conference game. ^{#}Rankings from AP poll. (#) Tournament seedings in parentheses. W=West. All times are in Eastern Time.

== Rankings ==
Ranking movements Legend: ██ Increase in ranking ██ Decrease in ranking — = Not ranked RV = Received votes
	Week																				
Poll	Pre	1	2	3	4	5	6	7	8	9	10	11	12	13	14	15	16	17	18	19	Final
AP	—	—	—	—	—	RV	RV	—	—	RV	RV	RV	RV	RV	RV	RV	RV	RV	RV	—	—
Coaches	RV	—	—	—	—	—	—	—	RV	24	RV	RV	RV	RV	RV	RV	RV	RV	RV	RV	RV
