= 2024–25 Marquette Golden Eagles men's basketball team =

American college basketball season

2024–25 Marquette Golden Eagles men's basketball
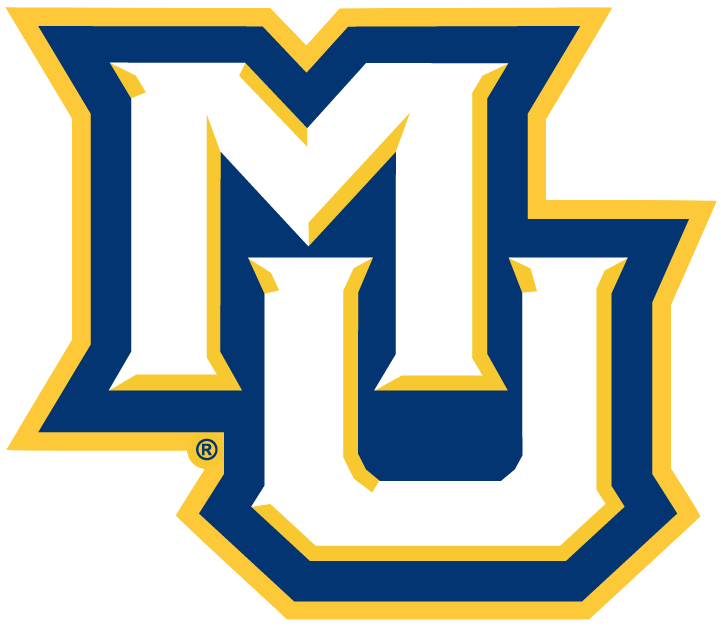

NCAA tournament, First Round
- Conference: Big East Conference
- Record: 23–11 (13–7 Big East)
- Head coach: Shaka Smart (4th season)
- Assistant coaches: Neill Berry (4th season); Cody Hatt (4th season); DeAndre Haynes (4th season); C.J. Rivers (1st season); Nevada Smith (2nd season)
- Home arena: Fiserv Forum (Capacity: 17,341)

2024–25 Big East men's basketball standings
| | Conf. | | | | Overall |
| Team | W | | L | PCT | W | | L | PCT |
|---|---|---|---|---|---|---|---|---|
| No. 11 St. John's † | 18 | – | 2 | .900 | 31 | – | 5 | .861 |
| Creighton | 15 | – | 5 | .750 | 25 | – | 11 | .694 |
| UConn | 14 | – | 6 | .700 | 24 | – | 11 | .686 |
| Xavier | 13 | – | 7 | .650 | 22 | – | 12 | .647 |
| Marquette | 13 | – | 7 | .650 | 23 | – | 11 | .676 |
| Villanova | 11 | – | 9 | .550 | 21 | – | 15 | .583 |
| Georgetown | 8 | – | 12 | .400 | 18 | – | 16 | .529 |
| Providence | 6 | – | 14 | .300 | 12 | – | 20 | .375 |
| Butler | 6 | – | 14 | .300 | 15 | – | 20 | .429 |
| DePaul | 4 | – | 16 | .200 | 14 | – | 20 | .412 |
| Seton Hall | 2 | – | 18 | .100 | 7 | – | 25 | .219 |
† 2025 Big East tournament winner Rankings from AP Poll

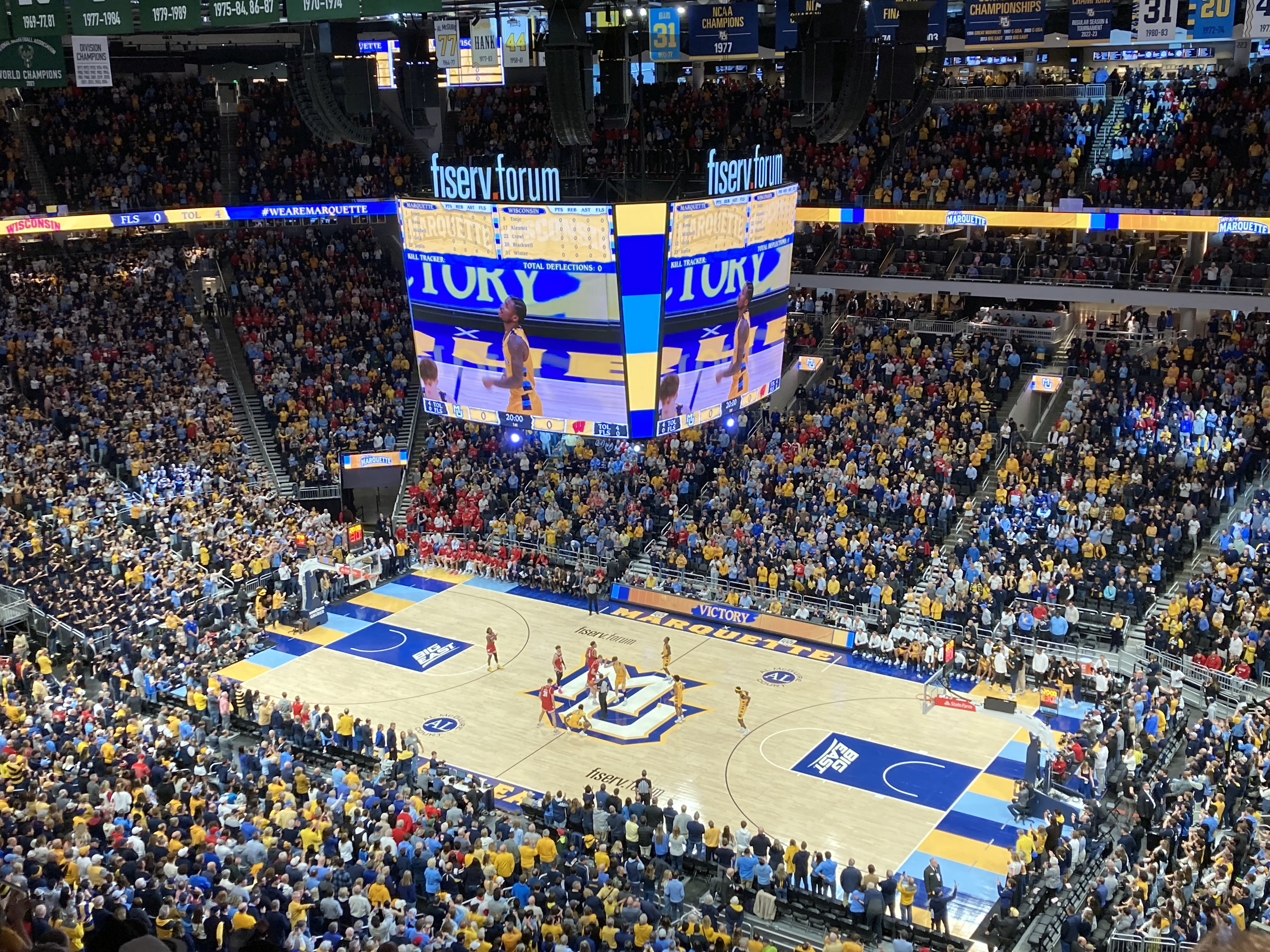
Opening tip of the game against Wisconsin

The 2024–25 Marquette Golden Eagles men's basketball team represented Marquette University during the 2024–25 NCAA Division I men's basketball season. The Golden Eagles, led by fourth-year head coach Shaka Smart, played their home games at Fiserv Forum in Milwaukee, Wisconsin as a member of the Big East Conference.

The Marquette Golden Eagles drew an average home attendance of 15,571, the 9th highest of all college basketball teams.

== Previous season ==
The Golden Eagles finished the 2023–24 season 27–10, 14–6 in Big East play to finish in tie for second place. As a No. 3 seed in the Big East tournament, they defeated Villanova in the quarterfinals and Providence in the semifinals to advance to the championship game, where they lost to UConn. They received an at-large bid to the NCAA tournament as the No. 2 seed in the South region. They defeated Western Kentucky in the first round and Colorado in the second round before getting upset in the sweet sixteen by NC State.

== Offseason ==
=== Departures ===
| Name | Number | Pos. | Height | Weight | Year | Hometown | Reason for departure |
|---|---|---|---|---|---|---|---|
| Tyler Kolek | 11 | G | 6'3" | 200 | (redshirt) Junior | Cumberland, RI | Declare for 2024 NBA draft; selected 34th overall by Portland Trail Blazers |
| Oso Ighodaro | 13 | F | 6'9" | 225 | (redshirt) Junior | Chandler, AZ | Declare for 2024 NBA draft; selected 40th overall by Portland Trail Blazers |
| RJ Walson | 51 | G | 6'0" | 200 | (redshirt) Junior | Chicago, IL | Walk-on; left the team due to personal reasons |

=== Recruiting classes ===
==== 2024 recruiting class ====
College recruiting
| Name | Hometown | School | Height | Weight | Commit date |
|---|---|---|---|---|---|
| Damarius Owens #12 SF | Hudson, OH | Western Reserve Academy | 6 ft 6 in (1.98 m) | 190 lb (86 kg) | Feb 15, 2023 |
| Damarius Owens #12 SF | Recruit ratings: Rivals: 247Sports: ESPN: (83) | | | | |
| Royce Parham #27 PF | Pittsburgh, PA | Western Reserve Academy | 6 ft 8 in (2.03 m) | 210 lb (95 kg) | May 10, 2024 |
| Royce Parham #27 PF | Recruit ratings: Rivals: 247Sports: ESPN: (82) | | | | |
| Joshua Clark; C | Sugar Land, TX | Clements High School | 7 ft 0 in (2.13 m) | 215 lb (98 kg) | May 10, 2024 |
| Joshua Clark; C | Recruit ratings: Rivals: 247Sports: ESPN: (NR) | | | | |
Overall recruit ranking: Rivals: 14 247Sports: 23 ESPN: 17
Note: In many cases, Scout, Rivals, 247Sports, On3, and ESPN may conflict in their listings of height and weight.; In these cases, the average was taken. ESPN grades are on a 100-point scale.; Sources: "2024 Marquette Basketball Commitments". Rivals.; "2024 Team Ranking". Rivals.

==== 2025 recruiting class ====
College recruiting (2025)
| Name | Hometown | School | Height | Weight | Commit date |
|---|---|---|---|---|---|
| Nigel James #19 PG | Huntington, NY | Long Island Lutheran High School | 5 ft 11 in (1.80 m) | 170 lb (77 kg) | Jul 16, 2024 |
| Nigel James #19 PG | Recruit ratings: Rivals: 247Sports: ESPN: (82) | | | | |
| Adrien Stevens #28 SG | Potomac, MD | Bullis School | 6 ft 3 in (1.91 m) | 190 lb (86 kg) | Aug 13, 2024 |
| Adrien Stevens #28 SG | Recruit ratings: Rivals: 247Sports: ESPN: (81) | | | | |
| Ian Miletic; SF | Rolling Meadows, IL | Rolling Meadows High School | 6 ft 7 in (2.01 m) | 180 lb (82 kg) | Jun 12, 2024 |
| Ian Miletic; SF | Recruit ratings: Rivals: 247Sports: ESPN: (NR) | | | | |
| Michael Phillips; SF | Raleigh, NC | Grace Christian School | 6 ft 6 in (1.98 m) | 175 lb (79 kg) | Aug 6, 2024 |
| Michael Phillips; SF | Recruit ratings: Rivals: 247Sports: ESPN: (NR) | | | | |
Overall recruit ranking: Rivals: 14 247Sports: 23 ESPN: 17
Note: In many cases, Scout, Rivals, 247Sports, On3, and ESPN may conflict in their listings of height and weight.; In these cases, the average was taken. ESPN grades are on a 100-point scale.; Sources: "2025 Marquette Basketball Commitments". Rivals.; "2025 Team Ranking". Rivals.

== Roster ==
2024–25 Marquette Golden Eagles men's basketball team
Players
Coaches

| Pos. | # | Name | Height | Weight | Year | Previous school | Hometown |
|---|---|---|---|---|---|---|---|
| G | 1 | Kam Jones | 6 ft 5 in (1.96 m) | 200 lb (91 kg) | Sr | Evangelical Christian | Cordova, TN |
| G | 2 | Chase Ross | 6 ft 5 in (1.96 m) | 205 lb (93 kg) | Jr | Cushing Academy | Dallas, TX |
| G | 4 | Stevie Mitchell | 6 ft 3 in (1.91 m) | 200 lb (91 kg) | Sr | Wilson HS | Reading, PA |
| G | 5 | Tre Norman | 6 ft 4 in (1.93 m) | 210 lb (95 kg) | So | Worcester Academy | Boston, MA |
| G | 7 | Zaide Lowery | 6 ft 5 in (1.96 m) | 200 lb (91 kg) | So | La Lumiere School | Springfield, MO |
| C | 8 | Joshua Clark | 7 ft 1 in (2.16 m) | 215 lb (98 kg) | Fr | Clements HS | Houston, TX |
| F | 10 | Damarius Owens | 6 ft 7 in (2.01 m) | 190 lb (86 kg) | Fr | Western Reserve Academy | Rochester, NY |
| F | 12 | Ben Gold | 6 ft 11 in (2.11 m) | 235 lb (107 kg) | Jr | NBA Global Academy | Wellington, New Zealand |
| F | 13 | Royce Parham | 6 ft 8 in (2.03 m) | 230 lb (104 kg) | Fr | Western Reserve Academy | Pittsburgh, PA |
| F | 21 | Al Amadou | 6 ft 9 in (2.06 m) | 210 lb (95 kg) | So | Chestnut Hill Academy | Philadelphia, PA |
| G | 22 | Sean Jones (injured) | 5 ft 10 in (1.78 m) | 185 lb (84 kg) | Jr | Lincoln HS | Gahanna, OH |
| F | 23 | David Joplin | 6 ft 8 in (2.03 m) | 225 lb (102 kg) | Sr | Brookfield Central HS | Brookfield, WI |
| G | 25 | Jack Anderson (W) | 6 ft 4 in (1.93 m) | 200 lb (91 kg) | Fr | Western HS | Davie, FL |
| F | 35 | Caedin Hamilton | 6 ft 9 in (2.06 m) | 240 lb (109 kg) | RS Fr | St. Joseph HS | Santa Maria, CA |
| G | 40 | Casey O'Malley (W) | 6 ft 3 in (1.91 m) | 200 lb (91 kg) | Jr | Creighton Prep | Omaha, NE |
| G | 41 | Jonah Lucas (W) | 6 ft 1 in (1.85 m) | 175 lb (79 kg) | Jr | Harrison HS | West Lafayette, IN |
| F | 42 | Luke Jacobson (W) | 6 ft 7 in (2.01 m) | 215 lb (98 kg) | Fr | Mission Prep | San Luis Obispo, CA |
| G | 54 | Jake Ciardo (W) | 6 ft 2 in (1.88 m) | 175 lb (79 kg) | Jr | Germantown HS | Germantown, WI |
| G | 55 | Cameron Brown | 6 ft 1 in (1.85 m) | 215 lb (98 kg) | Sr | John Paul II HS | Plano, TX |

Head coach

- Shaka Smart (Kenyon)

Assistant coach(es)

- Neill Berry (Southeastern Louisiana)
- Cody Hatt (Norwich)
- DeAndre Haynes (Kent State)
- C.J. Rivers (Drake)
- Nevada Smith (Bethany (WV))

Legend

- (C) Team captain
- (S) Suspended
- (I) Ineligible
- (W) Walk-on
- Injured
- Current redshirt

Roster

== Schedule and results ==
| Date time, TV | Rank^{#} | Opponent^{#} | Result | Record | High points | High rebounds | High assists | Site (attendance) city, state |
Non-conference regular season
| November 4, 2024*; 7:30 p.m., FS1 | No. 18 | Stony Brook; Marquette Challenge | W 102–62 | 1–0 | 32 – K. Jones | 8 – Ross | 6 – Mitchell | Fiserv Forum (14,546); Milwaukee, WI |
| November 8, 2024*; 8:00 p.m., Peacock | No. 18 | George Mason; Marquette Challenge | W 82–63 | 2–0 | 27 – Joplin | 10 – Joplin | 8 – K. Jones | Al McGuire Center (3,750); Marquette, WI |
| November 11, 2024*; 8:00 p.m., FS1 | No. 15 | Central Michigan; Marquette Challenge | W 70–62 | 3–0 | 17 – Mitchell | 6 – Ross | 8 – K. Jones | Fiserv Forum (14,757); Marquette, WI |
| November 15, 2024*; 7:00 p.m., FS1 | No. 15 | at Maryland | W 78–74 | 4–0 | 28 – K. Jones | 8 – Joplin | 2 – Tied | Xfinity Center (16,124); College Park, MD |
| November 19, 2024*; 8:00 p.m., FS1 | No. 15 | No. 6 Purdue | W 76–58 | 5–0 | 21 – Mitchell | 13 – K. Jones | 10 – K. Jones | Fiserv Forum (16,801); Marquette, WI |
| November 23, 2024*; 10:00 a.m., FloHoops | No. 15 | vs. Georgia; Atlantis Resort Series | W 80–69 | 6–0 | 29 – Joplin | 6 – Tied | 7 – K. Jones | Imperial Arena (822); Nassau, Bahamas |
| November 27, 2024*; 8:00 p.m., FS2 | No. 10 | Stonehill | W 94–59 | 7–0 | 27 – Joplin | 7 – Joplin | 4 – Hamilton | Fiserv Forum (14,715); Marquette, WI |
| November 30, 2024*; 1:00 p.m., FS2 | No. 10 | Western Carolina | W 94–62 | 8–0 | 20 – K. Jones | 6 – K. Jones | 10 – K. Jones | Fiserv Forum (15,442); Marquette, WI |
| December 4, 2024*; 7:00 p.m., ESPN+ | No. 5 | at No. 6 Iowa State; Big East–Big 12 Battle | L 70–81 | 8–1 | 17 – Parham | 8 – K. Jones | 9 – K. Jones | Hilton Coliseum (14,267); Ames, IA |
| December 7, 2024*; 12:30 p.m., FOX | No. 5 | No. 11 Wisconsin; Rivalry | W 88–74 | 9–1 | 32 – K. Jones | 8 – Ross | 6 – K. Jones | Fiserv Forum (18,107); Marquette, WI |
| December 14, 2024*; 6:00 p.m., CBSSN | No. 6 | at Dayton | L 63–71 | 9–2 | 19 – Ross | 6 – Mitchell | 4 – K. Jones | UD Arena (13,407); Dayton, OH |
Big East regular season
| December 18, 2024; 8:00 p.m., FS1 | No. 9 | Butler | W 80–70 | 10–2 (1–0) | 23 – K. Jones | 9 – Mitchell | 5 – K. Jones | Fiserv Forum (15,770); Milwaukee, WI |
| December 21, 2024; 11:00 a.m., FOX | No. 9 | at Xavier | W 72–70 | 11–2 (2–0) | 20 – K. Jones | 5 – Tied | 8 – K. Jones | Cintas Center (10,452); Cincinnati, OH |
| December 31, 2024; 5:00 p.m., FS1 | No. 8 | at Providence | W 78–50 | 12–2 (3–0) | 18 – K. Jones | 6 – Joplin | 10 – K. Jones | Amica Mutual Pavilion (11,604); Providence, RI |
| January 3, 2025; 8:00 p.m., FS1 | No. 8 | Creighton | W 79–71 | 13–2 (4–0) | 22 – K. Jones | 9 – K. Jones | 5 – K. Jones | Fiserv Forum (17,756); Milwaukee, WI |
| January 7, 2025; 7:05 p.m., CBSSN | No. 7 | Georgetown | W 74–66 | 14–2 (5–0) | 27 – Ross | 7 – Joplin | 5 – K. Jones | Fiserv Forum (15,756); Milwaukee, WI |
| January 14, 2025; 6:00 p.m., CBSSN | No. 7 | at DePaul | W 85–83 ^{OT} | 15–2 (6–0) | 30 – Joplin | 6 – K. Jones | 11 – K. Jones | Wintrust Arena (6,416); Chicago, IL |
| January 18, 2025; 1:00 p.m., FOX | No. 7 | Xavier | L 57–59 | 15–3 (6–1) | 18 – Joplin | 13 – Gold | 6 – K. Jones | Fiserv Forum (17,781); Milwaukee, WI |
| January 21, 2025; 7:00 p.m., Peacock | No. 10 | at Seton Hall | W 76–59 | 16–3 (7–1) | 19 – K. Jones | 6 – Mitchell | 4 – Tied | Prudential Center (8,152); Newark, NJ |
| January 24, 2025; 6:00 p.m., FS1 | No. 10 | Villanova | W 87–74 | 17–3 (8–1) | 21 – Mitchell | 9 – Gold | 5 – K. Jones | Fiserv Forum (17,542); Milwaukee, WI |
| January 28, 2025; 7:30 p.m., FS1 | No. 9 | at Butler | W 78–69 | 18–3 (9–1) | 22 – Mitchell | 7 – Gold | 4 – Tied | Hinkle Fieldhouse (7,423); Indianapolis, IN |
| February 1, 2025; 7:00 p.m., FOX | No. 9 | No. 25 UConn | L 69–77 | 18–4 (9–2) | 22 – K. Jones | 5 – Joplin | 5 – K. Jones | Fiserv Forum (18,129); Milwaukee, WI |
| February 4, 2025; 5:30 p.m., FS1 | No. 11 | at No. 12 St. John's | L 64–70 | 18–5 (9–3) | 16 – Ross | 8 – Ross | 2 – Tied | Madison Square Garden (16,521); New York, NY |
| February 8, 2025; 1:00 p.m., FOX | No. 11 | at Creighton | L 67–77 | 18–6 (9–4) | 27 – K. Jones | 8 – Joplin | 6 – Jones | CHI Health Center Omaha (18,185); Omaha, NE |
| February 11, 2025; 7:30 p.m., Peacock | No. 18 | DePaul | W 68–58 | 19–6 (10–4) | 19 – K. Jones | 10 – Joplin | 4 – K. Jones | Fiserv Forum (14,728); Milwaukee, WI |
| February 18, 2025; 8:00 p.m., CBSSN | No. 16 | Seton Hall | W 80–56 | 20–6 (11–4) | 14 – K. Jones | 6 – Tied | 5 – Tied | Fiserv Forum (14,948); Milwaukee, WI |
| February 21, 2025; 6:00 p.m., FS1 | No. 16 | at Villanova | L 66–81 | 20–7 (11–5) | 25 – Lowery | 8 – Lowery | 8 – K. Jones | Wells Fargo Center (10,862); Philadelphia, PA |
| February 25, 2025; 6:00 p.m., FS1 | No. 21 | Providence | W 82–52 | 21–7 (12–5) | 17 – Tied | 6 – Tied | 7 – Jones | Fiserv Forum (16,094); Milwaukee, WI |
| March 1, 2025; 7:00 p.m., Peacock | No. 21 | at Georgetown | W 76–61 | 22–7 (13–5) | 17 – Joplin | 9 – Joplin | 13 – Jones | Capital One Arena (7,729); Washington, D.C. |
| March 4, 2025; 7:30 p.m., FS1 | No. 20 | at UConn | L 66–72 | 22–8 (13–6) | 23 – Joplin | 5 – Tied | 3 – Ross | Gampel Pavilion (10,299); Storrs, CT |
| March 8, 2025; 11:00 a.m., FOX | No. 20 | No. 6 St. John's | L 84–86 ^{OT} | 22–9 (13–7) | 32 – Jones | 9 – Jones | 7 – Jones | Fiserv Forum (17,983); Milwaukee, WI |
Big East tournament
| March 13, 2025; 1:30 p.m., Peacock | (5) No. 25 | vs. (4) Xavier; Quarterfinal | W 89–87 | 23–9 | 28 – Jones | 6 – Tied | 5 – Jones | Madison Square Garden; New York, NY |
| March 14, 2025; 5:40 p.m., FOX | (5) No. 25 | vs. (1) No. 6 St. John's; Semifinal | L 63–79 | 23–10 | 24 – Jones | 9 – Joplin | 2 – Tied | Madison Square Garden; New York, NY |
NCAA tournament
| March 21, 2025*; 6:25 p.m., TBS | (7 S) | vs. (10 S) New Mexico; First Round | L 66–75 | 23–11 | 28 – Joplin | 6 – Gold | 5 – K. Jones | Rocket Arena (17,392); Cleveland, OH |
*Non-conference game. ^{#}Rankings from AP Poll. (#) Tournament seedings in parentheses. S=South. All times are in Central Time.

== Rankings ==
Ranking movements Legend: ██ Increase in ranking ██ Decrease in ranking RV = Received votes
| | Week | | | | | | | | | | | | | | | | | | | | |
| Poll | Pre | 1 | 2 | 3 | 4 | 5 | 6 | 7 | 8 | 9 | 10 | 11 | 12 | 13 | 14 | 15 | 16 | 17 | 18 | 19 | Final |
|---|---|---|---|---|---|---|---|---|---|---|---|---|---|---|---|---|---|---|---|---|---|
| AP | 18 | 15 | 15 | 10 | 5 | 6 | 9 | 8 | 8 | 7 | 7 | 10 | 9 | 11 | 18 | 16 | 21 | 20 | 25 | RV | RV |
| Coaches | 17 | 15 | 14 | 11 | 4 | 4 | 9 | 8 | 8 | 6 | 7 | 10 | 9 | 11 | 16 | 15 | 22 | 20 | 23 | 25 | RV |
