= Nigel James Jr. =

American basketball player

No. 0 – Marquette Golden Eagles
- Position: Point guard
- League: Big East Conference

Personal information
- Born: Harlem, New York, U.S.
- Listed height: 6 ft 0 in (1.83 m)
- Listed weight: 190 lb (86 kg)

Career information
- High school: Long Island Lutheran (Brookville, New York)
- College: Marquette (2025–present)

Career highlights
- Big East Freshman of the Year (2026); Third-team All-Big East (2026); Big East All-Freshman Team (2026)

Nigel James Jr. is an American college basketball player for the Marquette Golden Eagles of the Big East Conference.

== Early life ==
James Jr. attended Long Island Lutheran High School located in Brookville, New York. Coming out of high school, he committed to play college basketball for the Marquette Golden Eagles over Georgia Tech and Rutgers.

== College career ==
On January 10, 2026, James Jr. dropped 31 points in a loss against Villanova. On January 19, he notched a career-high 38 points along with eight assists in an overtime victory over Providence. James Jr. finished his freshman season, appearing in 32 games with 29 starts, averaging 16.4 points, 3.4 rebounds, 4.9 assists, and 1.9 steals per game. For his performance he earned third-team all-Big East honors, all-Big East freshman honors, and was named the Big East freshman of the year.
