= 2024–25 Big East Conference men's basketball season =

- League: NCAA Division I
- Sport: Basketball
- Teams: 11
- TV partner(s): Fox, FS1, CBS, CBSSN, NBC

Regular Season
- Season champions: St. John's
- Runners-up: Creighton
- Season MVP: RJ Luis Jr.

Tournament
- Venue: Madison Square Garden, New York City, New York
- Champions: St. John's
- Runners-up: Creighton
- Finals MVP: RJ Luis Jr.

Basketball seasons
- ← 2023–24 2025–26 →

2024–25 Big East men's basketball standings
	Conf.				Overall
Team	W		L	PCT	W		L	PCT
No. 11 St. John's †	18	–	2	.900	31	–	5	.861
Creighton	15	–	5	.750	25	–	11	.694
UConn	14	–	6	.700	24	–	11	.686
Xavier	13	–	7	.650	22	–	12	.647
Marquette	13	–	7	.650	23	–	11	.676
Villanova	11	–	9	.550	21	–	15	.583
Georgetown	8	–	12	.400	18	–	16	.529
Providence	6	–	14	.300	12	–	20	.375
Butler	6	–	14	.300	15	–	20	.429
DePaul	4	–	16	.200	14	–	20	.412
Seton Hall	2	–	18	.100	7	–	25	.219
† 2025 Big East tournament winner Rankings from AP Poll

The 2024–25 Big East men's basketball season began with practices in October 2024, followed by the start of the 2024–25 NCAA Division I men's basketball season which began in November 2024. Conference play began in December 2024 and ended in March 2025.

== Head coaches ==
=== Coaching changes ===
==== DePaul ====
Following the end of the 2023–24 season, interim head coach Matt Brady was replaced by Chris Holtmann as the 16th head coach of the Blue Demons.

=== Coaches ===
Team	Head coach	Previous job	Years at school	Overall record	Big East record	Big East titles	NCAA Tournaments	NCAA Final Fours	NCAA Championships
Butler	Thad Matta	Ohio State	4	30–33	15–25	0	13	2	0
UConn	Dan Hurley	Rhode Island	7	106–29	71–41	1	6	2	2
Creighton	Greg McDermott	Iowa State	15	245–130	123–82	0	13	0	0
DePaul	Chris Holtmann	Ohio State	1	0–0	0–0	0	7	0	0
Georgetown	Ed Cooley	Providence	2	9–23	2–18	0	0	0	0
Marquette	Shaka Smart	Texas	4	75–30	42–17	1	11	1	0
Providence	Kim English	George Mason	2	21–14	10–10	0	0	0	0
Seton Hall	Shaheen Holloway	St. Peter's	3	42–28	23–17	0	1	0	0
St. John's	Rick Pitino	Iona	2	20–13	11–9	0	21	5	1
Villanova	Kyle Neptune	Fordham	3	35–33	20–20	0	0	0	0
Xavier	Sean Miller	Arizona	8	43–28	24–16	0	11	0	0

Notes:

- Years at school includes 2020–21 season.
- Overall and Big East records are from current school.
- NCAA Tournament appearances, Final Four & Championships include all schools.
- McDermott's MVC conference records, Matta's MCC records, Miller's A-10 records, Hurley's AAC records not included since team began play in the Big East, Pitino does not include vacated wins.

== Preseason ==
=== Preseason Big East poll ===
Prior to the conference's annual media day, conference standings were projected by panel of writers.

Rank	Team	Points
1.	UConn	100 (10)
2.	Creighton	84
3.	Xavier	82
4.	Marquette	74 (1)
5.	St. John's	70
6.	Providence	54
7.	Villanova	44
8.	Butler	36
9.	Georgetown	25
10.	Seton Hall	24
11.	DePaul	12
(first place votes)

=== Preseason All-Big East ===
A select media panel named a preseason All-Big East team and player of the year.

Honor	Recipient
Preseason Player of the Year	Ryan Kalkbrenner, Creighton
Preseason Freshman of the Year	Liam McNeeley, UConn
Preseason All-Big East First Team	Alex Karaban, UConn
Preseason All-Big East First Team	Kam Jones, Marquette
Preseason All-Big East First Team	Bryce Hopkins, Providence
Preseason All-Big East First Team	Kadary Richmond, St. John’s
Preseason All-Big East First Team	Eric Dixon, Villanova
Preseason All-Big East Second Team	Pierre Brooks, Butler
Preseason All-Big East Second Team	Jahmyl Telfort, Butler
Preseason All-Big East Second Team	Deivon Smith, St. John’s
Preseason All-Big East Second Team	Zach Freemantle, Xavier
Preseason All-Big East Second Team	Dayvion McKnight, Xavier
Preseason All-Big East Third Team	Aidan Mahaney, UConn
Preseason All-Big East Third Team	Steven Ashworth, Creighton
Preseason All-Big East Third Team	Jayden Epps, Georgetown
Preseason All-Big East Third Team	Wooga Poplar, Villanova
Preseason All-Big East Third Team	Ryan Conwell, Xavier

=== Preseason All-American teams ===
Player	AP	CBS	Fox Sports
Ryan Kalkbrenner	RV	1st team	1st team
Alex Karaban	RV	2nd team	2nd team
Kam Jones	RV	3rd team	3rd team
Kadary Richmond		2nd team	3rd team

=== Preseason watchlists ===
Below is a table of notable preseason watch lists.

Player	Wooden	Naismith	Naismith DPOY	Robertson	Cousy	West	Erving	Malone	Abdul-Jabbar
Eric Dixon, Villanova		✓						✓	
Bryce Hopkins, Providence		✓						✓	
Samson Johnson, UConn									✓
Kam Jones, Marquette		✓				✓			
Ryan Kalkbrenner, Creighton		✓							✓
Alex Karaban, UConn		✓						✓	
Malik Mack, Georgetown					✓				
Aidan Mahaney, UConn						✓			
Liam McNeeley, UConn		✓					✓		
Kadary Richmond, St. John's		✓				✓			

== Regular season ==
=== Rankings ===
Legend
	Improvement in ranking
	Drop in ranking
	Not ranked previous week
RV	Received votes but were not ranked in Top 25 of poll
NV	No votes received
(Italics)	Number of first place votes

		Pre/ Wk 1	Wk 2	Wk 3	Wk 4	Wk 5	Wk 6	Wk 7	Wk 8	Wk 9	Wk 10	Wk 11	Wk 12	Wk 13	Wk 14	Wk 15	Wk 16	Wk 17	Wk 18	Wk 19	Wk 20	Final
Butler	AP	NV	NV	NV	NV	NV	NV	NV	NV	NV	NV	NV	NV	NV	NV	NV	NV	NV	NV	NV	NV	NV
Butler	C	NV	NV	NV	NV	NV	NV	NV	NV	NV	NV	NV	NV	NV	NV	NV	NV	NV	NV	NV	NV	NV
UConn	AP	3 (11)	3 (7)	2 (7)	2 (6)	25	18	11	11	11	9	14	19	25	19	RV	RV	NV	RV	RV	RV	RV
UConn	C	3 (6)	3 (3)	2 (3)	2 (6)	RV	20	13	14	13	10	13	18	24	18	24	RV	RV	RV	RV	RV	RV
Creighton	AP	15	14	14	21	RV	RV	RV	NV	NV	NV	NV	RV	RV	RV	24	RV	RV	RV	RV	RV	RV
Creighton	C	14	13	13	19	RV	RV	RV	NV	NV	NV	NV	RV	RV	RV	21	RV	25	RV	RV	RV	24
DePaul	AP	NV	NV	NV	NV	RV	NV	NV	NV	NV	NV	NV	NV	NV	NV	NV	NV	NV	NV	NV	NV	NV
DePaul	C	NV	NV	NV	NV	NV	NV	NV	NV	NV	NV	NV	NV	NV	NV	NV	NV	NV	NV	NV	NV	NV
Georgetown	AP	NV	NV	NV	NV	NV	NV	NV	NV	NV	RV	NV	NV	NV	NV	NV	NV	NV	NV	NV	NV	NV
Georgetown	C	NV	NV	NV	NV	NV	NV	NV	NV	NV	NV	NV	NV	NV	NV	NV	NV	NV	NV	NV	NV	NV
Marquette	AP	18	15	15	10	5	6	9	8	8	7	7	10	9	11	18	16	21	20	25	RV	RV
Marquette	C	17	15	14	11	4	4	9	8	8	6	7	10	9	11	16	15	22	20	23	25	RV
Providence	AP	RV	RV	RV	RV	NV	NV	NV	NV	NV	NV	NV	NV	NV	NV	NV	NV	NV	NV	NV	NV	NV
Providence	C	NV	RV	NV	NV	NV	NV	NV	NV	NV	NV	NV	NV	NV	NV	NV	NV	NV	NV	NV	NV	NV
Seton Hall	AP	NV	NV	NV	NV	NV	NV	NV	NV	NV	NV	NV	NV	NV	NV	NV	NV	NV	NV	NV	NV	NV
Seton Hall	C	NV	NV	NV	NV	NV	NV	NV	NV	NV	NV	NV	NV	NV	NV	NV	NV	NV	NV	NV	NV	NV
St. John's	AP	RV	22	22	RV	RV	RV	RV	RV	RV	RV	RV	20	15	12	9	10	7	6	6	5	11
St. John's	C	RV	25	21	RV	RV	RV	RV	24	RV	RV	RV	21	14	10	8	9	7	6	5	5	10
Villanova	AP	NV	NV	NV	NV	NV	NV	NV	NV	NV	NV	NV	NV	NV	NV	NV	NV	NV	NV	NV	NV	NV
Villanova	C	NV	NV	NV	NV	NV	NV	NV	NV	NV	NV	NV	NV	NV	NV	NV	NV	NV	NV	NV	NV	NV
Xavier	AP	RV	RV	RV	22	RV	NV	NV	NV	NV	RV	NV	NV	NV	NV	NV	NV	NV	NV	RV	NV	NV
Xavier	C	RV	RV	RV	22	RV	NV	NV	NV	NV	NV	NV	NV	NV	NV	NV	NV	NV	NV	NV	NV	NV

=== Early season tournaments ===
All 11 Big East teams participated in early season tournaments.

Team	Tournament	Finish
Butler	Arizona Tip-Off	1st
UConn	Maui Invitational	8th
Creighton	Players Era Festival	7th
DePaul	DePaul Classic	1st
Georgetown	Georgetown MTE	1st
Marquette	Marquette Challenge	1st
Providence	Battle 4 Atlantis	8th
Seton Hall	Charleston Classic	3rd
St. John's	Bahamas Championship	3rd
Villanova	Empire Classic	2nd
Xavier	Fort Myers Tip-Off	2nd

=== Big East Players of the Week ===
Throughout the conference regular season, the Big East offices named one or two players of the week and one or two freshmen of the week each Monday.

Week	Player of the week	School	Freshman of the week	School
November 11, 2024	Ryan Kalkbrenner	Creighton	Thomas Sorber	Georgetown
November 17, 2024	Kam Jones	Marquette	Liam McNeeley	UConn
November 25, 2024	Kam Jones (2)	Marquette	Thomas Sorber (2)	Georgetown
December 2, 2024	Jahmyl Telfort	Butler	Thomas Sorber (3)	Georgetown
December 9, 2024	Pop Isaacs	Creighton	Liam McNeeley (2)	UConn
December 16, 2024	Jayden Epps	Georgetown	Liam McNeeley (3)	UConn
December 23, 2024	Alex Karaban	UConn	Liam McNeeley (4)	UConn
January 6, 2025	Eric Dixon	Villanova	Thomas Sorber (4)	Georgetown
January 13, 2025	RJ Luis Jr.	St John's	Ryan Mela	Providence
January 20, 2025	Ryan Kalkbrenner (2)	Creighton	Ryan Mela (2)	Providence
January 27, 2025	Kam Jones (3)	Marquette	Thomas Sorber (5)	Georgetown
February 3, 2025	Solo Ball	UConn	Thomas Sorber (6)	Georgetown
February 10, 2025	RJ Luis Jr. (2)	St John's	Thomas Sorber (7)	Georgetown
February 17, 2025	Zach Freemantle	Xavier	Liam McNeeley (5)	UConn
February 24, 2025	Kadary Richmond	St John's	Liam McNeeley (6)	UConn
March 3, 2025	Eric Dixon (2)	Villanova	Liam McNeeley (7)	UConn

=== Conference matrix ===
This table summarizes the head-to-head results between teams in conference play. Each team is scheduled to play 20 conference games with at least one game against each opponent.

	Butler	UConn	Creighton	DePaul	Georgetown	Marquette	Providence	Seton Hall	St. John's	Villanova	Xavier
vs. Butler	–	0–0	0–0	0–0	0–0	0–0	0–0	0–0	0–0	0–0	0–0
vs. UConn	0–0	–	0–0	0–0	0–0	0–0	0–0	0–0	0–0	0–0	0–0
vs. Creighton	0–0	0–0	–	0–0	0–0	0–0	0–0	0–0	0–0	0–0	0–0
vs. DePaul	0–0	0–0	0–0	–	0–0	0–0	0–0	0–0	0–0	0–0	0–0
vs. Georgetown	0–0	0–0	0–0	0–0	–	0–0	0–0	0–0	0–0	0–0	0–0
vs. Marquette	0–0	0–0	0–0	0–0	0–0	–	0–0	0–0	0–0	0–0	0–0
vs. Providence	0–0	0–0	0–0	0–0	0–0	0–0	–	0–0	0–0	0–0	0–0
vs. Seton Hall	0–0	0–0	0–0	0–0	0–0	0–0	0–0	–	0–0	0–0	0–0
vs. St. John's	0–0	0–0	0–0	0–0	0–0	0–0	0–0	0–0	–	0–0	0–0
vs. Villanova	0–0	0–0	0–0	0–0	0–0	0–0	0–0	0–0	0–0	–	0–0
vs. Xavier	0–0	0–0	0–0	0–0	0–0	0–0	0–0	0–0	0–0	0–0	–
Total	0–0	0–0	0–0	0–0	0–0	0–0	0–0	0–0	0–0	0–0	0–0

== Honors and awards ==
=== Big East Awards ===
2025 Big East Men's Basketball Individual Awards
Award	Recipient(s)
Player of the Year	RJ Luis Jr., St. John's
Coach of the Year	Rick Pitino, St. John's
Defensive Player of the Year	Ryan Kalkbrenner, Creighton
Freshman of the Year	Liam McNeeley, Connecticut
Most Improved Player of the Year	Zuby Ejiofor, St. John’s
Sixth Man Award	Tarris Reed Jr., Connecticut
Sportsmanship Award	Jerome Hunter, Xavier

2025 Big East Men's Basketball All-Conference Teams
First Team	Second Team	Third Team	Freshman Team
†Ryan Kalkbrenner, Creighton; Micah Peavy, Georgetown †Kam Jones, Marquette; Zuby Ejiofor, St. John’s †RJ Luis Jr., St. John’s †Eric Dixon, Villanova	Solo Ball, Connecticut; Alex Karaban, Connecticut; Steven Ashworth, Creighton; Kadary Richmond, St. John’s; Zach Freemantle, Xavier	Jahmyl Telfort, Butler; Liam McNeeley, Connecticut; Thomas Sorber, Georgetown; David Joplin, Marquette; Wooga Poplar, Villanova; Ryan Conwell, Xavier	†Liam McNeeley, Connecticut Jackson McAndrew, Creighton †Thomas Sorber, Georgetown; Royce Parham, Marquette; Oswin Erhunmwunse, Providence; Ryan Mela, Providence
† - denotes unanimous selection

== Postseason ==
=== Big East tournament ===
First round Wednesday, March 12; Peacock
8	Providence	69
9	Butler	75
7	Georgetown	67
10	DePaul	71
6	Villanova	67
11	Seton Hall	55

Quarterfinals; Thursday, March 13; Peacock/FS1
1	6 St. John's	78
9	Butler	57
4	Xavier	87
5	25 Marquette	89
2	Creighton	85^{2OT}
10	DePaul	81
3	UConn	73
6	Villanova	56

Semifinals; Friday, March 14; FOX
1	6 St. John's	79
5	25 Marquette	63
2	Creighton	71
3	UConn	62

Championship; Saturday, March 15; FOX
1	6 St. John's	82
2	Creighton	66

=== NCAA Tournament ===
The winner of the Big East Tournament will receive the conference's automatic bid to the NCAA tournament.

Seed	Region	School	First Four	First round	Second round	Sweet Sixteen	Elite Eight	Final Four	Championship
2	West	St. John's	Bye	W 83–53 vs. (15) Omaha	L 66–75 vs. (10) Arkansas	DNP			
7	South	Marquette	Bye	L 66–75 vs. (10) New Mexico	DNP				
8	West	UConn	Bye	W 67–59 vs. (9) Oklahoma	L 75–77 vs. (1) Florida	DNP			
9	South	Creighton	Bye	W 89–75 vs. (8) Louisville	L 70–82 vs. (1) Auburn	DNP			
11	Midwest	Xavier	W 86–80 vs. (11) Texas	L 73–86 vs. (6) Illinois	DNP				
		W–L (%):	1–0 (1.000)	3–2 (.600)	0–3 (.000)	0–0 (–)	0–0 (–)	0–0 (–)	0–0 (–)
Total: 4–5 (.444)

=== National Invitation Tournament ===
Villanova, Georgetown, Butler, and Providence were invitated to the National Invitation Tournament, but all schools declined the invite.

=== College Basketball Crown ===
The following Big East teams will receive invitations to the inaugural College Basketball Crown tournament.

School	First round	Second round	Semifinals	Finals
Villanova	W 85−64 vs. Colorado	W 60−59 vs. USC	L 98−104^{OT} vs. UCF	DNP
Georgetown	W 85−82 vs. Washington State	L 69−81 vs. Nebraska	DNP	
Butler	W 86−84 vs. Utah	L 93−100 vs. Boise State	DNP	
DePaul	L 61−83 vs. Cincinnati	DNP		
W–L (%):	3–1 (.750)	1–2 (.333)	0–1 (.000)	0–0 (–)
Total: 4–4 (.500)

== NBA draft ==
PG	Point guard	SG	Shooting guard	SF	Small forward	PF	Power forward	C	Center

Player	Team	Round	Pick #	Position	School
(United States) Thomas Sorber	Oklahoma City Thunder	1	15	C	Georgetown
(United States) Liam McNeeley	Phoenix Suns	1	29	SF	UConn
(United States) Ryan Kalkbrenner	Charlotte Hornets	2	34	C	Creighton
(United States) Kam Jones	San Antonio Spurs	2	38	SG	Marquette
(United States) Micah Peavy	Washington Wizards	2	40	SF	Georgetown
