= Alice Deal =

Educator

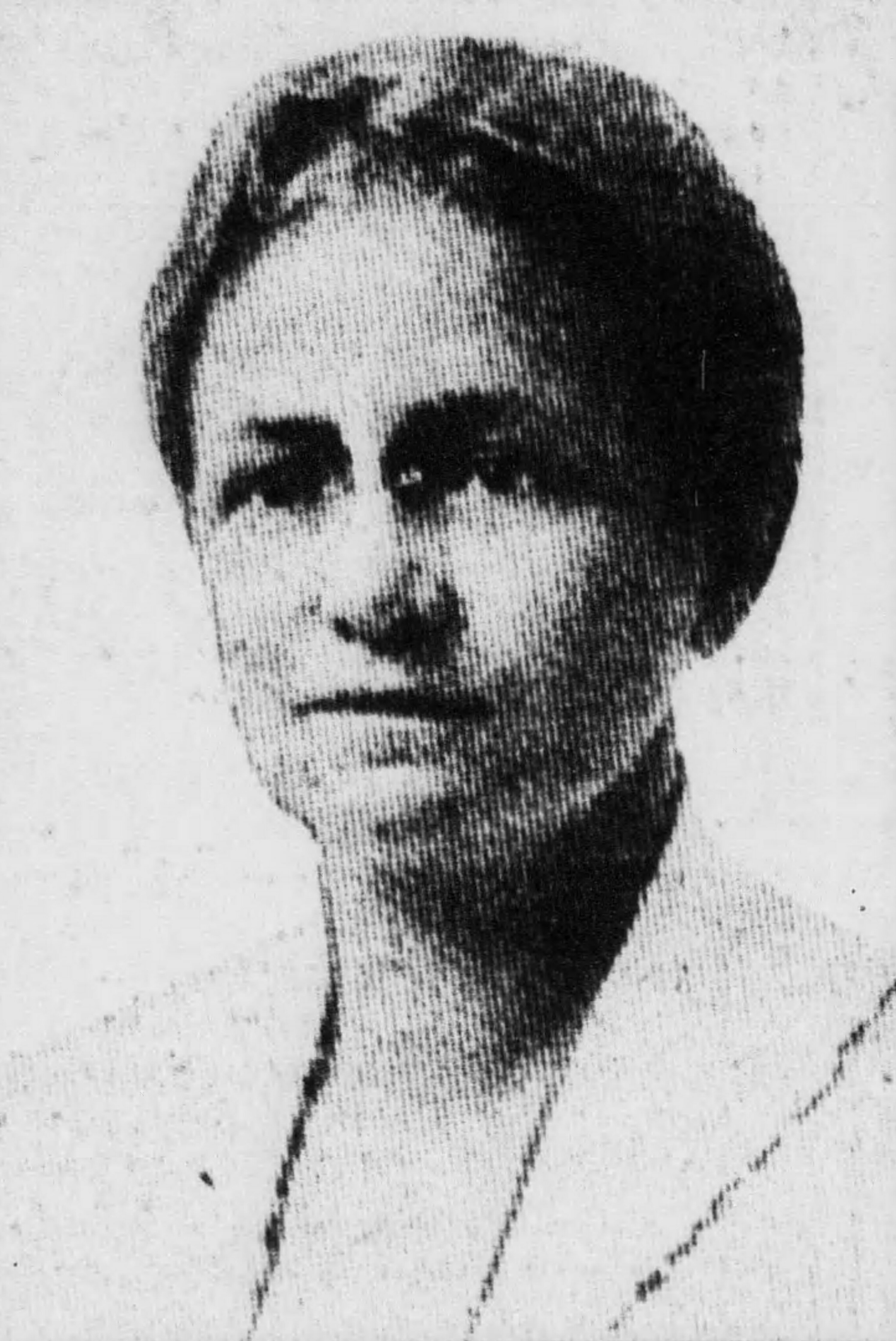
- Born: December 16, 1877; Hampstead, Maryland, US
- Died: March 31, 1928 (aged 50); District of Columbia, US

Alice Deal (December 16, 1877 – March 31, 1928) was an American educator who was the first female principal in the District of Columbia. The Alice Deal Middle School in Washington, D.C., United States, is named after her.

== Education and career ==
Deal attended the Women's College of Baltimore, now known as Goucher College, in Towson, Maryland, graduating in 1899. On February 11, 1908 she started teaching mathematics at the McKinley Manual Training School where she would remain until 1919, with a break for war service from October 2, 1918, until December 30, 1918. She then moved to Columbia Junior High School and became principal on March 6, 1920, and served as the head of the teachers' union. Deal was the first female principal in the District of Columbia. Deal remained as principal until her death in 1928. Deal also organized and raised funds for the first summer high school in the area. The first summer school was held at the Friend's Select School. Deal served as principal for the summer school from 1916 until 1926.

== Impact and honors ==
Prior to Deal's activities, schooling consisted of eight years of elementary school and four years of high school. Deal advocated for change and the system became one with six years of elementary school, three years of junior high school, and three years of senior high school. After her death, the Alice Deal Memorial Association was established in 1928 with the first goal of the society to rename the Reno Junior High School the Alice Deal Junior High School. Construction of the school began in 1930. In 1932, a tribute to honor Deal was held at the school, which was renamed the Alice Deal Junior High School. During the ceremony, there was a tablet posted at the school, and multiple people spoke on the occasion and a photograph of Deal was unveiled during the ceremony. When the school first opened it was for white students only.

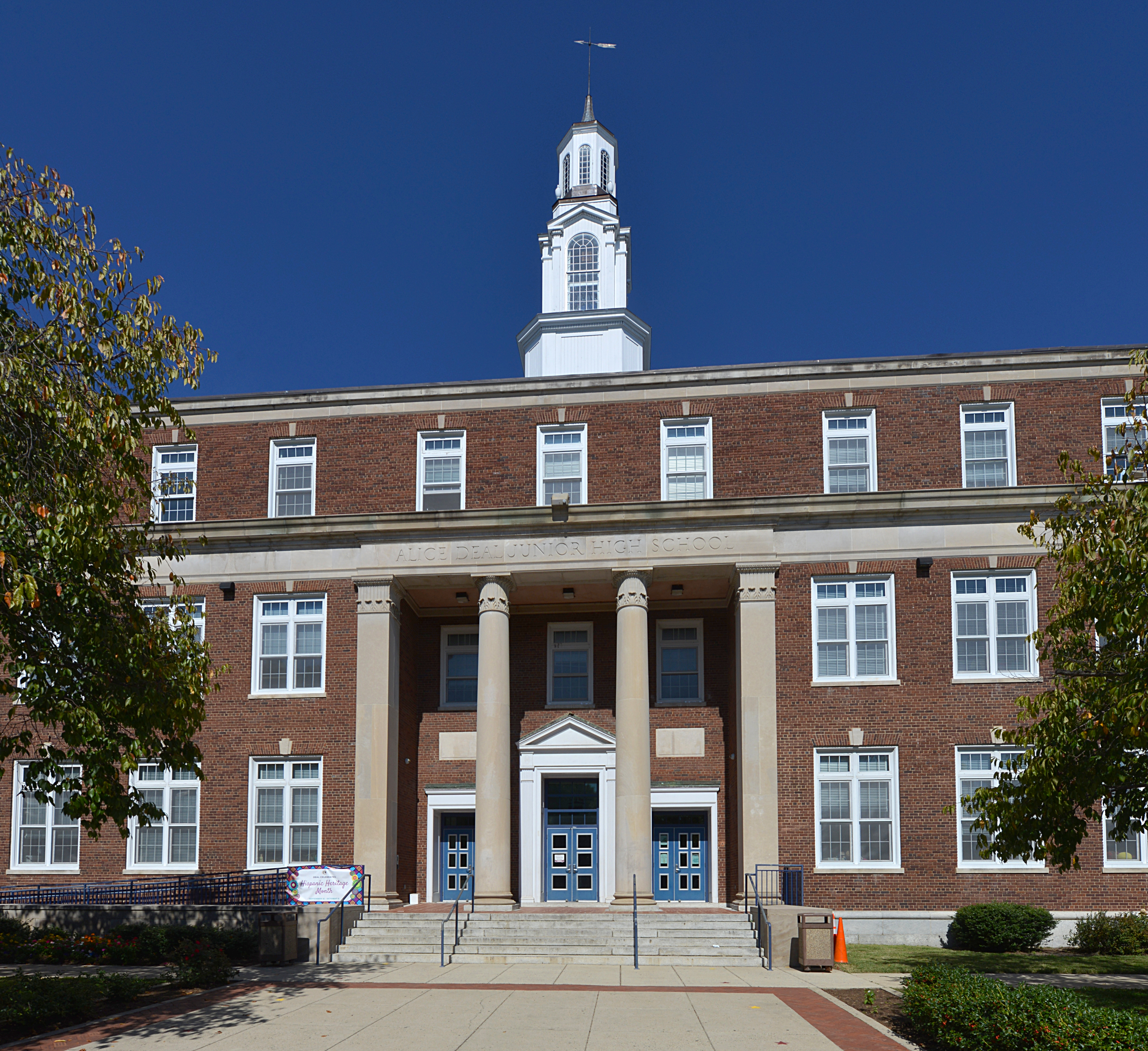
The entrance to Alice Deal Middle School, part of the District of Columbia Public Schools system.
