= Nevada Smith (basketball) =

American college basketball coach (born 1981)

Current position
- Title: Head Coach
- Team: Siena
- Conference: MAAC
- Record: 4–2 (.667)

Biographical details
- Born: June 20, 1981 (age 45); Vandergrift, Pennsylvania, U.S.
- Education: Bethany (WV) ('02)

Coaching career (HC unless noted)
- 2002–2004: St. Lawrence (assistant)
- 2004–2005: SUNY Canton
- 2005–2006: Allegheny (assistant)
- 2006–2011: Ithaca (assistant)
- 2011–2013: Keystone
- 2013–2015: Rio Grande Valley Vipers
- 2016–2019: Sioux Falls Skyforce
- 2023–2026: Marquette (assistant)
- 2026–present: Siena

Administrative career (AD unless noted)
- 2020–2021: Texas (Director of Program Development)
- 2021–2023: Marquette (Special Assistant to the Head Coach)

Head coaching record
- Overall: 4–2 (.667)

Nevada Smith (born June 20, 1981) is an American college basketball coach who is currently the head coach at Siena University. He has previously held coaching positions at the collegiate and professional levels.

== Playing career ==
Smith played collegiately at Bethany College, scoring 1,255 points during his four-year tenure (1998–2002), good for a fifth place on the school's all-time scoring list. As a junior, he ranked first in the nation in three-pointers per game, he hit a total of 313 shots from long range during his college career, which ranked him 13th among all NCAA Division 3 players. After graduating with a degree in sports management from Bethany College in 2002, he pursued a master's degree, which he earned from St. Lawrence University in 2004.

== Coaching career ==
=== Division III (2002–2013) ===
Smith served as assistant coach at St. Lawrence from 2002 to 2004 and was named head coach at State University of New York at Canton for the 2004–05 campaign. In 2005–06, Smith was an assistant coach and head junior varsity coach at Allegheny College. From 2006 to 2011, he served as assistant coach at Ithaca College and took over the head coaching job at Keystone College in 2011.

=== G League (2013–2019) ===
He left Keystone for the NBA D-League in 2013, taking over as head coach of the Rio Grande Valley Vipers. During his two-year tenure, he guided the Vipers to a 57–43 record.

In 2016, Smith returned as a head coach of another D-League team, the Sioux Falls Skyforce. He spent three seasons with the Miami Heat's affiliate, earning a 78–72 record and no playoff appearances.

=== Assistant to Shaka Smart (2020–2026) ===
In September 2020, Smith was named Director of Program Development for the Texas Longhorns.

When Texas head coach Shaka Smart took the head coaching position at Marquette University, Smith followed. He served as Special Assistant to the Head Coach at Marquette for two years before being named a full-time assistant coach in 2023.

=== Siena (2026–present) ===
On April 1, 2026, it was announced that Smith would be the next head men's basketball coach at Siena University.

== Head coaching record ==
Record table
Season	Team	Overall	Conference	Standing	Postseason
Siena Saints (Metro Atlantic Athletic Conference) (2026–present)
2026–27	Siena	4–2	0–0		
Siena:		4–2 (.667)	0–0 (–)		
Total:		4–2 (.667)			
National champion Postseason invitational champion Conference regular season champion Conference regular season and conference tournament champion Division regular season champion Division regular season and conference tournament champion Conference tournament champion
