= Pop Isaacs =

American basketball player (born 2003)

No. 2 – Oklahoma Sooners
- Position: Point guard
- Conference: Southeastern Conference

Personal information
- Born: August 24, 2003 (age 23) Pasadena, California, U.S.
- Listed height: 6 ft 2 in (1.88 m)
- Listed weight: 185 lb (84 kg)

Career information
- High school: Wasatch Academy (Mount Pleasant, Utah); Coronado (Henderson, Nevada)
- College: Texas Tech (2022–2024); Creighton (2024–2025); Texas A&M (2025–2026); Oklahoma (2026–present)

Career highlights
- Third-team All-Big 12 (2024)

Richard Corey “Pop” Isaacs (born August 24, 2003) is an American college basketball player for the Oklahoma Sooners of the Southeastern Conference (SEC). He previously played for the Texas Tech Red Raiders, Creighton Bluejays, and Texas A&M Aggies.

== Early life and high school ==
Isaacs attended Coronado High School. Coming out of high school, he was rated as a four-star recruit and committed to play college basketball for the Texas Tech Red Raiders.

== College career ==
=== Texas Tech ===
As a freshman in 2022-23, Isaacs appeared in 25 games with 24 starts, where he averaged 11.5 points, 2.7 assists, 1.1 steals and 2.0 rebounds per game, en route to being named to the Big 12 Conference all-freshman team. On January 6, 2024, he tallied 21 points in a win over rival Texas. On January 20, Isaacs notched a career-high 32 points and six threes in a comeback victory over BYU. In the quarterfinals of the 2024 Big 12 tournament, he recorded 22 points in a win versus BYU. During the 2023-24 season, Isaacs averaged 15.8 points, 3.2 rebounds and 3.4 assists in 34 games and was named third-team all-Big 12. After the season, he entered his name into the NCAA transfer portal.

=== Creighton ===
Isaacs transferred to play for the Creighton Bluejays. On November 27, 2024, he recorded 25 points and six assists in a loss to Texas A&M. On December 4, Isaacs put up 27 points in a win against Kansas. During the 2024-25 season, he averaged 16.3 points, 4.8 rebounds, and 3.9 assists per game, in just eight games before suffering a season-ending hip injury. After the season, Isaacs once again entered his name into the NCAA transfer portal.

=== Texas A&M ===
While recovering from his injury, Isaacs primarily came off the bench for Texas A&M. He averaged 9.8 points, 2.6 assists and 2.5 rebounds per game. Following the season he entered the transfer portal and committed to Oklahoma.

== Career statistics ==
Legend
GP	Games played	GS	Games started	MPG	Minutes per game
FG%	Field goal percentage	3P%	3-point field goal percentage	FT%	Free throw percentage
RPG	Rebounds per game	APG	Assists per game	SPG	Steals per game
BPG	Blocks per game	PPG	Points per game	**Bold**	Career high

=== College ===
Year	Team	GP	GS	MPG	FG%	3P%	FT%	RPG	APG	SPG	BPG	PPG
2022–23	Texas Tech	25	24	28.7	.368	.378	**.896**	2.0	2.7	**1.1**	0.0	11.5
2023–24	Texas Tech	**34**	**34**	**32.8**	.349	.293	.836	3.2	3.5	1.0	**0.1**	15.8
2024–25	Creighton	8	8	31.6	.410	.383	.862	**4.8**	**3.9**	0.5	**0.1**	**16.3**
2025–26	Texas A&M	33	8	22.3	**.422**	**.396**	.760	2.5	2.6	0.7	**0.1**	9.8
**Career**		**100**	**74**	**28.2**	**.376**	**.349**	**.829**	**2.8**	**3.0**	**0.9**	**0.1**	**12.8**

== Personal life ==
On January 5, 2024, Isaacs was accused of sexually assaulting a minor during a team trip to the Bahamas in November 2023. In April 2024, the case was dismissed in Lubbock's 237th District Court.
