= Devin Askew =

American basketball player (born 2002)

No. 5 – Löwen Braunschweig
- Position: Point guard / shooting guard
- League: Basketball Bundesliga

Personal information
- Born: July 26, 2002 (age 24) Los Angeles, California, U.S.
- Listed height: 6 ft 4 in (1.93 m)
- Listed weight: 195 lb (88 kg)

Career information
- High school: Mater Dei (Santa Ana, California)
- College: Kentucky (2020–2021); Texas (2021–2022); California (2022–2024); Long Beach State (2024–2025); Villanova (2025–2026)
- NBA draft: 2026: undrafted
- Playing career: 2026–present

Career history
- 2026–present: Löwen Braunschweig

Career highlights
- Big East Sixth Man of the Year (2026)
Medals
Men's 3x3 basketball
Representing the United States
FIBA Under-18 World Cup
Gold medal – first place	2019 Mongolia	Team

Devin Ryan Askew (born July 26, 2002) is an American professional basketball player for Löwen Braunschweig of the German Basketball Bundesliga (BBL). He played college basketball for the Kentucky Wildcats, Texas Longhorns, California Golden Bears, Long Beach State Beach, and Villanova Wildcats.

== High school career ==
Askew attended Mater Dei High School in Santa Ana, California. He entered the starting lineup in his sophomore season. As a junior, Askew averaged 17 points, six assists and five rebounds per game. He was named Orange County Player of the Year by the Orange County Register and Trinity League MVP. Askew scored a career-high 43 points in a win against Rancho Christian School. He led Mater Dei to the CIF Southern Section Open Division title game. He also competed for Team WhyNot, an Amateur Athletic Union program sponsored by Russell Westbrook, and trained with Darren Collison. He was selected to the Jordan Brand Classic roster.

=== Recruiting ===
On October 17, 2019, Askew committed to playing college basketball for Kentucky over offers from Louisville, Arizona and Memphis, among others. He was one of the highest-ranked point guards in the 2021 class before reclassifying to the 2020 class following his junior season.

College recruiting
Name	Hometown	School	Height	Weight	Commit date
Devin Askew; PG	Sacramento, CA	Mater Dei (CA)	6 ft 3 in (1.91 m)	195 lb (88 kg)	Oct 17, 2019
Devin Askew; PG	Recruit ratings: Rivals: 247Sports: ESPN: (91)				
Overall recruit ranking: Rivals: 33 247Sports: 37 ESPN: 26
Note: In many cases, Scout, Rivals, 247Sports, On3, and ESPN may conflict in their listings of height and weight.; In these cases, the average was taken. ESPN grades are on a 100-point scale.; Sources: "Kentucky 2020 Basketball Commitments". Rivals.; "2020 Kentucky Wildcats Recruiting Class". ESPN.; "2020 Team Ranking". Rivals.

== College career ==
Askew was a starter for most of his freshman season at Kentucky despite struggling. As a freshman, he averaged 6.5 points and 2.9 assists per game, as his team finished with a 9–16 record. After the season, Askew transferred to Texas.

As a sophomore, Askew saw his minutes cut in half due to the depth the Longhorns had. He averaged 2.1 points, 0.9 rebounds, and 1.3 assists per game in 14.9 minutes a game. Askew played in 34 games but only started in 3 of them. After the season, Askew transferred to California.

In his junior year, Askew had his most productive year yet despite playing in just 13 games. He averaged 15.5 points, 3.4 rebounds, and 3.0 assists per game in 31.8 minutes a game, before going down with a hernia injury. In his senior year, Askew was only able to play 6 games before he injured his foot. At the end of his senior season, Askew transferred to Long Beach State.

At Long Beach State, Askew led the team in points per game, minutes played, steals, and assists. He led the Big West conference in free throw percentage and assists. He was named an Honorable Mention for the All Big West year end awards. He entered the transfer portal before choosing Villanova of the Big East Conference as his next stop for the 2025-2026 season.

At Villanova, Askew started 2 games, coming off the bench in his other 31 appearances. He ended the season with his best 3pt shooting percentage of his career at 40.6% on 4.8 attempts per game. He was named the Big East Conference's Sixth Man of the Year.

== Professional career ==
After going undrafted in the 2026 NBA draft, Askew joined the Phoenix Suns for the 2026 NBA Summer League.

== National team career ==
Askew represented the United States and won its first gold medal in the event at the 2019 FIBA 3x3 Under-18 World Cup in Ulaanbaatar, Mongolia. He was teammates with Nimari Burnett, Dawson Garcia and Ethan Morton.

== Career statistics ==
Legend
GP	Games played	GS	Games started	MPG	Minutes per game
FG%	Field goal percentage	3P%	3-point field goal percentage	FT%	Free throw percentage
RPG	Rebounds per game	APG	Assists per game	SPG	Steals per game
BPG	Blocks per game	PPG	Points per game	**Bold**	Career high

=== College ===
Year	Team	GP	GS	MPG	FG%	3P%	FT%	RPG	APG	SPG	BPG	PPG
2020–21	Kentucky	25	20	28.9	.345	.278	.806	2.6	2.9	.9	**.3**	6.5
2021–22	Texas	**34**	3	14.9	.400	.320	.545	.9	1.3	.8	.1	2.1
2022–23	California	13	13	31.8	.378	.299	.865	3.4	3.0	.7	.2	15.5
2023–24	California	6	3	24.3	.313	.143	.789	4.2	2.5	.7	–	6.2
2024–25	Long Beach State	32	**32**	**36.0**	**.401**	.376	**.886**	**4.6**	**4.5**	**1.5**	.1	**18.9**
2025–26	Villanova	33	2	23.2	**.401**	**.406**	.872	2.6	2.1	1.1	.1	9.8
Career		143	73	25.9	.388	.355	.843	2.8	2.7	1.0	.1	9.8
