= Blake Harper =

American basketball player (born 2005)

No. 2 – VCU Rams
- Position: Shooting guard
- League: Atlantic 10 Conference

Personal information
- Born: September 30, 2005 (age 21)
- Listed height: 6 ft 7 in (2.01 m)
- Listed weight: 220 lb (100 kg)

Career information
- High school: Gonzaga (Washington, D.C.)
- College: Howard (2024–2025); Creighton (2025–2026); VCU (2026–present)

Career highlights
- MEAC Player of the Year (2025); First-team All-MEAC (2025); MEAC Rookie of the Year (2025)

Blake Harper (born September 30, 2005) is an American college basketball player for the VCU Rams of the Atlantic 10 Conference. He previously played for the Creighton Bluejays and the Howard Bison.

== Career ==
Harper attended Gonzaga College High School in Washington, D.C. He committed to play college basketball at Howard University over offers from Fordham and Radford. Despite being an unranked recruit, Harper made an immediate impact as a true freshman. In his first season at Howard, he led the Bison in scoring and rebounding. In a game against Virginia Lynchburg, he recorded a triple-double, totaling 30 points, 13 rebounds, and 10 assists. At the conclusion of the regular season, Harper was named the MEAC Player of the Year and Rookie of the Year.

On April 27, 2025, Harper announced his decision to transfer to Creighton University to play for the Creighton Bluejays.

== Career statistics ==
Legend
GP	Games played	GS	Games started	MPG	Minutes per game
FG%	Field goal percentage	3P%	3-point field goal percentage	FT%	Free throw percentage
RPG	Rebounds per game	APG	Assists per game	SPG	Steals per game
BPG	Blocks per game	PPG	Points per game	**Bold**	Career high

=== College ===
Year	Team	GP	GS	MPG	FG%	3P%	FT%	RPG	APG	SPG	BPG	PPG
2024–25	Howard	32	32	34.4	.447	.404	.825	6.2	3.4	1.0	.0	19.5
