= Dositej Obradović High School =

Dositej Obradović Theoretical High School
- Гимназија Доситеј Обрадовић
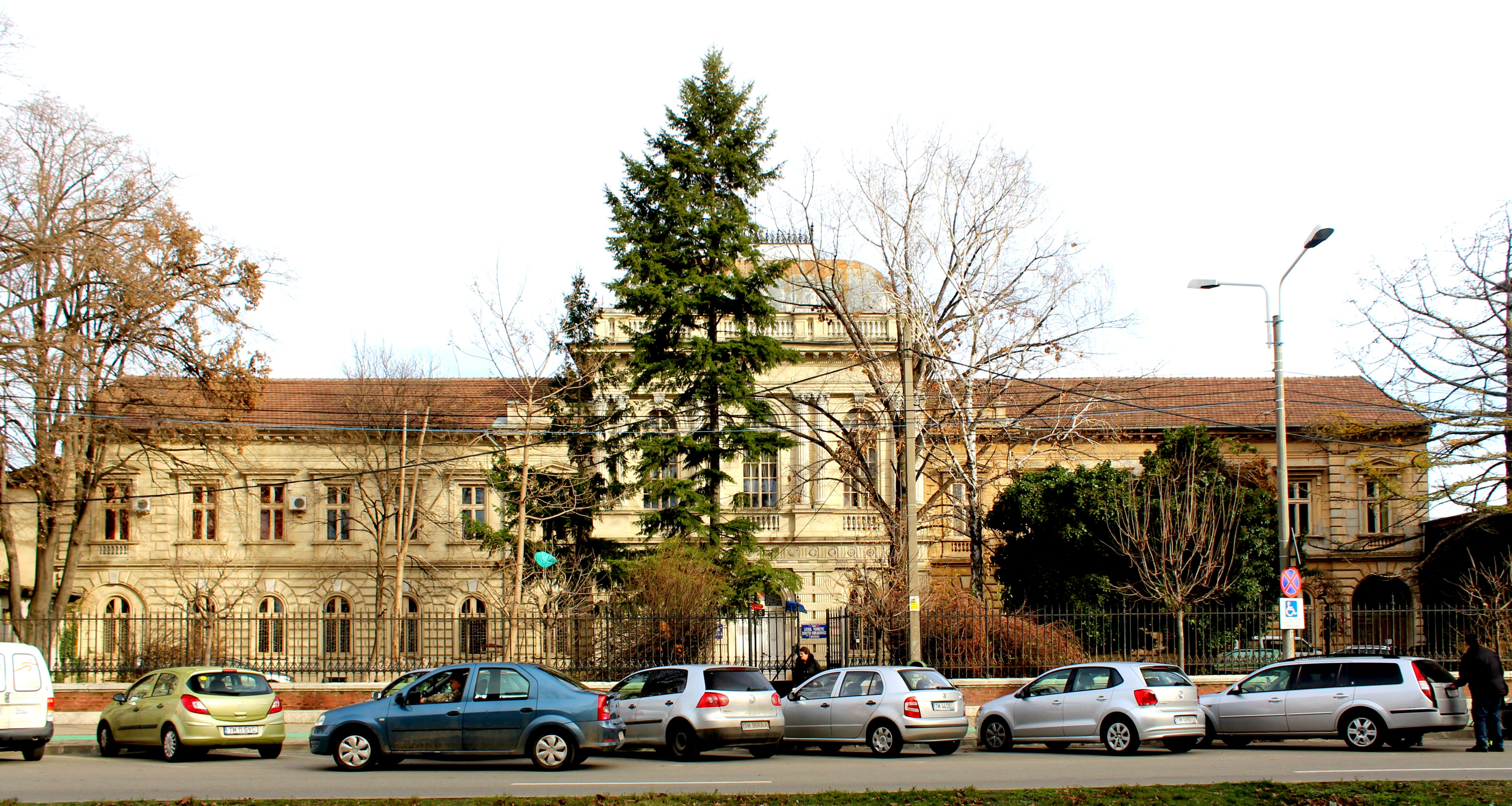

Location
- 6 General Ion Dragalina Boulevard; Timișoara, Timiș County; Romania
- Coordinates: 45.7444234°N 21.2124553°E

Information
- School type: Public, theoretical high school
- Motto: A school for community, a community for school
- Established: 1990; 36 years ago
- Authority: Ministry of National Education
- Principal: Alexandra Stoicov
- Enrollment: <250
- Language: Serbian
- Website: obradovici.ro

Dositej Obradović Theoretical High School (Romanian: Liceul Teoretic „Dositei Obradovici”; Serbian: Гимназија Доситеј Обрадовић, romanized: Gimnazija Dositej Obradović) is a Serbian-language high school in Timișoara. It is the only high school with teaching in the Serbian language in Romania.

The school is located in a building that was once part of the former complex of the Sisters of Notre Dame Order. The building in eclectic historicist style was built in 1881 according to the plans of architect Eduard Reiter.

== History ==
Until 1919, schools teaching in Serbian were denominational institutions. After that year, they became state-run. Between 1919 and 1948, Serbian-language primary schools operated in 54 localities. Students wishing to pursue further education typically attended one of the high schools in Timișoara, such as the Piarist High School, Carmen Sylva High School, or Constantin Diaconovici Loga High School. In 1934, Romania and Yugoslavia signed the Convention on Education in the Mother Tongue in Banat, which led to the establishment of Serbian-language classes at the Constantin Diaconovici Loga High School in Timișoara, and Romanian-language classes at the high school in Vršac. To meet staffing needs, teachers from Yugoslavia were employed. This Serbian-language section operated from 1934 to 1948. During that time, 256 out of 400 enrolled students successfully graduated.

Following the 1948 education reform, the Serbian Mixed High School was established and operated from 1948 to 1953. It was succeeded by Serbian Medium School No. 8 (1953–1960), and later by Serbian Medium School No. 6 (1960–1961), which offered both Serbian and Romanian language sections during its final year. At the time, the school comprised several departments: a gymnasium, a high school, a Serbian-language agricultural technical school (until 1952), and a pedagogical school (until 1958), all of which offered both full-time and part-time programs. To address the need for qualified educators in Serbian-speaking villages, the school also organized one-year training courses for teachers (until 1953) and for kindergarten educators.

In 1960, there were 245 Serbian students enrolled—107 in grades I–VII and 138 in grades VIII–XI. Given that this number was too low to support the continuation of a separate Serbian-language institution, the authorities merged several schools, creating High School No. 1. In 1965, it was renamed High School No. 10. The new institution offered instruction in Romanian, Hungarian, German, and Serbian, across various academic tracks, with both day and evening classes.

In 1977, a reorganization of the school network resulted in the institution being renamed the Timișoara Philology–History High School, with sections in Romanian, Serbian, and German. Over the years, the school has offered various academic tracks. For the Romanian section, both day and evening programs were available. The Serbian-language section also featured a diverse range of specializations, including philology–history, mathematics–physics, electrotechnics, mechanics, and woodworking. However, not all these tracks operated simultaneously—only the philology–history track was offered continuously throughout the school's history.

In 1990, the present-day Dositej Obradović Theoretical High School was established. It was named in honor of the Enlightenment scholar Dositej Obradović, renowned for his role in reforming the literary language and laying the foundations of modern Serbian education.

== Current status ==
The institution offers a complete educational pathway, from the preparatory class through to the 12th grade. At the high school level, it follows a theoretical curriculum with two specializations: philology and mathematics–computer science. It is the only high school in Romania where instruction is conducted in the Serbian language.

In the past, the majority of students at the high school came from villages that offered Serbian-language education up to the eighth grade. Today, however, such primary schools no longer exist in those villages. To support students from more remote areas, the high school provides partial financial assistance for boarding and has also organized daily transportation for students living in Timișoara and within a 30-kilometer radius. Despite these efforts, the total number of students remains below 250.

Given the low student enrollment, the high school also accepts applicants who completed primary school in Romanian, as long as they pass a Serbian language proficiency test. In practice, the test is largely a formality, as candidates are warmly welcomed.

== Awards and distinctions ==
In 1993, the Dositej Obradović Theoretical High School received the Vuk Stefanović Karadžić Award from the Serbian Ministry of Culture. It was the only school outside Serbia to be granted this honor, in recognition of its contributions to preserving and promoting Serbian culture.

In 2007, the school was honored with the gold medal by the Government of Serbia for its exceptional efforts in promoting the national language and culture. This award also acknowledged the school's vital role in preserving Serbian traditions.
