= 2024–25 Creighton Bluejays men's basketball team =

American college basketball season

2024–25 Creighton Bluejays men's basketball

NCAA tournament, Second Round
- Conference: Big East Conference

Ranking
- Coaches: No. 24
- Record: 25–11 (15–5 Big East)
- Head coach: Greg McDermott (15th season)
- Assistant coaches: Ryan Miller (4th season); Derek Kellogg (2nd season); Trey Zeigler (1st season)
- Home arena: CHI Health Center Omaha

2024–25 Big East men's basketball standings
	Conf.				Overall
Team	W		L	PCT	W		L	PCT
No. 11 St. John's †	18	–	2	.900	31	–	5	.861
Creighton	15	–	5	.750	25	–	11	.694
UConn	14	–	6	.700	24	–	11	.686
Xavier	13	–	7	.650	22	–	12	.647
Marquette	13	–	7	.650	23	–	11	.676
Villanova	11	–	9	.550	21	–	15	.583
Georgetown	8	–	12	.400	18	–	16	.529
Providence	6	–	14	.300	12	–	20	.375
Butler	6	–	14	.300	15	–	20	.429
DePaul	4	–	16	.200	14	–	20	.412
Seton Hall	2	–	18	.100	7	–	25	.219
† 2025 Big East tournament winner Rankings from AP Poll

The 2024–25 Creighton Bluejays men's basketball team represented Creighton University in the 2024–25 NCAA Division I men's basketball season. The Bluejays, led by 15th-year head coach Greg McDermott, played their home games at the CHI Health Center Omaha in Omaha, Nebraska as members of the Big East Conference.

The Creighton Bluejays drew an average home attendance of 17,366, the highest of all basketball teams from Nebraska.

== Previous season ==
The Bluejays finished the 2022–23 season 25–10, 14–6 in Big East play to finish in a tie for second place. As the No. 2 seed in the Big East tournament, they lost in the quarterfinals to Providence. They received an at-large bid to the NCAA tournament as the No. 3 seed in the Midwest Region, where they defeated Akron and Oregon to reach the Sweet Sixteen. There they lost to No. 2-seeded Tennessee.

== Offseason ==
=== Departures ===
Name	Number	Pos.	Height	Weight	Year	Hometown	Reason for departure
Jonathan Lawson	2	G	6'6"	188	Sophomore	Memphis, TN	Transferred to Little Rock
Francisco Farabello	5	G	6'3"	180	Senior	Cañada de Gómez, Argentina	Graduated
Brock Vice	10	C	6'10"	238	(redshirt) Freshman	Memphis, TN	Transferred to North Texas
Josiah Dotzler	15	G	6'3"	180	Freshman	Omaha, NE	Transferred to Saint Louis
Trey Alexander	23	G	6'4"	190	Junior	Oklahoma City, OK	Declare for 2024 NBA draft; went undrafted/signed with the Denver Nuggets
Baylor Scheierman	55	G	6'7"	205	Senior	Aurora, NE	Graduated/2024 NBA draft; selected 30th overall by Boston Celtics

=== Incoming transfers ===
Name	Number	Pos.	Height	Weight	Year	Hometown	Previous School
Pop Isaacs	2	G	6'2"	170	Junior	Las Vegas, NV	Texas Tech
Jamiya Neal	5	G/F	6'6"	184	Senior	Toledo, OH	Arizona State

=== 2024 recruiting class ===
College recruiting information
Name	Hometown	School	Height	Weight	Commit date
Jackson McAndrew #5 PF	Plymouth, MN	Wayzata High School	6 ft 9 in (2.06 m)	205 lb (93 kg)	Aug 1, 2023
Jackson McAndrew #5 PF	Recruit ratings: Rivals: 247Sports: ESPN: (88)				
Larry Johnson #17 SG	Santa Clarita, CA	Southern California Academy	6 ft 3 in (1.91 m)	180 lb (82 kg)	Sep 21, 2023
Larry Johnson #17 SG	Recruit ratings: Rivals: 247Sports: ESPN: (84)				
Ty Davis #42 SG	Mountain Brook, AL	Mountain Brook High School	6 ft 5 in (1.96 m)	175 lb (79 kg)	Jun 27, 2023
Ty Davis #42 SG	Recruit ratings: Rivals: 247Sports: ESPN: (79)				
Overall recruit ranking: Rivals: 80
Note: In many cases, Scout, Rivals, 247Sports, On3, and ESPN may conflict in their listings of height and weight.; In these cases, the average was taken. ESPN grades are on a 100-point scale.; Sources: "2024 Team Ranking". Rivals.

== Roster ==
2024–25 Creighton Bluejays men's basketball team
Players
Coaches

Pos.	#	Name	Height	Weight	Year	Previous school	Hometown
F	0	Jasen Green	6 ft 8 in (2.03 m)	230 lb (104 kg)	RS So	Millard North	Omaha, NE
G	1	Steven Ashworth	6 ft 1 in (1.85 m)	170 lb (77 kg)	GS	Lone Peak; Utah State	Alpine, UT
G	2	Pop Isaacs (injured)	6 ft 2 in (1.88 m)	170 lb (77 kg)	Jr	Coronado; Texas Tech	Las Vegas, NV
G	4	Sterling Knox	6 ft 4 in (1.93 m)	200 lb (91 kg)	RS Fr	Red Rocks Academy	Las Vegas, NV
G/F	5	Jamiya Neal	6 ft 6 in (1.98 m)	185 lb (84 kg)	Sr	Phoenix Hillcrest Prep; Arizona State	Toledo, OH
G	6	Larry Johnson	6 ft 4 in (1.93 m)	175 lb (79 kg)	Fr	Southern California Academy	Savannah, GA
G	9	Ty Davis	6 ft 4 in (1.93 m)	165 lb (75 kg)	Fr	Mountain Brook	Mountain Brook, AL
C	11	Ryan Kalkbrenner	7 ft 1 in (2.16 m)	270 lb (122 kg)	GS	Trinity Catholic HS	St. Louis, MO
G	12	Shane Thomas	6 ft 3 in (1.91 m)	200 lb (91 kg)	RS Fr	Red Rocks Academy	Las Vegas, NV
F	13	Mason Miller	6 ft 9 in (2.06 m)	190 lb (86 kg)	RS Jr	Houston HS	Germantown, TN
G	14	Sami Osmani (W)	6 ft 4 in (1.93 m)	205 lb (93 kg)	GS	Oak Lawn Community HS	Oak Lawn, IL
F	23	Jackson McAndrew	6 ft 8 in (2.03 m)	190 lb (86 kg)	Fr	Wayzata	Wayzata, MN
F	32	Josh Townley-Thomas	6 ft 10 in (2.08 m)	220 lb (100 kg)	RS So	Creighton Prep; North Platte CC	Omaha, NE
C	33	Fredrick King	6 ft 10 in (2.08 m)	250 lb (113 kg)	Jr	NBA Academy Latin America	Mangrove Cay, Bahamas
F	41	Isaac Traudt	6 ft 10 in (2.08 m)	235 lb (107 kg)	RS So	Grand Island Senior; Virginia	Grand Island, NE

Head coach

- Greg McDermott (Northern Iowa)

Assistant coach(es)

- Ryan Miller (Northern State)
- Derek Kellogg (UMass)
- Trey Zeigler (TCU)

Legend

- (C) Team captain
- (S) Suspended
- (I) Ineligible
- (W) Walk-on
- Injured
- Current redshirt

Roster

== Schedule and results ==
Date time, TV	Rank^{#}	Opponent^{#}	Result	Record	High points	High rebounds	High assists	Site (attendance) city, state
Exhibition
October 26, 2024*; 7:00 p.m., NPM	No. 15	No. 14 Purdue; United Way of the Midlands; Tornado Disaster Relief Fund	W 93–87	−	24 – Isaacs	6 – Kalkbrenner	8 – Ashworth	CHI Health Center Omaha (15,947); Omaha, NE
Non-conference regular season
November 6, 2024*; 8:00 p.m., FS2	No. 15	UT Rio Grande Valley	W 99–86	1–0	49 – Kalkbrenner	11 – Kalkbrenner	7 – Ashworth	CHI Health Center Omaha (15,969); Omaha, NE
November 10, 2024*; 4:00 p.m., FS1	No. 15	Fairleigh Dickinson	W 96–70	2–0	24 – Kalkbrenner	6 – Kalkbrenner	9 – Ashworth	CHI Health Center Omaha (16,741); Omaha, NE
November 13, 2024*; 8:00 p.m., FS1	No. 14	Houston Christian	W 78–43	3–0	16 – Kalkbrenner	7 – Tied	6 – Ashworth	CHI Health Center Omaha (16,348); Omaha, NE
November 16, 2024*; 6:00 p.m., FS2	No. 14	Kansas City	W 79–56	4–0	15 – McAndrew	12 – Kalkbrenner	6 – Tied	CHI Health Center Omaha (16,951); Omaha, NE
November 22, 2024*; 7:00 p.m., FS1	No. 14	Nebraska; Rivalry	L 63–74	4–1	25 – Isaacs	11 – Kalkbrenner	4 – Tied	CHI Health Center Omaha (18,475); Omaha, NE
November 26, 2024*; 1:00 p.m., TBS	No. 21	vs. San Diego State; Players Era Festival Power Division	L 53–71	4–2	18 – Issacs	14 – McAndrew	5 – Issacs	MGM Grand Garden Arena; Paradise, NV
November 27, 2024*; 5:30 p.m., Max	No. 21	vs. No. 20 Texas A&M; Players Era Festival Power Division	L 73–77	4–3	25 – Isaacs	10 – Kalkbrenner	6 – Tied	MGM Grand Garden Arena; Paradise, NV
November 30, 2024*; 12:00 p.m., TruTV	No. 21	vs. Notre Dame; Players Era Festival 7th place game	W 80–76	5–3	21 – Neal	9 – Neal	6 – Ashworth	MGM Grand Garden Arena; Paradise, NV
December 4, 2024*; 7:30 p.m., FS1		No. 1 Kansas; Big East–Big 12 Battle	W 76–63	6–3	27 – Isaacs	10 – Kalkbrenner	6 – Ashworth	CHI Health Center Omaha (17,908); Omaha, NE
December 7, 2024*; 3:00 p.m., FS1		UNLV	W 83–65	7–3	19 – Neal	9 – Neal	9 – Neal	CHI Health Center Omaha (17,080); Omaha, NE
December 14, 2024*; 7:30 p.m., SECN		at No. 7 Alabama	L 75–83	7–4	20 – Ashworth	8 – Neal	9 – Ashworth	Coleman Coliseum (13,474); Tuscaloosa, AL
Big East regular season
December 18, 2024; 5:30 p.m., CBSSN		at Georgetown	L 57–81	7–5 (0–1)	21 – Ashworth	5 – Green	4 – Tied	Capital One Arena (4,062); Washington, D.C.
December 21, 2024; 3:00 p.m., FS1		Villanova	W 86–79	8–5 (1–1)	23 – Kalkbrenner	6 – Tied	11 – Ashworth	CHI Health Center Omaha (17,125); Omaha, NE
December 31, 2024; 3:00 p.m., Peacock		St. John's	W 57–56	9–5 (2–1)	18 – Ashworth	9 – Tied	7 – Neal	CHI Health Center Omaha (17,466); Omaha, NE
January 3, 2025; 8:00 p.m., FS1		at No. 8 Marquette	L 71–79	9–6 (2–2)	16 – Kalkbrenner	12 – Kalkbrenner	10 – Ashworth	Fiserv Forum (17,756); Milwaukee, WI
January 11, 2025; 11:00 a.m., FOX		at Butler	W 80–76	10–6 (3–2)	26 – Kalkbrenner	12 – Ashworth	9 – Ashworth	Hinkle Fieldhouse (8,134); Indianapolis, IN
January 14, 2025; 7:30 p.m., FS1		Providence	W 84–64	11–6 (4–2)	20 – Tied	10 – Kalkbrenner	6 – Ashworth	CHI Health Center Omaha (17,063); Omaha, NE
January 18, 2025; 11:00 a.m., FOX		at No. 14 UConn	W 68–63	12–6 (5–2)	24 – Neal	10 – Kalkbrenner	9 – Ashworth	Gampel Pavilion (10,299); Storrs, CT
January 21, 2025; 8:00 p.m., FS1		at DePaul	W 73–49	13–6 (6–2)	14 – Neal	8 – Kalkbrenner	4 – Ashworth	Wintrust Arena (3,729); Chicago, IL
January 25, 2025; 12:30 p.m., FS1		Seton Hall	W 79–54	14–6 (7–2)	23 – Kalkbrenner	9 – Kalkbrenner	9 – Ashworth	CHI Health Center Omaha (18,430); Omaha, NE
January 29, 2025; 7:00 p.m., FS1		Xavier	W 86–77	15–6 (8–2)	29 – Kalkbrenner	9 – Kalkbrenner	8 – Ashworth	CHI Health Center Omaha (17,056); Omaha, NE
February 1, 2025; 12:00 p.m., FOX		at Villanova	W 62–60	16–6 (9–2)	22 – Kalkbrenner	9 – Neal	7 – Ashworth	Wells Fargo Center (13,124); Philadelphia, PA
February 5, 2025; 7:30 p.m., FS1		at Providence	W 80–69	17–6 (10–2)	35 – Kalkbrenner	12 – Kalkbrenner	6 – Tied	Amica Mutual Pavilion (11,726); Providence, RI
February 8, 2025; 1:00 p.m., FOX		No. 11 Marquette	W 77–67	18–6 (11–2)	22 – Ashworth	7 – Tied	7 – Ashworth	CHI Health Center Omaha (18,185); Omaha, NE
February 11, 2025; 8:00 p.m., CBSSN	No. 24	UConn	L 66–70	18–7 (11–3)	13 – Tied	9 – Kalkbrenner	7 – Ashworth	CHI Health Center Omaha (18,025); Omaha, NE
February 16, 2025; 2:00 p.m., FS1	No. 24	at No. 9 St. John's	L 73–79	18–8 (11–4)	23 – Ashworth	9 – Kalkbrenner	11 – Ashworth	Madison Square Garden (19,812); New York, NY
February 23, 2025; 3:00 p.m., Peacock		Georgetown	W 80–69	19–8 (12–4)	20 – Ashworth	12 – Neal	9 – Neal	CHI Health Center Omaha (17,545); Omaha, NE
February 26, 2025; 8:00 p.m., Peacock		DePaul	W 75–65	20–8 (13–4)	25 – Kalkbrenner	13 – Kalkbrenner	6 – Ashworth	CHI Health Center Omaha (17,213); Omaha, NE
March 1, 2025; 3:30 p.m., FOX		at Xavier	L 61–83	20–9 (13–5)	23 – Kalkbrenner	12 – Kalkbrenner	5 – Ashworth	Cintas Center (10,674); Cincinnati, OH
March 4, 2025; 6:00 p.m., FS1		at Seton Hall	W 79–61	21–9 (14–5)	20 – Kalkbrenner	9 – Kalkbrenner	8 – Ashworth	Prudential Center (8,498); Newark, NJ
March 8, 2025; 5:00 p.m., FS1		Butler	W 87–74	22–9 (15–5)	27 – Kalkbrenner	15 – Kalkbrenner	11 – Ashworth	CHI Health Center Omaha (17,907); Omaha, NE
Big East tournament
March 13, 2025; 6:00 p.m., FS1	(2)	vs. (10) DePaul; Quarterfinal	W 85–81 ^{2OT}	23–9	32 – Kalkbrenner	9 – Kalkbrenner	5 – Tied	Madison Square Garden (19,812); New York, NY
March 14, 2025; 8:30 p.m., FOX	(2)	vs. (3) UConn; Semifinal	W 71–62	24–9	19 – Tied	5 – Tied	3 – Tied	Madison Square Garden (19,812); New York, NY
March 15, 2025; 5:38 p.m., FOX	(2)	vs. (1) No. 6 St. John's; Final	L 66–82	24–10	15 – Kalkbrenner	7 – Tied	7 – Ashworth	Madison Square Garden (19,812); New York, NY
NCAA tournament
March 20, 2025; 11:15 a.m., CBS	(9 S)	vs. (8 S) No. 10 Louisville; First Round	W 89–75	25–10	29 – Neal	12 – Neal	5 – Neal	Rupp Arena (18,769); Lexington, KY
March 22, 2025; 6:10 p.m., TBS	(9 S)	vs. (1 S) No. 4 Auburn; Second Round	L 70–82	25–11	18 – Kalkbrenner	7 – Kalkbrenner	8 – Ashworth	Rupp Arena (17,484); Lexington, KY
*Non-conference game. ^{#}Rankings from AP Poll. (#) Tournament seedings in parentheses. S=South. All times are in Central Time.

== Rankings ==
Ranking movements Legend: ██ Increase in ranking ██ Decrease in ranking — = Not ranked RV = Received votes
	Week																				
Poll	Pre	1	2	3	4	5	6	7	8	9	10	11	12	13	14	15	16	17	18	19	Final
AP	15	14	14	21	RV	RV	RV	—	—	—	—	RV	RV	RV	24	RV	RV	RV	RV	RV	RV
Coaches	14	13	13	19	RV	RV	RV	—	—	—	—	RV	RV	RV	21	RV	25	RV	RV	RV	24
