= Acaden Lewis =

American basketball player (born 2005)

No. 55 – Miami Hurricanes
- Position: Point guard
- Conference: Atlantic Coast Conference

Personal information
- Born: October 11, 2005 (age 21)
- Listed height: 6 ft 2 in (1.88 m)
- Listed weight: 180 lb (82 kg)

Career information
- High school: Sidwell Friends School (Washington, D.C.)
- College: Villanova (2025–2026); Miami (Florida) (2026–present)

Career highlights
- Second-team All-Big East (2026); Big East All-Freshman Team (2026)

Acaden Lewis (born October 11, 2005) is an American college basketball player for the Miami Hurricanes of the Atlantic Coast Conference (ACC). He previously played for the Villanova Wildcats.

== Early life and high school ==
Acaden Lewis was raised in the Trinidad neighborhood of Washington, D.C. and grew up playing basketball and training at his local rec center named after his neighborhood. After graduating from Alice Deal middle school, he began high school at St. John's College High School in Washington, D.C and played basketball for the school team there. After losing the state semifinal game during his Sophomore year against Sidwell Friends School, he reclassified from the 2024 class into the 2025 class and transferred to the latter school. As a junior at Sidwell Friends School, he was named the D.C. Gatorade Player of the Year. Lewis also played with Team Durant on the Nike EYBL circuit, where he averaged 16.7 points, 4.9 rebounds, and 6.1 assists per game. He initially committed to play college basketball for Kentucky in November 2024 over offers from Duke and UConn. However, after de-committing from the Wildcats, Lewis signed to play for the Villanova Wildcats in May 2025.

== College career ==
Lewis entered his freshman season as starter for the Wildcats. In the team's exhibition match on October 20, 2025, he scored 15 points and racked up three assists against VCU. On November 3, 2025, he made his collegiate debut, recording five points, two rebounds, and three assists in a loss to BYU. On November 8, Lewis dropped 21 points, four rebounds, and four assists in a win over Queens. On December 1, he totaled 12 points, five rebounds, and eight assists in a victory against Temple. On December 23, Lewis notched 16 points in a victory over Seton Hall. On January 10, 2026, he recorded 20 points and eight assists in a victory over Marquette. On April 8, 2026, Lewis announced that he will be entering the 2026 NBA Draft while maintaining his college eligibility and entering the transfer portal. On April 14, 2026, Lewis announced his decision to transfer to University of Miami to play for the Miami Hurricanes. Despite his commitment to Miami, he still has his name in the NBA draft waters.
