= Matt Hodge =

Belgian basketball player (born 2004)

No. 3 – Villanova Wildcats
- Position: Power forward
- League: Big East Conference

Personal information
- Born: November 18, 2004 (age 21)
- Listed height: 6 ft 8 in (2.03 m)
- Listed weight: 220 lb (100 kg)

Career information
- High school: St. Rose (Belmar, New Jersey)
- College: Villanova (2024–present)

Matthew Dean Hodge (born November 18, 2004) is a Belgian college basketball player for the Villanova Wildcats of the Big East Conference.

== Early life and high school ==
Hodge is originally from Belgium, and moved to the U.S. in 2022 to attend St. Rose High School in Belmar, New Jersey. He helped lead St. Rose to its first NJSIAA sectional title in 19 years during his junior season and averaged 14.8 points, 8.9 rebounds, 3.4 assists and 1.3 blocks per game. As a senior, he averaged 17.0 points and 6.7 rebounds per game. Hodge was a consensus four-star recruit and was ranked within the top 100 players of his class by ESPN and 247sports. Coming out of high school, Hodge committed to play college basketball for the Villanova Wildcats over offers from other schools such as Maryland, Marquette, Seton Hall, Xavier, and Penn State.

== College career ==
Heading into his freshman season in 2024–25, Hodge was ruled academically ineligible by the NCAA. After an appeal by Villanova to the NCAA, he was ultimately ruled ineligible for the entirety of the 2024–25 season. As a result, Hodge was redshirted. He decided to return to the Wildcats for his redshirt freshman season in 2025–26. On November 19, 2025, Hodge scored 17 points in a victory over La Salle. On November 25, he recorded 12 points and seven rebounds in a victory over Old Dominion. Hodge suffered a torn ACL in a loss against St. John's on February 28, 2026, ending his season. He made 29 starts as a redshirt freshman and averaged 9.2 points and 3.6 rebounds per game.

== Personal life ==
Hodge is the son of former professional basketball player, Odell Hodge. His younger brother Jayden is committed to play basketball at Northwestern.
