= Josh Dix =

American basketball player (born 2004)

No. 21 – Oklahoma City Thunder
- Position: Shooting guard
- League: NBA

Personal information
- Born: June 29, 2004 (age 22) Council Bluffs, Iowa, U.S.
- Listed height: 6 ft 5 in (1.96 m)
- Listed weight: 210 lb (95 kg)

Career information
- High school: Abraham Lincoln (Council Bluffs, Iowa)
- College: Iowa (2022–2025); Creighton (2025–2026)
- NBA draft: 2026: undrafted
- Playing career: 2026–present

Career history
- 2026–present: Oklahoma City Thunder
- 2026–present: →Oklahoma City Blue
- Stats at NBA.com
- Stats at Basketball Reference

Joshua Dix (born June 29, 2004) is an American basketball player for the Oklahoma City Thunder of the National Basketball Association (NBA), on a two-way contract with the Oklahoma City Blue of the NBA G League. He played college basketball for the Iowa Hawkeyes and Creighton Bluejays.

== Early life and high school ==
Dix attended Abraham Lincoln High School in Council Bluffs, Iowa. As a senior, he averaged 20.4 points and 7.6 rebounds per game season before suffering a season-ending broken tibia and fibula in his right leg. Coming out of high school, Dix was rated as a three-star recruit and committed to play college basketball for the Iowa Hawkeyes over other schools such as Drake, Wisconsin, Wake Forest, Minnesota, Northern Iowa, and Purdue.

== College career ==
=== Iowa ===
As a freshman in 2022–23, Dix averaged just 2.0 points per game. On January 15, 2024, he recorded 21 points, five assists, and two steals in a win over Minnesota. Dix finished the 2023–24 season averaging 8.9 points, 2.2 rebounds, and 1.7 assists per game, earning All-Big Ten Conference honorable mention. On December 3, 2024, he notched 22 points, including the game-winning three from 30 feet versus Northwestern. On February 4, 2025, Dix dropped 27 points in a loss against Purdue. On March 6, he notched 18 points and seven rebounds versus Michigan State. During the 2024–25 season, Dix made 32 starts, where he averaged 14.4 points, 3.2 rebounds, 2.8 assists, and 0.9 steals per game. After the season, he entered his name into the NCAA transfer portal.

=== Creighton ===
On April 4, 2025, Dix announced his commitment to Creighton. In his final season with Creighton, Dix averaged 13.2 points, 3.7 rebounds, and 2.3 assists.

== Professional career ==
After going undrafted in the 2026 NBA draft, Dix signed a two-way contract with the Oklahoma City Thunder.
