= Jackson McAndrew =

American basketball player

No. 23 – Creighton Bluejays
- Position: Power forward
- League: Big East Conference

Personal information
- Listed height: 6 ft 10 in (2.08 m)
- Listed weight: 225 lb (102 kg)

Career information
- High school: Wayzata (Plymouth, Minnesota)
- College: Creighton (2024–present)

Career highlights
- Big East All-Freshman team (2025); Minnesota Mr. Basketball (2024)

Jackson McAndrew is an American college basketball player for the Creighton Bluejays of the Big East Conference.

== Early life and high school ==
McAndrew grew up in Wayzata, Minnesota and attended Wayzata High School. He averaged 17 points and eight rebounds per game during his junior season as Wayzata won the state championship. McAndrew averaged 23.7 points and 10.1 rebounds per game as a senior and was named Minnesota Mr. Basketball. McAndrew was rated a four-star recruit and committed to play college basketball at Creighton over offers from Notre Dame, Wisconsin, and Xavier.

== College career ==
McAndrew became a starter for the Creighton Blujays early in his freshman season. He started 31 of the Bluejays' 36 games and averaged 7.8 points and 4.4 rebounds per game and was named to the Big East Conference All-Freshman team. McAndrew set a school record for freshmen with 69 three-point field goals made.

== Personal life ==
McAndrews's father, Steve, played college basketball at North Dakota.
