= 2024–25 Seton Hall Pirates men's basketball team =

American college basketball season

2024–25 Seton Hall Pirates men's basketball
- Conference: Big East Conference
- Record: 7–25 (2–18 Big East)
- Head coach: Shaheen Holloway (3rd season)
- Assistant coaches: Rasheen Davis; Ryan Whalen; Corey Lowery; Andrew Francis
- Home arena: Prudential Center; Walsh Gymnasium

2024–25 Big East men's basketball standings
	Conf.				Overall
Team	W		L	PCT	W		L	PCT
No. 11 St. John's †	18	–	2	.900	31	–	5	.861
Creighton	15	–	5	.750	25	–	11	.694
UConn	14	–	6	.700	24	–	11	.686
Xavier	13	–	7	.650	22	–	12	.647
Marquette	13	–	7	.650	23	–	11	.676
Villanova	11	–	9	.550	21	–	15	.583
Georgetown	8	–	12	.400	18	–	16	.529
Providence	6	–	14	.300	12	–	20	.375
Butler	6	–	14	.300	15	–	20	.429
DePaul	4	–	16	.200	14	–	20	.412
Seton Hall	2	–	18	.100	7	–	25	.219
† 2025 Big East tournament winner Rankings from AP Poll

The 2024–25 Seton Hall Pirates men's basketball team represented Seton Hall University in the 2024–25 NCAA Division I men's basketball season. They were led by third-year head coach Shaheen Holloway. The Pirates played their home games at the Prudential Center in Newark, New Jersey, and Walsh Gymnasium in South Orange, New Jersey, as members of the Big East Conference.

== Previous season ==
The Pirates finished the 2023–24 season 25–12, 13–7 in Big East play to finish in a fourth place. They were defeated by St. John's in the first round of the Big East tournament. The Pirates received an at-large bid to the National Invitation Tournament (NIT), where they won the tournament, beating Indiana State in the finals.

== Offseason ==
=== Departures ===
Name	Number	Pos.	Height	Weight	Year	Hometown	Reason for departure
Kadary Richmond	1	F	6'6"	205	Senior	Brooklyn, NY	Graduate transferred to St. John's
Al-Amir Dawes	2	G	6'2"	185	Senior	Newark, NJ	Graduated
Elijah Hutchins-Everett	4	C	6'11"	225	Junior	Orange, NJ	Transferred to James Madison
Sadraque NgaNga	7	F	6'10"	218	Sophomore	Luanda, Angola	Transferred to San Jose State
Arda Özdoğan	9	C	6'10"	231	Freshman	Ankara, Turkey	Signed with Türk Telekom B.K.
Jaquan Sanders	13	G	6'4"	205	Sophomore	Queens, NY	Transferred to Hofstra
Dre Davis	14	G/F	6'6"	210	Senior	Indianapolis, IN	Transferred to Ole Miss
Jaden Bediako	14	C	6'10"	240	Graduate	Ontario, Canada	Graduated
Malachi Brown	22	F	6'1"	165	Freshman	Buford, GA	Transferred to Georgia State
JaQuan Harris	23	G	6'3"	185	Sophomore	North Brunswick, NJ	Transferred to Frank Phillips College

=== Incoming transfers ===
Name	Number	Pos.	Height	Weight	Year	Hometown	Previous School
Zion Harmon	1	G	6'0"	184	Junior	Temple Hills, MD	Bethune–Cookman
Chaunce Jenkins	2	G	6'4"	185	Graduate	Newport News, VA	Old Dominion
Prince Aligbe	4	F	6'7"	227	Junior	Minneapolis, MN	Boston College
Scotty Middleton	7	F	6'7"	181	Sophomore	Miami, FL	Ohio State
Yacine Toumi	9	F	6'10"	215	Graduate	Meudon, France	Evansville
Gus Yalden	19	F	6'9"	258	Sophomore	Appleton, WI	Wisconsin
Emmanuel Okorafor	23	C	6'9"	225	Junior	Abia, Nigeria	Louisville
Garwey Dual	33	G	6'5"	205	Sophomore	Houston, TX	Providence

==== 2024 recruiting class ====
College recruiting
Name	Hometown	School	Height	Weight	Commit date
Jahseem Felton #0 SG	Charlotte, NC	Combine Academy	6 ft 5 in (1.96 m)	175 lb (79 kg)	Oct 19, 2023
Jahseem Felton #0 SG	Recruit ratings: Scout: Rivals: 247Sports: ESPN: (79)				
Godswill Erheriene #35 C	Glen Head, NY	Long Island Lutheran	6 ft 9 in (2.06 m)	225 lb (102 kg)	Nov 9, 2023
Godswill Erheriene #35 C	Recruit ratings: Scout: Rivals: 247Sports: ESPN: (80)				

== Roster ==
2024–25 Seton Hall Pirates men's basketball team
Players
Coaches

Pos.	#	Name	Height	Weight	Year	Previous school	Hometown
G	0	Dylan Addae-Wusu	6 ft 4 in (1.93 m)	237 lb (108 kg)	GS	St. John's	The Bronx, New York
G	1	Zion Harmon	6 ft 0 in (1.83 m)	184 lb (83 kg)	Jr	Bethune–Cookman	Temple Hills, Maryland
G	2	Chaunce Jenkins	6 ft 4 in (1.93 m)	185 lb (84 kg)	GS	Old Dominion	Newport News, Virginia
F	4	Prince Aligbe	6 ft 7 in (2.01 m)	228 lb (103 kg)	Jr	Boston College	Minneapolis, Minnesota
F	6	David Tubek	6 ft 7 in (2.01 m)	220 lb (100 kg)	So	Dream City Christian School (AZ)	Juba, South Sudan
F	7	Scotty Middleton	6 ft 7 in (2.01 m)	181 lb (82 kg)	So	Ohio State	Miami, Florida
F	9	Yacine Toumi	6 ft 10 in (2.08 m)	215 lb (98 kg)	GS	Evansville	Meudon, France
G	15	Jasheem Felton	6 ft 5 in (1.96 m)	195 lb (88 kg)	Fr	Combine Academy (NC)	Charlotte, North Carolina
G	18	John David Thomas	6 ft 4 in (1.93 m)	188 lb (85 kg)	So	IMG Academy	Tallahassee, Florida
F	19	Gus Yalden	6 ft 9 in (2.06 m)	258 lb (117 kg)	So	Wisconsin	Appleton, Wisconsin
G	21	Isaiah Coleman	6 ft 5 in (1.96 m)	191 lb (87 kg)	So	Word of God Christian Academy	Fredericksburg, Virginia
F	23	Emmanuel Okorafor	6 ft 9 in (2.06 m)	225 lb (102 kg)	Jr	Louisville	Abia, Nigeria
G	33	Garwey Dual	6 ft 5 in (1.96 m)	205 lb (93 kg)	So	Providence	Houston, Texas
C	35	Assane Mbaye	7 ft 2 in (2.18 m)	190 lb (86 kg)	Fr	The Patrick School (NJ)	Canary Islands, Spain
G	41	David Gabriel (W)	6 ft 1 in (1.85 m)	167 lb (76 kg)	Jr	North Bergen High School	North Bergen, New Jersey
C	54	Godswill Erheriene	6 ft 9 in (2.06 m)	214 lb (97 kg)	Fr	Long Island Lutheran (NY)	Ughelli, Nigeria

Head coach

- Shaheen Holloway (Seton Hall)

Assistant coach(es)

- Rasheen Davis (New Rochelle)
- Ryan Whalen (Saint Joseph's)
- Corey Lowery (Rutgers)
- Andrew Francis (Southampton)

Legend

- (C) Team captain
- (S) Suspended
- (I) Ineligible
- (W) Walk-on
- Injured
- Current redshirt

Roster

== Schedule and results ==
Date time, TV	Rank^{#}	Opponent^{#}	Result	Record	High points	High rebounds	High assists	Site (attendance) city, state
Non-conference regular season
November 4, 2024*; 7:30 p.m., FS1		Saint Peter's	W 57–53	1–0	19 – Jenkins	6 – Tied	5 – Dual	Prudential Center (8,072); Newark, NJ
November 9, 2024*; 12:00 p.m., FS2		Fordham	L 56–57	1–1	12 – Toumi	7 – Aligbe	5 – Addae-Wusu	Walsh Gymnasium (1,286); South Orange, NJ
November 13, 2024*; 8:00 p.m., MSGSN		vs. Hofstra; Icons of the Game	L 48–49	1–2	18 – Jenkins	8 – Addae-Wusu	4 – Addae-Wusu	Nassau Coliseum (1,400); Uniondale, NY
November 16, 2024; 12:00 p.m., FS2		Wagner	W 54–28	2–2	16 – Jenkins	7 – Toumi	4 – Addae-Wusu	Walsh Gymnasium (1,219); South Orange, NJ
November 21, 2024; 5:00 p.m., ESPN2		vs. VCU; Charleston Classic quarterfinals	W 69–66 ^{OT}	3–2	22 – Jenkins	10 – Coleman	4 – Dual	TD Arena; Charleston, SC
November 22, 2024; 5:00 p.m., ESPN2		vs. Vanderbilt; Charleston Classic semifinals	L 60–76	3–3	20 – Coleman	9 – Jenkins	3 – Addae-Wusu	TD Arena; Charleston, SC
November 24, 2024; 6:00 p.m., ESPN2		vs. Florida Atlantic; Charleston Classic 3rd place game	W 63–61	4–3	15 – Jenkins	7 – Coleman	2 – Coleman	TD Arena; Charleston, SC
November 30, 2024; 12:00 p.m., FS2		Monmouth	L 51–63	4–4	20 – Coleman	6 – Okorafor	3 – Dual	Prudential Center (8,606); Newark, NJ
December 4, 2024; 8:30 p.m., CBSSN		NJIT	W 67–56	5–4	19 – Aligbe	8 – Aligbe	4 – Coleman	Prudential Center (8,099); Newark, NJ
December 8, 2024; 12:00 p.m., FS1		Oklahoma State; Big East–Big 12 Battle	L 76–85	5–5	18 – Coleman	4 – Tubek	9 – Dual	Prudential Center (8,791); Newark, NJ
December 14, 2024; 3:00 p.m., FOX		at Rutgers; Garden State Hardwood Classic	L 63–66	5–6	15 – Coleman	10 – Okorafor	5 – Dual	Jersey Mike's Arena (8,000); Piscataway, NJ
Big East regular season
December 17, 2024; 7:30 p.m., Peacock		at Villanova	L 67–79	5–7 (0–1)	22 – Coleman	9 – Coleman	3 – Middleton	Wells Fargo Center (6,501); Philadelphia, PA
December 22, 2024; 7:00 p.m., FS1		Georgetown	L 60–61	5–8 (0–2)	25 – Coleman	9 – Coleman	3 – Addae-Wusu	Prudential Center (8,879); Newark, NJ
December 31, 2024; 2:00 p.m., Peacock		at Xavier	L 72–94	5–9 (0–3)	19 – Coleman	5 – Coleman	4 – Jenkins	Cintas Center (10,212); Cincinnati, OH
January 8, 2025; 6:30 p.m., Peacock		DePaul	W 85–80 ^{OT}	6–9 (1–3)	24 – Tied	6 – Tied	7 – Addae-Wusu	Prudential Center (8,257); Newark, NJ
January 11, 2025; 5:00 p.m., CBSSN		at Providence	L 85–91	6–10 (1–4)	26 – Coleman	7 – Aligbe	4 – Middleton	Amica Mutual Pavilion (12,193); Providence, RI
January 15, 2025; 7:00 p.m., FS1		at Butler	L 77–82	6–11 (1–5)	21 – Jenkins	7 – Toumi	4 – Jenkins	Hinkle Fieldhouse (6,607); Indianapolis, IN
January 18, 2025; 8:00 p.m., FS1		St. John's	L 51–79	6–12 (1–6)	11 – Coleman	7 – Erheriene	3 – Dual	Prudential Center (9,652); Newark, NJ
January 21, 2025; 8:00 p.m., Peacock		No. 10 Marquette	L 59–76	6–13 (1–7)	27 – Coleman	9 – Coleman	3 – Tied	Prudential Center (8,152); Newark, NJ
January 25, 2025; 1:30 p.m., FS1		at Creighton	L 54–79	6–14 (1–8)	12 – Aligbe	4 – Tied	5 – Dual	CHI Health Center Omaha (18,430); Omaha, NE
January 28, 2025; 7:00 p.m., Peacock		Providence	L 67–69	6–15 (1–9)	19 – Aligbe	4 – Tied	4 – Dual	Prudential Center (8,422); Newark, NJ
February 2, 2025; 6:00 p.m., FS1		at DePaul	L 57–74	6–16 (1–10)	18 – Coleman	6 – Tubek	5 – Dual	Wintrust Arena (5,003); Chicago, IL
February 5, 2025; 6:30 p.m., FS1		Butler	L 54–84	6–17 (1–11)	17 – Aligbe	6 – Tied	6 – Dual	Prudential Center (8,634); Newark, NJ
February 8, 2025; 12:00 p.m., FS1		at Georgetown	L 46–60	6–18 (1–12)	21 – Coleman	10 – Coleman	6 – Dual	Capital One Arena (9,261); Washington, D.C.
February 15, 2025; 2:30 p.m., FOX		UConn	W 69–68 ^{OT}	7–18 (2–12)	23 – Coleman	10 – Erheriene	3 – Dual	Prudential Center (10,222); Newark, NJ
February 18, 2025; 9:00 p.m., CBSSN		at No. 16 Marquette	L 56–80	7–19 (2–13)	13 – Coleman	4 – Tied	4 – Dual	Fiserv Forum (14,948); Milwaukee, WI
February 23, 2025; 2:00 p.m., FS1		Xavier	L 66–73	7–20 (2–14)	24 – Coleman	6 – Tied	3 – Tied	Prudential Center (9,337); Newark, NJ
February 26, 2025; 8:30 p.m., FS1		Villanova	L 54–59	7–21 (2–15)	18 – Addae-Wusu	9 – Aligbe	6 – Addae-Wusu	Prudential Center (8,697); Newark, NJ
March 1, 2025; 2:15 p.m., CBS		at No. 7 St. John's	L 61–71	7–22 (2–16)	18 – Addae-Wusu	6 – Coleman	7 – Addae-Wusu	Madison Square Garden (19,812); New York, NY
March 4, 2025; 7:00 p.m., FS1		Creighton	L 61–79	7–23 (2–17)	18 – Coleman	7 – Coleman	4 – Addae-Wusu	Prudential Center (8,498); Newark, NJ
March 8, 2025; 2:30 p.m., FOX		at UConn	L 50–81	7–24 (2–18)	15 – Aligbe	3 – Tied	4 – Dual	Harry A. Gampel Pavilion (10,299); Storrs, CT
Big East tournament
March 12, 2025; 9:00 p.m., Peacock	(11)	vs. (6) Villanova; First round	L 55–67	7–25	25 – Coleman	7 – Addae-Wusu	5 – Dual	Madison Square Garden (19,812); New York, NY
*Non-conference game. ^{#}Rankings from AP Poll. (#) Tournament seedings in parentheses. All times are in Eastern Time.
