= 2025 Big East men's basketball tournament =

U.S. collegiate basketball event

- Classification: Division I
- Season: 2024–25
- Teams: 11
- Site: Madison Square Garden; New York City
- Champions: St. John's (4th title)
- Winning coach: Rick Pitino (4th title)
- MVP: RJ Luis Jr. (St. John's)
- Television: Peacock, FS1, Fox

2024–25 Big East men's basketball standings
	Conf.				Overall
Team	W		L	PCT	W		L	PCT
No. 11 St. John's †	18	–	2	.900	31	–	5	.861
Creighton	15	–	5	.750	25	–	11	.694
UConn	14	–	6	.700	24	–	11	.686
Xavier	13	–	7	.650	22	–	12	.647
Marquette	13	–	7	.650	23	–	11	.676
Villanova	11	–	9	.550	21	–	15	.583
Georgetown	8	–	12	.400	18	–	16	.529
Providence	6	–	14	.300	12	–	20	.375
Butler	6	–	14	.300	15	–	20	.429
DePaul	4	–	16	.200	14	–	20	.412
Seton Hall	2	–	18	.100	7	–	25	.219
† 2025 Big East tournament winner Rankings from AP Poll

The 2025 Big East Men's Basketball Tournament was the postseason men's basketball tournament for the Big East Conference held March 12–15, 2025, at Madison Square Garden in New York City. The winner, St. John's, received the conference's automatic bid to the 2025 NCAA Tournament.

The double-overtime quarterfinal game between DePaul and Creighton on March 13 was the first multi-overtime game in the Big East tournament since the foundation of the new Big East Conference in the offseason of 2013. It also was the first in the tournament since a double-overtime game in 2012, when the tournament belonged to the original Big East Conference of 1979–2013.

== Seeds ==
All 11 Big East schools participated in the tournament. Teams were seeded by conference record with tie-breaking procedures to determine the seeds for teams with identical conference records. The top five teams received first-round byes. Seeding for the tournament was determined at the close of the regular conference season.

Seed	School	Conference	Tiebreaker
1	St. John's	18–2	
2	Creighton	15–5	
3	UConn	14–6	
4	Xavier	13–7	1–1 vs. UConn
5	Marquette	13–7	0–2 vs. UConn
6	Villanova	11–9	
7	Georgetown	8–12	
8	Providence	6–14	1–1 vs. Villanova
9	Butler	6–14	0–2 vs. Villanova
10	DePaul	4–16	
11	Seton Hall	2–18	

== Schedule ==
Game	Time	Matchup	Score	Television	Attendance
First round – Wednesday, March 12
1	4:00 pm	No. 8 Providence vs. No. 9 Butler	69–75	Peacock	19,812
2	6:30 pm	No. 7 Georgetown vs. No. 10 DePaul	67–71	Peacock	19,812
3	9:00 pm	No. 6 Villanova vs. No. 11 Seton Hall	67–55	Peacock	19,812
Quarterfinals – Thursday, March 13
4	12:00 pm	No. 1 St. John's vs. No. 9 Butler	78–57	Peacock	19,812
5	2:30 pm	No. 4 Xavier vs. No. 5 Marquette	87–89	Peacock	19,812
6	7:00 pm	No. 2 Creighton vs. No. 10 DePaul	85–81 ^{2OT}	FS1	19,812
7	10:18 pm	No. 3 UConn vs. No. 6 Villanova	73–56	FS1	19,812
Semifinals – Friday, March 14
8	6:40 pm	No. 1 St. John's vs. No. 5 Marquette	79–63	Fox	19,812
9	9:30 pm	No. 2 Creighton vs. No. 3 UConn	71–62	Fox	19,812
Championship – Saturday, March 15
10	6:30 pm	No. 1 St. John's vs. No. 2 Creighton	82–66	Fox	19,812
Game times in EDT. Rankings denote tournament seed.

== Bracket ==
First round Wednesday, March 12; Peacock
8	Providence	69
9	Butler	75
7	Georgetown	67
10	DePaul	71
6	Villanova	67
11	Seton Hall	55

Quarterfinals; Thursday, March 13; Peacock/FS1
1	6 St. John's	78
9	Butler	57
4	Xavier	87
5	25 Marquette	89
2	Creighton	85^{2OT}
10	DePaul	81
3	UConn	73
6	Villanova	56

Semifinals; Friday, March 14; FOX
1	6 St. John's	79
5	25 Marquette	63
2	Creighton	71
3	UConn	62

Championship; Saturday, March 15; FOX
1	6 St. John's	82
2	Creighton	66

== Awards and honors ==
=== All-Tournament Team ===
Name	Pos.	Height	Weight	Year	Team
Zuby Ejiofor	F	6'9"	240	Jr.	St. John's
Kadary Richmond	G	6'6"	205	GS.	St. John's
Ryan Kalkbrenner	C	7'1"	270	GS.	Creighton
Kam Jones	G	6'5"	200	Sr.	Marquette
Ryan Conwell	G	6'3"	210	Jr.	Xavier

=== Dave Gavitt Trophy (Most Outstanding Player) ===
Name	Pos.	Height	Weight	Year	Team
RJ Luis Jr.	G/F	6'7"	215	Jr.	St. John's

== Game summaries ==
=== First round ===
Peacock

March 12
4:00 pm

Box Score

No. 8 Providence 69, No. 9 Butler 75
Scoring by half: 31–39, 38–36
Pts: Joseph 20; Rebs: Erhunmwunse 11; Asts: Pierre 5	Pts: Brooks II 25; Rebs: Brooks II 7 Asts: Tied 3

Madison Square Garden, New York City
Referees: Pat Driscoll, Nathan Farrell, Evon Burroughs

Peacock

March 12
6:30 pm

Box Score

No. 7 Georgetown 67, No. 10 DePaul 71
Scoring by half: 40–38, 27–33
Pts: Peavy 26; Rebs: Fielder 11; Asts: Fielder 4	Pts: Blocker 16; Rebs: Tied 6 Asts: Blocker 6

Madison Square Garden, New York City
Referees: Jeff Clark, James Breeding, Greg Evans

Peacock

March 12
9:00 pm

Box score

No. 6 Villanova 67, No. 11 Seton Hall 55
Scoring by half: 35–17, 32–38
Pts: Dixon 19; Rebs: Poplar 10; Asts: Tied 3	Pts: Coleman 25; Rebs: Addae-Wusu 7 Asts: Dual 5

Madison Square Garden, New York City
Attendance: 19,812
Referees: Mike Roberts, Tim Clougherty, Michael Palau

=== Quarterfinals ===
Peacock

March 13
12:00 pm

Box score

No. 1 St. John's 78, No. 9 Butler 57
Scoring by half: 37–26, 41–31
Pts: Luis Jr. 20; Rebs: Richmond 8 Asts: Richmond 9	Pts: McCaffery 16; Rebs: Kapke 6 Asts: Telfort 3

Madison Square Garden, New York City
Referees: Brian O'Connell, Matt Potter, Greg Evans

Peacock

March 13
2:30 pm

Box score

No. 4 Xavier 87, No. 5 Marquette 89
Scoring by half: 46–36, 41–53
Pts: Conwell 38; Rebs: Tied 7 Asts: Freemantle 5	Pts: Jones 28; Rebs: Tied 6 Asts: Jones 5

Madison Square Garden, New York City
Referees: Lamar Simpson, James Breeding, Tony Chiazza

FS1

March 13
7:00 pm

Box score

No. 2 Creighton 85, No. 10 DePaul 81 (2OT)
Scoring by half: 21–36, 41–26 Overtime: 11–11, 12–8
Pts: Kalkbrenner 32; Rebs: Kalkbrenner 9 Asts: Tied 5	Pts: Blocker 25; Rebs: Rivera 9 Asts: Tied 4

Madison Square Garden, New York City
Referees: Pat Driscoll, Jeff Clark, Brent Hampton

FS1

March 13
10:18 pm

Box score

No. 3 UConn 73, No. 6 Villanova 56
Scoring by half: 31–36, 42–20
Pts: Karaban 18; Rebs: Karaban 9 Asts: Karaban 6	Pts: Poplar 25; Rebs: Perkins 6 Asts: Brickus 2

Madison Square Garden, New York City
Referees: Tim Clougherty, John Gaffney, Nathan Farrell

=== Semifinals ===
Fox

March 14
6:40 pm

Box score

No. 1 St. John's 79, No. 5 Marquette 63
Scoring by half: 35–37, 44–26
Pts: Ejiofor 33; Rebs: Richmond 10; Asts: Richmond 6	Pts: Jones 24; Rebs: Joplin 9 Asts: Tied 2

Madison Square Garden, New York City
Referees: Pat Driscoll, Mike Roberts, Brent Hampton

Fox

March 14
9:30 pm

Box score

No. 2 Creighton 71, No. 3 UConn 62
Scoring by half: 46–35, 25–27
Pts: Tied 19; Rebs: Tied 5 Asts: Tied 3	Pts: Tied 13; Rebs: Reed Jr. 8 Asts: Tied 2

Madison Square Garden, New York City
Attendance: 19,812

=== Finals ===
Fox

March 15
6:30 pm

Box score

No. 1 St. John's 82, No. 2 Creighton 66
Scoring by half: 25–28, 57–38
Pts: Luis Jr. 29; Rebs: Richmond 12; Asts: Tied 4	Pts: Kalkbrenner 15; Rebs: Tied 7 Asts: Ashworth 7

Madison Square Garden, New York City
Referees: James Breeding, Tony Chiazza, Matt Potter
