= 2024–25 Providence Friars men's basketball team =

American college basketball season

2024–25 Providence Friars men's basketball
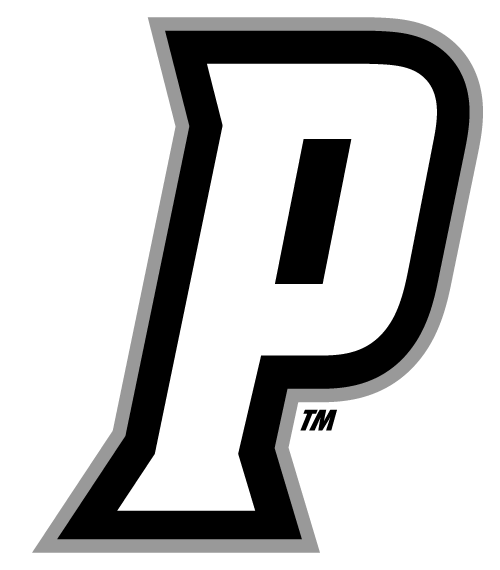
- Conference: Big East Conference
- Record: 12–20 (6–14 Big East)
- Head coach: Kim English (2nd season)
- Assistant coaches: Dennis Felton (2nd season); Nate Tomlinson (2nd season); Tim Fuller (2nd season); Matt Palumbo (1st season)
- Home arena: Amica Mutual Pavilion

2024–25 Big East men's basketball standings
	Conf.				Overall
Team	W		L	PCT	W		L	PCT
No. 11 St. John's †	18	–	2	.900	31	–	5	.861
Creighton	15	–	5	.750	25	–	11	.694
UConn	14	–	6	.700	24	–	11	.686
Xavier	13	–	7	.650	22	–	12	.647
Marquette	13	–	7	.650	23	–	11	.676
Villanova	11	–	9	.550	21	–	15	.583
Georgetown	8	–	12	.400	18	–	16	.529
Providence	6	–	14	.300	12	–	20	.375
Butler	6	–	14	.300	15	–	20	.429
DePaul	4	–	16	.200	14	–	20	.412
Seton Hall	2	–	18	.100	7	–	25	.219
† 2025 Big East tournament winner Rankings from AP Poll

The 2024–25 Providence Friars men's basketball team represented Providence College during the 2024–25 NCAA Division I men's basketball season. The team was led by second-year head coach Kim English, and played their home games at Amica Mutual Pavilion in Providence, Rhode Island as a member of the Big East Conference. This was the Friars' worst season since the 1984-85 season.

== Previous season ==
The Friars finished the 2023–24 season 21–14, 10–10 in Big East play to finish in a tie for sixth place. As a No. 7 seed in the Big East tournament, they defeated Georgetown in the first round and Creighton in the quarterfinals, before losing to Marquette in the semifinals. They received an automatic bid to the National Invitation Tournament as the No. 4 seed in the Seton Hall bracket, where they lost in the first round to Boston College.

== Offseason ==
=== Departures ===
Name	Number	Pos.	Height	Weight	Year	Hometown	Reason for departure
Davonte Gaines	0	G	6'7"	190	GS senior	Buffalo, NY	Graduated
Donvoan Santoro	2	F	6'8"	205	Freshman	Los Angeles, CA	Transferred to Green Bay
Garwey Dual	3	G	6'5"	190	Freshman	Houston, TX	Transferred to Seton Hall
Josh Oduro	13	F	6'9"	240	GS senior	Gainesville, VA	Graduated
Devin Carter	22	G	6'3"	195	Junior	Miami, FL	Declared for 2024 NBA draft; selected 13th overall by Sacramento Kings
Rafael Castro	30	F	6'11"	220	(redshirt) Sophomore	Dover, NJ	Transferred to George Washington

=== Incoming transfers ===
Name	Number	Pos.	Height	Weight	Year	Hometown	Previous school
Wesley Cardet Jr.	0	G	6'6"	204	Senior	Tallhahassee, FL	Chicago State
Christ Essandoko	2	C	7'0"	285	(redshirt) Freshman	Paris, France	Saint Joseph's
Jabri Abdur-Rahim	3	G	6'8"	215	GS senior	South Orange, NJ	Georgia
Anton Bonke	5	C	7'2"		Sophomore	Port Vila, Vanuatu	Eastern Arizona College
Bensley Joseph	7	G	6'1"	195	Senior	Arlington, MA	Miami (FL)

=== Recruiting classes ===
==== 2024 recruiting class ====
College recruiting
Name	Hometown	School	Height	Weight	Commit date
Oswin Erhunmwunse* #23 C	Putnam, CT	Putnam Science Academy	6 ft 9 in (2.06 m)	210 lb (95 kg)	Jan 11, 2024
Oswin Erhunmwunse* #23 C	Recruit ratings: Rivals: 247Sports: ESPN: (81)				
Ryan Mela; SF	Natick, MA	The Newman School	6 ft 6 in (1.98 m)	195 lb (88 kg)	Aug 1, 2023
Ryan Mela; SF	Recruit ratings: Scout: Rivals: 247Sports: ESPN: (NR)				
Overall recruit ranking:
Note: In many cases, Scout, Rivals, 247Sports, On3, and ESPN may conflict in their listings of height and weight.; In these cases, the average was taken. ESPN grades are on a 100-point scale.; Sources: "2024 Team Ranking". Rivals.

*Originally class of 2025, but reclassified to 2024.

==== 2025 recruiting class ====
College recruiting (2025)
Name	Hometown	School	Height	Weight	Commit date
Jamier Jones #8 SF	Sarasota, FL	Oak Ridge High School	6 ft 6 in (1.98 m)	220 lb (100 kg)	May 12, 2024
Jamier Jones #8 SF	Recruit ratings: Rivals: 247Sports: ESPN: (88)				
Jaylen Harrell #29 SF	Needham, MA	Saint Sebastians Country Day School	6 ft 6 in (1.98 m)	190 lb (86 kg)	Jul 1, 2024
Jaylen Harrell #29 SF	Recruit ratings: Rivals: 247Sports: ESPN: (81)				
Overall recruit ranking:
Note: In many cases, Scout, Rivals, 247Sports, On3, and ESPN may conflict in their listings of height and weight.; In these cases, the average was taken. ESPN grades are on a 100-point scale.; Sources: "2025 Team Ranking". Rivals.

== Roster ==
2024–25 Providence Friars men's basketball team
Players
Coaches

Pos.	#	Name	Height	Weight	Year	Previous school	Hometown
G	0	Wesley Cardet Jr.	6 ft 6 in (1.98 m)	210 lb (95 kg)	Sr	West Oaks Academy; Chicago State	Tallahassee, Florida
G	1	Jayden Pierre	6 ft 2 in (1.88 m)	182 lb (83 kg)	Jr	Long Island Lutheran High School	Elizabeth, New Jersey
C	2	Christ Essandoko	7 ft 0 in (2.13 m)	290 lb (132 kg)	RS So	Winston Salem Christian School; Saint Joseph's	Paris, France
G	3	Jabri Abdur-Rahim	6 ft 8 in (2.03 m)	220 lb (100 kg)	GS	Blair Academy; Georgia	South Orange, NJ
G	4	Justyn Fernandez	6 ft 5 in (1.96 m)	205 lb (93 kg)	RS So	IMG Academy; George Mason	Richmond, Virginia
C	5	Anton Bonke	7 ft 2 in (2.18 m)	270 lb (122 kg)	So	Lycée Français J. M. G. Le Clézio; Eastern Arizona College	Port Vila, Vanuatu
G	7	Bensley Joseph	6 ft 1 in (1.85 m)	188 lb (85 kg)	Sr	Putnam Science Academy (CT); Miami (FL)	Arlington, Massachusetts
G/F	10	Rich Barron	6 ft 5 in (1.96 m)	220 lb (100 kg)	So	St. Ignatius	Chicago, Illinois
F	11	Ryan Mela	6 ft 6 in (1.98 m)	200 lb (91 kg)	Fr	Newman School	Natick, Massachusetts
F	12	Eli DeLaurier	6 ft 10 in (2.08 m)	225 lb (102 kg)	RS Fr	Miller School	Shipman, Virginia
G	14	Corey Floyd Jr.	6 ft 4 in (1.93 m)	210 lb (95 kg)	RS Jr	Roselle Catholic High School; UConn	Franklin, New Jersey
G	20	Nilavan Jotham Daniels (W)	6 ft 3 in (1.91 m)	180 lb (82 kg)	Fr	Link Year Prep	St. Louis, Missouri
G/F	23	Bryce Hopkins (injured)	6 ft 7 in (2.01 m)	220 lb (100 kg)	Sr	Fenwick High School; Kentucky	Oak Park, Illinois
G	24	Luke Fonts (W)	6 ft 1 in (1.85 m)	190 lb (86 kg)	Sr	Portsmouth Abbey School	Portsmouth, Rhode Island
F	33	Kieran O'Haire (W)	6 ft 2 in (1.88 m)	195 lb (88 kg)	Sr	The Albany Academy	Menands, New York
F	55	Oswin Erhunmwunse	6 ft 10 in (2.08 m)	200 lb (91 kg)	Fr	Putnam Science Academy (CT)	Benin City, Nigeria

Head coach

- Kim English (Missouri)

Assistant coach(es)

- Dennis Felton (Howard)
- Nate Tomlinson (Colorado)
- Tim Fuller (Wake Forest)
- Matt Palumbo (Virginia)

Legend

- (C) Team captain
- (S) Suspended
- (I) Ineligible
- (W) Walk-on
- Injured
- Current redshirt

Roster

== Schedule and results ==
Date time, TV	Rank^{#}	Opponent^{#}	Result	Record	High points	High rebounds	High assists	Site (attendance) city, state
Exhibition
October 26, 2024*; 4:00 p.m.		UMass	W 63–54		19 – Floyd Jr.	7 – DeLaurier	8 – Joseph	Amica Mutual Pavilion (4,786); Providence, RI
Regular season
November 4, 2024*; 7:00 p.m., FS1		Central Connecticut	W 59–55	1–0	21 – Joesph	7 – Essandoko	3 – Essandoko	Amica Mutual Pavilion (9,806); Providence, RI
November 9, 2024*; 6:00 p.m., FS2		Stonehill	W 76–49	2–0	16 – Abdur-Rahim	8 – Cardet	3 – Tied	Amica Mutual Pavilion (11,027); Providence, RI
November 12, 2024*; 6:30 p.m., FS1		Hampton	W 60–51	3–0	13 – Tied	6 – Tied	5 – Joseph	Amica Mutual Pavilion (7,821); Providence, RI
November 16, 2024*; 5:00 p.m., FS2		Green Bay	W 79–65	4–0	18 – Pierre	7 – Cardet Jr.	4 – Joseph	Amica Mutual Pavilion (11,927); Providence, RI
November 19, 2024*; 7:00 p.m., FS2		Delaware State	W 78–48	5–0	13 – Erhunmwunse	12 – Essandoko	7 – Joseph	Amica Mutual Pavilion (7,489); Providence, RI
November 27, 2024*; 5:00 p.m., ESPN2		vs. Oklahoma; Battle 4 Atlantis quarterfinals	L 77–79	5–1	17 – Cardet	6 – Pierre	5 – Pierre	Imperial Arena (801); Paradise Island, Bahamas
November 28, 2024*; 7:30 p.m., ESPN2		vs. Davidson; Battle 4 Atlantis consolation 2nd round	L 58–69	5–2	14 – Pierre	11 – Erhunmwunse	3 – Floyd Jr.	Imperial Arena (760); Paradise Island, Bahamas
November 29, 2024*; 11:00 a.m., ESPN2		vs. No. 14 Indiana; Battle 4 Atlantis 7th place game	L 73–89	5–3	22 – Pierre	5 – Tied	6 – Pierre	Imperial Arena (1,117); Paradise Island, Bahamas
December 3, 2024*; 8:30 p.m., FS1		BYU; Big East–Big 12 Battle	W 83–64	6–3	21 – Abdur-Rahim	6 – Essandoko	4 – Hopkins	Amica Mutual Pavilion (12,005); Providence, RI
December 7, 2024*; 12:00 p.m., CBSSN		at Rhode Island; Ocean State Rivalry	L 63–69	6–4	16 – Tied	8 – Hopkins	3 – Joseph	Ryan Center (7,685); Kingston, RI
December 10, 2024; 8:30 p.m., FS1		at DePaul	W 70–63 ^{OT}	7–4 (1–0)	20 – Joseph	10 – Hopkins	7 – Joseph	Wintrust Arena (3,548); Chicago, IL
December 14, 2024*; 5:00 p.m., CBSSN		vs. St. Bonaventure; Basketball Hall of Fame Showcase	L 70–74	7–5	13 – Cardet Jr.	8 – Erhunmwunse	4 – Pierre	Mohegan Sun Arena (6,307); Uncasville, CT
December 20, 2024; 8:00 p.m., FOX		St. John's	L 70–72	7–6 (1–1)	17 – Joseph	8 – Joseph	2 – Joseph	Amica Mutual Pavilion; Providence, RI
December 31, 2024; 6:00 p.m., FS1		No. 8 Marquette	L 50–78	7–7 (1–2)	11 – Cardet Jr.	8 – Mela	6 – Pierre	Amica Mutual Pavilion (11,604); Providence, RI
January 5, 2025; 2:00 p.m., NBC		at No. 11 UConn	L 84–87	7–8 (1–3)	24 – Pierre	9 – Erhunmwunse	2 – Tied	Gampel Pavilion (10,299); Storrs, CT
January 8, 2025; 8:30 p.m., Peacock		Butler	W 84–65	8–8 (2–3)	18 – Tied	15 – Mela	4 – Mela	Amica Mutual Pavilion (8,111); Providence, RI
January 11, 2025; 5:00 p.m., CBSSN		Seton Hall	W 91–85	9–8 (3–3)	28 – Joseph	10 – Erhunmwunse	5 – Tied	Amica Mutual Pavilion (12,193); Providence, RI
January 14, 2025; 8:30 p.m., FS1		at Creighton	L 64–84	9–9 (3–4)	10 – Tied	8 – Tied	3 – Mela	CHI Health Center Omaha (17,063); Omaha, NE
January 17, 2025; 7:00 p.m., FS1		at Villanova	L 73–75	9–10 (3–5)	20 – Joseph	8 – Erhunmwunse	7 – Pierre	Wells Fargo Center (10,253); Philadelphia, PA
January 25, 2025; 12:35 p.m., FOX		Georgetown	W 78–68	10–10 (4–5)	14 – Tied	7 – Essandoko	5 – Floyd Jr.	Amica Mutual Pavilion (12,400); Providence, RI
January 28, 2025; 7:00 p.m., Peacock		at Seton Hall	W 69–67	11–10 (5–5)	16 – Pierre	7 – Tied	5 – Floyd Jr.	Prudential Center (8,422); Newark, NJ
February 1, 2025; 12:00 p.m., CBSSN		at No. 15 St. John's	L 66–68	11–11 (5–6)	27 – Abdur-Rahim	12 – Joseph	7 – Joseph	Madison Square Garden (19,196); New York, NY
February 5, 2025; 8:30 p.m., FS1		Creighton	L 69–80	11–12 (5–7)	16 – Floyd Jr.	10 – Floyd Jr.	5 – Pierre	Amica Mutual Pavilion (11,726); Providence, RI
February 8, 2025; 3:00 p.m., Peacock		at Butler	L 81–82	11–13 (5–8)	26 – Joseph	5 – Erhunmwunse	8 – Pierre	Hinkle Fieldhouse (8,312); Indianapolis, IN
February 12, 2025; 8:00 p.m., Peacock		Xavier	L 82–91	11–14 (5–9)	15 – Tied	10 – Mela	7 – Joseph	Amica Mutual Pavilion (5,752); Providence, RI
February 15, 2025; 6:00 p.m., CBSSN		Villanova	W 75–62	12–14 (6–9)	19 – Pierre	9 – Mela	6 – Tied	Amica Mutual Pavilion (12,444); Providence, RI
February 19, 2025; 7:00 p.m., FS1		at Georgetown	L 72–93	12–15 (6–10)	25 – Joseph	7 – Mela	4 – Joseph	Capital One Arena (5,326); Washington, D.C.
February 25, 2025; 7:00 p.m., FS1		at No. 21 Marquette	L 52–82	12–16 (6–11)	13 – Pierre	8 – Erhunmwunse	3 – Pierre	Fiserv Forum (16,094); Milwaukee, WI
March 1, 2025; 12:00 p.m., CBS		UConn	L 63–75	12–17 (6–12)	10 – Pierre	5 – Fernandez	5 – Joseph	Amica Mutual Pavilion (12,400); Providence, RI
March 5, 2025; 6:30 p.m., FS1		DePaul	L 77–80	12–18 (6–13)	25 – Floyd Jr.	8 – Floyd Jr.	6 – Joseph	Amica Mutual Pavilion (9,169); Providence, RI
March 8, 2025; 4:00 p.m., FS1		at Xavier	L 68–76	12–19 (6–14)	27 – Joseph	7 – Mela	4 – Tied	Cintas Center (10,532); Cincinnati, OH
Big East tournament
March 12, 2025; 4:00 p.m., Peacock	(8)	vs. (9) Butler; First round	L 69–75	12–20	20 – Joseph	11 – Erhunmwunse	55 – Pierre	Madison Square Garden; New York, NY
*Non-conference game. ^{#}Rankings from AP Poll. (#) Tournament seedings in parentheses. All times are in Eastern Time.

== Rankings ==
Ranking movements Legend: ██ Increase in ranking ██ Decrease in ranking — = Not ranked RV = Received votes
	Week																				
Poll	Pre	1	2	3	4	5	6	7	8	9	10	11	12	13	14	15	16	17	18	19	Final
AP	RV	RV	RV	RV	—	—	—	—	—	—	—	—	—	—	—	—	—	—	—	—	—
Coaches	—	RV	—	—	—	—	—	—	—	—	—	—	—	—	—	—	—	—	—	—	—
