= 2024–25 St. John's Red Storm men's basketball team =

American college basketball season

2024–25 St. John's Red Storm men's basketball

Big East regular season & tournament champions

NCAA tournament, Second Round
- Conference: Big East Conference

Ranking
- Coaches: No. 10
- AP: No. 11
- Record: 31–5 (18–2 Big East)
- Head coach: Rick Pitino (2nd season)
- Associate head coach: Steve Masiello
- Assistant coaches: Ricky Johns; Van Macon; Bob Walsh; Taliek Brown
- Captains: Zuby Ejiofor; Kadary Richmond; Sadiku Ibine Ayo
- Home arena: Carnesecca Arena; Madison Square Garden

2024–25 Big East men's basketball standings
	Conf.				Overall
Team	W		L	PCT	W		L	PCT
No. 11 St. John's †	18	–	2	.900	31	–	5	.861
Creighton	15	–	5	.750	25	–	11	.694
UConn	14	–	6	.700	24	–	11	.686
Xavier	13	–	7	.650	22	–	12	.647
Marquette	13	–	7	.650	23	–	11	.676
Villanova	11	–	9	.550	21	–	15	.583
Georgetown	8	–	12	.400	18	–	16	.529
Providence	6	–	14	.300	12	–	20	.375
Butler	6	–	14	.300	15	–	20	.429
DePaul	4	–	16	.200	14	–	20	.412
Seton Hall	2	–	18	.100	7	–	25	.219
† 2025 Big East tournament winner Rankings from AP Poll

The 2024–25 St. John's Red Storm men's basketball team represented St. John's University during the 2024–25 NCAA Division I men's basketball season. They are coached by Rick Pitino, in his second year at the school, and play their home games at Carnesecca Arena and Madison Square Garden as members of the Big East Conference. The Red Storm had a breakout year under second year coach Rick Pitino to win both the Big East regular season and tournament championship, and got a #2 seed to the NCAA Tournament. However, they lost to #10 seed Arkansas in the Round of 32.

== Previous season ==
The Red Storm finished the season 20–13, 11–9 in Big East play to finish in fifth place. They defeated Seton Hall in the quarterfinals of the Big East tournament before losing in the semifinals to UConn.

== Offseason ==
Departures
Name	Number	Pos.	Height	Weight	Year	Hometown	Reason for departure
Cruz Davis	0	G	6'3"	172	Sophomore	Plano, TX	Transferred to Hofstra
Jordan Dingle	3	G	6'3"	196	Senior	Valley Stream, NY	Graduated
Nahiem Alleyne	4	G	6'4"	200	GS Senior	Buford, GA	Graduated
Daniss Jenkins	5	G	6'3"	175	GS Senior	Dallas, TX	Graduated, signed with the Detroit Pistons
Chris Ledlum	8	G/F	6'6"	225	GS Senior	Brooklyn, NY	Graduated
Joel Soriano	11	F	6'11"	255	GS Senior	Yonkers, NY	Graduated, signed with the Charlotte Hornets
Sean Conway	30	G	6'4"	200	GS Senior	Fairfield, CT	Graduated
Glenn Taylor Jr.	35	F	6'6"	205	Junior	Las Vegas, NV	Transferred to Oklahoma
Drissa Traore	55	F	6'8"	215	(redshirt) Junior	New York City, NY	Transferred to Rhode Island

Incoming transfers
Name	Num	Pos	Height	Weight	Year	Hometown	Previous school
Aaron Scott	0	G/F	6'7"	200	Senior	Spring, TX	North Texas (1 yr immediate eligibility)
Kadary Richmond	1	F	6'6"	205	GS Senior	Brooklyn, NY	Seton Hall (1 yr immediate eligibility)
Deivon Smith	5	G	6'1"	172	Senior	Loganville, GA	Utah (1 yr immediate eligibility)
Vince Iwuchukwu	8	F	7'1"	240	Junior	San Antonio, TX	USC (2 yrs immediate eligibility)

=== Recruiting classes ===
==== 2024 recruiting class ====
College recruiting information
Name	Hometown	School	Height	Weight	Commit date
Jaiden Glover #23 SF	Elizabeth, NJ	The Patrick School	6 ft 5 in (1.96 m)	180 lb (82 kg)	Sep 12, 2023
Jaiden Glover #23 SF	Recruit ratings: Rivals: 247Sports: ESPN: (84)				
Khaman Maker #34 C	Las Vegas, NV	Trinity International School	7 ft 0 in (2.13 m)	205 lb (93 kg)	Sep 18, 2023
Khaman Maker #34 C	Recruit ratings: Rivals: 247Sports: ESPN: (80)				
Lefteris Liotopoulos; SG	Thessaloniki, Greece	DEKA Academy	6 ft 5 in (1.96 m)	N/A	May 23, 2023
Lefteris Liotopoulos; SG	Recruit ratings: Rivals: 247Sports: ESPN: (NR)				
Rúben Prey; PF	Lisbon, Portugal	Club Joventut de Badalona, S.A.D	6 ft 10 in (2.08 m)	N/A	Jun 17, 2024
Rúben Prey; PF	Recruit ratings: Rivals: 247Sports: ESPN: (NR)				
Overall recruit ranking:
Note: In many cases, Scout, Rivals, 247Sports, On3, and ESPN may conflict in their listings of height and weight.; In these cases, the average was taken. ESPN grades are on a 100-point scale.; Sources: "2024 Team Ranking". Rivals.

== Roster ==
2024–25 St. John's Red Storm men's basketball team
Players
Coaches

Pos.	#	Name	Height	Weight	Year	Previous school	Hometown
F	0	Aaron Scott	6 ft 7 in (2.01 m)	210 lb (95 kg)	Sr	North Texas	Spring, TX
G	1	Kadary Richmond (C)	6 ft 6 in (1.98 m)	205 lb (93 kg)	GS	Seton Hall	Brooklyn, NY
F	2	Sadiku Ibine Ayo (C)	6 ft 6 in (1.98 m)	215 lb (98 kg)	Jr	Iona	Asabi-Kumasi, Ghana
G	5	Deivon Smith	6 ft 0 in (1.83 m)	175 lb (79 kg)	Sr	Utah	Decatur, GA
G	7	Simeon Wilcher	6 ft 4 in (1.93 m)	190 lb (86 kg)	So	Roselle Catholic	Plainfield, NJ
F	8	Vince Iwuchukwu	7 ft 1 in (2.16 m)	250 lb (113 kg)	Jr	USC	Lagos, Nigeria
F	11	Jaiden Glover	6 ft 4 in (1.93 m)	205 lb (93 kg)	Fr	The Patrick School	Brooklyn, NY
G	12	RJ Luis Jr.	6 ft 7 in (2.01 m)	215 lb (98 kg)	Jr	UMass	Miami, FL
C	14	Khaman Maker	7 ft 2 in (2.18 m)	220 lb (100 kg)	Fr	SFBA Trinity Prep	Juba, South Sudan
F	17	Rubén Prey	6 ft 10 in (2.08 m)	230 lb (104 kg)	Fr	Joventut Badalona	Lisbon, Portugal
F	24	Zuby Ejiofor (C)	6 ft 9 in (2.06 m)	240 lb (109 kg)	Jr	Kansas	Garland, TX
G	31	Lefteris Liotopoulos	6 ft 5 in (1.96 m)	200 lb (91 kg)	Fr	DEKA Academy	Thessaloniki, Greece
F	44	Brady Dunlap (injured)	6 ft 7 in (2.01 m)	190 lb (86 kg)	So	Harvard-Westlake	Newhall, CA

Head coach

- Rick Pitino (UMass)

Assistant coach(es)

- Steve Masiello (Kentucky)
- Ricky Johns (Monroe)
- Van Macon (Southampton)
- Bob Walsh (Hamilton)
- Taliek Brown (Connecticut)

Legend

- (C) Team captain
- (S) Suspended
- (I) Ineligible
- (W) Walk-on
- Injured
- Current redshirt

Roster

== Schedule and results ==
Date time, TV	Rank^{#}	Opponent^{#}	Result	Record	High points	High rebounds	High assists	Site (attendance) city, state
Exhibition
October 17, 2024*; 6:30 p.m., BTN		at No. 25 Rutgers; Charity Exhibition benefiting the V Foundation	W 91–85		27 – Ejiofor	13 – Ejiofor	6 – Richmond	Jersey Mike's Arena (4,240); Piscataway, NJ
October 26, 2024*; 12:00 p.m.		Towson; Charity Exhibition benefiting Autism Speaks	W 64–46		11 – Tied	8 – Luis Jr.	2 – Tied	Carnesecca Arena (1,742); Queens, NY
Regular season
November 4, 2024*; 6:30 p.m., FS1		Fordham; Rivalry	W 92–60	1–0	17 – Wilcher	9 – Richmond	6 – Smith	Carnesecca Arena (5,602); Queens, NY
November 9, 2024*; 2:00 p.m., FS2		Quinnipiac	W 96–73	2–0	24 – Luis Jr.	13 – Luis Jr.	10 – Smith	Carnesecca Arena (5,602); Queens, NY
November 13, 2024*; 6:30 p.m., FS2	No. 22	Wagner	W 66–45	3–0	13 – Luis Jr.	8 – Smith	7 – Richmond	Carnesecca Arena (4,751); Queens, NY
November 17, 2024*; 12:00 p.m., FS1	No. 22	New Mexico; NYC Hoops for Heroes Classic	W 85–71	4–0	21 – Luis Jr.	11 – Luis Jr.	7 – Luis Jr.	Madison Square Garden (12,310); New York, NY
November 21, 2024*; 7:00 p.m., CBSSN	No. 22	vs. No. 13 Baylor; Bahamas Championship semifinals	L 98–99 ^{2OT}	4–1	22 – Ejiofor	10 – Ejiofor	7 – Richmond	Baha Mar Convention Center (2,077); Nassau, Bahamas
November 22, 2024*; 7:00 p.m., CBSSN	No. 22	vs. Virginia; Bahamas Championship 3rd place game	W 80–55	5–1	18 – Luis Jr.	10 – Smith	8 – Smith	Baha Mar Convention Center (2,119); Nassau, Bahamas
November 24, 2024*; 11:00 a.m., CBSSN	No. 22	vs. Georgia; Atlantis Resort Series	L 63–66	5–2	22 – Ejiofor	8 – Ejiofor	2 – Tied	Imperial Arena (419); Nassau, Bahamas
November 30, 2024*; 5:00 p.m., Peacock		Harvard	W 77–64	6–2	24 – Luis Jr.	10 – Luis Jr.	4 – Tied	Carnesecca Arena (5,602); Queens, NY
December 7, 2024*; 11:30 a.m., FOX		Kansas State; Big East–Big 12 Battle	W 88–71	7–2	28 – Ejiofor	13 – Ejiofor	4 – Tied	Carnesecca Arena (5,602); Queens, NY
December 11, 2024*; 7:00 p.m., CBSSN		Bryant	W 99–77	8–2	22 – Ejiofor	10 – Tied	5 – Richmond	Carnesecca Arena (4,573); Queens, NY
December 17, 2024; 6:30 p.m., Peacock		DePaul	W 89–61	9–2 (1–0)	19 – Luis Jr.	7 – Tied	8 – Smith	Carnesecca Arena (5,602); Queens, NY
December 20, 2024; 8:00 p.m., FOX		at Providence	W 72–70	10–2 (2–0)	19 – Ejiofor	10 – Ejiofor	4 – Smith	Amica Mutual Pavilion (12,104); Providence, RI
December 28, 2024*; 6:00 p.m., FS1		Delaware	W 97–76	11–2	20 – Smith	13 – Smith	8 – Smith	Carnesecca Arena (5,602); Queens, NY
December 31, 2024; 4:00 p.m., Peacock		at Creighton	L 56–57	11–3 (2–1)	16 – Ejiofor	8 – Ejiofor	2 – Tied	CHI Health Center Omaha (17,466); Omaha, NE
January 4, 2025; 2:00 p.m., FS1		Butler	W 70–62	12–3 (3–1)	20 – Luis Jr.	11 – Luis Jr.	6 – Richmond	Carnesecca Arena (5,602); Queens, NY
January 7, 2025; 6:30 p.m., FS1		at Xavier	W 82–72	13–3 (4–1)	18 – Tied	12 – Ejiofor	6 – Richmond	Cintas Center (9,328); Cincinnati, OH
January 11, 2025; 7:00 p.m., CBSSN		Villanova	W 80–68	14–3 (5–1)	30 – Luis Jr.	10 – Luis Jr.	5 – Richmond	Madison Square Garden (18,178); New York, NY
January 14, 2025; 7:30 p.m., Peacock		Georgetown; Rivalry	W 63–58	15–3 (6–1)	19 – Luis Jr.	9 – Tied	8 – Richmond	Madison Square Garden (12,757); New York, NY
January 18, 2025; 8:00 p.m., FS1		at Seton Hall	W 79–51	16–3 (7–1)	24 – Luis Jr.	9 – Ejiofor	6 – Richmond	Prudential Center (9,652); Newark, NJ
January 22, 2025; 7:00 p.m., FS1	No. 20	Xavier	W 79–71 ^{OT}	17–3 (8–1)	19 – Richmond	8 – Ejiofor	5 – Richmond	Madison Square Garden (14,545); New York, NY
January 28, 2025; 6:30 p.m., FS1	No. 15	at Georgetown; Rivalry	W 66–41	18–3 (9–1)	13 – Tied	9 – Tied	5 – Wilcher	Capital One Arena (4,386); Washington, D.C.
February 1, 2025; 12:00 p.m., CBSSN	No. 15	Providence	W 68–66	19–3 (10–1)	24 – Richmond	8 – Tied	8 – Richmond	Madison Square Garden (19,196); New York, NY
February 4, 2025; 6:30 p.m., FS1	No. 12	No. 11 Marquette	W 70–64	20–3 (11–1)	18 – Richmond	13 – Ejiofor	8 – Richmond	Madison Square Garden (16,521); New York, NY
February 7, 2025; 8:00 p.m., FOX	No. 12	at No. 19 UConn	W 68–62	21–3 (12–1)	21 – Luis Jr.	7 – Luis Jr.	6 – Richmond	Gampel Pavilion (10,299); Storrs, CT
February 12, 2025; 6:00 p.m., FS1	No. 9	at Villanova	L 71–73	21–4 (12–2)	22 – Scott	8 – Luis Jr.	10 – Richmond	Finneran Pavilion (6,501); Villanova, PA
February 16, 2025; 3:00 p.m., FS1	No. 9	No. 24 Creighton; Johnnies Day	W 79–73	22–4 (13–2)	23 – Luis Jr.	14 – Luis Jr.	5 – Tied	Madison Square Garden (19,812); New York, NY
February 19, 2025; 9:00 p.m., FS1	No. 10	at DePaul	W 82–58	23–4 (14–2)	18 – Smith	9 – Tied	5 – Tied	Wintrust Arena (4,844); Chicago, IL
February 23, 2025; 12:00 p.m., FOX	No. 10	UConn	W 89–75	24–4 (15–2)	18 – Tied	9 – Ejiofor	8 – Smith	Madison Square Garden (19,812); New York, NY
February 26, 2025; 9:00 p.m., CBSSN	No. 7	at Butler	W 76–70	25–4 (16–2)	24 – Luis Jr.	6 – Tied	5 – Richmond	Hinkle Fieldhouse (7,086); Indianapolis, IN
March 1, 2025; 2:15 p.m., CBS	No. 7	Seton Hall	W 71–61	26–4 (17–2)	21 – Luis Jr.	10 – Ejiofor	7 – Richmond	Madison Square Garden (19,812); New York, NY
March 8, 2025; 12:00 p.m., FOX	No. 6	at No. 20 Marquette	W 86–84 ^{OT}	27–4 (18–2)	28 – Luis Jr.	12 – Tied	11 – Richmond	Fiserv Forum (17,983); Milwaukee, WI
Big East tournament
March 13, 2025; 12:00 p.m., Peacock	(1) No. 6	vs. (9) Butler; Quarterfinal	W 78–57	28–4	20 – Luis Jr.	8 – Richmond	9 – Richmond	Madison Square Garden (19,812); New York, NY
March 14, 2025; 6:40 p.m., FOX	(1) No. 6	vs. (5) No. 25 Marquette; Semifinal	W 79–63	29–4	33 – Ejiofor	10 – Richmond	6 – Richmond	Madison Square Garden (19,812); New York, NY
March 15, 2025; 6:38 p.m., FOX	(1) No. 6	vs. (2) Creighton; Championship	W 82–66	30–4	29 – Luis Jr.	12 – Richmond	4 – Tied	Madison Square Garden (19,812); New York, NY
NCAA tournament
March 20, 2025*; 9:45 p.m., CBS	(2 W) No. 5	vs. (15 W) Omaha; First Round	W 83–53	31–4	22 – Luis Jr.	8 – Tied	6 – Richmond	Amica Mutual Pavilion (11,434); Providence, RI
March 22, 2025*; 2:40 p.m., CBS	(2 W) No. 5	vs. (10 W) Arkansas; Second Round	L 66–75	31–5	23 – Ejiofor	12 – Ejiofor	2 – Richmond	Amica Mutual Pavilion (11,478); Providence, RI
*Non-conference game. ^{#}Rankings from AP Poll. (#) Tournament seedings in parentheses. W=West. All times are in Eastern Time.

== Awards and honors ==
Preseason honors
Honors	Player	Position	Date awarded	Ref.
Preseason All-Big East First Team	Kadary Richmond	G	October 23, 2024	
Preseason All-Big East Second Team	Deivon Smith	G	October 23, 2024	

Weekly honors
Honors	Player	Position	Date awarded	Ref.
Big East Men's Basketball Player of the Week	R.J. Luis	G/F	January 13, 2025	
Big East Men's Basketball Player of the Week	R.J. Luis	G/F	February 10, 2025	
Naismith Trophy National Player of the Week	R.J. Luis	G/F	February 10, 2025	
Jersey Mike's Naismith Men's Player of the Year Midseason Team	R.J. Luis	G/F	February 14, 2025	
Big East Men's Basketball Player of the Week	Kadary Richmond	G	February 24, 2025	

Postseason honors
Honors	Player	Position	Date awarded	Ref.
All-Big East First Team	RJ Luis Jr.	G/F	March 9, 2025	
All-Big East First Team	Zuby Ejiofor	F	March 9, 2025	
All-Big East Second Team	Kadary Richmond	G	March 9, 2025	
Big East Most Improved Player	Zuby Ejiofor	F	March 10. 2025	
Big East Player of the Year	RJ Luis Jr.	G/F	March 12. 2025	
Big East Coach of the Year	Rick Pitino	HC	March 12. 2025	

== Rankings ==
Ranking movements Legend: ██ Increase in ranking ██ Decrease in ranking RV = Received votes
	Week																				
Poll	Pre	1	2	3	4	5	6	7	8	9	10	11	12	13	14	15	16	17	18	19	Final
AP	RV	22	22	RV	RV	RV	RV	RV	RV	RV	RV	20	15	12	9	10	7	6	6	5	11
Coaches	RV	25	21	RV	RV	RV	RV	24	RV	RV	RV	21	14	10	8	9	7	6	5	5	10
