= 2024–25 DePaul Blue Demons men's basketball team =

American college basketball season

2024–25 DePaul Blue Demons men's basketball
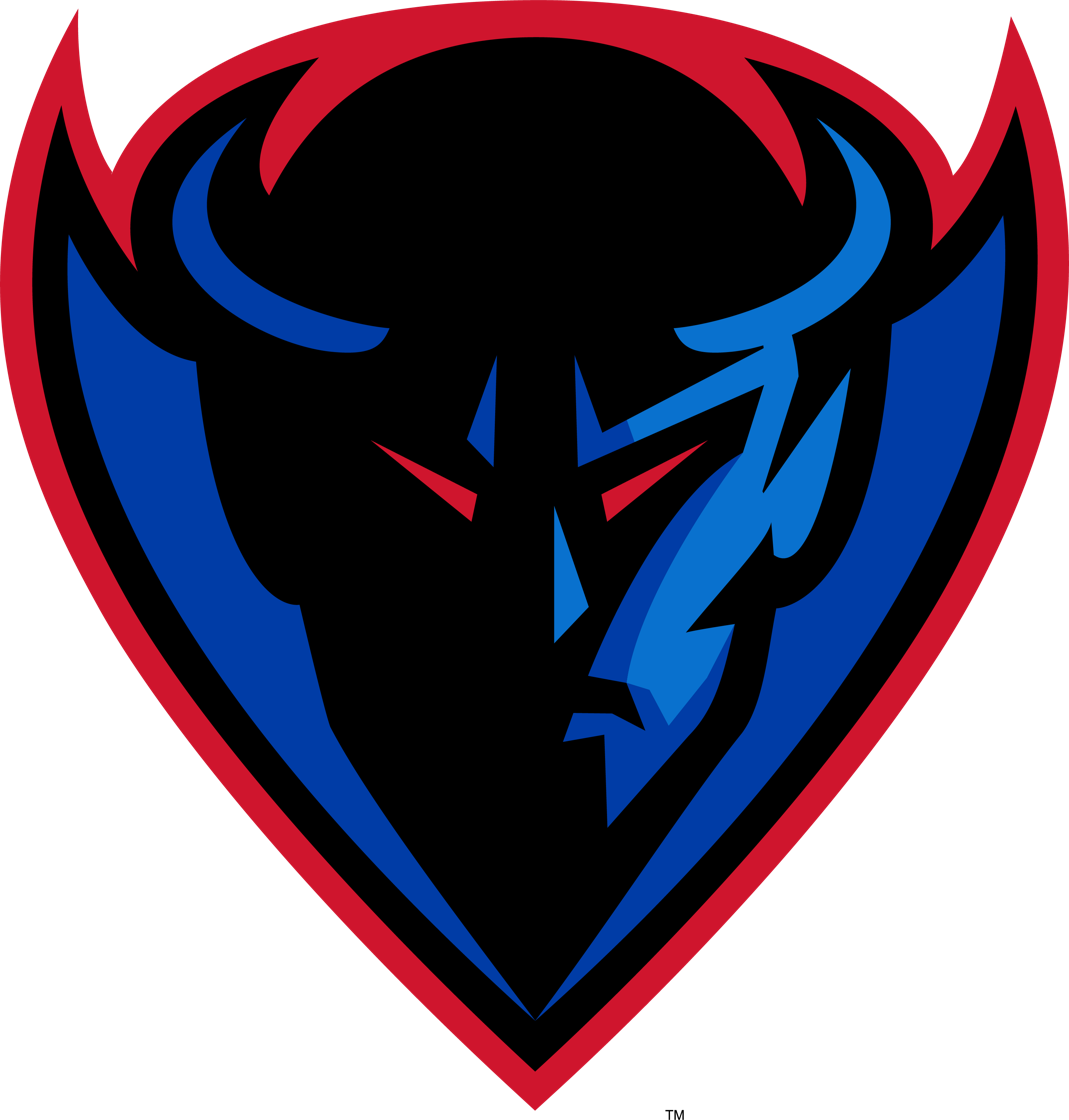

College Basketball Crown, First Round
- Conference: Big East Conference
- Record: 14–20 (4–16 Big East)
- Head coach: Chris Holtmann (1st season)
- Assistant coaches: Jack Owens (1st season); Bryan Mullins (1st season); Paris Parham (4th season); LaVall Jordan (1st season); Brandon Bailey (1st season)
- Home arena: Wintrust Arena

2024–25 Big East men's basketball standings
| | Conf. | | | | Overall |
| Team | W | | L | PCT | W | | L | PCT |
|---|---|---|---|---|---|---|---|---|
| No. 11 St. John's † | 18 | – | 2 | .900 | 31 | – | 5 | .861 |
| Creighton | 15 | – | 5 | .750 | 25 | – | 11 | .694 |
| UConn | 14 | – | 6 | .700 | 24 | – | 11 | .686 |
| Xavier | 13 | – | 7 | .650 | 22 | – | 12 | .647 |
| Marquette | 13 | – | 7 | .650 | 23 | – | 11 | .676 |
| Villanova | 11 | – | 9 | .550 | 21 | – | 15 | .583 |
| Georgetown | 8 | – | 12 | .400 | 18 | – | 16 | .529 |
| Providence | 6 | – | 14 | .300 | 12 | – | 20 | .375 |
| Butler | 6 | – | 14 | .300 | 15 | – | 20 | .429 |
| DePaul | 4 | – | 16 | .200 | 14 | – | 20 | .412 |
| Seton Hall | 2 | – | 18 | .100 | 7 | – | 25 | .219 |
† 2025 Big East tournament winner Rankings from AP Poll

The 2024–25 DePaul Blue Demons men's basketball team represented DePaul University during the 2024–25 NCAA Division I men's basketball season. They were led by first-year head coach Chris Holtmann. They play their home games at Wintrust Arena in Chicago, Illinois, as members of the Big East Conference. They finished the season 14–20, 4–16 in Big East play to finish in 10th place. They defeated Georgetown in the first round of the Big East tournament before losing to Creighton in the quarterfinals. They were selected to participate in the first-ever College Basketball Crown postseason tournament.

== Previous season ==
The Blue Demons finished the 2023–24 season 3–29, 0–20 in Big East play to finish in last place. They lost to Villanova in the first round of the Big East tournament.

On January 22, 2024, the school fired head coach Tony Stubblefield after starting the season 3–15. Special assistant to the head coach Matt Brady was named the interim head coach for the remainder of the season. On March 14, the school named former Butler and Ohio State head coach Chris Holtmann the team's new head coach.

== Offseason ==
=== Departures ===
DePaul departures
| Name | Number | Pos. | Height | Weight | Year | Hometown | Reason for departure |
|---|---|---|---|---|---|---|---|
| Zion Cruz | 0 | G | 6'4" | 183 | Sophomore | Jersey City, NJ | Transferred to Rider |
| Chico Carter Jr. | 2 | G | 6'3" | 192 | GS senior | Columbia, SC | Graduated |
| Jalen Terry | 3 | G | 6'0" | 158 | Senior | Flint, MI | Graduate transferred to Eastern Michigan |
| K. T. Raimey | 4 | G/F | 6'3" | 166 | Senior | Olathe, KS | Graduate transferred to UT Rio Grande Valley |
| Churchill Abass | 5 | C | 6'9" | 240 | Freshman | Edo State, Nigeria | Transferred to Wake Forest |
| Jaden Henley | 10 | G/F | 6'7" | 200 | Sophomore | Ontario, CA | Transferred to UNLV |
| Keyondre Young | 11 | G | 6'8" | 180 | Junior | Del City, OK | Transferred to Oklahoma Christian |
| Mac Etienne | 12 | F | 6'10" | 235 | (redshirt) Sophomore | New York, NY | Transferred to La Salle |
| Da'Sean Nelson | 21 | F | 6'8" | 205 | Senior | Toledo, OH | Graduate transferred to Eastern Michigan |
| Elijah Fisher | 22 | G | 6'6" | 190 | Sophomore | Oshawa, ON | Transferred to Pacific |
| Caleb Murphy | 23 | G | 6'4" | 185 | Senior | Youngstown, OH | Graduate transferred to UMass Lowell |
| Jeremiah Oden | 25 | F | 6'8" | 201 | Senior | Chicago, IL | Graduate transferred to Charlotte |
| Dramane Camara | 35 | G | 6'5" | 205 | Freshman | Paris, France | Transferred to Norfolk State |
| Mo Sall | 55 | G | 6'5" | 180 | Sophomore | Downers Grove, IL | Walk-on; transferred to Northern Illinois |

=== Incoming transfers ===
DePaul transfers
| Name | Number | Pos. | Height | Weight | Year | Hometown | Previous school |
|---|---|---|---|---|---|---|---|
| Troy D'Amico | 0 | G | 6'7" | 212 | Senior | Chicago, IL | Southern Illinois |
| Isaiah Rivera | 1 | G | 6'5" | 210 | GS senior | Geneseo, IL | UIC |
| Layden Blocker | 2 | G | 6'2" | 175 | Sophomore | Little Rock, AR | Arkansas |
| Conor Enright | 4 | G | 6'0" | 180 | (redshirt) Junior | Mundelein, IL | Drake |
| CJ Gunn | 11 | G | 6'6" | 194 | Sophomore | Indianapolis, IN | Indiana |
| Jacob Meyer | 12 | G | 6'2" | 195 | Sophomore | Covington, KY | Coastal Carolina |
| JJ Traynor | 20 | F | 6'8" | 190 | GS senior | Bardstown, KY | Louisville |
| David Thomas | 23 | G | 6'2" | 195 | Sophomore | McDonough, GA | Mercer |
| N.J. Benson | 35 | F | 6'8" | 225 | Junior | Mount Vernon, IL | Missouri State |
| David Skogman | 42 | C | 6'10" | 235 | GS senior | Waukesha, WI | Davidson |

=== Recruiting classes ===
==== 2024 recruiting class ====
College recruiting
| Name | Hometown | School | Height | Weight | Commit date |
|---|---|---|---|---|---|
| Chris Riddle #33 SF | Chicago, IL | Kenwood Academy High School | 6 ft 5 in (1.96 m) | 205 lb (93 kg) | Oct 25, 2023 |
| Chris Riddle #33 SF | Recruit ratings: Rivals: 247Sports: ESPN: (78) | | | | |
| Sekou Konneh; PF | Milwaukee, WI | St. Thomas More | 6 ft 7 in (2.01 m) | 180 lb (82 kg) | Apr 9, 2024 |
| Sekou Konneh; PF | Recruit ratings: Rivals: 247Sports: ESPN: (NR) | | | | |
Overall recruit ranking:
Note: In many cases, Scout, Rivals, 247Sports, On3, and ESPN may conflict in their listings of height and weight.; In these cases, the average was taken. ESPN grades are on a 100-point scale.; Sources: "2024 DePaul Signees". Rivals.; "2024 DePaul Signees". ESPN.; "2024 Team Ranking". Rivals.

==== 2025 recruiting class ====
College recruiting (2025)
| Name | Hometown | School | Height | Weight | Commit date |
|---|---|---|---|---|---|
| Isaiah Medina; C | St. Petersburg, FL | Gibbs | 7 ft 1 in (2.16 m) | 205 lb (93 kg) | Aug 5, 2024 |
| Isaiah Medina; C | Recruit ratings: Rivals: 247Sports: ESPN: (NR) | | | | |
| Kruz McClure; SG | Westerville, OH | Westerville South | 6 ft 5 in (1.96 m) | 175 lb (79 kg) | Aug 5, 2024 |
| Kruz McClure; SG | Recruit ratings: Rivals: 247Sports: ESPN: (NR) | | | | |
Overall recruit ranking:
Note: In many cases, Scout, Rivals, 247Sports, On3, and ESPN may conflict in their listings of height and weight.; In these cases, the average was taken. ESPN grades are on a 100-point scale.; Sources: "2025 DePaul Signees". Rivals.; "2025 DePaul Signees". ESPN.; "2025 Team Ranking". Rivals.

== Roster ==
2024–25 DePaul Blue Demons men's basketball team
Players
Coaches

| Pos. | # | Name | Height | Weight | Year | Previous school | Hometown |
|---|---|---|---|---|---|---|---|
| G | 0 | Troy D'Amico | 6 ft 7 in (2.01 m) | 215 lb (98 kg) | Sr | Notre Dame College Prep; Southern Illinois | Chicago, IL |
| G | 1 | Isaiah Rivera | 6 ft 5 in (1.96 m) | 210 lb (95 kg) | GS | Geneseo HS; UIC | Geneseo, IL |
| G | 2 | Layden Blocker | 6 ft 2 in (1.88 m) | 180 lb (82 kg) | So | Sunrise Christian Academy (KS); Arkansas | Little Rock, AR |
| G | 3 | Nate Kasher (W) | 6 ft 1 in (1.85 m) | 175 lb (79 kg) | Fr | Glenbrook HS | Glenview, IL |
| G | 4 | Conor Enright | 6 ft 2 in (1.88 m) | 175 lb (79 kg) | RS Jr | Mundelein HS; Drake | Mundelein, IL |
| F | 5 | Sekou Konneh | 6 ft 9 in (2.06 m) | 195 lb (88 kg) | Fr | St. Thomas HS | Milwaukee, WI |
| F | 10 | Chris Riddle | 6 ft 5 in (1.96 m) | 210 lb (95 kg) | Fr | Kenwood Academy | Chicago, IL |
| G | 11 | CJ Gunn | 6 ft 7 in (2.01 m) | 200 lb (91 kg) | Jr | Lawrence North HS; Indiana | Indianapolis, IN |
| G | 12 | Jacob Meyer | 6 ft 2 in (1.88 m) | 190 lb (86 kg) | So | Holy Cross HS; Coastal Carolina | Covington, KY |
| F | 20 | JJ Traynor | 6 ft 9 in (2.06 m) | 205 lb (93 kg) | GS | Bardstown HS; Louisville | Bardstown, KY |
| F | 21 | Théo Pierre-Justin | 6 ft 10 in (2.08 m) | 215 lb (98 kg) | Fr | Chorale Roanne Basket | Coudures, France |
| G | 23 | David Thomas | 6 ft 1 in (1.85 m) | 195 lb (88 kg) | So | Eagle's Landing HS; Mercer | McDonough, GA |
| F | 35 | N.J. Benson | 6 ft 8 in (2.03 m) | 230 lb (104 kg) | Jr | Mt. Vernon Township HS; Missouri State | Mount Vernon, IL |
| C | 42 | David Skogman | 6 ft 10 in (2.08 m) | 240 lb (109 kg) | GS | Waukesha HS; Davidson | Waukesha, WI |

Head coach

- Chris Holtmann (Taylor)

Assistant coach(es)

- Jack Owens (Eastern Illinois)
- Bryan Mullins (Southern Illinois)
- Paris Parham (Minnesota State)
- LaVall Jordan (Butler)
- Brandon Bailey (DePaul)

Legend

- (C) Team captain
- (S) Suspended
- (I) Ineligible
- (W) Walk-on
- Injured
- Current redshirt

Roster

== Schedule and results ==
| Date time, TV | Rank^{#} | Opponent^{#} | Result | Record | High points | High rebounds | High assists | Site (attendance) city, state |
Exhibition
| October 27, 2024*; 6:00 p.m. | | Illinois Wesleyan | W 76–60 | – | 19 – Tied | 9 – Skogman | 4 – Tied | Wintrust Arena (2,698); Chicago, IL |
Regular season
| November 4, 2024*; 7:00 p.m., FS1 | | Southern Indiana | W 80–78 ^{OT} | 1–0 | 25 – Rivera | 10 – Skogman | 4 – Enright | Wintrust Arena (3,051); Chicago, IL |
| November 7, 2024*; 7:00 p.m., FS1 | | Prairie View A&M | W 92–59 | 2–0 | 17 – Rivera | 9 – Benson | 7 – Tied | Wintrust Arena (2,725); Chicago, IL |
| November 11, 2024*; 8:00 p.m., FS2 | | Mercer | W 95–64 | 3–0 | 15 – Benson | 10 – Traynor | 8 – Enright | Wintrust Arena (2,913); Chicago, IL |
| November 15, 2024*; 8:00 p.m., FS2 | | Duquesne | W 84–58 | 4–0 | 18 – Rivera | 9 – Skogman | 8 – Enright | Wintrust Arena (3,303); Chicago, IL |
| November 19, 2024*; 8:00 p.m., FS2 | | Eastern Illinois; DePaul Classic | W 78–69 | 5–0 | 16 – Meyer | 6 – Skogman | 11 – Enright | Wintrust Arena (2,829); Chicago, IL |
| November 23, 2024*; 4:00 p.m., FS2 | | Northern Illinois; DePaul Classic | W 98–52 | 6–0 | 21 – Blocker | 11 – Skogman | 4 – Enright | Wintrust Arena (3,593); Chicago, IL |
| November 29, 2024*; 12:30 p.m., FS1 | | Valparaiso; DePaul Classic | W 89–70 | 7–0 | 19 – Rivera | 7 – Meyer | 8 – Enright | Wintrust Arena (3,366); Chicago, IL |
| December 4, 2024*; 8:00 p.m., ESPNU | | at Texas Tech; Big East–Big 12 Battle | L 62–76 | 7–1 | 14 – Meyer | 8 – Skogman | 9 – Enright | United Supermarkets Arena (11,465); Lubbock, TX |
| December 10, 2024; 7:30 p.m., FS1 | | Providence | L 63–70 ^{OT} | 7–2 (0–1) | 22 – Skogman | 6 – Skogman | 7 – Enright | Wintrust Arena (3,548); Chicago, IL |
| December 14, 2024*; 12:00 p.m., FS1 | | Wichita State | W 91–72 | 8–2 | 23 – Meyer | 7 – Rivera | 9 – Enright | Wintrust Arena (3,861); Chicago, IL |
| December 17, 2024; 5:30 p.m., Peacock | | at St. John's | L 61–89 | 8–3 (0–2) | 17 – Blocker | 4 – Tied | 3 – Enright | Carnesecca Arena (5,602); Queens, NY |
| December 21, 2024*; 3:00 p.m., BTN | | at Northwestern | L 64–84 | 8–4 | 18 – Meyer | 10 – Skogman | 6 – Enright | Welsh–Ryan Arena (5,752); Evanston, IL |
| December 28, 2024*; 1:00 p.m., FS1 | | Loyola (MD) | W 84–65 | 9–4 | 22 – Benson | 17 – Benson | 8 – Enright | Wintrust Arena (4,386); Chicago, IL |
| January 1, 2025; 1:00 p.m., CBSSN | | No. 11 UConn | L 68–81 | 9–5 (0–3) | 18 – Enright | 12 – Benson | 9 – Enright | Wintrust Arena (6,496); Chicago, IL |
| January 4, 2025; 11:00 a.m., FS1 | | at Villanova | L 56–100 | 9–6 (0–4) | 13 – Meyer | 6 – Benson | 2 – Tied | Finneran Pavilion (6,501); Villanova, PA |
| January 8, 2025; 5:30 p.m., Peacock | | at Seton Hall | L 80–85 ^{OT} | 9–7 (0–5) | 21 – Gunn | 8 – Benson | 6 – Enright | Prudential Center (8,257); Newark, NJ |
| January 11, 2025; 3:00 p.m., FS1 | | Xavier | L 63–77 | 9–8 (0–6) | 16 – Gunn | 7 – Gunn | 6 – Enright | Wintrust Arena (5,711); Chicago, IL |
| January 14, 2025; 6:00 p.m., CBSSN | | No. 7 Marquette | L 83–85 ^{OT} | 9–9 (0–7) | 21 – Gunn | 10 – D'amico | 11 – Enright | Wintrust Arena (6,416); Chicago, IL |
| January 17, 2025; 7:10 p.m., CBSSN | | at Georgetown | W 73–68 | 10–9 (1–7) | 17 – Gunn | 7 – Benson | 3 – Tied | Capital One Arena (5,311); Washington, D.C. |
| January 21, 2025; 8:00 p.m., FS1 | | Creighton | L 49–73 | 10–10 (1–8) | 15 – Blocker | 5 – Tied | 3 – Tied | Wintrust Arena (3,729); Chicago, IL |
| January 25, 2025; 3:00 p.m., CBSSN | | at Butler | L 69–86 | 10–11 (1–9) | 20 – Benson | 9 – Benson | 6 – Enright | Hinkle Fieldhouse (8,704); Indianapolis, IN |
| January 29, 2025; 7:00 p.m., Peacock | | at No. 25 UConn | L 61–72 | 10–12 (1–10) | 18 – Blocker | 5 – Tied | 2 – Tied | XL Center (15,684); Hartford, CT |
| February 2, 2025; 5:00 p.m., FS1 | | Seton Hall | W 74–57 | 11–12 (2–10) | 17 – Benson | 11 – Benson | 7 – Blocker | Wintrust Arena (5,003); Chicago, IL |
| February 5, 2025; 8:00 p.m., CBSSN | | Villanova | L 49–59 | 11–13 (2–11) | 16 – Thomas | 6 – Benson | 6 – Blocker | Wintrust Arena (3,789); Chicago, IL |
| February 11, 2025; 7:30 p.m., Peacock | | at No. 18 Marquette | L 58–68 | 11–14 (2–12) | 14 – Gunn | 8 – Benson | 2 – Tied | Fiserv Forum (14,728); Milwaukee, WI |
| February 15, 2025; 11:00 a.m., FS1 | | at Xavier | L 68–85 | 11–15 (2–13) | 16 – Gunn | 5 – Tied | 3 – Rivera | Cintas Center (10,473); Cincinnati, OH |
| February 19, 2025; 8:00 p.m., FS1 | | No. 10 St. John's | L 58–82 | 11–16 (2–14) | 16 – Rivera | 10 – Gunn | 4 – Tied | Wintrust Arena (4,844); Chicago, IL |
| February 22, 2025; 7:00 p.m., FS1 | | Butler | L 72–84 | 11–17 (2–15) | 25 – Blocker | 11 – Tied | 6 – Rivera | Wintrust Arena (5,267); Chicago, IL |
| February 26, 2025; 8:00 p.m., Peacock | | at Creighton | L 65–75 | 11–18 (2–16) | 18 – Rivera | 8 – Rivera | 2 – Tied | CHI Health Center Omaha (17,213); Omaha, NE |
| March 5, 2025; 5:30 p.m., FS1 | | at Providence | W 80–77 | 12–18 (3–16) | 23 – Gunn | 7 – Gunn | 7 – Thomas | Amica Mutual Pavilion (9,169); Providence, RI |
| March 8, 2025; 1:00 p.m., FS1 | | Georgetown | W 83–77 | 13–18 (4–16) | 21 – Rivera | 9 – Rivera | 6 – Tied | Wintrust Arena (5,453); Chicago, IL |
Big East tournament
| March 12, 2025; 5:30 p.m., Peacock | (10) | vs. (7) Georgetown; First round | W 71–67 | 14–18 | 16 – Blocker | 6 – Tied | 6 – Blocker | Madison Square Garden; New York, NY |
| March 13, 2025; 6:00 p.m., FS1 | (10) | vs. (2) Creighton; Quarterfinals | L 81–85 ^{2OT} | 14–19 | 25 – Blocker | 9 – Rivera | 4 – Tied | Madison Square Garden; New York, NY |
College Basketball Crown
| April 1, 2025*; 2:00 p.m., FS1 | (15) | vs. (2) Cincinnati; First round | L 61–83 | 14–20 | 16 – Gunn | 9 – Benson | 2 – Benson | MGM Grand Garden Arena (1,495); Paradise, NV |
*Non-conference game. ^{#}Rankings from AP Poll. (#) Tournament seedings in parentheses. All times are in Central Time.
