= 2024–25 Fordham Rams men's basketball team =

American college basketball season

2024–25 Fordham Rams men's basketball
- Conference: Atlantic 10
- Record: 12–21 (3–15 A–10)
- Head coach: Keith Urgo (3rd season)
- Associate head coach: Tray Woodall
- Assistant coaches: Ronald Ramón; Henry Lowe
- Home arena: Rose Hill Gymnasium

2024–25 Atlantic 10 men's basketball standings
	Conf.				Overall
Team	W		L	PCT	W		L	PCT
VCU †	15	–	3	.833	28	–	7	.800
George Mason	15	–	3	.833	27	–	9	.750
Dayton	12	–	6	.667	23	–	11	.676
Loyola Chicago	12	–	6	.667	25	–	12	.676
Saint Louis	11	–	7	.611	19	–	15	.559
Saint Joseph's	11	–	7	.611	22	–	13	.629
George Washington	9	–	9	.500	21	–	13	.618
St. Bonaventure	9	–	9	.500	22	–	12	.647
Duquesne	8	–	10	.444	13	–	19	.406
Rhode Island	7	–	11	.389	18	–	13	.581
UMass	7	–	11	.389	12	–	20	.375
Davidson	6	–	12	.333	17	–	16	.515
Richmond	5	–	13	.278	10	–	22	.313
La Salle	5	–	13	.278	14	–	19	.424
Fordham	3	–	15	.167	12	–	21	.364
† 2025 A-10 tournament winner

The 2024–25 Fordham Rams men's basketball team represented Fordham University during the 2024–25 NCAA Division I men's basketball season. The Rams, led by third-year head coach Keith Urgo, played their home games at Rose Hill Gymnasium in the Bronx, New York as a member of the Atlantic 10 Conference. They finished the season 12–21, 3–15 in A-10 play to finish in last place. They upset Rhode Island in the A-10 tournament before losing to George Washington.

Following the season, the school fired head coach Keith Urgo. A month later, the school was sanctioned by the NCAA for recruiting violations committed by Urgo. The school was forced to vacate wins across the 2022 and 2023 seasons and was fined and placed on probation for three years. Urgo received a two-year show cause penalty.

On April 3, 2025, the school named UC Riverside head coach Mike Magpayo the team's new head coach.

== Previous season ==
The Rams finished the 2023–24 season 13–20, 6–12 in A-10 play, to finish for a three-way tie for 10th place. As a No. 12 seed in the Atlantic 10 tournament they defeated Davidson in the first round before losing in the second round to VCU.

== Offseason ==
=== Departures ===
Name	Number	Pos.	Height	Weight	Year	Hometown	Reason for departure
Noah Best	4	G	6' 5"	175		The Bronx, NY	Transferred to Fairfield
Angel Montas	5	F	6' 6"	228	Sophomore	La Romana, Dominican Republic	Transferred to Mercer
Kyle Rose	10	G	6' 4"	192	Senior	Upper Marlboro, MD	Graduated
Elijah Gray	12	F	6' 8"	220	Sophomore	Charlotte, NC	Transferred to Temple
Albe Evans	14	G	5' 11"	160	Senior	Schuylkill Haven, PA	Walk-on; left the team due to personal reasons
Ogheneyole Akuwovo	15	F	6' 9"	220	GS Senior	Delta State, Nigeria	Graduated
Antrell Charlton	24	G	6' 5"	205	Senior	Live Oak, FL	Graduated
Wayne Franklin	31	G	6' 1"	185	Sophomore	Paramus, NJ	Walk-on; transferred to Weatherford College

=== Incoming transfers ===
Name	Number	Pos.	Height	Weight	Year	Hometown	Previous school
Jackie Johnson III	15	G	5' 11"	185	Senior	Wichita, KS	UNLV
Matt Zona	25	F	6' 9"	252	GS Senior	Blauvelt, NY	Notre Dame

=== Recruiting classes ===
==== 2024 recruiting class ====
College recruiting information
Name	Hometown	School	Height	Weight	Commit date
Jaden Smith #25 C	Chicago, IL	Kenwood Academy High School	6 ft 10 in (2.08 m)	210 lb (95 kg)	May 9, 2024
Jaden Smith #25 C	Recruit ratings: Rivals: 247Sports: ESPN: (81)				
Ryan Pettis; CG	San Mateo, CA	Junipero Serra High School	6 ft 2 in (1.88 m)	170 lb (77 kg)	Oct 18, 2023
Ryan Pettis; CG	Recruit ratings: No ratings found				
Kingston Price Jr. PG	Severna Park, MD	Severn School	6 ft 1 in (1.85 m)	160 lb (73 kg)	Jul 23, 2024
Kingston Price Jr. PG	Recruit ratings: No ratings found				
Aleksander Pachucki; SG	Toronto, ON	Hoosac School	6 ft 5 in (1.96 m)	180 lb (82 kg)	May 25, 2024
Aleksander Pachucki; SG	Recruit ratings: No ratings found				
Overall recruit ranking:
Note: In many cases, Scout, Rivals, 247Sports, On3, and ESPN may conflict in their listings of height and weight.; In these cases, the average was taken. ESPN grades are on a 100-point scale.; Sources: "2024 Team Ranking". Rivals.

==== 2025 recruiting class ====
College recruiting information (2025)
Name	Hometown	School	Height	Weight	Commit date
Troy Henderson; PG	Richmond, VA	John Marshall High School	6 ft 1 in (1.85 m)	180 lb (82 kg)	Aug 2, 2024
Troy Henderson; PG	Recruit ratings: No ratings found				
Overall recruit ranking:
Note: In many cases, Scout, Rivals, 247Sports, On3, and ESPN may conflict in their listings of height and weight.; In these cases, the average was taken. ESPN grades are on a 100-point scale.; Sources: "2025 Team Ranking". Rivals.

== Roster ==
2024–25 Fordham Rams men's basketball team
Players
Coaches

Pos.	#	Name	Height	Weight	Year	Previous school	Hometown
G	0	Japhet Medor	6 ft 0 in (1.83 m)	165 lb (75 kg)	GS	UTSA	Wellington, FL
G	1	Will Richardson	6 ft 3 in (1.91 m)	170 lb (77 kg)	Jr	Bergen Catholic High School	Teaneck, NJ
F	2	Romad Dean	6 ft 7 in (2.01 m)	210 lb (95 kg)	Jr	Mount Saint Michael Academy	Freeport, Bahamas
G/F	3	Jahmere Tripp	6 ft 6 in (1.98 m)	230 lb (104 kg)	So	Our Saviour Lutheran	Brooklyn, NY
C	4	Jaden Smith	6 ft 11 in (2.11 m)	220 lb (100 kg)	Fr	Kenwood Academy	Chicago, IL
F	5	Joshua Rivera	6 ft 6 in (1.98 m)	215 lb (98 kg)	Jr	Lafayette	New Brunswick, NJ
G	8	Ryan Pettis	6 ft 4 in (1.93 m)	180 lb (82 kg)	Fr	Junípero Serra	East Palo Alto, CA
G	10	Kingston Price	6 ft 2 in (1.88 m)	170 lb (77 kg)	Fr	Severn School	Bowie, MD
G	12	Aleksander Pachucki	6 ft 5 in (1.96 m)	180 lb (82 kg)	Fr	Hoosac School	Toronto, ON
G	13	Zach Riley	6 ft 5 in (1.96 m)	195 lb (88 kg)	Sr	Rangitoto College	Auckland, New Zealand
G	15	Jackie Johnson III	5 ft 11 in (1.8 m)	185 lb (84 kg)	Sr	UNLV	Wichita, KS
G	17	Jameson O'Toole (W)	6 ft 3 in (1.91 m)	180 lb (82 kg)	So	St. Thomas More	Pittsburgh, PA
G	21	Aidan Crotty (W)	5 ft 11 in (1.8 m)	160 lb (73 kg)	Fr	Fairfield Prep	Fairfield, CT
G	22	Brian Nussbaum (W)	6 ft 2 in (1.88 m)	185 lb (84 kg)	Sr	The Winchendon School	South Salem, NY
G	23	Max Miller (W)	6 ft 0 in (1.83 m)	160 lb (73 kg)	Fr	Worcester Academy	Rye, NY
F	25	Matt Zona	6 ft 9 in (2.06 m)	250 lb (113 kg)	GS	Notre Dame	Blauvelt, NY
F	30	Abdou Tsimbila	6 ft 9 in (2.06 m)	245 lb (111 kg)	GS	Penn State	Yaoundé, Cameroon

Head coach

- Keith Urgo (Fairfield)

Assistant coach(es)

- Tray Woodall (Pittsburgh)
- Ronald Ramón (Pittsburgh)
- Henry Lowe (Villanova)

Legend

- (C) Team captain
- (S) Suspended
- (I) Ineligible
- (W) Walk-on
- Injured
- Current redshirt

Roster
Last update: December 31, 2024

== Schedule and results ==
Date time, TV	Rank^{#}	Opponent^{#}	Result	Record	High points	High rebounds	High assists	Site (attendance) city, state
Non-conference regular season
November 4, 2024*; 6:30 p.m., FS1		at St. John's; Rivalry	L 60–92	0–1	23 – Johnson III	6 – Rivera	3 – Richardson	Carnesecca Arena (5,602); Queens, NY
November 9, 2024*; 12:00 p.m., FS2		at Seton Hall	W 57–56	1–1	18 – Johnson III	11 – Tsimbila	4 – Tied	Walsh Gymnasium (1,286); South Orange, NJ
November 12, 2024*; 7:00 p.m., SNY/ESPN+		Binghamton	W 78–63	2–1	23 – Johnson III	5 – Tied	5 – Richardson	Rose Hill Gymnasium (1,349); The Bronx, NY
November 15, 2024*; 7:00 p.m., ESPN+		at Manhattan; Battle of the Bronx	L 76–78	2–2	23 – Medor	8 – Tied	4 – Tied	Draddy Gymnasium (1,504); Riverdale, NY
November 19, 2024*; 7:00 p.m., ESPN+		Georgian Court	W 101–61	3–2	14 – Tied	13 – Smith	5 – Richardson	Rose Hill Gymnasium (661); The Bronx, NY
November 22, 2024*; 7:00 p.m., ESPN+		Drexel; Sunshine Slam campus-site game	L 71–73	3–3	18 – Johnson III	8 – Tied	5 – Medor	Rose Hill Gymnasium (1,237); The Bronx, NY
November 25, 2024*; 4:00 p.m., CBSSN		vs. Penn State; Sunshine Slam Beach Division semifinals	L 66–85	3–4	15 – Tied	9 – Dean	3 – Tied	Ocean Center; Daytona Beach, FL
November 26, 2024*; 1:30 p.m., CBSSN		vs. San Francisco; Sunshine Slam Beach Division consolation game	L 64–85	3–5	17 – Johnson III	7 – Riley	3 – Tied	Ocean Center; Daytona Beach, FL
December 1, 2024*; 2:00 p.m., ESPN+		New Hampshire	W 83–61	4–5	16 – Johnson III	7 – Dean	5 – Tripp	Rose Hill Gymnasium (1,069); The Bronx, NY
December 4, 2024*; 7:00 p.m., SNY/ESPN+		Fairleigh Dickinson	W 84–75	5–5	21 – Johnson III	10 – Tripp	5 – Tied	Rose Hill Gymnasium (1,146); The Bronx, NY
December 8, 2024*; 12:00 p.m., YES/ESPN+		Maine	W 87–72	6–5	16 – Tied	8 – Tsimbila	6 – Johnson III	Rose Hill Gymnasium (1,679); The Bronx, NY
December 14, 2024*; 2:30 p.m., CBSSN		vs. Bryant; Basketball Hall of Fame Showcase	W 86–84	7–5	29 – Johnson III	5 – Tied	4 – Medor	Mohegan Sun Arena (2,145); Uncasville, CT
December 21, 2024*; 2:00 p.m., ESPN+		Albany	W 87–83	8–5	15 – Zona	6 – Tripp	9 – Medor	Rose Hill Gymnasium (1,412); The Bronx, NY
Atlantic 10 regular season
December 31, 2024; 2:00 p.m., SNY/ESPN+		Saint Louis	L 63–88	8–6 (0–1)	14 – Johnson III	9 – Tsimbila	4 – Medor	Rose Hill Gymnasium (1,685); The Bronx, NY
January 4, 2025; 2:00 p.m., SNY/ESPN+		St. Bonaventure	L 66–86	8–7 (0–2)	21 – Johnson III	6 – Dean	5 – Medor	Rose Hill Gymnasium (2,850); The Bronx, NY
January 8, 2025; 7:00 p.m., ESPN+		at VCU	L 61–73	8–8 (0–3)	19 – Medor	6 – Tied	4 – Medor	Siegel Center (0 (Note: Game was played without spectators in attendance due to the January 2025 Richmond water outage.)); Richmond, VA
January 11, 2025; 2:00 p.m., ESPN+		at Davidson	L 64–74	8–9 (0–4)	20 – Tied	10 – Dean	5 – Medor	John M. Belk Arena (3,053); Davidson, NC
January 15, 2025; 7:00 p.m., SNY/ESPN+		UMass	L 118–120 ^{3OT}	8–10 (0–5)	36 – Johnson III	9 – Tied	5 – Medor	Rose Hill Gymnasium (1,781); The Bronx, NY
January 22, 2025; 8:00 p.m., ESPN+		at Loyola Chicago	L 66–70	8–11 (0–6)	22 – Tied	5 – Dean	6 – Medor	Joseph J. Gentile Arena (2,780); Chicago, IL
January 26, 2025; 12:30 p.m., USA		Duquesne	W 65–63	9–11 (1–6)	16 – Rivera	7 – Tsimbila	7 – Medor	Rose Hill Gymnasium (1,651); The Bronx, NY
January 29, 2025; 7:00 p.m., Peacock		at La Salle	W 88–72	10–11 (2–6)	15 – Dean	10 – Rivera	7 – Johnson III	Tom Gola Arena (1,435); Philadelphia, PA
February 1, 2025; 12:30 p.m., USA		at St. Bonaventure	L 72–74	10–12 (2–7)	20 – Johnson III	8 – Dean	4 – Tripp	Reilly Center (4,850); St. Bonaventure, NY
February 5, 2025; 7:00 p.m., SNY/ESPN+		Rhode Island	W 80–79	11–12 (3–7)	25 – Johnson	9 – Dean	6 – Medor	Rose Hill Gymnasium (1,309); The Bronx, NY
February 12, 2025; 7:00 p.m., ESPN+		Dayton	L 76–93	11–13 (3–8)	24 – Johnson III	8 – Zona	4 – Tied	Rose Hill Gymnasium (1,651); The Bronx, NY
February 15, 2025; 6:00 p.m., ESPN+		at Richmond	L 66–70	11–14 (3–9)	24 – Medor	12 – Tsimbila	2 – Tied	Robins Center (6,226); Richmond, VA
February 19, 2025; 7:00 p.m., ESPN+		at Duquesne	L 64–73	11–15 (3–10)	20 – Johnson III	7 – Dean	8 – Medor	UPMC Cooper Fieldhouse (2,485); Pittsburgh, PA
February 22, 2025; 2:00 p.m., ESPN+		Davidson	L 69–80	11–16 (3–11)	21 – Johnson III	10 – Tripp	6 – Medor	Rose Hill Gymnasium (2,221); The Bronx, NY
February 26, 2025; 7:00 p.m., ESPN+		at George Mason	L 64–74	11–17 (3–12)	22 – Medor	10 – Tsimbila	4 – Medor	EagleBank Arena (3,385); Fairfax, VA
March 1, 2025; 12:00 p.m., USA		Saint Joseph's	L 76–90	11–18 (3–13)	18 – Johnson III	8 – Dean	5 – Medor	Rose Hill Gymnasium (2,291); The Bronx, NY
March 5, 2025; 7:00 p.m., SNY/ESPN+		George Washington	L 58–81	11–19 (3–14)	19 – Johnson III	12 – Tsimbila	4 – Medor	Rose Hill Gymnasium (1,134); The Bronx, NY
March 8, 2025; 2:00 p.m., ESPN+		at Rhode Island	L 67–84	11–20 (3–15)	19 – Johnson III	6 – Tied	2 – Tripp	Ryan Center (5,489); Kingston, RI
Atlantic 10 tournament
March 12, 2025; 2:00 p.m., USA	(15)	vs. (10) Rhode Island; First round	W 88–71	12–20	29 – Johnson III	7 – Tied	5 – Zona	Capital One Arena; Washington, D.C.
March 13, 2025; 5:00 p.m., USA	(15)	vs. (7) George Washington; Second round	L 81–88	12–21	35 – Johnson III	8 – Tsimbila	4 – Medor	Capital One Arena; Washington, D.C.
*Non-conference game. ^{#}Rankings from AP poll. (#) Tournament seedings in parentheses. All times are in Eastern.
