= 2024–25 Butler Bulldogs men's basketball team =

American college basketball season

2024–25 Butler Bulldogs men's basketball

Arizona Tip-Off (Cactus Division) champions

College Basketball Crown, Quarterfinals
- Conference: Big East Conference
- Record: 15–20 (6–14 Big East)
- Head coach: Thad Matta (3rd, 4th overall season)
- Assistant coaches: Mike Pegues (3rd season); Maurice Joseph (3rd season); Alex Barlow (2nd season); Jon Diebler (1st season); Connor McCaffery (1st season)
- Home arena: Hinkle Fieldhouse

2024–25 Big East men's basketball standings
	Conf.				Overall
Team	W		L	PCT	W		L	PCT
No. 11 St. John's †	18	–	2	.900	31	–	5	.861
Creighton	15	–	5	.750	25	–	11	.694
UConn	14	–	6	.700	24	–	11	.686
Xavier	13	–	7	.650	22	–	12	.647
Marquette	13	–	7	.650	23	–	11	.676
Villanova	11	–	9	.550	21	–	15	.583
Georgetown	8	–	12	.400	18	–	16	.529
Providence	6	–	14	.300	12	–	20	.375
Butler	6	–	14	.300	15	–	20	.429
DePaul	4	–	16	.200	14	–	20	.412
Seton Hall	2	–	18	.100	7	–	25	.219
† 2025 Big East tournament winner Rankings from AP Poll

The 2024–25 Butler Bulldogs men's basketball team represented Butler University in the 2024–25 NCAA Division I men's basketball season. They were led by Thad Matta, in the third year of his second stint as head coach of his alma mater. The Bulldogs played their home games at Hinkle Fieldhouse in Indianapolis, Indiana, as members of the Big East Conference.

== Previous season ==
The Bulldogs finished the 2023–24 season 18–15, 9–11 in Big East play to finish in eighth place. They were defeated by Xavier in the first round of the Big East tournament. They received an at-large bid to the NIT where they lost in the first round to Minnesota.

== Offseason ==
=== Departures ===
Name	Number	Pos.	Height	Weight	Year	Hometown	Reason for departure
Jalen Thomas	1	F/C	6'10"	240	GS Senior	Detroit, MI	Graduated
Artemios Gavalas	2	G	6'0"	180	(redshirt) Junior	Southampton, NY	Walk-on; transferred to Mansfield
DJ Davis	4	G	6'1"	175	Senior	Moreno Valley, CA	Graduate transferred to Washington
Posh Alexander	5	G	6'0"	205	Senior	Brooklyn, NY	Graduate transferred to Dayton
Connor Turnbull	22	F	6'10"	220	Sophomore	St. Paul, MO	Transferred to Evansville
John-Michael Mulloy	35	F/C	6'10"	235	(redshirt) Senior	Carmel, IN	Graduated

=== Incoming transfers ===
Name	Number	Pos.	Height	Weight	Year	Hometown	Previous school	Seasons Remaining
Jamie Kaiser	7	G	6'6"	205	Sophomore	Burke, VA	Maryland	Three
Kolby King	12	G	6'2"	175	Junior	Pembroke Pines, FL	Tulane	Two
Patrick McCaffery	22	F	6'9"	210	GS Senior	Iowa City, IA	Iowa	One

=== Recruiting classes ===
==== 2024 recruiting class ====
College recruiting
Name	Hometown	School	Height	Weight	Commit date
Colt Langdon; PF	Raleigh, NC	Millbrook High School	6 ft 7 in (2.01 m)	210 lb (95 kg)	Jul 10, 2024
Colt Langdon; PF	Recruit ratings: Rivals: 247Sports: ESPN: (79)				
Evan Haywood; SG	Indianapolis, IN	Brebeuf Jesuit Preparatory School	6 ft 4 in (1.93 m)	180 lb (82 kg)	Aug 13, 2023
Evan Haywood; SG	Recruit ratings: Rivals: 247Sports: ESPN: (NR)				
Overall recruit ranking:
Note: In many cases, Scout, Rivals, 247Sports, On3, and ESPN may conflict in their listings of height and weight.; In these cases, the average was taken. ESPN grades are on a 100-point scale.; Sources: "ESPN – Butler Bulldogs Men's Basketball Recruiting". ESPN.

==== 2025 recruiting class ====
College recruiting (2025)
Name	Hometown	School	Height	Weight	Commit date
Jack McCaffery #15 PF	Iowa City, IA	West High School	6 ft 8 in (2.03 m)	205 lb (93 kg)	Jul 29, 2024
Jack McCaffery #15 PF	Recruit ratings: Rivals: 247Sports: ESPN: (82)				
Azavier Robinson #16 PG	Indianapolis, IN	Lawrence North High School	6 ft 1 in (1.85 m)	175 lb (79 kg)	Aug 3, 2024
Azavier Robinson #16 PG	Recruit ratings: Rivals: 247Sports: ESPN: (82)				
Jackson Keith; SF	Durham, NC	Southern Durham High School	6 ft 6 in (1.98 m)	190 lb (86 kg)	Sep 21, 2024
Jackson Keith; SF	Recruit ratings: Rivals: 247Sports: ESPN: (81)				
Efeosa Oliogu; SF	Toronto, ON	Overtime Elite	6 ft 5 in (1.96 m)	200 lb (91 kg)	Jan 13, 2025
Efeosa Oliogu; SF	Recruit ratings: Rivals: 247Sports: ESPN: (78)				
Overall recruit ranking:
Note: In many cases, Scout, Rivals, 247Sports, On3, and ESPN may conflict in their listings of height and weight.; In these cases, the average was taken. ESPN grades are on a 100-point scale.; Sources: "ESPN – Butler Bulldogs Men's Basketball Recruiting". ESPN.

== Roster ==
2024–25 Butler Bulldogs men's basketball team
Players
Coaches

Pos.	#	Name	Height	Weight	Year	Previous school	Hometown
F	22	Patrick McCaffery	6 ft 9 in (2.06 m)	215 lb (98 kg)	GS	Iowa	Iowa City, IA
C	23	Andre Screen	7 ft 1 in (2.16 m)	260 lb (118 kg)	GS	Bucknell	Alexandria, VA
F	11	Jahmyl Telfort	6 ft 7 in (2.01 m)	225 lb (102 kg)	GS	Northeastern	Boucherville, QC
F	21	Pierre Brooks II	6 ft 6 in (1.98 m)	240 lb (109 kg)	Sr	Michigan State	Detroit, MI
G	12	Kolby King	6 ft 2 in (1.88 m)	185 lb (84 kg)	Jr	Tulane	Pembroke Pines, FL
G	14	Landon Moore	6 ft 3 in (1.91 m)	200 lb (91 kg)	Jr	Saint Francis (PA)	Bloomington, IL
G	13	Finley Bizjack	6 ft 4 in (1.93 m)	190 lb (86 kg)	So	Byron Nelson	Trophy Club, TX
F	0	Augusto Cassia	6 ft 8 in (2.03 m)	220 lb (100 kg)	So	NBA Global Academy	Salvador, Brazil
G/F	7	Jamie Kaiser Jr. (injured) (redshirt)	6 ft 6 in (1.98 m)	205 lb (93 kg)	So	Maryland	Burke, VA
F/C	33	Boden Kapke	6 ft 11 in (2.11 m)	255 lb (116 kg)	So	Holy Family Catholic	Victoria, MN
G	3	Ethan McComb (W)	6 ft 1 in (1.85 m)	185 lb (84 kg)	So	Center Grove	Greenwood, IN
G	5	Ryder Cate (W) (redshirt)	6 ft 5 in (1.96 m)	175 lb (79 kg)	Fr	Richmond	Richmond, IN
G	1	Evan Haywood	6 ft 4 in (1.93 m)	195 lb (88 kg)	Fr	Brebeuf Jesuit	Carmel, IN
F	45	Colt Langdon (redshirt)	6 ft 7 in (2.01 m)	225 lb (102 kg)	Fr	Millbrook	Raleigh, NC
G	25	Connor O'Guinn (W) (redshirt)	6 ft 2 in (1.88 m)	165 lb (75 kg)	Fr	Bloomington North	Bloomington, IN

Head coach

- Thad Matta (Butler)

Assistant coach(es)

- Mike Pegues (Delaware)
- Maurice Joseph (Vermont)
- Alex Barlow (Butler)
- Jon Diebler (Ohio State)
- Connor McCaffery (Iowa)

Legend

- (C) Team captain
- (S) Suspended
- (I) Ineligible
- (W) Walk-on
- Injured
- Current redshirt

Roster

== Schedule and results ==
Date time, TV	Rank^{#}	Opponent^{#}	Result	Record	High points	High rebounds	High assists	Site (attendance) city, state
Exhibition
October 30, 2024*; 7:30 p.m.		Illinois Wesleyan	W 88–47	–	13 – Tied	10 – Tied	4 – Telfort	Hinkle Fieldhouse (5,844); Indianapolis, IN
Non-conference regular season
November 4, 2024*; 6:45 p.m., FS1		Missouri State	W 72–65	1–0	29 – Telfort	8 – Screen	3 – Tied	Hinkle Fieldhouse (7,887); Indianapolis, IN
November 8, 2024*; 6:30 p.m., FS2		Austin Peay	L 66–68	1–1	23 – McCaffery	8 – McCaffery	6 – Bizjack	Hinkle Fieldhouse (7,193); Indianapolis, IN
November 11, 2024*; 7:00 p.m., FS1		Western Michigan	W 85–65	2–1	20 – Brooks	9 – Bizjack	6 – Brooks	Hinkle Fieldhouse (6,855); Indianapolis, IN
November 15, 2024*; 7:00 p.m., FS2		SMU	W 81–70	3–1	19 – Telfort	9 – Screen	5 – Telfort	Hinkle Fieldhouse (7,798); Indianapolis, IN
November 22, 2024*; 7:00 p.m., FS2		Merrimack	W 78–39	4–1	23 – Brooks	12 – Brooks	7 – King	Hinkle Fieldhouse (6,823); Indianapolis, IN
November 28, 2024*; 7:00 p.m., CBSSN		vs. Northwestern; Arizona Tip-Off Cactus Division semifinals	W 71–69	5–1	23 – Telfort	9 – Screen	5 – Telfort	Mullett Arena; Tempe, AZ
November 29, 2024*; 9:30 p.m., CBSSN		vs. No. 25 Mississippi State; Arizona Tip-Off Cactus Division championship	W 87–77	6–1	24 – Telfort	9 – Tied	4 – Screen	Mullett Arena (1,978); Tempe, AZ
December 3, 2024*; 6:30 p.m., FS2		Eastern Illinois	W 73–58	7–1	20 – Tied	9 – King	3 – Tied	Hinkle Fieldhouse (6,886); Indianapolis, IN
December 7, 2024*; 5:30 p.m., ESPN2		at No. 17 Houston; Big East–Big 12 Battle	L 51–79	7–2	11 – Tied	6 – King	3 – Telfort	Fertitta Center (7,035); Houston, TX
December 10, 2024*; 6:30 p.m., FS1		North Dakota State	L 68–71	7–3	26 – Brooks	7 – Brooks	4 – Tied	Hinkle Fieldhouse (6,980); Indianapolis, IN
December 14, 2024*; 2:30 p.m., BTN		vs. No. 20 Wisconsin; Indy Classic	L 74–83	7–4	23 – Brooks	7 – Tied	3 – McCaffery	Gainbridge Fieldhouse (15,045); Indianapolis, IN
Big East regular season
December 18, 2024; 9:00 p.m., FS1		at No. 9 Marquette	L 70–80	7–5 (0–1)	16 – Tied	10 – Telfort	4 – Telfort	Fiserv Forum (15,770); Milwaukee, WI
December 21, 2024; 12:00 p.m., Peacock		No. 11 UConn	L 74–78	7–6 (0–2)	17 – Tied	10 – Screen	7 – Telfort	Hinkle Fieldhouse (9,100); Indianapolis, IN
January 1, 2025; 6:30 p.m., FS1		Villanova	L 65–73	7–7 (0–3)	25 – Telfort	10 – Telfort	6 – Telfort	Hinkle Fieldhouse (8,284); Indianapolis, IN
January 4, 2025; 2:00 p.m., FS1		at St. John's	L 62–70	7–8 (0–4)	17 – Brooks	11 – McCaffery	5 – King	Carnesecca Arena (5,602); Queens, NY
January 8, 2025; 8:30 p.m., Peacock		at Providence	L 65–84	7–9 (0–5)	17 – Tied	6 – King	3 – Screen	Amica Mutual Pavilion (8,111); Providence, RI
January 11, 2025; 12:00 p.m., FOX		Creighton	L 76–80	7–10 (0–6)	21 – McCaffery	7 – Tied	5 – Telfort	Hinkle Fieldhouse (8,134); Indianapolis, IN
January 15, 2025; 7:00 p.m., FS1		Seton Hall	W 82–77	8–10 (1–6)	19 – Brooks	7 – McCaffery	4 – Tied	Hinkle Fieldhouse (6,607); Indianapolis, IN
January 21, 2025; 7:00 p.m., FS1		at No. 19 UConn	L 78–80 ^{OT}	8–11 (1–7)	25 – Telfort	9 – Screen	2 – Tied	XL Center (15,684); Hartford, CT
January 25, 2025; 4:00 p.m., CBSSN		DePaul	W 86–69	9–11 (2–7)	29 – Brooks	13 – Brooks	5 – McCaffery	Hinkle Fieldhouse (8,704); Indianapolis, IN
January 28, 2025; 8:30 p.m., FS1		No. 9 Marquette	L 69–78	9–12 (2–8)	24 – Telfort	9 – Screen	5 – Tied	Hinkle Fieldhouse (7,423); Indianapolis, IN
January 31, 2025; 6:30 p.m., FS1		at Georgetown	L 70–73	9–13 (2–9)	17 – Bizjack	7 – McCaffery	5 – Bizjack	Capital One Arena (6,729); Washington, D.C.
February 5, 2025; 6:30 p.m., FS1		at Seton Hall	W 84–54	10–13 (3–9)	14 – Brooks	11 – Kapke	7 – Brooks	Prudential Center (8,634); Newark, NJ
February 8, 2025; 3:00 p.m., Peacock		Providence	W 82–81	11–13 (4–9)	24 – Telfort	10 – Screen	4 – Tied	Hinkle Fieldhouse (8,312); Indianapolis, IN
February 15, 2025; 2:05 p.m., FS1		Georgetown	W 97–86	12–13 (5–9)	30 – Brooks	6 – Moore	5 – Tied	Hinkle Fieldhouse (8,844); Indianapolis, IN
February 18, 2025; 8:00 p.m., Peacock		at Xavier	L 63–76	12–14 (5–10)	20 – Telfort	13 – Kapke	4 – King	Cintas Center (10,023); Cincinnati, OH
February 22, 2025; 8:00 p.m., FS1		at DePaul	W 84–72	13–14 (6–10)	24 – Brooks	8 – King	6 – Telfort	Wintrust Arena (5,267); Chicago, IL
February 26, 2025; 9:00 p.m., CBSSN		No. 7 St. John's	L 70–76	13–15 (6–11)	13 – Telfort	7 – Telfort	4 – Bizjack	Hinkle Fieldhouse (7,086); Indianapolis, IN
March 1, 2025; 12:00 p.m., FOX		at Villanova	L 70–80	13–16 (6–12)	16 – Tied	8 – Screen	4 – Bizjack	Finneran Pavilion (6,501); Villanova, PA
March 5, 2025; 7:00 p.m., CBSSN		Xavier	L 78–91	13–17 (6–13)	20 – Telfort	6 – Telfort	3 – Tied	Hinkle Fieldhouse (8,225); Indianapolis, IN
March 8, 2025; 6:00 p.m., FS1		at Creighton	L 74–87	13–18 (6–14)	19 – Tied	7 – Brooks II	6 – Telfort	CHI Health Center Omaha (17,907); Omaha, NE
Big East tournament
March 12, 2025; 4:00 p.m., Peacock	(9)	vs. (8) Providence; First round	W 75–69	14–18	25 – Brooks	7 – Brooks	3 – Tied	Madison Square Garden; New York, NY
March 13, 2025; 12:00 p.m., Peacock	(9)	vs. (1) No. 6 St. John's; Quarterfinal	L 57–78	14–19	16 – McCaffery	6 – Kapke	3 – Telfort	Madison Square Garden; New York, NY
College Basketball Crown
March 31, 2025*; 3:00 p.m., FS1		vs. Utah; First round	W 86–84	15–19	22 – Brooks	9 – Brooks	3 – Tied	MGM Grand Garden Arena (2,119); Paradise, NV
April 2, 2025*; 7:00 p.m., FS1		vs. Boise State; Quarterfinals	L 93–100	15–20	30 – Bizjack	5 – Tied	7 – Bizjack	MGM Grand Garden Arena (2,512); Paradise, NV
*Non-conference game. ^{#}Rankings from AP Poll. (#) Tournament seedings in parentheses. All times are in Eastern Time.

== See also ==
2024–25 Butler Bulldogs women's basketball team
