= 2024–25 Xavier Musketeers men's basketball team =

American college basketball season

2024–25 Xavier Musketeers men's basketball

NCAA tournament, First Round
- Conference: Big East Conference
- Record: 22–12 (13–7 Big East)
- Head coach: Sean Miller (3rd, 8th overall season)
- Associate head coach: Adam Cohen (3rd season)
- Assistant coaches: Dante Jackson (7th season); David Miller (3rd season)
- Home arena: Cintas Center

2024–25 Big East men's basketball standings
	Conf.				Overall
Team	W		L	PCT	W		L	PCT
No. 11 St. John's †	18	–	2	.900	31	–	5	.861
Creighton	15	–	5	.750	25	–	11	.694
UConn	14	–	6	.700	24	–	11	.686
Xavier	13	–	7	.650	22	–	12	.647
Marquette	13	–	7	.650	23	–	11	.676
Villanova	11	–	9	.550	21	–	15	.583
Georgetown	8	–	12	.400	18	–	16	.529
Providence	6	–	14	.300	12	–	20	.375
Butler	6	–	14	.300	15	–	20	.429
DePaul	4	–	16	.200	14	–	20	.412
Seton Hall	2	–	18	.100	7	–	25	.219
† 2025 Big East tournament winner Rankings from AP Poll

The 2024–25 Xavier Musketeers men's basketball team represented Xavier University during the 2024–25 NCAA Division I men's basketball season as a member of the Big East Conference. Led by Sean Miller in the third and final season of his second stint after coaching the Musketeers from 2004 to 2009, they played their home games at the Cintas Center in Cincinnati, Ohio. They finished the season 22–13, 13–7 in Big East play to finish in a tie for fourth place. As the No. 4 seed in the Big East tournament, they lost Marquette in the quarterfinals. They received an at-large bid to the NCAA tournament as a No. 11 seed in the Midwest region. They defeated Texas in the First Four before losing to Illinois in the round of 64.

On March 24, 2025, Sean Miller left the school for a second time as he was named the head coach of Texas. Two days later, the school named New Mexico head coach Richard Pitino the team's new head coach.

== Previous season ==
The Musketeers finished the 2023–24 season 16–18, 9–11 in Big East play, to finish in a tie for eighth place. In the Big East tournament, they defeated Butler in the first round before losing in the quarterfinals to UConn. The team received an at-large bid to the NIT in the Wake Forest Bracket, where lost in the first round to Georgia.

== Offseason ==
=== Departures ===
Name	Number	Pos.	Height	Weight	Year	Hometown	Reason for departure
Desmond Claude	1	G	6'6"	203	Sophomore	New Haven, CT	Transferred to USC
Quincy Olivari	8	G	6'3"	200	Senior	Atlanta, GA	Graduated/undrafted in 2024 NBA draft; signed with the Los Angeles Lakers
Reid Ducharme	11	G/F	6'7"	195	Freshman	Milton, MA	Transferred to Siena
Kam Craft	12	F	6'6"	211	Sophomore	Buffalo Grove, IL	Transferred to Miami (OH)
Kachi Nzeh	15	C	6'8"	230	Freshman	Upper Darby, PA	Transferred to Penn State
Lazar Đjoković	17	F	6'10"	230	Freshman	Gornji Milanovac, Serbia	Transferred to College of Charleston
Saša Ciani	21	F	6'9"	240	Sophomore	Šempeter pri Gorici, Slovenia	Transferred to UIC
Abou Ousmane	24	F	6'10"	230	Senior	Brooklyn, NY	Graduate transferred to Oklahoma State
Gytis Nemeikša	50	F	6'7"	203	Freshman	Kaunas, Lithuania	Transferred to Hawaii

=== Incoming transfers ===
Name	Num	Pos.	Height	Weight	Year	Hometown	Previous school
Marcus Foster	1	G	6'4"	200	GS Senior	Atlanta, GA	Furman
John Hugley IV	4	F/C	6'10"	275	(redshirt) Senior	Cleveland, OH	Oklahoma
Lassina Traoré	6	F	6'10"	230	Senior	Abidjan, Côte d'Ivoire	Long Beach State
Ryan Conwell	7	G	6'4"	195	Junior	Indianapolis, IN	Indiana State
Roddie Anderson III	8	G	6'3"	190	Junior	Huntington Beach, CA	Boise State
Cam'Ron Fletcher	11	G	6'7"	220	GS Senior	St. Louis, MO	Florida State
Dante Maddox Jr.	21	G	6'2'	195	Senior	Chicago Heights, IL	Toledo

=== Recruiting classes ===
==== 2024 recruiting class ====
There were no incoming recruits for the class of 2024.

== Roster ==
2024–25 Xavier Musketeers men's basketball team
Players
Coaches

Pos.	#	Name	Height	Weight	Year	Previous school	Hometown
G	0	Trey Green (injured)	6 ft 0 in (1.83 m)	168 lb (76 kg)	So	Prolific Prep (CA)	Charlotte, NC
G	1	Marcus Foster	6 ft 5 in (1.96 m)	215 lb (98 kg)	GS	Furman	Atlanta, GA
F	2	Jerome Hunter	6 ft 8 in (2.03 m)	216 lb (98 kg)	GS	Indiana	Columbus, OH
G/F	3	Dailyn Swain	6 ft 7 in (2.01 m)	200 lb (91 kg)	So	Columbus Africentric Early College	Columbus, OH
F	4	John Hugley IV	6 ft 11 in (2.11 m)	260 lb (118 kg)	RS Sr	Oklahoma	Cleveland, OH
F	6	Lassina Traoré (injured)	6 ft 10 in (2.08 m)	240 lb (109 kg)	Sr	Long Beach State	Abidjan, Côte d'Ivoire
G	7	Ryan Conwell	6 ft 3 in (1.91 m)	210 lb (95 kg)	Jr	Indiana State	Indianapolis, IN
G	8	Roddie Anderson III	6 ft 3 in (1.91 m)	190 lb (86 kg)	Jr	Boise State	Huntington Beach, CA
G	11	Cam'Ron Fletcher	6 ft 7 in (2.01 m)	230 lb (104 kg)	GS	Florida State	St. Louis, MO
F	19	Henry Thole (W)	6 ft 7 in (2.01 m)	215 lb (98 kg)	Fr	Villa Madonna Academy	Union, KY
G	20	Dayvion McKnight	6 ft 0 in (1.83 m)	195 lb (88 kg)	GS	Western Kentucky	Shelbyville, KY
G	21	Dante Maddox Jr.	6 ft 2 in (1.88 m)	200 lb (91 kg)	Sr	Toledo	Chicago Heights, IL
G	25	Michael Wolf (W)	6 ft 0 in (1.83 m)	185 lb (84 kg)	Jr	Bridgton Academy	Greenwood Village, CO
F	31	Ian Sabourin (W)	6 ft 4 in (1.93 m)	210 lb (95 kg)	Jr	Badin HS	Hamilton, OH
F	32	Zach Freemantle	6 ft 9 in (2.06 m)	227 lb (103 kg)	GS	Bergen Catholic HS	Teaneck, NJ
G	35	Bob Nunge (W)	6 ft 6 in (1.98 m)	190 lb (86 kg)	Sr	Castle HS	Newburgh, IN
G	45	Brad Colbert (W)	6 ft 2 in (1.88 m)	200 lb (91 kg)	Sr	Louisville	Loveland, OH

Head coach

- Sean Miller (Pittsburgh)

Assistant coach(es)

- Adam Cohen (Arizona)
- Dante Jackson (Xavier)
- David Miller (Arizona)

Legend

- (C) Team captain
- (S) Suspended
- (I) Ineligible
- (W) Walk-on
- Injured
- Current redshirt

Roster

== Schedule and results ==
Date time, TV	Rank^{#}	Opponent^{#}	Result	Record	High points	High rebounds	High assists	Site (attendance) city, state
Exhibition
October 20, 2024*; 5:00 p.m., BSOH		at Dayton; Blackburn/McCafferty Trophy	W 98–74		17 – Freemantle	7 – Maddox Jr.	4 – Tied	UD Arena (13,407); Dayton, OH
Non-conference regular season
November 4, 2024*; 7:30 p.m., FS1		Texas Southern	W 78–69	1–0	21 – Conwell	11 – Freemantle	5 – Tied	Cintas Center (10,212); Cincinnati, OH
November 8, 2024*; 6:00 p.m., FS1		IU Indy	W 94–80	2–0	19 – Conwell	8 – Swain	5 – McKnight	Cintas Center (10,224); Cincinnati, OH
November 12, 2024*; 8:30 p.m., FS1		Jackson State	W 94–57	3–0	21 – Freemantle	10 – Swain	8 – Foster	Cintas Center (10,107); Cincinnati, OH
November 16, 2024*; 12:00 p.m., FS1		Wake Forest; Skip Prosser Classic	W 75–60	4–0	21 – Conwell	6 – Tied	4 – Tied	Cintas Center (10,455); Cincinnati, OH
November 20, 2024*; 6:30 p.m., FS1		Siena; Fort Myers Tip-Off campus site game	W 80–55	5–0	16 – Conwell	9 – Freemantle	7 – McKnight	Cintas Center (10,067); Cincinnati, OH
November 25, 2024*; 8:30 p.m., FS1	No. 22	vs. South Carolina; Fort Myers Tip-Off Beach Division Semifinal	W 75–66	6–0	16 – Freemantle	9 – Freemantle	3 – McKnight	Suncoast Credit Union Arena (3,500); Fort Myers, FL
November 27, 2024*; 8:30 p.m., FS1	No. 22	vs. Michigan; Fort Myers Tip-Off Beach Division Championship	L 53–78	6–1	19 – Conwell	10 – Freemantle	2 – McKnight	Suncoast Credit Union Arena (3,500); Fort Myers, FL
December 1, 2024*; 4:30 p.m., FS1	No. 22	South Carolina State	W 71–68	7–1	17 – Freemantle	7 – Freemantle	5 – McKnight	Cintas Center (9,512); Cincinnati, OH
December 5, 2024*; 8:00 p.m., ESPN+		at TCU; Big East–Big 12 Battle	L 72–76	7–2	17 – Conwell	6 – Tied	6 – Conwell	Schollmaier Arena (5,156); Fort Worth, TX
December 10, 2024*; 7:00 p.m., CBSSN		Morgan State	W 119–58	8–2	27 – Freemantle	10 – Freemantle	4 – Tied	Cintas Center (9,840); Cincinnati, OH
December 14, 2024*; 2:00 p.m., ESPN+		at No. 22 Cincinnati; Crosstown Shootout	L 65–68	8–3	18 – Freemantle	8 – Hunter	9 – McKnight	Fifth Third Arena (12,513); Cincinnati, OH
Big East regular season
December 18, 2024; 7:00 p.m., FS1		at No. 11 UConn	L 89–94 ^{OT}	8–4 (0–1)	23 – Conwell	4 – Tied	3 – McKnight	XL Center (15,684); Hartford, CT
December 21, 2024; 12:00 p.m., FOX		No. 9 Marquette	L 70–72	8–5 (0–2)	16 – Foster	10 – Swain	6 – McKnight	Cintas Center (10,452); Cincinnati, OH
December 31, 2024; 2:00 p.m., Peacock		Seton Hall	W 94–72	9–5 (1–2)	22 – Conwell	6 – Foster	6 – McKnight	Cintas Center (10,212); Cincinnati, OH
January 3, 2025; 8:10 p.m., CBSSN		at Georgetown	L 63–69	9–6 (1–3)	16 – Freemantle	7 – Freemantle	4 – McKnight	Capital One Arena (6,640); Washington, D.C.
January 7, 2025; 6:30 p.m., FS1		St. John's	L 72–82	9–7 (1–4)	22 – Freemantle	8 – Swain	8 – McKnight	Cintas Center (9,328); Cincinnati, OH
January 11, 2025; 4:00 p.m., FS1		at DePaul	W 77–63	10–7 (2–4)	20 – Freemantle	10 – Freemantle	4 – Tied	Wintrust Arena (5,711); Chicago, IL
January 14, 2025; 6:30 p.m., FS1		Villanova	W 69–63	11–7 (3–4)	34 – Conwell	9 – Freemantle	4 – Tied	Cintas Center (10,077); Cincinnati, OH
January 18, 2025; 2:00 p.m., FOX		at No. 7 Marquette	W 59–57	12–7 (4–4)	14 – Freemantle	10 – Freemantle	5 – McKnight	Fiserv Forum (17,881); Milwaukee, WI
January 22, 2025; 7:00 p.m., FS1		at No. 20 St. John's	L 71–79 ^{OT}	12–8 (4–5)	21 – Conwell	7 – Foster	6 – McKnight	Madison Square Garden (14,545); New York, NY
January 25, 2025; 8:00 p.m., FOX		No. 19 UConn	W 76–72	13–8 (5–5)	15 – Tied	7 – Foster	4 – Swain	Cintas Center (10,613); Cincinnati, OH
January 29, 2025; 8:00 p.m., FS1		at Creighton	L 77–86	13–9 (5–6)	20 – Conwell	6 – Tied	3 – Tied	CHI Health Center Omaha (17,056); Omaha, NE
February 4, 2025; 8:42 p.m, FS1		Georgetown	W 74–69	14–9 (6–6)	18 – Swain	13 – Foster	4 – Tied	Cintas Center (10,212); Cincinnati, OH
February 9, 2025; 12:00 p.m., FS1		at Villanova	L 68–80	14–10 (6–7)	24 – Maddox Jr.	6 – Foster	5 – Conwell	Wells Fargo Center (8,462); Philadelphia, PA
February 12, 2025; 8:00 p.m., Peacock		at Providence	W 91–82	15–10 (7–7)	26 – Maddox	9 – Freemantle	4 – Tied	Amica Mutual Pavilion (5,752); Providence, RI
February 15, 2025; 12:00 p.m., FS1		DePaul	W 85–68	16–10 (8–7)	19 – Freemantle	9 – Freemantle	8 – Swain	Cintas Center (10,473); Cincinnati, OH
February 18, 2025; 8:00 p.m., Peacock		Butler	W 76–63	17–10 (9–7)	14 – Tied	8 – Maddox Jr.	5 – McKnight	Cintas Center (10,023); Cincinnati, OH
February 23, 2025; 2:00 p.m., FS1		at Seton Hall	W 73–66	18–10 (10–7)	22 – Conwell	7 – Freemantle	7 – McKnight	Prudential Center (9,337); Newark, NJ
March 1, 2025; 4:30 p.m., FOX		Creighton	W 83–61	19–10 (11–7)	23 – Freemantle	7 – Swain	5 – Swain	Cintas Center (10,674); Cincinnati, OH
March 5, 2025; 7:00 p.m., CBSSN		at Butler	W 91–78	20–10 (12–7)	24 – Freemantle	10 – Swain	4 – Conwell	Hinkle Fieldhouse (8,225); Indianapolis, IN
March 8, 2025; 4:00 p.m., FS1		Providence	W 76–68	21–10 (13–7)	25 – Freemantle	8 – Freemantle	7 – Maddox Jr.	Cintas Center (10,532); Cincinnati, OH
Big East tournament
March 13, 2025; 2:30 p.m., Peacock	(4)	vs. (5) No. 25 Marquette; Quarterfinal	L 87–89	21–11	38 – Conwell	7 – Tied	5 – Freemantle	Madison Square Garden; New York, NY
NCAA tournament
March 19, 2025*; 9:10 p.m., TruTV	(11 MW)	vs. (11 MW) Texas; First Four	W 86–80	22–11	22 – Foster	8 – Foster	5 – McKnight	UD Arena (12,546); Dayton, OH
March 21, 2025*; 9:45 p.m., CBS	(11 MW)	vs. (6 MW) Illinois; First Round	L 73–86	22–12	27 – Swain	8 – Swain	3 – Swain	Fiserv Forum (16,894); Milwaukee, WI
*Non-conference game. ^{#}Rankings from AP poll. (#) Tournament seedings in parentheses. MW=Midwest. All times are in Eastern Time.

== Rankings ==
Ranking movements Legend: ██ Increase in ranking ██ Decrease in ranking — = Not ranked RV = Received votes
	Week																				
Poll	Pre	1	2	3	4	5	6	7	8	9	10	11	12	13	14	15	16	17	18	19	Final
AP	RV	RV	RV	22	RV	—	—	—	—	RV	—	—	—	—	—	—	—	—	RV	—	—
Coaches	RV	RV	RV	22	RV	—	—	—	—	—	—	—	—	—	—	—	—	—	—	—	—
