= Aaron Scott (basketball) =

American basketball player (born 2003)

No. 1 – Long Island Nets
- Position: Shooting guard
- League: NBA G League

Personal information
- Born: July 11, 2003 (age 23) Spring, Texas, U.S.
- Listed height: 6 ft 7 in (2.01 m)
- Listed weight: 190 lb (86 kg)

Career information
- High school: Legacy the School of Sport Sciences (Spring, Texas)
- College: North Texas (2021–2024); St. John’s (2024–2025)
- NBA draft: 2025: undrafted
- Playing career: 2025–present

Career history
- 2025–2026: Maine Celtics
- 2026–present: Long Island Nets

Career highlights
- Conference USA All-Freshman Team (2022)
- Stats at NBA.com
- Stats at Basketball Reference

Aaron Scott (born July 11, 2003) is an American professional basketball player for the Long Island Nets of the NBA G League. He played college basketball for North Texas Mean Green and St. John’s Red Storm.

== College career ==
Scott began his college basketball career with three seasons playing at North Texas. He was a CUSA All-Freshman team honoree in his freshman season and a full time starter for North Texas as a sophomore and junior. He averaged 11 points per game as a junior.

Scott transferred to St. John’s for his senior year where he started 30 games and averaged 8.4 points per game. Scott played under head coach Rick Pitino at St. John's.

In 2023, Scott’s Mean Green won the 2023 NIT championship. In 2025, Scott was a member of the St. John’s team that went to the Round of 32 of the 2025 NCAA tournament.

== Professional career ==
=== Maine Celtics (2025–2026) ===
Scott joined the Boston Celtics' summer league team for the 2025 NBA Summer League.

On October 18, 2025, Scott signed an Exhibit 10 contract with the Celtics. Scott was subsequently waived by the Celtics and is expected to sign with the Maine Celtics of the NBA G League. On October 25, 2025, Scott was announced as a member of the Maine Celtics training camp roster. He signed with the team on November 6.

In the 2025-26 season, Scott appeared in 26 games (including seven starts) for Maine, averaging 7.2 points and 3.4 rebounds per game.

=== Long Island Nets (2026–present) ===
On September 21, 2026, Scott signed an Exhibit 10 contract with the Brooklyn Nets.
