= Garwey Dual =

American-South Sudanese basketball player (born 2005)

No. 3 – Syracuse Orange
- Position: Point guard / shooting guard
- Conference: Atlantic Coast Conference

Personal information
- Born: March 17, 2005 (age 21)
- Listed height: 6 ft 5 in (1.96 m)
- Listed weight: 190 lb (86 kg)

Career information
- High school: George Bush (Richmond, Texas); Carmel (Carmel, Indiana); Southern California Academy (Castaic, California)
- College: Providence (2023–2024); Seton Hall (2024–2025); McNeese (2025–2026); Syracuse (2026–present)

Career highlights
- Nike Hoop Summit (2023); Southland All-Defensive Team (2026)

Garwey Dual (born March 17, 2005) is an American-South Sudanese college basketball player for the Syracuse Orange of the Atlantic Coast Conference. He previously played for the Providence Friars, Seton Hall Pirates, and McNeese Cowboys.

== Early life and high school career ==
Dual grew up in Houston, Texas and initially attended George Bush High School. He moved to Carmel, Indiana after his sophomore year and enrolled at Carmel High School, where he averaged 6.4 points and 1.7 rebounds per game. Dual transferred a second time to Southern California Academy in Castaic, California for his senior season. He was selected to play for Team World in the 2023 Nike Hoop Summit during his senior year.

=== Recruiting ===
Dual was rated a four-star recruit by major recruiting services. He committed to playing college basketball for Providence over offers from Arizona State, Wisconsin, Butler, DePaul, NC State, and Dayton. Dual later de-committed after Providence head coach Ed Cooley left the program to become the head coach at Georgetown. Dual eventually re-committed and signed a National Letter of Intent to play at Providence.

College recruiting
Name	Hometown	School	Height	Weight	Commit date
Garwey Dual; PG / SG	Houston, TX	Southern California Academy (CA)	6 ft 5 in (1.96 m)	175 lb (79 kg)	Apr 13, 2023
Garwey Dual; PG / SG	Recruit ratings: Rivals: 247Sports: ESPN: (87)				
Overall recruit ranking: Rivals: 32 247Sports: 47 ESPN: 44
Note: In many cases, Scout, Rivals, 247Sports, On3, and ESPN may conflict in their listings of height and weight.; In these cases, the average was taken. ESPN grades are on a 100-point scale.; Sources: "Providence 2023 Basketball Commitments". Rivals.; "2023 Providence Friars Recruiting Class". ESPN.; "2023 Team Ranking". Rivals.

== College career ==
Dual entered his freshman season at Providence as a backup guard. Dual was ejected from the Friars' opening round game of 2023 Baha Mar Hoops Bahamas Championship against Kansas State after getting in an altercation with Kansas State guard Dai Dai Ames and punching Ames in the face. Dual averaged 3.3 points and 1.9 assists per game as a freshman.

Following the season he transferred to Seton Hall. Dual averaged 5.4 points, 1.6 rebounds, and three assists per game for Seton Hall.

He entered the transfer portal again after the season, ultimately landing at McNeese State. Dual averaged 8.4 points, 4.4 assists, 2.9 rebounds and 1.6 steals per game. At McNeese, he was named to the Southland Conference all-defensive team for the 2025-26 season.

Following the season he transferred again, to Syracuse.

== Career statistics ==
Legend
GP	Games played	GS	Games started	MPG	Minutes per game
FG%	Field goal percentage	3P%	3-point field goal percentage	FT%	Free throw percentage
RPG	Rebounds per game	APG	Assists per game	SPG	Steals per game
BPG	Blocks per game	PPG	Points per game	**Bold**	Career high

=== College ===
Year	Team	GP	GS	MPG	FG%	3P%	FT%	RPG	APG	SPG	BPG	PPG
2023–24	Providence	33	6	18.5	.331	.250	.667	1.3	1.9	.8	.7	3.3
2024–25	Seton Hall	30	22	25.6	.422	.314	.632	1.6	3.0	1.7	.7	5.4
