= Kadary Richmond =

American basketball player (born 2001)

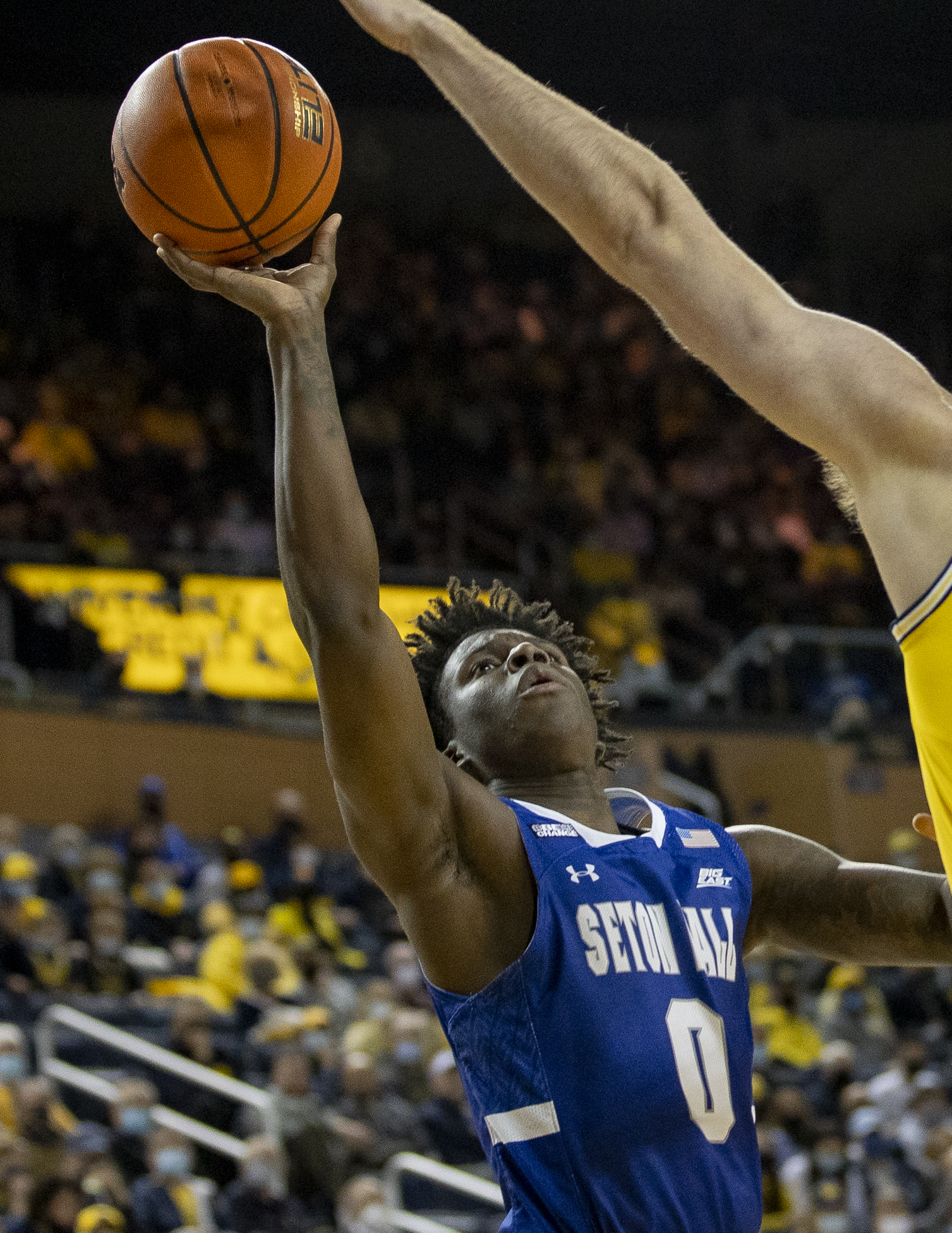
- Richmond in 2021

No. 1 – Cleveland Charge
- Position: Point guard / shooting guard
- League: NBA G League

Personal information
- Born: August 25, 2001 (age 25) New York City, New York, U.S.
- Listed height: 6 ft 6 in (1.98 m)
- Listed weight: 205 lb (93 kg)

Career information
- High school: Midwood (Brooklyn, New York); South Shore (Brooklyn, New York); Brewster Academy (Wolfeboro, New Hampshire)
- College: Syracuse (2020–2021); Seton Hall (2021–2024); St. John's (2024–2025)
- NBA draft: 2025: undrafted
- Playing career: 2025–present

Career history
- 2025–2026: Capital City Go-Go
- 2026: Washington Wizards
- 2026–present: Cleveland Charge

Career highlights
- First-team All-Big East (2024); Second-team All-Big East (2025); NIT champion (2024)
- Stats at NBA.com
- Stats at Basketball Reference

Kadary Richmond (born August 25, 2001) is an American professional basketball player for the Cleveland Charge of the NBA G League. He played college basketball for the Syracuse Orange, Seton Hall Pirates, and St. John's Red Storm.

== High school career ==
Richmond played for Midwood High School in his hometown of Brooklyn as a freshman before transferring to South Shore High School. He helped South Shore win two Public Schools Athletic League Class AA titles. Richmond played a postgraduate season at Brewster Academy in Wolfeboro, New Hampshire. He averaged 12.5 points, six rebounds and 3.8 assists per game, receiving First Team All-New England Preparatory School Athletic Council Class AAA honors. A four-star recruit, Richmond committed to playing college basketball for Syracuse over offers from UConn, Florida State, Cincinnati and Georgetown.

== College career ==
=== Syracuse Orange ===
On December 3, 2020, Richmond made his first career start for Syracuse in the absence of Buddy Boeheim. He recorded a freshman season-high 16 points, seven rebounds, six assists, four steals and three blocks in a 75–45 win over Niagara. As a freshman, he averaged 6.3 points, 3.1 assists, 2.6 rebounds and 1.6 steals in 21 minutes per game.

=== Seton Hall Pirates ===
After the season, Richmond transferred to Seton Hall. On January 8, 2022, he scored a career-high 27 points in a 90-87 overtime win over UConn. Richmond began playing more minutes later in January 2022 due to Bryce Aiken being in concussion protocol, and coach Kevin Willard said of Richmond, "I think you're starting to see the evolution of a really, really good player."

As a senior, Richmond earned first-team All-Big East honors after averaging 15.7 points, 7.0 rebounds and 5.1 assists per game. He led Seton Hall to an NIT title, contributing 21 points, 13 rebounds in the championship game against Indiana State.

=== St. John's Red Storm ===
In May 2024, Richmond transferred to St. John's to play for Rick Pitino. He averaged 12.4 points, 6.4 rebounds and 5.3 assists per game.

== Professional career ==
Following the close of his college career, Richmond signed with the Capital City Go-Go of the NBA G League. On February 11, 2026, Richmond was signed to a 10-day contract by the Washington Wizards, and debuted for the team that evening. He appeared in three NBA games, before his 10-day contract expired, and he returned to the Go-Go. Richmond was acquired by the Cleveland Charge on September 11, 2026.

== Personal life ==
Richmond grew up with Justin Champagnie, with the two taking the bus together in middle school; they later became teammates on the Wizards in 2026.

== Career statistics ==
Legend
GP	Games played	GS	Games started	MPG	Minutes per game
FG%	Field goal percentage	3P%	3-point field goal percentage	FT%	Free throw percentage
RPG	Rebounds per game	APG	Assists per game	SPG	Steals per game
BPG	Blocks per game	PPG	Points per game	**Bold**	Career high

=== College ===
Year	Team	GP	GS	MPG	FG%	3P%	FT%	RPG	APG	SPG	BPG	PPG
2020–21	Syracuse	28	3	21.0	.453	.333	.721	2.6	3.1	1.6	.5	6.3
2021–22	Seton Hall	32	26	25.9	.402	.345	.750	3.6	**4.1**	1.7	.3	8.8
2022–23	Seton Hall	27	25	27.5	.417	**.444**	.693	5.2	4.1	2.0	.3	10.1
2023–24	Seton Hall	35	34	**32.7**	.441	.270	**.807**	**7.0**	5.1	**2.2**	.6	**15.7**
2024–25	St. John's	**36**	**35**	32.3	**.487**	.175	.536	6.4	**5.3**	2.0	**.9**	12.4
Career		158	123	28.3	.444	.307	.707	5.1	4.4	1.9	.5	11.0

=== NBA ===
Year	Team	GP	GS	MPG	FG%	3P%	FT%	RPG	APG	SPG	BPG	PPG
2025–26	Washington	3	0	22.3	.625	.500	1.000	3.3	2.7	2.7	.3	8.3
Career		3	0	22.3	.625	.500	1.000	3.3	2.7	2.7	.3	8.3
