= 2023–24 Xavier Musketeers men's basketball team =

American college basketball season

2023–24 Xavier Musketeers men's basketball

NIT, First Round
- Conference: Big East Conference
- Record: 16–18 (9–11 Big East)
- Head coach: Sean Miller (2nd, 7th overall season)
- Associate head coach: Adam Cohen (2nd season)
- Assistant coaches: Dante Jackson (6th season); David Miller (2nd season)
- Home arena: Cintas Center

2023–24 Big East men's basketball standings
	Conf.				Overall
Team	W		L	PCT	W		L	PCT
No. 1 UConn †	18	–	2	.900	37	–	3	.925
No. 13 Creighton	14	–	6	.700	25	–	10	.714
No. 12 Marquette	14	–	6	.700	27	–	10	.730
Seton Hall	13	–	7	.650	25	–	12	.676
St. John's	11	–	9	.550	20	–	13	.606
Villanova	10	–	10	.500	18	–	16	.529
Providence	10	–	10	.500	21	–	14	.600
Butler	9	–	11	.450	18	–	15	.545
Xavier	9	–	11	.450	16	–	18	.471
Georgetown	2	–	18	.100	9	–	23	.281
DePaul	0	–	20	.000	3	–	29	.094
† 2024 Big East tournament winner Rankings from AP Poll

The 2023–24 Xavier Musketeers men's basketball team represented Xavier University during the 2023–24 NCAA Division I men's basketball season as a member of the Big East Conference. Led by Sean Miller in the second season of his second stint after coaching the Musketeers from 2004 to 2009, they played their home games at the Cintas Center in Cincinnati, Ohio.

== Previous season ==
The Musketeers finished the 2022–23 season 23–8, 15–5 in Big East play, to finish in second place. In the Big East tournament, they defeated DePaul and Creighton to reach the championship game, where they were defeated by Marquette. The team received an at-large bid to the NCAA tournament, where they defeated Kennesaw State and Pittsburgh to advance to the Sweet Sixteen for the first time since 2017. There they were defeated by Texas, bringing their season to a close with a final record of 27–10.

== Offseason ==
=== Departures ===
Name	Number	Pos.	Height	Weight	Year	Hometown	Reason for departure
Souley Boum	0	G	6'3"	175	GS Senior	Oakland, CA	Graduated
Colby Jones	3	G	6'6"	205	Junior	Birmingham, AL	Declare for 2023 NBA draft; selected 34th overall by Charlotte Hornets
Cesare Edwards	4	F	6'9"	225	Sophomore	Hartsville, SC	Transferred to Missouri State
Adam Kunkel	5	G	6'4"	185	GS Senior	Hebron, KY	Graduated
KyKy Tandy	15	G	6'2"	190	Senior	Hopkinsville, KY	Graduate transferred to Jacksonville State
Dieonte Miles	22	F	7'0"	240	RS Junior	Walton, KY	Transferred to Morehead State
Jack Nunge	24	F	7'0"	245	RS Senior	Newburgh, IN	Graduated
Elijah Tucker	34	F	6'7"	214	Sophomore	Canton, GA	Transferred to Longwood

=== Incoming transfers ===
Name	Num	Pos.	Height	Weight	Year	Hometown	Previous school
Quincy Olivari	8	G	6'3"	200	Senior	Atlanta, GA	Rice
Dayvion McKnight	20	G	6'1"	195	Senior	Shelbyville, KY	Western Kentucky
Abou Ousmane	24	F	6'10"	230	Senior	Brooklyn, NY	North Texas
Logan Duncomb	51	C	6'10"	241	Junior	Cincinnati, OH	Indiana

Note: After transferring to Xavier, Duncomb decided to step away from basketball for health reasons. He will remain enrolled at Xavier and complete his degree.

=== Recruiting classes ===
==== 2023 recruiting class ====
College recruiting information
Name	Hometown	School	Height	Weight	Commit date
Trey Green #18 PG	Charlotte, NC	Link Academy	5 ft 9 in (1.75 m)	160 lb (73 kg)	Aug 6, 2022
Trey Green #18 PG	Recruit ratings: Scout: Rivals: 247Sports: (85)				
Dailyn Swain #14 SF	Columbus, OH	Columbus Africentric High School	6 ft 7 in (2.01 m)	185 lb (84 kg)	Sep 2, 2022
Dailyn Swain #14 SF	Recruit ratings: Scout: Rivals: 247Sports: (82)				
Reid Ducharme #26 SF	Milton, MA	Brewster Academy	6 ft 6 in (1.98 m)	190 lb (86 kg)	Aug 25, 2022
Reid Ducharme #26 SF	Recruit ratings: Scout: Rivals: 247Sports: (82)				
Kachi Nzeh #69 C	Newtown, PA	George School	6 ft 8 in (2.03 m)	220 lb (100 kg)	Sep 8, 2022
Kachi Nzeh #69 C	Recruit ratings: Scout: Rivals: 247Sports: (76)				
Overall recruit ranking:
Note: In many cases, Scout, Rivals, 247Sports, On3, and ESPN may conflict in their listings of height and weight.; In these cases, the average was taken. ESPN grades are on a 100-point scale.; Sources: "Xavier 2023 Basketball Commitments". Rivals.; "2023 Xavier Musketeers Recruiting Class". ESPN.; "2023 Team Ranking". Rivals.; "Xavier 2023 Basketball Commits". 247Sports.

==== 2024 recruiting class ====
College recruiting information (2024)
Name	Hometown	School	Height	Weight	Commit date
Jonathan Powell #19 SG	Centerville, OH	Centerville High School	6 ft 4 in (1.93 m)	180 lb (82 kg)	May 31, 2023
Jonathan Powell #19 SG	Recruit ratings: Rivals: 247Sports: ESPN: (81)				
Overall recruit ranking:
Note: In many cases, Scout, Rivals, 247Sports, On3, and ESPN may conflict in their listings of height and weight.; In these cases, the average was taken. ESPN grades are on a 100-point scale.; Sources: "Xavier 2024 Basketball Commitments". Rivals.; "2024 Xavier Musketeers Recruiting Class". ESPN.; "2024 Team Ranking". Rivals.; "Xavier 2024 Basketball Commits". 247Sports.

== Roster ==
2023–24 Xavier Musketeers men's basketball team
Players
Coaches

Pos.	#	Name	Height	Weight	Year	Previous school	Hometown
G	0	Trey Green	6 ft 0 in (1.83 m)	160 lb (73 kg)	Fr	Prolific Prep (CA)	Charlotte, NC
G	1	Desmond Claude	6 ft 6 in (1.98 m)	203 lb (92 kg)	So	Putnam Science Academy	New Haven, CT
F	2	Jerome Hunter (injured)	6 ft 8 in (2.03 m)	210 lb (95 kg)	GS	Indiana	Columbus, OH
G	3	Dailyn Swain	6 ft 7 in (2.01 m)	200 lb (91 kg)	Fr	Columbus Africentric Early College	Columbus, OH
G	8	Quincy Olivari	6 ft 3 in (1.91 m)	200 lb (91 kg)	Sr	Rice	Atlanta, GA
G/F	11	Reid Ducharme	6 ft 7 in (2.01 m)	195 lb (88 kg)	Fr	Brewster Academy	Milton, MA
F	12	Kam Craft	6 ft 6 in (1.98 m)	211 lb (96 kg)	So	The Skill Factory (GA)	Buffalo Grove, IL
C	15	Kachi Nzeh	6 ft 8 in (2.03 m)	230 lb (104 kg)	Fr	George School	Upper Darby, PA
F	17	Lazar Đjoković	6 ft 10 in (2.08 m)	230 lb (104 kg)	Fr	Crvena Zvezda	Gornji Milanovac, Serbia
G	20	Dayvion McKnight	6 ft 0 in (1.83 m)	188 lb (85 kg)	Sr	Western Kentucky	Shelbyville, KY
F	21	Saša Ciani	6 ft 9 in (2.06 m)	240 lb (109 kg)	So	Cedevita Junior	Šempeter pri Gorici, Slovenia
F	24	Abou Ousmane	6 ft 10 in (2.08 m)	230 lb (104 kg)	Sr	North Texas	Brooklyn, NY
G	25	Michael Wolf (W)	6 ft 0 in (1.83 m)	185 lb (84 kg)	So	Bridgton Academy	Greenwood Village, CO
F	31	Ian Sabourin (W)	6 ft 4 in (1.93 m)	210 lb (95 kg)	So	Badin HS	Hamilton, OH
F	32	Zach Freemantle (injured)	6 ft 9 in (2.06 m)	227 lb (103 kg)	GS	Bergen Catholic HS	Teaneck, NJ
G	35	Bob Nunge (W)	6 ft 6 in (1.98 m)	195 lb (88 kg)	Jr	Castle HS	Newburgh, IN
G	45	Brad Colbert (W)	6 ft 2 in (1.88 m)	190 lb (86 kg)	Jr	Louisville	Loveland, OH
F	50	Gytis Nemeikša	6 ft 7 in (2.01 m)	203 lb (92 kg)	Fr	Zalgiris Kaunas II	Kaunas, Lithuania

Head coach

- Sean Miller (Pittsburgh)

Assistant coach(es)

- Adam Cohen (Arizona)
- Dante Jackson (Xavier)
- David Miller (Arizona)

Legend

- (C) Team captain
- (S) Suspended
- (I) Ineligible
- (W) Walk-on
- Injured
- Current redshirt

Roster
Last update: March 18, 2024

== Schedule and results ==
Date time, TV	Rank^{#}	Opponent^{#}	Result	Record	High points	High rebounds	High assists	Site (attendance) city, state
Non-conference regular season
November 6, 2023*; 8:00 p.m., FS1		Robert Morris	W 77–63	1–0	25 – Claude	12 – Nemeikša	5 – McKnight	Cintas Center (10,224); Cincinnati, OH
November 10, 2023*; 6:30 p.m., FS2		Jacksonville	W 79–56	2–0	17 – Olivari	8 – Ousmane	4 – Tied	Cintas Center (10,426); Cincinnati, OH
November 13, 2023*; 8:30 p.m., FS1		at No. 2 Purdue; Gavitt Tipoff Games	L 71–83	2–1	15 – Claude	7 – Nemeikša	6 – Claude	Mackey Arena (14,876); West Lafayette, IN
November 18, 2023*; 12:00 a.m., ESPN2		vs. Washington; Continental Tire Main Event semifinals	L 71–74	2–2	20 – Nemeikša	9 – Olivari	4 – Green	T-Mobile Arena (–); Paradise, NV
November 19, 2023*; 7:30 p.m., ESPN+		vs. Saint Mary's; Continental Tire Main Event consolation	W 66–49	3–2	14 – McKnight	6 – Ciani	7 – Claude	T-Mobile Arena (–); Paradise, NV
November 24, 2023*; 12:00 p.m., FS1		Bryant; Continental Tire Main Event campus site game	W 100–75	4–2	22 – Olivari	8 – McKnight	8 – McKnight	Cintas Center (10,224); Cincinnati, OH
November 27, 2023*; 6:30 p.m., FS1		Oakland	L 76–78	4–3	24 – Claude	7 – Olivari	8 – McKnight	Cintas Center (10,199); Cincinnati, OH
December 1, 2023*; 6:30 p.m., FS1		No. 6 Houston; Big East–Big 12 Battle	L 60–66	4–4	17 – Olivari	8 – Nemeikša	4 – Olivari	Cintas Center (10,472); Cincinnati, OH
December 5, 2023*; 6:30 p.m., FS1		Delaware	L 80–87	4–5	34 – Olivari	8 – Ousmane	7 – McKnight	Cintas Center (10,035); Cincinnati, OH
December 9, 2023*; 6:30 p.m., FS1		Cincinnati; Crosstown Shootout	W 84–79	5–5	27 – Olivari	11 – Ousmane	6 – Claude	Cintas Center (10,724); Cincinnati, OH
December 16, 2023*; 7:30 p.m., FS1		Winthrop	W 75–59	6–5	22 – Olivari	9 – Tied	9 – McKnight	Cintas Center (10,224); Cincinnati, OH
Big East regular season
December 20, 2023; 7:00 p.m., FS1		at St. John's	L 66–81	6–6 (0–1)	21 – Claude	12 – Claude	3 – Tied	Carnesecca Arena (5,602); Queens, NY
December 23, 2023; 2:00 p.m., FS1		Seton Hall	W 74–54	7–6 (1–1)	29 – Olivari	10 – Ousmane	10 – McKnight	Cintas Center (10,224); Cincinnati, OH
January 3, 2024; 8:30 p.m., FS1		at Villanova	L 65–66	7–7 (1–2)	14 – Olivari	8 – Olivari	3 – McKnight	Finneran Pavilion (6,501); Villanova, PA
January 10, 2024; 8:30 p.m., FS1		No. 4 UConn	L 75–80	7–8 (1–3)	24 – Olivari	11 – Ousmane	5 – Claude	Cintas Center (10,335); Cincinnati, OH
January 13, 2024; 2:00 p.m., FS1		at Providence	W 85–65	8–8 (2–3)	23 – Green	7 – Nemeiksa	8 – McKnight	Amica Mutual Pavilion (12,348); Providence, RI
January 16, 2024; 6:30 p.m., FS1		Butler	W 85–71	9–8 (3–3)	26 – Claude	11 – Ousmane	5 – Olivari	Cintas Center (10,224); Cincinnati, OH
January 19, 2024; 6:30 p.m., FS1		Georgetown	W 92–91	10–8 (4–3)	27 – Olivari	7 – Ousmane	9 – Claude	Cintas Center (10,432); Cincinnati, OH
January 23, 2024; 8:30 p.m., FS1		at No. 17 Creighton	L 78–85	10–9 (4–4)	20 – Tied	7 – Olivari	3 – Olivari	CHI Health Center Omaha (17,195); Omaha, NE
January 28, 2024; 12:00 p.m., FS1		at No. 1 UConn	L 56–99	10–10 (4–5)	18 – McKnight	6 – Ousmane	4 – McKnight	XL Center (15,684); Hartford, CT
January 31, 2024; 6:30 p.m., FS1		St. John's	W 88–77	11–10 (5–5)	23 – Tied	8 – Ousmane	6 – McKnight	Cintas Center (10,360); Cincinnati, OH
February 3, 2024; 9:30 p.m., FS1		at DePaul	W 93–68	12–10 (6–5)	43 – Olivari	10 – Olivari	7 – McKnight	Wintrust Arena (3,649); Chicago, IL
February 7, 2024; 7:00 p.m., FS1		Villanova	W 56–53	13–10 (7–5)	14 – Olivari	9 – Ousmane	7 – McKnight	Cintas Center (10,285); Cincinnati, OH
February 10, 2024; 12:30 p.m., FOX		No. 19 Creighton	L 71–78	13–11 (7–6)	22 – Claude	8 – McKnight	5 – Tied	Cintas Center (10,555); Cincinnati, OH
February 14, 2024; 7:00 p.m., CBSSN		at Seton Hall	L 70–88	13–12 (7–7)	25 – Olivari	6 – Olivari	5 – Ciani	Prudential Center (8,361); Newark, NJ
February 21, 2024; 8:00 p.m., CBSSN		Providence	L 75–79	13–13 (7–8)	22 – Claude	13 – Ousmane	6 – McKnight	Cintas Center (10,224); Cincinnati, OH
February 25, 2024; 5:00 p.m., FS1		at No. 7 Marquette	L 64–88	13–14 (7–9)	16 – Green	8 – Ousmane	6 – McKnight	Fiserv Forum (17,540); Milwaukee, WI
February 28, 2024; 7:00 p.m., FS2		DePaul	W 91–58	14–14 (8–9)	32 – Olivari	6 – Swain	8 – McKnight	Cintas Center (10,136); Cincinnati, OH
March 2, 2024; 7:30 p.m., FS1		at Georgetown	W 98–93	15–14 (9–9)	36 – Claude	6 – Nzeh	4 – Claude	Capital One Arena (7,016); Washington, D.C.
March 6, 2024; 7:00 p.m., CBSSN		at Butler	L 66–72	15–15 (9–10)	17 – Claude	10 – Ousmane	2 – Nzeh	Hinkle Fieldhouse (8,976); Indianapolis, IN
March 9, 2024; 5:00 p.m., FOX		No. 8 Marquette	L 80–86	15–16 (9–11)	32 – Olivari	6 – Tied	8 – McKnight	Cintas Center (10,380); Cincinnati, OH
Big East tournament
March 13, 2024; 4:00 p.m., FS1	(9)	vs. (8) Butler; First Round	W 76–72	16–16	26 – Claude	9 – Olivari	6 – Olivari	Madison Square Garden; New York, NY
March 14, 2024; 12:00 p.m., FS1	(9)	vs. (1) No. 2 UConn; Quarterfinal	L 60–87	16–17	17 – Olivari	6 – Tied	2 – Tied	Madison Square Garden; New York, NY
NIT
March 19, 2024; 7:00 p.m., ESPN		at (4) Georgia; First Round - Wake Forest Bracket	L 76–78	16–18	30 – Claude	10 – Ousmane	5 – Claude	Stegeman Coliseum (2,756); Athens, GA
*Non-conference game. ^{#}Rankings from AP poll. (#) Tournament seedings in parentheses. All times are in Eastern Time.

== Rankings ==
Ranking movements Legend: RV = Received votes
	Week																			
Poll	Pre	1	2	3	4	5	6	7	8	9	10	11	12	13	14	15	16	17	18	Final
AP	RV																			
Coaches	RV																			
