= 2023–24 Providence Friars men's basketball team =

American college basketball season

2023–24 Providence Friars men's basketball
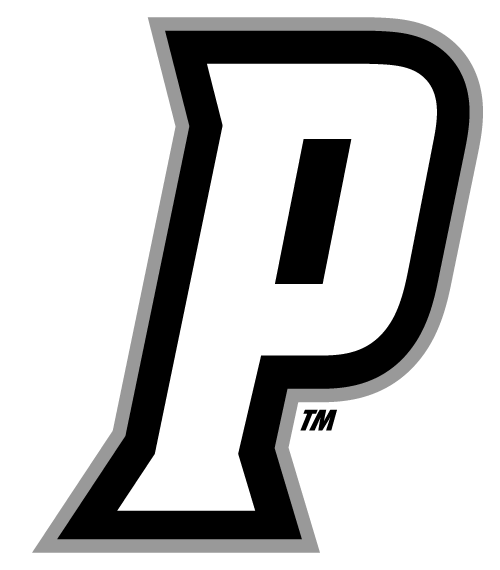

NIT, First Round
- Conference: Big East Conference
- Record: 21–14 (10–10 Big East)
- Head coach: Kim English (1st season)
- Assistant coaches: Dennis Felton (1st season); Tim Fuller (1st season); Nate Tomlinson (1st season)
- Home arena: Amica Mutual Pavilion

2023–24 Big East men's basketball standings
| | Conf. | | | | Overall |
| Team | W | | L | PCT | W | | L | PCT |
|---|---|---|---|---|---|---|---|---|
| No. 1 UConn † | 18 | – | 2 | .900 | 37 | – | 3 | .925 |
| No. 13 Creighton | 14 | – | 6 | .700 | 25 | – | 10 | .714 |
| No. 12 Marquette | 14 | – | 6 | .700 | 27 | – | 10 | .730 |
| Seton Hall | 13 | – | 7 | .650 | 25 | – | 12 | .676 |
| St. John's | 11 | – | 9 | .550 | 20 | – | 13 | .606 |
| Villanova | 10 | – | 10 | .500 | 18 | – | 16 | .529 |
| Providence | 10 | – | 10 | .500 | 21 | – | 14 | .600 |
| Butler | 9 | – | 11 | .450 | 18 | – | 15 | .545 |
| Xavier | 9 | – | 11 | .450 | 16 | – | 18 | .471 |
| Georgetown | 2 | – | 18 | .100 | 9 | – | 23 | .281 |
| DePaul | 0 | – | 20 | .000 | 3 | – | 29 | .094 |
† 2024 Big East tournament winner Rankings from AP Poll

The 2023–24 Providence Friars men's basketball team represented Providence College during the 2023–24 NCAA Division I men's basketball season. The team was led by 1st-year head coach Kim English, and played their home games at Amica Mutual Pavilion in Providence, Rhode Island as a member of the Big East Conference.

== Previous season ==
The Friars finished the 2022–23 season 21–12, 13–7 in Big East play to finish in a tie for fourth place. They lost in the quarterfinals of the Big East tournament to UConn. They received an at-large bid to the NCAA tournament as the No. 11 seed in the East region. There they lost to Kentucky in the first round.

On March 10, 2023, Ed Cooley left the school to take the head coach job at Georgetown. On March 23, the school named George Mason head coach Kim English the team's new head coach.

== Offseason ==
=== Departures ===
| Name | Number | Pos. | Height | Weight | Year | Hometown | Reason for departure |
|---|---|---|---|---|---|---|---|
| Alyn Breed | 0 | G | 6'3" | 190 | Junior | Powder Springs, GA | Transferred |
| Quante Berry | 3 | G | 6'4" | 175 | Freshman | Cleveland, TN | Transferred to Temple |
| Jared Bynum | 4 | G | 5'10" | 180 | RS Senior | Largo, MD | Graduate transferred to Stanford |
| Ed Croswell | 5 | F | 6'8" | 240 | RS Senior | Philadelphia, PA | Graduated |
| Noah Locke | 10 | G | 6'3" | 205 | GS Senior | Baltimore, MD | Graduated |
| Scott Morozov | 13 | F | 6'6" | 225 | Freshman | Toronto, ON | Walk-on; transferred |
| Clifton Moore | 21 | F | 6'10" | 240 | GS Senior | Horsham, PA | Graduated |

=== Incoming transfers ===
| Name | Number | Pos. | Height | Weight | Year | Hometown | Previous school |
|---|---|---|---|---|---|---|---|
| Davonte Gaines | 0 | G | 6'7" | 175 | GS Senior | Buffalo, NY | George Mason |
| Justyn Fernandez | 4 | G | 6'5" | 200 | Sophomore | Richmond, VA | George Mason |
| Josh Oduro | 13 | F | 6'9" | 235 | GS Senior | Gainesville, VA | George Mason |

=== Recruiting classes ===
==== 2023 recruiting class ====
College recruiting information
| Name | Hometown | School | Height | Weight | Commit date |
|---|---|---|---|---|---|
| Garwey Dual #5 SG | Carmel, IN | Southern California Academy | 6 ft 5 in (1.96 m) | 180 lb (82 kg) | Jun 20, 2022 |
| Garwey Dual #5 SG | Recruit ratings: Scout: Rivals: 247Sports: ESPN: (87) | | | | |
| Donovan Santoro; PF | Westlake, TX | Southern California Academy | 6 ft 8 in (2.03 m) | 185 lb (84 kg) | Oct 14, 2022 |
| Donovan Santoro; PF | Recruit ratings: Scout: Rivals: 247Sports: ESPN: (NR) | | | | |
| Richard Barron; SG | Chicago, IL | Saint Ignatius College Prep | 6 ft 5 in (1.96 m) | 215 lb (98 kg) | Apr 3, 2023 |
| Richard Barron; SG | Recruit ratings: Scout: Rivals: 247Sports: ESPN: (NR) | | | | |
| Eli DeLaurier; PF | Charlottesville, VA | The Miller School | 6 ft 10 in (2.08 m) | 220 lb (100 kg) | Sep 6, 2023 |
| Eli DeLaurier; PF | Recruit ratings: Scout: Rivals: 247Sports: ESPN: (79) | | | | |
Overall recruit ranking:
Note: In many cases, Scout, Rivals, 247Sports, On3, and ESPN may conflict in their listings of height and weight.; In these cases, the average was taken. ESPN grades are on a 100-point scale.; Sources: "2023 Team Ranking". Rivals.

==== 2024 recruiting class ====
College recruiting information (2024)
| Name | Hometown | School | Height | Weight | Commit date |
|---|---|---|---|---|---|
| Ryan Mela; SF | Natick, MA | The Newman School | 6 ft 6 in (1.98 m) | 195 lb (88 kg) | Aug 1, 2023 |
| Ryan Mela; SF | Recruit ratings: Scout: Rivals: 247Sports: ESPN: (NR) | | | | |
Overall recruit ranking:
Note: In many cases, Scout, Rivals, 247Sports, On3, and ESPN may conflict in their listings of height and weight.; In these cases, the average was taken. ESPN grades are on a 100-point scale.; Sources: "2024 Team Ranking". Rivals.

== Roster ==
2023–24 Providence Friars men's basketball team
Players
Coaches

| Pos. | # | Name | Height | Weight | Year | Previous school | Hometown |
|---|---|---|---|---|---|---|---|
| G | 0 | Davonte Gaines | 6 ft 7 in (2.01 m) | 190 lb (86 kg) | GS | Hargrave Military Academy; George Mason | Buffalo, New York |
| G | 1 | Jayden Pierre | 6 ft 2 in (1.88 m) | 180 lb (82 kg) | So | Long Island Lutheran High School | Elizabeth, New Jersey |
| F | 2 | Donvoan Santoro | 6 ft 8 in (2.03 m) | 205 lb (93 kg) | Fr | Southern California Academy | Los Angeles, California |
| G | 3 | Garwey Dual | 6 ft 5 in (1.96 m) | 190 lb (86 kg) | Fr | Southern California Academy | Houston, Texas |
| G | 4 | Justyn Fernandez | 6 ft 5 in (1.96 m) | 208 lb (94 kg) | So | IMG Academy; George Mason | Richmond, Virginia |
| G/F | 10 | Rich Barron | 6 ft 5 in (1.96 m) | 220 lb (100 kg) | Fr | St. Ignatius | Chicago, Illinois |
| F | 12 | Eli DeLaurier | 6 ft 10 in (2.08 m) | 220 lb (100 kg) | Fr | Miller School | Shipman, Virginia |
| F | 13 | Josh Oduro | 6 ft 9 in (2.06 m) | 240 lb (109 kg) | GS | Paul VI High School; George Mason | Gainesville, Virginia |
| G | 14 | Corey Floyd Jr. | 6 ft 4 in (1.93 m) | 210 lb (95 kg) | RS So | Roselle Catholic High School; UConn | Franklin, New Jersey |
| G | 22 | Devin Carter | 6 ft 3 in (1.91 m) | 195 lb (88 kg) | Jr | Brewster Academy; South Carolina | Miami, Florida |
| F | 23 | Bryce Hopkins | 6 ft 7 in (2.01 m) | 220 lb (100 kg) | Jr | Fenwick High School; Kentucky | Oak Park, Illinois |
| G | 24 | Luke Fonts (W) | 6 ft 1 in (1.85 m) | 190 lb (86 kg) | Jr | Portsmouth Abbey School | Portsmouth, Rhode Island |
| F | 30 | Rafael Castro | 6 ft 11 in (2.11 m) | 220 lb (100 kg) | RS So | Dover High School | Dover, New Jersey |
| F | 33 | Kieran O'Haire (W) | 6 ft 2 in (1.88 m) | 190 lb (86 kg) | Jr | The Albany Academy | Menands, New York |

Head coach

- Kim English (Missouri)

Assistant coach(es)

- Dennis Felton (Howard)
- Tim Fuller (Wake Forest)
- Nate Tomlinson (Colorado)

Legend

- (C) Team captain
- (S) Suspended
- (I) Ineligible
- (W) Walk-on
- Injured
- Current redshirt

Roster

== Schedule and results ==
| Date time, TV | Rank^{#} | Opponent^{#} | Result | Record | High points | High rebounds | High assists | Site (attendance) city, state |
Non-conference regular season
| November 6, 2023*; 7:00 p.m., FS1 | | Columbia | W 78–59 | 1–0 | 14 – Hopkins | 10 – Hopkins | 4 – Carter | Amica Mutual Pavilion (11,069); Providence, RI |
| November 11, 2023*; 6:00 p.m., FS2 | | Milwaukee | W 79–69 | 2–0 | 16 – Pierre | 12 – Oduro | 5 – Tied | Amica Mutual Pavilion (12,090); Providence, RI |
| November 14, 2023*; 6:00 p.m., FS1 | | Wisconsin; Gavitt Tipoff Games | W 72–59 | 3–0 | 21 – Carter | 8 – Carter | 4 – Oduro | Amica Mutual Pavilion (12,069); Providence, RI |
| November 17, 2023*; 6:00 p.m., CBSSN | | vs. Kansas State; Baha Mar Hoops Bahamas Championship semifinals | L 70–73 ^{OT} | 3–1 | 19 – Carter | 10 – Hopkins | 3 – Dual | Baha Mar Convention Center (1,833); Nassau, Bahamas |
| November 19, 2023*; 12:00 p.m., CBSSN | | vs. Georgia; Baha Mar Hoops Bahamas Championship consolation | W 71–64 | 4–1 | 19 – Tied | 11 – Carter | 5 – Carter | Baha Mar Convention Center (–); Nassau, Bahamas |
| November 24, 2023*; 7:00 p.m., FS2 | | Lehigh | W 78–64 | 5–1 | 29 – Oduro | 14 – Hopkins | 4 – Floyd Jr. | Amica Mutual Pavilion (11,397); Providence, RI |
| November 28, 2023*; 7:00 p.m., FS1 | | Wagner | W 86–52 | 6–1 | 21 – Gaines | 13 – Carter | 6 – Carter | Amica Mutual Pavilion (8,069); Providence, RI |
| December 2, 2023*; 7:30 p.m., FS1 | | Rhode Island; Ocean State Rivalry | W 84–69 | 7–1 | 24 – Hopkins | 11 – Carter | 3 – 2 tied | Amica Mutual Pavilion (12,513); Providence, RI |
| December 5, 2023*; 7:00 p.m., ESPNU | | at No. 19 Oklahoma; Big East–Big 12 Battle | L 51–72 | 7–2 | 17 – Carter | 6 – Oduro | 5 – Oduro | Lloyd Noble Center (7,234); Norman, OK |
| December 10, 2023*; 12:00 p.m., CBSSN | | Brown | W 74–54 | 8–2 | 18 – Carter | 7 – Hopkins | 4 – Gaines | Amica Mutual Pavilion (8,655); Providence, RI |
| December 16, 2023*; 1:30 p.m., FS1 | | Sacred Heart | W 78–64 | 9–2 | 26 – Hopkins | 12 – Hopkins | 7 – Dual | Amica Mutual Pavilion (8,813); Providence, RI |
Big East regular season
| December 19, 2023; 8:30 p.m., FS1 | | No. 6 Marquette | W 72–57 | 10–2 (1–0) | 22 – Carter | 9 – 2 tied | 7 – Dual | Amica Mutual Pavilion (12,108); Providence, RI |
| December 23, 2023; 12:00 p.m., FS1 | | Butler | W 85–75 ^{OT} | 11–2 (2–0) | 24 – Carter | 14 – Oduro | 6 – Tied | Amica Mutual Pavilion (11,602); Providence, RI |
| January 3, 2024; 6:30 p.m., FS1 | No. 23 | Seton Hall | L 57–61 | 11–3 (2–1) | 23 – Oduro | 10 – Carter | 6 – Carter | Amica Mutual Pavilion (11,458); Providence, RI |
| January 6, 2024; 2:00 p.m., FS1 | No. 23 | at Creighton | L 60–69 | 11–4 (2–2) | 25 – Carter | 10 – Carter | 5 – Pierre | CHI Health Center Omaha (17,253); Omaha, NE |
| January 10, 2024; 6:30 p.m., FS1 | | at St. John's | L 73–75 | 11–5 (2–3) | 31 – Carter | 13 – Carter | 5 – Pierre | Madison Square Garden (11,832); New York, NY |
| January 13, 2024; 2:00 p.m., FS1 | | Xavier | L 65–85 | 11–6 (2–4) | 20 – Oduro | 7 – Carter | 4 – Tied | Amica Mutual Pavilion (12,348); Providence, RI |
| January 17, 2024; 9:00 p.m., FS1 | | at DePaul | W 100–62 | 12–6 (3–4) | 25 – Carter | 9 – Oduro | 5 – Pierre | Wintrust Arena (2,889); Chicago, IL |
| January 24, 2024; 6:30 p.m., FS1 | | at Seton Hall | W 67–63 | 13–6 (4–4) | 17 – Gaines | 8 – Oduro | 6 – Carter | Prudential Center (8,895); Newark, NJ |
| January 27, 2024; 12:38 p.m., FOX | | Georgetown | W 84–76 | 14–6 (5–4) | 29 – Carter | 7 – Gaines | 4 – Gaines | Amica Mutual Pavilion (12,580); Providence, RI |
| January 31, 2024; 8:30 p.m., FS1 | | at No. 1 UConn | L 65–74 | 14–7 (5–5) | 20 – Tied | 9 – Tied | 4 – Carter | Harry A. Gampel Pavilion (10,299); Storrs, CT |
| February 4, 2024; 6:00 p.m., FS1 | | at Villanova | L 50–68 | 14–8 (5–6) | 18 – Oduro | 12 – Oduro | 4 – Carter | Wells Fargo Center (13,168); Philadelphia, PA |
| February 7, 2024; 8:30 p.m., FS2 | | No. 19 Creighton | W 91–87 ^{OT} | 15–8 (6–6) | 32 – Oduro | 12 – Oduro | 6 – Carter | Amica Mutual Pavilion (12,078); Providence, RI |
| February 10, 2024; 2:00 p.m., FS1 | | at Butler | L 72–75 | 15–9 (6–7) | 20 – Floyd Jr. | 5 – Tied | 5 – Pierre | Hinkle Fieldhouse (8,934); Indianapolis, IN |
| February 13, 2024; 7:00 p.m., CBSSN | | St. John's | W 75–72 | 16–9 (7–7) | 28 – Oduro | 11 – Carter | 5 – Pierre | Amica Mutual Pavilion (10,258); Providence, RI |
| February 17, 2024; 7:30 p.m., FS1 | | DePaul | W 81–70 | 17–9 (8–7) | 31 – Carter | 13 – Carter | 3 – Tied | Amica Mutual Pavilion (12,400); Providence, RI |
| February 21, 2024; 8:00 p.m., CBSSN | | at Xavier | W 79–75 | 18–9 (9–7) | 22 – Carter | 11 – Carter | 7 – Carter | Cintas Center (10,224); Cincinnati, OH |
| February 28, 2024; 7:00 p.m., FS1 | | at No. 5 Marquette | L 69–91 | 18–10 (9–8) | 18 – Carter | 6 – Oduro | 5 – Carter | Fiserv Forum (15,341); Milwaukee, WI |
| March 2, 2024; 12:00 p.m., FOX | | Villanova | L 60–71 | 18–11 (9–9) | 16 – Oduro | 9 – Tied | 3 – Tied | Amica Mutual Pavilion (12,525); Providence, RI |
| March 5, 2024; 7:00 p.m., FS1 | | at Georgetown | W 71–58 | 19–11 (10–9) | 24 – Carter | 12 – Carter | 5 – Gaines | Capital One Arena (5,287); Washington, D.C. |
| March 9, 2024; 8:00 p.m., FOX | | No. 2 UConn | L 60–74 | 19–12 (10–10) | 24 – Carter | 15 – Carter | 4 – Carter | Amica Mutual Pavilion (12,608); Providence, RI |
Big East tournament
| March 13, 2024; 6:40 p.m., FS1 | (7) | vs. (10) Georgetown; First Round | W 74–56 | 20–12 | 20 – Oduro | 9 – Tied | 6 – Carter | Madison Square Garden (19,812); New York, NY |
| March 14, 2024; 7:00 p.m., FS1 | (7) | vs. (2) No. 8 Creighton; Quarterfinal | W 78–73 | 21–12 | 22 – Carter | 11 – Carter | 7 – Pierre | Madison Square Garden (19,812); New York, NY |
| March 15, 2024; 8:00 p.m., FS1 | (7) | vs. (3) No. 10 Marquette; Semifinal | L 68–79 | 21–13 | 27 – Carter | 10 – Tied | 3 – Carter | Madison Square Garden (19,812); New York, NY |
National Invitation Tournament
| March 19, 2024; 7:00 p.m., ESPNU | (3) | Boston College; First Round - Seton Hall Bracket | L 57–62 | 21–14 | 21 – Pierre | 9 – Oduro | 4 – Oduro | Amica Mutual Pavilion (6,507); Providence, RI |
*Non-conference game. ^{#}Rankings from AP Poll. (#) Tournament seedings in parentheses. All times are in Eastern Time.

== Rankings ==
Ranking movements Legend: ██ Increase in ranking ██ Decrease in ranking — = Not ranked RV = Received votes
| | Week | | | | | | | | | | | | | | | | | | | | |
| Poll | Pre | 1 | 2 | 3 | 4 | 5 | 6 | 7 | 8 | 9 | 10 | 11 | 12 | 13 | 14 | 15 | 16 | 17 | 18 | 19 | Final |
|---|---|---|---|---|---|---|---|---|---|---|---|---|---|---|---|---|---|---|---|---|---|
| AP | — | — | — | — | RV | RV | RV | 25 | 23 | RV | — | — | — | — | — | — | — | — | — | — | |
| Coaches | — | — | — | — | — | — | — | 25 | 23 | RV | — | — | — | — | — | — | — | — | — | — | |
