= 2024 Big East men's basketball tournament =

U.S. collegiate basketball event

- Classification: Division I
- Season: 2023–24
- Teams: 11
- Site: Madison Square Garden; New York City
- Champions: UConn (8th title)
- Winning coach: Dan Hurley (1st title)
- MVP: Tristen Newton (UConn)
- Attendance: 99,060 (total); 19,812 (championship)
- Television: FS1, Fox

2023–24 Big East men's basketball standings
	Conf.				Overall
Team	W		L	PCT	W		L	PCT
No. 1 UConn †	18	–	2	.900	37	–	3	.925
No. 13 Creighton	14	–	6	.700	25	–	10	.714
No. 12 Marquette	14	–	6	.700	27	–	10	.730
Seton Hall	13	–	7	.650	25	–	12	.676
St. John's	11	–	9	.550	20	–	13	.606
Villanova	10	–	10	.500	18	–	16	.529
Providence	10	–	10	.500	21	–	14	.600
Butler	9	–	11	.450	18	–	15	.545
Xavier	9	–	11	.450	16	–	18	.471
Georgetown	2	–	18	.100	9	–	23	.281
DePaul	0	–	20	.000	3	–	29	.094
† 2024 Big East tournament winner Rankings from AP Poll

The 2024 Big East Men's Basketball Tournament was the postseason men's basketball tournament for the Big East Conference held March 13–16, 2024, at Madison Square Garden in New York City. The winner received the conference's automatic bid to the 2024 NCAA Tournament.

== Seeds ==
All 11 Big East schools participated in the tournament. Teams were seeded by their conference records with tie-breaking procedures to determine the seeds for teams with identical conference records. The top five teams received first-round byes. Seeding for the tournament was determined at the close of the regular conference season.

Seed	School	Conference	Tiebreaker
1	UConn	18–2	
2	Creighton	14–6	1–1 vs. UConn
3	Marquette	14–6	0–2 vs. UConn
4	Seton Hall	13–7	
5	St. John's	11–9	
6	Villanova	10–10	2–0 vs. Providence
7	Providence	10–10	0–2 vs. Villanova
8	Butler	9–11	2–2 vs. Creighton/Marquette
9	Xavier	9–11	0–4 vs. Creighton/Marquette
10	Georgetown	2–18	
11	DePaul	0–20	

== Schedule ==
Game	Time	Matchup	Score	Television	Attendance
First round – Wednesday, March 13
1	4:00 pm	No. 8 Butler vs. No. 9 Xavier	72–76	FS1	19,812
2	6:40 pm	No. 7 Providence vs. No. 10 Georgetown	74–56	FS1	19,812
3	9:00 pm	No. 6 Villanova vs. No. 11 DePaul	58–57	FS1	19,812
Quarterfinals – Thursday, March 14
4	12:00 pm	No. 1 UConn vs. No. 9 Xavier	87–60	FS1	19,812
5	2:30 pm	No. 4 Seton Hall vs. No. 5 St. John’s	72–91	FS1	19,812
6	7:00 pm	No. 2 Creighton vs. No. 7 Providence	73–78	FS1	19,812
7	9:30 pm	No. 3 Marquette vs. No. 6 Villanova	71–65^{OT}	FS1	19,812
Semifinals – Friday, March 15
8	5:30 pm	No. 1 UConn vs. No. 5 St. John’s	95–90	FOX	19,812
9	8:00 pm	No. 7 Providence vs. No. 3 Marquette	68–79	FS1	19,812
Championship – Saturday, March 16
10	6:30 pm	No. 1 UConn vs. No. 3 Marquette	73–57	FOX	19,812
Game times in Eastern Time. Rankings denote tournament seed.

== Bracket ==
First round Wednesday, March 13; FS1
8	Butler	72
9	Xavier	76
7	Providence	74
10	Georgetown	56
6	Villanova	58
11	DePaul	57

Quarterfinals; Thursday, March 14; FS1
1	#2 UConn	87
9	Xavier	60
4	Seton Hall	72
5	St. John's	91
2	#8 Creighton	73
7	Providence	78
3	#10 Marquette	71*
6	Villanova	65

Semifinals; Friday, March 15; FOX/FS1
1	#2 UConn	95
5	St. John's	90
7	Providence	68
3	#10 Marquette	79

Championship; Saturday, March 16; FOX
1	#2 UConn	73
3	#10 Marquette	57

* denotes overtime period
