= 2023–24 St. John's Red Storm men's basketball team =

American college basketball season

2023–24 St. John's Red Storm men's basketball
- Conference: Big East Conference
- Record: 20–13 (11–9 Big East)
- Head coach: Rick Pitino (1st season)
- Associate head coach: Steve Masiello
- Assistant coaches: Ricky Johns; Van Macon; Bob Walsh; Taliek Brown
- Captain: Joel Soriano
- Home arena: Carnesecca Arena; Madison Square Garden

2023–24 Big East men's basketball standings
	Conf.				Overall
Team	W		L	PCT	W		L	PCT
No. 1 UConn †	18	–	2	.900	37	–	3	.925
No. 13 Creighton	14	–	6	.700	25	–	10	.714
No. 12 Marquette	14	–	6	.700	27	–	10	.730
Seton Hall	13	–	7	.650	25	–	12	.676
St. John's	11	–	9	.550	20	–	13	.606
Villanova	10	–	10	.500	18	–	16	.529
Providence	10	–	10	.500	21	–	14	.600
Butler	9	–	11	.450	18	–	15	.545
Xavier	9	–	11	.450	16	–	18	.471
Georgetown	2	–	18	.100	9	–	23	.281
DePaul	0	–	20	.000	3	–	29	.094
† 2024 Big East tournament winner Rankings from AP Poll

The 2023–24 St. John's Red Storm men's basketball team represented St. John's University during the 2023–24 NCAA Division I men's basketball season. They were coached by Rick Pitino, in his first year at the school, and played their home games at Carnesecca Arena and Madison Square Garden as members of the Big East Conference.

== Previous season ==
The Red Storm finished the season 17–14, 7–13 in Big East play to finish in eighth place. They defeated Butler in the opening round of the Big East tournament before losing in the quarterfinals to Marquette.

On March 10, 2023, the school fired head coach Mike Anderson for cause. Anderson disputed the assertion that his firing was for cause, and filed a notice of intent to arbitrate seeking the guaranteed money that was owed to him on his contract, as well as an additional $34.2 million in punitive damages. On March 20, the school named Hall of Famer Rick Pitino as the team's new head coach.

== Offseason ==
=== Departures ===
Name	Number	Pos.	Height	Weight	Year	Hometown	Reason for departure
Posh Alexander	0	G	6'0"	200	Junior	Brooklyn, NY	Transferred to Butler
AJ Storr	2	G	6'6"	200	Freshman	Rockford, IL	Transferred to Wisconsin
André Curbelo	3	G	6'1"	175	Junior	Vega Baja, PR	Transferred to Southern Miss
O'Mar Stanley	4	F	6'8"	230	Sophomore	Overland Park, KS	Transferred to Boise State
Dylan Addae-Wusu	5	G	6'4"	230	Junior	Bronx, NY	Transferred to Seton Hall
Montez Mathis	10	G	6'4"	210	RS senior	Baltimore, MD	Graduated
Kolby King	12	G	6'2"	175	Freshman	Pembroke Pines, FL	Transferred to Tulane
Jason Simpson	13	G	5'10"	155	Sophomore	West Palm Beach, FL	Walk-on; transferred to Florida State
Parker Williams	14	G	6'0"	180	Freshman	Birmingham, AL	Walk-on; transferred
Esahia Nyiwe	22	F	6'10"	220	Senior	Omaha, NE	Graduated
David Jones	23	F	6'6"	210	Junior	Santo Domingo, DR	Transferred to Memphis
Rafael Pinzon	24	G	6'6"	195	Sophomore	Arecibo, PR	Transferred to Bryant
Mohamed Keita	34	C	7'1"	220	Freshman	Conakry, Guinea	Transferred to Tulsa

=== Incoming transfers ===
Name	Num	Pos	Height	Weight	Year	Hometown	Previous school
Cruz Davis	0	G	6'3"	170	Sophomore	Plano, TX	Iona (3 yrs immediate eligibility)
Sadiku Ibine Ayo	2	F	6'7"	210	Sophomore	Asabi-Kumasi, Ghana	Iona (3 yrs immediate eligibility)
Jordan Dingle	3	G	6'3"	195	Senior	Valley Stream, NY	Penn (1 yr immediate eligibility)
Nahiem Alleyne	4	G	6'4"	195	GS senior	Buford, GA	UConn (1 yr immediate eligibility)
Daniss Jenkins	5	G	6'3"	175	GS senior	Dallas, TX	Iona (1 yr immediate eligibility)
Chris Ledlum	8	G/F	6'6"	225	GS senior	Brooklyn, NY	Harvard (1 yr immediate eligibility)
RJ Luis Jr.	12	G	6'7"	196	Sophomore	Miami, FL	UMass (3 yrs immediate eligibility)
Zuby Ejiofor	24	F	6'8"	220	Sophomore	Garland, TX	Kansas (3 yrs immediate eligibility)
Sean Conway	30	G	6'4"	200	GS senior	Fairfield, CT	VMI (1 yr immediate eligibility)
Glenn Taylor Jr.	35	F	6'6"	200	Junior	Las Vegas, NV	Oregon State (2 yrs immediate eligibility)

=== Recruiting classes ===
==== 2023 recruiting class ====
College recruiting
Name	Hometown	School	Height	Weight	Commit date
Simeon Wilcher #8 PG	Plainfield, NJ	Roselle Catholic High School	6 ft 3 in (1.91 m)	185 lb (84 kg)	Jul 12, 2023
Simeon Wilcher #8 PG	Recruit ratings: Rivals: 247Sports: ESPN: (88)				
Brady Dunlap #16 SF	Newhall, CA	Harvard Westlake High School	6 ft 7 in (2.01 m)	175 lb (79 kg)	May 2, 2023
Brady Dunlap #16 SF	Recruit ratings: Rivals: 247Sports: ESPN: (83)				
Overall recruit ranking:
Note: In many cases, Scout, Rivals, 247Sports, On3, and ESPN may conflict in their listings of height and weight.; In these cases, the average was taken. ESPN grades are on a 100-point scale.; Sources: "2023 Team Ranking". Rivals.

==== 2024 recruiting class ====
College recruiting (2024)
Name	Hometown	School	Height	Weight	Commit date
Jaiden Glover; SF	Elizabeth, NJ	The Patrick School	6 ft 5 in (1.96 m)	180 lb (82 kg)	Sep 12, 2023
Jaiden Glover; SF	Recruit ratings: Rivals: 247Sports: ESPN: (85)				
Khaman Maker; C	Las Vegas, NV	Trinity International School	7 ft 0 in (2.13 m)	205 lb (93 kg)	Sep 18, 2023
Khaman Maker; C	Recruit ratings: Rivals: 247Sports: ESPN: (80)				
Lefteris Liotopoulos; SG	Greece, EUR	DEKA Academy	6 ft 5 in (1.96 m)	N/A	May 23, 2023
Lefteris Liotopoulos; SG	Recruit ratings: Rivals: 247Sports: ESPN: (NR)				
Overall recruit ranking:
Note: In many cases, Scout, Rivals, 247Sports, On3, and ESPN may conflict in their listings of height and weight.; In these cases, the average was taken. ESPN grades are on a 100-point scale.; Sources: "2024 Team Ranking". Rivals.

== Roster ==
2023–24 St. John's Red Storm men's basketball team
Players
Coaches

Pos.	#	Name	Height	Weight	Year	Previous school	Hometown
G	0	Cruz Davis (injured)	6 ft 3 in (1.91 m)	172 lb (78 kg)	So	Iona	Plano, TX
F	2	Sadiku Ibine Ayo	6 ft 6 in (1.98 m)	205 lb (93 kg)	So	Iona	Asabi-Kumasi, Ghana
G	3	Jordan Dingle	6 ft 3 in (1.91 m)	196 lb (89 kg)	Sr	Pennsylvania	Valley Stream, NY
G	4	Nahiem Alleyne	6 ft 4 in (1.93 m)	200 lb (91 kg)	GS	Connecticut	Buford, GA
G	5	Daniss Jenkins	6 ft 3 in (1.91 m)	175 lb (79 kg)	GS	Iona	Dallas, TX
G	7	Simeon Wilcher	6 ft 4 in (1.93 m)	180 lb (82 kg)	Fr	Roselle Catholic	Plainfield, NJ
G/F	8	Chris Ledlum	6 ft 6 in (1.98 m)	225 lb (102 kg)	GS	Harvard	Brooklyn, NY
F	11	Joel Soriano (C)	6 ft 11 in (2.11 m)	255 lb (116 kg)	GS	Fordham	Yonkers, NY
G	12	RJ Luis Jr.	6 ft 7 in (2.01 m)	196 lb (89 kg)	So	UMass	Miami, FL
F	24	Zuby Ejiofor	6 ft 9 in (2.06 m)	237 lb (108 kg)	So	Kansas	Garland, TX
G	30	Sean Conway	6 ft 4 in (1.93 m)	200 lb (91 kg)	GS	VMI	Fairfield, CT
F	35	Glenn Taylor Jr.	6 ft 6 in (1.98 m)	205 lb (93 kg)	Jr	Oregon State	Las Vegas, NV
F	44	Brady Dunlap	6 ft 7 in (2.01 m)	190 lb (86 kg)	Fr	Harvard-Westlake	Newhall, CA
F	55	Drissa Traore	6 ft 8 in (2.03 m)	215 lb (98 kg)	RS So	Long Island Lutheran	New York City, NY

Head coach

- Rick Pitino (UMass)

Assistant coach(es)

- Steve Masiello (Kentucky)
- Ricky Johns (Monroe)
- Van Macon (Southampton)

Legend

- (C) Team captain
- (S) Suspended
- (I) Ineligible
- (W) Walk-on
- Injured
- Current redshirt

Roster

== Schedule and results ==
Date time, TV	Rank^{#}	Opponent^{#}	Result	Record	High points	High rebounds	High assists	Site (attendance) city, state
Exhibition
October 21, 2023*; 2:00 p.m., –		Rutgers; Dick Vitale Pediatric Cancer Research Fund Game	W 89–78 ^{2OT}	–	19 – Alleyne	16 – Soriano	9 – Jenkins	Carnesecca Arena (3,011); Queens, NY
October 29, 2023*; 3:30 p.m., –		Pace	L 59–63	–	22 – Alleyne	12 – Ledlum	3 – Jenkins	Carnesecca Arena (4,916); Queens, NY
Regular season
November 7, 2023*; 7:00 p.m., FS1		Stony Brook	W 90–74	1–0	22 – Soriano	14 – Ledlum	8 – Jenkins	Carnesecca Arena (5,602); Queens, NY
November 13, 2023*; 6:30 p.m., FS1		Michigan; Gavitt Tipoff Games	L 73–89	1–1	15 – Soriano	9 – Soriano	3 – Tied	Madison Square Garden (14,188); New York, NY
November 16, 2023*; 1:30 p.m., ESPNU		vs. North Texas; Shriners Children's Charleston Classic quarterfinals	W 53–52	2–1	17 – Jenkins	12 – Soriano	3 – Jenkins	TD Arena (3,879); Charleston, SC
November 17, 2023*; 2:00 p.m., ESPN2		vs. Dayton; Shriners Children's Charleston Classic semifinals	L 81–88	2–2	21 – Soriano	9 – Tied	8 – Jenkins	TD Arena (3,927); Charleston, SC
November 19, 2023*; 5:30 p.m., ESPN		vs. Utah; Shriners Children's Charleston Classic 3rd place	W 91–82	3–2	19 – Jenkins	15 – Soriano	8 – Jenkins	TD Arena (3,841); Charleston, SC
November 25, 2023*; 7:00 p.m., FS2		Holy Cross	W 91–45	4–2	16 – Soriano	7 – Ejiofor	6 – Jenkins	Carnesecca Arena (5,602); Queens, NY
December 1, 2023*; 7:00 p.m., ESPN2		at West Virginia; Big East–Big 12 Battle	W 79–73	5–2	24 – Soriano	10 – Ledlum	5 – Jenkins	WVU Coliseum (10,781); Morgantown, WV
December 6, 2023*; 7:00 p.m., CBSSN		Sacred Heart	W 85–50	6–2	18 – Soriano	13 – Soriano	6 – Soriano	Carnesecca Arena (5,602); Queens, NY
December 10, 2023*; 4:30 p.m., ESPNU		vs. Boston College; NABC Brooklyn Showcase	L 80–86	6–3	21 – Soriano	11 – Tied	8 – Jenkins	Barclays Center (6,072); Brooklyn, NY
December 16, 2023*; 3:30 p.m., FS1		Fordham; Madison Square Garden Holiday Festival/Rivalry	W 77–55	7–3	22 – Soriano	10 – Soriano	8 – Jenkins	Madison Square Garden (12,720); New York, NY
December 20, 2023; 7:00 p.m., FS1		Xavier	W 81–66	8–3 (1–0)	18 – Soriano	14 – Soriano	5 – Tied	Carnesecca Arena (5,602); Queens, NY
December 23, 2023; 8:00 p.m., FOX		at No. 5 UConn	L 65–69	8–4 (1–1)	14 – Soriano	11 – Soriano	4 – Jenkins	XL Center (15,684); Hartford, CT
December 30, 2023*; 12:00 p.m., FS1		Hofstra	W 84–79	9–4	21 – Jenkins	10 – Luis Jr.	8 – Jenkins	UBS Arena (7,486); Elmont, NY
January 2, 2024; 8:30 p.m., FS1		Butler	W 86–70	10–4 (2–1)	17 – Jenkins	12 – Soriano	7 – Jenkins	Carnesecca Arena (5,602); Queens, NY
January 6, 2024; 1:00 p.m., FOX		at Villanova	W 81–71	11–4 (3–1)	20 – Soriano	8 – Soriano	5 – Jenkins	Finneran Pavilion (6,501); Villanova, PA
January 10, 2024; 6:30 p.m., FS1		Providence	W 75–73	12–4 (4–1)	16 – Tied	8 – Luis	8 – Jenkins	Madison Square Garden (11,832); New York, NY
January 13, 2024; 1:00 p.m., FOX		at No. 22 Creighton	L 65–66	12–5 (4–2)	13 – Soriano	11 – Soriano	5 – Jenkins	CHI Health Center Omaha (17,164); Omaha, NE
January 16, 2024; 8:30 p.m., FS1		at Seton Hall	L 65–80	12–6 (4–3)	17 – Jenkins	7 – Taylor Jr.	5 – Jenkins	Prudential Center (9,204); Newark, NJ
January 20, 2024; 12:00 p.m., FOX		No. 17 Marquette	L 72–73	12–7 (4–4)	20 – Luis	11 – Ledlum	4 – Tied	Madison Square Garden (12,214); New York, NY
January 24, 2024; 8:30 p.m., FS1		Villanova	W 70–50	13–7 (5–4)	21 – Soriano	9 – Soriano	6 – Jenkins	Madison Square Garden (12.859); New York, NY
January 31, 2024; 6:30 p.m., FS1		at Xavier	L 77–88	13–8 (5–5)	25 – Jenkins	15 – Soriano	3 – Alleyne	Cintas Center (10,360); Cincinnati, OH
February 3, 2024; 12:00 p.m., FOX		No. 1 UConn	L 64–77	13–9 (5–6)	19 – Jenkins	5 – Luis	6 – Jenkins	Madison Square Garden (19,812); New York, NY
February 6, 2024; 6:30 p.m., FS1		DePaul	W 85–57	14–9 (6–6)	14 – Tied	10 – Ledlum	4 – Tied	UBS Arena (6,035); Elmont, NY
February 10, 2024; 6:00 p.m., FS1		at No. 7 Marquette	L 75–86	14–10 (6–7)	22 – Jenkins	7 – Tied	6 – Jenkins	Fiserv Forum (18,095); Milwaukee, WI
February 13, 2024; 7:00 p.m., CBSSN		at Providence	L 72–75	14–11 (6–8)	16 – Luis Jr.	14 – Luis Jr.	3 – Jenkins	Amica Mutual Pavilion (10,258); Providence, RI
February 18, 2024; 5:00 p.m., FS1		Seton Hall	L 62–68	14–12 (6–9)	17 – Jenkins	12 – Soriano	6 – Jenkins	UBS Arena (9,584); Elmont, NY
February 21, 2024; 7:00 p.m., FS1		at Georgetown; Rivalry	W 90–85	15–12 (7–9)	22 – Dingle	10 – Soriano	5 – Jenkins	Capital One Arena (4,839); Washington, D.C.
February 25, 2024; 12:00 p.m., CBS		No. 15 Creighton; Johnnies Day	W 80–66	16–12 (8–9)	27 – Jenkins	10 – Taylor Jr.	6 – Tied	Madison Square Garden (12,061); New York, NY
February 28, 2024; 8:30 p.m., CBSSN		at Butler	W 82–59	17–12 (9–9)	17 – Taylor Jr.	13 – Soriano	9 – Jenkins	Hinkle Fieldhouse (7,279); Indianapolis, IN
March 5, 2024; 9:00 p.m., FS1		at DePaul	W 104–77	18–12 (10–9)	19 – Tied	8 – Ledlum	6 – Dingle	Wintrust Arena (2,824); Chicago, IL
March 9, 2024; 12:00 p.m., FOX		Georgetown; Rivalry	W 86–78	19–12 (11–9)	23 – Jenkins	10 – Soriano	7 – Jenkins	Madison Square Garden (16,127); New York, NY
Big East tournament
March 14, 2024; 2:30 p.m., FS1	(5)	vs. (4) Seton Hall; Quarterfinal	W 91–72	20–12	18 – Luis Jr.	12 – Soriano	4 – Tied	Madison Square Garden (19,812); New York, NY
March 15, 2024; 5:30 p.m., FOX	(5)	vs. (1) No. 2 UConn; Semifinal	L 90–95	20–13	27 – Jenkins	9 – Soriano	5 – Jenkins	Madison Square Garden (19,812); New York, NY
National Invitation Tournament
Declined invitation
*Non-conference game. ^{#}Rankings from AP Poll. (#) Tournament seedings in parentheses. All times are in Eastern Time.

== Awards and honors ==
Preseason honors
Honors	Player	Position	Date awarded	Ref.
Preseason All-Big East First Team	Joel Soriano	C	October 24, 2023	

Postseason honors
Honors	Player	Position	Date awarded	Ref.
All-Big East Second Team	Daniss Jenkins	G	March 10, 2024	
All-Met First Team	Daniss Jenkins	G	April 17, 2024	
All-Met First Team	Joel Soriano	C	April 17, 2024	
