= Daniss Jenkins =

American basketball player (born 2001)

- Jenkins with the Detroit Pistons in 2026

No. 24 – Detroit Pistons
- Position: Point guard
- League: NBA

Personal information
- Born: August 17, 2001 (age 25) Dallas, Texas, U.S.
- Listed height: 6 ft 4 in (1.93 m)
- Listed weight: 165 lb (75 kg)

Career information
- High school: Hillcrest (Dallas, Texas)
- College: Pacific (2019–2021); Odessa College (2021–2022); Iona (2022–2023); St. John's (2023–2024)
- NBA draft: 2024: undrafted
- Playing career: 2024–present

Career history
- 2024–present: Detroit Pistons
- 2024–2026: →Motor City Cruise

Career highlights
- NBA G League All-Rookie Team (2025); Second-team All-Big East (2024); Second-team All-MAAC (2023); WCC All-Freshman Team (2020); First-team NJCAA All-American (2022)
- Stats at NBA.com
- Stats at Basketball Reference

Daniss Jenkins (pronounced DAY-niss; born August 17, 2001) is an American professional basketball player for the Detroit Pistons of the National Basketball Association (NBA). He played college basketball for the Pacific Tigers, Odessa Wranglers, Iona Gaels, and St. John's Red Storm. Jenkins signed a two-way contract with the Pistons after going undrafted in the 2024 NBA Draft, later signing a standard contract with the team.

== High school and college career ==
Jenkins attended Hillcrest High School in Dallas. In his senior year, The Dallas Morning News selected him as the District 12-4A offensive MVP. After graduation, he studied at University of the Pacific (2019–2021), Odessa College (2021–2022) and Iona (2022–2023) as an undergraduate and St. John's University (2023–2024) as a graduate student. During his freshman year at Pacific, Jenkins was named to the West Coast Conference All-Freshman team. In his final year playing for St. John's, Jenkins averaged 14.9 points, 3.5 rebounds, 5.4 assists, 1.7 triples and 1.6 steals per game on 44.6% shooting from the field and 85.1% at the line. Jenkins was also named to the All-Big East second team and was the only Red Storm player named to earn all-conference recognition at the end of the regular season.

== Professional career ==
After going undrafted in the 2024 NBA draft, Jenkins signed a two-way contract with the Detroit Pistons on July 6, 2024. He made seven appearances for Detroit during the 2024–25 NBA season, averaging 1.0 point, 0.3 rebounds, and 0.4 assists.

On August 3, 2025, Jenkins re-signed with the Pistons on another two-way contract. In a 137–135 win over the Washington Wizards on November 10, Jenkins broke out, scoring a then career-high 24 points, including the game-tying three-pointer at the end of regulation. He followed his performance with a game two days later, where he registered 18 points, 12 assists, and helped the Pistons to a win over the Chicago Bulls. The game was also Jenkins' first career start. On February 7, 2026, Jenkins' two-way contract was converted into a standard two-year contract worth $7.8 million.

On March 23, 2026, Jenkins put up a career-high 30 points, along with eight assists and four rebounds in a 113–110 win over the Los Angeles Lakers.

== Career statistics ==
Legend
| GP | Games played | GS | Games started | MPG | Minutes per game |
| FG% | Field goal percentage | 3P% | 3-point field goal percentage | FT% | Free throw percentage |
| RPG | Rebounds per game | APG | Assists per game | SPG | Steals per game |
| BPG | Blocks per game | PPG | Points per game | **Bold** | Career high |

=== NBA ===
==== Regular season ====
| Year | Team | GP | GS | MPG | FG% | 3P% | FT% | RPG | APG | SPG | BPG | PPG |
|---|---|---|---|---|---|---|---|---|---|---|---|---|
| 2024–25 | Detroit | 7 | 0 | 3.3 | .300 | .143 | .000 | .3 | .4 | .0 | .0 | 1.0 |
| 2025–26 | Detroit | **72** | **19** | **20.2** | **.408** | **.374** | **.832** | **2.3** | **3.9** | **.9** | **.2** | **9.3** |
| Career | | 79 | 19 | 18.7 | .407 | .366 | .822 | 2.1 | 3.6 | .8 | .2 | 8.6 |

==== Playoffs ====
| Year | Team | GP | GS | MPG | FG% | 3P% | FT% | RPG | APG | SPG | BPG | PPG |
|---|---|---|---|---|---|---|---|---|---|---|---|---|
| 2026 | Detroit | 14 | 3 | 22.7 | .361 | .271 | .774 | 2.6 | 3.0 | .4 | .4 | 9.1 |
| Career | | 14 | 3 | 22.7 | .361 | .271 | .774 | 2.6 | 3.0 | .4 | .4 | 9.1 |

=== College ===
| Year | Team | GP | GS | MPG | FG% | 3P% | FT% | RPG | APG | SPG | BPG | PPG |
|---|---|---|---|---|---|---|---|---|---|---|---|---|
| 2019–20 | Pacific | 32 | 23 | 22.1 | .338 | .246 | .821 | 1.2 | 1.2 | .5 | .4 | 6.2 |
| 2020–21 | Pacific | 18 | 18 | 31.3 | .416 | .233 | .721 | 3.2 | 2.1 | 1.2 | **.7** | 12.2 |
| 2021–22 | Did Not Play - Juco | | | | | | | | | | | |
| 2022–23 | Iona | **35** | **35** | **33.7** | .418 | **.361** | .786 | **4.4** | 4.9 | 1.4 | .6 | **15.6** |
| 2023–24 | St. John's | 33 | 33 | 30.7 | **.446** | .354 | **.851** | 3.5 | **5.4** | 1.6 | .5 | 14.9 |
| Career | | 118 | 109 | 29.3 | .414 | .329 | .799 | 3.1 | 3.6 | 1.2 | .5 | 12.3 |
