= 2023–24 UConn Huskies men's basketball team =

American college basketball season

2023–24 UConn Huskies men's basketball

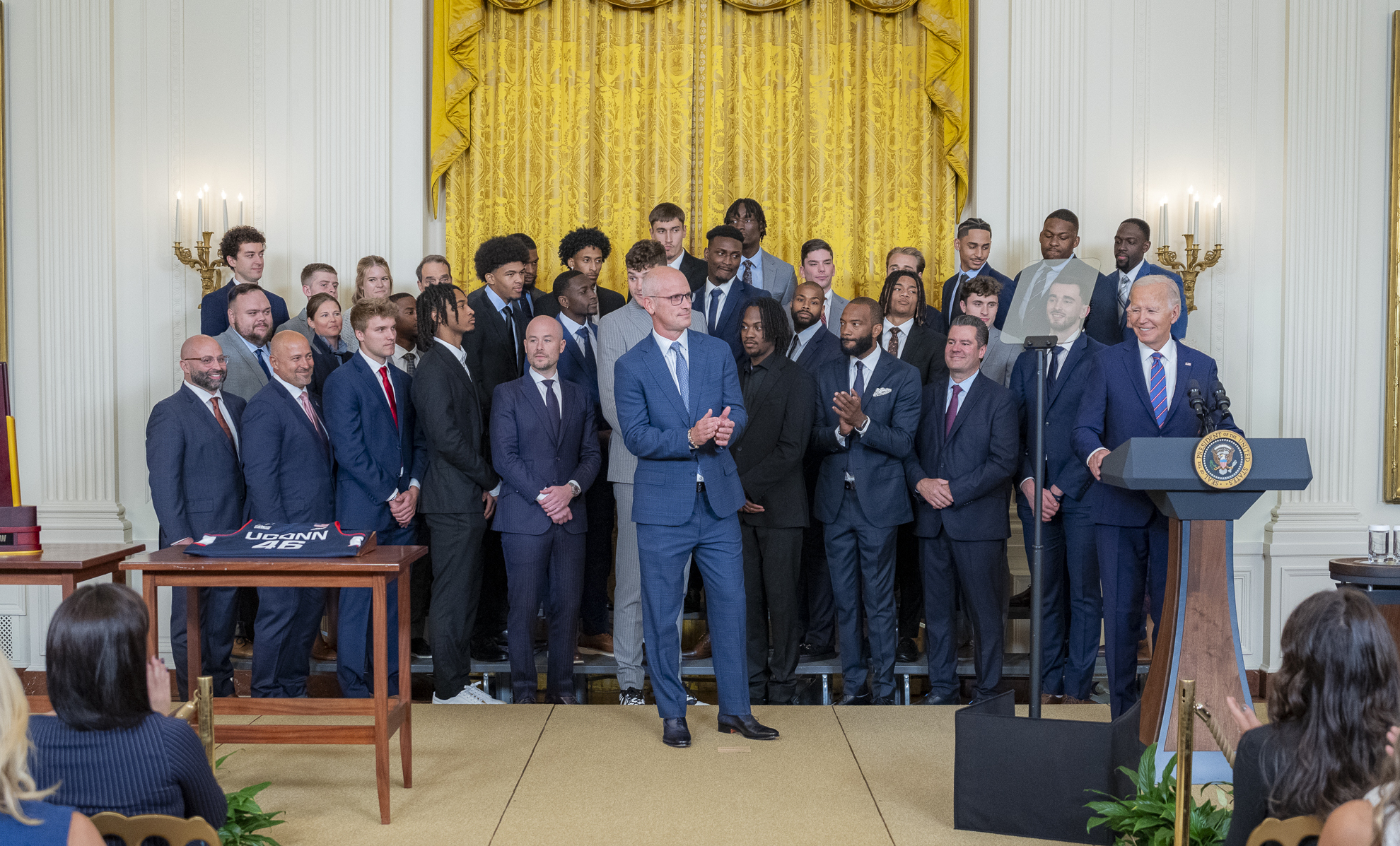

NCAA tournament National Champions Big East tournament champions Big East regular season champions Empire Classic champions

National Championship Game, W 75–60 vs. Purdue
- Conference: Big East Conference

Ranking
- Coaches: No. 1
- AP: No. 1
- Record: 37–3 (18–2 Big East)
- Head coach: Dan Hurley (6th season)
- Associate head coach: Kimani Young
- Assistant coaches: Tom Moore; Luke Murray
- Home arena: Harry A. Gampel Pavilion; XL Center

2023–24 Big East men's basketball standings
	Conf.				Overall
Team	W		L	PCT	W		L	PCT
No. 1 UConn †	18	–	2	.900	37	–	3	.925
No. 13 Creighton	14	–	6	.700	25	–	10	.714
No. 12 Marquette	14	–	6	.700	27	–	10	.730
Seton Hall	13	–	7	.650	25	–	12	.676
St. John's	11	–	9	.550	20	–	13	.606
Villanova	10	–	10	.500	18	–	16	.529
Providence	10	–	10	.500	21	–	14	.600
Butler	9	–	11	.450	18	–	15	.545
Xavier	9	–	11	.450	16	–	18	.471
Georgetown	2	–	18	.100	9	–	23	.281
DePaul	0	–	20	.000	3	–	29	.094
† 2024 Big East tournament winner Rankings from AP Poll

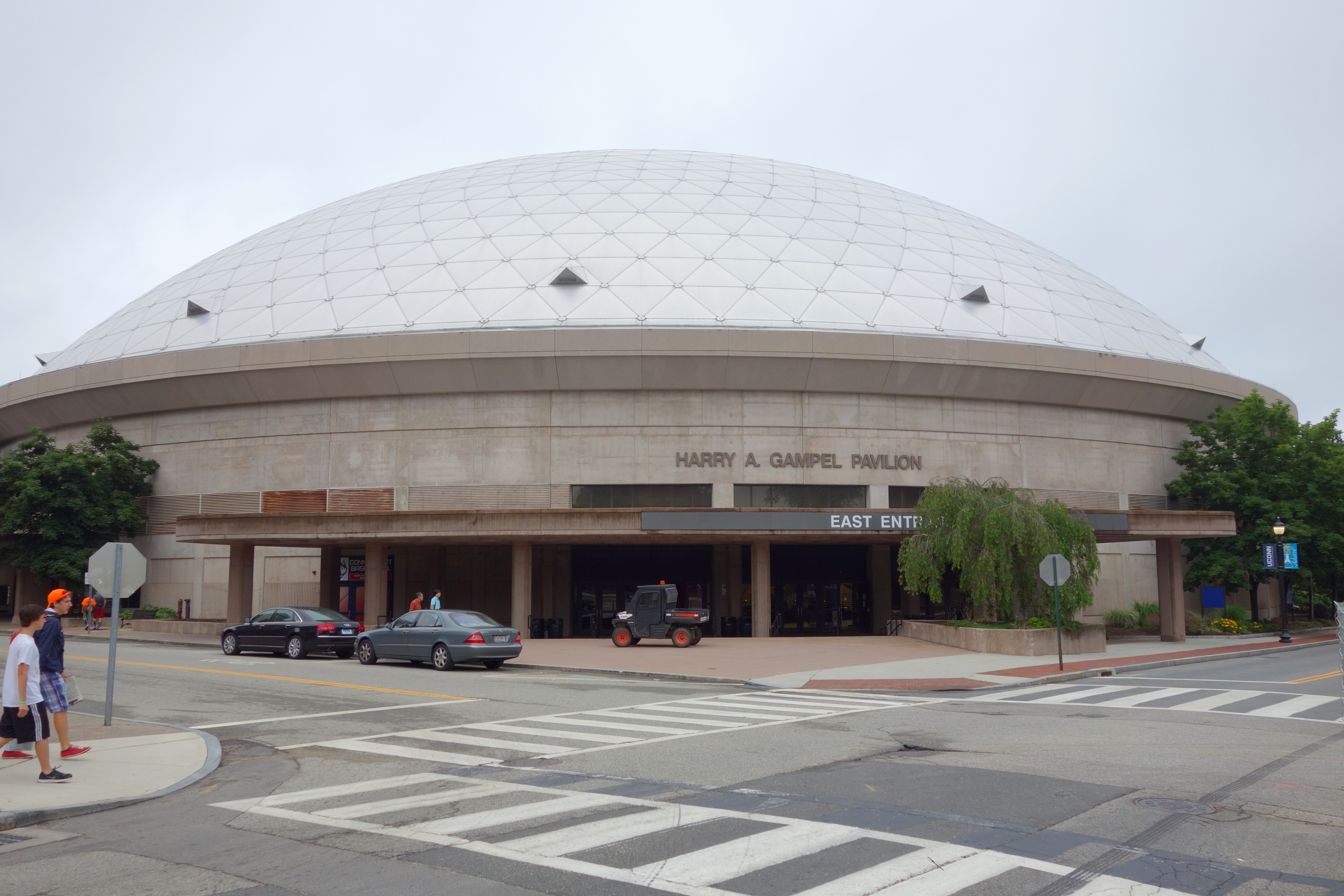
Harry A. Gampel Pavilion, where the Huskies played home games.

The 2023–24 UConn Huskies men's basketball team represented the University of Connecticut in the 2023–24 NCAA Division I men's basketball season. The Huskies were led by sixth-year head coach Dan Hurley in the team's fourth season since their return to the Big East Conference. The Huskies played their home games at the Harry A. Gampel Pavilion in Storrs, Connecticut and the XL Center in Hartford, Connecticut. The UConn Huskies men's basketball team drew an average home attendance of 12,733 in 16 games in 2023–24.

The Huskies finished the season 37–3, 18–2 in Big East play to win the regular season championship. They defeated Xavier, St. John's, and Marquette to win the Big East tournament, receiving the conference's automatic bid to the NCAA tournament. Receiving the No. 1 overall seed, they returned to the National Championship game for the second straight year and defeated Purdue to become the first back-to-back National Champions since Florida (who won the tournament in 2006 and 2007).

The season was marked by a number of records at both the program and national level. UConn set a program record for regular season wins (28) and total wins (37) in a season, and became the first Big East team to win 18 conference games. In the postseason, they became the first team since the tournament expanded to 64 teams in 1985 (therefore requiring six victories to win the championship) to win every game by at least 14 points, breaking their own record of winning every game by 13 points set the previous year. They set additional records in the NCAA tournament for largest combined margin of victory in all their tournament games with 140 points; and by extension, the largest average margin of victory of 23.3 points-per-game. This has led many to call them the best team in UConn history and among the best college basketball teams of all time.

== Previous season ==
The Huskies finished the season 31–8, 13–7 in Big East play to finish in a tie for fourth place. As the No. 4 seed in the Big East tournament, they defeated Providence in the quarterfinals before losing to Marquette in the semifinals. They received an at-large bid to the NCAA tournament as the No. 4 seed in the West region. They defeated Iona, Saint Mary's, Arkansas, and Gonzaga to advance to the school's sixth Final Four and first since 2014. They defeated Miami and San Diego State to win the national championship, the school's fifth title since 1999, and were only the fifth men's team to win all six of its games by 10 points or more.

== Offseason ==
=== Departures ===
Name	Number	Pos.	Height	Weight	Year	Hometown	Reason for departure
Joey Calcaterra	3	G	6'3"	180	GS Senior	Novato, CA	Graduated
Nahiem Alleyne	4	G	6'4"	195	Senior	Buford, GA	Graduate transferred to St. John's
Richie Springs	13	F	6'9"	235	RS Junior	Brooklyn, NY	Transferred to Quinnipiac
Adama Sanogo	21	F	6'9"	245	Junior	Bamako, Mali	Declare for 2023 NBA draft/undrafted; signed with Chicago Bulls
Jordan Hawkins	24	G	6'5"	195	Sophomore	Gaithersburg, MD	Declare for 2023 NBA draft; selected 14th overall by New Orleans Pelicans
Yarin Hasson	30	F	6'9"	205	Freshman	Gan Tavne, Israel	Transferred to Southern Indiana
Emmett Hendry	41	G	6'3"	155	Freshman	Brooklyn, NY	Walk-on; transferred to Cloud County Community
Andre Jackson Jr.	44	G	6'6"	210	Junior	Amsterdam, NY	Declare for 2023 NBA draft; selected 36th overall by Orlando Magic

=== Incoming transfers ===
Name	Number	Pos.	Height	Weight	Year	Hometown	Previous school
Cam Spencer	12	G	6'4"	207	GS Senior	Davidsonville, MD	Rutgers

=== Recruiting classes ===
==== 2023 recruiting class ====
College recruiting
Name	Hometown	School	Height	Weight	Commit date
Stephon Castle #5 PG	Covington, GA	Newton High School	6 ft 6 in (1.98 m)	190 lb (86 kg)	Nov 19, 2021
Stephon Castle #5 PG	Recruit ratings: Scout: Rivals: 247Sports: ESPN: (92)				
Solomon Ball #1 SG	Leesburg, VA	Brewster Academy	6 ft 2 in (1.88 m)	185 lb (84 kg)	Jul 1, 2022
Solomon Ball #1 SG	Recruit ratings: Scout: Rivals: 247Sports: ESPN: (88)				
Jayden Ross #23 SF	Bristow, VA	Long Island Lutheran High School	6 ft 6 in (1.98 m)	195 lb (88 kg)	Jun 27, 2022
Jayden Ross #23 SF	Recruit ratings: Scout: Rivals: 247Sports: ESPN: (83)				
Jaylin Stewart #3 SF	Seattle, WA	Garfield High School	6 ft 6 in (1.98 m)	215 lb (98 kg)	Sep 16, 2022
Jaylin Stewart #3 SF	Recruit ratings: Scout: Rivals: 247Sports: ESPN: (82)				
Youssouf Singare #24 C	Bronx, NY	Our Savior Lutheran High School	7 ft 0 in (2.13 m)	185 lb (84 kg)	Sep 21, 2022
Youssouf Singare #24 C	Recruit ratings: Scout: Rivals: 247Sports: ESPN: (82)				
Overall recruit ranking: Rivals: 4 247Sports: 4 ESPN: 5
Note: In many cases, Scout, Rivals, 247Sports, On3, and ESPN may conflict in their listings of height and weight.; In these cases, the average was taken. ESPN grades are on a 100-point scale.; Sources: "2023 UConn Basketball Commitments". Rivals.; "2023 Team Ranking". Rivals.

==== 2024 recruiting class ====
College recruiting (2024)
Name	Hometown	School	Height	Weight	Commit date
Liam McNeeley #10 SF	Richardson, TX	Montverde Academy	6 ft 8 in (2.03 m)	185 lb (84 kg)	Apr 26, 2024
Liam McNeeley #10 SF	Recruit ratings: Rivals: 247Sports: ESPN: (93)				
Ahmad Nowell #10 PG	Philadelphia, PA	Imhotep Institute Charter High School	6 ft 1 in (1.85 m)	180 lb (82 kg)	Jul 23, 2023
Ahmad Nowell #10 PG	Recruit ratings: Scout: Rivals: 247Sports: ESPN: (88)				
Isaiah Abraham #24 PF	Fairfax, VA	Paul VI High School	6 ft 7 in (2.01 m)	210 lb (95 kg)	Jul 14, 2023
Isaiah Abraham #24 PF	Recruit ratings: Scout: Rivals: 247Sports: ESPN: (88)				
Overall recruit ranking: Rivals: 10 247Sports: 11
Note: In many cases, Scout, Rivals, 247Sports, On3, and ESPN may conflict in their listings of height and weight.; In these cases, the average was taken. ESPN grades are on a 100-point scale.; Sources: "2024 UConn Basketball Commitments". Rivals.; "2024 Team Ranking". Rivals.

== Roster ==
2023–24 UConn Huskies men's basketball team
Players
Coaches

Pos.	#	Name	Height	Weight	Year	Previous school	Hometown
G	1	Solo Ball	6 ft 3 in (1.91 m)	185 lb (84 kg)	Fr	Brewster Academy	Leesburg, VA
G	2	Tristen Newton	6 ft 5 in (1.96 m)	195 lb (88 kg)	GS	East Carolina	El Paso, TX
F	3	Jaylin Stewart	6 ft 7 in (2.01 m)	205 lb (93 kg)	Fr	Garfield	Seattle, WA
G	5	Stephon Castle	6 ft 6 in (1.98 m)	215 lb (98 kg)	Fr	Newton	Covington, GA
G	10	Hassan Diarra	6 ft 2 in (1.88 m)	190 lb (86 kg)	Sr	Texas A&M	Queens, NY
F	11	Alex Karaban	6 ft 8 in (2.03 m)	220 lb (100 kg)	RS So	IMG Academy	Southborough, MA
G	12	Cam Spencer	6 ft 4 in (1.93 m)	205 lb (93 kg)	GS	Rutgers	Davidsonville, MD
G	20	Andrew Hurley (W)	6 ft 1 in (1.85 m)	170 lb (77 kg)	Sr	East Catholic	Glastonbury, CT
F	23	Jayden Ross	6 ft 7 in (2.01 m)	195 lb (88 kg)	Fr	Long Island Lutheran	Bristow, VA
C	24	Youssouf Singare	6 ft 10 in (2.08 m)	220 lb (100 kg)	Fr	Our Saviour Lutheran	Bamako, Mali
C	32	Donovan Clingan	7 ft 2 in (2.18 m)	280 lb (127 kg)	So	Bristol Central	Bristol, CT
G	33	Apostolos Roumoglou	6 ft 8 in (2.03 m)	215 lb (98 kg)	So	P.A.O.K. BC	Xanthi, Greece
F	35	Samson Johnson	6 ft 10 in (2.08 m)	225 lb (102 kg)	Jr	The Patrick School	Lomé, Togo
G	40	Andre Johnson Jr. (W)	6 ft 4 in (1.93 m)	170 lb (77 kg)	So	South Kent School	Bristol, CT

Head coach

- Dan Hurley (Seton Hall)

Assistant coach(es)

- Kimani Young (UTEP)
- Tom Moore (Boston University)
- Luke Murray (Fairfield)

Legend

- (C) Team captain
- (S) Suspended
- (I) Ineligible
- (W) Walk-on
- Injured
- Current redshirt

Roster

== Schedule and results ==
Date time, TV	Rank^{#}	Opponent^{#}	Result	Record	High points	High rebounds	High assists	Site (attendance) city, state
Non-conference regular season
November 6, 2023*; 6:30 p.m., FS1	No. 6	Northern Arizona	W 95–52	1–0	22 – Karaban	8 – Clingan	5 – Spencer	Harry A. Gampel Pavilion (10,299); Storrs, CT
November 11, 2023*; 12:00 p.m., FS2	No. 6	Stonehill	W 107–67	2–0	22 – Newton	8 – Castle	6 – Spencer	XL Center (14,606); Hartford, CT
November 14, 2023*; 7:00 p.m., FS2	No. 5	Mississippi Valley State	W 87–53	3–0	25 – Spencer	8 – Newton	7 – Newton	XL Center (13,298); Hartford, CT
November 19, 2023*; 1:00 p.m., ESPN	No. 5	vs. Indiana; Empire Classic semifinal	W 77–57	4–0	23 – Newton	11 – Newton	6 – 2 tied	Madison Square Garden (17,647); New York, NY
November 20, 2023*; 7:00 p.m., ESPNU	No. 5	vs. No. 15 Texas; Empire Classic Championship	W 81–71	5–0	20 – Karaban	8 – S. Johnson	8 – Newton	Madison Square Garden (10,988); New York, NY
November 24, 2023*; 2:00 p.m., FS1	No. 5	Manhattan	W 90–60	6–0	18 – Spencer	10 – Newton	13 – Newton	XL Center (15,006); Hartford, CT
November 27, 2023*; 7:00 p.m., CBSSN	No. 4	New Hampshire	W 84–64	7–0	29 – Clingan	10 – Newton	7 – Newton	Harry A. Gampel Pavilion (10,299); Storrs, CT
December 1, 2023*; 9:00 p.m., ESPN2	No. 4	at No. 5 Kansas; Big East–Big 12 Battle	L 65–69	7–1	31 – Newton	7 – Clingan	2 – 4 tied	Allen Fieldhouse (16,300); Lawrence, KS
December 5, 2023*; 9:00 p.m., ESPN	No. 5	vs. No. 9 North Carolina; Jimmy V Classic	W 87–76	8–1	23 – Spencer	9 – Karaban	6 – Spencer	Madison Square Garden (17,873); New York, NY
December 9, 2023*; 12:00 p.m., FS2	No. 5	Arkansas–Pine Bluff	W 101–63	9–1	26 – Karaban	7 – Tied	6 – Newton	Harry A. Gampel Pavilion (10,299); Storrs, CT
December 15, 2023*; 10:00 p.m., ESPN2	No. 5	vs. No. 10 Gonzaga; Continental Tire Seattle Tip-Off	W 76–63	10–1	21 – Clingan	8 – Clingan	5 – Newton	Climate Pledge Arena (16,405); Seattle, WA
Big East regular season
December 20, 2023; 7:00 p.m., CBSSN	No. 5	at Seton Hall	L 60–75	10–2 (0–1)	16 – Newton	8 – Karaban	3 – Tied	Prudential Center (9,441); Newark, NJ
December 23, 2023; 8:00 p.m., FOX	No. 5	St. John's	W 69–65	11–2 (1–1)	16 – S. Johnson	9 – Newton	6 – Newton	XL Center (15,684); Hartford, CT
January 2, 2024; 6:30 p.m., FS1	No. 4	DePaul	W 85–56	12–2 (2–1)	20 – Spencer	7 – Karaban	7 – Tied	Harry A. Gampel Pavilion (10,299); Storrs, CT
January 5, 2024; 6:30 p.m., FS1	No. 4	at Butler	W 88–81	13–2 (3–1)	20 – Karaban	9 – Castle	5 – Newton	Hinkle Fieldhouse (9,162); Indianapolis, IN
January 10, 2024; 8:30 p.m., FS1	No. 4	at Xavier	W 80–75	14–2 (4–1)	19 – Spencer	6 – 3 tied	11 – Newton	Cintas Center (10,335); Cincinnati, OH
January 14, 2024; 12:00 p.m., FOX	No. 4	Georgetown; Rivalry	W 80–67	15–2 (5–1)	26 – Karaban	7 – Tied	8 – Newton	XL Center (15,684); Hartford, CT
January 17, 2024; 7:00 p.m., FS1	No. 1	No. 18 Creighton	W 62–48	16–2 (6–1)	16 – Newton	8 – Tied	5 – Newton	Harry A. Gampel Pavilion (10,299); Storrs, CT
January 20, 2024; 8:00 p.m., FS1	No. 1	at Villanova	W 66–65	17–2 (7–1)	25 – Newton	7 – Clingan	3 – 3 tied	Wells Fargo Center (18,966); Philadelphia, PA
January 28, 2024; 12:00 p.m., FS1	No. 1	Xavier	W 99–56	18–2 (8–1)	22 – Newton	8 – Clingan	6 – Spencer	XL Center (15,684); Hartford, CT
January 31, 2024; 8:30 p.m., FS1	No. 1	Providence	W 74–65	19–2 (9–1)	20 – Castle	11 – Newton	3 – Newton	Harry A. Gampel Pavilion (10,299); Storrs, CT
February 3, 2024; 12:00 p.m., FOX	No. 1	at St. John's	W 77–64	20–2 (10–1)	23 – Spencer	10 – Newton	7 – Newton	Madison Square Garden (19,812); New York, NY
February 6, 2024; 8:30 p.m., FS1	No. 1	Butler	W 71–62	21–2 (11–1)	20 – Spencer	14 – Clingan	3 – 4 tied	XL Center (15,684); Hartford, CT
February 10, 2024; 12:00 p.m., FS1	No. 1	at Georgetown; Rivalry	W 89–64	22–2 (12–1)	25 – Karaban	6 – Tied	9 – Newton	Capital One Arena (13,040); Washington, D.C.
February 14, 2024; 9:00 p.m., CBSSN	No. 1	at DePaul	W 101–65	23–2 (13–1)	21 – Karaban	8 – Newton	6 – Castle	Wintrust Arena (3,465); Chicago, IL
February 17, 2024; 3:00 p.m., FOX	No. 1	No. 4 Marquette	W 81–53	24–2 (14–1)	17 – Clingan	10 – Clingan	8 – Newton	XL Center (15,684); Hartford, CT
February 20, 2024; 8:30 p.m., FS1	No. 1	at No. 15 Creighton	L 66–85	24–3 (14–2)	27 – Newton	12 – Newton	4 – Newton	CHI Health Center Omaha (18,071); Omaha, NE
February 24, 2024; 8:00 p.m., FOX	No. 1	Villanova; College GameDay	W 78–54	25–3 (15–2)	25 – Spencer	16 – Newton	10 – Newton	Harry A. Gampel Pavilion (10,299); Storrs, CT
March 3, 2024; 12:00 p.m., CBS	No. 3	Seton Hall	W 91–61	26–3 (16–2)	21 – Castle	11 – Clingan	10 – Newton	Harry A. Gampel Pavilion (10,299); Storrs, CT
March 6, 2024; 8:30 p.m., FS1	No. 2	at No. 8 Marquette	W 74–67	27–3 (17–2)	23 – Karaban	12 – Clingan	6 – Spencer	Fiserv Forum (17,837); Milwaukee, WI
March 9, 2024; 8:00 p.m., FOX	No. 2	at Providence	W 74–60	28–3 (18–2)	16 – Karaban	8 – Newton	5 – Tied	Amica Mutual Pavilion (12,608); Providence, RI
Big East tournament
March 14, 2024; 12:00 p.m., FS1	(1) No. 2	vs. (9) Xavier; Quarterfinal	W 87–60	29–3	13 – Tied	8 – Castle	8 – Spencer	Madison Square Garden (19,812); New York, NY
March 15, 2024; 5:30 p.m., FOX	(1) No. 2	vs. (5) St. John's; Semifinal	W 95–90	30–3	25 – Newton	6 – Tied	9 – Tied	Madison Square Garden (19,812); New York, NY
March 16, 2024; 6:30 p.m., FOX	(1) No. 2	vs. (3) No. 10 Marquette; Championship	W 73–57	31–3	22 – Clingan	16 – Clingan	10 – Newton	Madison Square Garden (19,812); New York, NY
NCAA Tournament
March 22, 2024*; 2:45 p.m., CBS	(1 E) No. 1	vs. (16 E) Stetson; First round	W 91–52	32–3	19 – Clingan	8 – Clingan	8 – Newton	Barclays Center (17,183); Brooklyn, NY
March 24, 2024*; 7:45 p.m., TruTV	(1 E) No. 1	vs. (9 E) Northwestern; Second round	W 75–58	33–3	20 – Newton	14 – Clingan	10 – Newton	Barclays Center (17,505); Brooklyn, NY
March 28, 2024; 7:39 p.m., TBS/TruTV	(1 E) No. 1	vs. (5 E) No. 24 San Diego State; Sweet Sixteen	W 82–52	34–3	18 – Spencer	11 – Castle	4 – Tied	TD Garden (19,144); Boston, MA
March 30, 2024; 6:09 p.m., TBS/TruTV	(1 E) No. 1	vs. (3 E) No. 10 Illinois; Elite Eight	W 77–52	35–3	22 – Clingan	12 – Spencer	5 – 3 tied	TD Garden (19,181); Boston, MA
April 6, 2024; 8:49 p.m., TBS/TNT/TruTV	(1 E) No. 1	vs. (4 W) No. 19 Alabama; Final Four	W 86–72	36–3	21 – Castle	8 – Tied	9 – Newton	State Farm Stadium (74,720); Glendale, AZ
April 8, 2024; 9:20 p.m., TBS/TNT/TruTV	(1 E) No. 1	vs. (1 MW) No. 3 Purdue; National Championship	W 75–60	37–3	20 – Newton	8 – Spencer	7 – Newton	State Farm Stadium (74,423); Glendale, AZ
*Non-conference game. ^{#}Rankings from AP Poll. (#) Tournament seedings in parentheses. E=East. W=West. MW=Midwest. All times are in Eastern Time.

== Rankings ==
Ranking movements Legend: ██ Increase in ranking ██ Decrease in ranking ( ) = First-place votes
	Week																				
Poll	Pre	1	2	3	4	5	6	7	8	9	10	11	12	13	14	15	16	17	18	19	Final
AP	6 (2)	5 (1)	5 (1)	4 (2)	5	5	5	5	4	4	1 (39)	1 (44)	1 (48)	1 (45)	1 (45)	1 (62)	3 (5)	2 (6)	2 (6)	1 (61)	1 (58)
Coaches	5 (1)	4	4	4	5	5	5	5	4	4	1 (20)	1 (24)	1 (23)	1 (25)	1 (24)	1 (32)	2 (3)	2 (3)	2	1 (32)	1 (32)

*No poll released

== See also ==
- 2023–24 UConn Huskies women's basketball team
