= 2023–24 Butler Bulldogs men's basketball team =

American college basketball season

2023–24 Butler Bulldogs men's basketball

NIT, First Round
- Conference: Big East Conference
- Record: 18–15 (9–11 Big East)
- Head coach: Thad Matta (2nd, 3rd overall season)
- Assistant coaches: Mike Pegues (2nd season); Maurice Joseph (2nd season); Alex Barlow (1st season)
- Home arena: Hinkle Fieldhouse

2023–24 Big East men's basketball standings
	Conf.				Overall
Team	W		L	PCT	W		L	PCT
No. 1 UConn †	18	–	2	.900	37	–	3	.925
No. 13 Creighton	14	–	6	.700	25	–	10	.714
No. 12 Marquette	14	–	6	.700	27	–	10	.730
Seton Hall	13	–	7	.650	25	–	12	.676
St. John's	11	–	9	.550	20	–	13	.606
Villanova	10	–	10	.500	18	–	16	.529
Providence	10	–	10	.500	21	–	14	.600
Butler	9	–	11	.450	18	–	15	.545
Xavier	9	–	11	.450	16	–	18	.471
Georgetown	2	–	18	.100	9	–	23	.281
DePaul	0	–	20	.000	3	–	29	.094
† 2024 Big East tournament winner Rankings from AP Poll

The 2023–24 Butler Bulldogs men's basketball team represented Butler University in the 2023–24 NCAA Division I men's basketball season. They were coached by Thad Matta, in the second year of his second stint as head coach of his alma mater. The Bulldogs played their home games at Hinkle Fieldhouse in Indianapolis, Indiana, as members of the Big East Conference.

== Previous season ==
The Bulldogs finished the 2022–23 season 14–18, 6–14 in Big East play to finish in ninth place. They were defeated by St. John's in the first round of the Big East tournament.

== Offseason ==
=== Departures ===
Name	Number	Pos.	Height	Weight	Year	Hometown	Reason for departure
DJ Hughes	0	F	6'6"	230	Sophomore	Indianapolis, IN	Transferred to East Tennessee State
Eric Hunter Jr.	2	G	6'4"	170	GS senior	Indianapolis, IN	Graduated
Chuck Harris	3	G	6'2"	200	Junior	Ashburn, VA	Transferred to SMU
Myles Wilmoth	11	F	6'9"	215	Junior	Chestnut Ridge, NY	Transferred to Hofstra
Myles Tate	12	G	6'0"	165	Junior	Roebuck, SC	Transferred to Appalachian State
Jayden Taylor	13	G	6'4"	195	Sophomore	Indianapolis, IN	Transferred to NC State
Pierce Thomas	14	G/F	6'5"	210	RS freshman	Brownsburg, IN	Transferred to Eastern Kentucky
Manny Bates	15	C	6'11"	240	GS senior	Fayetteville, NC	Graduated/went undrafted in 2023 NBA draft
Ali Ali	24	G/F	6'8"	205	Senior	Kendallville, IN	Graduate transferred to Akron
Simas Lukosius	41	G/F	6'7"	225	Sophomore	Kaunas, Lituania	Transferred to Cincinnati

=== Incoming transfers ===
Name	Number	Pos.	Height	Weight	Year	Hometown	Previous school	Seasons remaining
DJ Davis	4	G	6'1"	170	Senior	Moreno Valley, CA	UC Irvine	Two
Posh Alexander	5	G	6'0"	200	Senior	Brooklyn, NY	St. John's	Two
Jahmyl Telfort	11	G	6'7"	224	Senior	Boucherville, QC	Northeastern	Two
Landon Moore	14	G	6'3"	200	Sophomore	Bloomington, IL	Saint Francis (PA)	Three
Pierre Brooks II	21	G	6'6"	225	Junior	Detroit, MI	Michigan State	Two
Andre Screen	23	C	7'1"	261	Senior	Alexandria, VA	Bucknell	Two

=== Recruiting classes ===
==== 2023 recruiting class ====
College recruiting
Name	Hometown	School	Height	Weight	Commit date
Finley Bizjack #19 SG	Trophy Club, TX	Byron Nelson High School	6 ft 3 in (1.91 m)	170 lb (77 kg)	Jul 1, 2022
Finley Bizjack #19 SG	Recruit ratings: Rivals: 247Sports: ESPN:				
Boden Kapke; C	Victoria, MN	Holy Family Catholic High School	6 ft 11 in (2.11 m)	230 lb (100 kg)	Sep 10, 2022
Boden Kapke; C	Recruit ratings: Rivals: 247Sports: ESPN:				
Augusto Cassiá; PF	Salvador, Brazil	NBA Academy Latin America	6 ft 8 in (2.03 m)	178 lb (81 kg)	Apr 1, 2023
Augusto Cassiá; PF	Recruit ratings: Rivals: 247Sports: ESPN:				
Overall recruit ranking:
Note: In many cases, Scout, Rivals, 247Sports, On3, and ESPN may conflict in their listings of height and weight.; In these cases, the average was taken. ESPN grades are on a 100-point scale.; Sources: "ESPN – Butler Bulldogs Men's Basketball Recruiting". ESPN.

==== 2024 recruiting class ====
College recruiting (2024)
Name	Hometown	School	Height	Weight	Commit date
Evan Haywood; SG	Indianapolis, IN	Brebeuf Jesuit Preparatory School	6 ft 4 in (1.93 m)	180 lb (82 kg)	Aug 13, 2023
Evan Haywood; SG	Recruit ratings: Rivals: 247Sports: ESPN:				
Colt Langdon; PF	Raleigh, NC	Millbrook High School	6 ft 7 in (2.01 m)	205 lb (93 kg)	Jul 10, 2024
Colt Langdon; PF	Recruit ratings: Rivals: 247Sports: ESPN:				
Overall recruit ranking:
Note: In many cases, Scout, Rivals, 247Sports, On3, and ESPN may conflict in their listings of height and weight.; In these cases, the average was taken. ESPN grades are on a 100-point scale.; Sources: "ESPN – Butler Bulldogs Men's Basketball Recruiting". ESPN.

== Roster ==
2023–24 Butler Bulldogs men's basketball team
Players
Coaches

Pos.	#	Name	Height	Weight	Year	Previous school	Hometown
F/C	35	John-Michael Mulloy	6 ft 10 in (2.08 m)	235 lb (107 kg)	RS Sr	Carmel	Carmel, IN
F/C	1	Jalen Thomas	6 ft 10 in (2.08 m)	240 lb (109 kg)	GS	Georgia State	Detroit, MI
G	4	DJ Davis	6 ft 1 in (1.85 m)	175 lb (79 kg)	Sr	UC Irvine	Moreno Valley, CA
G	5	Posh Alexander	6 ft 0 in (1.83 m)	205 lb (93 kg)	Sr	St. John's	Brooklyn, NY
F	11	Jahmyl Telfort	6 ft 7 in (2.01 m)	225 lb (102 kg)	Sr	Northeastern	Boucherville, QC
C	23	Andre Screen	7 ft 1 in (2.16 m)	255 lb (116 kg)	Sr	Bucknell	Alexandria, VA
G	2	Artemios Gavalas (W)	6 ft 0 in (1.83 m)	180 lb (82 kg)	RS Jr	St. John's	Southampton, NY
G/F	21	Pierre Brooks II	6 ft 6 in (1.98 m)	240 lb (109 kg)	Jr	Michigan State	Detroit, MI
F/C	22	Connor Turnbull	6 ft 10 in (2.08 m)	225 lb (102 kg)	So	Fort Zumwalt North	St. Paul, MO
G	14	Landon Moore	6 ft 3 in (1.91 m)	200 lb (91 kg)	So	Saint Francis (PA)	Bloomington, IL
G	13	Finley Bizjack	6 ft 4 in (1.93 m)	195 lb (88 kg)	Fr	Byron Nelson	Trophy Club, TX
F/C	33	Boden Kapke	6 ft 11 in (2.11 m)	255 lb (116 kg)	Fr	Holy Family Catholic	Victoria, MN
F	0	Augusto Cassia	6 ft 8 in (2.03 m)	220 lb (100 kg)	Fr	NBA Global Academy (Australia)	Salvador, Brazil
G	3	Ethan McComb (W)	6 ft 1 in (1.85 m)	185 lb (84 kg)	Fr	Center Grove	Greenwood, IN

Head coach

- Thad Matta (Butler)

Assistant coach(es)

- Mike Pegues (Delaware)
- Maurice Joseph (Vermont)
- Alex Barlow (Butler)

Legend

- (C) Team captain
- (S) Suspended
- (I) Ineligible
- (W) Walk-on
- Injured
- Current redshirt

Roster

== Schedule and results ==
Date time, TV	Rank^{#}	Opponent^{#}	Result	Record	High points	High rebounds	High assists	Site (attendance) city, state
Exhibition
October 28, 2023*; 7:30 p.m.		Ohio Northern	W 78–46		13 – Davis	5 – Tied	3 – Tied	Hinkle Fieldhouse (6,121); Indianapolis, IN
November 1, 2023*; 7:00 p.m.		Franklin (IN)	W 91–54		16 – Telfort	7 – Tied	5 – Moore	Hinkle Fieldhouse (5,877); Indianapolis, IN
Non-conference regular season
November 6, 2023*; 8:00 p.m., FS1		Eastern Michigan	W 94–55	1–0	18 – Telfort	7 – Thomas	8 – Alexander	Hinkle Fieldhouse (6,792); Indianapolis, IN
November 10, 2023*; 8:30 p.m., FS2		Southeast Missouri State	W 91–56	2–0	15 – Alexander	9 – Thomas	5 – Bizjack	Hinkle Fieldhouse (7,072); Indianapolis, IN
November 13, 2023*; 7:00 p.m., CBSSN		East Tennessee State	W 81–47	3–0	15 – Davis	6 – Tied	4 – Tied	Hinkle Fieldhouse (6,511); Indianapolis, IN
November 17, 2023*; 6:30 p.m., FS1		at No. 18 Michigan State; Gavitt Tipoff Games	L 54–74	3–1	15 – Telfort	6 – Telfort	2 – Alexander	Breslin Center (14,797); East Lansing, MI
November 23, 2023*; 2:30 p.m., ESPN2		vs. No. 19 Florida Atlantic; ESPN Events Invitational quarterfinals	L 86–91	3–2	19 – Telfort	8 – Screen	9 – Alexander	State Farm Field House (3,061); Bay Lake, FL
November 24, 2023*; 1:30 p.m., ESPN+		vs. Penn State; ESPN Events Invitational consolation 2nd round	W 88–78	4–2	26 – Brooks	8 – Tied	3 – Tied	State Farm Field House (2,194); Bay Lake, FL
November 26, 2023*; 4:00 p.m., ESPN2		vs. Boise State; ESPN Events Invitational	W 70–56	5–2	25 – Brooks	9 – Thomas	5 – Telfort	State Farm Field House (234); Bay Lake, FL
November 30, 2023*; 6:30 p.m., FS1		Texas Tech; Big East–Big 12 Battle	W 103–95 ^{OT}	6–2	26 – Telfort	10 – Alexander	11 – Alexander	Hinkle Fieldhouse (7,893); Indianapolis, IN
December 5, 2023*; 8:30 p.m., FS1		Buffalo	W 72–59	7–2	18 – Tied	10 – Thomas	8 – Telfort	Hinkle Fieldhouse (6,262); Indianapolis, IN
December 9, 2023*; 12:00 p.m., FS1		California	W 97–90 ^{2OT}	8–2	21 – Alexander	7 – Brooks	6 – Alexander	Hinkle Fieldhouse (8,032); Indianapolis, IN
December 15, 2023*; 7:00 p.m., FS1		Saginaw Valley State	W 96–70	9–2	17 – Bizjack	8 – Thomas	5 – Tied	Hinkle Fieldhouse (6,431); Indianapolis, IN
Big East regular season
December 19, 2023; 6:30 p.m., FS1		Georgetown	W 74–64	10–2 (1–0)	13 – Tied	8 – Thomas	7 – Alexander	Hinkle Fieldhouse (6,915); Indianapolis, IN
December 23, 2023; 12:00 p.m., FS1		at Providence	L 75–85 ^{OT}	10–3 (1–1)	22 – Davis	10 – Alexander	2 – Tied	Amica Mutual Pavilion (11,602); Providence, RI
January 2, 2024; 8:30 p.m., FS1		at St. John's	L 70–86	10–4 (1–2)	25 – Davis	7 – Brooks	5 – Alexander	Carnesecca Arena (5,602); Queens, NY
January 5, 2024; 6:30 p.m., FS1		No. 4 UConn	L 81–88	10–5 (1–3)	22 – Davis	6 – Screen	6 – Alexander	Hinkle Fieldhouse (9,163); Indianapolis, IN
January 10, 2024; 9:00 p.m., CBSSN		at No. 11 Marquette	W 69–62	11–5 (2–3)	14 – Tied	14 – Thomas	7 – Alexander	Fiserv Forum (14,858); Milwaukee, WI
January 13, 2024; 12:00 p.m., FS1		Seton Hall	L 72–78	11–6 (2–4)	17 – Alexander	7 – Thomas	4 – Tied	Hinkle Fieldhouse (7,777); Indianapolis, IN
January 16, 2024; 6:30 p.m., FS1		at Xavier	L 71–85	11–7 (2–5)	22 – Brooks	10 – Thomas	5 – Alexander	Cintas Center (10,224); Cincinnati, OH
January 20, 2024; 4:00 p.m., FS1		DePaul	W 74–60	12–7 (3–5)	20 – Brooks	9 – Telfort	6 – Alexander	Hinkle Fieldhouse (8,553); Indianapolis, IN
January 23, 2024; 6:30 p.m., FS1		at Georgetown	W 90–66	13–7 (4–5)	20 – Brooks	11 – Brooks	5 – Davis	Capital One Arena (4,625); Washington, D.C.
January 27, 2024; 3:00 p.m., FS1		Villanova	W 88–81 ^{2OT}	14–7 (5–5)	28 – Davis	11 – Telfort	4 – Alexander	Hinkle Fieldhouse (9,237); Indianapolis, IN
February 2, 2024; 9:00 p.m., FS1		at No. 13 Creighton	W 99–98	15–7 (6–5)	26 – Telfort	5 – Brooks	5 – Davis	CHI Health Center Omaha (17,874); Omaha, NE
February 6, 2024; 8:30 p.m., FS1		at No. 1 UConn	L 62–71	15–8 (6–6)	21 – Davis	9 – Screen	5 – Alexander	XL Center (15,684); Hartford, CT
February 10, 2024; 2:00 p.m., FS1		Providence	W 75–72	16–8 (7–6)	20 – Davis	8 – Tied	8 – Tied	Hinkle Fieldhouse (8,934); Indianapolis, IN
February 13, 2024; 6:30 p.m., FS1		No. 4 Marquette	L 72–78	16–9 (7–7)	19 – Bizjack	7 – Tied	6 – Telfort	Hinkle Fieldhouse (8,344); Indianapolis, IN
February 17, 2024; 12:30 p.m., FOX		No. 17 Creighton	L 57–79	16–10 (7–8)	18 – Thomas	5 – Thomas	4 – Alexander	Hinkle Fieldhouse (9,176); Indianapolis, IN
February 20, 2024; 6:30 p.m., FS1		at Villanova	L 62–72	16–11 (7–9)	19 – Telfort	7 – Telfort	3 – Tied	Finneran Pavilion (6,501); Villanova, PA
February 24, 2024; 8:30 p.m., FS2		at Seton Hall	L 64–76	16–12 (7–10)	12 – Thomas	8 – Telfort	5 – Davis	Prudential Center (10,481); Newark, NJ
February 28, 2024; 8:30 p.m., CBSSN		St. John's	L 59–82	16–13 (7–11)	15 – Alexander	7 – Alexander	3 – Tied	Hinkle Fieldhouse (7,279); Indianapolis, IN
March 2, 2024; 12:00 p.m., FS1		at DePaul	W 82–63	17–13 (8–11)	24 – Davis	7 – Davis	9 – Alexander	Wintrust Arena (4,286); Chicago, IL
March 6, 2024; 7:30 p.m., CBSSN		Xavier	W 72–66	18–13 (9–11)	18 – Telfort	10 – Thomas	4 – Tied	Hinkle Fieldhouse (8,976); Indianapolis, IN
Big East tournament
March 13, 2024; 4:00 p.m., FS1	(8)	vs. (9) Xavier; First Round	L 72–76	18–14	21 – Brooks	7 – Thomas	5 – Alexander	Madison Square Garden (19,812); New York, NY
National Invitation Tournament
March 19, 2024; 9:00 p.m., ESPNU	(4)	Minnesota; First Round - Indiana State Bracket	L 72–73	18–15	25 – Telfort	6 – Tied	7 – Davis	Hinkle Fieldhouse (3,478); Indianapolis, IN
*Non-conference game. ^{#}Rankings from AP Poll. (#) Tournament seedings in parentheses. All times are in Eastern Time.

== Rankings ==
Ranking movements
	Week																			
Poll	Pre	1	2	3	4	5	6	7	8	9	10	11	12	13	14	15	16	17	18	Final
AP																				
Coaches																				

*AP does not release post-NCAA tournament rankings.
