= 2023–24 DePaul Blue Demons men's basketball team =

American college basketball season

2023–24 DePaul Blue Demons men's basketball
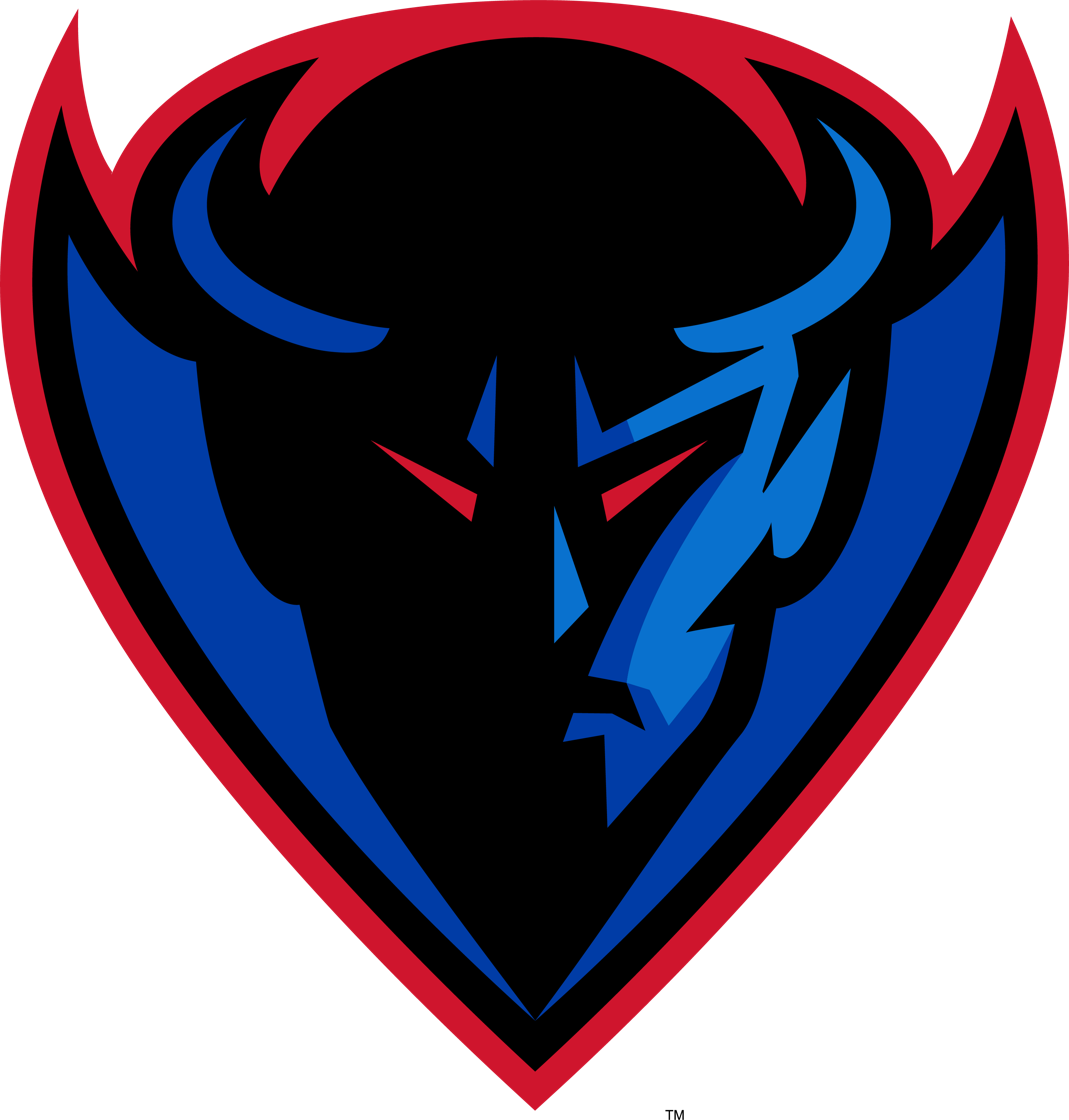
- Conference: Big East Conference
- Record: 3–29 (.094) (0–20 (.000) Big East)
- Head coach: Tony Stubblefield (3rd season; first 18 games, fired Jan. 22); Matt Brady (interim, rest of season)
- Assistant coaches: Paris Parham (3rd season); Steve Thomas (3rd season); Tony Harvey (1st season)
- Home arena: Wintrust Arena

2023–24 Big East men's basketball standings
	Conf.				Overall
Team	W		L	PCT	W		L	PCT
No. 1 UConn †	18	–	2	.900	37	–	3	.925
No. 13 Creighton	14	–	6	.700	25	–	10	.714
No. 12 Marquette	14	–	6	.700	27	–	10	.730
Seton Hall	13	–	7	.650	25	–	12	.676
St. John's	11	–	9	.550	20	–	13	.606
Villanova	10	–	10	.500	18	–	16	.529
Providence	10	–	10	.500	21	–	14	.600
Butler	9	–	11	.450	18	–	15	.545
Xavier	9	–	11	.450	16	–	18	.471
Georgetown	2	–	18	.100	9	–	23	.281
DePaul	0	–	20	.000	3	–	29	.094
† 2024 Big East tournament winner Rankings from AP Poll

The 2023–24 DePaul Blue Demons men's basketball team represented DePaul University during the 2023–24 NCAA Division I men's basketball season. They were led by third-year head coach Tony Stubblefield for the first 18 games of the season. They played their home games at Wintrust Arena in Chicago, Illinois, as members of the Big East Conference. They finished the season 3–29, 0–20 in Big East play to finish in last place and with the worst record in program history. They lost to Villanova in the first round of the Big East tournament.

On January 22, 2024, the school fired head coach Tony Stubblefield after starting the season 3–15. Special assistant to the head coach Matt Brady was named the interim head coach for the remainder of the season. On March 14, the school named former Butler and Ohio State head coach Chris Holtmann the team's new head coach.

== Previous season ==
The Blue Demons finished the 2022–23 season 10–23, 3–17 in Big East play to finish in 10th place. They defeated Seton Hall in the first round of the Big East tournament before losing to Xavier in the quarterfinals.

On January 10, 2023, DePaul defeated Villanova for the first time since 2008, snapping a 22-game losing streak to the Wildcats.

== Offseason ==
=== Departures ===
DePaul departures
Name	Number	Pos.	Height	Weight	Year	Hometown	Reason for departure
Javan Johnson	1	F	6'6	198	RS senior	Decatur, AL	Graduated
Umoja Gibson	2	G	6'1"	173	GS senior	Waco, TX	Graduated
Philmon Gebrewhit	5	G	6'7"	185	RS senior	Boston, MA	Graduate transferred to Northern Illinois
Yor Anei	10	F	6'10"	228	Senior	Overland Park, KS	Graduated
Eral Penn	11	F	6'6"	201	GS senior	Brooklyn, NY	Graduated
Ahamad Bynum	12	G	6'2"	178	RS freshman	Chicago, IL	Transferred to Trinity Valley CC
Nick Ongenda	14	C	6'11"	230	Senior	Mississauga, ON	Graduated/undrafted in 2023 NBA draft; signed with the Utah Jazz
Brendan Farve	20	G	6'5"	192	Senior	Vevey, Switzerland	Walk-on; graduated
Max Williams	30	G	6'2"	192	Junior	Chicago, IL	Walk-on; transferred to Illinois

=== Incoming transfers ===
DePaul transfers
Name	Number	Pos.	Height	Weight	Year	Hometown	Previous school
Chico Carter Jr.	2	G	6'3"	192	GS senior	Columbia, SC	South Carolina
Jaden Henley	10	G/F	6'7"	200	Sophomore	Ontario, CA	Minnesota
Keyondre Young	11	G	6'8"		Junior	Del City, OK	Triton College
Mac Etienne	12	F	6'10"	230	RS sophomore	New York, NY	UCLA
Elijah Fisher	22	G	6'6"	190	Sophomore	Oshawa, ON	Texas Tech
Jeremiah Oden	25	F	6'8"	201	Senior	Chicago, IL	Wyoming

=== 2023 recruiting class ===
College recruiting
Name	Hometown	School	Height	Weight	Commit date
Dramane Camara; SG	South Africa	NBA Academy Africa	6 ft 5 in (1.96 m)	205 lb (93 kg)	May 15, 2023
Dramane Camara; SG	Recruit ratings: Rivals: 247Sports: ESPN: (NR)				
Churchill Abass; C	South Africa	NBA Academy Africa	6 ft 9 in (2.06 m)	245 lb (111 kg)	May 7, 2023
Churchill Abass; C	Recruit ratings: Rivals: 247Sports: ESPN: (NR)				
Overall recruit ranking:
Note: In many cases, Scout, Rivals, 247Sports, On3, and ESPN may conflict in their listings of height and weight.; In these cases, the average was taken. ESPN grades are on a 100-point scale.; Sources: "2023 DePaul Signees". Rivals.; "2023 DePaul Signees". ESPN.; "2023 Team Ranking". Rivals.

== Roster ==
2023–24 DePaul Blue Demons men's basketball team
Players
Coaches

Pos.	#	Name	Height	Weight	Year	Previous school	Hometown
G	0	Zion Cruz	6 ft 4 in (1.93 m)	183 lb (83 kg)	So	Donda Academy	Jersey City, NJ
G	2	Chico Carter Jr.	6 ft 3 in (1.91 m)	192 lb (87 kg)	GS	Cardinal Newman HS; South Carolina	Columbia, SC
G	3	Jalen Terry	6 ft 0 in (1.83 m)	158 lb (72 kg)	Sr	Beecher; Oregon	Flint, MI
G/F	4	K. T. Raimey	6 ft 3 in (1.91 m)	166 lb (75 kg)	Sr	Olathe North; College of Southern Idaho	Olathe, KS
C	5	Churchill Abass	6 ft 9 in (2.06 m)	240 lb (109 kg)	Fr	NBA Academy Africa	Edo State, Nigeria
G/F	10	Jaden Henley	6 ft 7 in (2.01 m)	200 lb (91 kg)	So	Colony; Minnesota	Ontario, CA
G	11	Keyondre Young	6 ft 8 in (2.03 m)	180 lb (82 kg)	Jr	Dek City; Triton College	Del City, OK
F	12	Mac Etienne	6 ft 10 in (2.08 m)	235 lb (107 kg)	RS So	Suffield Academy; UCLA	New York, NY
F	21	Da'Sean Nelson	6 ft 8 in (2.03 m)	205 lb (93 kg)	Sr	Robert S. Rogers; Kilgore College	Toledo, OH
G	22	Elijah Fisher	6 ft 6 in (1.98 m)	190 lb (86 kg)	So	Crestwood Prep; Texas Tech	Oshawa, ON
G	23	Caleb Murphy	6 ft 4 in (1.93 m)	185 lb (84 kg)	Sr	Grayson; South Florida	Youngstown, OH
F	25	Jeremiah Oden	6 ft 8 in (2.03 m)	201 lb (91 kg)	Sr	Sunrise Christian Academy; Wyoming	Chicago, IL
G	35	Dramane Camara	6 ft 5 in (1.96 m)	205 lb (93 kg)	Fr	NBA Academy Africa	Paris, France
G	55	Mo Sall (W)	6 ft 5 in (1.96 m)	180 lb (82 kg)	So	Downers Grove North	Downers Grove, IL

Head coach

- Matt Brady (Siena)

Assistant coach(es)

- Paris Parham (Minnesota State)
- Steve Thomas (Rowan)
- Tony Harvey (Cameron)

Legend

- (C) Team captain
- (S) Suspended
- (I) Ineligible
- (W) Walk-on
- Injured
- Current redshirt

Roster

== Schedule and results ==
Date time, TV	Rank^{#}	Opponent^{#}	Result	Record	High points	High rebounds	High assists	Site (attendance) city, state
Regular season
November 7, 2023*; 8:00 p.m., FS2		Purdue Fort Wayne	L 74–82	0–1	18 – Carter Jr.	8 – Tied	4 – Nelson	Wintrust Arena (931); Chicago, IL
November 11, 2023*; 9:00 p.m., FS2		Long Beach State	L 73–77	0–2	25 – Fisher	7 – Murphy	6 – Carter Jr.	Wintrust Arena (2,651); Chicago, IL
November 14, 2023*; 8:00 p.m., FS2		South Dakota; Arizona Tip-Off campus site game	W 72–60	1–2	16 – Oden	7 – Abass	6 – Henley	Wintrust Arena (2,434); Chicago, IL
November 17, 2023*; 11:00 p.m., CBSSN		vs. South Carolina; Arizona Tip-Off semifinals	L 68–73	1–3	24 – Carter Jr.	6 – Carter Jr.	2 – Tied	Desert Diamond Arena (3,214); Glendale, AZ
November 19, 2023*; 3:30 p.m., CBSSN		vs. San Francisco; Arizona Tip-Off consolation	L 54–70	1–4	15 – Tied	5 – Fisher	4 – Murphy	Desert Diamond Arena (2,589); Glendale, AZ
November 25, 2023*; 8:00 p.m., FS2		Northern Illinois	L 79–89	1–5	23 – Nelson	7 – Fisher	10 – Carter Jr.	Wintrust Arena (2,745); Chicago, IL
December 1, 2023*; 7:30 p.m., FS1		Iowa State; Big East–Big 12 Battle	L 80–99	1–6	25 – Oden	6 – Fisher	8 – Carter Jr.	Wintrust Arena (4,852); Chicago, IL
December 6, 2023*; 8:00 p.m., SECN		at No. 21 Texas A&M	L 64–89	1–7	21 – Carter Jr.	6 – Nelson	4 – Carter Jr.	Reed Arena (8,310); College Station, TX
December 9, 2023*; 1:00 p.m., FS1		Louisville	W 75–68	2–7	22 – Oden	6 – Henley	8 – Carter Jr.	Wintrust Arena (4,255); Chicago, IL
December 16, 2023*; 4:30 p.m., FS1		No. 25 Northwestern	L 46–56	2–8	12 – Oden	7 – Tied	5 – Nelson	Wintrust Arena (4,957); Chicago, IL
December 23, 2023; 3:00 p.m., FS1		Villanova	L 48–84	2–9 (0–1)	11 – Tied	6 – Nelson	4 – Carter Jr.	Wintrust Arena (4,523); Chicago, IL
December 30, 2023*; 3:00 p.m., FS1		Chicago State	W 70–58	3–9	16 – Fisher	7 – Tied	5 – Oden	Wintrust Arena (3,806); Chicago, IL
January 2, 2024; 5:30 p.m., FS1		at No. 4 UConn	L 56–85	3–10 (0–2)	19 – Nelson	5 – Fisher	3 – Terry	Harry A. Gampel Pavilion (10,299); Storrs, CT
January 6, 2024; 11:00 a.m., FS1		at Georgetown	L 65–68	3–11 (0–3)	19 – Nelson	7 – Nelson	5 – Henley	Capital One Arena (5,577); Washington, D.C.
January 9, 2024; 8:00 p.m., CBSSN		No. 22 Creighton	L 58–84	3–12 (0–4)	12 – Tied	9 – Oden	4 – Tied	Wintrust Arena (3,061); Chicago, IL
January 12, 2024; 7:30 p.m., FS1		at Villanova	L 69–94	3–13 (0–5)	20 – Nelson	6 – Nelson	6 – Terry	Finneran Pavilion (6,501); Villanova, PA
January 17, 2024; 8:00 p.m., FS1		Providence	L 62–100	3–14 (0–6)	19 – Fisher	5 – Tied	4 – Terry	Wintrust Arena (2,889); Chicago, IL
January 20, 2024; 3:00 p.m., FS1		at Butler	L 60–74	3–15 (0–7)	20 – Brooks	9 – Telfort	6 – Alexander	Hinkle Fieldhouse (8,553); Indianapolis, IN
January 24, 2024; 8:00 p.m., CBSSN		No. 14 Marquette	L 73–86	3–16 (0–8)	22 – Terry	6 – Terry	5 – Nelson	Wintrust Arena (6,050); Chicago, IL
January 27, 2024; 6:00 p.m., FS1		at No. 17 Creighton	L 62–85	3–17 (0–9)	12 – Fisher	6 – Etienne	2 – Tied	CHI Health Center Omaha (18,571); Omaha, NE
January 30, 2024; 8:00 p.m., FS1		Seton Hall	L 39–72	3–18 (0–10)	11 – Nelson	5 – Young	2 – Tied	Wintrust Arena (2,990); Chicago, IL
February 3, 2024; 8:30 p.m., FS1		Xavier	L 68–93	3–19 (0–11)	17 – Henley	9 – Abass	3 – Raimey	Wintrust Arena (3,649); Chicago, IL
February 6, 2024; 5:30 p.m., FS1		at St. John's	L 57–85	3–20 (0–12)	11 – Raimey	5 – Abass	5 – Fisher	UBS Arena (6,035); Elmont, NY
February 14, 2024; 8:00 p.m., CBSSN		No. 1 UConn	L 65–101	3–21 (0–13)	15 – Henley	5 – Tied	10 – Terry	Wintrust Arena (3,465); Chicago, IL
February 17, 2024; 7:30 p.m., FS1		at Providence	L 70–81	3–22 (0–14)	15 – Tied	8 – Terry	3 – Etienne	Amica Mutual Pavilion (12,400); Providence, RI
February 21, 2024; 8:00 p.m., FS1		at No. 7 Marquette	L 71–105	3–23 (0–15)	19 – Tied	9 – Abass	2 – Carter Jr.	Fiserv Forum (14,100); Milwaukee, WI
February 24, 2024; 5:00 p.m., CBSSN		Georgetown	L 76–77	3–24 (0–16)	16 – Tied	6 – Henley	5 – Carter Jr.	Wintrust Arena (4,279); Chicago, IL
February 28, 2024; 6:00 p.m., FS2		at Xavier	L 58–91	3–25 (0–17)	14 – Fisher	6 – Tied	6 – Terry	Cintas Center (10,136); Cincinnati, OH
March 2, 2024; 11:00 a.m., FS1		Butler	L 63–82	3–26 (0–18)	15 – Henley	7 – Abass	7 – Carter Jr.	Wintrust Arena (4,286); Chicago, IL
March 5, 2024; 8:00 p.m., FS1		St. John's	L 77–104	3–27 (0–19)	23 – Carter Jr.	5 – Carter Jr.	6 – Carter Jr.	Wintrust Arena (2,824); Chicago, IL
March 9, 2024; 7:30 p.m., FS1		at Seton Hall	L 62–86	3–28 (0–20)	16 – Carter Jr.	4 – Henley	3 – Nelson	Prudential Center (9,419); Newark, NJ
Big East tournament
March 13, 2024; 8:00 p.m., FS1	(11)	vs. (6) Villanova; First round	L 57–58	3–29	18 – Terry	15 – Terry	5 – Terry	Madison Square Garden (19,812); New York, NY
*Non-conference game. ^{#}Rankings from AP Poll. (#) Tournament seedings in parentheses. All times are in Central Time.

== Point shaving scandal ==
On January 15, 2026, the Federal Bureau of Investigation (FBI) unsealed an indictment accusing three DePaul players of point shaving and match fixing. The players charged in the indictment include Jalen Terry and Da'Sean Nelson, who each last played in the 2023–24 season; a third player, Micawber Etienne, is mentioned in the indictment as being charged elsewhere.
