= Elijah Fisher =

Canadian basketball player

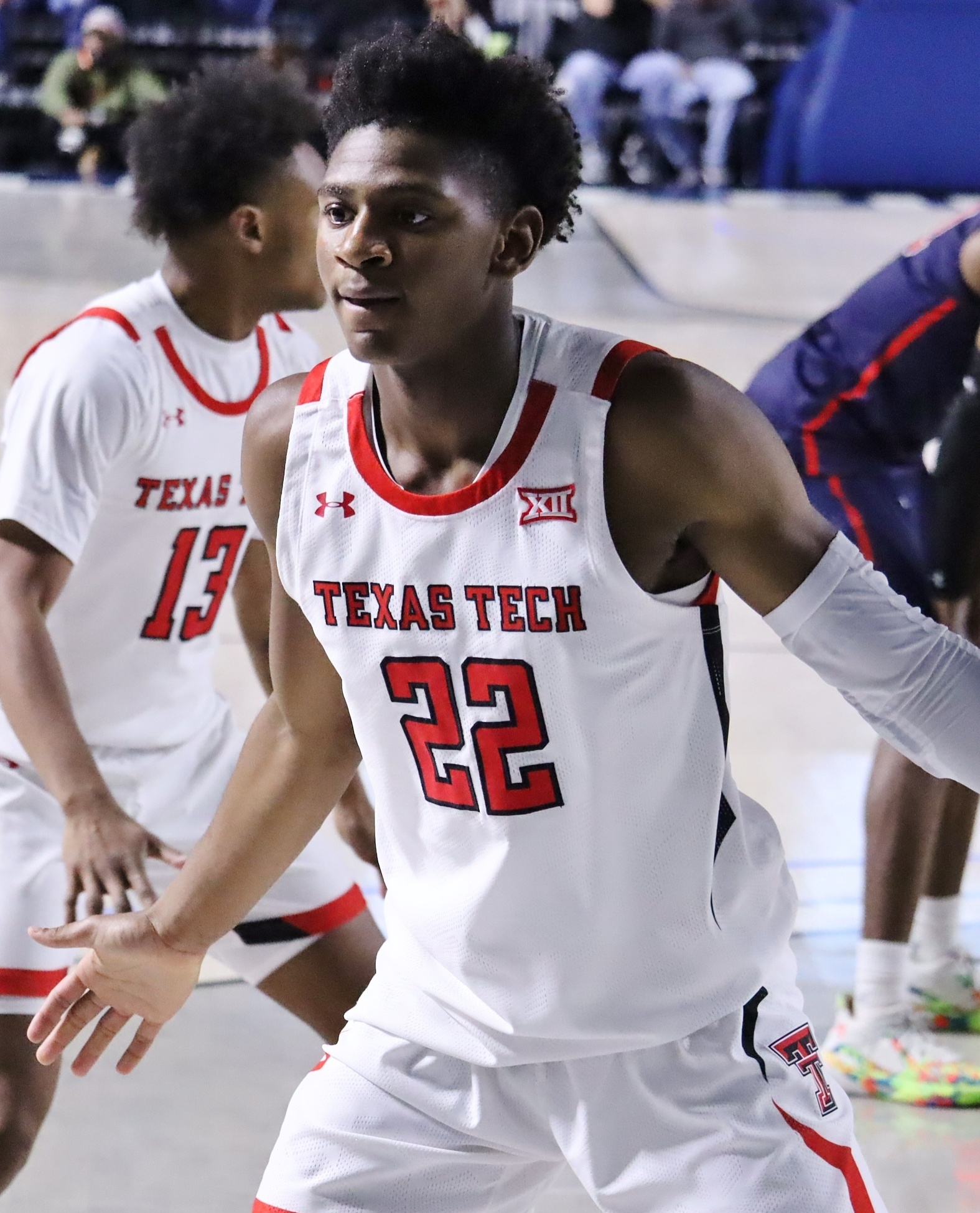
- Fisher with Texas Tech in 2022

No. 21 – Seton Hall Pirates
- Position: Shooting guard / small forward
- League: Big East Conference

Personal information
- Born: January 3, 2004 (age 22) Oshawa, Ontario, Canada
- Listed height: 6 ft 6 in (1.98 m)
- Listed weight: 220 lb (100 kg)

Career information
- High school: Crestwood Prep (Toronto, Ontario)
- College: Texas Tech (2022–2023); DePaul (2023–2024); Pacific (2024–2025); Seton Hall (2025–present)

Career highlights
- BioSteel All-Canadian Game MVP (2022)
Medals
Men's basketball
Representing Canada
FIBA Under-19 World Cup
Bronze medal – third place	2021 Latvia	Team
FIBA Americas Under-18 Championship
Bronze medal – third place	2022 Mexico	Team

Elijah Fisher (born January 3, 2004) is a Canadian college basketball player for the Seton Hall Pirates of the Big East Conference. He previously played for the Pacific Tigers, the DePaul Blue Demons, and the Texas Tech Red Raiders.

== Early life ==
Fisher was born in Oshawa, Ontario, the second of five children of Thelia and Rohan Fisher. At age 12, as a seventh-grader, he competed for the under-18 high school team at Crestwood Preparatory College in Toronto. Fisher became the first middle school student to play for Crestwood Prep's varsity team. By the age of 13, he stood 6 ft 5 in (1.96 m). He was considered by many analysts to be the number one player in his class as he entered high school.

Fisher was a consensus five-star recruit and one of the top players in the 2023 class; before reclassifying to the class of 2022.

College recruiting
Name	Hometown	School	Height	Weight	Commit date
Elijah Fisher; SG / SF	Oshawa, ON	Crestwood Prep (ON)	6 ft 7 in (2.01 m)	210 lb (95 kg)	May 26, 2022
Elijah Fisher; SG / SF	Recruit ratings: Rivals: 247Sports: ESPN: (93)				
Overall recruit ranking: Rivals: 34 247Sports: 58 ESPN: —
Note: In many cases, Scout, Rivals, 247Sports, On3, and ESPN may conflict in their listings of height and weight.; In these cases, the average was taken. ESPN grades are on a 100-point scale.; Sources: "Texas Tech 2022 Basketball Commitments". Rivals.; "2022 Texas Tech Red Raiders Recruiting Class". ESPN.; "2022 Team Ranking". Rivals.

== College career ==
Fisher played as a freshman for the Texas Tech Red Raiders in 2022–23. In May 2023, he announced his transfer to the DePaul Blue Demons.

== Career statistics ==
Legend
GP	Games played	GS	Games started	MPG	Minutes per game
FG%	Field goal percentage	3P%	3-point field goal percentage	FT%	Free throw percentage
RPG	Rebounds per game	APG	Assists per game	SPG	Steals per game
BPG	Blocks per game	PPG	Points per game	**Bold**	Career high

=== College ===
Year	Team	GP	GS	MPG	FG%	3P%	FT%	RPG	APG	SPG	BPG	PPG
2022–23	Texas Tech	28	1	12.2	.461	.250	.586	2.0	.4	.4	.1	3.3
2023–24	DePaul	32	30	31.8	**.520**	.263	.722	3.8	1.4	**.8**	.3	10.2
2024–25	Pacific	**33**	**33**	**33.7**	.483	**.297**	**.748**	**4.8**	**1.5**	.7	.3	**15.7**
2025–26	Seton Hall	**33**	**33**	20.7	.455	.237	.696	2.9	.8	.7	**.5**	6.6
Career		126	97	25.0	.485	.269	.721	3.4	1.0	.7	.3	9.2

== National team career ==
Fisher represented Canada at the 2021 FIBA Under-19 Basketball World Cup in Latvia. In his national team debut on July 3, he scored 11 points in an 80–71 win over Lithuania. Fisher averaged 6.9 points and 3.4 rebounds per game, helping Canada win the bronze medal.
