= 2023–24 Georgetown Hoyas men's basketball team =

American college basketball season

2023–24 Georgetown Hoyas men's basketball
- Conference: Big East Conference
- Record: 9–23 (2–18 Big East)
- Head coach: Ed Cooley (1st season)
- Associate head coach: Jeff Battle (1st season)
- Assistant coaches: Brian Blaney (1st season); Walt Corbean (1st season); LaDontae Henton (1st season); Ivan Thomas (1st season)
- Home arena: Capital One Arena

2023–24 Big East men's basketball standings
	Conf.				Overall
Team	W		L	PCT	W		L	PCT
No. 1 UConn †	18	–	2	.900	37	–	3	.925
No. 13 Creighton	14	–	6	.700	25	–	10	.714
No. 12 Marquette	14	–	6	.700	27	–	10	.730
Seton Hall	13	–	7	.650	25	–	12	.676
St. John's	11	–	9	.550	20	–	13	.606
Villanova	10	–	10	.500	18	–	16	.529
Providence	10	–	10	.500	21	–	14	.600
Butler	9	–	11	.450	18	–	15	.545
Xavier	9	–	11	.450	16	–	18	.471
Georgetown	2	–	18	.100	9	–	23	.281
DePaul	0	–	20	.000	3	–	29	.094
† 2024 Big East tournament winner Rankings from AP Poll

The 2023–24 Georgetown Hoyas men's basketball team represented Georgetown University in the 2023–24 NCAA Division I men's basketball season. The Hoyas, led by first-year head coach Ed Cooley, were members of the Big East Conference. The Hoyas played their home games at Capital One Arena in Washington, D.C.

Despite the introduction of a new coaching staff and major roster turnover, the Hoyas' historic period of struggle continued during this season, which marked the team's third consecutive year with more than twenty losses.

== Previous season ==
The Hoyas had their second historically bad season in a row, finishing the season 7–25 overall, 2–18 in Big East play to finish in last place in the 11-team conference for the second consecutive year. In the Big East tournament, they lost to Villanova in the first round, bringing their season to an end. On March 9, 2023, the school fired head coach Patrick Ewing after six seasons at the helm.

== Offseason ==
=== Departures ===
Departures
Name	No.	Pos.	Height	Weight	Year	Hometown	Reason for Departure
Brandon Murray	0	F	6'5"	214	Sophomore	Baltimore, MD	Transferred to Ole Miss
Primo Spears	1	G	6'3"	185	Sophomore	Hartford, CT	Transferred to Florida State
Dante Harris	2	G	6'0"	170	Junior	Washington, DC	Transferred to Virginia
Denver Anglin	4	G	6'2"	165	Freshman	Montclair, NJ	Transferred to SMU
Akok Akok	11	F	6'9"	205	Senior	Manchester, NH	Transferred to West Virginia
Jordan Riley	12	G	6'4"	195	Sophomore	Brentwood, NY	Transferred to Temple
Bryson Mozone	15	G/F	6'6"	200	Grad student	North Augusta, SC	Completed eligibility
Bradley Ezewiro	22	F	6'8"	246	Sophomore	Torrance, CA	Transferred to Saint Louis
D'Ante Bass	23	F	6'7"	185	Freshman	Savannah, GA	Transferred to Alabama State
Malcolm Wilson	32	C	7'0"	220	Senior	Columbia, SC	Transferred to Queens University of Charlotte
Qudus Wahab	34	C	6'11"	240	Senior	Lagos, Nigeria	Transferred to Penn State

=== Incoming transfers ===
Incoming transfers
Name	No.	Pos.	Height	Weight	Year	Hometown	Previous School
Dontrez Styles	0	F	6'6"	212	Junior	Kinston, NC	North Carolina
Rowan Brumbaugh	1	G	6'4"	183	Sophomore	Washington, DC	Texas
Austin Montgomery	4	F	6'4"	185	RS Freshman	New Orleans, LA	LSU
Jayden Epps	10	G	6'2"	187	Sophomore	Norfolk, VA	Illinois
Cam Bacote	11	G	6'3"	176	Graduate student	Hampton, VA	Western Carolina
Supreme Cook	24	F	6'9"	220	Senior	East Orange, NJ	Fairfield
Ismael Massoud	25	F	6'8"	220	Graduate student	New York, NY	Kansas State

=== 2023 recruiting class ===
College recruiting information
Name	Hometown	School	Height	Weight	Commit date
Drew Fielder #20 C	Boise, ID	Southern California Academy	6 ft 10 in (2.08 m)	220 lb (100 kg)	Mar 28, 2023
Drew Fielder #20 C	Recruit ratings: Rivals: 247Sports: ESPN: (82)				
Drew McKenna #33 SF	Ellicott City, MD	Glenelg Country School	6 ft 8 in (2.03 m)	200 lb (91 kg)	May 30, 2023
Drew McKenna #33 SF	Recruit ratings: Rivals: 247Sports: ESPN: (80)				
Overall recruit ranking:
Note: In many cases, Scout, Rivals, 247Sports, On3, and ESPN may conflict in their listings of height and weight.; In these cases, the average was taken. ESPN grades are on a 100-point scale.; Sources: "2023 Georgetown Signees". ESPN.; "2023 Team Ranking". Rivals.

== Roster ==
2023–24 Georgetown Hoyas men's basketball team
Players
Coaches

Pos.	#	Name	Height	Weight	Year	Previous school	Hometown
G/F	0	Dontrez Styles	6 ft 6 in (1.98 m)	212 lb (96 kg)	Jr	North Carolina	Kinston, NC
G	1	Rowan Brumbaugh	6 ft 4 in (1.93 m)	183 lb (83 kg)	RS Fr	Texas	Washington, DC
G	2	Hashem Asadallah (W)	6 ft 1 in (1.85 m)	180 lb (82 kg)	Fr	American School of Kuwait	Jabriya, Kuwait
F	4	Austin Montgomery (W)	6 ft 4 in (1.93 m)	185 lb (84 kg)	So	LSU	New Orleans, LA
G	5	Jay Heath	6 ft 3 in (1.91 m)	209 lb (95 kg)	Sr	Arizona State	Washington, DC
G	10	Jayden Epps	6 ft 2 in (1.88 m)	187 lb (85 kg)	So	Illinois	Norfolk, VA
G	11	Cam Bacote	6 ft 3 in (1.91 m)	176 lb (80 kg)	GS	Western Carolina	Hampton, VA
F	15	Drew McKenna (redshirt)	6 ft 8 in (2.03 m)	200 lb (91 kg)	Fr	Glenelg Country School	Laurel, MD
C	20	Drew Fielder	6 ft 10 in (2.08 m)	216 lb (98 kg)	Fr	Southern California Academy	Boise, ID
C	21	Ryan Mutombo	7 ft 2 in (2.18 m)	259 lb (117 kg)	Jr	The Lovett School	Atlanta, GA
G	22	Donovan Grant (W)	6 ft 6 in (1.98 m)	200 lb (91 kg)	Jr	Oregon State	Atlanta, GA
F	24	Supreme Cook	6 ft 9 in (2.06 m)	229 lb (104 kg)	Sr	Fairfield	East Orange, NJ
F	25	Ismael Massoud	6 ft 9 in (2.06 m)	213 lb (97 kg)	GS	Kansas State	East Harlem, NY
G	31	Wayne Bristol Jr.	6 ft 6 in (1.98 m)	195 lb (88 kg)	Sr	Howard	Upper Marlboro, MD
G	34	Jonathan Kazor (W)	6 ft 2 in (1.88 m)	220 lb (100 kg)	GS	Macalester	Potomac, MD
F	55	Victor Muresan (W)	6 ft 11 in (2.11 m)	173 lb (78 kg)	Sr	Georgetown Day School	Potomac, MD

Head coach

- Ed Cooley (Stonehill)

Assistant coach(es)

- Jeff Battle (Marshall)
- Brian Blaney (Roanoke)
- Walt Corbean (Xavier)
- LaDontae Henton (Providence)
- Ivan Thomas (VCU)

Legend

- (C) Team captain
- (S) Suspended
- (I) Ineligible
- (W) Walk-on
- Injured
- Current redshirt

Roster

NOTES: (1) Donovan Grant and Victor Muresan left the team during the final week of the fall semester. (2) Drew McKenna was added to the roster on December 11.

== Season recap ==
=== Non-conference season ===
Georgetown played an 11-game non-conference schedule from November 7 through December 16, with nine of the games at Capital One Arena. The Hoyas visited former Big East rival Rutgers in the annual Gavitt Tipoff Games. They also hosted an unnamed, unsponsored two-day multi-team event, referred to simply as the "Georgetown MTE," in which the Hoyas, American, and Mount St. Mary's each played a game against the other two teams. Georgetown hosted TCU in the annual Big East–Big 12 Battle and former Big East member Syracuse in the yearly renewal of their rivalry. Georgetown closed out its non-conference schedule with a visit to its former Big East rival Notre Dame in the first season of a two-year home-and-home series.

=== Conference season ===
Georgetown played a 20-game conference season from December 19 through March 9, meeting each Big East opponent in a home-and-home series. Georgetown finished in 10th place, with a record of 2–18.

=== Big East tournament ===
Georgetown lost in the first round of the 2024 Big East tournament, finishing the season with an overall record of 9–23.

== Schedule and results ==
Date time, TV	Rank^{#}	Opponent^{#}	Result	Record	High points	High rebounds	High assists	Site (attendance) city, state
Preseason
October 14, 2023*		Wake Forest; Scrimmage	W 81–77		46 – Epps	–	–	McDonough Gymnasium; Washington, DC
October 21, 2023*		vs. Pittsburgh; Scrimmage	L 64–78		–	–	–	Allegany College of Maryland; Cumberland, MD
October 27, 2023*; 7:00 p.m.		Blue vs. Gray; Intrasquad						McDonough Gymnasium; Washington, DC
Non-conference regular season
November 7, 2023*; 7:00 p.m., FS2		Le Moyne	W 94–57	1–0	19 – Cook	13 – Cook	11 – Epps	Capital One Arena (9,335); Washington, DC
November 11, 2023*; 8:00 p.m., FS2		Holy Cross	L 67–68	1–1	22 – Epps	10 – Cook	3 – Tied	Capital One Arena (7,621); Washington, DC
November 15, 2023*; 8:30 p.m., FS1		at Rutgers; Gavitt Tipoff Games	L 60–71	1–2	16 – Epps	7 – Styles	2 – Brumbaugh	Jersey Mike's Arena (8,000); Piscataway, NJ
November 18, 2023*; 12:00 p.m., WDCA		Mount St. Mary's; Georgetown MTE	W 83–72	2–2	26 – Styles	8 – Tied	6 – Epps	Capital One Arena (4,648); Washington, DC
November 19, 2023*; 4:30 p.m., FS2		American; Georgetown MTE	W 88–83 ^{OT}	3–2	31 – Epps	11 – Styles	4 – Tied	Capital One Arena (4,755); Washington, DC
November 25, 2023*; 12:00 p.m., FS2		Jackson State	W 88–81	4–2	34 – Epps	7 – Cook	4 – Epps	Capital One Arena (4,126); Washington, DC
November 29, 2023*; 8:30 p.m., FS1		Merrimack	W 69–67	5–2	14 – Bristol	12 – Cook	4 – Brumbaugh	Capital One Arena (2,744); Washington, DC
December 2, 2023*; 5:37 p.m., FS1		TCU; Big East–Big 12 Battle	L 83–84	5–3	24 – Epps	10 – Massoud	5 – Epps	Capital One Arena (7,910); Washington, DC
December 9, 2023*; 11:30 a.m., FOX		Syracuse; Rivalry	L 68–80	5–4	17 – Epps	10 – Cook	6 – Epps	Capital One Arena (14,193); Washington, DC
December 12, 2023*; 8:30 p.m., FS1		Coppin State	W 71–54	6–4	19 – Styles	11 – Cook	4 – Tied	Capital One Arena (2,924); Washington, DC
December 16, 2023*; 2:15 p.m., The CW		at Notre Dame	W 72–68 ^{OT}	7–4	16 – Fielder	9 – Cook	5 – Heath	Joyce Center (7,140); Notre Dame, IN
Big East regular season
December 19, 2023; 6:30 p.m., FS1		at Butler	L 64–74	7–5 (0–1)	19 – Styles	7 – Cook	3 – Tied	Hinkle Fieldhouse (6,915); Indianapolis, IN
December 22, 2023; 7:00 p.m., FS1		at No. 6 Marquette	L 51–81	7–6 (0–2)	14 – Epps	11 – Cook	3 – Tied	Fiserv Forum (16,930); Milwaukee, WI
January 2, 2024; 7:00 p.m., CBSSN		Creighton	L 60–77	7–7 (0–3)	19 – Brumbaugh	5 – Cook	5 – Brumbaugh	Capital One Arena (4,980); Washington, DC
January 6, 2024; 12:00 p.m., FS1		DePaul	W 68–65	8–7 (1–3)	14 – Cook	13 – Styles	5 – Epps	Capital One Arena (5,577); Washington, DC
January 9, 2024; 6:30 p.m., FS1		Seton Hall	L 70–74	8–8 (1–4)	30 – Epps	5 – Cook	5 – Epps	Capital One Arena (5,577); Washington, DC
January 14, 2024; 12:00 p.m., FOX		at No. 4 UConn; Rivalry	L 67–80	8–9 (1–5)	18 – Cook	13 – Cook	1 – Tied	XL Center (15,684); Hartford, CT
January 19, 2024; 6:30 p.m., FS1		at Xavier	L 91–92	8–10 (1–6)	30 – Epps	10 – Styles	11 – Epps	Cintas Center (10,432); Cincinnati, OH
January 23, 2024; 6:30 p.m., FS1		Butler	L 66–90	8–11 (1–7)	16 – Epps	12 – Cook	3 – Epps	Capital One Arena (4,625); Washington, DC
January 27, 2024; 12:30 p.m., FOX		at Providence	L 76–84	8–12 (1–8)	26 – Epps	7 – Massoud	6 – Epps	Amica Mutual Pavilion (12,580); Providence, RI
February 3, 2024; 2:00 p.m., FS1		No. 9 Marquette	L 57–91	8–13 (1–9)	12 – Brumbaugh	7 – Fielder	3 – Brumbaugh	Capital One Arena (10,563); Washington, DC
February 7, 2024; 6:30 p.m., FS2		at Seton Hall	L 70–76	8–14 (1–10)	20 – Tied	11 – Cook	7 – Epps	Prudential Center (9,422); Newark, NJ
February 10, 2024; 12:00 p.m., FS1		No. 1 UConn; Rivalry	L 64–89	8–15 (1–11)	23 – Styles	8 – Cook	4 – Tied	Capital One Arena (13,040); Washington, DC
February 13, 2024; 8:40 p.m., FS1		at No. 17 Creighton	L 72–94	8–16 (1–12)	19 – Cook	11 – Cook	4 – Bristol	CHI Health Center Omaha (16,768); Omaha, NE
February 16, 2024; 7:05 p.m., CBSSN		Villanova	L 54–70	8–17 (1–13)	14 – Brumbaugh	11 – Cook	5 – Brumbaugh	Capital One Arena (9,406); Washington, DC
February 21, 2024; 7:00 p.m., FS1		St. John's; Rivalry	L 85–90	8–18 (1–14)	31 – Epps	8 – Cook	7 – Tied	Capital One Arena (4,839); Washington, DC
February 24, 2024; 6:00 p.m., CBSSN		at DePaul	W 77–76	9–18 (2–14)	33 – Epps	11 – Cook	5 – Epps	Wintrust Arena (4,279); Chicago, IL
February 27, 2024; 6:30 p.m., FS1		at Villanova	L 47–75	9–19 (2–15)	16 – Styles	7 – Styles	3 – Tied	Finneran Pavilion (6,501); Villanova, PA
March 2, 2024; 7:30 p.m., FS1		Xavier	L 93–98	9–20 (2–16)	24 – Brumbaugh	14 – Cook	7 – Epps	Capital One Arena (7,016); Washington, DC
March 5, 2024; 7:00 p.m., FS1		Providence	L 58–71	9–21 (2–17)	16 – Epps	8 – Styles	2 – Brumbaugh	Capital One Arena (5,287); Washington, DC
March 9, 2024; 12:00 p.m., FOX		at St. John's; Rivalry	L 78–86	9–22 (2–18)	23 – Epps	6 – Cook	3 – Tied	Madison Square Garden (16,127); New York, NY
Big East tournament
March 13, 2024; 6:40 p.m., FS1	(10)	vs. (7) Providence; First round	L 56–74	9–23	30 – Epps	9 – Styles	4 – Epps	Madison Square Garden (N/A); New York, NY
*Non-conference game. ^{#}Rankings from AP Poll. (#) Tournament seedings in parentheses. All times are in Eastern Time.

== Awards and honors ==
=== Big East Conference honors ===
Weekly honors
Honors	Player	Position	Date awarded	Ref.
Big East Men’s Basketball Freshman of the Week	Rowan Brumbaugh	G	December 18, 2023	
