= Xavier Musketeers men's basketball statistical leaders =

The Xavier Musketeers men's basketball statistical leaders are individual statistical leaders of the Xavier Musketeers men's basketball program in various categories, including points, assists, blocks, rebounds, and steals. Within those areas, the lists identify single-game, single-season, and career leaders. The Musketeers represent Xavier University in the NCAA's Big East Conference.

Xavier began competing in intercollegiate basketball in 1919. However, the school's record book does not generally list records from before the 1950s, as records from before this period are often incomplete and inconsistent. Since scoring was much lower in this era, and teams played much fewer games during a typical season, it is likely that few or no players from this era would appear on these lists anyway.

The NCAA did not officially record assists as a stat until the 1983–84 season, and blocks and steals until the 1985–86 season, but Xavier's record books includes players in these stats before these seasons. These lists are updated through the end of the 2021–22 season.

== Scoring ==
Career
Rk	Player	Points	Seasons
1	Byron Larkin	2,696	1984–85 1985–86 1986–87 1987–88
2	Trevon Bluiett	2,261	2014–15 2015–16 2016–17 2017–18
3	David West	2,132	1999–00 2000–01 2001–02 2002–03
4	Romain Sato	2,005	2000–01 2001–02 2002–03 2003–04
5	Tyrone Hill	2,003	1986–87 1987–88 1988–89 1989–90
6	Lenny Brown	1,885	1995–96 1996–97 1997–98 1998–99
7	Tu Holloway	1,833	2008–09 2009–10 2010–11 2011–12
8	Anthony Hicks	1,805	1979–80 1980–81 1981–82 1982–83
9	Jamie Gladden	1,780	1989–90 1990–91 1991–92 1992–93
10	Zach Freemantle	1,749	2019–20 2020–21 2021–22 2022–23 2024–25

Season
Rk	Player	Points	Season
1	Byron Larkin	792	1986–87
2	Steve Thomas	779	1963–64
3	Byron Larkin	758	1987–88
4	Jordan Crawford	718	2009–10
5	Trevon Bluiett	676	2017–18
6	Trevon Bluiett	665	2016–17
7	Byron Larkin	654	1985–86
8	Lenny Brown	653	1998–99
9	Quincy Olivari	651	2023–24
10	Tyrone Hill	646	1989–90

Single game
Rk	Player	Points	Season	Opponent
1	Steve Thomas	50	1963–64	Detroit
2	David West	47	2002–03	Dayton
3	Byron Larkin	45	1985–86	Loyola of Chicago
	Steve Thomas	45	1963–64	Cincinnati
	Gene Smith	45	1951–52	Georgetown, Ky.

== Rebounds ==
Career
Rk	Player	Rebounds	Seasons
1	Tyrone Hill	1,380	1986–87 1987–88 1988–89 1989–90
2	Bob Pelkington	1,325	1961–62 1962–63 1963–64
3	David West	1,308	1999–00 2000–01 2001–02 2002–03
4	Brian Grant	1,080	1990–91 1991–92 1992–93 1993–94
5	Dave Piontek	995	1953–54 1954–55 1955–56
6	Bob Quick	939	1965–66 1966–67 1967–68
7	Joe Viviano	906	1956–57 1957–58 1958–59
8	Romain Sato	892	2000–01 2001–02 2002–03 2003–04
9	Zach Freemantle	888	2019–20 2020–21 2021–22 2022–23 2024–25
10	Tyrique Jones	874	2016–17 2017–18 2018–19 2019–20

Season
Rk	Player	Rebounds	Season
1	Bob Pelkington	567	1963–64
2	Corny Freeman	526	1956–57
3	Bob Pelkington	454	1962–63
4	Tyrone Hill	403	1988–89
5	Tyrone Hill	402	1989–90
6	Dave Piontek	399	1955–56
7	David West	378	2002–03
	Joe Viviano	378	1957–58
9	Bob Quick	365	1967–68
10	Luther Rackley	363	1968–69

Single game
Rk	Player	Rebounds	Season	Opponent
1	Bob Pelkington	31	1963–64	St. Francis (PA)
2	Bob Pelkington	30	1963–64	Canisius
3	Corny Freeman	28	1956–57	Minnesota
	Corny Freeman	28	1956–57	Loyola (MD)
	Corny Freeman	28	1956–57	W. Kentucky

== Assists ==
Career
Rk	Player	Assists	Seasons
1	Ralph Lee	699	1982–83 1983–84 1984–85 1985–86
2	Jamal Walker	639	1987–88 1988–89 1989–90 1990–91
3	Tu Holloway	550	2008–09 2009–10 2010–11 2011–12
4	Quentin Goodin	544	2016–17 2017–18 2018–19 2019–20
5	Paul Scruggs	510	2017–18 2018–19 2019–20 2020–21 2021–22
6	Keith Walker	496	1976–77 1977–78 1978–79 1979–80
7	Dee Davis	492	2011–12 2012–13 2013–14 2014–15
8	Dedrick Finn	481	2002–03 2003–04 2004–05 2005–06
9	Gary Lumpkin	470	1995–96 1996–97 1997–98 1998–99
10	Anthony Hicks	466	1979–80 1980–81 1981–82 1982–83

Season
Rk	Player	Assists	Season
1	Ralph Lee	251	1985–86
2	Dee Davis	221	2014–15
3	Ralph Lee	199	1984–85
4	Jamal Walker	196	1989–90
5	Jamal Walker	193	1988–89
6	Steve Gentry	176	1993–94
7	Tu Holloway	174	2010–11
8	Quentin Goodin	171	2017–18
9	Tu Holloway	166	2011–12
10	Drew Lavender	164	2006–07

Single game
Rk	Player	Assists	Season	Opponent
1	Keith Walker	18	1979–80	Detroit
2	Dee Davis	15	2014–15	Providence College
	Dee Davis	15	2012–13	Fairleigh Dickinson
	Tu Holloway	15	2010–11	La Salle
	Ralph Lee	15	1985–86	Loyola of Chicago
	Dave Lynch	15	1965–66	St. Francis, Pa.

== Steals ==
Career
Rk	Player	Steals	Seasons
1	Lenny Brown	242	1995–96 1996–97 1997–98 1998–99
2	Anthony Hicks	226	1979–80 1980–81 1981–82 1982–83
3	James Posey	214	1996–97 1997–98 1998–99
4	Nick Daniels	202	1975–76 1976–77 1977–78 1978–79
5	Byron Larkin	201	1984–85 1985–86 1986–87 1987–88
6	Ralph Lee	194	1982–83 1983–84 1984–85 1985–86
7	Paul Scruggs	178	2017–18 2018–19 2019–20 2020–21 2021–22
	Stan Kimbrough	178	1986–87 1987–88 1988–89
9	Jamal Walker	174	1987–88 1988–89 1989–90 1990–91
10	David West	171	1999–00 2000–01 2001–02 2002–03

Season
Rk	Player	Steals	Season
1	James Posey	102	1998–99
2	Lenny Brown	81	1997–98
3	Nick Daniels	79	1977–78
4	Stan Kimbrough	69	1988–89
5	Byron Larkin	63	1987–88
	James Posey	63	1997–98
7	Lenny Brown	62	1996–97
	Lenny Brown	62	1998–99
9	Anthony Hicks	60	1981–82
10	Anthony Hicks	58	1980–81
	Walt McBride	58	1985–86
	Stan Kimbrough	58	1987–88
	Lloyd Price	58	1999–00

Single game
Rk	Player	Steals	Season	Opponent
1	James Posey	9	1997–98	Fordham
2	Jamal Walker	8	1990–91	Fordham
	Stan Kimbrough	8	1988–89	Louisville
	Anthony Hicks	8	1981–82	Butler
	Keith Walker	8	1978–79	Valparaiso

== Blocks ==
Career
Rk	Player	Blocks	Seasons
1	David West	228	1999–00 2000–01 2001–02 2002–03
2	Aaron Williams	197	1989–90 1990–91 1991–92 1992–93
3	Justin Doellman	140	2003–04 2004–05 2005–06 2006–07
4	Kenny Frease	130	2008–09 2009–10 2010–11 2011–12
5	Jason Love	127	2006–07 2007–08 2008–09 2009–10
	Brian Grant	127	1990–91 1991–92 1992–93 1993–94
7	Dexter Bailey	120	1980–81 1981–82 1982–83 1983–84
8	Zach Freemantle	99	2019–20 2020–21 2021–22 2022–23 2024–25
9	Tyrique Jones	98	2016–17 2017–18 2018–19 2019–20
10	Jack Nunge	93	2021–22 2022–23

Season
Rk	Player	Blocks	Season
1	David West	80	2001–02
2	David West	61	2000–01
3	Aaron Williams	57	1991–92
	Aaron Williams	57	1990–91
5	Aaron Williams	55	1992–93
6	Zach Hankins	54	2018–19
7	David West	51	2002–03
	Justin Doellman	51	2005–06
9	Jack Nunge	50	2021–22
	Jason Love	50	2009–10

Single game
Rk	Player	Blocks	Season	Opponent
1	David West	8	2001–02	Coastal Carolina
2	David West	7	2001–02	Rhode Island
	David West	7	2000–01	La Salle
	Dave Payton	7	1977–78	Southwestern of Memphis
	Aaron Williams	7	1989–90	Loyola of Chicago
6	Zach Hankins	6	2018–19	Detroit Mercy
	Travis Taylor	6	2012–13	Saint Louis
	David West	6	2000–01	George Washington
	Reggie Butler	6	2000–01	Eastern Kentucky
	Aaron Williams	6	1990–91	Mt. St. Mary's
	Brian Grant	6	1993–94	George Washington
	James Posey	6	1998–99	Temple
