= 1986–87 Xavier Musketeers men's basketball team =

American college basketball season

1986–87 Xavier Musketeers men's basketball

MCC tournament champions

NCAA tournament, Second Round
- Conference: Midwestern Collegiate Conference
- Record: 19–13 (7–5 MCC)
- Head coach: Pete Gillen (2nd season)
- Home arena: Cincinnati Gardens

1986–87 Midwestern Collegiate Conference men's basketball standings
	Conf.				Overall
Team	W		L	PCT	W		L	PCT
Evansville	8	–	4	.667	16	–	12	.571
Loyola (IL)	8	–	4	.667	16	–	13	.552
Xavier †	7	–	5	.583	19	–	13	.594
Saint Louis	7	–	5	.583	25	–	10	.714
Oral Roberts	5	–	7	.417	10	–	18	.357
Butler	2	–	10	.167	9	–	19	.321
Detroit Mercy	2	–	10	.167	7	–	21	.250
† 1987 MCC tournament winner

The 1986–87 Xavier Musketeers men's basketball team represented Xavier University from Cincinnati, Ohio in the 1986–87 season. Led by head coach Pete Gillen, the Musketeers finished with a 21–12 record (7–5 MCC), and won the MCC tournament to receive an automatic bid to the NCAA tournament. In the NCAA tournament, the Musketeers knocked off No. 4 seed Missouri in the opening round, then lost to No. 5 seed Duke in the round of 32.

== Roster ==
1986–87 Xavier Musketeers men's basketball team
Players
Coaches

Pos.	#	Name	Height	Weight	Year	Hometown
PG	11	Stan Kimbrough	5 ft 11 in (1.8 m)	150 lb (68 kg)	So	Cleveland, Ohio
SG	23	Byron Larkin	6 ft 3 in (1.91 m)	185 lb (84 kg)	Jr	Cincinnati, Ohio
F	42	Tyrone Hill	6 ft 9 in (2.06 m)	235 lb (107 kg)	Fr	Cincinnati, Ohio

Head coach

- Pete Gillen (Fairfield)

Assistant coach(es)

Legend

- (C) Team captain
- (S) Suspended
- (I) Ineligible
- (W) Walk-on
- Injured
- Current redshirt

== Schedule and results ==
Date time, TV	Rank^{#}	Opponent^{#}	Result	Record	Site city, state
Regular season
Nov 28, 1986*		vs. Tulsa; Fleet Classic	L 60–70	0–1	Providence Civic Center; Providence, Rhode Island
Nov 29, 1986*		vs. American; Fleet Classic	L 90–92 ^{OT}	0–2	Providence Civic Center; Providence, Rhode Island
Dec 1, 1986*		Saint Joseph's (IN)	W 88–68	1–2	Cincinnati Gardens; Cincinnati, Ohio
Dec 3, 1986*		John Carroll	W 104–92	2–2	Cincinnati Gardens; Cincinnati, Ohio
Dec 6, 1986*		Ohio Dominican	W 101–69	3–2	Cincinnati Gardens; Cincinnati, Ohio
Dec 8, 1986*		at No. 17 Pittsburgh	L 76–99	3–3	Fitzgerald Field House; Pittsburgh, Pennsylvania
Dec 11, 1986*		Hanover	W 97–75	4–3	Cincinnati Gardens; Cincinnati, Ohio
Dec 13, 1986*		Creighton	L 73–74	4–4	Cincinnati Gardens; Cincinnati, Ohio
Dec 20, 1986*		Miami (OH)	W 73–55	5–4	Cincinnati Gardens; Cincinnati, Ohio
Dec 23, 1986*		Colgate	W 84–68	6–4	Cincinnati Gardens; Cincinnati, Ohio
Dec 27, 1986*		at Dayton	L 65–69	6–5	
Dec 30, 1986*		Duquesne	W 78–67	7–5	Cincinnati Gardens; Cincinnati, Ohio
Jan 3, 1987*		Coastal Carolina	W 75–69	8–5	Cincinnati Gardens; Cincinnati, Ohio
Feb 2, 1987*		at Rutgers	L 69–83	11–10	Louis Brown Athletic Center; Piscataway, New Jersey
Feb 19, 1987		Butler	W 69–67	14–12 (6–5)	Cincinnati Gardens; Cincinnati, Ohio
Feb 21, 1987		Oral Roberts	W 81–73 ^{2OT}	15–12 (7–5)	Cincinnati Gardens; Cincinnati, Ohio
Midwestern Collegiate Conference tournament
Feb 26, 1987*	(3)	vs. (6) Butler; Quarterfinals	W 104–98	16–12	Market Square Arena; Indianapolis, Indiana
Feb 27, 1987*	(3)	vs. (2) Loyola (IL); Semifinals	W 82–74	17–12	Market Square Arena; Indianapolis, Indiana
Feb 28, 1987*	(3)	vs. (4) Saint Louis; Championship game	W 81–69	18–12	Market Square Arena; Indianapolis, Indiana
NCAA Tournament
Mar 12, 1987*	(13 MW)	vs. (4 MW) No. 14 Missouri; First round	W 70–69	19–12	RCA Dome; Indianapolis, Indiana
Mar 14, 1987*	(13 MW)	vs. (5 MW) No. 17 Duke; Second round	L 60–65	19–13	RCA Dome; Indianapolis, Indiana
*Non-conference game. ^{#}Rankings from AP Poll. (#) Tournament seedings in parentheses. MW=Midwest. All times are in Eastern Time.
