= 1987–88 Xavier Musketeers men's basketball team =

American college basketball season

1987–88 Xavier Musketeers men's basketball

MCC Regular season champions MCC tournament champions

NCAA tournament, first round
- Conference: Midwestern Collegiate Conference

Ranking
- Coaches: No. 19
- AP: No. 18
- Record: 26–4 (9–1 MCC)
- Head coach: Pete Gillen (2nd season)
- Assistant coach: Dino Gaudio (1st season)
- Home arena: Cincinnati Gardens

1987–88 Midwestern Collegiate Conference men's basketball standings
	Conf.				Overall
Team	W		L	PCT	W		L	PCT
No. 18 Xavier †	9	–	1	.900	26	–	4	.867
Evansville	6	–	4	.600	21	–	8	.724
Saint Louis	5	–	5	.500	14	–	14	.500
Butler	5	–	5	.500	14	–	14	.500
Loyola (IL)	3	–	7	.300	13	–	16	.448
Detroit Mercy	2	–	8	.200	7	–	23	.233
† 1988 MCC tournament winner Rankings from AP

The 1987–88 Xavier Musketeers men's basketball team represented Xavier University from Cincinnati, Ohio in the 1987–88 season. Led by head coach Pete Gillen, the Musketeers played their home games at Cincinnati Gardens in Cincinnati, Ohio. After opening the season 2–2, Xavier won 24 of its next 25 games on its way to winning regular season and MCC tournament titles. The team earned an automatic bid to the NCAA tournament as No. 11 seed in the Midwest region – despite a No. 18 ranking in the AP poll. In the NCAA tournament, the Musketeers fell in the opening round to No. 6 seed and eventual National champion Kansas, 85–72. Xavier finished with a 26–4 record (9–1 MCC).

== Roster ==
1987–88 Xavier Musketeers men's basketball team
Players
Coaches

Pos.	#	Name	Height	Weight	Year	Hometown
G	10	Jamal Walker	5 ft 11 in (1.8 m)	—	Fr
PG	11	Stan Kimbrough	5 ft 11 in (1.8 m)	150 lb (68 kg)	Jr	Cleveland, Ohio
SG	23	Byron Larkin	6 ft 3 in (1.91 m)	185 lb (84 kg)	Sr	Cincinnati, Ohio
F	33	Derek Strong	6 ft 8 in (2.03 m)	215 lb (98 kg)	Fr	Los Angeles, California
F	42	Tyrone Hill	6 ft 9 in (2.06 m)	235 lb (107 kg)	So	Cincinnati, Ohio

Head coach

- Pete Gillen (Fairfield)

Assistant coach(es)

Legend

- (C) Team captain
- (S) Suspended
- (I) Ineligible
- (W) Walk-on
- Injured
- Current redshirt

== Schedule and results ==
Date time, TV	Rank^{#}	Opponent^{#}	Result	Record	Site city, state
Regular season
Dec 5, 1987*		at Marquette	L 61–67	0–1	MECCA Arena; Milwaukee, Wisconsin
Dec 8, 1987*		Delaware State	W 100–77	1–1	Cincinnati Gardens; Cincinnati, Ohio
Dec 12, 1987*		at Miami (OH)	W 91–73	2–1	Millett Hall; Oxford, Ohio
Dec 22, 1987*		at Providence	L 76–96	2–2	Providence Civic Center; Providence, Rhode Island
Dec 29, 1987*		Canisius	W 87–56	3–2	Cincinnati Gardens; Cincinnati, Ohio
Jan 2, 1988*		Kent State	W 92–87	4–2	Cincinnati Gardens; Cincinnati, Ohio
Jan 6, 1988*		at Western Michigan	W 82–70	5–2	University Arena; Kalamazoo, Michigan
Jan 9, 1988*		Florida International	W 125–84	6–2	Cincinnati Gardens; Cincinnati, Ohio
Jan 12, 1988*		Cincinnati	W 98–80	7–2	Cincinnati Gardens; Cincinnati, Ohio
Jan 16, 1988		Loyola–Chicago	W 98–90	8–2 (1–0)	Cincinnati Gardens; Cincinnati, Ohio
Jan 18, 1988		Detroit Mercy	W 105–84	9–2 (2–0)	Cincinnati Gardens; Cincinnati, Ohio
Jan 23, 1988		at Evansville	L 84–86	9–3 (2–1)	Roberts Municipal Stadium; Evansville, Indiana
Jan 25, 1988		at Saint Louis	W 100–86	10–3 (3–1)	Kiel Auditorium; St. Louis, Missouri
Jan 30, 1988*		vs. Saint Peter's	W 78–75	11–3	
Feb 3, 1988*		Wright State	W 101–84	12–3	Cincinnati Gardens; Cincinnati, Ohio
Feb 6, 1988		Butler	W 89–74	13–3 (4–1)	Cincinnati Gardens; Cincinnati, Ohio
Feb 8, 1988*		Western Michigan	W 100–84	14–3	Cincinnati Gardens; Cincinnati, Ohio
Feb 13, 1988		at Loyola–Chicago	W 94–83	15–3 (5–1)	International Amphitheatre; Chicago, Illinois
Feb 15, 1988		at Detroit Mercy	W 114–97	16–3 (6–1)	Calihan Hall; Detroit, Michigan
Feb 20, 1988		Evansville	W 102–79	17–3 (7–1)	Cincinnati Gardens; Cincinnati, Ohio
Feb 22, 1988		Saint Louis	W 93–70	18–3 (8–1)	Cincinnati Gardens; Cincinnati, Ohio
Feb 24, 1988*		at Florida International	W 122–95	19–3	U.S. Century Bank Arena; Miami, Florida
Feb 27, 1988*		Dayton	W 86–73	20–3	Cincinnati Gardens; Cincinnati, Ohio
Mar 1, 1988*	No. 20	at Niagara	W 93–80	21–3	Buffalo Memorial Auditorium; Lewiston, New York
Mar 6, 1988	No. 20	at Butler	W 71–70	22–3 (9–1)	Hinkle Fieldhouse; Indianapolis, Indiana
Midwestern Collegiate Conference tournament
Mar 11, 1988*	No. 20	vs. Loyola–Chicago; Semifinals	W 117–79	25–3	Market Square Arena; Indianapolis, Indiana
Mar 12, 1988*	No. 20	vs. Detroit Mercy; Championship game	W 122–96	26–3	Market Square Arena; Indianapolis, Indiana
NCAA Tournament
Mar 18, 1988*	(11 MW) No. 18	vs. (6 MW) Kansas; First Round	L 72–85	26–4	Bob Devaney Sports Center; Lincoln, Nebraska
*Non-conference game. ^{#}Rankings from AP Poll. (#) Tournament seedings in parentheses. MW=Midwest. All times are in Eastern Time.

== Awards and honors ==
- Byron Larkin – MCC Player of the Year
