= 2022–23 Xavier Musketeers men's basketball team =

2022–23 Xavier Musketeers men's basketball

NCAA tournament, Sweet Sixteen
- Conference: Big East Conference

Ranking
- Coaches: No. 15
- AP: No. 13
- Record: 27–10 (15–5 Big East)
- Head coach: Sean Miller (1st, 6th overall season)
- Associate head coach: Adam Cohen (1st season)
- Assistant coaches: Dante Jackson (5th season); David Miller (1st season)
- Home arena: Cintas Center

2022–23 Big East men's basketball standings
	Conf.				Overall
Team	W		L	PCT	W		L	PCT
No. 6 Marquette †	17	–	3	.850	29	–	7	.806
No. 13 Xavier	15	–	5	.750	27	–	10	.730
Creighton	14	–	6	.700	24	–	13	.649
No. 10 UConn	13	–	7	.650	31	–	8	.795
Providence	13	–	7	.650	21	–	12	.636
Villanova	10	–	10	.500	17	–	17	.500
Seton Hall	10	–	10	.500	17	–	16	.515
St. John's	7	–	13	.350	18	–	15	.545
Butler	6	–	14	.300	14	–	18	.438
DePaul	3	–	17	.150	10	–	23	.303
Georgetown	2	–	18	.100	7	–	25	.219
† 2023 Big East tournament winner Rankings from AP poll

The 2022–23 Xavier Musketeers men's basketball team represented Xavier University during the 2022–23 NCAA Division I men's basketball season as a member of the Big East Conference. Led by Sean Miller in the first season of his second stint after coaching the Musketeers from 2004 to 2009, they played their home games at the Cintas Center in Cincinnati, Ohio. The Musketeers finished the season 23–8, 15–5 in Big East play to finish in second place. In the Big East tournament, they defeated DePaul and Creighton to reach the championship game, where they were defeated by Marquette. The team received an at-large bid to the NCAA Tournament, where they defeated Kennesaw State and Pittsburgh to advance to the Sweet Sixteen for the first time since 2017. There they were defeated by Texas, bringing their season to a close with a final record of 27–10.

== Previous season ==
The Musketeers finished the 2021–22 season 23–13, 8–11 in Big East play to finish in a tie for seventh place. They lost in the first round of the Big East tournament to Butler. The team received an at-large bid to the National Invitation Tournament where they defeated Cleveland State, Florida, Vanderbilt, and St. Bonaventure to advance to the championship game. There they defeated Texas A&M to win the NIT championship.

Head coach Travis Steele was fired on March 16, 2022, the day after the first win in the NIT. Assistant coach Jonas Hayes was named the interim head coach and coached the team for the four remaining games in the NIT.

On March 19, the school named former Xavier and Arizona head coach Sean Miller the team's new head coach. Miller previously coached the Musketeers from 2004 to 2009.

== Offseason ==
=== Departures ===
Name	Number	Pos.	Height	Weight	Year	Hometown	Reason for departure
Paul Scruggs	1	G	6'5"	198	GS Senior	Indianapolis, IN	Graduated
Nate Johnson	10	G	6'4"	192	GS Senior	Miami, FL	Graduated
Dwon Odom	11	G	6'2"	182	Sophomore	Alpharetta, GA	Transferred to Georgia State
Zak Swetye	12	G	6'1"	187	Senior	Darien, CT	Walk-on; graduated
Ben Stanley	14	F	6'6"	225	RS Senior	Baltimore, MD	Graduate transferred to Old Dominion
Ramon Singh	20	G	6'4"	187	Senior	Sydney, Australia	Walk-on; graduated
Spencer Cody	25	G	5'11"	185	Senior	Chicago, IL	Walk-on; graduated

=== Incoming transfers ===
Name	Num	Pos.	Height	Weight	Year	Hometown	Previous School
Souley Boum	0	G	6'3"	165	GS Senior	Oakland, CA	UTEP
Brad Colbert	45	G	6'2"	185	Sophomore	Loveland, OH	Walk-on; Louisville

=== Recruiting classes ===
==== 2022 recruiting class ====
College recruiting information
Name	Hometown	School	Height	Weight	Commit date
Kam Craft #10 SG	Buffalo Grove, IL	The Skill Factory Prep School	6 ft 4 in (1.93 m)	185 lb (84 kg)	Jul 12, 2021
Kam Craft #10 SG	Recruit ratings: Scout: Rivals: 247Sports: (84)				
Desmond Claude #18 SG	Putnam, CT	Putnam Science Academy	6 ft 5 in (1.96 m)	190 lb (86 kg)	Jan 20, 2022
Desmond Claude #18 SG	Recruit ratings: Scout: Rivals: 247Sports: (82)				
Overall recruit ranking:
Note: In many cases, Scout, Rivals, 247Sports, On3, and ESPN may conflict in their listings of height and weight.; In these cases, the average was taken. ESPN grades are on a 100-point scale.; Sources: "Xavier 2022 Basketball Commitments". Rivals.; "2022 Xavier Musketeers Recruiting Class". ESPN.; "2022 Team Ranking". Rivals.; "Xavier 2022 Basketball Commits". 247Sports.

==== 2023 recruiting class ====
College recruiting information (2023)
Name	Hometown	School	Height	Weight	Commit date
Trey Green #31 PG	Charlotte, N.C.	Link Academy	5 ft 9 in (1.75 m)	160 lb (73 kg)	Aug 6, 2022
Trey Green #31 PG	Recruit ratings: Scout: Rivals: 247Sports: (86)				
Dailyn Swain #23 SF	Columbus, OH	Columbus Africentric High School	6 ft 7 in (2.01 m)	185 lb (84 kg)	Sep 2, 2022
Dailyn Swain #23 SF	Recruit ratings: Scout: Rivals: 247Sports: (82)				
Reid Ducharme #29 SF	Milton, MA	Brewster Academy	6 ft 6 in (1.98 m)	190 lb (86 kg)	Aug 25, 2022
Reid Ducharme #29 SF	Recruit ratings: Scout: Rivals: 247Sports: (82)				
Kachi Nzeh #56 C	Newtown, PA	George School	6 ft 8 in (2.03 m)	220 lb (100 kg)	Sep 8, 2022
Kachi Nzeh #56 C	Recruit ratings: Scout: Rivals: 247Sports: (76)				
Overall recruit ranking:
Note: In many cases, Scout, Rivals, 247Sports, On3, and ESPN may conflict in their listings of height and weight.; In these cases, the average was taken. ESPN grades are on a 100-point scale.; Sources: "Xavier 2023 Basketball Commitments". Rivals.; "2023 Xavier Musketeers Recruiting Class". ESPN.; "2023 Team Ranking". Rivals.; "Xavier 2023 Basketball Commits". 247Sports.

== Roster ==
2022–23 Xavier Musketeers men's basketball team
Players
Coaches

Pos.	#	Name	Height	Weight	Year	Previous school	Hometown
G	0	Souley Boum	6 ft 3 in (1.91 m)	175 lb (79 kg)	GS	UTEP	Oakland, CA
G	1	Desmond Claude	6 ft 5 in (1.96 m)	195 lb (88 kg)	Fr	Putnam Science Academy	New Haven, CT
F	2	Jerome Hunter	6 ft 8 in (2.03 m)	210 lb (95 kg)	RS Sr	Indiana	Columbus, OH
G	3	Colby Jones	6 ft 6 in (1.98 m)	205 lb (93 kg)	Jr	Mountain Brook HS	Birmingham, AL
F	4	Cesare Edwards	6 ft 9 in (2.06 m)	225 lb (102 kg)	So	Hartsville HS	Hartsville, SC
G	5	Adam Kunkel	6 ft 4 in (1.93 m)	185 lb (84 kg)	GS	Belmont	Hebron, KY
F	12	Kam Craft	6 ft 6 in (1.98 m)	205 lb (93 kg)	Fr	The Skill Factory (GA)	Buffalo Grove, IL
G	15	KyKy Tandy	6 ft 2 in (1.88 m)	190 lb (86 kg)	Sr	University Heights Academy	Hopkinsville, KY
F	22	Dieonte Miles	7 ft 0 in (2.13 m)	240 lb (109 kg)	RS Jr	Walton-Verona HS	Walton, KY
F	24	Jack Nunge	7 ft 0 in (2.13 m)	245 lb (111 kg)	RS Sr	Iowa	Newburgh, IN
G	25	Michael Wolf (W)	6 ft 0 in (1.83 m)	185 lb (84 kg)	Fr	Bridgton Academy	Greenwood Village, CO
F	32	Zach Freemantle (injured)	6 ft 9 in (2.06 m)	225 lb (102 kg)	Sr	Bergen Catholic HS	Teaneck, NJ
F	34	Elijah Tucker	6 ft 7 in (2.01 m)	214 lb (97 kg)	So	Cherokee HS	Canton, GA
G	35	Bob Nunge (W)	6 ft 6 in (1.98 m)	195 lb (88 kg)	So	Castle HS	Newburgh, IN
G	45	Brad Colbert (W)	6 ft 2 in (1.88 m)	190 lb (86 kg)	So	Louisville	Loveland, OH

Head coach

- Sean Miller (Pittsburgh)

Assistant coach(es)

- Adam Cohen (Arizona)
- Dante Jackson (Xavier)
- David Miller (Arizona)

Legend

- (C) Team captain
- (S) Suspended
- (I) Ineligible
- (W) Walk-on
- Injured
- Current redshirt

Roster

== Schedule and results ==
Date time, TV	Rank^{#}	Opponent^{#}	Result	Record	High points	High rebounds	High assists	Site (attendance) city, state
Exhibition
November 2, 2022*; 7:00 p.m.		Kentucky Wesleyan	W 80–62		32 – Freemantle	13 – Freemantle	6 – Jones	Cintas Center (9,850); Cincinnati, OH
Non-conference regular season
November 7, 2022*; 7:30 p.m., FS1		Morgan State	W 96–73	1–0	23 – Boum	9 – Hunter	9 – Jones	Cintas Center (10,224); Cincinnati, OH
November 11, 2022*; 8:00 p.m., FS2		Montana	W 86–64	2–0	18 – Freemantle	4 – Tied	5 – Tied	Cintas Center (10,311); Cincinnati, OH
November 15, 2022*; 9:00 p.m., FS2		Fairfield	W 78–65	3–0	23 – Nunge	13 – Freemantle	10 – Freemantle	Cintas Center (9,624); Cincinnati, OH
November 18, 2022*; 6:00 p.m., FS1		No. 12 Indiana; Gavitt Tipoff Games	L 79–81	3–1	15 – Tied	8 – Nunge	6 – Jones	Cintas Center (10,586); Cincinnati, OH
November 24, 2022*; 5:30 p.m., ESPN2		vs. Florida; Phil Knight Legacy quarterfinals	W 90–83	4–1	22 – Tied	11 – Freemantle	6 – Boum	Veterans Memorial Coliseum (4,465); Portland, OR
November 25, 2022*; 3:30 p.m., ESPN		vs. No. 8 Duke; Phil Knight Legacy semifinals	L 64–71	4–2	23 – Boum	7 – Jones	4 – Jones	Moda Center; Portland, OR
November 26, 2022*; 7:30 p.m., ESPN		vs. No. 6 Gonzaga; Phil Knight Legacy third place game	L 84–88	4–3	25 – Nunge	7 – Tied	7 – Jones	Veterans Memorial Coliseum; Portland, OR
November 30, 2022*; 8:30 p.m., FS1		Southeastern Louisiana	W 95–63	5–3	16 – Jones	12 – Freemantle	7 – Jones	Cintas Center (9,811); Cincinnati, OH
December 3, 2022*; 6:30 p.m., FS1		West Virginia; Big East–Big 12 Battle	W 84–74	6–3	23 – Boum	14 – Nunge	7 – Boum	Cintas Center (10,460); Cincinnati, OH
December 10, 2022*; 3:30 p.m., ESPN2		at Cincinnati; Crosstown Shootout	W 80–77	7–3	21 – Boum	12 – Freemantle	4 – Jones	Fifth Third Arena (12,012); Cincinnati, OH
December 13, 2022*; 7:00 p.m., FS1		Southern	W 79–59	8–3	17 – Boum	8 – Freemantle	7 – Boum	Cintas Center (10,029); Cincinnati, OH
Big East regular season
December 16, 2022; 6:30 p.m., FS1		at Georgetown	W 102–89	9–3 (1–0)	28 – Boum	12 – Nunge	8 – Jones	Capital One Arena (5,785); Washington, D.C.
December 20, 2022; 8:30 p.m., FS1		Seton Hall	W 73–70	10–3 (2–0)	23 – Freemantle	9 – Freemantle	7 – Boum	Cintas Center (10,224); Cincinnati, OH
December 28, 2022; 9:00 p.m., FS1	No. 22	at St. John's	W 84–79	11–3 (3–0)	23 – Nunge	12 – Nunge	6 – Boum	Carnesecca Arena (4,368); Queens, NY
December 31, 2022; 12:00 p.m., FOX	No. 22	No. 2 UConn	W 83–73	12–3 (4–0)	16 – Tied	11 – Freemantle	5 – Tied	Cintas Center (10,565); Cincinnati, OH
January 7, 2023; 4:30 p.m., FS1	No. 18	at Villanova	W 88–80	13–3 (5–0)	29 – Freemantle	11 – Freemantle	6 – Tied	Finneran Pavilion (6,501); Villanova, PA
January 11, 2023; 7:00 p.m., FS1	No. 12	Creighton	W 90–87	14–3 (6–0)	26 – Boum	12 – Nunge	8 – Boum	Cintas Center (10,224); Cincinnati, OH
January 15, 2023; 12:00 p.m., FOX	No. 12	No. 25 Marquette	W 80–76	15–3 (7–0)	16 – Tied	13 – Nunge	5 – Tied	Cintas Center (10,508); Cincinnati, OH
January 18, 2023; 8:30 p.m., FS1	No. 8	at DePaul	L 72–73	15–4 (7–1)	18 – Freemantle	13 – Nunge	6 – Boum	Wintrust Arena (4,252); Chicago, IL
January 21, 2023; 12:00 p.m., FS1	No. 8	Georgetown	W 95–82	16–4 (8–1)	30 – Freemantle	11 – Freemantle	7 – Tied	Cintas Center (10,383); Cincinnati, OH
January 25, 2023; 6:30 p.m., FS1	No. 13	at No. 19 UConn	W 82–79	17–4 (9–1)	21 – Boum	7 – Nunge	4 – Tied	Harry A. Gampel Pavilion (10,167); Storrs, CT
January 28, 2023; 12:15 p.m., CBS	No. 13	at Creighton	L 67–84	17–5 (9–2)	18 – Freemantle	7 – Kunkel	4 – Tied	CHI Health Center Omaha (18,277); Omaha, NE
February 1, 2023; 6:30 p.m., FS1	No. 16	No. 17 Providence	W 85–83 ^{OT}	18–5 (10–2)	23 – Nunge	14 – Nunge	9 – Boum	Cintas Center (10,334); Cincinnati, OH
February 4, 2023; 5:00 p.m., FOX	No. 16	St. John's	W 96–71	19–5 (11–2)	21 – Nunge	8 – Jones	6 – Nunge	Cintas Center (10,436); Cincinnati, OH
February 10, 2023; 7:00 p.m., FS1	No. 13	at Butler	L 67–69	19–6 (11–3)	17 – Jones	8 – Tied	3 – Tied	Hinkle Fieldhouse (9,352); Indianapolis, IN
February 15, 2023; 7:00 p.m., CBSSN	No. 16	at No. 11 Marquette	L 68–69	19–7 (11–4)	24 – Boum	8 – Jones	5 – Jones	Fiserv Forum (16,041); Milwaukee, WI
February 18, 2023; 4:00 p.m., CBSSN	No. 16	DePaul	W 82–68	20–7 (12–4)	18 – Nunge	10 – Nunge	8 – Kinkel	Cintas Center (10,403); Cincinnati, OH
February 21, 2023; 6:30 p.m., FS1	No. 16	Villanova	L 63–64	20–8 (12–5)	17 – Boum	10 – Nunge	7 – Jones	Cintas Center (10,349); Cincinnati, OH
February 24, 2023; 7:00 p.m., FS1	No. 16	at Seton Hall	W 82–60	21–8 (13–5)	23 – Boum	9 – Hunter	5 – Nunge	Prudential Center (10,481); Newark, NJ
March 1, 2023; 6:30 p.m., FS1	No. 19	at No. 20 Providence	W 94–89	22–8 (14–5)	33 – Boum	9 – Jones	4 – Tied	Amica Mutual Pavilion (12,400); Providence, RI
March 4, 2023; 7:00 p.m., FS1	No. 19	Butler	W 78–66	23–8 (15–5)	20 – Jones	8 – Jones	4 – Tied	Cintas Center (10,398); Cincinnati, OH
Big East tournament
March 9, 2023; 7:00 p.m., FS1	(2) No. 15	vs. (10) DePaul; Quarterfinals	W 89–84	24–8	23 – Nunge	10 – Nunge	4 – Nunge	Madison Square Garden (19,812); New York, NY
March 10, 2023; 9:00 p.m., FS1	(2) No. 15	vs. (3) No. 24 Creighton; Semifinals	W 82–60	25–8	23 – Boum	10 – Jones	6 – Boum	Madison Square Garden (19,812); New York, NY
March 11, 2023; 6:30 p.m., FOX	(2) No. 15	vs. (1) No. 6 Marquette; Championship	L 51–65	25–9	14 – Kunkel	8 – Hunter	3 – Claude	Madison Square Garden (19,812); New York, NY
NCAA tournament
March 17, 2023*; 12:40 pm, TruTV	(3 MW) No. 13	vs. (14 MW) Kennesaw State; First Round	W 72–67	26–9	24 – Hunter	11 – Nunge	6 – Kunkle	Greensboro Coliseum; Greensboro, NC
March 19, 2023*; 12:10 pm, CBS	(3 MW) No. 13	vs. (11 MW) Pittsburgh; Second Round	W 84–73	27–9	18 – Nunge	14 – Jones	7 – Jones	Greensboro Coliseum; Greensboro, NC
March 24, 2023*; 9:45 p.m., CBS	(3 MW) No. 13	vs. (2 MW) No. 5 Texas; Sweet Sixteen	L 71–83	27–10	21 – Kunkel	11 – Nunge	6 – Jones	T-Mobile Center (17,429); Kansas City, MO
*Non-conference game. ^{#}Rankings from AP Poll. (#) Tournament seedings in parentheses. All times are in Eastern Time.

== Rankings ==
Ranking movements Legend: ██ Increase in ranking ██ Decrease in ranking — = Not ranked RV = Received votes т = Tied with team above or below
	Week																			
Poll	Pre	1	2	3	4	5	6	7	8	9	10	11	12	13	14	15	16	17	18	Final
AP	RV	RV	RV	—	RV	RV	RV	22т	18	12	8	13	16	13	16	16	19	15	13	Not released
Coaches	RV	RV	RV	RV	RV	RV	RV	25	18	11	8	12	15	15	16	15	17	15	14	15

*AP does not release post-NCAA Tournament rankings.
