= 1988 Midwestern Collegiate Conference men's basketball tournament =

1988 men's basketball tournament in Indianapolis, Indiana

- Classification: Division I
- Season: 1987–88
- Teams: 6
- Site: Market Square Arena; Indianapolis, Indiana
- Champions: Xavier (4th title)
- Winning coach: Pete Gillen (3rd title)
- MVP: Byron Larkin (3rd MVP) (Xavier)

1987–88 Midwestern Collegiate Conference men's basketball standings
| | Conf. | | | | Overall |
| Team | W | | L | PCT | W | | L | PCT |
|---|---|---|---|---|---|---|---|---|
| No. 18 Xavier † | 9 | – | 1 | .900 | 26 | – | 4 | .867 |
| Evansville | 6 | – | 4 | .600 | 21 | – | 8 | .724 |
| Saint Louis | 5 | – | 5 | .500 | 14 | – | 14 | .500 |
| Butler | 5 | – | 5 | .500 | 14 | – | 14 | .500 |
| Loyola (IL) | 3 | – | 7 | .300 | 13 | – | 16 | .448 |
| Detroit Mercy | 2 | – | 8 | .200 | 7 | – | 23 | .233 |
† 1988 MCC tournament winner Rankings from AP

The 1988 Midwestern Collegiate Conference men's basketball tournament (now known as the Horizon League men's basketball tournament) was held March 10–12 at Market Square Arena in Indianapolis, Indiana.

Xavier defeated Detroit in the championship game, 122–96, to win their third consecutive (fourth overall) MCC/Horizon League men's basketball tournament.

The Musketeers received an automatic bid to the 1988 NCAA tournament as the #11 seed in the Midwest region.

== Format ==
All six conference members participated in the tournament and were seeded based on regular season conference records, with the top two teams (Xavier, Evansville) earning a bye into the semifinal round.

== Bracket ==
Quarterfinals; Friday, March 10
4 | Butler | 59
5 | Loyola-Chicago | 67
3 | Saint Louis | 63
6 | Detroit | 66

Semifinals; Saturday, March 11
1 | #20 Xavier | 117
5 | Loyola-Chicago | 79
6 | Detroit | 75
2 | Evansville | 74

Championship; Sunday, March 12
1 | #20 Xavier | 122
2 | Detroit | 96
