= 1987 Midwestern Collegiate Conference men's basketball tournament =

- Classification: Division I
- Season: 1986–87
- Teams: 7
- Site: Market Square Arena; Indianapolis, Indiana
- Champions: Xavier (3rd title)
- Winning coach: Pete Gillen (2nd title)
- MVP: Byron Larkin (2nd MVP) (Xavier)

1986–87 Midwestern Collegiate Conference men's basketball standings
	Conf.				Overall
Team	W		L	PCT	W		L	PCT
Evansville	8	–	4	.667	16	–	12	.571
Loyola (IL)	8	–	4	.667	16	–	13	.552
Xavier †	7	–	5	.583	19	–	13	.594
Saint Louis	7	–	5	.583	25	–	10	.714
Oral Roberts	5	–	7	.417	10	–	18	.357
Butler	2	–	10	.167	9	–	19	.321
Detroit Mercy	2	–	10	.167	7	–	21	.250
† 1987 MCC tournament winner

The 1987 Midwestern Collegiate Conference men's basketball tournament (now known as the Horizon League men's basketball tournament) was held February 26–28 at Market Square Arena in Indianapolis, Indiana.

Xavier defeated Saint Louis in the championship game, 81–69, to win their third MCC/Horizon League men's basketball tournament.

The Musketeers received an automatic bid to the 1987 NCAA tournament as the #13 seed in the Midwest region.

== Format ==
All seven conference members participated in the tournament and were seeded based on regular season conference records.

== Bracket ==
Quarterfinals; Friday, February 26
4	Saint Louis	75
5	Oral Roberts	64
3	Xavier	104
6	Butler	98
7	Detroit	75
2	Loyola–Chicago	80

Semifinals; Saturday, February 27
1	Evansville	51
4	Saint Louis	55
3	Xavier	82
2	Loyola–Chicago	74

Championship; Sunday, February 28
4	Saint Louis	69
2	Xavier	81
