= Darwin Davis =

American basketball player

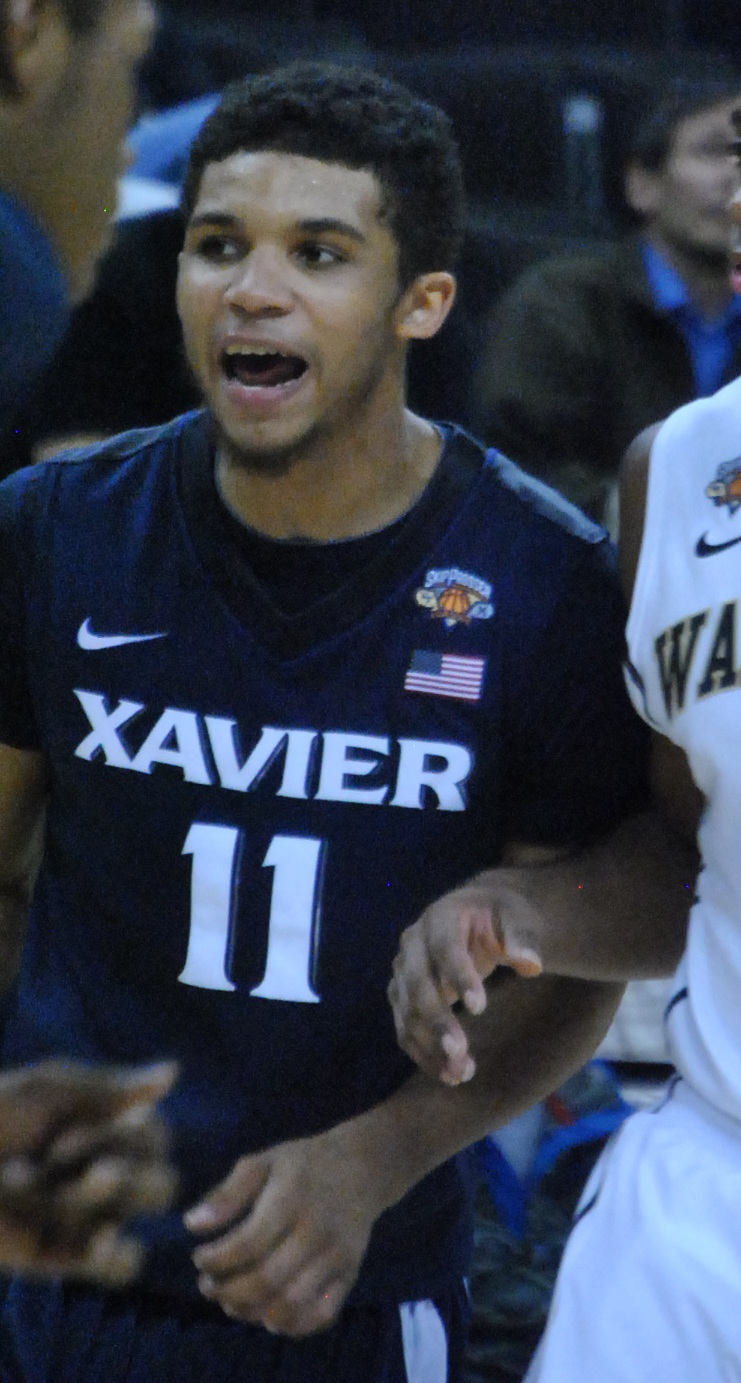
- Davis playing for Xavier

Personal information
- Born: March 10, 1993 (age 33) Bloomington, Indiana, U.S.
- Listed height: 6 ft 0 in (1.83 m)
- Listed weight: 169.4 lb (77 kg)

Career information
- High school: Bloomington South (Bloomington, Indiana)
- College: Xavier (2011–2015)
- NBA draft: 2015: undrafted
- Playing career: 2015–present
- Position: Point guard

Career history
- 2015–2017: Rogaška
- 2017–2018: Gießen 46ers
- 2018–2019: Hermine Nantes Basket
- 2019–2020: Szolnoki Olaj
- 2021-2022: Apop Paphou
- 2022–2023: Haukar
- 2023–2024: Þór Þorlákshöfn
- 2025–2026: URB35

Darwin "Dee" Davis (born March 10, 1993) is an American basketball player. He played college basketball for Xavier.

== Professional career ==
After going undrafted in the 2015 NBA draft, Davis joined the NBA Development League team Canton Charge for the training camp. In December 2015, Davis signed his first professional contract with Slovenian club Rogaška. In the 2016–2017 season Davis was named to First Team Slovenian League, First Team All-Imports Team, All-Defensive Team and Slovenian Guard of the Year.

On June 9, 2017, Davis signed with German club Gießen 46ers. He averaged 13.5 points and 4.6 assists per game with the 46ers.

On July 5, 2018, he joined the French club Nantes Basket in Pro B championship (second national level).

In August 2022, Davis signed with Haukar of the Úrvalsdeild karla. in Iceland.

In 18 regular season games, he averaged 18.6 points and 4.8 assists, helping Haukar to the third best record in the league. Illness kept him from three of five playoffs games where he averaged 15.0 points and 5.5 assists in Haukar's 2–3 loss to Þór Þorlákshöfn.

In August 2023, Davis signed with Þór Þorlákshöfn in Iceland.

In July 2025, Davis signed with Union Rennes Basket 35 in Rennes in French Nationale 1 championship (third national level).

== Statistics ==
=== College statistics ===
SEASON AVERAGES
SEASON	TEAM	MIN	FGM-FGA	FG%	3PM-3PA	3P%	FTM-FTA	FT%	REB	AST	BLK	STL	PF	TO	PTS
2014–15	XAV	32.8	3.0–7.4	.404	0.9–2.9	.321	2.0–2.8	.721	2.4	6.0	0.0	1.3	2.4	2.4	9.0
2013–14	XAV	31.2	2.4–6.1	.398	1.2–3.3	.371	1.6–1.8	.847	1.8	4.7	0.0	1.2	2.7	1.9	7.7
2012–13	XAV	28.8	2.5–6.4	.393	1.3–3.4	.368	1.9–2.6	.730	1.7	3.4	0.0	0.9	2.8	2.5	8.2
2011–12	XAV	11.1	0.7–2.0	.342	0.3–1.1	.293	0.2–0.3	.500	0.6	0.8	0.0	0.6	1.6	0.8	1.9
