= Trevon Bluiett =

American basketball player (born 1994)

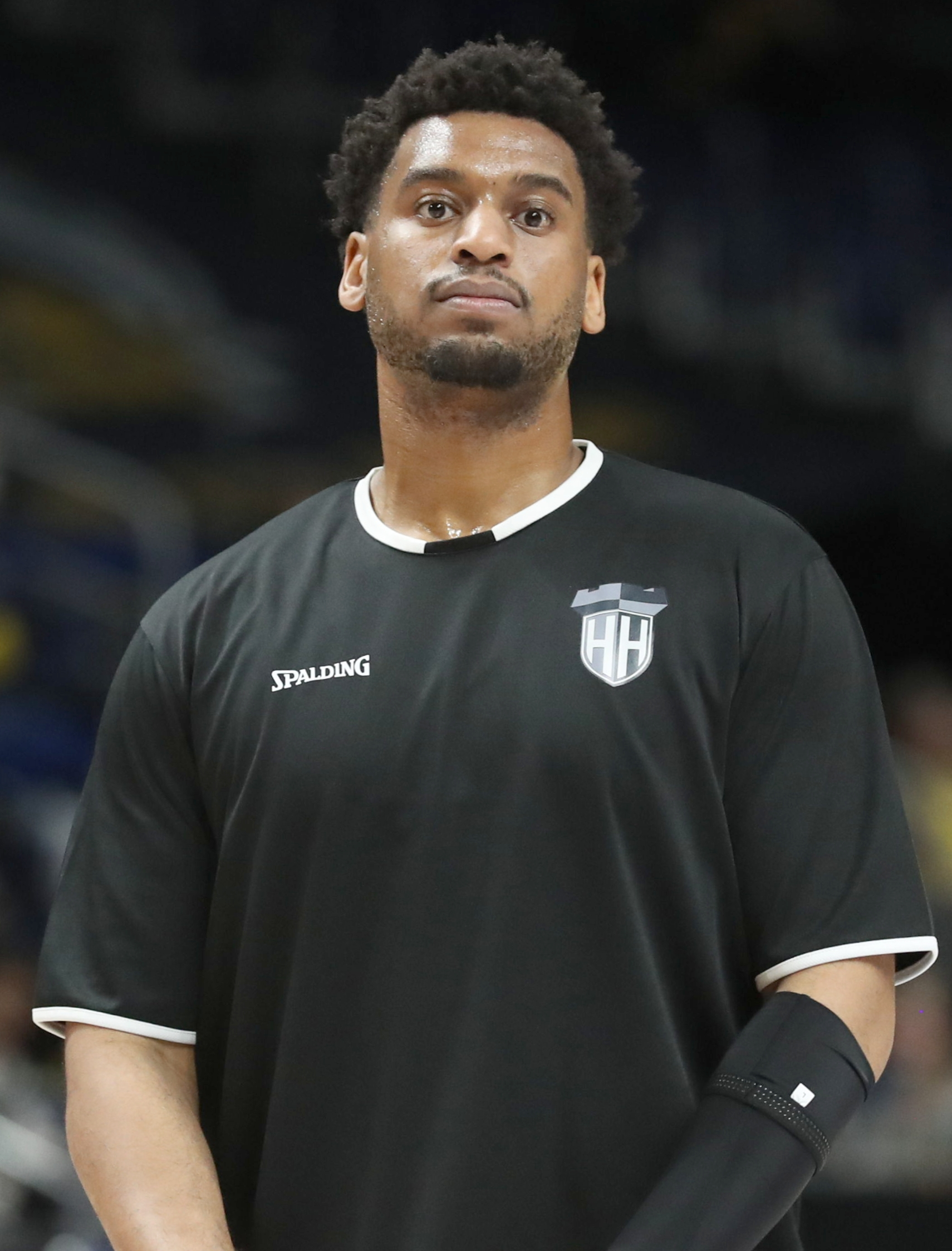

Free Agent
- Position: Shooting guard / small forward

Personal information
- Born: November 5, 1994 (age 32) Indianapolis, Indiana, U.S.
- Listed height: 6 ft 6 in (1.98 m)
- Listed weight: 209 lb (95 kg)

Career information
- High school: Park Tudor (Indianapolis, Indiana)
- College: Xavier (2014–2018)
- NBA draft: 2018: undrafted
- Playing career: 2018–present

Career history
- 2018: Westchester Knicks
- 2019–2021: Salt Lake City Stars
- 2021–2022: Beşiktaş Icrypex
- 2022: Hamburg Towers
- 2022–2023: MKS Dąbrowa Górnicza
- 2023–2024: Victoria Libertas Pesaro
- 2024–2025: Limoges CSP

Career highlights
- Consensus second-team All-American (2018); AP Honorable Mention All-American (2016); 3× First-team All-Big East (2016–2018); Fourth-team Parade All-American (2014); No. 5 retired by Xavier Musketeers
- Stats at NBA.com
- Stats at Basketball Reference

Trevon Nykee Bluiett (/ˈtreɪvɒn ˈbluːɪt/; born November 5, 1994) is an American professional basketball player who last played for Limoges CSP of the LNB Pro A. He played college basketball for the Xavier Musketeers.

== High school career ==
Bluiett attended Park Tudor School. At the school, Bluiett won three IHSAA state titles. Bluiett won two of his three state IHSAA titles with LA Clippers point guard Yogi Ferrell. He won his last state title with 2017 McDonald's All-American Game nominee Jaren Jackson Jr., son of NBA champion Jaren Jackson. Bluiett scored 2,568 points in his career, 6th-highest in Indiana high school history. In his senior season, he averaged 35.7 points and 11.4 rebounds per game. Bluiett scored 38 points in the 2014 2A title game. Bluiett originally committed to UCLA, due in part to the fact that his former coach Ed Schilling was an assistant at UCLA. Bluiett later decommitted from UCLA and reopened his recruitment. After decommitting from UCLA, he committed to Xavier due to the opportunity of competing in the Big East Conference.

College recruiting
Name	Hometown	School	Height	Weight	Commit date
Trevon Bluiett; SF	Indianapolis, IN	Park Tudor (Indiana)	6 ft 5 in (1.96 m)	205 lb (93 kg)	Nov 3, 2013
Trevon Bluiett; SF	Recruit ratings: Scout: Rivals: 247Sports: (87)				
Overall recruit ranking: Scout: 30,10 (SF) Rivals: 34, N/A (SF) 247Sports: 39,11 (SF) ESPN: 46,13 (SF)
Note: In many cases, Scout, Rivals, 247Sports, On3, and ESPN may conflict in their listings of height and weight.; In these cases, the average was taken. ESPN grades are on a 100-point scale.; Sources: "2014 Team Ranking". Rivals.

== College career ==
As a freshman at Xavier, Bluiett was second on the team in scoring at 11.0 points per game. He was a Big East All-Rookie Team honoree. In Xavier's first three games, he averaged 18.0 points and 5.3 rebounds per game and was named Big East Rookie of the Week. He repeated as rookie of the week on February 2 after averaging 15.0 points and 3.5 rebounds per game in games against Georgetown and Seton Hall. However, he admitted to being "lackadaisical and didn't have energy", and he had a slump at the end of the season.

Coming into his sophomore year, Bluiett overhauled his diet and decreased his body fat. He was named to the 35-man mid-season watchlist for the Naismith Trophy on February 11, 2016. At the conclusion of the regular season, Bluiett was selected as a USA Today Third-team All-American as well as selected to the First Team All-Big East. Following the season he entered his name in the NBA Pre-Draft, but withdrew his name prior to the deadline and returned to Xavier.

In a notable performance in his junior year, Bluiett scored 40 points against rivals Cincinnati in the 2017 Crosstown Shootout. Bluiett tied the school record of nine three-pointers, and scored more points than any Xavier player since David West scored 47 in 2003.

On January 24, 2018, Bluiett scored his 2,000th career point, becoming the fifth Musketeer to reach this milestone.

== Professional career ==
After going undrafted in the 2018 NBA draft, Bluiett signed a Summer League deal with the New Orleans Pelicans. On July 17, 2018, Bluiett signed with the Pelicans on a two-way contract. On October 22, Bluiett was sent down to the Westchester Knicks after not appearing in the Pelicans' first two games. On January 2, 2019, the Pelicans transferred Bluiett to the Salt Lake City Stars. Bluiett suffered a thumb injury, undergoing surgery on February 1, 2019. On December 5, 2019, Bluiett scored 29 points with a career-high seven three-pointers in a win over the South Bay Lakers. He missed a game in February 2020 with an illness, but scored 23 points in his return against the Texas Legends.

Bluiett played for Team Zip Em Up with other Xavier alumni in the 2021 edition of The Basketball Tournament and in August 2021, he joined the Cleveland Cavaliers for the NBA Summer League. On September 20, 2021, Bluiett signed with Beşiktaş Icrypex of the Basketbol Süper Ligi. He averaged 6.8 points, 3.2 rebounds, and 1.3 assists per game.

On February 7, 2022, he has signed with Hamburg Towers of the Basketball Bundesliga.

On August 19, 2022, he has signed with MKS Dąbrowa Górnicza of the Polish Basketball League.

On July 18, 2023, he signed with Victoria Libertas Pesaro of the Italian Lega Basket Serie A (LBA).

On August 7, 2024, Bluiett signed with Limoges CSP of the LNB Pro A.

== Personal life ==
Bluiett is the son of Reynardo and Mariam Bluiett. His siblings are Ashtyn, Juwaan, and Brody. Both of his parents served in the United States Marine Corps and fought in Operation Desert Storm in the 1990s. They met while they were both enlisted in the Marines in the late 1980s at Camp Lejeune, in Jacksonville, North Carolina.

== Career statistics ==
Legend
GP	Games played	GS	Games started	MPG	Minutes per game
FG%	Field goal percentage	3P%	3-point field goal percentage	FT%	Free throw percentage
RPG	Rebounds per game	APG	Assists per game	SPG	Steals per game
BPG	Blocks per game	PPG	Points per game	**Bold**	Career high

=== College ===
Year	Team	GP	GS	MPG	FG%	3P%	FT%	RPG	APG	SPG	BPG	PPG
2014–15	Xavier	**37**	32	28.3	.422	.326	.746	4.2	1.9	.6	.1	11.0
2015–16	Xavier	34	34	30.6	.424	.398	.770	**6.1**	2.2	**.9**	**.3**	15.1
2016–17	Xavier	36	**36**	**35.1**	**.438**	.371	.754	5.7	2.1	**.9**	.1	18.5
2017–18	Xavier	35	34	34.3	.437	**.417**	**.848**	5.5	**2.5**	.7	**.3**	**19.3**
Career		142	136	32.1	.431	.384	.784	5.4	2.2	.8	.2	15.9
