= Tu Holloway =

American basketball player (born 1989)

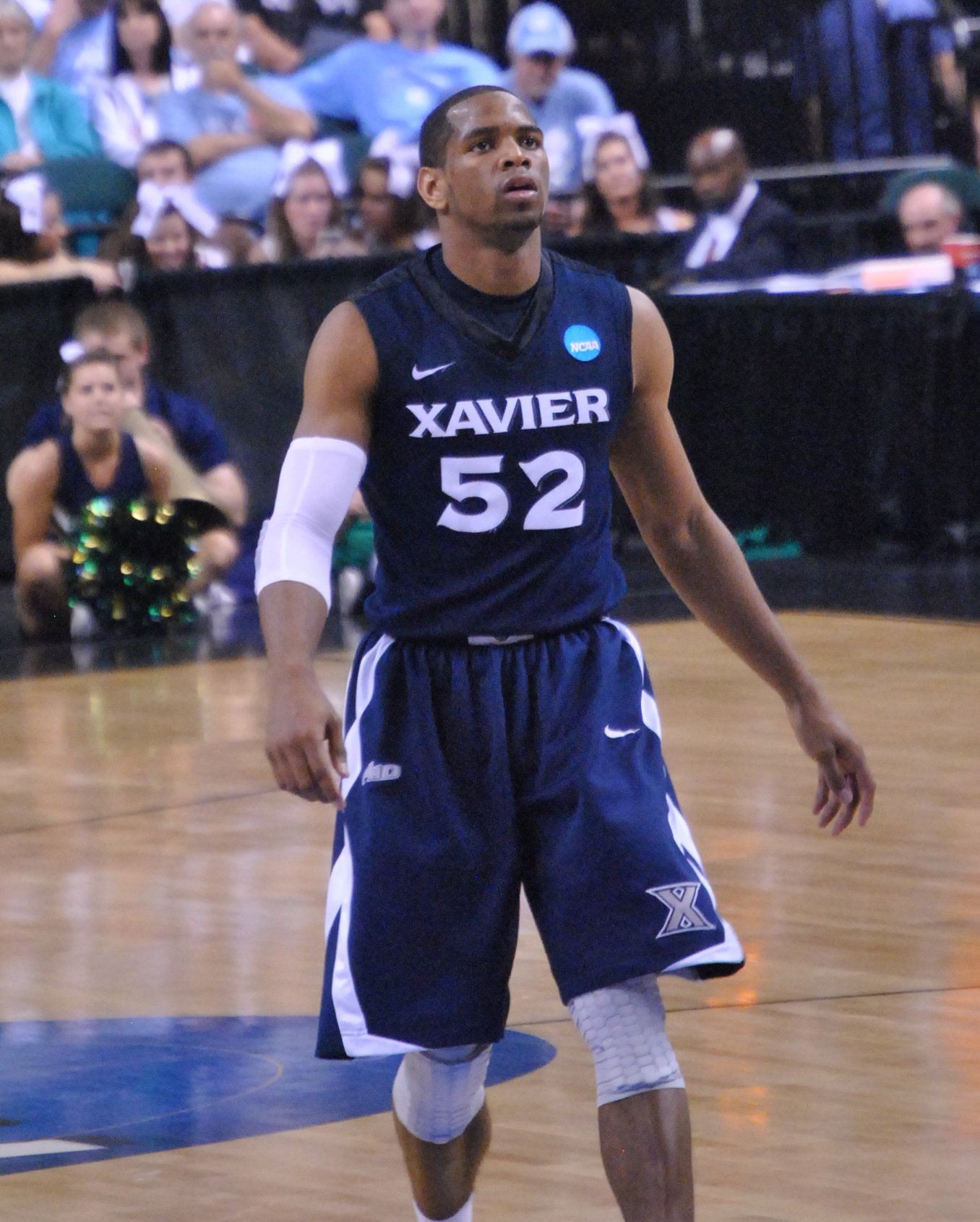
- Holloway playing for Xavier

Personal information
- Born: August 21, 1989 (age 37) Hempstead, New York, U.S.
- Listed height: 6 ft 0 in (1.83 m)
- Listed weight: 187 lb (85 kg)

Career information
- High school: Harmony Community School (Cincinnati, Ohio)
- College: Xavier (2008–2012)
- NBA draft: 2012: undrafted
- Playing career: 2012–2025
- Position: Point guard

Career history
- 2012–2013: Aliağa Petkim
- 2013–2014: Leuven Bears
- 2014: Atléticos de San Germán
- 2014: Guaros de Lara
- 2014–2015: Halcones Rojos Veracruz
- 2015: Guaros de Lara
- 2015: Mets de Guaynabo
- 2015–2016: Texas Legends
- 2016: Guaros de Lara
- 2016–2017: Vanoli Cremona
- 2017: Hapoel Holon
- 2017: Piratas de Quebradillas
- 2017–2018: Hapoel Holon
- 2018–2019: İstanbul BB
- 2019: Incheon ET Land Elephants
- 2019: Piratas de Quebradillas
- 2019–2020: Rytas Vilnius
- 2020–2021: OGM Ormanspor
- 2021: Piratas de Quebradillas
- 2021–2022: Maccabi Rishon LeZion
- 2022: Zamalek
- 2022–2024: Real Estelí
- 2023: Cagrejeros de Santurce
- 2024: Plateros de Fresnillo
- 2024: Brillantes del Zulia
- 2024: Cocodrilos de Caracas
- 2024-2025: London Lions
- 2025: Metros de Santiago

Career highlights
- Israeli Cup winner (2018); BSN Finals MVP (2017); BSN champion (2017); NBA D-League All-Star (2016); Belgian League steals leader (2014); Third-team All-American – AP, SN (2011); Atlantic 10 Player of the Year (2011); 2× First-team All-Atlantic 10 (2011, 2012)
- Stats at Basketball Reference

Terrell "Tu" Holloway (born August 21, 1989) is an American former professional basketball player. As a junior at Xavier, he was selected as the 2011 Atlantic 10 Conference player of the year and was named to several All-America teams in the 2010–11 season.

== High school career ==
Holloway spent three years at Hempstead High School in Hempstead, New York, then transferred to Harmony Prep in Cincinnati. Holloway originally committed to Indiana University, but opted to re-open his commitment following the resignation of coach Kelvin Sampson, eventually choosing Xavier University.

== College career ==
Holloway was a part-time starter as a freshman, then became the starting point guard as a sophomore, playing alongside future NBA player Jordan Crawford. He averaged 12.1 points and 3.9 assists that year and helped the Musketeers to a 26–9 record and a share of the Atlantic 10 title.

Prior to his junior year, Holloway began using the nickname "Tu" exclusively. The name change signalled a breakout year, as Holloway led the conference in assists (5.4 per game) and finished second in the league in scoring (19.7 points per game). He was selected as the 2011 Atlantic 10 Conference men's basketball player of the year as he led the Musketeers to another regular-season championship. Holloway was also the only player in NCAA Division I basketball to record two triple-doubles during the season. Holloway also received national recognition as he was named a third-team All-American by both the Associated Press, Fox Sports, and Sporting News magazine.

In December 2011, Holloway received press for his role during and after the game with rival Cincinnati that ended with a brawl between the teams. In a post-game press conference, Holloway was quoted as saying "We've got a whole bunch of gangsters in the locker room. Not thugs, but tough guys on the court. And we went out there and zipped them up at the end of the game."

Holloway finished his college career at Xavier as second most in assists and the sixth leading points scorer all time.

== Professional career ==
After going undrafted in the 2012 NBA draft, Holloway joined the Toronto Raptors for the 2012 NBA Summer League. On September 25, Holloway signed a contract with the Dallas Mavericks, but on October 2, he was waived by the team. On November 4, he signed with Aliağa Petkim in Turkey.

In June, 2013, Holloway signed with the Leuven Bears of the Basketball League Belgium. On February 16, 2014, Leuven and Holloway reached an mutual agreement to dissolve his contract. Holloway averaged 17.3 points per game in 19 Ethias League games for Leuven.

On June 18, 2015, Holloway signed with Mets de Guaynabo of the Puerto Rican Baloncesto Superior Nacional.

On October 22, 2015, Holloway signed with the Dallas Mavericks, only to be waived by the team two days later. On October 31, he signed with the Texas Legends as an affiliate player. On February 9, 2016, he was named in the West All-Star team for the 2016 NBA D-League All-Star Game as a replacement for Elliot Williams, who left the D-League, after averaging 20.8 points, 3.1 rebounds, 5.9 assists, 1.5 steals and 35.7 minutes in 30 games. On April 1, he was waived by the Legends after sustaining a season-ending injury. On April 8, he returned to Guaros de Lara, making his debut the same day in a win over Gaiteros del Zulia.

On July 20, 2016, Holloway signed with the Italian team Vanoli Cremona. On February 1, 2017, he parted ways with Cremona. Six days later, he signed with Israeli club Hapoel Holon for the rest of the season. On June 29, 2017, he signed with the Piratas de Quebradillas of Puerto Rico for the rest of the 2017 BSN season. On August 11, 2017, Holloway led Piratas de Quebradillas to win the 2017 BSN championship, earning the Finals MVP honors.

On July 21, 2017, Holloway returned to Hapoel Holon for a second stint, signing a one-year deal. On March 17, 2018, Holloway recorded a season-high 28 points, along with 6 rebounds, 5 assists and 3 steals, and led Holon to an 86–81 win over Maccabi Tel Aviv. Three days later, Holloway was named Israeli League Round 20 MVP. Holloway won the 2018 Israeli State Cup with Holon, as well as reaching the 2018 Israeli League Final. In 35 games played during the 2017–18 season, he averaged 15.5 points, 2.4 rebounds, 3.6 assists and 1.3 blocks per game.

On July 28, 2018, Holloway signed with the Turkish team İstanbul BB for the 2018–19 season.

On August 30, 2019, Holloway signed with Rytas Vilnius of the Lithuanian Basketball League. He averaged 7.6 points and 4.3 assists per game.

On June 8, 2020, Holloway signed with OGM Ormanspor of the Turkish league. On January 3, 2021, he had a 22 points, 10 rebounds, and 11 assists performance against Frutti Extra Bursaspor, which marked his first triple double of his career.

On May 20, 2021, Holloway returned to Piratas de Quebradillas.

On October 26, 2021, he signed with Maccabi Rishon LeZion of the Israeli Premier League.
