= Bob Pelkington =

American basketball player

Personal information
- Born: September 6, 1941 Akron, Ohio, U.S.
- Died: January 31, 2016 (aged 74) Fort Wayne, Indiana, U.S.
- Listed height: 6 ft 7 in (2.01 m)
- Listed weight: 250 lb (113 kg)

Career information
- High school: Central Catholic (Fort Wayne, Indiana)
- College: Xavier (1961–1964)
- NBA draft: 1964: 8th round, 65th overall pick
- Drafted by: Philadelphia 76ers
- Position: Center

Career highlights
- NCAA rebounding leader (1964)
- Stats at Basketball Reference

Robert V. Pelkington Sr. (September 6, 1941 – January 31, 2016) was an American basketball player for Xavier University from 1960 to 1964.

Pelkington was one of the best rebounders of his era. During his senior year, he led the nation in rebounds per game at 21.8. His 16.6 career average is still the highest in school history.

He died on January 31, 2016, at the age of 74.
