= John H. Castle High School =

Castle High School

Location
- 3344 Indiana 261; Newburgh, Warrick County, Indiana 47630; United States; 37°59′6″N 87°23′4″W

Information
- Type: Public high school
- Established: 1959
- Locale: Suburban
- School district: Warrick County School Corporation
- Principal: Jim Hood
- Teaching staff: 112.17 (on a FTE basis)
- Grades: 9-12
- Enrollment: 1,953 (2024-2025)
- Student to teacher ratio: 17.41
- Colors: Navy, gold, and white
- Athletics conference: Southern Indiana Athletic Conference
- Nickname: Knights
- Gym Capacity: 3,789
- Website: castle.warrick.k12.in.us

Castle High School, previously known as John H. Castle High School is a public high school located about a mile northeast of Newburgh, Indiana on Indiana 261. Castle is one of three high schools in the Warrick County School Corporation. Until 2020, it was the only non-Evansville school that played in the Southern Indiana Athletic Conference as well as the largest high school in southwestern Indiana by enrollment. Castle High School offers classes in agriculture, art, business and computers, English, family and consumers science, industrial technology, mathematics, music and fine arts, physical education, science, social studies, resource education, and world languages. Castle also offers Advanced Placement classes in English language, English literature, calculus, chemistry, US history, biology, government, macroeconomics, art history, and CS principles.

== History ==
Castle High School was founded in 1959 and later moved in 1975 to its current location on 92 acres (37 ha). In 2004, a new wing was added to the school containing a large band facility, two science labs, and several classrooms. Also associated with this project was a new weight room facility and new locker rooms for the varsity sports. In 2008, Castle began construction on a library, to supplement the existing media center, and also broke ground on the natatorium, containing an Olympic-size pool, both completed by the 2009–2010 school year.

== Facilities ==
Castle High School is on a 92-acre (37 ha) site. The high school has a 6,000-seat football and track stadium. There is also a baseball and softball field, a soccer field, five tennis courts and an Olympic-size pool. The building contains two gymnasiums, the north gym with a capacity of 3500, and the south gym with a capacity of 600.

== Demographics ==
The demographic breakdown of the 1,940 students enrolled in 2014-2015 was:

- Male - 52.3%
- Female - 47.7%
- Native American/Alaskan - 0.3%
- Asian/Pacific islanders - 3.0%
- Black - 1.9%
- Hispanic - 2.5%
- White - 87.7%
- Multiracial - 4.6%

19.6% of the students were eligible for free or reduced lunch.

== Extracurricular activities ==
=== Athletics ===
The Castle Knights are members of the Southern Indiana Athletic Conference. The school colors are blue, white, and gold. The following IHSAA-sanctioned sports are offered:

- Baseball (boys)
- Basketball (boys and girls)
  - Girls state champion - 2006
- Cross country (boys and girls)
- Football (boys)
  - State champion - 1982, 1994
- Golf (boys and girls)
- Soccer (boys and girls)
  - Boys state champion - 2000
- Softball (girls)
  - State champion - 2001
- Swimming (boys and girls)
- Tennis (boys and girls)
- Track (boys and girls)
- Volleyball (girls)
- Unified track (co-ed)
- Wrestling (boys)

Castle also offers the following club sports: archery, bowling and lacrosse (boys and girls).

=== Arts ===
The marching band, known as the Marching Knights, features over 200 members in the wind, percussion, and color guard sections. The marching band placed 2nd in the Indiana State School Music Association State Finals in 2005 and 2017, and performed in the Bands of America Grand National Finals in 2016, 2017, 2022, 2024 and 2026. They were named class AAA national champion in 2017 and 2026. During the 2022 awards, the Marching Knights were invited to the 2024 Rose Bowl Parade. The Marching Knights also received The Sudler Shield in 2016. Castle's top jazz ensemble has performed in the ISSMA State Jazz Finals each year since its inception in 2016 and was deemed the honor band in 2017, 2022, and 2025.

Castle is home to the Knightingales, the basic all-girls show choir, and the Knight Sensations, the advanced mixed show choir.

== Notable alumni ==
- Jamey Carroll, MLB player
- Ernie Haase, gospel singer; founder of Grammy nominated Ernie Haase & Signature Sound
- Marc Horowitz, artist and internet celebrity
- Bryce Hunt, Olympic swimmer who competed in 2004
- Zach Messinger, baseball player
- Jack Nunge (2017), a basketball player for Xavier University
- Michael Rosenbaum, actor known for portraying Lex Luthor on Smallville
- Holli Sullivan, politician and 62nd secretary of state of Indiana
- Isaiah Swope, basketball player

== See also ==
- List of high schools in Indiana
