= Jack Nunge =

American basketball player (born 1999)

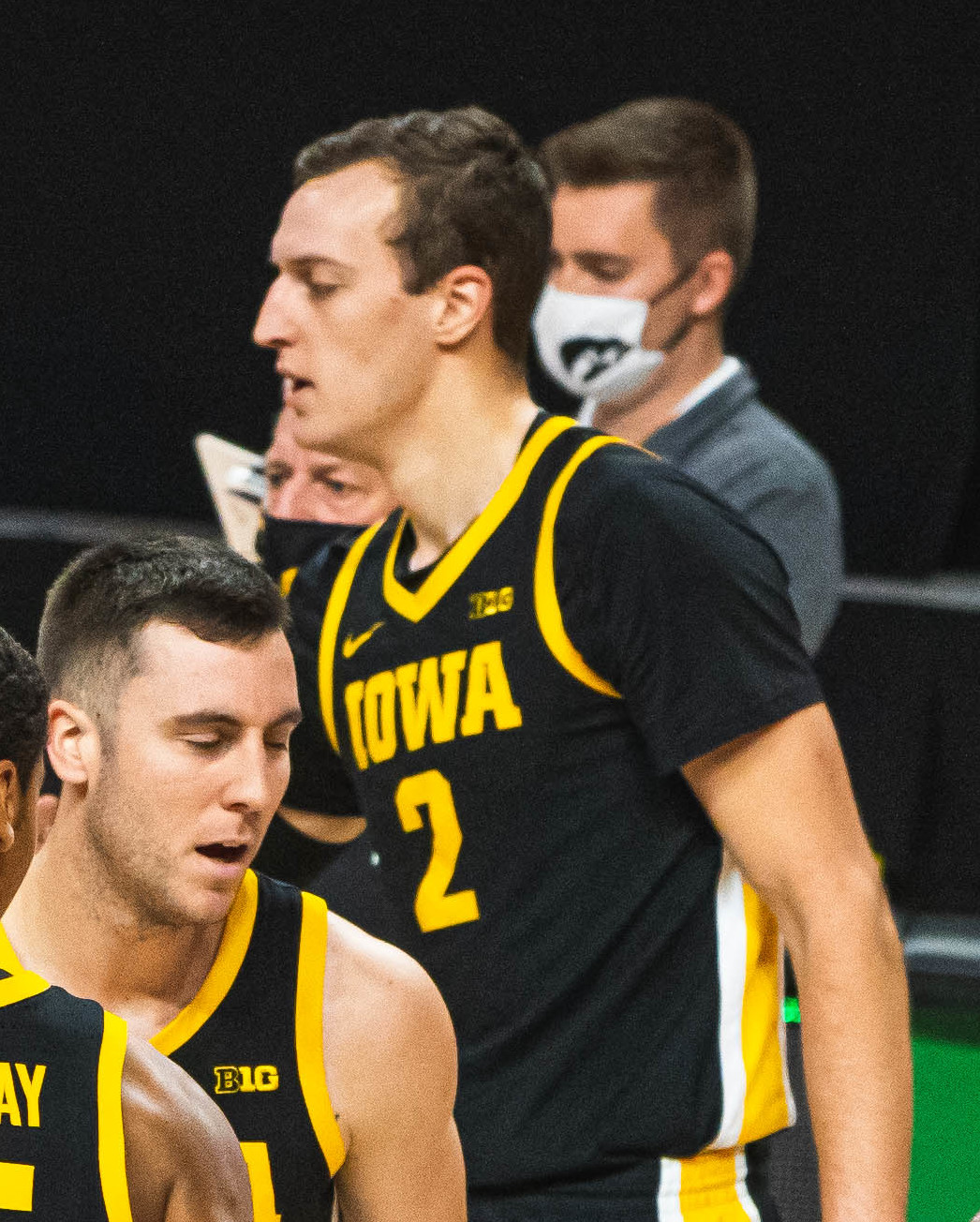
- Nunge in 2021

Fukushima Firebonds
- Position: Power forward
- League: B.League

Personal information
- Born: February 20, 1999 (age 27) Newburgh, Indiana, U.S.
- Listed height: 7 ft 0 in (2.13 m)
- Listed weight: 245 lb (111 kg)

Career information
- High school: Castle (Newburgh, Indiana)
- College: Iowa (2017–2021); Xavier (2021–2023)
- NBA draft: 2023: undrafted
- Playing career: 2023–present

Career history
- 2023–2024: Scafati Basket
- 2024–2025: ESSM Le Portel
- 2025–present: Fukushima Firebonds

Career highlights
- NIT champion (2022)

John Richard Nunge (born February 20, 1999) is an American professional basketball player for Fukushima Firebonds of the B.League.

Nunge played college basketball for the Xavier Musketeers of the Big East Conference. He previously played for the Iowa Hawkeyes.

== High school career ==
Nunge played basketball for Castle High School in Newburgh, Indiana. In his junior season, he averaged 19.3 points, 11.4 rebounds and 3.7 blocks per game. As a senior, Nunge averaged 22.8 points, 11.6 rebounds and 3.5 blocks per game, leading his team to the Class 4A Seymour semistate. He was named Evansville Courier & Press All-Metro Player of the Year. He committed to playing college basketball for Iowa over offers from Clemson, Nebraska, Georgia Tech, Creighton and Vanderbilt, among others.

== College career ==
As a freshman at Iowa, Nunge averaged 5.7 points and 2.8 rebounds per game. He opted to redshirt his next season to gain strength and to develop his skills. In his fifth game as a sophomore, Nunge suffered a torn anterior cruciate ligament in his right knee, forcing him to miss the rest of the season. He averaged 7.1 points and 5.3 rebounds per game as a redshirt sophomore, before sustaining another season-ending right knee injury, a torn meniscus. For his junior year, Nunge transferred to Xavier. On December 11, 2021, he posted a career-high 31 points and 15 rebounds in an 83–63 win against Cincinnati. Nunge was named Honorable Mention All-Big East. In his final season, he averaged 14.2 points, 7.8 rebounds and 1.2 blocked shots per game.

== Professional career ==
On October 1, 2023, Nunge signed his first professional contract with Scafati Basket of the Lega Basket Serie A.

On June 17, 2024, he signed with ESSM Le Portel of the LNB Pro A.

== Career statistics ==
Legend
GP	Games played	GS	Games started	MPG	Minutes per game
FG%	Field goal percentage	3P%	3-point field goal percentage	FT%	Free throw percentage
RPG	Rebounds per game	APG	Assists per game	SPG	Steals per game
BPG	Blocks per game	PPG	Points per game	**Bold**	Career high

=== College ===
Year	Team	GP	GS	MPG	FG%	3P%	FT%	RPG	APG	SPG	BPG	PPG
2017–18	Iowa	33	14	15.7	.443	.333	.755	2.8	1.0	.6	.8	5.7
2018–19	Iowa	Redshirt										
2019–20	Iowa	6	5	14.7	.364	.214	.750	3.8	1.5	.2	.0	5.0
2020–21	Iowa	22	0	15.9	.445	.298	**.829**	5.3	1.3	.3	.9	7.1
2021–22	Xavier	**36**	19	26.5	**.548**	.365	.706	7.4	1.1	.7	**1.4**	13.4
2022–23	Xavier	34	**34**	**29.0**	.511	**.366**	.673	**7.7**	**2.1**	**.9**	1.2	**13.8**
Career		70	53	27.7	.528	.365	.692	7.6	1.6	0.8	1.3	13.6

== Personal life ==
Nunge's father, Mark, was an emergency physician and played basketball for the University of Rochester. On November 21, 2020, Mark died unexpectedly at age 53, causing Nunge to miss the first two games of his sophomore season at Iowa. His mother, Beth, played basketball and softball for Central College. Nunge's sisters have played volleyball at the college level: Rebecca at Notre Dame, and Jessica at Florida State and Illinois. His brother, Bob, also played for Xavier - he was a Junior during the 2023–24 season. His cousin, Chelsea Poppens, played in the Women's National Basketball Association after a college career at Iowa State.
