= Zach Freemantle =

American basketball player (born 2000)

No. 32 – Legia Warsaw
- Position: Power forward / center
- League: PLK

Personal information
- Born: October 18, 2000 (age 25) Teaneck, New Jersey, U.S.
- Listed height: 6 ft 9 in (2.06 m)
- Listed weight: 227 lb (103 kg)

Career information
- High school: Bergen Catholic (Oradell, New Jersey)
- College: Xavier (2019–2025)
- NBA draft: 2025: undrafted
- Playing career: 2025–present

Career history
- 2025–2026: San Diego Clippers
- 2026–present: Legia Warsaw

Career highlights
- NIT champion (2022); Second-team All-Big East (2021, 2025); Big East co-Most Improved Player (2021); Big East All-Freshman Team (2020)
- Stats at NBA.com
- Stats at Basketball Reference

Zachary Vincent Freemantle (born October 18, 2000) is an American basketball player for Legia Warsaw of the Polish Basketball League (PLK). He played college basketball for the Xavier Musketeers.

== Early life ==
Freemantle was born and grew up in Teaneck, New Jersey and attended Bergen Catholic High School. He averaged 18.9 points, 10.3 rebounds, 1.4 blocks, 1.3 assists and 1.3 steals and was named All-Bergen County in his junior season. As a senior, Freemantle averaged 17 points, 10.5 rebounds and two blocks per game as Bergen Catholic won the Non-Public A State Championship and reached the final of the 2019 Tournament of Champions. Freemantle was rated a four-star recruit and committed to playing college basketball for Xavier during the summer before his senior year over offers from Penn State, Pittsburgh, Northwestern, Boston College and St. Joseph's.

== College career ==
As a freshman, Freemantle averaged 7.5 points and 4.3 rebounds per game and was named to the Big East Conference All-Freshman Team after coming off the bench as a key reserve before starting the final 14 games of the season. Freemantle was named a team captain going into his sophomore season. On November 30, 2020, he scored 24 points and grabbed 12 rebounds in a 99–96 overtime win against Eastern Kentucky. Freemantle averaged 16.1 points and 8.9 rebounds per game as a sophomore. He was named to the Second Team All-Big East as well as Big East Co-Most Improved Player alongside Julian Champagnie. Freemantle averaged 10.4 points and 5.8 rebounds per game as a junior. He was suspended in the preseason prior to his senior year. As a senior, Freemantle averaged 15.2 points and 8.1 rebounds per game. He was sidelined with a foot injury on January 28, 2023, and he underwent season-ending surgery in March. Freemantle missed the entire 2023-24 season while recovering from surgery. In his final season, he averaged 16.8 points, 6.8 rebounds, 2.1 assists and 1.1 steals per game, shooting 51.7 percent from the field.

== Professional career ==
After going undrafted in the 2025 NBA draft, Freemantle joined the Orlando Magic for NBA Summer League. On August 29, 2025, he signed an Exhibit 10 deal with the Los Angeles Clippers. Freemantle was waived on September 27 and joined the San Diego Clippers.

On July 27, 2026, he signed with Legia Warsaw of the Polish Basketball League (PLK).

== Career statistics ==
Legend
GP	Games played	GS	Games started	MPG	Minutes per game
FG%	Field goal percentage	3P%	3-point field goal percentage	FT%	Free throw percentage
RPG	Rebounds per game	APG	Assists per game	SPG	Steals per game
BPG	Blocks per game	PPG	Points per game	**Bold**	Career high

=== College ===
Year	Team	GP	GS	MPG	FG%	3P%	FT%	RPG	APG	SPG	BPG	PPG
2019–20	Xavier	**32**	14	20.6	.460	.353	**.789**	4.3	.6	.5	.7	7.5
2020–21	Xavier	21	21	**31.5**	.513	.321	.594	**8.9**	1.4	.7	**.9**	**16.1**
2021–22	Xavier	30	**22**	27.4	.471	.261	.657	5.8	1.3	**.9**	.7	10.4
2022–23	Xavier	22	21	28.6	**.585**	**.636**	.653	8.1	**2.9**	**.9**	.7	15.2
Career		105	78	26.4	.508	.350	.669	6.4	1.4	.7	.7	11.7
