= Stan Kimbrough =

American basketball player (born 1966)

Personal information
- Born: April 24, 1966 (age 59); Tuscaloosa, Alabama, U.S.
- Listed height: 5 ft 11 in (1.80 m)
- Listed weight: 153 lb (69 kg)

Career information
- High school: St. Joseph (Cleveland, Ohio)
- College: UCF (1984–1985); Xavier (1986–1989)
- NBA draft: 1989: undrafted
- Position: Point guard
- Number: 3, 21

Career history
- 1989: Detroit Pistons
- 1989–1991: Grand Rapids Hoops
- 1992: Sacramento Kings
- 1992–1993: Oklahoma City Cavalry
- 1993: Winnipeg Thunder
- 1993: Yakima Sun Kings
- 1993–1994: La Crosse Catbirds
- 1994: Rochester Renegade

Career highlights
- 2× Second-team All-MCC (1988, 1989)
- Stats at NBA.com
- Stats at Basketball Reference

Stanley R. Kimbrough (born April 24, 1966) is an American former professional basketball player.

Born in Tuscaloosa, Alabama, the 5-foot-11-inch (1.80 m), 153-pound (69 kg) point guard attended both the University of Central Florida and Xavier University. Kimbrough amassed 2,103 points in his four years of college. He played 10 games with the Detroit Pistons of the National Basketball Association (NBA) during the 1989–90 season, and in 1990 signed with the Golden State Warriors but was waived a week later, prior to the start of the 1990–91 season. Kimbrough also played three games for the Sacramento Kings in 1992.

In addition to his NBA career, Kimbrough played four seasons in the Continental Basketball Association (CBA) with the Grand Rapids Hoops, Oklahoma City Cavalry, Yakima Sun Kings, La Crosse Catbirds and Rochester Renegade. He averaged 9.7 points and 5.2 assists in 138 career CBA games.

Kimbrough currently runs his own basketball camp for youth, operating out of Cincinnati, Ohio.
