= Xavier Musketeers men's basketball =

Men's basketball team that represents Xavier University

2026–27 Xavier Musketeers men's basketball team
- University: Xavier University
- First season: 1919–20; 107 years ago
- Athletic director: Greg Christopher
- Head coach: Richard Pitino; 2nd season, 14–17 (.452)
- Location: Cincinnati, Ohio
- Arena: Cintas Center (capacity: 10,212)
- NCAA division: Division I
- Conference: Big East
- Nickname: Musketeers
- Colors: Navy blue, white, and gray
- All-time record: 1,647–1,115 (.596)
- NCAA tournament record: 31–30 (.508)

NCAA Division I tournament Elite Eight
- 2004, 2008, 2017
Other NCAA Division I tournament results
Sweet Sixteen	1990, 2004, 2008, 2009, 2010, 2012, 2015, 2017, 2023
Appearances	1961, 1983, 1986, 1987, 1988, 1989, 1990, 1991, 1993, 1995, 1997, 1998, 2001, 2002, 2003, 2004, 2006, 2007, 2008, 2009, 2010, 2011, 2012, 2014, 2015, 2016, 2017, 2018, 2023, 2025

NIT champions
- 1958, 2022

Conference tournament champions
- MCC: 1983, 1986, 1987, 1988, 1989, 1991 A-10: 1998, 2002, 2004, 2006

Conference regular-season champions
- MCC: 1981, 1986, 1988, 1990, 1991, 1993, 1994, 1995 A-10: 1997, 2002, 2003, 2007, 2008, 2009, 2010, 2011 Big East: 2018

Conference division champions
- A-10 West: 1997, 1998

Uniforms
Home	Away	Alternate

The Xavier Musketeers men's basketball team represents Xavier University in Cincinnati, Ohio. The school's team currently competes in the Big East Conference. Xavier has appeared in the NCAA tournament 30 times, 16 times in the 18 tournaments between 2001 and 2018. On March 11, 2018, Xavier earned its first ever No. 1 seed in the NCAA Tournament. Xavier is also a two-time winner of the NIT, with their most recent championship coming in 2022.

Xavier won four Atlantic 10 tournament championships (1998, 2002, 2004 and 2006). Xavier has won or shared 17 regular season conference championships, while winning 9 conference tournament championships. In addition, they have won one Big East Conference regular season title in 2018. They made the 2023 Big East Championship but lost to the Marquette Golden Eagles.

Xavier has been listed among the top-20 most valuable college basketball teams.

== History ==
The first Xavier basketball game on record was February 20, 1920 at the Fenwick Club in Cincinnati. Coached by Joe Meyer, the Musketeers compiled a 94–52 record during Meyer's 13-year run as head coach from 1920 to 1933. The Musketeer's success continued under second head coach Clem Crowe. During Crowe's 10 years as Xavier head coach, Xavier compiled a record of 96–78. Crowe's 96 wins as a head coach rank fourth all-time among Xavier head coaches.

Following the 1942–43 season, play was suspended for the following two seasons because of World War II. In 1945, the program resumed under the leadership of head coach Ed Burns. In his one season as head coach, Burns compiled a record of 3–16.

In 1946, Burns was replaced by Lew Hirt. Under Hirt, the Musketeers first postseason appearance was in the National Association of Intercollegiate Athletics (NAIA) during the 1948 NAIA National Basketball tournament, the national tournament for small colleges. Xavier finished in 4th place, losing to Hamline University in the national third-place game, 58–59. 1948 was the only year Xavier appeared in the NAIA tournament.

In 1951, Hirt was replaced as head coach by Ned Wulk. Wulk guided the Musketeers to National Invitational Tournament appearances in 1956 and 1957. The 1956 appearance marked Xavier's first NIT win, an 84–80 victory over Saint Louis.

After a loss to Bradley in the 1957 NIT, Wulk was replaced as head coach by Jim McCafferty. McCafferty led the Musketeers back to a third straight NIT in 1958. With wins over Niagara, Bradley, St. Bonaventure and Dayton, Xavier captured the NIT. According to most college basketball historians, the NIT was the elite post season tournament until the NCAA overtook it in the early 1960s. That was the first postseason championship won by any Ohio Division I school.

In 1961, McCafferty led Xavier to their first appearance in the NCAA Division I men's basketball tournament. On March 14, 1961, Xavier fell to Morehead State at the Kentucky State Fairgrounds in Louisville, Kentucky.

McCafferty was replaced as head coach in 1963. He would be followed by Don Ruberg (1963–67), George Krajack (1967–71), Dick Campbell (1971–73) and Tay Baker (1973–79).

In 1979, Xavier was one of the charter members of the Midwestern City Conference (nicknamed the MCC or Midwestern City 6, and now known as the Horizon League), which also included Butler, Evansville, Loyola (Chicago), Oklahoma City, and Oral Roberts. That year also marked the hiring of head coach Bob Staak, who compiled an 88–86 record during his six seasons as head coach, including a return to both the NCAA Tournament and NIT.

=== Pete Gillen era ===
1985 once again marked considerable change for the program. In addition to the hiring of head coach Pete Gillen, the Midwestern City Conference altered its name slightly to the Midwestern Collegiate Conference, adding more teams including Detroit, Notre Dame (excluding men's basketball and football), Saint Louis, Marquette and Dayton. The MCC is the predecessor to the present-day Horizon League. Xavier was a member of the MCC from 1979 to 1995 and won eight regular season and six conference tournament championships.

From 1985 to 1994, Gillen compiled a 202–75 record, including the program's first five wins in the NCAA Tournament. The Musketeers advanced to the NCAA Tournament in seven of Gillen's nine years at the helm. In 1990, Xavier beat Kansas State and future Big East colleagues Georgetown to advance to the program's first Sweet Sixteen.

=== Skip Prosser era ===
Skip Prosser was hired in the spring of 1994 to replace departed head coach Pete Gillen. In his seven seasons as head coach, Prosser compiled a 148–65 record with four NCAA tournament appearances. Prosser's 148 wins are third all-time at Xavier. During his time at Xavier, Prosser continued to build on the momentum Gillen had created. Early in his tenure, Prosser added recruits Gary Lumpkin, Darnell Williams, Lenny Brown and James Posey. Those four players provided the core of Prosser's success during his time at Xavier. After missing the NCAA Tournament in both 1999 and 2000, Xavier returned to the tournament in 2001. Following a loss to Notre Dame in the tournament's first round, Prosser accepted the position of head coach at Wake Forest.

=== Thad Matta era ===
Thad Matta left alma mater Butler to replace Skip Prosser as Xavier's head coach in 2001. Hired with only one year of head coaching experience, Matta inherited a talented core of players in David West, Lionel Chalmers, and Romain Sato. During his three years at the helm, Matta compiled a record of 78–23, with three straight NCAA tournament appearances and Xavier's first appearance in the NCAA Tournament Elite Eight. Matta won two Atlantic 10 regular-season championships in his first two years behind the play of National Player of the Year David West. Following Matta's second year, West was drafted in the first round of the 2003 NBA draft by the New Orleans Hornets. With West's departure, seniors Lionel Chalmers, Romain Sato and Anthony Myles became the team's cornerstone for the 2003–04 season. After a 10–9 start, Xavier closed the season by winning 16 of its last 18 games. "The Run", as it became known, left Xavier 3 points shy of making the program's first NCAA Final Four appearance.

=== Sean Miller era ===
The summer following Xavier's first Elite Eight appearance, Matta was offered and accepted the position of head men's basketball coach at Ohio State. Xavier Athletic Director, Dawn Rogers, quickly promoted Xavier Associate Head Coach Sean Miller. From 2004 to 2009, Miller compiled a record of 120–47. Advancing to the NCAA Tournament in four of his five seasons as head coach, Miller led the Musketeers to another Elite Eight appearance in 2008 and a Sweet Sixteen appearance in 2009. During Miller's tenure as head coach, Xavier continued to shed the "mid-major" label and separate itself as one of the country's premier college basketball programs. Miller's NCAA Tournament success, aggressive non-conference scheduling and national recruiting allowed Xavier to be recognized with the likes of Memphis and Gonzaga as one of the premier basketball programs. After turning away interest from many programs, Sean Miller left Xavier to become the head basketball coach at Arizona.

=== Chris Mack era ===
On April 15, 2009, Xavier's Athletic Director named Xavier Assistant Coach Chris Mack as the 17th head basketball coach in the program's history. A Cincinnati native and Xavier graduate, Mack compiled a record of 26–9 in his first year as head coach. Behind the play of 2010 NBA draft pick Jordan Crawford, Xavier advanced to the NCAA Tournament's Sweet Sixteen for a third straight season. Chris Mack, the 2009–10 Basketball Times Rookie Coach of the Year, was the first Xavier head coach to lead the Musketeers to the Sweet Sixteen in his first season at the helm. With a 14–2 record in Atlantic 10 play, Xavier also won a share of their fourth straight conference championship.

Finishing with a 24–8 overall record including a 15–1 record in the A-10, Mack lead the Musketeers to a fifth consecutive A-10 title and another NCAA tournament berth in 2010–11.

In a 2011–12 season filled with highs and lows. The early season was marred by the Crosstown Shootout brawl in their yearly rivalry game against Cincinnati. The Musketeers had reached as high as #8 in the AP Poll before numerous suspensions from the Crosstown Shootout brawl lead to the team losing 5 of their next 6 games. Xavier rebounded from this ugly incident and reached Mack's second Sweet Sixteen.

In 2013, Xavier joined the newly reconstituted Big East Conference following Big East conference realignment. Xavier became one of the new members of the new 10-team Big East with the "Catholic 7" (DePaul, Georgetown, Marquette, Providence, Seton Hall, St. John's, and Villanova) plus Butler and Creighton. Xavier finished their first season in the Big East with a record of 21–13, 10–8 to finish Big East play in a tie for third place. They received a bid to the NCAA tournament, but lost in the First Round (First Four).

The 2014–15 season also saw a return to the Sweet Sixteen for the Musketeers. From 2008 to 2015, Xavier made five Sweet Sixteens, tied for third in the nation with Wisconsin over that span behind only Louisville and Michigan State. The 2015–16 team finished second in the Big East to Villanova, Xavier's highest finish in the Big East, and advanced to the Second Round of the NCAA tournament.

In 2017, Mack led Xavier to a 24–14 season and got the 11th seed in the West and advanced to the Elite Eight by defeating 6th seed Maryland, 3rd seed Florida State, and 2nd seed Arizona. In the Elite Eight they lost to Gonzaga.

Mack's 215 wins concluding the 2017–18 season placed him first in all-time wins in Xavier history.

=== Travis Steele era ===
On March 27, 2018, Mack was named the head coach at the University of Louisville. Four days after Mack left Xavier for Louisville, longtime Xavier assistant coach Travis Steele was named head coach of the Musketeers. Despite success against rival Cincinnati, Steele was criticized for his inability to lead the Musketeers to the NCAA tournament. After missing the tournament for the fourth consecutive year, Steele was fired on March 16, 2022.

=== Second Sean Miller era ===
Only three days after the firing of Travis Steele, Xavier hired former head coach Sean Miller as his replacement. During the period in between Steele's exit and Miller's full installation as head coach Jonas Hayes served as interim. Hayes would lead the Musketeers to their second-ever NIT championship.

In his first season back at Xavier, Miller led the team to a 27–10 record, earning a berth in the NCAA tournament as a no. 3 seed, where they would be eliminated in the Sweet 16 by Texas. The Musketeers struggled in Miller's second year back, posting a 16–18 record, which broke the team's long streak of winning seasons. Xavier would return to national prominence in the 2024–25 season, however, finishing with a 21–10 regular-season record. The team reached the NCAA Tournament as a no. 11 seed, led by the resurgent All-Conference forward Zach Freemantle, who had been injured for the entirety of the previous year. Xavier defeated Texas in the First Four in Dayton, 86–80, before losing in the NCAA first round to no. 6 seed Illinois, 86–73, in Milwaukee.

On March 23, 2025, it was reported that Miller would be leaving Xavier to become the next head coach at the University of Texas. Miller's second departure was met with widespread outrage from Xavier fans, as Miller had previously expressed regret at having left Xavier in 2009.

=== Richard Pitino era ===
On March 26, 2025, Xavier announced that Richard Pitino would become their next head basketball coach.

== Home courts ==
=== Cintas Center ===
Xavier currently plays its home games at the Cintas Center, a 10,212 seat multi-purpose arena that opened in 2000. The Cintas Center is the fifth different home site in program history.

At Cintas Center, Xavier enjoys one of the nation's best home court advantages. As of April 2018 the Musketeers have compiled a 258–41 (an .863 winning percentage) record since moving to its on-campus home in 2000. Xavier enjoyed a 15–0 mark at home during the 2009–10, its only perfect record for a season at Cintas Center. During the 2017–2018 season, the Musketeers set a Cintas Center record with 17 home victories. The building was named the #3 "Toughest Place to Play" on EA Sports' NCAA Basketball '10. In August 2018 the NCAA named it as the 8th toughest home court in college basketball.

Through the 2018–2019 season, Cintas Center has hosted 3,011,308 fans for Xavier home games and the Musketeers have averaged 10,071 fans (better than 98% capacity) per game during that time. The 2017–2018 season marked the highest average attendance in Cintas Center history with an average 10,475 (over 102% capacity) Musketeer fans at each home game.

Season	Record	Pct.	Games	Attendance	Average	Sellouts
2000–01	13–1	.929	14	141,011	10,072	12
2001–02	13–1	.929	14	143,129	10,224	13
2002–03	14–1	.933	15	152,664	10,178	14
2003–04	13–3	.813	16	158,432	9,902	8
2004–05	12–4	.750	16	178,259	9,903	7
2005–06	11–4	.733	15	146,615	9,774	4
2006–07	14–1	.933	15	148,650	9,910	5
2007–08	16–1	.941	17	170,133	10,008	9
2008–09	14–1	.933	15	151,456	10,097	11
2009–10	15–0	1.000	15	151,843	10,123	7
2010–11	14–1	.933	15	151,475	10,098	9
2011–12	13–3	.813	16	162,474	10,155	10
2012–13	11–4	.733	15	146,710	9,781	1
2013–14	15–2	.882	17	168,127	9,890	7
2014–15	13–3	.813	16	159,974	9,998	9
2015–16	15–1	.938	16	164,501	10,281	11
2016–17	12–4	.750	16	164,520	10,282	12
2017–18	17–1	.944	18	188,554	10,475	18
2018–19	13–5	.722	18	180,611	10,034	13
2019–20	12–5	.706	17	175,281	10,311	12
2020–21	11–2	.846	13	5,766	444	N/A
2021–22	16–5	.762	21	189,793	9,038	12
2022–23	15–2	.882	17	174,869	10,286	15
2023–24	11–7	.611	18	185,683	10,316	15
2024–25	15–2	.882	17			
Total	367–64	.852	431	3,760,530	10,049	234

=== Cincinnati Gardens ===
The Musketeers played their final season at Cincinnati Gardens in 1999–2000. Located two miles from the Xavier campus, the Gardens was the home court for the Xavier Musketeers since the 1983–84 season.

The Xavier men's team played all of its regular season games off campus at the Cincinnati Gardens for 17 years, beginning with the 1983–84 season and ending with an NIT game against Marquette in the 1999–2000 season. The only exception was a game against Florida International that was played at Schmidt Fieldhouse on January 9, 1988.

Xavier compiled an impressive 215–25 (.896) record after moving to the Gardens in the 1983–84 season, including 14–1 in its final season.

=== Schmidt Fieldhouse ===
Prior to moving to the Cincinnati Gardens in the 1983–84 season, Xavier called Schmidt Fieldhouse home. Located on the west side of the Xavier Campus, Xavier compiled an impressive 326–129 (.716) record at the Fieldhouse.

Until opening Cintas Center, the men's basketball team had only played one regular season game on campus since early in the 1983–84 season. Xavier scored a school-record point total in a 125–84 win over Florida International on Saturday, January 9, 1988.

=== Other home courts ===
The Musketeers have also used Riverfront Coliseum and the Fenwick Club.

== Postseason ==
=== NCAA tournament results ===
The Musketeers have appeared in the NCAA tournament 30 times. Their combined record is 31–30.

Year	Seed	Round	Opponent	Result
1961		First Round	Morehead State	L 66–71
1983	No. 12	Preliminary Round	No. 12 Alcorn State	L 75–81
1986	No. 12	First Round	No. 5 Alabama	L 80–97
1987	No. 13	First Round; Second Round	No. 4 Missouri; No. 5 Duke	W 70–69; L 60–65
1988	No. 11	First Round	No. 6 Kansas	L 72–85
1989	No. 14	First Round	No. 3 Michigan	L 87–92
1990	No. 6	First Round; Second Round; Sweet Sixteen	No. 11 Kansas State; No. 3 Georgetown; No. 10 Texas	W 87–79; W 74–71; L 89–102
1991	No. 14	First Round; Second Round	No. 3 Nebraska; No. 11 Connecticut	W 89–84; L 50–66
1993	No. 9	First Round; Second Round	No. 8 New Orleans; No. 1 Indiana	W 73–55; L 70–73
1995	No. 11	First Round	No. 6 Georgetown	L 63–68
1997	No. 7	First Round; Second Round	No. 10 Vanderbilt; No. 2 UCLA	W 80–68; L 83–96
1998	No. 6	First Round	No. 11 Washington	L 68–69
2001	No. 11	First Round	No. 6 Notre Dame	L 71–83
2002	No. 7	First Round; Second Round	No. 10 Hawaii; No. 2 Oklahoma	W 70–58; L 65–78
2003	No. 3	First Round; Second Round	No. 14 Troy State; No. 6 Maryland	W 71–59; L 64–77
2004	No. 7	First Round; Second Round; Sweet Sixteen; Elite Eight	No. 10 Louisville; No. 2 Mississippi State; No. 3 Texas; No. 1 Duke	W 80–70; W 89–74; W 79–71; L 63–66
2006	No. 14	First Round	No. 3 Gonzaga	L 75–79
2007	No. 9	First Round; Second Round	No. 8 BYU; No. 1 Ohio State	W 79–77; L 71–78 ^{OT}
2008	No. 3	First Round; Second Round; Sweet Sixteen; Elite Eight	No. 14 Georgia; No. 6 Purdue; No. 7 West Virginia; No. 1 UCLA	W 73–61; W 85–78; W 79–75 ^{OT} L 57–76
2009	No. 4	First Round; Second Round; Sweet Sixteen	No. 13 Portland State; No. 12 Wisconsin; No. 1 Pittsburgh	W 77–59; W 60–49; L 55–60
2010	No. 6	First Round; Second Round; Sweet Sixteen	No. 11 Minnesota; No. 3 Pittsburgh; No. 2 Kansas State	W 65–54; W 71–68; L 96–101 ^{2OT}
2011	No. 6	Second Round	No. 11 Marquette	L 55–66
2012	No. 10	Second Round; Third Round; Sweet Sixteen	No. 7 Notre Dame; No. 15 Lehigh; No. 3 Baylor	W 67–63; W 70–58; L 70–75
2014	No. 12	First Four	No. 12 NC State	L 59–74
2015	No. 6	Second Round; Third Round; Sweet Sixteen	No. 11 Ole Miss; No. 14 Georgia State; No. 2 Arizona	W 76–57; W 75–67; L 60–68
2016	No. 2	First Round; Second Round	No. 15 Weber State; No. 7 Wisconsin	W 71–53; L 63–66
2017	No. 11	First Round; Second Round; Sweet Sixteen; Elite Eight	No. 6 Maryland; No. 3 Florida State; No. 2 Arizona; No. 1 Gonzaga	W 76–65; W 91–66; W 73–71; L 59–83
2018	No. 1	First Round; Second Round	No. 16 Texas Southern; No. 9 Florida State	W 102–83; L 70–75
2023	No. 3	First Round; Second Round; Sweet Sixteen	No. 14 Kennesaw State; No. 11 Pittsburgh; No. 2 Texas	W 72–67; W 84–73; L 71–83
2025	No. 11	First Four; First Round	No. 11 Texas; No. 6 Illinois	W 86–80; L 73–86

*Following the introduction of the "First Four" round in 2011, the Round of 64 and Round of 32 were referred to as the Second Round and Third Round, respectively, from 2011 to 2015. Then from 2016 forward, the Round of 64 and Round of 32 are called the First and Second Rounds, as they were prior to 2011.

=== NCAA Tournament seeding history ===
The NCAA began seeding the tournament with the 1979 edition.

Years	'83	'86	'87	'88	'89	'90	'91	'93	'95	'97	'98	'01	'02	'03	'04	'06	'07	'08	'09	'10	'11	'12	'14	'15	'16	'17	'18	'23	'25
Seeds	12	12	13	11	14	6	14	9	11	7	6	11	7	3	7	14	9	3	4	6	6	10	12	6	2	11	1	3	11

=== NIT results ===
The Musketeers have appeared in the National Invitation Tournament (NIT) ten times. Their combined record is 21–8. They were NIT Champions in 1958 and 2022.

Year	Round	Opponent	Result
1956	First Round; Quarterfinals	Saint Louis; Dayton	W 84–80; L 68–72
1957	First Round; Quarterfinals	Seton Hall; Bradley	W 85–79; L 81–116
1958	First Round; Quarterfinals; Semifinals; Final	Niagara; Bradley; St. Bonaventure; Dayton	W 95–86; W 72–62; W 72–53; W 78–74
1984	First Round; Second Round; Quarterfinals	Ohio State; Nebraska; Michigan	W 60–57; W 58–57; L 62–63
1994	First Round; Second Round; Quarterfinals	Miami (OH); Northwestern; Villanova	W 80–68; W 83–79; L 74–76
1999	First Round; Second Round; Quarterfinals; Semifinals; 3rd Place Game	Toledo; Wake Forest; Princeton; Clemson; Oregon	W 86–84; W 87–76; W 65–58; L 76–79; W 106–75
2000	First Round; Second Round	Marquette; Notre Dame	W 67–63; L 64–76
2019	First Round; Second Round	Toledo; Texas	W 78–64; L 76–78^{OT}
2022	First Round; Second Round; Quarterfinals; Semifinals; Final	Cleveland State; Florida; Vanderbilt; St. Bonaventure; Texas A&M	W 72–68; W 72–56; W 75–73; W 84–77; W 73–72
2024	First Round	Georgia	L 76–78

=== NAIA tournament results ===
The Musketeers have appeared in the NAIA tournament one time. Their record is 3–2.

Year	Round	Opponent	Result
1948	First Round; Second Round; Quarterfinals; Semifinals; 3rd Place Game	Northwestern State; New Britain State; Mankato State; Louisville; Hamline	W 67–43; W 57–35; W 62–50; L 49–56; L 58–59

== Professional players ==
=== Musketeers in the NBA ===
==== Current NBA players ====
Draft Year	Player	Team
2020	Naji Marshall	Dallas Mavericks
2023	Colby Jones	Detroit Pistons

==== All-time players in the NBA Draft ====
The following table shows Xavier players selected in the NBA or ABA draft or appearing on an NBA or ABA roster.

Draft Year	Player	Team	Round	Pick (Overall)
1949	Mal McMullen	Baltimore	6	5 (57)
1952	Gene Smith	Minneapolis	15	1 (104)
1953	Hank Budde	Minneapolis	9	9 (79)
1954	Bob Heim	Baltimore	6	1 (46)
1956	Dave Piontek	Rochester	3	1 (16)
1957	Jim Boothe	Cincinnati	12	1 (80)
1958	Frank Tartaton	Cincinnati	11	2 (74)
1959	Hank Stein	St. Louis	3	7 (21)
1959	Joe Viviano	Cincinnati	10	1 (65)
1962	Jack Thobe	Cincinnati	4	6 (33)
1962	Bill Kirvin	Philadelphia (Note: The Philadelphia Warriors relocated following the 1962 NBA draft and played the 1962–63 season as the San Francisco Warriors.)	8	7 (67)
1962	Frank Pinchback	Cincinnati	11	4 (88)
1964	Bob Pelkington	Philadelphia	8	4 (65)
1964	Joe Geiger	Cincinnati	8	8 (69)
1966	Brian Williams	St. Louis	8	4 (72)
1968	Bob Quick	Baltimore (NBA)	2	4 (18)
1968	Bob Quick	Indiana (ABA)	4	6 (39)
1969	Luther Rackley	Cincinnati (NBA)	3	8 (37)
1969	Luther Rackley	Minnesota (ABA)	1	4 (4)
1973	Bob Fullerton	Buffalo (NBA)	9	3 (140)
1973	Bob Fullerton	San Antonio (ABA)	3 Senior	5 (41)
1973	Conny Warren	Philadelphia (NBA)	12	1 (175)
1973	Conny Warren	Denver (ABA)	9 Supp.	2 (188)
1979	Nick Daniels	Kansas City	7	17 (145)
1983	Tony Hicks	Milwaukee	7	18 (157)
1983	Jon Hanley	Cleveland	10	2 (208)
1984	Vic Fleming	Portland	2	2 (26)
1984	Jeff Jenkins	Seattle	4	13 (83)
1984	John Shimko	Cleveland	9	3 (187)
1984	Dexter Bailey	Denver	10	9 (215)
1989	Stan Kimbrough	Detroit	undrafted	
1990	Tyrone Hill	Golden State	1	11 (11)
1990	Derek Strong	Philadelphia	2	20 (47)
1993	Aaron Williams	Utah	undrafted	
1994	Brian Grant	Sacramento	1	8 (8)
1995	Michael Hawkins	Boston	undrafted	
1995	Larry Sykes	Boston	undrafted	
1998	Torraye Braggs	Utah	2	28 (57)
1999	James Posey	Denver	1	18 (18)
2003	David West	New Orleans	1	18 (18)
2004	Lionel Chalmers	Los Angeles Clippers	2	4 (33)
2004	David Young (Note: Young transferred from Xavier to North Carolina Central after the 2002–03 season.)	Seattle	2	12 (41)
2004	Romain Sato	San Antonio	2	23 (52)
2009	Derrick Brown	Charlotte	2	10 (40)
2010	Jordan Crawford	New Jersey	1	27 (27)
2014	Semaj Christon	Miami	2	25 (55)
2017	Edmond Sumner	New Orleans	2	22 (52)
2018	J. P. Macura	Charlotte	undrafted	
2018	Trevon Bluiett (Note: Bluiett was not selected in the 2018 NBA draft. He appeared in the 2018 NBA Summer League with the New Orleans Pelicans and made the Pelicans' opening-day regular-season roster but did not appear in an NBA regular-season game. He also appeared in the 2021 NBA Summer League with the Cleveland Cavaliers.)	New Orleans	undrafted	
2020	Naji Marshall	New Orleans	undrafted	
2023	Colby Jones	Sacramento	2	5 (34)
Active players
For undrafted players, the team listed is the one with which the player made his NBA debut. The NBA debut of undrafted players may have occurred later than the draft year shown.

=== Musketeers in the NBA G-League ===
Draft Year	Player	Pos.	Team	NBA Affiliate
2025	Zach Freemantle	PF	San Diego Clippers	Clippers
2024	Quincy Olivari	PG	Motor City Cruise	Pistons

=== Musketeers overseas ===
As of March 21, 2024, 24 former Xavier players are currently playing professionally overseas.

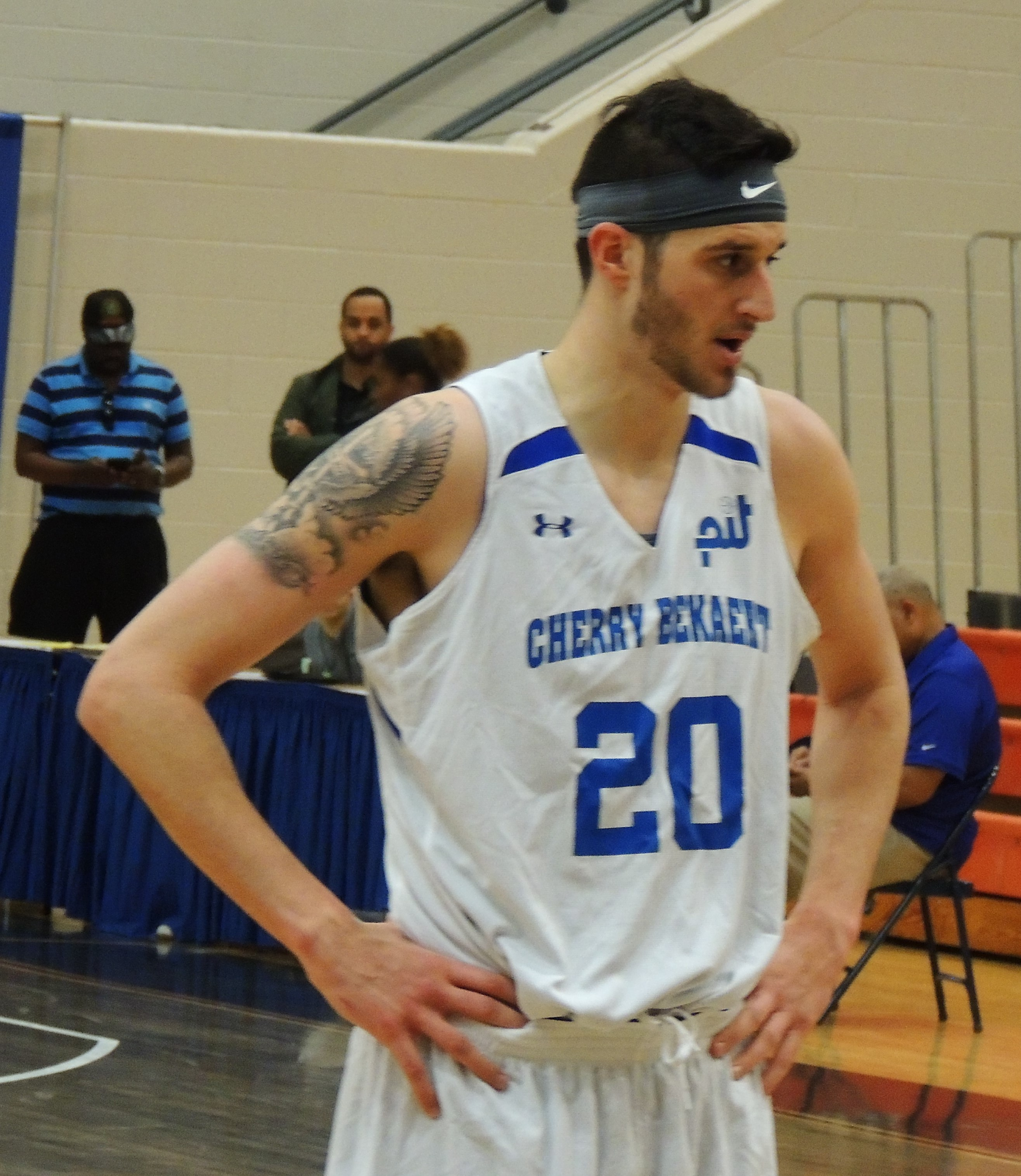
Zach Hankins

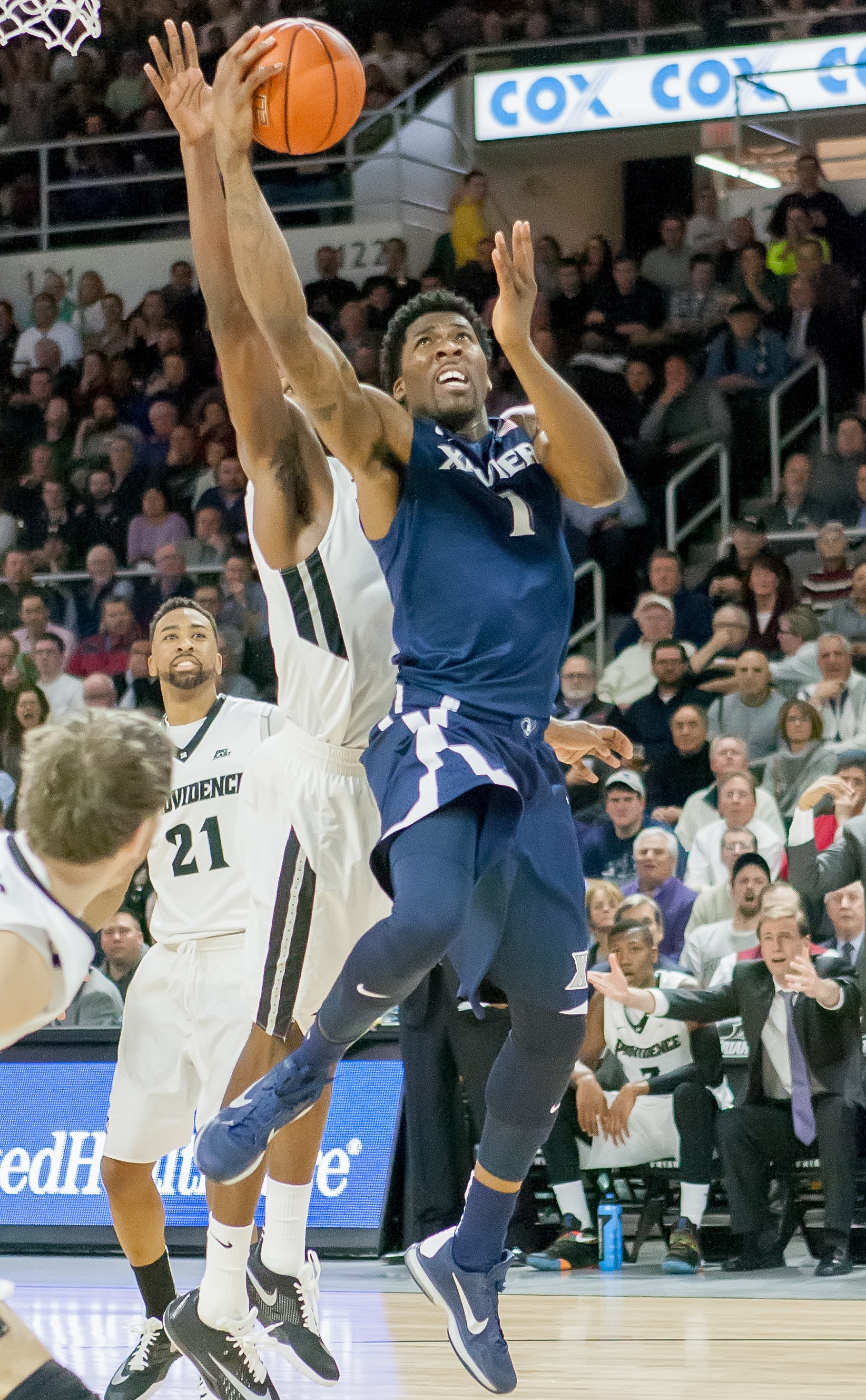
Jalen Reynolds

Last Year at Xavier	Player	Hometown	Country
2025	Jerome Hunter	Columbus, Ohio	(Austria)
2025	Marcus Foster	Atlanta, Georgia	(Germany)
2025	Dayvion McKnight	Shelbyville, Kentucky	(Lithuania)
2025	Dante Maddox	Chicago Heights, Illinois	(Belgium)
2023	Souley Boum	Oakland, California	(Austria)
2023	Adam Kunkel	Erlanger, Kentucky	(Spain)
2023	Jack Nunge	Newburgh, Indiana	(Italy)
2022	Nate Johnson	Hollywood, Florida	(France)
2022	Paul Scruggs	Indianapolis, Indiana	(Poland)
2021	Bryan Griffin	Pomona, New York	(Romania)
2020 (Note: James transferred from Xavier to Jacksonville in 2020, and completed his NCAA eligibility with Howard in 2022.)	Dontarius James	Kershaw, South Carolina	(Georgia (country))
2020	Tyrique Jones	Hartford, Connecticut	(Turkey)
2019	Kyle Castlin	Marietta, Georgia	(Belgium)
2019	Zach Hankins	Charlevoix, Michigan	(Israel)
2019 (Note: Harden transferred from Xavier to Jacksonville State in 2019, and completed his NCAA eligibility with Edward Waters in 2022.)	Elias Harden	East Point, Georgia	(Finland)
2018	Trevon Bluiett	Indianapolis, Indiana	(Italy)
2018	Kerem Kanter	Gemlik, Turkey	(France)
2018	Sean O'Mara	Lisle, Illinois	(Japan)
2017	Malcolm Bernard	Middleburg, Florida	(Slovenia)
2017 (Note: Ekiyor transferred from Xavier to Carleton in 2017.)	Eddie Ekiyor	Ottawa, Canada	(Canada)
2017	Edmond Sumner	Detroit, Michigan	(Lithuania)
2016	Remy Abell	Louisville, Kentucky	(Hungary)
2016 (Note: Austin transferred from Xavier to Vanderbilt in 2016, and completed his NCAA eligibility with Central Michigan in the 2017–18 season.)	Larry Austin	Springfield, Illinois	(United Kingdom)
2016	Jalen Reynolds	Detroit, Michigan	(Russia)
2015	Dee Davis	Bloomington, Indiana	(Iceland)
2014	Semaj Christon	Cincinnati, Ohio	(Italy)
2014 (Note: Martin transferred from Xavier to Southern Methodist in 2014, and completed his NCAA eligibility in 2015)	Justin Martin	Indianapolis, Indiana	(Argentina)
2014	Isaiah Philmore	Bel Air, Maryland	(Hungary)
2013	Travis Taylor	Union, New Jersey	(Cyprus)
2012	Tu Holloway	Hempstead, New York	(Nicaragua)
2012 (Note: Wells transferred from Xavier to Maryland in 2012, and completed his NCAA eligibility in 2015)	Dez Wells	Raleigh, North Carolina	(Israel)

Romain Sato, 2010 Italian League MVP, won two straight Italian League Championships in 2009 and 2010. More recently, Justin Doellman was named ACB MVP in 2014 while with Valencia. Mark Lyons was the top scorer in the Israel Basketball Premier League in both 2015 and 2017. Zach Hankins plays for Hapoel Jerusalem of the Israeli Basketball Premier League.

== Awards ==
=== All-Americans ===
Xavier has a total of 20 players who have won All-American honors during their careers with the program.

- Souley Boum

2022–23: Associated Press Honorable Mention All-American

- Trevon Bluiett

2015–16: USA Today Third Team, Associated Press Honorable Mention
2017–18: Associated Press Second Team, United States Basketball Writers Association Second Team, National Association of Basketball Coaches Second Team, Sporting News Second Team

- Lenny Brown

1996–97: Basketball Weekly Honorable Mention
1998–99: John R. Wooden Finalist

- Semaj Christon

2012–13: Kyle Macy Freshman All-American (collegeinsider.com)

- Jordan Crawford

2009–10: Sporting News Third Team

- Myles Davis

2013–14: Kyle Macy Freshman All-American (collegeinsider.com)

- Jamie Gladden

1992–93: Associated Press Honorable Mention
1989–90: Basketball Times Freshman Fifth Team

- Brian Grant

1990–91: Basketball Times Freshman Seventh Team
1993–94: John R. Wooden Finalist Associated Press Honorable Mention

- Anthony Hicks

1982–83: Sporting News Honorable Mention, Associated Press Honorable Mention

- Tyrone Hill

1988–89: Associated Press Honorable Mention
1989–90: Basketball Times Third Team, Associated Press Honorable Mention

- Tu Holloway

2010–11: Associated Press, Fox Sports, and Sporting News Magazine Third-team All-American

- T.J. Johnson

1994–95 Basketball Weekly Freshman Honorable Mention

- Byron Larkin

1984–85: Basketball Weekly All-Freshman Second Team, Basketball Times All-Freshman Team
1985–86: Associated Press Honorable Mention
1986–87: Sporting News Honorable Mention
1987–88: United Press International Second Team, Scripps Howard Second Team, Associated Press Third Team

- Gary Massa

1977–78: Basketball Weekly All-Freshman Team

- James Posey

1998–99: College Hoops Insider "Top 15", John R. Wooden Finalist

- Bob Quick

1967–68: Associated Press Honorable Mention

- Romain Sato

2003–04: Associated Press Honorable Mention

- Hank Stein

1957–58: Converse Second Team
1958–59: United Press International Third Team

- Edmond Sumner

2015–16: Kyle Macy Freshman All-American (collegeinsider.com)

- Steve Thomas

1963–64: Basketball News First Team, Helms Foundation First Team, AP, United Press International and Sporting News Honorable Mention

- Brian Thornton

2005–06: ESPN the Magazine, COSIDA All American

- David West

2000–01: Associated Press Honorable Mention
2001–02: Associated Press Second Team, United States Basketball Writers Association Second Team, Basketball Times Second Team, FOXSports.com Second Team, National Association of Basketball Coaches Third Team, Sporting News Third Team, Basketball America Third Team, Dick Vitale's "Rolls Royce Super Five", collegeinsider.com All-American, John R. Wooden Finalist
2002–03: Associated Press First Team & AP National Player of the Year, United States Basketball Writers Association First Team & USBWA National Player of the Year, Basketball Times First Team & BT National Player of the Year, National Association of Basketball Coaches First Team, John R. Wooden First Team, ESPN.com First Team, Sporting News First Team, Dick Vitale's "Rolls Royce Super Five", collegeinsider.com All-American & collegeinsider.com National MVP, NABC/Pete Newell Big Man of the Year.

=== Conference Player of the Year ===
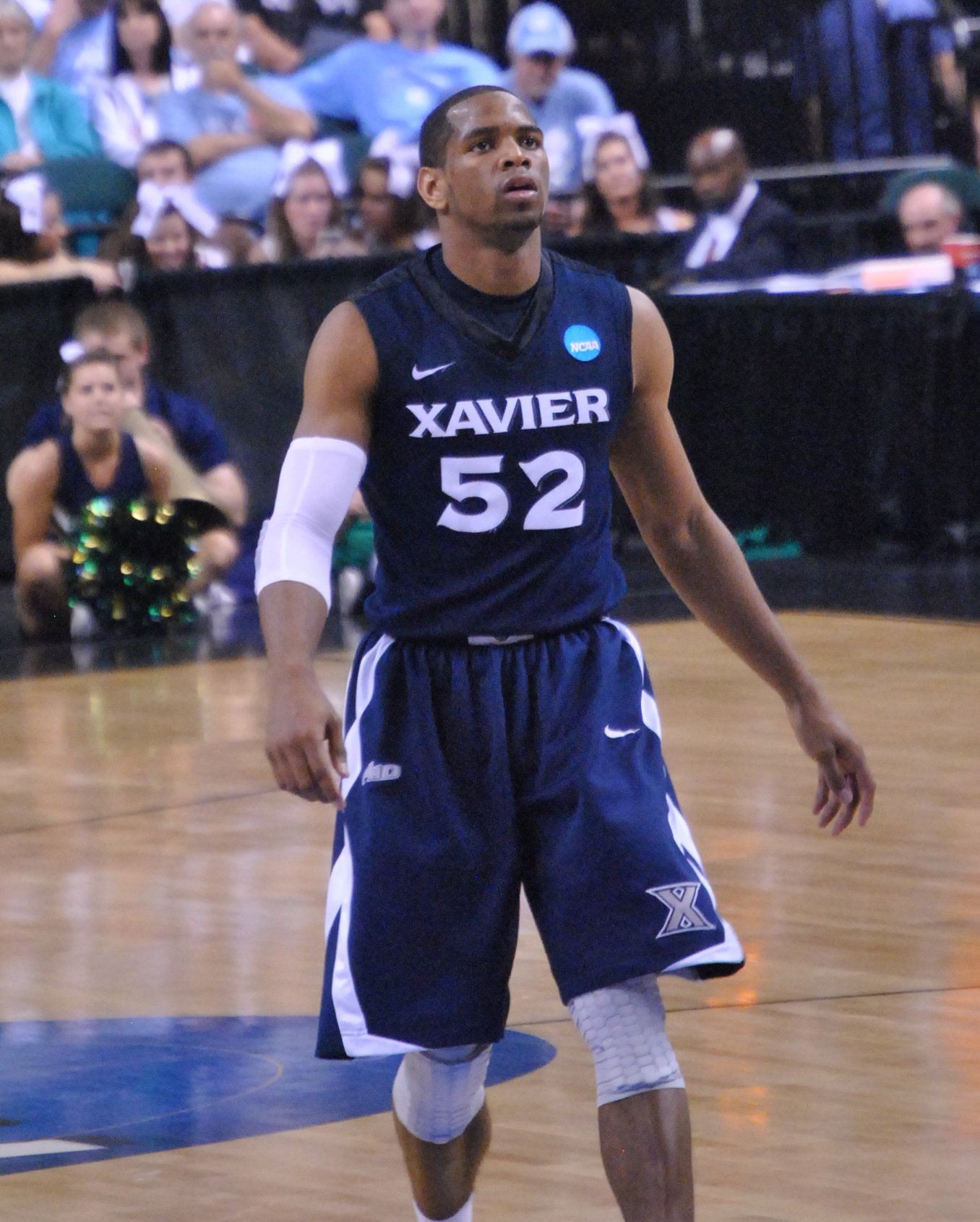
Tu Holloway

Year	Player	Conference
1985–86; 1987–88	Byron Larkin	Midwestern Collegiate Conference
1989–90	Tyrone Hill	Midwestern Collegiate Conference
1992–93; 1993–94	Brian Grant	Midwestern Collegiate Conference
2000–01; 2001–02; 2002–03	David West	Atlantic 10
2010–11	Tu Holloway	Atlantic 10

=== Retired numbers ===
Xavier has retired jersey numbers for seven players in their history.

Xavier Musketeers retired numbers
No.	Player	Pos.	Career	No. ret.	Ref.
5	Trevon Bluiett	SG	2014–2018	2024	
10	Romain Sato	SG	2001–2004	2024	
23	Byron Larkin	SG	1984–1988	1997	
30	David West	PF	1999–2003	2003	
33	Brian Grant	PF / C	1990–1994	2011	
42	Tyrone Hill	PF	1986–1990	1997	
52	Tu Holloway	SG	2008–2012	2024	

Former university President Fr. James Hoff has also had a "jersey" retired in memory of all that he contributed to the school and basketball program. This was unveiled before a 2004 meeting with Creighton, where Hoff was vice president of university relations and President of the Creighton Foundation. Fr. Hoff died from cancer in 2004.

== Coaching history ==
Name (Alma Mater)	Seasons	Games	Wins	Losses	Win %	NCAA Tour	NIT Tour	MCC Tour	A-10 Tour	Big East Tour
Chris Mack (Xavier)	9 (2009–18)	312	215	97	.694	11–8	0–0	0–0	3–4	7–5
Pete Gillen (Fairfield)	9 (1985–94)	277	202	75	.729	5–7	2–1	17–4	0–0	0–0
Sean Miller (Pittsburgh)	8 (2004–09)(2022–2025)	238	185	87	.680	8–6	0–1	0–0	8–4	3–2
Skip Prosser (Merchant Marine Acad.)	7 (1994–01)	213	148	65	.695	1–4	5–2	0–1	6–5	0–0
Cameron Crowe (Notre Dame)	10 (1933–43)	174	96	78	.552	0–0	0–0	0–0	0–0	0–0
Joe Meyer (Xavier)	13 (1920–33)	146	94	52	.618	0–0	0–0	0–0	0–0	0–0
Jim McCafferty (Loyola, La.)	6 (1957–63)	162	91	71	.562	0–1	4–0	0–0	0–0	0–0
Ned Wulk (LaCrosse)	6 (1951–57)	159	89	70	.560	0–0	2–2	0–0	0–0	0–0
Bob Staak (Connecticut)	6 (1979–85)	174	88	86	.506	0–1	2–1	7–5	0–0	0–0
Thad Matta (Butler)	3 (2001–04)	101	78	23	.772	5–3	0–0	0–0	8–1	0–0
Lew Hirt (DePauw)	5 (1946–51)	137	76	61	.555	0–0	0–0	0–0	0–0	0–0
Tay Baker (Cincinnati)	6 (1973–79)	159	70	89	.440	0–0	0–0	0–0	0–0	0–0
Travis Steele (Butler)	4 (2018–22)	120	70	50	.583	0–0	2–1	0–0	0–0	1–4
Don Ruberg (Xavier)	4 (1963–67)	103	52	51	.505	0–0	0–0	0–0	0–0	0–0
George Krajack (Clemson)	4 (1967–71)	103	34	69	.330	0–0	0–0	0–0	0–0	0–0
Dick Campbell (Furman)	2 (1971–73)	52	15	37	.288	0–0	0–0	0–0	0–0	0–0
Jonas Hayes (Georgia)	1 (2022)	4	4	0	1.000	0-0	4-0	0-0	0-0	0-0
Ed Burns (Xavier)	1 (1945–46)	19	3	16	.158	0–0	0–0	0–0	0–0	0–0
Harry Gilligan (Xavier)	1 (1919–20)	1	0	1	.000	0–0	0–0	0–0	0–0	0–0
Richard Pitino (Providence)	1 (2025–present)	0	0	0	–	0–0	0–0	0–0	0–0	0–0

Chart Data

== Basketball and academics ==
=== NCAA academic progress rate ===
In May 2010, the NCAA honored a school-record tying eight Xavier University athletic programs with Public Recognition Awards for academic excellence. The award is given to the top-ten percent of teams in each sport based on the NCAA Academic Progress Rate. The APR is a term-by-term progress for every student-athlete in Division I athletics. Out of the 65 teams to make the 2010 NCAA tournament Xavier had the 11th highest Academic Progress Rate.

=== Graduation ===
Since 1986, Xavier has graduated every men's basketball player that has exhausted his eligibility.

=== Sister Rose Ann Fleming ===
During the 2010 NCAA tournament Xavier's Academic Advisor Sister Rose Ann Fleming garnered considerable national attention for the role she has played in the program's academic success. Fleming was featured in The New York Times, The Wall Street Journal and on both ABC's Good Morning America and NBC Nightly News. Fleming has over 40 years of experience as an educator. She was president of Cincinnati's Summit Country Day School from 1975 to 1976 and president of Trinity College in Washington, D.C. from 1976 to 1982. In addition to the national recognition she received during the 2010 NCAA tournament she has also been featured in Reader's Digest, Woman's Day, was voted one of the Cincinnati Enquirer's Women of the Year, and was the subject of a promotional spot on The Family Channel.

== Rivalries ==
=== Crosstown Shootout ===
Xavier's main rival is the University of Cincinnati. The two schools play annually in the Skyline Chili Crosstown Shootout. Xavier's record in the Shootout is 40–52.

=== Other rivals ===
Xavier and Dayton play for the Blackburn/McCafferty Trophy, named for former coaches at the respective universities. Dayton has not beaten Xavier in Cincinnati since 1981. Dayton maintains a lead in the overall series 85–76. However, Xavier won nine straight games against Dayton between March 1991 and December 1994, and went 24–8 between the 2001–02 and 2015–16 seasons.

Xavier also maintains a heated rivalry with Butler, with the Musketeers leading the overall series, 44–24. Xavier won four of the six games between the teams during the 2020–21 and 2021–22 seasons, sweeping the four regular-season matchups and losing each year to Butler in the Big East tournament.

Between the 2009–10 and 2024–25 seasons, Xavier played Wake Forest eight times in a series known as the Skip Prosser Classic, named for the former coach of both schools. Xavier won five of the eight games played.
