= Tyrone Hill =

American basketball player and coach (born 1968)

Personal information
- Born: March 19, 1968 (age 58) Cincinnati, Ohio, U.S.
- Listed height: 6 ft 9 in (2.06 m)
- Listed weight: 250 lb (113 kg)

Career information
- High school: Withrow (Cincinnati, Ohio)
- College: Xavier (1986–1990)
- NBA draft: 1990: 1st round, 11th overall pick
- Drafted by: Golden State Warriors
- Playing career: 1990–2003
- Position: Power forward
- Number: 32, 42, 40

Career history

Playing
- 1990–1993: Golden State Warriors
- 1993–1997: Cleveland Cavaliers
- 1997–1999: Milwaukee Bucks
- 1999–2001: Philadelphia 76ers
- 2001–2003: Cleveland Cavaliers
- 2003: Philadelphia 76ers
- 2003: Miami Heat

Coaching
- 2009–2013: Atlanta Hawks (assistant)

Career highlights
- As player: NBA All-Star (1995); MCC Player of the Year (1990); 2× First-team All-MCC (1989, 1990); Second-team All-MCC (1988); No. 42 retired by Xavier Musketeers

Career NBA statistics
- Points: 7,532 (9.4 ppg)
- Rebounds: 6,854 (8.6 rpg)
- Assists: 647 (0.8 apg)
- Stats at NBA.com
- Stats at Basketball Reference

Tyrone Hill (born March 19, 1968) is an American former professional basketball player and former assistant coach for the National Basketball Association's Atlanta Hawks. Hill spent four years playing collegiately at Xavier University, in his last season averaging 20.2 points and 12.6 rebounds per game, while shooting 58.1% from the field. The Golden State Warriors selected him with the eleventh pick of the 1990 NBA draft.

After three years in Golden State, Hill was traded to the Cleveland Cavaliers in the summer of 1993. On November 25, 1994, Hill scored 25 points, grabbed 16 rebounds, and recorded seven assists while leading the Cavaliers to a 96–94 win over the Washington Bullets. Playing under Mike Fratello, Hill earned an All-Star Game appearance in 1995. He set Cleveland's single-season franchise record by shooting a career-best 60.0% from the field (and ranked second in the NBA). Hill was sent to the Milwaukee Bucks in a 1997 three-team deal involving notably Terrell Brandon and Shawn Kemp, and after his Bucks tenure spent the remainder of his career between the Philadelphia 76ers, Cleveland (2 stints; 1993–94 to 1996–97 and 2001–02 to 2002–03), and the Miami Heat.

As the starting power forward for Philadelphia, Hill teamed up with Theo Ratliff and later with Dikembe Mutombo with whom he played in the 2001 NBA Finals, losing to the Los Angeles Lakers. He is frequently referred to as the ultimate "lunch pail and hard hat" player, due to his rugged style of play and relentless defense and rebounding prowess.

Hill had a career field-goal shooting percentage of 50.2 and free-throw percentage of 63.

Tyrone also owned a Cincinnati, Ohio-based record company called All Net Records and released various singles and albums by groups including OTR Clique, D'Meka, Renaizzance, and KompoZur.

== NBA career statistics ==
Legend
GP	Games played	GS	Games started	MPG	Minutes per game
FG%	Field goal percentage	3P%	3-point field goal percentage	FT%	Free throw percentage
RPG	Rebounds per game	APG	Assists per game	SPG	Steals per game
BPG	Blocks per game	PPG	Points per game	**Bold**	Career high

=== Regular season ===
Year	Team	GP	GS	MPG	FG%	3P%	FT%	RPG	APG	SPG	BPG	PPG
1990–91	Golden State	74	22	16.1	.492	–	.632	5.2	.3	.4	.4	5.3
1991–92	Golden State	**82**	**75**	23.0	.522	.000	.694	7.2	.6	.9	.5	8.2
1992–93	Golden State	74	66	28.0	.508	.000	.624	10.2	.9	.6	.5	8.6
1993–94	Cleveland	57	20	25.4	.543	.000	.668	8.8	.8	.9	**.6**	10.6
1994–95	Cleveland	70	67	34.2	.504	.000	.662	**10.9**	.8	.8	**.6**	**13.8**
1995–96	Cleveland	44	2	21.1	.512	–	.600	5.5	.8	.7	.5	7.8
1996–97	Cleveland	74	70	34.9	**.600**	.000	.633	9.9	1.2	.9	.4	12.9
1997–98	Milwaukee	57	56	**36.2**	.498	.000	.608	10.7	**1.5**	**1.2**	.5	10.0
1998–99	Milwaukee	17	17	30.4	.424	–	.568	7.9	1.0	1.1	.5	8.6
1998–99	Philadelphia	21	6	28.0	.480	–	.507	7.3	.9	.8	.4	8.5
1999–00	Philadelphia	68	65	31.7	.485	.000	.691	9.2	.8	.9	.4	12.0
2000–01	Philadelphia	76	**75**	31.1	.474	.000	.630	9.0	.6	.5	.4	9.6
2001–02	Cleveland	26	26	31.2	.390	.000	.650	10.5	.9	.7	.5	8.0
2002–03	Cleveland	32	25	26.7	.431	–	.733	8.3	1.0	1.0	**.6**	6.3
2002–03	Philadelphia	24	18	20.7	.404	–	.600	5.2	.4	.6	.3	4.5
2003–04	Miami	5	0	7.6	**.600**	–	**.750**	1.6	.0	.0	.2	1.8
Career		801	610	28.0	.502	.000	.643	8.6	.8	.8	.5	9.4
All-Star		1	0	6.0	1.000	–	–	4.0	.0	–	–	2.0

=== Playoffs ===
Year	Team	GP	GS	MPG	FG%	3P%	FT%	RPG	APG	SPG	BPG	PPG
1991	Golden State	9	0	8.9	.643	.000	.667	2.6	.2	.3	.4	2.4
1992	Golden State	4	1	11.8	.429	–	.000	2.0	.3	.5	.0	1.5
1994	Cleveland	3	3	**41.0**	.407	–	.541	**10.3**	**1.3**	.3	.3	**14.0**
1995	Cleveland	4	4	34.8	.310	.000	.640	5.8	.8	**1.8**	.3	8.5
1996	Cleveland	3	0	17.7	**.750**	–	.778	5.0	.0	.0	.0	8.3
1999	Philadelphia	8	1	24.5	.487	–	.368	7.4	.0	.4	.3	5.6
2000	Philadelphia	10	10	35.2	.460	.000	.705	9.7	.9	.9	.1	12.3
2001	Philadelphia	**23**	**23**	32.3	.409	.000	.679	7.3	.4	.6	**.5**	7.2
2003	Philadelphia	10	0	14.1	.632	–	**1.000**	2.8	.2	.1	.1	2.8
Career		74	42	25.3	.451	.000	.628	6.1	.4	.5	.3	6.6

== See also ==
- List of NCAA Division I men's basketball players with 2000 points and 1000 rebounds
