= Byron Larkin =

American basketball player (born 1965)

Personal information
- Born: December 12, 1965 (age 60) Cincinnati, Ohio, U.S.
- Listed height: 6 ft 3 in (1.91 m)
- Listed weight: 190 lb (86 kg)

Career information
- High school: Moeller (Cincinnati, Ohio)
- College: Xavier (1984–1988)
- NBA draft: 1988: undrafted
- Playing career: 1988–1994
- Position: Shooting guard

Career highlights
- Second-team All-American – UPI (1988); Third-team All-American – AP (1988); 2× MCC Player of the Year (1986, 1988); 3× MCC tournament MVP (1986–1988); No. 23 retired by Xavier Musketeers

Byron K. Larkin (born December 12, 1965) is an American former professional basketball player who had spent six seasons playing professionally abroad, although he is best known for his collegiate career at Xavier University between 1984–85 and 1987–88. A native of Cincinnati, Ohio, Larkin starred at Moeller High School in both football and basketball. Even though he was an All-American in football, Larkin chose to play basketball in college for his hometown's Xavier Musketeers.

== College ==
In just his second collegiate game as a freshman, he scored 13 points in only 19 minutes off the bench to lead his team to a three-point win over Pittsburgh. By his seventh game, his head coach (Bob Staak) began to use him as a starter, which was the first of a since-broken school record 115 consecutive starts. Over the span of Larkin's four-year career, Xavier won three Midwestern Collegiate Conference tournament championships (which he was the MVP of each time), two MCC regular season titles, three NCAA tournament appearances, and Xavier's first-ever NCAA Tournament win in 1988. No other player in MCC (now called the Horizon League) history has been named the Tournament MVP three times.

Larkin graduated in 1988 as the most decorated player in Xavier University history. His 2,696 points are the school record and still rank amongst the all-time NCAA Division I career scoring leaders. He was twice named the MCC Player of the Year, first as a sophomore in 1986 and then as a senior in 1988, and he was the first Xavier player to be named to a postseason All-America team. Larkin was also a three-time First Team All-Conference performer and led the Musketeers in scoring for all four years. Different major national media sources such as Sports Illustrated, The Sporting News, Basketball Weekly and Basketball Times all featured him at various times, and later he became the first player in school history to have his jersey number (#23) formally retired. Larkin was later inducted into Xavier University's Athletics Hall of Fame.

After his junior season in 1986–87, Larkin was named as the first alternate for both guard positions for Team USA's squad that competed in the 1987 Pan American Games, which were held in Indianapolis, Indiana.

== Professional career and later life ==
Despite a lauded career at Xavier University, Larkin was never drafted by any National Basketball Association (NBA) team. He worked out for the Cleveland Cavaliers, Milwaukee Bucks and New Jersey Nets, but due to his size (6 ft 3 in (1.91 m)) and inability to adapt to the NBA three-point line, teams did not show enough interest and he was passed up. After a brief stint with the Cedar Rapids Silver Bullets in the Continental Basketball Association, Larkin spent the next five years playing professionally in Venezuela for Guaiqueríes de Nueva Esparta, where in two of them he led his league in scoring. He then split his sixth and final professional season between teams in Germany and Hong Kong. Discussing his expatriate basketball experience, Larkin said, "I loved playing abroad. I would have preferred to play in the NBA, obviously, but I guess the knock on me was I was a little small for my position as a 6-foot-3 two guard. I was told I needed to change and play point guard to make it in the league, and I'm not a point. I'm a two guard. I was OK being a point guard, but I really stood out being a two guard...I didn't put my best foot forward trying to make it in the NBA. But playing overseas, I led Venezuela in scoring two of the five years I was there and won a lot of games. Even the owner of my team came back for my wedding (in Cincinnati) and wanted me to be a naturalized citizen, but five years was enough for me."

Today, Larkin serves as the color commentator for the Xavier men's basketball team's radio broadcasts. He is a financial adviser by day, a job which he has been doing since 1992. He was enshrined in the Ohio Basketball Hall of Fame in April 2022 as part of the 2021 induction class.

== Personal life ==
Byron Larkin is the brother of Hall of Fame baseball player Barry Larkin, who played the shortstop position for the Cincinnati Reds. He is also the brother of Stephen Larkin, another former Major League Baseball player, and the uncle of Shane Larkin, a professional basketball player. The Larkin brothers were all raised Catholic.
