= 2023–24 Big East Conference men's basketball season =

- League: NCAA Division I
- Sport: Basketball
- Teams: 11
- TV partner(s): Fox, FS1, CBS, CBSSN

Regular Season
- Season champions: UConn
- Season MVP: Devin Carter

Tournament
- Champions: UConn
- Runners-up: Marquette

Basketball seasons
- ← 2022–23 2024–25 →

2023–24 Big East men's basketball standings
	Conf.				Overall
Team	W		L	PCT	W		L	PCT
No. 1 UConn †	18	–	2	.900	37	–	3	.925
No. 13 Creighton	14	–	6	.700	25	–	10	.714
No. 12 Marquette	14	–	6	.700	27	–	10	.730
Seton Hall	13	–	7	.650	25	–	12	.676
St. John's	11	–	9	.550	20	–	13	.606
Villanova	10	–	10	.500	18	–	16	.529
Providence	10	–	10	.500	21	–	14	.600
Butler	9	–	11	.450	18	–	15	.545
Xavier	9	–	11	.450	16	–	18	.471
Georgetown	2	–	18	.100	9	–	23	.281
DePaul	0	–	20	.000	3	–	29	.094
† 2024 Big East tournament winner Rankings from AP Poll

The 2023–24 Big East men's basketball season began with practices in October 2023, followed by the start of the 2023–24 NCAA Division I men's basketball season in November 2023. Conference play began in December 2023 and ended in March. The conference champions were the 2023-24 UConn Huskies men's basketball team and the season MVP was Devin Carter.

== Head coaches ==
=== Coaching changes ===
==== Providence ====
On March 20, 2023, Ed Cooley left Providence to become the new head coach of the Georgetown Hoyas men's basketball team. On March 23, 2023, Kim English was named the head coach of the Friars.

==== Georgetown ====
On March 9, 2023, Patrick Ewing was fired as the coach of the Georgetown men's basketball team after six years with the team. On March 20, 2023, Ed Cooley was named the new head coach of the Georgetown Hoyas men's basketball team.

==== St. John's ====
St. John's fired men's basketball coach Mike Anderson on March 10, 2023, after his fourth season. On March 20, 2023, Rick Pitino was named the head coach of the team.

=== Coaches ===
Team	Head coach	Previous job	Years at school	Overall record	Big East record	Big East titles	NCAA Tournaments	NCAA Final Fours	NCAA Championships
Butler	Thad Matta	Ohio State	2	32–32	13–25	0	0	0	0
UConn	Dan Hurley	Rhode Island	6	100–29	55–41	1	3	1	1
Creighton	Greg McDermott	Iowa State	13	242–129	123–82	0	8	0	0
DePaul	Chris Holtmann	Ohio State	1			0	0	0	0
Georgetown	Ed Cooley	Providence	1	9–22	2–17	0	0	0	0
Marquette	Shaka Smart	Texas	3	73–29	42–17	1	2	0	0
Providence	Kim English	George Mason	1	21–13	10–10	0	0	0	0
Seton Hall	Shaheen Holloway	St. Peter's	2	36–28	22–17	0	0	0	0
St. John's	Rick Pitino	Iona	1	20–13	11–9	0	0	0	0
Villanova	Kyle Neptune	Fordham	2	35–32	20–20	0	0	0	0
Xavier	Sean Miller	Arizona	2	43–27	24–16	0	0	0	0

Notes:

- Years at school includes 2020–21 season.
- Overall and Big East records are from time at current school and are through week nine of the 2019–20 season.
- McDermott's MVC conference records, Matta's MCC records, Miller's A-10 records, Hurley's AAC records not included since team began play in the Big East.

== Preseason ==
=== Preseason Big East poll ===
Prior to the conference's annual media day, conference standings were projected by panel of writers.

Rank	Team
1	Marquette (7)
2	Creighton (4)
3	UConn
4	Villanova
5	St. John's
6	Xavier
7	Providence
8	Georgetown
9	Seton Hall
10	Butler
11	DePaul
(first place votes)

=== Preseason All-Big East ===
A select media panel named a preseason All-Big East team and player of the year.

Honor	Recipient
Preseason Player of the Year	Tyler Kolek, Marquette
Preseason All-Big East First Team	Trey Alexander, Creighton
Preseason All-Big East First Team	Ryan Kalkbrenner, Creighton
Preseason All-Big East First Team	Bryce Hopkins, Providence
Preseason All-Big East First Team	Joel Soriano, St. John's,
Preseason All-Big East First Team	Justin Moore, Villanova
Preseason All-Big East Second Team	Donovan Clingan, UConn
Preseason All-Big East Second Team	Baylor Scheierman, Creighton
Preseason All-Big East Second Team	Oso Ighodaro, Marquette
Preseason All-Big East Second Team	Kam Jones, Marquette
Preseason All-Big East Second Team	Eric Dixon, Villanova

=== Preseason All-American teams ===
Player	AP
Tyler Kolek	1st

=== Preseason watchlists ===
Below is a table of notable preseason watch lists.

Player	Wooden	Naismith	Naismith DPOY	Robertson	Cousy	West	Erving	Malone	Abdul-Jabbar
Trey Alexander, Creighton	✓	✓				✓			
Steven Ashworth, Creighton					✓				
Stephon Castle, UConn						✓			
Donovan Clingan, UConn	✓	✓							✓
Jordan Dingle, St. John's						✓			
Bryce Hopkins, Providence	✓	✓							
Oso Ighodaro, Marquette								✓	
Kam Jones, Marquette	✓	✓				✓			
Ryan Kalkbrenner, Creighton	✓	✓							✓
Alex Karaban, UConn								✓	
Tyler Kolek, Marquette	✓	✓			✓				
Justin Moore, Villanova	✓	✓				✓			
Tristen Newton, UConn	✓				✓				
Baylor Scheierman, Creighton	✓						✓		
Joel Soriano, St. John's	✓								✓

== Regular season ==
=== Rankings ===
Legend
	Improvement in ranking
	Drop in ranking
	Not ranked previous week
RV	Received votes but were not ranked in Top 25 of poll
(Italics)	Number of first place votes

		Pre/ Wk 1	Wk 2	Wk 3	Wk 4	Wk 5	Wk 6	Wk 7	Wk 8	Wk 9	Wk 10	Wk 11	Wk 12	Wk 13	Wk 14	Wk 15	Wk 16	Wk 17	Wk 18	Wk 19	Wk 20	Final
Butler	AP																					*
Butler	C																					
UConn	AP	6 (2)	5 (1)	5 (1)	4 (2)	5	5	5	5	4	4	1 (39)	1 (44)	1 (48)	1 (45)	1 (45)	1 (62)	3 (5)	2 (6)	2 (6)	1 (61)	*
UConn	C	5 (1)	4	4	4	5	5	5	5	4	4	1 (20)	1 (24)	1 (23)	1 (25)	1 (24)	1 (32)	2 (3)	2 (3)	2	1 (32)	
Creighton	AP	8	8	8	15	10	8	12	22	RV	22	18	17	13	19	17	15	12	10	8	11	*
Creighton	C	8	7	7	14	11	8	14	20	RV	20	15	16	13	18	16	15	12	10	6	11	
DePaul	AP																					*
DePaul	C																					
Georgetown	AP																					*
Georgetown	C																					
Marquette	AP	5	4	4	3	8	7	6	10	7	11т	17	14	9	7	4	7	5	8	10	8	*
Marquette	C	7	5	5	3	7	7	6	8	7	12	18	15	10	7	4	8	5	9	10	8	
Providence	AP					RV	RV	RV	25	23	RV											*
Providence	C								25	23	RV											
Seton Hall	AP											RV	RV									*
Seton Hall	C											RV	RV					RV				
St. John's	AP																					*
St. John's	C																					
Villanova	AP	22	21	RV	18	RV			RV	RV		RV							RV			*
Villanova	C	20	21	RV	15	RV			RV	RV	RV	RV										
Xavier	AP	RV																				*
Xavier	C	RV																				

* AP does not release a post-tournament poll.

=== Early season tournaments ===
All 11 Big East teams participated in early season tournaments. Eight teams participated in the Gavitt Tipoff Games.

Team	Tournament	Finish
Butler	ESPN Events Invitational	5th
Creighton	Hall of Fame Classic	2nd
DePaul	Arizona Tip-Off	4th
Georgetown	Georgetown MTE	1st
Marquette	Maui Invitational	2nd
Providence	Baha Mar Hoops Bahamas Championship	3rd
Seton Hall	Rady Children's Invitational	4th
St. John's	Charleston Classic	3rd
UConn	Empire Classic	1st
Villanova	Battle 4 Atlantis	1st
Xavier	Continental Tire Main Event	3rd

=== Players of the week ===
Throughout the conference regular season, the Big East offices named one or two players of the week and one or two freshmen of the week each Monday.

Week	Player of the week	Freshman of the week
November 13, 2023	Kam Jones, Marquette	Stephon Castle, UConn
November 20, 2023	Trey Alexander, Creighton	Isaiah Coleman, Seton Hall
November 27, 2023	Eric Dixon, Villanova	Lazar Djokovic, Xavier
December 4, 2023	Baylor Scheierman, Creighton	Isaiah Coleman, Seton Hall (2)
December 11, 2023	Tyler Kolek, Marquette	Solomon Ball, UConn
December 18, 2023	Al-Amir Dawes, Seton Hall	Rowan Brumbaugh, Georgetown
December 27, 2023	Devin Carter, Providence	Stephon Castle, UConn (2)
January 8, 2024	Kadary Richmond, Seton Hall	Stephon Castle, UConn (3)
January 15, 2024	Kadary Richmond, Seton Hall (2)	Stephon Castle, UConn (4)
January 22, 2024	Tristen Newton, UConn	Rich Barron, Providence
January 29, 2024	Trey Alexander, Creighton (2)	Stephon Castle, UConn (5)
February 5, 2024	Quincy Olivari, Xavier	Stephon Castle, UConn (6)
February 12, 2024	Tyler Kolek, Marquette (2)	Stephon Castle, UConn (7)
February 19, 2024	Devin Carter, Providence (2)	Stephon Castle, UConn (8)
February 26, 2024	Kam Jones, Marquette (2)	Stephon Castle, UConn (9)
March 4, 2024	Baylor Scheierman, Creighton (2)	Stephon Castle, UConn (10)
March 10, 2024	Dre Davis, Seton Hall	Stephon Castle, UConn (11)

=== Conference matrix ===
This table summarizes the head-to-head results between teams in conference play. Each team is scheduled to play 20 conference games with at least one game against each opponent.

	Butler	UConn	Creighton	DePaul	Georgetown	Marquette	Providence	Seton Hall	St. John's	Villanova	Xavier
vs. Butler	–	2–0	1–1	0–2	0–2	1–1	1–1	2–0	2–0	1–1	1–1
vs. UConn	0–2	–	1–1	0–2	0–2	0–2	0–2	1–1	0–2	0–2	0–2
vs. Creighton	1–1	1–1	–	0–2	0–2	1–1	1–1	0–2	1–1	1–1	0–2
vs. DePaul	2–0	2–0	2–0	–	2–0	2–0	2–0	2–0	2–0	2–0	2–0
vs. Georgetown	2–0	2–0	2–0	0–2	–	2–0	2–0	2–0	2–0	2–0	2–0
vs. Marquette	1–1	2–0	1–1	0–2	0–2	–	1–1	1–1	0–2	0–2	0–2
vs. Providence	1–1	2–0	1–1	0–2	0–2	1–1	–	1–1	1–1	2–0	1–1
vs. Seton Hall	0–2	1–1	2–0	1–1	0–2	1–1	1–1	–	0–2	1–1	1–1
vs. St. John's	0–2	2–0	1–1	0–2	0–2	2–0	1–1	2–0	–	0–2	1–1
vs. Villanova	1–1	2–0	1–1	0–2	0–2	2–0	0–2	1–1	2–0	–	1–1
vs. Xavier	1–1	2–0	2–0	0–2	0–2	2–0	1–1	1–1	1–1	1–1	–
Total	9–11	18-2	14–6	0–20	2–18	14–6	10–10	13–7	11–9	10–10	9–11

== Honors and awards ==
=== All-Big East awards and teams ===
On March 13, 2024, the Big East announced most of its conference awards.

=== Big East Awards ===
2024 Big East Men's Basketball Individual Awards
Award	Recipient(s)
Player of the Year	Devin Carter, Providence
Coach of the Year	Dan Hurley, UConn
Defensive Player of the Year	Ryan Kalkbrenner, Creighton
Freshman of the Year	Stephon Castle, UConn
Most Improved Player of the Year	Desmond Claude, Xavier
Sixth Man Award	Hassan Diarra, UConn

2024 Big East Men's Basketball All-Conference Teams
First Team	Second Team	Honorable Mention	All-Freshman Team
Tristen Newton† – UConn; Cam Spencer - UConn; Baylor Scheierman† – Creighton; Tyler Kolek† – Marquette; Devin Carter† – Providence; Kadary Richmond – Seton Hall	Trey Alexander – Creighton; Ryan Kalkbrenner – Creighton; Oso Ighodaro – Marquette; Daniss Jenkins – St. Johns; Eric Dixon – Villanova	Donovan Clingan - UConn; Josh Oduro - Providence; Quincy Olivari – Xavier	Finley Bizjack – Butler; Stephon Castle† – UConn; Rich Barron – Providence; Isaiah Coleman – Seton Hall; Trey Green – Xavier; Dailyn Swain – Xavier
† - denotes unanimous selection

== Postseason ==
=== Big East tournament ===
First round Wednesday, March 13; FS1
8	Butler	72
9	Xavier	76
7	Providence	74
10	Georgetown	56
6	Villanova	58
11	DePaul	57

Quarterfinals; Thursday, March 14; FS1
1	#2 UConn	87
9	Xavier	60
4	Seton Hall	72
5	St. John's	91
2	#8 Creighton	73
7	Providence	78
3	#10 Marquette	71*
6	Villanova	65

Semifinals; Friday, March 15; FOX/FS1
1	#2 UConn	95
5	St. John's	90
7	Providence	68
3	#10 Marquette	79

Championship; Saturday, March 16; FOX
1	#2 UConn	73
3	#10 Marquette	57

* denotes overtime period

=== NCAA Tournament ===
The winner of the Big East Tournament will receive the conference's automatic bid to the NCAA tournament.

Seed	Region	School	First round	Second round	Sweet Sixteen	Elite Eight	Final Four	Championship
1	East	UConn	Defeated (16) Stetson, 91–52	Defeated (9) Northwestern, 75–58	Defeated (5) San Diego State, 82–52	Defeated (3) Illinois, 77–52	Defeated (W4) Alabama, 86–72	Defeated (MW1) Purdue, 75-60
2	South	Marquette	Defeated (15) Western Kentucky, 87–69	Defeated (10) Colorado, 81–77	Lost to (11) NC State, 58–67	DNP		
3	Midwest	Creighton	Defeated (14) Longwood, 77–60	Defeated (11) Oregon, 86–73 (2OT)	Lost to (2) Tennessee, 75–82	DNP		
		W–L (%):	3–0 (1.000)	3–0 (1.000)	1–2 (.333)	1–0 (1.000)	1–0 (1.000)	1–0 (1.000) Total: 10–2 (.833)

=== National Invitation Tournament ===
The following Big East teams will receive invitations to the National Invitation Tournament.

Seed	School	First round	Second round	Quarterfinals	Semifinals	Finals
1	Seton Hall	Defeated Saint Joseph's, 75–72 (OT)	Defeated North Texas, 72–58	Defeated UNLV, 91–68	Defeated (4) Georgia, 84–67	Defeated (1) Indiana State, 79–77
1	Villanova	Lost to VCU, 61–70	DNP			
3	Providence	Lost to Boston College, 57–62	DNP			
4	Butler	Lost to Minnesota, 72–73	DNP			
–	Xavier	Lost to (4) Georgia, 76–78	DNP			
	W–L (%):	1–4 (.200)	1–0 (1.000)	1–0 (1.000)	1–0 (1.000)	1–0 (1.000) Total: 5–4 (.556)
