= 2023–24 Creighton Bluejays men's basketball team =

Basketball team in 2023–24

2023–24 Creighton Bluejays men's basketball

NCAA tournament, Sweet Sixteen
- Conference: Big East Conference

Ranking
- Coaches: No. 11
- AP: No. 13
- Record: 25–10 (14–6 Big East)
- Head coach: Greg McDermott (14th season)
- Assistant coaches: Ryan Miller (3rd season); Jalen Courtney-Williams (3rd season); Derek Kellogg (1st season)
- Home arena: CHI Health Center Omaha

2023–24 Big East men's basketball standings
	Conf.				Overall
Team	W		L	PCT	W		L	PCT
No. 1 UConn †	18	–	2	.900	37	–	3	.925
No. 13 Creighton	14	–	6	.700	25	–	10	.714
No. 12 Marquette	14	–	6	.700	27	–	10	.730
Seton Hall	13	–	7	.650	25	–	12	.676
St. John's	11	–	9	.550	20	–	13	.606
Villanova	10	–	10	.500	18	–	16	.529
Providence	10	–	10	.500	21	–	14	.600
Butler	9	–	11	.450	18	–	15	.545
Xavier	9	–	11	.450	16	–	18	.471
Georgetown	2	–	18	.100	9	–	23	.281
DePaul	0	–	20	.000	3	–	29	.094
† 2024 Big East tournament winner Rankings from AP Poll

The 2023–24 Creighton Bluejays men's basketball team represented Creighton University in the 2023–24 NCAA Division I men's basketball season. The Bluejays, coached by 14th-year head coach Greg McDermott, played their home games at the CHI Health Center Omaha in Omaha, Nebraska as members of the Big East Conference.

In the 2024 NCAA Division I men's basketball tournament, the Bluejays won their first round matchup against Akron before following with another victory over Oregon in the round of 32. However, their season would end in the Sweet 16 to Tennessee, a team led by National Player of the Year Dalton Knecht.

The Creighton Bluejays men's basketball team drew an average home attendance of 17,269 in 16 games in 2023-24.

== Previous season ==
The Bluejays finished the 2022–23 season 24–13, 14–6 in Big East play to finish in third place. As the No. 3 seed in the Big East tournament, they defeated Villanova before losing to Xavier in the semifinals. They received an at-large bid to the NCAA tournament as the No. 6 seed in the South Region, where they defeated NC State, Baylor, and Princeton to reach the Elite Eight for the first time since 1941. There they lost to San Diego State.

== Offseason ==
=== Departures ===
Name	Number	Pos.	Height	Weight	Year	Hometown	Reason for departure
Ben Shtolzberg	1	G	6'4"	200	Sophomore	Northridge, CA	Transferred to UCSB
Ryan Nembhard	2	G	6'0"	170	Junior	Aurora, ON	Transferred to Gonzaga
Shereef Mitchell	4	G	6'1"	170	Senior	Omaha, NE	Transferred to Ohio
John Christofilis	15	G	6'3"	195	Junior	Seattle, WA	Transferred to Seattle
Arthur Kaluma	15	F	6'8"	195	Junior	Glendale, AZ	Transferred to Kansas State

=== Incoming transfers ===
Name	Number	Pos.	Height	Weight	Year	Hometown	Previous School
Steven Ashworth	1	G	6'1"	170	Senior	Alpine, UT	Utah State
Jonathan Lawson	2	G	6'6"	188	Sophomore	Memphis, TN	Memphis
Issac Traudt	41	F	6'10"	235	RS freshman	Grand Island, NE	Virginia

=== Recruiting classes ===
==== 2023 recruiting class ====
College recruiting
Name	Hometown	School	Height	Weight	Commit date
Josiah Dotzler; PG	Bellevue, NE	Bellevue West High School	6 ft 4 in (1.93 m)	180 lb (82 kg)	Aug 1, 2022
Josiah Dotzler; PG	Recruit ratings: Rivals: 247Sports: ESPN: (NR)				
Brock Vice; C	Memphis, TN	Houston	6 ft 10 in (2.08 m)	225 lb (102 kg)	May 5, 2023
Brock Vice; C	Recruit ratings: 247Sports: ESPN: (NR)				
Overall recruit ranking: Rivals: 80
Note: In many cases, Scout, Rivals, 247Sports, On3, and ESPN may conflict in their listings of height and weight.; In these cases, the average was taken. ESPN grades are on a 100-point scale.; Sources: "2023 Team Ranking". Rivals.

== Roster ==
2023–24 Creighton Bluejays men's basketball team
Players
Coaches

Pos.	#	Name	Height	Weight	Year	Previous school	Hometown
F	0	Jasen Green	6 ft 8 in (2.03 m)	235 lb (107 kg)	RS Fr	Millard North	Omaha, NE
G	1	Steven Ashworth	6 ft 1 in (1.85 m)	170 lb (77 kg)	Sr	Lone Peak; Utah State	Alpine, UT
G	2	Jonathan Lawson	6 ft 6 in (1.98 m)	188 lb (85 kg)	So	Houston; Memphis	Memphis, TN
G	4	Sterling Knox	6 ft 4 in (1.93 m)	200 lb (91 kg)	Fr	Red Rocks Academy	Las Vegas, NV
G	5	Francisco Farabello	6 ft 3 in (1.91 m)	180 lb (82 kg)	Sr	NBA Global Academy; TCU	Cañada de Gómez, Argentina
C	10	Brock Vice	6 ft 10 in (2.08 m)	238 lb (108 kg)	RS Fr	Houston HS	Memphis, TN
C	11	Ryan Kalkbrenner	7 ft 1 in (2.16 m)	260 lb (118 kg)	Sr	Trinity Catholic HS	St. Louis, MO
G	12	Shane Thomas	6 ft 3 in (1.91 m)	200 lb (91 kg)	Fr	Red Rocks Academy	Las Vegas, NV
F	13	Mason Miller	6 ft 9 in (2.06 m)	190 lb (86 kg)	RS So	Houston HS	Germantown, TN
G	14	Sami Osmani (W)	6 ft 4 in (1.93 m)	205 lb (93 kg)	Sr	Oak Lawn Community HS	Oak Lawn, IL
G	15	Josiah Dotzler	6 ft 3 in (1.91 m)	180 lb (82 kg)	Fr	Bellevue West	Omaha, NE
G	23	Trey Alexander	6 ft 4 in (1.93 m)	190 lb (86 kg)	Jr	Heritage Hall	Oklahoma City, OK
F	32	Josh Townley-Thomas	6 ft 10 in (2.08 m)	220 lb (100 kg)	So	Creighton Prep	Omaha, NE
C	33	Fredrick King	6 ft 10 in (2.08 m)	245 lb (111 kg)	So	NBA Academy Latin America	Mangrove Cay, Bahamas
F	41	Isaac Traudt	6 ft 10 in (2.08 m)	235 lb (107 kg)	RS Fr	Grand Island Senior; Virginia	Grand Island, NE
G	55	Baylor Scheierman	6 ft 7 in (2.01 m)	205 lb (93 kg)	Sr	Aurora HS; South Dakota State	Aurora, NE

Head coach

- Greg McDermott (Northern Iowa)

Assistant coach(es)

- Derek Kellogg (UMass)
- Ryan Miller (Northern State)
- Jalen Courtney-Williams (Morehead State)

Legend

- (C) Team captain
- (S) Suspended
- (I) Ineligible
- (W) Walk-on
- Injured
- Current redshirt

Roster

== Schedule and results ==
Date time, TV	Rank^{#}	Opponent^{#}	Result	Record	High points	High rebounds	High assists	Site (attendance) city, state
Bahamas Exhibition Tour
August 4, 2023*; 5:00 pm, FloHoops		vs. Bahamas Select	W 108–55	−	13 – Kalkbrenner	13 – King	7 – Ashworth	Imperial Ballroom (200); Nassau, Bahamas
August 6, 2023*; 10:00 am, FloHoops		vs. BC Zalgiris Kaunas (Lithuania)	W 76–62	−	29 – Alexander	10 – Kalkbrenner	5 – Alexander	Imperial Ballroom (200); Nassau, Bahamas
August 8, 2023*; 10:00 am, FloHoops		vs. Obras Basket (Argentina)	W 111–89	−	16 – Miller	9 – Tied	6 – Ashworth	Imperial Ballroom (200); Nassau, Bahamas
Exhibition
November 3, 2023*; 7:00 p.m., FloHoops	No. 8	Wayne State (NE)	W 95–48	−	22 – Alexander	8 – Tied	6 – Ashworth	CHI Health Center Omaha (17,132); Omaha, NE
Non-conference regular season
November 7, 2023*; 8:00 p.m., FS1	No. 8	Florida A&M	W 105–54	1–0	20 – Alexander	9 – King	5 – Alexander	CHI Health Center Omaha (16,117); Omaha, NE
November 11, 2023*; 1:00 p.m., FS2	No. 8	North Dakota State	W 89–60	2–0	21 – Alexander	7 – Alexander	6 – Scheierman	CHI Health Center Omaha (16,911); Omaha, NE
November 14, 2023*; 9:00 p.m., FS1	No. 8	Iowa; Gavitt Tipoff Games	W 92–84	3–0	23 – Alexander	11 – Alexander	9 – Alexander	CHI Health Center Omaha (17,352); Omaha, NE
November 18, 2023*; 7:30 p.m., FS2	No. 8	Texas Southern	W 82–50	4–0	23 – Scheierman	10 – Kalkbrenner	8 – Alexander	CHI Health Center Omaha (16,845); Omaha, NE
November 22, 2023*; 3:00 p.m., CBSSN	No. 8	vs. Loyola Chicago; Hall of Fame Classic semifinals	W 88–65	5–0	29 – Kalkbrenner	12 – Scheierman	5 – Farabello	T-Mobile Center; Kansas City, MO
November 23, 2023*; 3:00 p.m., CBSSN	No. 8	vs. Colorado State; Hall of Fame Classic championship	L 48–69	5–1	15 – Scheierman	6 – Tied	3 – Tied	T-Mobile Center; Kansas City, MO
November 30, 2023*; 8:00 p.m., ESPN2	No. 15	at Oklahoma State; Big East–Big 12 Battle	W 79–65	6–1	21 – Scheierman	12 – Kalkbrenner	5 – Ashworth	Gallagher-Iba Arena (6,309); Stillwater, OK
December 3, 2023*; 3:00 p.m., FS1	No. 15	at Nebraska; Rivalry	W 89–60	7–1	24 – Schiereman	12 – Kalkbrenner	5 – Alexander	Pinnacle Bank Arena (15,838); Lincoln, NE
December 9, 2023*; 1:00 p.m., FS2	No. 10	Central Michigan	W 109–64	8–1	18 – Traudt	7 – Alexander	9 – Schiereman	CHI Health Center Omaha (16,412); Omaha, NE
December 13, 2023*; 8:00 p.m., CBSSN	No. 8	vs. UNLV; Jack Jones Classic	L 64–79	8–2	22 – Kalkbrenner	8 – Kalkbrenner	7 – Scheierman	Dollar Loan Center (2,725); Henderson, NV
December 16, 2023*; 7:00 p.m., FOX	No. 8	Alabama	W 85–82	9–2	22 – Alexander	8 – Kalkbrenner	9 – Schiereman	CHI Health Center Omaha (17,401); Omaha, NE
Big East regular season
December 20, 2023; 8:00 p.m., FS1	No. 12	Villanova	L 66–68 ^{OT}	9–3 (0–1)	16 – Tied	15 – Alexander	3 – Tied	CHI Health Center Omaha (17,333); Omaha, NE
December 30, 2023; 1:00 p.m., CBS	No. 22	at No. 10 Marquette	L 67–72	9–4 (0–2)	23 – Scheierman	8 – Scheierman	6 – Alexander	Fiserv Forum (18,086); Milwaukee, WI
January 2, 2024; 6:00 p.m., CBSSN		at Georgetown	W 77–60	10–4 (1–2)	25 – Alexander	12 – Scheierman	7 – Ashworth	Capital One Arena (4,980); Washington, D.C.
January 6, 2024; 1:00 p.m., FS1		No. 23 Providence	W 69–60	11–4 (2–2)	22 – Kalkbrenner	12 – Kalkbrenner	5 – Alexander	CHI Health Center Omaha (17,253); Omaha, NE
January 9, 2024; 8:00 p.m., CBSSN	No. 22	at DePaul	W 84–58	12–4 (3–2)	20 – Tied	9 – Kalkbrenner	7 – Ashworth	Wintrust Arena (3,061); Chicago, IL
January 13, 2024; 12:00 p.m., FOX	No. 22	St. John's	W 66–65	13–4 (4–2)	18 – Kalkbrenner	12 – Scheierman	5 – Alexander	CHI Health Center Omaha (17,164); Omaha, NE
January 17, 2024; 6:00 p.m., FS1	No. 18	at No. 1 UConn	L 48–62	13–5 (4–3)	14 – Ashworth	8 – Kalkbrenner	3 – Alexander	Harry A. Gampel Pavilion (10,299); Storrs, CT
January 20, 2024; 11:00 a.m., FS1	No. 18	at Seton Hall	W 97–94 ^{3OT}	14–5 (5–3)	28 – Kalkbrenner	10 – Scheierman	8 – Ashworth	Prudential Center (10,481); Newark, NJ
January 23, 2024; 7:30 p.m., FS1	No. 17	Xavier	W 85–78	15–5 (6–3)	27 – Alexander	9 – Tied	7 – Ashworth	CHI Health Center Omaha (17,195); Omaha, NE
January 27, 2024; 6:00 p.m., FS1	No. 17	DePaul	W 85–62	16–5 (7–3)	23 – Alexander	10 – Tied	7 – Alexander	CHI Health Center Omaha (18,571); Omaha, NE
February 2, 2024; 8:00 p.m., FS1	No. 13	Butler	L 98–99	16–6 (7–4)	26 – Tied	11 – Scheierman	4 – Tied	CHI Health Center Omaha (17,874); Omaha, NE
February 7, 2024; 7:30 p.m., FS2	No. 19	at Providence	L 87–91 ^{OT}	16–7 (7–5)	27 – Scheierman	12 – Scheierman	7 – Kalkbrenner	Amica Mutual Pavilion (12,078); Providence, RI
February 10, 2024; 11:30 a.m., FOX	No. 19	at Xavier	W 78–71	17–7 (8–5)	28 – Kalkbrenner	12 – Schiereman	9 – Ashworth	Cintas Center (10,555); Cincinnati, OH
February 13, 2024; 7:40 p.m., FS1	No. 17	Georgetown	W 94–72	18–7 (9–5)	26 – Alexander	11 – Scheierman	11 – Scheierman	CHI Health Center Omaha (16,768); Omaha, NE
February 17, 2024; 11:30 a.m., FOX	No. 17	at Butler	W 79–57	19–7 (10–5)	27 – Scheierman	10 – Scheierman	8 – Ashworth	Hinkle Fieldhouse (9,176); Indianapolis, IN
February 20, 2024; 7:30 p.m., FS1	No. 15	No. 1 UConn	W 85–66	20–7 (11–5)	20 – Ashworth	7 – Tied	6 – Scheierman	CHI Health Center Omaha (18,071); Omaha, NE
February 25, 2024; 11:00 a.m., CBS	No. 15	at St. John's	L 66–80	20–8 (11–6)	31 – Alexander	10 – Kalkbrenner	4 – Kalkbrenner	Madison Square Garden (12,061); New York, NY
February 28, 2024; 8:00 p.m., FS1	No. 12	Seton Hall	W 85–64	21–8 (12–6)	23 – Kalkbrenner	11 – Scheierman	10 – Alexander	CHI Health Center Omaha (17,022); Omaha, NE
March 2, 2024; 1:30 p.m., FOX	No. 12	No. 5 Marquette	W 89–75	22–8 (13–6)	26 – Scheierman	16 – Scheierman	10 – Alexander	CHI Health Center Omaha (18,011); Omaha, NE
March 9, 2024; 2:30 p.m., FOX	No. 10	at Villanova	W 69–67	23–8 (14–6)	18 – Scheierman	8 – Scheierman	8 – Ashworth	Wells Fargo Center (13,422); Philadelphia, PA
Big East tournament
March 14, 2024; 6:00 p.m., FS1	(2) No. 8	vs. (7) Providence; Quarterfinals	L 73–78	23–9	19 – Tied	13 – Scheierman	6 – Ashworth	Madison Square Garden (−); New York, NY
NCAA Tournament
March 21, 2024*; 12:30 p.m., TNT	(3 MW) No. 11	vs. (14 MW) Akron; First Round	W 77–60	24–9	23 – Kalkbrenner	13 – Scheierman	5 – Ashworth	PPG Paints Arena; Pittsburgh, PA
March 23, 2024*; 8:40 p.m., TBS/truTV	(3 MW) No. 11	vs. (11 MW) Oregon; Second Round	W 86–73 ^{2OT}	25–9	21 – Ashworth	14 – Kalkbrenner	5 – Tied	PPG Paints Arena (18,595); Pittsburgh, PA
March 29, 2024*; 9:10 p.m., TBS/TruTV	(3 MW) No. 11	vs. (2 MW) No. 6 Tennessee; Sweet Sixteen	L 75–82	25–10	25 – Scheierman	7 – Tied	6 – Alexander	Little Caesars Arena (18,574); Detroit, MI
*Non-conference game. ^{#}Rankings from AP Poll. (#) Tournament seedings in parentheses. MW=Midwest region. All times are in Central Time.

== Rankings ==
Ranking movements Legend: ██ Increase in ranking ██ Decrease in ranking RV = Received votes
	Week																				
Poll	Pre	1	2	3	4	5	6	7	8	9	10	11	12	13	14	15	16	17	18	19	Final
AP	8	8	8	15	10	8	12	22	RV	22	18	17	13	19	17	15	12	10	8	11	13
Coaches	8	7	7	14	11	8	14	20	RV	20	15	16	13	18	16	15	12	10	6	11	11
