= Aaron Jones (running back) =

American football player (born 1994)

Aaron Jones Sr.
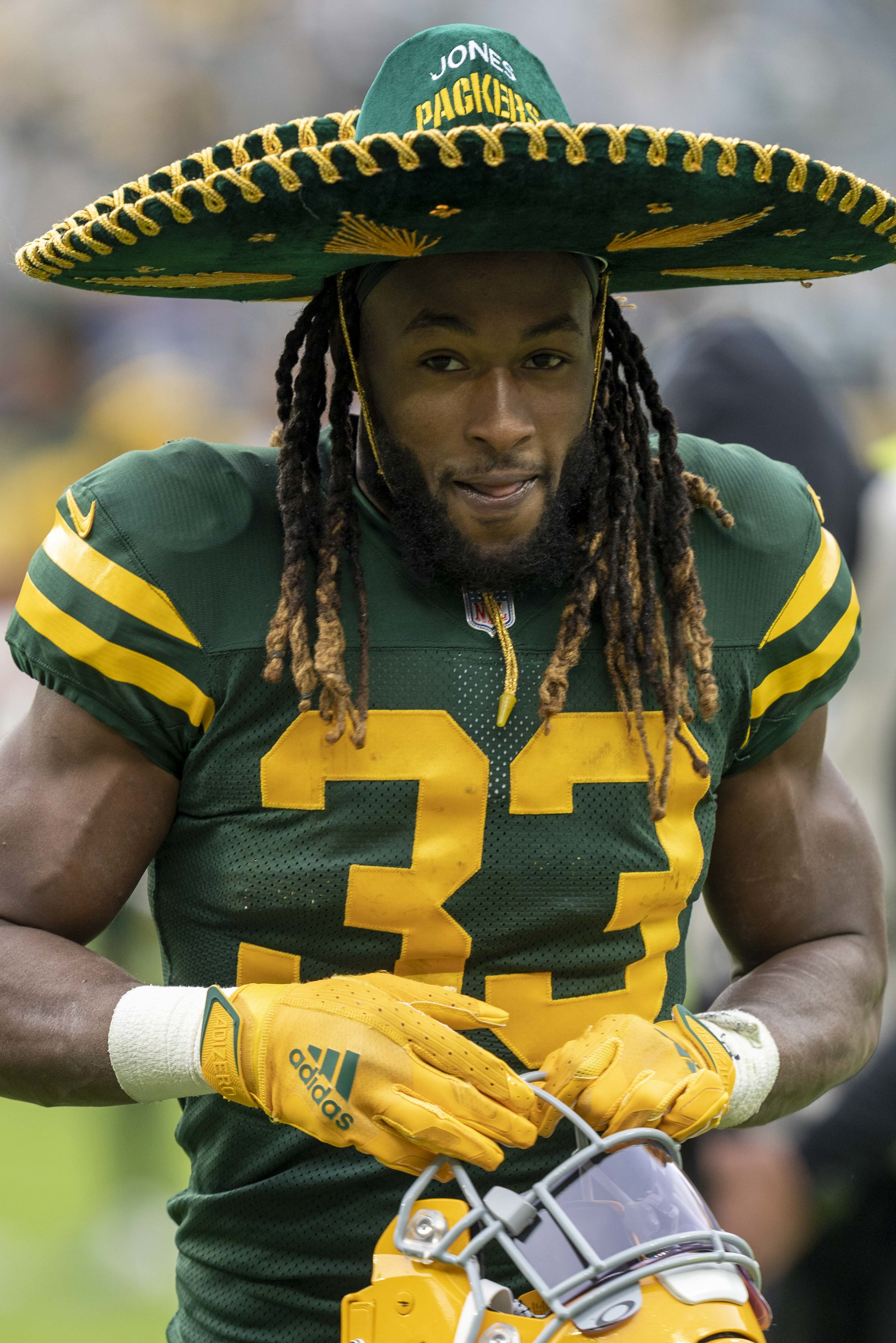
- Jones with the Green Bay Packers in 2021

No. 33 – Minnesota Vikings
- Position: Running back
- Roster status: Active

Personal information
- Born: December 2, 1994 (age 31); Savannah, Georgia, U.S.
- Listed height: 5 ft 10 in (1.78 m)
- Listed weight: 208 lb (94 kg)

Career information
- High school: Burges (El Paso, Texas)
- College: UTEP (2013–2016)
- NFL draft: 2017: 5th round, 182nd overall pick

Career history
- Green Bay Packers (2017–2023); Minnesota Vikings (2024–present)

Awards and highlights
- Pro Bowl (2020); NFL rushing touchdowns co-leader (2019)

Career NFL statistics as of Week 10, 2026
- Rushing yards: 8,147
- Rushing average: 4.8
- Rushing touchdowns: 55
- Receptions: 368
- Receiving yards: 2,786
- Receiving touchdowns: 21
- Stats at Pro Football Reference

Aaron LaRae Jones Sr. (born December 2, 1994) is an American professional football running back for the Minnesota Vikings of the National Football League (NFL). He played college football for the UTEP Miners and was selected by the Green Bay Packers in the fifth round of the 2017 NFL draft. In seven seasons with the Packers, Jones led the league in rushing touchdowns in 2019, made the Pro Bowl in 2020, and ranks third in the team's all-time rushing yards list.

== Early life ==
Jones was born in Savannah, Georgia, to Vurgess and Alvin Jones Sr., two career non-commissioned officers in the US Army. He and his twin brother Alvin Jr., older brother Xavier, and sister Chelsirae moved around often due to their parents' postings, living in Germany, Kentucky, Tennessee, Virginia, and near the Mexican border in the city of El Paso.

As a child, Jones looked up to Emmitt Smith. He attended and played high school football for Burges High School in El Paso, Texas. He had a three-star composite rating from 247Sports.com. His father retired before his senior year and started a marketing company to jump-start the recruiting process for his sons.

== College career ==
Jones attended and played college football for the UTEP Miners from 2013 to 2016 under head coach Sean Kugler.

As a freshman, Jones played in nine football games. In his collegiate debut, against New Mexico, he had 11 carries for 127 yards and two rushing touchdowns. On October 26, against Rice, he had a season-high 186 rushing yards. Overall, he finished the 2013 season with 811 rushing yards, four rushing touchdowns, and four receptions for 14 yards.

As a sophomore, Jones played in 12 games. He started off the 2014 season with three strong performances. In the season opener, he had 237 rushing yards and three rushing touchdowns in a victory at New Mexico. In the next game, a loss to Texas Tech, he had 144 rushing yards and two rushing touchdowns. One week later, against New Mexico State, he had 168 rushing yards and two rushing touchdowns. On November 15, against North Texas, he had 177 rushing yards and two rushing touchdowns in the win. On November 29, against Middle Tennessee State, he had 147 rushing yards and a rushing touchdown to go along with a 72-yard touchdown reception in the victory. Overall, in the 2014 season, he finished with 1,321 rushing yards (then fourth in school history), 11 rushing touchdowns, 30 receptions, 293 receiving yards, and three receiving touchdowns.

As a junior, Jones played in only two games due to suffering an ankle injury early in the season. On the year, he finished with 209 rushing yards, one rushing touchdown, 106 receiving yards, and one receiving touchdown. 91 of those came on the longest rushing play in school history against Texas Tech.

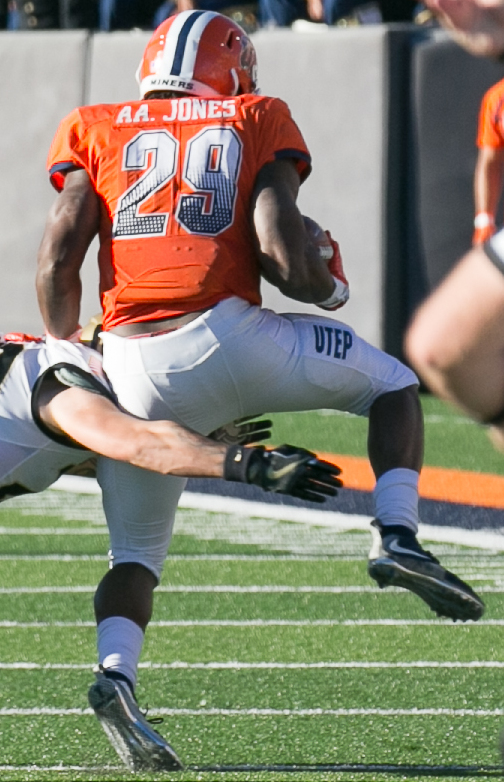
Jones at UTEP in 2016

As a senior, Jones played in 12 games. In his first game back from the ankle injury, he had 249 rushing yards and two rushing touchdowns in a win over New Mexico State, then the third-most in school history. In his second game of the season, Jones had 123 rushing yards on 18 carries in a loss against the Texas Longhorns with the Miners' lone touchdown of the game coming from a 51-yard run by Jones. On October 29, against Old Dominion, he threw a three-yard passing touchdown in the loss. In the next game against Houston Baptist, he had 228 rushing yards and two rushing touchdowns. He followed that up with 229 rushing yards and two more rushing touchdowns in a loss at Florida Atlantic. In his finale collegiate game, a win over North Texas, he had 301 rushing yards and four rushing touchdowns, second only to Fred Wendt's 326 yards in 1948 in school history. Overall, he had eight carries of more than 40 yards and finished his final collegiate season with 1,773 rushing yards, 17 rushing touchdowns, 28 receptions, 233 receiving yards, three receiving touchdowns, and one passing touchdown.

This made Jones the most prolific rusher in UTEP Miners history and a top player. In terms of rushing yards, he had five of the school's top 12 games, and school records of 17 games with 100+ yards rushing, and five with 200+ yards. He holds the record for most rushing yards in a career (4,114), season (1,773; also fifth his second year), and career yards per game (117.5) including the 2nd- and 6th-best seasons in school history (147.8 in 2016; 110.1 in 2014). He is second all-time with 33 rushing touchdowns, including the school's 3rd- and 7th-best seasons (17 in 2016; 11 in 2014). His 4,760 career all-purpose yards and 136.0 per game average are both second all-time and included the school's fourth- and eighth-best seasons. He has three of the school's 10 longest rushing plays, including the record 91-yarder from his short junior season. His 240 career points scored is 4th all-time, and 2nd among non-kickers.

== Professional career ==
Pre-draft measurables
Height	Weight	Arm length	Hand span	Wingspan	40-yard dash	10-yard split	20-yard split	20-yard shuttle	Three-cone drill	Vertical jump	Broad jump	Bench press	Wonderlic
5 ft 9 1/2 in (1.77 m)	208 lb (94 kg)	32 1/2 in (0.83 m)	9 1/2 in (0.24 m)	6 ft 4 1/4 in (1.94 m)	4.56 s	1.53 s	2.57 s	4.20 s	6.82 s	37.5 in (0.95 m)	10 ft 7 in (3.23 m)	16 reps	19
All values are from NFL Combine

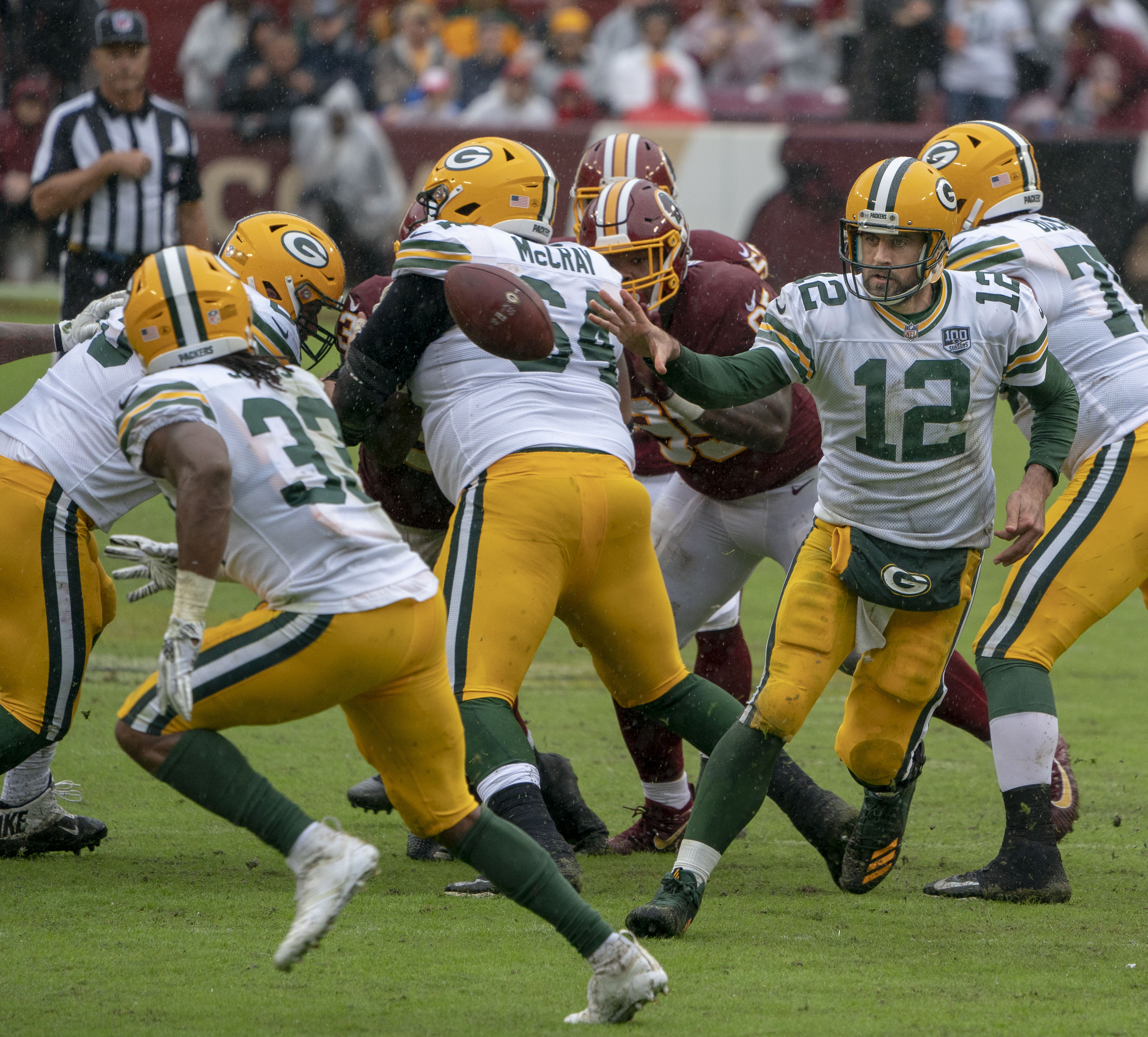
Jones receiving a toss from Aaron Rodgers in 2018

=== Green Bay Packers ===
==== 2017 season ====
Jones was selected by the Green Bay Packers in the fifth round, 182nd overall, in the 2017 NFL draft. He was the 19th running back selected in that year's draft. He was signed to a contract on May 5, 2017. After injuries to Ty Montgomery and Jamaal Williams, Jones came into the Thursday Night Football game against the Chicago Bears in Week 4. In the game, he had 13 carries for 49 yards and his first career rushing touchdown in the 35–14 victory. In Week 5 against the Dallas Cowboys, Jones tallied 19 carries for 125 yards. He also had one lone target, for a nine-yard gain. In the second quarter, Jones rushed up the middle for a seven-yard touchdown, which was the second touchdown of his career. In Week 7, against the New Orleans Saints, he had 17 carries for 131 yards and a touchdown. Overall, he finished his rookie season with 448 rushing yards (second on the team to fellow rookie Jamaal Williams, ninth among NFL rookies), a team-leading four rushing touchdowns, nine receptions, and 22 receiving yards.

==== 2018 season ====
On July 3, 2018, Jones was suspended the first two games of the 2018 season for violating the NFL's Substance Abuse policy. On September 23, his first game back from his suspension, Jones rushed six times for 42 yards in a 31–17 loss to the Washington Redskins. The following week, in a 22–0 win over the Buffalo Bills, he had 11 rushes for 65 yards and a touchdown. He took over the starting duties in Week 6, though he continued to share carries with Williams and Montgomery. By Week 9, he had enough rushes to qualify for the NFL leaderboards and took over the top spot in yards-per-rush at 6.02. On November 11, he had 15 carries for a career-high 145 yards and two rushing touchdowns in a 31–12 Week 10 victory over the Miami Dolphins. The following week, he caught his first NFL receiving touchdown and ran for another in a 24–27 loss to the Seattle Seahawks. In Week 12, he scored his fifth touchdown in three games on route to 93 total yards against the Minnesota Vikings. He suffered a knee injury in Week 15 and was placed on injured reserve on December 18, 2018. Overall, he finished the 2018 season with 728 rushing yards, eight rushing touchdowns, 26 receptions, 206 receiving yards, and one receiving touchdown.

In his first two seasons, Jones' averaged 9 touches per game and a league-leading 5.5 yards per carry.

==== 2019 season ====
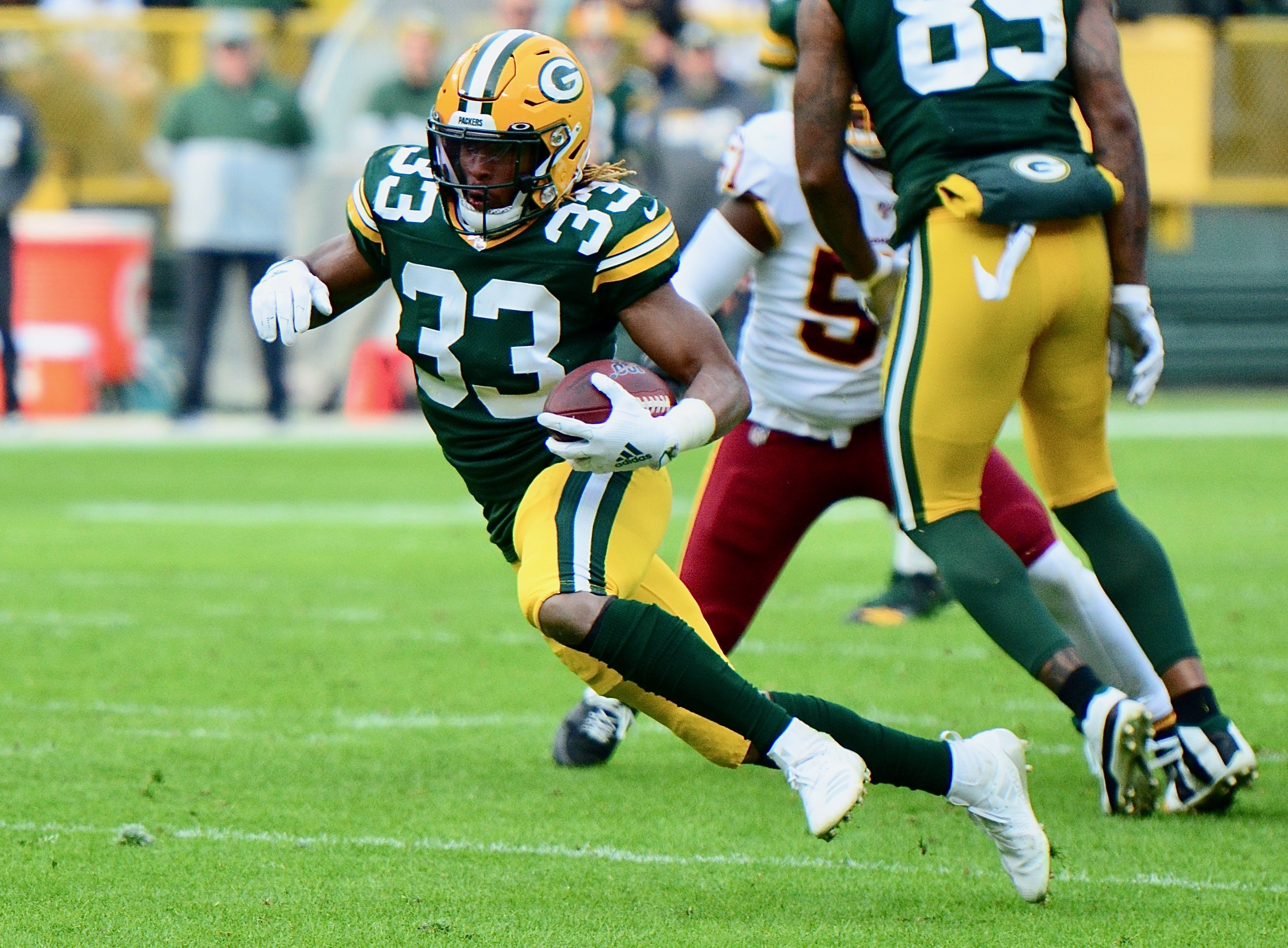
Jones in a game against the Washington Redskins

In Week 2 against the Vikings, Jones rushed 23 times for 116 yards and a touchdown as the Packers won 21–16. In Week 3 against the Denver Broncos, Jones rushed 10 times for 19 yards and two touchdowns as the Packers won 27–16. During Week 5 against the Cowboys, Jones finished with 107 rushing yards, 75 receiving yards, and four touchdowns as the Packers won 34–24, earning him NFC Offensive Player of the Week. During Sunday Night Football against the Kansas City Chiefs in Week 8, Jones finished with 13 carries for 67 rushing yards, seven catches for 159 receiving yards, and two receiving touchdowns as the Packers won 31–24. He was named the NFC Offensive Player of the Week for his performance. In Week 10 against the Carolina Panthers, Jones rushed 13 times for 93 yards and three touchdowns in the 24–16 win. In Week 14 against the Redskins, Jones rushed 16 times for 134 yards and a touchdown in the 20–15 win. During a rematch with the Minnesota Vikings on Monday Night Football in Week 16, Jones highlighted a big play with a 56-yard touchdown run. Overall, he finished with 154 rushing yards and two touchdowns on 23 rushes as the Packers won 23–10. In Week 17 against the Detroit Lions, Jones rushed 25 times for 100 yards and caught two passes for 43 yards in the 23–20 win. During the game, Jones played a career-high 75 snaps and surpassed 1,000 rushing yards for the first time in his career. In his 285 touches in the 2019 season, Jones finished with totals of 1,084 rushing yards and 16 rushing touchdowns to go along with 49 receptions for 474 receiving yards and three receiving touchdowns.

In the Divisional Round of the playoffs against the Seahawks, Jones rushed 21 times for 62 yards and two touchdowns during the 28–23 win. In the NFC Championship against the San Francisco 49ers, Jones rushed 12 times for 56 yards and a touchdown and caught five passes for 27 yards and a touchdown during the 37–20 loss. He was ranked 33rd by his fellow players on the NFL Top 100 Players of 2020.

==== 2020 season ====
In Week 2 against the Lions, Jones rushed 18 times for a career-high 168 yards and two rushing touchdowns, one of which was a 75-yard touchdown, and caught four passes for 68 yards and a receiving touchdown during the 42–21 win. In Week 4 against the Atlanta Falcons on Monday Night Football, Jones totaled 101 yards from scrimmage and a receiving touchdown during the 30–16 win. In Week 13 against the Philadelphia Eagles, Jones rushed for 130 yards, including a 77-yard touchdown, during the 30–16 win. In Week 15 against the Panthers, Jones recorded 158 yards from scrimmage and a rushing touchdown during the 24–16 win. On December 21, 2020, he was selected for the 2021 Pro Bowl. Jones finished the 2020 season with 201 carries for 1,104 rushing yards and nine rushing touchdowns to go along with 47 receptions for 355 receiving yards and two receiving touchdowns.

In the Divisional Round of the playoffs against the Los Angeles Rams, Jones rushed for 99 yards and a touchdown during the 32–18 win. In the NFC Championship against the Tampa Bay Buccaneers, Jones rushed for 27 yards before exiting the game due to an injury during the 31–26 loss. He was ranked 30th by his fellow players on the NFL Top 100 Players of 2021.

==== 2021 season ====
On March 26, 2021, Jones signed a four-year, $48 million contract with the Packers. He has seen his production decrease as head coach Matt LaFleur has increased the usage of second-year teammate A. J. Dillon, failing to reach 1,000 rushing yards for the first time since 2018.

In Week 1 against the Saints, Jones rushed five times for just nine yards. He bounced back the following week against the Lions, rushing for 66 yards and a touchdown on 17 carries, and added six receptions for 48 yards and three receiving touchdowns. He was the first Packers running back to catch three touchdowns in a game since Andy Uram in 1942, as the Packers won 35–17. Jones had his first 100-yard game in a Week 5 25–22 overtime win against the Cincinnati Bengals, tallying 103 yards on 14 carries, including a season-long 57-yard run. In Week 8 against the Arizona Cardinals, with wide receivers Davante Adams, Allen Lazard and Marquez Valdes-Scantling out due to COVID or injury, Jones was the primary target of quarterback Aaron Rodgers, catching a team-high seven passes for 51 yards as the Packers won 24–21.

In Week 10 against the Seahawks, Jones went down with an MCL sprain. He returned to limited action in a Week 12 win over the Rams. He surpassed 1,000 yards from scrimmage for the third consecutive year in a Week 16 victory over the Cleveland Browns. Jones finished the 2021 season with 171 carries for 799 rushing yards and four rushing touchdowns to go along with 52 receptions for 391 receiving yards and six receiving touchdowns.

The Packers earned a first-round bye and faced off against the 49ers in the Divisional Round. Jones had 41 rushing yards on 12 carries but had nine receptions for 129 receiving yards in the 13–10 loss.

==== 2022 season ====
In Week 2, against the Bears, Jones had 15 carries for 132 rushing yards and one rushing touchdown to go along with three receptions for 38 receiving yards and a receiving touchdown. In Week 4, against the New England Patriots, he had 16 carries for 110 rushing yards in the 27–24 overtime victory. In Week 7, against the Washington Commanders, he had two receiving touchdowns in the 23–21 loss. In the following game, against the Bills, he had 20 carries for 143 rushing yards. In Week 10, against the Cowboys in a 31–28 victory, he had 24 carries for 138 rushing yards and a rushing touchdown. In Week 17, in a 41–17 win over the Minnesota Vikings, he had 14 carries for 111 rushing yards. Jones rushed for a personal best 1,121 yards on 213 carries. He had two rushing touchdowns and five receiving touchdowns. He was ranked 64th by his fellow players on the NFL Top 100 Players of 2023.

==== 2023 season ====
In Week 1 against the Bears, Jones had one rushing and one receiving touchdown and 127 scrimmage yards. Jones suffered a Grade 1 left hamstring strain in that game and did not return. He was inactive the next week.

Jones missed six games in the season, but still finished with 656 rushing yards, 233 receiving yards and three touchdowns. In back-to-back-to-back must-win games for the Packers to earn a playoff berth in the team's first season with Jordan Love as the starting quarterback, Jones recorded at least 130 offensive yards in each game, helping secure a wild-card playoff spot.

Jones ran for 118 yards with three touchdowns on 21 attempts in a Wild Card Round 48–32 win over the Cowboys at AT&T Stadium. In that performance, Jones set the franchise record for playoff rushing touchdowns with seven and tied the record for most rushing touchdowns by a Packer in a playoff game.

In a season-ending 24–21 Divisional Round loss to the 49ers, Jones became the first player in the more than 100-year history of the Green Bay Packers to record five consecutive 100-yard rushing games.

On March 11, 2024, Jones was released by the Packers after seven seasons.

=== Minnesota Vikings ===
On March 12, 2024, Jones signed a one-year contract with the Minnesota Vikings. In Week 12, against the Chicago Bears, he had 22 carries for 106 yards and a touchdown in the 30–27 win. In the 2024 season, Jones had 255 carries for 1,138 rushing yards and five rushing touchdowns to go with 51 receptions for 408 receiving yards and two receiving touchdowns. Jones was ranked 98th by his fellow players on the NFL Top 100 Players of 2025.

On March 9, 2025, Jones re-signed with the Vikings on a two-year, $20 million contract. After starting Minnesota's first two games of the year, he was placed on injured reserve due to a hamstring injury on September 16. Jones was activated on October 22, ahead of the team's Week 8 matchup against the Los Angeles Chargers. In the 2025 season, he appeared in 12 games and finished with 132 carries for 548 rushing yards and two rushing touchdowns to go with 28 receptions for 199 receiving yards and one receiving touchdown.

== Career statistics ==
Legend
	Led the league
**Bold**	Career high

=== NFL ===
==== Regular season ====
Year	Team	Games		Rushing					Receiving					Fumbles	
Year	Team	GP	GS	Att	Yds	Avg	Lng	TD	Rec	Yds	Avg	Lng	TD	Fum	Lost
2017	GB	12	4	81	488	**5.5**	46	4	9	22	2.4	9	0	0	0
2018	GB	12	8	133	728	**5.5**	67	8	26	206	7.9	24	1	1	1
2019	GB	16	16	236	1,084	4.6	56	**16**	49	**474**	**9.7**	**67**	3	3	2
2020	GB	14	14	201	1,104	**5.5**	**77**	9	47	355	7.6	30	2	2	0
2021	GB	15	15	171	799	4.7	57	4	52	391	7.5	26	**6**	2	1
2022	GB	17	17	213	1,121	5.3	36	2	**59**	395	6.7	30	5	**5**	**3**
2023	GB	11	11	142	656	4.6	39	2	30	233	7.8	51	1	2	1
2024	MIN	17	17	**255**	**1,138**	4.5	41	5	51	408	8.0	25	2	**5**	**3**
2025	MIN	12	12	132	548	4.2	31	2	28	199	7.1	27	1	2	1
2026	MIN	9	9	126	521	4.1	20	3	17	103	6.1	15	0	3	0
Career		135	123	1,690	8,147	4.8	77T	55	368	2,786	7.6	67T	21	25	12

==== Postseason ====
Year	Team	Games		Rushing					Receiving					Fumbles	
Year	Team	GP	GS	Att	Yds	Avg	Lng	TD	Rec	Yds	Avg	Lng	TD	Fum	Lost
2019	GB	2	2	33	118	3.6	23	**3**	6	31	5.2	9	**1**	0	0
2020	GB	2	2	20	126	**6.3**	**60**	1	5	21	4.2	14	0	**2**	**1**
2021	GB	1	1	12	41	3.4	14	0	**9**	**129**	**14.3**	**75**	0	0	0
2023	GB	2	2	**39**	**226**	5.8	53	**3**	4	21	5.3	13	0	0	0
2024	MIN	1	1	13	48	3.7	13	0	3	12	4.0	8	0	0	0
Career		8	8	117	559	4.8	60	7	27	214	7.9	75	1	2	1

=== College ===
Season	Team	GP	Rushing					Receiving				
Season	Team	GP	Att	Yds	Avg	Lng	TD	Rec	Yds	Avg	Lng	TD
2013	UTEP	9	155	811	5.2	81	4	4	14	3.5	6	0
2014	UTEP	12	**242**	1,321	5.5	73	11	**30**	**293**	9.8	**72**	**3**
2015	UTEP	2	32	209	6.5	**91**	1	9	106	**11.8**	36	1
2016	UTEP	12	229	**1,773**	**7.7**	83	**17**	28	233	8.3	42	**3**
Career		35	658	4,114	6.3	91	33	71	646	9.1	72	7

== Personal life ==
During his tenure in Green Bay, Jones was known for wearing wraparound Oakley sunglasses and a sombrero decorated in Packers colors when arriving at a stadium before a game, on the sidelines, and in postgame interviews. The sombrero is an homage to his hometown of El Paso, a majority-Hispanic city. He also pays tribute to El Paso in his signature touchdown celebration, in which he holds up nine, one, and five fingers in quick succession before flexing his bicep (El Paso is covered by area code 915).

Jones graduated from UTEP on May 12, 2018, with a degree in multidisciplinary studies, fulfilling a promise he had previously made to his parents that he would finish school even if drafted into the NFL.

Jones had a close bond with his father, Alvin Sr., who died on April 6, 2021, from COVID-19. Jones Sr. was cremated following his death, with the ashes put into a chain for Aaron. During a game against the Detroit Lions, he lost the chain upon scoring a touchdown (one of four that night), but an athletic trainer found it and returned it to him.

Jones was an ambassador of the now bankrupt FTX and received compensation via cryptocurrency. Jones had also purchased an equity stake in the exchange which he is unlikely to recoup.

On November 20, 2017, Jones was cited for a traffic stop, an incident that occurred on October 1 in Ashwaubenon, Wisconsin. The day the incident occurred Jones was speeding at 79 miles per hour (127 km/h) at a 55 miles per hour (89 km/h) speed limit and had possession of marijuana. Jones was arrested and charged with operating with a restricted controlled substance, operating without a valid license, and speeding. Jones pleaded no contest to the charges and was fined for court costs and had his license suspended for six months.

Jones' cousin, Tristen Newton, was the starting point guard for the UConn Huskies men's basketball team during their 2023 national championship run and 2024 national championship run, and was named the 2024 Final Four Most Outstanding Player. Aaron and his brother Alvin Jr. attended both Final Fours.
