= Barry J. Sanders =

American football player (born 1994)

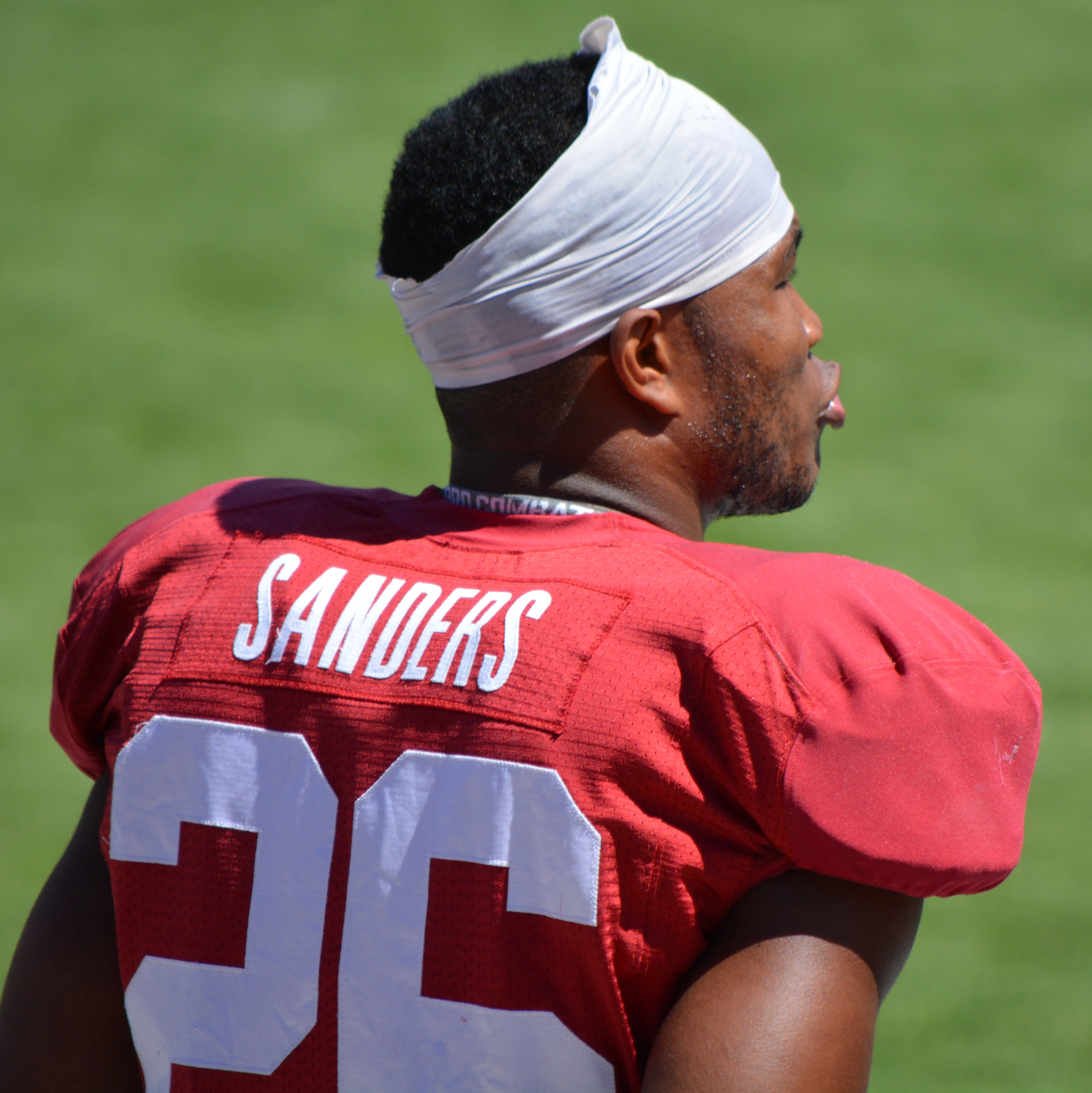
- Sanders with Stanford in 2015

No. 26
- Position: Running back

Personal information
- Born: April 10, 1994 (age 32); Oklahoma City, Oklahoma, U.S.
- Listed height: 5 ft 10 in (1.78 m)
- Listed weight: 198 lb (90 kg)

Career information
- High school: Heritage Hall (Oklahoma City)
- College: Stanford (2012–2015); Oklahoma State (2016)

Awards and highlights
- 3× Pac-12 champion (2012, 2013, 2015)
- Stats at ESPN

Barry James Sanders (born April 10, 1994) is an American former football running back. He played college football for the Stanford Cardinal football team from 2012 to 2015 and the Oklahoma State Cowboys football team in 2016. He is the son of former NFL running back Barry Sanders.

== Early life ==
Sanders, the son of Hall of Fame running back Barry Sanders and Aletha House, is often erroneously referred to as "Barry Sanders Jr.;" the elder Sanders has no middle name. He graduated from Heritage Hall High School in Oklahoma City, Oklahoma. As a freshman in 2008, Sanders ran for 742 yards and twelve touchdowns while helping Heritage Hall to the 2008 Oklahoma 2A state title, and he was the only sophomore on the 2009 Tulsa World all-state team.

== College career ==
=== Stanford ===
On January 5, 2012, during the U.S. Army All-American Bowl, Sanders announced that he had committed to playing football for Stanford University, even though he was still unsure if he would be admitted. According to ESPN, he was rated the 6th-best high school running back in the country. He was indeed admitted to Stanford, and he did join the Cardinal football team but he was redshirted as a freshman, seeing no action during the 2012 college season. During his redshirt freshman season in 2013, he was used sparingly as a running back and kick returner. He played in 12 of the Cardinal's 14 games, finishing the year with 34 rushing yards, 5 rushing attempts, and 1 touchdown. He played in all 13 games his sophomore season, finishing the 2014 season with 59 carries for 315 yards and 7 receptions for 47 yards.

Sanders returned in 2015 for his redshirt junior year and contributed as a back-up running back, kick returner and special-teams player. He played behind sophomore All-American and Heisman Trophy finalist Christian McCaffrey. Amongst his many other accomplishments that season, McCaffrey broke the elder Barry Sanders' longstanding record for most all-purpose yards in a season. The younger Barry Sanders played well in his limited backup role. During the season opener on September 5, 2015, at Northwestern University, he gained 9 yards on 2 carries. The following week, he would have a career game against the University of Central Florida. Sanders finished the game with 8 carries, 39 rushing yards, and 1 touchdown. On September 25, 2015, he continued producing for the Cardinal, rushing for a career-high 97 yards, on 7 carries, for a career-high 2 rushing touchdowns against Oregon State. During the contest he had 65 yards come on a rushing touchdown play. Sanders continued his streak the next game against the University of Arizona, ending the game with 76 yards on 4 rushing attempts, and a single touchdown. On October 15, 2015, Sanders had a career-high 10 carries for 39 yards against UCLA.

On January 5, 2016, Sanders announced that he had been granted a release from his scholarship by Stanford and intended on exploring his options to transfer to another school. He graduated in June 2016 after four years on campus, including his redshirt season; hence he had one year of eligibility left as a fifth year senior. As a graduate transfer, he would be eligible to play immediately at his new school.

=== Oklahoma State ===
On February 11, 2016, Sanders announced that he was planning to enroll in a master's degree program at Oklahoma State, his father's alma mater. Since he was a graduate transfer, he was eligible to play immediately for the 2016 season. Wearing number 26 (the same number he wore at Stanford), Sanders returned the first punt of his Oklahoma State career 57 yards, to inside the 1-yard line, nearly scoring on his first return. For the season, he had 28 carries for 93 yards and two touchdowns. He also caught nine passes for 45 yards, and returned 18 kickoffs and seven punts. After the season, he accepted a marketing job with the video game company Electronic Arts, and he announced that he had no plans to try to play professional football.
