= Alvin Jones (American football) =

American gridiron football player (born 1994)

No. 58, 49
- Position: Linebacker

Personal information
- Born: December 2, 1994 (age 31); Savannah, Georgia, U.S.
- Listed height: 5 ft 10 in (1.78 m)
- Listed weight: 230 lb (104 kg)

Career information
- High school: Burges High School
- College: UTEP
- NFL draft: 2018: undrafted

Career history
- Baltimore Ravens (2018–2019)*; Saskatchewan Roughriders (2021–2022)
- * Offseason or practice squad member only
- Stats at Pro Football Reference

Alvin Jones Jr. (born December 2, 1994) is an American former professional football linebacker. He played college football at UTEP, and originally signed with the Baltimore Ravens of the National Football League (NFL) as an undrafted free agent in 2018. He later played for the Saskatchewan Roughriders of the Canadian Football League (CFL).

== Professional career ==
=== Baltimore Ravens ===
Jones signed with the Baltimore Ravens as an undrafted free agent in 2018. He was placed on injured reserve on August 31, 2018, and was released a week later. He was re-signed to the practice squad on October 15, 2018.

Jones signed a reserve/future contract on January 7, 2019. He was placed on injured reserve on August 31, 2019, and waived from injured reserve with an injury settlement on September 10.

=== Saskatchewan Roughriders ===
After two years away from football, Jones signed with the Saskatchewan Roughriders of the CFL on October 21, 2021. He was released on June 4, 2022.

== Personal life ==
Jones is the fraternal twin brother of Minnesota Vikings running back Aaron Jones; Alvin is older than Aaron by 30 minutes. Their parents, Alvin Sr. and Vurgess, were both career NCOs in the US Army, with a combined 56 years of service.
