= 2023–24 Seton Hall Pirates men's basketball team =

American college basketball season

2023–24 Seton Hall Pirates men's basketball

NIT champions
- Conference: Big East Conference
- Record: 25–12 (13–7 Big East)
- Head coach: Shaheen Holloway (2nd season)
- Assistant coaches: Rasheen Davis; Ryan Whalen; Corey Lowery
- Home arena: Prudential Center; Walsh Gymnasium

2023–24 Big East men's basketball standings
	Conf.				Overall
Team	W		L	PCT	W		L	PCT
No. 1 UConn †	18	–	2	.900	37	–	3	.925
No. 13 Creighton	14	–	6	.700	25	–	10	.714
No. 12 Marquette	14	–	6	.700	27	–	10	.730
Seton Hall	13	–	7	.650	25	–	12	.676
St. John's	11	–	9	.550	20	–	13	.606
Villanova	10	–	10	.500	18	–	16	.529
Providence	10	–	10	.500	21	–	14	.600
Butler	9	–	11	.450	18	–	15	.545
Xavier	9	–	11	.450	16	–	18	.471
Georgetown	2	–	18	.100	9	–	23	.281
DePaul	0	–	20	.000	3	–	29	.094
† 2024 Big East tournament winner Rankings from AP Poll

The 2023–24 Seton Hall Pirates men's basketball team represented Seton Hall University in the 2023–24 NCAA Division I men's basketball season. They were led by second-year head coach Shaheen Holloway. The Pirates played their home games at the Prudential Center in Newark, New Jersey and Walsh Gymnasium in South Orange, New Jersey as members of the Big East Conference.

== Previous season ==
The Pirates finished the 2022–23 season 17–16, 10–10 in Big East play to finish in a tie for sixth place. They were defeated by DePaul in the first round of the Big East tournament. The Pirates received an at-large bid to the National Invitation Tournament (NIT), where they lost in the first round to Colorado.

== Offseason ==
=== Departures ===
Name	Number	Pos.	Height	Weight	Year	Hometown	Reason for departure
Tray Jackson	1	F	6'10"	210	Senior	Detroit, MI	Graduate transferred to Michigan
Tyrese Samuel	4	F	6'10"	230	Senior	Montreal, QC	Graduate transferred to Florida
Alexis Yetna	10	F	6'8"	225	GS senior	Paris, France	Graduate transferred to Fairfield
KC Ndefo	13	F	6'7"	206	GS senior	Elmont, NY	Graduated
Jamar Harris	15	G	6'2"	195	GS senior	North Brunswick, NJ	Graduated
Femi Odukale	21	G	6'6"	205	Junior	Brooklyn, NY	Transferred to New Mexico State
Tae Davis	22	F	6'9"	204	Freshman	Indianapolis, IN	Transferred to Notre Dame
Abdou Ndiaye	33	F	6'9"	200	Senior	Louga, Senegal	Transferred
Jorge Mercado	43	G	6'4"	215	Junior	The Bronx, NY	Walk-on; left the team for personal reasons
Elijah Muhammad	50	F	6'10"	189	Freshman	Queens, NY	Walk-on; transferred

=== Incoming transfers ===
Name	Number	Pos.	Height	Weight	Year	Hometown	Previous school
Elijah Hutchins-Everett	4	C	6'11"	255	Junior	Orange, NJ	Austin Peay
Sadraque Nganga	7	G	6'9"	205	Sophomore	Chandler, AZ	Boise State
Jaden Bediako	15	C	6'10"	245	GS senior	Brampton, ON	Santa Clara

=== 2023 recruiting class ===
College recruiting
Name	Hometown	School	Height	Weight	Commit date
Isaiah Coleman #49 SG	Raleigh, NC	Word of God Christian Academy	6 ft 4 in (1.93 m)	180 lb (82 kg)	May 8, 2023
Isaiah Coleman #49 SG	Recruit ratings: Rivals: 247Sports: ESPN: (81)				
David Tubek #47 SF	Glendale, AZ	Dream City Christian	6 ft 8 in (2.03 m)	215 lb (98 kg)	Apr 5, 2023
David Tubek #47 SF	Recruit ratings: Rivals: 247Sports: ESPN: (77)				

==== 2024 recruiting class ====
College recruiting
Name	Hometown	School	Height	Weight	Commit date
Jahseem Felton #0 SG	Charlotte, NC	Combine Academy	6 ft 5 in (1.96 m)	175 lb (79 kg)	Oct 19, 2023
Jahseem Felton #0 SG	Recruit ratings: Scout: Rivals: 247Sports: ESPN: (79)				
Godswill Erheriene #35 C	Glen Head, NY	Long Island Lutheran	6 ft 9 in (2.06 m)	225 lb (102 kg)	Nov 9, 2023
Godswill Erheriene #35 C	Recruit ratings: Scout: Rivals: 247Sports: ESPN: (80)				

== Roster ==
2023–24 Seton Hall Pirates men's basketball team
Players
Coaches

Pos.	#	Name	Height	Weight	Year	Previous school	Hometown
G	0	Dylan Addae-Wusu	6 ft 4 in (1.93 m)	230 lb (104 kg)	Sr	St. John's	The Bronx, New York
G	1	Kadary Richmond	6 ft 6 in (1.98 m)	210 lb (95 kg)	Sr	Syracuse	Brooklyn, New York
G	2	Al-Amir Dawes	6 ft 2 in (1.88 m)	180 lb (82 kg)	GS	Clemson	Newark, New Jersey
C	4	Elijah Hutchins-Everett	6 ft 11 in (2.11 m)	255 lb (116 kg)	So	Austin Peay	Orange, New Jersey
F	6	David Tubek	6 ft 7 in (2.01 m)	205 lb (93 kg)	Fr	Dream City Christian School (AZ)	Juba, South Sudan
F	7	Sadraque NgaNga	6 ft 10 in (2.08 m)	220 lb (100 kg)	So	Boise State	Luanda, Angola
C	9	Arda Ozdogan	6 ft 10 in (2.08 m)	231 lb (105 kg)	Fr	Tema Koleji	Ankara, Turkey
G	13	Jaquan Sanders	6 ft 4 in (1.93 m)	205 lb (93 kg)	So	Our Saviour Lutheran School	Queens, New York
G/F	14	Dre Davis	6 ft 6 in (1.98 m)	212 lb (96 kg)	Sr	Louisville	Indianapolis, Indiana
C	15	Jaden Bediako	6 ft 10 in (2.08 m)	245 lb (111 kg)	GS	Santa Clara	Brampton, Ontario
G	18	John David Thomas (W)	6 ft 4 in (1.93 m)	190 lb (86 kg)	Fr	IMG Academy	Tallahassee, Florida
G	19	Gionn Swann (W)	6 ft 2 in (1.88 m)	150 lb (68 kg)	Fr	Alexandria City High School	Alexandria, Virginia
G	21	Isaiah Coleman	6 ft 5 in (1.96 m)	180 lb (82 kg)	Fr	Word of God Christian Academy	Fredericksburg, Virginia
G	22	Malachi Brown	6 ft 1 in (1.85 m)	165 lb (75 kg)	Fr	Legacy Early College	Buford, Georgia
G	23	JaQuan Harris	6 ft 3 in (1.91 m)	183 lb (83 kg)	So	St. Thomas Aquianas High School	North Brunswick, New Jersey
G	41	David Gabriel (W)	6 ft 1 in (1.85 m)	160 lb (73 kg)	So	North Bergen High School	North Bergen, New Jersey

Head coach

- Shaheen Holloway (Seton Hall)

Assistant coach(es)

- Rasheen Davis (New Rochelle)
- Ryan Whalen (Saint Joseph's)
- Corey Lowery (Rutgers)

Legend

- (C) Team captain
- (S) Suspended
- (I) Ineligible
- (W) Walk-on
- Injured
- Current redshirt

Roster

== Schedule and results ==
Date time, TV	Rank^{#}	Opponent^{#}	Result	Record	High points	High rebounds	High assists	Site (attendance) city, state
Exhibition
October 28, 2023*; 4:00 p.m., –		NJIT	W 68–60	–	24 – Richmond	9 – Richmond	6 – Richmond	Wellness and Events Center (1,012); Newark, NJ
Non-conference regular season
November 6, 2023*; 7:30 p.m., FS1		Saint Peter's	W 70–59	1–0	18 – Richmond	6 – Tied	7 – Richmond	Prudential Center (8,087); Newark, NJ
November 11, 2023*; 4:00 p.m., FS2		Fairleigh Dickinson	W 85–55	2–0	14 – Richmond	10 – Bediako	3 – Addae-Wusu	Walsh Gymnasium (1,326); South Orange, NJ
November 15, 2023*; 6:30 p.m., FS1		Albany	W 96–71	3–0	21 – Dawes	8 – Coleman	4 – Richmond	Prudential Center (7,712); Newark, NJ
November 18, 2023*; 12:00 p.m., WWOR		Wagner	W 72–51	4–0	17 – Davis	10 – Richmond	5 – Richmond	Prudential Center (8,344); Newark, NJ
November 23, 2023*; 5:30 p.m., FS1		vs. No. 23 USC; Rady Children's Invitational semifinal	L 63–71	4–1	18 – Richmond	9 – Addae-Wusu	3 – Davis	LionTree Arena (3,588); San Diego, CA
November 24, 2023*; 6:00 p.m., FOX		vs. Iowa; Rady Children's Invitational 3rd place game	L 72–85	4–2	18 – Davis	11 – Bediako	3 – 3 Tied	LionTree Arena (3,912); San Diego, CA
November 29, 2023*; 6:30 p.m., FS2		Northeastern	W 88–75	5–2	25 – Dawes	8 – Bediako	6 – Richmond	Prudential Center (8,045); Newark, NJ
December 5, 2023*; 9:00 p.m., ESPN2		at No. 6 Baylor; Big East–Big 12 Battle	L 60–78	5–3	18 – Richmond	7 – Hutchins-Everett	6 – Richmond	Ferrell Center (8,269); Waco, TX
December 9, 2023*; 8:30 p.m., FS1		Rutgers; Garden State Hardwood Classic	L 63–70	5–4	21 – Richmond	11 – Bediako	4 – Richmond	Prudential Center (10,481); Newark, NJ
December 12, 2023*; 6:30 p.m., FS1		Monmouth	W 70–61	6–4	17 – Coleman	10 – Bediako	5 – Richmond	Prudential Center (8,053); Newark, NJ
December 17, 2023*; 5:00 p.m., ESPN		vs. Missouri	W 93–87	7–4	25 – Dawes	8 – Tied	6 – Addae-Wusu	T-Mobile Center (7,062); Kansas City, MO
Big East regular season
December 20, 2023; 7:00 p.m., CBSSN		No. 5 UConn	W 75–60	8–4 (1–0)	23 – Richmond	9 – Bediako	5 – Richmond	Prudential Center (9,441); Newark, NJ
December 23, 2023; 2:00 p.m., FS1		at Xavier	L 54–74	8–5 (1–1)	18 – Davis	9 – Bediako	4 – Dawes	Cintas Center (10,224); Cincinnati, OH
January 3, 2024; 6:30 p.m., FS1		at No. 23 Providence	W 61–57	9–5 (2–1)	17 – Davis	11 – Addae-Wusu	6 – Richmond	Amica Mutual Pavilion (11,458); Providence, RI
January 6, 2024; 12:00 p.m., CBSSN		No. 7 Marquette	W 78–75	10–5 (3–1)	23 – Dawes	11 – Bediako	5 – Richmond	Prudential Center (10,481); Newark, NJ
January 9, 2024; 6:30 p.m., FS1		at Georgetown	W 74–70	11–5 (4–1)	25 – Dawes	8 – Richmond	8 – Richmond	Capital One Arena (5,577); Washington, D.C.
January 13, 2024; 12:00 p.m., FS1		at Butler	W 78–72	12–5 (5–1)	24 – Richmond	12 – Richmond	5 – Richmond	Hinkle Fieldhouse (7,777); Indianapolis, IN
January 16, 2024; 8:30 p.m., FS1		St. John's	W 85–60	13–5 (6–1)	21 – Dawes	10 – Addae-Wusu	5 – Addae-Wusu	Prudential Center (9,204); Newark, NJ
January 20, 2024; 12:00 p.m., FS1		No. 18 Creighton	L 94–97 ^{3OT}	13–6 (6–2)	21 – Tied	12 – Addae-Wusu	11 – Richmond	Prudential Center (10,481); Newark, NJ
January 24, 2024; 6:30 p.m., FS1		Providence	L 63–67	13–7 (6–3)	26 – Dawes	10 – Tied	3 – Dawes	Prudential Center (8,895); Newark, NJ
January 27, 2024; 1:00 p.m., FS1		at No. 14 Marquette	L 57–75	13–8 (6–4)	18 – Bediako	9 – Davis	4 – Dawes	Fiserv Forum (17,751); Milwaukee, WI
January 30, 2024; 9:00 p.m., FS1		at DePaul	W 72–39	14–8 (7–4)	16 – Davis	12 – Davis	3 – Addae-Wusu	Wintrust Arena (2,990); Chicago, IL
February 7, 2024; 6:30 p.m., FS2		Georgetown	W 76–70	15–8 (8–4)	25 – Davis	10 – Davis	8 – Richmond	Prudential Center (9,422); Newark, NJ
February 11, 2024; 12:00 p.m., CBSSN		at Villanova	L 54–80	15–9 (8–5)	14 – Dawes	5 – Bediako	3 – Tied	Wells Fargo Center (13,754); Philadelphia, PA
February 14, 2024; 7:00 p.m., CBSSN		Xavier	W 88–70	16–9 (9–5)	20 – Richmond	9 – Bediako	13 – Richmond	Prudential Center (8,361); Newark, NJ
February 18, 2024; 5:00 p.m., FS1		at St. John's	W 68–62	17–9 (10–5)	19 – Dawes	11 – Richmond	2 – Tied	UBS Arena (9,584); Elmont, NY
February 24, 2024; 8:30 p.m., FS2		Butler	W 76–64	18–9 (11–5)	21 – Davis	9 – Bediako	4 – Addae-Wusu	Prudential Center (10,481); Newark, NJ
February 28, 2024; 9:00 p.m., FS1		at No. 12 Creighton	L 64–85	18–10 (11–6)	18 – Davis	8 – Davis	4 – Richmond	CHI Health Center Omaha (17,022); Omaha, NE
March 3, 2024; 12:00 p.m., CBS		at No. 3 UConn	L 61–91	18–11 (11–7)	20 – Davis	5 – Tied	2 – Richmond	Harry A. Gampel Pavilion (10,299); Storrs, CT
March 6, 2024; 6:30 p.m., FS1		Villanova	W 66–56	19–11 (12–7)	20 – Richmond	12 – Bediako	5 – Richmond	Prudential Center (10,481); Newark, NJ
March 9, 2024; 8:30 p.m., FS1		DePaul	W 86–62	20–11 (13–7)	28 – Davis	7 – Davis	9 – Dawes	Prudential Center (9,419); Newark, NJ
Big East tournament
March 14, 2024; 2:30 p.m., FS1	(4)	vs. (5) St. John's; Quarterfinals	L 72–91	20–12	22 – Dawes	6 – Davis	9 – Richmond	Madison Square Garden (19,812); New York City, NY
National Invitation Tournament
March 20, 2024; 7:00 p.m., ESPN2	(1)	Saint Joseph's; First Round - Seton Hall Bracket	W 75–72 ^{OT}	21–12	26 – Dawes	11 – Davis	5 – Richmond	Walsh Gymnasium (1,233); South Orange, NJ
March 23, 2024; 11:30 a.m., ESPN2	(1)	North Texas; Second Round - Seton Hall Bracket	W 72–58	22–12	18 – Davis	15 – Richmond	6 – Richmond	Walsh Gymnasium (1,204); South Orange, NJ
March 27, 2024; 7:00 p.m., ESPN2	(1)	UNLV; Quarterfinals - Seton Hall Bracket	W 91–68	23–12	21 – Dawes	7 – Davis	10 – Richmond	Walsh Gymnasium (1,316); South Orange, NJ
April 2, 2024; 9:30 p.m., ESPN2	(1)	vs. (4) Georgia; Semifinals	W 84–67	24–12	20 – Dawes	9 – Davis	6 – Richmond	Hinkle Fieldhouse; Indianapolis, IN
April 4, 2024; 7:00 pm, ESPN	(1)	vs. (1) Indiana State; Championship	W 79–77	25–12	24 – Dawes	13 – Richmond	5 – Richmond	Hinkle Fieldhouse (9,100); Indianapolis, IN
*Non-conference game. ^{#}Rankings from AP Poll. (#) Tournament seedings in parentheses. All times are in Eastern Time.

== Rankings ==
Ranking movements Legend: ██ Increase in ranking ██ Decrease in ranking — = Not ranked RV = Received votes
	Week																				
Poll	Pre	1	2	3	4	5	6	7	8	9	10	11	12	13	14	15	16	17	18	19	Final
AP	—	—	—	—	—	—	—	—	—	—	RV	RV	NV	NV	NV	NV	NV	NV	NV	NV	RV
Coaches		—	—	—	—	—	—	—	—	—	RV	RV	NV	NV	NV	NV	NV	NV	NV	NV	RV
