= Tristen Newton =

American basketball player (born 2001)

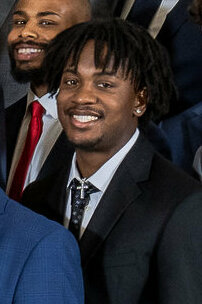
- Newton at the White House in 2023

No. 13 – Stockton Kings
- Position: Point guard / shooting guard
- League: NBA G League

Personal information
- Born: April 26, 2001 (age 25) Pensacola, Florida, U.S.
- Listed height: 6 ft 4 in (1.93 m)
- Listed weight: 202 lb (92 kg)

Career information
- High school: Burges (El Paso, Texas)
- College: East Carolina (2019–2022); UConn (2022–2024)
- NBA draft: 2024: 2nd round, 49th overall pick
- Drafted by: Indiana Pacers
- Playing career: 2024–present

Career history
- 2024–2025: Indiana Pacers
- 2024–2025: →Indiana Mad Ants
- 2025: Minnesota Timberwolves
- 2025: →Iowa Wolves
- 2025–2026: Iowa Wolves
- 2026: Houston Rockets
- 2026: →Rio Grande Valley Vipers
- 2026–present: Stockton Kings

Career highlights
- All-NBA G League First Team (2026); 2× NCAA champion (2023, 2024); NCAA Final Four Most Outstanding Player (2024); Consensus first-team All-American (2024); Bob Cousy Award (2024); First-team All-Big East (2024); Second-team All-AAC (2022)
- Stats at NBA.com
- Stats at Basketball Reference

Tristen Jamal Newton (born April 26, 2001) is an American professional basketball player for the Stockton Kings of the NBA G League. He played college basketball for the East Carolina Pirates and with the UConn Huskies where he won both the 2023 and 2024 national championships. Newton was selected by the Indiana Pacers with the 49th overall pick in the 2024 NBA draft. He has also played for the Minnesota Timberwolves.

== High school career ==
Newton played at Burges High School in El Paso, Texas, where his team routinely traveled great distances to play top teams in the large metro areas of Texas. Newton scored 3,266 points in high school and led the state in scoring as a senior at 37.2 points per game.

== College career ==
Newton found success at East Carolina, entering the starting lineup as a freshman and averaging 11 points and 3.7 assists per game. He set the Pirates' program record for assists in a season by a freshman. He improved for his next two seasons, culminating in a junior season where he averaged 17.7 points, 4.8 rebounds and 5 assists per game. He was named to the All-American Athletic Conference (AAC) second team at the close of the season.

Following the dismissal of his coach Joe Dooley after the 2021–22 season, Newton decided to transfer from East Carolina. He heard from over 30 schools after putting his name in the NCAA transfer portal, ultimately choosing the University of Connecticut (UConn), where coach Dan Hurley saw his playmaking as a missing piece for his Big East Conference team. Newton earned the starting point guard role and became the second player in program history to record two triple-doubles, joining Shabazz Napier. At the close of the season, Newton helped lead the Huskies to the sixth Final Four in school history and later, with a double-double, to UConn's fifth NCAA championship in 2023.

Newton returned to the program for the 2023–24 season after initially declaring for the 2023 NBA draft. During a game against Manhattan, Newton notched his third triple-double of his career with the Huskies, becoming the first player in program history to do so. He notched his fourth triple-double of his career against Villanova, becoming the first power conference player to have four or more triple-doubles since Shaquille O'Neal recorded six. In the NCAA tournament, he led the Huskies to back-to-back championships, was named the Most Outstanding Player (MOP) of the tournament, and became a member of the Huskies of Honor.

== Professional career ==
=== Indiana Pacers / Mad Ants (2024–2025) ===
On June 27, 2024, Newton was selected with the 49th overall pick by the Indiana Pacers in the 2024 NBA draft and on July 27, he signed a two-way contract with them. However, On January 1, 2025, he was waived by the Pacers.

=== Minnesota Timberwolves / Iowa Wolves (2025–2026) ===
On January 3, 2025, Newton was claimed off waivers by the Minnesota Timberwolves, retaining his two-way contract status. In three appearances for Minnesota, Newton averaged no points, 1.3 rebounds, and 0.3 assists. On October 18, Newton was waived by Minnesota after losing the final roster battle to Johnny Juzang. On November 6, 2025, Newton was named to the Iowa Wolves opening night roster.

=== Houston Rockets / Rio Grande Valley Vipers (2026) ===
On January 3, 2026, Newton signed a two-way contract with the Houston Rockets, splitting time with their NBA G League affiliate the Rio Grande Valley Vipers. He appeared in only one game for Houston, recording 12 points, three rebounds, and one steal in a 132–101 victory over the Memphis Grizzlies on April 12. Newton was waived by the Rockets on August 26, following the signing of Rafael Castro.

=== Stockton Kings (2026–present) ===
Newton was released by the Sacramento Kings on October 18, 2026.

== Career statistics ==
Legend
| GP | Games played | GS | Games started | MPG | Minutes per game |
| FG% | Field goal percentage | 3P% | 3-point field goal percentage | FT% | Free throw percentage |
| RPG | Rebounds per game | APG | Assists per game | SPG | Steals per game |
| BPG | Blocks per game | PPG | Points per game | **Bold** | Career high |

=== NBA ===
| Year | Team | GP | GS | MPG | FG% | 3P% | FT% | RPG | APG | SPG | BPG | PPG |
|---|---|---|---|---|---|---|---|---|---|---|---|---|
| 2024–25 | Indiana | **5** | 0 | 1.6 | .167 | .000 | **1.000** | .0 | .2 | .0 | .0 | .6 |
| 2024–25 | Minnesota | 3 | 0 | 2.7 | .000 | – | – | 1.3 | **.3** | .3 | .0 | .0 |
| 2025–26 | Houston | 1 | 0 | **12.0** | **.444** | **.440** | .667 | **3.0** | .0 | **1.0** | .0 | **12.0** |
| Career | | 9 | 0 | 3.1 | .294 | .250 | .750 | .8 | .2 | .2 | .0 | 1.7 |

=== College ===
| Year | Team | GP | GS | MPG | FG% | 3P% | FT% | RPG | APG | SPG | BPG | PPG |
|---|---|---|---|---|---|---|---|---|---|---|---|---|
| 2019–20 | East Carolina | 31 | 19 | 29.9 | .390 | .324 | .802 | 4.5 | 3.7 | 1.2 | **.3** | 11.0 |
| 2020–21 | East Carolina | 17 | 16 | 31.5 | .348 | .262 | **.895** | 4.3 | 4.2 | 1.2 | **.3** | 8.7 |
| 2021–22 | East Carolina | 30 | 30 | **34.8** | **.435** | .333 | .879 | 4.8 | 5.0 | **1.4** | **.3** | **17.7** |
| 2022–23 | UConn | 39 | 38 | 28.8 | .374 | **.366** | .816 | 4.5 | 4.7 | 1.1 | **.3** | 10.1 |
| 2023–24 | UConn | **40** | **40** | 33.2 | .415 | .321 | .808 | **6.6** | **6.2** | .9 | **.3** | 15.1 |
| Career | | 157 | 143 | 31.6 | .402 | .327 | .831 | 5.1 | 4.9 | 1.2 | .3 | 12.8 |

== Personal life ==
Newton's older brother, Jawaun, played college basketball for Evansville and Southern Illinois. He is a cousin of football players Aaron and Alvin Jones.
