= 2023–24 Marquette Golden Eagles men's basketball team =

American college basketball season

2023–24 Marquette Golden Eagles men's basketball
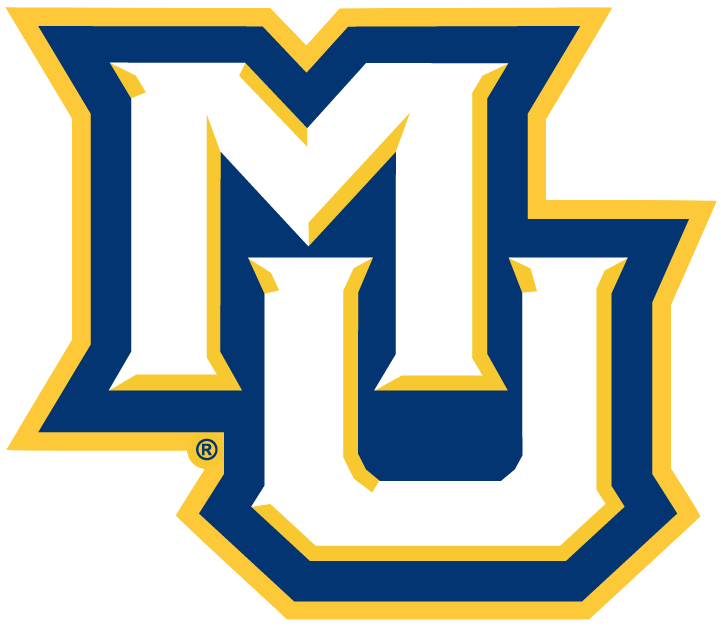

NCAA tournament, Sweet Sixteen
- Conference: Big East Conference

Ranking
- Coaches: No. 11
- AP: No. 12
- Record: 27–10 (14–6 Big East)
- Head coach: Shaka Smart (3rd season)
- Assistant coaches: Neill Berry (3rd season); Cody Hatt (3rd season); DeAndre Haynes (3rd season)
- Home arena: Fiserv Forum (Capacity: 17,341)

2023–24 Big East men's basketball standings
	Conf.				Overall
Team	W		L	PCT	W		L	PCT
No. 1 UConn †	18	–	2	.900	37	–	3	.925
No. 13 Creighton	14	–	6	.700	25	–	10	.714
No. 12 Marquette	14	–	6	.700	27	–	10	.730
Seton Hall	13	–	7	.650	25	–	12	.676
St. John's	11	–	9	.550	20	–	13	.606
Villanova	10	–	10	.500	18	–	16	.529
Providence	10	–	10	.500	21	–	14	.600
Butler	9	–	11	.450	18	–	15	.545
Xavier	9	–	11	.450	16	–	18	.471
Georgetown	2	–	18	.100	9	–	23	.281
DePaul	0	–	20	.000	3	–	29	.094
† 2024 Big East tournament winner Rankings from AP Poll

The 2023–24 Marquette Golden Eagles men's basketball team represented Marquette University during the 2023–24 NCAA Division I men's basketball season. The team was led by third-year head coach Shaka Smart and played their home games at Fiserv Forum in Milwaukee, Wisconsin as a member of the Big East Conference.

The Marquette Golden Eagles men's basketball team drew an average home attendance of 16,307 in 16 games in 2023-24, the 8th highest in college basketball.

== Previous season ==
The Golden Eagles finished the 2022–23 season 29–7, 17–3 in Big East play to win the regular season championship. They defeated St. John's, UConn, and Xavier to win the Big East tournament. As a result, they received the conference's automatic bid to the NCAA tournament as the No. 2 seed in the East region. They defeated Vermont in the First Round before losing to Michigan State in the Second Round of the tournament.

== Offseason ==
=== Departures ===
Name	Number	Pos.	Height	Weight	Year	Hometown	Reason for departure
Emarion Ellis	2	G	6'5"	200	Sophomore	Davenport, IA	Transferred to Bradley
Zach Wrightsil	10	F	6'7"	215	GS Senior	Prosper, TX	Graduate transferred to California Baptist
Olivier-Maxence Prosper	12	F	6'8"	230	Sophomore	Montreal, QC	Declare for 2023 NBA draft
Caleb Kozinski	25	G	6'1"	170	Freshman	Milwaukee, WI	Walk-on; transferred
Keeyan Itejere	40	F	6'9"	215	RS Freshman	Knightdale, NC	Transferred to Northern Kentucky
Michael Kennedy	42	F	6'6"	190	RS Junior	Mequon, WI	Walk-on; didn't return

=== Recruiting classes ===
==== 2023 recruiting class ====
College recruiting information
Name	Hometown	School	Height	Weight	Commit date
Tre Norman #23 PG	Worcester, MA	Worcester Academy	6 ft 3 in (1.91 m)	190 lb (86 kg)	Sep 6, 2022
Tre Norman #23 PG	Recruit ratings: Scout: Rivals: 247Sports: ESPN: (82)				
Alassane Amadou #27 C	Philadelphia, PA	Chestnut Hill Academy	6 ft 4 in (1.93 m)	185 lb (84 kg)	Aug 18, 2022
Alassane Amadou #27 C	Recruit ratings: Scout: Rivals: 247Sports: ESPN: (82)				
Zaide Lowery #33 SG	Springfield, MO	La Lumiere School	6 ft 3 in (1.91 m)	170 lb (77 kg)	Apr 19, 2022
Zaide Lowery #33 SG	Recruit ratings: Scout: Rivals: 247Sports: ESPN: (81)				
Overall recruit ranking: Rivals: 14 247Sports: 23 ESPN: 17
Note: In many cases, Scout, Rivals, 247Sports, On3, and ESPN may conflict in their listings of height and weight.; In these cases, the average was taken. ESPN grades are on a 100-point scale.; Sources: "2023 Marquette Basketball Commitments". Rivals.; "2023 Team Ranking". Rivals.

==== 2024 recruiting class ====
College recruiting information (2024)
Name	Hometown	School	Height	Weight	Commit date
Damarius Owens #8 SF	Hudson, OH	Western Reserve Academy	6 ft 6 in (1.98 m)	190 lb (86 kg)	Feb 15, 2023
Damarius Owens #8 SF	Recruit ratings: Scout: Rivals: 247Sports: ESPN: (82)				
Royce Parham; PF	Pittsburgh, PA	North Hills High School	6 ft 8 in (2.03 m)	210 lb (95 kg)	Apr 26, 2023
Royce Parham; PF	Recruit ratings: Scout: Rivals: 247Sports: ESPN: (NR)				
Overall recruit ranking: Rivals: 14 247Sports: 23 ESPN: 17
Note: In many cases, Scout, Rivals, 247Sports, On3, and ESPN may conflict in their listings of height and weight.; In these cases, the average was taken. ESPN grades are on a 100-point scale.; Sources: "2024 Marquette Basketball Commitments". Rivals.; "2024 Team Ranking". Rivals.

== Roster ==
2023–24 Marquette Golden Eagles men's basketball team
Players
Coaches

Pos.	#	Name	Height	Weight	Year	Previous school	Hometown
G	1	Kam Jones	6 ft 5 in (1.96 m)	200 lb (91 kg)	Jr	Evangelical Christian	Cordova, TN
G	2	Chase Ross	6 ft 5 in (1.96 m)	200 lb (91 kg)	So	Cushing Academy	Dallas, TX
G	4	Stevie Mitchell	6 ft 3 in (1.91 m)	195 lb (88 kg)	Jr	Wilson HS	Reading, PA
G	5	Tre Norman	6 ft 4 in (1.93 m)	205 lb (93 kg)	Fr	Worcester Academy	Boston, MA
G	10	Zaide Lowery	6 ft 5 in (1.96 m)	195 lb (88 kg)	Fr	La Lumiere School	Springfield, MO
G	11	Tyler Kolek	6 ft 3 in (1.91 m)	200 lb (91 kg)	RS Jr	George Mason	Cumberland, RI
F	12	Ben Gold	6 ft 11 in (2.11 m)	235 lb (107 kg)	So	NBA Global Academy	Wellington, New Zealand
F	13	Oso Ighodaro	6 ft 9 in (2.06 m)	225 lb (102 kg)	RS Jr	Desert Vista HS	Chandler, AZ
F	21	Al Amadou	6 ft 9 in (2.06 m)	200 lb (91 kg)	Fr	Chestnut Hill Academy	Philadelphia, PA
G	22	Sean Jones	5 ft 10 in (1.78 m)	185 lb (84 kg)	So	Lincoln HS	Gahanna, OH
F	23	David Joplin	6 ft 8 in (2.03 m)	220 lb (100 kg)	Jr	Brookfield Central HS	Brookfield, WI
G	41	Jonah Lucas (W)	6 ft 1 in (1.85 m)	175 lb (79 kg)	So	Harrison HS	West Lafayette, IN
G	51	RJ Walson (W)	6 ft 0 in (1.83 m)	200 lb (91 kg)	RS Jr	Perspectives Math & Science Academy	Chicago, IL
G	54	Jake Ciardo (W)	6 ft 2 in (1.88 m)	175 lb (79 kg)	RS So	Germantown HS	Germantown, WI
G	55	Cameron Brown (W)	6 ft 1 in (1.85 m)	215 lb (98 kg)	Jr	John Paul II HS	Plano, TX

Head coach

- Shaka Smart (Kenyon)

Assistant coach(es)

- Neill Berry (Southeastern Louisiana)
- Cody Hatt (Norwich)
- DeAndre Haynes (Kent State)

Legend

- (C) Team captain
- (S) Suspended
- (I) Ineligible
- (W) Walk-on
- Injured
- Current redshirt

Roster

== Schedule and results ==
Date time, TV	Rank^{#}	Opponent^{#}	Result	Record	High points	High rebounds	High assists	Site (attendance) city, state
Non-conference regular season
November 6, 2023*; 7:30 p.m., FS1	No. 5	Northern Illinois	W 92–70	1–0	20 – K. Jones	7 – Tied	4 – Tied	Fiserv Forum (16,352); Milwaukee, WI
November 10, 2023*; 7:30 p.m., FS1	No. 5	Rider	W 95–65	2–0	23 – K. Jones	11 – Ighodaro	6 – Tied	Fiserv Forum (14,201); Milwaukee, WI
November 14, 2023*; 7:00 p.m., FS1	No. 4	at No. 23 Illinois; Gavitt Tipoff Games	W 71–64	3–0	24 – Kolek	8 – Ighodaro	4 – Kolek	State Farm Center (15,544); Champaign, IL
November 20, 2023*; 10:30 p.m., ESPN2	No. 4	vs. UCLA; Maui Invitational quarterfinals	W 71–69	4–0	19 – Joplin	5 – Kolek	9 – Kolek	Stan Sheriff Center (4,936); Honolulu, HI
November 21, 2023*; 7:00 p.m., ESPN	No. 4	vs. No. 1 Kansas; Maui Invitational semifinals	W 73–59	5–0	21 – Ighodaro	9 – Ighodaro	4 – Kolek	Stan Sheriff Center (5,257); Honolulu, HI
November 22, 2023*; 4:00 p.m., ESPN	No. 4	vs. No. 2 Purdue; Maui Invitational championship	L 75–78	5–1	22 – Kolek	7 – Kolek	6 – Kolek	Stan Sheriff Center (5,164); Honolulu, HI
November 28, 2023*; 8:00 p.m., FS1	No. 3	Southern	W 93–56	6–1	16 – Kolek	8 – Gold	3 – Tied	Fiserv Forum (13,607); Milwaukee, WI
December 2, 2023*; 11:30 a.m., FOX	No. 3	at Wisconsin; Rivalry	L 64–75	6–2	19 – K. Jones	5 – Ighodaro	6 – Kolek	Kohl Center (17,071); Madison, WI
December 6, 2023*; 7:00 p.m., FS1	No. 8	No. 12 Texas; Big East–Big 12 Battle	W 86–65	7–2	28 – Kolek	8 – Kolek	6 – Kolek	Fiserv Forum (16,733); Milwaukee, WI
December 9, 2023*; 8:00 p.m., FOX	No. 8	Notre Dame	W 78–59	8–2	20 – Ighodaro	8 – Ross	7 – Kolek	Fiserv Forum (17,519); Milwaukee, WI
December 14, 2023*; 7:00 p.m., FS1	No. 7	St. Thomas (MN)	W 84–79	9–2	21 – Ighodaro	8 – Ighodaro	10 – Kolek	Fiserv Forum (14,950); Milwaukee, WI
Big East regular season
December 19, 2023; 7:30 p.m., FS1	No. 6	at Providence	L 57–72	9–3 (0–1)	21 – Kolek	9 – Kolek	5 – Kolek	Amica Mutual Pavilion (12,108); Providence, RI
December 22, 2023; 6:00 p.m., FS1	No. 6	Georgetown	W 81–51	10–3 (1–1)	20 – Joplin	9 – Joplin	10 – Kolek	Fiserv Forum (16,930); Milwaukee, WI
December 30, 2023; 1:00 p.m., CBS	No. 10	No. 22 Creighton	W 72–67	11–3 (2–1)	15 – Kolek	16 – Ighodaro	8 – Kolek	Fiserv Forum (18,086); Milwaukee, WI
January 6, 2024; 11:00 a.m., CBSSN	No. 7	at Seton Hall	L 75–78	11–4 (2–2)	22 – Ighodaro	8 – Ighodaro	6 – Kolek	Prudential Center (10,481); Newark, NJ
January 10, 2024; 8:00 p.m., CBSSN	No. 11т	Butler	L 62–69	11–5 (2–3)	20 – K. Jones	9 – Ighodaro	8 – Kolek	Fiserv Forum (14,858); Milwaukee, WI
January 15, 2024; 1:30 p.m., FOX	No. 17	Villanova	W 87–74	12–5 (3–3)	22 – K. Jones	7 – Ighodaro	11 – Kolek	Fiserv Forum (17,018); Milwaukee, WI
January 20, 2024; 11:00 a.m., FOX	No. 17	at St. John's	W 73–72	13–5 (4–3)	17 – Ighodaro	6 – Tied	11 – Kolek	Madison Square Garden (12,214); New York, NY
January 24, 2024; 8:00 p.m., CBSSN	No. 14	at DePaul	W 86–73	14–5 (5–3)	22 – Kolek	12 – Ighodaro	7 – Kolek	Wintrust Arena (6,050); Chicago, IL
January 27, 2024; 12:00 p.m., FS1	No. 14	Seton Hall	W 75–57	15–5 (6–3)	21 – Ighodaro	7 – Ighodaro	11 – Kolek	Fiserv Forum (17,751); Milwaukee, WI
January 30, 2024; 6:00 p.m., FS1	No. 9	at Villanova	W 85–80	16–5 (7–3)	32 – Kolek	9 – Mitchell	9 – Kolek	Finneran Pavilion (6,501); Villanova, PA
February 3, 2024; 1:00 p.m., FS1	No. 9	at Georgetown	W 91–57	17–5 (8–3)	31 – K. Jones	10 – Ighodaro	8 – Kolek	Capital One Arena (10,563); Washington, D.C.
February 10, 2024; 5:00 p.m., FS1	No. 7	St. John's	W 86–75	18–5 (9–3)	27 – Kolek	9 – Ighodaro	13 – Kolek	Fiserv Forum (18,095); Milwaukee, WI
February 13, 2024; 5:30 p.m., FS1	No. 4	at Butler	W 78–72	19–5 (10–3)	27 – Kolek	10 – Ighodaro	4 – Ighodaro	Hinkle Fieldhouse (8,344); Indianapolis, IN
February 17, 2024; 2:00 p.m., FOX	No. 4	at No. 1 UConn	L 53–81	19–6 (10–4)	15 – K. Jones	4 – Tied	3 – Tied	XL Center (15,684); Hartford, CT
February 21, 2024; 8:00 p.m., FS1	No. 7	DePaul	W 105–71	20–6 (11–4)	34 – K. Jones	9 – Ighodaro	18 – Kolek	Fiserv Forum (14,100); Milwaukee, WI
February 25, 2024; 4:00 p.m., FS1	No. 7	Xavier	W 88–64	21–6 (12–4)	34 – K. Jones	7 – Kolek	10 – Kolek	Fiserv Forum (17,540); Milwaukee, WI
February 28, 2024; 6:00 p.m., FS1	No. 5	Providence	W 91–69	22–6 (13–4)	17 – K. Jones	7 – Ighodaro	6 – Kolek	Fiserv Forum (15,341); Milwaukee, WI
March 2, 2024; 1:30 p.m., FOX	No. 5	at No. 12 Creighton	L 75–89	22–7 (13–5)	23 – K. Jones	9 – Mitchell	3 – K. Jones	CHI Health Center Omaha (18,011); Omaha, NE
March 6, 2024; 7:30 p.m., FS1	No. 8	No. 2 UConn	L 67–74	22–8 (13–6)	18 – K. Jones	9 – Mitchell	4 – Mitchell	Fiserv Forum (17,837); Milwaukee, WI
March 9, 2024; 4:00 p.m., FOX	No. 8	at Xavier	W 86–80	23–8 (14–6)	30 – K. Jones	5 – Tied	9 – K. Jones	Cintas Center (10,380); Cincinnati, OH
Big East tournament
March 14, 2024; 8:30 p.m., FS1	(3) No. 10	vs. (6) Villanova; Quarterfinals	W 71–65 ^{OT}	24–8	18 – K. Jones	8 – Joplin	4 – Tied	Madison Square Garden (19,812); New York, NY
March 15, 2024; 7:00 p.m., FS1	(3) No. 10	vs. (7) Providence; Semifinals	W 79–68	25–8	23 – K. Jones	8 – Mitchell	5 – K. Jones	Madison Square Garden (19,812); New York, NY
March 16, 2024; 5:30 p.m., FS1	(3) No. 10	vs. (1) No. 2 UConn; Championship	L 57–73	25–9	13 – K. Jones	8 – K. Jones	4 – Tied	Madison Square Garden (19,812); New York, NY
NCAA Tournament
March 22, 2024*; 1:00 p.m., TBS	(2 S) No. 8	vs. (15 S) Western Kentucky; First Round	W 87–69	26–9	28 – K. Jones	11 – Joplin	10 – Kolek	Gainbridge Fieldhouse; Indianapolis, IN
March 24, 2024*; 11:10 a.m., CBS	(2 S) No. 8	vs. (10 S) Colorado; Second Round	W 81–77	27–9	21 – Kolek	5 – Tied	11 – Kolek	Gainbridge Fieldhouse; Indianapolis, IN
March 29, 2024*; 6:09 p.m., CBS	(2 S) No. 8	vs. (11 S) NC State; Sweet Sixteen	L 58–67	27–10	20 – K. Jones	10 – Tied	3 – Tied	American Airlines Center (18,751); Dallas, TX
*Non-conference game. ^{#}Rankings from AP Poll. (#) Tournament seedings in parentheses. S=South region. All times are in Central Time.

== Rankings ==
Ranking movements Legend: ██ Increase in ranking ██ Decrease in ranking т = Tied with team above or below
	Week																				
Poll	Pre	1	2	3	4	5	6	7	8	9	10	11	12	13	14	15	16	17	18	19	Final
AP	5	4	4	3	8	7	6	10	7	11т	17	14	9	7	4	7	5	8	10	8	12
Coaches	7	5	5	3	7	7	6	8	7	12	18	15	10	7	4	8	5	9	10	8	11
