= Burges High School =

Public school in Texas, United States

Location
- 7800 Edgemere Boulevard; El Paso, Texas 79925; United States; 31.7845°N 106.3847°W

Information
- Type: Public
- Established: 1955
- Principal: Jason Yturralde
- Staff: 87.13 (FTE)
- Grades: 9-12
- Enrollment: 1,417 (2023–2024)
- Student to teacher ratio: 16.26
- Colors: Purple and Gold
- Mascot: Mustang
- Website: www.episd.org/o/buhs

Burges High School in El Paso, Texas, United States, is a comprehensive high school in the El Paso Independent School District. It is located in the Cielo Vista neighborhood on the near east side of El Paso, north of the large shopping center Cielo Vista Mall and south of El Paso International Airport, and is the only El Paso Independent School District high school in East El Paso.

== History ==
The school cost $2 million in 1955 to build. The school's original plan included only 70 classrooms, a cafeteria that could hold up to 500 people, an indoor rifle range, a field house, and a combined gymnasium and auditorium. The first graduating class was in January 1956.

The school, which was named for William H. Burges, a prominent local attorney of the late 19th and early 20th centuries, serves portions of near East, East-Central and South-Central El Paso. Its feeder schools are Ross Middle School and MacArthur Elementary-Intermediate School.

MacArthur is the only K-8 primary school remaining from a long trend in the district of separating pre-kindergarteners to fifth graders into elementary schools, sixth-to-eighth-graders into middle schools, and ninth-to-twelfth-graders into high schools, which began circa 1970. The elementary schools in the Burges feeder pattern include Bonham, Cielo Vista (which graduate into MacArthur), Hawkins, Hillside and Hughey (which graduate into Ross).

Most of the Burges attendance zone lies between Interstate 10 on the south, the Fort Bliss main post and El Paso International Airport on the north, the Patriot Freeway (US 54) on the west and the boundary of the Ysleta Independent School District on the east. However, a portion of South-Central El Paso is zoned for Burges which is bordered roughly by Interstate 10 on the north, railroad tracks running north of El Paso Drive on the south, Raynolds Street on the west, and on the east, an industrial area just north of the three-way intersection of Delta Drive, Trowbridge Drive and North Loop Road which extends into the Ysleta Independent School District.

The portion of the Burges attendance zone lying south of Interstate 10 is zoned for Hawkins Elementary west of Trowbridge and Hughey Elementary east of it, and Ross Middle overall. The eastern half of the Fort Bliss main post, which is zoned for Ross Middle and Hughey Elementary, which lie at the southeastern edge of the main post, is zoned for Austin High for grades nine to twelve.

Burges hosts a teaching and child development magnet program. Burges also offered American Sign Language (ASL) classes, the only high school in El Paso to do so. The program ended in 2022.

== Extracurricular ==
- Theater
- Band
- JROTC
- BTEP
- Chess club
- Math club
- Choir
- Dance Company
- Speech and Debate Team
- Orchestra
- Volleyball
- Football
- Guitar
- Swimming
- Boys' basketball
- Girls' basketball
- Girls' soccer
- Boys' soccer
- Cheerleading
- Track and field
- Wrestling team
  - Texas State Champions 1977 1979 1980 1982
  - Texas State Runner Up 1975 1976 1978 1981 1991 1993
- Yearbook staff (Hoofbeats)
- Newspaper (Stampede)
- Baseball
- Tennis

By 1995 there was a Japanese language summer academy held at Burges High.

In 2021, the Burges Band received sweepstakes for U.I.L Marching and Sight Reading Contests.

== Notable alumni ==
- Joe Devance (2001), professional basketball player
- Veronica Escobar (1987), politician
- Randy Fuller (1962), American rock singer, songwriter, and bass player best known for his work in the popular 60s rock group the Bobby Fuller Four
- James T. Hill (1964), United States Army General
- Aaron Jones (2013), running back for the Minnesota Vikings
- Bill Macatee, sports broadcaster
- Tristen Newton (2019), basketball player
- John D. Olivas (1984), NASA astronaut
- Jose Arriaga Rodríguez (1996), professional wrestler
- Matt Simon, football coach
- John Skelton (2006), NFL Quarterback (Free Agent)
