= Trey Alexander =

American basketball player (born 2003)

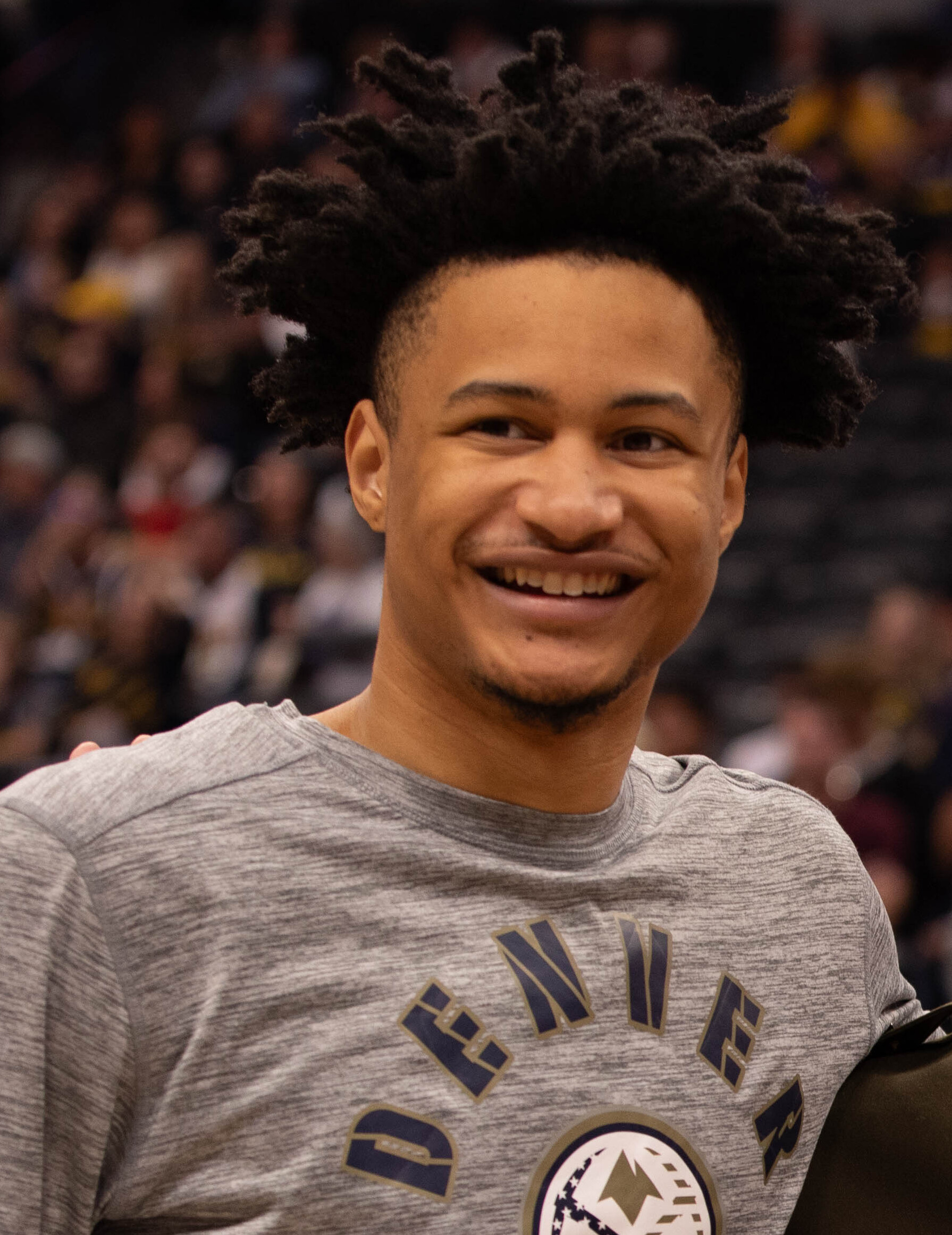
- Alexander with the Denver Nuggets in 2024

Free agent
- Position: Shooting guard

Personal information
- Born: May 2, 2003 (age 23) Oklahoma City, Oklahoma, U.S.
- Listed height: 6 ft 5 in (1.96 m)
- Listed weight: 185 lb (84 kg)

Career information
- High school: Heritage Hall (Oklahoma City, Oklahoma)
- College: Creighton (2021–2024)
- NBA draft: 2024: undrafted
- Playing career: 2024–present

Career history
- 2024–2025: Denver Nuggets
- 2024–2025: →Grand Rapids Gold
- 2025–2026: New Orleans Pelicans
- 2025–2026: →Birmingham Squadron
- 2026: Salt Lake City Stars

Career highlights
- NBA G League Rookie Of The Year (2025); All-NBA G League Third Team (2025); NBA G League All-Rookie Team (2025); Second-team All-Big East (2024); Big East All-Freshman team (2022)
- Stats at NBA.com
- Stats at Basketball Reference

Trey Alexander (born May 2, 2003) is an American professional basketball player who last played for the Salt Lake City Stars of the NBA G League. He played college basketball for the Creighton Bluejays.

== Early life and high school career ==
Alexander grew up in Oklahoma City, Oklahoma, and attended Heritage Hall School. He was named the Oklahoma Gatorade Player of the Year after averaging 23.6 points, 8.7 rebounds, four assists, and 2.1 steals per game as a senior. Alexander was rated a four-star recruit. In November 2020, he committed to playing college basketball for Auburn over offers from Arkansas, Georgia, Oklahoma, Ole Miss, and Kansas. Alexander decommitted from the program at the end of his senior season. He later signed to play for Creighton.

== College career ==
Alexander played in all 35 of Creighton's games during his freshman season and was named to the Big East Conference All-Freshman team after averaging 7.4 points, 3.7 rebounds, and 2.5 assists per game. He became the Bluejays' starting point guard after Ryan Nembhard suffered a season-ending injury. Alexander averaged 11.6 points, 4.3 assists, and four assists during the final eight games of the season.

Alexander entered his sophomore season as Creighton's starting shooting guard.

== Professional career ==
=== Denver Nuggets (2024–2025) ===
After going undrafted in the 2024 NBA draft, Alexander joined the Denver Nuggets for the 2024 NBA Summer League and on July 10, 2024, he signed a two-way contract with the team.

=== New Orleans Pelicans (2025–2026) ===
On July 3, 2025, Alexander signed with the New Orleans Pelicans on a two-way contract.

=== Salt Lake City Stars (2026) ===
On July 7, 2026, Alexander signed with the Utah Jazz on a two-way contract.

== Personal life ==
Alexander is the son of Steve and Pamela Alexander. He has one sister. His uncle, DeAngelo Alexander, played basketball at University of Oklahoma and UNC Charlotte his other uncle, Xavier Alexander, played basketball at George Washington University. Alexander and Mike Conley Jr. are cousins on his mother's side.

== Career statistics ==
Legend
GP	Games played	GS	Games started	MPG	Minutes per game
FG%	Field goal percentage	3P%	3-point field goal percentage	FT%	Free throw percentage
RPG	Rebounds per game	APG	Assists per game	SPG	Steals per game
BPG	Blocks per game	PPG	Points per game	**Bold**	Career high

=== NBA ===
Year	Team	GP	GS	MPG	FG%	3P%	FT%	RPG	APG	SPG	BPG	PPG
2024–25	Denver	**24**	0	4.9	.317	.176	**.750**	.5	.5	.1	.0	1.3
2025–26	New Orleans	9	0	**12.3**	**.514**	**.500**	.600	**1.2**	**1.0**	**.7**	**.2**	**5.2**
Career		33	0	6.9	.410	.310	.667	.7	.6	.2	.1	2.4

=== College ===
Year	Team	GP	GS	MPG	FG%	3P%	FT%	RPG	APG	SPG	BPG	PPG
2021–22	Creighton	35	13	26.6	.422	.281	.818	3.7	2.5	.7	.3	7.4
2022–23	Creighton	**37**	**37**	32.1	**.447**	**.410**	**.824**	4.2	2.6	**1.1**	**.5**	13.6
2023–24	Creighton	35	35	**37.3**	.446	.339	**.824**	**5.7**	**4.7**	**1.1**	.4	**17.6**
Career		107	85	32.0	.442	.358	.822	4.6	3.2	1.0	.4	12.9
