= Heritage Hall School =

Prep school in Oklahoma City, Oklahoma, US

Location
- Oklahoma City, Oklahoma 73120; United States; 35.594461°N 97.542151°W

Information
- Type: Private
- Motto: To Learn, To Lead, To Serve
- Established: 1969
- Locale: Suburban
- President: Aaron L. Fetrow
- Faculty: 122
- Grades: PS-12
- Enrollment: 965
- Color: Navy Blue Gold
- Mascot: Charger
- Religious Affiliation: None
- Website: Heritage Hall

Heritage Hall School is a coeducational, college-prep school located in north Oklahoma City, Oklahoma. An independent private school with no religious affiliation, the school is open to students of any race, religion, nationality, or ethnic origin.

Heritage Hall was founded September 8, 1969 in the church basement of All Souls Episcopal Church in Oklahoma City. Heritage Hall was established during the integration of Oklahoma City public schools in response to cross-city busing.

Heritage Hall serves children from preschool through 12th grade, and has about 965 students. Racial diversity in the student body closely matches the Oklahoma state average, with an enrollment of just over 20% of students of color. Each grade in the Upper School has about 90 students.

The current school president, Aaron L. Fetrow, was appointed in 2021.

Heritage Hall's athletic teams are nicknamed the Chargers. The school colors are navy blue and gold. As a member of the Oklahoma Secondary School Activities Association, middle school and high school students are able to participate in more than a dozen competitive sports, from American football to tennis, basketball, swimming, golf, soccer, baseball and softball.

== Accreditation ==
Heritage Hall is accredited by the Independent Schools Association of the Southwest and the Oklahoma Private School Accreditation Commission. Heritage Hall is a member of the National Association of Independent Schools, National Association for College Admission Counseling, Great Plains Association for College Admission Counseling, Association of College Counselors in Independent Schools, and The College Board.

== State championships ==
Heritage Hall has won 102 total state championships in 13 sports and in academic bowl.

During the 2017-18 school year, Heritage Hall won the state championship in five different sports (the most of any school in Oklahoma that year): Football, Boys' Basketball, Boys' Tennis, Girls' Tennis, and Boys' Golf.

Similarly, during the 2014-15 school year, Heritage Hall won the state championship in seven different sports (the most of any school in Oklahoma that year): Football, Boys' Basketball, Baseball, Boys' Golf, Boys' Tennis, Girls' Tennis and Volleyball.

Boys' Basketball (2) – 2015, 2018

Baseball (4 ) – 1999, 2015, 2016, 2021

Cheerleading (4 ) – 1999, 2000, 2001, 2015

Football (8) – 1998, 2008, 2010, 2014, 2015, 2017, 2018, 2022

Boys' Golf (14) – 1976, 1977, 1986, 1987, 1996, 2008, 2010, 2012, 2014, 2015, 2017, 2018, 2019, 2022

Slow Pitch Softball (1) – 1997

Boys' Soccer (6) – 2013, 2014, 2016, 2023, 2024, 2025

Girls' Soccer (1) – 2023

Boys' Tennis (23) – 1978, 1979, 1980, 1981, 1987, 1990, 1991, 1992, 1993, 1994, 1995, 1997, 1998, 2011, 2012, 2014, 2015, 2016, 2017, 2018, 2019, 2022, 2023

Girls' Tennis (23) – 1980, 1982, 1983, 1985, 1986, 1987, 1988, 1989, 1991, 1992, 1994, 1995, 1996, 1999, 2000, 2001, 2003, 2009, 2010, 2011, 2012, 2015, 2018

Boys' Track (5) – 1987, 1988, 1997, 2017, 2023

Volleyball (10) − 1992, 1994, 1995, 1996, 2005, 2006, 2007, 2008, 2013, 2014

Heritage Hall is also home to the most successful, active debate program in Oklahoma, with 18 state championships in policy debate (10 of which have been won since 2004, and most recently in 2018). In June 2020, Heritage Hall's Saif-Ullah Salim '20 and Samuel Ring '21 won the National Speech and Debate Tournament in the policy debate division, widely regarded as the policy debate national championship.

== Notable alumni ==
- Aubrey McClendon (1977), founder and CEO of Chesapeake Energy
- Suzy Amis Cameron (1980), is an American actress, model, author and activist. Co-founder of Muse Global School with sister Rebecca Amis '86
- Anthony Shadid (1986), two-time winner of the Pulitzer Prize and foreign correspondent for the New York Times
- Graham Colton (2000), is a singer/songwriter best known for his hit single "Best Days"
- Wes Welker (2000), current assistant coach for the Miami Dolphins, five-time NFL Pro Bowl wide receiver for the San Diego Chargers, Miami Dolphins, New England Patriots, Denver Broncos and St. Louis Rams; appeared in three Super Bowls with the Patriots and Broncos; also played college football for the Texas Tech Red Raiders
- Mike Turner (2005), politician in the Oklahoma House of Representatives
- Barry J. Sanders (2012), college football running back, played for the Stanford Cardinals and Oklahoma State Cowboys and is also the son of College Football and Pro Football Hall of Famer Barry Sanders. Sanders now holds a leadership position with the Electronic Arts (EA) Madden NFL Partnership.
- Sterling Shepard (2012), NFL wide receiver
- Trey Alexander (2021), NBA player
- Jackson Jobe (2021), MLB player
