= Hassan Diarra =

American basketball player (born 2001)

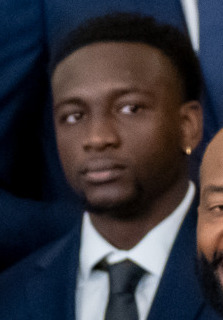
- Diarra in 2023 with UConn

No. 10 – Iraklis Thessaloniki
- Position: Shooting guard / point guard
- League: Greek Basketball League; FIBA Europe Cup

Personal information
- Born: 17 March 2001 (age 25) Queens, New York, U.S.
- Listed height: 6 ft 1.62 in (1.87 m)
- Listed weight: 190 lb (86 kg)

Career information
- High school: Putnam Science Academy (Putnam, Connecticut)
- College: Texas A&M (2020–2022); UConn (2022–2025)
- NBA draft: 2025: undrafted
- Playing career: 2025–present

Career history
- 2025: Maccabi Ra'anana
- 2025–2026: Juventus Utena
- 2026–present: Iraklis Thessaloniki

Career highlights
- 2× NCAA champion (2023, 2024); Big East Sixth Man of the Year (2024)

Hassan Diarra (born March 17, 2001) is an American professional basketball player for Iraklis Thessaloniki of the Greek Basketball League (GBL) and the FIBA Europe Cup. He started his college career with the Texas A&M Aggies before transferring to the UConn Huskies, winning two national championships.

Diarra played at Putnam Science Academy in Putnam, Connecticut, where his team won the National Prep Championship in 2019 and 2020. Diarra scored 1,469 points during his time there, setting the school record.

Diarra committed to Texas A&M as a four star recruit, both starting and coming off the bench as a freshman and averaging 5.8 points, 2.1 rebounds, and 1.7 assists per game. As a sophomore, he continued to play off the bench, averaging 6.2 points, 1.8 rebounds, and 1.4 assists per game as he helped the Aggies reach the NIT championship game.

Following the 2021–22 season, Diarra decided to transfer from Texas A&M to UConn, joining his brother Mamadou, who is the Director of Player Development for the team. During the 2022–23 season, Diarra played off the bench, averaging 2.1 points, 1.3 rebounds, and 1.8 assists per game, while his defensive skills helped the Huskies reach and win the national championship.

During the 2023–24 season, Diarra's role on the team grew as he became the first guard off the bench for the team, averaging 6.1 points, 3.0 rebounds, and 2.4 assists per game. His performance during the season led him to receive the Sixth Man of the Year award. Diarra's performance off the bench during the March Madness tournament helped spark the Huskies to the national championship game, where he hit multiple crucial shots to help the team win their second title in a row.

== Professional career ==
On 10 December 2025, Diarra signed with Juventus Utena of the Lithuanian Basketball League (LKL).

On 30 June 2026, Diarra signed with Iraklis Thessaloniki of the Greek Basketball League (GBL).

== Career statistics ==
Legend
GP	Games played	GS	Games started	MPG	Minutes per game
FG%	Field goal percentage	3P%	3-point field goal percentage	FT%	Free throw percentage
RPG	Rebounds per game	APG	Assists per game	SPG	Steals per game
BPG	Blocks per game	PPG	Points per game	**Bold**	Career high

=== College ===
Year	Team	GP	GS	MPG	FG%	3P%	FT%	RPG	APG	SPG	BPG	PPG
2020–21	Texas A&M	18	6	19.6	.350	.304	.633	2.1	1.7	1.1	.1	5.8
2021–22	Texas A&M	**40**	3	15.4	.371	.327	.718	1.8	1.4	.7	.2	6.2
2022–23	UConn	36	3	12.6	.301	.189	.514	1.3	1.8	.8	.2	2.1
2023–24	UConn	**40**	1	19.4	**.483**	**.357**	.780	3.0	2.4	.8	**.3**	6.1
2024–25	UConn	35	**28**	**27.9**	.421	.288	**.840**	**3.7**	**5.7**	**1.6**	**.3**	**7.7**
Career		169	41	18.8	.400	.306	.730	2.4	2.6	1.0	.2	5.6
