= 2024 NCAA Division I men's basketball championship game =

American collegiate basketball final

2024 NCAA Division I men’s basketball championship game
National championship game
| Purdue Boilermakers | UConn Huskies |
| Big Ten | Big East |
| (34–4) | (36–3) |
|---|---|
| 60 | 75 |
| Head coach: Matt Painter | Head coach: Dan Hurley |
- AP: 3
- Coaches: 3
- AP: 1
- Coaches: 1
| | 1st half | 2nd half | Total |
|---|---|---|---|
| Purdue Boilermakers | 30 | 30 | 60 |
| UConn Huskies | 36 | 39 | 75 |
- Date: April 8, 2024
- Venue: State Farm Stadium, Glendale, Arizona
- MVP: Tristen Newton, UConn
- Favorite: UConn by 6
- Referees: Jeffrey Anderson, Terry Oglesby, Roger Ayers
- Attendance: 74,423
- National anthem: Kahara Hodges

United States TV coverage
- Network: TBS, TNT, and TruTV
- Announcers: Ian Eagle, Bill Raftery, Grant Hill, and Tracy Wolfson

The 2024 NCAA Division I men's basketball championship game was the final game of the 2024 NCAA Division I men's basketball tournament. It determined the national champion for the 2023–24 NCAA Division I men's basketball season and was contested by the Purdue Boilermakers from the Big Ten Conference and the UConn Huskies from the Big East Conference. The game was played on April 8, 2024, at State Farm Stadium in Glendale, Arizona.

The game began with each team holding the lead for short periods of time. After the score was tied at eleven points apiece, UConn took the lead on a shot by Tristen Newton, though later shots by Zach Edey and Braden Smith gave Purdue the lead with eight minutes left in the first half. Field goals afterwards by Newton, Donovan Clingan, and Stephon Castle resulted in a six-point UConn lead at halftime. The lead grew to nine points a short time into the second half and soon expanded to thirteen, though two shots by Edey brought it back to nine for a short time. UConn pulled away after shots by Alex Karaban and Hassan Diarra and the Huskies ultimately led by seventeen with under eight minutes to play. Later in the half, Purdue went on a run of six unanswered points which was ended with two free throws by Newton. Despite three field goals by Edey in the final minutes of the game, UConn's Clingan and Castle scored the final points of the game to make the final score 75–60 in favor of the Huskies.

UConn's victory marked their second consecutive national championship, making them the first team to do so since Florida did so in 2006 and 2007.

== Participants ==
=== Purdue Boilermakers ===
The Boilermakers, representing Purdue University in West Lafayette, Indiana, received a No. 3 ranking in the preseason AP Poll, after having been upset in the previous tournament by the #16 seeded Fairleigh Dickinson University, becoming the second #1 seed to lose in the first round. They won the Maui Invitational championship after victories over No. 11 Gonzaga, No. 7 Tennessee, and No. 4 Marquette. They defeated No. 1 Arizona before entering conference play. The Boilermakers finished Big Ten Conference play with a 17–3 record against conference opponents and were seeded first in the conference tournament, where they were eliminated by Wisconsin in the semifinals.

Purdue was seeded No. 1 in the Midwest Region of the NCAA tournament, where they defeated No. 16 Grambling State in the first round. They beat No. 8 Utah State to make the Sweet Sixteen and there defeated No. 5 Gonzaga. The Boilermakers beat No. 2 Tennessee in the regional final, qualifying them for the Final Four for the first time since 1980. In the national semifinal, they defeated the tournament's Cinderella team, No. 11 NC State, to reach the national championship for the first time since 1969.

=== Connecticut Huskies ===
The Huskies, representing the University of Connecticut in Storrs, Connecticut, entered the season as defending national champions and ranked No. 6 in the preseason AP Poll. They won the Empire Classic championship over No. 15 Texas but suffered their first loss several weeks later against No. 5 Kansas. The Huskies lost their Big East Conference opener against Seton Hall but won all but one of their remaining games to finish with an 18–2 conference record. In the Big East tournament, they were seeded No. 1 and won all three games en route to a championship.

UConn received the No. 1 overall seed in the NCAA tournament and defeated No. 16 Stetson and No. 8 Northwestern in the first and second rounds, respectively. The Sweet Sixteen saw UConn defeat No. 5 San Diego State in a rematch of the 2023 national championship. A win over No. 3 Illinois sent them to the Final Four, where they defeated No. 4 Alabama to reach the national championship.

== Game summary ==
External videos
- Video highlights on YouTube
- Full game broadcast by TBS on YouTube

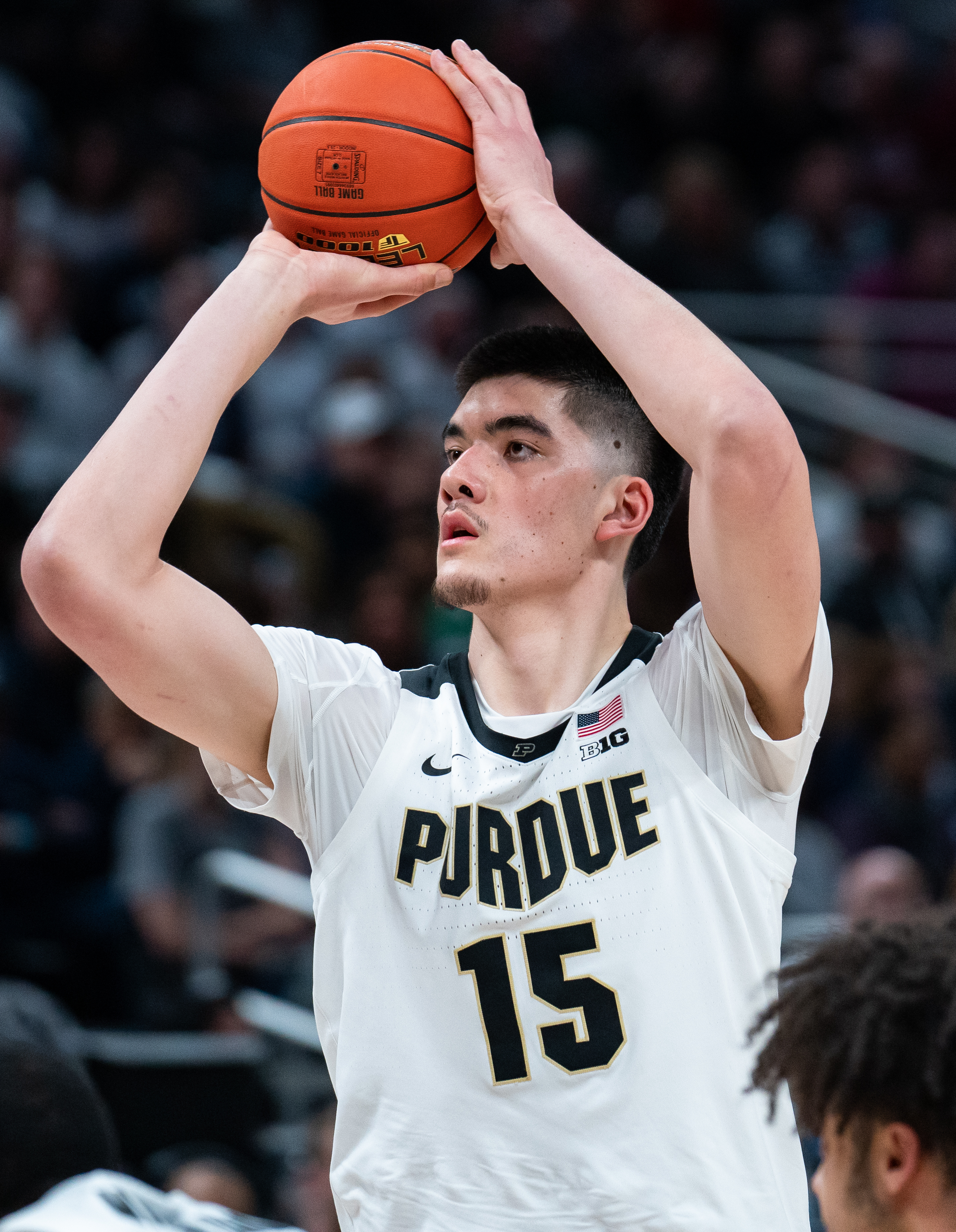
Zach Edey (pictured) led all scorers with 37 points.

Purdue controlled the opening tip-off and scored the first points of the game on a jump shot by Trey Kaufman-Renn one minute later. The teams traded baskets for several minutes before UConn tied the game at five with a pair of free throws by Tristen Newton; a jumper by Cam Spencer shortly afterwards gave the Huskies their first lead. Field goals by Zach Edey, Donovan Clingan, and Spencer over the next few possessions led to another tie at 11–11 before a three-point shot by Newton put the Huskies ahead by three points. Edey and Hassan Diarra traded baskets, each making two from the floor, leading to a two-point UConn lead with twelve minutes remaining in the half. After a Braden Smith jumper, Diarra scored another three-pointer to return UConn to a three-point lead, though several shots by Edey and Smith put Purdue ahead 23–21 nearing eight minutes to play. UConn answered with five unanswered points from Newton and Clingan. The UConn lead jumped to five points on a layup by Newton and a jumper by Stephon Castle increased it to seven with three and a half minutes remaining. UConn maintained this lead for the remainder of the first half; another field goal by Castle with forty-nine seconds left was the last made shot before halftime. At the break, UConn led 36–30.

UConn began the second half with possession and began the scoring through Newton; after shots by Kaufman-Renn and Castle, UConn's lead held at nine points. At the first TV timeout of the half, the Huskies led 43–34 and they expanded the lead to thirteen points shortly after on two dunks by Samson Johnson. Edey scored the game's next four points, followed by shots made by Spencer and Newton to restore the thirteen-point advantage. A Diarra foul with ten minutes to play gave Smith two free throws, which he made, but Alex Karaban's three-pointer and Diarra's jumper on UConn's next two possessions pushed their lead to sixteen points. At the media timeout with under eight minutes remaining in the game, UConn led by seventeen. Out of the timeout, each team went on a run of four straight points: first Purdue, then UConn, leaving the score 63–46. They traded shots over the next two minutes and UConn pushed the lead to eighteen points with under four minutes to play. Six straight points scored by the Boilermakers narrowed their deficit to thirteen points but two free throws by Newton ended the streak. Edey scored three dunks over the next minute but was unable to cut into the UConn lead due to scores by Clingan and Castle, the last of which made the score 75–60 in favor of the Huskies. This lead held for the final forty-five seconds of the game, allowing UConn to claim their second straight national championship.

TBS

April 8, 2024
9:20 p.m. EDT

Report

#MW1 Purdue Boilermakers 60, #E1 UConn Huskies 75
Scoring by half: 30–36, 30–39
| Pts: Edey – 37; Rebs: Edey – 10; Asts: Smith – 8 | Pts: Newton – 20; Rebs: Spencer – 8 Asts: Newton – 7 |

State Farm Stadium – Glendale, Arizona
Attendance: 74,423
Referees: Jeffrey Anderson, Terry Oglesby, Roger Ayers

| Starters: | | | Pts | Reb | Ast |
|---|---|---|---|---|---|
| F | 4 | Trey Kaufman-Renn | 4 | 2 | 0 |
| C | 15 | Zach Edey | 37 | 10 | 0 |
| G | 3 | Braden Smith | 12 | 3 | 8 |
| G | 2 | Fletcher Loyer | 0 | 2 | 0 |
| G | 55 | Lance Jones | 5 | 3 | 0 |
| Reserves: | | | | | |
| F | 23 | Camden Heide | 2 | 1 | 0 |
| F | 1 | Caleb Furst | 0 | 0 | 0 |
| F | 0 | Mason Gillis | 0 | 4 | 0 |
| G | 5 | Myles Colvin | 0 | 2 | 0 |
Head coach:
Matt Painter

| Purdue | UConn |

| Purdue | Statistics | UConn |
|---|---|---|
| 24/54 (44.4%) | Field goals | 30/62 (48.4%) |
| 1/7 (14.3%) | 3-pt field goals | 6/22 (27.3%) |
| 11/15 (73.3%) | Free throws | 9/11 (81.8%) |
| 9 | Offensive rebounds | 14 |
| 19 | Defensive rebounds | 21 |
| 28 | Total rebounds | 35 |
| 8 | Assists | 18 |
| 9 | Turnovers | 8 |
| 3 | Steals | 3 |
| 3 | Blocks | 4 |
| 15 | Fouls | 18 |

| Starters: | | | Pts | Reb | Ast |
|---|---|---|---|---|---|
| F | 11 | Alex Karaban | 5 | 6 | 4 |
| C | 32 | Donovan Clingan | 11 | 5 | 1 |
| G | 5 | Stephon Castle | 15 | 5 | 3 |
| G | 2 | Tristen Newton | 20 | 5 | 7 |
| G | 12 | Cam Spencer | 11 | 8 | 2 |
| Reserves: | | | | | |
| F | 35 | Samson Johnson | 4 | 1 | 1 |
| G | 10 | Hassan Diarra | 9 | 2 | 0 |
Head coach:
Dan Hurley

=== Final Four all-tournament team ===
- Tristen Newton (Most Outstanding Player) – UConn
- Stephon Castle – UConn
- Donovan Clingan – UConn
- Zach Edey – Purdue
- Cam Spencer – UConn

== Media coverage ==
The championship game was televised in the United States by TBS, and simulcast on both TNT and TruTV. Ian Eagle provided play-by-play, while Bill Raftery and Grant Hill both provided color commentary. Tracy Wolfson served as the sideline reporter. This was the first national championship game since 1990 in which Jim Nantz was not performing play-by-play duties. Former college basketball referee Gene Steratore provided rules analysis throughout the game.

== Aftermath ==
UConn's victory marked their sixth overall and second consecutive national championship, making them the first team to repeat as champions since Florida did so in 2006 and 2007. They were the first overall No. 1 seed to win the tournament since Louisville in 2013 (which was vacated). The title was the second for UConn head coach Dan Hurley; he joined John Wooden, Mike Krzyzewski, and Billy Donovan as the only coaches to have won back-to-back national championships.

== See also ==
- 2024 NCAA Division I women's basketball championship game
