= 2022–23 UConn Huskies men's basketball team =

2022–23 UConn Huskies men's basketball

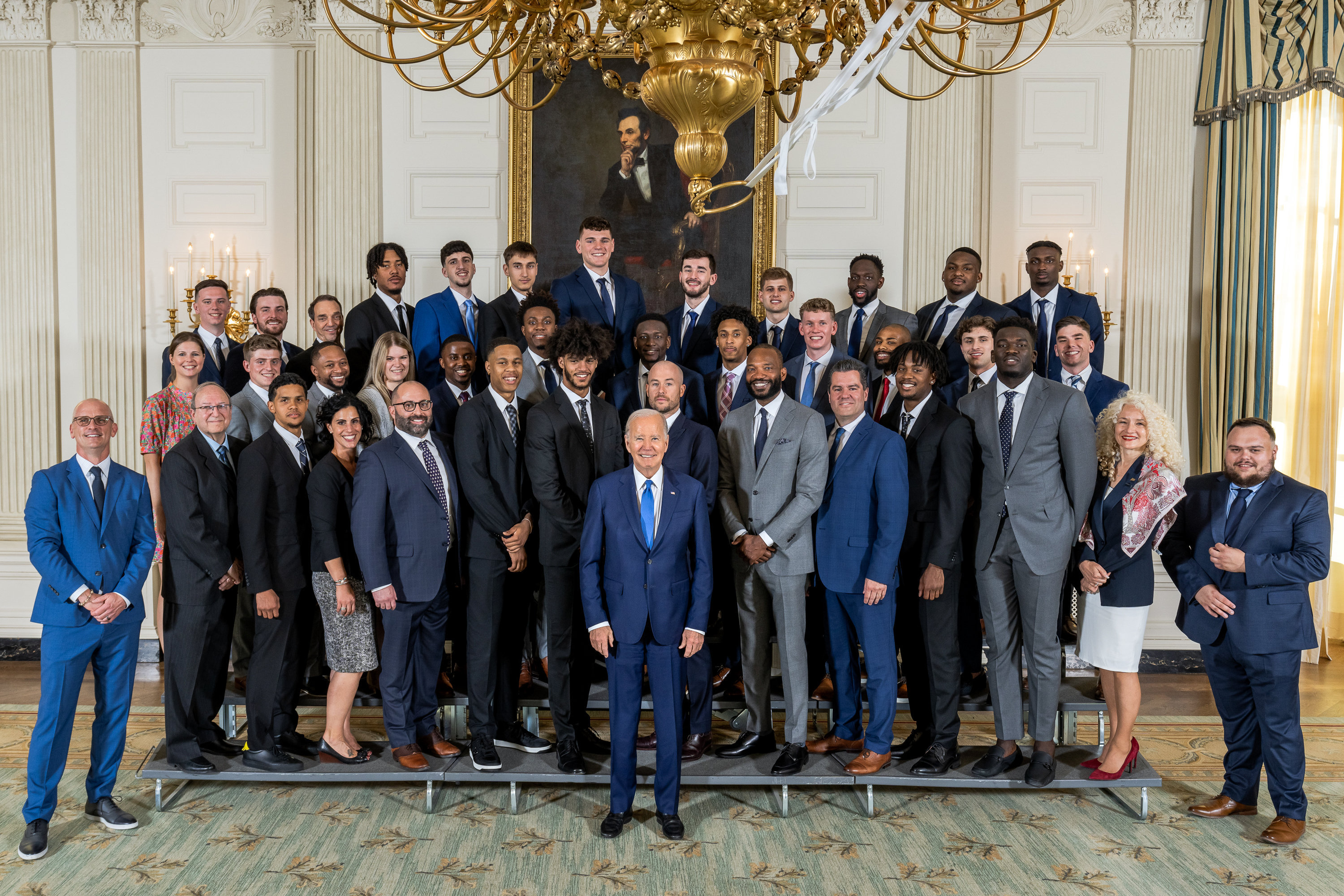

NCAA tournament National Champions Phil Knight Invitational Champions

National Championship Game, W 76–59 vs. San Diego State
- Conference: Big East Conference

Ranking
- Coaches: No. 1
- AP: No. 10
- Record: 31–8 (13–7 Big East)
- Head coach: Dan Hurley (5th season)
- Associate head coach: Kimani Young
- Assistant coaches: Tom Moore; Luke Murray
- Home arena: Harry A. Gampel Pavilion; XL Center

2022–23 Big East men's basketball standings
| | Conf. | | | | Overall |
| Team | W | | L | PCT | W | | L | PCT |
|---|---|---|---|---|---|---|---|---|
| No. 6 Marquette † | 17 | – | 3 | .850 | 29 | – | 7 | .806 |
| No. 13 Xavier | 15 | – | 5 | .750 | 27 | – | 10 | .730 |
| Creighton | 14 | – | 6 | .700 | 24 | – | 13 | .649 |
| No. 10 UConn | 13 | – | 7 | .650 | 31 | – | 8 | .795 |
| Providence | 13 | – | 7 | .650 | 21 | – | 12 | .636 |
| Villanova | 10 | – | 10 | .500 | 17 | – | 17 | .500 |
| Seton Hall | 10 | – | 10 | .500 | 17 | – | 16 | .515 |
| St. John's | 7 | – | 13 | .350 | 18 | – | 15 | .545 |
| Butler | 6 | – | 14 | .300 | 14 | – | 18 | .438 |
| DePaul | 3 | – | 17 | .150 | 10 | – | 23 | .303 |
| Georgetown | 2 | – | 18 | .100 | 7 | – | 25 | .219 |
† 2023 Big East tournament winner Rankings from AP poll

The 2022–23 UConn Huskies men's basketball team represented the University of Connecticut in the 2022–23 NCAA Division I men's basketball season. The Huskies were led by fifth-year head coach Dan Hurley in the team's third season since their return to the Big East Conference. The Huskies played their home games at the Harry A. Gampel Pavilion in Storrs, Connecticut and the XL Center in Hartford, Connecticut.

The Huskies finished the season 31–8, 13–7 in Big East play to finish in a tie for fourth place. As the No. 4 seed in the Big East tournament, they defeated Providence in the quarterfinals before losing to Marquette in the semifinals. They received an at-large bid to the NCAA tournament as the No. 4 seed in the West region. UConn defeated Iona, Saint Mary's, Arkansas, and Gonzaga to advance to the school's sixth Final Four and first since 2014. They defeated Miami and San Diego State to win the national championship game, the school's fifth championship since 1999, and were only the fifth men's team to win all six of its games by 10 points or more. UConn was the first team since the tournament expanded to 64 teams in 1985 (therefore requiring six victories to win the championship), to win every game by at least 13 points.

== Previous season ==
The Huskies finished the season 23–10, 13–6 in Big East play to finish in third place. They defeated Seton Hall in the quarterfinals to advance to the semifinals of the Big East tournament where they lost to Villanova. They received an at-large bid to the NCAA tournament as the No. 5 seed in the West Region, where they were upset in the first round by New Mexico State.

== Offseason ==
=== Departures ===
| Name | Number | Pos. | Height | Weight | Year | Hometown | Reason for departure |
|---|---|---|---|---|---|---|---|
| Jalen Gaffney | 0 | G | 6'3" | 180 | Junior | Columbus, NJ | Transferred to Florida Atlantic |
| Rahsool Diggins | 1 | G | 6'2" | 175 | Freshman | Philadelphia, PA | Transferred to Massachusetts |
| R. J. Cole | 2 | G | 6'1" | 185 | GS Senior | Union, NJ | Graduated/signed to play professionally Lavrio Megabolt |
| Tyrese Martin | 4 | G | 6'6" | 215 | Senior | Allentown, PA | Graduated/2022 NBA draft; selected by 51st overall by Golden State Warriors |
| Isaiah Whaley | 5 | F | 6'9" | 225 | GS Senior | Gastonia, NC | Graduated/went undrafted 2022 NBA draft; signed with Charlotte Hornets |
| Akok Akok | 11 | F | 6'9" | 205 | RS Junior | Manchester, NH | Transferred to Georgetown |
| Tyler Polley | 12 | F | 6'9" | 200 | GS Senior | Miami, FL | Graduated |
| Corey Floyd Jr. | 14 | G | 6'3" | 210 | Freshman | Franklin, NJ | Transferred to Providence |
| Matt Garry | 41 | G | 6'5" | 190 | Senior | Southington, CT | Walk-on; graduate transferred to Endicott College |

=== Incoming transfers ===
| Name | Number | Pos. | Height | Weight | Year | Hometown | Previous school |
|---|---|---|---|---|---|---|---|
| Tristen Newton | 2 | G | 6'5" | 190 | Senior | El Paso, TX | East Carolina |
| Joey Calcaterra | 3 | G | 6'3" | 165 | GS Senior | Novato, CA | San Diego |
| Nahiem Alleyne | 4 | G | 6'4" | 195 | Senior | Buford, GA | Virginia Tech |
| Hassan Diarra | 5 | G | 6'2" | 196 | Junior | Queens, NY | Texas A&M |

=== Recruiting classes ===
==== 2022 recruiting class ====
College recruiting
| Name | Hometown | School | Height | Weight | Commit date |
|---|---|---|---|---|---|
| Donovan Clingan #14 C | Bristol, CT | Bristol Central High School | 7 ft 1 in (2.16 m) | 265 lb (120 kg) | Jul 2, 2021 |
| Donovan Clingan #14 C | Recruit ratings: Scout: Rivals: 247Sports: ESPN: (85) | | | | |
| Yarin Hasson; SF | Rishon Le-Zion, Israel | N/A | 6 ft 9 in (2.06 m) | 208 lb (94 kg) | Aug 24, 2022 |
| Yarin Hasson; SF | Recruit ratings: Scout: Rivals: 247Sports: ESPN: (NR) | | | | |
Overall recruit ranking: Rivals: 14 247Sports: 23 ESPN: 17
Note: In many cases, Scout, Rivals, 247Sports, On3, and ESPN may conflict in their listings of height and weight.; In these cases, the average was taken. ESPN grades are on a 100-point scale.; Sources: "2022 UConn Basketball Commitments". Rivals.; "2022 Team Ranking". Rivals.

==== 2023 recruiting class ====
College recruiting (2023)
| Name | Hometown | School | Height | Weight | Commit date |
|---|---|---|---|---|---|
| Stephon Castle #6 PG | Covington, GA | Newton High School | 6 ft 6 in (1.98 m) | 190 lb (86 kg) | Nov 19, 2021 |
| Stephon Castle #6 PG | Recruit ratings: Scout: Rivals: 247Sports: ESPN: (89) | | | | |
| Solomon Ball #12 SG | Saint James, MD | Brewster Academy | 6 ft 2 in (1.88 m) | 185 lb (84 kg) | Jul 1, 2022 |
| Solomon Ball #12 SG | Recruit ratings: Scout: Rivals: 247Sports: ESPN: (85) | | | | |
| Jaylin Stewart #18 SF | Seattle, WA | Garfield High School | 6 ft 6 in (1.98 m) | 215 lb (98 kg) | Sep 16, 2022 |
| Jaylin Stewart #18 SF | Recruit ratings: Scout: Rivals: 247Sports: ESPN: (82) | | | | |
| Jayden Ross #18 SF | Saint James, MD | Long Island Lutheran High School | 6 ft 6 in (1.98 m) | 195 lb (88 kg) | Jun 27, 2022 |
| Jayden Ross #18 SF | Recruit ratings: Scout: Rivals: 247Sports: ESPN: (82) | | | | |
| Youssouf Singare #41 C | Bronx, NY | Our Savior Lutheran High School | 7 ft 0 in (2.13 m) | 185 lb (84 kg) | Sep 21, 2022 |
| Youssouf Singare #41 C | Recruit ratings: Scout: Rivals: 247Sports: ESPN: (80) | | | | |
Overall recruit ranking: Rivals: 4 247Sports: 4 ESPN: 5
Note: In many cases, Scout, Rivals, 247Sports, On3, and ESPN may conflict in their listings of height and weight.; In these cases, the average was taken. ESPN grades are on a 100-point scale.; Sources: "2023 UConn Basketball Commitments". Rivals.; "2023 Team Ranking". Rivals.

== Roster ==
2022–23 UConn Huskies men's basketball team
Players
Coaches

| Pos. | # | Name | Height | Weight | Year | Previous school | Hometown |
|---|---|---|---|---|---|---|---|
| G | 2 | Tristen Newton | 6 ft 5 in (1.96 m) | 190 lb (86 kg) | Sr | East Carolina | El Paso, TX |
| G | 3 | Joey Calcaterra | 6 ft 3 in (1.91 m) | 180 lb (82 kg) | GS | San Diego | Novato, CA |
| G | 4 | Nahiem Alleyne | 6 ft 4 in (1.93 m) | 195 lb (88 kg) | Sr | Virginia Tech | Buford, GA |
| G | 5 | Hassan Diarra | 6 ft 2 in (1.88 m) | 190 lb (86 kg) | Jr | Texas A&M | Queens, NY |
| F | 11 | Alex Karaban | 6 ft 8 in (2.03 m) | 210 lb (95 kg) | RS Fr | IMG Academy | Southborough, MA |
| F | 13 | Richie Springs | 6 ft 9 in (2.06 m) | 235 lb (107 kg) | RS Jr | The MacDuffie School | Brooklyn, NY |
| G | 20 | Andrew Hurley (W) | 6 ft 1 in (1.85 m) | 170 lb (77 kg) | Jr | East Catholic | Glastonbury, CT |
| F | 21 | Adama Sanogo (C) | 6 ft 9 in (2.06 m) | 245 lb (111 kg) | Jr | The Patrick School | Bamako, Mali |
| G | 24 | Jordan Hawkins | 6 ft 5 in (1.96 m) | 195 lb (88 kg) | So | DeMatha Catholic | Gaithersburg, MD |
| F | 30 | Yarin Hasson | 6 ft 9 in (2.06 m) | 205 lb (93 kg) | Fr | Maccabi Rishon LeZion | Gan Yavne, Israel |
| C | 32 | Donovan Clingan | 7 ft 2 in (2.18 m) | 265 lb (120 kg) | Fr | Bristol Central | Bristol, CT |
| G | 33 | Apostolos Roumoglou | 6 ft 7 in (2.01 m) | 200 lb (91 kg) | Fr | P.A.O.K. BC | Xanthi, Greece |
| F | 35 | Samson Johnson | 6 ft 10 in (2.08 m) | 215 lb (98 kg) | So | The Patrick School | Lomé, Togo |
| G | 40 | Andre Johnson Jr. (W) | 6 ft 4 in (1.93 m) | 160 lb (73 kg) | Fr | South Kent School | Bristol, CT |
| G | 41 | Emmett Hendry (W) | 6 ft 3 in (1.91 m) | 155 lb (70 kg) | Fr | Montverde Academy | Brooklyn, NY |
| G | 44 | Andre Jackson Jr. (C) | 6 ft 6 in (1.98 m) | 210 lb (95 kg) | Jr | Albany Academy | Amsterdam, NY |

Head coach

- Dan Hurley (Seton Hall)

Assistant coach(es)

- Kimani Young (UTEP)
- Tom Moore (Boston University)
- Luke Murray (Fairfield)

Legend

- (C) Team captain
- (S) Suspended
- (I) Ineligible
- (W) Walk-on
- Injured
- Current redshirt

Roster

== Schedule and results ==
| Date time, TV | Rank^{#} | Opponent^{#} | Result | Record | High points | High rebounds | High assists | Site (attendance) city, state |
Non-conference regular season
| November 7, 2022*; 7:30 p.m., FS1 | | Stonehill | W 85–54 | 1–0 | 19 – Sanogo | 7 – Clingan | 7 – Diarra | XL Center (9,116); Hartford, CT |
| November 11, 2022*; 6:00 p.m., FS2 | | Boston University | W 86–57 | 2–0 | 27 – Sanogo | 15 – Sanogo | 6 – Diarra | Harry A. Gampel Pavilion (9,156); Storrs, CT |
| November 15, 2022*; 7:00 p.m., CBSSN | No. 25 | Buffalo | W 84–64 | 3–0 | 22 – Newton | 10 – Newton | 11 – Newton | XL Center (10,112); Hartford, CT |
| November 18, 2022*; 8:30 p.m., FS2 | No. 25 | UNC Wilmington | W 86–50 | 4–0 | 24 – Sanogo | 6 – Clingan | 5 – Jackson Jr. | Harry A. Gampel Pavilion (7,766); Storrs, CT |
| November 20, 2022*; 5:00 p.m., FS1 | No. 25 | Delaware State | W 95–60 | 5–0 | 26 – Sanogo | 9 – Hawkins | 6 – Calcaterra | XL Center (9,442); Hartford, CT |
| November 24, 2022*; 8:00 p.m., ESPN2 | No. 20 | vs. Oregon; Phil Knight Invitational Quarterfinal | W 83–59 | 6–0 | 23 – Newton | 8 – Clingan | 6 – Newton | Moda Center (5,598); Portland, OR |
| November 25, 2022*; 9:30 p.m., ESPN | No. 20 | vs. No. 18 Alabama; Phil Knight Invitational Semifinal | W 82–67 | 7–0 | 25 – Sanogo | 7 – Jackson Jr. | 8 – Newton | Veterans Memorial Coliseum (3,603); Portland, OR |
| November 27, 2022*; 10:00 p.m., ESPN | No. 20 | vs. Iowa State; Phil Knight Invitational Championship | W 71–53 | 8–0 | 15 – Clingan | 13 – Jackson Jr. | 5 – Jackson Jr. | Moda Center (5,005); Portland, OR |
| December 1, 2022*; 6:30 p.m., FS1 | No. 8 | Oklahoma State; Big East–Big 12 Battle | W 74–64 | 9–0 | 26 – Hawkins | 7 – Jackson Jr. | 6 – Jackson Jr. | Harry A. Gampel Pavilion (10,167); Storrs, CT |
| December 7, 2022*; 9:00 p.m., ESPN2 | No. 5 | at Florida | W 75–54 | 10–0 | 17 – Sanogo | 8 – Tied | 4 – Jackson Jr. | O'Connell Center (9,046); Gainesville, FL |
| December 10, 2022*; 12:30 p.m., FS1 | No. 5 | LIU | W 114–61 | 11–0 | 22 – Hawkins | 11 – Clingan | 7 – Tied | Harry A. Gampel Pavilion (10,167); Storrs, CT |
Big East regular season
| December 17, 2022; 7:00 p.m., FS1 | No. 3 | at Butler | W 68–46 | 12–0 (1–0) | 27 – Sanogo | 14 – Sanogo | 6 – Jackson Jr. | Hinkle Fieldhouse (8,283); Indianapolis, IN |
| December 20, 2022; 6:30 p.m., FS1 | No. 2 | Georgetown; Rivalry | W 84–73 | 13–0 (2–0) | 17 – Newton | 8 – Jackson Jr. | 8 – Jackson Jr. | Harry A. Gampel Pavilion (10,167); Storrs, CT |
| December 28, 2022; 6:30 p.m., FS1 | No. 2 | Villanova | W 74–66 | 14–0 (3–0) | 22 – Hawkins | 7 – Hawkins | 4 – Newton | XL Center (15,564); Hartford, CT |
| December 31, 2022; 12:00 p.m., FOX | No. 2 | at No. 22 Xavier | L 73–83 | 14–1 (3–1) | 18 – Sanogo | 10 – Jackson Jr. | 8 – Jackson Jr. | Cintas Center (10,565); Cincinnati, OH |
| January 4, 2023; 8:30 p.m., FS1 | No. 4 | at Providence | L 61–73 | 14–2 (3–2) | 15 – Hawkins | 11 – Clingan | 5 – Newton | Amica Mutual Pavilion (12,400); Providence, RI |
| January 7, 2023; 12:00 p.m., FOX | No. 4 | Creighton | W 69–60 | 15–2 (4–2) | 26 – Sanogo | 9 – Tied | 2 – Tied | Harry A. Gampel Pavilion (10,167); Storrs, CT |
| January 11, 2023; 7:00 p.m., CBSSN | No. 6 | at No. 25 Marquette | L 76–82 | 15–3 (4–3) | 20 – Clingan | 10 – Clingan | 6 – Jackson Jr. | Fiserv Forum (15,116); Milwaukee, WI |
| January 15, 2023; 12:00 p.m., FS1 | No. 6 | St. John's | L 74–85 | 15–4 (4–4) | 31 – Hawkins | 10 – Sanogo | 4 – Diarra | XL Center (15,564); Hartford, CT |
| January 18, 2023; 6:30 p.m., FS1 | No. 15 | at Seton Hall | L 66–67 | 15–5 (4–5) | 16 – Sanogo | 10 – Jackson Jr. | 4 – Tied | Prudential Center (9,710); Newark, NJ |
| January 22, 2023; 12:00 p.m., FOX | No. 15 | Butler | W 86–56 | 16–5 (5–5) | 20 – Hawkins | 14 – Sanogo | 4 – Jackson Jr. | XL Center (15,564); Hartford, CT |
| January 25, 2023; 6:30 p.m., FS1 | No. 19 | No. 13 Xavier | L 79–82 | 16–6 (5–6) | 28 – Hawkins | 9 – Sanogo | 4 – Tied | Harry A. Gampel Pavilion (10,167); Storrs, CT |
| January 31, 2023; 8:00 p.m., FS1 | No. 24 | at DePaul | W 90–76 | 17–6 (6–6) | 26 – Hawkins | 9 – Tied | 5 – Karaban | Wintrust Arena (3,956); Chicago, IL |
| February 4, 2023; 12:00 p.m., FS1 | No. 24 | at Georgetown; Rivalry | W 68–62 | 18–6 (7–6) | 15 – Tied | 10 – Jackson Jr. | 7 – Jackson Jr. | Capital One Arena (10,621); Washington, D.C. |
| February 7, 2023; 6:30 p.m., FS1 | No. 21 | No. 10 Marquette | W 87–72 | 19–6 (8–6) | 20 – Hawkins | 10 – Newton | 12 – Newton | XL Center (15,564); Hartford, CT |
| February 11, 2023; 2:00 p.m., FOX | No. 21 | at No. 23 Creighton | L 53–56 | 19–7 (8–7) | 17 – Sanogo | 10 – Sanogo | 4 – Newton | CHI Health Center Omaha (18,286); Omaha, NE |
| February 18, 2023; 12:00 p.m., FOX | No. 20 | Seton Hall | W 64–55 | 20–7 (9–7) | 20 – Hawkins | 10 – Jackson Jr. | 4 – Diarra | Harry A. Gampel Pavilion (10,167); Storrs, CT |
| February 22, 2023; 6:30 p.m., FS1 | No. 18 | No. 20 Providence | W 87–69 | 21–7 (10–7) | 20 – Hawkins | 8 – Karaban | 7 – Newton | Harry A. Gampel Pavilion (10,167); Storrs, CT |
| February 25, 2023; 12:00 p.m., CBS | No. 18 | at St. John's | W 95–86 | 22–7 (11–7) | 20 – Hawkins | 9 – Sanogo | 8 – Newton | Madison Square Garden (12,241); New York, NY |
| March 1, 2023; 7:00 p.m., CBSSN | No. 14 | DePaul | W 88–59 | 23–7 (12–7) | 26 – Sanogo | 8 – Jackson Jr. | 9 – Jackson Jr. | XL Center (15,564); Hartford, CT |
| March 4, 2023; 7:30 p.m., FOX | No. 14 | at Villanova | W 71–59 | 24–7 (13–7) | 24 – Hawkins | 9 – Sanogo | 5 – Jackson Jr. | Wells Fargo Center (16,264); Philadelphia, PA |
Big East tournament
| March 9, 2023; 2:30 p.m., FS1 | (4) No. 11 | vs. (5) Providence; Quarterfinal | W 73–66 | 25–7 | 19 – Hawkins | 11 – Jackson Jr. | 7 – Newton | Madison Square Garden (19,812); New York, NY |
| March 10, 2023; 6:30 p.m., FS1 | (4) No. 11 | vs. (1) No. 6 Marquette; Semifinal | L 68–70 | 25–8 | 19 – Sanogo | 11 – Sanogo | 6 – Newton | Madison Square Garden (19,812); New York, NY |
NCAA Tournament
| March 17, 2023*; 4:30 p.m., TBS | (4 W) No. 10 | vs. (13 W) Iona; First round | W 87–63 | 26–8 | 28 – Sanogo | 13 – Sanogo | 7 – Jackson Jr. | MVP Arena (14,010); Albany, NY |
| March 19, 2023*; 6:10 p.m., TNT | (4 W) No. 10 | vs. (5 W) No. 19 Saint Mary's; Second round | W 70–55 | 27–8 | 24 – Sanogo | 8 – Sanogo | 7 – Jackson Jr. | MVP Arena (13,984); Albany, NY |
| March 23, 2023*; 7:15 p.m., CBS | (4 W) No. 10 | vs. (8 W) Arkansas; Sweet Sixteen | W 88–65 | 28–8 | 24 – Hawkins | 8 – Tied | 7 – Tied | T-Mobile Arena (18,544); Las Vegas, NV |
| March 25, 2023*; 8:49 p.m., TBS | (4 W) No. 10 | vs. (3 W) No. 9 Gonzaga; Elite Eight | W 82–54 | 29–8 | 20 – Hawkins | 10 – Sanogo | 10 – Jackson Jr. | T-Mobile Arena (18,119); Las Vegas, NV |
| April 1, 2023*; 8:49 p.m., CBS | (4 W) No. 10 | vs. (5 MW) No. 16 Miami (FL); Final Four | W 72–59 | 30–8 | 21 – Sanogo | 10 – Sanogo | 8 – Newton | NRG Stadium (73,860); Houston, TX |
| April 3, 2023*; 9:20 p.m., CBS | (4 W) No. 10 | vs. (5 S) No. 18 San Diego State; National Championship | W 76–59 | 31–8 | 19 – Newton | 10 – Tied | 6 – Jackson Jr. | NRG Stadium (72,423); Houston, TX |
*Non-conference game. ^{#}Rankings from AP Poll. (#) Tournament seedings in parentheses. W=West. MW=Midwest. S=South. All times are in Eastern Time.

== Rankings ==
Ranking movements Legend: ██ Increase in ranking ██ Decrease in ranking RV = Received votes ( ) = First-place votes
| | Week | | | | | | | | | | | | | | | | | | | |
| Poll | Pre | 1 | 2 | 3 | 4 | 5 | 6 | 7 | 8 | 9 | 10 | 11 | 12 | 13 | 14 | 15 | 16 | 17 | 18 | Final |
|---|---|---|---|---|---|---|---|---|---|---|---|---|---|---|---|---|---|---|---|---|
| AP | RV | 25 | 20 | 8 | 5 | 3 (15) | 2 (21) | 2 (20) | 4 (1) | 6 | 15 | 19 | 24 | 21 | 20 | 18 | 14 | 11 | 10 | Not released |
| Coaches | RV | RV | 22 | 6 | 5 | 3 | 2 (7) | 2 (7) | 5 | 7 | 14 | 20 | 23 | 21 | 23 | 23 | 18 | 14 | 12 | 1 (32) |

*AP does not release post-NCAA Tournament rankings.

== Awards and honors ==
=== Big East Conference honors ===
==== All-Big East First Team ====
- Jordan Hawkins
- Adama Sanogo

==== Big East All-Freshman Team ====
- Donovan Clingan
- Alex Karaban

=== National honors ===
==== NCAA basketball tournament Most Outstanding Player ====
- Adama Sanogo
