= Joey Calcaterra =

American basketball player (born 1998)

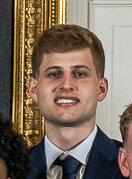
- Calcaterra in 2023

No. 50 – Long Island Nets
- Position: Shooting guard / point guard
- League: NBA G League

Personal information
- Born: October 15, 1998 (age 28)
- Listed height: 6 ft 3 in (1.91 m)
- Listed weight: 165 lb (75 kg)

Career information
- High school: Marin Catholic (Kentfield, California)
- College: San Diego (2018–2022); UConn (2022–2023)
- NBA draft: 2023: undrafted
- Playing career: 2023–present

Career history
- 2023–2024: South Bay Lakers
- 2024–2025: Santa Cruz Warriors
- 2025: Stockton Kings
- 2026: Memphis Hustle
- 2026–present: Long Island Nets

Career highlights
- NBA G League champion (2025); NCAA champion (2023)

Joseph Edward Calcaterra (born October 15, 1998) is an American professional basketball player for the Long Island Nets of the NBA G League. He played college basketball for the UConn Huskies and San Diego Toreros.

== Early life and high school career ==
Calcaterra grew up in Novato, California and attended Marin Catholic High School. As a junior, he averaged 27.4 points, five rebounds, three assists per game and was named First Team All-State California Juniors and Second Team All-Metro Bay Area. He was named the North Bay Player of the Year as a senior.

== College career ==
Calcaterra began his college basketball career with the San Diego Toreros and redshirted his true freshman season. He averaged 2.8 points per game as a redshirt freshman. Calcaterra entered his redshirt sophomore season as the Toreros' starting shooting guard and averaged 11.4 points, 2.8 rebounds, and 1.8 assists per game. He averaged 13.3 points over 12 games during his redshirt junior season, which was shortened due because of the effects of the coronavirus pandemic. As a redshirt senior he averaged 8.5 points per game. After the season, Calcaterra decided to utilize the extra year of eligibility granted to college athletes who played in the 2020 season due to the coronavirus pandemic and entered the NCAA transfer portal.

Calcaterra ultimately transferred to UConn. Calcaterra scored six points off the bench in the 2023 national championship game as the Huskies won 76–59.

== Professional career ==
=== South Bay Lakers (2023–2024) ===
After going undrafted in the 2023 NBA draft, Calcaterra joined the South Bay Lakers on October 28, 2023, but was waived on January 10, 2024. However, he rejoined the Lakers on January 20. After the season, Calcaterra committed to play for Stars of Storrs, a team of UConn alumni, in the 2024 edition of The Basketball Tournament.

=== Santa Cruz Warriors (2024–2025) ===
On October 26, 2024, Calcaterra was traded to the Santa Cruz Warriors. He was waived on November 5, but re-joined Santa Cruz two days later. On February 7th, 2025, the Santa Cruz Warriors waived Calcaterra after acquiring Alex Gil-Fernandez.

=== Stockton Kings (2025-2026) ===
On March 9, 2025, the Stockton Kings acquired Calcaterra from the NBA G League player pool. Following the season, Calcaterra returned to the Stockton Kings on October 24, 2025, but was waived on November 6, 2025, becoming an unrestricted free agent as of November 18, 2025.

== Career statistics ==
=== College ===
Year	Team	GP	GS	MPG	FG%	3P%	FT%	RPG	APG	SPG	BPG	PPG
2018–19	San Diego	32	5	12.4	.384	.313	.737	.9	.8	.3	.2	2.8
2019–20	San Diego	32	32	28.2	.382	.362	.817	2.8	1.8	.8	.1	11.3
2020–21	San Diego	12	10	29.9	.419	.377	.867	3.1	1.8	1.1	.3	13.3
2021–22	San Diego	29	23	26.8	.388	.347	.872	2.8	1.3	.7	.1	8.5
2022–23	UConn	34	0	14.6	.425	.447	.895	1.8	1.3	.6	.1	5.9
Career		143	70	20.9	.396	.380	.837	2.1	1.3	.6	.1	7.6
