= Donovan Clingan =

American basketball player (born 2004)

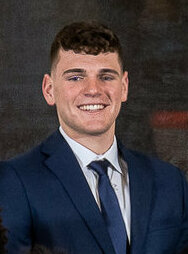
- Clingan in 2023

No. 23 – Portland Trail Blazers
- Position: Center
- League: NBA

Personal information
- Born: February 23, 2004 (age 22) Bristol, Connecticut, U.S.
- Listed height: 7 ft 2 in (2.18 m)
- Listed weight: 280 lb (127 kg)

Career information
- High school: Bristol Central (Bristol, Connecticut)
- College: UConn (2022–2024)
- NBA draft: 2024: 1st round, 7th overall pick
- Drafted by: Portland Trail Blazers
- Playing career: 2024–present

Career history
- 2024–present: Portland Trail Blazers

Career highlights
- NBA All-Rookie Second Team (2025); 2× NCAA champion (2023, 2024); AP Honorable Mention All-American (2024); Big East All-Freshman team (2023)
- Stats at NBA.com
- Stats at Basketball Reference

Donovan John Clingan (born February 23, 2004) is an American professional basketball player for the Portland Trail Blazers of the National Basketball Association (NBA). He played college basketball for the UConn Huskies, winning two consecutive national championships in 2023 and 2024.

== Early life and high school career ==
Clingan grew up in Bristol, Connecticut, and attended Bristol Central High School, where he led the boys basketball team to a 2022 Connecticut Interscholastic Athletic Conference Division II state championship. Clingan averaged 27.3 points, 17.2 rebounds and 5.8 blocks per game as a junior and was named the Connecticut Gatorade Player of the Year. Clingan repeated as the Connecticut Gatorade Player of the Year after averaging 30.3 points, 18.4 rebounds and 6.2 blocks per game during his senior season. On July 2, 2021, he committed to playing college basketball for UConn over offers from Michigan, Michigan State, Ohio State, Georgetown, Syracuse, Providence and Rutgers.

Clingan grew up with and is close friends with current UConn Huskies football running back Victor Rosa. Rosa was Clingan's point guard in high school, and was a record-breaking football player as well.

== College career ==
Clingan entered his freshman season at UConn as the Huskies' backup center behind Adama Sanogo. He was named to the Big East Conference All-Freshman team at the end of the regular season. Clingan scored four points with three rebounds, a block and two steals in the 2023 national championship game as the Huskies won 76–59. Although he was considered to be a likely selection in the 2023 NBA draft, he decided to return to UConn for his sophomore season.

Clingan entered his sophomore year as UConn's starting center. He suffered a foot injury in a game against Seton Hall on December 20, 2023. Clingan returned on January 17, 2024, scoring six points and grabbing five rebounds in 16 minutes of play in a 62–48 win over 18th-ranked Creighton.

On April 12, 2024, Clingan declared for the 2024 NBA draft, forgoing his remaining college eligibility.

== Professional career ==
=== 2024–25 season: Rookie season ===
Clingan was selected with the seventh overall pick by the Portland Trail Blazers in the 2024 NBA draft. With his college number 32 retired by the Trail Blazers for Bill Walton, Clingan chose 23 as his jersey number. On July 4, he signed with Portland. Clingan participated on the Trail Blazers summer league team and was named to the All-NBA Summer League Second Team.

Clingan made his NBA debut on October 23, 2024, in a 140–104 loss to the Golden State Warriors. On November 12, Clingan made his first career start in a win against the Minnesota Timberwolves. In the next game on November 13, Clingan again started and recorded career highs in both blocks (8) and points (17) in another win against the Minnesota Timberwolves.

At seasons end, Clingan led all rookies in both total blocks (110) and blocks per game (1.6). Clingan became the first Trail Blazers rookie since Damian Lillard to earn All Rookie honors when he was named to the NBA All-Rookie Second Team.

=== 2025–26 season: Full-time starter ===
On October 21, 2025, the Trail Blazers exercised their 2026-27 team option on Clingan. After not being selected for the Rising Stars Challenge in his rookie season, Clingan was selected to compete in the 2026 Rising Stars Challenge at All Star Weekend in Inglewood, California. On March 18, 2026, Clingan recorded a career–high 28 points in a win against the Indiana Pacers.

At seasons end, Clingan set the Trail Blazers franchise single-season records for total offensive rebounds (347) and offensive rebounds per game (4.5), also leading the NBA in both categories. He also finished fifth in the league in blocks per game (1.7).

== Career statistics ==
Legend
GP	Games played	GS	Games started	MPG	Minutes per game
FG%	Field goal percentage	3P%	3-point field goal percentage	FT%	Free throw percentage
RPG	Rebounds per game	APG	Assists per game	SPG	Steals per game
BPG	Blocks per game	PPG	Points per game	**Bold**	Career high

=== NBA ===
==== Regular season ====
Year	Team	GP	GS	MPG	FG%	3P%	FT%	RPG	APG	SPG	BPG	PPG
2024–25	Portland	67	37	19.8	**.539**	.286	.596	7.9	1.1	.5	1.6	6.5
2025–26	Portland	**77**	**77**	**27.2**	.520	**.341**	**.680**	**11.6**	**2.1**	**.6**	**1.7**	**12.1**
Career		144	114	23.7	.527	.332	.651	9.9	1.7	.5	1.7	9.5

==== Playoffs ====
Year	Team	GP	GS	MPG	FG%	3P%	FT%	RPG	APG	SPG	BPG	PPG
2026	Portland	5	5	21.4	.304	.200	.500	7.8	2.2	.2	.6	7.0
Career		5	5	21.4	.304	.200	.500	7.8	2.2	.2	.6	7.0

=== College ===
Year	Team	GP	GS	MPG	FG%	3P%	FT%	RPG	APG	SPG	BPG	PPG
2022–23	UConn	**39**	0	13.1	**.655**	.000	.517	5.6	.5	.4	1.8	6.9
2023–24	UConn	35	**33**	**22.5**	.639	**.250**	**.583**	**7.4**	**1.5**	**.5**	**2.5**	**13.0**
Career		74	33	17.6	.645	.222	.558	6.4	1.0	.5	2.1	9.8

== Personal life ==
Clingan is the son of Bill and Stacey Porrini Clingan. He has one younger sister, Olivia. Clingan's mother, Stacey Clingan, also played basketball at Bristol Central where she set school records for career rebounds and blocks before playing college basketball at the University of Maine. Stacey Clingan died of breast cancer in March 2018. Clingan wore number 32, his mother's number, in Bristol and at UConn.
