= Nahiem Alleyne =

American basketball player (born 2001)

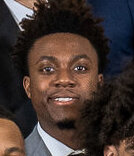
- Alleyne in 2023

No. 4 – Fraport Skyliners
- Position: Shooting guard
- League: Basketball Bundesliga; EuroCup

Personal information
- Born: July 23, 2001 (age 25) Lawrenceville, Georgia, U.S.
- Listed height: 6 ft 4 in (1.93 m)
- Listed weight: 193 lb (88 kg)

Career information
- High school: South Gwinnett (Snellville, Georgia); Mountain View (Lawrenceville, Georgia)
- College: Virginia Tech (2019–2022); UConn (2022–2023); St. John's (2023–2024)
- NBA draft: 2024: undrafted
- Playing career: 2024–present

Career history
- 2024–2025: AEK Athens
- 2024–2025: → Trefl Sopot
- 2025–present: Fraport Skyliners

Career highlights
- NCAA champion (2023)

Nahiem Dymeke Alleyne (born July 23, 2001) is an American professional basketball player for the Skyliners Frankfurt of the Basketball Bundesliga (BBL) and the EuroCup. He played college basketball for the Virginia Tech Hokies, UConn Huskies and St. John's Red Storm.

== Early life and high school career ==
Alleyne grew up in Lawrenceville, Georgia and attended South Gwinnett High School. After his tenure with South Gwinnett, Alleyne attended Mountain View High School in Lawrenceville, Georgia.

== College career ==
Alleyne began his college basketball career with the Virginia Tech Hokies and stayed with the team for three seasons. He averaged 9.6 points per game during his junior season. Alleyne entered the transfer portal in 2022, and ultimately transferred to UConn. Alleyne scored six points off the bench in the 2023 national championship game as the Huskies won 76–59.

After winning the NCAA championship, Alleyne was once again transferred, this time to St. John's Red Storm, under coach Rick Pitino. He averaged 6.5 points and 1.7 rebounds per game, being a three-point and defensive specialist for the squad.

== Professional career ==
=== AEK Athens (2024–2025) ===
On July 31, 2024, after going undrafted at the 2024 NBA Draft, Alleyne joined AEK Athens of the Greek Basketball League and the Basketball Champions League.

==== Trefl Sopot (2024–2025) ====
On November 22, 2024, Alleyne renewed his contract with AEK and was subsequently loaned to Trefl Sopot of the Polish Basketball League (PLK) for the remainder of the season.

=== Fraport Skyliners (2025–present) ===
On August 25, 2025, he signed with Skyliners Frankfurt of the Basketball Bundesliga (BBL).
