= Jordan Hawkins =

American basketball player (born 2002)

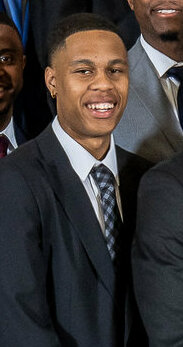
- Hawkins in 2023

No. 15 – Chicago Bulls
- Position: Shooting guard
- League: NBA

Personal information
- Born: April 29, 2002 (age 24) Gaithersburg, Maryland, U.S.
- Listed height: 6 ft 4 in (1.93 m)
- Listed weight: 190 lb (86 kg)

Career information
- High school: Gaithersburg (Gaithersburg, Maryland); DeMatha Catholic (Hyattsville, Maryland)
- College: UConn (2021–2023)
- NBA draft: 2023: 1st round, 14th overall pick
- Drafted by: New Orleans Pelicans
- Playing career: 2023–present

Career history
- 2023–2026: New Orleans Pelicans
- 2023–2024: →Birmingham Squadron
- 2026–present: Chicago Bulls
- 2026–present: →Windy City Bulls

Career highlights
- NCAA champion (2023); First-team All-Big East (2023); Big East All-Freshman team (2022)
- Stats at NBA.com
- Stats at Basketball Reference

Jordan Dorrell Hawkins (born April 29, 2002) is an American professional basketball player for the Chicago Bulls of the National Basketball Association (NBA), on a two-way contract with the Windy City Bulls of the NBA G League. He played college basketball for the UConn Huskies. Hawkins was selected with the 14th overall pick by the New Orleans Pelicans in the first round of the 2023 NBA draft.

== Early life and high school career ==
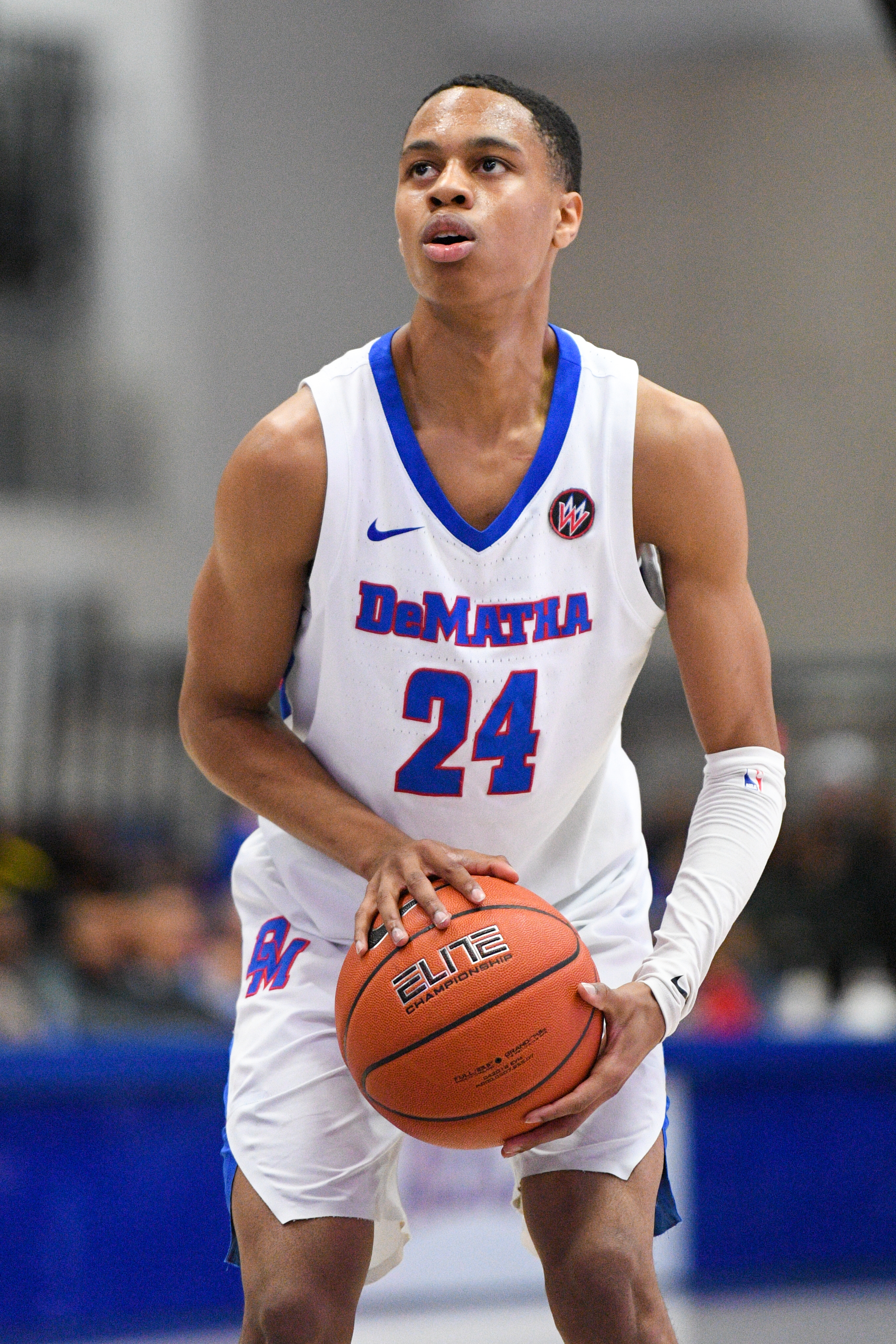
Hawkins with DeMatha

Hawkins grew up in Gaithersburg, Maryland and initially attended Gaithersburg High School. He transferred to DeMatha Catholic High School after his sophomore year. Hawkins was named the Maryland Gatorade Player of the Year as a senior after averaging 19.7 points, 11.4 rebounds, 3.7 assists, 2.3 steals, and 1.9 blocks per game. Hawkins was rated a four-star recruit and committed to playing college basketball for UConn over offers from Louisville, Marquette, Xavier, and Seton Hall.

== College career ==
Hawkins played in 27 games as a freshman and averaged 5.8 points and two rebounds per game. He was named to the Big East Conference All-Freshman team at the end of the season. Hawkins suffered a concussion near the end of the season and missed the Huskies' Big East Tournament and NCAA Tournament games.

Hawkins entered his sophomore season as the Huskies' starting shooting guard. He suffered a second concussion during UConn's season opener. Hawkins missed two games and scored 20 points in his return against UNC-Wilmington. He was named first team All-Big East at the end of the regular season and averaged 16.2 points, 3.8 rebounds, and 1.3 assists per game. Hawkins was named the Most Outstanding Player of the West Regional of the 2023 NCAA tournament after averaging 22 points and four rebounds in the Huskies' Sweet Sixteen and Elite Eight games. He scored 16 points against San Diego State in the 2023 national championship game as the Huskies won 76–59. Shortly after the game, Hawkins announced that he would forgo the remainder of his college eligibility and enter the 2023 NBA draft.

== Professional career ==
The New Orleans Pelicans selected Hawkins with the fourteenth overall pick in the 2023 NBA draft. On January 13, 2024, he scored a career-high 34 points and grabbed 5 rebounds as the Pelicans won 118–108 over the Dallas Mavericks.

On September 8, 2026, Hawkins, alongside Micah Peavy, a future second-round draft pick, and a pick swap, was traded to the Memphis Grizzlies in exchange for Taj Gibson and AJ Johnson On October 2, 2026, Hawkins and the Memphis Grizzlies agreed to part ways.

On October 6, 2026, Hawkins signed a two-way contract with the Chicago Bulls, splitting time with their NBA G League affiliate, the Windy City Bulls.

== Career statistics ==
Legend
| GP | Games played | GS | Games started | MPG | Minutes per game |
| FG% | Field goal percentage | 3P% | 3-point field goal percentage | FT% | Free throw percentage |
| RPG | Rebounds per game | APG | Assists per game | SPG | Steals per game |
| BPG | Blocks per game | PPG | Points per game | **Bold** | Career high |

=== NBA ===
==== Regular season ====
| Year | Team | GP | GS | MPG | FG% | 3P% | FT% | RPG | APG | SPG | BPG | PPG |
|---|---|---|---|---|---|---|---|---|---|---|---|---|
| 2023–24 | New Orleans | **67** | **10** | 17.3 | **.382** | **.366** | .838 | 2.2 | 1.0 | .3 | .1 | 7.8 |
| 2024–25 | New Orleans | 56 | 9 | **23.6** | .372 | .331 | .816 | **2.8** | **1.2** | **.5** | **.4** | **10.8** |
| 2025–26 | New Orleans | 51 | 1 | 13.6 | .366 | .348 | **.852** | 1.7 | .8 | .3 | .2 | 5.1 |
| Career | | 174 | 20 | 18.2 | .374 | .348 | .829 | 2.3 | 1.0 | .4 | .2 | 8.0 |

==== Playoffs ====
| Year | Team | GP | GS | MPG | FG% | 3P% | FT% | RPG | APG | SPG | BPG | PPG |
|---|---|---|---|---|---|---|---|---|---|---|---|---|
| 2024 | New Orleans | 3 | 0 | 3.8 | .000 | .000 | — | .7 | .0 | .0 | .0 | .0 |
| Career | | 3 | 0 | 3.8 | .000 | .000 | — | .7 | .0 | .0 | .0 | .0 |

=== College ===
| Year | Team | GP | GS | MPG | FG% | 3P% | FT% | RPG | APG | SPG | BPG | PPG |
|---|---|---|---|---|---|---|---|---|---|---|---|---|
| 2021–22 | UConn | 27 | 4 | 14.7 | .353 | .333 | .821 | 2.0 | .5 | .3 | .3 | 5.8 |
| 2022–23 | UConn | **37** | **37** | **29.4** | **.409** | **.388** | **.887** | **3.8** | **1.3** | **.7** | **.5** | **16.2** |
| Career | | 64 | 41 | 23.2 | .396 | .376 | .872 | 3.0 | 1.0 | .5 | .4 | 11.8 |

== Personal life ==
Hawkins' cousin, Angel Reese, played college basketball for the LSU Tigers women's team and professionally for the Chicago Sky and Atlanta Dream. Hawkins and Reese both won national championships in 2023, within two days of each other. They were also born very close, with Jordan being older by one week.
