= 2023 NCAA Division I men's basketball championship game =

American collegiate basketball final

2023 NCAA Division I men’s basketball championship game
National championship game
San Diego State Aztecs	UConn Huskies
Mountain West	Big East
(32–6)	(30–8)
59	76
Head coach: Brian Dutcher	Head coach: Dan Hurley
- AP: 18
- Coaches: 18
- AP: 10
- Coaches: 12
	1st half	2nd half	Total
San Diego State Aztecs	24	35	59
UConn Huskies	36	40	76
- Date: April 3, 2023
- Venue: NRG Stadium, Houston, Texas
- MVP: Adama Sanogo, UConn
- Favorite: UConn by 7
- Referees: Ron Groover, Keith Kimble, Terry Oglesby
- Attendance: 72,423
- National anthem: Tracy Dyson

United States TV coverage
- Network: CBS
- Announcers: Jim Nantz, Bill Raftery, Grant Hill, and Tracy Wolfson
- Nielsen Ratings: 3.73 (14.69 million)

The 2023 NCAA Division I men's basketball championship game was the final game of the 2023 NCAA Division I men's basketball tournament. It determined the national champion for the 2022–23 NCAA Division I men's basketball season and was contested by the San Diego State Aztecs from the Mountain West Conference and the Connecticut (UConn) Huskies from the Big East Conference. The game was played on April 3, 2023, at NRG Stadium in Houston, Texas. In the game, UConn defeated San Diego State 76–59 to win their fifth national championship in five appearances. Adama Sanogo of UConn was named Most Outstanding Player (MOP) of the Final Four. Despite losing, San Diego State became the first team from the Mountain West Conference to reach the semifinals or the final.

== Participants ==
The game was the second all-time meeting between UConn and San Diego State; the first game was on March 24, 2011, at the Honda Center in Anaheim, California, which UConn won by seven points.

=== San Diego State Aztecs ===
The Aztecs, representing San Diego State University in San Diego, California, were coached by Brian Dutcher in his sixth season. They were ranked No. 19 in the preseason AP Poll, and won their first three games of the season before heading to Hawaii for the Maui Invitational Tournament. There, they defeated Ohio State before losing to No. 14 Arizona and No. 9 Arkansas. They lost only one further non-conference game, a neutral-site contest against Saint Mary's, and entered conference play with nine wins and three losses (9–3). Games against New Mexico, Nevada, and Boise State were their only losses in conference play; the Aztecs finished the Mountain West Conference slate with a 24–6 overall record and a 15–3 conference record, good for the regular season conference championship and the No. 1 seed in the Mountain West tournament. In the conference tournament, they defeated Colorado State, San Jose State, and Utah State to claim the conference tournament championship, their third in six seasons under Dutcher.

San Diego State received the Mountain West's automatic invitation to the NCAA tournament by virtue of their conference tournament title and were seeded fifth in the South Regional. Their first- and second-round games were played at the Amway Center in Orlando, Florida; they faced No. 12 seed Charleston in their first game, resulting in an eight-point Aztec win. The other first-round game played in Orlando saw No. 13 seed Furman upset No. 4 seed Virginia, setting up a second-round Saturday matchup between San Diego State and Furman. This win sent them to the regional semifinal round for the third time; they faced No. 1 overall seed Alabama. The Aztecs upset Alabama after coming back from a 9-point deficit in the second half, and advanced to the Elite Eight for the first time; in doing so, they also became the first Mountain West Conference team to reach that round of the tournament. They advanced to the Final Four with a one-point win over No. 6 seed Creighton, and defeated No. 9 seed Florida Atlantic by one point on a last-second buzzer beater to advance to the national championship game. The Aztecs attempted to become the first mid-major program to win an NCAA Division I men's basketball championship since UNLV in 1990.

=== Connecticut Huskies ===
The Huskies, representing the University of Connecticut in Storrs, Connecticut, were coached by Dan Hurley in his fifth season. They were unranked to begin the season but entered the AP Poll at No. 25 after winning their first two games. At the Phil Knight Invitational in Portland, they defeated Oregon, No. 18 Alabama, and Iowa State. They finished their non-conference schedule with an 11–0 record and won their first three Big East Conference games before suffering their first loss at No. 22 Xavier. This started a skid for the Huskies in which they lost four of their next five games—their only ranked opponent during this streak was No. 25 Marquette—their lone win in this stretch was against Creighton. They defeated No. 10 Marquette later in the conference season, though dropped their next game at No. 23 Creighton. Ultimately, the Huskies finished the conference schedule with an overall record of 24–7, and conference record of 13–7, earning them the No. 4 seed in the Big East tournament. They defeated Providence, but bowed out of the tournament with a semifinal loss to Marquette the following day.

UConn received an at-large invitation to the NCAA tournament, and were placed in the West Regional as the No. 4 seed. Their first- and second-round games were played at MVP Arena in Albany, New York, shortly after making it to the semifinal round of the Big East conference tournament, traditionally held at New York City's Madison Square Garden, meaning that the Huskies stayed within New York State in the earlier part of March; their opening game was against No. 13 seed Iona, whom they defeated by 24 points. No. 5 seed Saint Mary's defeated No. 12 VCU in the other first-round game held in Albany, and the Huskies defeated Saint Mary's by 15 points in the second round, to advance to the regional semifinal. UConn defeated No. 8 seed Arkansas by 23 points in their third NCAA tournament game, and in the regional final, they defeated No. 3 seed Gonzaga by 28 points. They faced No. 5 seed Miami in the Final Four, and "cruised" to a 13-point win over the Hurricanes, to qualify for the national title game. This was the fifth NCAA championship game appearance for the Huskies, who had won all four prior games (1999, 2004, 2011, and 2014).

== Game summary ==
UConn won the game's opening tip and scored the game's first points with a field goal by Jordan Hawkins. San Diego State took their first lead on a three-point field goal by Lamont Butler; Darrion Trammell followed with a three-point shot of his own, putting the Aztecs ahead by four points. The teams traded jump shots for the next two minutes, and San Diego State led 10–8 at the first media timeout with 15:47 remaining in the first half. Adama Sanogo tied the game at ten points apiece with a jumper just over a minute later, and he made a layup after several possessions to return the lead to UConn. Following the latter basket, the game went two and a half minutes without any scoring; a dunk by Donovan Clingan with 11:28 was the next made shot and increased UConn's lead to four points. Three straight made field goals by Naheim Alleyne and Hawkins extended the Huskies' lead to ten points, and a three-pointer by Hawkins two minutes later made the score 26–14. After a Trammell jump shot brought San Diego State within nine points, but three straight field goals by Tristen Newton (the last of which was a three-pointer) pushed UConn's lead to sixteen points. Butler scored a three-point shot of his own immediately afterwards to push the Aztecs over the 20-point margin, and UConn led 36–20 at the time of the media timeout with 2:55 until halftime. The 16-point margin was two more than San Diego State's deficit in their last game against Florida Atlantic. The game went without scoring for nearly two minutes after resuming; Keshad Johnson ended this drought with a jump shot for San Diego State. Trammell's two-point shot with 36 seconds remaining were the final points of the first half, after UConn's final possession resulted in missed shots by Newton and Sanogo and a rebound by Mensah with no time remaining.

UConn began the second half with possession of the ball, though they did not score on their opening possession; Matt Bradley's jump shot marked the second half's opening score, though Sanogo's layup immediately afterwards ended San Diego State's run of six consecutive points. A pair of free throws by Trammell brought UConn's lead back down to ten points; Alex Karaban's three-point shot twenty seconds later made the score 41–28. Both teams traded a pair of free throws near sixteen minutes to play, and Adam Seiko made a three-pointer to once again return UConn's lead to ten points. The Aztecs went for nearly three minutes after that without scoring; in that period, Sanogo and Newton each made two free throws for the Huskies. Jaedon LeDee scored on either side of a media timeout with 11:56 remaining to narrow their deficit to 13 points, and a layup by Clingan was countered by a Butler three-point shot under thirty seconds later. The Huskies were able to extend their lead further after Joey Calcaterra made a three-point shot, though San Diego State responded with nine consecutive points from LeDee, Johnson, and Trammell. UConn put a stop to the run after Sanogo made a tip shot, bringing the score to 58–50 with 7:15 remaining in the contest. Both teams made several free throws over the next few minutes, and the Aztecs narrowed the deficit to 60–55. However, a three-pointer by Hawkins with five minutes remaining bumped UConn's lead to eight, and started a 9–0 Huskies run. UConn led 63–55 at the media timeout with 3:52 left. After the timeout, UConn scored six consecutive points—a run ended by a jump shot by Trammell—before Hawkins scored another layup and put his team back in the lead by 14 points. The teams traded free throws with under 90 seconds to play, and several further San Diego State fouls gave UConn more free throws; Hawkins made two and Jackson Jr. made one. After a missed jumper by San Diego State, UConn rebounded and was able to run out the clock and secure a 76–59 national championship victory.

UConn won its fifth championship in 25 years and remained unbeaten (5–0) in national title games. Sanogo was named Most Outstanding Player of the Final Four, and he capped his tournament performance with a 17-point, 10-rebound game in the championship, good for a double-double. Newton also finished with a double-double for the Huskies, scoring 19 points and securing 10 rebounds. Hawkins also scored 16. San Diego State was led by Johnson's 14 points. They shot just 32.2% from the field, and missed 14 consecutive shots in the first half, going 11 minutes without making a shot. The Aztecs were 7 1/2-point underdogs, the largest in a national championship game in the 2000s. The Huskies won all six of their tournament games by double-figures, achieved by only four other teams since the tournament's current format began in 1985.

Hawkins and Angel Reese became the first cousins to win championships on consecutive days, as Reese had led LSU to its first-ever women's basketball championship one day before.

CBS

April 3, 2023
8:20 p.m. CDT

Report

#S5 San Diego State Aztecs 59, #W4 UConn Huskies 76
Scoring by half: 24–36, 35–40
Pts: K. Johnson – 14; Rebs: N. Mensah – 6 Asts: L. Butler – 2	Pts: T. Newton – 19; Rebs: A. Sanogo, T. Newton – 10; Asts: A. Jackson Jr. – 6

NRG Stadium – Houston, Texas
Attendance: 72,423
Referees: Ron Groover, Keith Kimble, Terry Oglesby

Starters:			Pts	Reb	Ast
F	0	Keshad Johnson	14	4	1
F	31	Nathan Mensah	1	6	0
G	12	Darrion Trammell	13	3	1
G	5	Lamont Butler	13	4	2
G	20	Matt Bradley	8	3	1
Reserves:					
F	14	Cade Alger	0	0	0
F	33	Aguek Arop	0	4	1
F	13	Jaedon LeDee	7	4	1
G	3	Micah Parrish	0	3	1
G	2	Adam Seiko	3	2	0
Head coach:
Brian Dutcher

San Diego State	UConn

San Diego State	Statistics	UConn
19/59 (32%)	Field goals	23/53 (43%)
6/23 (26%)	3-pt field goals	6/17 (35%)
15/20 (75%)	Free throws	24/27 (88%)
12	Offensive rebounds	10
22	Defensive rebounds	30
34	Total rebounds	40
7	Assists	13
12	Turnovers	13
7	Steals	8
2	Blocks	6
20	Fouls	15

Starters:			Pts	Reb	Ast
F	11	Alex Karaban	5	5	0
F	21	Adama Sanogo	17	10	1
G	24	Jordan Hawkins	16	4	0
G	2	Tristen Newton	19	10	4
G	44	Andre Jackson Jr.	3	3	6
Reserves:					
C	32	Donovan Clingan	4	3	1
G	20	Andrew Hurley	0	1	0
G	4	Nahiem Alleyne	6	3	0
G	3	Joey Calcaterra	6	1	1
Head coach:
Dan Hurley

== Media coverage ==
The championship game was televised in the United States by CBS. Jim Nantz provided play-by-play, while Bill Raftery and Grant Hill both provided color commentary. Tracy Wolfson served as the sideline reporter. Former college basketball referee Gene Steratore provided rules analysis throughout the game. This was the final national championship game that Nantz would call for CBS Sports, as he retired from calling live games in the NCAA Tournament following this game; coincidentally, this game took place close to the campus of the University of Houston, where Nantz originally got started in broadcasting. Ian Eagle replaced Nantz the following season.

== See also ==
- 2023 NCAA Division I women's basketball championship game, which also took place in Texas.
