= Adama Sanogo =

Malian basketball player (born 2002)

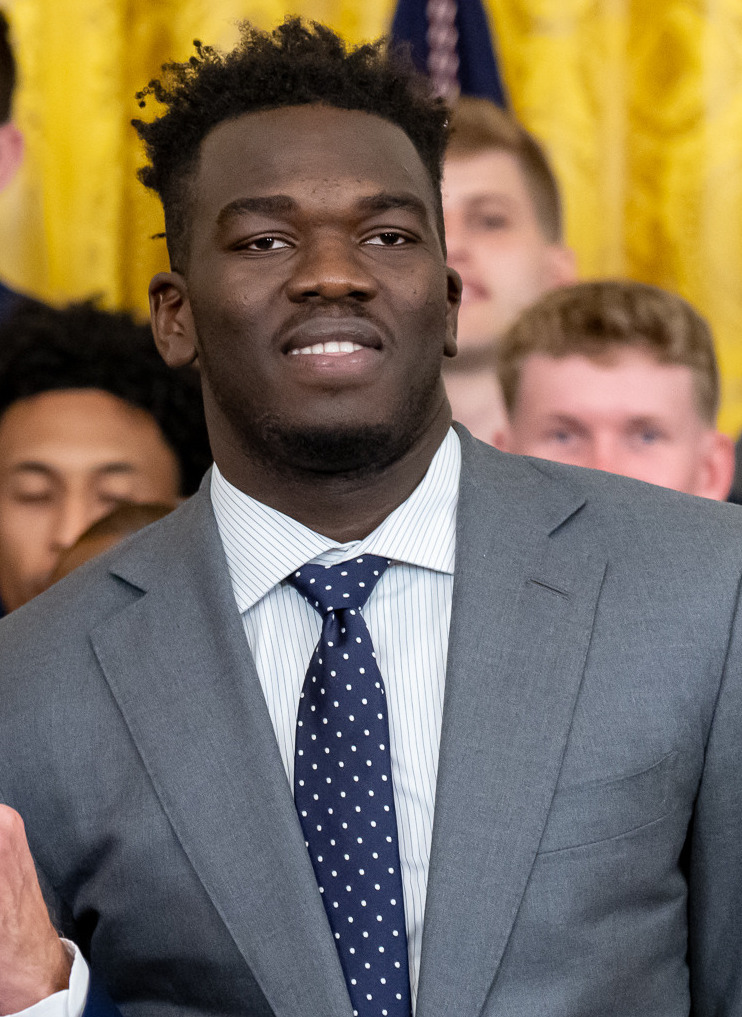
- Sanogo in 2023

No. 15 – Hapoel Holon
- Position: Power forward / center
- League: Israeli Basketball Premier League; FIBA Champions League

Personal information
- Born: 12 February 2002 (age 24) Bamako, Mali
- Listed height: 6 ft 9 in (2.06 m)
- Listed weight: 245 lb (111 kg)

Career information
- High school: Our Savior New American (Centereach, New York); The Patrick School (Hillside, New Jersey)
- College: UConn (2020–2023)
- NBA draft: 2023: undrafted
- Playing career: 2023–present

Career history
- 2023–2025: Chicago Bulls
- 2023–2025: →Windy City Bulls
- 2025: Trapani Shark
- 2026–present: Hapoel Holon

Career highlights
- All-NBA G League Third Team (2024); NBA G League All-Rookie Team (2024); NBA G League Next Up Game (2024); NCAA champion (2023); NCAA Final Four Most Outstanding Player (2023); 2× First-team All-Big East (2022, 2023); Big East All-Freshman Team (2021)
- Stats at NBA.com
- Stats at Basketball Reference
Medals
Men's basketball
Representing Mali
FIBA Under-16 African Championship
Gold medal – first place	2017 Mauritius	Team

Adama Sanogo (born 12 February 2002) is a Malian professional basketball player for Hapoel Holon of the Israeli Basketball Premier League and the Basketball Champions League. In 2023 he won the national championship with the UConn Huskies and was named the Final Four's Most Outstanding Player.

== Early life and high school career ==
Sanogo grew up in Bamako, Mali, and first played soccer before switching to basketball in 2014. His uncle, basketball scout Tidiane Dramé, convinced him to start playing basketball. One year later, Sanogo moved to the United States to play for Our Savior New American School in Centereach, New York. He transferred to The Patrick School in Hillside, New Jersey, due to a coaching change at his previous school. In his senior season, he averaged 13.3 points and 10.5 rebounds per game. Sanogo competed for the New York Rens on the Amateur Athletic Union circuit. A consensus four-star recruit, he committed to playing college basketball for UConn over offers from Seton Hall and Nebraska.

== College career ==
Sanogo became a starter in the third game of his freshman season at UConn. On 3 March 2021, he recorded a season-high 16 points, nine rebounds and two blocks in a 69–58 win over Seton Hall. As a freshman, Sanogo averaged 7.3 points and 4.8 rebounds per game, earning Big East All-Freshman Team honors. On 24 November 2021, he scored a career-high 30 points in a 115–109 double overtime win against Auburn. On 1 December, Sanogo suffered an abdominal injury during a 72–63 win versus Maryland Eastern Shore Hawks and was ruled out for several weeks. He was named to the First Team All-Big East.

On 4 April 2023, Sanogo won the national championship with UConn and was named the Final Four's Most Outstanding Player. He became the first African-born player since Hakeem Olajuwon (1983) to win the award.

== Professional career ==
=== Chicago Bulls / Windy City Bulls (2023–2025) ===
After going undrafted in the 2023 NBA draft, Sanogo signed a two-way contract with the Chicago Bulls on 10 July 2023.

On December 28, 2023, Sanogo made his NBA debut for the Bulls in a 120–104 loss to the Indiana Pacers. In the next game he played with for Chicago, on January 2, 2024, Sanogo put up 8 points, 4 rebounds, and a season-high 6 assists in a 110–97 loss to the Philadelphia 76ers. In what became only his 9th NBA game played on April 12, Sanogo recorded a 20/20 double-double with 22 points and 20 rebounds (including 10 offensive rebounds) in a 129–127 win over the Washington Wizards, becoming the first rookie since Earl Williams in 1975 to record a 20-point, 20-rebound game off the bench.

On July 6, 2024, Sanogo signed another two-way contract with the Bulls. On February 19, 2025, he was waived by the Bulls.

=== Trapani Shark (2025) ===
On July 25, 2025, Sanogo signed with Trapani Shark of the Lega Basket Serie A (LBA). In 13 games, he averaged 12.2 minutes, 6.0 points, and 3.7 rebounds per game.

=== Hapoel Holon (2026–present) ===
On January 19, 2026, Sanogo signed with Hapoel Holon of the Israeli Basketball Premier League. On October 16, 2026, he received the Basketball Champions League Player of the Week for Week 2. He had 28 points, 5 blocks, and 4 rebounds. This stat line made him the first player in league history to record at least 25 points and five blocks in a single game.

== National team career ==
Sanogo won a gold medal representing Mali at the 2017 FIBA Under-16 African Championship in Mauritius, averaging 10.5 points and eight rebounds per game. At the 2018 FIBA Under-17 World Cup, he averaged six points and seven rebounds per game.

== Career statistics ==
Legend
GP	Games played	GS	Games started	MPG	Minutes per game
FG%	Field goal percentage	3P%	3-point field goal percentage	FT%	Free throw percentage
RPG	Rebounds per game	APG	Assists per game	SPG	Steals per game
BPG	Blocks per game	PPG	Points per game	**Bold**	Career high

=== NBA ===
Year	Team	GP	GS	MPG	FG%	3P%	FT%	RPG	APG	SPG	BPG	PPG
2023–24	Chicago	**9**	0	**7.3**	.519	—	.667	**4.0**	.0	**.1**	.0	**4.0**
2024–25	Chicago	4	0	5.4	**.571**	—	—	1.5	.3	.0	.0	2.0
Career		13	0	6.7	.529	—	.667	3.2	.1	.1	.0	3.4

=== College ===
Year	Team	GP	GS	MPG	FG%	3P%	FT%	RPG	APG	SPG	BPG	PPG
2020–21	UConn	23	20	17.0	.554	–	.577	4.8	.6	.4	.9	7.3
2021–22	UConn	29	28	**29.2**	.504	.000	.686	**8.8**	1.0	**.9**	**1.9**	14.8
2022–23	UConn	**39**	**39**	26.5	**.606**	**.365**	**.766**	7.7	**1.3**	.7	.8	**17.2**
Career		91	87	25.0	.560	.358	.715	7.3	1.0	.7	1.2	13.9

== Personal life ==
Sanogo is the son of Cheickne Sanogo and Awa Traore, and has four sisters and one brother. He is a practicing Muslim, so, due to the timing of Ramadan in 2023, he was fasting during the NCAA tournament.
