= 2023 NCAA Division I men's basketball tournament =

American college basketball tournament

- Season: 2022–23
- Teams: 68
- Finals site: NRG Stadium, Houston, Texas
- Champions: UConn Huskies (5th title, 5th title game, 6th Final Four)
- Runner-up: San Diego State Aztecs (1st title game, 1st Final Four)
- Semifinalists: Florida Atlantic Owls (1st Final Four); Miami Hurricanes (1st Final Four)
- Winning coach: Dan Hurley (1st title)
- MOP: Adama Sanogo (UConn)
- Attendance: 722,121
- Top scorer: Adama Sanogo (UConn) (118 points)

The 2023 NCAA Division I men's basketball tournament involved 68 teams playing in a single-elimination tournament that determined the National Collegiate Athletic Association (NCAA) Division I men's basketball national champion for the 2022–23 season. The 84th annual edition of the tournament began on March 14, 2023, and concluded with the UConn Huskies defeating the San Diego State Aztecs, 76–59 in the championship game on April 3 at NRG Stadium in Houston, Texas.

ASUN champion Kennesaw State made its NCAA tournament debut, while Southern Conference champion Furman made its first NCAA appearance since 1980. Another school, Texas Southern, won the SWAC tournament to become the third 20-loss team to make the field, after the Coppin State Eagles in 2008 and Liberty Flames in 2013. It was also Texas Southern's 3rd consecutive NCAA tournament.

This tournament featured several notable upsets. For only the second time in history, a 16-seed defeated a 1-seed, when Fairleigh Dickinson upset Purdue in the first round 63–58 in Columbus. For the third consecutive year, and seventh time since 2012, a 15-seed defeated a 2-seed in the tournament, when 15-seeded Princeton defeated 2-seed Arizona 59–55 in Sacramento for the Tigers' first tournament win since 1998. Arizona became the first team to lose to a 15-seed team twice, with the first loss being against the Santa Clara Broncos in 1993. Additionally, Princeton subsequently defeated Missouri in the second round to advance to the Sweet 16, marking the third consecutive year where a 15-seed reach the regional semifinals. It was also the 15th consecutive tournament since 2007 where a double-digit seed made the regional semifinals. Additionally, Virginia was knocked out in the first round as a top-four seed for the second consecutive year, and the third time in five years as a 4-seed when they were upset by 13-seed Furman.

The defending national champions Kansas Jayhawks were eliminated in the second round, against the Arkansas Razorbacks, becoming the sixth consecutive tournament where the defending champion failed to make the Sweet Sixteen.

This was also the first NCAA tournament in which all of the top seeds failed to make the Elite Eight, after Alabama and Houston's eliminations in the Sweet Sixteen. This year also had the fewest combined 1- and 2-seeds left in the Elite Eight in tournament history, with only 2-seed Texas remaining.

For the first time since 1970, three teams made their first Final Four appearance in this tournament. Those three teams were Florida Atlantic, who defeated 3-seed Kansas State to join Wichita State as the only 9-seeds to advance to the Final Four since the tournament expanded to 64 teams in 1985, San Diego State, and Miami (FL), who both advanced to their first Final Four in program history. FAU also became the first team since George Mason in 2006 to make the Final Four in the same season that it earned its first NCAA tournament win. This is also the third Final Four without any 1-seeds since the tournament expanded to 64 teams in 1985, with the first two being in 2006 and 2011, the second time without any 1 or 2 seeds (2011), and the first time in Final Four history without any teams seeded 1–3. The highest seeded team in the Final Four was #4 seed UConn. With FAU (Conference USA) and SDSU (Mountain West Conference), the Final Four had two mid-major teams for the first time since 2011's Butler and VCU.

The 2023 Final Four was also marked by its lack of highly touted high school prospects. For the first time since the NCAA began seeding the tournament in 1979, no former McDonald's All-American participated in the Final Four. Of the rotation players on the Final Four teams (those receiving regular playing time), the highest-ranked in the composite recruiting rankings of 247Sports was UConn's Jordan Hawkins, who was #51 in the 2021 class. Only eight rotation players in the Final Four were even ranked in the top 100; by contrast, 12 players were unranked in high school. Two teams, Florida Atlantic and San Diego State, had no top-100 players, with FAU's nine-man rotation featuring six unranked players and only one in the top 200.

For the second consecutive year, a school that won a conference championship was ineligible to compete in the NCAA tournament because they were in transition to Division I. Fairleigh Dickinson was awarded the Northeast Conference bid due to Merrimack's ineligibility.

== Procedures ==
A total of 68 teams participated in the tournament with 32 automatic bids being filled by each program that won its conference tournament. The remaining 36 bids were issued "at-large", with selections extended by the NCAA Selection Committee on Selection Sunday, March 12. The Selection Committee also seeded the entire field from 1 to 68.

Eight teams (the four-lowest seeded automatic qualifiers and the four lowest-seeded at-large teams) played in the First Four. The winners of those games advanced to the main tournament bracket.

First Four Out
| NET | School | Conference | Record |
|---|---|---|---|
| 43 | Oklahoma State | Big 12 | 18–15 |
| 40 | Rutgers | Big Ten | 19–14 |
| 46 | North Carolina | ACC | 20–13 |
| 60 | Clemson | ACC | 23–10 |

== Schedule and venues ==
The following are the sites selected to host the each round of the 2023 tournament:

2023 First Four (orange) and first and second rounds (green)
2023 Regionals (blue) and Final Four (red)

First Four

- March 14 and 15
  - University of Dayton Arena, Dayton, Ohio (Host: University of Dayton)

First and second rounds (subregionals)

- March 16 and 18
  - Amway Center, Orlando, Florida (Host: University of Central Florida)
  - Legacy Arena, Birmingham, Alabama (Host: Southeastern Conference)
  - Wells Fargo Arena, Des Moines, Iowa (Host: Drake University)
  - Golden 1 Center, Sacramento, California (Host: California State University, Sacramento)
- March 17 and 19
  - MVP Arena, Albany, New York (Hosts: Siena College, Metro Atlantic Athletic Conference)
  - Greensboro Coliseum, Greensboro, North Carolina (Host: Atlantic Coast Conference)
  - Nationwide Arena, Columbus, Ohio (Host: Ohio State University)
  - Ball Arena, Denver, Colorado (Host: Mountain West Conference)

Regional semi-finals and finals (Sweet Sixteen and Elite Eight)

- March 23 and 25
  - East regional
    - Madison Square Garden, New York, New York (Hosts: Big East Conference, St. John's University)
  - West regional
    - T-Mobile Arena, Las Vegas, Nevada (Host: University of Nevada, Las Vegas)
- March 24 and 26
  - South regional
    - KFC Yum! Center, Louisville, Kentucky (Host: University of Louisville)
  - Midwest regional
    - T-Mobile Center, Kansas City, Missouri (Host: Big 12 Conference)

National semi-finals and championship (Final Four)

- April 1 and 3
  - NRG Stadium, Houston, Texas (Hosts: University of Houston, Rice University, Houston Christian University, Texas Southern University)

Houston hosted the Final Four for the fourth time, having previously hosted in 1971, 2011, and 2016.

== Qualification and selection of teams ==
Teams that participated in the 2023 tournament by region. South Region (red), East Region (blue), Midwest Region (green), and West Region (purple)

=== Automatic qualifiers ===
Automatic qualifiers
| Conference | Team | Appearance | Last bid |
|---|---|---|---|
| America East | Vermont | 9th | 2022 |
| American | Memphis | 28th | 2022 |
| Atlantic 10 | VCU | 18th | 2021 |
| ACC | Duke | 45th | 2022 |
| ASUN | Kennesaw State | 1st | Never |
| Big 12 | Texas | 37th | 2022 |
| Big East | Marquette | 35th | 2022 |
| Big Sky | Montana State | 5th | 2022 |
| Big South | UNC Asheville | 5th | 2016 |
| Big Ten | Purdue | 34th | 2022 |
| Big West | UC Santa Barbara | 7th | 2021 |
| CAA | Charleston | 6th | 2018 |
| C-USA | Florida Atlantic | 2nd | 2002 |
| Horizon | Northern Kentucky | 3rd | 2019 |
| Ivy League | Princeton | 26th | 2017 |
| MAAC | Iona | 16th | 2021 |
| MAC | Kent State | 7th | 2017 |
| MEAC | Howard | 3rd | 1992 |
| Missouri Valley | Drake | 6th | 2021 |
| Mountain West | San Diego State | 15th | 2022 |
| NEC | Fairleigh Dickinson (Note: Despite losing the NEC championship game to regular-season champion Merrimack, Fairleigh Dickinson received the NEC's automatic bid because Merrimack was ineligible for the NCAA tournament due to being in the final year of its transition from Division II.) | 7th | 2019 |
| Ohio Valley | Southeast Missouri State | 2nd | 2000 |
| Pac-12 | Arizona | 37th | 2022 |
| Patriot | Colgate | 6th | 2022 |
| SEC | Alabama | 24th | 2022 |
| Southern | Furman | 7th | 1980 |
| Southland | Texas A&M–Corpus Christi | 3rd | 2022 |
| SWAC | Texas Southern | 11th | 2022 |
| Summit League | Oral Roberts | 7th | 2021 |
| Sun Belt | Louisiana | 9th | 2014 |
| WCC | Gonzaga | 25th | 2022 |
| WAC | Grand Canyon | 2nd | 2021 |

=== Seeds ===
The tournament seeds and regions were determined through the NCAA basketball tournament selection process and were published by the selection committee after the brackets were released.

South Regional – KFC Yum! Center, Louisville, KY
| Seed | School | Conference | Record | Overall Seed | Berth type | Last bid |
|---|---|---|---|---|---|---|
| 1 | Alabama | SEC | 29–5 | 1 | Automatic | 2022 |
| 2 | Arizona | Pac–12 | 28–6 | 7 | Automatic | 2022 |
| 3 | Baylor | Big 12 | 22–10 | 9 | At large | 2022 |
| 4 | Virginia | ACC | 25–7 | 16 | At large | 2021 |
| 5 | San Diego State | Mountain West | 27–6 | 17 | Automatic | 2022 |
| 6 | Creighton | Big East | 21–12 | 22 | At large | 2022 |
| 7 | Missouri | SEC | 24–9 | 27 | At large | 2021 |
| 8 | Maryland | Big Ten | 21–12 | 31 | At large | 2021 |
| 9 | West Virginia | Big 12 | 19–14 | 34 | At large | 2021 |
| 10 | Utah State | Mountain West | 26–8 | 40 | At large | 2021 |
| 11 | NC State | ACC | 23–10 | 41 | At large | 2018 |
| 12 | Charleston | Colonial | 31–3 | 47 | Automatic | 2018 |
| 13 | Furman | Southern | 27–7 | 53 | Automatic | 1980 |
| 14 | UC Santa Barbara | Big West | 27–7 | 56 | Automatic | 2021 |
| 15 | Princeton | Ivy | 21–8 | 61 | Automatic | 2017 |
| 16* | Texas A&M–Corpus Christi | Southland | 23–10 | 65 | Automatic | 2022 |
| 16* | Southeast Missouri State | Ohio Valley | 19–16 | 67 | Automatic | 2000 |

East Regional – Madison Square Garden, New York, NY
| Seed | School | Conference | Record | Overall Seed | Berth type | Last bid |
|---|---|---|---|---|---|---|
| 1 | Purdue | Big Ten | 29–5 | 4 | Automatic | 2022 |
| 2 | Marquette | Big East | 28–6 | 8 | Automatic | 2022 |
| 3 | Kansas State | Big 12 | 23–9 | 11 | At large | 2019 |
| 4 | Tennessee | SEC | 23–10 | 14 | At large | 2022 |
| 5 | Duke | ACC | 26–8 | 18 | Automatic | 2022 |
| 6 | Kentucky | SEC | 21–11 | 23 | At large | 2022 |
| 7 | Michigan State | Big Ten | 19–12 | 26 | At large | 2022 |
| 8 | Memphis | American | 26–8 | 29 | Automatic | 2022 |
| 9 | Florida Atlantic | C-USA | 31–3 | 33 | Automatic | 2002 |
| 10 | USC | Pac–12 | 22–10 | 39 | At large | 2022 |
| 11 | Providence | Big East | 21–11 | 42 | At large | 2022 |
| 12 | Oral Roberts | Summit | 30–4 | 48 | Automatic | 2021 |
| 13 | Louisiana | Sun Belt | 26–7 | 54 | Automatic | 2014 |
| 14 | Montana State | Big Sky | 25–9 | 58 | Automatic | 2022 |
| 15 | Vermont | America East | 23–10 | 59 | Automatic | 2022 |
| 16* | Texas Southern | SWAC | 14–20 | 66 | Automatic | 2022 |
| 16* | Fairleigh Dickinson | Northeast | 19–15 | 68 | Automatic | 2019 |

Midwest Regional – T-Mobile Center, Kansas City, MO
| Seed | School | Conference | Record | Overall Seed | Berth type | Last bid |
|---|---|---|---|---|---|---|
| 1 | Houston | American | 31–3 | 2 | At large | 2022 |
| 2 | Texas | Big 12 | 26–8 | 6 | Automatic | 2022 |
| 3 | Xavier | Big East | 25–9 | 12 | At large | 2018 |
| 4 | Indiana | Big Ten | 22–11 | 15 | At large | 2022 |
| 5 | Miami (FL) | ACC | 25–7 | 20 | At large | 2022 |
| 6 | Iowa State | Big 12 | 19–13 | 21 | At large | 2022 |
| 7 | Texas A&M | SEC | 25–9 | 25 | At large | 2018 |
| 8 | Iowa | Big Ten | 19–13 | 32 | At large | 2022 |
| 9 | Auburn | SEC | 20–12 | 35 | At large | 2022 |
| 10 | Penn State | Big Ten | 22–13 | 38 | At large | 2011 |
| 11* | Mississippi State | SEC | 21–12 | 43 | At large | 2019 |
| 11* | Pittsburgh | ACC | 22–11 | 44 | At large | 2016 |
| 12 | Drake | Missouri Valley | 27–7 | 49 | Automatic | 2021 |
| 13 | Kent State | MAC | 28–6 | 51 | Automatic | 2017 |
| 14 | Kennesaw State | ASUN | 26–8 | 55 | Automatic | Never |
| 15 | Colgate | Patriot | 26–8 | 60 | Automatic | 2022 |
| 16 | Northern Kentucky | Horizon | 22–12 | 63 | Automatic | 2019 |

West Regional – T-Mobile Arena, Las Vegas, NV
| Seed | School | Conference | Record | Overall Seed | Berth type | Last bid |
|---|---|---|---|---|---|---|
| 1 | Kansas | Big 12 | 27–7 | 3 | At large | 2022 |
| 2 | UCLA | Pac–12 | 29–5 | 5 | At large | 2022 |
| 3 | Gonzaga | West Coast | 28–5 | 10 | Automatic | 2022 |
| 4 | UConn | Big East | 25–8 | 13 | At large | 2022 |
| 5 | Saint Mary's | West Coast | 26–7 | 19 | At large | 2022 |
| 6 | TCU | Big 12 | 21–12 | 24 | At large | 2022 |
| 7 | Northwestern | Big Ten | 21–11 | 28 | At large | 2017 |
| 8 | Arkansas | SEC | 20–13 | 30 | At large | 2022 |
| 9 | Illinois | Big Ten | 20–12 | 36 | At large | 2022 |
| 10 | Boise State | Mountain West | 24–9 | 37 | At large | 2022 |
| 11* | Arizona State | Pac–12 | 22–12 | 45 | At large | 2019 |
| 11* | Nevada | Mountain West | 22–10 | 46 | At large | 2019 |
| 12 | VCU | Atlantic 10 | 27–7 | 50 | Automatic | 2021 |
| 13 | Iona | MAAC | 27–7 | 52 | Automatic | 2021 |
| 14 | Grand Canyon | WAC | 24–11 | 57 | Automatic | 2021 |
| 15 | UNC Asheville | Big South | 27–7 | 62 | Automatic | 2016 |
| 16 | Howard | MEAC | 22–12 | 64 | Automatic | 1992 |

*See First Four

== Tournament bracket ==
All times are listed in Eastern Daylight Time (UTC−4)

=== First Four – Dayton, OH ===
The First Four games involve eight teams: the four lowest-seeded automatic qualifiers and the four lowest-seeded at-large teams.

| March 14 – South Regional |
| 16 | Texas A&M–Corpus Christi | 75 |
| 16 | SE Missouri State | 71 |

| March 14 – Midwest Regional |
| 11 | Mississippi State | 59 |
| 11 | Pittsburgh | 60 |

| March 15 – East Regional |
| 16 | Texas Southern | 61 |
| 16 | Fairleigh Dickinson | 84 |

| March 15 – West Regional |
| 11 | Arizona State | 98 |
| 11 | Nevada | 73 |

=== South regional – KFC Yum! Center, Louisville, KY ===
First round Round of 64; March 16–17
1 | Alabama | 96
16 | Texas A&M–Corpus Christi | 75
Birmingham – Thu/Sat
8 | Maryland | 67
9 | West Virginia | 65
5 | San Diego State | 63
12 | Charleston | 57
Orlando – Thu/Sat
4 | Virginia | 67
13 | Furman | 68
6 | Creighton | 72
11 | NC State | 63
Denver – Fri/Sun
3 | Baylor | 74
14 | UC Santa Barbara | 56
7 | Missouri | 76
10 | Utah State | 65
Sacramento – Thu/Sat
2 | Arizona | 55
15 | Princeton | 59

Second round Round of 32; March 18–19
1 | Alabama | 73
8 | Maryland | 51
5 | San Diego State | 75
13 | Furman | 52
6 | Creighton | 85
3 | Baylor | 76
7 | Missouri | 63
15 | Princeton | 78

Regional semifinals Sweet 16; March 24
1 | Alabama | 64
5 | San Diego State | 71
6 | Creighton | 86
15 | Princeton | 75

Regional Final; Elite 8 March 26
5 | San Diego State | 57
6 | Creighton | 56

==== South regional final ====
CBS

March 26
2:20 pm EDT

No. 6 Creighton Bluejays 56, No. 5 San Diego State Aztecs 57
Scoring by half: 33–28, 23–29
| Pts: Ryan Kalkbrenner, 17; Rebs: Baylor Scheierman, 9 Asts: Baylor Scheierman, 4 | Pts: Lamont Butler, 18; Rebs: Nathan Mensah, 6 Asts: tied, 2 |

KFC Yum! Center – Louisville, Kentucky
Attendance: 20,051
Referees: Joe Lindsay, Michael Irving, Lee Cassell

==== South regional all-tournament team ====
- Lamont Butler - San Diego State
- Tosan Evbuomwan - Princeton
- Ryan Kalkbrenner - Creighton
- Baylor Scheierman - Creighton
- Darrion Trammell (MOP) – San Diego State

=== East regional – Madison Square Garden, New York, NY ===
First round Round of 64; March 16–17
1 | Purdue | 58
16 | Fairleigh Dickinson | 63
Columbus – Fri/Sun
8 | Memphis | 65
9 | Florida Atlantic | 66
5 | Duke | 74
12 | Oral Roberts | 51
Orlando – Thu/Sat
4 | Tennessee | 58
13 | Louisiana | 55
6 | Kentucky | 61
11 | Providence | 53
Greensboro – Fri/Sun
3 | Kansas State | 77
14 | Montana State | 65
7 | Michigan State | 72
10 | USC | 62
Columbus – Fri/Sun
2 | Marquette | 78
15 | Vermont | 61

Second round Round of 32; March 18–19
16 | Fairleigh Dickinson | 70
9 | Florida Atlantic | 78
5 | Duke | 52
4 | Tennessee | 65
6 | Kentucky | 69
3 | Kansas State | 75
7 | Michigan State | 69
2 | Marquette | 60

Regional semifinals Sweet 16; March 23
9 | Florida Atlantic | 62
4 | Tennessee | 55
3 | Kansas State | 98^{OT}
7 | Michigan State | 93

Regional Final; Elite 8 March 25
9 | Florida Atlantic | 79
3 | Kansas State | 76

==== East regional final ====
TBS

March 25
6:09 pm EDT

No. 9 Florida Atlantic Owls 79, No. 3 Kansas State Wildcats 76
Scoring by half: 42–38, 37–38
| Pts: Alijah Martin, 17; Rebs: Vladislav Goldin, 13; Asts: Johnell Davis, 6 | Pts: Markquis Nowell, 30; Rebs: Nae’Qwan Tomlin, 6 Asts: Markquis Nowell, 12 |

Madison Square Garden – New York, New York
Attendance: 19,680
Referees: Doug Sirmons, Doug Shows, Earl Walton

==== East regional all-tournament team ====
- Johnell Davis – Florida Atlantic
- Vladislav Goldin – Florida Atlantic
- AJ Hoggard – Michigan State
- Keyontae Johnson – Kansas State
- Markquis Nowell (MOP) – Kansas State

=== Midwest regional – T-Mobile Center, Kansas City, MO ===
First round Round of 64; March 16–17
1 | Houston | 63
16 | Northern Kentucky | 52
Birmingham – Thu/Sat
8 | Iowa | 75
9 | Auburn | 83
5 | Miami (FL) | 63
12 | Drake | 56
Albany – Fri/Sun
4 | Indiana | 71
13 | Kent State | 60
6 | Iowa State | 41
11 | Pittsburgh | 59
Greensboro – Fri/Sun
3 | Xavier | 72
14 | Kennesaw State | 67
7 | Texas A&M | 59
10 | Penn State | 76
Des Moines – Thu/Sat
2 | Texas | 81
15 | Colgate | 61

Second round Round of 32; March 18–19
1 | Houston | 81
9 | Auburn | 64
5 | Miami (FL) | 85
4 | Indiana | 69
11 | Pittsburgh | 73
3 | Xavier | 84
10 | Penn State | 66
2 | Texas | 71

Regional semifinals Sweet 16; March 24
1 | Houston | 75
5 | Miami (FL) | 89
3 | Xavier | 71
2 | Texas | 83

Regional Final; Elite 8 March 26
5 | Miami (FL) | 88
2 | Texas | 81

==== Midwest regional final ====
CBS

March 26
4:05 pm CDT

No. 5 Miami Hurricanes 88, No. 2 Texas Longhorns 81
Scoring by half: 37–45, 51–36
| Pts: Jordan Miller, 27; Rebs: Norchad Omier, 9 Asts: Wooga Poplar, 4 | Pts: Marcus Carr, 17; Rebs: Brock Cunningham, 8 Asts: Marcus Carr, 6 |

T-Mobile Center – Kansas City, Missouri
Attendance: 17,530
Referees: Ron Groover, Pat Adams, Brent Hampton

==== Midwest regional all-tournament team ====
- Timmy Allen – Texas
- Marcus Carr – Texas
- Jordan Miller – Miami (FL)
- Nijel Pack (MOP) – Miami (FL)
- Isaiah Wong – Miami (FL)

=== West regional – T-Mobile Arena, Las Vegas, NV ===
First round Round of 64; March 16–17
1 | Kansas | 96
16 | Howard | 68
Des Moines – Thu/Sat
8 | Arkansas | 73
9 | Illinois | 63
5 | Saint Mary's | 63
12 | VCU | 51
Albany – Fri/Sun
4 | UConn | 87
13 | Iona | 63
6 | TCU | 72
11 | Arizona State | 70
Denver – Fri/Sun
3 | Gonzaga | 82
14 | Grand Canyon | 70
7 | Northwestern | 75
10 | Boise State | 67
Sacramento – Thu/Sat
2 | UCLA | 86
15 | UNC Asheville | 53

Second round Round of 32; March 18–19
1 | Kansas | 71
8 | Arkansas | 72
5 | Saint Mary's | 55
4 | UConn | 70
6 | TCU | 81
3 | Gonzaga | 84
7 | Northwestern | 63
2 | UCLA | 68

Regional semifinals Sweet 16; March 23
8 | Arkansas | 65
4 | UConn | 88
3 | Gonzaga | 79
2 | UCLA | 76

Regional Final; Elite 8 March 25
4 | UConn | 82
3 | Gonzaga | 54

==== West regional final ====
TBS

March 25
5:49 pm PDT

No. 4 UConn Huskies 82, No. 3 Gonzaga Bulldogs 54
Scoring by half: 39–32, 43–22
| Pts: Jordan Hawkins, 20; Rebs: Adama Sanogo, 10; Asts: Andre Jackson Jr., 10 | Pts: Drew Timme, 12; Rebs: Drew Timme, 10; Asts: Nolan Hickman, 5 |

T-Mobile Arena – Las Vegas, Nevada
Attendance: 18,119
Referees: Keith Kimble, John Gaffney, Mike Reed

==== West regional all-tournament team ====
- Jordan Hawkins (MOP) – UConn
- Jaime Jaquez Jr. – UCLA
- Adama Sanogo – UConn
- Julian Strawther – Gonzaga
- Drew Timme – Gonzaga

=== Final Four – Houston, Texas ===
National Semifinals; Final Four; Saturday, April 1
S5 | San Diego State | 72
E9 | Florida Atlantic | 71
MW5 | Miami (FL) | 59
W4 | UConn | 72

National Championship Game; Monday, April 3
S5 | San Diego State | 59
W4 | UConn | 76

==== National semifinals ====
CBS

April 1
5:09 p.m. CDT

#E9 Florida Atlantic Owls 71, #S5 San Diego State Aztecs 72
Scoring by half: 40–33, 31–39
| Pts: Alijah Martin, 26; Rebs: tied, 7 Asts: Giancarlo Rosado, 3 | Pts: Matt Bradley, 21; Rebs: tied, 6 Asts: Lamont Butler, 3 |

NRG Stadium – Houston, TX
Attendance: 73,860
Referees: John Higgins, Kipp Kissinger, Bert Smith

CBS

April 1
7:49 p.m. CDT

#M5 Miami Hurricanes 59, #W4 UConn Huskies 72
Scoring by half: 24–37, 35–35
| Pts: Isaiah Wong, 15; Rebs: Jordan Miller, 10; Asts: Jordan Miller, 3 | Pts: Adama Sanogo, 21; Rebs: Adama Sanogo, 10; Asts: Tristen Newton, 8 |

NRG Stadium – Houston, TX
Attendance: 73,860
Referees: Roger Ayers, Doug Sirmons, Jeffrey Anderson

==== National championship ====
CBS

April 3, 2023
8:20 p.m. CDT

Report

#S5 San Diego State Aztecs 59, #W4 UConn Huskies 76
Scoring by half: 24–36, 35–40
| Pts: K. Johnson – 14; Rebs: N. Mensah – 6 Asts: L. Butler – 2 | Pts: T. Newton – 19; Rebs: A. Sanogo, T. Newton – 10; Asts: A. Jackson Jr. – 6 |

NRG Stadium – Houston, Texas
Attendance: 72,423
Referees: Ron Groover, Keith Kimble, Terry Oglesby

==== Final Four all-tournament team ====
- Lamont Butler – San Diego State
- Jordan Hawkins – UConn
- Alijah Martin – Florida Atlantic
- Tristen Newton – UConn
- Adama Sanogo (MOP) – UConn

== Notes and game summaries ==
=== Upsets ===
Per the NCAA, "Upsets are defined as when the winner of the game was seeded five or more places lower than the team it defeated."

The 2023 tournament saw a total of 9 upsets, with four in the first round, three in the second round, one in the Sweet Sixteen, and one in the Elite Eight.

Upsets in the 2023 NCAA Division I men's basketball tournament
| Round | West | Midwest | South | East |
|---|---|---|---|---|
| Round of 64 | None | No. 11 Pittsburgh defeated No. 6 Iowa State, 59–41 | No. 13 Furman defeated No. 4 Virginia, 68–67; No. 15 Princeton defeated No. 2 Arizona, 59–55 | No. 16 Fairleigh Dickinson defeated No. 1 Purdue, 63–58 |
| Round of 32 | No. 8 Arkansas defeated No. 1 Kansas, 72–71 | None | No. 15 Princeton defeated No. 7 Missouri, 78–63 | No. 7 Michigan State defeated No. 2 Marquette, 69–60 |
| Sweet 16 | None | | | No. 9 Florida Atlantic defeated No. 4 Tennessee, 62–55 |
| Elite 8 | None | | | No. 9 Florida Atlantic defeated No. 3 Kansas State, 79–76 |
| Final 4 | None | | | |
| National Championship | None | | | |

== Record by conference ==
| Conference | Bids | Record | Win % | FF | R64 | R32 | S16 | E8 | F4 | CG | NC |
|---|---|---|---|---|---|---|---|---|---|---|---|
| Big East | 5 | 12–4 | .750 | – | 5 | 4 | 3 | 2 | 1 | 1 | 1 |
| Mountain West | 4 | 5–4 | .556 | 1 | 3 | 1 | 1 | 1 | 1 | 1 | – |
| C-USA | 1 | 4–1 | .800 | – | 1 | 1 | 1 | 1 | 1 | – | – |
| Atlantic Coast | 5 | 7–5 | .583 | 1 | 5 | 3 | 1 | 1 | 1 | – | – |
| Big 12 | 7 | 9–7 | .563 | – | 7 | 5 | 2 | 2 | – | – | – |
| West Coast | 2 | 4–2 | .667 | – | 2 | 2 | 1 | 1 | – | – | – |
| Southeastern | 8 | 9–8 | .529 | 1 | 7 | 6 | 3 | – | – | – | – |
| Ivy League | 1 | 2–1 | .667 | – | 1 | 1 | 1 | – | – | – | – |
| American | 2 | 2–2 | .500 | – | 2 | 1 | 1 | – | – | – | – |
| Big Ten | 8 | 6–8 | .429 | – | 8 | 5 | 1 | – | – | – | – |
| Pac-12 | 4 | 3–4 | .429 | 1 | 4 | 1 | 1 | – | – | – | – |
| Northeast | 1 | 2–1 | .667 | 1 | 1 | 1 | – | – | – | – | – |
| Southern | 1 | 1–1 | .500 | – | 1 | 1 | – | – | – | – | – |
| Southland | 1 | 1–1 | .500 | 1 | 1 | – | – | – | – | – | – |

- The FF, R64, R32, S16, E8, F4, CG, and NC columns indicate how many teams from each conference were in the first four, round of 64 (first round), round of 32 (second round), Sweet 16, Elite Eight, Final Four, championship game, and national champion, respectively.
- The America East, Atlantic Sun, Atlantic 10, Big Sky, Big South, Big West, CAA, Horizon, MAAC, MAC, MEAC, Missouri Valley, Patriot, Summit, Sun Belt, and WAC conferences each had one representative, eliminated in the first round with a record of 0–1.
- The Ohio Valley and SWAC each had one representative, both eliminated in the First Four with a record of 0–1.

== Media coverage ==
=== Television ===
CBS Sports and Warner Bros. Discovery Sports (formerly Turner Sports) had US television rights to the tournament. As part of a cycle that began in 2016, CBS televised the 2023 Final Four and the national championship game.

The 2023 tournament was Jim Nantz's final season as the lead play-by-play announcer, with Ian Eagle succeeding him starting in 2024 onwards.

The 2023 tournament was also Greg Gumbel's last as studio host, as he was unavailable due to family health concerns for the 2024 NCAA tournament before he died from cancer on December 27, 2024.

==== Television channels ====
- Selection Show – CBS
- First Four – TruTV
- First and Second Rounds – CBS, TBS, TNT and TruTV
- Regional semifinals and finals – CBS and TBS
- National semifinals (Final Four) and championship – CBS

==== Studio hosts ====
- Greg Gumbel (New York City and Houston) – First round, second round, regionals, Final Four and national championship game
- Ernie Johnson (Atlanta, New York City, and Houston) – First round, second round, regionals, and Final Four
- Adam Lefkoe (Atlanta) – First Four and first round
- Adam Zucker (New York City) – First round and second round (game breaks)
- Nabil Karim (Atlanta) - First round and second round (game breaks)

==== Studio analysts ====
- Charles Barkley (New York City and Houston) – First round, second round, regionals, Final Four and national championship game
- Seth Davis (Atlanta and Houston) – First Four, first round, second round, regional semifinals and Final Four
- Clark Kellogg (New York City and Houston) – First round, second round, regionals, Final Four and national championship game
- Candace Parker (Atlanta and Houston) – First Four, first round, second round, regional semifinals, and Final Four
- Kenny Smith (New York City and Houston) – First round, second round, regionals, Final Four and national championship game
- Gene Steratore (New York City and Houston) (Rules Analyst) – First Four, first round, second round, regionals, Final Four and national championship game
- Wally Szczerbiak (New York City) – Second round
- Jay Wright (Atlanta, New York City and Houston) – First Four, first round, second round, regionals, Final Four and national championship game

==== Commentary teams ====
- Jim Nantz/Bill Raftery/Grant Hill/Tracy Wolfson – First and Second Rounds at Birmingham, Alabama; Midwest Regional at Kansas City, Missouri; Final Four and National Championship at Houston, Texas
- Brian Anderson/Jim Jackson/Allie LaForce – First and Second Rounds at Des Moines, Iowa; East Regional at New York City, New York
- Ian Eagle/Jim Spanarkel/Evan Washburn – First and Second Rounds at Greensboro, North Carolina; South Regional at Louisville, Kentucky
- Kevin Harlan/Dan Bonner/Stan Van Gundy/Lauren Shehadi – First and Second Rounds at Orlando, Florida; West Regional at Las Vegas, Nevada
- Brad Nessler/Brendan Haywood/Dana Jacobson – First and Second Rounds at Sacramento, California
- Spero Dedes/Debbie Antonelli/AJ Ross – First and Second Rounds at Albany, New York
- Andrew Catalon/Steve Lappas/Jamie Erdahl – First and Second Rounds at Columbus, Ohio
- Lisa Byington/Steve Smith/Avery Johnson/Andy Katz – First and Second Rounds at Denver, Colorado
- Tom McCarthy/Avery Johnson/Jon Rothstein – First Four at Dayton, Ohio

==== Most watched tournament games ====
(#) Tournament seedings and region in parentheses.

| Rank | Round | Date and time (ET) | Matchup | | | Network | Viewers (millions) | TV rating |
|---|---|---|---|---|---|---|---|---|
| 1 | National Championship | April 3, 2023, 9:20 p.m. | (5 S) San Diego State | 59–76 | (4 W) UConn | CBS | 14.69 | 7.75 |
| 2 | Final Four | April 1, 2023, 9:16 p.m. | (5 MW) Miami | 59–72 | (4 W) UConn | CBS | 12.85 | 6.38 |
| 3 | Final Four | April 1, 2023, 6:09 p.m. | (9 E) Florida Atlantic | 71–72 | (5 S) San Diego State | CBS | 11.90 | 6.02 |
| 4 | Elite Eight | March 26, 2023, 5:10 p.m. | (5 MW) Miami | 88–81 | (2 MW) Texas | CBS | 11.30 | 6.08 |
| 5 | Second Round | March 19, 2023, 5:15 p.m. | (7 E) Michigan State | 69–60 | (2 E) Marquette | CBS | 10.91 | 5.86 |
| 6 | Second Round | March 18, 2023, 5:15 p.m. | (8 W) Arkansas | 72–71 | (1 W) Kansas | CBS | 9.50 | 4.93 |
| 7 | Second Round | March 19, 2023, 2:15 p.m. | (6 E) Kentucky | 69–75 | (3 W) Kansas State | CBS | 9.40 | 5.07 |
| 8 | Second Round | March 18, 2023, 2:40 p.m. | (5 E) Duke | 52–65 | (4 E) Tennessee | CBS | 8.92 | 4.81 |
| 9 | Elite Eight | March 26, 2023, 2:20 p.m. | (6 S) Creighton | 56–57 | (5 S) San Diego State | CBS | 8.34 | 4.67 |
| 10 | Elite Eight | March 25, 2023, 8:59 p.m. | (4 W) UConn | 82–54 | (3 W) Gonzaga | TBS | 7.99 | 4.13 |

=== Radio ===
Westwood One will have exclusive coverage of the entire tournament.

==== First Four ====
- Ted Emrich and Jon Crispin – at Dayton, Ohio

==== First and second rounds ====
- John Sadak and Will Perdue – Orlando, Florida
- Brandon Gaudin and Stephen Bardo – Birmingham, Alabama
- Jason Benetti and Robbie Hummel – Des Moines, Iowa
- Ryan Radtke and Dan Dickau – Sacramento, California
- Scott Graham and P. J. Carlesimo – Albany, New York
- Bill Rosinski and Austin Croshere – Greensboro, North Carolina
- Kevin Kugler and Jordan Cornette – Columbus, Ohio
- Dave Pasch and Fran Fraschilla – Denver, Colorado

==== Regionals ====
- Gary Cohen and Jon Crispin – East Regional at New York City, New York
- Ryan Radtke and P. J. Carlesimo – West Regional at Las Vegas, Nevada
- Tom McCarthy and Jordan Cornette – South Regional at Louisville, Kentucky
- Kevin Kugler and Robbie Hummel – Midwest Regional at Kansas City, Missouri

==== Final Four and national championship ====
- Kevin Kugler, Jim Jackson, Clark Kellogg, and Andy Katz – Houston, Texas

=== Internet ===
Video

Live video of games is available for streaming through the following means:

- NCAA March Madness Live (website and app, CBS games are available for free on digital media players; access to games requires TV Everywhere authentication through provider)
- Paramount+ (only CBS games)
- Watch TBS website and app (only TBS games, required TV Everywhere authentication)
- Watch TNT website and app (only TNT games, required TV Everywhere authentication)
- Watch truTV website and app (only truTV games, required TV Everywhere authentication)
- Websites and apps of cable, satellite, and OTT providers of CBS, TBS, TNT, and truTV (access required subscription)

For the app this year, a new multiview which showed all games airing simultaneously was available.

In addition, the March Madness app offered Fast Break, whiparound coverage of games similar to NFL RedZone on the First weekend of the tournament (First and Second rounds).

- Dave Briggs, Tony Delk, Tyler Hansbrough, Randolph Childress – Atlanta

Audio

Live audio of games is available for streaming through the following means:

- NCAA March Madness Live (website and app)
- Westwood One Sports website
- TuneIn (website and app, required TuneIn Premium subscription)
- Varsity Network app
- Websites and apps of Westwood One Sports affiliates

New in 2023, the March Madness app supported Apple CarPlay and Android Auto through a native app.

== See also ==
- 2023 NCAA Division I women's basketball tournament
- 2023 NCAA Division II men's basketball tournament
- 2023 NCAA Division III men's basketball tournament
- 2023 National Invitation Tournament
