= 2020–21 Seton Hall Pirates men's basketball team =

American college basketball season

2020–21 Seton Hall Pirates men's basketball
- Conference: Big East Conference
- Record: 14–13 (10–9 Big East)
- Head coach: Kevin Willard (11th season)
- Assistant coaches: Grant Billmeier; Tony Skinn; Duane Woodward
- Home arena: Prudential Center; Walsh Gymnasium

2020–21 Big East men's basketball standings
	Conf.				Overall
Team	W		L	PCT	W		L	PCT
No. 18 Villanova	11	–	4	.733	18	–	7	.720
No. 19 Creighton	14	–	6	.700	22	–	9	.710
UConn	11	–	6	.647	15	–	8	.652
St. John's	10	–	9	.526	16	–	11	.593
Seton Hall	10	–	9	.526	14	–	13	.519
Providence	9	–	10	.474	13	–	13	.500
Xavier	6	–	7	.462	13	–	8	.619
Georgetown †	7	–	9	.438	13	–	13	.500
Marquette	8	–	11	.421	13	–	14	.481
Butler	8	–	12	.400	10	–	15	.400
DePaul	2	–	13	.133	5	–	14	.263
† 2021 Big East tournament winner Rankings from AP poll

The 2020–21 Seton Hall Pirates men's basketball team represented Seton Hall University in the 2020–21 NCAA Division I men's basketball season. They were led by eleventh-year head coach Kevin Willard. The Pirates played their home games at the Prudential Center in Newark, New Jersey and Walsh Gymnasium in South Orange, New Jersey as members of the Big East Conference. In a season limited due to the ongoing COVID-19 pandemic, they finished the season 14–13, 10–9 in Big East play to finish in a tie for fourth place. As the No. 5 seed in the Big East tournament, they defeated St. John's in the quarterfinals before losing to Georgetown in the semifinals.

== Previous season ==
The Pirates finished the 2019–20 season 21–9, 13–5 in Big East play to finish in a three-way tie for first place; the program's first regular season title since 1992–93. However, the season ended due to the ongoing COVID-19 pandemic prior to playing a game in the Big East tournament, which was canceled during the first quarterfinal round game, following a campaign in which the Pirates were projected to receive an at-large bid to the also-canceled 2020 NCAA tournament regardless of how they fared in the Big East tournament.

== Offseason ==
=== Departures ===
Name	Number	Pos.	Height	Weight	Year	Hometown	Reason for departure
Quincy McKnight	0	G	6'4"	185	Senior	Bridgeport, Connecticut	Graduated
Anthony Nelson	2	G	6'4"	180	Sophomore	New York City, New York	Transferred to Manhattan
Myles Powell	13	G	6'2"	195	Senior	Trenton, New Jersey	Graduated
Taurean Thompson	15	F	6'11"	235	Senior	New York City, New York	Transferred to Detroit Mercy
Asiah Avent	30	G	6'3"	190	Senior	Springfield, New Jersey	Graduated
Darnell Brodie	32	F	6'9"	265	Sophomore	Newark, New Jersey	Transferred to Drake
Romaro Gill	35	C	7'2"	255	Senior	St. Thomas, Jamaica	Graduated

=== Incoming transfers ===
Name	Number	Pos.	Height	Weight	Year	Hometown	Previous School
Bryce Aiken	1	G	6'0"	180	Graduate Student	Randolph, New Jersey	Graduate transfer from Harvard. Will have one year of remaining eligibility.
Tray Jackson	2	F	6'9"	205	Sophomore	Detroit, Michigan	Transferred from Missouri. Under NCAA transfer rules, Jackson was initially to sit out 2020–21 season, however due to the effects of the COVID-19 pandemic the NCAA ruled on December 16, 2020, that all transfers are immediately eligible. Will have three years of remaining eligibility.

=== 2020 recruiting class ===
College recruiting
Name	Hometown	School	Height	Weight	Commit date
Jahari Long; PG	Houston, TX	Episcopal HS	6 ft 5 in (1.96 m)	210 lb (95 kg)	Jul 20, 2019
Jahari Long; PG	Recruit ratings: 247Sports:				
Dimingus Stevens; SG	Washington, DC	Bishop Walsh School	6 ft 6 in (1.98 m)	180 lb (82 kg)	Jan 6, 2019
Dimingus Stevens; SG	Recruit ratings: 247Sports:				
Overall recruit ranking:
Note: In many cases, Scout, Rivals, 247Sports, On3, and ESPN may conflict in their listings of height and weight.; In these cases, the average was taken. ESPN grades are on a 100-point scale.; Sources: "2020 Team Ranking". Rivals.

== Roster ==
2020–21 Seton Hall Pirates men's basketball team
Players
Coaches

Pos.	#	Name	Height	Weight	Year	Previous school	Hometown
G/F	0	Dimingus Stevens	6 ft 6 in (1.98 m)	180 lb (82 kg)	Fr	Bishop Walsh School	Washington, D.C.
G	1	Bryce Aiken	6 ft 0 in (1.83 m)	180 lb (82 kg)	GS	Harvard	Randolph, New Jersey
F	2	Tray Jackson	6 ft 9 in (2.06 m)	205 lb (93 kg)	So	Missouri	Detroit, Michigan
F	4	Tyrese Samuel	6 ft 10 in (2.08 m)	235 lb (107 kg)	So	Orangeville Prep	Montreal, Quebec
G/F	14	Jared Rhoden	6 ft 6 in (1.98 m)	210 lb (95 kg)	Jr	Our Saviour Lutheran School	Baldwin, New York
G	15	Takal Molson	6 ft 5 in (1.96 m)	205 lb (93 kg)	RS Jr	Canisius	Buffalo, New York
C	21	Ike Obiagu	7 ft 2 in (2.18 m)	270 lb (122 kg)	RS Jr	Florida State	Abuja, Nigeria
G/F	22	Myles Cale	6 ft 6 in (1.98 m)	210 lb (95 kg)	Sr	Appoquinimink High School	Middletown, Delaware
F	23	Sandro Mamukelashvili	6 ft 11 in (2.11 m)	240 lb (109 kg)	Sr	Montverde Academy	Tbilisi, Georgia
G	25	Jahari Long	6 ft 5 in (1.96 m)	210 lb (95 kg)	Fr	Episcopal High School	Houston, Texas
G	30	Sylwester Granda (W)	6 ft 4 in (1.93 m)	195 lb (88 kg)	Fr	High School for Environmental Studies	Brooklyn, New York
C	32	Jeff Ngandu	6 ft 9 in (2.06 m)	220 lb (100 kg)	Fr	Orangeville Prep	DR Congo
G	33	Shavar Reynolds Jr.	6 ft 2 in (1.88 m)	185 lb (84 kg)	Sr	Manchester Township High School	Manchester, New Jersey

Head coach

- Kevin Willard (Pittsburgh)

Assistant coach(es)

- Grant Billmeier (Seton Hall)
- Tony Skinn (George Mason)
- Duane Woodward (Boston College)

Legend

- (C) Team captain
- (S) Suspended
- (I) Ineligible
- (W) Walk-on
- Injured
- Current redshirt

Roster
Last update: December 12, 2020

== Schedule and results ==
Date time, TV	Rank^{#}	Opponent^{#}	Result	Record	High points	High rebounds	High assists	Site (attendance) city, state
Non-conference regular season
November 27, 2020*; 4:00 pm, ESPN2		at Louisville	L 70–71	0–1	22 – Mamukelashvili	10 – Mamukelashvili	3 – Tied	KFC Yum! Center; Louisville, KY
November 30, 2020*; 9:00 pm, FS1		Iona	W 86–68	1–1	26 – Rhoden	10 – Rhoden	3 – 3 Tied	Prudential Center; Newark, NJ
December 2, 2020*; 7:00 pm, CBSSN		at Rhode Island	L 70–83	1–2	25 – Mamukelashvili	10 – Mamukelashvili	3 – Reynolds	Ryan Center; Kingston, RI
December 4, 2020*; 9:00 pm, FS1		vs. No. 21 Oregon	L 70–83	1–3	17 – Reynolds	6 – Mamukelashvili	8 – Reynolds	CHI Health Center Omaha; Omaha, NE
December 6, 2020*; 8:00 pm, BTN		at Penn State	W 98–92 ^{OT}	2–3	30 – Mamukelashvili	8 – Rhoden	7 – Reynolds	Bryce Jordan Center; State College, PA
December 8, 2020*; 5:00 pm, FS1		Wagner	W 78–45	3–3	22 – Rhoden	11 – Rhoden	5 – Reynolds	Prudential Center; Newark, NJ
Big East regular season
December 11, 2020; 4:30 pm, CBSSN		St. John's	W 77–68	4–3 (1–0)	32 – Mamukelashvili	9 – Tied	5 – Reynolds	Prudential Center; Newark, NJ
December 15, 2020; 8:00 pm, FS1		Xavier	Postponed due to COVID-19; rescheduled for January 16					Cintas Center; Cincinnati, OH
December 17, 2020; 9:00 pm, FS1		at Marquette	W 70–63	5–3 (2–0)	17 – Mamukelashvili	8 – Rhoden	7 – Mamukelashvili	Fiserv Forum; Milwaukee, WI
December 20, 2020; 4:30 pm, FS1		Providence	L 77–80 ^{OT}	5–4 (2–1)	20 – Mamukelashvili	9 – Obiagu	6 – Mamukelashvili	Prudential Center; Newark, NJ
December 23, 2020; 5:00 pm, FS1		Georgetown	W 78–67	6–4 (3–1)	30 – Cale	12 – Rhoden	6 – Aiken	Prudential Center; Newark, NJ
December 30, 2020; 7:00 pm, FS1		at Xavier	W 85–68	7–4 (4–1)	18 – Mamukelashvili	8 – Rhoden	6 – Reynolds	Cintas Center; Cincinnati, OH
January 2, 2021; 4:30 pm, FS1		Butler	W 68–60	8–4 (5–1)	24 – Mamukelashvili	9 – Mamukelashvili	6 – Mamukelashvili	Prudential Center; Newark, NJ
January 6, 2021; 9:00 pm, FS1		at No. 7 Creighton	L 53–89	8–5 (5–2)	14 – Mamukelashvili	5 – Mamukelashvili	2 – Tied	CHI Health Center Omaha (1,689); Omaha, NE
January 9, 2021; 2:00 pm, FS1		at DePaul	W 76–68	9–5 (6–2)	18 – Rhoden	8 – Mamukelashvili	4 – Reynolds	Wintrust Arena; Chicago, IL
January 16, 2021; 3:00 pm, CBSSN		Xavier	Canceled due to COVID-19					Prudential Center; Newark, NJ
January 19, 2021; 9:00 pm, FS1		at No. 3 Villanova	L 74–76	9–6 (6–3)	23 – Mamukelashvili	9 – Mamukelashvili	5 – Mamukelashvili	Finneran Pavilion; Villanova, PA
January 22, 2021; 9:00 pm, FS1		at Butler	Postponed due to COVID-19; rescheduled for February 24					Hinkle Fieldhouse; Indianapolis, IN
January 27, 2021; 9:00 pm, FS1		No. 17 Creighton	L 81–85	9–7 (6–4)	27 – Aiken	9 – Cale	6 – Reynolds	Prudential Center; Newark, NJ
January 30, 2021; 3:00 pm, FOX		No. 3 Villanova	L 72–80	9–8 (6–5)	13 – Reynolds	9 – Mamukelashvili	3 – 3 Tied	Prudential Center; Newark, NJ
February 3, 2021; 7:00 pm, FS1		at Providence	W 60–43	10–8 (7–5)	20 – Mamukelashvili	7 – Tied	4 – Reynolds	Alumni Hall; Providence, RI
February 6, 2021; 12:00 pm, FOX		at UConn	W 80–73	11–8 (8–5)	22 – Mamukelashvili	7 – Mamukelashvili	3 – Tied	Harry A. Gampel Pavilion; Storrs, CT
February 14, 2021; 3:00 pm, FS1		Marquette	W 57–51	12–8 (9–5)	20 – Rhoden	9 – Mamukelashvili	4 – Rhoden	Prudential Center; Newark, NJ
February 17, 2021; 8:30 pm, FS1		DePaul	W 60–52	13–8 (10–5)	25 – Mamukelashvili	11 – Mamukelashvili	5 – Reynolds	Prudential Center; Newark, NJ
February 20, 2021; 5:30 pm, CBSSN		at Georgetown	L 75–81	13–9 (10–6)	22 – Mamukelashvili	9 – Rhoden	4 – Tied	Capital One Arena; Washington, D.C.
February 24, 2021; 7:00 pm, CBSSN		at Butler	L 52–61	13–10 (10–7)	14 – Rhoden	6 – Samuel	6 – Reynolds	Hinkle Fieldhouse (1,524); Indianapolis, IN
March 3, 2021; 6:30 pm, FS1		UConn	L 58–69	13–11 (10–8)	20 – Mamukelashvili	10 – Mamukelashvili	4 – Reynolds	Prudential Center; Newark, NJ
March 6, 2021; 7:00 pm, FS1		at St. John's	L 71–81	13–12 (10–9)	15 – Mamukelashvili	10 – Mamukelashvili	4 – Mamukelashvili	Carnesecca Arena; Queens, NY
Big East tournament
March 11, 2021; 3:00 pm, FS1	(5)	vs. (4) St. John's; Quarterfinals	W 77–69 ^{OT}	14–12	20 – Mamukelashvili	16 – Rhoden	4 – Mamukelashvili	Madison Square Garden; Manhattan, NY
March 12, 2021; 6:00 pm, FS1	(5)	vs. (8) Georgetown; Semifinals	L 58–66	14–13	22 – Rhoden	10 – Mamukelashvili	5 – Mamukelashvili	Madison Square Garden; Manhattan, NY
*Non-conference game. ^{#}Rankings from AP Poll. (#) Tournament seedings in parentheses. All times are in Eastern Time.

== Rankings ==
Ranking movements Legend: ██ Increase in ranking ██ Decrease in ranking — = Not ranked RV = Received votes
	Week																				
Poll	Pre	1	2	3	4	5	6	7	8	9	10	11	12	13	14	15	16	17	18	19	Final
AP	RV	—	—	—	—	—	RV	—	—	—	—	—	—	—	—	—	—	—	—	—	—
Coaches	RV	—	—	—	—	—	RV	RV	—	—	—	—	—	—	—	—	—	—	—	—	—
