= 2020–21 Marquette Golden Eagles men's basketball team =

American college basketball season

2020–21 Marquette Golden Eagles men's basketball
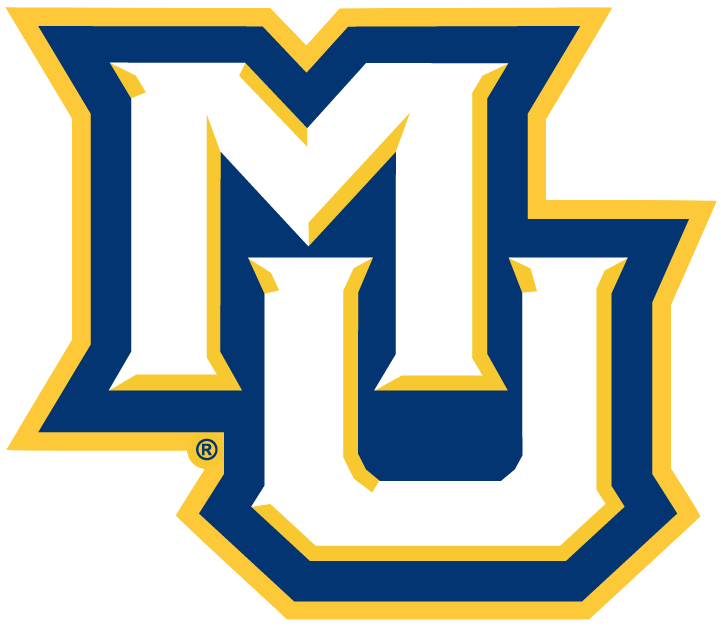
- Conference: Big East Conference
- Record: 13–14 (8–11 Big East)
- Head coach: Steve Wojciechowski (7th season)
- Associate head coach: Dwayne Killings (3rd season)
- Assistant coaches: Justin Gainey (1st season); Jake Presutti (2nd season)
- Home arena: Fiserv Forum

2020–21 Big East men's basketball standings
	Conf.				Overall
Team	W		L	PCT	W		L	PCT
No. 18 Villanova	11	–	4	.733	18	–	7	.720
No. 19 Creighton	14	–	6	.700	22	–	9	.710
UConn	11	–	6	.647	15	–	8	.652
St. John's	10	–	9	.526	16	–	11	.593
Seton Hall	10	–	9	.526	14	–	13	.519
Providence	9	–	10	.474	13	–	13	.500
Xavier	6	–	7	.462	13	–	8	.619
Georgetown †	7	–	9	.438	13	–	13	.500
Marquette	8	–	11	.421	13	–	14	.481
Butler	8	–	12	.400	10	–	15	.400
DePaul	2	–	13	.133	5	–	14	.263
† 2021 Big East tournament winner Rankings from AP poll

The 2020–21 Marquette Golden Eagles men's basketball team represented Marquette University during the 2020–21 NCAA Division I men's basketball season. The team was led by seventh-year head coach Steve Wojciechowski, and played their home games at Fiserv Forum in Milwaukee, Wisconsin as a member of the Big East Conference. They finished the season 13–14, 8–11 in Big East play to finish in ninth place. They lost in the first round of the Big East tournament to Georgetown.

On March 19, 2021, the school fired head coach Steve Wojciechowski. A week later, the school named Texas head coach Shaka Smart the team's new head coach.

== Previous season ==
The Golden Eagles finished the 2019–20 season 18–12, 8–10 in Big East play to finish in a tie for sixth place. The Big East tournament and all other postseason tournaments were canceled due to the ongoing COVID-19 pandemic.

== Roster ==
2020–21 Marquette Golden Eagles men's basketball team
Players
Coaches

Pos.	#	Name	Height	Weight	Year	Previous school	Hometown
F	2	Justin Lewis	6 ft 7 in (2.01 m)	245 lb (111 kg)	Fr	Baltimore Poly	Baltimore, MD
F	4	Theo John	6 ft 9 in (2.06 m)	245 lb (111 kg)	Sr	Champlin Park HS	Minneapolis, MN
G	5	Greg Elliott	6 ft 3 in (1.91 m)	180 lb (82 kg)	RS Jr	East English Village Prep	Detroit, MI
G	10	Symir Torrence	6 ft 3 in (1.91 m)	—	So	Vermont Academy	Syracuse, NY
G	12	Dexter Akanno	6 ft 4 in (1.93 m)	205 lb (93 kg)	RS Fr	Blair Academy	Valencia, CA
F	13	Oso Ighodaro	6 ft 9 in (2.06 m)	205 lb (93 kg)	Fr	Desert Vista HS	Chandler, AZ
G	21	D. J. Carton	6 ft 2 in (1.88 m)	200 lb (91 kg)	So	Ohio State	Bettendorf, IA
F	23	Jamal Cain	6 ft 7 in (2.01 m)	200 lb (91 kg)	Sr	Cornerstone Health & Technology HS	Pontiac, MI
G	25	Koby McEwen	6 ft 4 in (1.93 m)	195 lb (88 kg)	RS Sr	Wasatch Academy	Toronto, Canada
F	33	Dawson Garcia	6 ft 11 in (2.11 m)	235 lb (107 kg)	Fr	Prior Lake HS	Prior Lake, MN
F	40	Tommy Gardiner (W)	6 ft 7 in (2.01 m)	230 lb (104 kg)	Jr	Maine South HS	Park Ridge, IL
G	41	Brendan Carney (W)	6 ft 2 in (1.88 m)	190 lb (86 kg)	So	Sacred Heart Prep	Menlo Park, CA
F	42	Michael Kennedy (W)	6 ft 6 in (1.98 m)	190 lb (86 kg)	So	Homestead HS	Mequon, WI
G	50	Luke Fizulich	6 ft 2 in (1.88 m)	185 lb (84 kg)	Fr	Archbishop Stepinac HS	Harrington Park, NJ
G	55	Jose Perez	6 ft 5 in (1.96 m)	220 lb (100 kg)	Jr	Gardner–Webb	Bronx, NY
F		Ike Eke	6 ft 9 in (2.06 m)	220 lb (100 kg)	RS Jr	University of Detroit Jesuit HS	Lagos, Nigeria

Head coach

- Steve Wojciechowski (Duke)

Assistant coach(es)

- Dwayne Killings (Hampton)
- Justin Gainey (NC State)
- Jake Presutti (Syracuse)

Legend

- (C) Team captain
- (S) Suspended
- (I) Ineligible
- (W) Walk-on
- Injured
- Current redshirt

Roster
Last update: March 29, 2021

== Schedule and results ==
Date time, TV	Rank^{#}	Opponent^{#}	Result	Record	High points	High rebounds	High assists	Site (attendance) city, state
Regular season
November 25, 2020*; 9:00 p.m., FS1		Arkansas–Pine Bluff	W 99–57	1–0	19 – Garcia	12 – John	5 – Carton	Fiserv Forum; Milwaukee, WI
November 27, 2020*; 6:30 p.m., FS1		Eastern Illinois	W 75–50	2–0	16 – Garcia	9 – John	6 – Torrence	Fiserv Forum; Milwaukee, WI
December 1, 2020*; 6:00 p.m., FS1		Oklahoma State; Big East-Big 12 Battle	L 62–70	2–1	21 – McEwen	13 – Tied	4 – McEwen	Fiserv Forum; Milwaukee, WI
December 4, 2020*; 6:00 p.m., FS1		No. 4 Wisconsin	W 67–65	3–1	18 – Lewis	8 – Tied	4 – Carton	Fiserv Forum; Milwaukee, WI
December 8, 2020*; 8:00 p.m., FS1		Green Bay	W 82–68	4–1	28 – McEwen	12 – John	4 – McEwen	Fiserv Forum; Milwaukee, WI
December 11, 2020*; 8:30 p.m., P12N		at UCLA	L 60–69	4–2	18 – Carton	7 – Cain	4 – Carton	Pauley Pavilion (0); Los Angeles, CA
December 14, 2020; 8:00 p.m., FS1		at No. 9 Creighton	W 89–84	5–2 (1–0)	20 – Carton	10 – Garcia	5 – Carton	CHI Health Center Omaha (255); Omaha, NE
December 17, 2020; 8:00 p.m., FS1		Seton Hall	L 63–70	5–3 (1–1)	16 – Carton	12 – Garcia	3 – Carton	Fiserv Forum; Milwaukee, WI
December 20, 2020; 1:00 p.m., FS1		at Xavier	L 88–91	5–4 (1–2)	20 – Tied	7 – Cain	5 – Carton	Cintas Center (300); Cincinnati, OH
December 23, 2020; 6:00 p.m., FS1		No. 5 Villanova	L 68–85	5–5 (1–3)	15 – Cain	8 – Garcia	5 – Carton	Fiserv Forum; Milwaukee, WI
January 2, 2021; 7:30 p.m., CBSSN		at Georgetown	W 64–60	6–5 (2–3)	25 – Cain	13 – Garcia	4 – Carton	McDonough Gymnasium; Washington, D.C.
January 5, 2021; 9:00 p.m., FS1		Connecticut	L 54–65	6–6 (2–4)	20 – Garcia	11 – Garcia	5 – Tied	Fiserv Forum; Milwaukee, WI
January 8, 2021; 9:00 p.m., FS1		at Villanova	Postponed due to the COVID-19 pandemic; rescheduled for February 10					Finneran Pavilion; Villanova, PA
January 12, 2021; 9:00 p.m., FS1		Providence	W 79–69	7–6 (3–4)	20 – Garcia	8 – McEwen	5 – McEwen	Fiserv Forum; Milwaukee, WI
January 16, 2021; 2:00 p.m., FS1		at St. John's	W 73–71	8–6 (4–4)	14 – Carton	7 – Tied	3 – Torrence	Carnesecca Arena; Queens, NY
January 20, 2021; 7:00 p.m., FS1		Georgetown	Canceled due to the COVID-19 pandemic					Fiserv Forum; Milwaukee, WI
January 23, 2021; 6:00 p.m., FS1		DePaul	L 61–68	8–7 (4–5)	23 – Carton	8 – Tied	3 – Tied	Fiserv Forum; Milwaukee, WI
January 27, 2021; 7:00 p.m., CBSSN		at Providence	L 63–72	8–8 (4–6)	13 – McEwen	8 – Lewis	6 – Carton	Alumni Hall; Providence, RI
January 31, 2021; 3:30 p.m., FOX		St. John's	L 73–75	8–9 (4–7)	20 – Garcia	9 – Garcia	4 – Tied	Fiserv Forum; Milwaukee, WI
February 2, 2021; 5:00 p.m., FS1		Butler	W 70–67	9–9 (5–7)	18 – Tied	9 – Carton	3 – Tied	Fiserv Forum; Milwaukee, WI
February 6, 2021; 5:00 p.m., FS1		No. 15 Creighton	L 68–71	9–10 (5–8)	16 – Carton	7 – Cain	3 – 3 Tied	Fiserv Forum; Milwaukee, WI
February 10, 2021; 9:00 p.m., FS1		at No. 5 Villanova	L 64–96	9–11 (5–9)	28 – Garcia	7 – Carton	4 – Carton	Finneran Pavilion; Villanova, PA
February 14, 2021; 3:00 pm, FS1		at Seton Hall	L 51–57	9–12 (5–10)	16 – Carton	9 – McEwen	2 – McEwen	Prudential Center; Newark, NJ
February 17, 2021; 6:20 pm, FS1		at Butler	W 73–57	10–12 (6–10)	17 – Elliot	14 – Cain	2 – 3 Tied	Hinkle Fieldhouse (1,389); Indianapolis, IN
February 24, 2021*; 6:00 pm, ESPN2		at North Carolina	W 83–70	11–12	24 – Garcia	11 – Garcia	6 – McEwen	Dean Smith Center; Chapel Hill, NC
February 27, 2021; 2:30 pm, FOX		at Connecticut	L 62–80	11–13 (6–11)	18 – Garcia	8 – Garcia	3 – Tied	Gampel Pavilion; Storrs, CT
March 2, 2021; 9:00 pm, FS1		at DePaul	W 77–71	12–13 (7–11)	20 – Carton	9 – Cain	4 – McEwen	Wintrust Arena; Chicago, IL
March 6, 2021; 8:00 p.m., FS1		Xavier	W 66–59	13–13 (8–11)	16 – Carton	7 – 3 Tied	4 – Tied	Fiserv Forum; Milwaukee, WI
Big East tournament
March 10, 2021; 2:00 p.m., FS1	(9)	vs. (8) Georgetown; First Round	L 49–68	13–14	17 – Carton	7 – Lewis	6 – Carton	Madison Square Garden; Manhattan, NY
*Non-conference game. ^{#}Rankings from AP Poll. (#) Tournament seedings in parentheses. All times are in Central Time.
