= 2020–21 DePaul Blue Demons men's basketball team =

American college basketball season

2020–21 DePaul Blue Demons men's basketball
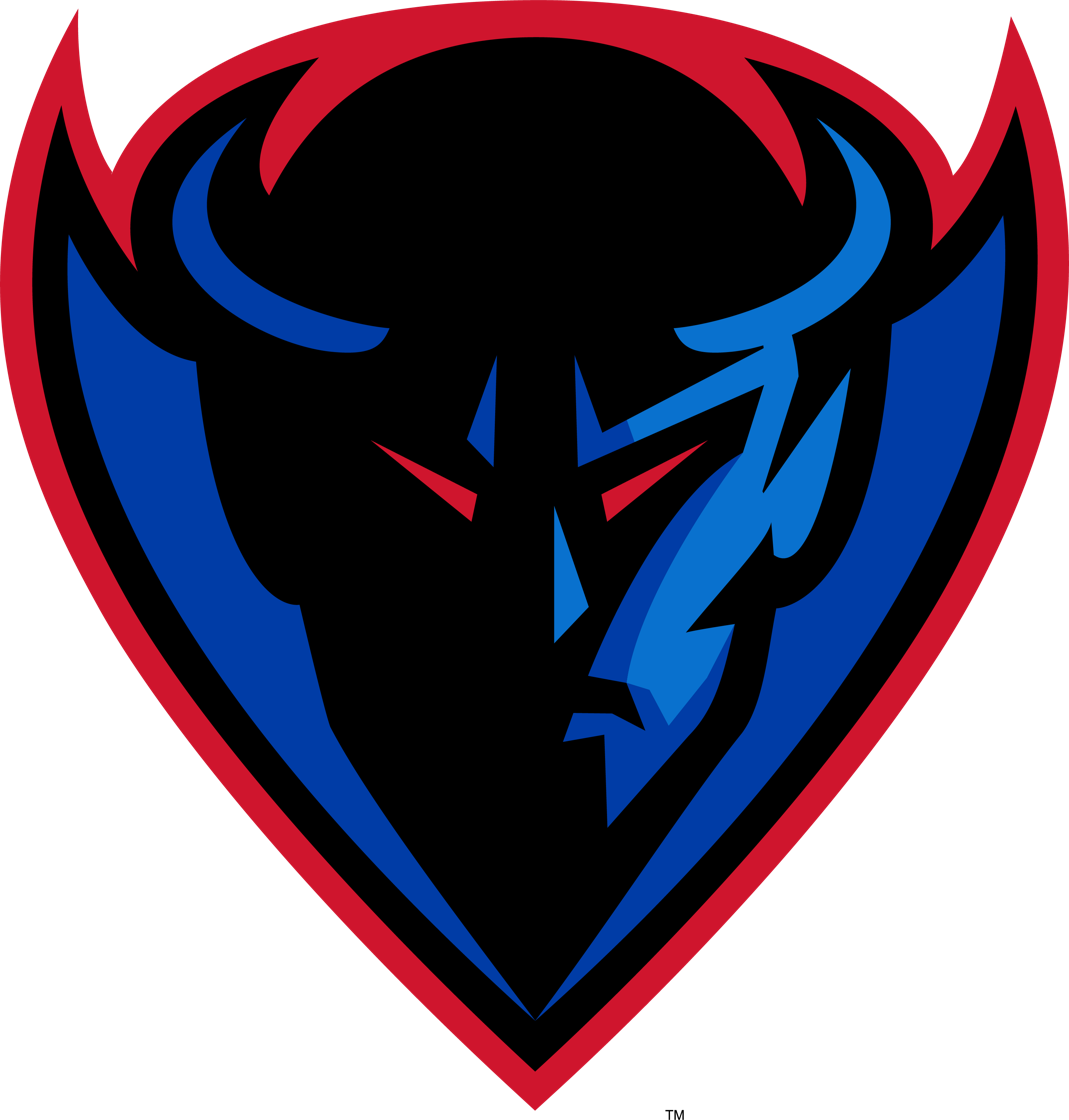
- Conference: Big East Conference
- Record: 5–14 (2–13 Big East)
- Head coach: Dave Leitao (6th straight, 9th overall season)
- Assistant coaches: Tim Anderson (4th season); Shane Heirman (4th season); Marc Hsu (2nd season)
- Home arena: Wintrust Arena

2020–21 Big East men's basketball standings
	Conf.				Overall
Team	W		L	PCT	W		L	PCT
No. 18 Villanova	11	–	4	.733	18	–	7	.720
No. 19 Creighton	14	–	6	.700	22	–	9	.710
UConn	11	–	6	.647	15	–	8	.652
St. John's	10	–	9	.526	16	–	11	.593
Seton Hall	10	–	9	.526	14	–	13	.519
Providence	9	–	10	.474	13	–	13	.500
Xavier	6	–	7	.462	13	–	8	.619
Georgetown †	7	–	9	.438	13	–	13	.500
Marquette	8	–	11	.421	13	–	14	.481
Butler	8	–	12	.400	10	–	15	.400
DePaul	2	–	13	.133	5	–	14	.263
† 2021 Big East tournament winner Rankings from AP poll

The 2020–21 DePaul Blue Demons men's basketball team represented DePaul University during the 2020–21 NCAA Division I men's basketball season. They were led by sixth-year (ninth overall with DePaul) head coach Dave Leitao and played their home games at Wintrust Arena in Chicago, Illinois as members of the Big East Conference. In a season limited due to the ongoing COVID-19 pandemic, the Demons finished the season 5–14, 2–13 in Big East play to finish in last place. They defeated Providence in the first round of the Big East tournament before losing to UConn in the quarterfinals.

After finishing in last place in the Big East for a fifth consecutive year, the school fired head coach Leitao on March 15, 2021. On April 1, the school named longtime Oregon assistant Tony Stubblefield the team's new head coach.

== Previous season ==
The Blue Demons finished the 2019–20 season 16–16, 3–15 in Big East play to finish in last place. They defeated Xavier in the first round of the Big East tournament before the remaining tournament was canceled due to the COVID-19 pandemic.

== Offseason ==
=== Departures ===
DePaul Departures
Name	Number	Pos.	Height	Weight	Year	Hometown	Notes
Flynn Cameron	21	G	6'3"	198	Junior	Auckland, New Zealand	Transferred to UC Riverside
Jalen Coleman-Lands	5	G	6'4"	185	Senior	Indianapolis, IN	Transferred to Iowa State
Devin Gage	3	G	6'2"	205	Junior	Chicago, IL	Transferred to Fresno State
Paul Reed	4	F	6'9"	220	Junior	Orlando, FL	Declared for 2020 NBA draft; selected 58th overall by the Philadelphia 76ers
Lyrik Shreiner	10	G	6'3"	195	Senior	Phoenix, AZ	Graduated
D. J. Williams	32	F	6'7"	215	Senior	Chicago, IL	Graduated

=== Incoming transfers ===
Name	Number	Pos.	Height	Weight	Year	Hometown	Previous School
Javon Freeman-Liberty	4	G	6'4	180	Junior	Chicago, IL	Valparaiso
Courvoisier McCauley	23	G	6'5	180	Junior	Indianapolis, IN	Lincoln Memorial
Pauly Paulicap	33	F	6'8	225	Senior	Elmont, NY	Manhattan
Ray Salnave	10	G	6'3	205	Senior	Elmont, NY	Monmouth

=== 2020 recruiting class ===
College recruiting
Name	Hometown	School	Height	Weight	Commit date
Kobe Elvis; PG	Brampton, ON	Bill Crothers Secondary School	6 ft 2 in (1.88 m)	180 lb (82 kg)	Nov 24, 2019
Kobe Elvis; PG	Recruit ratings: 247Sports: (NR)				
Keon Edwards; SF	Pasadena, TX	Hillcrest Prep	6 ft 7 in (2.01 m)	185 lb (84 kg)	Jan 27, 2020
Keon Edwards; SF	Recruit ratings: Rivals: 247Sports: (4)				
Overall recruit ranking:
Note: In many cases, Scout, Rivals, 247Sports, On3, and ESPN may conflict in their listings of height and weight.; In these cases, the average was taken. ESPN grades are on a 100-point scale.; Sources: "2020 DePaul Signees". Rivals.; "2020 DePaul Signees". ESPN.; "2020 Team Ranking". Rivals.

== Roster ==
2020–21 DePaul Blue Demons men's basketball team
Players
Coaches

Pos.	#	Name	Height	Weight	Year	Previous school	Hometown
G	0	Markese Jacobs	5 ft 11 in (1.8 m)	185 lb (84 kg)	So	Uplift Community	Chicago, IL
F	1	Romeo Weems	6 ft 7 in (2.01 m)	215 lb (98 kg)	So	New Haven	Detroit, MI
G	3	Kobe Elvis	6 ft 2 in (1.88 m)	170 lb (77 kg)	Fr	Bill Crothers Secondary School	Brampton, ON
G	4	Javon Freeman-Liberty	6 ft 4 in (1.93 m)	180 lb (82 kg)	Jr	Whitney Young (Valparaiso)	Chicago, IL
F	5	Keon Edwards	6 ft 7 in (2.01 m)	185 lb (84 kg)	Fr	Hillcrest Prep (AZ)	Pasadena, TX
G	10	Ray Salnave	6 ft 3 in (1.91 m)	205 lb (93 kg)	Sr	Benjamin Cardozo (Monmouth)	Elmont, NY
G	11	Charlie Moore	5 ft 11 in (1.8 m)	180 lb (82 kg)	RS Sr	Morgan Park (Kansas/California)	Chicago, IL
G	12	Jason Malonga (W)	6 ft 4 in (1.93 m)	195 lb (88 kg)	Sr	Benet Academy	Bolingbrook, IL
F	13	Darious Hall	6 ft 7 in (2.01 m)	205 lb (93 kg)	RS Jr	Mills University Studies (Arkansas)	Little Rock, AR
C	14	Nick Ongenda	6 ft 11 in (2.11 m)	210 lb (95 kg)	So	Southwest Christian Academy (AR)	Mississauga, Ontario
G	15	Oscar Lopez Jr.	6 ft 4 in (1.93 m)	200 lb (91 kg)	So	Hillcrest Prep Academy (AZ)	Cypress, CA
G	20	Brendan Favre (W)	6 ft 5 in (1.96 m)	170 lb (77 kg)	Jr	IMG Academy (FL)	Vevey, Switzerland
G	23	Courvoisier McCauley	6 ft 5 in (1.96 m)	211 lb (96 kg)	RS Jr	Emmerich Manual (Lincoln Memorial)	Indianapolis, IN
G	30	Max Williams (W)	6 ft 2 in (1.88 m)	190 lb (86 kg)	Fr	IMG Academy (FL)	Chicago, IL
F	32	David Jones	6 ft 6 in (1.98 m)	195 lb (88 kg)	Fr	Teays Valley Christian (WV)	Santo Domingo, DR
F	33	Pauly Paulicap	6 ft 8 in (2.03 m)	225 lb (102 kg)	Sr	Elmont Memorial (Manhattan)	Elmont, NY
G	35	Pantelis Xidias (W)	5 ft 10 in (1.78 m)	165 lb (75 kg)	Sr	La Lumiere	Michigan City, IN

Head coach

- Dave Leitao (Northeastern)

Assistant coach(es)

- Tim Anderson (Oklahoma Panhandle State)
- Shane Heirman (Tulsa)
- Marc Hsu (Cabrini)

Legend

- (C) Team captain
- (S) Suspended
- (I) Ineligible
- (W) Walk-on
- Injured
- Current redshirt

Roster
Last update: 2020-11-26

== Schedule and results ==
Due to the ongoing coronavirus pandemic, the start of the season was pushed back from the scheduled start of November 10. On September 16, 2020, the NCAA announced that November 25 would be the new start date. On November 19, the school announced that it was pausing all men's basketball activities due to positive COVID-19 test results and canceled the first three games of the season. On January 2, 2021, the game against St. John's was postponed due to COVID-19 issues at St. John's. On January 4, the January 5 game against Villanova was postponed due to COVID-19 issues at Villanova.

Date time, TV	Rank^{#}	Opponent^{#}	Result	Record	High points	High rebounds	High assists	Site (attendance) city, state
Regular season
November 25, 2020*; 8:00 pm, FS2		Western Illinois	Postponed due to COVID-19 issues. Rescheduled to December 23rd.					Wintrust Arena; Chicago, IL
November 28, 2020*; 12:00 pm, FS2		Chicago State	Canceled due to COVID-19 issues					Wintrust Arena; Chicago, IL
December 1, 2020*; 8:00 pm, FS2		Alcorn State	Canceled due to COVID-19 issues					Wintrust Arena; Chicago, IL
December 3, 2020*; 8:00 pm, FS1		Northern Illinois	Canceled due to COVID-19 issues					Wintrust Arena; Chicago, IL
December 6, 2020*; 5:00 pm, ESPNU		at Iowa State; Big East/Big 12 Battle	Canceled due to COVID-19 issues					Hilton Coliseum; Ames, IA
December 11, 2020; 3:30 pm, CBSSN		at Seton Hall	Postponed due to COVID-19 issues. Rescheduled to February 17th.					Prudential Center; Newark, NJ
December 14, 2020; 6:00 pm, FS1		at Villanova	Postponed due to COVID-19 issues. Rescheduled to February 9th.					Finneran Pavilion; Villanova, PA
December 17, 2020; 6:00 pm, FS1		at Providence	Postponed due to COVID-19 issues. Rescheduled to December 27th.					Alumni Hall; Providence, RI
December 18, 2020; 1:00 pm, FS1		Xavier	Postponed due to COVID-19 issues. Rescheduled to February 3, 2021.					Wintrust Arena; Chicago, IL
December 21, 2020; 4:30 pm, FS1		at Butler	Postponed due to COVID-19 issues. Rescheduled to February 6th.					Hinkle Fieldhouse; Indianapolis, IN
December 23, 2020; 8:00 pm, FS1		UConn	Postponed due to COVID-19 issues. Rescheduled to January 11, 2021.					Wintrust Arena; Chicago, IL
December 23, 2020*; 8:00 pm, FS1		Western Illinois	W 91–72	1–0	22 – Moore	8 – Freeman-Liberty	6 – Freeman-Liberty	Wintrust Arena (0); Chicago, IL
December 27, 2020; 3:30 pm, FS1		at Providence	L 90–95 ^{2OT}	1–1 (0–1)	21 – Weems	8 – Hall	8 – Moore	Alumni Hall (0); Providence, RI
December 30, 2020; 8:00 pm, CBSSN		at UConn	L 61–82	1–2 (0–2)	14 – Hall	8 – Tied	4 – Moore	Harry A. Gampel Pavilion (0); Storrs, CT
January 2, 2021; 11:00 am, FS1		at St. John's	Postponed due to COVID-19 issues. Rescheduled to February 20, 2021.					Carnesecca Arena; Queens, NY
January 5, 2021; 6:00 pm, FS1		No. 3 Villanova	Postponed due to COVID-19 issues					Wintrust Arena; Chicago, IL
January 9, 2021; 1:00 pm, FS1		Seton Hall	L 68–76	1–3 (0–3)	22 – Freeman-Liberty	8 – Weems	5 – Moore	Wintrust Arena (0); Chicago, IL
January 11, 2021; 5:00 pm, FS1		No. 25 UConn	L 53–60	1–4 (0–4)	10 – Hall	7 – Tied	4 – Elvis	Wintrust Arena (0); Chicago, IL
January 13, 2021; 6:00 pm, FS1		at Georgetown	Postponed due to COVID-19 issues					McDonough Gymnasium; Washington, D.C.
January 16, 2021*; 3:00 pm, FS1		Valparaiso	W 77–58	2–4	20 – Weems	10 – Hall	5 – Moore	Wintrust Arena (0); Chicago, IL
January 19, 2021; 7:00 pm, CBSSN		Butler	L 53–67	2–5 (0–5)	12 – Elvis	8 – Paulicap	2 – 5 Tied	Wintrust Arena (0); Chicago, IL
January 23, 2021; 5:00 pm, FS1		at Marquette	W 68–61	3–5 (1–5)	21 – Moore	7 – Hall	3 – Tied	Fiserv Forum (0); Milwaukee, WI
January 27, 2021; 8:00 pm, FS1		St. John's	L 68–81	3–6 (1–6)	21 – Moore	16 – Paulicap	4 – Moore	Wintrust Arena (0); Chicago, IL
January 30, 2021; 7:00 pm, CBSSN		No. 17 Creighton	L 62–69	3–7 (1–7)	21 – Salnave	8 – Freeman-Liberty	5 – Freeman-Liberty	Wintrust Arena (0); Chicago, IL
February 3, 2021; 4:00 pm, FS1		Xavier	Postponed due to COVID-19 issues					Wintrust Arena; Chicago, IL
February 6, 2021; 11:00 am, FS1		at Butler	L 58–68	3–8 (1–8)	26 – Freeman-Liberty	8 – Freeman-Liberty	4 – Salnave	Hinkle Fieldhouse (1,715); Indianapolis, IN
February 9, 2021		at No. 3 Villanova	Postponed due to COVID-19 issues					Finneran Pavilion; Villanova, PA
February 11, 2021; 2:30 pm, FS1		at Xavier	Postponed due to COVID-19 issues					Cintas Center; Cincinnati, OH
February 13, 2021; 7:00 pm, FS1		Providence	L 47–57	3–9 (1–9)	10 – Jones	11 – Ongenda	3 – Elvis	Wintrust Arena (0); Chicago, IL
February 17, 2021; 7:30 pm, FS1		at Seton Hall	L 52–60	3–10 (1–10)	15 – Paulicap	10 – Paulicap	3 – Elvis	Prudential Center (0); Newark, NJ
February 20, 2021; 6:30 pm, FS1		at St. John's	W 88–83	4–10 (2–10)	24 – Moore	9 – Paulicap	8 – Moore	Carnesecca Arena (0); Queens, NY
February 24, 2021; 8:00 pm, CBSSN		at No. 14 Creighton	L 53–77	4–11 (2–11)	9 – Tied	7 – Tied	3 – Moore	CHI Health Center Omaha (1,936); Omaha, NE
February 27, 2021; 11:00 am, FS1		Georgetown	L 60–68	4–12 (2–12)	22 – Moore	5 – Pauicap	4 – Moore	Wintrust Arena (0); Chicago, IL
March 2, 2021; 8:00 pm, FS1		Marquette	L 71–77	4–13 (2–13)	20 – Paulicap	10 – Weems	6 – Moore	Wintrust Arena (0); Chicago, IL
Big East tournament
March 10, 2021; 8:00 pm, FS1	(11)	vs. (6) Providence; First round	W 70–62	5–13	21 – Tied	8 – Paulicap	3 – Moore	Madison Square Garden (824); Manhattan, NY
March 10, 2021; 9:00 pm, FS1	(11)	vs. (3) UConn; Quarterfinals	L 60–94	5–14	19 – Freeman-Liberty	6 – Moore	2 – Tied	Madison Square Garden (824); Manhattan, NY
*Non-conference game. ^{#}Rankings from AP Poll. (#) Tournament seedings in parentheses. All times are in Central Time.
