= 2020–21 Butler Bulldogs men's basketball team =

American college basketball season

2020–21 Butler Bulldogs men's basketball
- Conference: Big East Conference
- Record: 10–15 (8–12 Big East)
- Head coach: LaVall Jordan (4th season)
- Assistant coaches: Emerson Kampen (5th season); Omar Lowery (4th season); Will Vergollo (1st season)
- Home arena: Hinkle Fieldhouse

2020–21 Big East men's basketball standings
	Conf.				Overall
Team	W		L	PCT	W		L	PCT
No. 18 Villanova	11	–	4	.733	18	–	7	.720
No. 19 Creighton	14	–	6	.700	22	–	9	.710
UConn	11	–	6	.647	15	–	8	.652
St. John's	10	–	9	.526	16	–	11	.593
Seton Hall	10	–	9	.526	14	–	13	.519
Providence	9	–	10	.474	13	–	13	.500
Xavier	6	–	7	.462	13	–	8	.619
Georgetown †	7	–	9	.438	13	–	13	.500
Marquette	8	–	11	.421	13	–	14	.481
Butler	8	–	12	.400	10	–	15	.400
DePaul	2	–	13	.133	5	–	14	.263
† 2021 Big East tournament winner Rankings from AP poll

The 2020–21 Butler Bulldogs men's basketball team represented Butler University in the 2020–21 NCAA Division I men's basketball season. They were coached by LaVall Jordan, in his fourth year as head coach of his alma mater. The Bulldogs played their home games at Hinkle Fieldhouse in Indianapolis, Indiana as members of the Big East Conference. They finished the season 10–15, 8–12 to finish in 10th place in Big East play. In the Big East tournament, they defeated Xavier in the first round before losing to Creighton in the quarterfinals.

== Previous season ==
The Bulldogs finished the 2019–20 season 23–9, 10–8 to finish in fifth place in Big East play. In the Big East tournament, they were scheduled to play Providence in the quarterfinals, but the tournament was canceled due to the ongoing COVID-19 pandemic, All remaining postseason tournaments were thereafter canceled, including the NCAA tournament, effectively ending the Bulldogs season.

== Offseason ==
=== Departures ===
Name	Number	Pos.	Height	Weight	Year	Hometown	Notes
Derrik Smits	21	C	7'1"	235	Graduate	Zionsville, IN	Completed college eligibility (Note: Smits was a graduate transfer in the 2019–20 season, having graduated from Valparaiso in 2019.)
Sean McDermott	22	G	6'6"	195	RS Senior	Pendleton, IN	Graduated
Henry Baddley	20	G/F	6'4"	185	Senior	Wadsworth, OH	Graduated
Kamar Baldwin	3	G	6'1"	190	Senior	Winder, GA	Graduated
Jordan Tucker	1	F	6'7"	220	Junior	White Plains, NY	Declared for NBA draft
Khalif Battle	4	G	6'5"	175	Freshman	Edison, NJ	Transferred to Temple

=== Incoming transfers ===
Name	Number	Pos.	Height	Weight	Year	Hometown	Notes
Jair Bolden	52	G	6'3"	210	Graduate	Brooklyn, NY	Transferred from South Carolina. Immediately eligible to play as he graduated from South Carolina. Due to an NCAA ruling that all individuals who participate in winter sports in 2020–21 will receive an extra year of eligibility, he will have two years of remaining eligibility instead of one.
Bo Hodges	–	G	6'5"	210	RS Junior	Nashville, TN	Transferred from East Tennessee State. Under NCAA transfer rules, Hodges will redshirt for the 2020–21 season and have one year of remaining eligibility.

=== Recruiting classes ===
==== 2020 recruiting class ====
College recruiting
Name	Hometown	School	Height	Weight	Commit date
Chuck Harris; PG	Washington, D.C.	Gonzaga High School	6 ft 1 in (1.85 m)	170 lb (77 kg)	May 15, 2019
Chuck Harris; PG	Recruit ratings: Scout: Rivals: 247Sports: ESPN:				
Myles Wilmoth; PF	Spring Valley, NY	St. Andrew's School	6 ft 9 in (2.06 m)	205 lb (93 kg)	Jul 3, 2019
Myles Wilmoth; PF	Recruit ratings: Scout: Rivals: 247Sports: ESPN:				
Myles Tate; PG	Roebuck, SC	Dorman High School	6 ft 0 in (1.83 m)	170 lb (77 kg)	Aug 5, 2019
Myles Tate; PG	Recruit ratings: Scout: Rivals: 247Sports: ESPN:				
Carlos Johnson; SF	Benton Harbor, MI	Benton Harbor High School	6 ft 6 in (1.98 m)	210 lb (95 kg)	Oct 2, 2019
Carlos Johnson; SF	Recruit ratings: Scout: Rivals: 247Sports: ESPN:				
Jakobe Coles; PF	Denton, TX	Guyer High School	6 ft 7 in (2.01 m)	225 lb (102 kg)	Oct 6, 2019
Jakobe Coles; PF	Recruit ratings: Scout: Rivals: 247Sports: ESPN:				
Overall recruit ranking:
Note: In many cases, Scout, Rivals, 247Sports, On3, and ESPN may conflict in their listings of height and weight.; In these cases, the average was taken. ESPN grades are on a 100-point scale.; Sources: "2020 Butler Commits". Rivals.; "ESPN- Butler Bulldogs Men's Basketball Recruiting". ESPN.; "2020 Team Ranking". Rivals.

==== 2021 recruiting class ====
College recruiting (2021)
Name	Hometown	School	Height	Weight	Commit date
Jayden Taylor; SG	Indianapolis, IN	Perry Meridian High School	6 ft 3 in (1.91 m)	170 lb (77 kg)	Sep 19, 2019
Jayden Taylor; SG	Recruit ratings: Rivals: 247Sports: ESPN:				
Pierce Thomas; SF	Brownsburg, IN	Brownsburg High School	6 ft 5 in (1.96 m)	195 lb (88 kg)	Feb 27, 2020
Pierce Thomas; SF	Recruit ratings: Rivals: 247Sports: ESPN:				
D.J. Hughes; PF	Indianapolis, IN	Lawrence North High School	6 ft 7 in (2.01 m)	215 lb (98 kg)	Jun 26, 2020
D.J. Hughes; PF	Recruit ratings: Rivals: 247Sports: ESPN:				
Overall recruit ranking:
Note: In many cases, Scout, Rivals, 247Sports, On3, and ESPN may conflict in their listings of height and weight.; In these cases, the average was taken. ESPN grades are on a 100-point scale.; Sources: "ESPN – Butler Bulldogs Men's Basketball Recruiting". ESPN.

== Roster ==
2020–21 Butler Bulldogs men's basketball team
Players
Coaches

Pos.	#	Name	Height	Weight	Year	Previous school	Hometown
G	52	Jair Bolden	6 ft 2 in (1.88 m)	210 lb (95 kg)	GS	Westtown School (South Carolina)	Brooklyn, NY
F	25	Christian David	6 ft 6 in (1.98 m)	225 lb (102 kg)	Sr	Vermont Academy	Milton, Ontario
G	2	Aaron Thompson	6 ft 2 in (1.88 m)	195 lb (88 kg)	Sr	Paul VI Catholic	Glenn Dale, MD
F	10	Bryce Nze	6 ft 7 in (2.01 m)	230 lb (104 kg)	RS Sr	Arrowhead (Milwaukee)	Hartland, WI
G	1	Bo Hodges	6 ft 5 in (1.96 m)	210 lb (95 kg)	RS Jr	Maplewood (East Tennessee State)	Nashville, TN
G	0	Campbell Donovan (W)	5 ft 11 in (1.8 m)	185 lb (84 kg)	RS Jr	Bishop Dwenger	Fort Wayne, IN
F	33	Bryce Golden	6 ft 9 in (2.06 m)	260 lb (118 kg)	Jr	St. James School	Winchester, VA
F	24	Markeese Hastings	6 ft 7 in (2.01 m)	210 lb (95 kg)	RS So	Godwin Heights	Wyoming, MI
F	30	Mike Parker (W)	6 ft 6 in (1.98 m)	210 lb (95 kg)	RS So	Coastal Christian	Wilmington, NC
F/C	35	John-Michael Mulloy	6 ft 10 in (2.08 m)	235 lb (107 kg)	So	Carmel	Carmel, IN
G	3	Chuck Harris	6 ft 2 in (1.88 m)	190 lb (86 kg)	Fr	Gonzaga College	Washington, D.C.
F	5	Myles Wilmoth	6 ft 9 in (2.06 m)	215 lb (98 kg)	Fr	St. Andrew's School	Spring Valley, NY
F	11	Carlos Johnson (injured) (redshirt)	6 ft 6 in (1.98 m)	230 lb (104 kg)	Fr	Benton Harbor	Benton Harbor, MI
G	12	Myles Tate	6 ft 0 in (1.83 m)	160 lb (73 kg)	Fr	Dorman	Roebuck, SC
F	21	JaKobe Coles	6 ft 7 in (2.01 m)	225 lb (102 kg)	Fr	Guyer	Denton, TX

Head coach

- LaVall Jordan (Butler)

Assistant coach(es)

- Emerson Kampen (Butler)
- Omar Lowery (Concordia (WI))
- Will Vergollo (Michigan)

Legend

- (C) Team captain
- (S) Suspended
- (I) Ineligible
- (W) Walk-on
- Injured
- Current redshirt

Roster
Last update: November 2, 2020

== Schedule and results ==
- Date time, TV	Rank^{#}	Opponent^{#}	Result	Record	High points	High rebounds	High assists	Site (attendance) city, state
  Regular season
  November 25, 2020*; 6:00 p.m., FS1		Western Michigan	W 66–62	1–0	21 – Thompson	9 – Bolden	4 – Thompson	Hinkle Fieldhouse (1,500); Indianapolis, IN
  November 29, 2020*; 6:30 p.m., FS1		Eastern Illinois	Cancelled due to the COVID-19 pandemic					Hinkle Fieldhouse; Indianapolis, IN
  December 6, 2020*; 7:00 p.m., FS1		Northern Kentucky	Cancelled due to the COVID-19 pandemic					Hinkle Fieldhouse; Indianapolis, IN
  December 11, 2020*; 3:00 p.m., FS1		Kansas State; Big East–Big 12 Alliance	Cancelled due to the COVID-19 pandemic					Hinkle Fieldhouse; Indianapolis, IN
  December 14, 2020; 5:00 p.m., FS1		St. John's	Postponed due to the COVID-19 pandemic					Hinkle Fieldhouse; Indianapolis, IN
  December 16, 2020; 7:00 p.m., FS1		at No. 7 Villanova	L 66–85	1–1 (0–1)	18 – Bolden	8 – Nze	6 – Thompson	Finneran Pavilion; Villanova, PA
  December 19, 2020*; 11:30 a.m., FS1		vs. Indiana; Crossroads Classic	L 60–68	1–2	20 – Bolden	10 – Nze	3 – Tied	Bankers Life Fieldhouse; Indianapolis, IN
  December 21, 2020*; 7:30 p.m., FS1		Southern Illinois	L 73–76	1–3	22 – Harris	11 – Nze	6 – Harris	Hinkle Fieldhouse (1,412); Indianapolis, IN
  December 23, 2020; 7:00 p.m., CBSSN		Providence	W 70–64	2–3 (1–1)	14 – Coles	8 – Tate	7 – Tate	Hinkle Fieldhouse (1,724); Indianapolis, IN
  December 30, 2020; 5:00 p.m., FS1		at Providence	L 55–71	2–4 (1–2)	15 – Bolden	6 – Tied	4 – Tate	Dunkin' Donuts Center; Providence, RI
  January 2, 2021; 4:30 p.m., FS1		at Seton Hall	L 60–68	2–5 (1–3)	22 – Tate	6 – Nze	5 – Tate	Prudential Center; Newark, NJ
  January 6, 2021; 7:00 p.m., FS1		Georgetown	W 63–55	3–5 (2–3)	18 – Harris	7 – Hastings	5 – Harris	Hinkle Fieldhouse (1,355); Indianapolis, IN
  January 9, 2021; 4:00 p.m., FS1		UConn	L 60–72	3–6 (2–4)	18 – Nze	6 – Nze	6 – Thompson	Hinkle Fieldhouse (1,879); Indianapolis, IN
  January 12, 2021; 7:00 p.m., FS1		at St. John's	L 57–69	3–7 (2–5)	17 – Bolden	14 – Nze	5 – Nze	Carnesecca Arena; Queens, NY
  January 16, 2021; 2:00 p.m., FOX		No. 8 Creighton	W 70–66 ^{OT}	4–7 (3–5)	17 – Thompson	10 – Tate	6 – Thompson	Hinkle Fieldhouse (1,693); Indianapolis, IN
  January 19, 2021; 7:00 p.m., CBSSN		at DePaul	W 67–53	5–7 (4–5)	21 – Bolden	14 – Nze	4 – Tied	Wintrust Arena; Chicago, IL
  January 22, 2021; 9:00 p.m., FS1		Seton Hall	Postponed due to the COVID-19 pandemic					Hinkle Fieldhouse; Indianapolis, IN
  January 26, 2021; 8:30 p.m., FS1		at UConn	L 51–63	5–8 (4–6)	19 – Golden	9 – Nze	3 – Nze	Harry A. Gampel Pavilion; Storrs, CT
  January 29, 2021; 5:30 p.m., FS1		Xavier	L 55–68	5–9 (4–7)	16 – Nze	11 – Nze	2 – 3 Tied	Hinkle Fieldhouse (2,084); Indianapolis, IN
  February 2, 2021; 5:00 p.m., FS1		at Marquette	L 67–70	5–10 (4–8)	16 – Harris	12 – Hodges	8 – Hodges	Fiserv Forum; Milwaukee, WI
  February 6, 2021; 12:00 p.m., FS1		DePaul	W 68–58	6–10 (5–8)	22 – Tied	10 – Hodges	5 – Thompson	Hinkle Fieldhouse (1,715); Indianapolis, IN
  February 9, 2021; 9:00 p.m., FS1		St. John's	W 76–73 ^{OT}	7–10 (6–8)	19 – Nze	10 – Nze	10 – Thompson	Hinkle Fieldhouse (1,416); Indianapolis, IN
  February 13, 2021; 1:30 p.m., CBSSN		at Georgetown	L 63–78	7–11 (6–9)	12 – 3 Tied	5 – Hodges	11 – Thompson	Capital One Arena; Washington, D.C.
  February 17, 2021; 6:30 p.m., FS1		Marquette	L 57–73	7–12 (6–10)	21 – Harris	5 – Harris	3 – Tied	Hinkle Fieldhouse (1,389); Indianapolis, IN
  February 21, 2021; 7:00 p.m., FS1		at Xavier	L 51–63	7–13 (6–11)	14 – Harris	12 – Golden	6 – Harris	Cintas Center (922); Cincinnati, OH
  February 24, 2021; 7:00 p.m., CBSSN		Seton Hall	W 61–52	8–13 (7–11)	16 – Bolden	13 – Nze	5 – Harris	Hinkle Fieldhouse (1,524); Indianapolis, IN
  February 28, 2021; 12:00 p.m., CBS		No. 8 Villanova	W 73–61	9–13 (8–11)	20 – Harris	11 – Nze	5 – Nze	Hinkle Fieldhouse (2,203); Indianapolis, IN
  March 6, 2021; 5:00 p.m., FOX		at No. 14 Creighton	L 73–93	9–14 (8–12)	29 – Harris	6 – Tied	4 – Tied	CHI Health Center Omaha (2,419); Omaha, NE
  Big East tournament
  March 10, 2021; 9:00 p.m., FS1	(10)	vs. (7) Xavier; First round	W 70–69	10–14	21 – Harris	9 – Golden	3 – Tate	Madison Square Garden; New York, NY
  March 11, 2021; 6:00 p.m., FS1	(10)	vs. (2) No. 17 Creighton; Quarterfinal	L 56–87	10–15	21 – Nze	6 – Nze	3 – Nze	Madison Square Garden; New York, NY
  *Non-conference game. ^{#}Rankings from AP Poll. (#) Tournament seedings in parentheses. All times are in Eastern Time.

== Rankings ==
Ranking movements Legend: — = Not ranked
	Week																			
Poll	Pre	1	2	3	4	5	6	7	8	9	10	11	12	13	14	15	16	17	18	Final
AP	—	—																		
Coaches	—	—																		

*AP does not release post-NCAA tournament rankings.

== Awards ==
Name	Award(s)
