= 2020–21 Georgetown Hoyas men's basketball team =

American college basketball season

2020–21 Georgetown Hoyas men's basketball

Big East tournament champions

NCAA tournament, first round
- Conference: Big East
- Record: 13–13 (7–9 Big East)
- Head coach: Patrick Ewing (4th season)
- Assistant coaches: Louis Orr; Robert Kirby; Akbar Waheed
- Captain: No captain
- Home arena: McDonough Gymnasium

2020–21 Big East men's basketball standings
	Conf.				Overall
Team	W		L	PCT	W		L	PCT
No. 18 Villanova	11	–	4	.733	18	–	7	.720
No. 19 Creighton	14	–	6	.700	22	–	9	.710
UConn	11	–	6	.647	15	–	8	.652
St. John's	10	–	9	.526	16	–	11	.593
Seton Hall	10	–	9	.526	14	–	13	.519
Providence	9	–	10	.474	13	–	13	.500
Xavier	6	–	7	.462	13	–	8	.619
Georgetown †	7	–	9	.438	13	–	13	.500
Marquette	8	–	11	.421	13	–	14	.481
Butler	8	–	12	.400	10	–	15	.400
DePaul	2	–	13	.133	5	–	14	.263
† 2021 Big East tournament winner Rankings from AP poll

The 2020–21 Georgetown Hoyas men's basketball team represented Georgetown University in the 2020–21 NCAA Division I men's basketball season. The Hoyas, led by fourth-year head coach Patrick Ewing, were members of the Big East Conference. Although the Hoyas normally play their home games at the Capital One Arena in Washington, D.C., public-health restrictions due to the ongoing COVID-19 pandemic forced Georgetown to play its home games on campus at McDonough Gymnasium without fans.

UConn (Connecticut) joined the Big East Conference this season. Like Georgetown a founding member of the original Big East Conference of 1979–2013, UConn had remained behind in the old conference — which renamed itself the American Athletic Conference, marketed as "The American" — when Georgetown and six other schools left it to form the new Big East Conference in 2013. Georgetown and UConn had played only twice since then, in non-conference games in 2016 and 2017, but UConn's move to the Big East allowed the conference rivalry between the schools to resume in 2020–2021.

UConn's move to the Big East also expanded the Big East regular season. Beginning in 2020–2021, each Big East team was scheduled to play 20 regular-season conference games rather than the 18 they had played each year from the 2013–2014 through 2019–2020 seasons. However, the cancellation of some games during 2020-2021 due to COVID-19 issues resulted in only two teams playing their full slate of 20 games. The Hoyas played only 16 conference games during the 2020–2021 season.

Despite having nine new players and a preseason consensus that they would finish at the bottom of the Big East, the Hoyas had an unexpectedly successful season. They finished in eighth place in the Big East during the regular season, then won the 2021 Big East men's basketball tournament — their first Big East championship since 2007 — to earn an automatic bid to the 2021 NCAA Division I men's basketball tournament, their first appearance in the tournament since 2015. They lost in the first round to Colorado.

== Previous season ==
The Hoyas finished the 2019–20 season at 15–17, 5–13 in Big East play, and tied for eighth place in the conference. As the No. 8 seed in the Big East tournament, they lost in the first round to St. John's. The following day, the remainder of the Big East tournament and all other NCAA postseason play was canceled because of the COVID-19 pandemic. Georgetown finished the season with an overall losing record for the third time in five years and with a 5–13 conference record for the third time in four years.

== Offseason ==
=== Departures ===
Name	Number	Pos.	Height	Weight	Year	Hometown	Reason
Mac McClung	2	G	6'2"	186	Sophomore	Gate City, VA	Transferred to Texas Tech
James Akinjo	3	G	6'0"	160	Sophomore	Richmond, CA	Transferred midseason to Arizona
Jagan Mosely	4	G	6'3"	215	Senior	Morganville, NJ	Graduated
Galen Alexander	11	F	6'6"	227	Junior	Breaux Bridge, LA	Transferred midseason to Texas Southern
Terrell Allen	12	G	6'3"	180	Grad Student	Upper Marlboro, MD	Completed eligibility
Myron Gardner	15	F	6'6"	222	Freshman	Detroit, MI	Transferred midseason to South Plains College
George Mureșan	20	F	6'9"	218	Senior	Potomac, MD	Graduated
Josh LeBlanc	23	F	6'7"	213	Sophomore	Baton Rouge, LA	Transferred midseason to LSU
Ömer Yurtseven	44	C	7'0"	264	RS Junior	Istanbul, Turkey	Declared for 2020 NBA draft

=== Incoming transfers ===
Name	Number	Pos.	Height	Weight	Year	Hometown	Previous school
Jalen Harris	3	G	6'2"	166	Graduate Student	Raleigh, NC	Arkansas
Chudier Bile	4	F	6'7"	195	Graduate Student	Denver, CO	Northwestern State
Donald Carey	13	G	6'5"	187	Graduate Student	Upper Marlboro, MD	Siena

=== 2020 recruiting class ===
College recruiting information
Name	Hometown	School	Height	Weight	Commit date
Dante Harris; PG	Alcoa, TN	Lakeway Christian Academy	6 ft 0 in (1.83 m)	170 lb (77 kg)	Oct 29, 2019
Dante Harris; PG	Recruit ratings: Scout: Rivals: 247Sports: (NR)				
Jamari Sibley; PF	Milwaukee, WI	Oak Hill Academy (VA)	6 ft 8 in (2.03 m)	200 lb (91 kg)	Nov 29, 2019
Jamari Sibley; PF	Recruit ratings: Scout: Rivals: 247Sports: (82)				
Kobe Clark; SG	St. Louis, MO	Vashon High School	6 ft 4 in (1.93 m)	180 lb (82 kg)	Feb 20, 2020
Kobe Clark; SG	Recruit ratings: Scout: Rivals: 247Sports: (77)				
T. J. Berger; PG	Malvern, PA	Westtown School	6 ft 3 in (1.91 m)	170 lb (77 kg)	May 13, 2020
T. J. Berger; PG	Recruit ratings: Rivals: (NR)				
Collin Holloway; SF	Baton Rouge, LA	Port Allen High School	6 ft 6 in (1.98 m)	220 lb (100 kg)	Jun 3, 2020
Collin Holloway; SF	Recruit ratings: No ratings found				
Overall recruit ranking:
Note: In many cases, Scout, Rivals, 247Sports, On3, and ESPN may conflict in their listings of height and weight.; In these cases, the average was taken. ESPN grades are on a 100-point scale.; Sources: "2020 Team Ranking". Rivals.

== Roster ==
2020–21 Georgetown Hoyas men's basketball team
Players
Coaches

Pos.	#	Name	Height	Weight	Year	Previous school	Hometown
G	0	Jahvon Blair	6 ft 4 in (1.93 m)	190 lb (86 kg)	Sr	Orangeburg Prep	Brampton, ON
G/F	1	Jamorko Pickett	6 ft 9 in (2.06 m)	206 lb (93 kg)	Sr	Massanutten Military Academy	Washington, D.C.
G	2	Dante Harris	6 ft 0 in (1.83 m)	170 lb (77 kg)	Fr	Lakeway Christian Academy	Washington, D.C.
G	3	Jalen Harris	6 ft 2 in (1.88 m)	166 lb (75 kg)	GS	Arkansas	Wilson, NC
F	4	Chudier Bile	6 ft 7 in (2.01 m)	195 lb (88 kg)	GS	Northwestern State	Denver, CO
C	5	Timothy Ighoefe	7 ft 0 in (2.13 m)	250 lb (113 kg)	So	NBA Academy Africa	Lagos, Nigeria
G	10	Chuma Azinge (W)	6 ft 3 in (1.91 m)	183 lb (83 kg)	So	Choate Rosemary Hall	San Marino, CA
G	13	Donald Carey	6 ft 5 in (1.96 m)	187 lb (85 kg)	GS	Siena	Upper Marlboro, MD
F	14	Jamari Sibley	6 ft 8 in (2.03 m)	200 lb (91 kg)	Fr	Oak Hill Academy (VA)	Milwaukee, WI
G	20	T. J. Berger	6 ft 4 in (1.93 m)	170 lb (77 kg)	Fr	Westtown School	West Chester, PA
G	22	Jaden Robinson (W)	6 ft 3 in (1.91 m)	185 lb (84 kg)	Jr	Mount Saint Joseph HS	Baltimore, MD
F	23	Collin Holloway	6 ft 6 in (1.98 m)	220 lb (100 kg)	Fr	Port Allen High School	Baton Rouge, LA
F	24	Kobe Clark	6 ft 4 in (1.93 m)	180 lb (82 kg)	Fr	Vashon HS	St. Louis, MO
C	32	Malcolm Wilson	7 ft 0 in (2.13 m)	205 lb (93 kg)	RS So	Ridge View HS	Columbia, SC
C	34	Qudus Wahab	6 ft 11 in (2.11 m)	237 lb (108 kg)	So	Flint Hill Prep (VA)	Lagos, Nigeria
F	55	Victor Muresan (W)	6 ft 10 in (2.08 m)	190 lb (86 kg)	Fr	Georgetown Day School	Potomac, MD

Head coach

- Patrick Ewing (Georgetown)

Assistant coach(es)

- Louis Orr (Syracuse)
- Robert Kirby (UTRGV)
- Akbar Waheed (Niagara)

Legend

- (C) Team captain
- (S) Suspended
- (I) Ineligible
- (W) Walk-on
- Injured
- Current redshirt

Roster
Last update: November 25, 2020

Notes: (1) On December 18, Georgetown announced that Jalen Harris was taking a leave of absence from the team for "family reasons;" he did not return. (2) Chuma Azinge was a "recruited walk-on."

== Schedule and results ==
Date time, TV	Rank^{#}	Opponent^{#}	Result	Record	High points	High rebounds	High assists	Site (attendance) city, state
Regular season
November 25, 2020*; 4:00 p.m., FS1		UMBC	W 70–62	1–0	23 – Blair	12 – Wahab	6 – J. Harris	McDonough Gymnasium (0); Washington, D.C.
December 1, 2020*; 7:00 p.m., CBSSN		Navy	L 71–78	1–1	17 – Blair/Pickett	9 – Carey	7 – J. Harris	McDonough Gymnasium (0); Washington, D.C.
December 6, 2020*; 4:30 p.m., FS1		No. 11 West Virginia; Big East/Big 12 Battle	L 71–80	1–2	19 – Blair	9 – Wahab	8 – J. Harris	McDonough Gymnasium (0); Washington, D.C.
December 8, 2020*; 7:00 p.m., FS1		Coppin State	W 80–48	2–2	23 – Blair	18 – Pickett	4 – Blair	McDonough Gymnasium (0); Washington, D.C.
December 11, 2020; 7:00 p.m., FS1		No. 9 Villanova	L 63–76	2–3 (0–1)	16 – Pickett	11 – Pickett	3 – Blair	McDonough Gymnasium (0); Washington, D.C.
December 13, 2020; 7:30 p.m., FS1		UConn; Rivalry	Postponed (COVID-19 pandemic); Rescheduled for February 23					McDonough Gymnasium (–); Washington, D.C.
December 13, 2020; 7:30 p.m., FS1		St. John's; Rivalry	W 97–94 ^{OT}	3–3 (1–1)	22 – D. Harris	5 – Bile/Wahab	5 – Bair/Carey	McDonough Gymnasium (0); Washington, D.C.
December 20, 2020; 6:36 p.m., FS1		at St. John's; Rivalry	L 83–94	3–4 (1–2)	25 – Blair	11 – Pickett	6 – Blair	Carnesecca Arena (0); Queens, NY
December 23, 2020; 5:00 p.m., FS1		at Seton Hall	L 67–78	3–5 (1–3)	16 – Wahab	13 – Wahab	3 – Tied	Prudential Center (0); Newark, NJ
December 30, 2020; 9:15 p.m., FS1		No. 11 Creighton	Postponed (COVID-19 pandemic); Rescheduled for February 9					McDonough Gymnasium (–); Washington, D.C.
January 2, 2021; 7:30 p.m., CBSSN		Marquette	L 60–64	3–6 (1–4)	20 – Blair	10 – Wahab	5 – D. Harris	McDonough Gymnasium (0); Washington, D.C.
January 6, 2021; 7:00 p.m., FS1		at Butler	L 55–63	3–7 (1–5)	12 – Pickett	12 – Wahab	4 – Pickett	Hinkle Fieldhouse (1,355); Indianapolis, IN
January 9, 2021*; 7:00 pm., ESPN		at Syracuse; Rivalry	L 69–74	3–8	17 – Pickett	9 – Pickett	10 – Blair	Carrier Dome (0); Syracuse, NY
January 13, 2021; 8:30 p.m., FS1		DePaul	Canceled (COVID-19 pandemic); No make-up game was scheduled					McDonough Gymnasium (–); Washington, D.C.
January 16, 2021; 12:00 p.m., FS1		at Providence	Canceled (COVID-19 pandemic); No make-up game was scheduled					Dunkin' Donuts Center (–); Providence, RI
January 20, 2021; 7:00 p.m., FS1		at Marquette	Canceled (COVID-19 pandemic); No make-up game was scheduled					Fiserv Forum (–); Milwaukee, WI
January 26, 2021; 6:30 p.m., FS1		at Xavier	Canceled (COVID-19 pandemic); No make-up game was scheduled					Cintas Center (–); Cincinnati, OH
January 30, 2021; 1:00 p.m., CBS		Providence	W 73–72	4–8 (2–5)	19 – Bile	6 – Tied	5 – D. Harris	McDonough Gymnasium (0); Washington, D.C.
February 3, 2021; 9:15 p.m., FS1		at No. 15 Creighton	W 86–79	5–8 (3–5)	22 – Blair	9 – Wahab	7 – Blair	CHI Health Center Omaha (1,845); Omaha, NE
February 7, 2021; 2:35 p.m., FOX		at No. 3 Villanova	L 74–84	5–9 (3–6)	17 – Wahab	8 – Pickett	5 – Blair	Finneran Pavilion (0); Villanova, PA
February 9, 2021; 9:05 p.m., CBSSN		No. 19 Creighton	L 48–63	5–10 (3–7)	16 – Pickett	12 – Pickett	5 – Blair	McDonough Gymnasium (0); Washington, D.C.
February 13, 2021; 12:30 p.m., CBSSN		Butler	W 78–63	6–10 (4–7)	17 – Tied	9 – Wahab	6 – Blair	McDonough Gymnasium (0); Washington, D.C.
February 20, 2021; 5:30 p.m., CBSSN		Seton Hall	W 81–75	7–10 (5–7)	20 – Pickett	11 – Wahab	8 – D. Harris	McDonough Gymnasium (0); Washington, D.C.
February 23, 2021; 9:10 p.m., FS1		UConn; Rivalry	L 57–70	7–11 (5–8)	18 – Wahab	10 – Wahab	3 – Tied	McDonough Gymnasium (0); Washington, D.C.
February 27, 2021; 12:00 p.m., FS1		at DePaul	W 68–60	8–11 (6–8)	19 – Bile	10 – Bile	5 – D. Harris	Wintrust Arena (0); Chicago, IL
March 2, 2021; 7:00 p.m., FS1		Xavier	W 72–66	9–11 (7–8)	18 – Pickett	11 – Bile	3 – Blair	McDonough Gymnasium (0); Washington, D.C.
March 6, 2021; 12:00 p.m., CBS		at UConn; Rivalry	L 82–98	9–12 (7–9)	22 – Blair	7 – Wahab	6 – D. Harris	Harry A. Gampel Pavilion (0); Storrs, CT
Big East tournament
March 10, 2021; 3:05 p.m., FS1	(8)	vs. (9) Marquette; First Round	W 68–49	10–12	20 – Blair	8 – Tied	3 – Carey	Madison Square Garden (824 (Note: Combined attendance for that day′s entire slate of Big East tournament games.) (Note: Due to severe New York state restrictions on building occupancy during the COVID-19 pandemic, Madison Square Garden sold no 2021 Big East tournament tickets to the general public. Each team received a limited number of tickets for use by family and friends of the players and staff.)); New York, NY
March 11, 2021; 12:05 p.m., FS1	(8)	vs. (1) No. 14 Villanova; Quarterfinals	W 72–71	11–12	18 – D. Harris	8 – Pickett	5 – D. Harris	Madison Square Garden (824); New York, NY
March 12, 2021; 6:05 p.m., FS1	(8)	vs. (5) Seton Hall; Semifinals	W 66–58	12–12	19 – Pickett	8 – Wahab	3 – Blair	Madison Square Garden (824); New York, NY
March 13, 2021; 9:00 p.m., FOX	(8)	vs. (2) No. 17 Creighton; Championship	W 73–48	13–12	19 – Bile	12 – Wahab	5 – Harris	Madison Square Garden (824); New York, NY
NCAA tournament
March 20, 2021; 12:15 p.m., CBS	(12 E)	vs. (5 E) No. 22 Colorado; First Round	L 73–96	13–13	20 – Wahab	12 – Wahab	6 – Pickett	Hinkle Fieldhouse (N/A); Indianapolis, IN
*Non-conference game. ^{#}Rankings from AP Poll. (#) Tournament seedings in parentheses. All times are in Eastern Time.

== Awards and honors ==
=== Big East Conference honors ===
Weekly honors
Honors	Player	Position	Date awarded	Ref.
Big East Men’s Basketball Freshman of the Week	Dante Harris	G	December 14, 2020	

Postseason honors
Honors	Player	Position	Date awarded	Ref.
All-Big East Honorable Mention	Jahvon Blair	G	March 7, 2021	
