= 2020–21 Big East Conference men's basketball season =

- League: NCAA Division I
- Sport: Basketball
- Teams: 11
- TV partner(s): CBS, CBSSN, FOX, FS1

Regular Season
- Season champions: Villanova
- Season MVP: Collin Gillespie, Jeremiah Robinson-Earl, Sandro Mamukelashvili

Tournament
- Champions: Georgetown
- Runners-up: Creighton
- Finals MVP: Dante Harris

Basketball seasons
- ← 2019–20 2021–22 →

2020–21 Big East men's basketball standings
	Conf.				Overall
Team	W		L	PCT	W		L	PCT
No. 18 Villanova	11	–	4	.733	18	–	7	.720
No. 19 Creighton	14	–	6	.700	22	–	9	.710
UConn	11	–	6	.647	15	–	8	.652
St. John's	10	–	9	.526	16	–	11	.593
Seton Hall	10	–	9	.526	14	–	13	.519
Providence	9	–	10	.474	13	–	13	.500
Xavier	6	–	7	.462	13	–	8	.619
Georgetown †	7	–	9	.438	13	–	13	.500
Marquette	8	–	11	.421	13	–	14	.481
Butler	8	–	12	.400	10	–	15	.400
DePaul	2	–	13	.133	5	–	14	.263
† 2021 Big East tournament winner Rankings from AP poll

The 2020–21 Big East Conference men's basketball season began with practices in October 2020, followed by the start of the 2020–21 NCAA Division I men's basketball season in November. Conference play began in January 2021.

== Head coaches ==
=== Coaches ===
Team	Head coach	Previous job	Years at school	Overall record	Big East record	Big East titles	NCAA Tournaments	NCAA Final Fours	NCAA Championships
Butler	LaVall Jordan	Milwaukee	4	50–32	17–20	0	1	0	0
UConn	Dan Hurley	Rhode Island	3	42–30	0–0	0	0	0	0
Creighton	Greg McDermott	Iowa State	10	217–111	56–52	0	5	0	0
DePaul	Dave Leitao	Tulsa (asst.)	8	118–117	46–74	0	0	0	0
Georgetown	Patrick Ewing	Charlotte Hornets (asst.)	3	49–46	19–35	0	0	0	0
Marquette	Steve Wojciechowski	Duke (asst.)	6	107–72	43–48	0	2	0	0
Providence	Ed Cooley	Fairfield	9	170–116	72–73	1	5	0	0
Seton Hall	Kevin Willard	Iona	10	179–131	70–90	0	3	0	0
St. John's	Mike Anderson	Arkansas	1	11–3	0–0	0	0	0	0
Villanova	Jay Wright	Hofstra	19	457–177	203–105	7	14	3	2
Xavier	Travis Steele	Xavier (asst.)	2	29–18	9–9	0	0	0	0

Notes:

- Years at school includes 2020–21 season.
- Overall and Big East records are from time at current school and are through week nine of the 2019–20 season.
- McDermott's MVC conference records and Hurley's AAC records not included since team began play in the Big East.

== Preseason ==
=== Preseason poll ===
Prior to the season, the Big East conducted a poll of Big East coaches. Coaches do not place their own team on their ballots.

Rank	Team
1.	Villanova (9)
2.	Creighton (2)
3.	Providence
4.	UConn
5.	Seton Hall
6.	Marquette
7.	Xavier
8.	Butler
9.	St. John's
10.	DePaul
11.	Georgetown
(first place votes)

=== Preseason All-Big East teams ===
Honor	Recipient
Preseason Player of the Year	Marcus Zegarowski, Creighton
Preseason Freshman of the Year	Dawson Garcia, Marquette
Preseason All-Big East First Team	Charlie Moore, DePaul
Preseason All-Big East First Team	David Duke, Providence
Preseason All-Big East First Team	Sandro Mamukelashvili, Seton Hall
Preseason All-Big East First Team	Collin Gillespie, Villanova
Preseason All-Big East First Team	Jeremiah Robinson-Earl, Villanova
Preseason All-Big East Second Team	Bryce Nze, Butler
Preseason All-Big East Second Team	James Bouknight, UConn
Preseason All-Big East Second Team	Mitch Ballock, Creighton
Preseason All-Big East Second Team	Nate Watson, Providence
Preseason All-Big East Second Team	Justin Moore, Villanova
Preseason All-Big East Second Team	Paul Scruggs, Xavier
Preseason All-Big East Honorable Mention	D. J. Carton, Marquette
Preseason All-Big East Honorable Mention	Bryce Aiken, Seton Hall

*Schedule Source:

== Regular season ==
=== Rankings ===
Legend
Increase in ranking
Decrease in ranking
Not ranked previous week
() First place votes

		Pre	Wk 2	Wk 3	Wk 4	Wk 5	Wk 6	Wk 7	Wk 8	Wk 9	Wk 10	Wk 11	Wk 12	Wk 13	Wk 14	Wk 15	Wk 16	Wk 17	Wk 18	Wk 19	Final
Butler	AP																				
Butler	C																				
Creighton	AP																				
Creighton	C																				
DePaul	AP																				
DePaul	C																				
Georgetown	AP																				
Georgetown	C																				
Marquette	AP																				
Marquette	C																				
Providence	AP																				
Providence	C																				
Seton Hall	AP																				
Seton Hall	C																				
St. John's	AP																				
St. John's	C																				
Villanova	AP																				
Villanova	C																				
Xavier	AP																				
Xavier	C																				

=== Conference matrix ===
This table summarizes the head-to-head results between teams in conference play.

	Butler	UConn	Creighton	DePaul	Georgetown	Marquette	Providence	Seton Hall	St. John's	Villanova	Xavier
vs. Butler	–	2–0	1–1	0–2	1–1	2–0	1–1	1–1	1–1	1–1	2–0
vs. UConn	0–2	–	2–0	0–2	0–2	0–2	1–1	1–1	1–0	1–0	0–1
vs. Creighton	1–1	0–2	–	0–2	1–1	1–1	1–1	0–2	0–2	1–1	1–1
vs. DePaul	2–0	2–0	2–0	–	1–0	1–1	2–0	2–0	1–1	0–0	0–1
vs. Georgetown	1–1	2–0	1–1	0–1	–	1–0	0–1	1–1	1–1	2–0	0–0
vs. Marquette	0–2	2–0	1–1	1–1	0–1	–	1–1	2–0	1–1	2–0	1–1
vs. Providence	1–1	1–1	1–1	0–2	1–0	1–1	–	1–1	2–0	1–1	1–1
vs. Seton Hall	1–1	1–1	2–0	0–2	1–1	0–2	1–1	–	1–1	2–0	0–1
vs. St. John's	1–1	0–1	2–0	1–1	1–1	1–1	0–2	1–1	–	1–1	1–1
vs. Villanova	1–1	0–1	1–1	0–0	0–2	0–2	1–1	0–2	1–1	–	0–0
vs. Xavier	0–2	1–0	1–1	0–0	1–0	1–1	1–1	1–0	1–1	0–0	–
Total	8–12	11–6	14–6	2–13	7–9	8–11	9–10	10–9	10–9	11–4	6–7

=== Player of the week ===
Throughout the season, the Big East Conference named a player of the week and a freshman of the week each Monday.

Week	Player of the week	Freshman of the week
November 30, 2020	Jeremiah Robinson-Earl, Villanova	Dawson Garcia, Marquette
December 7, 2020	Zach Freemantle, Xavier	Justin Lewis, Marquette
December 14, 2020	David Duke, Providence	Dante Harris, Georgetown
December 21, 2020	Paul Scruggs, Xavier	Posh Alexander, St. John's
December 28, 2020	Myles Cale, Seton Hall	Chuck Harris, Butler
January 4, 2021	Sandro Mamukelashvili, Seton Hall	Dawson Garcia (2), Marquette
January 11, 2021	Tyler Polley, Connecticut	Colby Jones, Xavier
January 18, 2021	Julian Champagnie, St. John's	Dawson Garcia (3), Marquette
January 25, 2021	Jermaine Samuels, Villanova	Posh Alexander (2), St. John's
February 1, 2021	Marcus Zegarowski, Creighton	Posh Alexander (3), St. John's
February 8, 2021	Sandro Mamukelashvili (2), Seton Hall	Posh Alexander (4), St. John's
February 15, 2021	David Duke (2), Providence	Adama Sanogo, Connecticut
February 22, 2021	Charlie Moore	Colby Jones (2), Xavier
March 1, 2021	R. J. Cole, Connecticut	Chuck Harris (2), Butler
March 7, 2021	Julian Champagnie (2), St. John's	Adama Sanogo (2), Connecticut

== Honors and awards ==
=== Big East Awards ===
2021 Big East Men's Basketball Individual Awards
Award	Recipient(s)
Player of the Year	Sandro Mamukelashvili, F., Seton Hall; Collin Gillespie, G., Villanova; Jeremiah Robinson-Earl, F., Villanova
Coach of the Year	Mike Anderson, St. John's
Defensive Player of the Year	Isaiah Whaley, F., Connecticut; Posh Alexander, G., St. John's
Freshman of the Year	Posh Alexander, G., St. John's
Most Improved Player of the Year	Julian Champagnie, G./F., St. John's; Zach Freemantle, F., Xavier
Scholar-Athlete of the Year	Ike Obiagu, C., Seton Hall
Sixth Man Award	Tyler Polley, F., Connecticut
Sportsmanship Award	Mitch Ballock, G., Creighton

2021 Big East Men's Basketball All-Conference Teams
First Team	Second Team	Honorable Mention	All-Freshman Team
Marcus Zegarowski – Creighton; James Bouknight – Connecticut; Julian Champagnie – St. John's; Sandro Mamukelashvili* – Seton Hall; Jeremiah Robinson-Earl* – Villanova; Collin Gillespie – Villanova	Damien Jefferson – Creighton; David Duke – Providence; Nate Watson – Providence; Zach Freemantle – Xavier; Paul Scruggs – Xavier	Denzel Mahoney - Creighton; Jahvon Blair - Georgetown; Jermaine Samuels - Villanova	Chuck Harris* – Butler; Adama Sanogo – Connecticut; Dawson Garcia* – Marquette; Posh Alexander* – St. John's; Colby Jones – Xavier
* - denotes unanimous selection † - Due to a tie in the voting, an additional position was added
