= 2020–21 St. John's Red Storm men's basketball team =

American college basketball season

2020–21 St. John's Red Storm men's basketball
- Conference: Big East Conference
- Record: 16–11 (10–9 Big East)
- Head coach: Mike Anderson (2nd season)
- Associate head coach: T.J. Cleveland
- Assistant coaches: Van Macon; Steve DeMeo
- Home arena: Carnesecca Arena; Madison Square Garden

2020–21 Big East men's basketball standings
	Conf.				Overall
Team	W		L	PCT	W		L	PCT
No. 18 Villanova	11	–	4	.733	18	–	7	.720
No. 19 Creighton	14	–	6	.700	22	–	9	.710
UConn	11	–	6	.647	15	–	8	.652
St. John's	10	–	9	.526	16	–	11	.593
Seton Hall	10	–	9	.526	14	–	13	.519
Providence	9	–	10	.474	13	–	13	.500
Xavier	6	–	7	.462	13	–	8	.619
Georgetown †	7	–	9	.438	13	–	13	.500
Marquette	8	–	11	.421	13	–	14	.481
Butler	8	–	12	.400	10	–	15	.400
DePaul	2	–	13	.133	5	–	14	.263
† 2021 Big East tournament winner Rankings from AP poll

The 2020–21 St. John's Red Storm men's basketball team represented St. John's University during the 2020–21 NCAA Division I men's basketball season. They are coached by Mike Anderson, in his second year at the school, and play their home games at Carnesecca Arena and Madison Square Garden as members of the Big East Conference. They finished the season 16-11, 10-9 in Big East Play to finish in 4th place. They lost in the quarterfinals of the Big East tournament to Seton Hall.

== Previous season ==
The Red Storm finished the season 17–15, 5–13 in Big East play to finish in a tie for eighth place. As the No. 9 seed in the Big East tournament, they defeated Georgetown in the first round before having their quarterfinal game against Creighton canceled at halftime due to the ongoing coronavirus pandemic.

== Offseason ==
=== Departures ===
Name	Number	Pos.	Height	Weight	Year	Hometown	Notes
Mustapha Heron	0	G	6'5"	205	Senior	Waterbury, CT	Graduated
Thomas O'Connell	12	G	6'2"	195	Graduate Student	Mineola, NY	Graduated
Damien Sears	15	F	6'7"	230	RS Junior	Haughton, LA	Graduated; Transferred to Nicholls State
Justin Cole	23	G	6'2"	190	Senior	Rockville Centre, NY	Graduated
Nick Rutherford	24	G	6'3"	185	Graduate Student	Indianapolis, IN	Graduated
L. J. Figueroa	20	G/F	6'6"	200	Junior	Lawrence, MA	Transferred to Oregon
Ian Steere	33	F	6'9"	245	Sophomore	Sanford, NC	Transferred to UNC Wilmington

=== Incoming transfers ===
Name	Pos.	Height	Weight	Year	Hometown	Previous school
Arnaldo Toro	F	6'8"	240	Graduate student	Hormigueros, Puerto Rico	George Washington
Isaih Moore	F	6'10"	205	Junior	Columbia, South Carolina	Pearl River Community College
Vince Cole	G	6'6"	185	Junior	Charleston, South Carolina	USC Salkehatchie

=== 2020 recruiting class ===
College recruiting information
Name	Hometown	School	Height	Weight	Commit date
Posh Alexander; PG	Brooklyn, NY	Our Saviour Lutheran School	6 ft 0 in (1.83 m)	205 lb (93 kg)	Aug 22, 2019
Posh Alexander; PG	Recruit ratings: Rivals: 247Sports: ESPN: (80)				
Dylan Addae-Wusu; SG	Yonkers, NY	Our Saviour Lutheran School	6 ft 4 in (1.93 m)	235 lb (107 kg)	Sep 28, 2019
Dylan Addae-Wusu; SG	Recruit ratings: Rivals: 247Sports: (NR)				
Overall recruit ranking:
Note: In many cases, Scout, Rivals, 247Sports, On3, and ESPN may conflict in their listings of height and weight.; In these cases, the average was taken. ESPN grades are on a 100-point scale.; Sources: "2020 Team Ranking". Rivals.

=== 2021 Recruiting class ===
College recruiting information (2021)
Name	Hometown	School	Height	Weight	Commit date
Rafael Pinzon; SG	Arecibo, Puerto Rico	Long Island Lutheran	6 ft 5 in (1.96 m)	180 lb (82 kg)	Sep 14, 2020
Rafael Pinzon; SG	Recruit ratings: Rivals: 247Sports: ESPN: (79)				
Drissa Traore; PF	Harlem, NY	Long Island Lutheran	6 ft 7 in (2.01 m)	210 lb (95 kg)	Aug 3, 2020
Drissa Traore; PF	Recruit ratings: Rivals: 247Sports: ESPN: (76)				
O'mar Stanley; C	Kansas City, MO	Link Year Prep (MO)	6 ft 8 in (2.03 m)	240 lb (110 kg)	Nov 13, 2020
O'mar Stanley; C	Recruit ratings: Rivals: 247Sports: (NR)				
Overall recruit ranking:
Note: In many cases, Scout, Rivals, 247Sports, On3, and ESPN may conflict in their listings of height and weight.; In these cases, the average was taken. ESPN grades are on a 100-point scale.; Sources: "2021 Team Ranking". Rivals.

== Roster ==
2020–21 St. John's Red Storm men's basketball team
Players
Coaches

Pos.	#	Name	Height	Weight	Year	Previous school	Hometown
G	0	Posh Alexander	6 ft 0 in (1.83 m)	190 lb (86 kg)	Fr	Our Saviour Lutheran	Brooklyn, NY
F	1	Josh Roberts	6 ft 9 in (2.06 m)	220 lb (100 kg)	Jr	Montverde Academy	Troy, AL
G/F	2	Julian Champagnie	6 ft 8 in (2.03 m)	220 lb (100 kg)	So	Bishop Loughlin	Brooklyn, NY
G	3	Rasheem Dunn	6 ft 2 in (1.88 m)	190 lb (86 kg)	RS Sr	Cleveland State	Brooklyn, NY
G	4	Greg Williams Jr.	6 ft 3 in (1.91 m)	200 lb (91 kg)	Jr	Lafayette Christian	Lafayette, LA
G	5	Dylan Addae-Wusu	6 ft 4 in (1.93 m)	235 lb (107 kg)	Fr	Our Saviour Lutheran	Bronx, NY
G/F	10	Marcellus Earlington	6 ft 6 in (1.98 m)	240 lb (109 kg)	Jr	Don Bosco Prep	Stony Point, NY
G	11	John McGriff	6 ft 0 in (1.83 m)	185 lb (84 kg)	RS Fr	Bishop McNamara	Bowie, MD
F	12	Arnaldo Toro	6 ft 8 in (2.03 m)	240 lb (109 kg)	GS	George Washington	Hormigueros, Puerto Rico
F	13	Isaih Moore	6 ft 10 in (2.08 m)	205 lb (93 kg)	Jr	Pearl River C.C.	Columbia, SC
G	14	Artemios Gavalas (W)	6 ft 1 in (1.85 m)	180 lb (82 kg)	Fr	Southampton	Southampton, NY
G/F	15	Vince Cole	6 ft 6 in (1.98 m)	185 lb (84 kg)	Jr	USC Salkehatchie	Charleston, SC
G/F	23	David Caraher (injured)	6 ft 6 in (1.98 m)	205 lb (93 kg)	RS Jr	Houston Baptist	Chapel Hill, NC
F	34	Jalen Rosemond (W)	6 ft 8 in (2.03 m)	230 lb (104 kg)	Jr	Sanford H. Calhoun	Merrick, NY

Head coach

- Mike Anderson (Tulsa)

Assistant coach(es)

- T.J. Cleveland (Arkansas)
- Van Macon (Southampton)
- Steve DeMeo (Buffalo)

Legend

- (C) Team captain
- (S) Suspended
- (I) Ineligible
- (W) Walk-on
- Injured
- Current redshirt

Roster

== Schedule and results ==
Date time, TV	Rank^{#}	Opponent^{#}	Result	Record	High points	High rebounds	High assists	Site (attendance) city, state
Regular season
November 25, 2020*; 7:00 pm, FS2		St. Peter's; The Lapchick Tournament	W 76–75	1–0	21 – Cole	9 – Moore	5 – Dunn	Carnesecca Arena (0); Queens, NY
November 26, 2020*; 2:00 pm, FS1		La Salle; The Lapchick Tournament	W 82–65	2–0	19 – Cole	7 – Moore	4 – Tied	Carnesecca Arena (0); Queens, NY
November 30, 2020*; 6:00 pm, ESPNU		vs. Boston College; Bubbleville	W 97–93	3–0	29 – Champagnie	10 – Champagnie	6 – Tied	Mohegan Sun Arena (0); Uncasville, CT
December 2, 2020*; 5:00 pm, ESPN2		vs. BYU; Legends Classic	L 68–74	3–1	25 – Champagnie	6 – Alexander	7 – Alexander	Mohegan Sun Arena (0); Uncasville, CT
December 3, 2020*; 9:00 pm, ESPN		at No. 17 Texas Tech; Big East/Big 12 Battle	Canceled due to the COVID-19 pandemic					United Supermarkets Arena; Lubbock, TX
December 6, 2020*; 12:00 pm, FS1		Sacred Heart	Canceled due to the COVID-19 pandemic					Carnesecca Arena; Queens, NY
December 6, 2020*; 2:30 pm, FS1		Stony Brook	W 89–66	4–1	21 – Williams Jr.	7 – Moore	4 – 4 Tied	Carnesecca Arena (0); Queens, NY
December 8, 2020*; 7:00 pm, CBSSN		Fordham; Rivalry	Canceled due to the COVID-19 pandemic					Carnesecca Arena; Queens, NY
December 8, 2020*; 7:00 pm, CBSSN		Rider	W 82–79	5–1	26 – Cole	10 – Champagnie	8 – Alexander	Carnesecca Arena (0); Queens, NY
December 11, 2020; 7:00 pm, FS1		at Connecticut	Postponed due to the COVID-19 pandemic; rescheduled for January 18					Gampel Pavilion; Storrs, CT
December 11, 2020; 4:30 pm, CBSSN		at Seton Hall	L 68–77	5–2 (0–1)	24 – Champagnie	6 – Champagnie	6 – Addae-Wusu	Prudential Center (0); Newark, NJ
December 13, 2020; 7:30 pm, FS1		at Georgetown; Rivalry	L 94–97 ^{OT}	5–3 (0–2)	26 – Moore	14 – Moore	6 – Tied	McDonough Gymnasium (0); Washington, DC
December 14, 2020; 5:00 pm, FS1		at Butler	Postponed due to the COVID-19 pandemic; rescheduled for February 9					Hinkle Fieldhouse; Indianapolis, IN
December 17, 2020; 7:00 pm, FS1		No. 9 Creighton	L 76–94	5–4 (0–3)	17 – Champagnie	5 – Champagnie	7 – Dunn	Carnesecca Arena (0); Queens, NY
December 20, 2020; 6:30 pm, FS1		Georgetown; Rivalry	W 94–83	6–4 (1–3)	26 – Williams Jr.	9 – Champagnie	4 – Champagnie	Carnesecca Arena (0); Queens, NY
December 30, 2020		at No. 4 Villanova	Postponed; rescheduled for February 23					Finneran Pavilion; Villanova, PA
January 2, 2021; 12:00 pm, FS1		DePaul	Postponed due to the COVID-19 pandemic; rescheduled for February 20					Carnesecca Arena; Queens, NY
January 6, 2021; 8:00 pm, CBSSN		at Xavier	L 61–69	6–5 (1–4)	17 – Dunn	9 – Tied	6 – Addae-Wusu	Cintas Center (300); Cincinnati, OH
January 9, 2021; 12:00 pm, FS1		at No. 7 Creighton	L 79–97	6–6 (1–5)	33 – Champagnie	10 – Champagnie	6 – Alexander	CHI Health Center (1,777); Omaha, NE
January 12, 2021; 7:00 pm, FS1		Butler	W 69–57	7–6 (2–5)	18 – Champagnie	6 – Cole	5 – Dunn	Carnesecca Arena (0); Queens, NY
January 16, 2021; 12:00 pm, FS1		Marquette	L 71–73	7–7 (2–6)	20 – Champagnie	5 – Cole	8 – Alexander	Carnesecca Arena (0); Queens, NY
January 18, 2021; 2:30 pm, FOX		at No. 23 Connecticut	W 74–70	8–7 (3–6)	18 – Alexander	6 – Champagnie	6 – Alexander	Gampel Pavilion (0); Storrs, CT
January 23, 2021*; 4:00 pm, FS1		Utah Valley	W 96–78	9–7	20 – Alexander	7 – Roberts	4 – Dunn	Carnesecca Arena (0); Queens, NY
January 27, 2021; 9:00 pm, FS1		at DePaul	W 81–68	10–7 (4–6)	18 – Cole	7 – Roberts	9 – Dunn	Wintrust Arena (0); Chicago, IL
January 31, 2021; 3:30 pm, FOX		Connecticut	Canceled due to the COVID-19 pandemic					Carnesecca Arena; Queens, NY
January 31, 2021; 3:30 pm, FOX		at Marquette	W 75–73	11–7 (5–6)	22 – Champagnie	7 – Champagnie	4 – Cole	Fiserv Forum (0); Milwaukee, WI
February 3, 2021; 9:00 pm, CBSSN		No. 3 Villanova	W 70–59	12–7 (6–6)	16 – Alexander	13 – Champagnie	6 – Alexander	Carnesecca Arena (0); Queens, NY
February 6, 2021; 2:00 pm, FS1		at Providence	W 92–81	13–7 (7–6)	24 – Champagnie	10 – Champagnie	10 – Dunn	Alumni Hall (0); Providence, RI
February 9, 2021; 9:00 pm, FS1		at Butler	L 73–76 ^{OT}	13–8 (7–7)	19 – Champagnie	8 – Champagnie	6 – Addae-Wusu	Hinkle Fieldhouse (1,416); Indianapolis, IN
February 16, 2021; 8:30 pm, FS1		Xavier	W 93–84	14–8 (8–7)	21 – Champagnie	9 – Earlington	9 – Alexander	Carnesecca Arena (0); Queens, NY
February 20, 2021; 7:30 pm, FS1		DePaul	L 83–88	14–9 (8–8)	29 – Champagnie	7 – Champagnie	5 – Tied	Carnesecca Arena (0); Queens, NY
February 23, 2021; 8:00 pm, CBSSN		at No. 8 Villanova	L 58–81	14–10 (8–9)	16 – Champagnie	7 – Champagnie	4 – Tied	Finneran Pavilion (0); Villanova, PA
March 3, 2021; 7:00 pm, CBSSN		Providence	W 81–67	15–10 (9–9)	21 – Dunn	10 – Champagnie	3 – Tied	Carnesecca Arena (0); Queens, NY
March 6, 2021; 7:00 pm, FS1		Seton Hall	W 81–71	16–10 (10–9)	22 – Champagnie	6 – Tied	5 – Tied	Carnesecca Arena (0); Queens, NY
Big East tournament
March 11, 2021; 3:00 p.m., FS1	(4)	vs. (5) Seton Hall; Quarterfinals	L 69–77 ^{OT}	16–11	16 – Champagnie	9 – Champagnie	3 – Dunn	Madison Square Garden; Manhattan, NY
*Non-conference game. ^{#}Rankings from AP Poll. (#) Tournament seedings in parentheses. All times are in Eastern Time.

== Rankings ==
Ranking movements Legend: RV = Received votes
	Week																				
Poll	Pre	1	2	3	4	5	6	7	8	9	10	11	12	13	14	15	16	17	18	19	Final
AP												RV									
Coaches																					

*No rankings released
