= 2020–21 Providence Friars men's basketball team =

American college basketball season

2020–21 Providence Friars men's basketball
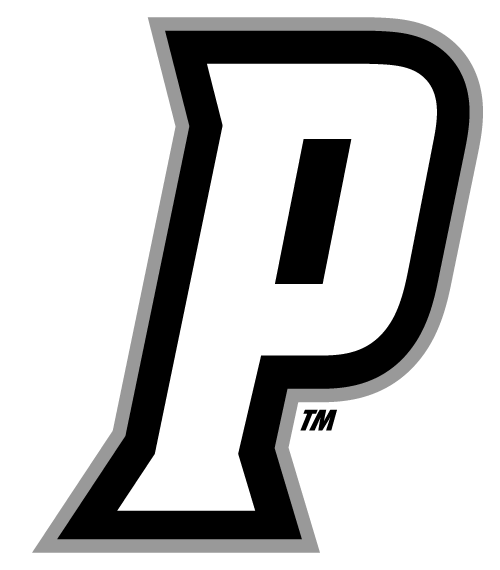
- Conference: Big East Conference
- Record: 13–13 (9–10 Big East)
- Head coach: Ed Cooley (10th season)
- Home arena: Alumni Hall

2020–21 Big East men's basketball standings
	Conf.				Overall
Team	W		L	PCT	W		L	PCT
No. 18 Villanova	11	–	4	.733	18	–	7	.720
No. 19 Creighton	14	–	6	.700	22	–	9	.710
UConn	11	–	6	.647	15	–	8	.652
St. John's	10	–	9	.526	16	–	11	.593
Seton Hall	10	–	9	.526	14	–	13	.519
Providence	9	–	10	.474	13	–	13	.500
Xavier	6	–	7	.462	13	–	8	.619
Georgetown †	7	–	9	.438	13	–	13	.500
Marquette	8	–	11	.421	13	–	14	.481
Butler	8	–	12	.400	10	–	15	.400
DePaul	2	–	13	.133	5	–	14	.263
† 2021 Big East tournament winner Rankings from AP poll

The 2020–21 Providence Friars men's basketball team represented Providence College during the 2020–21 NCAA Division I men's basketball season. The team was led by tenth-year head coach Ed Cooley, and played their home games at Alumni Hall in Providence, Rhode Island as a member of the Big East Conference. They finished the season 13-13, 9–10 in Big East Play to finish in 6th place. They lost in the first round of the Big East tournament to DePaul.

== Roster ==
2020–21 Providence Friars men's basketball team
Players
Coaches

Pos.	#	Name	Height	Weight	Year	Previous school	Hometown
C	0	Nate Watson	6 ft 10 in (2.08 m)	260 lb (118 kg)	Sr	Bishop O'Connell High School	Arlington, Virginia
F	1	Greg Gantt	6 ft 8 in (2.03 m)	220 lb (100 kg)	So	Trinity Christian School	Fayetteville, North Carolina
F	2	Kris Monroe	6 ft 8 in (2.03 m)	215 lb (98 kg)	Jr	St. David's School	Creedmoor, North Carolina
G	3	David Duke	6 ft 5 in (1.96 m)	205 lb (93 kg)	Jr	Cushing Academy	Providence, Rhode Island
G	4	Jared Bynum	5 ft 10 in (1.78 m)	180 lb (82 kg)	RS So	Georgetown Prep; Saint Joseph's	Largo, Maryland
F	5	Jimmy Nichols, Jr.	6 ft 8 in (2.03 m)	220 lb (100 kg)	Jr	Conway High School	Conway, South Carolina
G	10	Alyn Breed	6 ft 3 in (1.91 m)	180 lb (82 kg)	Fr	McEachern High School	Powder Springs, Georgia
G	11	A. J. Reeves	6 ft 6 in (1.98 m)	205 lb (93 kg)	Jr	Brimmer and May School	Roxbury, Massachusetts
G	12	Brycen Goodine	6 ft 4 in (1.93 m)	185 lb (84 kg)	So	St. Andrew's School; Syracuse	New Bedford, Massachusetts
F	13	Jyare Davis	6 ft 7 in (2.01 m)	215 lb (98 kg)	Fr	Sanford School	Newark, Delaware
F	14	Noah Horchler	6 ft 8 in (2.03 m)	220 lb (100 kg)	RS Sr	Melbourne High School; North Florida	Melbourne Beach, Florida
F	21	Ed Croswell	6 ft 8 in (2.03 m)	245 lb (111 kg)	Jr	St. Joseph's Prep; La Salle	Philadelphia, Pennsylvania
G	24	Andrew Fonts (W)	6 ft 2 in (1.88 m)	175 lb (79 kg)	Sr	Portsmouth Abbey School	Portsmouth, Rhode Island

Head coach

- Ed Cooley (Stonehill)

Assistant coach(es)

- Jeff Battle (Marshall)
- Brian Blaney (Roanoke)
- Ivan Thomas (VCU)

Legend

- (C) Team captain
- (S) Suspended
- (I) Ineligible
- (W) Walk-on
- Injured
- Current redshirt

Roster
Last update: 2019-11-01

== Schedule and results ==
Date time, TV	Rank^{#}	Opponent^{#}	Result	Record	High points	High rebounds	High assists	Site (attendance) city, state
Non-conference regular season
November 25, 2020*; 2:00 p.m., FS1		Fairfield	W 97–56	1–0	23 – Watson	10 – Watson	8 – Bynum	Alumni Hall; Providence, RI
November 30, 2020*; 2:30 p.m., ESPN2		vs. Indiana; Maui Invitational Quarterfinals	L 58–79	1–1	12 – Tied	9 – Horchler	3 – Duke	Harrah's Cherokee Center; Asheville, NC
December 1, 2020*; 7:00 p.m., ESPN2		vs. Davidson; Maui Invitational Second Consolation Round	W 63–62	2–1	22 – Watson	8 – Horchler	5 – Bynum	Harrah's Cherokee Center; Asheville, NC
December 2, 2020*; 7:00 p.m., ESPN2		vs. Alabama; Maui Invitational Fifth Place Game	L 71–88	2–2	19 – Duke	4 – Tied	6 – Duke	Harrah's Cherokee Center; Asheville, NC
December 5, 2020*; 4:30 p.m., FS2		Fairleigh Dickinson	W 79–67	3–2	28 – Duke	8 – Duke	5 – Gantt	Alumni Hall; Providence, RI
December 9, 2020*; 5:00 p.m., ESPNU		at TCU; Big East/Big 12 Battle	W 79–70	4–2	28 – Duke	8 – Tied	8 – Bynum	Schollmaier Arena; Fort Worth, TX
Big East regular season
December 12, 2020		Xavier	Postponed					Alumni Hall; Providence, RI
December 17, 2020		UConn	Postponed					Alumni Hall; Providence, RI
December 20, 2020; 4:30 p.m., FS1		at Seton Hall	W 80–77 ^{OT}	5–2 (1–0)	23 – Watson	11 – Watson	8 – Bynum	Prudential Center; Newark, NJ
December 23, 2020; 7:00 p.m., CBSSN		at Butler	L 64–70	5–3 (1–1)	19 – Watson	8 – Duke	5 – Duke	Hinkle Fieldhouse (1,724); Indianapolis, IN
December 27, 2020; 4:30 p.m., FS1		DePaul	W 95–90 ^{2OT}	6–3 (2–1)	24 – Duke	14 – Watson	6 – Duke	Alumni Hall; Providence, RI
December 30, 2020; 5:00 p.m., FS1		Butler	W 71–55	7–3 (3–1)	22 – Duke	13 – Duke	8 – Duke	Alumni Hall; Providence, RI
January 2, 2021; 12:00 p.m., FOX		No. 11 Creighton	L 65–67	7–4 (3–2)	13 – Tied	8 – Watson	4 – Duke	Alumni Hall; Providence, RI
January 10, 2021; 11:00 a.m., FOX		at Xavier	L 73–74	7–5 (3–3)	30 – Duke	14 – Watson	6 – Duke	Cintas Center (300); Cincinnati, OH
January 12, 2021; 9:00 p.m., FS1		at Marquette	L 69–79	7–6 (3–4)	18 – Watson	6 – Tied	9 – Duke	Fiserv Forum; Milwaukee, WI
January 16, 2021; 12:00 p.m., FS1		Georgetown	Postponed					Alumni Hall; Providence, RI
January 20, 2021; 9:00 p.m., FS1		at No. 11 Creighton	W 74–70	8–6 (4–4)	29 – Watson	8 – Reeves	5 – Duke	CHI Health Center Omaha (1,731); Omaha, NE
January 23, 2021; 2:30 p.m., FOX		at No. 3 Villanova	L 56–71	8–7 (4–5)	18 – Breed	11 – Tied	4 – Tied	Finneran Pavilion; Villanova, PA
January 27, 2021; 7:00 p.m., CBSSN		Marquette	W 72–63	9–7 (5–5)	31 – Duke	7 – Watson	6 – Duke	Alumni Hall; Providence, RI
January 30, 2021; 12:00 p.m., FS1		at Georgetown	L 72–73	9–8 (5–6)	28 – Reeves	7 – Horchler	7 – Duke	Capital One Arena; Washington, D.C.
February 3, 2021; 7:00 p.m., FS1		Seton Hall	L 43–60	9–9 (5–7)	10 – Tied	8 – Tied	6 – Duke	Alumni Hall; Providence, RI
February 6, 2021; 2:00 p.m., FS1		St. John's	L 81–92	9–10 (5–8)	30 – Watson	8 – Tied	7 – Duke	Alumni Hall; Providence, RI
February 10, 2021; 4:00 p.m., FS1		UConn	W 70–59	10–10 (6–8)	17 – Tied	10 – Horchler	6 – Reeves	Alumni Hall; Providence, RI
February 13, 2021; 8:00 p.m., FS1		at DePaul	W 57–47	11–10 (7–8)	17 – Duke	13 – Duke	4 – Duke	Wintrust Arena; Chicago, IL
February 16, 2021; 6:30 p.m., FS1		at UConn	L 61–73	11–11 (7–9)	14 – Breed	6 – Watson	2 – 3 Tied	Harry A. Gampel Pavilion; Storrs, CT
February 24, 2021; 9:00 p.m., FS1		Xavier	W 83–68	12–11 (8–9)	20 – Horchler	9 – Tied	9 – Duke	Alumni Hall; Providence, RI
March 3, 2021; 7:00 p.m., CBSSN		at St. John's	L 67–81	12–12 (8–10)	19 – Watson	9 – Duke	3 – Tied	Carnesecca Arena; Queens, NY
March 6, 2021; 2:30 p.m., FOX		Villanova	W 54–52	13–12 (9–10)	20 – Tied	13 – Horchler	3 – Duke	Alumni Hall; Providence, RI
Big East tournament
March 10, 2021; 9:00 p.m, FS1	(6)	vs. (11) DePaul; First round	L 62–70	13–13	18 – Watson	9 – Watson	4 – Duke	Madison Square Garden (–); New York, NY
*Non-conference game. ^{#}Rankings from AP Poll. (#) Tournament seedings in parentheses. All times are in Eastern Time.
