= 2020–21 UConn Huskies men's basketball team =

American college basketball season

2020–21 UConn Huskies men's basketball

NCAA tournament, first round
- Conference: Big East
- Record: 15–8 (11–6 Big East)
- Head coach: Dan Hurley (3rd season)
- Assistant coaches: Kimani Young; Tom Moore; Kevin Freeman
- Home arena: Harry A. Gampel Pavilion

2020–21 Big East men's basketball standings
	Conf.				Overall
Team	W		L	PCT	W		L	PCT
No. 18 Villanova	11	–	4	.733	18	–	7	.720
No. 19 Creighton	14	–	6	.700	22	–	9	.710
UConn	11	–	6	.647	15	–	8	.652
St. John's	10	–	9	.526	16	–	11	.593
Seton Hall	10	–	9	.526	14	–	13	.519
Providence	9	–	10	.474	13	–	13	.500
Xavier	6	–	7	.462	13	–	8	.619
Georgetown †	7	–	9	.438	13	–	13	.500
Marquette	8	–	11	.421	13	–	14	.481
Butler	8	–	12	.400	10	–	15	.400
DePaul	2	–	13	.133	5	–	14	.263
† 2021 Big East tournament winner Rankings from AP poll

The 2020–21 UConn Huskies men's basketball team represented the University of Connecticut in the 2020–21 NCAA Division I men's basketball season. The Huskies were led by third-year head coach Dan Hurley in their first season of the Big East Conference. Due to the COVID-19 pandemic, the Huskies played all of their home games this year at Harry A. Gampel Pavilion on the UConn campus in Storrs, Connecticut.

The Huskies returned to the new Big East for the 2020–21 season following seven years in the American Athletic Conference. They finished the season 15–8, 11–6, in Big East play to finish in 3rd place. The Huskies defeated DePaul in the quarterfinals of the Big East tournament before losing in the semifinals to Creighton. UConn received an at-large bid to the NCAA tournament, where they lost in the First Round to Maryland 63–54.

== Previous season ==
They finished the season 19–12, 10–8 in AAC play to finish in a tie for fifth place. Their season ended when the AAC Tournament and all other postseason tournaments were canceled due to the COVID-19 pandemic.

== Offseason ==
=== Departures ===
Name	Number	Pos.	Height	Weight	Year	Hometown	Notes
Christian Vital	1	G	6'2"	187lbs	Senior	Queens, NY	Graduated
Alterique Gilbert	3	G	6'0"	180lbs	RS Junior	Atlanta, GA	Transferred to Wichita State
Sidney Wilson	15	G/F	6'7"	180lbs	RS Sophomore	Bronx, NY	Transferred to SIU Edwardsville
Omotayo Aiyegbusi	45	G	6'4"	200lbs	Senior	Conshohocken, PA	Graduated

=== Incoming transfers ===
Name	Number	Pos.	Height	Weight	Year	Hometown	Notes
Tyrese Martin	4	G	6'6"	215	Junior	Allentown, PA	Transfer from Rhode Island. Under NCAA transfer rules, Cole received a waiver and will be eligible for the 2020–21 season. He will have two years of remaining eligibility.

=== 2020 recruiting class ===
College recruiting information
Name	Hometown	School	Height	Weight	Commit date
Andre Jackson Jr. G	Amsterdam, NY	Albany Academy	6 ft 6 in (1.98 m)	210 lb (95 kg)	Oct 2, 2019
Andre Jackson Jr. G	Recruit ratings: Rivals: 247Sports: ESPN: (88)				
Adama Sanogo; F	Bamako, Mali	The Patrick School	6 ft 9 in (2.06 m)	240 lb (110 kg)	May 5, 2020
Adama Sanogo; F	Recruit ratings: Rivals: 247Sports: ESPN: (85)				
Javonte Brown-Ferguson; C	Toronto, ON	Thornlea Secondary School	7 ft 0 in (2.13 m)	250 lb (110 kg)	Nov 13, 2019
Javonte Brown-Ferguson; C	Recruit ratings: Rivals: 247Sports: ESPN: (80)				
Overall recruit ranking: Rivals: 14 247Sports: 23 ESPN: 17
Note: In many cases, Scout, Rivals, 247Sports, On3, and ESPN may conflict in their listings of height and weight.; In these cases, the average was taken. ESPN grades are on a 100-point scale.; Sources: "2020 UConn Basketball Commitments". Rivals.; "2020 Team Ranking". Rivals.

== Roster ==
2020–21 UConn Huskies men's basketball team
Players
Coaches

Pos.	#	Name	Height	Weight	Year	Previous school	Hometown
G	0	Jalen Gaffney	6 ft 3 in (1.91 m)	185 lb (84 kg)	So	Westtown School	Columbus, NJ
G	1	R. J. Cole	6 ft 1 in (1.85 m)	185 lb (84 kg)	RS Jr	Howard	Union, NJ
G	2	James Bouknight	6 ft 5 in (1.96 m)	190 lb (86 kg)	So	The MacDuffie School	Brooklyn, NY
G	4	Tyrese Martin	6 ft 6 in (1.98 m)	215 lb (98 kg)	Jr	Rhode Island	Allentown, PA
F	5	Isaiah Whaley	6 ft 9 in (2.06 m)	230 lb (104 kg)	Sr	Mt. Zion Prep	Gastonia, NC
G	10	Brendan Adams	6 ft 4 in (1.93 m)	195 lb (88 kg)	Jr	Calvert Hall College	Baltimore, MD
F	11	Akok Akok	6 ft 9 in (2.06 m)	215 lb (98 kg)	RS So	Putnam Science Academy	Manchester, NH
F	12	Tyler Polley	6 ft 9 in (2.06 m)	215 lb (98 kg)	Sr	Sagemont	Miramar, FL
F	13	Richie Springs	6 ft 9 in (2.06 m)	225 lb (102 kg)	RS Fr	The MacDuffie School	Brooklyn, NY
G	20	Andrew Hurley (W)	6 ft 1 in (1.85 m)	175 lb (79 kg)	Fr	East Catholic	Glastonbury, CT
F	21	Adama Sanogo	6 ft 9 in (2.06 m)	240 lb (109 kg)	Fr	The Patrick School	Bamako, Mali
F/C	25	Josh Carlton	6 ft 11 in (2.11 m)	240 lb (109 kg)	Sr	DeMatha Catholic	Winterville, NC
C	31	Javonte Brown (I)	7 ft 0 in (2.13 m)	250 lb (113 kg)	Fr	Thornlea Secondary School	Toronto, ON
G	41	Matt Garry (injured) (W)	6 ft 5 in (1.96 m)	195 lb (88 kg)	Jr	St. Paul Catholic	Southington, CT
G	44	Andre Jackson Jr.	6 ft 6 in (1.98 m)	210 lb (95 kg)	Fr	Albany Academy	Amsterdam, NY

Head coach

- Dan Hurley (Seton Hall)

Assistant coach(es)

- Kimani Young (UTEP)
- Tom Moore (Boston University)
- Kevin Freeman (Connecticut)

Legend

- (C) Team captain
- (S) Suspended
- (I) Ineligible
- (W) Walk-on
- Injured
- Current redshirt

Roster
Last update: November 23, 2020

Javonte Brown was only on the roster for the fall semester and announced plans to transfer on January 8, 2021.

== Schedule and results ==
Date time, TV	Rank^{#}	Opponent^{#}	Result	Record	High points	High rebounds	High assists	Site (attendance) city, state
Non-conference regular season
November 25, 2020*; 8:00 pm, FS1		Central Connecticut	W 102–75	1–0	20 – Bouknight	8 – Bouknight	6 – Tied	Harry A. Gampel Pavilion (125); Storrs, CT
November 27, 2020*; 8:00 pm, CBSSN		Hartford	W 69–57	2–0	18 – Bouknight	10 – Tied	4 – Whaley	Harry A. Gampel Pavilion; Storrs, CT
December 1, 2020*; 5:00 pm, ESPN2		vs. Vanderbilt; Legends Classic	Cancelled due to the COVID-19 pandemic					Mohegan Sun Arena; Uncasville, CT
December 3, 2020*; 7:00 pm, ESPN		vs. USC; Legends Classic	W 61–58	3–0	18 – Bouknight	11 – Carlton	4 – Cole	Mohegan Sun Arena (0); Uncasville, CT
December 5, 2020*; 12:00 pm, ESPNU		vs. NC State; Bubbleville	Cancelled due to the COVID-19 pandemic					Mohegan Sun Arena; Uncasville, CT
Big East Conference regular season
December 20, 2020; 12:00 pm, FS1		No. 9 Creighton	L 74–76 ^{OT}	3–1 (0–1)	40 – Bouknight	10 – Martin	3 – Gaffney	Harry A. Gampel Pavilion; Storrs, CT
December 30, 2020; 9:00 pm, CBSSN		DePaul	W 82–61	4–1 (1–1)	22 – Martin	10 – Tied	6 – Cole	Harry A. Gampel Pavilion; Storrs, CT
January 5, 2021; 9:00 pm, FS1		at Marquette	W 65–54	5–1 (2–1)	23 – Polley	13 – Whaley	5 – Cole	Fiserv Forum; Milwaukee, WI
January 9, 2021; 4:00 pm, CBSSN		at Butler	W 72–60	6–1 (3–1)	19 – Polley	7 – Tied	3 – 3 tied	Hinkle Fieldhouse (1,879); Indianapolis, IN
January 11, 2021; 6:00 pm, FS1	No. 25	at DePaul	W 60–53	7–1 (4–1)	18 – Martin	5 – Tied	4 – Cole	Wintrust Arena; Chicago, IL
January 18, 2021; 2:30 pm, FOX	No. 23	St. John's	L 70–74	7–2 (4–2)	18 – Cole	8 – Whaley	5 – Cole	Harry A. Gampel Pavilion; Storrs, CT
January 20, 2021; 8:30 pm, CBSSN	No. 23	Xavier	Cancelled due to the COVID-19 pandemic					Harry A. Gampel Pavilion; Storrs, CT
January 23, 2021; 12:00 pm, FOX	No. 23	at No. 11 Creighton	L 66–74	7–3 (4–3)	14 – Cole	9 – Tied	5 – Cole	CHI Health Center Omaha (1,839); Omaha, NE
January 26, 2021; 8:30 pm, FS1		Butler	W 63–51	8–3 (5–3)	20 – Martin	6 – 3 tied	5 – Cole	Harry A. Gampel Pavilion; Storrs, CT
January 28, 2021; 9:00 pm, FS1		No. 3 Villanova	Cancelled due to the COVID-19 pandemic					Harry A. Gampel Pavilion; Storrs, CT
January 31, 2021; 3:30 pm, FOX		at St. John's	Cancelled due to the COVID-19 pandemic					Carnesecca Arena; Queens, NY
February 6, 2021; 12:00 pm, FOX		Seton Hall	L 73–80	8–4 (5–4)	20 – Gaffney	6 – Martin	2 – 3 tied	Harry A. Gampel Pavilion; Storrs, CT
February 10, 2021; 4:00 pm, FS1		at Providence	L 59–70	8–5 (5–5)	14 – Cole	9 – Martin	6 – Cole	Alumni Hall; Providence, RI
February 13, 2021; 12:00 pm, FOX		at Xavier	W 80–72	9–5 (6–5)	24 – Cole	10 – Whaley	7 – Cole	Cintas Center (922); Cincinnati, OH
February 16, 2021; 6:30 pm, FS1		Providence	W 73–61	10–5 (7–5)	18 – Tied	7 – Tied	5 – Cole	Harry A. Gampel Pavilion; Storrs, CT
February 20, 2021; 1:00 pm, FOX		at No. 10 Villanova	L 60–68	10–6 (7–6)	21 – Bouknight	11 – Martin	2 – Tied	Finneran Pavilion; Villanova, PA
February 23, 2021; 9:00 pm, FS1		at Georgetown; Rivalry	W 70–57	11–6 (8–6)	20 – Bouknight	10 – Bouknight	7 – Cole	McDonough Gymnasium; Washington, D.C.
February 27, 2021; 2:30 pm, FOX		Marquette	W 80–62	12–6 (9–6)	24 – Bouknight	8 – Tied	4 – Gaffney	Harry A. Gampel Pavilion; Storrs, CT
March 3, 2021; 6:30 pm, FS1		at Seton Hall	W 69–58	13–6 (10–6)	17 – Whaley	10 – Whaley	2 – Tied	Prudential Center (1,756); Newark, NJ
March 6, 2021; 12:00 pm, CBS		Georgetown; Rivalry	W 98–82	14–6 (11–6)	21 – Bouknight	10 – Sanogo	8 – Cole	Harry A. Gampel Pavilion; Storrs, CT
Big East tournament
March 11, 2021; 9:00 pm, FS1	(3)	vs. (11) DePaul; Quarterfinals	W 94–60	15–6	14 – 3 tied	10 – Martin	8 – Cole	Madison Square Garden (824); New York, NY
March 12, 2021; 9:00 pm, FS1	(3)	vs. (2) No. 17 Creighton; Semifinals	L 56–59	15–7	14 – Bouknight	8 – Bouknight	3 – Cole	Madison Square Garden (824); New York, NY
NCAA tournament
March 20, 2021; 7:10 pm, CBS	(7 E)	vs. (10 E) Maryland; First Round	L 54–63	15–8	15 – Bouknight	11 – Martin	4 – Whaley	Mackey Arena; West Lafayette, IN
*Non-conference game. ^{#}Rankings from AP Poll. (#) Tournament seedings in parentheses. All times are in Eastern Time.

== Rankings ==
Poll	Pre	Wk 2	Wk 3	Wk 4	Wk 5	Wk 6	Wk 7	Wk 8	Wk 9	Wk 10	Wk 11	Wk 12	Wk 13	Wk 14	Wk 15	Wk 16	Wk 17	Final
AP	RV	RV	RV	RV	NR	NR	RV	25	23	RV	RV	NR	NR	NR	RV	RV	RV	Not Released
Coaches	RV	-	RV	RV	RV	RV	RV	RV	RV	RV	NR	NR	NR	RV	RV	RV	RV	RV
