= 2021 Big East men's basketball tournament =

U.S. college basketball tournament

- Classification: Division I
- Season: 2020–21
- Teams: 11
- Site: Madison Square Garden; New York City
- Champions: Georgetown (8th title)
- Winning coach: Patrick Ewing (1st title)
- MVP: Dante Harris (Georgetown)
- Television: FS1, Fox

2020–21 Big East men's basketball standings
	Conf.				Overall
Team	W		L	PCT	W		L	PCT
No. 18 Villanova	11	–	4	.733	18	–	7	.720
No. 19 Creighton	14	–	6	.700	22	–	9	.710
UConn	11	–	6	.647	15	–	8	.652
St. John's	10	–	9	.526	16	–	11	.593
Seton Hall	10	–	9	.526	14	–	13	.519
Providence	9	–	10	.474	13	–	13	.500
Xavier	6	–	7	.462	13	–	8	.619
Georgetown †	7	–	9	.438	13	–	13	.500
Marquette	8	–	11	.421	13	–	14	.481
Butler	8	–	12	.400	10	–	15	.400
DePaul	2	–	13	.133	5	–	14	.263
† 2021 Big East tournament winner Rankings from AP poll

The 2021 Big East men's basketball tournament was a postseason men's basketball tournament for the Big East Conference. It was held from March 10 through March 13, 2021, at Madison Square Garden in New York City.

Georgetown received the conference's bid to the 2021 NCAA tournament.

== Seeds ==
All 11 Big East schools participated in the tournament. Teams were seeded by the conference record with tie-breaking procedures to determine the seeds for teams with identical conference records. The top five teams received first-round byes. Seeding for the tournament was determined at the close of the regular conference season.

Seed	School	Conference	Tiebreaker 1
1	Villanova	11–4	
2	Creighton	14–6	
3	UConn	11–6	
4	St. John's	10–9	1–1 vs. Villanova
5	Seton Hall	10–9	0–2 vs. Villanova
6	Providence	9–10	
7	Xavier	6–7	
8	Georgetown	7–9	
9	Marquette	8–11	
10	Butler	8–12	
11	DePaul	2–13	

== Schedule ==
Game	Time	Matchup	Score	Television	Attendance
First round – Wednesday, March 10
1	3:00 pm	No. 8 Georgetown vs. No. 9 Marquette	68–49	FS1	824
2	6:00 pm	No. 7 Xavier vs. No. 10 Butler	69–70^{OT}	FS1	824
3	9:00 pm	No. 6 Providence vs. No. 11 DePaul	62–70	FS1	824
Quarterfinals – Thursday, March 11
4	12:00 pm	No. 1 Villanova vs. No. 8 Georgetown	71–72	FS1	824
5	3:00 pm	No. 4 St. John's vs. No. 5 Seton Hall	69–77^{OT}	FS1	824
6	6:00 pm	No. 2 Creighton vs. No. 10 Butler	87–56	FS1	824
7	9:00 pm	No. 3 Connecticut vs. No. 11 DePaul	94–60	FS1	824
Semifinals – Friday, March 12
8	6:00 pm	No. 5 Seton Hall vs. No. 8 Georgetown	58–66	FS1	824
9	9:00 pm	No. 2 Creighton vs. No. 3 Connecticut	59–56	FS1	824
Championship – Saturday, March 13
10	6:30 pm	No. 8 Georgetown vs. No. 2 Creighton	73–48	FOX	824
Game times in Eastern Time. Rankings denote tournament seed. *Attendance is restricted to family and special guests due to the COVID-19 pandemic

== Bracket ==
First round Wednesday, March 10; FS1
8	Georgetown	68
9	Marquette	49
7	Xavier	69
10	Butler	70*
6	Providence	62
11	DePaul	70

Quarterfinals; Thursday, March 11; FS1
1	#14 Villanova	71
8	Georgetown	72
4	St. John's	69
5	Seton Hall	77*
2	#17 Creighton	87
10	Butler	56
3	UConn	94
11	DePaul	60

Semifinals; Friday, March 12; FS1
8	Georgetown	66
5	Seton Hall	58
2	#17 Creighton	59
3	UConn	56

Championship; Saturday, March 13; FOX
8	Georgetown	73
2	#17 Creighton	48

* denotes overtime period

== See also ==
- 2021 Big East women's basketball tournament
