= Posh Alexander =

American basketball player (born 2001)

Armex Děčín
- Position: Point guard
- League: NBL

Personal information
- Born: March 31, 2001 (age 25) Brooklyn, New York, U.S.
- Listed height: 6 ft 0 in (1.83 m)
- Listed weight: 205 lb (93 kg)

Career information
- High school: Our Saviour Lutheran School (The Bronx, New York)
- College: St. John's (2020–2023); Butler (2023–2024); Dayton (2024–2025)
- NBA draft: 2025: undrafted
- Playing career: 2025–present

Career history
- 2025–present: BK Děčín

Career highlights
- Big East co-Defensive Player of the Year (2021); Big East Freshman of the Year (2021); Big East All-Freshman Team (2021)

Posh Alexander (born March 31, 2001) is an American professional basketball player for BK Děčín of the Czech NBL. In college basketball, Alexander played for the Dayton Flyers of the Atlantic 10 Conference, the St. John's Red Storm, and Butler Bulldogs of the Big East Conference.

== High school career ==
Alexander attended Our Saviour Lutheran School in The Bronx, New York. He missed most of his junior season with a broken left arm. Alexander posted a league-record 60 points, eight assists and seven rebounds against Word of God Christian Academy. As a senior, he led his team to the Grind Session title game. Alexander competed for the New York Lightning on the Amateur Athletic Union circuit. He committed to playing college basketball for St. John's over offers from Dayton, Illinois, Pittsburgh and Seton Hall.

== College career ==
On February 3, 2021, Alexander recorded 16 points, six assists, four rebounds and three steals in a 70–59 upset win over third-ranked Villanova. In his next game, on February 6, he posted a freshman season-high 21 points and six assists in a 92–81 victory over Providence. Three days later, he earned USBWA National Freshman of the Week honors. At the end of the regular season, Alexander was named Big East Co-Defensive Player of the Year and Big East Freshman of the Year. He became the fourth player to win both awards, joining Allen Iverson, Alonzo Mourning and Patrick Ewing. He was a unanimous Big East All-Freshman Team selection. As a freshman, Alexander averaged 10.9 points, 4.3 assists, 3.4 rebounds and 2.6 steals per game. He led the Big East and all freshmen nationally in steals per game. Alexander was named Honorable Mention All-Big East as a sophomore. Alexander averaged 13.8 points, 5.5 assists, 4.4 rebounds, and 2.3 steals per game as a sophomore. In his junior season at St. John's, Alexander averaged 10.2 points, 4.2 assists, 3.9 rebounds, and 2 steals per game. After the season, he decided to stay in the Big East and transfer to Butler. On November 30, 2023, Alexander posted the first triple-double by a Bulldog player since Roosevelt Jones in 2016. He had 10 points, 10 rebounds, and 11 assists in a 103-95 overtime win over Texas Tech in the Big East-Big 12 Battle. On December 9, 2023, Alexander recorded a season-high 21 points in a 97-90 double overtime win over California. On January 16, 2024, Alexander tied a season-high with 21 points in an 85-71 loss at Xavier. In his senior season at Butler, Alexander averaged 11.3 points, 4.9 assists, 4.6 rebounds, and 2.2 steals per game. After Alexander's senior season at Butler, he decided to transfer to Dayton for his final season of collegiate eligibility. He averaged 5.8 points, 2.2 rebounds, and 2.2 assists per game.

== Professional career ==
On October 30, 2025, Alexander signed his first professional contract with BK Děčín for the 2025-2026 season.

== Personal life ==
In July 2024, Alexander and his girlfriend, Aniyah Soto, had a son.

== Career statistics ==
Legend
GP	Games played	GS	Games started	MPG	Minutes per game
FG%	Field goal percentage	3P%	3-point field goal percentage	FT%	Free throw percentage
RPG	Rebounds per game	APG	Assists per game	SPG	Steals per game
BPG	Blocks per game	PPG	Points per game	**Bold**	Career high

=== College ===
Year	Team	GP	GS	MPG	FG%	3P%	FT%	RPG	APG	SPG	BPG	PPG
2020–21	St. John's	25	24	31.0	.454	.299	.725	3.4	4.3	**2.6**	.0	10.9
2021–22	St. John's	29	25	31.9	**.498**	.217	.741	4.4	**5.5**	2.3	**.2**	**13.8**
2022–23	St. John's	30	28	**32.8**	.400	.232	.724	3.9	4.2	2.0	.1	10.2
2023-24	Butler	**32**	**32**	31.9	.432	**.333**	.781	**4.6**	4.9	2.2	.1	11.3
2024-25	Dayton	29	3	19.0	.376	.293	**.886**	2.2	2.2	1.1	.1	5.8
Career		145	112	29.3	.439	.279	.761	3.7	4.2	2.0	.1	10.4
