= High School for Environmental Studies =

Public school in New York City

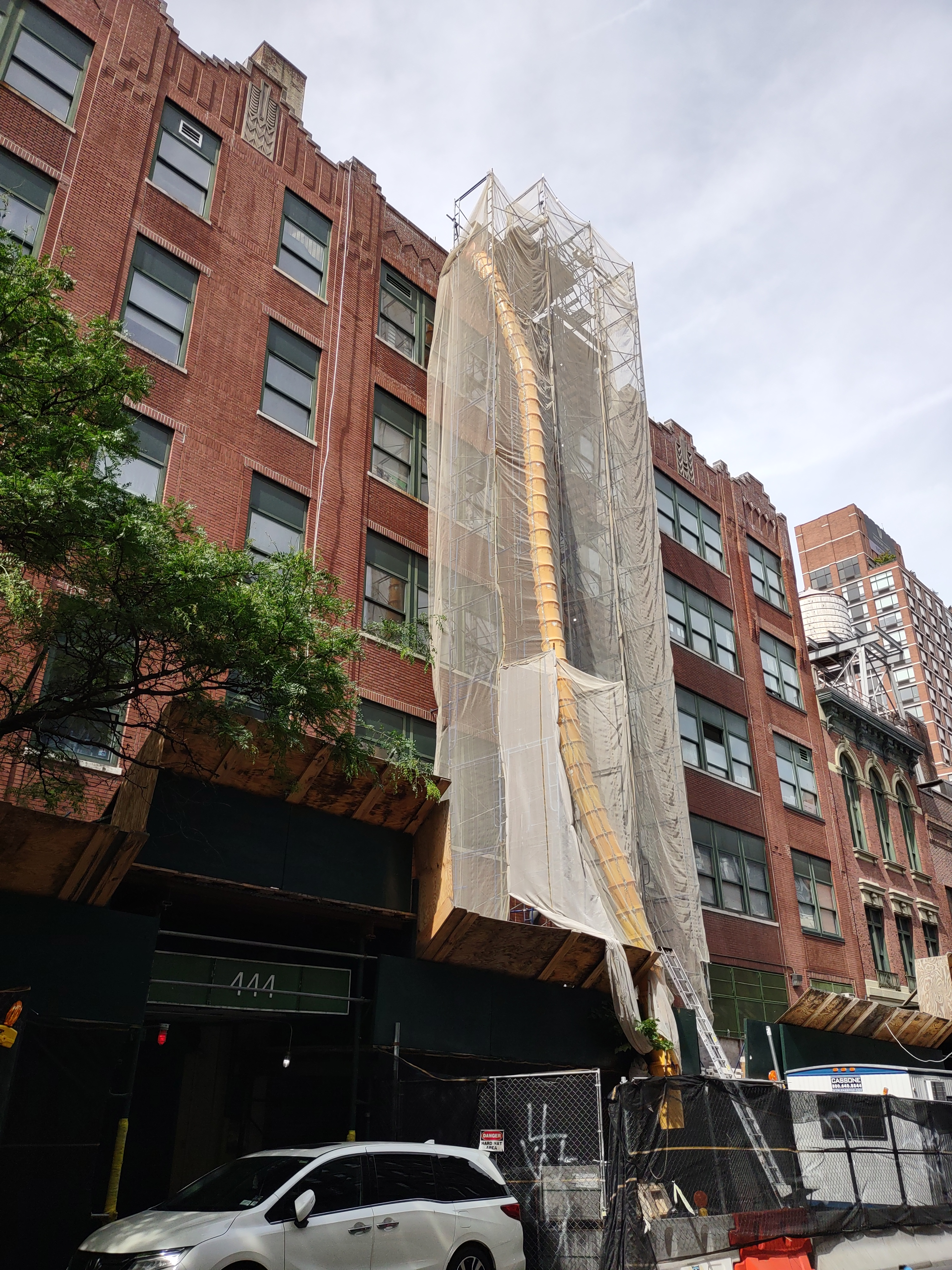
- 444 West 56th Street in 2024

Location
- 444 West 56th Street; New York City; 40.76789°N 73.98837°W

Information
- Type: Public school
- Established: 1992
- Grades: 9–12
- Enrollment: 1185
- Color: Green
- Mascot: Eagles
- Nickname: HSES
- Website: www.envirostudies.org

The High School for Environmental Studies (HSES) is located in the Hell's Kitchen (or Clinton) neighborhood of Manhattan in New York City. The school was once a Fox Film movie studio.

In 1992, the High School for Environmental Studies opened its doors in the building that formerly housed Stuyvesant High School in the East Village on East 15th Street and First Avenue in Manhattan. 150 freshmen students attended the school in its first year. HSES was established in response to a growing consciousness of environmental issues and in anticipation of a rapidly expanding field of environmental professions.
