= 2019–20 Big East Conference men's basketball season =

- League: NCAA Division I
- Sport: Basketball
- Teams: 10
- TV partner(s): CBS, CBSSN, FOX, FS1, FSN

Regular Season
- Season champions: Creighton, Seton Hall, Villanova
- Season MVP: Myles Powell, Seton Hall

Tournament

Basketball seasons
- ← 2018–19 2020–21 →

2019–20 Big East men's basketball standings
	Conf.				Overall
Team	W		L	PCT	W		L	PCT
No. 7 Creighton	13	–	5	.722	24	–	7	.774
No. 10 Villanova	13	–	5	.722	24	–	7	.774
No. 15 Seton Hall	13	–	5	.722	21	–	9	.700
Providence	12	–	6	.667	19	–	12	.613
No. 23 Butler	10	–	8	.556	22	–	9	.710
Marquette	8	–	10	.444	18	–	12	.600
Xavier	8	–	10	.444	19	–	13	.594
Georgetown	5	–	13	.278	15	–	17	.469
St. John's	5	–	13	.278	17	–	15	.531
DePaul	3	–	15	.167	16	–	16	.500
Note: The 2020 Big East tournament was cancelled at halftime of the first game of the quarterfinals due to the COVID-19 pandemic. Rankings from AP poll

The 2019–20 Big East Conference men's basketball season began with practices in October 2019, followed by the start of the 2019–20 NCAA Division I men's basketball season in November. Conference play began in January 2020.

== Head coaches ==
=== Coaching changes ===
In April 2019, Chris Mullin resigned as the head coach of St. John's, leaving the program after four seasons. On April 19, Arkansas head coach Mike Anderson was hired by St. John's as Mullin's replacement.

=== Coaches ===
Team	Head coach	Previous job	Years at school	Overall record	Big East record	Big East titles	NCAA Tournaments	NCAA Final Fours	NCAA Championships
Butler	LaVall Jordan	Milwaukee	3	50–32	17–20	0	1	0	0
Creighton	Greg McDermott	Iowa State	10	217–111	56–52	0	5	0	0
DePaul	Dave Leitao	Tulsa (asst.)	8	118–117	46–74	0	0	0	0
Georgetown	Patrick Ewing	Charlotte Hornets (asst.)	3	49–46	19–35	0	0	0	0
Marquette	Steve Wojciechowski	Duke (asst.)	6	107–72	43–48	0	2	0	0
Providence	Ed Cooley	Fairfield	9	170–116	72–73	1	5	0	0
Seton Hall	Kevin Willard	Iona	10	179–131	70–90	1	3	0	0
St. John's	Mike Anderson	Arkansas	1	11–3	0–0	0	0	0	0
Villanova	Jay Wright	Hofstra	19	457–177	203–105	7	14	3	2
Xavier	Travis Steele	Xavier (asst.)	2	29–18	9–9	0	0	0	0

Notes:

- Years at school includes 2019–20 season.
- Overall and Big East records are from time at current school and are through week nine of the 2019–20 season.
- McDermott's MVC conference records not included since team began play in the Big East.

== Preseason ==
=== Preseason poll ===
Prior to the season, the Big East conducted a poll of Big East coaches. Coaches do not place their own team on their ballots.

Rank	Team
1.	Seton Hall (5)
2.	Villanova (5)
3.	Xavier
T-4.	Marquette
T-4.	Providence
6.	Georgetown
7.	Creighton
8.	Butler
9.	St. John's
10.	DePaul
(first place votes)

=== Preseason All-Big East teams ===
Honor	Recipient
Preseason Player of the Year	Myles Powell, Seton Hall
Preseason Freshman of the Year	Jeremiah Robinson-Earl, Villanova
Preseason All-Big East First Team	Kamar Baldwin, Butler
Preseason All-Big East First Team	Ty-Shon Alexander, Creighton
Preseason All-Big East First Team	Markus Howard, Marquette
Preseason All-Big East First Team	Alpha Diallo, Providence
Preseason All-Big East First Team	Naji Marshall, Xavier
Preseason All-Big East Second Team	Paul Reed, DePaul
Preseason All-Big East Second Team	James Akinjo, Georgetown
Preseason All-Big East Second Team	L. J. Figueroa, St. John's
Preseason All-Big East Second Team	Mustapha Heron, St. John's
Preseason All-Big East Second Team	Collin Gillespie, Villanova
Preseason All-Big East Second Team	Jermaine Samuels, Villanova
Preseason All-Big East Honorable Mention	Ömer Yurtseven, Georgetown
Preseason All-Big East Honorable Mention	Paul Scruggs, Xavier

*Schedule Source:

== Regular season ==
=== Rankings ===
Legend
Increase in ranking
Decrease in ranking
Not ranked previous week
() First place votes

		Pre Oct 21	Wk 2 Nov 11	Wk 3 Nov 18	Wk 4 Nov 25	Wk 5 Dec 2	Wk 6 Dec 9	Wk 7 Dec 16	Wk 8 Dec 23	Wk 9 Dec 30	Wk 10 Jan 6	Wk 11 Jan 13	Wk 12 Jan 20	Wk 13 Jan 27	Wk 14 Feb 3	Wk 15 Feb 10	Wk 16 Feb 17	Wk 17 Feb 24	Wk 18 Mar 2	Wk 19 Mar 9	Final
Butler	AP			RV	RV	24	18	17	12	11	6	5	13	16	19	19	23	RV	RV	24	23
Butler	C		RV	RV	RV	24	19	16	11	10	6	5	12	17	19	20	23	RV	25	21	21
Creighton	AP	RV	RV						RV	RV	RV	25	RV	RV	21	23	15	10	11	7	7
Creighton	C	RV	RV	RV	RV		RV	RV	RV	RV	RV	RV	RV	RV	22	21	15	11	14	9	9
DePaul	AP					RV	RV	RV	RV	RV											
DePaul	C				RV	RV	RV	RV	RV	RV											
Georgetown	AP	RV	RV		RV		RV	RV	RV	RV											
Georgetown	C	RV																			
Marquette	AP	RV	RV	RV			RV	RV	RV	RV	RV		RV		RV	18	19	RV	RV		
Marquette	C	RV	RV	RV			RV	RV	RV	RV	RV	RV	RV	RV	RV	22	19	RV	RV		
Providence	AP	RV	RV	RV															RV	RV	RV
Providence	C	RV																	RV	RV	RV
Seton Hall	AP	12	12	13	13	16	22	RV	RV	RV	RV	18	10	10	12	10	16	13	8	16	15
Seton Hall	C	13	13	13	13	15	22	RV	RV	RV	25	18	10	9	13	10	14	13	7	15	15
St. John's	AP									RV											
St. John's	C																				
Villanova	AP	10	10	17	22	23	20	18	10	10	16	14	9	8	12	15	12	12	14	11	10
Villanova	C	10	15	15	21	22	20	14	9	9	16	15	11	8	12	16	13	12	12	8	9
Xavier	AP	19	21	18	25	RV	23	RV	RV	RV	RV										
Xavier	C	21	21	21	23	RV	RV	RV	RV	RV	RV	RV									

=== Conference matrix ===
This table summarizes the head-to-head results between teams in conference play.

	Butler	Creighton	DePaul	Georgetown	Marquette	Providence	Seton Hall	St. John's	Villanova	Xavier
vs. Butler	–	1–1	1–1	1–1	1–1	1–1	2–0	0–1	1–1	0–2
vs. Creighton	1–1	–	0–2	1–1	0–2	1–1	0–1	1–1	1–1	0–2
vs. DePaul	1–1	2–0	–	1–1	1–1	1–0	2–0	2–0	2–0	2–0
vs. Georgetown	1–1	1–1	1–1	–	2–0	2–0	2–0	0–2	1–0	2–0
vs. Marquette	1–1	2–0	1–1	0–2	–	2–0	2–0	0–1	1–1	0–2
vs. Providence	1–1	1–1	0–1	0–2	0–2	–	1–1	1–1	1–1	1–1
vs. Seton Hall	0–2	1–0	0–2	0–2	0–2	1–1	–	0–2	1–1	1–1
vs. St. John's	2–0	1–1	0–2	2–0	1–0	1–1	2–0	–	2–0	2–0
vs. Villanova	1–1	1–1	0–2	0–1	1–1	1–1	1–1	0–2	–	0–2
vs. Xavier	1–0	2–0	0–2	0–2	2–0	1–1	1–1	0–2	2–0	–
Total	9-8	12-5	3-14	5-12	8-9	11-6	13-4	4-13	12-5	8-10

=== Player of the week ===
Throughout the season, the Big East Conference named a player of the week and a freshman of the week each Monday.

Week	Player of the week	Freshman of the week
November 11, 2019	Markus Howard, Marquette	Jeremiah Robinson-Earl, Villanova
November 18, 2019	Myles Powell, Seton Hall	Romeo Weems, DePaul
November 25, 2019	Collin Gillespie, Villanova	Romeo Weems (2), DePaul
December 2, 2019	Markus Howard (2), Marquette	Justin Moore, Villanova
December 9, 2019	Mac McClung, Georgetown	Justin Moore (2), Villanova
December 16, 2019	Mac McClung (2), Georgetown	Justin Moore (3), Villanova
December 23, 2019	Markus Howard (3), Marquette	Zach Freemantle, Xavier
January 6, 2020	Myles Powell (2), Seton Hall	Justin Moore (4), Villanova
January 13, 2020	Myles Powell (3), Seton Hall	Jeremiah Robinson-Earl (2), Villanova
January 20, 2020	Markus Howard (4), Marquette	Jeremiah Robinson-Earl (3), Villanova
January 27, 2020	Kamar Baldwin, Butler	Jeremiah Robinson-Earl (4), Villanova
February 3, 2020	Tyrique Jones, Xavier	Jeremiah Robinson-Earl (5), Villanova
February 10, 2020	Myles Powell (4), Seton Hall	KyKy Tandy, Xavier
February 17, 2020	Alpha Diallo, Providence	Jeremiah Robinson-Earl (6), Villanova
February 24, 2020	Marcus Zegarowski, Creighton	Justin Moore (5), Villanova
March 2, 2020	Markus Howard (5), Marquette	Julian Champagnie, St. John's
March 8, 2020	Kamar Baldwin (2), Butler	Julian Champagnie (2), St. John's

== Honors and awards ==
=== Big East Awards ===
2020 Big East Men's Basketball Individual Awards
Award	Recipient(s)
Player of the Year	Myles Powell, G., Seton Hall
Coach of the Year	Greg McDermott, Creighton
Defensive Player of the Year	Romaro Gill, C., Seton Hall
Freshman of the Year	Jeremiah Robinson-Earl, F., Villanova
Most Improved Player of the Year	Romaro Gill, C., Seton Hall
Scholar-Athlete of the Year	Kamar Baldwin, G., Butler
Sixth Man Award	Denzel Mahoney, G., Creighton
Sportsmanship Award	Kamar Baldwin, G., Butler; Jagan Mosely, G., Georgetown; Emmitt Holt, F., Providence

2020 Big East Men's Basketball All-Conference Teams
First Team	Second Team	Honorable Mention	All-Freshman Team
Markus Howard* – Marquette; Myles Powell* – Seton Hall; Saddiq Bey* – Villanova; Kamar Baldwin – Butler; Ty-Shon Alexander – Creighton; Naji Marshall – Xavier	Marcus Zegarowski* – Creighton; Paul Reed – DePaul; Collin Gillespie – Villanova; Alpha Diallo – Providence; Tyrique Jones – Xavier	Ömer Yurtseven - Georgetown; Quincy McKnight - Seton Hall	Jeremiah Robinson-Earl* – Villanova; Justin Moore* – Villanova; Romeo Weems – DePaul; Julian Champagnie – St. John's; Zach Freemantle – Xavier; KyKy Tandy – Xavier
* - denotes unanimous selection † - Due to a tie in the voting, an additional position was added
