= Yor Anei =

American professional basketball player

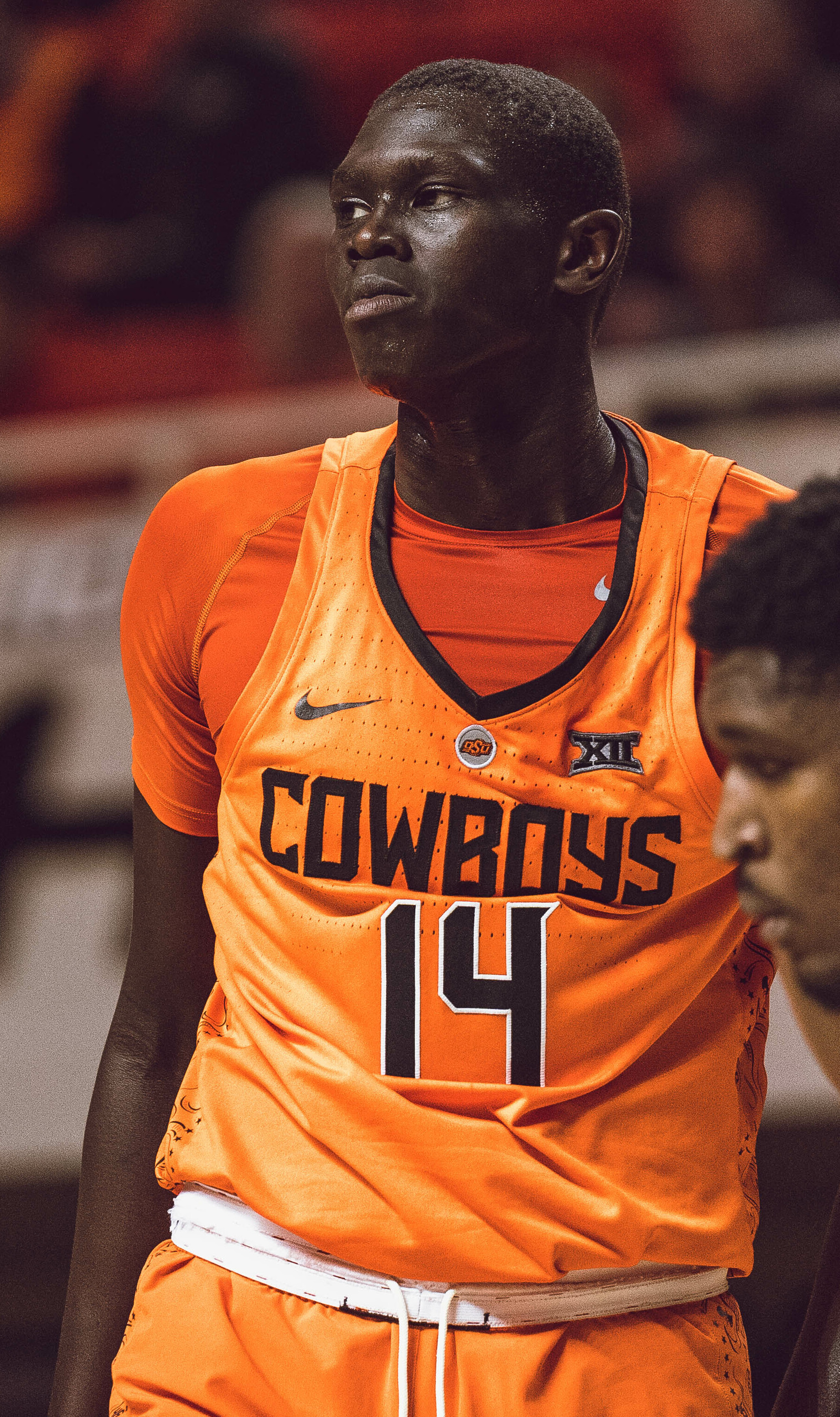
- Anei with Oklahoma State in 2019

No. 00 – KB Vëllaznimi
- Position: Power forward
- League: Kosovo Basketball Superleague

Personal information
- Born: December 7, 1999 (age 26) Overland Park, Kansas, U.S.
- Listed height: 6 ft 10 in (2.08 m)
- Listed weight: 220 lb (100 kg)

Career information
- High school: Shawnee Mission South (Overland Park, Kansas); Lee's Summit West (Lee's Summit, Missouri)
- College: Oklahoma State (2018–2020); SMU (2020–2021); DePaul (2021–2023)
- NBA draft: 2023: undrafted
- Playing career: 2023–present

Career history
- 2023: Motor City Cruise
- 2024: Raptors 905
- 2024: Westchester Knicks
- 2024: Wisconsin Herd
- 2025: Indiana Mad Ants
- 2025: Windy City Bulls
- 2025–present: Vëllaznimi

Yor Anei (born December 7, 1999) is an American professional basketball player for Vëllaznimi of the Kosovo Basketball Superleague. He played college basketball for the Oklahoma State Cowboys, the SMU Mustangs and the DePaul Blue Demons.

== High school career ==
Anei started off his high school career at Shawnee Mission South in Overland Park. He was a standout in his junior year and caught the eye of many recruiters. In his senior year, he joined Lee's Summit West where he was vital in helping the Titans earn a 22–5 record along with a Missouri Suburban Gold Conference championship. At the end of the season Anei was selected to the 2018 Missouri vs Kansas All-Star game where he would help Missouri to win 114–92, in the game he grabbed 15 points and 4 assists. Anei was named the number 1 player in Kansas regardless of position and the number 56 power forward in the country.

Anei played AAU Basketball for Team Rush in Kansas City. Team Rush was coached by former Oklahoma State Cowboy, Victor Williams.

== Recruiting ==
Anei received attention from multiple schools, such as Oklahoma State, UAB, and Denver.

College recruiting
| Name | Hometown | School | Height | Weight | Commit date |
|---|---|---|---|---|---|
| Yor Anei; PF | Lenexa, KS | Lee's Summit West High School (MO) | 6 ft 9 in (2.06 m) | 205 lb (93 kg) | Oct 26, 2017 |
| Yor Anei; PF | Recruit ratings: Scout: Rivals: 247Sports: ESPN: | | | | |
Overall recruit ranking:
Note: In many cases, Scout, Rivals, 247Sports, On3, and ESPN may conflict in their listings of height and weight.; In these cases, the average was taken. ESPN grades are on a 100-point scale.; Sources: "2018 Team Ranking". Rivals.

== College career ==
=== Oklahoma State ===
As a freshman at Oklahoma State Anei averaged 7.7 points and 5 rebounds, along with being an elite blocker on the national stage. He tied for 8th in the NCAA for blocks and 2nd in Freshman. He also tied Andre Williams' Oklahoma State school block record of 85. He had his first career double-double against TCU with 17 points and 10 rebounds, in that game he also had 7 blocks, which was only one away from the Big 12 record. In his sophomore season, Anei averaged 8.1 points, 4.6 rebounds and 1.9 blocks per game. Anei also recorded 13 double-digit scoring performances, in which Oklahoma State was 13–0 in those games. He had 8 blocks against Oral Roberts which was the most by any Big 12 player.

=== SMU ===
On July 15, 2020, Anei announced his transfer to SMU following OSU's one-year postseason ban from the NCAA. In his Junior season, and his first with SMU, he averaged 6.6 points, 2.2 rebounds, and 2.2 blocked shots. He led the American Athletic Conference in blocked shots. He had 12 points and 4 blocks in a win against UCF and 15 points along with 5 blocks in a win against Temple.

=== DePaul ===
On August 11, 2021, DePaul head coach Tony Stubblefield announced Anei's transfer to their program. In his senior season with DePaul, Anei averaged 4.6 points and 4.1 rebounds. Anei also recorded 49 blocks on the season. Anei ranked top among blocks in the Big East, Anei joined with Nick Ongenda as the first duo to reach 40 blocks in program history.

== Career statistics ==
Legend
| GP | Games played | GS | Games started | MPG | Minutes per game |
| FG% | Field goal percentage | 3P% | 3-point field goal percentage | FT% | Free throw percentage |
| RPG | Rebounds per game | APG | Assists per game | SPG | Steals per game |
| BPG | Blocks per game | PPG | Points per game | **Bold** | Career high |

=== College ===
| Year | Team | GP | GS | MPG | FG% | 3P% | FT% | RPG | APG | SPG | BPG | PPG |
|---|---|---|---|---|---|---|---|---|---|---|---|---|
| 2018–19 | Oklahoma State | **32** | **29** | **23.5** | **.616** | .000 | .641 | **4.8** | .7 | .3 | **2.7** | 7.7 |
| 2019–20 | Oklahoma State | **32** | 26 | 20.3 | .484 | **.333** | .704 | 4.7 | .5 | .6 | 1.9 | **8.1** |
| 2020–21 | SMU | 11 | 1 | 17.4 | .587 | .143 | **.750** | 2.2 | .3 | .5 | 2.2 | 6.6 |
| 2021–22 | DePaul | 30 | 4 | 15.4 | .550 | .000 | .707 | 4.1 | .4 | .6 | 1.6 | 4.6 |
| 2022–23 | DePaul | 18 | 16 | 18.0 | .433 | .000 | .640 | 3.8 | **.9** | **.8** | 1.3 | 5.2 |
| Career | | 123 | 76 | 19.3 | .532 | .083 | .685 | 4.2 | .6 | .5 | 2.0 | 6.6 |

Stats are updated as of March 4, 2023.

== Professional career ==
=== Motor City Cruise (2023) ===
After going undrafted in the 2023 NBA draft, Anei joined the Wisconsin Herd on October 30, 2023, but was waived on November 11. On December 13, he joined the Motor City Cruise, but was waived four days later.

=== Raptors 905 (2024) ===
On February 10, 2024, Anei joined Raptors 905, but was waived on February 20.

=== Westchester Knicks (2024) ===
On February 22, 2024, Anei joined the Westchester Knicks, but was waived on March 2.

=== Wisconsin Herd (2024) ===
On March 8, 2024, Anei joined the Wisconsin Herd.

On September 25, 2024, Anei signed with House of Talent Spurs of the BNXT League, but never played for them. On October 28, he re-joined the Herd. However, he was waived on December 28.

== Personal life ==
Anei's mother, Kathleen Akot was a South Sudanese refugee when she fled to the United States to leave the war-torn South Sudan. She moved to Overland Park, where she then gave birth to Anei. His mother had to work long and late shifts to support her and Anei. So in 2017, Anei was legally adopted by the parents of his high school teammate, Christian Bishop. The Bishops were able to help Anei achieve his academic and athletic goals and supported him for his senior year.

Anei lost his right index and middle fingers in a blender accident as a young kid.
