= 2022–23 Big East Conference men's basketball season =

- League: NCAA Division I
- Sport: Basketball
- Teams: 11
- TV partner(s): CBS, CBSSN, FOX, FS1

Regular Season
- Season champions: Marquette
- Season MVP: Tyler Kolek

Tournament
- Champions: Marquette
- Runners-up: Xavier

Basketball seasons
- ← 2021–22 2023–24 →

2022–23 Big East men's basketball standings
	Conf.				Overall
Team	W		L	PCT	W		L	PCT
No. 6 Marquette †	17	–	3	.850	29	–	7	.806
No. 13 Xavier	15	–	5	.750	27	–	10	.730
Creighton	14	–	6	.700	24	–	13	.649
No. 10 UConn	13	–	7	.650	31	–	8	.795
Providence	13	–	7	.650	21	–	12	.636
Villanova	10	–	10	.500	17	–	17	.500
Seton Hall	10	–	10	.500	17	–	16	.515
St. John's	7	–	13	.350	18	–	15	.545
Butler	6	–	14	.300	14	–	18	.438
DePaul	3	–	17	.150	10	–	23	.303
Georgetown	2	–	18	.100	7	–	25	.219
† 2023 Big East tournament winner Rankings from AP poll

The 2022–23 Big East Conference men's basketball season began with practices in October 2022, followed by the start of the 2022–23 NCAA Division I men's basketball season in November. Conference play began in December 2022 and ended in March. The conference champions were the Marquette Golden Eagles and the season MVP was Tyler Kolek.
