= 2022–23 Providence Friars men's basketball team =

American college basketball season

2022–23 Providence Friars men's basketball
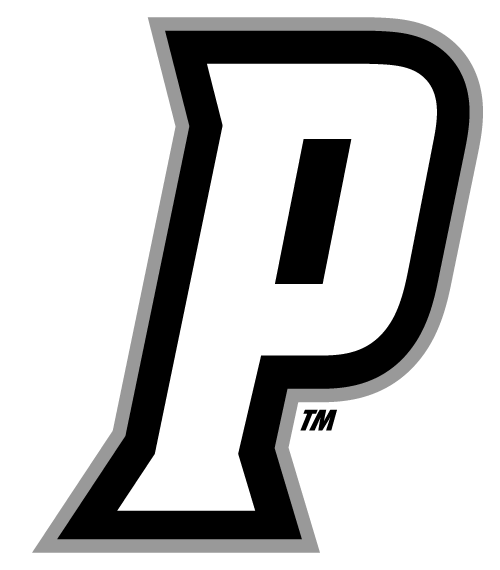

NCAA tournament, First Round
- Conference: Big East Conference
- Record: 21–12 (13–7 Big East)
- Head coach: Ed Cooley (12th season)
- Associate head coach: Jeff Battle (8th season)
- Assistant coaches: Brian Blaney (12th season); Ivan Thomas (8th season)
- Home arena: Amica Mutual Pavilion

2022–23 Big East men's basketball standings
	Conf.				Overall
Team	W		L	PCT	W		L	PCT
No. 6 Marquette †	17	–	3	.850	29	–	7	.806
No. 13 Xavier	15	–	5	.750	27	–	10	.730
Creighton	14	–	6	.700	24	–	13	.649
No. 10 UConn	13	–	7	.650	31	–	8	.795
Providence	13	–	7	.650	21	–	12	.636
Villanova	10	–	10	.500	17	–	17	.500
Seton Hall	10	–	10	.500	17	–	16	.515
St. John's	7	–	13	.350	18	–	15	.545
Butler	6	–	14	.300	14	–	18	.438
DePaul	3	–	17	.150	10	–	23	.303
Georgetown	2	–	18	.100	7	–	25	.219
† 2023 Big East tournament winner Rankings from AP poll

The 2022–23 Providence Friars men's basketball team represented Providence College during the 2022–23 NCAA Division I men's basketball season. The team was led by 12th-year head coach Ed Cooley, and played their home games at Amica Mutual Pavilion in Providence, Rhode Island as a member of the Big East Conference. They finished the season 21–12, 13–7 in Big East play to finish in a tie for fourth place. They lost in the quarterfinals of the Big East tournament to UConn. They received an at-large bid to the NCAA tournament as the No. 11 seed in the East region. There they lost to Kentucky in the first round.

On March 10, 2023, Ed Cooley left the school to take the head coach job at Georgetown. On March 23, the school named George Mason head coach Kim English the team's new head coach.

== Previous season ==
The Friars finished the 2021–22 season 27–6, 14–3 in Big East play to win the school's first regular season championship. The Friars defeated Butler in the quarterfinals of the Big East tournament before losing to Creighton in the semifinals. They received an at-large bid to the NCAA tournament as the No. 4 seed in the Midwest region. They defeated South Dakota State and Richmond to advance to the Sweet Sixteen. There they lost to No. 1 seed Kansas.

== Offseason ==
=== Departures ===
Name	Number	Pos.	Height	Weight	Year	Hometown	Reason for departure
Nate Watson	00	C	6'10"	260	GS Senior	Portsmouth, VA	Graduated
Al Durham	1	G	6'4"	180	GS Senior	Lilburn, GA	Graduated
Matteus Case	3	G	6'5"	190	Freshman	Pickering, ON	Transferred to William & Mary
A. J. Reeves	11	G	6'6"	205	Senior	Roxbury, MA	Graduated/undrafted in 2022 NBA draft
Brycen Goodine	12	G	6'4"	190	Junior	New Bedford, MA	Transferred to Fairfield
Noah Horchler	14	F	6'8"	220	GS Senior	Melbourne Beach, FL	Graduated
Justin Minaya	15	F	6'7"	210	GS Senior	Harrington Park, NJ	Graduated
Legend Geeter	23	F	6'8"	235	Freshman	River Rouge, MI	Transferred to Eastern Michigan
Andrew Fonts	24	G	6'2"	175	GS Senior	Portsmouth, RI	Walk-on; graduated

=== Incoming transfers ===
Name	Number	Pos.	Height	Weight	Year	Hometown	Previous school
Noah Locke	10	G	6'3"	205	GS Senior	Baltimore, MD	Louisville
Corey Floyd Jr.	14	G	6'3"	210	RS Freshman	Franklin, NJ	UConn
Clifton Moore	21	F/C	6'10"	240	GS Senior	Horsham, PA	La Salle
Devin Carter	22	G	6'3"	188	Sophomore	Miami, FL	South Carolina
Bryce Hopkins	23	F	6'7"	220	Sophomore	Oak Park, IL	Kentucky

=== Recruiting classes ===
==== 2022 recruiting class ====
College recruiting
Name	Hometown	School	Height	Weight	Commit date
Quant'e Berry #40 SG	Cleveland, TN	Winston-Salem Prep	6 ft 5 in (1.96 m)	170 lb (77 kg)	Jul 5, 2021
Quant'e Berry #40 SG	Recruit ratings: Scout: Rivals: 247Sports: ESPN: (80)				
Jayden Pierre #39 PG	Brookville, NY	Long Island Lutheran High School	6 ft 2 in (1.88 m)	165 lb (75 kg)	Sep 26, 2021
Jayden Pierre #39 PG	Recruit ratings: Scout: Rivals: 247Sports: ESPN: (80)				
Overall recruit ranking:
Note: In many cases, Scout, Rivals, 247Sports, On3, and ESPN may conflict in their listings of height and weight.; In these cases, the average was taken. ESPN grades are on a 100-point scale.; Sources: "2022 Team Ranking". Rivals.

==== 2023 recruiting class ====
College recruiting (2023)
Name	Hometown	School	Height	Weight	Commit date
Garwey Dual #11 SG	Carmel, IN	Southern California Academy	6 ft 5 in (1.96 m)	180 lb (82 kg)	Jun 20, 2022
Garwey Dual #11 SG	Recruit ratings: Scout: Rivals: 247Sports: ESPN: (83)				
Drew Fielder #20 C	Boise, ID	Southern California Academy	6 ft 10 in (2.08 m)	220 lb (100 kg)	Sep 19, 2022
Drew Fielder #20 C	Recruit ratings: Scout: Rivals: 247Sports: ESPN: (82)				
Overall recruit ranking:
Note: In many cases, Scout, Rivals, 247Sports, On3, and ESPN may conflict in their listings of height and weight.; In these cases, the average was taken. ESPN grades are on a 100-point scale.; Sources: "2023 Team Ranking". Rivals.

== Roster ==
2022–23 Providence Friars men's basketball team
Players
Coaches

Pos.	#	Name	Height	Weight	Year	Previous school	Hometown
G	0	Alyn Breed	6 ft 3 in (1.91 m)	190 lb (86 kg)	Jr	McEachern High School	Powder Springs, Georgia
G	1	Jayden Pierre	6 ft 2 in (1.88 m)	170 lb (77 kg)	Fr	Long Island Lutheran High School	Elizabeth, New Jersey
G	3	Quante Berry	6 ft 4 in (1.93 m)	175 lb (79 kg)	Fr	Winston Salem Christian School	Cleveland, Tennessee
G	4	Jared Bynum	5 ft 10 in (1.78 m)	180 lb (82 kg)	RS Sr	Georgetown Prep; Saint Joseph's	Largo, Maryland
F	5	Ed Croswell	6 ft 8 in (2.03 m)	240 lb (109 kg)	RS Sr	St. Joseph's Prep; La Salle	Philadelphia, Pennsylvania
G	10	Noah Locke	6 ft 3 in (1.91 m)	205 lb (93 kg)	GS	McDonogh School; Louisville	Baltimore, Maryland
F	13	Scott Morozov (W)	6 ft 6 in (1.98 m)	225 lb (102 kg)	Fr	Hoosac School	Toronto, Ontario
G	14	Corey Floyd Jr.	6 ft 3 in (1.91 m)	210 lb (95 kg)	RS Fr	Roselle Catholic High School; UConn	Franklin, New Jersey
F	21	Clifton Moore	6 ft 10 in (2.08 m)	240 lb (109 kg)	GS	Hatboro-Horsham Sr. High School; La Salle	Horsham, Pennsylvania
G	22	Devin Carter	6 ft 3 in (1.91 m)	195 lb (88 kg)	So	Brewster Academy; South Carolina	Miami, Florida
F	23	Bryce Hopkins	6 ft 6 in (1.98 m)	220 lb (100 kg)	So	Fenwick High School; Kentucky	Oak Park, Illinois
G	24	Luke Fonts (W)	6 ft 1 in (1.85 m)	190 lb (86 kg)	So	Portsmouth Abbey School	Portsmouth, Rhode Island
F	30	Rafael Castro	6 ft 10 in (2.08 m)	220 lb (100 kg)	RS Fr	Dover High School	Dover, New Jersey
F	33	Kieran O'Haire (W)	6 ft 2 in (1.88 m)	190 lb (86 kg)	So	The Albany Academy	Menands, New York

Head coach

- Ed Cooley (Stonehill)

Assistant coach(es)

- Jeff Battle (Marshall)
- Brian Blaney (Roanoke)
- Ivan Thomas (VCU)

Legend

- (C) Team captain
- (S) Suspended
- (I) Ineligible
- (W) Walk-on
- Injured
- Current redshirt

Roster

== Schedule and results ==
Date time, TV	Rank^{#}	Opponent^{#}	Result	Record	High points	High rebounds	High assists	Site (attendance) city, state
Exhibition
October 20, 2022*; 7:00 p.m.		American International	W 99–57		18 – Castro	8 – Castro	4 – Bynum	Amica Mutual Pavilion (3,583); Providence, RI
October 29, 2022*; 4:00 p.m.		Assumption	W 106–69		18 – Croswell	8 – Tied	5 – Bynum	Amica Mutual Pavilion (3,656); Providence, RI
Non-conference regular season
November 8, 2022*; 6:30 p.m., FS1		Rider	W 66–65	1–0	18 – Hopkins	10 – Croswell	5 – Bynum	Amica Mutual Pavilion (11,018); Providence, RI
November 12, 2022*; 8:00 p.m., FS2		Northeastern	W 89–65	2–0	21 – Bynum	11 – Hopkins	9 – Bynum	Amica Mutual Pavilion (12,011); Providence, RI
November 15, 2022*; 5:00 p.m., FS2		Stonehill	W 100–76	3–0	16 – Tied	9 – Croswell	4 – Tied	Amica Mutual Pavilion (5,887); Providence, RI
November 19, 2022*; 4:00 p.m., ESPNews		vs. Miami (FL); Hall of Fame Tip Off semifinals	L 64–74	3–1	16 – Hopkins	8 – Hopkins	3 – Bynum	Mohegan Sun Arena; Uncasville, CT
November 20, 2022*; 3:30 p.m., ESPNU		vs. Saint Louis; Hall of Fame Tip Off consolation	L 73–76	3–2	20 – Hopkins	10 – Croswell	3 – Tied	Mohegan Sun Arena; Uncasville, CT
November 23, 2022*; 7:00 p.m., FS2		Merrimack	W 71–57	4–2	17 – Croswell	10 – Carter	6 – Bynum	Amica Mutual Pavilion (8,269); Providence, RI
November 26, 2022*; 4:00 p.m., FS2		Columbia	W 78–64	5–2	13 – Tied	7 – Hopkins	8 – Bynum	Amica Mutual Pavilion (9,215); Providence, RI
November 30, 2022*; 8:00 p.m., ESPN+		at TCU; Big East–Big 12 Battle	L 62–75	5–3	17 – Tied	7 – Castro	4 – Tied	Schollmaier Arena (5,593); Fort Worth, TX
December 3, 2022*; 5:00 p.m., ESPNU		at Rhode Island; Ocean State Rivalry	W 88–74	6–3	14 – Tied	15 – Hopkins	5 – Bynum	Ryan Center (7,662); Kingston, RI
December 7, 2022*; 8:30 p.m., FS1		Manhattan	W 99–59	7–3	22 – Hopkins	11 – Hopkins	8 – Bynum	Amica Mutual Pavilion (5,822); Providence, RI
December 10, 2022*; 4:00 p.m., FS1		Albany	W 93–55	8–3	18 – Croswell	10 – Castro	11 – Pierre	Amica Mutual Pavilion (8,229); Providence, RI
Big East regular season
December 17, 2022; 12:00 p.m., FOX		at Seton Hall	W 71–67	9–3 (1–0)	24 – Hopkins	10 – Hopkins	4 – Locke	Prudential Center (10,147); Newark, NJ
December 20, 2022; 7:00 p.m., CBSSN		No. 24 Marquette	W 103–98 ^{2OT}	10–3 (2–0)	29 – Hopkins	23 – Hopkins	4 – Carter	Amica Mutual Pavilion (10,869); Providence, RI
December 29, 2022; 6:30 p.m., FS1		at Butler	W 72–52	11–3 (3–0)	21 – Carter	10 – Croswell	7 – Bynum	Hinkle Fieldhouse (7,577); Indianapolis, IN
January 1, 2023; 6:30 p.m., FS1		at DePaul	W 74–59	12–3 (4–0)	22 – Carter	10 – Croswell	3 – Breed	Wintrust Arena (3,316); Chicago, IL
January 4, 2023; 8:30 p.m., FS1		No. 4 UConn	W 73–61	13–3 (5–0)	27 – Hopkins	13 – Croswell	3 – Breed	Amica Mutual Pavilion (12,400); Providence, RI
January 7, 2023; 12:00 p.m., FS1		St. John's	W 83–80	14–3 (6–0)	20 – Locke	9 – Croswell	5 – Carter	Amica Mutual Pavilion (12,401); Providence, RI
January 14, 2023; 2:00 p.m., FS1	No. 19	at Creighton	L 67–73	14–4 (6–1)	20 – Hopkins	10 – 2 Tied	3 – Carter	CHI Health Center Omaha (17,443); Omaha, NE
January 18, 2023; 9:00 p.m., CBSSN	No. 22	at No. 20 Marquette	L 75–83	14–5 (6–2)	20 – Croswell	10 – Hopkins	4 – Tied	Fiserv Forum (14,544); Milwaukee, WI
January 21, 2023; 2:00 p.m., FS1	No. 22	DePaul	W 75–64	15–5 (7–2)	29 – Locke	11 – Hopkins	5 – Carter	Amica Mutual Pavilion (12,400); Providence, RI
January 25, 2023; 8:30 p.m., FS1	No. 23	Butler	W 79–58	16–5 (8–2)	16 – Hopkins	10 – Carter	4 – Tied	Amica Mutual Pavilion (10,869); Providence, RI
January 29, 2023; 12:00 p.m., FS1	No. 23	at Villanova	W 70–65	17–5 (9–2)	19 – Bynum	9 – Hopkins	5 – Bynum	Wells Fargo Center (15,053); Philadelphia, PA
February 1, 2023; 6:30 p.m., FS1	No. 17	at No. 16 Xavier	L 83–85 ^{OT}	17–6 (9–3)	22 – Locke	13 – Hopkins	6 – Bynum	Cintas Center (10,334); Cincinnati, OH
February 8, 2023; 8:00 p.m., CBSSN	No. 20	Georgetown	W 74–62	18–6 (10–3)	17 – Hopkins	9 – Carter	– Carter 7	Amica Mutual Pavilion (11,892); Providence, RI
February 11, 2023; 12:00 p.m., FOX	No. 20	at St. John's	L 68–73	18–7 (10–4)	29 – Hopkins	9 – Hopkins	10 – Bynum	Madison Square Garden (10,210); New York, NY
February 14, 2023; 7:00 p.m, FS1	No. 24	No. 18 Creighton	W 94–86 ^{2OT}	19–7 (11–4)	25 – Carter	9 – Hopkins	6 – Bynum	Amica Mutual Pavilion (12,400); Providence, RI
February 18, 2023; 4:30 p.m., FOX	No. 24	Villanova	W 85–72	20–7 (12–4)	21 – Croswell	12 – Hopkins	2 – 5 tied	Amica Mutual Pavilion (12,659); Providence, RI
February 22, 2023; 6:30 p.m., FS1	No. 20	at No. 18 UConn	L 69–87	20–8 (12–5)	16 – Hopkins	5 – Croswell	2 – 2 tied	Harry A. Gampel Pavilion (10,167); Storrs, CT
February 26, 2023; 12:38 p.m., FOX	No. 20	at Georgetown	W 88–68	21–8 (13–5)	25 – Croswell	13 – Croswell	6 – Tied	Capital One Arena (7,085); Washington, D.C.
March 1, 2023; 6:30 p.m., FS1	No. 20	No. 19 Xavier	L 89–94	21–9 (13–6)	17 – 2 tied	13 – Croswell	3 – 2 tied	Amica Mutual Pavilion (12,400); Providence, RI
March 4, 2023; 12:00 p.m., FOX	No. 20	Seton Hall	L 58–82	21–10 (13–7)	14 – Carter	9 – Croswell	3 – 2 tied	Amica Mutual Pavilion (11,589); Providence, RI
Big East tournament
March 9, 2023; 2:30 p.m., FS1	(5)	vs. (4) No. 11 UConn; Quarterfinals	L 66–73	21–11	16 – Hopkins	7 – Hopkins	3 – Hopkins	Madison Square Garden; New York, NY
NCAA tournament
March 17, 2023*; 7:10 pm, CBS	(11 E)	vs. (6 E) Kentucky; First Round	L 53–61	21–12	16 – Croswell	8 – Hopkins	5 – Bynum	Greensboro Coliseum; Greensboro, NC
*Non-conference game. ^{#}Rankings from AP Poll. (#) Tournament seedings in parentheses. E=East. All times are in Eastern Time.

== Rankings ==
Ranking movements Legend: ██ Increase in ranking ██ Decrease in ranking — = Not ranked RV = Received votes
	Week																			
Poll	Pre	1	2	3	4	5	6	7	8	9	10	11	12	13	14	15	16	17	18	Final
AP	—							RV	RV	19	22	23	17	20	24	20	20	RV		Not released
Coaches	RV									19	20	21	17	17	21	18	20	RV		
