= 2023 Big East men's basketball tournament =

U.S. collegiate basketball event

- Classification: Division I
- Season: 2022–23
- Teams: 11
- Site: Madison Square Garden; New York City
- Champions: Marquette (1st title)
- Winning coach: Shaka Smart (1st title)
- MVP: Tyler Kolek (Marquette)
- Attendance: 99,060
- Television: FS1, Fox

2022–23 Big East men's basketball standings
	Conf.				Overall
Team	W		L	PCT	W		L	PCT
No. 6 Marquette †	17	–	3	.850	29	–	7	.806
No. 13 Xavier	15	–	5	.750	27	–	10	.730
Creighton	14	–	6	.700	24	–	13	.649
No. 10 UConn	13	–	7	.650	31	–	8	.795
Providence	13	–	7	.650	21	–	12	.636
Villanova	10	–	10	.500	17	–	17	.500
Seton Hall	10	–	10	.500	17	–	16	.515
St. John's	7	–	13	.350	18	–	15	.545
Butler	6	–	14	.300	14	–	18	.438
DePaul	3	–	17	.150	10	–	23	.303
Georgetown	2	–	18	.100	7	–	25	.219
† 2023 Big East tournament winner Rankings from AP poll

The 2023 Big East Men's Basketball Tournament was the postseason collegiate men's basketball tournament for the Big East Conference that took place from March 8 through March 11, 2023, at Madison Square Garden in New York City. The winner received the conference's automatic bid to the NCAA Tournament.

== Seeds ==
All 11 Big East schools participated in the tournament. Teams were seeded by the conference record with tie-breaking procedures to determine the seeds for teams with identical conference records. The top five teams received first-round byes. Seeding for the tournament was determined at the close of the regular conference season.

Seed	School	Conference	Tiebreaker
1	Marquette	17–3	
2	Xavier	15–5	
3	Creighton	14–6	
4	UConn	13–7	NET 6
5	Providence	13–7	NET 51
6	Villanova	10–10	2–0 vs. Seton Hall
7	Seton Hall	10–10	0–2 vs. Villanova
8	St. John's	7–13	
9	Butler	6–14	
10	DePaul	3–17	
11	Georgetown	2–18	

== Schedule ==
Game	Time	Matchup	Score	Television	Attendance
First round – Wednesday, March 8
1	3:00 pm	No. 8 St. John's vs. No. 9 Butler	76–63	FS1	19,812
2	5:30 pm	No. 7 Seton Hall vs. No. 10 DePaul	65–66	FS1	19,812
3	8:15 pm	No. 6 Villanova vs. No. 11 Georgetown	80–48	FS1	19,812
Quarterfinals – Thursday, March 9
4	12:00 pm	No. 1 Marquette vs. No. 8 St. John's	72–70^{OT}	FS1	19,812
5	2:30 pm	No. 4 UConn vs. No. 5 Providence	73–66	FS1	19,812
6	7:00 pm	No. 2 Xavier vs. No. 10 DePaul	89–84	FS1	19,812
7	9:30 pm	No. 3 Creighton vs. No. 6 Villanova	87–74	FS1	19,812
Semifinals – Friday, March 10
8	6:30 pm	No. 1 Marquette vs. No. 4 UConn	70–68	FS1	19,812
9	9:00 pm	No. 2 Xavier vs. No. 3 Creighton	82–60	FS1	19,812
Championship – Saturday, March 11
10	6:30 pm	No. 1 Marquette vs. No. 2 Xavier	65–51	FOX	19,812
Game times in Eastern Time. Rankings denote tournament seed.

== Bracket ==
First round Wednesday, March 8 FS1
8	St. John's	76
9	Butler	63
7	Seton Hall	65
10	DePaul	66
6	Villanova	80
11	Georgetown	48

Quarterfinals; Thursday, March 9 FS1
1	#6 Marquette	72*
8	St. John's	70
4	#11 UConn	73
5	Providence	66
2	#15 Xavier	89
10	DePaul	84
3	#24 Creighton	87
6	Villanova	74

Semifinals; Friday, March 10; FS1
1	#6 Marquette	70
4	#11 UConn	68
2	#15 Xavier	82
3	#24 Creighton	60

Championship; Saturday, March 11; FOX
1	#6 Marquette	65
2	#15 Xavier	51

* denotes overtime period
