= 2022–23 Marquette Golden Eagles men's basketball team =

2022–23 Marquette Golden Eagles men's basketball
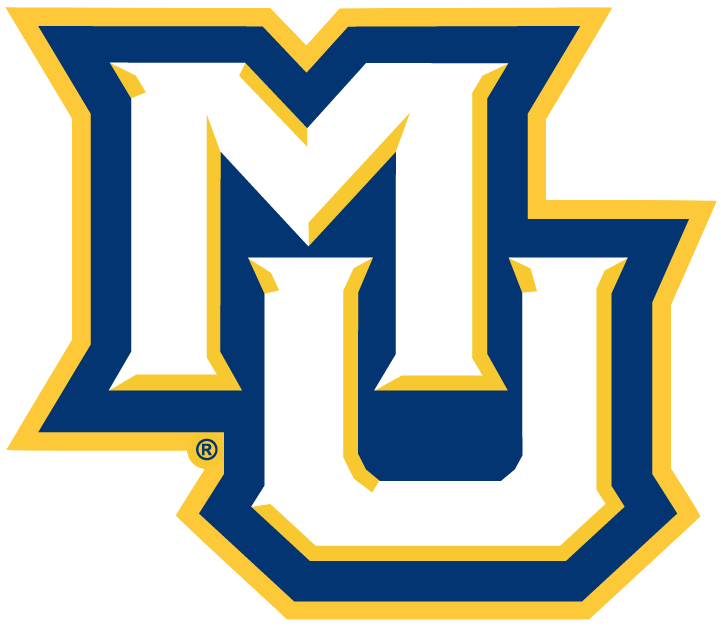

Big East regular season champions Big East tournament champions

NCAA tournament, Second Round
- Conference: Big East Conference

Ranking
- Coaches: No. 14
- AP: No. 6
- Record: 29–7 (17–3 Big East)
- Head coach: Shaka Smart (2nd season)
- Assistant coaches: Neill Berry (2nd season); Cody Hatt (2nd season); DeAndre Haynes (2nd season)
- Home arena: Fiserv Forum (Capacity: 17,341)

2022–23 Big East men's basketball standings
	Conf.				Overall
Team	W		L	PCT	W		L	PCT
No. 6 Marquette †	17	–	3	.850	29	–	7	.806
No. 13 Xavier	15	–	5	.750	27	–	10	.730
Creighton	14	–	6	.700	24	–	13	.649
No. 10 UConn	13	–	7	.650	31	–	8	.795
Providence	13	–	7	.650	21	–	12	.636
Villanova	10	–	10	.500	17	–	17	.500
Seton Hall	10	–	10	.500	17	–	16	.515
St. John's	7	–	13	.350	18	–	15	.545
Butler	6	–	14	.300	14	–	18	.438
DePaul	3	–	17	.150	10	–	23	.303
Georgetown	2	–	18	.100	7	–	25	.219
† 2023 Big East tournament winner Rankings from AP poll

The 2022–23 Marquette Golden Eagles men's basketball team represented Marquette University during the 2022–23 NCAA Division I men's basketball season. The team is led by second-year head coach Shaka Smart and plays their home games at Fiserv Forum in Milwaukee, Wisconsin as a member of the Big East Conference. The Eagles finished the season 29–7, 17–3 in Big East play to win the regular season championship. They defeated St. John's, UConn, and Xavier to win the Big East tournament. As a result, they received the conference's automatic bid to the NCAA tournament as the No. 2 seed in the East region. They defeated Vermont in the First Round before losing to Michigan State in the Second Round of the tournament.

== Previous season ==
The Golden Eagles finished the 2021–22 season 19–13, 11–8 in Big East play to finish a tie for fifth place. As the No. 5 seed, they lost in the quarterfinals of the Big East tournament to Creighton. They received an at-large bid to the NCAA tournament as the No. 9 seed in the East Region, where they lost in the First Round to North Carolina.

== Offseason ==
=== Departures ===
Name	Number	Pos.	Height	Weight	Year	Hometown	Reason for departure
Greg Elliott	5	G	6'3"	180	RS Senior	Detroit, MI	Graduate transferred to Pittsburgh
Justin Lewis	10	F	6'7"	245	Sophomore	Baltimore, MD	Declare for 2022 NBA draft
Darryl Morsell	32	G	6'5"	205	GS Senior	Baltimore, MD	Graduated
Kur Kuath	35	F	6'10"	215	GS Senior	Biemnon, South Sudan	Graduated
Brendan Carney	41	G	6'2"	190	Junior	Menlo Park, CA	Walk-on; left the team for personal reasons

=== Incoming transfers ===
Name	Number	Pos.	Height	Weight	Year	Hometown	Previous school
Zach Wrightsil	10	G/F	6'7"	205	GS Senior	Prosper, TX	Loyola (New Orleans)

=== Recruiting classes ===
==== 2022 recruiting class ====
College recruiting information
Name	Hometown	School	Height	Weight	Commit date
Sean Jones #12 PG	Gahanna, OH	Lincoln High School	5 ft 10 in (1.78 m)	175 lb (79 kg)	Aug 13, 2021
Sean Jones #12 PG	Recruit ratings: Scout: Rivals: 247Sports: ESPN: (82)				
Chase Ross #33 SG	Ashburnham, MA	Cushing Academy	6 ft 4 in (1.93 m)	185 lb (84 kg)	Sep 24, 2021
Chase Ross #33 SG	Recruit ratings: Scout: Rivals: 247Sports: ESPN: (81)				
Ben Gold; SF	Wellington, New Zealand	Australian Institute of Sport	6 ft 10 in (2.08 m)	206 lb (93 kg)	Feb 14, 2022
Ben Gold; SF	Recruit ratings: Scout: Rivals: 247Sports: ESPN: (NR)				
Overall recruit ranking: Rivals: 14 247Sports: 23 ESPN: 17
Note: In many cases, Scout, Rivals, 247Sports, On3, and ESPN may conflict in their listings of height and weight.; In these cases, the average was taken. ESPN grades are on a 100-point scale.; Sources: "2022 Marquette Basketball Commitments". Rivals.; "2022 Team Ranking". Rivals.

==== 2023 recruiting class ====
College recruiting information (2023)
Name	Hometown	School	Height	Weight	Commit date
Tre Norman #19 PG	Worcester, MA	Worcester Academy	6 ft 3 in (1.91 m)	190 lb (86 kg)	Sep 6, 2022
Tre Norman #19 PG	Recruit ratings: Scout: Rivals: 247Sports: ESPN: (82)				
Alassane Amadou #27 C	Philadelphia, PA	Chestnut Hill Academy	6 ft 4 in (1.93 m)	185 lb (84 kg)	Aug 18, 2022
Alassane Amadou #27 C	Recruit ratings: Scout: Rivals: 247Sports: ESPN: (82)				
Zaide Lowery #28 SG	Springfield, MO	La Lumiere School	6 ft 3 in (1.91 m)	170 lb (77 kg)	Apr 19, 2022
Zaide Lowery #28 SG	Recruit ratings: Scout: Rivals: 247Sports: ESPN: (81)				
Overall recruit ranking: Rivals: 14 247Sports: 23 ESPN: 17
Note: In many cases, Scout, Rivals, 247Sports, On3, and ESPN may conflict in their listings of height and weight.; In these cases, the average was taken. ESPN grades are on a 100-point scale.; Sources: "2023 Marquette Basketball Commitments". Rivals.; "2023 Team Ranking". Rivals.

== Roster ==
2022–23 Marquette Golden Eagles men's basketball team
Players
Coaches

Pos.	#	Name	Height	Weight	Year	Previous school	Hometown
G	1	Kam Jones	6 ft 4 in (1.93 m)	195 lb (88 kg)	So	Evangelical Christian	Cordova, TN
G	2	Emarion Ellis	6 ft 5 in (1.96 m)	200 lb (91 kg)	So	Assumption HS	Davenport, IA
G	4	Stevie Mitchell	6 ft 2 in (1.88 m)	195 lb (88 kg)	RS So	Wilson HS	Reading, PA
G	5	Chase Ross	6 ft 4 in (1.93 m)	195 lb (88 kg)	Fr	Cushing Academy	Dallas, TX
F	10	Zach Wrightsil	6 ft 7 in (2.01 m)	215 lb (98 kg)	GS	Loyola (New Orleans)	Prosper, TX
G	11	Tyler Kolek	6 ft 3 in (1.91 m)	190 lb (86 kg)	RS So	George Mason	Cumberland, RI
F	12	Olivier-Maxence Prosper	6 ft 8 in (2.03 m)	230 lb (104 kg)	So	Clemson	Montreal, QC
F	13	Oso Ighodaro	6 ft 9 in (2.06 m)	215 lb (98 kg)	RS So	Desert Vista HS	Chandler, AZ
F	21	Ben Gold	6 ft 11 in (2.11 m)	220 lb (100 kg)	Fr	NBA Global Academy	Wellington, New Zealand
G	22	Sean Jones	5 ft 10 in (1.78 m)	175 lb (79 kg)	Fr	Lincoln HS	Gahanna, OH
F	23	David Joplin	6 ft 7 in (2.01 m)	220 lb (100 kg)	So	Brookfield Central HS	Brookfield, WI
G	25	Caleb Kozinski (W)	6 ft 1 in (1.85 m)	170 lb (77 kg)	Fr	IMG Academy	Milwaukee, WI
F	40	Keeyan Itejere	6 ft 9 in (2.06 m)	215 lb (98 kg)	RS Fr	Grace Christian School	Knightdale, NC
G	41	Jonah Lucas (W)	6 ft 1 in (1.85 m)	170 lb (77 kg)	Fr	Harrison HS	West Lafayette, IN
F	42	Michael Kennedy (W)	6 ft 6 in (1.98 m)	190 lb (86 kg)	RS Jr	Homestead HS	Mequon, WI
G	51	RJ Walson (W)	6 ft 0 in (1.83 m)	200 lb (91 kg)	RS So	Perspectives Math & Science Academy	Chicago, IL
G	54	Jake Ciardo (W)	6 ft 2 in (1.88 m)	170 lb (77 kg)	RS Fr	Germantown HS	Germantown, WI
G	55	Cameron Brown (W)	6 ft 1 in (1.85 m)	195 lb (88 kg)	So	John Paul II HS	Plano, TX

Head coach

- Shaka Smart (Kenyon)

Assistant coach(es)

- Neill Berry (Southeastern Louisiana)
- Cody Hatt (Norwich)
- DeAndre Haynes (Kent State)

Legend

- (C) Team captain
- (S) Suspended
- (I) Ineligible
- (W) Walk-on
- Injured
- Current redshirt

Roster

== Schedule and results ==
Date time, TV	Rank^{#}	Opponent^{#}	Result	Record	High points	High rebounds	High assists	Site (attendance) city, state
Non-conference regular season
November 7, 2022*; 7:30 p.m., FS1		Radford	W 79–69	1–0	19 – Ighodaro	8 – Kolek	9 – Kolek	Fiserv Forum (12,393); Milwaukee, WI
November 10, 2022*; 7:00 p.m., FS2		Central Michigan	W 97–73	2–0	23 – Joplin	6 – Prosper	11 – Kolek	Al McGuire Center (3,706); Milwaukee, WI
November 15, 2022*; 7:30 p.m., FS1		at Purdue; Gavitt Tipoff Games	L 70–75	2–1	21 – Joplin	9 – Joplin	11 – Kolek	Mackey Arena (14,876); West Lafayette, IN
November 17, 2022*; 7:30 p.m., FS2		LIU; Fort Myers Tip-Off campus site game	W 95–58	3–1	31 – Prosper	7 – Joplin	8 – Kolek	Fiserv Forum (12.476); Milwaukee, WI
November 21, 2022*; 5:00 p.m., FS1		vs. Mississippi State; Fort Myers Tip-Off semifinals	L 55–58	3–2	16 – Kolek	9 – Prosper	5 – Ighodaro	Suncoast Credit Union Arena (1,894); Fort Myers, FL
November 23, 2022*; 5:00 p.m., FS1		vs. Georgia Tech; Fort Myers Tip-Off consolation	W 84–60	4–2	19 – K. Jones	10 – Ighodaro	6 – Kolek	Suncoast Credit Union Arena (1,691); Fort Myers, FL
November 26, 2022*; 7:30 p.m., FS2		Chicago State	W 82–68	5–2	18 – Prosper	11 – Prosper	8 – Kolek	Fiserv Forum (12,812); Milwaukee, WI
November 29, 2022*; 7:30 p.m., FS1		No. 6 Baylor; Big East–Big 12 Battle	W 96–70	6–2	24 – Prosper	7 – Ighodaro	11 – Kolek	Fiserv Forum (14,022); Milwaukee, WI
December 3, 2022*; 3:30 p.m., FS1		Wisconsin; Rivalry	L 77–80 ^{OT}	6–3	26 – K. Jones	6 – K. Jones	8 – Kolek	Fiserv Forum (17,760); Milwaukee, WI
December 6, 2022*; 7:30 p.m., FS1		North Carolina Central	W 90–78	7–3	25 – Prosper	4 – 4 Tied	7 – Ighodaro	Fiserv Forum (12,244); Milwaukee, WI
December 11, 2022*; 3:00 p.m., ESPN2		at Notre Dame	W 79–64	8–3	25 – K. Jones	18 – Ighodaro	6 – Kolek	Joyce Center (7,098); South Bend, IN
Big East regular season
December 16, 2022; 7:30 p.m., FS1		Creighton	W 69–58	9–3 (1–0)	16 – Ighodaro	6 – Tied	7 – Kolek	Fiserv Forum (15,389); Milwaukee, WI
December 20, 2022; 6:00 p.m., CBSSN	No. 24	at Providence	L 98–103 ^{2OT}	9–4 (1–1)	29 – Kolek	6 – Ighodaro	4 – Ighodaro	Amica Mutual Pavilion (10,869); Providence, RI
December 27, 2022; 7:00 p.m., FS1		Seton Hall	W 83–69	10–4 (2–1)	16 – Ighodaro	10 – Ighodaro	8 – Kolek	Fiserv Forum (14,806); Milwaukee, WI
December 31, 2022; 1:00 p.m., FS1		at Villanova	W 68–66	11–4 (3–1)	19 – Mitchell	5 – Tied	8 – Kolek	Finneran Pavilion (6,501); Villanova, PA
January 3, 2023; 8:00 p.m., FS1		at St. John's	W 96–85	12–4 (4–1)	29 – Prosper	7 – Prosper	8 – Kolek	Carnesecca Arena (3,770); Queens, NY
January 7, 2023; 1:00 p.m., FS1		Georgetown	W 95–73	13–4 (5–1)	17 – K. Jones	5 – K. Jones	15 – Kolek	Fiserv Forum (15,454); Milwaukee, WI
January 11, 2023; 6:00 p.m., CBSSN	No. 25	No. 6 UConn	W 82–76	14–4 (6–1)	19 – Ighodaro	6 – Prosper	8 – Kolek	Fiserv Forum (15,116); Milwaukee, WI
January 15, 2023; 11:00 a.m., FOX	No. 25	at No. 12 Xavier	L 76–80	14–5 (6–2)	25 – Kolek	8 – Ighodaro	7 – Kolek	Cintas Center (10,508); Cincinnati, OH
January 18, 2023; 8:00 p.m., CBSSN	No. 20	No. 22 Providence	W 83–75	15–5 (7–2)	21 – K. Jones	8 – Kolek	6 – Kolek	Fiserv Forum (14,544); Milwaukee, WI
January 21, 2023; 3:00 p.m., CBSSN	No. 20	at Seton Hall	W 74–53	16–5 (8–2)	22 – K. Jones	6 – Ighodaro	6 – Kolek	Prudential Center (9,796); Newark, NJ
January 28, 2023; 1:00 p.m., FS1	No. 16	at DePaul	W 89–69	17–5 (9–2)	28 – Joplin	9 – Kolek	10 – Kolek	Wintrust Arena (10,387); Chicago, IL
February 1, 2023; 7:30 p.m., FS1	No. 14	Villanova	W 73–64	18–5 (10–2)	20 – Kolek	5 – Tied	6 – Kolek	Fiserv Forum (13,344); Milwaukee, WI
February 4, 2023; 1:00 p.m., FS1	No. 14	Butler	W 60–52	19–5 (11–2)	13 – Kolek	6 – Joplin	8 – Kolek	Fiserv Forum (17,592); Milwaukee, WI
February 7, 2023; 5:30 p.m., FS1	No. 10	at No. 21 UConn	L 72–87	19–6 (11–3)	17 – Kolek	5 – Prosper	4 – Kolek	XL Center (15,564); Hartford, CT
February 11, 2023; 11:00 a.m., FS1	No. 10	at Georgetown	W 89–75	20–6 (12–3)	14 – Tied	7 – Tied	8 – Kolek	Capital One Arena (7,111); Washington, D.C.
February 15, 2023; 6:00 p.m., CBSSN	No. 11	No. 16 Xavier	W 69–68	21–6 (13–3)	17 – Mitchell	9 – Ighodaro	5 – Kolek	Fiserv Forum (16,041); Milwaukee, WI
February 21, 2023; 7:30 p.m., FS1	No. 10	at No. 19 Creighton	W 73–71	22–6 (14–3)	19 – K. Jones	6 – Tied	6 – Kolek	CHI Health Center Omaha (18,006); Omaha, NE
February 25, 2023; 6:30 p.m., FS1	No. 10	DePaul	W 90–84	23–6 (15–3)	22 – Tied	6 – Prosper	14 – Kolek	Fiserv Forum (17,873); Milwaukee, WI
February 28, 2023; 5:30 p.m., FS1	No. 6	at Butler	W 72–56	24–6 (16–3)	21 – Kolek	6 – Ighodaro	10 – Kolek	Hinkle Fieldhouse (7,511); Indianapolis, IN
March 4, 2023; 1:00 p.m., FOX	No. 6	St. John's	W 96–94	25–6 (17–3)	23 – K. Jones	6 – Prosper	10 – Kolek	Fiserv Forum (18,012); Milwaukee, WI
Big East tournament
March 9, 2023; 11:00 a.m., FS1	(1) No. 6	vs. (8) St. John's; Quarterfinals	W 72–70 ^{OT}	26–6	19 – Kolek	11 – Ighodaro	6 – Kolek	Madison Square Garden (19,812); New York, NY
March 10, 2023; 6:30 p.m., FS1	(1) No. 6	vs. (4) No. 11 UConn; Semifinals	W 70–68	27–6	17 – 2 Tied	6 – Jones	6 – Kolek	Madison Square Garden (19,812); New York, NY
March 11, 2023; 6:30 p.m., FOX	(1) No. 6	vs. (2) No. 15 Xavier; Championship	W 65–51	28–6	20 – Kolek	9 – Ighodaro	4 – Jones	Madison Square Garden (19,812); New York, NY
NCAA tournament
March 17, 2023; 1:45 p.m., CBS	(2 E) No. 6	vs. (15 E) Vermont; First Round	W 78–61	29–6	19 – Jones	7 – Mitchell	5 – Ighodaro	Nationwide Arena (19,564); Columbus, OH
March 19, 2023; 4:15 p.m., CBS	(2 E) No. 6	vs. (7 E) Michigan State; Second Round	L 60–69	29–7	16 – Prosper	7 – Ighodaro	5 – Kolek	Nationwide Arena (19,566); Columbus, OH
*Non-conference game. ^{#}Rankings from AP Poll. (#) Tournament seedings in parentheses. E=East. All times are in Central Time.
