= 2022–23 DePaul Blue Demons men's basketball team =

American college basketball season

2022–23 DePaul Blue Demons men's basketball
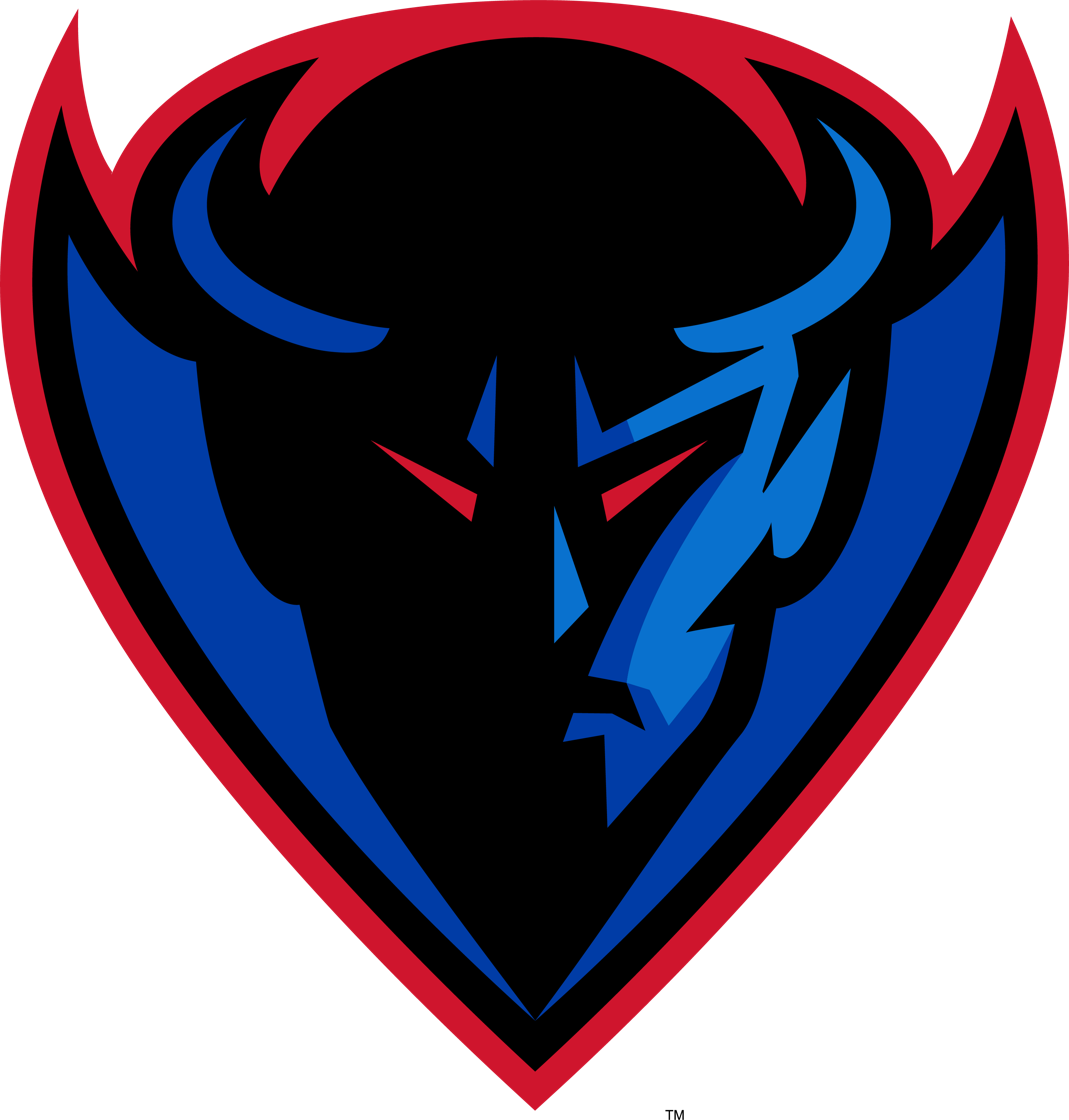
- Conference: Big East Conference
- Record: 10–23 (3–17 Big East)
- Head coach: Tony Stubblefield (2nd season)
- Assistant coaches: Paris Parham (2nd season); Bino Ranson (2nd season); Steve Thomas (2nd season)
- Home arena: Wintrust Arena

2022–23 Big East men's basketball standings
	Conf.				Overall
Team	W		L	PCT	W		L	PCT
No. 6 Marquette †	17	–	3	.850	29	–	7	.806
No. 13 Xavier	15	–	5	.750	27	–	10	.730
Creighton	14	–	6	.700	24	–	13	.649
No. 10 UConn	13	–	7	.650	31	–	8	.795
Providence	13	–	7	.650	21	–	12	.636
Villanova	10	–	10	.500	17	–	17	.500
Seton Hall	10	–	10	.500	17	–	16	.515
St. John's	7	–	13	.350	18	–	15	.545
Butler	6	–	14	.300	14	–	18	.438
DePaul	3	–	17	.150	10	–	23	.303
Georgetown	2	–	18	.100	7	–	25	.219
† 2023 Big East tournament winner Rankings from AP poll

The 2022–23 DePaul Blue Demons men's basketball team represented DePaul University during the 2022–23 NCAA Division I men's basketball season. They were led by second-year head coach Tony Stubblefield and played their home games at Wintrust Arena in Chicago, Illinois as members of the Big East Conference. The Demons finished the season 10–23, 3–17 in Big East play to finish in tenth place. They defeated Seton Hall in the first round of the Big East tournament before losing to Xavier in the quarterfinals.

On January 10, 2023, DePaul defeated Villanova for the first time since 2008, snapping a 22-game losing streak to the Wildcats over 15 years.

== Previous season ==
The Blue Demons finished the 2021–22 season 15–16, 6–14 in Big East play to finish in 10th place. They lost in the first round of the Big East tournament to St. John's.

== Offseason ==
=== Departures ===
DePaul Departures
Name	Number	Pos.	Height	Weight	Year	Hometown	Reason for departure
Javon Freeman-Liberty	4	G	6'4"	180	Senior	Chicago, IL	Graduated/went undrafted in 2022 NBA draft
Tyon Grant-Foster	13	G	6'7"	205	Senior	Kansas City, KS	Graduated
Courvoisier McCauley	23	G	6'5"	211	RS Senior	Indianapolis, IN	Graduate transfer to Indiana State
David Jones	32	F	6'6"	195	Sophomore	Santo Domingo, DR	Transferred to St. John's
Brandon Johnson	35	F	6'8"	220	GS Senior	Chicago, IL	Graduated
Shaheed Medlock	45	G	6'5"	196	GS Senior	Minneapolis, MN	Graduated

=== Incoming transfers ===
DePaul Transfers
Name	Number	Pos.	Height	Weight	Year	Hometown	Previous School
Umoja Gibson	2	G	6'1"	169	GS Senior	Waco, TX	Oklahoma
K. T. Raimey	4	G	6'1"		Junior	Olathe, KS	College of Southern Idaho
Eral Penn	11	F	6'7"		GS Senior	Brooklyn, NY	LIU
Da'Sean Nelson	21	F	6'8"	190	Sophomore	Toledo, OH	Kilgore College
Caleb Murphy	23	G	6'4"	185	Junior	Youngstown, OH	South Florida

=== 2022 recruiting class ===
College recruiting
Name	Hometown	School	Height	Weight	Commit date
Zion Cruz; SG	Jersey City, NJ	Donda Academy	6 ft 4 in (1.93 m)	175 lb (79 kg)	Feb 22, 2022
Zion Cruz; SG	Recruit ratings: Scout: Rivals: 247Sports: ESPN: (83)				
Overall recruit ranking:
Note: In many cases, Scout, Rivals, 247Sports, On3, and ESPN may conflict in their listings of height and weight.; In these cases, the average was taken. ESPN grades are on a 100-point scale.; Sources: "2022 DePaul Signees". Rivals.; "2022 DePaul Signees". ESPN.; "2022 Team Ranking". Rivals.

== Roster ==
2022–23 DePaul Blue Demons men's basketball team
Players
Coaches

Pos.	#	Name	Height	Weight	Year	Previous school	Hometown
G	0	Zion Cruz	6 ft 4 in (1.93 m)	183 lb (83 kg)	Fr	Donda Academy	Jersey City, NJ
F	1	Javan Johnson	6 ft 6 in (1.98 m)	198 lb (90 kg)	RS Sr	Austin; Iowa State	Decatur, AL
G	2	Umoja Gibson	6 ft 1 in (1.85 m)	173 lb (78 kg)	GS	University; North Texas	Waco, TX
G	3	Jalen Terry	6 ft 0 in (1.83 m)	158 lb (72 kg)	Jr	Beecher; Oregon	Flint, MI
G/F	4	K. T. Raimey	6 ft 3 in (1.91 m)	166 lb (75 kg)	Jr	Olathe North; College of Southern Idaho	Olathe, KS
G	5	Philmon Gebrewhit	6 ft 7 in (2.01 m)	185 lb (84 kg)	RS Sr	Holderness School; South Plains College	Boston, MA
F	10	Yor Anei	6 ft 10 in (2.08 m)	228 lb (103 kg)	Sr	Lee's Summit West; SMU	Overland Park, KS
F	11	Eral Penn	6 ft 6 in (1.98 m)	201 lb (91 kg)	GS	Saint Frances (MD); LIU	Brooklyn, NY
G	12	Ahamad Bynum	6 ft 2 in (1.88 m)	178 lb (81 kg)	RS Fr	Simeon	Chicago, IL
C	14	Nick Ongenda	6 ft 11 in (2.11 m)	230 lb (104 kg)	Sr	Southwest Christian Academy (AR)	Mississauga, Ontario
G	20	Brendan Favre (W)	6 ft 5 in (1.96 m)	192 lb (87 kg)	Sr	IMG Academy (FL)	Vevey, Switzerland
F	21	Da'Sean Nelson	6 ft 8 in (2.03 m)	205 lb (93 kg)	Jr	Robert S. Rogers; Kilgore College	Toledo, OH
G	23	Caleb Murphy	6 ft 4 in (1.93 m)	185 lb (84 kg)	Jr	Grayson; South Florida	Youngstown, OH
G	30	Max Williams (W)	6 ft 2 in (1.88 m)	192 lb (87 kg)	Jr	IMG Academy (FL)	Chicago, IL

Head coach

- Tony Stubblefield (Omaha)

Assistant coach(es)

- Paris Parham (Minnesota State)
- Bino Ranson (Southern New Hampshire)
- Steve Thomas (Rowan)

Legend

- (C) Team captain
- (S) Suspended
- (I) Ineligible
- (W) Walk-on
- Injured
- Current redshirt

Roster

== Schedule and results ==
Date time, TV	Rank^{#}	Opponent^{#}	Result	Record	High points	High rebounds	High assists	Site (attendance) city, state
Regular season
November 7, 2022*; 6:45 p.m., FS1		Loyola (MD)	W 72–66	1–0	24 – Johnson	10 – Johnson	6 – Gibson	Wintrust Arena (2,973); Chicago, IL
November 11, 2022*; 9:00 p.m., FS2		Western Illinois; Bahamas Championship campus site game	W 86–74	2–0	23 – Gibson	7 – Nelson	8 – Gibson	Wintrust Arena (2,977); Chicago, IL
November 14, 2022*; 6:00 p.m., BTN		at Minnesota; Gavitt Tipoff Games	W 69–53	3–0	20 – Johnson	14 – Penn	8 – Gibson	Williams Arena (8,426); Minneapolis, MN
November 18, 2022*; 8:30 p.m., CBSSN		vs. Santa Clara; Bahamas Championship semifinals	L 61–69	3–1	18 – Gibson	11 – Penn	4 – Gibson	Baha Mar Convention Center (687); Nassau, BAH
November 20, 2022*; 3:30 p.m., CBSSN		vs. Oklahoma State; Bahamas Championship consolation	L 78–82	3–2	25 – Penn	11 – Penn	6 – Gibson	Baha Mar Convention Center; Nassau, BAH
November 25, 2022*; 12:00 p.m., FS1		Texas A&M	L 66–82	3–3	21 – Penn	10 – Penn	10 – Gibson	Wintrust Arena (2,703); Chicago, IL
November 30, 2022*; 8:00 p.m., FS2		Samford	W 103–98 ^{OT}	4–3	28 – Johnson	7 – Penn	9 – Gibson	Wintrust Arena (2,342); Chicago, IL
December 3, 2022*; 3:00 p.m., NBCSCHI		at Loyola–Chicago	W 78–72 ^{OT}	5–3	27 – Johnson	5 – Terry	6 – Johnson	Joseph J. Gentile Arena (4,557); Chicago, IL
December 7, 2022; 5:30 p.m., FS1		at St. John's	L 67–86	5–4 (0–1)	14 – Cruz	9 – Nelson	4 – Johnson	Carnesecca Arena (4,285); Queens, NY
December 10, 2022*; 5:30 p.m., FS1		UTEP	W 91–70	6–4	23 – Johnson	8 – Penn	4 – Terry	Wintrust Arena (3,005); Chicago, IL
December 14, 2022*; 6:00 p.m., ESPN+		at Duquesne	L 55–66	6–5	19 – Johnson	7 – Nelson	4 – Nelson	UPMC Cooper Fieldhouse (1,873); Pittsburgh, PA
December 17, 2022*; 1:00 p.m., BTN		at Northwestern	L 45–83	6–6	11 – Tied	9 – Nelson	3 – Gibson	Welsh–Ryan Arena (4,081); Evanston, IL
December 25, 2022; 3:30 p.m., FOX		at Creighton	L 65–80	6–7 (0–2)	14 – Tied	12 – Penn	3 – Gibson	CHI Health Center Omaha (16,534); Omaha, NE
December 29, 2022; 7:00 p.m., FS2		Georgetown	W 83–76	7–7 (1–2)	31 – Gibson	5 – Tied	5 – Tied	Wintrust Arena (4,097); Chicago, IL
January 1, 2023; 5:30 p.m., FS1		Providence	L 59–74	7–8 (1–3)	17 – Nelson	7 – Nelson	3 – Tied	Wintrust Arena (3,316); Chicago, IL
January 4, 2023; 8:00 p.m., CBSSN		at Butler	L 70–78	7–9 (1–4)	16 – Gibson	7 – Penn	8 – Gibson	Hinkle Fieldhouse (7,015); Indianapolis, IN
January 10, 2023; 8:00 p.m., CBSSN		Villanova	W 75–65	8–9 (2–4)	24 – Nelson	8 – Nelson	5 – Gibson	Wintrust Arena (4,273); Chicago, IL
January 14, 2023; 11:00 a.m., FS1		Seton Hall	L 67–71	8–10 (2–5)	15 – Nelson	11 – Penn	5 – Gibson	Wintrust Arena (4,502); Chicago, IL
January 18, 2023; 7:30 p.m., FS1		No. 8 Xavier	W 73–72	9–10 (3–5)	22 – Gibson	10 – Penn	5 – Gibson	Wintrust Arena (4,252); Chicago, IL
January 21, 2023; 1:00 p.m., FS1		at No. 22 Providence	L 64–75	9–11 (3–6)	16 – Gibson	7 – Anei	5 – Gibson	Amica Mutual Pavilion (12,400); Providence, RI
January 24, 2023; 6:00 p.m., FS1		at Georgetown	L 76–81	9–12 (3–7)	24 – Gibson	13 – Penn	4 – Gibson	Capital One Arena (3,724); Washington, DC
January 28, 2023; 1:00 p.m., FS1		No. 16 Marquette	L 69–89	9–13 (3–8)	25 – Gibson	9 – Nelson	5 – Tied	Wintrust Arena (10,387); Chicago, IL
January 31, 2023; 7:00 p.m., FS1		No. 24 UConn	L 76–90	9–14 (3–9)	19 – Johnson	4 – Tied	8 – Gibson	Wintrust Arena (3,956); Chicago, IL
February 5, 2023; 11:00 a.m., FS1		at Seton Hall	L 64–69	9–15 (3–10)	21 – Gibson	10 – Penn	4 – Murphy	Prudential Center (9,770); Newark, NJ
February 8, 2023; 7:30 p.m., FS1		at Villanova	L 65–81	9–16 (3–11)	18 – Tied	9 – Penn	3 – Tied	Finneran Pavilion (6,501); Villanova, PA
February 14, 2023; 8:00 p.m., FS1		St. John's	L 83–92 ^{2OT}	9–17 (3–12)	26 – Johnson	8 – Nelson	5 – Tied	Wintrust Arena (3,018); Chicago, IL
February 18, 2023; 3:00 p.m., CBSSN		at No. 16 Xavier	L 68–82	9–18 (3–13)	17 – Gibson	8 – Ongenda	4 – Johnson	Cintas Center (10,403); Cincinnati, OH
February 22, 2023; 7:30 p.m., FS1		Butler	L 58–59	9–19 (3–14)	25 – Gibson	8 – Tied	4 – Murphy	Wintrust Arena (4,356); Chicago, IL
February 25, 2023; 6:30 p.m., FS1		at No. 10 Marquette	L 84–90	9–20 (3–15)	20 – Gibson	12 – Ongenda	8 – Gibson	Fiserv Forum (17,873); Milwaukee, WI
March 1, 2023; 6:00 p.m., CBSSN		at No. 14 UConn	L 59–88	9–21 (3–16)	17 – Ongenda	6 – Ongenda	2 – Gibson	Harry A. Gampel Pavilion (15,564); Storrs, CT
March 4, 2023; 8:00 p.m., FS1		Creighton	L 70–84	9–22 (3–17)	18 – Johnson	6 – Penn	4 – Gibson	Wintrust Arena (4,514); Chicago, IL
Big East tournament
March 8, 2023*; 4:30 p.m., FS1	(10)	vs. (7) Seton Hall; First round	W 66–65	10–22	19 – Johnson	4 – Johnson	4 – Gibson	Madison Square Garden; New York City, NY
March 9, 2023*; 7:00 p.m., FS1	(10)	vs. (2) No. 15 Xavier; Quarterfinals	L 84–89	10–23	22 – Gibson	4 – Tied	6 – Gibson	Madison Square Garden; New York City, NY
*Non-conference game. ^{#}Rankings from AP Poll. (#) Tournament seedings in parentheses. All times are in Central Time.
