= 2022–23 Georgetown Hoyas men's basketball team =

American college basketball season

2022–23 Georgetown Hoyas men's basketball
- Conference: Big East
- Record: 7–25 (2–18 Big East)
- Head coach: Patrick Ewing (6th season)
- Assistant coaches: Patrick Baldwin; Kevin Nickelberry; Clinton Crouch
- Home arena: Capital One Arena

2022–23 Big East men's basketball standings
	Conf.				Overall
Team	W		L	PCT	W		L	PCT
No. 6 Marquette †	17	–	3	.850	29	–	7	.806
No. 13 Xavier	15	–	5	.750	27	–	10	.730
Creighton	14	–	6	.700	24	–	13	.649
No. 10 UConn	13	–	7	.650	31	–	8	.795
Providence	13	–	7	.650	21	–	12	.636
Villanova	10	–	10	.500	17	–	17	.500
Seton Hall	10	–	10	.500	17	–	16	.515
St. John's	7	–	13	.350	18	–	15	.545
Butler	6	–	14	.300	14	–	18	.438
DePaul	3	–	17	.150	10	–	23	.303
Georgetown	2	–	18	.100	7	–	25	.219
† 2023 Big East tournament winner Rankings from AP poll

The 2022–23 Georgetown Hoyas men's basketball team represented Georgetown University in the 2022–23 NCAA Division I men's basketball season. The Hoyas, led by sixth-year head coach Patrick Ewing, were members of the Big East Conference. The Hoyas played their home games at Capital One Arena in Washington, D.C. They finished the season 7–25, 2–18 in Big East play to finish in last place for the second consecutive year. In the Big East tournament, they lost to Villanova in the opening round.

On March 9, 2023, the school fired head coach Patrick Ewing. On March 20, the school named Providence head coach Ed Cooley the team's new head coach for the 2023–24 season.

== Previous season ==
Due to the COVID-19 pandemic, the Hoyas had one conference game canceled during the 2020–2021 season. They had an historically bad season, posting a final record of 6–25. They went 0–19 in Big East play, and finished in last place in the 11-team conference. In the Big East tournament, they lost to Seton Hall in the first round, bringing their season to an end.

== Offseason ==
=== Departures ===
Name	No.	Pos.	Height	Weight	Year	Hometown	Reason
Aminu Mohammed	0	G	6'5"	210	Freshman	Temple Hills, MD	Entered 2022 NBA draft
Tre King	1	F	6'7"	235	Senior	Lexington, KY	Dismissed from university in October 2021; transferred to Iowa State
Tyler Beard	3	G	6'2"	180	Freshman	Chicago, IL	Transferred to Pacific
Jalin Billingsley	4	F	6'8"	225	Freshman	Cleveland, OH	Transferred to Eastern Michigan
Timothy Ighoefe	5	C	7'0"	250	Junior	Lagos, Nigeria	Transferred to California Baptist
Chuma Azinge	10	G	6'3"	183	Junior	San Marino, CA	Entered transfer portal; not selected
Kaiden Rice	11	G/F	6'7"	215	Graduate Student	Columbia, SC	Completed eligibility
Donald Carey	13	G	6'5"	187	Senior	Upper Marlboro, MD	Transferred to Maryland
Colin Holloway	23	F	6'6"	220	Sophomore	Baton Rouge, LA	Transferred to Tulane
Kobe Clark	24	F	6'6"	180	Sophomore	St. Louis, MO	Transferred to Southeast Missouri State
Malcolm Wilson	32	C	7'0"	205	RS Sr	Columbia, SC	Became team manager

NOTE: Early in the 2022–2023 season, Malcolm Wilson returned to the roster as a player.

=== Incoming transfers ===
Name	Number	Pos.	Height	Weight	Year	Hometown	Previous school
Brandon Murray	0	SG/F	6'5"	214	Sophomore	Baltimore, MD	LSU
Amir "Primo" Spears	1	G	6'3"	185	Sophomore	Hartford, CT	Duquesne
Jay Heath	5	G	6'3"	185	Junior	Washington, DC	Arizona State
Akok Akok	11	F	6'9"	205	Junior	Manchester, NH	UConn
Bryson Mozone	15	G/F	6'6"	200	Graduate Student	North Augusta, SC	USC Upstate
Bradley Ezewiro	22	F/C	6'8"	246	Sophomore	Torrance, CA	LSU
Qudus Wahab	34	C	6'11"	240	Senior	Lagos, Nigeria	Maryland

NOTE: Qudus Wahab previously played for Georgetown during the 2019–2020 and 2020–2021 seasons.

=== 2022 recruiting class ===
College recruiting information
Name	Hometown	School	Height	Weight	Commit date
Denver Anglin; CG	Montclair, NJ	Gill St. Bernard's School	6 ft 2 in (1.88 m)	165 lb (75 kg)	Jul 28, 2021
Denver Anglin; CG	Recruit ratings: Rivals: 247Sports:				
D’Ante Bass; W	Savannah, GA	Windsor Forest High School	6 ft 7 in (2.01 m)	185 lb (84 kg)	Nov 5, 2021
D’Ante Bass; W	Recruit ratings: 247Sports:				
Overall recruit ranking:
Note: In many cases, Scout, Rivals, 247Sports, On3, and ESPN may conflict in their listings of height and weight.; In these cases, the average was taken. ESPN grades are on a 100-point scale.; Sources: "2022 Team Ranking". Rivals.

== Roster ==
2022–23 Georgetown Hoyas men's basketball team
Players
Coaches

Pos.	#	Name	Height	Weight	Year	Previous school	Hometown
F	0	Brandon Murray	6 ft 5 in (1.96 m)	214 lb (97 kg)	So	LSU	Baltimore, MD
G	1	Primo Spears	6 ft 3 in (1.91 m)	185 lb (84 kg)	So	Duquesne	Hartford, CT
G	2	Dante Harris	6 ft 0 in (1.83 m)	170 lb (77 kg)	Jr	Lakeway Christian Academy	Washington, D.C.
G	4	Denver Anglin	6 ft 2 in (1.88 m)	165 lb (75 kg)	Fr	Gill St. Bernard's School	Montclair, NJ
G	5	Jay Heath	6 ft 3 in (1.91 m)	195 lb (88 kg)	Sr	Arizona State	Washington, DC
F	11	Akok Akok	6 ft 9 in (2.06 m)	205 lb (93 kg)	Sr	UConn	Manchester, NH
G	12	Jordan Riley	6 ft 4 in (1.93 m)	195 lb (88 kg)	So	Brentwood HS	Brentwood, NY
G/F	15	Bryson Mozone	6 ft 6 in (1.98 m)	200 lb (91 kg)	Sr	USC Upstate	North Augusta, SC
C	21	Ryan Mutombo	7 ft 2 in (2.18 m)	252 lb (114 kg)	So	The Lovett School	Atlanta, GA
F	22	Bradley Ezewiro	6 ft 8 in (2.03 m)	246 lb (112 kg)	So	LSU	Torrance, CA
F	23	D'Ante Bass	6 ft 7 in (2.01 m)	185 lb (84 kg)	Fr	Windsor Forest HS	Savannah, GA
G	31	Wayne Bristol Jr.	6 ft 6 in (1.98 m)	205 lb (93 kg)	Sr	Howard	Upper Marlboro, MD
C	34	Qudus Wahab	6 ft 11 in (2.11 m)	240 lb (109 kg)	Sr	Maryland	Lagos, Nigeria
F	55	Victor Muresan (W)	6 ft 10 in (2.08 m)	190 lb (86 kg)	Jr	Georgetown Day School	Potomac, MD

Head coach

- Patrick Ewing (Georgetown)

Assistant coach(es)

- Patrick Baldwin (Northwestern)
- Kevin Nickelberry (Virginia Wesleyan)
- Clinton Crouch (Saint Francis)

Legend

- (C) Team captain
- (S) Suspended
- (I) Ineligible
- (W) Walk-on
- Injured
- Current redshirt

Roster

== Season recap ==
=== Non-conference season ===
Georgetown lost to Northwestern in the Gavitt Tipoff Games on November 15. It was the first meeting of the schools.

Georgetown participated in the 2022 Jamaica Classic at Montego Bay, Jamaica, November 18–20, 2022. The Hoyas lost to Loyola Marymount in the semifinal round, but defeated La Salle in the consolation game.

Georgetown participated in the Big East–Big 12 Battle, losing at Texas Tech on November 30, 2022.

Georgetown met South Carolina at Capital One Arena in the second year of a two-year home-and-home series that began in the 2021–2022 season. The Hoyas lost to the Gamecocks.

Georgetown played at Syracuse on December 10, 2022, and lost the game.

=== Conference season ===
Georgetown played a 20-game conference season, meeting each Big East opponent in a home-and-home series. The Hoyas finished in eleventh and last place, with a 2–18 record.

=== Big East tournament ===
The 2023 Big East tournament took place March 8–11, 2023, at Madison Square Garden in New York City. Seeded eleventh, Georgetown faced sixth-seeded Villanova in the first round and suffered a lopsided loss, finishing the season with an overall record of 7–25.

== Schedule and results ==
Date time, TV	Rank^{#}	Opponent^{#}	Result	Record	High points	High rebounds	High assists	Site (attendance) city, state
Non-conference regular season
November 8, 2022*; 8:30 p.m., FS1		Coppin State	W 99–89 ^{OT}	1–0	28 – Spears	12 – Akok	8 – Murray	Capital One Arena (7,125); Washington, D.C.
November 12, 2022*; 11:00 a.m., WDCA		Green Bay; Jamaica Classic campus game	W 92–58	2–0	21 – Spears	6 – Riley	7 – Murray	Capital One Arena (4,583); Washington, D.C.
November 15, 2022*; 6:30 p.m., FS1		Northwestern; Gavitt Tipoff Games	L 63–75	2–1	22 – Spears	7 – Akok/Wahab	6 – Spears	Capital One Arena (5,518); Washington, D.C.
November 18, 2022*; 4:30 p.m., CBSSN		vs. Loyola Marymount; Jamaica Classic Semifinal	L 66–84	2–2	19 – Murray	10 – Akok	3 – Spears	Montego Bay Convention Centre; Montego Bay, Jamaica
November 20, 2022*; 12:00 p.m., CBSSN		vs. La Salle; Jamaica Classic Consolation	W 69–62	3–2	23 – Wahab	10 – Akok	3 – Heath	Montego Bay Convention Centre; Montego Bay, Jamaica
November 23, 2022*; 11:30 a.m., FS2		American	L 70–74	3–3	15 – Spears	9 – Wahab	6 – Spears	Capital One Arena (3,267); Washington, D.C.
November 26, 2022*; 12:00 p.m., FS2		UMBC	W 79–70	4–3	25 – Heath	8 – Wahab	6 – Spears	Capital One Arena (4,134); Washington, D.C.
November 30, 2022*; 8:00 p.m., ESPN+		at Texas Tech; Big East–Big 12 Battle	L 65–79	4–4	18 – Mozone/Murray	6 – Akok	7 – Spears	United Supermarkets Arena (14,649); Lubbock, TX
December 3, 2022*; 12:00 p.m., FS1		South Carolina	L 71–74 ^{OT}	4–5	23 – Heath	9 – Wahab	5 – Murray	Capital One Arena (5,391); Washington, D.C.
December 7, 2022*; 6:30 p.m., FS2		Siena	W 75–68	5–5	20 – Murray	12 – Wahab	8 – Spears	Capital One Arena (3,526); Washington, D.C.
December 10, 2022*; 1:00 p.m., ABC		at Syracuse; Rivalry	L 64–83	5–6	22 – Spears	11 – Wahab	5 – Spears	JMA Wireless Dome (20,370); Syracuse, NY
Big East regular season
December 16, 2022; 6:30 p.m., FS1		Xavier	L 89–102	5–7 (0–1)	22 – Spears	7 – Wahab	6 – Murray	Capital One Arena (5,785); Washington, D.C.
December 20, 2022; 6:30 p.m., FS1		at No. 2 UConn; Rivalry	L 73–84	5–8 (0–2)	19 – Spears	9 – Wahab	3 – Murray/Spears	Harry A. Gampel Pavilion (10,167); Storrs, CT
December 29, 2022; 8:00 p.m., FS2		at DePaul	L 76–83	5–9 (0–3)	29 – Murray	16 – Wahab	11 – Spears	Wintrust Arena (4,097); Chicago, IL
January 1, 2023; 6:45 p.m., FS1		Butler	L 51–80	5–10 (0–4)	12 – Akok	9 – Akok	5 – Spears	Capital One Arena (6,140); Washington, D.C.
January 4, 2023; 6:30 p.m., FS1		Villanova	L 57–73	5–11 (0–5)	12 – Riley	10 – Akok	9 – Spears	Capital One Arena (7,203); Washington, D.C.
January 7, 2023; 2:10 p.m., FS1		at Marquette	L 73–95	5–12 (0–6)	18 – Spears	7 – Akok/Wahab	7 – Spears	Fiserv Forum (15,454); Milwaukee, WI
January 10, 2023; 8:42 p.m., FS1		Seton Hall	L 51–66	5–13 (0–7)	9 – Akok/Riley/Spears	10 – Wahab	2 – Bristol/Mozone/Spears	Capital One Arena (4,189); Washington, D.C.
January 16, 2023; 12:08 p.m., FOX		at Villanova	L 73–77	5–14 (0–8)	19 – Spears	7 – Ezewiro	7 – Spears	Finneran Pavilion (6,501); Villanova, PA
January 21, 2023; 12:00 p.m., FS1		at No. 8 Xavier	L 82–95	5–15 (0–9)	37 – Spears	10 – Akok	11 – Spears	Cintas Center (10,383); Cincinnati, OH
January 24, 2023; 7:00 p.m., FS1		DePaul	W 81–76	6–15 (1–9)	21 – Spears	10 – Wahab	6 – Spears	Capital One Arena (3,724); Washington, D.C.
January 29, 2023; 2:10 p.m., FS1		at St. John's; Rivalry	L 73–75	6–16 (1–10)	25 – Spears	7 – Akok/Wahab	2 – Akok/Murray/Spears	Madison Square Garden (11,455); New York, NY
February 1, 2023; 6:36 p.m., CBSSN		Creighton	L 53–63	6–17 (1–11)	14 – Wahab	8 – Murray	4 – Spears	Capital One Arena (4,042); Washington, D.C.
February 4, 2023; 12:00 p.m., FS1		No. 24 UConn; Rivalry	L 62–68	6–18 (1–12)	21 – Murray	6 – Wahab	5 – Spears	Capital One Arena (10,621); Washington, D.C.
February 8, 2023; 8:00 p.m., CBSSN		at No. 20 Providence	L 62–74	6–19 (1–13)	19 – Ezewiro	7 – Murray	7 – Spears	Amica Mutual Pavilion (11,892); Providence, RI
February 11, 2023; 12:00 p.m., FS1		No. 10 Marquette	L 75–89	6–20 (1–14)	18 – Heath	9 – Ezewiro	8 – Spears	Capital One Arena (7,111); Washington, D.C.
February 14, 2023; 6:05 p.m., CBSSN		at Seton Hall	L 68–76	6–21 (1–15)	16 – Spears	8 – Akok/Murray	5 – Spears	Prudential Center (8,812); Newark, NJ
February 19, 2023; 3:00 p.m., FS1		at Butler	W 68–62	7–21 (2–15)	17 – Murray	8 – Mozone/Wahab	4 – Spears	Hinkle Fieldhouse (8,615); Indianapolis, IN
February 22, 2023; 9:10 p.m., CBSSN		St. John's; Rivalry	L 70–79	7–22 (2–16)	25 – Murray	12 – Wahab	7 – Heath	Capital One Arena (3,076); Washington, D.C.
February 26, 2023; 12:38 p.m., FOX		No. 20 Providence	L 68–88	7–23 (2–17)	26 – Spears	8 – Ezewiro	5 – Murray	Capital One Arena (7,085); Washington, D.C.
March 1, 2023; 8:45 p.m., FS1		at Creighton	L 59–99	7–24 (2–18)	21 – Spears	8 – Wahab	4 – Spears	CHI Health Center Omaha (17,039); Omaha, NE
Big East tournament
March 8, 2023; 8:15 p.m., FS1	(11)	vs. (6) Villanova; First round	L 48–80	7–25	17 – Spears	8 – Heath	7 – Spears	Madison Square Garden (19,812); New York, NY
*Non-conference game. ^{#}Rankings from AP Poll. (#) Tournament seedings in parentheses. All times are in Eastern Time.
