= 2022–23 Seton Hall Pirates men's basketball team =

American college basketball season

2022–23 Seton Hall Pirates men's basketball

NIT, First Round
- Conference: Big East Conference
- Record: 17–16 (10–10 Big East)
- Head coach: Shaheen Holloway (1st season)
- Assistant coaches: Rasheen Davis; Rylan Whalen; Corey Lowery
- Home arena: Prudential Center; Walsh Gymnasium

2022–23 Big East men's basketball standings
	Conf.				Overall
Team	W		L	PCT	W		L	PCT
No. 6 Marquette †	17	–	3	.850	29	–	7	.806
No. 13 Xavier	15	–	5	.750	27	–	10	.730
Creighton	14	–	6	.700	24	–	13	.649
No. 10 UConn	13	–	7	.650	31	–	8	.795
Providence	13	–	7	.650	21	–	12	.636
Villanova	10	–	10	.500	17	–	17	.500
Seton Hall	10	–	10	.500	17	–	16	.515
St. John's	7	–	13	.350	18	–	15	.545
Butler	6	–	14	.300	14	–	18	.438
DePaul	3	–	17	.150	10	–	23	.303
Georgetown	2	–	18	.100	7	–	25	.219
† 2023 Big East tournament winner Rankings from AP poll

The 2022–23 Seton Hall Pirates men's basketball team represented Seton Hall University in the 2022–23 NCAA Division I men's basketball season. They were led by first-year head coach Shaheen Holloway. The Pirates played their home games at the Prudential Center in Newark, New Jersey and Walsh Gymnasium in South Orange, New Jersey as members of the Big East Conference. They finished the season 17–14, 10–10 in Big East play to finish in a tie for sixth place. They were defeated by DePaul in the first round of the Big East tournament. The Pirates received an at-large bid to the National Invitation Tournament (NIT), where they lost in the first round to Colorado.

== Previous season ==
The Pirates finished the 2021–22 season 21–11, 11–8 in Big East play to finish in sixth place. They defeated Georgetown in the first round of the Big East Tournament before losing to UConn. They received an at-large bid to the NCAA tournament as the No. 8 seed in the South region where they lost in the First Round to TCU.

On March 21, 2022, head coach Kevin Willard left to the school to coach Maryland. On March 30, the school named former player Shaheen Holloway as the team's new head coach. He previously coached for Saint Peter's and was an assistant coach for Seton Hall from 2010 to 2018.

== Offseason ==
=== Departures ===
Name	Number	Pos.	Height	Weight	Year	Hometown	Reason for departure
Bryce Aiken	1	G	6'0"	180	Senior	Randolph, New Jersey	Graduated
Jared Rhoden	14	G, F	6'6"	210	Senior	Baldwin, New York	Declared for the 2022 NBA draft; undrafted; signed with the Portland Trail Blazers
Myles Cale	22	G, F	6'6"	210	Senior	Middletown, Delaware	Graduated
Ryan Conway	23	G	6'1"	180	Senior	Baltimore, Maryland	Transferred to Towson
Jahari Long	25	G	6'5"	200	Sophomore	Houston, Texas	Transferred to Maryland
Tyler Powell	33	G, F	6'5"	220	Freshman	Los Angeles, California	Transferred to Nevada
Brandon Weston	20	G, F	6'5"	200	Freshman	Brooklyn, New York	Transferred to Rhode Island

=== Incoming transfers ===
Name	Number	Pos.	Height	Weight	Year	Hometown	Previous School
KC Ndefo	13	F	6'7"	206	Graduate	Elmont, New York	Graduate transfer from Saint Peters.
Femi Odukale	21	G	6'6"	205	Junior	Brooklyn, New York	Transferred from Pittsburgh.
Al-Amir Dawes	2	G	6'2"	180	Senior	Newark, New Jersey	Transferred from Clemson.
Dre Davis	14	G, F	6'6"	212	Junior	Indianapolis, Indiana	Transferred from Louisville.
Abdou Ndiaye	33	F	6'9"	200	(redshirt) Senior	Louga, Senegal	Transferred from Illinois State.

=== 2022 recruiting class ===
College recruiting
Name	Hometown	School	Height	Weight	Commit date
Jaquan Sanders; SG	Bronx, New York	Our Saviour Lutheran School	6 ft 3 in (1.91 m)	170 lb (77 kg)	Nov 5, 2021
Jaquan Sanders; SG	Recruit ratings: Rivals: 247Sports: ESPN: (80)				
Tae Davis; SF	Indianapolis, Indiana	Warren Central	6 ft 7 in (2.01 m)	198 lb (90 kg)	Apr 29, 2022
Tae Davis; SF	Recruit ratings: 247Sports:				
Jaquan Harris; G	North Brunswick, New Jersey	St. Thomas Aquinas	6 ft 3 in (1.91 m)	180 lb (82 kg)	Mar 23, 2021
Jaquan Harris; G	Recruit ratings: Rivals: 247Sports: ESPN: (81)				

== Roster ==
2022–23 Seton Hall Pirates men's basketball team
Players
Coaches

Pos.	#	Name	Height	Weight	Year	Previous school	Hometown
G	0	Kadary Richmond	6 ft 6 in (1.98 m)	200 lb (91 kg)	Jr	Syracuse	Brooklyn, New York
F	1	Tray Jackson	6 ft 10 in (2.08 m)	210 lb (95 kg)	Sr	Missouri	Detroit, Michigan
G	2	Al-Amir Dawes	6 ft 2 in (1.88 m)	180 lb (82 kg)	Sr	Clemson	Newark, New Jersey
F	4	Tyrese Samuel	6 ft 10 in (2.08 m)	230 lb (104 kg)	Sr	Orangeville Prep	Montreal, Quebec
F	10	Alexis Yetna	6 ft 8 in (2.03 m)	225 lb (102 kg)	GS	South Florida	Paris, France
F	13	KC Ndefo	6 ft 7 in (2.01 m)	206 lb (93 kg)	GS	Saint Peters	Elmont, New York
G/F	14	Dre Davis	6 ft 6 in (1.98 m)	212 lb (96 kg)	Jr	Louisville	Indianapolis, Indiana
G	15	Jamir Harris	6 ft 2 in (1.88 m)	195 lb (88 kg)	GS	American	North Brunswick, New Jersey
G	20	Jaquan Sanders	6 ft 4 in (1.93 m)	205 lb (93 kg)	Fr	Our Saviour Lutheran School	Queens, New York
G	21	Femi Odukale	6 ft 6 in (1.98 m)	205 lb (93 kg)	Jr	Pittsburgh	Brooklyn, New York
F	22	Tae Davis	6 ft 9 in (2.06 m)	204 lb (93 kg)	Fr	Warren Central High School	Indianapolis, Indiana
G	23	Jaquan Harris	6 ft 3 in (1.91 m)	183 lb (83 kg)	Fr	St. Thomas Aquianas High School	North Brunswick, New Jersey
F	33	Abdou Ndiaye (redshirt)	6 ft 9 in (2.06 m)	200 lb (91 kg)	Sr	Illinois State	Louga, Senegal
G	41	David Gabriel (W)	6 ft 1 in (1.85 m)	160 lb (73 kg)	Fr	North Bergen High School	North Bergen, New Jersey
G	43	Jorge Mercado (W)	6 ft 4 in (1.93 m)	215 lb (98 kg)	Jr	Columbia Secondary School	The Bronx, New York
F	50	Elijah Muhammad (W)	6 ft 10 in (2.08 m)	189 lb (86 kg)	Fr	Academy of the New Church	Queens, New York

Head coach

- Shaheen Holloway (Seton Hall)

Assistant coach(es)

- Rasheen Davis (New Rochelle)
- Rylan Whalen (Saint Joseph's)
- Corey Lowery (Rutgers)

Legend

- (C) Team captain
- (S) Suspended
- (I) Ineligible
- (W) Walk-on
- Injured
- Current redshirt

Roster
Last update: November 15, 2022

== Schedule and results ==
Date time, TV	Rank^{#}	Opponent^{#}	Result	Record	High points	High rebounds	High assists	Site (attendance) city, state
Non-conference regular season
November 9, 2022*; 8:00 p.m., FS1		Monmouth	W 79–52	1–0	12 – Jackson	8 – Tied	3 – Harris	Prudential Center (8,626); Newark, NJ
November 12, 2022*; 8:00 p.m., FS2		Saint Peter's	W 80–44	2–0	13 – Tied	11 – Dawes	2 – Tied	Prudential Center (9,488); Newark, NJ
November 16, 2022*; 7:30 p.m., FS1		Iowa; Gavitt Tipoff Games	L 67–83	2–1	13 – Davis	8 – Samuel	3 – Tied	Prudential Center (8,933); Newark, NJ
November 20, 2022*; 3:00 p.m., FS1		Wagner	W 82–44	3–1	19 – Dawes	8 – Samuel	3 – Tied	Prudential Center (8,811); Newark, NJ
November 24, 2022*; 7:30 p.m., ESPNews		vs. Memphis; ESPN Events Invitational Quarterfinals	W 70–69	4–1	14 – Samuel	11 – Samuel	5 – Tied	State Farm Field House (1,621); Orlando, FL
November 25, 2022*; 8:00 p.m., ESPN2		vs. Oklahoma; ESPN Events Invitational Semifinals	L 64–77	4–2	12 – Dawes	7 – Richmond	5 – Richmond	State Farm Field House (1,396); Orlando, FL
November 27, 2022*; 5:00 p.m., ESPN2		vs. Siena; ESPN Events Invitational 3rd Place Game	L 55–60	4–3	15 – Dawes	7 – Tied	4 – Richmond	State Farm Field House; Orlando, FL
December 1, 2022*; 9:00 p.m., ESPN		at No. 9 Kansas; Big East–Big 12 Battle	L 65–91	4–4	17 – Richmond	5 – Tied	5 – Richmond	Allen Fieldhouse (16,300); Lawrence, KS
December 7, 2022*; 8:30 p.m., FS2		Lincoln	W 82–55	5–4	17 – Ndefo	14 – Samuel	4 – Harris	Walsh Gymnasium (1,159); South Orange, NJ
December 11, 2022*; 6:30 p.m., FS1		at Rutgers; Rivalry/Garden State Hardwood Classic	W 45–43	6–4	10 – Davis	8 – Ndefo	2 – Tied	Jersey Mike's Arena (8,500); Piscataway, NJ
December 14, 2022*; 7:00 p.m., FS1		Drexel	W 66–49	7–4	12 – Tied	9 – Richmond	4 – Richmond	Prudential Center (8,433); Newark, NJ
Big East regular season
December 17, 2022; 12:00 p.m., FOX		Providence	L 67–71	7–5 (0–1)	28 – Richmond	9 – Richmond	5 – Richmond	Prudential Center (10,147); Newark, NJ
December 20, 2022; 8:30 p.m., FS1		at Xavier	L 70–73	7–6 (0–2)	17 – Richmond	9 – Odukale	5 – Richmond	Cintas Center (10,224); Cincinnati, OH
December 27, 2022; 8:00 p.m., FS1		at Marquette	L 69–83	7–7 (0–3)	15 – Davis	9 – Ndefo	5 – Richmond	Fiserv Forum (14,806); Milwaukee, WI
December 31, 2022; 12:00 p.m., FS1		St. John's	W 88–66	8–7 (1–3)	22 – Dawes	9 – Tied	6 – Richmond	Prudential Center (10,481); Newark, NJ
January 3, 2023; 8:30 p.m., FS1		at Creighton	L 61–83	8–8 (1–4)	16 – Odukale	6 – Samuel	2 – Jam. Harris	CHI Health Center Omaha (16,592); Omaha, NE
January 7, 2023; 8:30 p.m., FS1		Butler	W 76–51	9–8 (2–4)	19 – Samuel	8 – Richmond	9 – Richmond	Prudential Center (9,033); Newark, NJ
January 10, 2023; 8:42 p.m., FS1		at Georgetown	W 66–51	10–8 (3–4)	24 – Dawes	9 – Odukale	6 – Richmond	Capital One Arena (4,189); Washington, D.C.
January 14, 2023; 12:00 p.m., FS1		at DePaul	W 71–67	11–8 (4–4)	16 – Ndefo	12 – Ndefo	4 – Richmond	Wintrust Arena (4,502); Chicago, IL
January 18, 2023; 6:30 p.m., FS1		No. 15 UConn	W 67–66	12–8 (5–4)	18 – Richmond	10 – Richmond	3 – Odukale	Prudential Center (9,710); Newark, NJ
January 21, 2023; 4:00 p.m., CBSSN		No. 20 Marquette	L 53–74	12–9 (5–5)	10 – Richmond	5 – Tied	5 – Richmond	Prudential Center (9,796); Newark, NJ
January 28, 2023; 4:00 p.m., FS1		at Butler	W 70–49	13–9 (6–5)	15 – D. Davis	6 – T. Davis	5 – Richmond	Hinkle Fieldhouse (9,100); Indianapolis, IN
February 1, 2023; 8:30 p.m., CBSSN		at St. John's	W 84–72	14–9 (7–5)	21 – Dawes	13 – Richmond	7 – Richmond	Carnesecca Arena (4,977); Queens, NY
February 5, 2023; 12:00 p.m., FS1		DePaul	W 69–64	15–9 (8–5)	14 – Tied	7 – Samuel	4 – Richmond	Prudential Center (9,770); Newark, NJ
February 8, 2023; 6:30 p.m., FS1		No. 23 Creighton	L 62–75	15–10 (8–6)	19 – Dawes	3 – Tied	3 – Dawes	Prudential Center (8,875); Newark, NJ
February 11, 2023; 8:00 p.m., FS1		at Villanova	L 54–58	15–11 (8–7)	14 – Samuel	10 – Samuel	9 – Richmond	Wells Fargo Center (15,015); Philadelphia, PA
February 14, 2023; 6:05 p.m., CBSSN		Georgetown	W 76–68	16–11 (9–7)	20 – Dawes	10 – Tied	4 – Odukale	Prudential Center (8,812); Newark, NJ
February 18, 2023; 12:00 p.m., FOX		at No. 20 UConn	L 55–64	16–12 (9–8)	16 – Tied	5 – Ndefo	2 – Tied	Harry A. Gampel Pavilion (10,167); Storrs, CT
February 24, 2023; 7:00 p.m., FS1		No. 16 Xavier	L 60–82	16–13 (9–9)	13 – Davis	5 – Davis	4 – Dawes	Prudential Center (10,481); Newark, NJ
February 28, 2023; 8:30 p.m., FS1		Villanova	L 72–76	16–14 (9–10)	21 – Dawes	10 – Odukale	6 – Odukale	Prudential Center (11,071); Newark, NJ
March 4, 2023; 12:00 p.m., FOX		at No. 20 Providence	W 82–58	17–14 (10–10)	24 – Davis	8 – Odukale	5 – Odukale	Amica Mutual Pavilion (11,589); Providence, RI
Big East tournament
March 8, 2023*; 5:30 p.m., FS1	(7)	vs. (10) DePaul; First round	L 65–66	17–15	16 – Samuel	12 – Samuel	3 – Tied	Madison Square Garden; New York City, NY
NIT tournament
March 14, 2023; 11:00 p.m., ESPN2		at (3) Colorado; First round – Rutgers bracket	L 64–65	17–16	18 – Ndefo	11 – Samuel	4 – Tied	CU Events Center (2,363); Boulder, CO
*Non-conference game. ^{#}Rankings from AP Poll. (#) Tournament seedings in parentheses. All times are in Eastern Time.

== Rankings ==
Ranking movements Legend: — = Not ranked
	Week																			
Poll	Pre	1	2	3	4	5	6	7	8	9	10	11	12	13	14	15	16	17	18	Final
AP	—																			Not released
Coaches																				
