= 2022–23 St. John's Red Storm men's basketball team =

American college basketball season

2022–23 St. John's Red Storm men's basketball

Empire Classic champions
- Conference: Big East Conference
- Record: 18–15 (7–13 Big East)
- Head coach: Mike Anderson (4th season)
- Associate head coach: T.J. Cleveland; Van Macon
- Assistant coach: Greg Vetrone
- Home arena: Carnesecca Arena; Madison Square Garden

2022–23 Big East men's basketball standings
	Conf.				Overall
Team	W		L	PCT	W		L	PCT
No. 6 Marquette †	17	–	3	.850	29	–	7	.806
No. 13 Xavier	15	–	5	.750	27	–	10	.730
Creighton	14	–	6	.700	24	–	13	.649
No. 10 UConn	13	–	7	.650	31	–	8	.795
Providence	13	–	7	.650	21	–	12	.636
Villanova	10	–	10	.500	17	–	17	.500
Seton Hall	10	–	10	.500	17	–	16	.515
St. John's	7	–	13	.350	18	–	15	.545
Butler	6	–	14	.300	14	–	18	.438
DePaul	3	–	17	.150	10	–	23	.303
Georgetown	2	–	18	.100	7	–	25	.219
† 2023 Big East tournament winner Rankings from AP poll

The 2022–23 St. John's Red Storm men's basketball team represented St. John's University during the 2022–23 NCAA Division I men's basketball season. They were coached by Mike Anderson, in his fourth year at the school, and played their home games at Carnesecca Arena and Madison Square Garden as members of the Big East Conference. They finished the season 17–14, 7–13 in Big East Play to finish in eighth place. They defeated Butler in the opening round of the Big East tournament before losing in the quarterfinals to Marquette.

On March 10, 2023, the school fired head coach Mike Anderson for cause. On March 20, the school named former Kentucky and Louisville head coach Rick Pitino the team's new head coach.

== Departures ==
Name	Number	Pos.	Height	Weight	Year	Hometown	Reason for departure
Aaron Wheeler	1	F	6'9"	205	GS Senior	Stamford, CT	Graduated
Julian Champagnie	2	G/F	6'8"	215	Junior	Brooklyn, NY	Declared for 2022 NBA draft; signed with the Philadelphia 76ers
Stef Smith	3	G	6'2"	195	GS Senior	Ajax, ON	Graduated
Tareq Coburn	10	G	6'5"	210	GS Senior	Queens, NY	Graduated
Artemios Gavalas	14	G	6'0"	180	Sophomore	Southampon, NY	Walk-on; transferred
Jalen Rosemond	34	F	6'8"	220	Senior	Merrick, NY	Walk-on; graduate transferred to Molloy

== Incoming transfers ==
Name	Num	Pos	Height	Weight	Year	Hometown	Previous school
André Curbelo	5	G	6'1"	175	Junior	Vega Baja, Puerto Rico	Illinois (2 yrs immediate eligibility)
David Jones	23	F	6'6"	195	Junior	Santo Domingo, Dominican Republic	DePaul (2 yrs immediate eligibility)

== Recruiting classes ==
=== 2022 recruiting class ===
College recruiting information
Name	Hometown	School	Height	Weight	Commit date
AJ Storr #25 SF	Las Vegas, NV	IMG Academy	6 ft 6 in (1.98 m)	220 lb (100 kg)	Aug 4, 2021
AJ Storr #25 SF	Recruit ratings: Rivals: 247Sports: ESPN: (82)				
Kolby King #65 PG	Pembroke Pines, FL	Pembroke Pines Charter School	6 ft 2 in (1.88 m)	170 lb (77 kg)	Aug 2, 2021
Kolby King #65 PG	Recruit ratings: Rivals: ESPN: (77)				
Mohamed Keita; C	Africa	The Winchendon School	7 ft 1 in (2.16 m)	N/A	May 17, 2022
Mohamed Keita; C	Recruit ratings: No ratings found				
Overall recruit ranking:
Note: In many cases, Scout, Rivals, 247Sports, On3, and ESPN may conflict in their listings of height and weight.; In these cases, the average was taken. ESPN grades are on a 100-point scale.; Sources: "2022 Team Ranking". Rivals.

=== 2023 recruiting class ===
College recruiting information (2023)
Name	Hometown	School	Height	Weight	Commit date
Brandon Gardner #17 PF	Middle Village, NY	Christ the King High School	6 ft 7 in (2.01 m)	210 lb (95 kg)	Jun 26, 2022
Brandon Gardner #17 PF	Recruit ratings: Rivals: 247Sports: ESPN: (82)				
Overall recruit ranking:
Note: In many cases, Scout, Rivals, 247Sports, On3, and ESPN may conflict in their listings of height and weight.; In these cases, the average was taken. ESPN grades are on a 100-point scale.; Sources: "2023 Team Ranking". Rivals.

== Roster ==
2022–23 St. John's Red Storm men's basketball team
Players
Coaches

Pos.	#	Name	Height	Weight	Year	Previous school	Hometown
G	0	Posh Alexander	6 ft 0 in (1.83 m)	200 lb (91 kg)	Jr	Our Savior Lutheran	Brooklyn, NY
G	2	AJ Storr	6 ft 6 in (1.98 m)	200 lb (91 kg)	Fr	IMG Academy	Rockford, IL
G	3	André Curbelo	6 ft 1 in (1.85 m)	175 lb (79 kg)	Jr	Illinois	Vega Baja, PR
F	4	O'Mar Stanley	6 ft 8 in (2.03 m)	230 lb (104 kg)	So	Link Year Prep	Overland Park, KS
G	5	Dylan Addae-Wusu	6 ft 4 in (1.93 m)	230 lb (104 kg)	Jr	Our Saviour Lutheran	The Bronx, NY
G	10	Montez Mathis (injured)	6 ft 4 in (1.93 m)	210 lb (95 kg)	RS Sr	Rutgers	Baltimore, MD
F	11	Joel Soriano	6 ft 11 in (2.11 m)	260 lb (118 kg)	Sr	Fordham	Yonkers, NY
G	12	Kolby King	6 ft 2 in (1.88 m)	175 lb (79 kg)	Fr	Pembroke Pines Charter	Pembroke Pines, FL
G	13	Jason Simpson (W)	5 ft 10 in (1.78 m)	155 lb (70 kg)	So	Montverde Academy	West Palm Beach, FL
G	14	Parker Williams (W)	6 ft 0 in (1.83 m)	180 lb (82 kg)	Fr	IMG Academy	Birmingham, AL
F	22	Esahia Nyiwe	6 ft 10 in (2.08 m)	220 lb (100 kg)	Sr	Clarendon College	Omaha, NE
F	23	David Jones	6 ft 6 in (1.98 m)	210 lb (95 kg)	Jr	DePaul	Santo Domingo, DR
G	24	Rafael Pinzon	6 ft 6 in (1.98 m)	195 lb (88 kg)	So	Long Island Lutheran	Arecibo, PR
C	34	Mohamed Keita	7 ft 1 in (2.16 m)	220 lb (100 kg)	Fr	The Winchendon School	Conakry, Guinea
F	55	Drissa Traore	6 ft 8 in (2.03 m)	215 lb (98 kg)	RS Fr	Long Island Lutheran	New York City, NY

Head coach

- Mike Anderson (Tulsa)

Assistant coach(es)

- T.J. Cleveland (Arkansas)
- Van Macon (Southampton)
- Greg Vetrone (LIU Post)

Legend

- (C) Team captain
- (S) Suspended
- (I) Ineligible
- (W) Walk-on
- Injured
- Current redshirt

Roster

== Schedule and results ==
Date time, TV	Rank^{#}	Opponent^{#}	Result	Record	High points	High rebounds	High assists	Site (attendance) city, state
Exhibition
October 26, 2022*; 7:00 p.m., ESPN3		Adelphi	W 85-55		13 – Storr	8 – Tied	10 – Alexander	Carnesecca Arena (3,169); Queens, NY
October 29, 2022*; 6:00 p.m., ESPN3		Southern New Hampshire	W 82–41		14 – Soriano	8 – Tied	5 – Curbelo	Carnesecca Arena (3,045); Queens, NY
Regular season
November 7, 2022*; 6:45 p.m., FS1		Merrimack	W 97–72	1–0	21 – Jones	11 – Soriano	7 – Curbelo	Carnesecca Arena (4,505); Queens, NY
November 12, 2022*; 6:00 p.m., FS2		Lafayette	W 83–68	2–0	20 – Jones	10 – Soriano	6 – Tied	Carnesecca Arena (3,611); Queens, NY
November 15, 2022*; 7:00 p.m., FS2		Central Connecticut	W 91–74	3–0	16 – Storr	9 – Jones	6 – Alexander	Carnesecca Arena (3,304); Queens, NY
November 17, 2022*; 6:30 p.m., FS1		Nebraska; Gavitt Tipoff Games	W 70–50	4–0	17 – Soriano	18 – Soriano	7 – Curbelo	Carnesecca Arena (3,933); Queens, NY
November 21, 2022*; 9:30 p.m., ESPNU		vs. Temple; Empire Classic semifinals	W 78–72	5–0	16 – Mathis	12 – Soriano	6 – Alexander	Barclays Center (6,755); Brooklyn, NY
November 22, 2022*; 9:30 p.m., ESPN2		vs. Syracuse; Empire Classic championship	W 76–69 ^{OT}	6–0	23 – Curbelo	14 – Soriano	6 – Tied	Barclays Center (5,901); Brooklyn, NY
November 26, 2022*; 2:00 p.m., FS2		Niagara	W 78–70	7–0	21 – Soriano	19 – Soriano	3 – Curbelo	Carnesecca Arena (3,437); Queens, NY
November 29, 2022*; 6:30 p.m., FS1		LIU	W 95–68	8–0	18 – Curbelo	10 – Soriano	8 – Alexander	Carnesecca Arena (3,901); Queens, NY
December 4, 2022*; 3:00 p.m., ESPN2		at No. 23 Iowa State; Big East–Big 12 Battle	L 60–71	8–1	14 – Alexander	12 – Soriano	2 – Tied	Hilton Coliseum (13,377); Ames, IA
December 7, 2022; 6:30 p.m., FS1		DePaul	W 86–67	9–1 (1–0)	17 – Soriano	14 – Soriano	6 – Alexander	Carnesecca Arena (4,285); Queens, NY
December 10, 2022*; 6:00 p.m., FS2		New Hampshire	W 64–51	10–1	20 – Jones	14 – Soriano	4 – Alexander	Carnesecca Arena (3,937); Queens, NY
December 17, 2022*; 2:30 p.m., MSG		vs. Florida State; Orange Bowl Basketball Classic	W 93–79	11–1	23 – Soriano	12 – Soriano	7 – Curbelo	FLA Live Arena (6,987); Sunrise, FL
December 21, 2022; 6:30 p.m., FS1		at Villanova	L 63–78	11–2 (1–1)	17 – Soriano	13 – Soriano	5 – Tied	Finneran Pavilion (6,501); Villanova, PA
December 28, 2022; 9:00 p.m., FS1		No. 22 Xavier	L 79–84	11–3 (1–2)	19 – Jones	10 – Jones	7 – Curbelo	Carnesecca Arena (4,368); Queens, NY
December 31, 2022; 12:00 p.m., FS1		at Seton Hall	L 66–88	11–4 (1–3)	23 – Soriano	11 – Soriano	7 – Curbelo	Prudential Center (10,481); Newark, NJ
January 3, 2023; 6:30 p.m., FS1		Marquette	L 85–96	11–5 (1–4)	22 – Soriano	13 – Soriano	5 – Tied	Carnesecca Arena (3,770); Queens, NY
January 7, 2023; 12:00 p.m., FS1		at Providence	L 80–83	11–6 (1–5)	16 – Soriano	10 – Soriano	4 – Curbelo	Amica Mutual Pavilion (12,401); Providence, RI
January 10, 2023; 6:30 p.m., FS1		Butler	W 77–61	12–6 (2–5)	20 – Soriano	10 – Soriano	6 – Curbelo	Carnesecca Arena (3,536); Queens, NY
January 15, 2023; 12:00 p.m., FS1		at No. 6 UConn	W 85–74	13–6 (3–5)	19 – Soriano	13 – Soriano	3 – Tied	XL Center (15,564); Hartford, CT
January 20, 2023; 7:00 p.m., FS1		Villanova	L 49–57	13–7 (3–6)	14 – Soriano	16 – Soriano	4 – Addae-Wusu	Madison Square Garden (13,504); New York, NY
January 25, 2023; 9:00 p.m., CBSSN		at Creighton	L 76–104	13–8 (3–7)	23 – Storr	9 – Soriano	3 – Curbelo	CHI Health Center Omaha (17,004); Omaha, NE
January 29, 2023; 2:10 p.m., FS1		Georgetown; Rivalry	W 75–73	14–8 (4–7)	17 – Jones	15 – Soriano	5 – Storr	Madison Square Garden (11,455); New York, NY
February 1, 2023; 8:30 p.m., CBSSN		Seton Hall	L 72–84	14–9 (4–8)	15 – Storr	10 – Soriano	4 – Alexander	Carnesecca Arena (4,977); Queens, NY
February 4, 2023; 5:00 p.m., FOX		at No. 16 Xavier	L 71–96	14–10 (4–9)	14 – Tied	8 – Soriano	4 – Soriano	Cintas Center (10,436); Cincinnati, OH
February 7, 2023; 8:30 p.m., FS1		at Butler	L 66–68	14–11 (4–10)	17 – Alexander	12 – Soriano	6 – Alexander	Hinkle Fieldhouse (6,894); Indianapolis, IN
February 11, 2023; 12:00 p.m., FOX		No. 20 Providence; Johnnies Day	W 73–68	15–11 (5–10)	16 – Jones	13 – Soriano	9 – Alexander	Madison Square Garden (10,210); New York, NY
February 14, 2023; 9:00 p.m., FS1		at DePaul	W 92–83 ^{2OT}	16–11 (6–10)	24 – Addae-Wusu	16 – Soriano	7 – Alexander	Wintrust Arena (3,018); Chicago, IL
February 18, 2023; 7:30 p.m., FS1		No. 18 Creighton	L 67–77	16–12 (6–11)	15 – Soriano	8 – Soriano	6 – Alexander	Carnesecca Arena (5,602); Queens, NY
February 22, 2023; 9:00 p.m., CBSSN		at Georgetown; Rivalry	W 79–70	17–12 (7–11)	16 – Soriano	12 – Jones	5 – Addae-Wusu	Capital One Arena (3,076); Washington, D.C.
February 25, 2023; 12:00 p.m., CBS		No. 18 UConn	L 86–95	17–13 (7–12)	20 – Storr	11 – Soriano	5 – Alexander	Madison Square Garden (12,241); New York, NY
March 4, 2023; 2:00 p.m., FOX		at No. 6 Marquette	L 94–96	17–14 (7–13)	25 – Addae-Wusu	11 – Soriano	5 – Addae-Wusu	Fiserv Forum (18,012); Milwaukee, WI
Big East tournament
March 8, 2023; 3:00 p.m., FS1	(8)	vs. (9) Butler; First round	W 76–63	18–14	19 – Soriano	15 – Soriano	4 – Addae-Wusu	Madison Square Garden (19,812); New York, NY
March 9, 2023; 12:00 p.m., FS1	(8)	vs. (1) No. 6 Marquette; Quarterfinals	L 70–72 ^{OT}	18–15	16 – Tied	12 – Soriano	2 – Tied	Madison Square Garden (19,812); New York, NY
*Non-conference game. ^{#}Rankings from AP Poll. (#) Tournament seedings in parentheses. All times are in Eastern Time.

== Awards and honors ==
Preseason honors
Honors	Player	Position	Date awarded	Ref.
Preseason All-Big East First Team	Posh Alexander	G	October 18, 2023	

Weekly honors
Honors	Player	Position	Date awarded	Ref.
Big East Men's Basketball Player of the Week	Joel Soriano	C	November 28, 2022	
Big East Men's Basketball Freshman of the Week	A.J. Storr	G/F	January 16, 2023	
Big East Men's Basketball Freshman of the Week	A.J. Storr	G/F	January 30, 2023	
Big East Men's Basketball Freshman of the Week	A.J. Storr	G/F	February 20, 2023	

Postseason honors
Honors	Player	Position	Date awarded	Ref.
All-Big East Second Team	Joel Soriano	C	March 5, 2023	
All-Big East Freshman Team	A.J. Storr	G/F	March 5, 2023	
Big East Most Improved Player	Joel Soriano	C	March 6, 2023	
All-Met First Team	Joel Soriano	C	April 26, 2023	
All-Met Third Team	Posh Alexander	G	April 26, 2023	
MBWA Rookie of the Year	A.J. Storr	G/F	April 26, 2023	

== Rankings ==
Ranking movements Legend: ██ Increase in ranking ██ Decrease in ranking — = Not ranked RV = Received votes
	Week																				
Poll	Pre	1	2	3	4	5	6	7	8	9	10	11	12	13	14	15	16	17	18	19	Final
AP	—	—	—	RV																	
Coaches	—	—	RV																		

*No rankings released
