= 2022–23 Butler Bulldogs men's basketball team =

2022–23 Butler Bulldogs men's basketball
- Conference: Big East Conference
- Record: 14–18 (6–14 Big East)
- Head coach: Thad Matta (1st, 2nd overall season)
- Assistant coaches: Mike Pegues (1st season); Kevin Kuwik (1st season); Maurice Joseph (1st season)
- Home arena: Hinkle Fieldhouse

2022–23 Big East men's basketball standings
	Conf.				Overall
Team	W		L	PCT	W		L	PCT
No. 6 Marquette †	17	–	3	.850	29	–	7	.806
No. 13 Xavier	15	–	5	.750	27	–	10	.730
Creighton	14	–	6	.700	24	–	13	.649
No. 10 UConn	13	–	7	.650	31	–	8	.795
Providence	13	–	7	.650	21	–	12	.636
Villanova	10	–	10	.500	17	–	17	.500
Seton Hall	10	–	10	.500	17	–	16	.515
St. John's	7	–	13	.350	18	–	15	.545
Butler	6	–	14	.300	14	–	18	.438
DePaul	3	–	17	.150	10	–	23	.303
Georgetown	2	–	18	.100	7	–	25	.219
† 2023 Big East tournament winner Rankings from AP poll

The 2022–23 Butler Bulldogs men's basketball team represented Butler University in the 2022–23 NCAA Division I men's basketball season. They were coached by Thad Matta, in the first year of his second stint as head coach of his alma mater. The Bulldogs played their home games at Hinkle Fieldhouse in Indianapolis, Indiana as members of the Big East Conference. They finished the season 14–18, 6–14 in Big East play to finish in ninth place. They were defeated by St. John's in the first round of the Big East tournament.

== Previous season ==
The Bulldogs finished the 2021–22 season 14–19, 6–14 in Big East play to finish in ninth place. They defeated Xavier in the first round of the Big East tournament before losing to Providence in the quarterfinals.

On April 1, 2022, the school fired head coach LaVall Jordan. Two days later, the school named Thad Matta the team's new head coach. Matta previously was the head coach at Ohio State and Xavier and was the head coach at Butler for the 2000–01 season.

== Offseason ==
=== Departures ===
Name	Number	Pos.	Height	Weight	Year	Hometown	Reason for departure
Bo Hodges	1	G/F	6'5"	210	RS Senior	Nashville, TN	Graduated
Aaron Thompson	2	G	6'2"	190	Graduate Student	Glenn Dale, MD	Graduated
Bryce Nze	10	F	6'7"	235	Graduate Student	Hartland, WI	Graduated
Jair Bolden	52	G	6'3"	220	Graduate Student	Brooklyn, NY	Graduated
Christian David	25	F	6'6"	220	RS Senior	Milton, ON	Graduated
Ty Groce	4	F	6'8"	220	Graduate Student	Ypsilanti, MI	Graduated
Bryce Golden	33	F	6'9"	245	Senior	Richmond, VA	Transferred to Loyola
Mike Parker	30	F	6'6"	210	RS Junior	Wilmington, NC	Graduated

=== Incoming transfers ===
Name	Number	Pos.	Height	Weight	Year	Hometown	Notes
Eric Hunter Jr.	2	G	6'4"	170	Graduate Student	Indianapolis, IN	Transferred from Purdue. Immediately eligible to play as he graduated from Purdue.
Jalen Thomas	1	F/C	6'10"	230	Senior	Detroit, MI	Transferred from Georgia State. Immediately eligible to play due to an NCAA ruling that all individuals who participate in winter sports in 2020–21 will have an extra year of eligibility, he will have two years of eligibility remaining instead of one.
Manny Bates	15	C	6'11"	240	Graduate Student	Fayetteville, NC	Transferred from North Carolina State. Immediately eligible to play as he graduated from North Carolina State. Will have two years of eligibility remaining.
Ali Ali	24	G/F	6'8"	205	Senior	Kendallville, IN	Transferred from Akron. Immediately eligible to play due to an NCAA ruling that all individuals who participate in winter sports in 2020–21 will have an extra year of eligibility, he will have two years of eligibility remaining instead of one.

=== Recruiting classes ===
==== 2022 recruiting class ====
College recruiting
Name	Hometown	School	Height	Weight	Commit date
Connor Turnbull; C	O'Fallon, MO	Fort Zumwalt North High School	6 ft 10 in (2.08 m)	210 lb (95 kg)	Jul 1, 2021
Connor Turnbull; C	Recruit ratings: Rivals: 247Sports: ESPN:				
Overall recruit ranking:
Note: In many cases, Scout, Rivals, 247Sports, On3, and ESPN may conflict in their listings of height and weight.; In these cases, the average was taken. ESPN grades are on a 100-point scale.; Sources: "ESPN – Butler Bulldogs Men's Basketball Recruiting". ESPN.

==== 2023 recruiting class ====
College recruiting (2023)
Name	Hometown	School	Height	Weight	Commit date
Finley Bizjack; SG	Trophy Club, TX	Byron Nelson High School	6 ft 3 in (1.91 m)	170 lb (77 kg)	Jul 1, 2022
Finley Bizjack; SG	Recruit ratings: Rivals: 247Sports: ESPN:				
Boden Kapke; C	Victoria, MN	Holy Family Catholic High School	6 ft 11 in (2.11 m)	230 lb (100 kg)	Sep 10, 2022
Boden Kapke; C	Recruit ratings: Rivals: 247Sports: ESPN:				
Overall recruit ranking:
Note: In many cases, Scout, Rivals, 247Sports, On3, and ESPN may conflict in their listings of height and weight.; In these cases, the average was taken. ESPN grades are on a 100-point scale.; Sources: "ESPN – Butler Bulldogs Men's Basketball Recruiting". ESPN.

== Roster ==
2022–23 Butler Bulldogs men's basketball team
Players
Coaches

Pos.	#	Name	Height	Weight	Year	Previous school	Hometown
G	2	Eric Hunter Jr.	6 ft 4 in (1.93 m)	170 lb (77 kg)	GS	Tindley Prep (Purdue)	Indianapolis, IN
C	15	Manny Bates	6 ft 11 in (2.11 m)	240 lb (109 kg)	GS	Northwood Temple Academy (N.C. State	Fayetteville, NC
F/C	35	John-Michael Mulloy (injured) (redshirt)	6 ft 10 in (2.08 m)	230 lb (104 kg)	Sr	Carmel	Carmel, IN
G/F	24	Ali Ali	6 ft 8 in (2.03 m)	205 lb (93 kg)	Sr	East Noble (Akron)	Kendallvile, IN
F/C	1	Jalen Thomas	6 ft 10 in (2.08 m)	230 lb (104 kg)	Sr	University of Detroit Jesuit (Georgia State)	Detroit, MI
G	3	Chuck Harris	6 ft 2 in (1.88 m)	200 lb (91 kg)	Jr	Gonzaga College	Ashburn, VA
F	11	Myles Wilmoth	6 ft 9 in (2.06 m)	215 lb (98 kg)	Jr	St. Andrew's School	Chestnut Ridge, NY
G	12	Myles Tate	6 ft 0 in (1.83 m)	165 lb (75 kg)	Jr	Dorman	Roebuck, SC
F	0	DJ Hughes	6 ft 6 in (1.98 m)	230 lb (104 kg)	So	Lawrence North	Indianapolis, IN
G	13	Jayden Taylor	6 ft 4 in (1.93 m)	195 lb (88 kg)	So	Perry Meridian	Indianapolis, IN
G/F	41	Simas Lukosius	6 ft 7 in (2.01 m)	225 lb (102 kg)	So	Vilnius Minties Gymnasium	Kaunas, Lithuania
G/F	14	Pierce Thomas	6 ft 5 in (1.96 m)	210 lb (95 kg)	RS Fr	Brownsburg	Brownsburg, IN
F/C	22	Connor Turnbull	6 ft 10 in (2.08 m)	215 lb (98 kg)	Fr	Fort Zumwalt North	St. Paul, MO

Head coach

- Thad Matta (Butler)

Assistant coach(es)

- Mike Pegues (Delaware)
- Kevin Kuwik (Notre Dame)
- Maurice Joseph (Vermont)

Legend

- (C) Team captain
- (S) Suspended
- (I) Ineligible
- (W) Walk-on
- Injured
- Current redshirt

Roster

== Schedule and results ==
Date time, TV	Rank^{#}	Opponent^{#}	Result	Record	High points	High rebounds	High assists	Site (attendance) city, state
Exhibition
October 29, 2022*; 7:00 p.m.		Tiffin	W 75–65	–	20 – Lukosius	8 – Bates	4 – Hunter Jr.	Hinkle Fieldhouse (6,884); Indianapolis, IN
November 1, 2022*; 7:00 p.m.		Davenport	W 91–55	–	22 – Harris	8 – Harris	6 – Hunter Jr.	Hinkle Fieldhouse (7,123); Indianapolis, IN
Non-conference regular season
November 7, 2022*; 6:30 p.m., FS1		New Orleans	W 89–53	1–0	25 – Bates	11 – Bates	5 – Lukosius	Hinkle Fieldhouse (9,122); Indianapolis, IN
November 14, 2022*; 8:30 p.m., FS1		at Penn State; Gavitt Tipoff Games	L 62–68	1–1	16 – Bates	10 – Bates	4 – Hunter Jr.	Bryce Jordan Center (6,762); University Park, PA
November 17, 2022*; 6:30 p.m., FS2		Saint Francis	W 95–67	2–1	22 – Harris	6 – P. Thomas	7 – Harris	Hinkle Fieldhouse (7,255); Indianapolis, IN
November 19, 2022*; 7:00 p.m., FS2		The Citadel	W 89–42	3–1	18 – Tied	9 – Tied	6 – Hunter Jr.	Hinkle Fieldhouse (7,520); Indianapolis, IN
November 23, 2022*; 7:30 p.m., ESPN2		vs. No. 22 Tennessee; Battle 4 Atlantis quarterfinal	L 45–71	3–2	18 – Taylor	6 – Hughes	3 – Harris	Imperial Arena (890); Nassau, Bahamas
November 24, 2022*; 6:30 p.m., ESPN3		vs. BYU; Battle 4 Atlantis consolation round	W 75–70	4–2	20 – Taylor	6 – Lukosius	4 – Bates	Imperial Arena (821); Nassau, Bahamas
November 25, 2022*; 10:00 p.m., ESPN2		vs. NC State; Battle 4 Atlantis 5th Place Game	L 61–76	4–3	20 – Harris	9 – Bates	4 – Lukosius	Imperial Arena (385); Nassau, Bahamas
November 30, 2022*; 6:30 p.m., FS1		Kansas State; Big East–Big 12 Battle	W 76–64	5–3	22 – Bates	10 – Bates	7 – Lukosius	Hinkle Fieldhouse (7,660); Indianapolis, IN
December 3, 2022*; 2:00 p.m., FS1		Tennessee Tech	W 80–66	6–3	32 – Harris	7 – Lukosius	3 – Tied	Hinkle Fieldhouse (7,723); Indianapolis, IN
December 6, 2022*; 6:30 p.m., FS1		Yale	W 71–61	7–3	22 – Bates	7 – Bates	4 – Hunter Jr.	Hinkle Fieldhouse (7,042); Indianapolis, IN
December 10, 2022*; 5:00 p.m., P12N		at California	W 82–58	8–3	16 – Tied	11 – Hunter Jr.	5 – Tied	Haas Pavilion (2,040); Berkeley, CA
Big East regular season
December 17, 2022; 7:00 p.m., FS1		No. 3 UConn	L 46–68	8–4 (0–1)	16 – Bates	6 – Harris	3 – Bates	Hinkle Fieldhouse (8,283); Indianapolis, IN
December 22, 2022; 8:00 p.m., FS1		at Creighton	L 56–78	8–5 (0–2)	14 – Harris	5 – Tied	3 – Harris	CHI Health Center Omaha (16,319); Omaha, NE
December 29, 2022; 6:30 p.m., FS1		Providence	L 52–72	8–6 (0–3)	12 – Tied	6 – J. Thomas	4 – Harris	Hinkle Fieldhouse (7,577); Indianapolis, IN
January 1, 2023; 6:45 p.m., FS1		at Georgetown	W 80–51	9–6 (1–3)	24 – Taylor	8 – Hunter Jr.	5 – Tied	Capital One Arena (6,140); Washington D.C.
January 4, 2023; 9:00 p.m., CBSSN		DePaul	W 78–70	10̣–6 (2–3)	23 – Hunter Jr.	5 – Tied	3 – Tied	Hinkle Fieldhouse (7,015); Indianapolis, IN
January 7, 2023; 8:30 p.m., FS1		at Seton Hall	L 51–76	10–7 (2–4)	14 – Taylor	8 – J. Thomas	3 – Lukosius	Prudential Center (9,033); Newark, NJ
January 10, 2023; 6:30 p.m., FS1		at St. John's	L 61–77	10–8 (2–5)	17 – Harris	6 – J. Thomas	4 – Ali	Carnesecca Arena (3,536); Queens, NY
January 13, 2023; 7:00 p.m., FS1		Villanova	W 79–71	11–8 (3–5)	28 – Lukosius	5 – J. Thomas	7 – Hunter Jr.	Hinkle Fieldhouse (8,688); Indianapolis, IN
January 17, 2023; 7:00 p.m., FS1		Creighton	L 52–73	11–9 (3–6)	18 – Lukosius	7 – J. Thomas	3 – Tied	Hinkle Fieldhouse (7,329); Indianapolis, IN
January 22, 2023; 12:00 p.m., FOX		at No. 15 UConn	L 56–86	11–10 (3–7)	16 – Harris	6 – Lukosius	3 – Harris	XL Center (15,564); Hartford, CT
January 25, 2023; 8:30 p.m., FS1		at No. 23 Providence	L 58–79	11–11 (3–8)	12 – Hunter Jr.	5 – Taylor	3 – Harris	Amica Mutual Pavilion (10,869); Providence, RI
January 28, 2023; 4:00 p.m., FS1		Seton Hall	L 49–70	11–12 (3–9)	11 – Lukosius	8 – J. Thomas	2 – Lukosius	Hinkle Fieldhouse (9,100); Indianapolis, IN
February 4, 2023; 2:00 p.m., FS1		at No. 14 Marquette	L 52–60	11–13 (3–10)	19 – Taylor	7 – Taylor	7 – Lukosius	Fiserv Forum (17,592); Milwaukee, WI
February 7, 2023; 8:30 p.m., FS1		St. John's	W 68–66	12–13 (4–10)	19 – Taylor	8 – Ali	5 – Lukosius	Hinkle Fieldhouse (6,894); Indianapolis, IN
February 10, 2023; 7:00 p.m., FS1		No. 13 Xavier	W 69–67	13–13 (5–10)	20 – Taylor	6 – Taylor	4 – Hunter Jr.	Hinkle Fieldhouse (9,352); Indianapolis, IN
February 14, 2023; 8:00 p.m., CBSSN		at Villanova	L 50–62	13–14 (5–11)	20 – Taylor	9 – Bates	3 – Tied	Finneran Pavilion (6,501); Villanova, PA
February 19, 2023; 3:00 p.m., FS1		Georgetown	L 62–68	13–15 (5–12)	21 – Taylor	8 – Hunter Jr.	5 – Hunter Jr.	Hinkle Fieldhouse (8,615); Indianapolis, IN
February 22, 2023; 8:30 p.m., FS1		at DePaul	W 59–58	14–15 (6–12)	15 – Tied	7 – Tied	5 – Ali	Wintrust Arena (4,356); Chicago, IL
February 28, 2023; 6:30 p.m., FS1		No. 6 Marquette	L 56–72	14–16 (6–13)	13 – Taylor	8 – J. Thomas	3 – Tied	Hinkle Fieldhouse (7,511); Indianapolis, IN
March 4, 2023; 7:00 p.m., FS1		at No. 19 Xavier	L 66–78	14–17 (6–14)	16 – Taylor	3 – Tied	7 – Hunter Jr.	Cintas Center (10,398); Cincinnati, OH
Big East tournament
March 8, 2023; 3:00 p.m., FS1	(9)	vs. (8) St. John's; First round	L 63–76	14–18	23 – Lukosius	6 – Tied	3 – Tied	Madison Square Garden (19,812); New York, NY
*Non-conference game. ^{#}Rankings from AP Poll. (#) Tournament seedings in parentheses. All times are in Eastern Time.

== Rankings ==
Ranking movements
	Week																			
Poll	Pre	1	2	3	4	5	6	7	8	9	10	11	12	13	14	15	16	17	18	Final
AP																				
Coaches																				

*AP does not release post-NCAA tournament rankings.
