= Nick Ongenda =

Canadian basketball player

- Ongenda with Manresa in 2026

No. 14 – Bàsquet Manresa
- Position: Center
- League: Liga ACB; EuroCup

Personal information
- Born: September 29, 2000 (age 26) Mississauga, Ontario, Canada
- Listed height: 6 ft 11 in (2.11 m)
- Listed weight: 230 lb (104 kg)

Career information
- High school: Southwest Christian Academy (Little Rock, Arkansas)
- College: DePaul (2019–2023)
- NBA draft: 2023: undrafted
- Playing career: 2023–present

Career history
- 2023–2024: Salt Lake City Stars
- 2024: Scarborough Shooting Stars
- 2024–2025: Anwil Włocławek
- 2025–2026: Elitzur Netanya
- 2026: Hapoel HaEmek
- 2026–present: Manresa

Career highlights
- CEBL blocks leader (2024)
- Stats at NBA.com
- Stats at Basketball Reference

Nickolas Ogendangenda (born September 29, 2000) is a Canadian professional basketball player for Manresa of the Liga ACB and the EuroCup. He played college basketball for the DePaul Blue Demons.

== High school career ==
Ongenda attended the Southwest Christian Academy at Little Rock, Arkansas, averaging 14 points, 12 rebounds, five blocks and three assists for the Lions during his senior season, earning a 2019 NACA All-American selection.

== College career ==
Ongenda played college basketball at DePaul, averaging 5.6 points, 3.7 rebounds, and 1.6 blocks in 18.8 minutes while shooting at a 52.9 percent clip. He ranked fourth in the Blue Demons' all-time blocks list with 135.

In his senior season, he appeared in just eight games after missing three months due to a wrist injury. Once he came back, he averaged 12.5 points, 6.3 rebounds and 3.1 blocks per game.

== Professional career ==
=== Salt Lake City Stars (2023–2024) ===
After going undrafted in the 2023 NBA draft, Ongenda joined the Utah Jazz for the 2023 NBA Summer League. On August 30, 2023, he signed with the Jazz, but was waived on October 11. On October 30, he joined the Salt Lake City Stars.

=== Scarborough Shooting Stars (2024) ===
In May 2024, Ongenda joined the Scarborough Shooting Stars of the Canadian Elite Basketball League.

=== Anwil Włocławek (2024–2025) ===
On August 8, 2024, Ongenda signed with Anwil Włocławek of the Polish Basketball League.

=== Bàsquet Manresa (2026–present) ===
On July 6, 2026, he signed a one-season contract with Manresa of the Liga ACB.

== Career statistics ==
Legend
GP	Games played	GS	Games started	MPG	Minutes per game
FG%	Field goal percentage	3P%	3-point field goal percentage	FT%	Free throw percentage
RPG	Rebounds per game	APG	Assists per game	SPG	Steals per game
BPG	Blocks per game	PPG	Points per game	**Bold**	Career high

=== College ===
Year	Team	GP	GS	MPG	FG%	3P%	FT%	RPG	APG	SPG	BPG	PPG
2019–20	DePaul	27	1	9.9	**.638**	.000	.565	2.0	.3	.2	.9	2.7
2020–21	DePaul	17	4	18.4	.597	.000	.590	4.0	.3	.3	1.5	5.7
2021–22	DePaul	**30**	**27**	23.9	.510	.000	.559	4.3	.8	.4	1.7	8.7
2022–23	DePaul	8	7	**30.5**	.466	.000	**.600**	**6.3**	**1.0**	**1.1**	**4.4**	**12.5**
Career		82	39	18.8	.529	.000	.573	3.7	.5	.4	1.6	6.5

== Personal life ==
The son of Francois and Senga Ongenda, he has a brother, Andre, and three sisters, Esther, Cynthia and Lillianne. His father played at the Université libre de Bruxelles and professionally for Spirou Charleroi in Belgium while his sister Lillianne played professionally for Azur Basketball Club in the Democratic Republic of Congo.
