= Tyler Kolek (basketball) =

American basketball player (born 2001)

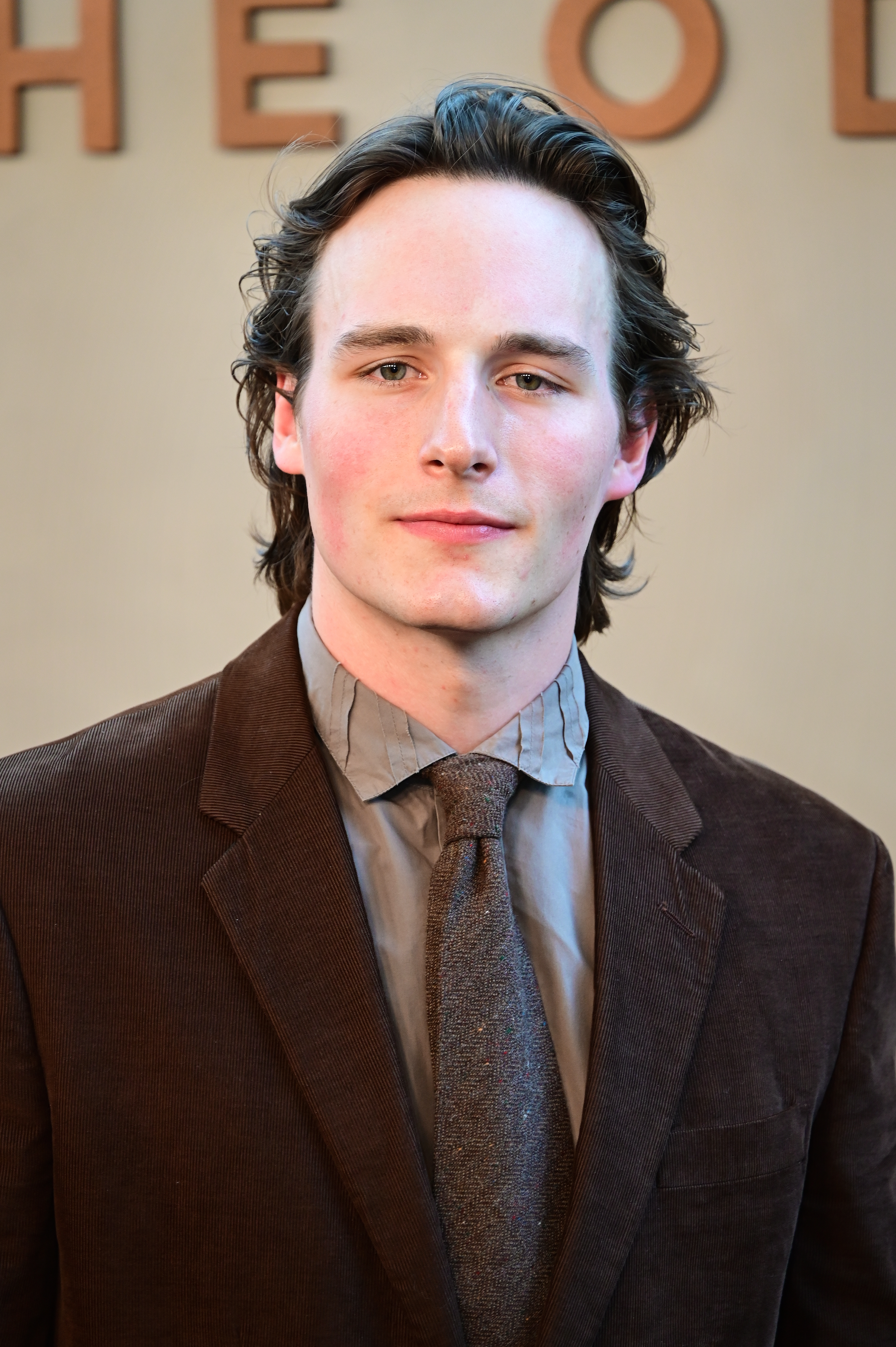
- Kolek in 2026

No. 13 – New York Knicks
- Position: Point guard
- League: NBA

Personal information
- Born: March 27, 2001 (age 25) Providence, Rhode Island, U.S.
- Listed height: 6 ft 2 in (1.88 m)
- Listed weight: 195 lb (88 kg)

Career information
- High school: Cumberland (Cumberland, Rhode Island); St. George's School (Middletown, Rhode Island)
- College: George Mason (2020–2021); Marquette (2021–2024)
- NBA draft: 2024: 2nd round, 34th overall pick
- Drafted by: Portland Trail Blazers
- Playing career: 2024–present

Career history
- 2024–present: New York Knicks
- 2024–2025: →Westchester Knicks

Career highlights
- NBA champion (2026); NBA Cup champion (2025); Consensus second-team All-American (2024); Second-team All-American – USBWA, SN (2023); Third-team All-American – AP, NABC (2023); NCAA assists leader (2024); Big East Player of the Year (2023); 2× First-team All-Big East (2023, 2024); Atlantic 10 Rookie of the Year (2021); Big East tournament MOP (2023)
- Stats at NBA.com
- Stats at Basketball Reference

Tyler John Kolek (born March 27, 2001) is an American professional basketball player for the New York Knicks of the National Basketball Association (NBA). He played college basketball for the George Mason Patriots and the Marquette Golden Eagles. Kolek was drafted as the 34th pick in the 2024 NBA draft by the Portland Trail Blazers, but was traded to the Knicks on draft night.

== High school career ==
Kolek grew up in Cumberland, Rhode Island, and initially attended Cumberland High School. He transferred to St. George's School before the start of his senior year. Kolek was named the Rhode Island Gatorade Boys Basketball Player of the Year as a junior after averaging 18.6 points, 8.4 rebounds, 2.8 assists and 2.5 steals per game. He committed to playing college basketball for George Mason over offers from Elon, Northeastern, Holy Cross and Vermont.

== College career ==
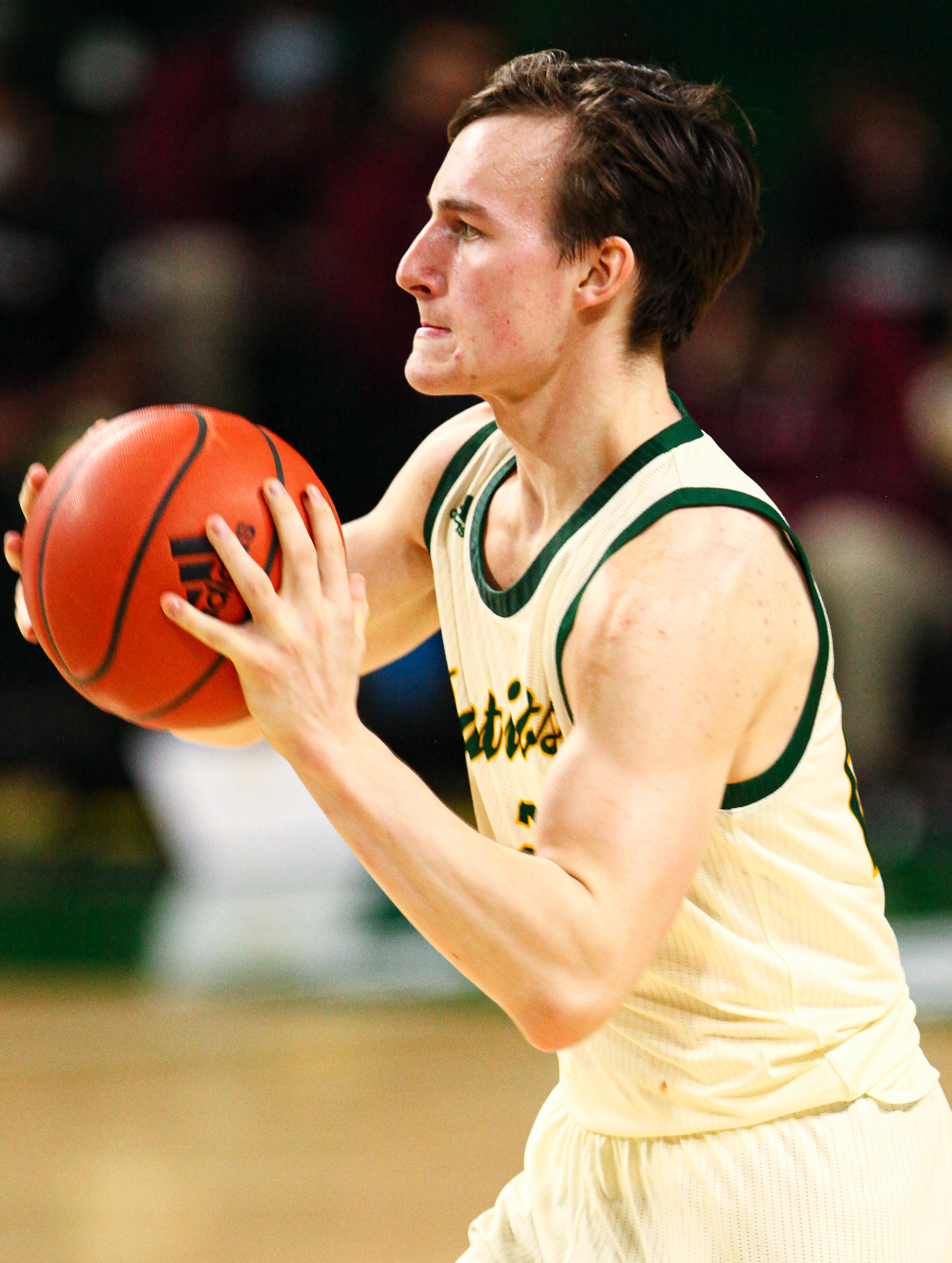
Kolek with George Mason University in 2021

Kolek began his college career at George Mason. He was named the Atlantic 10 Conference Rookie of the Year as a freshman after averaging 10.8 points, 3.6 rebounds and 2.3 assists per game. Following the end of the season, head coach Dave Paulsen was fired and Kolek entered the NCAA transfer portal.

Kolek ultimately transferred to Marquette. He averaged 6.7 points per game and led the Big East Conference with 5.9 assists per game in his first season with the Golden Eagles. Kolek was named the Big East Player of the Year and first team All-Big East as a junior. He was also named the Most Outstanding Player of the 2023 Big East tournament after averaging 18.7 points, seven rebounds and five assists in the three games. Kolek averaged 12.9 points, 7.5 assists, 4.1 rebounds and 1.8 steals over 36 games on the season.

Kolek was named the preseason Big East Player of the Year as well as to multiple preseason All-American teams entering his senior season.

== Professional career ==
Kolek was selected with the 34th overall pick in the 2024 NBA draft by the Portland Trail Blazers, however, he was subsequently traded to the New York Knicks in exchange for the draft rights of Dani Díez and second-round picks in 2027, 2029 and 2030. On July 5, 2024, he signed with the Knicks. Kolek made his NBA debut on October 22, in a 132–109 loss to the Boston Celtics, scoring three points. Throughout his rookie season, he has been assigned several times to the Westchester Knicks.

On January 1, 2025, Kolek appeared in a rare double-header for the Knicks and their G League team, the Westchester Knicks. Kolek scored 36 points and 11 assists for the Westchester Knicks and just hours later scored two points and four assists for the New York Knicks. Teammates Jalen Brunson and Josh Hart have nicknamed him "The Michael Jordan of Rhode Island".

In a December 23, 2025 game against the Minnesota Timberwolves, Kolek recorded a career-high 20 points. Despite losing the contest, he played a significant role in the Knicks' performance, also posting 11 rebounds and eight assists. On Christmas Day, Kolek scored 11 points in the fourth quarter to help fuel New York to a comeback victory over the Cleveland Cavaliers. On June 13, 2026, Kolek and the Knicks won the 2026 NBA Finals, beating the San Antonio Spurs 4–1.

== Career statistics ==
Legend
GP	Games played	GS	Games started	MPG	Minutes per game
FG%	Field goal percentage	3P%	3-point field goal percentage	FT%	Free throw percentage
RPG	Rebounds per game	APG	Assists per game	SPG	Steals per game
BPG	Blocks per game	PPG	Points per game	**Bold**	Career high
†	Won an NBA championship

=== NBA ===
==== Regular season ====
Year	Team	GP	GS	MPG	FG%	3P%	FT%	RPG	APG	SPG	BPG	PPG
2024–25	New York	41	0	7.2	.329	.298	**.765**	.7	1.7	.3	**.1**	2.0
2025–26†	New York	**62**	**1**	**11.7**	**.435**	**.386**	.700	**1.6**	**2.7**	**.4**	**.1**	**4.4**
Career		103	1	9.9	.409	.360	.730	1.2	2.3	.3	.1	3.4

==== Playoffs ====
Year	Team	GP	GS	MPG	FG%	3P%	FT%	RPG	APG	SPG	BPG	PPG
2025	New York	3	0	2.0	**1.000**	**1.000**	–	.3	1.0	.0	.0	1.0
2026†	New York	**8**	0	**6.6**	.440	.444	**1.000**	**.8**	**1.5**	.0	**.1**	**3.5**
Career		11	0	5.4	.462	.500	1.000	.6	1.4	.0	.1	2.8

=== College ===
Year	Team	GP	GS	MPG	FG%	3P%	FT%	RPG	APG	SPG	BPG	PPG
2020–21	George Mason	22	18	30.7	.399	.358	.794	3.6	2.3	1.3	.1	10.8
2021–22	Marquette	32	32	29.3	.320	.281	.810	3.7	5.9	1.4	.1	6.7
2022–23	Marquette	**36**	**36**	32.3	.471	**.398**	.802	4.1	7.5	**1.8**	.1	12.9
2023–24	Marquette	31	31	**33.0**	**.496**	.388	**.851**	**4.9**	**7.7**	1.6	**.2**	**15.3**
Career		121	117	31.4	.436	.355	.819	4.1	6.2	1.5	.1	11.5

== Personal life ==
Kolek's father, Kevin Kolek, of Polish descent and a retired police officer, played college basketball at Southeastern Massachusetts University (now the University of Massachusetts Dartmouth) and was named the Little East Conference Player of the Year twice. His older brother, Brandon, played basketball at Franklin Pierce University. Kolek is Catholic. During the 2025–26 season, Kolek worked with a stylist to develop a reputation for his fashion sense. He was described in a 2026 article in GQ as one of the league's "rising style stars".
