= 2021–22 Butler Bulldogs men's basketball team =

American college basketball season

2021–22 Butler Bulldogs men's basketball
- Conference: Big East Conference
- Record: 14–19 (6–14 Big East)
- Head coach: LaVall Jordan (5th season)
- Assistant coaches: Emerson Kampen (6th season); Omar Lowery (5th season); David Ragland (1st season)
- Home arena: Hinkle Fieldhouse

2021–22 Big East men's basketball standings
	Conf.				Overall
Team	W		L	PCT	W		L	PCT
No. 13 Providence	14	–	3	.824	27	–	6	.818
No. 6 Villanova †	16	–	4	.800	30	–	8	.789
No. 21 UConn	13	–	6	.684	23	–	10	.697
Creighton	12	–	7	.632	23	–	12	.657
Seton Hall	11	–	8	.579	21	–	11	.656
Marquette	11	–	8	.579	19	–	13	.594
Xavier	8	–	11	.421	23	–	13	.639
St. John's	8	–	11	.421	17	–	15	.531
Butler	6	–	14	.300	14	–	19	.424
DePaul	6	–	14	.300	15	–	16	.484
Georgetown	0	–	19	.000	6	–	25	.194
† 2022 Big East tournament winner Rankings from AP poll

The 2021–22 Butler Bulldogs men's basketball team represented Butler University in the 2021–22 NCAA Division I men's basketball season. They were coached by LaVall Jordan, in his fifth year as head coach of his alma mater. The Bulldogs played their home games at Hinkle Fieldhouse in Indianapolis, Indiana as members of the Big East Conference. They finished the season 14–19, 6–14 in Big East play to finish in ninth place. They defeated Xavier in the first round of the Big East tournament before losing to Providence in the quarterfinals.

On April 1, 2022, the school fired head coach LaVall Jordan. Two days later, the school named Thad Matta the team's new head coach. Matta previously was the head coach at Ohio State and Xavier and was the head coach at Butler for the 2000–01 season.

== Previous season ==
In a season limited due to the ongoing COVID-19 pandemic, the Bulldogs finished the 2020–21 season 10–15, 8–12 to finish in 10th place in Big East play. In the Big East tournament, they defeated Xavier in the first round before losing to Creighton in the quarterfinals.

== Offseason ==
=== Departures ===
Name	Number	Pos.	Height	Weight	Year	Hometown	Notes
Campbell Donovan	0	G	5'11"	185	RS Senior	Fort Wayne, IN	Graduated; chose not to take advantage of the NCAA's blanket COVID-19 eligibility waiver
Markeese Hastings	24	F	6'7"	210	Sophomore	Wyoming, MI	Transferred to Western Michigan
Jakobe Coles	21	F	6'7"	225	Freshman	Denton, TX	Transferred to TCU
Carlos Johnson	11	F	6'6"	230	RS Freshman	Benton Harbor, MI	Dismissed and unenrolled

=== Incoming transfers ===
Name	Number	Pos.	Height	Weight	Year	Hometown	Notes
Ty Groce	4	F	6'8"	220	Graduate Student	Ypsilanti, MI	Transferred from Eastern Michigan. Immediately eligible to play as he graduated from Eastern Michigan. Despite having played four full seasons previously, due to an NCAA ruling that all individuals who participate in winter sports in 2020–21 will receive an extra year of eligibility, he will have one year of eligibility remaining.

=== Recruiting classes ===
==== 2021 recruiting class ====
College recruiting
Name	Hometown	School	Height	Weight	Commit date
Jayden Taylor; SG	Indianapolis, IN	Perry Meridian High School	6 ft 3 in (1.91 m)	170 lb (77 kg)	Sep 19, 2019
Jayden Taylor; SG	Recruit ratings: Rivals: 247Sports: ESPN:				
Pierce Thomas; SF	Brownsburg, IN	Brownsburg High School	6 ft 5 in (1.96 m)	195 lb (88 kg)	Feb 27, 2020
Pierce Thomas; SF	Recruit ratings: Rivals: 247Sports: ESPN:				
DJ Hughes; PF	Indianapolis, IN	Lawrence North High School	6 ft 7 in (2.01 m)	215 lb (98 kg)	Jun 26, 2020
DJ Hughes; PF	Recruit ratings: Rivals: 247Sports: ESPN:				
Simas Lukosius; G/F	Kaunas, Lithuania	Vilnius Minties Gymnasium	6 ft 6 in (1.98 m)	N/A	Aug 31, 2021
Simas Lukosius; G/F	Recruit ratings: Rivals: 247Sports: ESPN:				
Overall recruit ranking:
Note: In many cases, Scout, Rivals, 247Sports, On3, and ESPN may conflict in their listings of height and weight.; In these cases, the average was taken. ESPN grades are on a 100-point scale.; Sources: "ESPN – Butler Bulldogs Men's Basketball Recruiting". ESPN.

==== 2022 recruiting class ====
College recruiting (2022)
Name	Hometown	School	Height	Weight	Commit date
Connor Turnbull; C	O'Fallon, MO	Fort Zumwalt North High School	6 ft 10 in (2.08 m)	210 lb (95 kg)	Jul 1, 2021
Connor Turnbull; C	Recruit ratings: Rivals: 247Sports: ESPN:				
Overall recruit ranking:
Note: In many cases, Scout, Rivals, 247Sports, On3, and ESPN may conflict in their listings of height and weight.; In these cases, the average was taken. ESPN grades are on a 100-point scale.; Sources: "ESPN – Butler Bulldogs Men's Basketball Recruiting". ESPN.

== Roster ==
2021–22 Butler Bulldogs men's basketball team
Players
Coaches

Pos.	#	Name	Height	Weight	Year	Previous school	Hometown
F	0	DJ Hughes	6 ft 6 in (1.98 m)	230 lb (104 kg)	Fr	Lawrence North	Indianapolis, IN
G/F	1	Bo Hodges	6 ft 5 in (1.96 m)	210 lb (95 kg)	RS Sr	Maplewood (East Tennessee State)	Nashville, TN
G	2	Aaron Thompson	6 ft 2 in (1.88 m)	190 lb (86 kg)	GS	Paul VI Catholic	Glenn Dale, MD
G	3	Chuck Harris	6 ft 2 in (1.88 m)	195 lb (88 kg)	So	Gonzaga College	Ashburn, VA
F	4	Ty Groce	6 ft 8 in (2.03 m)	220 lb (100 kg)	GS	Lincoln (Eastern Michigan)	Ypsilanti, MI
F	5	Myles Wilmoth	6 ft 9 in (2.06 m)	220 lb (100 kg)	So	St. Andrew's School	Chestnut Ridge, NY
F	10	Bryce Nze	6 ft 7 in (2.01 m)	235 lb (107 kg)	GS	Arrowhead (Milwaukee)	Hartland, WI
G	12	Myles Tate	6 ft 0 in (1.83 m)	165 lb (75 kg)	So	Dorman	Roebuck, SC
G	13	Jayden Taylor	6 ft 4 in (1.93 m)	190 lb (86 kg)	Fr	Perry Meridian	Indianapolis, IN
G/F	14	Pierce Thomas (redshirt)	6 ft 5 in (1.96 m)	205 lb (93 kg)	Fr	Brownsburg	Brownsburg, IN
F	25	Christian David	6 ft 6 in (1.98 m)	220 lb (100 kg)	RS Sr	Vermont Academy	Milton, Ontario
F	30	Mike Parker (W)	6 ft 6 in (1.98 m)	210 lb (95 kg)	RS Jr	Coastal Christian	Wilmington, NC
F	33	Bryce Golden	6 ft 9 in (2.06 m)	245 lb (111 kg)	Sr	St. James School	Richmond, VA
F/C	35	John-Michael Mulloy	6 ft 10 in (2.08 m)	230 lb (104 kg)	Jr	Carmel	Carmel, IN
G/F	41	Simas Lukosius	6 ft 6 in (1.98 m)	230 lb (104 kg)	Fr	Vilnius Minties Gymnasium	Kaunas, Lithuania
G	52	Jair Bolden	6 ft 3 in (1.91 m)	220 lb (100 kg)	GS	Westtown School (South Carolina)	Brooklyn, NY

Head coach

- LaVall Jordan (Butler)

Assistant coach(es)

- Emerson Kampen (Butler)
- Omar Lowery (Concordia (WI))
- David Ragland (Southern Indiana)

Legend

- (C) Team captain
- (S) Suspended
- (I) Ineligible
- (W) Walk-on
- Injured
- Current redshirt

Roster
Last update: July 12, 2021

== Schedule and results ==
- Date time, TV	Rank^{#}	Opponent^{#}	Result	Record	High points	High rebounds	High assists	Site (attendance) city, state
  Exhibition
  October 30, 2021*; 2:00 p.m.		Tiffin	W 94–84	–	25 – Taylor	10 – Nze	10 – Thompson	Hinkle Fieldhouse (6,458); Indianapolis, IN
  November 5, 2021*; 7:00 p.m.		Indianapolis	W 73–68	–	20 – Harris	11 – Nze	6 – Thompson	Hinkle Fieldhouse (6,986); Indianapolis, IN
  Non-conference regular season
  November 9, 2021*; 6:45 p.m., FS1		IUPUI	W 56–47	1–0	16 – Harris	7 – Tied	4 – Harris	Hinkle Fieldhouse (7,134); Indianapolis, IN
  November 12, 2021*; 6:30 p.m., FS2		Central Arkansas	W 85–53	2–0	18 – Taylor	7 – Nze	3 – Tied	Hinkle Fieldhouse (7,390); Indianapolis, IN
  November 13, 2021*; 8:00 p.m., FS2		Troy	W 70–59	3–0	23 – Harris	8 – Nze	5 – Nze	Hinkle Fieldhouse (7,227); Indianapolis, IN
  November 17, 2021*; 7:00 p.m., FS1		Michigan State; Gavitt Tipoff Games	L 52–73	3–1	15 – Groce	8 – Groce	4 – Harris	Hinkle Fieldhouse (9,100); Indianapolis, IN
  November 22, 2021*; 4:30 p.m., ESPN2		vs. No. 12 Houston; Maui Invitational tournament quarterfinal	L 52–70	3–2	16 – Bolden	7 – Groce	6 – Thompson	Michelob Ultra Arena (2,937); Paradise, NV
  November 23, 2021*; 2:30 p.m., ESPN2		vs. Texas A&M; Maui Invitational Tournament consolation game	L 50–57	3–3	10 – Bolden	6 – Thompson	3 – Thompson	Michelob Ultra Arena; Paradise, NV
  November 24, 2021*; 9:00 p.m., ESPNU		vs. Chaminade; Maui Invitational 7th place game	W 84–51	4–3	21 – Taylor	7 – Golden	6 – Bolden	Michelob Ultra Arena; Paradise, NV
  November 30, 2021*; 5:00 p.m., FS1		Saginaw Valley State	W 68–57	5–3	15 – Tied	8 – Golden	6 – Thompson	Hinkle Fieldhouse (6,706); Indianapolis, IN
  December 7, 2021*; 9:00 p.m., ESPN2		at Oklahoma; Big East–Big 12 Battle	W 66-62 ^{OT}	6–3	26 – Harris	7 – Golden	3 – Thompson	Lloyd Noble Center (8,654); Norman, OK
  December 11, 2021*; 4:00 p.m., FS1		Eastern Illinois	W 66–54	7–3	20 – Golden	7 – Groce	10 – Thompson	Hinkle Fieldhouse (7,654); Indianapolis, IN
  December 18, 2021*; 12:00 p.m., FOX		vs. No. 3 Purdue; Crossroads Classic	L 48–77	7–4	17 – Golden	5 – Lukosius	6 – Thompson	Gainbridge Fieldhouse (17,905); Indianapolis, IN
  Big East regular season
  December 29, 2021; 5:00 p.m., FS1		DePaul	W 63–59	8–4 (1–0)	15 – Lukosius	5 – Tied	7 – Thompson	Hinkle Fieldhouse (7,655); Indianapolis, IN
  January 4, 2022; 8:00 p.m., CBSSN		No. 24 Seton Hall	L 56–71	8–5 (1–1)	19 – Golden	5 – Nze	3 – Tied	Hinkle Fieldhouse (7,234); Indianapolis, IN
  January 7, 2022; 8:30 p.m., FS1		No. 22 Xavier	L 72–87	8–6 (1–2)	20 – Thompson	5 – Nze	4 – Thompson	Hinkle Fieldhouse (8,557); Indianapolis, IN
  January 13, 2022; 7:00 p.m., FS1		at Georgetown	W 72–58	9–6 (2–2)	23 – Bolden	7 – Tied	3 – Tied	Capital One Arena (4,117); Washington, D.C.
  January 16, 2022; 12:00 p.m., FS1		at No. 14 Villanova	L 42–82	9–7 (2–3)	10 – Nze	4 – Tied	1 – 5 Tied	Wells Fargo Center (17,009); Philadelphia, PA
  January 18, 2022; 7:00 p.m., FS1		at No. 25 UConn; Rescheduled from January 1	L 59–76	9–8 (2–4)	19 – Taylor	7 – Nze	2 – Tied	XL Center (11,538); Hartford, CT
  January 20, 2022; 9:00 p.m., FS1		No. 25 UConn	L 56–75	9–9 (2–5)	16 – Harris	7 – Nze	5 – Thompson	Hinkle Fieldhouse (6,797); Indianapolis, IN
  January 23, 2022; 12:00 p.m., FS1		at No. 21 Providence	L 62–69	9–10 (2–6)	21 – Harris	8 – Hodges	6 – Thompson	Dunkin' Donuts Center (10,561); Providence, RI
  January 26, 2022; 7:30 p.m., FS2		Creighton	W 72–55	10–10 (3–6)	18 – Hodges	7 – Hodges	6 – Thompson	Hinkle Fieldhouse (6,920); Indianapolis, IN
  January 29, 2022; 12:00 p.m., FS1		Georgetown	W 56–53	11–10 (4–6)	13 – Lukosius	12 – Nze	3 – Thompson	Hinkle Fieldhouse (8,156); Indianapolis, IN
  February 2, 2022; 7:00 p.m., CBSSN		at No. 21 Xavier	L 66–68	11–11 (4–7)	18 – Harris	6 – Nze	4 – Golden	Cintas Center (9,969); Cincinnati, OH
  February 5, 2022; 12:00 p.m., FS1		St. John's	L 72–75	11–12 (4–8)	22 – Hodges	7 – Hodges	7 – Thompson	Hinkle Fieldhouse (7,363); Indianapolis, IN
  February 8, 2022; 9:00 p.m., CBSSN		at Creighton	L 52–54	11–13 (4–9)	13 – Taylor	9 – Tied	2 – Tied	CHI Health Center Omaha (15,375); Omaha, NE
  February 12, 2022; 4:30 p.m., FS1		No. 18 Marquette	W 85–79	12–13 (5–9)	22 – Golden	11 – Hodges	5 – Tied	Hinkle Fieldhouse (8,086); Indianapolis, IN
  February 15, 2022; 9:00 p.m., FS1		at DePaul	W 73–71	13–13 (6–9)	18 – Harris	5 – Tied	4 – Thompson	Wintrust Arena (2,687); Chicago, IL
  February 18, 2022; 5:00 p.m., CBSSN		at St. John's; Rescheduled from December 23	L 57–91	13–14 (6–10)	19 – Taylor	6 – Taylor	4 – Taylor	Carnesecca Arena (4,527); Queens, NY
  February 20, 2022; 1:00 p.m., FS1		No. 8 Providence	L 70–71 ^{OT}	13–15 (6–11)	17 – Harris	8 – Hodges	4 – Thompson	Hinkle Fieldhouse (7,588); Indianapolis, IN
  February 23, 2022; 8:30 p.m., FS1		at Seton Hall	L 60–66	13–16 (6–12)	25 – Hodges	10 – Nze	3 – Thompson	Prudential Center (8,705); Newark, NJ
  February 26, 2022; 1:00 p.m., FOX		at Marquette	L 56–64	13–17 (6–13)	14 – Golden	11 – Nze	6 – Thompson	Fiserv Forum (17,504); Milwaukee, WI
  March 5, 2022; 12:00 p.m., FOX		No. 11 Villanova	L 59–78	13–18 (6–14)	19 – Harris	9 – Nze	3 – Thompson	Hinkle Fieldhouse (8,163); Indianapolis, IN
  Big East tournament
  March 9, 2022; 4:30 p.m., FS1	(9)	vs. (8) Xavier; First round	W 89–82 ^{OT}	14–18	29 – Harris	13 – Nze	4 – Thompson	Madison Square Garden (17,163); New York, NY
  March 10, 2022; 12:00 p.m., FS1	(9)	vs. (1) No. 11 Providence; Quarterfinals	L 61–65	14–19	14 – Harris	15 – Hodges	3 – Hodges	Madison Square Garden (19,812); New York, NY
  *Non-conference game. ^{#}Rankings from AP Poll. (#) Tournament seedings in parentheses. All times are in Eastern Time.

== Rankings ==
Ranking movements Legend: — = Not ranked RV = Received votes
	Week																			
Poll	Pre	1	2	3	4	5	6	7	8	9	10	11	12	13	14	15	16	17	18	Final
AP	—																			
Coaches	RV																			

*AP does not release post-NCAA tournament rankings.

== Awards ==
Name	Award(s)
