= 2022 Big East men's basketball tournament =

American college basketball postseason tournament

- Classification: Division I
- Season: 2021–22
- Teams: 11
- Site: Madison Square Garden; New York City
- Champions: Villanova (6th title)
- Winning coach: Jay Wright (5th title)
- Television: FS1, Fox

2021–22 Big East men's basketball standings
	Conf.				Overall
Team	W		L	PCT	W		L	PCT
No. 13 Providence	14	–	3	.824	27	–	6	.818
No. 6 Villanova †	16	–	4	.800	30	–	8	.789
No. 21 UConn	13	–	6	.684	23	–	10	.697
Creighton	12	–	7	.632	23	–	12	.657
Seton Hall	11	–	8	.579	21	–	11	.656
Marquette	11	–	8	.579	19	–	13	.594
Xavier	8	–	11	.421	23	–	13	.639
St. John's	8	–	11	.421	17	–	15	.531
Butler	6	–	14	.300	14	–	19	.424
DePaul	6	–	14	.300	15	–	16	.484
Georgetown	0	–	19	.000	6	–	25	.194
† 2022 Big East tournament winner Rankings from AP poll

The 2022 Big East men's basketball tournament was the postseason men's basketball tournament for the Big East Conference, held March 9–12, 2022, at Madison Square Garden in New York City. The winner of the tournament, the Villanova Wildcats, received the conference's automatic bid to the 2022 NCAA tournament.

== Seeds ==
All 11 Big East schools are scheduled to participate in the tournament. Teams will be seeded by the conference record with tie-breaking procedures to determine the seeds for teams with identical conference records. The top five teams will receive first-round byes. Seeding for the tournament will be determined at the close of the regular conference season.

Seed	School	Conference Record	Tiebreaker
1	Providence	14–3	
2	Villanova	16–4	
3	UConn	13–6	
4	Creighton	12–7	
5	Marquette	11–8	2–0 vs Seton Hall
6	Seton Hall	11–8	0–2 vs Marquette
7	St. John's	8–11	2–0 vs Xavier
8	Xavier	8–11	0–2 vs St. John's
9	Butler	6–14	2–0 vs. DePaul
10	DePaul	6–14	0–2 vs. Butler
11	Georgetown	0–19	

== Schedule ==
Game	Time	Matchup	Score	Television	Attendance
First round – Wednesday, March 9
1	4:30 pm	No. 8 Xavier vs. No. 9 Butler	82–89^{OT}	FS1	17,163
2	7:00 pm	No. 7 St. John's vs. No. 10 DePaul	92–73	FS1	17,163
3	10:10 pm	No. 6 Seton Hall vs. No. 11 Georgetown	57–53	FS1	17,163
Quarterfinals – Thursday, March 10
4	12:00 pm	No. 1 Providence vs. No. 9 Butler	65–61	FS1	19,812
5	2:30 pm	No. 4 Creighton vs. No. 5 Marquette	74–63	FS1	19,812
6	7:00 pm	No. 2 Villanova vs. No. 7 St. John's	66–65	FS1	19,812
7	9:30 pm	No. 3 UConn vs. No. 6 Seton Hall	62–52	FS1	19,812
Semifinals – Friday, March 11
8	6:30 pm	No. 1 Providence vs. No. 4 Creighton	58–85	FS1	19,812
9	9:00 pm	No. 2 Villanova vs. No. 3 UConn	63–60	FS1	19,812
Championship – Saturday, March 12
10	6:30 pm	No. 4 Creighton vs. No. 2 Villanova	48–54	FOX	19,812
Game times in Eastern Time. Rankings denote tournament seed.

== Bracket ==
First round Wednesday, March 9 FS1
8	Xavier	82
9	Butler	89*
7	St. John's	92
10	DePaul	73
6	Seton Hall	57
11	Georgetown	53

Quarterfinals; Thursday, March 10; FS1
1	#11 Providence	65
9	Butler	61
4	Creighton	74
5	Marquette	63
2	#8 Villanova	66
7	St. John's	65
3	#20 UConn	62
6	Seton Hall	52

Semifinals; Friday, March 11; FS1
1	#11 Providence	58
4	Creighton	85
2	#8 Villanova	63
3	#20 UConn	60

Championship; Saturday, March 12; FOX
4	Creighton	48
2	#8 Villanova	54

* denotes overtime period
