= 2021–22 St. John's Red Storm men's basketball team =

American college basketball season

2021–22 St. John's Red Storm men's basketball
- Conference: Big East Conference
- Record: 17–15 (8–11 Big East)
- Head coach: Mike Anderson (3rd season)
- Associate head coach: T.J. Cleveland; Van Macon
- Assistant coach: Greg Vetrone
- Home arena: Carnesecca Arena; Madison Square Garden

2021–22 Big East men's basketball standings
	Conf.				Overall
Team	W		L	PCT	W		L	PCT
No. 13 Providence	14	–	3	.824	27	–	6	.818
No. 6 Villanova †	16	–	4	.800	30	–	8	.789
No. 21 UConn	13	–	6	.684	23	–	10	.697
Creighton	12	–	7	.632	23	–	12	.657
Seton Hall	11	–	8	.579	21	–	11	.656
Marquette	11	–	8	.579	19	–	13	.594
Xavier	8	–	11	.421	23	–	13	.639
St. John's	8	–	11	.421	17	–	15	.531
Butler	6	–	14	.300	14	–	19	.424
DePaul	6	–	14	.300	15	–	16	.484
Georgetown	0	–	19	.000	6	–	25	.194
† 2022 Big East tournament winner Rankings from AP poll

The 2021–22 St. John's Red Storm men's basketball team represented St. John's University during the 2021–22 NCAA Division I men's basketball season. They were coached by Mike Anderson, in his third year at the school, and played their home games at Carnesecca Arena and Madison Square Garden as members of the Big East Conference.

== Previous season ==
The Red Storm finished the season 16–11, 10–9 in Big East play to finish in a tie for fourth place. As the No. 4 seed in the Big East tournament, they lost to Seton Hall in the quarterfinals.

== Offseason ==
=== Departures ===
Name	Number	Pos.	Height	Weight	Year	Hometown	Reason for departure
Josh Roberts	1	F	6'9"	220	Junior	Troy, AL	Transferred to Manhattan
Rasheem Dunn	3	G	6'2"	190	RS Senior	Brooklyn, NY	Graduate transferred to Robert Morris
Greg Williams Jr.	4	G	6'3"	200	Junior	Lafayette, LA	Transferred to Louisiana
Marcellus Earlington	10	G/F	6'6"	240	Junior	Stony Point, NY	Transferred to San Diego
John McGriff	11	G	6'0"	185	RS Freshman	Bowie, MD	Transferred to Binghamton
Arnaldo Toro	12	F	6'8"	240	GS Senior	Hormigueros, PR	Graduated
Isaih Moore	13	F	6'10"	205	Junior	Columbia, SC	Transferred to Southern Miss
Vince Cole	15	G/F	6'6"	185	Junior	Charleston, SC	Transferred to Coastal Carolina
David Caraher	23	G/F	6'6"	205	RS Junior	Chapel Hill, NC	Graduate transferred to High Point

=== Incoming transfers ===
Name	Num	Pos	Height	Weight	Year	Hometown	Previous school
Aaron Wheeler	1	F	6'9"	205	Graduate Student	Stamford, CT	Purdue (1 yr immediate eligibility)
Stef Smith	3	G	6'2"	195	Graduate Student	Ajax, ON	Vermont (1 yr immediate eligibility)
Tareq Coburn	10	G	6'5"	210	Graduate Student	Queens, NY	Hofstra (1 yr immediate eligibility)
Joel Soriano	11	C	6'11"	260	Junior	Yonkers, NY	Fordham (3 yrs immediate eligibility)
Esahia Nyiwe	22	F	6'10"	215	Junior	Omaha, NE	Clarendon (2 yrs immediate eligibility)
Montez Mathis	23	G	6'4"	210	Senior	Baltimore, MD	Rutgers (2 yrs immediate eligibility)

=== 2021 recruiting class ===
College recruiting information
Name	Hometown	School	Height	Weight	Commit date
Rafael Pinzon #34 SF	Arecibo, Puerto Rico	Long Island Lutheran	6 ft 5 in (1.96 m)	180 lb (82 kg)	Sep 14, 2020
Rafael Pinzon #34 SF	Recruit ratings: Rivals: 247Sports: ESPN: (79)				
O'Mar Stanley #34 C	Kansas City, MO	Link Year Prep (MO)	6 ft 8 in (2.03 m)	240 lb (110 kg)	Nov 13, 2020
O'Mar Stanley #34 C	Recruit ratings: Rivals: 247Sports: ESPN: (78)				
Drissa Traore #47 PF	Harlem, NY	Long Island Lutheran	6 ft 7 in (2.01 m)	210 lb (95 kg)	Aug 3, 2020
Drissa Traore #47 PF	Recruit ratings: Rivals: 247Sports: ESPN: (76)				
Overall recruit ranking:
Note: In many cases, Scout, Rivals, 247Sports, On3, and ESPN may conflict in their listings of height and weight.; In these cases, the average was taken. ESPN grades are on a 100-point scale.; Sources: "2021 Team Ranking". Rivals.

=== 2022 Recruiting class ===
College recruiting information (2022)
Name	Hometown	School	Height	Weight	Commit date
A. J. Storr #25 SF	Las Vegas, NV	IMG Academy	6 ft 6 in (1.98 m)	220 lb (100 kg)	Aug 4, 2021
A. J. Storr #25 SF	Recruit ratings: Rivals: 247Sports: ESPN: (82)				
Kolby King #65 PG	Pembroke Pines, FL	Pembroke Pines Charter School	6 ft 2 in (1.88 m)	170 lb (77 kg)	Aug 2, 2021
Kolby King #65 PG	Recruit ratings: Rivals: ESPN: (77)				
Overall recruit ranking:
Note: In many cases, Scout, Rivals, 247Sports, On3, and ESPN may conflict in their listings of height and weight.; In these cases, the average was taken. ESPN grades are on a 100-point scale.; Sources: "2022 Team Ranking". Rivals.

== Roster ==
2021–22 St. John's Red Storm men's basketball team
Players
Coaches

Pos.	#	Name	Height	Weight	Year	Previous school	Hometown
G	0	Posh Alexander	6 ft 0 in (1.83 m)	200 lb (91 kg)	So	Our Saviour Lutheran	Brooklyn, NY
F	1	Aaron Wheeler	6 ft 9 in (2.06 m)	205 lb (93 kg)	GS	Purdue	Stamford, CT
G/F	2	Julian Champagnie	6 ft 8 in (2.03 m)	215 lb (98 kg)	Jr	Bishop Loughlin	Brooklyn, NY
G	3	Stef Smith	6 ft 2 in (1.88 m)	195 lb (88 kg)	GS	Vermont	Ajax, Ontario
F	4	O'Mar Stanley	6 ft 8 in (2.03 m)	240 lb (109 kg)	Fr	Link Year Prep	Overland Park, KS
G	5	Dylan Addae-Wusu	6 ft 4 in (1.93 m)	225 lb (102 kg)	So	Our Saviour Lutheran	The Bronx, NY
G	10	Tareq Coburn	6 ft 5 in (1.96 m)	210 lb (95 kg)	GS	Hofstra	Queens, New York
F	11	Joel Soriano	6 ft 11 in (2.11 m)	260 lb (118 kg)	Jr	Fordham	Yonkers, NY
G	13	Jason Simpson (W)	5 ft 10 in (1.78 m)	155 lb (70 kg)	Fr	Montverde Academy	West Palm Beach, FL
G	14	Artemios Gavalas (W)	6 ft 0 in (1.83 m)	180 lb (82 kg)	So	Southampton	Southampton, NY
F	22	Esahia Nyiwe	6 ft 10 in (2.08 m)	215 lb (98 kg)	Jr	Clarendon College	Omaha, NE
G	23	Montez Mathis	6 ft 4 in (1.93 m)	210 lb (95 kg)	Sr	Rutgers	Baltimore, MD
G	24	Rafael Pinzon (injured)	6 ft 6 in (1.98 m)	175 lb (79 kg)	Fr	Long Island Lutheran	Arecibo, PR
F	34	Jalen Rosemond (W)	6 ft 8 in (2.03 m)	220 lb (100 kg)	Sr	Sanford H. Calhoun	Merrick, NY
F	55	Drissa Traore (redshirt)	6 ft 8 in (2.03 m)	210 lb (95 kg)	Fr	Long Island Lutheran	New York City, NY

Head coach

- Mike Anderson (Tulsa)

Assistant coach(es)

- T.J. Cleveland (Arkansas)
- Van Macon (Southampton)
- Greg Vetrone (LIU Post)

Legend

- (C) Team captain
- (S) Suspended
- (I) Ineligible
- (W) Walk-on
- Injured
- Current redshirt

Roster

== Schedule and results ==
Date time, TV	Rank^{#}	Opponent^{#}	Result	Record	High points	High rebounds	High assists	Site (attendance) city, state
Exhibition
October 27, 2021*; 7:00 p.m., ESPN3		Baruch	W 107–43		19 – Champagnie	13 – Champagnie	10 – Alexander	Carnesecca Arena (3,111); Queens, NY
Non-conference regular season
November 9, 2021*; 7:45 p.m., FS1		Mississippi Valley State	W 119–61	1–0	20 – Champagnie	13 – Soriano	7 – Alexander	Carnesecca Arena (4,749); Queens, NY
November 13, 2021*; 4:00 p.m., FS2		Saint Peter's	W 91–70	2–0	22 – Champagnie	7 – Wheeler	9 – Alexander	Carnesecca Arena (3,795); Queens, NY
November 17, 2021*; 9:00 p.m., FS1		at Indiana; Gavitt Tipoff Games	L 74–76	2–1	32 – Champagnie	7 – Champagnie	6 – Alexander	Simon Skjodt Assembly Hall (17,222); Bloomington, IN
November 20, 2021*; 6:00 p.m., FS2		Fairleigh Dickinson	W 87–74	3–1	17 – 2 Tied	10 – Champagnie	5 – Addae-Wusu	Carnesecca Arena (3,538); Queens, NY
November 23, 2021*; 7:00 p.m., FS2		St. Francis Brooklyn	W 76–70	4–1	23 – Champagnie	7 – Addae-Wusu	6 – Smith	Carnesecca Arena (3,415); Queens, NY
November 27, 2021*; 4:00 p.m., FS2		NJIT	W 77–68 ^{OT}	5–1	16 – 2 Tied	10 – Champagnie	7 – Alexander	Carnesecca Arena (3,243); Queens, NY
December 3, 2021*; 7:00 p.m., FS1		No. 8 Kansas; Big East–Big 12 Battle	L 75–95	5–2	24 – Champagnie	8 – Champagnie	4 – Addae-Wusu	UBS Arena (9,769); Elmont, NY
December 5, 2021*; 7:00 p.m., FS1		Fordham; Rivalry	W 83–69	6–2	23 – Alexander	8 – 2 Tied	11 – Addae-Wusu	Carnesecca Arena (3,951); Queens, NY
December 9, 2021*; 8:30 p.m., FS1		Monmouth; Gotham Classic	W 88–83	7–2	21 – Alexander	6 – 3 Tied	7 – Addae-Wusu	Carnesecca Arena (3,850); Queens, NY
December 12, 2021*; 12:00 p.m., FS1		Colgate; Gotham Classic	W 82–64	8–2	19 – Champagnie	7 – 2 Tied	4 – Alexander	Carnesecca Arena (3,510); Queens, NY
December 18, 2021*; 12:00 p.m., FS1		vs. Pittsburgh; Gotham Classic	L 57–59	8–3	12 – Addae-Wusu	9 – Soriano	5 – Alexander	Madison Square Garden (5,177); New York, NY
Big East regular season
December 29, 2021; 8:00 p.m., CBSSN		Marquette	Canceled due to Covid-19					Carnesecca Arena; Queens, NY
January 5, 2022; 6:30 p.m., FS1		DePaul	W 89–84	9–3 (1–0)	34 – Champagnie	16 – Champagnie	8 – Addae-Wusu	Carnesecca Arena (3,429); Queens, NY
January 8, 2022; 12:00 p.m., FS1		at No. 16 Providence	L 73–83	9–4 (1–1)	20 – Addae-Wusu	7 – 2 Tied	5 – Addae-Wusu	Dunkin' Donuts Center (10,008); Providence, RI
January 12, 2022; 8:30 p.m., FS1		at UConn	L 78–86 ^{OT}	9–5 (1–2)	27 – Champagnie	10 – Alexander	5 – Alexander	Harry A. Gampel Pavilion (6,671); Storrs, CT
January 16, 2022; 4:30 p.m., FOX		Georgetown; Rivalry	W 88–69	10–5 (2–2)	25 – Champagnie	6 – Tied	7 – Tied	Madison Square Garden (5,161); New York, NY
January 19, 2022; 7:00 p.m., FS1		at Creighton	L 64–87	10–6 (2–3)	17 – Champagnie	7 – Addae-Wusu	8 – Addae-Wusu	CHI Health Center Omaha (16,840); Omaha, NE
January 22, 2022; 12:00 p.m., FS1		Seton Hall	L 60–66	10–7 (2–4)	13 – Wheeler	14 – Soriano	5 – Alexander	Madison Square Garden (6,692); New York, NY
January 24, 2022; 9:00 p.m., FS1		at Seton Hall; Rescheduled from December 20	W 84–63	11–7 (3–4)	19 – Alexander	10 – Wheeler	5 – Tied	Walsh Gymnasium (1,316); South Orange, NJ
January 29, 2022; 4:30 p.m., FOX		at No. 14 Villanova	L 62–73	11–8 (3–5)	14 – Mathis	7 – Champagnie	4 – Tied	Finneran Pavilion (6,501); Villanova, PA
February 1, 2022; 9:00 p.m., CBSSN		No. 15 Providence	L 82–86	11–9 (3–6)	29 – Alexander	6 – Mathis	12 – Alexander	Carnesecca Arena (4,781); Queens, NY
February 3, 2022; 6:00 p.m., FS1		at Georgetown; Rivalry/Rescheduled from Jan. 1	W 90–77	12–9 (4–6)	27 – Champagnie	9 – Soriano	6 – Alexander	McDonough Gymnasium (1,100); Washington, D.C.
February 5, 2022; 12:00 p.m., FS1		at Butler	W 75–72	13–9 (5–6)	21 – Champagnie	8 – Champagnie	5 – Alexander	Hinkle Fieldhouse (7,363); Indianapolis, IN
February 8, 2022; 8:30 p.m., FS1		No. 15 Villanova	L 69–75	13–10 (5–7)	31 – Wheeler	11 – Addae-Wusu	5 – Addae-Wusu	Madison Square Garden (9,712); New York, NY
February 13, 2022; 12:00 p.m., FOX		No. 24 UConn	L 60–63	13–11 (5–8)	14 – Mathis	11 – Champagnie	5 – Addae-Wusu	Madison Square Garden (6,567); New York, NY
February 16, 2022; 6:30 p.m., CBSSN		at Xavier	W 86–73	14–11 (6–8)	27 – Champagnie	7 – Tied	5 – Tied	Cintas Center (10,160); Cincinnati, OH
February 18, 2022; 5:00 p.m., CBSSN		Butler; Rescheduled from December 23	W 91–57	15–11 (7–8)	31 – Champagnie	7 – Champagnie	10 – Alexander	Carnesecca Arena (4,527); Queens, NY
February 23, 2022; 6:30 p.m., FS1		Creighton	L 78–81	15–12 (7–9)	15 – Mathis	9 – Wheeler	5 – Addae-Wusu	Carnesecca Arena (4,542); Queens, NY
February 27, 2022; 5:00 p.m., FS1		at DePaul	L 94–99	15–13 (7–10)	26 – Champagnie	8 – Alexander	5 – Smith	Wintrust Arena (3,735); Chicago, IL
March 2, 2022; 6:30 p.m., FS1		Xavier	W 81–66	16–13 (8–10)	20 – Coburn	11 – Wheeler	8 – Alexander	Carnesecca Arena (4,352); Queens, NY
March 5, 2022; 9:00 p.m., FS1		at Marquette	L 77–85	16–14 (8–11)	19 – Addae-Wusu	6 – Soriano	9 – Alexander	Fiserv Forum (15,005); Milwaukee, WI
Big East tournament
March 9, 2022; 7:00 p.m., FS1	(7)	vs. (10) DePaul; First round	W 92–73	17–14	26 – Champagnie	9 – Nyiwe	7 – Alexander	Madison Square Garden (17,163); New York, NY
March 10, 2022; 7:00 p.m., FS1	(7)	vs. (2) No. 8 Villanova; Quarterfinals	L 65–66	17–15	23 – Champagnie	9 – Champagnie	5 – Alexander	Madison Square Garden (19,812); New York, NY
*Non-conference game. ^{#}Rankings from AP Poll. (#) Tournament seedings in parentheses. All times are in Eastern Time.

== Rankings ==
Ranking movements Legend: RV = Received votes
	Week																				
Poll	Pre	1	2	3	4	5	6	7	8	9	10	11	12	13	14	15	16	17	18	19	Final
AP	RV																				
Coaches																					

*No rankings released

== Awards and honors ==
=== Big East Conference honors ===
Preseason honors

- Julian Champagnie - First Team
- Posh Alexander - Second Team

==== Postseason honors ====
- Julian Champagnie - All-Big East First Team
- Posh Alexander - All-Big East Honorable Mention
