= 2021–22 Providence Friars men's basketball team =

American college basketball season

2021–22 Providence Friars men's basketball
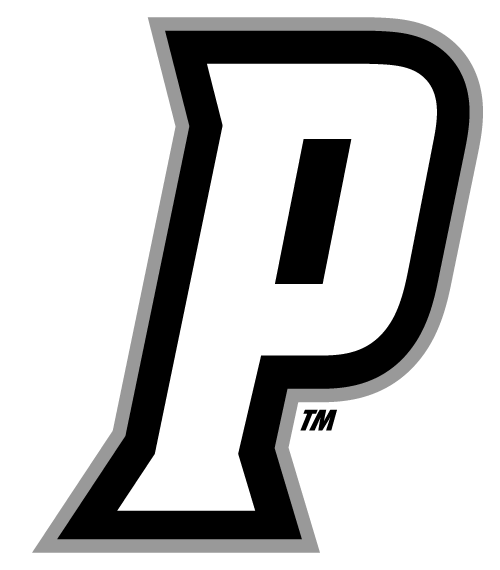

Big East regular season champions

NCAA tournament, Sweet Sixteen
- Conference: Big East Conference

Ranking
- Coaches: No. 13
- AP: No. 13
- Record: 27–6 (14–3 Big East)
- Head coach: Ed Cooley (11th season)
- Assistant coaches: Jeff Battle (7th season); Brian Blaney (11th season); Ivan Thomas (7th season)
- Home arena: Dunkin' Donuts Center

2021–22 Big East men's basketball standings
	Conf.				Overall
Team	W		L	PCT	W		L	PCT
No. 13 Providence	14	–	3	.824	27	–	6	.818
No. 6 Villanova †	16	–	4	.800	30	–	8	.789
No. 21 UConn	13	–	6	.684	23	–	10	.697
Creighton	12	–	7	.632	23	–	12	.657
Seton Hall	11	–	8	.579	21	–	11	.656
Marquette	11	–	8	.579	19	–	13	.594
Xavier	8	–	11	.421	23	–	13	.639
St. John's	8	–	11	.421	17	–	15	.531
Butler	6	–	14	.300	14	–	19	.424
DePaul	6	–	14	.300	15	–	16	.484
Georgetown	0	–	19	.000	6	–	25	.194
† 2022 Big East tournament winner Rankings from AP poll

The 2021–22 Providence Friars men's basketball team represented Providence College during the 2021–22 NCAA Division I men's basketball season. The team was led by 11th-year head coach Ed Cooley, and played their home games at Dunkin' Donuts Center in Providence, Rhode Island as a member of the Big East Conference. They finished the season 27–6, 14–3 in Big East play to win the school's first regular season championship. The Friars defeated Butler in the quarterfinals of the Big East tournament before losing to Creighton in the semifinals. They received an at-large bid to the NCAA tournament as the No. 4 seed in the Midwest region. They defeated South Dakota State and Richmond to advance to the Sweet Sixteen. There they lost to No. 1 seed and eventual national champion Kansas.

== Previous season ==
In a season limited due to the ongoing COVID-19 pandemic, the Friars finished the 2020–21 season 13–13, 9–10 in Big East play to finish in sixth place. As the No. 6 seed in the Big East tournament, they lost to DePaul in the first round.

== Offseason ==
=== Departures ===
Name	Number	Pos.	Height	Weight	Year	Hometown	Reason for departure
Greg Gantt	1	F	6'8"	220	Sophomore	Fayetteville, NC	Transferred to NC State
Kris Monroe	2	F	6'8"	215	Junior	Creedmoor, NC	Transferred to North Carolina Central
David Duke Jr.	3	G	6'5"	205	Junior	Providence, RI	Declared for the 2021 NBA draft
Jimmy Nichols Jr.	5	F	6'8"	220	Junior	Conway, SC	Transferred to VCU
Jyare Davis	13	F	6'7"	215	Freshman	Newark, DE	Transferred to Delaware

=== Incoming transfers ===
Name	Number	Pos.	Height	Weight	Year	Hometown	Previous school
Al Durham	1	G	6'4"	180	Graduate Student	Lilburn, GA	Indiana
Matteus Case	3	G	6'5"	190	Freshman	Pickering, ON	Penn
Justin Minaya	15	F	6'7"	210	Graduate Student	Harrington Park, NJ	South Carolina

=== Recruiting classes ===
==== 2021 recruiting class ====
College recruiting
Name	Hometown	School	Height	Weight	Commit date
Rafael Castro #24 PF	Dover, NJ	Dover High School	6 ft 9 in (2.06 m)	215 lb (98 kg)	Nov 5, 2020
Rafael Castro #24 PF	Recruit ratings: Scout: Rivals: 247Sports: ESPN: (81)				
Legend Geeter #30 PF	River Rouge, MI	River Rouge High School	6 ft 7 in (2.01 m)	210 lb (95 kg)	Sep 11, 2020
Legend Geeter #30 PF	Recruit ratings: Scout: Rivals: 247Sports: ESPN: (79)				
Overall recruit ranking:
Note: In many cases, Scout, Rivals, 247Sports, On3, and ESPN may conflict in their listings of height and weight.; In these cases, the average was taken. ESPN grades are on a 100-point scale.; Sources: "2021 Team Ranking". Rivals.

==== 2022 recruiting class ====
College recruiting (2022)
Name	Hometown	School	Height	Weight	Commit date
Quant'e Berry #40 SG	Cleveland, TN	Winston-Salem Prep	6 ft 5 in (1.96 m)	170 lb (77 kg)	Jul 5, 2021
Quant'e Berry #40 SG	Recruit ratings: Scout: Rivals: 247Sports: ESPN: (80)				
Jayden Pierre #39 PG	Brookville, NY	Long Island Lutheran High School	6 ft 2 in (1.88 m)	165 lb (75 kg)	Sep 26, 2021
Jayden Pierre #39 PG	Recruit ratings: Scout: Rivals: 247Sports: ESPN: (80)				
Christ Essandoko; C	Paris, France	Winston-Salem Prep	7 ft 0 in (2.13 m)	265 lb (120 kg)	Oct 2, 2021
Christ Essandoko; C	Recruit ratings: Scout: Rivals: 247Sports: ESPN: (NR)				
Overall recruit ranking:
Note: In many cases, Scout, Rivals, 247Sports, On3, and ESPN may conflict in their listings of height and weight.; In these cases, the average was taken. ESPN grades are on a 100-point scale.; Sources: "2022 Team Ranking". Rivals.

== Roster ==
2021–22 Providence Friars men's basketball team
Players
Coaches

Pos.	#	Name	Height	Weight	Year	Previous school	Hometown
C	0	Nate Watson	6 ft 10 in (2.08 m)	260 lb (118 kg)	GS	Bishop O'Connell High School	Portsmouth, Virginia
G	1	Al Durham	6 ft 4 in (1.93 m)	180 lb (82 kg)	GS	Berkmar; Indiana	Lilburn, Georgia
G	3	Matteus Case	6 ft 5 in (1.96 m)	190 lb (86 kg)	Fr	Chaminade College Prep; Penn	Pickering, Ontario
G	4	Jared Bynum	5 ft 10 in (1.78 m)	180 lb (82 kg)	RS Jr	Georgetown Prep; Saint Joseph's	Largo, Maryland
F	5	Ed Croswell	6 ft 8 in (2.03 m)	245 lb (111 kg)	Sr	St. Joseph's Prep; La Salle	Philadelphia, Pennsylvania
G	10	Alyn Breed	6 ft 3 in (1.91 m)	190 lb (86 kg)	So	McEachern High School	Powder Springs, Georgia
G	11	A. J. Reeves	6 ft 6 in (1.98 m)	205 lb (93 kg)	Sr	Brimmer and May School	Roxbury, Massachusetts
G	12	Brycen Goodine	6 ft 4 in (1.93 m)	190 lb (86 kg)	Jr	St. Andrew's School; Syracuse	New Bedford, Massachusetts
F	14	Noah Horchler	6 ft 8 in (2.03 m)	220 lb (100 kg)	GS	Melbourne High School; North Florida	Melbourne Beach, Florida
F	15	Justin Minaya	6 ft 7 in (2.01 m)	210 lb (95 kg)	GS	Northern Valley at Old Tappan; South Carolina	Harrington Park, New Jersey
G	22	Luke Fonts (W)	6 ft 1 in (1.85 m)	180 lb (82 kg)	Fr	Portsmouth Abbey School	Portsmouth, Rhode Island
F	23	Legend Geeter	6 ft 8 in (2.03 m)	235 lb (107 kg)	Fr	River Rouge High School	River Rouge, Michigan
G	24	Andrew Fonts (W)	6 ft 2 in (1.88 m)	175 lb (79 kg)	GS	Portsmouth Abbey School	Portsmouth, Rhode Island
F	30	Rafael Castro	6 ft 10 in (2.08 m)	215 lb (98 kg)	Fr	Dover High School	Dover, New Jersey
F	31	Kieran O'Haire (W)	6 ft 3 in (1.91 m)	185 lb (84 kg)	Fr	The Albany Academy	Menands, New York

Head coach

- Ed Cooley (Stonehill)

Assistant coach(es)

- Jeff Battle (Marshall)
- Brian Blaney (Roanoke)
- Ivan Thomas (VCU)

Legend

- (C) Team captain
- (S) Suspended
- (I) Ineligible
- (W) Walk-on
- Injured
- Current redshirt

Roster

== Schedule and results ==
The Friars had games against Creighton, UConn, and Seton Hall canceled due to COVID-19 protocols. An additional game against Georgetown was originally canceled and then later rescheduled for January 20, 2022.

Date time, TV	Rank^{#}	Opponent^{#}	Result	Record	High points	High rebounds	High assists	Site (attendance) city, state
Exhibition
October 21, 2021*; 7:00 p.m.		Stonehill	W 95–71		17 – Watson	8 – Durham	5 – Durham	Dunkin' Donuts Center (3,895); Providence, RI
Non-conference regular season
November 9, 2021*; 7:00 p.m., FS1		Fairfield	W 80–73	1–0	22 – Watson	11 – Horchler	4 – Bynum	Dunkin' Donuts Center (9,990); Providence, RI
November 11, 2021*; 6:30 p.m., FS1		Sacred Heart	W 92–64	2–0	15 – Breed	10 – Watson	4 – Bynum	Dunkin' Donuts Center (9,716); Providence, RI
November 15, 2021*; 9:00 p.m., FS1		at Wisconsin; Gavitt Tipoff Games	W 63–58	3–0	24 – Watson	9 – Bynum	7 – Bynum	Kohl Center (15,773); Madison, WI
November 18, 2021*; 6:30 p.m., FS2		New Hampshire	W 69–58	4–0	19 – Durham	12 – Horchler	4 – Horchler	Dunkin' Donuts Center (4,872); Providence, RI
November 22, 2021*; 9:30 p.m., ESPN+		vs. Northwestern; Legends Classic semifinals	W 77–72	5–0	16 – Watson	7 – Horchler	7 – Durham	Prudential Center (3,719); Newark, NJ
November 23, 2021*; 7:30 p.m., ESPN2		vs. Virginia; Legends Classic championship	L 40–58	5–1	14 – Horchler	7 – Horchler	3 – Bynum	Prudential Center (2,787); Newark, NJ
November 27, 2021*; 12:00 p.m., FS2		Saint Peter's	W 85–71	6–1	25 – Horchler	11 – Horchler	5 – Horchler	Dunkin' Donuts Center (6,978); Providence, RI
December 1, 2021*; 8:30 p.m., FS1		Texas Tech; Big East–Big 12 Battle	W 72–68	7–1	23 – Durham	8 – Reeves	2 – 2 tied	Dunkin' Donuts Center (10,022); Providence, RI
December 4, 2021*; 2:00 p.m., CBSSN		Rhode Island; Ocean State Rivalry	W 66–52	8–1	16 – Horchler	15 – Croswell	6 – Durham	Dunkin' Donuts Center (12,947); Providence, RI
December 7, 2021*; 6:30 p.m., FS1		Vermont	W 68–58	9–1	24 – 2 Tied	10 – Horchler	5 – Durham	Dunkin' Donuts Center (5,087); Providence, RI
December 11, 2021*; 2:00 p.m., FS1		Central Connecticut	W 68–53	10–1	17 – Reeves	10 – Horchler	7 – Reeves	Dunkin' Donuts Center (5,111); Providence, RI
Big East regular season
December 18, 2021; 5:00 p.m., FOX		at No. 20 UConn	W 57–53	11–1 (1–0)	16 – Reeves	7 – Watson	4 – Durham	XL Center (15,564); Hartford, CT
December 29, 2021; 7:00 p.m., FS1	No. 21	No. 15 Seton Hall	W 70–65	12–1 (2–0)	17 – Horchler	13 – Horchler	4 – Bynum	Dunkin' Donuts Center (12,069); Providence, RI
January 1, 2022; 3:00 p.m., FOX	No. 21	at DePaul	W 70–53	13–1 (3–0)	17 – Durham	11 – Minaya	7 – Bynum	Wintrust Arena (2,956); Chicago, IL
January 4, 2022; 9:00 p.m., FS1	No. 16т	at Marquette	L 56–88	13–2 (3–1)	16 – Durham	8 – Watson	3 – Bynum	Fiserv Forum (11,757); Milwaukee, WI
January 8, 2022; 12:00 p.m., FS1	No. 16т	St. John's	W 83–73	14–2 (4–1)	22 – Watson	13 – Horchler	3 – Bynum	Dunkin' Donuts Center (10,008); Providence, RI
January 11, 2022; 9:00 p.m., FS1	No. 23	at Creighton	Canceled due to COVID-19 protocols					CHI Health Center Omaha; Omaha, NE
January 15, 2022; 2:00 p.m., FS1	No. 23	UConn	Canceled due to COVID-19 protocols					Dunkin' Donuts Center; Providence, RI
January 18, 2022; 7:00 p.m., FS1	No. 21	at Seton Hall	Canceled due to COVID-19 protocols					Prudential Center; Newark, NJ
January 20, 2022; 5:00 p.m., FS1	No. 21	Georgetown; Rescheduled from December 22	W 83–75	15–2 (5–1)	15 – 2 Tied	9 – Minaya	8 – Bynum	Dunkin' Donuts Center (9,105); Providence, RI
January 23, 2022; 12:00 p.m., FS1	No. 21	Butler	W 69–62	16–2 (6–1)	18 – Watson	8 – 2 tied	6 – Bynum	Dunkin' Donuts Center (10,561); Providence, RI
January 26, 2022; 6:30 p.m., CBSSN	No. 17	at No. 21 Xavier	W 65–62	17–2 (7–1)	22 – Durham	11 – Horchler	4 – 2 tied	Cintas Center (10,224); Cincinnati, OH
January 30, 2022; 12:30 p.m., FS1	No. 17	No. 22 Marquette	W 65–63	18–2 (8–1)	17 – Watson	10 – Horchler	6 – Bynum	Dunkin' Donuts Center (12,157); Providence, RI
February 1, 2022; 9:00 p.m., CBSSN	No. 15	at St. John's	W 86–82	19–2 (9–1)	16 – Bynum	7 – Horchler	4 – 2 tied	Carnesecca Arena (4,781); Queens, NY
February 6, 2022; 12:00 p.m., FS1	No. 15	at Georgetown	W 71–52	20–2 (10–1)	32 – Bynum	10 – Horchler	3 – Durham	Capital One Arena (5,575); Washington, D.C.
February 12, 2022; 6:30 p.m., FS1	No. 11	DePaul	W 76–73 ^{OT}	21–2 (11–1)	25 – Bynum	7 – 3 Tied	6 – Bynum	Dunkin' Donuts Center (12,810); Provdience, RI
February 15, 2022; 8:00 p.m., CBSSN	No. 8	No. 10 Villanova	L 84–89	21–3 (11–2)	20 – Watson	7 – Tied	3 – Tied	Dunkin' Donuts Center (12,636); Providence, RI
February 20, 2022; 1:00 p.m., FS1	No. 8	at Butler	W 71–70 ^{OT}	22–3 (12–2)	22 – Watson	11 – Horchler	5 – Bynum	Hinkle Fieldhouse (7,588); Indianapolis, IN
February 23, 2022; 7:00 p.m., CBSSN	No. 11	Xavier	W 99–92 ^{3OT}	23–3 (13–2)	27 – Bynum	9 – Horchler	6 – Durham	Dunkin' Donuts Center (12,400); Providence, RI
February 26, 2022; 8:30 p.m., FS1	No. 11	Creighton	W 72–51	24–3 (14–2)	23 – Reeves	11 – Minaya	7 – Bynum	Dunkin' Donuts Center (12,400); Providence, RI
March 1, 2022; 6:30 p.m., FS1	No. 9	at No. 11 Villanova	L 74–76	24–4 (14–3)	19 – Bynum	7 – Horchler	10 – Bynum	Finneran Pavilion (6,501); Villanova, PA
Big East tournament
March 10, 2022; 12:00 p.m., FS1	(1) No. 11	vs. (9) Butler; Quarterfinals	W 65–61	25–4	26 – Watson	8 – Minaya	3 – Reeves	Madison Square Garden (19,812); New York, NY
March 11, 2022; 6:30 p.m., FS1	(1) No. 11	vs. (4) Creighton; Semifinals	L 58–85	25–5	21 – Durham	6 – Minaya	3 – Durham	Madison Square Garden (19,812); New York, NY
NCAA tournament
March 17, 2022; 12:40 p.m., truTV	(4 MW) No. 13	vs. (13 MW) South Dakota State; First Round	W 66–57	26–5	13 – Durham	9 – Tied	6 – Durham	KeyBank Center; Buffalo, NY
March 19, 2022; 6:10 p.m., TNT	(4 MW) No. 13	vs. (12 MW) Richmond; Second Round	W 79–51	27–5	16 – Horchler	14 – Horchler	6 – Bynum	KeyBank Center; Buffalo, NY
March 25, 2022; 7:29 p.m., TBS	(4 MW) No. 13	vs. (1 MW) No. 3 Kansas; Sweet Sixteen	L 61–66	27–6	21 – Durham	8 – Horchler	4 – Tied	United Center (20,857); Chicago, IL
*Non-conference game. ^{#}Rankings from AP Poll. (#) Tournament seedings in parentheses. All times are in Eastern Time.

== Awards and honors ==
=== Big East Conference honors ===
==== All-Big East Awards ====
- Coach of the Year: Ed Cooley
- Sixth Man: Jared Bynum

==== All-Big East Second Team ====
- Jared Bynum
- Nate Watson
