= 2021–22 UConn Huskies men's basketball team =

2021–22 UConn Huskies men's basketball

NCAA tournament, first round
- Conference: Big East Conference

Ranking
- AP: No. 21
- Record: 23–10 (13–6 Big East)
- Head coach: Dan Hurley (4th season)
- Associate head coach: Kimani Young
- Assistant coaches: Tom Moore; Luke Murray
- Home arena: Harry A. Gampel Pavilion; XL Center

2021–22 Big East men's basketball standings
	Conf.				Overall
Team	W		L	PCT	W		L	PCT
No. 13 Providence	14	–	3	.824	27	–	6	.818
No. 6 Villanova †	16	–	4	.800	30	–	8	.789
No. 21 UConn	13	–	6	.684	23	–	10	.697
Creighton	12	–	7	.632	23	–	12	.657
Seton Hall	11	–	8	.579	21	–	11	.656
Marquette	11	–	8	.579	19	–	13	.594
Xavier	8	–	11	.421	23	–	13	.639
St. John's	8	–	11	.421	17	–	15	.531
Butler	6	–	14	.300	14	–	19	.424
DePaul	6	–	14	.300	15	–	16	.484
Georgetown	0	–	19	.000	6	–	25	.194
† 2022 Big East tournament winner Rankings from AP poll

The 2021–22 UConn Huskies men's basketball team represented the University of Connecticut in the 2021–22 NCAA Division I men's basketball season. The Huskies were led by fourth-year head coach Dan Hurley in the team's second season since their return to the Big East Conference. The Huskies played their home games at the Harry A. Gampel Pavilion in Storrs, Connecticut and the XL Center in Hartford, Connecticut. They finished the season 23–10, 13–6 in Big East play to finish in third place.

UConn defeated Seton Hall in the quarterfinals to advance to the semifinals of the Big East tournament where they lost to Villanova. They received an at-large bid to the NCAA tournament as the No. 5 seed in the West Region, where they were upset in the First Round by New Mexico State 70–63.

== Previous season ==
In a season limited due to the ongoing COVID-19 pandemic, the Huskies finished the season 15–8, 11–6 in Big East play to finish in third place. They defeated DePaul in the quarterfinals of the Big East tournament before losing Creighton in the semifinals. They received an at-large bid to the NCAA tournament as the No. 7 seed in the East Region. They were eliminated by Maryland in the First Round.

== Offseason ==
=== Departures ===
Name	Number	Pos.	Height	Weight	Year	Hometown	Reason for departure
James Bouknight	2	G	6'5"	190	Sophomore	Brooklyn, NY	Declare for 2021 NBA draft
Brendan Adams	10	G	6'4"	195	Junior	Baltimore, MD	Transferred to George Washington
Josh Carlton	25	F/C	6'11"	240	Senior	Winterville, NC	Graduate transferred to Houston
Javonte Brown	31	C	7'0"	250	Freshman	Toronto, ON	Transferred to Texas A&M

=== 2021 recruiting class ===
College recruiting
Name	Hometown	School	Height	Weight	Commit date
Samson Johnson #10 PF	Lomé, Togo	The Patrick School	6 ft 9 in (2.06 m)	205 lb (93 kg)	Aug 10, 2020
Samson Johnson #10 PF	Recruit ratings: Rivals: 247Sports: ESPN: (86)				
Rahsool Diggins #12 PG	Philadelphia, PA	Archbishop Wood High School	6 ft 2 in (1.88 m)	210 lb (95 kg)	Jul 26, 2020
Rahsool Diggins #12 PG	Recruit ratings: Rivals: 247Sports: ESPN: (85)				
Jordan Hawkins #13 SG	Gaithersburg, MD	DeMatha Catholic High School	6 ft 2 in (1.88 m)	210 lb (95 kg)	Jul 26, 2020
Jordan Hawkins #13 SG	Recruit ratings: Rivals: 247Sports: ESPN: (84)				
Corey Floyd Jr. #20 PG / SG	Franklin, NJ	Roselle Catholic High School	6 ft 3 in (1.91 m)	180 lb (82 kg)	Jan 14, 2021
Corey Floyd Jr. #20 PG / SG	Recruit ratings: Rivals: 247Sports: ESPN: (81)				
Alex Karaban #5 PF	Northborough, MA	IMG Academy	6 ft 8 in (2.03 m)	210 lb (95 kg)	Aug 2, 2021
Alex Karaban #5 PF	Recruit ratings: Scout: Rivals: 247Sports: ESPN: (87)				
Overall recruit ranking: Rivals: 14 247Sports: 23 ESPN: 17
Note: In many cases, Scout, Rivals, 247Sports, On3, and ESPN may conflict in their listings of height and weight.; In these cases, the average was taken. ESPN grades are on a 100-point scale.; Sources: "2021 UConn Basketball Commitments". Rivals.; "2021 Team Ranking". Rivals.

=== 2022 Recruiting class ===
College recruiting (2022)
Name	Hometown	School	Height	Weight	Commit date
Donovan Clingan #14 C	Bristol, CT	Bristol Central High School	7 ft 1 in (2.16 m)	265 lb (120 kg)	Jul 2, 2021
Donovan Clingan #14 C	Recruit ratings: Scout: Rivals: 247Sports: ESPN: (85)				
Overall recruit ranking: Rivals: 14 247Sports: 23 ESPN: 17
Note: In many cases, Scout, Rivals, 247Sports, On3, and ESPN may conflict in their listings of height and weight.; In these cases, the average was taken. ESPN grades are on a 100-point scale.; Sources: "2022 UConn Basketball Commitments". Rivals.; "2022 Team Ranking". Rivals.

== Roster ==
2021–22 UConn Huskies men's basketball team
Players
Coaches

Pos.	#	Name	Height	Weight	Year	Previous school	Hometown
G	0	Jalen Gaffney	6 ft 3 in (1.91 m)	180 lb (82 kg)	Jr	Westtown School	Columbus, NJ
G	1	Rahsool Diggins	6 ft 2 in (1.88 m)	175 lb (79 kg)	Fr	Archbishop Wood	Philadelphia, PA
G	2	R. J. Cole	6 ft 1 in (1.85 m)	185 lb (84 kg)	GS	Howard	Union, NJ
G	4	Tyrese Martin	6 ft 6 in (1.98 m)	215 lb (98 kg)	Sr	Rhode Island	Allentown, PA
F	5	Isaiah Whaley	6 ft 9 in (2.06 m)	225 lb (102 kg)	GS	Mt. Zion Prep	Gastonia, NC
F	10	Alex Karaban (redshirt)	6 ft 8 in (2.03 m)	210 lb (95 kg)	Fr	IMG Academy	Northborough, MA
F	11	Akok Akok	6 ft 9 in (2.06 m)	205 lb (93 kg)	RS Jr	Putnam Science Academy	Manchester, NH
F	12	Tyler Polley	6 ft 9 in (2.06 m)	200 lb (91 kg)	GS	Sagemont	Miramar, FL
F	13	Richie Springs	6 ft 9 in (2.06 m)	225 lb (102 kg)	RS So	The MacDuffie School	Brooklyn, NY
G	14	Corey Floyd Jr. (redshirt)	6 ft 3 in (1.91 m)	210 lb (95 kg)	Fr	Roselle Catholic	Franklin, NJ
G	20	Andrew Hurley (W)	6 ft 1 in (1.85 m)	170 lb (77 kg)	So	East Catholic	Glastonbury, CT
F	21	Adama Sanogo	6 ft 9 in (2.06 m)	240 lb (109 kg)	So	The Patrick School	Bamako, Mali
G	24	Jordan Hawkins	6 ft 5 in (1.96 m)	190 lb (86 kg)	Fr	DeMatha Catholic	Gaithersburg, MD
F	35	Samson Johnson	6 ft 10 in (2.08 m)	205 lb (93 kg)	Fr	The Patrick School	Lomé, Togo
G	41	Matt Garry (injured) (W)	6 ft 5 in (1.96 m)	190 lb (86 kg)	Sr	St. Paul Catholic	Southington, CT
G	44	Andre Jackson Jr.	6 ft 6 in (1.98 m)	205 lb (93 kg)	So	Albany Academy	Amsterdam, NY

Head coach

- Dan Hurley (Seton Hall)

Assistant coach(es)

- Kimani Young (UTEP)
- Tom Moore (Boston University)
- Luke Murray (Fairfield)

Legend

- (C) Team captain
- (S) Suspended
- (I) Ineligible
- (W) Walk-on
- Injured
- Current redshirt

Roster

== Schedule and results ==
The Huskies game against Providence on January 15, 2022 was canceled due to COVID-19 protocols at Providence.

Date time, TV	Rank^{#}	Opponent^{#}	Result	Record	High points	High rebounds	High assists	Site (attendance) city, state
Non-conference regular season
November 9, 2021*; 6:30 p.m., FS1	No. 24	Central Connecticut	W 99–48	1–0	20 – Sanogo	7 – Akok	3 – 3 tied	Harry A. Gampel Pavilion (10,167); Storrs, CT
November 13, 2021*; 12:00 p.m., FS2	No. 24	Coppin State	W 89–54	2–0	20 – Sanogo	9 – Tied	8 – Gaffney	XL Center (9,690); Harford, CT
November 17, 2021*; 6:30 p.m., FS2	No. 23	LIU	W 93–40	3–0	17 – Polley	7 – Tied	6 – Cole	Harry A. Gampel Pavilion (8,481); Storrs, CT
November 20, 2021*; 12:00 p.m., FS1	No. 23	Binghamton	W 87–63	4–0	15 – Martin	11 – Maritn	4 – Martin	XL Center (9,335); Hartford, CT
November 24, 2021*; 2:30 p.m., ESPN	No. 22	vs. No. 19 Auburn; Battle 4 Atlantis Quarterfinals	W 115–109 ^{2OT}	5–0	30 – Sanogo	8 – Martin	6 – Cole	Imperial Arena (1,174); Nassau, Bahamas
November 25, 2021*; 12:00 p.m., ESPN	No. 22	vs. Michigan State; Battle 4 Atlantis Semifinals	L 60–64	5–1	18 – Sanogo	12 – Martin	3 – Cole	Imperial Arena (1,173); Nassau, Bahamas
November 26, 2021*; 1:30 p.m., ESPN2	No. 22	vs. VCU; Battle 4 Atlantis 3rd Place Game	W 70–63 ^{OT}	6–1	26 – Cole	14 – Jackson	4 – Jackson	Imperial Arena (673); Nassau, Bahamas
November 30, 2021*; 7:00 p.m., CBSSN	No. 17	Maryland Eastern Shore	W 72–63	7–1	25 – Cole	7 – Tied	5 – Gaffney	XL Center (8,782); Hartford, CT
December 4, 2021*; 4:00 p.m., FS2	No. 17	Grambling State	W 88–59	8–1	18 – Cole	8 – Whaley	7 – Cole	Harry A. Gampel Pavilion (9,159); Storrs, CT
December 8, 2021*; 7:00 p.m., ESPN2	No. 15	at West Virginia; Big East–Big 12 Battle	L 53–56	8–2	15 – Whaley	10 – Akok	3 – Tied	WVU Coliseum (12,045); Morgantown, WV
December 11, 2021*; 4:00 p.m., ESPN2	No. 15	vs. St. Bonaventure; Never Forget Tribute Classic	W 74–64	9–2	15 – Cole	11 – Jackson	5 – Jackson	Prudential Center; Newark, NJ
Big East regular season
December 18, 2021; 5:00 p.m., FOX	No. 20	Providence	L 53–57	9–3 (0–1)	16 – Cole	14 – Jackson	8 – Cole	XL Center (15,564); Hartford, CT
December 21, 2021; 9:00 p.m., FS1		at Marquette	W 78–70	10–3 (1–1)	25 – Martin	7 – Jackson	7 – Cole	Fiserv Forum (12,569); Milwaukee, WI
January 8, 2022; 12:00 p.m., FOX		at No. 24 Seton Hall	L 87–90 ^{OT}	10–4 (1–2)	18 – Sanogo	16 – Sanogo	4 – Tied	Prudential Center (10,977); Newark, NJ
January 12, 2022; 8:30 p.m., FS1		St. John's	W 86–78 ^{OT}	11–4 (2–2)	26 – Sanogo	18 – Sanogo	8 – Cole	Harry A. Gampel Pavilion (6,671); Storrs, CT
January 15, 2022; 2:00 p.m., FS1		at No. 23 Providence	Canceled due to COVID-19 protocols					Dunkin' Donuts Center; Providence, RI
January 18, 2022; 7:00 p.m., FS1	No. 25	Butler; Rescheduled from January 1	W 76–59	12–4 (3–2)	17 – Cole	15 – Sanogo	3 – 3 tied	XL Center (11,538); Hartford, CT
January 20, 2022; 9:00 p.m., FS1	No. 25	at Butler	W 75–56	13–4 (4–2)	27 – Martin	10 – Whaley	5 – Jackson	Hinkle Fieldhouse (6,797); Indianapolis, IN
January 25, 2022; 8:40 p.m., CBSSN	No. 20	Georgetown; Rivalry	W 96–73	14–4 (5–2)	19 – Sanogo	8 – Tied	7 – Cole	Harry A. Gampel Pavilion (7,429); Storrs, CT
January 29, 2022; 6:30 p.m., FS1	No. 20	at DePaul	W 57–50	15–4 (6–2)	25 – Cole	13 – Jackson	3 – Jackson	Wintrust Arena (4,376); Chicago, IL
February 1, 2022; 6:30 p.m., FS1	No. 17	Creighton	L 55–59	15–5 (6–3)	20 – Whaley	9 – Tied	3 – Cole	XL Center (10,443); Hartford, CT
February 5, 2022; 12:00 p.m., FOX	No. 17	at No. 12 Villanova	L 74–85	15–6 (6–4)	25 – Cole	5 – Whaley	4 – Cole	Wells Fargo Center (19,786); Philadelphia, PA
February 8, 2022; 6:30 p.m., FS1	No. 24	No. 18 Marquette	W 80–72	16–6 (7–4)	24 – Sanogo	15 – Tied	5 – Cole	XL Center (12,188); Hartford, CT
February 11, 2022; 7:00 p.m., FS1	No. 24	at No. 25 Xavier; Rescheduled from December 28	L 68–74	16–7 (7–5)	22 – Cole	6 – Tied	3 – Tied	Cintas Center (10,388); Cincinnati, OH
February 13, 2022; 12:00 p.m., FOX	No. 24	at St. John's	W 63–60	17–7 (8–5)	17 – Martin	16 – Jackson	5 – Cole	Madison Square Garden (6,567); New York, NY
February 16, 2022; 8:30 p.m., CBSSN	No. 24	Seton Hall	W 70–65	18–7 (9–5)	20 – Sanogo	16 – Sanogo	6 – Jackson	Harry A. Gampel Pavilion (10,167); Storrs, CT
February 19, 2022; 12:00 p.m., FOX	No. 24	Xavier	W 72–61	19–7 (10–5)	16 – Tied	11 – Martin	3 – 3 tied	Harry A. Gampel Pavilion (10,167); Storrs, CT
February 22, 2022; 8:00 p.m., FS1	No. 21	No. 8 Villanova	W 71–69	20–7 (11–5)	20 – Sanogo	9 – Martin	8 – Jackson	XL Center (15,564); Hartford, CT
February 27, 2022; 12:00 p.m., CBS	No. 21	at Georgetown; Rivalry	W 86–77	21–7 (12–5)	18 – Cole	14 – Martin	6 – Jackson	Capital One Arena (7,114); Washington, D.C.
March 2, 2022; 8:30 p.m., FS1	No. 18	at Creighton	L 62–64	21–8 (12–6)	20 – Cole	16 – Sanogo	4 – Cole	CHI Health Center Omaha (17,126); Omaha, NE
March 5, 2022; 5:00 p.m., FOX	No. 18	DePaul	W 75–68	22–8 (13–6)	26 – Sanogo	16 – Martin	4 – Jackson	Harry A. Gampel Pavilion (10,167); Storrs, CT
Big East tournament
March 10, 2022; 9:30 p.m., FS1	(3) No. 20	vs. (6) Seton Hall; Quarterfinals	W 62–52	23–8	17 – Tied	11 – Sanogo	4 – Tied	Madison Square Garden (19,812); New York, NY
March 11, 2022; 9:00 p.m., FS1	(3) No. 20	vs. (2) No. 8 Villanova; Semifinals	L 60–63	23–9	19 – Martin	13 – Sanogo	8 – Cole	Madison Square Garden (19,812); New York, NY
NCAA tournament
March 17, 2022*; 6:50 pm, TNT	(5 W) No. 21	vs. (12 W) New Mexico State; First Round	L 63–70	23–10	20 – Cole	8 – Sanogo	4 – Jackson	KeyBank Center; Buffalo, NY
*Non-conference game. ^{#}Rankings from AP Poll. (#) Tournament seedings in parentheses. W=West. All times are in Eastern Time.

== Rankings ==
Ranking movements Legend: ██ Increase in ranking ██ Decrease in ranking RV = Received votes т = Tied with team above or below
	Week																			
Poll	Pre	1	2	3	4	5	6	7	8	9	10	11	12	13	14	15	16	17	18	Final
AP	24	23	22	17	15	20	RV	RV	RV	RV	25	20	17	24	24	21	18	20	21	Not released
Coaches	23	23^	21	17	18	22	RV	RV	RV	RV	25т	19	17	23	24т	20	19	20	21	RV

*AP does not release post-NCAA Tournament rankings.
^Coaches do not release a Week 1 poll.

== Awards and honors ==
=== Big East Conference honors ===
==== All-Big East First Team ====
- R. J. Cole
- Adama Sanogo

==== Big East All-Freshman Team ====
- Jordan Hawkins
