= 2021–22 Marquette Golden Eagles men's basketball team =

Marquette Golden Eagles men's basketball

2021–22 Marquette Golden Eagles men's basketball
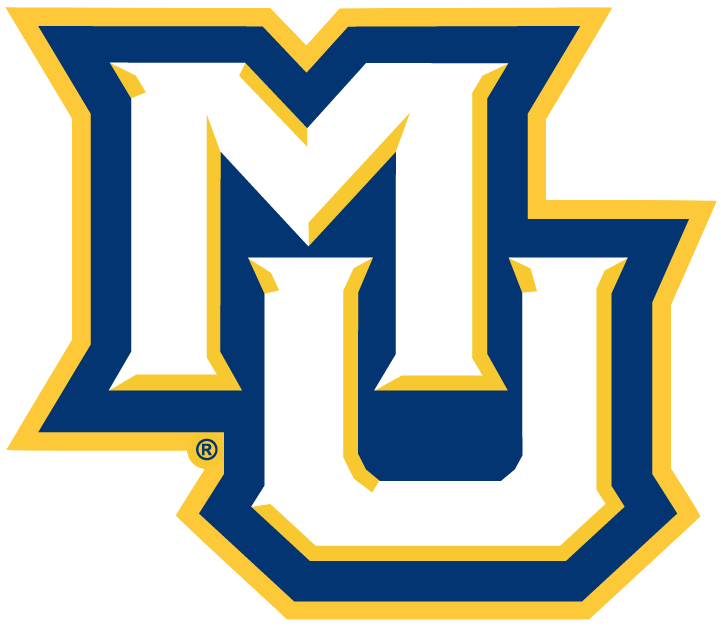

NCAA tournament, first round
- Conference: Big East Conference
- Record: 19–13 (11–8 Big East)
- Head coach: Shaka Smart (1st season)
- Assistant coaches: Neill Berry (1st season); Cody Hatt (1st season); DeAndre Haynes (1st season)
- Home arena: Fiserv Forum (Capacity: 17,341)

2021–22 Big East men's basketball standings
	Conf.				Overall
Team	W		L	PCT	W		L	PCT
No. 13 Providence	14	–	3	.824	27	–	6	.818
No. 6 Villanova †	16	–	4	.800	30	–	8	.789
No. 21 UConn	13	–	6	.684	23	–	10	.697
Creighton	12	–	7	.632	23	–	12	.657
Seton Hall	11	–	8	.579	21	–	11	.656
Marquette	11	–	8	.579	19	–	13	.594
Xavier	8	–	11	.421	23	–	13	.639
St. John's	8	–	11	.421	17	–	15	.531
Butler	6	–	14	.300	14	–	19	.424
DePaul	6	–	14	.300	15	–	16	.484
Georgetown	0	–	19	.000	6	–	25	.194
† 2022 Big East tournament winner Rankings from AP poll

The 2021–22 Marquette Golden Eagles men's basketball team represented Marquette University during the 2021–22 NCAA Division I men's basketball season. The team were led by first-year head coach Shaka Smart and played their home games at Fiserv Forum in Milwaukee, Wisconsin as a member of the Big East Conference. They finished the season 19–13, 11–8 in Big East play to finish a tie for fifth place. As the No. 5 seed, they lost in the quarterfinals of the Big East tournament to Creighton. They received an at-large bid to the NCAA tournament as the No. 9 seed in the East Region, where they lost in the First Round to North Carolina.

== Previous season ==
The Golden Eagles finished the 2019–20 season 13–14, 8–11 in Big East play to finish in ninth place. They lost in the first round of the Big East tournament to Georgetown.

On March 19, 2021, the school fired head coach Steve Wojciechowski. A week later, the school named Texas head coach Shaka Smart the team's new head coach.

== Offseason ==
=== Departures ===
Name	Number	Pos.	Height	Weight	Year	Hometown	Reason for departure
Theo John	4	F	6'9"	245	Senior	Minneapolis, MN	Graduate transferred to Duke
Symir Torrence	10	G	6'3"	200	Sophomore	Syracuse, NY	Transferred to Syracuse
Dexter Akanno	12	G	6'4"	205	RS Freshman	Valencia, CA	Transferred to Oregon State
D. J. Carton	21	G	6'2"	200	Sophomore	Bettendorf, IA	Declared for the 2021 NBA draft
Jamal Cain	23	F	6'7"	200	Senior	Pontiac, MI	Graduate transferred to Oakland
Koby McEwin	25	G	6'4'	195	RS Senior	Toronto, ON	Graduate transferred to Weber State
Dawson Garcia	33	F	6'11"	235	Freshman	Prior Lake, MN	Transferred to North Carolina
Tommy Gardiner	40	F	6'7"	230	Junior	Park Ridge, IL	Walk-on; didn't return
Luke Fizulich	50	G	6'2"	185	Freshman	Harrington Park, NJ	Transferred to Albany
Ike Eke	51	F	6'9"	220	RS Junior	Lagos, Nigeria	Retired from basketball due to injury
Jose Perez	55	G	6'5"	220	Junior	Bronx, NY	Transferred to Manhattan

=== Incoming transfers ===
Name	Number	Pos.	Height	Weight	Year	Hometown	Previous school
Olivier-Maxence Prosper	12	F	6'8"	220	Sophomore	Montreal, QC	Clemson
Tyler Kolek	22	G	6'3"	190	Sophomore	Cumberland, RI	George Mason
Darryl Morsell	32	G	6'5"	205	Graduate Student	Baltimore, MD	Maryland
Kur Kuath	35	F	6'10"	215	Graduate Student	Biemnon, South Sudan	Oklahoma

=== 2021 recruiting class ===
College recruiting information
Name	Hometown	School	Height	Weight	Commit date
Stevie Mitchell #15 PG	Reading, PA	Wilson High School	6 ft 2 in (1.88 m)	175 lb (79 kg)	Aug 5, 2020
Stevie Mitchell #15 PG	Recruit ratings: Scout: Rivals: 247Sports: ESPN: (82)				
Emarion Ellis #32 SG	Davenport, IA	Assumption High School	6 ft 4 in (1.93 m)	180 lb (82 kg)	Apr 14, 2021
Emarion Ellis #32 SG	Recruit ratings: Scout: Rivals: 247Sports: ESPN: (81)				
Kam Jones #24 PG	Cordova, TN	Evangelical Christian School	6 ft 3 in (1.91 m)	180 lb (82 kg)	Jun 30, 2020
Kam Jones #24 PG	Recruit ratings: Scout: Rivals: 247Sports: ESPN: (81)				
Keeyan Itejere #23 C	Knightdale, NC	Grace Academy	6 ft 9 in (2.06 m)	210 lb (95 kg)	Apr 14, 2021
Keeyan Itejere #23 C	Recruit ratings: Scout: Rivals: 247Sports: ESPN: (80)				
David Joplin #28 PF	Brookfield, WI	Brookfield Central High School	6 ft 7 in (2.01 m)	210 lb (95 kg)	Apr 14, 2021
David Joplin #28 PF	Recruit ratings: Scout: Rivals: 247Sports: ESPN: (80)				
Overall recruit ranking: Rivals: 14 247Sports: 23 ESPN: 17
Note: In many cases, Scout, Rivals, 247Sports, On3, and ESPN may conflict in their listings of height and weight.; In these cases, the average was taken. ESPN grades are on a 100-point scale.; Sources: "2021 Marquette Basketball Commitments". Rivals.; "2021 Team Ranking". Rivals.

=== 2022 Recruiting class ===
College recruiting information (2022)
Name	Hometown	School	Height	Weight	Commit date
Sean Jones #17 PG	Gahanna, OH	Lincoln High School	5 ft 10 in (1.78 m)	175 lb (79 kg)	Aug 13, 2021
Sean Jones #17 PG	Recruit ratings: Scout: Rivals: 247Sports: ESPN: (82)				
Chase Ross #34 SG	Ashburnham, MA	Cushing Academy	6 ft 4 in (1.93 m)	185 lb (84 kg)	Sep 24, 2021
Chase Ross #34 SG	Recruit ratings: Scout: Rivals: 247Sports: ESPN: (81)				
Overall recruit ranking: Rivals: 14 247Sports: 23 ESPN: 17
Note: In many cases, Scout, Rivals, 247Sports, On3, and ESPN may conflict in their listings of height and weight.; In these cases, the average was taken. ESPN grades are on a 100-point scale.; Sources: "2022 Marquette Basketball Commitments". Rivals.; "2022 Team Ranking". Rivals.

== Roster ==
2021–22 Marquette Golden Eagles men's basketball team
Players
Coaches

Pos.	#	Name	Height	Weight	Year	Previous school	Hometown
G	1	Kam Jones	6 ft 4 in (1.93 m)	185 lb (84 kg)	Fr	Evangelical Christian	Cordova, TN
G	2	Emarion Ellis	6 ft 5 in (1.96 m)	185 lb (84 kg)	Fr	Assumption HS	Davenport, IA
G	4	Stevie Mitchell	6 ft 2 in (1.88 m)	190 lb (86 kg)	Fr	Wilson HS	Reading, PA
G	5	Greg Elliott	6 ft 3 in (1.91 m)	180 lb (82 kg)	RS Sr	East English Village Prep	Detroit, MI
F	10	Justin Lewis	6 ft 7 in (2.01 m)	245 lb (111 kg)	So	Baltimore Poly	Baltimore, MD
F	12	Olivier-Maxence Prosper	6 ft 8 in (2.03 m)	220 lb (100 kg)	So	Clemson	Montreal, QC
F	13	Oso Ighodaro	6 ft 9 in (2.06 m)	215 lb (98 kg)	RS Fr	Desert Vista HS	Chandler, AZ
G	21	Cameron Brown (W)	6 ft 1 in (1.85 m)	190 lb (86 kg)	Fr	John Paul II HS	Plano, TX
G	22	Tyler Kolek	6 ft 3 in (1.91 m)	190 lb (86 kg)	So	George Mason	Cumberland, RI
F	23	David Joplin	6 ft 7 in (2.01 m)	215 lb (98 kg)	Fr	Brookfield Central HS	Brookfield, WI
G	32	Darryl Morsell	6 ft 5 in (1.96 m)	205 lb (93 kg)	GS	Maryland	Baltimore, MD
F	35	Kur Kuath	6 ft 10 in (2.08 m)	215 lb (98 kg)	GS	Oklahoma	Biemnon, South Sudan
F	40	Keeyan Itejere	6 ft 9 in (2.06 m)	205 lb (93 kg)	Fr	Grace Christian School	Knightdale, NC
G	41	Brendan Carney (W)	6 ft 2 in (1.88 m)	190 lb (86 kg)	Jr	Sacred Heart Prep	Menlo Park, CA
F	42	Michael Kennedy (W)	6 ft 6 in (1.98 m)	190 lb (86 kg)	Jr	Homestead HS	Mequon, WI

Head coach

- Shaka Smart (Kenyon)

Assistant coach(es)

- Neill Berry (Southeastern Louisiana)
- Cody Hatt (Norwich)
- DeAndre Haynes (Kent State)

Legend

- (C) Team captain
- (S) Suspended
- (I) Ineligible
- (W) Walk-on
- Injured
- Current redshirt

Roster

== Schedule and results ==
Date time, TV	Rank^{#}	Opponent^{#}	Result	Record	High points	High rebounds	High assists	Site (attendance) city, state
Exhibition
November 4, 2021*; 7:00 p.m.		Ferris State	W 98–40		15 – Kolek	10 – Kuath	7 – Kolek	Fiserv Forum (11,146); Milwaukee, WI
Non-conference regular season
November 9, 2021*; 7:30 p.m., FS2		SIU Edwardsville	W 88–77	1–0	21 – Morsell	11 – Lewis	9 – Kolek	Fiserv Forum (13,013); Milwaukee, WI
November 12, 2021*; 7:30 p.m., FS2		New Hampshire	W 75–70	2–0	26 – Morsell	12 – Ighodaro	5 – Morsell	Fiserv Forum (12,004); Milwaukee, WI
November 15, 2021*; 6:00 p.m., FS1		No. 10 Illinois; Gavitt Tipoff Games	W 67–66	3–0	21 – Morsell	5 – Tied	5 – Kolek	Fiserv Forum (14,631); Milwaukee, WI
November 18, 2021*; 6:00 p.m., ESPN2		vs. Ole Miss; Charleston Classic Quarterfinals	W 78–72	4–0	22 – Morsell	9 – Lewis	6 – Kolek	TD Arena; Charleston, SC
November 19, 2021*; 6:00 p.m., ESPN2		vs. West Virginia; Charleston Classic Semifinals	W 82–71	5–0	18 – Kolek	9 – Prosper	8 – Kolek	TD Arena; Charleston, SC
November 21, 2021*; 6:30 p.m., ESPN		vs. No. 22 St. Bonaventure; Charleston Classic Championship	L 54–70	5–1	17 – Lewis	11 – Lewis	3 – Tied	TD Arena (4,820); Charleston, SC
November 27, 2021*; 7:00 p.m., FS2		Northern Illinois	W 80–66	6–1	15 – Lewis	6 – Tied	5 – Kolek	Fiserv Forum (13,272); Milwaukee, WI
November 30, 2021*; 8:00 p.m., CBSSN		Jackson State	W 83–54	7–1	14 – Ighodaro	11 – Ighodaro	5 – Tied	Fiserv Forum (11,539); Milwaukee, WI
December 4, 2021*; 11:30 a.m., FOX		at No. 23 Wisconsin; Rivalry	L 76–89	7–2	14 – Lewis	7 – Morsell	8 – Kolek	Kohl Center (17,287); Madison, WI
December 8, 2021*; 8:00 p.m., ESPN2		at Kansas State; Big East–Big 12 Battle	W 64–63	8–2	15 – Jones	9 – Lewis	7 – Kolek	Bramlage Coliseum (7,184); Manhattan, KS
December 11, 2021*; 8:30 p.m., FS2/FS1		No. 4 UCLA	L 56–67	8–3	22 – Elliott	9 – Lewis	7 – Kolek	Fiserv Forum (15,028); Milwaukee, WI
Big East regular season
December 18, 2021; 3:00 p.m., FS1		at No. 22 Xavier	L 71–80	8–4 (0–1)	18 – Elliott	7 – Lewis	7 – Kolek	Cintas Center (10,224); Cincinnati, OH
December 21, 2021; 8:00 p.m., FS1		UConn	L 70–78	8–5 (0–2)	20 – Lewis	7 – Lewis	8 – Kolek	Fiserv Forum (12,569); Milwaukee, WI
December 29, 2021; 7:00 p.m., CBSSN		at St. John's	Canceled					Carnesecca Arena; Queens, NY
January 1, 2022; 11:00 a.m., FS1		Creighton	L 69–75 ^{2OT}	8–6 (0–3)	22 – Ighodaro	12 – Lewis	6 – Kolek	Fiserv Forum (13,689); Milwaukee, WI
January 4, 2022; 8:00 p.m., FS1		No. 16 Providence	W 88–56	9–6 (1–3)	23 – Lewis	11 – Lewis	9 – Kolek	Fiserv Forum (11,757); Milwaukee, WI
January 7, 2022; 5:30 p.m., FS1		at Georgetown	W 92–64	10–6 (2–3)	22 – Prosper	11 – Kuath	7 – Kolek	Capital One Arena (4,860); Washington, D.C.
January 11, 2022; 6:00 p.m., FS1		DePaul	W 87–76	11–6 (3–3)	25 – Elliott	5 – Lewis	10 – Kolek	Fiserv Forum (12,106); Milwaukee, WI
January 15, 2022; 11:00 a.m., FS1		No. 20 Seton Hall	W 73–72	12–6 (4–3)	26 – Morsell	6 – Kuath	7 – Kolek	Fiserv Forum (13,467); Milwaukee, WI
January 19, 2022; 7:00 p.m., CBSSN		at No. 11 Villanova	W 57–54	13–6 (5–3)	21 – Lewis	7 – Lewis	6 – Kolek	Finneran Pavilion (6,501); Villanova, PA
January 23, 2022; 1:00 p.m., FS1		No. 20 Xavier	W 75–64	14–6 (6–3)	20 – Lewis	13 – Lewis	7 – Tied	Fiserv Forum (14,658); Milwaukee, WI
January 26, 2022; 4:00 p.m., FS1	No. 22	at Seton Hall	W 73–63	15–6 (7–3)	33 – Lewis	9 – Lewis	6 – Lewis	Prudential Center (8,746); Newark, NJ
January 30, 2022; 11:30 a.m., FS1	No. 22	at No. 17 Providence	L 63–65	15–7 (7–4)	14 – Morsell	6 – Lewis	5 – Morsell	Dunkin' Donuts Center (12,157); Providence, RI
February 2, 2022; 9:00 p.m., FS1	No. 24	No. 12 Villanova	W 83–73	16–7 (8–4)	19 – Lewis	9 – Lewis	6 – Kolek	Fiserv Forum (12,782); Milwaukee, WI
February 8, 2022; 5:30 p.m., FS1	No. 18	at No. 24 UConn	L 72–80	16–8 (8–5)	18 – Prosper	9 – Lewis	4 – Kolek	XL Center (12,188); Hartford, CT
February 12, 2022; 3:30 p.m., FS1	No. 18	at Butler	L 79–85	16–9 (8–6)	27 – Lewis	9 – Lewis	3 – Morsell	Hinkle Fieldhouse (8,086); Indianapolis, IN
February 16, 2022; 7:00 p.m., FS2		Georgetown	W 77–66	17–9 (9–6)	19 – Jones	8 – Lewis	11 – Kolek	Fiserv Forum (12,721); Milwaukee, WI
February 20, 2022; 2:00 p.m., FS1		at Creighton	L 82–83	17–10 (9–7)	23 – Morsell	7 – Lewis	2 – Tied	CHI Health Center Omaha (18,192); Omaha, NE
February 26, 2022; 12:00 p.m., FOX		Butler	W 64–56	18–10 (10–7)	16 – Morsell	7 – Lewis	5 – Kolek	Fiserv Forum (17,504); Milwaukee, WI
March 2, 2022; 8:00 p.m., CBSSN		at DePaul	L 80–91	18–11 (10–8)	26 – Lewis	10 – Lewis	3 – Kolek	Wintrust Arena (6,024); Chicago, IL
March 5, 2022; 8:00 p.m., FS1		St. John's	W 85–77	19–11 (11–8)	28 – Lewis	7 – Lewis	6 – Kolek	Fiserv Forum (15,005); Milwaukee, WI
Big East tournament
March 10, 2022; 2:30 p.m., FS1	(5)	vs. (4) Creighton; Quarterfinals	L 63–74	19–12	18 – Morsell	7 – Tied	6 – Kolek	Madison Square Garden (19,812); New York, NY
NCAA tournament
March 17, 2022; 3:30 p.m., TBS	(9 MW)	vs. (8 MW) North Carolina; First Round	L 63–95	19–13	16 – Prosper	8 – Lewis	10 – Kolek	Dickies Arena (12,964); Fort Worth, TX
*Non-conference game. ^{#}Rankings from AP Poll. (#) Tournament seedings in parentheses. All times are in Central Time.

== Awards and honors ==
=== Big East Conference honors ===
==== All-Big East Awards ====
- Most Improved Player: Justin Lewis

==== All-Big East First Team ====
- Justin Lewis

==== All-Big East Honorable Mention ====
- Darryl Morsell

==== Big East All-Freshman Team ====
- Kam Jones
