= 2021–22 Xavier Musketeers men's basketball team =

2021–22 Xavier Musketeers men's basketball

NIT Champions
- Conference: Big East Conference
- Record: 23–13 (8–11 Big East)
- Head coach: Travis Steele (4th season); Jonas Hayes (interim)
- Assistant coaches: Dante Jackson (4th season); Danny Peters (1st season)
- Home arena: Cintas Center

2021–22 Big East men's basketball standings
	Conf.				Overall
Team	W		L	PCT	W		L	PCT
No. 13 Providence	14	–	3	.824	27	–	6	.818
No. 6 Villanova †	16	–	4	.800	30	–	8	.789
No. 21 UConn	13	–	6	.684	23	–	10	.697
Creighton	12	–	7	.632	23	–	12	.657
Seton Hall	11	–	8	.579	21	–	11	.656
Marquette	11	–	8	.579	19	–	13	.594
Xavier	8	–	11	.421	23	–	13	.639
St. John's	8	–	11	.421	17	–	15	.531
Butler	6	–	14	.300	14	–	19	.424
DePaul	6	–	14	.300	15	–	16	.484
Georgetown	0	–	19	.000	6	–	25	.194
† 2022 Big East tournament winner Rankings from AP poll

The 2021–22 Xavier Musketeers men's basketball team represented Xavier University during the 2021–22 NCAA Division I men's basketball season as a member of the Big East Conference. Led by fourth-year head coach Travis Steele for the first 32 games and interim head coach Jonas Hayes for the final four games, they played their home games at the Cintas Center in Cincinnati, Ohio. The Musketeers finished the season 23–13, 8–11 in Big East play to finish in a tie for seventh place. They lost in the first round of the Big East tournament to Butler. The team received an at-large bid to the National Invitation Tournament where they defeated Cleveland State, Florida, Vanderbilt, and St. Bonaventure to advance to the championship game. There they defeated Texas A&M to win the NIT championship.

Head coach Travis Steele was fired on March 16, 2022, the day after the first win in the NIT. Assistant coach Jonas Hayes was named the interim head coach and coached the team for the four remaining games in the NIT.

On March 19, the school named former Xavier and Arizona head coach Sean Miller the team's new head coach. Miller previously coached the Musketeers from 2004 to 2009.

== Previous season ==
In a season limited due to the ongoing COVID-19 pandemic, the Musketeers finished the 2020–21 season 13–8, 6–7 in Big East play to finish tied for seventh place. They lost in the first round of the Big East tournament to Butler.

== Offseason ==
On April 28, 2021, the NCAA officially adopted a measure that would allow athletes in all sports to transfer once without sitting out a season beginning with the 2021–22 season.

=== Departures ===
Name	Number	Pos.	Height	Weight	Year	Hometown	Reason for departure
C. J. Wilcher	0	G	6'5"	195	Freshman	Roselle, NJ	Transferred to Nebraska
Daniel Rasmey	2	F	6'9"	233	Sophomore	Cordele, GA	Transferred to Tennessee Tech
Bryan Griffin	13	F	6'8"	230	GS Senior	Pomona, NY	Graduated
Jason Carter	25	F	6'8"	227	RS Senior	Johnstown, OH	Graduated transferred to Ohio

=== Incoming transfers ===
Name	Num	Pos.	Height	Weight	Year	Hometown	Previous School
Jerome Hunter	21	F	6'8"	210	RS Junior	Columbus, OH	Indiana
Jack Nunge	24	F	7'0"	245	RS Junior	Newburgh, IN	Iowa

=== Recruiting classes ===
==== 2021 recruiting class ====
College recruiting information
Name	Hometown	School	Height	Weight	Commit date
Cesare Edwards #18 C	Hartsville, SC	Hartsville HS	6 ft 10 in (2.08 m)	205 lb (93 kg)	Jun 26, 2020
Cesare Edwards #18 C	Recruit ratings: Scout: Rivals: 247Sports:				
Elijah Tucker #39 PF	Canton, GA	Cherokee HS	6 ft 7 in (2.01 m)	190 lb (86 kg)	Aug 14, 2020
Elijah Tucker #39 PF	Recruit ratings: Scout: Rivals: 247Sports:				
Overall recruit ranking:
Note: In many cases, Scout, Rivals, 247Sports, On3, and ESPN may conflict in their listings of height and weight.; In these cases, the average was taken. ESPN grades are on a 100-point scale.; Sources: "Xavier 2021 Basketball Commitments". Rivals.; "2021 Xavier Musketeers Recruiting Class". ESPN.; "2021 Team Ranking". Rivals.; "Xavier 2021 Basketball Commits". 247Sports.

==== 2022 recruiting class ====
College recruiting information (2022)
Name	Hometown	School	Height	Weight	Commit date
Tyrell Ward #14 SF	Hyattsville, MD	DeMatha Catholic High School	6 ft 6 in (1.98 m)	185 lb (84 kg)	Jul 12, 2021
Tyrell Ward #14 SF	Recruit ratings: Scout: Rivals: 247Sports:				
Kam Craft #12 SG	Buffalo Grove, IL	The Skill Factory Prep School	6 ft 4 in (1.93 m)	185 lb (84 kg)	Jul 12, 2021
Kam Craft #12 SG	Recruit ratings: Scout: Rivals: 247Sports:				
Overall recruit ranking:
Note: In many cases, Scout, Rivals, 247Sports, On3, and ESPN may conflict in their listings of height and weight.; In these cases, the average was taken. ESPN grades are on a 100-point scale.; Sources: "Xavier 2022 Basketball Commitments". Rivals.; "2022 Xavier Musketeers Recruiting Class". ESPN.; "2022 Team Ranking". Rivals.; "Xavier 2022 Basketball Commits". 247Sports.

== Roster ==
2021–22 Xavier Musketeers men's basketball team
Players
Coaches

Pos.	#	Name	Height	Weight	Year	Previous school	Hometown
F	0	Elijah Tucker	6 ft 7 in (2.01 m)	214 lb (97 kg)	Fr	Cherokee HS	Canton, GA
G	1	Paul Scruggs	6 ft 5 in (1.96 m)	198 lb (90 kg)	GS	Prolific Prep	Indianapolis, IN
G	3	Colby Jones	6 ft 6 in (1.98 m)	207 lb (94 kg)	So	Mountain Brook HS	Birmingham, AL
F	4	Cesare Edwards	6 ft 9 in (2.06 m)	220 lb (100 kg)	Fr	Hartsville HS	Hartsville, SC
G	5	Adam Kunkel	6 ft 4 in (1.93 m)	180 lb (82 kg)	Sr	Belmont	Hebron, KY
G	10	Nate Johnson	6 ft 4 in (1.93 m)	192 lb (87 kg)	GS	Gardner-Webb	Miami, FL
G	11	Dwon Odom	6 ft 2 in (1.88 m)	182 lb (83 kg)	So	St. Francis HS	Alpharetta, GA
G	12	Zak Swetye (W)	6 ft 1 in (1.85 m)	187 lb (85 kg)	Sr	Darien HS	Darien, CT
F	14	Ben Stanley	6 ft 6 in (1.98 m)	225 lb (102 kg)	RS Sr	Hampton	Baltimore, MD
G	15	KyKy Tandy	6 ft 2 in (1.88 m)	199 lb (90 kg)	Jr	University Heights Academy	Hopkinsville, KY
G	20	Ramon Singh (W)	6 ft 4 in (1.93 m)	187 lb (85 kg)	Sr	La Lumiere School	Sydney, Australia
F	21	Jerome Hunter	6 ft 8 in (2.03 m)	210 lb (95 kg)	RS Jr	Indiana	Columbus, OH
F	22	Dieonte Miles	6 ft 11 in (2.11 m)	231 lb (105 kg)	RS So	Walton-Verona HS	Walton, KY
F	24	Jack Nunge	7 ft 0 in (2.13 m)	245 lb (111 kg)	RS Jr	Iowa	Newburgh, IN
G	25	Spencer Cody (W)	5 ft 11 in (1.8 m)	185 lb (84 kg)	Sr	DePaul Prep	Chicago, IL
F	32	Zach Freemantle	6 ft 9 in (2.06 m)	220 lb (100 kg)	Jr	Bergen Catholic HS	Teaneck, NJ

Head coach

- Travis Steele (Butler)

Assistant coach(es)

- Jonas Hayes (Georgia)
- Dante Jackson (Xavier)
- Danny Peters (Ohio State)

Legend

- (C) Team captain
- (S) Suspended
- (I) Ineligible
- (W) Walk-on
- Injured
- Current redshirt

Roster

== Schedule and results ==
Date time, TV	Rank^{#}	Opponent^{#}	Result	Record	High points	High rebounds	High assists	Site (attendance) city, state
Exhibition
November 5, 2021*; 7:00 p.m.		Ferris State	W 100–59		21 – Kunkel	11 – Jones	4 – Scruggs	Cintas Center (9,544); Cincinnati, OH
Non-conference regular season
November 9, 2021*; 7:30 p.m., FS1		Niagara	W 63–60	1–0	17 – Scruggs	9 – Hunter	6 – Scruggs	Cintas Center (10,003); Cincinnati, OH
November 12, 2021*; 6:30 p.m., FS1		Kent State	W 73–59	2–0	23 – Scruggs	9 – Hunter	4 – Kunkel	Cintas Center (10,224); Cincinnati, OH
November 18, 2021*; 6:30 p.m., FS1		No. 19 Ohio State; Gavitt Tipoff Games	W 71–65	3–0	14 – 2 tied	14 – Nunge	4 – 2 tied	Cintas Center (10,379); Cincinnati, OH
November 21, 2021*; 12:00 p.m., FS1		Norfolk State	W 88–48	4–0	26 – Kunkel	13 – Jones	6 – 2 tied	Cintas Center (9,361); Cincinnati, OH
November 24, 2021*; 7:00 p.m., ESPNU	No. 25	vs. Iowa State; NIT Season Tip-Off Semifinals	L 70–82	4–1	24 – Nunge	12 – Jones	3 – 2 tied	Barclays Center (2,804); Brooklyn, NY
November 26, 2021*; 7:00 p.m., ESPN2	No. 25	vs. Virginia Tech; NIT Season Tip-Off 3rd Place Game	W 59–58	5–1	30 – Johnson	14 – Nunge	7 – Scruggs	Barclays Center (N/A); Brooklyn, NY
December 1, 2021*; 6:30 p.m., FS1		Central Michigan	W 78–45	6–1	24 – Johnson	7 – Nunge	7 – Jones	Cintas Center (9,449); Cincinnati, OH
December 5, 2021*; 5:00 p.m., ESPN2		at Oklahoma State; Big East–Big 12 Battle	W 77–71	7–1	19 – Scruggs	12 – Jones	4 – Jones	Gallagher-Iba Arena (7,326); Stillwater, OK
December 8, 2021*; 6:30 p.m., FS1		Ball State	W 96–50	8–1	24 – Freemantle	9 – Scruggs	6 – Odom	Cintas Center (9,865); Cincinnati, OH
December 11, 2021*; 8:30 p.m., FS1		Cincinnati; Rivalry/Crosstown Shootout	W 83–63	9–1	31 – Nunge	15 – Nunge	5 – Scruggs	Cintas Center (10,707); Cincinnati, OH
December 15, 2021*; 8:30 p.m., FS1	No. 22	Morehead State	W 86–63	10–1	15 – Hunter	7 – Nunge	6 – 2 tied	Cintas Center (9,252); Cincinnati, OH
Big East regular season
December 18, 2021; 4:00 p.m., FS1	No. 22	Marquette	W 80–71	11–1 (1–0)	19 – Odom	12 – Nunge	5 – Scruggs	Cintas Center (10,224); Cincinnati, OH
December 21, 2021; 7:00 p.m., FS1	No. 18	at No. 23 Villanova	L 58–71	11–2 (1–1)	13 – Odom	8 – Jones	4 – Scruggs	Finneran Pavilion (6,501); Villanova, PA
January 4, 2022; 7:00 p.m., FS1	No. 22	at Georgetown	Canceled					Capital One Arena; Washington, D.C.
January 7, 2022; 8:30 p.m., FS1	No. 22	at Butler	W 87–72	12–2 (2–1)	25 – Kunkel	7 – Tied	6 – Scruggs	Hinkle Fieldhouse (8,557); Indianapolis, IN
January 12, 2022; 6:30 p.m., FS1	No. 17	No. 14 Villanova	L 60–64	12–3 (2–2)	15 – Tied	10 – Jones	4 – Kunkel	Cintas Center (10,224); Cincinnati, OH
January 15, 2022; 12:00 p.m., FOX	No. 17	Creighton	W 80–73	13–3 (3–2)	16 – Jones	11 – Freemantle	5 – Scruggs	Cintas Center (10,224); Cincinnati, OH
January 19, 2022; 9:00 p.m., FS1	No. 20	at DePaul	W 68–67	14–3 (4–2)	23 – Nunge	9 – Freemantle	7 – Scruggs	Wintrust Arena (2,947); Chicago, IL
January 23, 2022; 2:00 p.m., FS1	No. 20	at Marquette	L 64–75	14–4 (4–3)	13 – Scruggs	8 – Nunge	4 – Jones	Fiserv Forum (14,658); Milwaukee, WI
January 26, 2022; 6:30 p.m., CBSSN	No. 21	No. 17 Providence	L 62–65	14–5 (4–4)	16 – Scruggs	12 – Jones	4 – Kunkel	Cintas Center (10,224); Cincinnati, OH
January 29, 2022; 2:00 p.m., FS1	No. 21	at Creighton	W 74–64	15–5 (5–4)	18 – Scruggs	9 – Jones	8 – Scruggs	CHI Health Center Omaha (17,850); Omaha, NE
February 2, 2022; 7:00 p.m., CBSSN	No. 21	Butler	W 68–66	16–5 (6–4)	23 – Freemantle	7 – Nunge	5 – Scruggs	Cintas Center (9,969); Cincinnati, OH
February 5, 2022; 7:00 p.m., FS1	No. 21	DePaul	L 65–69	16–6 (6–5)	21 – Scruggs	7 – Nunge	5 – Odom	Cintas Center (10,353); Cincinnati, OH
February 9, 2022; 7:00 p.m., FS1	No. 25	at Seton Hall	L 71–73	16–7 (6–6)	22 – Nunge	7 – Scruggs	7 – Scruggs	Prudential Center (8,730); Newark, NJ
February 11, 2022; 7:00 p.m., FS1	No. 25	No. 24 UConn; Rescheduled from December 28	W 74–68	17–7 (7–6)	22 – Nunge	9 – Tied	6 – Jones	Cintas Center (10,388); Cincinnati, OH
February 16, 2022; 6:30 p.m., CBSSN		St. John's	L 73–86	17–8 (7–7)	22 – Nunge	9 – Jones	5 – Tied	Cintas Center (10,160); Cincinnati, OH
February 19, 2022; 12:00 p.m., FOX		at No. 24 UConn	L 61–72	17–9 (7–8)	15 – Kunkel	10 – Freemantle	2 – Tied	Harry A. Gampel Pavilion (10,167); Storrs, CT
February 23, 2022; 7:00 p.m., CBSSN		at No. 11 Providence	L 92–99 ^{3OT}	17–10 (7–9)	20 – Kunkel	11 – Jones	3 – Jones	Dunkin' Donuts Center (12,400); Providence, RI
February 26, 2022; 3:30 p.m., FOX		Seton Hall	L 66–82	17–11 (7–10)	20 – Jones	10 – Jones	5 – Odom	Cintas Center (10,404); Cincinnati, OH
March 2, 2022; 6:30 p.m., FS1		at St. John's	L 66–81	17–12 (7–11)	13 – Jones	11 – Nunge	3 – Odom	Carnesecca Arena (4,352); Queens, NY
March 5, 2022; 7:15 p.m., FS1		Georgetown	W 97–75	18–12 (8–11)	25 – Johnson	9 – Nunge	8 – Kunkel	Cintas Center (10,224); Cincinnati, OH
Big East tournament
March 9, 2022; 4:30 p.m., FS1	(8)	vs. (9) Butler; First round	L 82–89 ^{OT}	18–13	24 – Nunge	13 – Freemantle	6 – Scruggs	Madison Square Garden (17,163); New York, NY
NIT tournament
March 15, 2022*; 9:00 pm, ESPNU	(2)	Cleveland State; First Round – Dayton Bracket	W 72–68	19–13	14 – Kunkel	11 – Freemantle	6 – Jones	Cintas Center (1,482); Cincinnati, OH
March 20, 2022*; 1:00 pm, ESPN	(2)	(3) Florida; Second Round – Dayton Bracket	W 72–56	20–13	16 – Johnson	8 – Nunge	5 – Jones	Cintas Center (3,437); Cincinnati, OH
March 22, 2022*; 9:00 pm, ESPN	(2)	(4) Vanderbilt; Quarterfinals – Dayton Bracket	W 75–73	21–13	16 – Freemantle	8 – Jones	4 – Tied	Cintas Center (3,240); Cincinnati, OH
March 29, 2022*; 7:00 pm, ESPN	(2)	vs. St. Bonaventure; Semifinals	W 84–77	22–13	18 – Nunge	8 – Nunge	5 – Johnson	Madison Square Garden; New York, NY
March 31, 2022*; 7:00pm, ESPN	(2)	vs. (1) Texas A&M; Championship	W 73–72	23–13	21 – Jones	11 – Nunge	4 – Nunge	Madison Square Garden; New York, NY
*Non-conference game. ^{#}Rankings from AP Poll. (#) Tournament seedings in parentheses. All times are in Eastern Time.

== Rankings ==
Ranking movements Legend: ██ Increase in ranking ██ Decrease in ranking — = Not ranked RV = Received votes
	Week																				
Poll	Pre	1	2	3	4	5	6	7	8	9	10	11	12	13	14	15	16	17	18	19	Final
AP	RV	RV	25	RV	RV	22	18	23	22	17	20	21	21	25	RV	—	—	—	—	—	Not released
Coaches	RV	RV^	RV	RV	RV	25	20	24	24	21	20	23	23	RV	RV	—	—	—	—	—	

*AP does not release post-NCAA Tournament rankings.
^Coaches do not release a Week 1 poll.

== Awards and honors ==
=== Big East Conference honors ===
==== All-Big East Honorable Mention ====
- Jack Nunge
