= 2021–22 Seton Hall Pirates men's basketball team =

American college basketball season

2021–22 Seton Hall Pirates men's basketball

NCAA tournament, first round
- Conference: Big East Conference
- Record: 21–11 (11–8 Big East)
- Head coach: Kevin Willard (12th season)
- Assistant coaches: Grant Billmeier; Duane Woodward; Donald Copeland
- Home arena: Prudential Center; Walsh Gymnasium

2021–22 Big East men's basketball standings
	Conf.				Overall
Team	W		L	PCT	W		L	PCT
No. 13 Providence	14	–	3	.824	27	–	6	.818
No. 6 Villanova †	16	–	4	.800	30	–	8	.789
No. 21 UConn	13	–	6	.684	23	–	10	.697
Creighton	12	–	7	.632	23	–	12	.657
Seton Hall	11	–	8	.579	21	–	11	.656
Marquette	11	–	8	.579	19	–	13	.594
Xavier	8	–	11	.421	23	–	13	.639
St. John's	8	–	11	.421	17	–	15	.531
Butler	6	–	14	.300	14	–	19	.424
DePaul	6	–	14	.300	15	–	16	.484
Georgetown	0	–	19	.000	6	–	25	.194
† 2022 Big East tournament winner Rankings from AP poll

The 2021–22 Seton Hall Pirates men's basketball team represented Seton Hall University in the 2021–22 NCAA Division I men's basketball season. They were led by 12th-year head coach Kevin Willard. The Pirates played their home games at the Prudential Center in Newark, New Jersey and Walsh Gymnasium in South Orange, New Jersey as members of the Big East Conference. They finished the season 21–11, 11–8 in Big East play to finish a tie for fifth place. They defeated Georgetown in the first round of the Big East tournament before losing in the quarterfinals to UConn. They received an at-large bid to the NCAA tournament as the No. 8 seed in the South region where they lost in the first round to TCU.

On March 21, 2022, head coach Kevin Willard left to become the new basketball coach at Maryland. On March 31, the school named Saint Peter's head coach and former Pirate player Shaheen Holloway the team's new coach.

== Previous season ==
In a season limited due to the ongoing COVID-19 pandemic, the Pirates finished the 2020–21 season 14–13, 10–9 in Big East play to finish in a tie for fourth place. As the No. 5 seed in the Big East tournament, they defeated St. John's in the quarterfinals before losing to Georgetown in the semifinals.

== Offseason ==
=== Departures ===
Name	Number	Pos.	Height	Weight	Year	Hometown	Reason for departure
Sandro Mamukelashvili	23	F	6'11"	240	Senior	Tbilisi, Georgia	Declared for the 2021 NBA draft; drafted by the Milwaukee Bucks
Shavar Reynolds Jr.	33	G	6'2"	185	Senior	Manchester, New Jersey	Graduate Transferred to Monmouth

=== Incoming transfers ===
Name	Number	Pos.	Height	Weight	Year	Hometown	Previous School
Kadary Richmond	0	G	6'6"	200	Sophomore	Brooklyn, New York	Transferred from Syracuse.
Alexis Yetna	10	F	6'8"	225	Graduate	Paris, France	Graduate transfer from USF.
Jamir Harris	15	G	6'2"	195	Graduate	North Brunswick, New Jersey	Graduate transfer from American.
Jo Smith	32	F	6'9"	200	Sophomore	Selma, Alabama	Transferred from Chipola College.

== Roster ==
2021–22 Seton Hall Pirates men's basketball team
Players
Coaches

Pos.	#	Name	Height	Weight	Year	Previous school	Hometown
G	0	Kadary Richmond	6 ft 6 in (1.98 m)	200 lb (91 kg)	So	Syracuse	Brooklyn, New York
G	1	Bryce Aiken	6 ft 0 in (1.83 m)	180 lb (82 kg)	GS	Harvard	Randolph, New Jersey
F	2	Tray Jackson	6 ft 10 in (2.08 m)	210 lb (95 kg)	Jr	Missouri	Detroit, Michigan
F	4	Tyrese Samuel	6 ft 10 in (2.08 m)	230 lb (104 kg)	Jr	Orangeville Prep	Montreal, Quebec
F	10	Alexis Yetna	6 ft 8 in (2.03 m)	225 lb (102 kg)	GS	South Florida	Paris, France
G/F	14	Jared Rhoden	6 ft 6 in (1.98 m)	210 lb (95 kg)	Sr	Our Saviour Lutheran School	Baldwin, New York
G	15	Jamir Harris	6 ft 2 in (1.88 m)	195 lb (88 kg)	GS	American	North Brunswick, New Jersey
G/F	20	Brandon Weston	6 ft 5 in (1.96 m)	200 lb (91 kg)	Fr	Hillcrest Prep Academy	Brooklyn, New York
C	21	Ike Obiagu	7 ft 2 in (2.18 m)	265 lb (120 kg)	GS	Florida State	Abuja, Nigeria
G/F	22	Myles Cale	6 ft 6 in (1.98 m)	210 lb (95 kg)	GS	Appoquinimink High School	Middletown, Delaware
G	23	Ryan Conway	6 ft 1 in (1.85 m)	180 lb (82 kg)	Fr	Dulaney	Baltimore, Maryland
G	25	Jahari Long	6 ft 5 in (1.96 m)	200 lb (91 kg)	So	Episcopal High School	Houston, Texas
G	30	Sylwester Granda (W)	6 ft 4 in (1.93 m)	190 lb (86 kg)	So	High School for Environmental Studies	Brooklyn, New York
F	32	Jo Smith	6 ft 9 in (2.06 m)	200 lb (91 kg)	So	Chipola	Selma, Alabama
G/F	33	Tyler Powell	6 ft 5 in (1.96 m)	220 lb (100 kg)	Fr	Ribét Academy	Los Angeles, California

Head coach

- Kevin Willard (Pittsburgh)

Assistant coach(es)

- Grant Billmeier (Seton Hall)
- Duane Woodward (Boston College)
- Donald Copeland (Seton Hall)

Legend

- (C) Team captain
- (S) Suspended
- (I) Ineligible
- (W) Walk-on
- Injured
- Current redshirt

Roster
Last update: September 20, 2021

== Schedule and results ==
Date time, TV	Rank^{#}	Opponent^{#}	Result	Record	High points	High rebounds	High assists	Site (attendance) city, state
Exhibition
November 4, 2021*; 5:00 p.m.		Misericordia	W 110–48		19 – Jackson	10 – Samuel	4 – Cale	Walsh Gymnasium (1,300); South Orange, NJ
Non-conference regular season
November 10, 2021*; 7:00 p.m., FS1		Fairleigh Dickinson	W 93–49	1–0	19 – Samuel	11 – Samuel	6 – Long	Prudential Center (8,223); Newark, NJ
November 14, 2021*; 12:00 p.m., FS1		Yale; Fort Myers Tip-Off	W 80–44	2–0	15 – Yetna	10 – Rhoden	3 – Richmond	Prudential Center (8,265); Newark, NJ
November 16, 2021*; 9:00 p.m., FS1		at No. 4 Michigan; Gavitt Tipoff Games	W 67–65	3–0	16 – Rhoden	6 – Jackson	2 – Tie	Crisler Center (12,536); Ann Arbor, MI
November 22, 2021*; 6:00 p.m., FS1	No. 21	vs. Ohio State; Fort Myers Tip-Off Beach Division semifinals	L 76–79	3–1	29 – Rhoden	5 – Rhoden	3 – Richmond	Suncoast Credit Union Arena (2,937); Fort Myers, FL
November 24, 2021*; 6:00 p.m., FS1	No. 21	vs. California; Fort Myers Tip-Off Beach Division consolation	W 62–59	4–1	21 – Rhoden	7 – 2 Tied	2 – Aiken	Suncoast Credit Union Arena (3,500); Fort Myers, FL
November 28, 2021*; 12:00 p.m., FS1	No. 21	Bethune–Cookman	W 84–70	5–1	18 – Rhoden	13 – Yetna	6 – Richmond	Prudential Center (8,913); Newark, NJ
December 1, 2021*; 7:00 p.m., FS2	No. 25	Wagner	W 85–63	6–1	15 – 2 Tied	11 – Rhoden	9 – Richmond	Prudential Center (8,136); Newark, NJ
December 4, 2021*; 12:00 p.m., FS2	No. 25	Nyack	W 113–67	7–1	23 – Harris	12 – Samuel	8 – Richmond	Walsh Gymnasium (1,119); South Orange, NJ
December 9, 2021*; 6:30 p.m., FS1	No. 23	No. 7 Texas; Big East–Big 12 Battle	W 64–60	8–1	18 – Rhoden	11 – Yetna	3 – Aiken	Prudential Center (10,481); Newark, NJ
December 12, 2021*; 7:30 p.m., FS1	No. 23	Rutgers; Rivalry/Garden State Hardwood Classic	W 77–63	9–1	22 – Aiken	9 – 2 Tied	4 – Yetna	Prudential Center (11,606); Newark, NJ
December 18, 2021*; 3:00 p.m., FS2	No. 16	vs. Iona; Gotham Classic	Canceled due to COVID-19 issues					Madison Square Garden; New York, NY
Big East regular season
December 29, 2021; 7:00 p.m., FS1	No. 15	at No. 21 Providence	L 65–70	9–2 (0–1)	13 – Yetna	11 – Yetna	4 – Aiken	Dunkin' Donuts Center (12,069); Providence, RI
January 1, 2022; 2:00 p.m., CBS	No. 15	No. 22 Villanova	L 67–73	9–3 (0–2)	22 – Aiken	8 – Yetna	4 – Richmond	Prudential Center (13,625); Newark, NJ
January 4, 2022; 8:00 p.m., CBSSN	No. 24	at Butler	W 71–56	10–3 (1–2)	17 – Rhoden	10 – Yetna	7 – Aiken	Hinkle Fieldhouse (7,234); Indianapolis, IN
January 8, 2022; 12:00 p.m., FOX	No. 24	UConn	W 90–87 ^{OT}	11–3 (2–2)	22 – Aiken	7 – Samuel	7 – Aiken	Prudential Center (10,977); Newark, NJ
January 13, 2022; 5:00 p.m., FS1	No. 20	at DePaul rescheduled from Dec. 23	L 92–96	11–4 (2–3)	25 – Rhoden	10 – Obiagu	6 – Richmond	Wintrust Arena (2,255); Chicago, IL
January 15, 2022; 12:00 p.m., FS1	No. 20	at Marquette	L 72–73	11–5 (2–4)	28 – Aiken	16 – Yetna	3 – Richmond	Fiserv Forum (13,647); Milwaukee, WI
January 18, 2022; 8:00 p.m., FS1		No. 21 Providence	Canceled					Prudential Center; Newark, NJ
January 22, 2022; 12:00 p.m., FS1		at St. John's	W 66–60	12–5 (3–4)	21 – Cale	15 – Yetna	8 – Richmond	Madison Square Garden (6,692); New York, NY
January 24, 2022; 9:00 p.m., FS1		St. John's rescheduled from December 20	L 63–84	12–6 (3–5)	16 – Cale	12 – Rhoden	4 – Richmond	Walsh Gymnasium (1,316); South Orange, NJ
January 26, 2022; 5:00 p.m., FS1		No. 22 Marquette	L 63–73	12–7 (3–6)	16 – Harris	10 – Obiagu	4 – Richmond	Prudential Center (8,746); Newark, NJ
February 1, 2022; 8:40 p.m., FS1		at Georgetown	W 70–63	13–7 (4–6)	21 – Jackson	8 – Richmond	7 – Richmond	Capital One Arena (3,462); Washington, D.C.
February 4, 2022; 7:00 p.m., FS1		Creighton	W 74–55	14–7 (5–6)	14 – Richmond	8 – Yetna	7 – Richmond	Prudential Center (9,062); Newark, NJ
February 9, 2022; 7:00 p.m., FS1		No. 25 Xavier	W 73–71	15–7 (6–6)	25 – Rhoden	8 – Tied	5 – Richmond	Prudential Center (8,730); Newark, NJ
February 12, 2022; 1:00 p.m., FOX		at No. 15 Villanova	L 67–73	15–8 (6–7)	16 – Tied	15 – Yetna	5 – Richmond	Wells Fargo Center (17,803); Philadelphia, Pennsylvania
February 16, 2022; 8:30 p.m., CBSSN		at No. 24 UConn	L 65–70	15–9 (6–8)	15 – Harris	8 – Yetna	4 – Richmond	Harry A. Gampel Pavilion (10,167); Storrs, CT
February 19, 2022; 8:00 p.m., FS1		DePaul	W 66–64	16–9 (7–8)	18 – Rhoden	18 – Rhoden	5 – Richmond	Prudential Center (9,965); Newark, NJ
February 23, 2022; 8:30 p.m., FS1		Butler	W 66–60	17–9 (8–8)	17 – Rhoden	10 – Yetna	4 – Harris	Prudential Center (8,705); Newark, NJ
February 26, 2022; 3:30 p.m., FOX		at Xavier	W 82–66	18–9 (9–8)	30 – Rhoden	7 – Samuel	7 – Richmond	Cintas Center (10,404); Cincinnati, OH
March 2, 2022; 7:05 p.m., CBSSN		Georgetown	W 73–68	19–9 (10–8)	16 – Rhoden	7 – Yetna	10 – Richmond	Prudential Center (9,635); Newark, NJ
March 5, 2022; 2:30 p.m., FOX		at Creighton	W 65–60	20–9 (11–8)	19 – Rhoden	11 – Yetna	3 – Rhoden	CHI Health Center Omaha (17,221); Omaha, NE
Big East tournament
March 9, 2022; 10:10 p.m., FS1	(6)	vs. (11) Georgetown; First Round	W 57–53	21–9	17 – Rhoden	11 – Yetna	3 – Richmond	Madison Square Garden (17,163); New York, NY
March 10, 2022; 9:30 p.m., FS1	(6)	vs. (3) No. 20 UConn; Quarterfinals	L 52–62	21–10	17 – Cale	6 – Tied	2 – Yetna	Madison Square Garden (19,812); New York, NY
NCAA tournament
March 18, 2022; 9:57 p.m., TruTV	(8 S)	vs. (9 S) TCU; First Round	L 42–69	21–11	11 – Cale	5 – Obiagu	4 – Richmond	Viejas Arena (11,399); San Diego, CA
*Non-conference game. ^{#}Rankings from AP Poll. (#) Tournament seedings in parentheses. All times are in Eastern Time.

== Rankings ==
Ranking movements Legend: ██ Increase in ranking ██ Decrease in ranking — = Not ranked RV = Received votes
	Week																				
Poll	Pre	1	2	3	4	5	6	7	8	9	10	11	12	13	14	15	16	17	18	19	Final
AP	—	RV	21	25	23	16	15	15	24	20											
Coaches	—	—*	20	RV	25	16	15	13	22	18											

== Awards and honors ==
=== Big East Conference honors ===
==== All-Big East First Team ====
- Jared Rhoden
