= 2021–22 DePaul Blue Demons men's basketball team =

DePaul Blue Demons men's basketball

2021–22 DePaul Blue Demons men's basketball
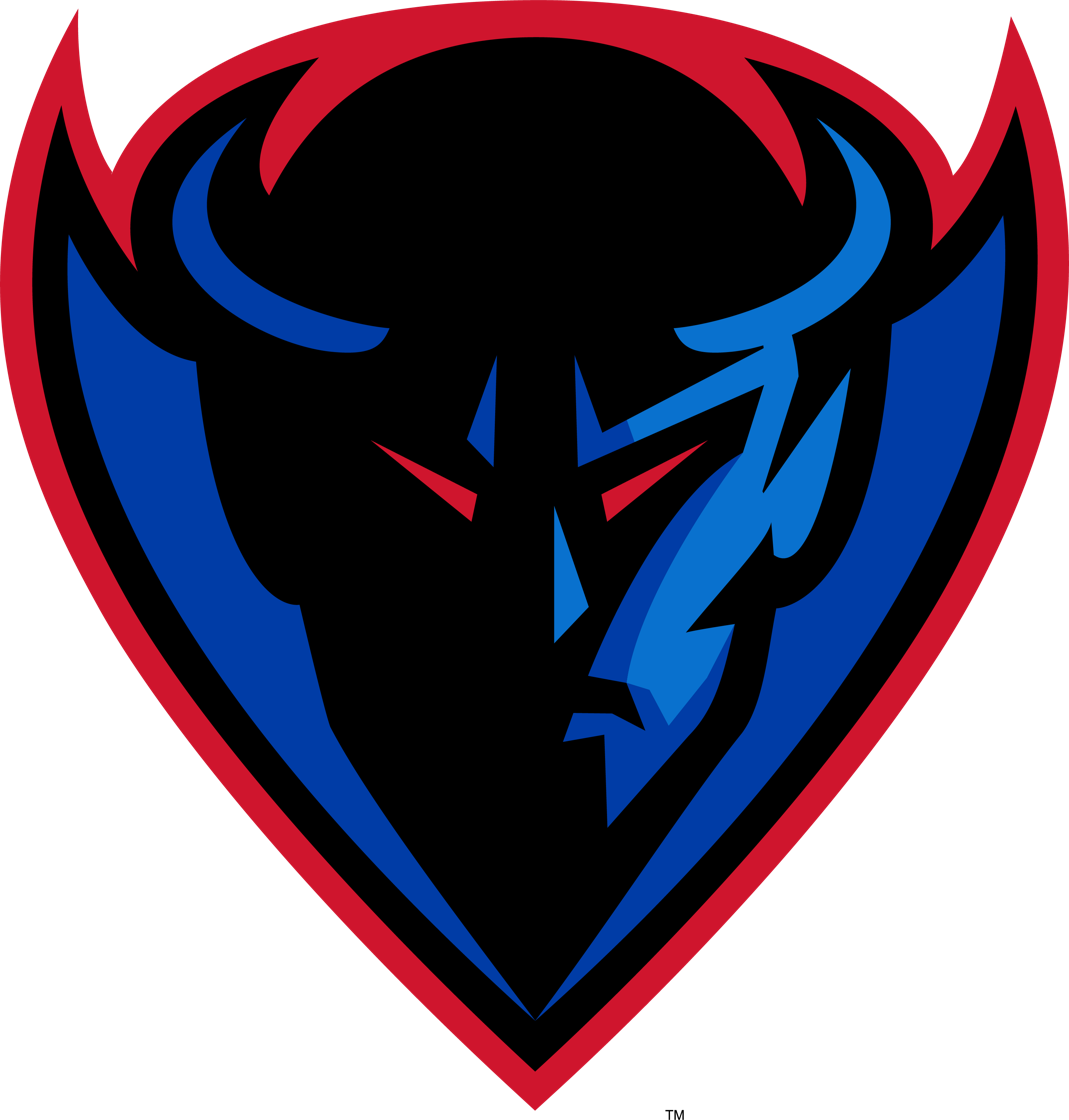
- Conference: Big East Conference
- Record: 15–16 (6–14 Big East)
- Head coach: Tony Stubblefield (1st season)
- Assistant coaches: Paris Parham (1st season); Bino Ranson (1st season); Steve Thomas (1st season)
- Home arena: Wintrust Arena

2021–22 Big East men's basketball standings
	Conf.				Overall
Team	W		L	PCT	W		L	PCT
No. 13 Providence	14	–	3	.824	27	–	6	.818
No. 6 Villanova †	16	–	4	.800	30	–	8	.789
No. 21 UConn	13	–	6	.684	23	–	10	.697
Creighton	12	–	7	.632	23	–	12	.657
Seton Hall	11	–	8	.579	21	–	11	.656
Marquette	11	–	8	.579	19	–	13	.594
Xavier	8	–	11	.421	23	–	13	.639
St. John's	8	–	11	.421	17	–	15	.531
Butler	6	–	14	.300	14	–	19	.424
DePaul	6	–	14	.300	15	–	16	.484
Georgetown	0	–	19	.000	6	–	25	.194
† 2022 Big East tournament winner Rankings from AP poll

The 2021–22 DePaul Blue Demons men's basketball team represented DePaul University during the 2021–22 NCAA Division I men's basketball season. They were led by first year head coach Tony Stubblefield and played their home games at Wintrust Arena in Chicago, Illinois as members of the Big East Conference.

== Previous season ==
In a season limited due to the ongoing COVID-19 pandemic, the Blue Demons finished the 2020–21 season 5–14, 2–13 in Big East play to finish in last place. They defeated Providence in the first round of the Big East tournament before losing to UConn in the quarterfinals.

After finishing in last place in the Big East for a fifth consecutive year, the school fired head coach Dave Leitao on March 15, 2021. On April 1, the school named long-time Oregon assistant Stubblefield the team's new head coach.

== Offseason ==
=== Departures ===
DePaul Departures
Name	Number	Pos.	Height	Weight	Year	Hometown	Reason for departure
Markese Jacobs	0	G	5'11"	185	Sophomore	Chicago, IL	Transferred
Romeo Weems	1	F	6'7"	215	Sophomore	Detroit, MI	Declare for 2021 NBA draft
Jaylen Butz	2	F	6'9"	224	Senior	Fort Wayne, IN	Graduate transferred to Western Kentucky
Kobe Elvis	3	G	6'2"	170	Freshman	Brampton, ON	Transferred to Dayton
Keon Edwards	5	F	6'7"	185	Freshman	Pasadena, TX	Transferred to Nebraska
Ray Salnave	10	G	6'3"	205	Senior	Elmont, NY	Graduate transferred to UMBC
Charlie Moore	11	G	5'11"	180	RS Senior	Chicago, IL	Graduate transferred to Miami (FL)
Jason Malonga	12	G	6'4"	195	Senior	Bolingbrook, IL	Walk-on; graduated
Darious Hall	13	F	6'7"	205	RS Junior	Little Rock, AR	Transferred to Central Arkansas
Oscar Lopez Jr.	15	G	6'4"	200	Sophomore	Cypress, CA	Transferred to Central Michigan
Pauly Paulicap	33	F	6'8"	225	Senior	Elmont, NY	Graduate transferred to West Virginia
Pantelis Xidias	35	G	5'10"	165	Senior	Michigan City, IN	Walk-on; graduated

=== Incoming transfers ===
Name	Number	Pos.	Height	Weight	Year	Hometown	Previous School
Jalen Terry	3	G	6'0"	165	Sophomore	Flint, MI	Oregon
Philmon Gebrewhit	5	G	6'7"	190	RS Junior	Boston, MA	South Plains College
Yor Anei	10	F	6'10"	220	Senior	Overland Park, KS	SMU
Tyon Grant-Foster	13	G	6'7"	205	Senior	Kansas City, KS	Kansas
Brandon Johnson	35	F	6'8"	220	Graduate Student	Chicago, IL	Minnesota
Shaheed Medlock	55	G	6'5"	196	Graduate Student	Chicago, IL	Georgia Tech

=== 2021 recruiting class ===
College recruiting
Name	Hometown	School	Height	Weight	Commit date
Ahamad Bynum #17 SG	Chicago, IL	Simeon Career Academy	6 ft 2 in (1.88 m)	175 lb (79 kg)	Nov 17, 2019
Ahamad Bynum #17 SG	Recruit ratings: Scout: Rivals: 247Sports: ESPN: (84)				
Overall recruit ranking:
Note: In many cases, Scout, Rivals, 247Sports, On3, and ESPN may conflict in their listings of height and weight.; In these cases, the average was taken. ESPN grades are on a 100-point scale.; Sources: "2021 DePaul Signees". Rivals.; "2021 DePaul Signees". ESPN.; "2021 Team Ranking". Rivals.

== Roster ==
2021–22 DePaul Blue Demons men's basketball team
Players
Coaches

Pos.	#	Name	Height	Weight	Year	Previous school	Hometown
G	3	Jalen Terry	6 ft 0 in (1.83 m)	165 lb (75 kg)	So	Beecher; Oregon	Flint, MI
G	4	Javon Freeman-Liberty	6 ft 4 in (1.93 m)	180 lb (82 kg)	Sr	Whitney Young; Valparaiso	Chicago, IL
G	5	Philmon Gebrewhit	6 ft 7 in (2.01 m)	190 lb (86 kg)	RS Jr	Holderness School; South Plains College	Boston, MA
F	10	Yor Anei	6 ft 10 in (2.08 m)	220 lb (100 kg)	Sr	Lee's Summit West; SMU	Overland Park, KS
G	12	Ahamad Bynum	6 ft 3 in (1.91 m)	180 lb (82 kg)	Fr	Simeon	Chicago, IL
G	13	Tyon Grant-Foster	6 ft 7 in (2.01 m)	205 lb (93 kg)	Sr	Schlagle; Kansas	Kansas City, KS
C	14	Nick Ongenda	6 ft 11 in (2.11 m)	210 lb (95 kg)	Jr	Southwest Christian Academy (AR)	Mississauga, Ontario
G	20	Brendan Favre (W)	6 ft 5 in (1.96 m)	170 lb (77 kg)	Sr	IMG Academy (FL)	Vevey, Switzerland
G	23	Courvoisier McCauley	6 ft 5 in (1.96 m)	211 lb (96 kg)	RS Sr	Emmerich Manual; Lincoln Memorial	Indianapolis, IN
G	30	Max Williams (W)	6 ft 2 in (1.88 m)	190 lb (86 kg)	So	IMG Academy (FL)	Chicago, IL
F	32	David Jones	6 ft 6 in (1.98 m)	195 lb (88 kg)	So	Teays Valley Christian (WV)	Santo Domingo, DR
F	35	Brandon Johnson	6 ft 8 in (2.03 m)	220 lb (100 kg)	GS	Thea Bowman; Minnesota	Chicago, IL
G	45	Shaheed Medlock	6 ft 5 in (1.96 m)	196 lb (89 kg)	GS	Ware County; Georgia Tech	Chicago, IL

Head coach

- Tony Stubblefield (Omaha)

Assistant coach(es)

- Paris Parham (Minnesota State)
- Bino Ranson (Southern New Hampshire)
- Steve Thomas (Rowan)

Legend

- (C) Team captain
- (S) Suspended
- (I) Ineligible
- (W) Walk-on
- Injured
- Current redshirt

Roster

== Schedule and results ==
DePaul experience positive COVID-19 tests prior to its scheduled game against Northwestern on December 18, 2021, resulting in the cancellation of the game.

Date time, TV	Rank^{#}	Opponent^{#}	Result	Record	High points	High rebounds	High assists	Site (attendance) city, state
Exhibition
November 4, 2021*; 7:30 p.m.		Montevallo	W 67–63	–	15 – Grant-Foster	12 – Freeman-Liberty	4 – Freeman-Liberty	Wintrust Arena (2,340); Chicago, IL
Non-conference regular season
November 10, 2021*; 8:00 p.m., FS1		Coppin State	W 97–72	1–0	25 – Freeman-Liberty	17 – Jones	8 – Freeman-Liberty	Wintrust Arena (2,662); Chicago, IL
November 13, 2021*; 5:00 p.m., FS2		Central Michigan	W 99–66	2–0	22 – Freeman-Liberty	9 – Jones	7 – Freeman-Liberty	Wintrust Arena (2,466); Chicago, IL
November 18, 2021*; 7:30 p.m., FS1		Rutgers; Gavitt Tipoff Games	W 73–70	3–0	22 – Jones	13 – Johnson	3 – Johnson	Wintrust Arena (2,844); Chicago, IL
November 20, 2021*; 7:00 p.m., FS2		Western Illinois; Blue Demon Classic	W 84–80	4–0	33 – Freeman-Liberty	11 – Freeman-Liberty	4 – Freeman-Liberty	Wintrust Arena (2,642); Chicago, IL
November 26, 2021*; 4:00 p.m., FS2		Northern Kentucky; Blue Demon Classic	W 77–68	5–0	20 – Freeman-Liberty	12 – Freeman-Liberty	4 – Terry	Wintrust Arena (2,465); Chicago, IL
November 28, 2021*; 1:00 p.m., FS1		Eastern Michigan; Blue Demon Classic	W 101–63	6–0	22 – Freeman-Liberty	7 – Johnson	5 – Jones	Wintrust Arena (2,194); Chicago, IL
December 4, 2021*; 3:00 p.m., FS1		Loyola–Chicago	L 64–68	6–1	19 – Jones	9 – Jones	3 – Gebrewhit	Wintrust Arena (6,774); Chicago, IL
December 7, 2021*; 7:30 p.m., FS1		Duquesne	W 87–67	7–1	25 – Freeman-Liberty	11 – Anei	5 – Freeman-Liberty	Wintrust Arena (2,442); Chicago, IL
December 10, 2021*; 7:00 p.m., ACCN		at Louisville	W 62–55	8–1	33 – Jones	14 – Jones	2 – 3 Tied	KFC Yum! Center (13,127); Louisville, KY
December 14, 2021*; 7:00 p.m., ESPN+		at UIC	W 72–66	9–1	27 – Freeman-Liberty	9 – Jones	3 – Freeman-Liberty	Credit Union 1 Arena (2,789); Chicago, IL
December 18, 2021*; 2:00 p.m., BTN		at Northwestern	Canceled due to COVID-19 issues					Welsh–Ryan Arena; Evanston, IL
Big East regular season
December 29, 2021; 4:00 p.m., FS1		at Butler	L 59–63	9–2 (0–1)	16 – B. Johnson	12 – B. Johnson	5 – Freeman-Liberty	Hinkle Fieldhouse (7,655); Indianapolis, IN
January 1, 2022; 2:00 p.m., FOX		No. 21 Providence	L 53–70	9–3 (0–2)	22 – Freeman-Liberty	8 – Jones	2 – Gebrewhit	Wintrust Arena (2,956); Chicago, IL
January 5, 2022; 5:30 p.m., FS1		at St. John's	L 84–89	9–4 (0–3)	24 – Freeman-Liberty	8 – Terry	6 – Terry	Carnesecca Arena (3,429); Queens, NY
January 8, 2022; 1:00 p.m., FOX		No. 19 Villanova	L 64–79	9–5 (0–4)	34 – Freeman-Liberty	10 – Johnson	4 – Terry	Wintrust Arena (3,839); Chicago, IL
January 11, 2022; 6:00 p.m., FS1		at Marquette	L 76–87	9–6 (0–5)	24 – Freeman-Liberty	11 – Anei	4 – Gebrewhit	Fiserv Forum (12,106); Milwaukee, WI
January 13, 2022; 4:00 p.m., FS1		No. 20 Seton Hall; Rescheduled from December 23	W 96–92	10–6 (1–5)	28 – Terry	8 – Anei	2 – 3 Tied	Wintrust Arena (2,255); Chicago, IL
January 19, 2022; 8:00 p.m., FS1		No. 20 Xavier	L 67–68	10–7 (1–6)	26 – Jones	10 – Anei	8 – Terry	Wintrust Arena (2,947); Chicago, IL
January 22, 2022; 4:30 p.m., CBSSN		at Creighton	L 47–60	10–8 (1–7)	12 – Terry	6 – Terry	3 – Terry	CHI Health Center Omaha (16,854); Omaha, NE
January 25, 2022; 4:00 p.m., FS1		at No. 14 Villanova	L 43–67	10–9 (1–8)	16 – J. Johnson	6 – Anei	3 – Terry	Finneran Pavilion (6,501); Villanova, PA
January 29, 2022; 5:30 p.m., FS1		No. 20 UConn	L 50–57	10–10 (1–9)	18 – J. Johnson	8 – Tied	2 – Anei	Wintrust Arena (4,376); Chicago, IL
February 5, 2022; 6:00 p.m., FS1		at No. 21 Xavier	W 69–65	11–10 (2–9)	21 – McCauley	8 – Tied	3 – McCauley	Cintas Center (10,353); Cincinnati, OH
February 9, 2022; 8:00 p.m., FS1		Georgetown	W 82–74	12–10 (3–9)	22 – Jones	14 – Jones	10 – Jones	Wintrust Arena (2,767); Chicago, IL
February 12, 2022; 5:30 p.m., FS1		at No. 11 Providence	L 73–76 ^{OT}	12–11 (3–10)	19 – Jones	10 – Jones	5 – Terry	Dunkin' Donuts Center (12,810); Provdience, RI
February 15, 2022; 8:00 p.m., FS1		Butler	L 71–73	12–12 (3–11)	17 – Jones	9 – Johnson	4 – Tied	Wintrust Arena (2,687); Chicago, IL
February 17, 2022; 9:00 p.m., CBSSN		Creighton; Rescheduled from December 20	L 59–71	12–13 (3–12)	18 – Freeman-Liberty	13 – Freeman-Liberty	2 – Tied	Wintrust Arena (2,561); Chicago, IL
February 19, 2022; 7:00 p.m., FS1		at Seton Hall	L 64–66	12–14 (3–13)	22 – Freeman-Liberty	11 – McCauley	4 – Freeman-Liberty	Prudential Center (9,695); Newark, NJ
February 24, 2022; 7:05 p.m., CBSSN		at Georgetown	W 68–65	13–14 (4–13)	25 – Freeman-Liberty	10 – Johnson	6 – Terry	Capital One Arena (4,028); Washington, D.C.
February 27, 2022; 4:00 p.m., FS1		St. John's	W 99–94	14–14 (5–13)	39 – Freeman-Liberty	10 – Jones	5 – Jones	Wintrust Arena (3,735); Chicago, IL
March 2, 2022; 8:00 p.m., CBSSN		Marquette	W 91–80	15–14 (6–13)	26 – Freeman-Liberty	9 – Freeman-Liberty	5 – Freeman-Liberty	Wintrust Arena (6,024); Chicago, IL
March 5, 2022; 4:00 p.m., FOX		at No. 18 UConn	L 68–75	15–15 (6–14)	22 – Freeman-Liberty	8 – Jones	4 – Terry	Harry A. Gampel Pavilion (10,167); Storrs, CT
Big East tournament
March 9, 2022; 6:00 p.m., FS1	(10)	vs. (7) St. John's; First round	L 73–92	15–16	17 – Freeman-Liberty	8 – Ongenda	5 – Freeman-Liberty	Madison Square Garden (17,163); New York, NY
*Non-conference game. ^{#}Rankings from AP Poll. (#) Tournament seedings in parentheses. All times are in Central Time.

== Awards and honors ==
=== Big East Conference honors ===
==== All-Big East Second Team ====
- Javon Freeman-Liberty
