= Vilnius Minties Gymnasium =

High school in Lithuania

Coordinates: 54°40′36″N 25°12′13″E

Vilnius Minties Gymnasium Lithuanian: Vilniaus "Minties" gimnazija
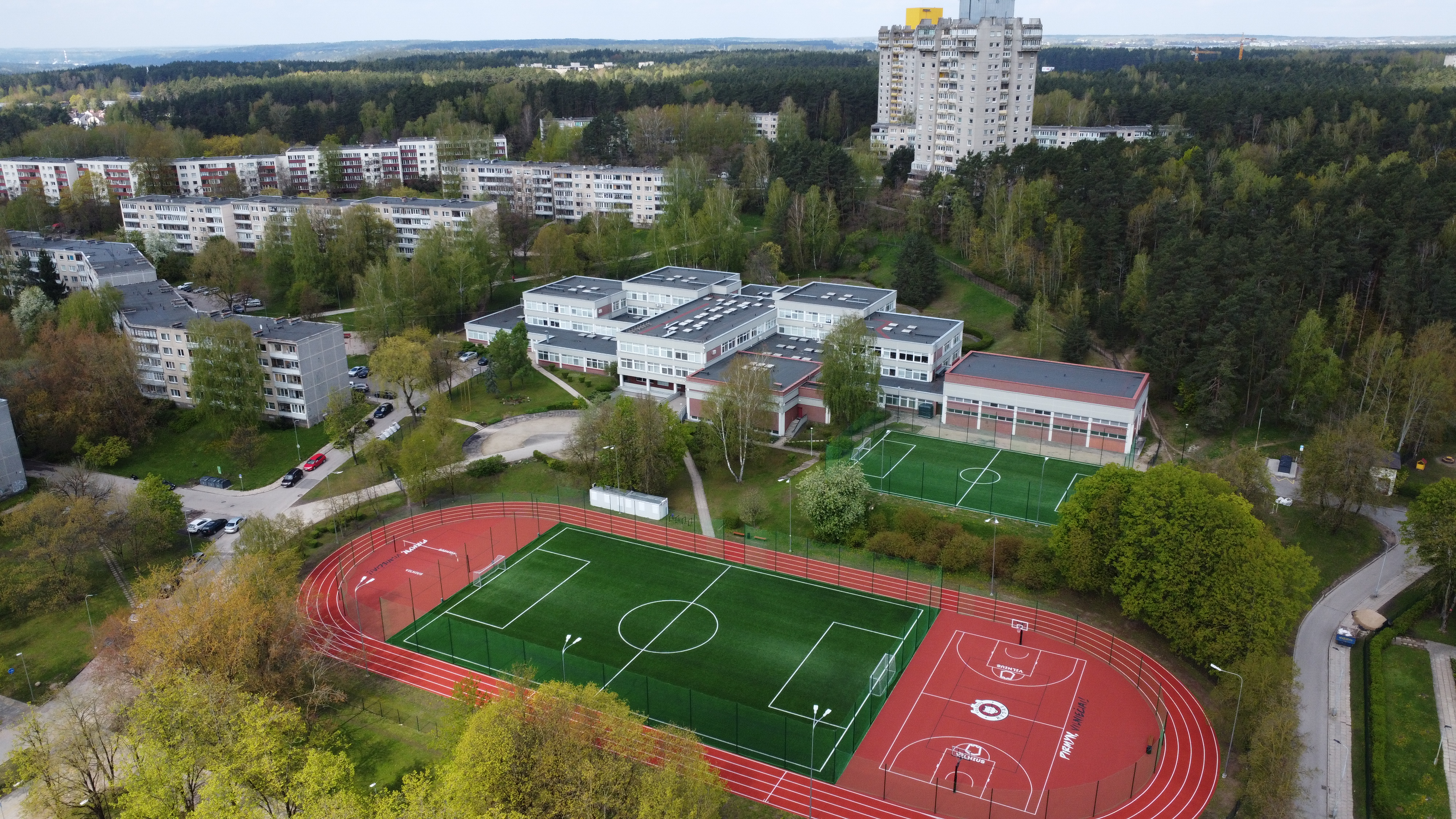

Information
- Established: 1974; 51 years ago
- Teaching staff: c.80
- Website: vilniausminties.lt

Vilnius "Minties" gymnasium (Lithuanian: Vilniaus "Minties" gimnazija) is a 4-year high school in Lazdynai microdistrict, Vilnius, Lithuania. It focuses on teaching mathematics and informatics.

It was built in 1974 and was named as the 40th Vilnius high school. In 1994 it was renamed as Minties (English: thought) high school. In 2003 it was decided to turn the school into a four-year gymnasium. In 2005, 92 students graduated and 83% of them continue their education at various universities and colleges. About 80 teachers work in the gymnasium.
