= 2021–22 Georgetown Hoyas men's basketball team =

American college basketball season

2021–22 Georgetown Hoyas men's basketball
- Conference: Big East
- Record: 6–25 (0–19 Big East)
- Head coach: Patrick Ewing (5th season)
- Assistant coaches: Louis Orr; Robert Kirby; Akbar Waheed
- Captain: Donald Carey
- Home arena: Capital One Arena

2021–22 Big East men's basketball standings
	Conf.				Overall
Team	W		L	PCT	W		L	PCT
No. 13 Providence	14	–	3	.824	27	–	6	.818
No. 6 Villanova †	16	–	4	.800	30	–	8	.789
No. 21 UConn	13	–	6	.684	23	–	10	.697
Creighton	12	–	7	.632	23	–	12	.657
Seton Hall	11	–	8	.579	21	–	11	.656
Marquette	11	–	8	.579	19	–	13	.594
Xavier	8	–	11	.421	23	–	13	.639
St. John's	8	–	11	.421	17	–	15	.531
Butler	6	–	14	.300	14	–	19	.424
DePaul	6	–	14	.300	15	–	16	.484
Georgetown	0	–	19	.000	6	–	25	.194
† 2022 Big East tournament winner Rankings from AP poll

The 2021–22 Georgetown Hoyas men's basketball team represented Georgetown University in the 2021–22 NCAA Division I men's basketball season. The Hoyas, led by fifth-year head coach Patrick Ewing, were members of the Big East Conference. The Hoyas played their home games at Capital One Arena in Washington, D.C.

Despite having won the 2021 Big East men's basketball tournament and a highly ranked 2021–2022 recruiting class, the Hoyas had a historically bad season. Winning their last game on December 15 and posting a 6–25 record overall, they went winless in Big East competition, finishing in last place in the regular season with a record of 0–19, and lost in the first round of the 2022 Big East men's basketball tournament. Georgetown's second-worst season by winning percentage, it set a school record for losses overall and a school and conference record for conference losses in a season, and it began a school-record losing streak that remained active at the end of the season. It was the first winless conference season in Georgetown history and the first last-place conference finish for the school in the combined history of the original Big East Conference of 1979–2013 and the new Big East Conference founded in 2013. It was the only Georgetown team to finish in last place in conference play other than the 1934–1935 team, which finished in last place in the Eastern Intercollegiate Conference.

== Previous season ==
Due to the COVID-19 pandemic, the Hoyas played a reduced non-conference schedule and had four conference games canceled during the 2020–2021 season. They posted a final record of 13–13, 7–9 in Big East play, and finished in eighth place in the conference. In the Big East tournament, they defeated Marquette, Villanova, and Seton Hall to advance to the tournament championship game. In the championship, they defeated Creighton for the school's first tournament championship since 2007. As a result, the Hoyas received the conference's automatic bid to the NCAA tournament, their first NCAA tournament appearance since 2015. As the No. 12 seed in the East region, they lost in the first round to Colorado.

== Offseason ==
=== Departures ===
Name	Number	Pos.	Height	Weight	Year	Hometown	Reason
Jahvon Blair	0	G	6'4"	190	Senior	Brampton, ON	Graduated
Jamorko Pickett	1	G/F	6'9"	206	Senior	Washington, D.C.	Graduated
Jalen Harris	3	PG	6'2"	166	Graduate Student	Wilson, NC	Left team after 5 games for "family reasons"
Chudier Bile	4	F	6'7"	195	Graduate Student	Denver, CO	Entered NBA draft
Jamari Sibley	14	F	6'8"	200	Freshman	Milwaukee, WI	Transferred to UTEP
T. J. Berger	20	G	6'4"	170	Freshman	West Chester, PA	Transferred to San Diego
Jaden Robinson	22	G	6'3"	180	Junior	Baltimore, MD	Did not return for fourth walk-on season
Qudus Wahab	34	C	6'11"	237	Sophomore	Lagos, Nigeria	Transferred to Maryland

NOTE: Chudier Bile, Jahvon Blair, and Jamorko Pickett all declared for the 2021 NBA draft after a four-year college career, opting not take advantage of the special fifth year of eligibility the NCAA granted because of the COVID-19 pandemic.

=== Incoming transfers ===
Name	Number	Pos.	Height	Weight	Year	Hometown	Previous school
Wayne Bristol Jr.	31	G	6'6"	205	Junior	Upper Marlboro, MD	Howard
Tre King	1	F	6'7"	235	Senior	Lexington, KY	Eastern Kentucky
Kaiden Rice	11	G/F	6'7"	215	Graduate Student	Columbia, SC	The Citadel

NOTES: Tre King was dismissed from the university before the season began. Wayne Bristol transferred to Georgetown in midseason, and Georgetown announced his addition to the roster on January 27.

=== 2021 recruiting class ===
College recruiting
Name	Hometown	School	Height	Weight	Commit date
Tyler Beard; CG	Chatham, VA	Hargrave Military Academy	6 ft 2 in (1.88 m)	175 lb (79 kg)	Jan 28, 2020
Tyler Beard; CG	Recruit ratings: Scout: Rivals: 247Sports: (79)				
Jalin Billingsley; PF	Cleveland, OH	Lutheran East	6 ft 7 in (2.01 m)	195 lb (88 kg)	Jan 8, 2020
Jalin Billingsley; PF	Recruit ratings: Scout: Rivals: 247Sports: (79)				
Aminu Mohammed; SG	Springfield, MO	Greenwood Laboratory School	6 ft 5 in (1.96 m)	190 lb (86 kg)	Dec 21, 2020
Aminu Mohammed; SG	Recruit ratings: Scout: Rivals: 247Sports: (90)				
Ryan Mutombo; C	Atlanta, GA	Lovett School	6 ft 11 in (2.11 m)	235 lb (107 kg)	Apr 10, 2020
Ryan Mutombo; C	Recruit ratings: Scout: Rivals: 247Sports: (81)				
Jordan Riley; SG	Brentwood, NY	Brentwood	6 ft 4 in (1.93 m)	195 lb (88 kg)	Jul 24, 2020
Jordan Riley; SG	Recruit ratings: Scout: Rivals: 247Sports: (82)				
Overall recruit ranking:
Note: In many cases, Scout, Rivals, 247Sports, On3, and ESPN may conflict in their listings of height and weight.; In these cases, the average was taken. ESPN grades are on a 100-point scale.; Sources: "2021 Team Ranking". Rivals.

== Roster ==
2021–22 Georgetown Hoyas men's basketball team
Players
Coaches

Pos.	#	Name	Height	Weight	Year	Previous school	Hometown
G	0	Aminu Mohammed	6 ft 5 in (1.96 m)	210 lb (95 kg)	Fr	Greenwood Laboratory School	Temple Hills, MD
G	2	Dante Harris	6 ft 0 in (1.83 m)	170 lb (77 kg)	So	Lakeway Christian Academy	Washington, D.C.
G	3	Tyler Beard	6 ft 2 in (1.88 m)	180 lb (82 kg)	Fr	Hargrave Military Academy	Chicago, IL
F	4	Jalin Billingsley	6 ft 8 in (2.03 m)	225 lb (102 kg)	Fr	Lutheran HS East	Cleveland, OH
C	5	Timothy Ighoefe	7 ft 0 in (2.13 m)	250 lb (113 kg)	Jr	NBA Academy Africa	Lagos, Nigeria
G	10	Chuma Azinge (W)	6 ft 3 in (1.91 m)	183 lb (83 kg)	Jr	Choate Rosemary Hall	San Marino, CA
G/F	11	Kaiden Rice	6 ft 7 in (2.01 m)	215 lb (98 kg)	GS	The Citadel	Columbia, SC
G	12	Jordan Riley	6 ft 4 in (1.93 m)	195 lb (88 kg)	Fr	Brentwood HS	Brentwood, NY
G	13	Donald Carey (C)	6 ft 5 in (1.96 m)	187 lb (85 kg)	Sr	Siena	Upper Marlboro, MD
C	21	Ryan Mutombo	7 ft 2 in (2.18 m)	252 lb (114 kg)	Fr	The Lovett School	Atlanta, GA
F	23	Collin Holloway	6 ft 6 in (1.98 m)	220 lb (100 kg)	So	Port Allen HS	Baton Rouge, LA
F	24	Kobe Clark	6 ft 6 in (1.98 m)	180 lb (82 kg)	So	Vashon HS	St. Louis, MO
G	31	Wayne Bristol Jr.	6 ft 6 in (1.98 m)	205 lb (93 kg)	Jr	Howard	Upper Marlboro, MD
C	32	Malcolm Wilson	7 ft 0 in (2.13 m)	205 lb (93 kg)	RS Jr	Ridge View HS	Columbia, SC
F	55	Victor Muresan (W)	6 ft 10 in (2.08 m)	190 lb (86 kg)	So	Georgetown Day School	Potomac, MD

Head coach

- Patrick Ewing (Georgetown)

Assistant coach(es)

- Louis Orr (Syracuse)
- Robert Kirby (UTRGV)
- Akbar Waheed (Niagara)

Legend

- (C) Team captain
- (S) Suspended
- (I) Ineligible
- (W) Walk-on
- Injured
- Current redshirt

Roster

Notes: Chuma Azinge was a recruited walk-on. Wayne Bristol transferred to Georgetown in midseason, and Georgetown announced his addition to the roster on January 27.

== Season recap ==
Since Georgetown's run to the 2021 Big East tournament championship and appearance in the 2021 NCAA tournament, the team had lost seven players. Graduate transfer point guard Jalen Harris, who played only five games with the Hoyas in 2020–2021 before taking a leave of absence for "family reasons", never returned to Georgetown. Senior guard Jahvon Blair, the team's leading scorer, and four-year starting guard/forward Jamorko Pickett had both graduated and graduate student Chudier Bile, a forward who after a slow start had played a large role in Georgetown's late-season resurgence in 2020–2021, also had departed, all three foregoing their COVID-19 pandemic-related fifth year of collegiate eligibility to enter the 2020 NBA draft. On April 14, 2021, moreover, the NCAA had approved a new transfer rule allowing Division I players to transfer once during their college careers and begin play immediately for their new schools, repealing a rule instituted in the 1960s requiring a transferring player to sit out two semesters before resuming play, and this removed a major disincentive to transferring. Sophomore starting center Qudus Wahab, who Ewing had said could be Georgetown's next dominating "big man", had surprised sports pundits and fans by transferring to Maryland. Two freshman who had seen only limited action — forward Jamari Sibley, who had been Georgetown's only four-star recruit for 2020–2021, and guard T.J. Berger — had transferred in search of greater playing time, Sibley leaving for UTEP and Berger departing for San Diego. However, Georgetown's loss of three players to transfer was merely the average among Division I schools during the 2021 offseason, which had seen 1,068 men's basketball players change schools at the dawn of the new transfer era. Three-year recruited walk-on Jaden Robinson, who had not appeared in a game during the 2020–2021 season, also left the program, opting not to return for a fourth year with the team.

Only six scholarship players returned from the 2020–2021 team. They included senior guard Donald Carey, Georgetown's top three-point shooter in 2020–2021; sophomore starting point guard Dante Harris, the 2021 Big East tournament Most Outstanding Player; junior centers Timothy Ighoefe — the presumptive starter after Wahab's departure — and Malcolm Wilson; and sophomore forwards Kobe Clark and Collin Holloway. Two walk-ons, junior guard Chuma Azinge and sophomore forward Victor Muresan, the son of National Basketball Association great Gheorghe Muresan, also returned. Two transfers arrived at Georgetown, senior Tre King from Eastern Kentucky and graduate student Kaiden Rice from The Citadel; the program hoped that King, a projected starter, could fill a gap at power forward as well as pose a three-point shooting threat, while Rice also was a skilled three-point shooter with the potential to make the starting lineup. Also joining the team were five freshmen who made up what 247Sports.com ranked as the 16th-best recruiting class in the United States and third in the Big East. It included guard Aminu Mohammed (the first five-star recruit of Ewing's tenure as head coach), four-star center Ryan Mutombo (the son of Georgetown and NBA great Dikembe Mutombo), combo guard Tyler Beard (who a year earlier had opted to delay his enrollment at Georgetown to spend an additional year at Hargrave Military Academy), power forward Jalin Billingsley, and shooting guard Jordan Riley. Mohammed was voted the preseason Big East Freshman of the Year for 2021–2022, the first Georgetown player so honored in Ewing's tenure as head coach.

Confusion over Georgetown's 2021–2022 schedule arose early in the offseason. On April 15, 2021, media reports indicated that Georgetown would play in the Orlando Invitational at the ESPN Wide World of Sports Complex in Kissimmee, Florida, on November 25, 26 and 28. On April 23, however, media reports indicated that the Hoyas would replace TCU in the 2021 Wooden Legacy in Anaheim, California, on November 25–26. The situation finally was clarified on May 20, when Georgetown confirmed it would play in the Wooden Legacy, explaining that reports of its participation in the Orlando Invitational had been unofficial and that the school had never confirmed its participation.

When the matchups for the Gavitt Tipoff Games against Big Ten Conference opponents were announced on June 24, Georgetown was among the three Big East teams not selected to participate. It marked the first time since 2017 that the Hoyas did not play in the annual competition between the two conferences.

To increase attendance in the lower bowl of Capital One Arena — an oversized venue for most college basketball games — and overcome the television optics of many empty seats down close to the court, Georgetown introduced a new ticket strategy for 2021–2022. It made tickets for each of six lower-profile non-conference home games (against Dartmouth, American, Siena, Longwood, UMBC, and Howard) free for season-ticket holders, but required them to actively opt in to attending each of the games; if they did not opt in to a given game, Georgetown reallocated their tickets to others who wanted to attend. Georgetown also allowed season-ticket holders who did opt in to those games to request an additional four free tickets. In addition, the school redistributed seats to help fill the lower bowl for the games, allowing some season-ticket holders and their guests to sit closer to the court than they otherwise would have. Georgetown also made all tickets to the opening game against Dartmouth free to anyone who requested one, both to boost early-season attendance and celebrate the return of fans to home games after their absence during the 2020–2021 season due to the COVID-19 pandemic.

Georgetown released its 2020–2021 roster later than usual, leading to speculation that roster turmoil might already have struck the team. When the roster was released on October 15, Tre King was missing from it. The school released a statement that day explaining that King "did not meet the conduct expectations of the University. He is not enrolled in classes and will not be on the Men's Basketball team." King was dismissed from the university on October 16. He re-entered the transfer portal on October 22, and his transfer to Iowa State was announced on December 1.

In their annual preseason poll in October, the Big East's coaches picked the Hoyas to finish in 10th place in the 11-team conference, a slight improvement over their 11th-place selection a year earlier. The loss of Tre King was a blow, and the 2021–2022 squad was a young team, rebuilding from its offseason roster turnover and facing possible frontcourt weaknesses. Sports pundits did not have high hopes for Georgetown to return to the NCAA tournament in 2022 and expected the Hoyas to finish in the bottom half of the Big East. However, if the Hoyas made a successful non-conference showing and demonstrated an ability to stand up to powerhouse teams in the Big East, a National Invitation Tournament bid in 2022 seemed a reasonable possibility as the 2021–2022 season began.

During the 2020–2021 season, the Big East Conference had postponed and attempted to reschedule any conference game that a team could not play due to COVID-19 pandemic issues. In the fall of 2021, the Big East Conference announced a new policy for the 2021–2022 season requiring any team which could not play a conference game on its originally scheduled date due to an insufficient number of available players, including as a result of COVID-19 exposure or infections, to forfeit the game, with a loss assigned to that team and a win assigned to its scheduled opponent, the win and loss also applying to the conference standings. The policy was intended to incentivize all Big East teams to be fully vaccinated against COVID-19 so as to avoid forfeiting games.

=== Non-conference season ===
With all tickets free to anyone who requested one, the Hoyas drew 8,641 fans — including former Georgetown and NBA great Dikembe Mutombo, who saw his son Ryan make his collegiate debut — to their opener against Dartmouth on November 13, the first game of a three-game homestand at Capital One Arena. Kobe Clark, Collin Holloway, and Timothy Ighoefe all sat out the game with injuries — Ighoefe due to a possible concussion he had suffered in practice — and center Malcolm Wilson made the first start of his college career and only his 13th appearance in a college game. Dartmouth guard Brendan Barry had a connection to Georgetown — his grandfather Jim Barry had been a standout forward on the Hoya teams of 1962–1963, 1964–1965, and 1965–1966 — but it was only the third meeting of the teams, the first since December 1974, and the first in Washington. Dartmouth had not had a winning season since 1998–1999 or an NCAA Tournament bid since 1959, had not fielded a team during the 2020–2021 season due to the COVID-19 pandemic, was expected to finish near the bottom of the Ivy League in 2021–2022, and had lost its season opener by 16 points to a Boston College team expected to finish near the bottom of the Atlantic Coast Conference, and Georgetown was a 16 1/2-point favorite. However, Dartmouth found great success in penetrating the Hoya defense and then passing the ball out for open three-point shots, and made 16 of 38 three-pointers (42 percent) during the game. The Big Green went on an 18–2 run in the first half to take a 28–10 lead, and although the Hoyas scored seven straight points late in the first half, the Big Green led 37–21 at halftime. The Hoyas started the second half with a 14–0 run to close to 37–35, but Dartmouth then went on an 11–5 run of its own to pull out to a 48–40 lead. The Hoyas mounted another comeback, scoring the next 10 points, and took their only lead of the game at 50–48 with 10:56 left to play, but they held it for only 16 seconds as Dartmouth responded with a decisive 18–3 run and won 69–60 in a shocking upset. Georgetown's all-time record against Dartmouth fell to 1–2. Aminu Mohammed led the Hoyas with 17 points and Donald Carey scored 14.

Three days later, Georgetown had a much better game against American — a team which had played only 10 games in 2020–2021 due to the COVID-19 pandemic — and broke open a four-point game in the second half with a 24–2 run on the way to a 79–57 victory, the Hoyas' 11th straight win over the Eagles. Aminu Mohammed had a double-double with 14 points and 10 rebounds, Dante Harris scored 13, Donald Carey added 12, and Timothy Ighoefe returned to action, scoring six points and grabbing 11 rebounds. The Hoyas improved their record to 2–1 on November 19 with an 18-point victory over winless Siena — a team which entering the game ranked 339th in Division I in scoring offense and tied for 320th in scoring defense — in which Kaiden Rice snapped out of his season-opening slump, shooting 7-for-10 from three-point range and scoring 23 points, while Carey added 20, Harris scored 14, and Mohammed finished with 11.

Georgetown had planned to play in the 2020 Wooden Legacy tournament the previous season, but it was cancelled due to the COVID-19 pandemic. Instead, the Hoyas played in the 2021 edition of the Wooden Legacy, going on the road for the first time in the 2021–2022 season to play in the tournament at Anaheim Arena in Anaheim, California. An eight-team tournament from 2013 through 2019, the Wooden Legacy debuted a new four-team format in 2021, and Georgetown faced San Diego State in the semifinals on Thanksgiving night. The Hoyas had met the Aztecs only once before, in December 1981. Entering the game, the Aztecs were ranked only 342nd in Division I in three-point shooting at 24.6 percent while Georgetown was ranked 21st, making 41.5 percent of its three-pointers. During the game, however, San Diego State shot 7-of-16 from beyond the arc (43.8 percent) while Georgetown made only four out of 20 (20 percent) three-point shots. The Aztecs dunked five times on the Hoyas and built a 54–39 lead before the Hoyas closed to four points behind at 57–53 with 9 1/2 minutes left to play, but from there San Diego State outscored Georgetown 16–3 and won 73–56. Missing their last 10 shots, the Hoyas shot only 35.1 percent for the game and had only six assists. Aminu Mohammed and Dante Harris between them scored Georgetown's first 19 points and were the only Hoyas to finish in double figures, Mohammed with 20 points and Harris with 19. Donald Carey, Georgetown's leading scorer entering the game at 15.3 points per game, managed only four points, all on free throws, while Kaiden Rice shot 2-for-7 (28.5 percent) from three-point range and finished with eight points. It was the Aztecs' sixth straight win against the Big East, the longest active streak in the United States, and it evened the all-time record between the schools at 1–1.

The next day, San Diego State met USC in the tournament championship, while Georgetown was a 7 1/2-point favorite against Saint Joseph's, a 2–3 team, in the third-place game. Although the Hoyas and Hawks had played annually from the 1961–1962 through 1979–1980 seasons, it was the first meeting of the teams since then. Saint Joseph's led 15–14 with 11 minutes left in the first half, but after the Hoyas scored to take a 16–15 lead, the Hawks went on a 12–0 run and pulled ahead 27–16. Although Georgetown switched to an aggressive and effective full-court press and cut the lead to eight, the Hoyas shot only 30 percent from the field in the first half and at halftime Saint Joseph's led 36–26. After halftime, a 7–0 Hoya run helped Georgetown close the gap, and the Hoyas eventually took a 54–53 lead. Saint Joseph's responded with a 7–0 run of its own, and Georgetown again came back to close to 66–64. In the final seconds, Donald Carey lost the ball on a bad pass attempt with the Hawks leading 74–72, and Collin Holloway's last-second three-point attempt was blocked from behind, giving Saint Joseph's a 77–74 win. Saint Joseph's senior forward Taylor Funk had an outstanding performance, scoring a game-high 29 points on 9-for-11 (82 percent) shooting, including 8-for-10 from three-point range, and grabbing seven rebounds. Kaiden Rice led the Hoyas with 25 points, while Dante Harris scored 17, Donald Carey finished with 12, and Timothy Ighoefe grabbed 14 rebounds and added four points. The Hawks' victory tied the all-time series between the schools at 17–17 and dropped the Hoyas to 2–3 on the season. They returned to Washington ranked 230th in Division I in perimeter defense, allowing opponents to shoot 34.3 percent from three-point range.

Georgetown next met Longwood before a sparse crowd at Capital One Arena. Longwood had never beaten a major-conference team but scored the first nine points of the game on three three-pointers and shot 40 percent from beyond the arc during the first half. The Hoyas did not take their first lead until pulling ahead 28–27 with 3:56 left in the first half, then pulled away with a 12–4 run to end the half. Although Georgetown led for the rest of the game, the Lancers, who shot 37.5 percent from three-point range for the game, twice cut the deficit to one point. Georgetown still led by only three points with under three minutes to play, but then pulled ahead 81–75, and Longwood never got closer than four points the rest of the way. The Hoyas evened their record at 3–3 with a 91–83 victory. Sophomore Collin Holloway, who scored a total of 15 points during his freshman year, came off the bench to lead the Hoyas with a career-high 23 points on 7-of-9 shooting from the field, while Aminu Mohammed had a double-double (15 points and 11 rebounds), Kaiden Rice finished with 15 points on five three-pointers, Dante Harris added 14 points, seven rebounds, and five assists, and Donald Carey scored 12 points. Timothy Ighoefe left the game in the first half with what turned out to be a broken hand; he did not return to the game and had surgery on December 2, and on December 3 Ewing announced that he would be out of action for four to six weeks.

Georgetown went back on the road to meet South Carolina on December 5 in the first year of a two-year home-and-home series against the Gamecocks. Tracy McGrady, who had played and coached with Ewing in the NBA, South Carolina and NBA great Alex English, and Dikembe Mutombo all attended the game. Both teams shot poorly from the field at first — the Hoyas missed their first nine shots and 20 of their first 23, while South Carolina went 6-for-22 to start the game — but the Gamecocks mounted a balanced offense and the Hoyas trailed for the entire game, shooting only 9-for-41 (22 percent) from the field in the first half, and falling behind 21–9. Georgetown used a 14–4 run to close to 25–23, but South Carolina finished the half with an 11–4 spurt of its own, and Georgetown went into the locker room at halftime behind 36–27. The Hoyas spent most of the second half trailing by about eight points, fell as many as 15 points behind, and never got closer than six points, and South Carolina used a late 13–4 run to clinch an 80–67 victory. Donald Carey — who connected on four of eight three-point attempts, the only Hoya to make more than one three-pointer — scored 20 points, Aminu Mohammed 17, and Dante Harris 13, but Kaiden Rice missed all ten shots he took during the game, eight of them from three-point range. Georgetown dropped below .500 for the season again and headed back to Washington to close out non-conference play with a four-game homestand at Capital One Arena.

The homestand began with a blowout win over UMBC in which Georgetown scored 100 points for the first time since December 2018 — and fourth time in Ewing's tenure as head coach — and improved its all-time record against the Retrievers to 5–0. Kaiden Rice bounced back from his ineffective outing against South Carolina three days earlier with an historic game, leading the Hoyas with a career-high 34 points — the first Hoya to score 30 or more points in a game since Mac McClung in December 2018 — on 11-for-14 shooting from the field, and his 10 three-pointers (on 12 attempts) — including four in less than five minutes in the second half — broke the previous school record of seven in a single game, set by Mark Tillmon in 1990 and matched several times since. With his father Dikembe again looking on, Ryan Mutombo had his first collegiate double-double with 15 points and 11 rebounds, both career highs, while Aminu Mohammed finished with the third double-double (13 points and 10 rebounds) of his collegiate career. Dante Harris added 13 points.

In front of its largest crowd of the season by far — including former Georgetown and NBA greats Dikembe Mutombo and Alonzo Mourning and former Syracuse standout and NBA player Rony Seikaly — Georgetown next faced Syracuse on December 11, the 97th meeting of the schools in a series that dated to 1930. It was the annual renewal of the archrivalry between the schools during their membership in the original Big East Conference of 1979–2013, when John Thompson coached Georgetown and Jim Boeheim coached Syracuse. Thompson had died in 2020, and before the first game of the 2020–21 season, Georgetown had named its home court "John Thompson Jr. Court" in his honor in a ceremony at McDonough Gymnasium, where Georgetown played all of its home games that season with no fans in the stands because of the ongoing COVID-19 pandemic. The school planned to dedicate the home court's name at Capital One Arena in front of fans when public health restrictions allowed a resumption of games there and with fans in attendance. Play resumed at Capital One Arena and fans returned to games at the beginning of the 2021–2022 season, but — although the name "John Thompson Jr. Court" appeared on the court at Capital One Arena from the first game of the season — Georgetown waited until a ceremony before the Syracuse game to dedicate the court, with Boeheim — in his 46th season as Syracuse's head coach — looking on with a smile.

Georgetown took the lead five minutes into the game on three straight Kaiden Rice three-pointers, but Syracuse responded with a 9–0 run and the Orange retook the lead in the middle of the first half. Georgetown had trouble scoring against Syracuse's strong zone defense in the first half, shooting only 37 percent from the field to Syracuse's 56 percent, and at halftime trailed 44–34. Ewing went with a smaller, quicker lineup during the second half to overcome the Orange's zone defense, using a rotation of guards and forwards rather than relying on a post player handling the ball in the middle of the zone, resulting in the Hoyas shooting 56 percent from the field after halftime. Georgetown opened the second half with a 21–9 run, giving the Hoyas their first lead since the middle of the first half at 55–53 with 11 1/2 minutes remaining in the game. All five Syracuse starters averaged in double figures on the season and scored in double figures during the game, but Georgetown's defense clamped down in the second half. Although the Orange's third-leading scorer and top three-point shooter, junior guard Joseph Girard III, went 4-for-6 from the field in the first half, he did not score again until 10 seconds remained in the game thanks to Dante Harris's defense — and to that of Tyler Beard, who filled in for Harris when Harris departed the game for four minutes in the second half after hurting his ankle in a hard fall. During the second half, Syracuse shot only 36.1 percent from the field and 3-for-14 (21.4 percent) from three-point range. The Hoyas made their last six free throws, and Georgetown took the lead for good at 75–73 with 1:11 left to play on a Kaiden Rice three-pointer — his first three-pointer after seven straight misses. Georgetown committed 11 turnovers, seven of them in the second half, and Syracuse outscored the Hoyas 42–26 in the paint, but Georgetown attempted 10 more free throws than the Orange and outrebounded Syracuse 38–31, and Georgetown won 79–75. Aminu Mohammed shot 7-for-14 from the field and sank eight out of nine free throws, scored 20 points in the second half, and finished with a double-double (a game-high and career-high 23 points and a game-high and career-high 13 rebounds) along with two blocked shots, two steals, and a personal-best five assists; his two free throws with nine seconds left clinched the win. Donald Carey added 18 points on 4-for-7 shooting from beyond the arc and 6-for-6 from the free-throw line, while Kaiden Rice made five of his 15 three-point attempts to finish with 15 points. Off the bench, Collin Holloway scored 10 points, eight of them in the second half.

With Timothy Ighoefe still out of action, Jordan Riley out indefinitely with a shoulder injury suffered during the UMBC game that required surgery, and Jalin Billingsley and second-leading scorer Kaiden Rice (at 14.5 points per game on 43.3 percent three-point shooting) sidelined by a non-COVID-19-related illness, the Hoyas — with only seven scholarship players available — were shorthanded four days later when they hosted a Howard team that was much improved from its previous two seasons. Bison fifth-year senior guard Kyle Foster scored a career-high 26 points during the game and Howard led 31–22 in the first half before the Hoyas took the lead for good with a 24–6 run before halftime. Both Aminu Mohammed and Collin Holloway fouled out in the game's final minutes, leaving Georgetown with only five scholarship players available, so walk-on Chuma Azinge stepped in and logged a career-high nine minutes. Howard got as close as 56–52 in the second half, but an 18–4 Hoya run followed that sealed the victory for Georgetown. Georgetown's defense forced a season-high 21 turnovers. It was the Hoyas' sixth straight home victory, and it improved Georgetown's all-time record against the Bison to 11–0 in a series that dated back to 1999. Tyler Beard, who had scored a total of 14 points in the previous nine games of his collegiate career, came off the bench for a career-high 23 points. Holloway scored 15 in his first collegiate start and Malcolm Wilson finished with a 13 points and eight rebounds — both career highs — and blocked four shots. Two other Hoyas also scored in double figures, with Donald Carey adding 14 points and Dante Harris 10. The victory gave Georgetown a 49–0 record all-time against the eight programs that made up the Mid-Eastern Athletic Conference at the time and it extended the Hoyas' winning streak to three, the longest regular-season winning streak for Georgetown since December 2019. However, it also was Georgetown's last victory of the season.

What turned out to be a school-record losing streak began when Georgetown finished its non-conference schedule by hosting TCU on December 18 in the final game of the annual Big East–Big 12 Battle. It was the first meeting of the schools, and the first game TCU ever played in Washington, D.C. Jalin Billingsley and Kaiden Rice returned to action, but Dante Harris was sidelined, having sprained his ankle in the Syracuse game and aggravated the injury during practice on December 17, leaving Tyler Beard to fill in for him at point guard. TCU jumped out to an early 10–4 lead, but Georgetown closed the gap and took the lead at 13–12 with 11 minutes left in the first half. TCU later jumped out to a 30–23 lead — the largest lead either team had in the first half — before the Hoyas scored nine straight points to pull ahead 32–30, and from there the two teams were unable to achieve much separation from one another; although TCU led for 26 minutes overall during the game — never by double digits — and Georgetown trailed 39–36 at halftime, there were 13 ties and 16 lead changes during the game. The second half was back-and-forth and Georgetown led 61–59 midway through the half, but then TCU went on a decisive 14–3 run that ended with 4:14 left to play put the Horned Frogs ahead 73–64, their largest lead of the game; although the Hoyas closed to 76–73, TCU scored the final four points to win 80–73, the Horned Frogs′ sixth straight victory. Aminu Mohammed had a double-double (game highs of 21 points and 11 rebounds), Kaiden Rice went 4-for-11 in three-pointers and scored 14 points, and Donald Carey added 12. Georgetown's persistent weakness over several years in three-point defense — the Hoyas were ranked 10th in the 11-team Big East in defending against three-pointers — was on display, allowing the Horned Frogs to sink a season-high 11 three-pointers; shooting 27.9 percent from beyond the arc entering the game, TCU sank 42 percent of its three-point shots against the Hoyas. Georgetown wrapped up the non-conference portion of its schedule with a record of 6–5.

=== Conference season ===
==== COVID-19 pause ====
The previous season, with Connecticut joining the Big East, plans had called for Georgetown to play its first-ever 20-game Big East Conference schedule, with a home-and-home series against each of the other ten Big East teams, but cancellations due to the COVID-19 pandemic had reduced the Hoyas' conference schedule to 16 games. Plans again called for a 20-game conference schedule in 2021–2022, but COVID-19 again interfered. Under the new Big East Conference policy for the season, any team unable to field enough players for a game, including for COVID-19 reasons, was required to forfeit the game, and when COVID-19 problems arose on the Georgetown team after the conclusion of the non-conference schedule, the Hoyas were forced to forfeit their December 22 conference season opener at No. 22 Providence. The forfeit temporarily dropped Georgetown's overall record to 6–6 and conference record to 0–1.

On December 23, however, after four Big East games had been cancelled due to COVID-19 and with cases of the disease spiking across the United States, the Big East rescinded the policy requiring forfeits. It announced a new policy, under which a team would be required to play a scheduled game if it could field seven scholarship players and one "countable" coaching staff member for the game, but that no team would be required to forfeit a game it could not play for COVID-19 reasons. Instead, any such game would be rescheduled if possible or declared a "no contest" if rescheduling proved impossible. The new policy erased Georgetown's forfeit to Providence and returned the team's record to 6–5 overall and 0–0 in the Big East. It also came just in time for the Hoyas to avoid forfeiting a second game, because on December 24 Georgetown announced that its game against Creighton scheduled for December 28 also was cancelled because of COVID-19 issues on the team. With continuing COVID-19 problems on both the Georgetown and St. John's teams, the Big East announced on December 27 that Georgetown's first two conference home games, against St. John's on January 1 and No. 22 Xavier on January 4, also were cancelled. On January 1, Georgetown announced that its game at Providence had been rescheduled for January 20, and that the postponed game at Creighton would be played on February 14. On January 4, the Big East announced that the game against St. John's had been moved from Capital One Arena to McDonough Gymnasium and rescheduled for February 21, then on January 5 announced that the rescheduled game had been moved to February 3. The Xavier game never was rescheduled, limiting the Hoyas to a 19-game conference season. Meanwhile, the Hoyas paused basketball activities until January 4, when they resumed practices.

==== January ====
The Hoyas finally opened their conference season — the last Big East team to do so — by hosting Marquette at Capital One Arena on January 7. Donald Carey sat out the game with an undisclosed illness, so Collin Holloway started in his place, Holloway's second collegiate start Kobe Clark returned to action for the first time since a hamstring injury sidelined him on November 25, but Ryan Mutombo did not play. Georgetown's defense was unable to stop the Golden Eagles either in the paint or from the perimeter, and Marquette shot 60 percent from the field. Marquette took advantage of Georgetown's 15 turnovers to score 29 points in transition, outshot the Hoyas 56–28 in the paint, and shot 34.6 percent from three-point range. The Hoyas trailed by only a point in the first half when the Golden Eagles began a surge of just under five minutes in which they pulled ahead by 18 points, and although Georgetown clawed back to a three-point deficit in the second half, another huge Marquette run put the Golden Eagles ahead by 32 points. Collin Holloway led the team with 17 points, Dante Harris added 15, and Aminu Mohammed finished with 12, but the Hoyas shot only 4-of-18 from three-point range and only 30 percent from the field overall, and Marquette won 92–64, a season-high score for a Georgetown opponent. A furious Patrick Ewing abruptly left a postgame press conference after telling reporters that he was disappointed in the team's performance, saying "We did not compete", adding that "Big John [former Georgetown head coach John Thompson, Jr.] is rolling over in his grave for the performance that we showed tonight" and concluding with "everybody is on notice. If they want to play, they're going to have to frigging play."

During a six-day layoff before the Hoyas hosted Butler, Georgetown announced on January 12 that Ewing would sit out the game against the Bulldogs at Capital One Arena on January 13 in accordance with District of Columbia public health guidelines, and that assistant coach Louis Orr would guide the team that night. Timothy Ighoefe returned to action for the Butler game, playing for the first time since breaking his hand against Longwood on November 30, but Donald Cary, Dante Harris, and Kobe Clark all missed the game due to illness, and Georgetown's only remaining point guard, Tyler Beard, started in place of Harris. Missing an average 17 points per game from their sidelined players, the shorthanded Hoyas fell behind 14–10 to start the game, then used a 10–3 run to take a 20–17 lead halfway through the first half. An 11–2 Butler run to close the first half allowed the Bulldogs to tie the game at 27–27 with 2:55 left in the half and take a 32–27 halftime lead, and Butler scored the first eight points of the second half, capping off a 13–0 run to pull ahead 40–27. Butler later increased its lead to 53–33, and although Georgetown closed to a 10-point deficit with 1:43 remaining, the Hoyas got no closer, and the Bulldogs cruised to a 72–58 victory. Beard led the team with 15 points, Collin Holloway finished with 11, and Ighoefe scored four points and grabbed nine rebounds in 16 minutes of play, but the Hoyas shot only 38.5 percent from the field in the first half and 30.3 percent after halftime and showed weaknesses in turnovers, in scoring on layups, and especially on defense. Aminu Mohammed finished with only seven points on 2–for 16 shooting, while Kaiden Rice hit only one three-pointer on eight attempts and scored only five points. Georgetown dropped to 0–2 in conference play and at 6–7 became the only Big East Team with an overall losing record. Three days later, with Dante Harris returning to action and scoring 13 points but Donald Carey, Kobe Clark, and Ewing still sidelined and Orr again coaching the team, the Hoyas' losing streak grew to four games in a loss to St. John's at Madison Square Garden. Aminu Mohammed had a double-double (13 points and 12 rebounds) despite attempting only seven field goals, and Kaiden Rice scored 19 points, but the Hoyas committed 21 turnovers, off which the Red Storm scored 29 points. Georgetown's defense remained porous, allowing St. John's to break open a 15–15 tie with an 11–0 run in the first half. The Hoyas closed to a six-point deficit, but trailed by 11 at halftime and fell behind by 20 points in the second half. Although the Hoyas used a 15–3 run to close the gap to eight points, they never got closer than seven points after halftime. Georgetown opened its conference season with three straight losses for the first time since the 2016–17 season with two straight games against ranked teams looming next on their schedule.

The Hoyas next visited No. 21 Providence — their first Top-25 opponent of the season — in a game rescheduled from December 22. It was Providence's first game in 12 days due to COVID-19-related cancellations. The Hoyas started slow, missing their first 11 shots and committing five turnovers in the first seven minutes, and the Friars opened a 13–0 lead before Georgetown scored. Georgetown used an 18–2 run to close the gap and trailed by only three points, 37–34, at halftime. Providence opened the second half with an 11–2 run to take a 12-point lead, and Georgetown fell behind by 16 points halfway through the second half before closing to a 64–60 deficit with five minutes remaining. The Hoyas got no closer, and the Friars held on to win 83–75, giving Georgetown its first 0–4 conference start since 2016–2017. Returning from a week-and-a-half of inactivity due to COVID-19 protocols, Donald Carey scored 21 points and Kaiden Rice added 19 off the bench while Aminu Mohammed finished with 12. Entering the game with a Big East-worst 26.7 percent team three-point shooting average, the Hoyas went 13-for-23 (56.5 percent) from beyond the arc. However, their defense — worst in the conference, giving up 79.1 points per game entering the game — had another bad showing: The Friars had little trouble against Georgetown's man-to-man defense, and Providence scored 30 points in the paint, shooting 51.7 percent overall from the field and 50 percent (5 for 10) from three-point range.

Georgetown returned home to meet another ranked opponent, No. 11 Villanova. The Wildcats pulled out to a nine-point lead before Georgetown used a full-court press to force several Villanova turnovers. Team captain Donald Carey scored the 1,000th point of his collegiate career with 2:47 remaining in the first half, and the Hoyas led 40–37 at halftime and extended their lead to 47–39 with 16:47 left to play in the game, but the Wildcats then scored nine straight points to take the lead. Georgetown led for the last time at 56–55 with 10:43 remaining. Villanova pulled away after that and won 85–74. The Wildcats shot 53.6 percent from the field and went 16-for-16 from the free-throw line, and Villanova guard Collin Gillespie scored a game-high 28 points, only two points short of his career high, set against Georgetown on February 3, 2019. It was Villanova's fifth win over Georgetown in six meetings and 17th in the last 20 games between the schools. The result evened the all-time series between the schools at 48–48, the first all-time series tie since it was 7–7 in 1981 and a marked turnaround since Georgetown held a 42–28 series edge — the greatest series lead by either school — in 2012. Villanova head coach Jay Wright improved his all-time record against Georgetown to 23–13, while Ewing's coaching record against Villanova fell to 2–8 and all-time record as Georgetown's head coach to 68–69. Collin Holloway led the Hoyas with a career-high 25 points, Dante Harris added 17, and Aminu Mohammed finished with 13 and Carey with 11. Georgetown opened its Big East season with five straight losses for the first time in school history, with four of the conference losses by double-digit margins. In The Washington Post that evening, columnist Candace Bucker wrote that the 2022–2023 Hoyas had made "the worst kind of program history," that the program's circumstances had "never been this dire," and that for the first time in many observers' memory, the Washington, D.C., area was witnessing "an irrelevant Georgetown hoops program." creating "a hole in the region's fabric of basketball."

Three days later, with ESPN questioning whether Ewing's head-coaching tenure could survive the 0–5 conference start, the Hoyas were on the road to play their third straight ranked opponent, visiting No. 20 Connecticut. UConn never trailed in the game, even though Georgetown hit seven of its first 10 three-pointers and went 8-first-12 from beyond the arc in the first half, closing to 36–31. However, the Huskies shot 56 from the field during the half, held a 52–40 lead at halftime, and then opened the second half with a 5–0 run to lead 57–40. Connecticut's lead reached 20 points at 72–52, and the Huskies extended their lead from there, winning in a rout, 96–73. It was UConn's second-largest margin of victory against the Hoyas, exceeded only by a 94–70 win over Georgetown in January 2004. The Huskies outscored the Hoyas on fast breaks 27–6 and outrebounded Georgetown 40–28. Aminu Mohammed led the Hoyas with 15 points, Collin Holloway had 11, and Donald Carey finished with 10. Jalin Billingsley left the game late in the first half with a knee injury and did not return. A loss in a rematch with Butler in Indianapolis four days later closed out Georgetown's first winless January since 1910. In a losing effort against the Bulldogs, Aminu Mohammed scored a game-high 16 points and Donald Carey added 12. After the game, KenPom ranked Georgetown's defense the worst in Big East history since KenPom's ratings began in 2002.

On January 27, Georgetown announced that junior guard/wing Wayne Bristol Jr., had transferred from Howard to Georgetown amid hopes that he was eligible to begin play with Georgetown without delay, although "administrative issues" with the NCAA about his eligibility cropped up almost immediately. Although his eligibility for the spring semester eventually was resolved, e did not appear in a game during the 2021–2022 season.

==== February–March ====
Georgetown opened February with a three-game homestand, which began with losses to Seton Hall and St. John's, the latter game rescheduled from January 1. To kick off Black History Month, Georgetown wore the colors of the Washington Bears and Seton Hall the colors of the Owl Field Club of Newark, New Jersey, a tribute to pre-National Basketball Association professional African American basketball teams. With Capital One Arena booked for a Kacey Musgraves concert, the St. John's game took place at McDonough Gymnasium with a crowd limited to 1,100 Georgetown student season-ticket holders due to COVID-19 pandemic-related restructions, Georgetown's first Big East game at McDonough with fans in attendance since 1984. Donald Carey led the Hoyas in both games, with 15 points against Seton Hall and a career-high 23 against St. John's, while Aminu Mohammed had 14 points against the Pirates, Kaiden Rice came off the bench in both games and finished with 12 against Seton Hall and 20 in the St. John's game, and Dante Harris scored 12 against Seton Hall and just missed a double-double against St. John's with 10 points and nine rebounds.

The Hoyas finished the homestand by hosting Providence, which had risen to No. 15 in the AP poll and entered the game on a six-game winning streak. It was the 1,500th broadcast — well over half the 2,803 Georgetown games ever played — for longtime Georgetown radio voice Rich Chvotkin, who had broadcast every Georgetown game since the 1974–1975 season except for missing most of the 1990–1991 season while on United States Army Reserve duty during the Gulf War. The Hoyas forced Providence — which entered the game averaging 11.8 turnovers per game — into 10 turnovers in the first half and led at halftime 30–27 despite committing nine turnovers of their own. It was only the second halftime lead of the season against a Big East opponent for Georgetown, but the tide turned after halftime. Georgetown scored only two field goals in the first 12:26 of the second half, allowing Providence to take the lead and pull away. Friars junior guard Jared Bynum scored only five points in the first half, but in the second half had a personal 13–0 run and outscored the entire Georgetown team 27–22 to finish with a career-high 32 points. Aminu Mohammed led the Hoyas with 18 points, and Donald Carey scored 11, but the Friars won 71–52 in Providence's 12th victory in 15 games against Georgetown since 2015, completing the Friars′ sixth regular-season sweep of the Hoyas in eight seasons. The loss also extended the Hoyas′ losing streak to a school-record 11 games, exceeding the 10-game skid that extended across the last nine games of the 2003–2004 season and the opening game of the 2004–2005 season. At 6–15, the Hoyas also fell to nine games below .500 for the first time since the 1971–1972 season, when they had posted a 3–23 record.

The losing streak reached 12 games in a visit to DePaul in which Blue Demons sophomore forward David Jones had the first triple double in DePaul history (22 points, 14 rebounds, 10 assists). The Hoyas led 31–30 at halftime, but the Blue Demons broke a second-half tie to put the game away with a 26–0 run as part of stretch in which they outscored the Hoyas 33–2. A scheduling anomaly followed in which Georgetown played back-to-back games against Creighton, caused by the rescheduling of the December 28 game at Creighton to February 14. In the first game, at Capital One Arena on February 12, two Bluejays — Ryan Hawkins with a season-high 30 points and 12 rebounds and Ryan Kalkenbrenner with a career-high 22 points and 15 rebounds — had double-doubles and Creighton had a season-high 26 assists on the way to defeating the Hoyas, and in the rematch two days later in Omaha, the Hoyas gave up a career-high 27 points to Bluejays guard Alex O'Connell and another double-double to Hawkins (14 points and 10 rebounds). Kaiden Rice led the Hoyas with 24 points against DePaul and scored 16 points in the first Creighton game. Aminu Mohammed had a double-double (16 points and 10 rebounds) against DePaul, 11 points in the first Creighton game, and another double-double in the second Creighton game with a season-high 27 points and 10 rebounds. Donald Carey had 12 points against the Blue Demons, 16 in the first game against the Bluejays, and 12 against Creighton in the second game, while Dante Harris finished with 10 points in the first game against the Bluejays and had a career-high 23 points in the second Creighton game. The back-to-back losses to Creighton extended the Hoyas' school-record losing streak to 14 games, and it lengthened further when Georgetown lost at Marquette on February 16, with Collin Holloway leading the team with 15 points, Donald Carey and Dante Harris each adding 14, and Aminu Mohammed finishing with another double-double (13 points and 17 rebounds). The Marquette loss gave Georgetown a school-record 14 conference losses in a single season.

Georgetown next visited No. 10 Villanova, the winner of four in a row, in the 91st meeting of the teams. Georgetown fell behind 16–5 in the first 10 1/2 minutes, but the Hoyas took advantage of poor Villanova outside shooting to close to 19–18 with 4:14 left in the first half. Villanova then finished the half with a 13–4 run. The Hoyas held Villanova's two top scorers — guards Collin Gillespie and Justin Moore — to 13-of-15 (13.3 percent) shooting from the field in the opening half, but themselves shot only 8-for-29 (27.6 percent) from the field and 3-of-14 (21.4 percent) in three-pointers, and Georgetown trailed 32–22 at halftime. Georgetown scored on two three-pointers to open the second half, cutting the Wildcats' lead to four. As the half continued, the Hoyas twice closed to a three-point deficit, including an 11–3 run that made the score 56–53 with 8:22 left to play, but Villanova then had a 10–4 run to pull ahead 66–57 with 4:19 remaining. The Wildcats went on to win 74–66, giving them a 46–45 edge in the series all-time, Villanova's first series lead since 7–6 in 1976. Donald Carey scored 24 points and Dante Harris added 16. The loss dropped Patrick Ewing's record as head coach against Big East opponents to 26–59.

After five days off, Georgetown opened its final homestand of the year by hosting DePaul, which snapped a four-game losing streak and handed the Hoyas their 17th straight defeat by scoring on a layup and two free throws in the final 59 seconds for a 68–65 victory. Aminu Mohammed just missed a double-double with 17 points and nine rebounds, while Donald Carey scored 15 points and Jalin Billingsley 10 against the Blue Demons. Georgetown then closed out its home season on February 27 with its final Top-25 opponent of the year, No. 21 Connecticut, which had a four-game winning streak entering the game. The Huskies made 11 of 20 three-pointers against the Hoya defense, with seven different UConn players sinking at least one three-point shot. UConn led 41–26 at halftime, 66–46 with 11:27 remaining, and 81–59 with 2:53 left play. Georgetown made a late run, but Connecticut won 86–77. Dante Harris paced the Hoyas on offense with 23 points, while Aminu Mohammed had 16 and Donald Carey added 13. The loss concluded a winless February for the Hoyas, clinched a last-place conference finish for Georgetown for the first time in the combined history of the original Big East Conference of 1979–2013 and the new Big East Conference, and dropped Patrick Ewing's career head-coaching record to 68–81.

In the immediate aftermath of the loss to Connecticut, the press asked Ewing about whether his job as head coach was secure, given the team's lack of success during the season, and he replied "Of course I want to be back here...But in this position and this job, whatever happens will happen. I’m hoping that I’ll be back and doing something that I love at a place that I love and getting us back to being the king of the hill." On March 2, Georgetown University athletic director Lee Reed issued a public statement in support o Ewing, acknowledging the "disappointment of a difficult season," but continuing: "In this ever[-]evolving landscape of college athletics we are committed to Coach Ewing, and we are working with him to evaluate every aspect of the men’s basketball program and to make the necessary changes for him to put us back on the path to success for next year."

Georgetown closed out the regular season with two road games. In the first, held the evening of March 2 not long after Reed's statement that day, the Hoyas lost to Seton Hall, with Kaiden Rice leading the team with 17 points, Collin Holloway adding 16, Dante Harris finishing with 12, and Donald Carey scoring 11. Combining results in both the original Big East Conference of 1979–2013 and those of the Big East Conference formed in 2013, the loss tied the Big East record for losses in a season, matched only by 0–18 records posted by Miami in the 1993–1994 season and DePaul in the 2008–2009 season, during both of which Big East teams played 18-game conference schedules. In the season finale at Xavier three days later, the Musketeers broke a five-game losing streak to hand Georgetown its 20th loss overall and 19th conference loss in a row, setting a record for conference losses in a season by a Big East team. Dante Harris had 19 points, Collin Holloway added 17 points, and Aminu Mohammed finished with a double-double (15 points and 16 rebounds).

Georgetown became the first Big East team ever to post an 0–19 record in regular-season conference play and only the third to have a winless conference season. The loss to Xavier completed the first winless conference season in school history. It also was the first time Georgetown has finished in last place in Big East history, and Georgetown's only last-place finish in a conference other than in the 1934–1935 season, when the Hoyas finished last in the Eastern Intercollegiate Conference.

=== Big East tournament ===
Seeded 11th in the 2022 Big East tournament, Georgetown met the sixth seed, Seton Hall, in the first round at Madison Square Garden in New York City on March 9. After the Pirates scored the first four points of the game, the Hoyas took the lead with a 13–0 run to hold a 13–4 lead with 14:19 to play in the first half, Although Seton Hall clawed back, a 6–0 Hoya run gave Georgetown a 24–15 with 5:46 left in the half. The Hoyas led by as many as 10 points before Seton Hall whittled down the lead, and the Hoyas led 27–24 at halftime. In the second half, Georgetown led 37–33 with 15:04 left to play, 46–42 with 7:03 left, and 53–52 with 1:05 remaining in the game. The Hoyas did not score again, however, while Seton Hall scored five points in the final minute to win 57–53, bringing Georgetown's season to an end. Playing in their last game as Hoyas, Aminu Mohammed had a double-double with 12 points and 10 rebounds, Donald Carey and Collin Holloway each scored 11 points, and Timothy Ighoefe grabbed 13 rebounds and had a career-high four blocks. Georgetown finished the season with an overall record of 6–25. It was the greatest number of losses ever suffered by Georgetown in a single season, and the team's .194 winning percentage was the second-worst in school history, with only the .115 winning percentage of the 1971–1972 team ranking lower.

== Schedule and results ==
Date time, TV	Rank^{#}	Opponent^{#}	Result	Record	High points	High rebounds	High assists	Site (attendance) city, state
Non-conference regular season
November 13, 2021*; 2:00 p.m., FS2		Dartmouth	L 60–69	0–1	17 – Mohammed	6 – Carey	5 – Harris	Capital One Arena (8,641); Washington, D.C.
November 16, 2021*; 8:30 p.m., FS2		American	W 79–57	1–1	14 – Mohammed	11 – Ighoefe	6 – Carey	Capital One Arena (4,327); Washington, D.C.
November 19, 2021*; 6:30 p.m., FS2		Siena	W 83–65	2–1	23 – Rice	6 – Mohammed	4 – Carey/Harris	Capital One Arena (4,460); Washington, D.C.
November 25, 2021*; 11:30 p.m., ESPN2		vs. San Diego State; Wooden Legacy semifinal	L 56–73	2–2	20 – Mohammed	9 – Carey	3 – Carey/Harris	Anaheim Arena (1,402 (Note: Combined attendance for both games of the Wooden Legacy on November 25, 2021.)); Anaheim, CA
November 26, 2021*; 9:00 p.m., ESPNU		vs. Saint Joseph's; Wooden Legacy third-place game	L 74–77	2–3	25 – Rice	14 – Ighoefe	6 – Harris	Anaheim Arena (2,890 (Note: Combined attendance for both games of the Wooden Legacy on November 26, 2021.)); Anaheim, CA
November 30, 2021*; 7:00 p.m., FS2		Longwood	W 91–83	3–3	23 – Holloway	11 – Mohammed	5 – Carey/Harris	Capital One Arena (2,732); Washington, D.C.
December 5, 2021*; 2:00 p.m., SECN		at South Carolina	L 67–80	3–4	20 – Carey	8 – Mohammed	6 – Harris	Colonial Life Arena (9,207); Columbia, SC
December 8, 2021*; 8:30 p.m., FS1		UMBC	W 100–71	4–4	34 – Rice	11 – Mutombo	7 – Harris	Capital One Arena (3,021); Washington, D.C.
December 11, 2021*; 12:00 p.m., FOX		Syracuse; Rivalry	W 79–75	5–4	23 – Mohammed	13 – Mohammed	6 – Harris	Capital One Arena (13,598); Washington, D.C.
December 15, 2021*; 6:30 p.m., FS1		Howard	W 85–73	6–4	23 – Beard	8 – Carey	7 – Harris	Capital One Arena (4,154); Washington, D.C.
December 18, 2021*; 2:10 p.m., FS1		TCU; Big East–Big 12 Battle	L 73–80	6–5	21 – Mohammed	11 – Mohammed	5 – Beard/Carey	Capital One Arena (5,053); Washington, D.C.
Big East regular season
December 22, 2021; 6:30 p.m., FS1		at No. 22 Providence	Game postponed. (COVID-19 pandemic). Rescheduled for January 20					Dunkin' Donuts Center (-); Providence, RI
December 28, 2021; 9:00 p.m., FS1		at Creighton	Game postponed. (COVID-19 pandemic). Rescheduled for February 14					CHI Health Center Omaha (-); Omaha, NE
January 1, 2022; 12:00 p.m., CBSSN		St. John's; Rivalry	Game postponed. (COVID-19 pandemic). Rescheduled for February 3.					Capital One Arena (-); Washington, D.C.
January 4, 2022; 7:00 p.m., FS1		No. 22 Xavier	Game cancelled (COVID-19 pandemic), Because no make-up game was scheduled.					Capital One Arena (-); Washington, D.C.
January 7, 2022; 6:30 p.m., FS1		Marquette	L 64–92	6–6 (0–1)	17 – Holloway	6 – Mohammed/Rice	3 – Harris/Holloway	Capital One Arena (4,860); Washington, D.C.
January 13, 2022; 7:00 p.m., FS1		Butler	L 58–72	6–7 (0–2)	15 – Beard	9 – Ighoefe	5 – Beard	Capital One Arena (4,117); Washington, D.C.
January 16, 2022; 4:35 p.m., FOX		at St. John's; Rivalry	L 69–88	6–8 (0–3)	19 – Rice	12 – Mohammed	4 – Harris	Madison Square Garden (5,161); New York, NY
January 20, 2022; 5:00 p.m., FS1		at No. 21 Providence; Rescheduled from December 22	L 75–83	6–9 (0–4)	21 – Carey	7 – Carey/Ighoefe	4 – Harris	Dunkin' Donuts Center (9,105); Providence, RI
January 22, 2022; 12:05 p.m., FOX		No. 11 Villanova	L 74–85	6–10 (0–5)	25 – Holloway	6 – Harris	7 – Carey	Capital One Arena (11,872); Washington, D.C.
January 25, 2022; 8:40 p.m., CBSSN		at No. 20 UConn; Rivalry	L 73–96	6–11 (0–6)	15 – Mohammed	7 – Mohammed	3 – Beard/Mohammed	Harry A. Gampel Pavilion (7,429); Storrs, CT
January 29, 2022; 12:00 p.m., FS1		at Butler	L 53–56	6–12 (0–7)	16 – Mohammed	6 – Harris/Mohammed	5 – Harris	Hinkle Fieldhouse (8,156); Indianapolis, IN
February 1, 2022; 8:40 p.m., FS1		Seton Hall	L 63–70	6–13 (0–8)	15 – Carey	8 – Mohammed	5 – Harris	Capital One Arena (3,462); Washington, D.C.
February 3, 2022; 6:00 p.m., FS1		St. John's; Rivalry/Rescheduled from January 1	L 77–90	6–14 (0–9)	23 – Carey	9 – Harris	4 – Harris	McDonough Gymnasium (1,100); Washington, D.C.
February 6, 2022; 12:00 p.m., FS1		No. 15 Providence	L 52–71	6–15 (0–10)	18 – Mohammed	6 – Ighoefe	3 – Carey	Capital One Arena (5,575); Washington, D.C.
February 9, 2022; 9:00 p.m., FS1		at DePaul	L 74–82	6–16 (0–11)	24 – Rice	10 – Mohammed	8 – Harris	Wintrust Arena (2,767); Chicago, IL
February 12, 2022; 12:00 p.m., FS1		Creighton	L 66–80	6–17 (0–12)	16 – Carey/Rice	8 – Wilson	5 – Harris	Capital One Arena (5,813); Washington, D.C.
February 14, 2022; 9:00 p.m., FS1		at Creighton; Rescheduled from December 28	L 77–88	6–18 (0–13)	27 – Mohammed	10 – Mohammed	2 – Carey/Harris	CHI Health Center Omaha (16,178); Omaha, NE
February 16, 2022; 8:00 p.m., FS2		at Marquette	L 66–77	6–19 (0–14)	15 – Holloway	17 – Mohammed	5 – Carey/Harris	Fiserv Forum (12,721); Milwaukee, WI
February 19, 2022; 5:00 p.m., FOX		at No. 10 Villanova	L 66–74	6–20 (0–15)	24 – Carey	8 – Mohammed	4 – Carey/Harris	Finneran Pavilion (6,501); Villanova, PA
February 24, 2022; 8:05 p.m., CBSSN		DePaul	L 65–68	6–21 (0–16)	18 – Mohammed	9 – Mohammed	4 – Harris	Capital One Arena (4,028); Washington, D.C.
February 27, 2022; 12:00 p.m., CBS		No. 21 UConn; Rivalry	L 77–86	6–22 (0–17)	23 – Harris	6 – Ighoefe	2 – Clark	Capital One Arena (7,114); Washington, D.C.
March 2, 2022; 7:05 p.m., CBSSN		at Seton Hall	L 68–73	6–23 (0–18)	17 – Rice	9 – Ighoefe	6 – Harris	Prudential Center (9,635); Newark, NJ
March 5, 2022; 7:15 p.m., FS1		at Xavier	L 75–97	6–24 (0–19)	19 – Harris	8 – Mohammed	2 – Carey/Holloway/Mohammed	Cintas Center (10,224); Cincinnati, OH
Big East tournament
March 9, 2022; 10:10 p.m., FS1	(11)	vs. (6) Seton Hall; First round	L 53–57	6–25	12 – Mohammed	13 – Ighoefe	3 – Carey/Mohammed	Madison Square Garden (17,163); New York, NY
*Non-conference game. ^{#}Rankings from AP Poll. (#) Tournament seedings in parentheses. All times are in Eastern Time.

== Awards and honors ==
=== Big East Conference honors ===
Postseason honors
Honors	Player	Position	Date awarded	Ref.
Big East All-Freshman Team	Aminu Mohammed	F	March 6, 2022	
Big East Sportsmanship Award	Donald Carey	G	March 7, 2022	
