= 2021–22 Creighton Bluejays men's basketball team =

American college basketball season

2021–22 Creighton Bluejays men's basketball

NCAA tournament, second round
- Conference: Big East Conference
- Record: 23–12 (12–7 Big East)
- Head coach: Greg McDermott (12th season)
- Assistant coaches: Alan Huss (4th season); Jalen Courtney-Williams (1st season); Ryan Miller (1st season)
- Home arena: CHI Health Center Omaha

2021–22 Big East men's basketball standings
	Conf.				Overall
Team	W		L	PCT	W		L	PCT
No. 13 Providence	14	–	3	.824	27	–	6	.818
No. 6 Villanova †	16	–	4	.800	30	–	8	.789
No. 21 UConn	13	–	6	.684	23	–	10	.697
Creighton	12	–	7	.632	23	–	12	.657
Seton Hall	11	–	8	.579	21	–	11	.656
Marquette	11	–	8	.579	19	–	13	.594
Xavier	8	–	11	.421	23	–	13	.639
St. John's	8	–	11	.421	17	–	15	.531
Butler	6	–	14	.300	14	–	19	.424
DePaul	6	–	14	.300	15	–	16	.484
Georgetown	0	–	19	.000	6	–	25	.194
† 2022 Big East tournament winner Rankings from AP poll

The 2021–22 Creighton Bluejays men's basketball team represented Creighton University in the 2021–22 NCAA Division I men's basketball season. The Bluejays were coached by 12th-year head coach Greg McDermott and played their home games at the CHI Health Center Omaha in Omaha, Nebraska, as members of the Big East Conference. They finished the season 23–12, 12–7 in Big East play to finish in fourth place. As the No. 4 seed in the Big East tournament, they defeated Marquette and Providence, before losing to Villanova in the Championship. They received an at-large bid to the NCAA tournament as the No. 9 seed in the Midwest Region, where they defeated San Diego State in the first round before losing to Kansas in the second round.

== Previous season ==
The Bluejays finished the 2020–21 season 22–9, 14–6 to finish second in Big East play. They defeated Butler and UConn in the Big East tournament before losing to Georgetown in the championship game. They received an at-large bid to the NCAA tournament as the No. 5 seed in the West region. They defeated UC Santa Barbara and Ohio to advance to the Sweet Sixteen. This marked the first time Creighton had won consecutive games in the same tournament and the first time they had advanced to the Sweet Sixteen since 1974 when the tournament had 25 teams. There they lost to eventual National Runner-Up Gonzaga.

On March 4, 2021, head coach McDermott was suspended for using racially insensitive language to his team. On March 8, the school reinstated McDermott after only missing one game and allowing him to coach in the Big East and NCAA Tournaments.

Marcus Zegarowski and Damien Jefferson were named to the All Big East Conference first and second teams, respectively. Denzel Mahoney was named as an All-Big East Honorable Mention. Zegarowski also earned Honorable Mention All-America honors from the Associated Press.

== Offseason ==
=== Departures ===
Name	Number	Pos.	Height	Weight	Year	Hometown	Notes
Antwann Jones	0	G	6'6"	210	Sophomore	Orlando, FL	Transferred to Louisiana
Jett Canfield	10	G	5'10"	165	Sophomore	Topeka, KS	Transferred to Drury
Marcus Zegarowski	11	G	6'2"	180	Junior	Hamilton, MA	Declared for the 2021 NBA draft
Christian Bishop	13	F	6'7"	205	Junior	Charlotte, NC	Transferred to Texas
Nic Zeil	20	F	6'8"	210	Sophomore	Kansas City, MO	Transferred to Colorado Christian
Damien Jefferson	23	F	6'5"	220	Redshirt Senior	East Chicago, IN	Graduated; Declared for the 2021 NBA draft
Mitch Ballock	24	G	6'5"	205	Senior	Eudora, KS	Graduated; Declared for the 2021 NBA draft
Denzel Mahoney	34	G/F	6'5"	220	Redshirt Senior	Oviedo, FL	Graduated; Declared for the 2021 NBA draft
Jacob Epperson	41	C	6'11"	235	Junior	Melbourne, Australia	Graduated early; chose not to return to program

=== 2021 recruiting class ===
College recruiting information
Name	Hometown	School	Height	Weight	Commit date
Arthur Kaluma; PF	Boston, MA	Dream City Christian	6 ft 8 in (2.03 m)	205 lb (93 kg)	May 16, 2021
Arthur Kaluma; PF	Recruit ratings: Rivals: 247Sports: ESPN:				
Ryan Nembhard; PG	Aurora, ON	Montverde Academy	6 ft 1 in (1.85 m)	165 lb (75 kg)	Jun 6, 2020
Ryan Nembhard; PG	Recruit ratings: Rivals: 247Sports: ESPN:				
Mason Miller; PF	Germantown, TN	Houston	6 ft 9 in (2.06 m)	180 lb (82 kg)	Nov 23, 2020
Mason Miller; PF	Recruit ratings: Rivals: 247Sports: ESPN:				
John Christofilis; SG	Seattle, WA	O'Dea	6 ft 4 in (1.93 m)	170 lb (77 kg)	Sep 25, 2020
John Christofilis; SG	Recruit ratings: Rivals: 247Sports: ESPN:				
Trey Alexander; SG	Oklahoma City, OK	Heritage Hall	6 ft 4 in (1.93 m)	185 lb (84 kg)	Jun 2, 2021
Trey Alexander; SG	Recruit ratings: Rivals: 247Sports: ESPN:				
Overall recruit ranking: Rivals: 12
Note: In many cases, Scout, Rivals, 247Sports, On3, and ESPN may conflict in their listings of height and weight.; In these cases, the average was taken. ESPN grades are on a 100-point scale.; Sources: "2021 Team Ranking". Rivals.

=== Incoming transfers ===
Name	Number	Pos.	Height	Weight	Year	Hometown	Previous School
KeyShawn Feazell	1	F	6'9"	230	Graduate Student	New Hebron, MS	Transferred from McNeese State
Ryan Hawkins	44	F	6'7"	222	Graduate Student	Atlantic, IA	Transferred from Northwest Missouri State

== Roster ==
2021–22 Creighton Bluejays men's basketball team
Players
Coaches

Pos.	#	Name	Height	Weight	Year	Previous school	Hometown
F	1	KeyShawn Feazell	6 ft 9 in (2.06 m)	230 lb (104 kg)	GS	McNeese State	New Hebron, MS
G	2	Ryan Nembhard (injured)	6 ft 0 in (1.83 m)	167 lb (76 kg)	Fr	Montverde Academy	Aurora, ON
G	4	Shereef Mitchell	6 ft 0 in (1.83 m)	174 lb (79 kg)	Jr	Sunrise Christian Academy	Omaha, NE
G	5	Alex O'Connell	6 ft 6 in (1.98 m)	185 lb (84 kg)	GS	Milton HS; Duke	Roswell, GA
F	10	Zander Yates (W)	6 ft 7 in (2.01 m)	206 lb (93 kg)	Fr	Houston	Germantown, TN
C	11	Ryan Kalkbrenner	7 ft 1 in (2.16 m)	256 lb (116 kg)	So	Trinity Catholic HS	St. Louis, MO
F	13	Mason Miller	6 ft 8 in (2.03 m)	187 lb (85 kg)	Fr	Houston	Germantown, TN
G	14	Sami Osmani (W)	6 ft 4 in (1.93 m)	196 lb (89 kg)	So	Oak Lawn Community HS	Oak Lawn, IL
G	15	John Christofilis	6 ft 3 in (1.91 m)	196 lb (89 kg)	Fr	O'Dea	Seattle, WA
G	21	Rati Andronikashvili	6 ft 4 in (1.93 m)	186 lb (84 kg)	RS Fr	35 Sajaro Skoka	Tbilisi, Georgia
G	22	Devin Davis (W)	6 ft 0 in (1.83 m)	180 lb (82 kg)	So	George Westinghouse College Prep	Chicago, IL
G	23	Trey Alexander	6 ft 4 in (1.93 m)	185 lb (84 kg)	Fr	Heritage Hall	Oklahoma City, OK
F	24	Arthur Kaluma	6 ft 7 in (2.01 m)	220 lb (100 kg)	Fr	Dream City Christian	Glendale, AZ
F	44	Ryan Hawkins	6 ft 7 in (2.01 m)	222 lb (101 kg)	GS	Northwest Missouri State	Atlantic, IA
F	55	Modestas Kancleris	6 ft 9 in (2.06 m)	208 lb (94 kg)	RS Fr	Varpas Gimnazija	Kaunas, Lithuania

Head coach

- Greg McDermott (Northern Iowa)

Assistant coach(es)

- Alan Huss (Creighton)
- Jalen Courtney-Williams (Morehead State)
- Ryan Miller (Northern State)

Legend

- (C) Team captain
- (S) Suspended
- (I) Ineligible
- (W) Walk-on
- Injured
- Current redshirt

Roster

== Schedule and results ==
Date time, TV	Rank^{#}	Opponent^{#}	Result	Record	High points	High rebounds	High assists	Site (attendance) city, state
Exhibition
October 30, 2021*; 7:00 p.m., FloSports		Upper Iowa	W 76–61		15 – Hawkins	9 – Tied	8 – Nembhard	CHI Health Center Omaha (14,844); Omaha, NE
Non-conference regular season
November 9, 2021*; 7:00 p.m., FS1		Arkansas–Pine Bluff	W 90–77	1–0	20 – O'Connell	11 – Hawkins	10 – Nembhard	CHI Health Center Omaha (15,072); Omaha, NE
November 11, 2021*; 7:30 p.m., FS1		Kennesaw State	W 51–44	2–0	13 – O'Connell	10 – Hawkins	2 – 3 tied	CHI Health Center Omaha (16,092); Omaha, NE
November 16, 2021*; 6:00 p.m., FS1		at Nebraska; Rivalry/Gavitt Tipoff Games	W 77–69	3–0	22 – Nembhard	10 – Hawkins	5 – 2 Tied'	Pinnacle Bank Arena (15,939); Lincoln, NE
November 19, 2021*; 2:15 p.m., ESPN3		vs. Brown; U.S. Virgin Islands Paradise Jam Quarterfinal	W 78–57	4–0	19 – Kalkbrenner	5 – 3 Tied	4 – 2 Tied	Sports and Fitness Center (322); St. Thomas, USVI
November 21, 2021*; 4:45 p.m., ESPN3		vs. Colorado State; U.S. Virgin Islands Paradise Jam Semifinal	L 81–95	4–1	16 – Kaluma	7 – Feazell	5 – Nembhard	Sports and Fitness Center; St. Thomas, USVI
November 22, 2021*; 6:45 p.m., ESPN3		vs. Southern Illinois; U.S. Virgin Islands Paradise Jam 3rd place game	W 66–64	5–1	14 – Kalkbrenner	6 – Hawkins	5 – Nembhard	Sports and Fitness Center; St. Thomas, USVI
November 27, 2021*; 5:00 p.m., FS2		SIU Edwardsville	W 70–65	6–1	14 – Hawkins	7 – Hawkins	5 – Nembhard	CHI Health Center Omaha (16,417); Omaha, NE
November 30, 2021*; 8:00 p.m., FS2		North Dakota State	W 80–55	7–1	17 – Kalkbrenner	8 – Feazell	6 – Nembhard	CHI Health Center Omaha (15,428); Omaha, NE
December 4, 2021*; 8:00 p.m., FS1		No. 19 Iowa State; Big East–Big 12 Battle	L 58–64	7–2	25 – Hawkins	10 – Kalkbrenner	2 – 2 Tied	CHI Health Center Omaha (18,294); Omaha, NE
December 11, 2021*; 11:00 a.m., FS1		vs. No. 24 BYU	W 83–71	8–2	25 – Hawkins	9 – Kalkbrenner	3 – Andronikashvili	Sanford Pentagon (2,835); Sioux Falls, SD
December 14, 2021*; 7:00 p.m., FS1		Arizona State	L 57–58	8–3	16 – Kalkbrenner	10 – Hawkins	8 – Nembhard	CHI Health Center Omaha (15,011); Omaha, NE
Big East regular season
December 17, 2021; 7:00 p.m., FS1		No. 9 Villanova	W 79–59	9–3 (1–0)	19 – Hawkins	11 – Hawkins	4 – Nembhard	CHI Health Center Omaha (17,208); Omaha, NE
January 1, 2022; 11:00 a.m., FS1		at Marquette	W 75–69 ^{2OT}	10–3 (2–0)	20 – Kalkbrenner	12 – Tied	6 – Andronikashvili	Fiserv Forum (13,689); Milwaukee, WI
January 5, 2022; 7:30 p.m., FS1		at No. 19 Villanova	L 41–75	10–4 (2–1)	13 – O'Connell	6 – Feazell	3 – Hawkins	Finneran Pavilion (6,501); Villanova, PA
January 11, 2022; 8:00 p.m., FS1		No. 23 Providence	Canceled					CHI Health Center Omaha; Omaha, NE
January 15, 2022; 11:00 a.m., FOX		at No. 17 Xavier	L 73–80	10–5 (2–2)	22 – O'Connell	13 – Hawkins	6 – Nembhard	Cintas Center (10,224); Cincinnati, OH
January 19, 2022; 6:00 p.m., FS1		St. John's	W 87–64	11–5 (3–2)	28 – O'Connell	11 – Kalkbrenner	4 – Tied	CHI Health Center Omaha (16,840); Omaha, NE
January 22, 2022; 4:30 p.m., CBSSN		DePaul	W 60–47	12–5 (4–2)	18 – Kalkbrenner	10 – Kalkbrenner	5 – Nembhard	CHI Health Center Omaha (16,854); Omaha, NE
January 26, 2022; 6:30 p.m., FS2		at Butler	L 55–72	12–6 (4–3)	18 – Kaluma	7 – O'Connell	3 – Nembhard	Hinkle Fieldhouse (6,920); Indianapolis, IN
January 29, 2022; 1:00 p.m., FS1		No. 21 Xavier	L 64–74	12–7 (4–4)	23 – Nembhard	8 – Kalkbrenner	2 – 3 Tied	CHI Health Center Omaha (17,850); Omaha, NE
February 1, 2022; 5:30 p.m., FS1		at No. 17 UConn	W 59–55	13–7 (5–4)	23 – Hawkins	11 – Hawkins	3 – Alexander	XL Center (10,443); Hartford, CT
February 4, 2022; 6:00 p.m., FS1		at Seton Hall	L 55–74	13–8 (5–5)	12 – O'Connell	8 – Kaluma	5 – Nembhard	Prudential Center (9,062); Newark, NJ
February 8, 2022; 8:00 p.m., CBSSN		Butler	W 54–52	14–8 (6–5)	16 – Kaluma	10 – O'Connell	2 – Tied	CHI Health Center Omaha (15,375); Omaha, NE
February 12, 2022; 11:00 a.m., FS1		at Georgetown	W 80–66	15–8 (7–5)	30 – Hawkins	15 – Kalkbrenner	7 – Nembhard	Capital One Arena (5,813); Washington, DC
February 14, 2022; 8:00 p.m., FS1		Georgetown; Rescheduled from December 28	W 88–77	16–8 (8–5)	27 – O'Connell	12 – Hawkins	6 – Nembhard	CHI Health Center Omaha (16,178); Omaha, NE
February 17, 2022; 9:00 p.m., CBSSN		DePaul; Rescheduled from December 20	W 71–59	17–8 (9–5)	25 – Hawkins	13 – Kalkbrenner	6 – Nembhard	Wintrust Arena (2,561); Chicago, IL
February 20, 2022; 2:00 p.m., FS1		Marquette	W 83–82	18–8 (10–5)	21 – Kalkbrenner	9 – Hawkins	5 – Tied	CHI Health Center Omaha (18,192); Omaha, NE
February 23, 2022; 6:30 p.m., FS1		at St. Johns	W 81–78	19–8 (11–5)	25 – Hawkins	12 – Hawkins	7 – Nembhard	Carnesecca Arena (4,542); Queens, NY
February 26, 2022; 7:30 p.m., FS1		at No. 11 Providence	L 51–72	19–9 (11–6)	13 – Kalkbrenner	10 – Hawkins	2 – Alexander	Dunkin' Donuts Center (12,400); Providence, RI
March 2, 2022; 7:30 p.m., FS1		No. 18 UConn	W 64–62	20–9 (12–6)	22 – Kalkbrenner	10 – Kalkbrenner	4 – O'Connell	CHI Health Center Omaha (17,126); Omaha, NE
March 5, 2022; 1:30 p.m., FOX		Seton Hall	L 60–65	20–10 (12–7)	17 – Kalkbrenner	8 – Kalkbrenner	5 – O'Connell	CHI Health Center Omaha (17,221); Omaha, NE
Big East tournament
March 10, 2022; 1:30 p.m., FS1	(4)	vs. (5) Marquette; Quarterfinals	W 74–63	21–10	18 – Hawkins	9 – Kalkbrenner	8 – Alexander	Madison Square Garden (19,812); New York, NY
March 11, 2022; 5:30 p.m., FS1	(4)	vs. (1) No. 11 Providence; Semifinals	W 85–58	22–10	21 – Samuels	12 – Samuels	10 – Gillespie	Madison Square Garden (19,812); New York, NY
March 12, 2022; 6:30 p.m., FOX	(4)	vs. (2) No. 8 Villanova; Championship	L 48–54	22–11	19 – Kalkbrenner	12 – Kaluma	3 – Kaluma	Madison Square Garden (19,812); New York, NY
NCAA tournament
March 17, 2022; 7:27 p.m., TruTV	(9 MW)	vs. (8 MW) San Diego State; First Round	W 72–69 ^{OT}	23–11	18 – Alexander	10 – Kalkbrenner	5 – Alexander	Dickies Arena (10,560); Fort Worth, TX
March 19, 2022; 1:40 pm, CBS	(9 MW)	vs. (1 MW) No. 3 Kansas; Second Round	L 72–79	23–12	24 – Kaluma	12 – Kaluma	9 – Alexander	Dickies Arena (12,976); Fort Worth, TX
*Non-conference game. ^{#}Rankings from AP Poll. (#) Tournament seedings in parentheses. All times are in Central Time.

== Awards and honors ==
=== Big East Conference honors ===
==== All-Big East Awards ====
- Freshman of the Year: Ryan Nembhard
- Defensive Player of the Year: Ryan Kalkbrenner

==== All-Big East Second Team ====
- Ryan Hawkins

==== All-Big East Honorable Mention ====
- Ryan Kalkbrenner

==== Big East All-Freshman Team ====
- Trey Alexander
- Arthur Kaluma
- Ryan Nembhard
