= Qudus Wahab =

Nigerian basketball player (born 2000)

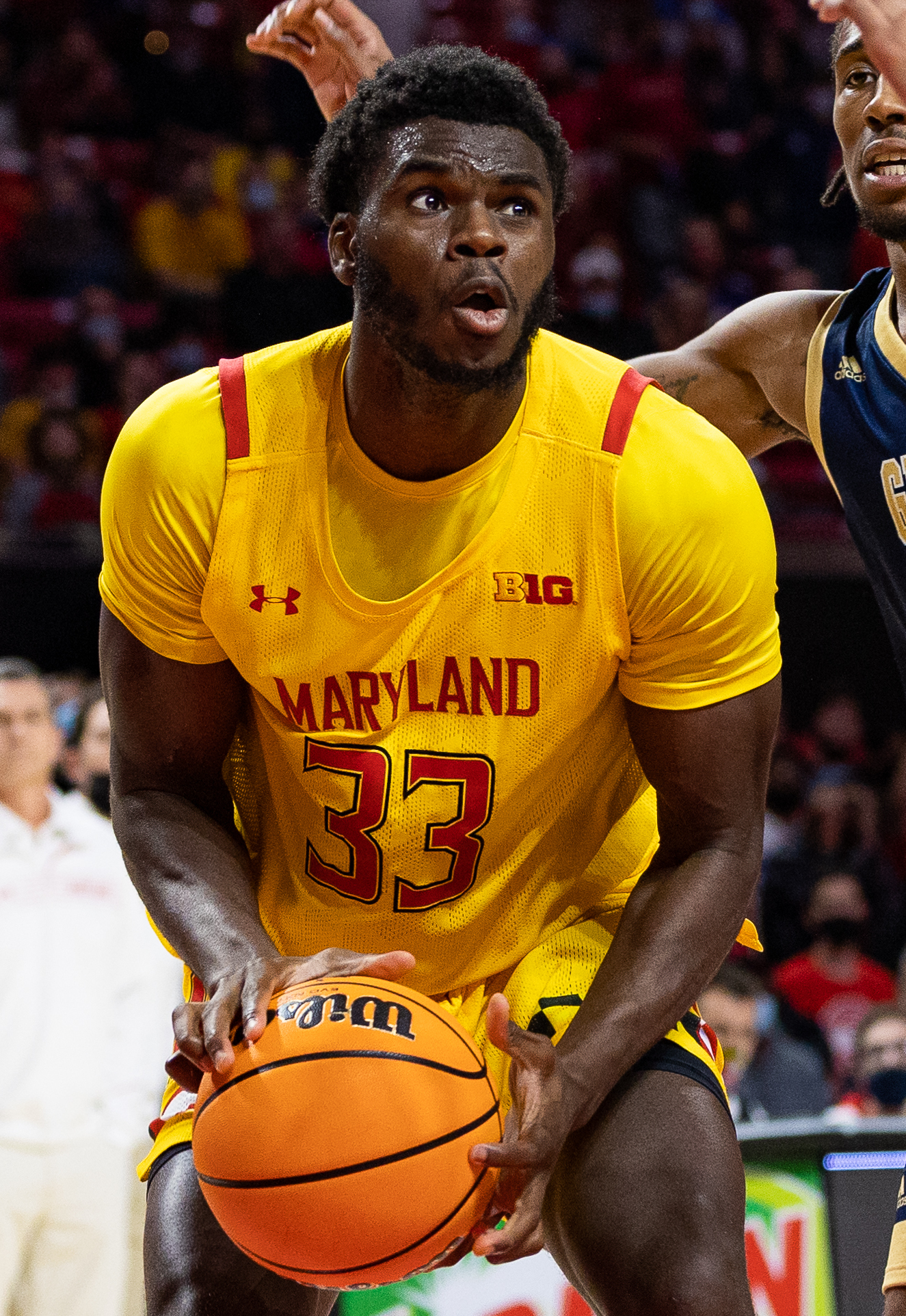
- Wahab with Maryland in 2021

No. 22 – Maccabi Ashdod
- Position: Center
- League: Israeli Basketball Premier League

Personal information
- Born: 30 January 2000 (age 26) Lagos, Nigeria
- Listed height: 6 ft 11 in (2.11 m)
- Listed weight: 240 lb (109 kg)

Career information
- High school: Virginia Academy (Ashburn, Virginia); Flint Hill (Oakton, Virginia)
- College: Georgetown (2019–2021); Maryland (2021–2022); Georgetown (2022–2023); Penn State (2023–2024)
- NBA draft: 2024: undrafted
- Playing career: 2024–present

Career history
- 2024–2025: Lavrio
- 2025–2026: Cholet Basket
- 2026–present: Maccabi Ashdod

Career highlights
- Greek League blocks leader (2025); Honorable mention All-Big Ten (2024); Big East Tournament champion (2021); Big East All-Tournament Team (2021)

Qudus Abolaji Wahab (born 30 January 2000) is a Nigerian professional basketball player for Maccabi Ashdod of the Israeli Basketball Premier League.

He played college basketball for the Georgetown Hoyas, Maryland Terrapins, and Penn State Nittany Lions. Following his college career, he began playing professionally overseas in Greece with Lavrio—where he led the Greek Basket League in blocks—and later played in France for Cholet Basket before signing with Maccabi Ashdod in 2026.

== Early life and high school career ==
Wahab was raised in Lagos, Nigeria, spending the first 15 years of his life there before moving to the United States with no formal basketball training, leaving behind his mother, twin brothers, and sister. He began his high school career at the Virginia Academy in Ashburn, Virginia, where he played for two seasons before transferring to the Flint Hill School in Oakton, Virginia, for his junior and senior years.

At Flint Hill, Wahab averaged a double-double and led the Huskies to back-to-back Mid-Atlantic Athletic Conference (MAC) regular-season titles as well as the 2019 MAC Tournament championship. As a junior, he earned all-state honors and Fourth Team All-Met recognition from The Washington Post. Following his senior season, he was named First Team All-State and First Team All-Met.

A consensus four-star recruit in the class of 2019, Wahab was ranked No. 123 overall by Rivals.com and No. 124 by 247Sports. Wahab committed to Georgetown under head coach Patrick Ewing on January 30, 2019, his 19th birthday, over UConn, Pittsburgh, and Syracuse.

College recruiting
Name	Hometown	School	Height	Weight	Commit date
Qudus Wahab; C	Lagos, Nigeria	Flint Hill School (VA)	6 ft 10 in (2.08 m)	230 lb (100 kg)	Jan 30, 2019
Qudus Wahab; C	Recruit ratings: Rivals: 247Sports: ESPN: (82)				
Overall recruit ranking: Rivals: 123 247Sports: 124 ESPN: —
Note: In many cases, Scout, Rivals, 247Sports, On3, and ESPN may conflict in their listings of height and weight.; In these cases, the average was taken. ESPN grades are on a 100-point scale.; Sources: "Georgetown 2019 Basketball Commits". Rivals.; "2019 Georgetown Hoyas Recruiting Class". ESPN.; "2019 Team Ranking". Rivals.

== College career ==
=== Georgetown (first stint) ===
As a freshman during the 2019–20 season, Wahab played in 32 games, starting 7, and averaged 5.5 points, 4.3 rebounds, 0.9 blocks (9th in the conference) and 14.7 minutes per game, with 30 blocks, while shooting 58.3% from the floor. On February 8, 2020, he recorded six points, eight rebounds, and a career-high six blocks in a 76–72 win over DePaul. He recorded his first career double-double against Creighton on March 4, 2020, posting season highs of 14 points and 12 rebounds in a 91–76 loss.

Wahab broke out during his sophomore season, playing in 26 games with 25 starts and averaging 12.7 points, a team-leading 8.2 rebounds (3rd in the conference), 27.7 minutes, and 1.6 blocks (3rd) per game, while shooting 59.1% from the floor. He averaged 14.3 points and 8.3 rebounds across four games during the 2021 Big East men's basketball tournament, earning All-Tournament Team honors as Georgetown won the championship and advanced to the 2021 NCAA tournament. He recorded a career-high 20 points along with 12 rebounds in Georgetown's 96–73 first-round loss against Colorado. Following the 2020–21 season, he elected to enter the NCAA transfer portal on March 25, 2021.

=== Maryland ===
On April 3, 2021, Wahab announced his transfer to Maryland to play under head coach Mark Turgeon. Entering the 2021–22 season on the Kareem Abdul-Jabbar Award watch list, he recorded 18 points and 15 rebounds in a 71–64 win over George Washington on November 11, 2021. After Turgeon stepped down in December 2021 and Danny Manning took over as interim head coach, Wahab's minutes decreased as the Terrapins finished 15–17. Across 32 games (31 starts), he averaged 7.7 points, 5.6 rebounds, and 19.3 minutes per game while shooting 55.9% from the field. Following the hiring of new head coach Kevin Willard, Wahab re-entered the NCAA transfer portal on March 31, 2022.

=== Georgetown (second stint) ===
Wahab returned to Georgetown on May 23, 2022, reuniting with head coach Patrick Ewing. During the 2022–23 season, he played in 29 games with 25 starts, averaging 9.6 points and 7.1 rebounds (7th in the conference) in 23.4 minutes per game while shooting 51.1 percent from the field and a career-best 71.2 percent from the free-throw line. He recorded 15 double-digit scoring games and four double-doubles, highlighted by a career-high 23 points in 24 minutes in a 69–62 win over La Salle on November 20, 2022. After Ewing was dismissed at the conclusion of the season, Wahab re-entered the transfer portal.

=== Penn State ===
On April 28, 2023, Wahab signed with Penn State under head coach Mike Rhoades. During the 2023–24 season, he started all 33 games and averaged 9.8 points, 7.8 rebounds (5th in the conference), and 1.5 blocks (7th) per game while leading the Nittany Lions in field goal percentage (59.4%) and double-doubles (five). On November 10, 2023, he posted 11 points and a career-high 18 rebounds in a 74–65 win over Lehigh, and later recorded a season-high 19 points and 15 rebounds in an 85–69 Senior Night victory over former team Maryland on March 10, 2024.

Wahab was named honorable mention All-Big Ten, earned a selection to the National Association of Basketball Coaches (NABC) Honors Court, and finished his collegiate career with 1,352 points and 994 rebounds.

== Professional career ==
=== Lavrio (2024–2025) ===
Wahab began his professional career in Greece with Lavrio of the Greek Basket League for the 2024–25 season. In 28 total league games (22 regular-season games and 6 playout games), he averaged 9.9 points, 7.0 rebounds, and 1.1 blocks (leading the league) in 24.5 minutes per game while shooting 72.5% from the field.

=== Cholet Basket (2025–2026) ===
On July 10, 2025, Wahab signed a one-year contract with Cholet Basket of the French LNB Élite. During the 2025–26 season, he played in 30 regular-season games, averaging 5.6 points and 4.2 rebounds in 16.6 minutes per game while shooting 58.2% from the field, and added 4.3 points and 3.7 rebounds in 6 playoff games as Cholet reached the league semifinals. He also played in 8 Basketball Champions League games, averaging 6.4 points and 5.6 rebounds per contest.

=== Maccabi Ashdod (2026–present) ===
In July 2026, Wahab signed with Maccabi Ashdod of the Israeli Basketball Premier League for the 2026–27 season.

== Career statistics ==
Legend
GP	Games played	GS	Games started	MPG	Minutes per game
FG%	Field goal percentage	3P%	3-point field goal percentage	FT%	Free throw percentage
RPG	Rebounds per game	APG	Assists per game	SPG	Steals per game
BPG	Blocks per game	PPG	Points per game	**Bold**	Career high

=== College ===
Year	Team	GP	GS	MPG	FG%	3P%	FT%	RPG	APG	SPG	BPG	PPG
2019–20	Georgetown	**32**	7	14.7	.583	–	.632	4.3	.3	.3	.9	5.5
2020–21	Georgetown	26	25	**27.7**	**.591**	–	.673	**8.2**	.2	.4	**1.6**	**12.7**
2021–22	Maryland	**32**	**31**	19.3	.559	.000	.667	5.6	.4	.2	.8	7.7
2022–23	Georgetown	29	25	23.4	.511	.000	**.712**	7.1	.4	.6	.7	9.6
2023–24	Penn State	**33**	**33**	25.6	.594	.000	.710	7.8	**.5**	**.8**	1.5	9.8
Career		152	121	21.9	.568	.000	.685	6.5	.4	.5	1.1	8.9
