= Milton High School (Georgia) =

Public high school in Milton, Fulton County, Georgia, United States

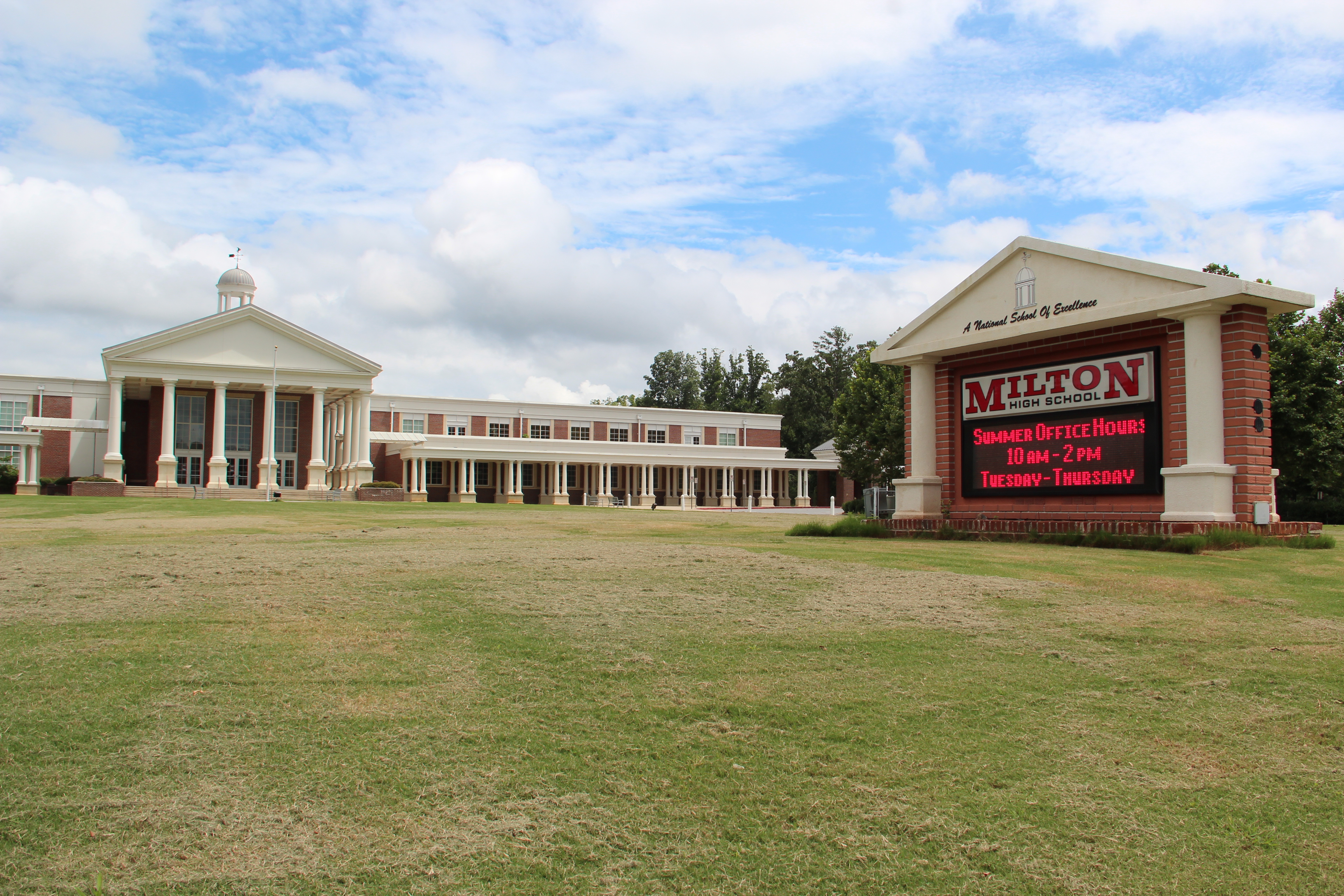
- Milton High School front lawn

Location
- 13025 Birmingham Highway; Milton, Georgia 30004; United States; 34°05′54″N 84°20′10″W

Information
- Type: Public
- Motto: Rep the M
- Established: 1921
- School district: Fulton County School System
- CEEB code: 110060
- NCES School ID: 130228001005
- Principal: Brian Jones
- Teaching staff: 108.70 (on an FTE basis)
- Grades: 9–12
- Enrollment: 1,999 (2024–2025)
- Student to teacher ratio: 18.39
- Colors: Red, white and navy blue
- Athletics conference: Georgia High School Association
- Mascot: Eddie the Eagle
- Team name: Eagles
- Website: Milton High School

Milton High School is a four-year public high school in Milton, Georgia, United States.

== History ==
Milton High School opened in 1921 in Alpharetta, Georgia, providing grades one to eleven for all of Milton County. In the 1950s, an elementary school was built, with Milton High School then providing only grades eight through twelve. In the 1980s, the school became Fulton County's first comprehensive high school. The school was named a School of Excellence in the 1997–98 school year by the Georgia Department of Education, and an outstanding high school the following year by the U.S. News & World Report. A new campus, using the academy model, was opened in Milton in 2005, starting with freshmen only the first year. Milton High School no longer offers grade eight.

== Activities ==
Milton High School competes in Class 5A, Region 7 of the Georgia High School Association.

=== State sports championships ===
- Baseball: 1955, 2004, 2013
- Basketball (boys'): 2010, 2012, 2021
- Cheerleading (coed): 2017
- Cross Country (boys'): 2017,2024
- Football: 2018, 2023, 2024
- Golf (boys'): 2012,2021,2022,2023,2024
- Golf (girls'): 2012
- Gymnastics: 1990, 1991, 1998, 1999
- Lacrosse (boys'): 2010, 2012
- Lacrosse (girls'): 2005, 2006, 2007, 2008, 2010, 2011, 2012, 2013, 2014, 2015, 2017, 2018, 2019, 2021, 2022, 2023, 2024,2025,2026
- Soccer (girls'): 2012
- Tennis (boys'): 1985 (tied), 2003
- Tennis (girls'): 1980 (three-way tie), 1983 (tie), 1985 (three-way tie),2025 ,2026
- Wrestling: 1978

=== State activity championships ===
- Debate: 2001, 2002, 2009
- One Act Play: 2011, 2012, 2013, 2014, 2017, 2021–22, 2023

== Notable alumni ==
- Peyton Barber (class of 2013), National Football League (NFL) running back
- Belle Briede (class of 2017), professional soccer player, NWSL
- Dylan Cease (class of 2014), Major League Baseball (MLB) pitcher
- Nadine Jolie Courtney (class of 1998), author and screenwriter
- John Dewberry (class of 1981), University of Georgia (1981–1982) Georgia Tech (1982–1986) 1984 All ACC Quarterback
- Kyle Farnsworth (class of 1994), Major League Baseball player
- Dexter Fowler (class of 2004), Major League Baseball player
- McKenzie Kurtz (class of 2015), Broadway actress
- Carl Lawson (class of 2013), New York Jets outside linebacker
- Jordan Loyd (born 1993), basketball player for Maccabi Tel Aviv of the Israeli Basketball Premier League
- Bryan Nesbitt (class of 1987), automobile designer
- Alex O'Connell (class of 2017), professional basketball player
- LT Overton (class of 2022), college football player
- Graham Pauley (class of 2019), Major League Baseball player
- Daniel Pope (class of 1994), former punter in the National Football League; played for Kansas City Chiefs, Cincinnati Bengals, New York Jets, with his longest NFL punt being 64 yards
- Danyelle Sargent (class of 1995), Fox News sports reporter
- Bobby Scales (class of 1995), Major League Baseball player
- Shannon Scott (class of 2011), Ohio State / Toronto Raptors basketball player
- Bruce Thornton (class of 2022), basketball player
- Michael Waldron (class of 2006), screenwriter and producer known for his work on Rick and Morty, Loki (TV series), Heels (TV series), and Doctor Strange in the Multiverse of Madness
