= All-Big Ten =

All-Big Ten may refer to:

- List of All-Big Ten Conference men's basketball teams
- List of All-Big Ten Conference football teams
- List of All-Big Ten Hockey Teams
