= Aminu Mohammed =

Ghanaian footballer

Personal information
- Full name: Aminu Ibrahim Mohammed
- Date of birth: 27 November 1993 (age 32)
- Place of birth: Kumasi, Ghana
- Height: 1.75 m (5 ft 9 in)
- Position: Midfielder

Team information
- Current team: Kırşehirspor is
- Number: 20

Youth career
- 2011–2013: Rayo Vallecano B

Senior career*
Years	Team	Apps	(Gls)
2014–2016	Liberty Professionals F.C.	31	(6)
2016–	Kırşehirspor is	21	(3)

International career
2010–2012	Ghana U20	4	(0)
- * Club domestic league appearances and goals as of 1 August 2017

Aminu Ibrahim Mohammed (born 27 November 1993) is a Ghanaian International footballer who plays for Kırşehirspor is in Turkey and is a defensive midfielder.

== Club career ==
Aminu began his club career with Spanish club Rayo Vallecano B. in 2011, after 2 seasons at Rayo Vallecano B, Aminu joined Liberty Professionals F.C. In his homeland Ghana, where he played for 2 seasons. He left Liberty Professionals F.C. in 2016 and joined Turkish club Kırşehirspor is football Club where he signed 2 seasons.

== International career ==
Aminu made his debut for Ghana U20 in 2012.

== Style of play ==
His game has a particular dependence on sheer strength, power and energy. He can produce the work rate, ball retrieval and attacking willingness of the box-to-box midfielder.
