= Alex O'Connell (basketball) =

American basketball player (born 1999)

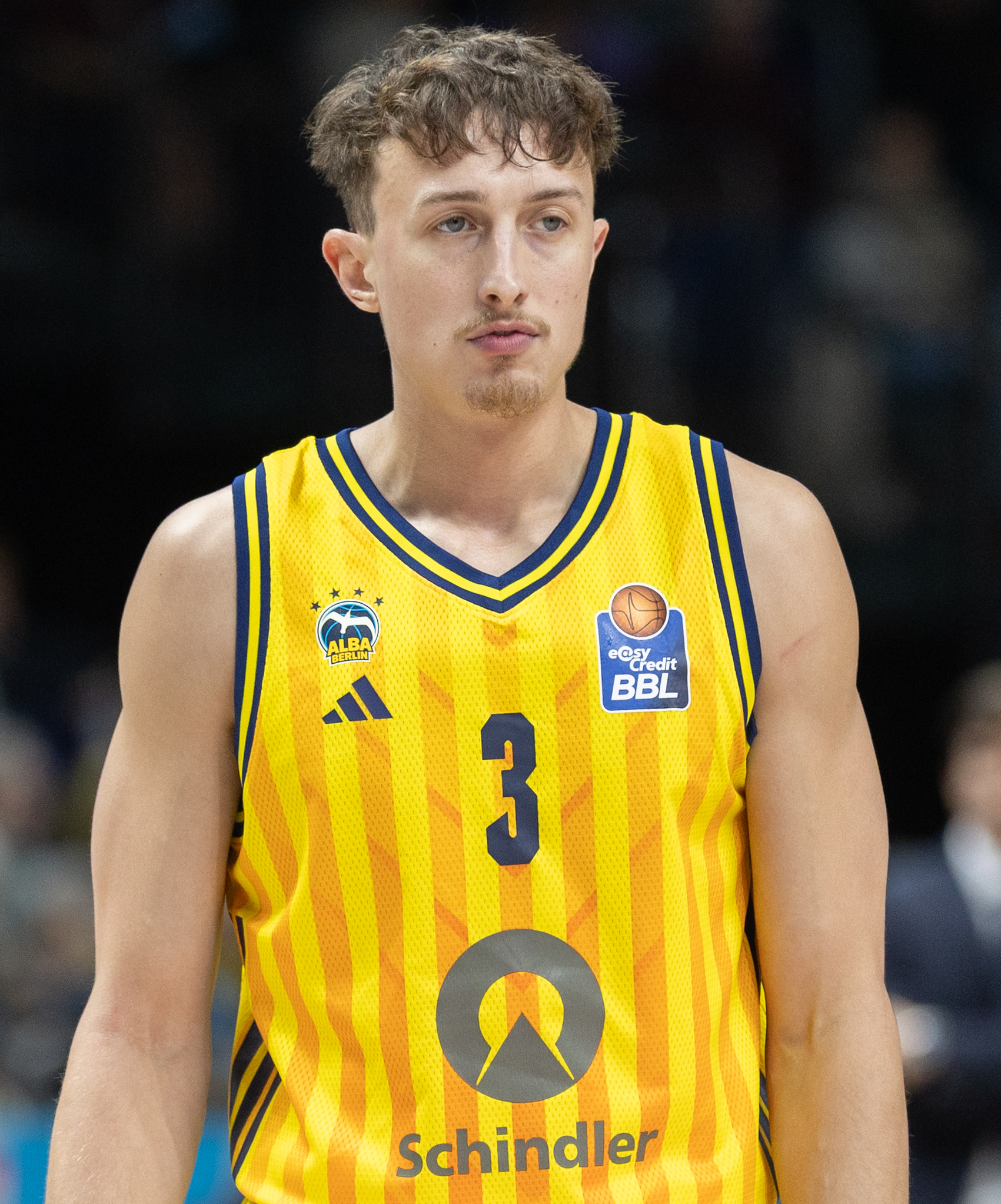
- O'Connell with ALBA Berlin in 2025.

No. 3 – Alba Berlin
- Position: Shooting guard
- League: BBL

Personal information
- Born: June 2, 1999 (age 27) Baltimore, Maryland, U.S.
- Listed height: 6 ft 6 in (1.98 m)
- Listed weight: 185 lb (84 kg)

Career information
- High school: Milton (Milton, Georgia)
- College: Duke (2017–2020); Creighton (2021–2022)
- NBA draft: 2022: undrafted
- Playing career: 2022–present

Career history
- 2022–2023: Stockton Kings
- 2023–2024: Umana Reyer Venezia
- 2024–2025: Westchester Knicks
- 2025-present: Alba Berlin

Career highlights
- NBA G League Winter Showcase champion (2024)
- Stats at NBA.com
- Stats at Basketball Reference

Alex David O'Connell (born June 2, 1999) is an American professional basketball player for Alba Berlin of the German Basketball Bundesliga (BBL). He played college basketball for the Duke Blue Devils and Creighton Bluejays.

== High school career ==
O'Connell attended Milton High School in Milton, Georgia 30 miles north of Atlanta. As a junior, he averaged 22.1 points, 8.5 rebounds and 3.0 assists per game earning Georgia Class 6A All-State honors.

=== Recruiting ===
O'Connell was rated as four-star recruit in the class of 2017. On August 26, 2016, O'Connell committed to Duke, over other offers from Louisville, Syracuse, and UCLA.

College recruiting
Name	Hometown	School	Height	Weight	Commit date
Alex O'Connell; SG	Milton, GA	Milton High School	6 ft 6 in (1.98 m)	170 lb (77 kg)	Aug 26, 2016
Alex O'Connell; SG	Recruit ratings: Scout: Rivals: 247Sports: ESPN: (83)				
Overall recruit ranking: Rivals: 58 247Sports: 65 ESPN: 87
Note: In many cases, Scout, Rivals, 247Sports, On3, and ESPN may conflict in their listings of height and weight.; In these cases, the average was taken. ESPN grades are on a 100-point scale.; Sources: "Duke 2017 Basketball Commitments". Rivals.; "2017 Duke Blue Devils Recruiting Class". ESPN.; "2017 Team Ranking". Rivals.

== College career ==
=== Duke (2017–2020) ===
In his freshman season at Duke, O'Connell averaged 3.3 points and 1.4 rebounds per game playing behind Grayson Allen. As a sophomore, O'Connell saw more minutes and became a key reserve player for the 2018-19 team where he averaged 5.9 points and 2.3 rebounds per game. In his Junior season, O'Connell appeared in 29 games averaging 5.2 points, 2.2 rebounds while shooting 40% from the field and 27% from 3-point range.

=== Creighton (2021–2022) ===
On April 8, 2020, O'Connell transferred to Creighton. On January 19, 2022, O'Connell scored 28 points and 7 rebounds in a 87–64 win against St. John's. On February 14, 2022, O'Connell scored 27 points and 3 rebounds in a 88–77 victory over Georgetown.

== Professional career ==
=== Stockton Kings (2022–2023) ===
After going undrafted in the 2022 NBA draft, O'Connell signed with the Sacramento Kings on October 14, 2022, but was waived the next day. On October 24, he joined the Stockton Kings.

=== Umana Reyer Venezia (2023–2024) ===
On July 20, 2023, O'Connell signed with Umana Reyer Venezia of the Lega Basket Serie A.

=== Westchester Knicks (2024–2025) ===
On October 2, 2024, O'Connell signed with the New York Knicks, but was waived on October 9. On October 28, he joined the Westchester Knicks.

=== ALBA Berlin (2025–present) ===
On November 5, 2025, O'Connell signed with ALBA Berlin of Basketball Bundesliga.

== Personal life ==
O'Connell's father David also played college basketball at Duke from 1973 to 1976.
