= United States at the 2019 Pan American Games =

- IOC code: USA
- NOC: United States Olympic Committee

in Lima, Peru July 26 – August 11, 2019
- Competitors: 636 in 39 sports
- Flag bearer: Kathleen Sharkey
- Medals Ranked 1st: Gold 122 Silver 87 Bronze 84 Total 293

Pan American Games appearances (overview)
- 1951; 1955; 1959; 1963; 1967; 1971; 1975; 1979; 1983; 1987; 1991; 1995; 1999; 2003; 2007; 2011; 2015; 2019; 2023; 2027

The United States competed in the 2019 Pan American Games in Lima, Peru from July 26 to August 11, 2019. The team included 313 men and 327 women.

The United States traditionally fielded its B or C teams in the most of sports. In basketball, the US men's team was made up of U20 Big East collegiate players, who were blown out by a senior professional Argentine team in the semi-final, but still managed to win bronze against the Dominican Republic.

The United States 4x100 mixed medley relay swimming team originally won the gold medal, however it was disqualified for two alleged breaststroke kicks off the turn. USA Swimming voiced their disagreement with the decision, but they were not allowed to appeal.

The United States topped the medal count with 122 gold and 293 overall medals, its best result in the 21st century.

== Medalists ==
The following U.S. competitors won medals at the games. In the by discipline sections below, medalists' names are bolded.

Medal	Name	Sport	Event	Date
Gold	Jakob Butturff; Nick Pate	Bowling	Men's doubles	July 27
Gold	Stefanie Johnson; Shannon O'Keefe	Bowling	Women's doubles	July 27
Gold	Kara Eaker; Aleah Finnegan; Morgan Hurd; Riley McCusker; Leanne Wong	Gymnastics	Women's artistic team all-around	July 27
Gold	Amanda Sobhy	Squash	Women's singles	July 27
Gold	Alex Lee	Taekwondo	Men's poomsae individual	July 27
Gold	Sarah Beard	Shooting	Women's 50 meter rifle three position	July 28
Gold	Chris Hanson; Todd Harrity	Squash	Men's doubles	July 28
Gold	Amanda Sobhy; Sabrina Sobhy	Squash	Women's doubles	July 28
Gold	Anastasija Zolotic	Taekwondo	Women's −57 kg	July 28
Gold	Alex Lee; Andrew Lee; Karyn Real; Ethan Sun; Yi Sae-Jin	Taekwondo	Mixed poomsae freestyle team	July 28
Gold	United States men's national 3x3 team: Sheldon Jeter; Dominique Jones; Kareem Maddox; Jonathan Ocetus	Basketball	Men's 3x3 tournament	July 29
Gold	United States women's national 3x3 team: Ruth Hebard; Sabrina Ionescu; Olivia Nelson; Christyn Williams	Basketball	Women's 3x3 tournament	July 29
Gold	Samantha Achterberg; Jessica Davis	Modern pentathlon	Women's relay	July 29
Gold	Ashley Carroll	Shooting	Women's trap	July 29
Gold	Jonathan Healy	Taekwondo	Men's +80 kg	July 29
Gold	Taylor Garcia	Water skiing	Men's jump	July 29
Gold	Regina Jaquess	Water skiing	Women's slalom	July 29
Gold	Regina Jaquess	Water skiing	Women's jump	July 29
Gold	Wesley Kitts	Weightlifting	Men's −109 kg	July 29
Gold	Karissa Cook; Jace Pardon	Beach volleyball	Women's tournament	July 30
Gold	Nick Pate	Bowling	Men's singles	July 30
Gold	Nevin Harrison	Canoeing	Women's C-1 200 meters	July 30
Gold	Riley McCusker	Gymnastics	Uneven bars	July 30
Gold	Amro El Geziry; Isabella Isaksen	Modern pentathlon	Mixed relay	July 30
Gold	Tim Sherry	Shooting	Men's 50 meter rifle three position	July 30
Gold	Brian Burrows	Shooting	Men's trap	July 30
Gold	Andrew Adikson	Water skiing	Men's wakeboard	July 30
Gold	Regina Jaquess	Water skiing	Women's overall	July 30
Gold	Sarah Robles	Weightlifting	Women's +87 kg	July 30
Gold	Sarah Lockman	Equestrian	Individual dressage	July 31
Gold	Kara Eaker	Gymnastics	Women's balance beam	July 31
Gold	Ashley Carroll; Derek Haldeman	Shooting	Mixed trap	July 31
Gold	Andrew Douglas; Chris Hanson; Todd Harrity	Squash	Men's team	July 31
Gold	Olivia Blatchford; Amanda Sobhy; Sabrina Sobhy	Squash	Women's team	July 31
Gold	Oshae Jones	Boxing	Women's −69 kg	August 1
Gold	Daniel Holloway	Cycling	Men's omnium	August 1
Gold	Alison Weisz	Shooting	Women's 10 meter air rifle	August 1
Gold	Naomi Graham	Boxing	Women's −75 kg	August 2
Gold	Christina Birch; Kimberly Geist; Chloé Owen; Lily Williams	Cycling	Women's team pursuit	August 2
Gold	Sarah Bacon	Diving	Women's 1 meter springboard	August 2
Gold	Lucas Kozeniesky	Shooting	Men's 10 meter air rifle	August 2
Gold	Kim Rhode	Shooting	Women's skeet	August 2
Gold	Connor Baxter	Surfing	Men's standup paddleboard race	August 2
Gold	John Croom; Adrian Hegyvary; Gavin Hoover; Ashton Lambie; Daniel Summerhill	Cycling	Men's team pursuit	August 3
Gold	Jennifer Valente	Cycling	Women's omnium	August 3
Gold	Evita Griskenas	Gymnastics	Rhythmic individual all-around	August 3
Gold	Christian Elliot	Shooting	Men's skeet	August 3
Gold	Sandra Uptagrafft	Shooting	Women's 25 meter pistol	August 3
Gold	Usue Arconada; Caroline Dolehide	Tennis	Women's doubles	August 3
Gold	Zachary Lokken	Canoeing	Men's slalom C-1	August 4
Gold	Evy Leibfarth	Canoeing	Women's slalom K-1	August 4
Gold	Christina Birch; Kimberly Geist	Cycling	Women's madison	August 4
Gold	Boyd Martin	Equestrian	Individual eventing	August 4
Gold	Boyd Martin; Doug Payne; Tamie Smith; Lynn Symansky	Equestrian	Team eventing	August 4
Gold	Evita Griskenas	Gymnastics	Ball	August 4
Gold	Evita Griskenas	Gymnastics	Hoop	August 4
Gold	Lee Kiefer	Fencing	Women's individual foil	August 5
Gold	Camilla Feeley	Gymnastics	Clubs	August 5
Gold	Evita Griskenas	Gymnastics	Ribbon	August 5
Gold	Gerek Meinhardt	Fencing	Men's individual foil	August 6
Gold	Anne-Elizabeth Stone	Fencing	Women' individual sabre	August 6
Gold	Andrew Abruzzo	Swimming	Men's 400 meter freestyle	August 6
Gold	Anne Lazor	Swimming	Women's 100 meter breaststroke	August 6
Gold	Margo Geer; Lia Neal; Meaghan Raab; Claire Rasmus	Swimming	Women's 4 ×100 meter freestyle relay	August 6
Gold	Mike Rogers	Athletics	Men's 100 meters	August 7
Gold	Chloé Owen	Cycling	Women's time trial	August 7
Gold	Daryl Homer	Fencing	Men's individual sabre	August 7
Gold	Katharine Holmes	Fencing	Women's individual épée	August 7
Gold	Daniel Carr	Swimming	Men's 200 meter backstroke	August 7
Gold	Tom Shields	Swimming	Men's 100 meter butterfly	August 7
Gold	Claire Rasmus	Swimming	Women's 200 meter freestyle	August 7
Gold	Alexandra Walsh	Swimming	Women's 200 meter backstroke	August 7
Gold	Kendyl Stewart	Swimming	Women's 100 meter butterfly	August 7
Gold	Andrew Abruzzo*; Nathan Adrian; Michael Chadwick; Ali DeLoof*; Margo Geer; Madison Kennedy*; Claire Rasmus; Charles Swanson*	Swimming	Mixed 4 × 100 meter freestyle relay	August 7
Gold	Pat Smith	Wrestling	Greco-Roman 77 kg	August 7
Gold	Jacqueline Dubrovich; Lee Kiefer; Nicole Ross	Fencing	Women's team foil	August 8
Gold	Andrew Abruzzo	Swimming	Men's 800 meter freestyle	August 8
Gold	Daniel Carr	Swimming	Men's 100 meter backstroke	August 8
Gold	Will Licon	Swimming	Men's 200 meter breaststroke	August 8
Gold	Margo Geer	Swimming	Women's 100 meter freestyle	August 8
Gold	Phoebe Bacon	Swimming	Women's 100 meter backstroke	August 8
Gold	Anne Lazor	Swimming	Women's 200 meter breaststroke	August 8
Gold	Whitney Conder	Wrestling	Women's 50 kg	August 8
Gold	Sarah Hildebrandt	Wrestling	Women's 53 kg	August 8
Gold	Nikki Hiltz	Athletics	Women's 1500 meters	August 9
Gold	Kara Winger	Athletics	Women's javelin throw	August 9
Gold	Race Imboden; Nick Itkin; Gerek Meinhardt	Fencing	Men's team foil	August 9
Gold	Monica Aksamit; Chloe Fox-Gitomer; Anne-Elizabeth Stone	Fencing	Women's team sabre	August 9
Gold	Sakura Kokumai	Karate	Women's individual kata	August 9
Gold	Riley Gibbs; Anna Weis	Sailing	Nacra 17	August 9
Gold	Charles Swanson	Swimming	Men's 400 meter individual medley	August 9
Gold	Sarah Gibson; Meaghan Raab; Claire Rasmus; Alexandra Walsh	Swimming	Women's 4 × 200 meter freestyle relay	August 9
Gold	Daton Fix	Wrestling	Men's freestyle 57 kg	August 9
Gold	Kayla Miracle	Wrestling	Women's 62 kg	August 9
Gold	Tamyra Mensah-Stock	Wrestling	Women's 68 kg	August 9
Gold	Omar Craddock	Athletics	Men's triple jump	August 10
Gold	Chris Nilsen	Athletics	Men's pole vault	August 10
Gold	Anna Cockrell; Lynna Irby; Courtney Okolo; Jaide Stepter	Athletics	Women's 4 × 400 meter relay	August 10
Gold	Gwen Berry	Athletics	Women's hammer throw	August 10
Gold	Eli Dershwitz; Daryl Homer; Jeff Spear	Fencing	Men's team sabre	August 10
Gold	Katharine Holmes; Catherine Nixon; Isis Washington	Fencing	Women's team épée	August 10
Gold	Kamran Madani	Karate	Men's −84 kg	August 10
Gold	Brian Irr	Karate	Men's +84 kg	August 10
Gold	Shannon Nishi	Karate	Women's −50 kg	August 10
Gold	Ernesto Rodriguez; Hallie Schiffman	Sailing	Snipe	August 10
Gold	United States women's national softball team: Monica Abbott; Alison Aguilar; Valerie Arioto; Rachel Garcia; Sahvanna Jaquish; Haylie McCleney; Kirsti Merritt; Michelle Moultrie; Dejah Mulipola; Aubree Munro; Cat Osterman; Janie Reed; Keilani Ricketts; Delaney Spaulding; Kelsey Stewart	Softball	Women's tournament	August 10
Gold	Will Licon	Swimming	Men's 200 meter individual medley	August 10
Gold	Nathan Adrian; Nick Alexander*; Daniel Carr; Michael Chadwick*; Nic Fink; Matthew Josa*; Tom Shields	Swimming	Men's 4 × 100 meter medley relay	August 10
Gold	Alexandra Walsh	Swimming	Women's 200 metre individual medley	August 10
Gold	Phoebe Bacon; Margo Geer; Sarah Gibson*; Molly Hannis*; Anne Lazor; Lia Neal*; Isabelle Stadden*; Kendyl Stewart	Swimming	Women's 4 × 100 meter medley relay	August 10
Gold	Kanak Jha; Nikhil Kumar; Nicholas Tio	Table tennis	Men's team	August 10
Gold	United States men's national water polo team: Alexander Bowen; Luca Cupido; Hannes Daube; Benjamin Hallock; Jonathan Hooper; Maxwell Irving; Alexander Obert; Chancellor Ramirez; Jesse Smith; Marko Vavic; Alexander Wolf	Water polo	Men's tournament	August 10
Gold	United States women's national water polo team: Rachel Fattal; Aria Fischer; Makenzie Fischer; Stephania Haralabidis; Ashleigh Johnson; Maddie Musselman; Jamie Neushul; Kiley Neushul; Melissa Seidemann; Maggie Steffens; Alys Williams	Water polo	Women's tournament	August 10
Gold	Jordan Burroughs	Wrestling	Men's freestyle 74 kg	August 10
Gold	Kyle Snyder	Wrestling	Men's freestyle 97 kg	August 10
Gold	Nick Gwiazdowski	Wrestling	Men's freestyle 125 kg	August 10
Gold	Casey Kaufhold; Khatuna Lorig; Erin Mickelberry	Archery	Women's team recurve	August 11
Gold	Brady Ellison; Casey Kaufhold	Archery	Mixed team recurve	August 11
Gold	Hannah Roberts	Cycling	Women's BMX freestyle	August 11
Gold	Emilia Migliaccio	Golf	Women's individual	August 11
Gold	Stewart Hagestad; Emilia Migliaccio; Brandon Wu; Rose Zhang	Golf	Mixed team	August 11
Gold	Tom Scott	Karate	Men's −75 kg	August 11
Silver	Bethany Sacthleben	Athletics	Women's marathon	July 27
Silver	Samantha Achterberg	Modern pentathlon	Women's individual	July 27
Silver	John Burchfield	Roller sports	Men's artistic	July 27
Silver	Olivia Blatchford	Squash	Women's singles	July 27
Silver	Cameron Bock; Grant Breckenridge; Brody Malone; Robert Neff; Genki Suzuki	Gymnastics	Men's artistic team all-around	July 28
Silver	United States women's national rugby sevens team: Kayla Canett-Oca; Cheta Emba; Abby Gustatis; Emily Henrich; Kristi Kirshe; Ilona Maher; Jordan Matyas; Alena Olsen; Ariana Ramsey; Stephanie Rovetti; Naya Tapper; Lauren Thunen	Rugby sevens	Women's tournament	July 28
Silver	Nick Mowrer	Shooting	Men's 10 meter air pistol	July 28
Silver	Nora Batchelder; Jennifer Baumert; Sarah Lockman	Equestrian	Team dressage	July 29
Silver	Riley McCusker	Gymnastics	Women's artistic individual all-around	July 29
Silver	Brendan Anderson; Amro El Geziry	Modern pentathlon	Men's relay	July 27
Silver	Rachel Tozier	Shooting	Women's trap	July 29
Silver	Nick Mowrer; Miglena Todorva	Shooting	Mixed 10 meter air pistol	July 29
Silver	Paige McPherson	Taekwondo	Women's −67 kg	July 27
Silver	Erika Lang	Water skiing	Women's tricks	July 29
Silver	Mary Howell	Water skiing	Women's wakeboard	July 29
Silver	Mattie Sasser	Weightlifting	Women's −64 kg	July 29
Silver	Robert Neff	Gymnastics	Men's floor	July 30
Silver	Robert Neff	Gymnastics	Men's pommel horse	July 30
Silver	Leanne Wong	Gymnastics	Women's uneven bars	July 30
Silver	Michael McPhail	Shooting	Men's 50 meter rifle three position	July 30
Silver	Derek Haldeman	Shooting	Men's trap	July 30
Silver	Kara Eaker	Gymnastics	Women's floor	July 31
Silver	Brian Burrows; Rachel Tozier	Shooting	Mixed trap	July 31
Silver	Sarah Bacon; Brooke Schultz	Diving	Women's synchronized 3 meter springboard	August 1
Silver	Minden Miles	Shooting	Women's 10 meter air rifle	August 1
Silver	United States men's national softball team: Kevin Castillo; Jenner Christiansen; Joel Cooley; Yusef Davis; Jonathan Lynch; Antonio Mancha; Nicholas Mullins; Jeffrey Nowaczyk; Erick Ochoa; Matt Palazzo; Matthew Ratliff; Gilbert Saenz; Cameron Schiller; Marcus Tan; Mervin Weiler	Softball	Men's tournament	August 1
Silver	Phillip Chew; Ryan Chew	Badminton	Men's doubles	August 2
Silver	Kuei-Ya Chen; Jamie Hsu	Badminton	Women's doubles	August 2
Silver	Duke Ragan	Boxing	Men's −56 kg	August 2
Silver	Keyshawn Davis	Boxing	Men's −64 kg	August 2
Silver	Virginia Fuchs	Boxing	Women's −51 kg	August 2
Silver	Brooke Schultz	Diving	Women's 1 meter springboard	August 2
Silver	Candice Appleby	Surfing	Women's standup paddleboard race	August 2
Silver	Camilla Feeley	Gymnastics	Rhythmic individual all-around	August 3
Silver	Isabelle Connor; Yelyzaveta Merenzon; Elizaveta Pletneva; Nicole Sladkov; Kristina Sobelevskaya	Gymnastics	Rhythmic group all-around	August 3
Silver	Lucas Kozeneisky; Minden Miles	Shooting	Mixed 10 meter air rifle	August 3
Silver	Josh Joseph	Canoeing	Men's extreme K-1	August 4
Silver	Evy Leibfarth	Canoeing	Women's extreme K-1	August 4
Silver	Adrian Hegyvary; Gavin Hoover	Cycling	Men's madison	August 4
Silver	Lynn Symansky	Equestrian	Individual eventing	August 4
Silver	Isabelle Connor; Yelyzaveta Merenzon; Elizaveta Pletneva; Nicole Sladkov; Kristina Sobelevskaya	Gymnastics	5 balls	August 4
Silver	Taylor Abbott	Swimming	Men's 10 kilometer open water	August 4
Silver	Caroline Dolehide	Tennis	Women's singles	August 4
Silver	Jeffrey Gluckstein	Gymnastics	Men's trampoline	August 5
Silver	Nicole Ahsinger	Gymnastics	Women's trampoline	August 5
Silver	Keturah Orji	Athletics	Women's long jump	August 6
Silver	Cody Miller	Swimming	Men's 100 meter breaststroke	August 6
Silver	Sam Pomajevich	Swimming	Men's 200 meter butterfly	August 6
Silver	Nathan Adrian; Michael Chadwick; Grant House; Drew Kibler	Swimming	Men's 4 × 100 meter freestyle relay	August 6
Silver	Amy Wang; Lily Zhang	Table tennis	Women's doubles	August 6
Silver	Jordan Geist	Athletics	Men's shot put	August 7
Silver	Nick Alexander	Swimming	Men's 200 meter backstroke	August 7
Silver	Meaghan Raab	Swimming	Women's 200 meter freestyle	August 7
Silver	Isabelle Stadden	Swimming	Women's 200 metre backstroke	August 7
Silver	Jennifer Wu	Table tennis	Women's singles	August 7
Silver	G'Angelo Hancock	Wrestling	Greco-Roman 97 kg	August 7
Silver	Johnny Gregorek	Athletics	Men's 1500 meters	August 8
Silver	Amere Lattin	Athletics	Men's 400 meter hurdles	August 8
Silver	Chanel Brissett	Athletics	Women's 100 meter hurdles	August 8
Silver	Anna Cockrell	Athletics	Women's 400 meter hurdles	August 8
Silver	Kathryn Nageotte	Athletics	Women's pole vault	August 8
Silver	Annie Kunz	Athletics	Heptathlon	August 8
Silver	Maggie Fellows; Julia Lonchar	Rowing	Women's double sculls	August 8
Silver	Nathan Adrian	Swimming	Men's 100 meter freestyle	August 8
Silver	Nic Fink	Swimming	Men's 200 meter breaststroke	August 8
Silver	Mariah Denigan	Swimming	Women's 800 meter freestyle	August 8
Silver	Bethany Galat	Swimming	Women's 200 meter breaststroke	August 8
Silver	Jenna Burkert	Wrestling	Women's 57 kg	August 8
Silver	Reid Buchanan	Athletics	Men's 10,000 meters	August 9
Silver	Ariel Torres	Karate	Men's individual kata	August 9
Silver	Pedro Pascual	Sailing	Men's RS:X	August 9
Silver	Charlotte Rose	Sailing	Laser radial	August 9
Silver	Nathan Adrian	Swimming	Men's 50 meter freestyle	August 9
Silver	Drew Kibler; Grant House; Sam Pomajevich; Chris Wieser	Swimming	Men's 4 × 200 meter freestyle relay	August 9
Silver	Margo Geer	Swimming	Women's 50 meter freestyle	August 9
Silver	Braden Gellenthien	Archery	Men's individual compound	August 10
Silver	Freddie Crittenden	Athletics	Men's 110 meter hurdles	August 10
Silver	Mar'Yea Harris; Wil London; Michael Cherry; Justin Robinson	Athletics	Men's 4 × 400 meter relay	August 10
Silver	Marisa Howard	Athletics	Women's 3000 meter steeplechase	August 10
Silver	Brooke Andersen	Athletics	Women's hammer throw	August 10
Silver	United States women's national basketball team: Isabella Alarie; Brittany Brewer; Chennedy Carter; Kathleen Doyle; Tyasha Harris; Taylor Mikesell; Beatrice Mompremier; Michaela Onyenwere; Mikayla Pivec; Lindsey Pulliam; Kiana Williams; Peyton Williams	Basketball	Women's tournament	August 10
Silver	Omar Espinoza; Salvador Espinoza	Basque pelota	Men's doubles frontenis	August 10
Silver	Stephanie Roble; Maggie Shea	Sailing	49erFX	August 10
Silver	Nicholas Sweetser	Swimming	Men's 1500 meter freestyle	August 10
Silver	Meghan Small	Swimming	Women's 200 meter individual medley	August 10
Silver	Khatuna Lorig	Archery	Women's individual recurve	August 11
Silver	L.A. Smith	Judo	Men's −100 kg	August 11
Bronze	Olivia Blatchford; Andrew Douglas	Squash	Mixed doubles	July 27
Bronze	David Kim	Taekwondo	Men's −58 kg	July 27
Bronze	Monique Rodriguez	Taekwondo	Women's −49 kg	July 27
Bronze	Karyn Real	Taekwondo	Women's poomsae individual	July 27
Bronze	United States men's national rugby sevens team: Ben Broselle; Maceo Brown; Travion Clark; Naima Faula'au; Jake Lachina; Cody Melphy; Montae Noble; Joe Schroeder; Lorenzo Thomas; Marcus Tupuola; Anthony Welmers; Harley Wheeler	Rugby sevens	Men's tournament	July 28
Bronze	Virginia Thrasher	Shooting	Women's 50 meter rifle three position	July 28
Bronze	Harrison Maurus	Weightlifting	Men's −81 kg	July 28
Bronze	Madelynn Gorman-Shore	Taekwondo	Women's +67 kg	July 29
Bronze	Adam Pickos	Water skiing	Men's tricks	July 29
Bronze	Katherine Nye	Weightlifting	Women's −76 kg	July 29
Bronze	Jakob Butturff	Bowling	Men's singles	July 30
Bronze	Delante Johnson	Boxing	Men's −69 kg	July 30
Bronze	Troy Isley	Boxing	Men's −75 kg	July 30
Bronze	Richard Torrez	Boxing	Men's +91 kg	July 30
Bronze	Yarisel Ramirez	Boxing	Women's −57 kg	July 30
Bronze	Rashida Ellis	Boxing	Women's −60 kg	July 30
Bronze	Anita Alvarez; Ruby Remati	Artistic swimming	Duet	July 31
Bronze	Anita Alvarez; Paige Areizaga; Nicole Goot; Hannah Heffernan; Daniella Ramirez; Ruby Remati; Abby Remmers; Lindi Schroeder; Emmanuella Tchakmakjian	Artistic swimming	Team	July 31
Bronze	Cameron Bock	Gymnastics	Parallel bars	July 31
Bronze	Riley McCusker	Gymnastics	Balance beam	July 31
Bronze	Jennifer Baumert	Equestrian	Individual dressage	July 31
Bronze	Iris Wang	Badminton	Women's singles	August 1
Bronze	Paula Obañana; Howard Shu	Badminton	Mixed doubles	August 1
Bronze	Andrew Capobianco	Diving	Men's 1 meter springboard	August 1
Bronze	Dania Vizzi	Shooting	Women's skeet	August 2
Bronze	Andrew Capobianco; Michael Hixon	Diving	Men's synchronized 3 meter springboard	August 3
Bronze	United States men's national basketball team: Ty-Shon Alexander; Myles Cale; Alpha Diallo; David Duke Jr.; Collin Gillespie; Geoffrey Groselle; Mustapha Heron; Myles Powell; Andre Reeves; Jermaine Samuels; Junathaen Watson; Tyler Wideman	Basketball	Men's tournament	August 4
Bronze	Michaela Corcoran	Canoeing	Women's slalom C-1	August 4
Bronze	Amy Magaña; Delaney Schnell	Diving	Women's synchronized 10 meter platform	August 4
Bronze	Camilla Feeley	Gymnastics	Ball	August 4
Bronze	Camilla Feeley	Gymnastics	Hoop	August 4
Bronze	Daniel Hughes	Surfing	Men's standup paddleboard	August 4
Bronze	Cole Robbins	Surfing	Men's longboard	August 4
Bronze	Brooke Schultz	Diving	Women's 3 meter springboard	August 5
Bronze	Evita Griskenas	Gymnastics	Ribbon	August 5
Bronze	Ruben Padilla	Gymnastics	Men's trampoline	August 5
Bronze	Kanak Jha; Jennifer Wu	Table tennis	Mixed doubles	August 5
Bronze	Reggie Jagers	Athletics	Men's discus throw	August 6
Bronze	Race Imboden	Fencing	Men's individual foil	August 6
Bronze	Rocky Carson; Charlie Pratt	Racquetball	Men's doubles	August 6
Bronze	Kelani Lawrence; Rhonda Rajsich	Racquetball	Women's doubles	August 6
Bronze	Kevin Cordes	Swimming	Men's 100 meter breastroke	August 6
Bronze	Meghan Small	Swimming	Women's 200 meter butterfly	August 6
Bronze	Lucy Deslauriers; Alex Granato; Eve Jobs; Beezie Madden	Equestrian	Team jumping	August 7
Bronze	Drew Kibler	Swimming	Men's 200 meter freestyle	August 7
Bronze	Sarah Gibson	Swimming	Women's 100 meter butterfly	August 7
Bronze	Kanak Jha	Table tennis	Men's singles	August 7
Bronze	Ildar Hafizov	Wrestling	Greco-Roman 60 kg	August 7
Bronze	Ellis Coleman	Wrestling	Greco-Roman 67 kg	August 7
Bronze	Justin Robinson	Athletics	Men's 400 meters	August 8
Bronze	Sean Donnelly	Athletics	Men's hammer throw	August 8
Bronze	Courtney Okolo	Athletics	Women's long jump	August 8
Bronze	Adonis Diaz	Judo	Men's −60 kg	August 8
Bronze	Michael Chadwick	Swimming	Men's 100 meter freestyle	August 8
Bronze	Lawi Lalang	Athletics	Men's 10,000 meters	August 9
Bronze	Jarret Eaton; Cravon Gillespie; Bryce Robinson; Mike Rodgers	Athletics	Men's 4 × 100 meter relay	August 9
Bronze	Alexa Efraimson	Athletics	Women's 1500 meters	August 9
Bronze	Kim Conley	Athletics	Women's 5000 meters	August 9
Bronze	Chanel Brissett; Shania Collins; Lynna Irby; Twanisha Terry	Athletics	Women's 4 × 100 meter relay	August 9
Bronze	Jessica Ramsey	Athletics	Women's shot put	August 9
Bronze	Ariana Ince	Athletics	Women's javelin throw	August 9
Bronze	Beezie Madden	Equestrian	Individual jumping	August 9
Bronze	United States women's national field hockey team: Mackenzie Allessie; Kelsey Bing; Anna Dessoye; Alexandra Froede; Linnea Gonzales; Danielle Grega; Ashley Hoffman; Amanda Magadan; Alyssa Manley; Erin Matson; Lauren Moyer; Margaux Paolino; Alyssa Parker; Kealsie Robles; Kathleen Sharkey; Casey Umstead; Caitlin Van Sickle; Julia Young	Field hockey	Women's tournament	August 9
Bronze	Nick Delpopolo	Judo	Men's −73 kg	August 9
Bronze	Jacob Bredenbeck; Rocky Carson; Charlie Pratt	Racquetball	Men's team	August 9
Bronze	Kelani Lawrence; Rhonda Rajsich	Racquetball	Women's team	August 9
Bronze	Charlie Buckingham	Sailing	Laser	August 9
Bronze	Michael Chadwick	Swimming	Men's 50 meter freestyle	August 9
Bronze	Madison Kennedy	Swimming	Women's 50 meter freestyle	August 9
Bronze	Jaydin Eierman	Wrestling	Men's freestyle 65 kg	August 9
Bronze	Paige Pearce	Archery	Women's individual compound	August 10
Bronze	Clayton Fritsch	Athletics	Men's pole vault	August 10
Bronze	United States men's national field hockey team: Michael Barminski; Thomas Barratt; Sean Cicchi; Christian De Angelis; Ajai Dhadwal; Mohan Ghandi; Patrick Harris; Deegan Huisman; Hans Aki Kaeppeler; Hans Kei Kaeppeler; Jonathan Klages; Adam Miller; Alberto Montilla; Jonathan Orozco; Parmeet Singh; Tyler Sundeen	Field hockey	Men's tournament	August 10
Bronze	Hannah Martin	Judo	Women's −70 kg	August 10
Bronze	Kelsey Helman	Roller sports	Women's 10,000 meter elimination	August 10
Bronze	Maggie Fellows; Julia Lonchar; Sydney Taylor; Keara Twist	Rowing	Women's quadruple sculls	August 10
Bronze	Will Cyr	Sailing	Kites	August 10
Bronze	Rebecca Mann	Swimming	Women's 1500 meter freestyle	August 10
Bronze	Amy Wang; Jennifer Wu; Lily Zhang	Table tennis	Women's team	August 10
Bronze	Pat Downey	Wrestling	Men's freestyle 86 kg	August 10
Bronze	Brady Ellison; Thomas Stanwood; Jack Williams	Archery	Men's team recurve	August 11
Bronze	Casey Kaufhold	Archery	Women's individual recurve	August 11
Bronze	Justin Dowell	Cycling	Men's BMX freestyle	August 11
Bronze	Cirrus Lingl	Karate	Women's +68 kg	August 11

Medals by sport
**Sport**	1st place, gold medalist(s)	2nd place, silver medalist(s)	3rd place, bronze medalist(s)	Total
Swimming	21	16	8	45
Shooting	10	8	2	20
Fencing	10	0	1	11
Wrestling	9	2	4	15
Gymnastics	8	11	6	25
Athletics	7	14	12	33
Cycling	7	1	1	9
Water skiing	5	2	1	8
Squash	5	1	1	7
Karate	5	1	1	7
Taekwondo	4	1	4	9
Equestrian	3	2	3	8
Canoeing	3	2	1	6
Bowling	3	0	1	4
Sailing	2	3	2	7
Archery	2	2	3	7
Modern pentathlon	2	2	0	4
Weightlifting	2	1	2	5
Basketball	2	1	1	4
Golf	2	0	0	2
Water polo	2	0	0	2
Boxing	2	3	5	10
Diving	1	2	4	7
Table tennis	1	2	3	6
Surfing	1	1	2	4
Softball	1	1	0	2
Tennis	1	1	0	2
Beach volleyball	1	0	0	1
Badminton	0	2	2	4
Judo	0	1	3	4
Roller sports	0	1	1	2
Rowing	0	1	1	2
Rugby sevens	0	1	1	2
Basque pelota	0	1	0	1
Racquetball	0	0	4	4
Artistic swimming	0	0	2	2
Field hockey	0	0	2	2
Total	122	87	84	293

Medals by day
**Day**	**Date**	1st place, gold medalist(s)	2nd place, silver medalist(s)	3rd place, bronze medalist(s)	Total
1	July 27	5	4	4	13
2	July 28	5	3	3	11
3	July 29	10	9	3	22
4	July 30	9	5	6	20
5	July 31	5	2	5	12
6	August 1	3	3	3	9
7	August 2	6	7	1	14
8	August 3	6	3	2	11
9	August 4	7	7	6	20
10	August 5	3	2	4	9
11	August 6	5	5	6	16
12	August 7	11	6	6	23
13	August 8	9	12	5	26
14	August 9	11	7	16	34
15	August 10	21	10	10	41
16	August 11	6	2	4	12
Total		122	87	84	293

Medals by gender
**Gender**	1st place, gold medalist(s)	2nd place, silver medalist(s)	3rd place, bronze medalist(s)	**Total**	**Percentage**
Female	68	47	40	**155**	52.9%
Male	45	37	40	**122**	41.6%
Mixed	9	3	4	**16**	5.5%
Total	122	87	84	293	100%

Multiple medalists
**Name**	**Sport**	1st place, gold medalist(s)	2nd place, silver medalist(s)	3rd place, bronze medalist(s)	Total
Margo Geer	Swimming	4	1	0	5
Evita Griskenas	Gymnastics	4	0	1	5
Nathan Adrian	Swimming	2	3	0	5
Michael Chadwick	Swimming	2	1	2	5
Claire Rasmus	Swimming	4	0	0	4
Riley McCusker	Gymnastics	2	1	1	4
Camilla Feeley	Gymnastics	1	1	2	4
Amanda Sobhy	Squash	3	0	0	3
Andrew Abruzzo	Swimming	3	0	0	3
Daniel Carr	Swimming	3	0	0	3
Anne Lazor	Swimming	3	0	0	3
Alex Walsh	Swimming	3	0	0	3
Regina Jaquess	Water skiing	3	0	0	3
Kara Eaker	Gymnastics	2	1	0	3
Meaghan Raab	Swimming	2	1	0	3
Casey Kaufhold	Archery	2	0	1	3
Sarah Gibson	Swimming	2	0	1	3
Olivia Blatchford	Squash	1	1	1	3
Kanak Jha	Table tennis	1	0	2	3
Brooke Schultz	Diving	0	2	1	3
Drew Kibler	Swimming	0	2	1	3
Jennifer Wu	Table tennis	0	1	2	3
Nick Pate	Bowling	2	0	0	2
Christina Birch	Cycling	2	0	0	2
Kimberly Geist	Cycling	2	0	0	2
Chloé Owen	Cycling	2	0	0	2
Boyd Martin	Equestrian	2	0	0	2
Katherine Holmes	Fencing	2	0	0	2
Daryl Homer	Fencing	2	0	0	2
Lee Kiefer	Fencing	2	0	0	2
Gerek Meinhardt	Fencing	2	0	0	2
Anne-Elizabeth Stone	Fencing	2	0	0	2
Emilia Migliaccio	Golf	2	0	0	2
Ashley Carroll	Shooting	2	0	0	2
Chris Hanson	Squash	2	0	0	2
Todd Harrity	Squash	2	0	0	2
Sabrina Sobhy	Squash	2	0	0	2
Phoebe Bacon	Swimming	2	0	0	2
Will Licon	Swimming	2	0	0	2
Lia Neal	Swimming	2	0	0	2
Tom Shields	Swimming	2	0	0	2
Kendyl Stewart	Swimming	2	0	0	2
Charles Swanson	Swimming	2	0	0	2
Alex Lee	Taekwondo	2	0	0	2
Khatuna Lorig	Archery	1	1	0	2
Anna Cockrell	Athletics	1	1	0	2
Evy Leibfarth	Canoeing	1	1	0	2
Adrian Hegyvary	Cycling	1	1	0	2
Gavin Hoover	Cycling	1	1	0	2
Sarah Bacon	Diving	1	1	0	2
Sarah Lockman	Equestrian	1	1	0	2
Lynn Symansky	Equestrian	1	1	0	2
Leanne Wong	Gymnastics	1	1	0	2
Samantha Achterberg	Modern pentathlon	1	1	0	2
Amro El Geziry	Modern pentathlon	1	1	0	2
Brian Burrows	Shooting	1	1	0	2
Derek Haldeman	Shooting	1	1	0	2
Lucas Kozeneisky	Shooting	1	1	0	2
Nick Alexander	Swimming	1	1	0	2
Nic Fink	Swimming	1	1	0	2
Isabelle Stadden	Swimming	1	1	0	2
Caroline Dolehide	Tennis	1	1	0	2
Brady Ellison	Archery	1	0	1	2
Lynna Irby	Athletics	1	0	1	2
Courtney Okolo	Athletics	1	0	1	2
Mike Rodgers	Athletics	1	0	1	2
Jakob Butturff	Bowling	1	0	1	2
Race Imboden	Fencing	1	0	1	2
Andrew Douglas	Squash	1	0	1	2
Madison Kennedy	Swimming	1	0	1	2
Karyn Real	Taekwondo	1	0	1	2
Isabelle Connor	Gymnastics	0	2	0	2
Yelyzaveta Merenzon	Gymnastics	0	2	0	2
Robert Neff	Gymnastics	0	2	0	2
Elizaveta Pletneva	Gymnastics	0	2	0	2
Nicole Slakov	Gymnastics	0	2	0	2
Kristina Sobelevskaya	Gymnastics	0	2	0	2
Minden Miles	Shooting	0	2	0	2
Nick Mowrer	Shooting	0	2	0	2
Rachel Tozier	Shooting	0	2	0	2
Grant House	Swimming	0	2	0	2
Sam Pomajevich	Swimming	0	2	0	2
Chanel Brissett	Athletics	0	1	1	2
Justin Robinson	Athletics	0	1	1	2
Jennifer Baumert	Equestrian	0	1	1	2
Cameron Bock	Gymnastics	0	1	1	2
Maggie Fellows	Rowing	0	1	1	2
Julia Lonchar	Rowing	0	1	1	2
Meghan Small	Swimming	0	1	1	2
Amy Wang	Table tennis	0	1	1	2
Lily Zhang	Table tennis	0	1	1	2
Anita Alvarez	Artistic swimming	0	0	2	2
Ruby Remati	Artistic swimming	0	0	2	2
Andrew Capobianco	Diving	0	0	2	2
Beezie Madden	Equestrian	0	0	2	2
Rocky Carson	Racquetball	0	0	2	2
Kelani Lawrence	Racquetball	0	0	2	2
Charlie Pratt	Racquetball	0	0	2	2
Rhonda Rajsich	Racquetball	0	0	2	2

* – Indicates that the athlete competed in preliminaries but not the final.

== Competitors ==
The following is the list of number of competitors (per gender) participating at the games per sport/discipline.

Sport	Men	Women	Total
Archery	4	4	8
Artistic swimming	—N/a	9	9
Athletics	45	45	90
Badminton	4	4	8
Basketball	16	16	32
Basque pelota	5	0	5
Bowling	2	2	4
Boxing	6	5	11
Canoeing	9	8	17
Cycling	9	7	16
Diving	4	4	8
Equestrian	4	8	12
Fencing	9	9	18
Field hockey	16	16	32
Golf	2	2	4
Gymnastics	7	17	24
Handball	14	14	28
Judo	6	7	13
Karate	4	5	9
Modern pentathlon	2	3	5
Racquetball	3	2	5
Roller sports	3	2	5
Rowing	13	7	20
Rugby sevens	12	12	24
Sailing	10	7	17
Shooting	11	11	22
Softball	15	15	30
Squash	3	3	6
Swimming	20	20	40
Surfing	3	4	7
Table tennis	3	3	6
Taekwondo	7	6	13
Tennis	3	3	6
Triathlon	3	3	6
Volleyball	14	14	28
Water polo	11	11	22
Water skiing	3	3	6
Weightlifting	4	6	10
Wrestling	12	6	18
Total	311	325	636

== Archery ==
The United States qualified a full team of eight archers through the 2018 Pan American Archery Championships.

Men

Athlete	Event	Ranking round		Round of 32	Round of 16	Quarterfinal	Semifinal	Final / BM	
Athlete	Event	Score	Rank	Opposition Result	Opposition Result	Opposition Result	Opposition Result	Opposition Result	Rank
Brady Ellison	Individual recurve	702 WR	1	Sabado (ARG); W 6–0	Stevens (CUB); W 7–1	Peters (CAN); L 0–6	did not advance		
Thomas Stanwood	Individual recurve	666	8	Boardman (MEX); L 4–6	did not advance				
Jack Williams	Individual recurve	689	3	Painevil (CHI); W 6–2	Jajarabilla (ARG); W 7–3	Oliveira (BRA); L 5–6	did not advance		
Braden Gellenthien	Individual compound	712 PR	1	—N/a	Bye	Cid (GUA); W 149–146	Muñoz (COL); W 147–144	Hernández (ESA); L 146–147	2nd place, silver medalist(s)
Brady Ellison; Thomas Stanwood; Jack Williams	Team recurve	2057 PR	1	—N/a		Guatemala; W 6–0	Canada; L 1–5	Bronze medal final Mexico; W 5–3	3rd place, bronze medalist(s)

Women

Athlete	Event	Ranking round		Round of 32	Round of 16	Quarterfinal	Semifinal	Final / BM	
Athlete	Event	Score	Rank	Opposition Result	Opposition Result	Opposition Result	Opposition Result	Opposition Result	Rank
Casey Kaufhold	Individual recurve	662	2	Claros (BOL); W 6–0	Caetano (BRA); W 6–2	Pellecer (GUA); W 6–0	Lorig (USA); L 4–6	Bronze medal final Rendón (COL); W 6–0	3rd place, bronze medalist(s)
Khatuna Lorig	Individual recurve	642	6	Fals (CUB); W 6–0	Leithold (ARG); W 6–0	Román (MEX); W 6–4	Kaufhold (USA); W 6–4	Valencia (MEX); L 3–7	2nd place, silver medalist(s)
Erin Mickelberry	Individual recurve	636	8	Fernandez (BOL); W 6–0	Márquez (CHI); W 6–0	Valencia (MEX); L 5–5	did not advance		
Paige Pearce	Individual compound	695	4	—N/a	Bye	Lameg (CAN); W 147–144	López (COL); L 142–149	Bronze medal final Gonzalez (ARG); W 149–143	3rd place, bronze medalist(s)
Casey Kaufhold; Khatuna Lorig; Erin Mickelberry	Team recurve	1940	2	—N/a		Chile; W 6–0	Colombia; W 6–2	Mexico; W 5–3	1st place, gold medalist(s)

Mixed

Athlete	Event	Ranking round		Round of 16	Quarterfinal	Semifinal	Final / BM	
Athlete	Event	Score	Rank	Opposition Result	Opposition Result	Opposition Result	Opposition Result	Rank
Brady Ellison; Casey Kaufhold	Team recurve	1364 PR	1	Bye	Aguilar / Bassi (CHI); W 6–0	Barrett / Duenas (CAN); W 6–2	Pineda / Rendón (COL); W 5–3	1st place, gold medalist(s)
Braden Gellenthien; Paige Pearce	Team compound	1407	2	—N/a	Cid / Zebadua (GUA); L 155–156	did not advance		

== Artistic swimming ==
The United States qualified a team of nine athletes automatically, as being the only member as part of zone three.

Athlete	Event	Technical swim		Free swim		Total	
Athlete	Event	Score	Rank	Score	Rank	Score	Rank
Anita Alvarez; Ruby Remati	Duet	84.7365	3	85.9333	3	170.6698	3rd place, bronze medalist(s)
Anita Alvarez; Paige Areizaga; Nicole Goot; Hannah Heffernan; Daniella Ramirez; Ruby Remati; Abby Remmers; Lindi Schroeder; Emmanuella Tchakmakjian	Team	84.1447	3	86.6667	3	170.8114	3rd place, bronze medalist(s)

== Athletics ==
The United States has qualified 90 athletes for the games.

There was considerable controversy in selecting the 2019 U.S. Pan American Games track and field team. USA Track and Field selection documents stated that athletes would be chosen based on top performances from 2019 only, but their initially announced team was selected by performances from both 2018 and 2019. USATF was sued by LetsRun.com and a selection of athletes who would have been on the team if not for the change of course. On 19 July, USA Track and Field was ordered by a U.S. court to re-select the team based on the 2019 comprehensive list.

Men

Track & road events

Athlete	Event	Semifinal		Final	
Athlete	Event	Time	Rank	Time	Rank
Cravon Gillespie	100 m	10.32	2 Q	10.38	6
Mike Rodgers	100 m	10.29	2 Q	10.09	1st place, gold medalist(s)
Andrew Hudson	200 m	42.96	6	did not advance	
Wil London	400 m	45.78	4 q	45.22	4
Justin Robinson	400 m	45.38	2 Q	45.07	3rd place, bronze medalist(s)
Bryce Hoppel	800 m	1:48.04	1 Q	1:47.48	4
Johnny Gregorek	1500 m	—N/a		3:40.42	2nd place, silver medalist(s)
Tyler Day	5000 m	—N/a		14:01.13	10
Josef Tessema	5000 m	—N/a		14:00.19	8
Reid Buchanan	10,000 m	—N/a		28:28.41	2nd place, silver medalist(s)
Lawi Lalang	10,000 m	—N/a		28:31.75	3rd place, bronze medalist(s)
Freddie Crittenden	110 m hurdles	13.53	1 Q	13.32	2nd place, silver medalist(s)
Jarret Eaton	110 m hurdles	13.71	3 Q	DNF	
Norman Grimes	400 m hurdles	50.04	4 q	49.65	6
Amere Lattin	400 m hurdles	49.75	1 Q	48.98	2nd place, silver medalist(s)
Benard Keter	3000 m steeplechase	—N/a		8:32.76	4
Travis Mahoney	3000 m steeplechase	—N/a		8:34.77	5
Jarret Eaton; Cravon Gillespie; Bryce Robinson; Mike Rodgers	4 × 100 m relay	—N/a		38.79	3rd place, bronze medalist(s)
Mar'Yea Harris; Wil London; Michael Cherry; Justin Robinson	4 × 400 m relay	—N/a		3:01.72	2nd place, silver medalist(s)
Aaron Braun	Marathon	—N/a		2:21:55	14
Augustus Maiyo	Marathon	—N/a		2:12:25	4
Nick Christie	50 km walk	—N/a		DNF	
Matthew Forgues	50 km walk	—N/a		4:19:28	5

Field events

Athlete	Event	Result	Rank
Trumaine Jefferson	Long jump	7.66	6
Chris Carter	Triple jump	16.29	6
Omar Craddock	Triple jump	17.42	1st place, gold medalist(s)
Keenon Laine	High jump	2.24	5
Jeron Robinson	High jump	2.21	6
Clayton Fritsch	Pole vault	5.61	3rd place, bronze medalist(s)
Chris Nilsen	Pole vault	5.76	1st place, gold medalist(s)
Olayinka Awotunde	Shot put	19.04	9
Jordan Geist	Shot put	20.67	2nd place, silver medalist(s)
Reggie Jagers	Discus throw	64.48	3rd place, bronze medalist(s)
Brian Williams II	Discus throw	NM	
Michael Shuey	Javelin throw	80.72	4
Curtis Thompson	Javelin throw	65.39	10
Sean Donnelly	Hammer throw	74.23	3rd place, bronze medalist(s)
Rudy Winkler	Hammer throw	71.84	8

Combined events – Decathlon

Athlete	Event	100 m	LJ	SP	HJ	400 m	110H	DT	PV	JT	1500 m	Total	Rank
Nathan Hite	Result	10.96	6.85	13.72	1.85	48.74	15.04	39.47	4.50	51.64	4:50.81	7389	9
Nathan Hite	Points	870	778	711	670	874	845	654	760	613	614	7389	9

Women

Track & road events

Athlete	Event	Semifinal		Final	
Athlete	Event	Time	Rank	Time	Rank
Twanisha Terry	100 m	11.59	3 q	11.37	5
Lynna Irby	200 m	23.93	6	did not advance	
Courtney Okolo	400 m	52.31	2 Q	51.22	3rd place, bronze medalist(s)
Jaide Stepter	400 m	52.17	3 Q	DQ	
Athing Mu	800 m	2:07.30	7	did not advance	
Alexa Efraimson	1500 m	—N/a		4:08.36	3rd place, bronze medalist(s)
Nikki Hiltz	1500 m	—N/a		4:07.14	1st place, gold medalist(s)
Kim Conley	5000 m	—N/a		15:36.95	3rd place, bronze medalist(s)
Lauran Paquette	5000 m	—N/a		15:45.93	6
Sarah Pagano	10,000 m	—N/a		32:48.04	6
Elaina Tabb	10,000 m	—N/a		32:24.27	4
Chanel Brissett	100 m hurdles	13.08	4 q	12.99	2nd place, silver medalist(s)
Sharika Nelvis	100 m hurdles	12.85	2 Q	13.23	7
Anna Cockrell	400 m hurdles	56.04	3 Q	55.50	2nd place, silver medalist(s)
Marisa Howard	3000 m steeplechase	—N/a		9:43.78	2nd place, silver medalist(s)
Allie Ostrander	3000 m steeplechase	—N/a		DNS	
Chanel Brissett; Shania Collins; Lynna Irby; Twanisha Terry	4 × 100 m relay	—N/a		43.39	3rd place, bronze medalist(s)
Anna Cockrell; Lynna Irby; Courtney Okolo; Jaide Stepter	4 × 400 m relay	—N/a		3:26.46	1st place, gold medalist(s)
Samantha Roecker	Marathon	—N/a		2:32:49	5
Bethany Sachtleben	Marathon	—N/a		2:31:20	2nd place, silver medalist(s)
Miranda Melville	20 km walk	—N/a		DQ	
Robyn Stevens	20 km walk	—N/a		1:40:29	12
Katie Burnett	50 km walk	—N/a		DNF	
Stephanie Casey	50 km walk	—N/a		4:50:31	9

Field events

Athlete	Event	Result	Rank
Keturah Orji	Long jump	6.66	2nd place, silver medalist(s)
Aliyah Whisby	Long jump	6.36	8
Bria Matthews	Triple jump	12.13	14
Kelly McKee	Triple jump	12.68	13
Nicole Greene	High jump	1.79	8
Morgan Smalls	High jump	1.74	10
Olivia Gruver	Pole vault	4.55	4
Kathryn Nageotte	Pole vault	4.70	2nd place, silver medalist(s)
Daniella Hill	Shot put	18.06	4
Jessica Ramsey	Shot put	19.01	3rd place, bronze medalist(s)
Whitney Ashley	Discus throw	60.27	5
Kelsey Card	Discus throw	58.94	8
Ariana Ince	Javelin throw	62.32	3rd place, bronze medalist(s)
Kara Winger	Javelin throw	64.92	1st place, gold medalist(s)
Brooke Andersen	Hammer throw	71.07	2nd place, silver medalist(s)
Gwen Berry	Hammer throw	74.62	1st place, gold medalist(s)

Combined events – Heptathlon

Athlete	Event	100H	HJ	SP	200 m	LJ	JT	800 m	Total	Rank
Annie Kunz	Result	13.55	1.74	13.06	24.47	6.11	39.95	2:19.69	5990	2nd place, silver medalist(s)
Annie Kunz	Points	1043	903	731	936	883	666	828	5990	2nd place, silver medalist(s)
Riley Schultz-Cooks	Result	13.77	1.59	12.97	24.76	5.74	39.89	2:28.55	5516	7
Riley Schultz-Cooks	Points	1011	724	725	909	771	665	711	5516	7

== Badminton ==
The United States qualified a full team of eight badminton athletes.

Athlete	Event	Round of 64	Round of 32	Round of 16	Quarterfinal	Semifinal	Final / BM	
Athlete	Event	Opposition Result	Opposition Result	Opposition Result	Opposition Result	Opposition Result	Opposition Result	Rank
Timothy Lam	Men's singles	Bye	Barrios (VEN); W 21–10, 21–9	Castellanos (GUA); W 21–9, 21–17	Coelho (BRA); L 16–21, 6–21	did not advance		
Howard Shu	Men's singles	Bye	Yang (CAN); L 21–18, 11–21, 6–21	did not advance				
Phillip Chew; Ryan Chew	Men's doubles	—N/a		Bye	López / Montoya (MEX); W 21–16, 21–17	Fa. Farias / Fr. Farias (BRA); W 20–22, 21–13, 21–17	Ho-Shue / Yakura (CAN); L 11–21, 21–19, 18–21	2nd place, silver medalist(s)
Iris Wang	Women's singles	Bye	Centeno (ESA); W 21–8, 21–8	Wynter (JAM); W 21–4, 21–6	Macías (PER); W 21–10, 21–12	Li (CAN); L 10–21, 5–21	Did not advance	3rd place, bronze medalist(s)
Kuei-Ya Chen; Jamie Hsu	Women's doubles	—N/a		Gaitán / Valero (MEX); W 21–18, 21–16	Oropesa / Ortíz (CUB); W 21–16, 21–15	J Lima / S Lima (BRA); W 17–21, 21–12, 21–18	Honderich / Tsai (CAN); L 10–21, 9–21	2nd place, silver medalist(s)
Ryan Chew; Kuei-Ya Chen	Mixed doubles	—N/a	Cuba / Macías (PER); W 21–17, 21–17	Muñoz / Gaitán (MEX); L 21–19, 18–21, 22–24	did not advance			
Howard Shu; Paula Obañana	Mixed doubles	—N/a	Bye	León / Montre (CHI); W 17–21, 21–14, 21–11	Mini / Nishimura (PER); W 20–22, 21–12, 21–16	Yakura/ Tsai (CAN); L 15–21, 15–21	Did not advance	3rd place, bronze medalist(s)

== Basketball ==
=== 5x5 ===
Summary

Team	Event	Preliminary round				Semifinal	Final / BM / Pl.	
Team	Event	Opposition Result	Opposition Result	Opposition Result	Rank	Opposition Result	Opposition Result	Rank
United States men	Men's tournament	Virgin Islands; W 119–84	Venezuela; W 70–53	Puerto Rico; L 84–87	2 Q	Argentina; L 75–114	Bronze medal game Dominican Republic; W 92–83	3rd place, bronze medalist(s)
United States women	Women's tournament	Argentina; W 70–62	Virgin Islands; W 103–55	Colombia; W 75–63	1 Q	Puerto Rico; W 62–59	Brazil; L 73–79	2nd place, silver medalist(s)

==== Men's tournament ====
Preliminary round

Team	Pld	W	L	PF	PA	PD	Pts	Qualification
Puerto Rico	3	3	0	261	237	+24	6	Qualified for the Semifinals
United States	3	2	1	273	224	+49	5	Qualified for the Semifinals
Venezuela	3	1	2	204	227	−23	4	
Virgin Islands	3	0	3	257	307	−50	3	

31 July 2019
10:30

Report

United States	119–84	Virgin Islands
Scoring by quarter: 39–23, 17–20, 35–19, 28–22
Pts: Diallo 20; Rebs: Diallo 11; Asts: Gillespie 3		Pts: Hodge 18; Rebs: Aska 8 Asts: Milligan 8

Coliseo Eduardo Dibos, Lima
Referees: Michael Weiland (CAN)

1 August 2019
21:00

Report

Venezuela	53–70	United States
Scoring by quarter: 13–20, 16–14, 8–16, 16–20
Pts: Colmenares 16; Rebs: Vargas 9 Asts: Colmenares, Vargas 2		Pts: Powell 30; Rebs: Gillespie 7 Asts: Diallo 3

Coliseo Eduardo Dibos, Lima
Referees: Cristiano Maranho (BRA)

2 August 2019
21:00

Report

Puerto Rico	87–84	United States
Scoring by quarter: 27–38, 19–19, 18–15, 23–12
Pts: Collier 23; Rebs: Collier 10; Asts: Gandía 4		Pts: Samuels 17; Rebs: Cale 5 Asts: Gillespie, Powell 2

Coliseo Eduardo Dibos, Lima
Referees: Cristiano Maranho (BRA)

Semifinal

3 August 2019
21:00

Report

Argentina	114–75	United States
Scoring by quarter: 29–18, 32–18, 30–20, 23–19
Pts: Deck 23; Rebs: Brussino 8 Asts: Campazzo 5		Pts: Duke 16; Rebs: Reeves 6 Asts: Gillespie 5

Coliseo Eduardo Dibos, Lima
Referees: Cristiano Maranho (BRA)

Bronze medal game

4 August 2019
18:00

Report

Dominican Republic	83–92	United States
Scoring by quarter: 20–20, 18–16, 27–24, 18–32
Pts: Solano 26; Rebs: Montero 9 Asts: De León 4		Pts: Diallo 23; Rebs: Groselle 10; Asts: Diallo 3

Coliseo Eduardo Dibos, Lima
Referees: Leandro Lezcano (ARG)

==== Women's tournament ====
Preliminary round

Team	Pld	W	L	PF	PA	PD	Pts	Qualification
United States	3	3	0	248	180	+68	6	Qualified for the Semifinals
Colombia	3	2	1	152	141	+11	5	Qualified for the Semifinals
Argentina	3	1	2	135	149	−14	3 (Note: Argentina did not receive a point for the forfeit loss to Colombia.)	
Virgin Islands	3	0	3	180	245	−65	3	

Notes:

6 August 2019
21:00

Report

United States	70–62	Argentina
Scoring by quarter: 23–16, 10–18, 18–13, 19–15
Pts: Carter 14; Rebs: Onyenwere 12; Asts: Harris, Carter 2		Pts: Boquete, González 14; Rebs: Burani 8 Asts: Gretter 8

Coliseo Eduardo Dibos, Lima
Referees: Michael Weiland (CAN)

7 August 2019
18:00

Report

Virgin Islands	55–103	United States
Scoring by quarter: 10–34, 11–21, 13–23, 21–25
Pts: Day 20; Rebs: George 6 Asts: Day 3		Pts: Mikesell 16; Rebs: P. Williams, Onyenwere 6 Asts: K. Williams 6

Coliseo Eduardo Dibos, Lima
Referees: Andrés Bartel (URU)

8 August 2019
13:30

Report

United States	75–63	Colombia
Scoring by quarter: 24–13, 23–8, 12–18, 16–24
Pts: Mompremier 15; Rebs: Onyenwere 9 Asts: Harris, Pivec 3		Pts: Muñoz 11; Rebs: Mosquera 8 Asts: Ríos, Mosquera 2

Coliseo Eduardo Dibos, Lima
Attendance: Cristiano Maranho (BRA)

Semifinal

9 August 2019
21:00

Report

United States	62–59	Puerto Rico
Scoring by quarter: 18–21, 15–9, 17–16, 12–13
Pts: Carter, Mompremier 14; Rebs: Mompremier 12; Asts: K. Williams 4		Pts: O'Neill 19; Rebs: Meléndez 8 Asts: O'Neill, Rosado 3

Coliseo Eduardo Dibos, Lima
Referees: Leandro Lezcano (ARG)

Gold medal game

10 August 2019
21:00

Report

Brazil	79–73	United States
Scoring by quarter: 20–22, 19–16, 16–15, 24–20
Pts: Paixão 24; Rebs: Paixão 7 Asts: Paixão 3		Pts: Carter, Mompremier 16; Rebs: Mompremier 12; Asts: Harris 5

Coliseo Eduardo Dibos, Lima
Referees: Leandro Lezcano (ARG)

=== 3x3 ===
Summary

Team	Event	Preliminary round						Semifinal	Final / BM / Pl.	
Team	Event	Opposition Result	Opposition Result	Opposition Result	Opposition Result	Opposition Result	Rank	Opposition Result	Opposition Result	Rank
United States men	Men's tournament	Venezuela; W 21–14	Brazil; L 19–20	Puerto Rico; L 18–20	Argentina; L 20–22	Dominican Republic; W 21–13	3 Q	Brazil; W 21–12	Puerto Rico; W 21–19	1st place, gold medalist(s)
United States women	Women's tournament	Argentina; W 21–15	Uruguay; W 21–5	Brazil; W 21–7	Venezuela; W 18–14	Dominican Republic; W 21–7	1 Q	Brazil; W 21–5	Argentina; W 21–17	1st place, gold medalist(s)

==== Men's tournament ====
Preliminary round

Pos	Team	Pld	W	L	PF	PA	PD	Qualification
1	Puerto Rico	5	5	0	104	70	+34	Semifinals
2	Brazil	5	3	2	101	91	+10	Semifinals
3	United States	5	2	3	99	89	+10	Semifinals
4	Dominican Republic	5	2	3	81	98	−17	Semifinals
5	Venezuela	5	2	3	85	104	−19	Fifth place match
6	Argentina	5	1	4	86	104	−18	Fifth place match

Source: Report
Rules for classification: 1) Wins; 2) Head-to-head record; 3) Points scored.

27 July 2019
16:00

Report

United States	21–14	Venezuela
Pts: Jones 12		Pts: Carrera 7

Coliseo Eduardo Dibos
Referees: Ángel Martínez (PUR) / Gonzalo Paz (URU)

27 July 2019
20:00

Report

Brazil	20–19	United States
Pts: De Mello 9		Pts: Jones 7

Coliseo Eduardo Dibos
Referees: Sonia Maldonado (PUR) / Gonzalo Paz (URU)

28 July 2019
15:00

Report

Puerto Rico	20–18	United States
Pts: Matías 6		Pts: Octeus 8

Coliseo Eduardo Dibos
Referees: Kayla Herdman (CAN) / Gonzalo Paz (URU)

28 July 2019
18:00

Report

United States	20–22	Argentina
Pts: Jones 12		Pts: Romano 10

Coliseo Eduardo Dibos
Referees: Sonia Maldonado (PUR) / Ángel Martínez (PUR)

28 July 2019
21:30

Report

Dominican Republic	13–21	United States
Pts: Beato 7		Pts: Jones 8

Coliseo Eduardo Dibos
Referees: Kayla Herdman (CAN) / Ángel Martínez (PUR)

Semifinal

29 July 2019
10:30

Report

Brazil	12–21	United States
Pts: Froehlich 6		Pts: Octeus 8

Coliseo Eduardo Dibos
Referees: Ángel Martínez (PUR) / Gonzalo Paz (URU)

Gold medal game

29 July 2019
13:30

Report

Puerto Rico	19–21	United States
Pts: Matías 12		Pts: Octeus, Jeter 8

Coliseo Eduardo Dibos
Referees: Kayla Herdman (CAN) / Gonzalo Paz (URU)

==== Women's tournament ====
Preliminary round

Pos	Team	Pld	W	L	PF	PA	PD	Qualification
1	United States	5	5	0	102	48	+54	Semifinals
2	Argentina	5	4	1	76	68	+8	Semifinals
3	Dominican Republic	5	3	2	68	73	−5	Semifinals
4	Brazil	5	2	3	76	89	−13	Semifinals
5	Venezuela	5	1	4	72	80	−8	Fifth place match
6	Uruguay	5	0	5	55	91	−36	Fifth place match

Source: Lima 2019
Rules for classification: 1) Wins; 2) Head-to-head record; 3) Points scored.

27 July 2019
15:30

Report

United States	21–15	Argentina
Pts: Ionescu, Hebard 9		Pts: Llorente 8

Coliseo Eduardo Dibos
Referees: Kayla Herdman (CAN) / Gonzalo Paz (URU)

27 July 2019
18:00

Report

Uruguay	5–21	United States
Pts: Gayoso 5		Pts: Hebard 7

Coliseo Eduardo Dibos
Referees: Kayla Herdman (CAN) / Sonia Maldonado (PUR)

27 July 2019
21:00

Report

United States	21–7	Brazil
Pts: Hebard 10		Pts: Mineiro 3

Coliseo Eduardo Dibos
Referees: Ángel Martínez (PUR) / Gonzalo Paz (URU)

28 July 2019
17:00

Report

Venezuela	14–18	United States
Pts: Pérez 6		Pts: Hebard, Ionescu 7

Coliseo Eduardo Dibos
Referees: Gonzalo Paz (URU) / Carolina Zachi (BRA)

28 July 2019
19:00

Report

United States	21–7	Dominican Republic
Pts: Hebard, Willams 7		Pts: Monsac 5

Coliseo Eduardo Dibos
Referees: Carolina Zachi (BRA) / Sonia Maldonado (PUR)

Semifinal

29 July 2019
9:00

Report

United States	21–5	Brazil
Pts: Ionescu 9		Pts: Mariano 2

Coliseo Eduardo Dibos
Referees: Kayla Herdman (CAN) / Sonia Maldonado (CAN)

Gold medal game

29 July 2019
13:00

Report

United States	21–17	Argentina
Pts: Ionescu, Hebard 7		Pts: Boquete 5

Coliseo Eduardo Dibos
Referees: Ángel Martínez (PUR) / Carolina Zachi (BRA)

== Basque pelota ==
Men

Athlete	Event	Preliminary round					Semifinal	Final / BM	
Athlete	Event	Opposition Result	Opposition Result	Opposition Result	Opposition Result	Rank	Opposition Result	Opposition Result	Rank
Rolando Tejada	Rubber ball pelota singles	Ramirez (URU); L 4–15, 4–15	Vera (VEN); L 12–15, 15–10, 2–10	Rodriguez (MEX); L 3–15, 5–15	Blas (GUA); L 8–15, 12–15	5	did not advance		
Salvador Espinoza	Peruvian fronton singles	González (CUB); W 15–13, 15–9	Martínez (PER); L 7–15, 10–15	Perez (MEX); L 10–15, 15–14, 8–10	Osorio (ARG); L 9–15, 3–15	3 q	—N/a	Bronze medal final Perez (MEX); L 12–15, 15–11, 7–10	4
Agusti Brugues; Jose Huarte	Leather ball pelota doubles	Ledesma / Urrutia (MEX); L 7–15, 5–15	Fusto / Villegas (ARG); L 8–15, 2–15	Fernández / Velásquez (PER); W 15–4, 15–6	Chappi / Fernández (CUB); L 14–15, 7–15	4 q	—N/a	Bronze medal final Ledesma / Urrutia (MEX); L 11–15, 13–15	4
Omar Espinoza; Salvador Espinoza	Frontenis doubles	Lopez / Molina (MEX); L 13–15, 5–15	Bezada / Yupanqui (PER); W 15–5, 15–7	García / Gonzáles (CHI); W 15–7, 15–5	Alberdi / Osorio (ARG); W 15–10, 15–7	2 Q	—N/a	Lopez / Molina (MEX); L 8–15, 10–15	2nd place, silver medalist(s)

== Bowling ==
The United States qualified two women by finishing in the top two at the 2018 PABCON Female Championship.

Athlete	Event	Qualification / Final														Round robin											Semifinal	Final	
Athlete	Event	Block 1						Block 2						Total	Rank	Round robin											Semifinal	Final	
Athlete	Event	1	2	3	4	5	6	7	8	9	10	11	12	Total	Rank	1	2	3	4	5	6	7	8	Total	Grand total	Rank	Opposition Result	Opposition Result	Rank
Jakob Butturff	Men's singles	235	236	266	277	246	238	238	248	259	264	225	259	2991	1 Q	246	217	237	237	290	219	235	237	2058	5049	1 Q	Pate (USA); L 268–275	Did not advance	3rd place, bronze medalist(s)
Nick Pate	Men's singles	247	187	249	203	279	196	246	225	226	260	205	236	2759	6 Q	300	268	200	166	164	206	223	234	1821	4580	4 Q	Butturff (USA); W 275–268	Suartz (BRA); W 190–189	1st place, gold medalist(s)
Jakob Butturff; Nick Pate	Men's doubles	450	474	465	360	462	477	490	512	474	481	479	421	5545	1st place, gold medalist(s)	—N/a													
Stefanie Johnson	Women's singles	191	221	210	171	214	176	212	160	192	212	213	201	2373	18	did not advance													
Shannon O'Keefe	Women's singles	175	199	224	224	235	223	268	214	180	218	202	221	2583	5 Q	201	214	235	197	189	247	185	235	1763	4346	6	did not advance		
Stefanie Johnson; Shannon O'Keefe	Women's doubles	460	436	410	394	456	401	477	469	477	458	494	385	5317	1st place, gold medalist(s)	—N/a													

== Boxing ==
The United States qualified 11 boxers (six men and five women).

Men

Athlete	Event	Quarterfinal	Semifinal	Final	
Athlete	Event	Opposition Result	Opposition Result	Opposition Result	Rank
Duke Ragan	–56 kg	Farroñan (PER); W 5–0	Fernández (URU); W 5–0	Caballero (CUB); L 0–5	2nd place, silver medalist(s)
Bruce Carrington	–60 kg	De los Santos (DOM); L 0–5	did not advance		
Keyshawn Davis	–63 kg	Arcon (VEN); W WO	Alexander (TTO); W 5–0	Cruz (CUB); L 1–4	2nd place, silver medalist(s)
Delante Johnson	–69 kg	Rangel (COL); W 4–1	Iglesias (CUB); L 1–4	Did not advance	3rd place, bronze medalist(s)
Troy Isley	–75 kg	Vivas (COL); W 3–2	Conceic (BRA); L 1–4	Did not advance	3rd place, bronze medalist(s)
Richard Torrez	+91 kg	Muñoz (PER); W 5–0	Peró (CUB); L 2–3	Did not advance	3rd place, bronze medalist(s)

Women

Athlete	Event	Quarterfinal	Semifinal	Final	
Athlete	Event	Opposition Result	Opposition Result	Opposition Result	Rank
Virginia Fuchs	–51 kg	Cardenas (CRC); W 5–0	Cardozo (VEN); W 5–0	Valencia (COL); L 1–4	2nd place, silver medalist(s)
Yarisel Ramirez	–57 kg	Solorzano (ESA); W 5–0	Romeu (BRA); L 0–5	Did not advance	3rd place, bronze medalist(s)
Rashida Ellis	–60 kg	Rios (VEN); W 3–2	Ferreira (BRA); L 2–3	Did not advance	3rd place, bronze medalist(s)
Oshae Jones	–69 kg	Bylon (PAN); W 3–2	Moronta (DOM); W 4–1	Da Silva (CAN); W 5–0	1st place, gold medalist(s)
Naomi Graham	–75 kg	Salas (MEX); W RSC	Figueiredo (BRA); W 3–2	Caicedo (COL); W DSQ	(gold)

== Canoeing ==
=== Slalom ===
The United States qualified a total of four slalom athletes (two men and two women).

Athlete	Event	Preliminary round			Semifinal		Final	
Athlete	Event	Run 1	Run 2	Rank	Time	Rank	Time	Rank
Zachary Lokken	Men's C-1	89.82	87.23	3 Q	92.53	2 Q	90.66	1st place, gold medalist(s)
Josh Joseph	Men's K-1	80.55	81.43	2 Q	92.72	3 Q	88.53	4
Josh Joseph	Men's extreme K-1	—N/a		2 Q	—N/a	2 Q	—N/a	2nd place, silver medalist(s)
Michaela Corcoran	Women's C-1	101.77	96.75	2 Q	109.88	3 Q	107.73	3rd place, bronze medalist(s)
Evy Leibfarth	Women's K-1	85.88	86.13	1 Q	97.02	1 Q	93.70	1st place, gold medalist(s)
Evy Leibfarth	Women's extreme K-1	—N/a		1 Q	—N/a	2 Q	—N/a	2nd place, silver medalist(s)

=== Sprint ===
The United States qualified a total of 13 sprint athletes (seven men and six women).

Men

Athlete	Event	Heat		Semifinal		Final	
Athlete	Event	Time	Rank	Time	Rank	Time	Rank
Ian Ross	C-1 1000 m	4:31.018	3 SF	4:21.859	3 QF	4:16.371	7
Stanton Collins	K-1 200 m	37.313	3 QF	Bye		37.829	6
Jesse Lishchuk	K-1 1000 m	3:39.762	3 QF	Bye		3:45.645	6
Owen Farleylacik; Alexander Lee	K-2 1000 m	3:22.471	3 SF	3:27.619	1 QF	3:20.851	4
Stanton Collins; Carl Crocket; Nathaniel Errez; Owen Farleylacik	K-4 500 m	—N/a				1:25.011	5

Women

Athlete	Event	Heat		Semifinal		Final	
Athlete	Event	Time	Rank	Time	Rank	Time	Rank
Nevin Harrison	C-1 200 m	45.821	1 QF	Bye		46.649	1st place, gold medalist(s)
Elena Wolgamot	K-1 200 m	43.641	3 SF	42.431	3 QF	46.209	7
Elena Wolgamot	K-1 500 m	1:59.785	2 QF	Bye		1:58.409	4
Samantha Barlow; Kaitlyn McElroy	K-2 500 m	1:48.005	2 QF	Bye		1:53.059	4
Samantha Barlow; Renae Jackson; Kaitlyn McElroy; Alina Urs	K-4 500 m	—N/a				1:41.988	5

Qualification legend: QF – Qualify to final; SF – Qualify to semifinal

== Cycling ==
The United States has qualified 20 cyclists across all disciplines.

=== Road ===
Athlete	Event	Time	Rank
Chloé Owen	Women's time trial	23:36.51	1st place, gold medalist(s)

=== Track ===
Madison

Athlete	Event	Points	Rank
Adrian Hegyvary; Gavin Hoover	Men's	85	2nd place, silver medalist(s)
Christina Birch; Kimberly Geist	Women's	46	1st place, gold medalist(s)

Team pursuit

Athlete	Event	Qualifying		Elimination	Final / BM	
Athlete	Event	Time	Rank	Opposition Result	Opposition Result	Rank
John Croom; Adrian Hegyvary; Gavin Hoover; Ashton Lambie; Daniel Summerhill	Men's	4:03.796	1 Q	—N/a	Colombia; W 4:00.772	1st place, gold medalist(s)
Christina Birch; Kimberly Geist; Chloé Owen; Lily Williams	Women's	4:28.186	1	Colombia; W 4:28.186	Canada; W 4:24.099	1st place, gold medalist(s)

Omnium

Athlete	Event	Scratch race		Tempo race		Elimination race		Points race		Total	
Athlete	Event	Rank	Points	Points	Rank	Rank	Points	Points	Rank	Points	Rank
Daniel Holloway	Men's	3	36	26	1	2	114	67	1	181	1st place, gold medalist(s)
Jennifer Valente	Women's	3	36	33	1	1	116	82	1	198	1st place, gold medalist(s)

=== BMX ===
Freestyle

Athlete	Event	Seeding		Final	
Athlete	Event	Points	Rank	Points	Rank
Justin Dowell	Men's	79.92	3	85.17	3rd place, bronze medalist(s)
Hannah Roberts	Women's	84.42	1	86.67	1st place, gold medalist(s)

Racing

Athlete	Event	Ranking round		Quarterfinal		Semifinal		Final	
Athlete	Event	Time	Rank	Points	Rank	Points	Rank	Time	Rank
Cameron Bramer	Men's	36.814	19	15	5	did not advance			
Cameron Wood	Men's	34.600	11	11	4 Q	21	8	did not advance	
Sophia Foresta	Women's	40.266	9	—N/a		14	5	did not advance	

== Diving ==
The United States qualified a full team of eight divers (four men and four women).

Men

Athlete	Event	Preliminary		Final	
Athlete	Event	Score	Rank	Score	Rank
Andrew Capobianco	1 m springboard	356.30	3 Q	411.25	3rd place, bronze medalist(s)
Michael Hixon	1 m springboard	334.90	8 Q	385.80	6
Andrew Capobianco	3 m springboard	430.40	3 Q	431.85	6
Michael Hixon	3 m springboard	394.80	6 Q	358.95	11
Ben Bramely	10 m platform	355.20	13	did not advance	
Steele Johnson	10 m platform	468.50	1 Q	448.55	5
Andrew Capobianco; Michael Hixon	3 m synchronized springboard	—N/a		404.13	3rd place, bronze medalist(s)
Ben Bramely; Steele Johnson	10 m synchronized platform	—N/a		368.61	4

Women

Athlete	Event	Preliminary		Final	
Athlete	Event	Score	Rank	Score	Rank
Sarah Bacon	1 m springboard	247.25	4 Q	284.10	1st place, gold medalist(s)
Brooke Schultz	1 m springboard	224.25	9 Q	279.45	2nd place, silver medalist(s)
Sarah Bacon	3 m springboard	305.10	4 Q	317.30	5
Brooke Schultz	3 m springboard	313.75	3 Q	334.85	3rd place, bronze medalist(s)
Amy Magaña	10 m platform	319.00	6 Q	349.55	5
Delaney Schnell	10 m platform	329.25	4 Q	354.85	4
Sarah Bacon; Brooke Schultz	3 m synchronized springboard	—N/a		290.10	2nd place, silver medalist(s)
Amy Magaña; Delaney Schnell	10 m synchronized platform	—N/a		281.10	3rd place, bronze medalist(s)

== Equestrian ==
The United States qualified a full team of 12 equestrians (four per discipline).

=== Dressage ===
Athlete	Horse	Event	Qualification						Grand Prix Freestyle / Intermediate I Freestyle	
Athlete	Horse	Event	Grand Prix / Prix St. Georges		Grand Prix Special / Intermediate I		Total		Grand Prix Freestyle / Intermediate I Freestyle	
Athlete	Horse	Event	Score	Rank	Score	Rank	Score	Rank	Score	Rank
Nora Batchelder	Faro SQF	Individual	71.441	5	71.529	5	142.970	5 Q	73.630	5
Jennifer Baumert	Handsome	Individual	72.441	4	70.380	7	142.823	6 Q	75.755	3rd place, bronze medalist(s)
Sarah Lockman	First Apple	Individual	76.088	1	75.912	1	152.000	1 Q	78.980	1st place, gold medalist(s)
Nora Batchelder; Jennifer Baumert; Sarah Lockman	As above	Team	219.970	1	217.821	2	437.791	2nd place, silver medalist(s)	—N/a	

=== Eventing ===
Athlete	Horse	Event	Dressage		Cross-country		Jumping		Total	
Athlete	Horse	Event	Faults	Rank	Faults	Rank	Faults	Rank	Faults	Rank
Boyd Martin	Tsetserleg	Individual	25.60	2	0.00	1	0.00	1	25.60	1st place, gold medalist(s)
Doug Payne	Starr Witness	Individual	28.00	7	8.40	5	0.00	1	36.40	4
Tamie Smith	Mai Baum	Individual	22.80	1	54.00	19	0.00	1	76.80	17
Lynn Symansky	RF Cool Play	Individual	29.20	9	0.00	1	0.00	1	29.20	2nd place, silver medalist(s)
Boyd Martin; Doug Payne; Tamie Smith; Lynn Symansky	As above	Team	76.40	1	8.40	1	0.00	1	91.20	1st place, gold medalist(s)

=== Jumping ===
Athlete	Horse	Event	Qualification								Final							
Athlete	Horse	Event	Round 1		Round 2		Round 3		Total		Round A		Round B		Total		Jump-off	
Athlete	Horse	Event	Faults	Rank	Faults	Rank	Faults	Rank	Faults	Rank	Faults	Rank	Faults	Rank	Faults	Rank	Faults	Rank
Lucy Deslauriers	Hester	Individual	1.32	8	8	15	0	1	9.32	9 Q	4	5 Q	4	9	8	8	did not advance	
Alex Granato	Carlchen W	Individual	0.92	3	16	33	5	14	21.92	21	did not advance							
Eve Jobs	Venue d'Fees des Hazalles	Individual	1.17	6	0	1	8	16	9.17	8 Q	0	1 Q	4	9	4	3	8	5
Beezie Madden	Breitling LS	Individual	0.00	1	0	1	8	16	8.00	6 Q	4	5 Q	0	1	4	3	0	3rd place, bronze medalist(s)
Lucy Deslauriers; Alex Granato; Eve Jobs; Beezie Madden	As above	Team	2.09	1	8	3	13	4	23.09	3rd place, bronze medalist(s)	—N/a							

== Fencing ==
The United States qualified a full team of 18 fencers (nine men and nine women).

Men

Athlete	Event	Ranking round						Round of 16	Quarterfinal	Semifinal	Final / BM	
Athlete	Event	Opposition Result	Opposition Result	Opposition Result	Opposition Result	Opposition Result	Rank	Opposition Result	Opposition Result	Opposition Result	Opposition Result	Rank
Jacob Hoyle	Individual épée	Blais Belanger (CAN); W 3–2	Reytor (CUB); L 3–5	Lugones (ARG); L 2–5	Schwantes (BRA); L 4–5	Ibarra (MEX); W 3–1	5 q	Rodríguez (COL); L 9–15	did not advance			
Curtis McDowald	Individual épée	Núñez (CHI); W 5–3	Limardo (VEN); L 1–5	Ortega (MEX); W 5–3	Garcia (PER); W 5–4	Hsieh Jarov (CAN); W 5–1	2 q	Ortega (MEX); W 15–13	Rodríguez (COL); L 13–15	did not advance		
Jacob Hoyle; James Kaull; Curtis McDowald	Team épée	—N/a							Mexico; W 45–25	Argentina; L 38–45	Bronze medal final Venezuela; L 43–45	4
Race Imboden	Individual foil	Alarcón (CHI); W 5–3	Aguilera (CUB); L 3–5	Servello (ARG); W 5–0	Padua (PUR); W 5–2	Canchez (PER); W 5–0	1 q	Tirado (PUR); W 15–11	Schenkel (CAN); W 15–5	Alarcón (CHI); L 13–15	Did not advance	3rd place, bronze medalist(s)
Gerek Meinhardt	Individual foil	van Haaster (CAN); W 5–3	Carmona (BRA); W 5–2	Arizaga (MEX); W 5–3	Clairet (COL); W 5–1	Marino (ARG); W 5–0	1 Q	Bye	Servello (ARG); W 15–8	van Haaster (CAN); W 15–7	Alarcón (CHI); W 15–11	1st place, gold medalist(s)
Race Imboden; Nick Itkin; Gerek Meinhardt	Team foil	—N/a							Argentina; W 45–12	Colombia; W 45–22	Brazil; W 45–23	1st place, gold medalist(s)
Eli Dershwitz	Individual sabre	Pekelman (BRA); L 3–5	Rodríguez (CUB); L 2–5	Romero (VEN); W 5–2	Huapaya (PER); W 5–3	Lucchetti (ARG); L 4–5	4 q	Lucchetti (ARG); W 15–9	Tella (ARG); L 14–15	did not advance		
Daryl Homer	Individual sabre	Rodríguez (CUB); W 5–2	Polossifakis (CAN); L 4–5	Correa (COL); W 5–2	Alvarez (CHI); W 5–3	Vargas (PER); W 5–2	1 q	Alvarez (CHI); W 15–3	Quintero (VEN); W 15–12	Gordon (CAN); W 15–14	Tella (ARG); W 15–13	1st place, gold medalist(s)
Eli Dershwitz; Daryl Homer; Jeff Spear	Team sabre	—N/a							Cuba; W 45–25	Venezuela; W 45–24	Canada; W 45–41	1st place, gold medalist(s)

Women

Athlete	Event	Ranking round						Round of 16	Quarterfinal	Semifinal	Final / BM	
Athlete	Event	Opposition Result	Opposition Result	Opposition Result	Opposition Result	Opposition Result	Rank	Opposition Result	Opposition Result	Opposition Result	Opposition Result	Rank
Katharine Holmes	Individual épée	Mackinnon (CAN); W 5–1	Medina (MEX); W 5–3	Simeão (BRA); W 3–0	Doig (PER); L 4–5	Dyner (CRC); W 5–0	1 Q	Bye	Rodríguez (CUB); W 15–12	Moellhausen (BRA); W 15–9	Piovesan (VEN); W 14–10	1st place, gold medalist(s)
Catherine Nixon	Individual épée	Mendez (ARG); L 4–5	Rodríguez (CUB); W 5–1	Ramirez (DOM); W 5–2	Moellhausen (BRA); L 3–5	Piovesan (VEN); W 5–3	2 q	Piovesan (VEN); L 9–15	did not advance			
Katharine Holmes; Catherine Nixon; Isis Washington	Team épée	—N/a							Peru; W 45–30	Venezuela; W 45–26	Cuba; W 45–29	1st place, gold medalist(s)
Jacqueline Dubrovich	Individual foil	Carballo (ESA); W 5–3	Gil (PER); L 3–5	Harvey (CAN); L 0–5	Bulcão (BRA); W 5–1	Ondarts (ARG); W 5–1	3 q	Cecchini (BRA); L 13–15	did not advance			
Lee Kiefer	Individual foil	Cecchini (BRA); W 5–1	Michel (MEX); W 5–1	Prieto (COL); W 5–0	Rosales (PER); W 5–0	Moreno (CUB); W 5–1	1 Q	Bye	Mormandi (ARG); W 15–9	Bulcão (BRA); W 15–3	Guo (CAN); W 15–10	1st place, gold medalist(s)
Jacqueline Dubrovich; Lee Kiefer; Nicole Ross	Team foil	—N/a							Cuba; W 45–19	Colombia; W 45–24	Canada; W 45–39	1st place, gold medalist(s)
Chloe Fox-Gitomer	Individual sabre	Botello (MEX); L 1–5	Félix (DOM); L 1–5	Rodriguez (VEN); W 5–0	Page (CAN); L 2–5	Perroni (ARG); W 5–1	5 q	Pérez (ARG); L 13–15	did not advance			
Anne-Elizabeth Stone	Individual sabre	Grench (PAN); W 5–3	Valentín (DOM); W 5–2	Aguilar (PER); W 5–3	Infante (MEX); W 5–1	Morales (COL); W 5–4	1 Q	Bye	Perroni (ARG); W 15–5	Page (CAN); W 15–10	Perez (ARG); W 15–13	1st place, gold medalist(s)
Monica Aksamit; Chloe Fox-Gitomer; Anne-Elizabeth Stone	Team sabre	—N/a							Peru; W 45–15	Mexico; W 45–37	Dominican Republic; W 45–31	1st place, gold medalist(s)

== Field hockey ==
The United States qualified a men's and women's team (of 16 athletes each, for a total of 32) by being ranked among the top three unqualified nations from the 2017 Men's Pan American Cup and 2017 Women's Pan American Cup respectively.

Summary

Team	Event	Group stage				Quarterfinal	Semifinal	Final / BM	
Team	Event	Opposition Result	Opposition Result	Opposition Result	Rank	Opposition Result	Opposition Result	Opposition Result	Rank
United States men	Men's tournament	Peru; W 16–0	Canada; L 0–4	Mexico; W 5–1	2	Cuba; W 5–1	Argentina; L 0–5	Bronze medal final Chile; W 2–1	3rd place, bronze medalist(s)
United States women	Women's tournament	Mexico; W 5–0	Chile; W 4–2	Peru; W 8–0	1	Cuba; W 9–0	Canada; L 0–2	Bronze medal final Chile; W 5–1	3rd place, bronze medalist(s)

=== Men's tournament ===
Roster

The United States announced their squad on 9 July 2019.

Head coach: Rutger Wiese

No.	Pos.	Player	Date of birth (age)	Caps	Club
1	GK	Jonathan Klages	14 May 1997 (aged 22)	24	(Spain) Atletico San Sebastián
3	MF	Michael Barminski	11 February 1993 (aged 26)	81	(United States) Ventura Roadrunners
4	FW	Tyler Sundeen	21 December 1993 (aged 25)	103	(United States) LA Tigers
5	FW	Pat Harris	13 March 1985 (aged 34)	144	(Germany) Mannheimer HC
7	DF	Tom Barratt	6 August 1991 (aged 27)	72	(England) Beeston
9	DF	Adam Miller	15 March 1992 (aged 27)	67	(England) Southgate
10	FW	Alberto Montilla	24 January 1998 (aged 21)	7	(United States) Bulldogs
12	MF	Ajai Dhadwal (Captain)	13 August 1993 (aged 25)	113	
14	DF	Aki Käppeler	10 July 1994 (aged 25)	65	(Germany) TSV Mannheim
15	FW	Kei Käppeler	17 June 1997 (aged 22)	18	(Germany) TSV Mannheim
17	FW	Christian DeAngelis	13 February 1999 (aged 20)	26	(United States) WC Eagles
18	MF	Paul Singh	11 March 1993 (aged 26)	74	(United States) LA Tigers
20	MF	Sean Cicchi	23 March 1995 (aged 24)	97	(United States) Conejo Bulldogs
21	FW	Deegan Huisman	29 October 1997 (aged 21)	21	(Netherlands) Almere
22	DF	Johnny Orozco	18 February 1993 (aged 26)	89	
26	MF	Mohan Gandhi	17 March 1993 (aged 26)	92	(England) Beeston

Preliminary round

Pos	Team	Pld	W	D	L	GF	GA	GD	Pts	Qualification
1	Canada	3	3	0	0	23	2	+21	9	Quarter-finals
2	United States	3	2	0	1	21	5	+16	6	Quarter-finals
3	Mexico	3	1	0	2	10	12	−2	3	Quarter-finals
4	Peru (H)	3	0	0	3	3	38	−35	0	Quarter-finals

Source: FIH
(H) Hosts

30 July 2019
16:00

United States	16–0	Peru
K. Kaeppler 2', 51'; Harris 2'; Huisman 3', 10', 11', 47', 55'; Cicchi 6', 26'; Montilla 7', 39'; Singh 31', 45'; Orozco 47'; Barratt 49'	Report

Umpires:
Deepak Joshi (IND)
Reinier Diaz (CUB)

1 August 2019
12:00

United States	0–4	Canada
	Report	Johnston 5', 11'; Pearson 18'; Kirkpatrick 38'

Umpires:
Peter Wright (RSA)
Federico Silva (ARG)

3 August 2019
12:00

Mexico	1–5	United States
Terminel 41'	Report	Montilla 26', 55'; Sundeen 41'; Harris 43'; A. Käppeler 54'

Umpires:
Peter Wright (RSA)
Reinier Diaz (CUB)

Quarterfinal

5 August 2019
18:00

Cuba	1–5	United States
Consuegra 38'	Report	Harris 36'; A. Käppeler 40'; Huisman 41', 51'; Singh 51'

Umpires:
Tyler Klenk (CAN)
Federico Silva (ARG)

Semifinal

8 August 2019
15:00

Argentina	5–0	United States
Paredes 5'; Vila 14'; Mazzilli 20'; Casella 45'; Martínez 59'	Report

Umpires:
Tyler Klenk (CAN)
Hugo Romero (PAR)

Bronze medal match

10 August 2019
15:00

United States	2–1	Chile
Huisman 2'; A. Käppeler 38'	Report	Renz 50'

Umpires:
Federico Silva (ARG)
Tyler Klenk (CAN)

=== Women's tournament ===
Roster

The following 16 players were named in the United States squad, which was announced on 9 July 2019.

Head Coach: Janneke Schopman

No.	Pos.	Player	Date of birth (age)	Caps	Club
31	GK	Kelsey Bing	1 October 1997 (aged 21)	14	(United States) Texas Pride
5	MF	Casey Umstead	16 February 1996 (aged 23)	15	(United States) X-Calibur
12	MF	Amanda Magadan	28 March 1995 (aged 24)	67	(United States) Rapid Fire Elite
14	MF	Julia Young	8 May 1995 (aged 24)	44	(United States) Focus Field Hockey Club
20	MF	Ali Froede	8 April 1993 (aged 26)	81	(United States) Rampage
28	MF	Caitlin van Sickle	26 January 1990 (aged 29)	138	(United States) First State Diamonds
29	MF	Alyssa Manley	27 May 1994 (aged 25)	114	(United States) Sutters Brigade & High Styx
2	MF	Lauren Moyer	13 May 1995 (aged 24)	63	(United States) Nook Hockey
13	MF	Ashley Hoffman	8 November 1996 (aged 22)	58	(United States) X-Calibur
16	MF	Linnea Gonzales	15 August 1997 (aged 21)	18	(United States) H2O Field Hockey
17	MF	Anna Dessoye	13 July 1994 (aged 25)	44	(United States) Valley Styx
23	MF	Mackenzie Allessie	6 March 2001 (aged 18)	17	(United States) Alleycats
1	FW	Erin Matson	17 March 2000 (aged 19)	54	(United States) WC Eagles
4	FW	Danielle Grega	2 July 1996 (aged 23)	18	(United States) KaPow & PA Elite FHC
24	FW	Kathleen Sharkey (C)	30 April 1990 (aged 29)	166	(United States) Valley Styx
26	FW	Margaux Paolino	1 July 1997 (aged 22)	21	(United States) X-Calibur

Reserves:

- Alyssa Parker
- Kealsie Robles (GK)

Preliminary round

Pos	Team	Pld	W	D	L	GF	GA	GD	Pts	Qualification
1	United States	3	3	0	0	17	2	+15	9	Quarter-finals
2	Chile	3	2	0	1	17	4	+13	6	Quarter-finals
3	Mexico	3	1	0	2	4	7	−3	3	Quarter-finals
4	Peru (H)	3	0	0	3	0	25	−25	0	Quarter-finals

Source: FIH
(H) Hosts

29 July 2019
14:00

United States	5–0	Mexico
Grega 27'; Magadan 34'; Moyer 38'; Matson 38'; Hoffman 40'	Report

Umpires:
Maria Locatelli (ARG)
Catalina Montesino (CHI)

31 July 2019
12:00

Chile	2–4	United States
De las Heras 12'; Urroz 36'	Report	Matson 50'; Moyer 51'; Froede 53'; Sharkey 56'

Umpires:
Amber Church (NZL)
Victoria Pazos (PAR)

2 August 2019
12:00

United States	8–0	Peru
Moyer 7'; Grega 29'; Matson 30'; Allessie 32', 34', 40', 49'; Sharkey 60'	Report

Umpires:
Natalia Lodeiro (URU)
Catalina Montesino (CHI)

Quarterfinal

4 August 2019
17:15

Cuba	0–9	United States
	Report	Moyer 8'; Hoffman 14'; Allessie 22', 43'; Umstead 36'; Grega 37', 53'; Manley 38'; Sharkey 44'

Umpires:
Megan Robertson (CAN)
Maria Locatelli (ARG)

Semifinal

6 August 2019
17:15

Canada	2–0	United States
Johansen 10'; Secco 35'	Report

Umpires:
Amber Church (NZL)
Victoria Pazos (PAR)

Bronze medal match

9 August 2019
15:00

Chile	1–5	United States
De las Heras 3'	Report	Moyer 2'; Matson 19', 24', 52'; Sharkey 21'

Umpires:
Amber Church (NZL)
Maria Locatelli (ARG)

== Football ==
=== Men's tournament ===
United States qualified but declined to enter.

=== Women's tournament ===
United States qualified but declined to enter.

== Golf ==
The United States qualified a full team of 4 golfers by virtue of their positions in the Official World Golf Rankings and Women's World Golf Rankings.

Athlete	Event	Round 1	Round 2	Round 3	Round 4	Total		
Athlete	Event	Score	Score	Score	Score	Score	Par	Rank
Stewart Hagestad	Men's individual	65	73	70	70	278	−6	13
Brandon Wu	Men's individual	64	65	70	71	270	−14	4
Emilia Migliaccio	Women's individual	70	68	68	70	276	−8	1st place, gold medalist(s)
Rose Zhang	Women's individual	72	76	72	69	289	+5	8
Stewart Hagestad; Emilia Migliaccio; Brandon Wu; Rose Zhang	Mixed team	134	133	138	139	544	−24	1st place, gold medalist(s)

== Gymnastics ==
The United States qualified a full team of 21 gymnasts (five men and five women in artistic gymnastics, two individual and a team of five women in rhythmic gymnastics, and two men and two women in trampoline gymnastics) through the 2018 Pan American Gymnastics Championships.

=== Artistic ===
Men

Team final and individual qualification

Athlete	Event	Apparatus						Total	
Athlete	Event	F	PH	R	PB	V	HB	Score	Rank
Cameron Bock	Team	13.700 Q	13.950	13.650	14.400 Q	14.400	—N/a		
Grant Breckenridge	Team	—N/a			14.000	14.300	13.200	—N/a	
Brody Malone	Team	13.550	14.500 Q	13.550	14.150 Q	14.450	7.850	78.050	12 Q
Robert Neff	Team	14.050 Q	14.100 Q	13.000	13.900	14.250	13.050	82.350	1 Q
Genki Suzuki	Team	12.100	12.950	13.200	—N/a		13.200 Q	—N/a	
Team	Team	41.300	42.550	40.400	42.550	43.150	39.450	249.400	2nd place, silver medalist(s)

Individual finals

Athlete	Event	Apparatus						Total	
Athlete	Event	F	PH	R	PB	V	HB	Score	Rank
Brody Malone	All-around	14.050	12.550	13.500	12.300	14.550	13.500	80.450	5
Robert Neff	All-around	12.750	12.450	12.650	13.400	14.450	14.000	79.700	7
Cameron Bock	Floor	13.166	—N/a					13.166	8
Robert Neff	Floor	14.166	—N/a					14.166	2nd place, silver medalist(s)
Brody Malone	Pommel horse	—N/a	12.766	—N/a				12.766	4
Robert Neff	Pommel horse	—N/a	13.466	—N/a				13.466	2nd place, silver medalist(s)
Cameron Bock	Parallel bars	—N/a			14.033	—N/a		14.033	3rd place, bronze medalist(s)
Brody Malone	Parallel bars	—N/a			13.533	—N/a		13.533	5
Geniki Suzuki	Horizontal bar	—N/a					13.800	13.800	6

Women

Team final and individual qualification

Athlete	Event	Apparatus				Total	
Athlete	Event	F	BB	V	UB	Score	Rank
Kara Eaker	Team	13.850 Q	14.850 Q	14.200	13.800	56.700	2 Q
Aleah Finnegan	Team	13.750	—N/a	14.700 Q	—N/a		
Morgan Hurd	Team	13.300	13.100	14.300	13.100	54.950	4
Riley McCusker	Team	14.050 Q	14.250 Q	13.850	14.250 Q	57.050	1 Q
Leanne Wong	Team	—N/a	13.650	—N/a	14.250 Q	—N/a	
Team	Team	41.650	42.750	43.200	43.400	171.000	1st place, gold medalist(s)

Individual finals

Athlete	Event	Apparatus				Total	
Athlete	Event	F	BB	V	UB	Score	Rank
Kara Eaker	All-around	12.350	13.500	13.950	13.950	53.750	4
Riley McCusker	All-around	13.525	14.200	14.250	13.150	55.125	2nd place, silver medalist(s)
Kara Eaker	Floor	13.800	—N/a			13.800	2nd place, silver medalist(s)
Riley McCusker	Floor	13.300	—N/a			13.300	5
Kara Eaker	Balance beam	—N/a	15.266	—N/a		15.266	1st place, gold medalist(s)
Riley McCusker	Balance beam	—N/a	13.333	—N/a		13.333	3rd place, bronze medalist(s)
Riley McCusker	Uneven bars	—N/a			14.533	14.533	1st place, gold medalist(s)
Leanne Wong	Uneven bars	—N/a			14.300	14.300	2nd place, silver medalist(s)

=== Rhythmic ===
Individual

Athlete	Event	Apparatus				Total	
Athlete	Event	Ball	Clubs	Hoop	Ribbon	Score	Rank
Camilla Feeley	All-around	18.300 Q	18.000 Q	17.745 Q	16.950 Q	70.725	2nd place, silver medalist(s)
Evita Griskenas	All-around	19.925 Q	17.500 Q	19.900 Q	18.500 Q	75.825	1st place, gold medalist(s)
Camilla Feeley	Ball	17.900	—N/a			17.900	3rd place, bronze medalist(s)
Evita Griskenas	Ball	18.900	—N/a			18.900	1st place, gold medalist(s)
Camilla Feeley	Clubs	—N/a	17.950	—N/a		17.950	1st place, gold medalist(s)
Evita Griskenas	Clubs	—N/a	17.500	—N/a		17.500	3rd place, bronze medalist(s)
Camilla Feeley	Hoop	—N/a		17.700	—N/a	17.700	3rd place, bronze medalist(s)
Evita Griskenas	Hoop	—N/a		19.800	—N/a	19.800	1st place, gold medalist(s)
Camilla Feeley	Ribbon	—N/a			15.500	15.500	4
Evita Griskenas	Ribbon	—N/a			17.950	17.950	1st place, gold medalist(s)

Group

Athlete	Event	Apparatus		Total	
Athlete	Event	5 balls	3 hoops + 2 clubs	Score	Rank
Isabelle Connor; Yelyzaveta Merenzon; Elizaveta Pletneva; Nicole Sladkov; Kristina Sobelevskaya	All-around	22.825 Q	23.150 Q	45.975	2nd place, silver medalist(s)
Isabelle Connor; Yelyzaveta Merenzon; Elizaveta Pletneva; Nicole Sladkov; Kristina Sobelevskaya	5 balls	24.100	—N/a	24.100	2nd place, silver medalist(s)
Isabelle Connor; Yelyzaveta Merenzon; Elizaveta Pletneva; Nicole Sladkov; Kristina Sobelevskaya	3 hoops + 2 clubs	—N/a	17.950	17.950	5

=== Trampoline ===
Athlete	Event	Qualification		Final	
Athlete	Event	Score	Rank	Score	Rank
Jeffrey Gluckstein	Men's	105.920	1 Q	57.290	2nd place, silver medalist(s)
Ruben Padilla	Men's	105.675	2 Q	57.160	3rd place, bronze medalist(s)
Nicole Ahsinger	Women's	97.000	6 Q	52.550	2nd place, silver medalist(s)
Jessica Stevens	Women's	98.750	5 Q	52.120	4

== Handball ==
The United States qualified men's and women's teams by defeating Canada in a home and away series in September 2018.

Summary

Team	Event	Preliminary round				Semifinal	Final / BM	
Team	Event	Opposition Result	Opposition Result	Opposition Result	Rank	Opposition Result	Opposition Result	Rank
United States men	Men's tournament	Argentina; L 25–38	Cuba; W 26–25	Chile; L 26–34	3	5th–8th classification Peru; W 22–16	5th place final Cuba; L 24–32	6
United States women	Women's tournament	Argentina; L 15–26	Dominican Republic; W 26–22	Peru; W 29–11	2 Q	Brazil; L 9–34	Bronze medal final Cuba; L 23–24	4

=== Men's tournament ===
Pos	Team	Pld	W	D	L	GF	GA	GD	Pts	Qualification
1	Argentina	3	3	0	0	92	75	+17	6	Semifinals
2	Chile	3	2	0	1	101	85	+16	4	Semifinals
3	United States	3	1	0	2	77	97	−20	2	5–8th place semifinals
4	Cuba	3	0	0	3	74	87	−13	0	5–8th place semifinals

Source: Lima 2019
Rules for classification: 1) points; 2) head-to-head points; 3) head-to-head goal difference; 4) head-to-head goals scored; 5) goal difference; 6) goals scored; 7) draw.

31 July 2019; 20:30	Argentina	38–25	United States	Villa Deportiva Nacional; Referees: Pinto, Menezes (BRA)
31 July 2019; 20:30	Baronetto 7	(21–13)	Fofana 7	Villa Deportiva Nacional; Referees: Pinto, Menezes (BRA)
31 July 2019; 20:30	1× (yellow card) 6× (suspension)	Report	2× (yellow card) 7× (suspension)	Villa Deportiva Nacional; Referees: Pinto, Menezes (BRA)

1 August 2019; 15:30	United States	26−25	Cuba	Villa Deportiva Nacional; Referees: Lenci, López (ARG)
1 August 2019; 15:30	Hoddersen 7	(14−14)	Taboada, Veitía 5	Villa Deportiva Nacional; Referees: Lenci, López (ARG)
1 August 2019; 15:30	1× (yellow card) 4× (suspension)	Report	2× (yellow card) 2× (suspension)	Villa Deportiva Nacional; Referees: Lenci, López (ARG)

2 August 2019; 13:00	United States	26−34	Chile	Villa Deportiva Nacional; Referees: Sosa, Lemes (URU)
2 August 2019; 13:00	Hines 5	(11−17)	Ceballos, R. Salinas 8	Villa Deportiva Nacional; Referees: Sosa, Lemes (URU)
2 August 2019; 13:00	3× (yellow card) 3× (suspension)	Boxscore	1× (yellow card) 4× (suspension)	Villa Deportiva Nacional; Referees: Sosa, Lemes (URU)

5th–8th place classification

4 August 2019; 12:00	United States	22–16	Peru	Villa Deportiva Nacional; Referees: Pinto, Menezes (BRA)
4 August 2019; 12:00	Hoddersen 8	(13–7)	Alvarado, Zerillo 3	Villa Deportiva Nacional; Referees: Pinto, Menezes (BRA)
4 August 2019; 12:00	3× (yellow card) 2× (suspension)	Report	6× (suspension) 1× (red card)	Villa Deportiva Nacional; Referees: Pinto, Menezes (BRA)

5th place match

5 August 2019; 12:00	Cuba	32–24	United States	Villa Deportiva Nacional; Referees: Sosa, Lemes (URU)
5 August 2019; 12:00	Corzo, Toledano 5	(16–10)	Fofana 7	Villa Deportiva Nacional; Referees: Sosa, Lemes (URU)
5 August 2019; 12:00	1× (yellow card) 1× (suspension)	Report	3× (suspension) 1× (red card)	Villa Deportiva Nacional; Referees: Sosa, Lemes (URU)

=== Women's tournament ===
Preliminary round

Pos	Team	Pld	W	D	L	GF	GA	GD	Pts	Qualification
1	Argentina	3	3	0	0	105	39	+66	6	Semifinals
2	United States	3	2	0	1	70	59	+11	4	Semifinals
3	Dominican Republic	3	1	0	2	85	69	+16	2	5–8th place semifinals
4	Peru (H)	3	0	0	3	34	127	−93	0	5–8th place semifinals

Source: Lima 2019
Rules for classification: 1) points; 2) head-to-head points; 3) head-to-head goal difference; 4) head-to-head goals scored; 5) goal difference; 6) goals scored; 7) draw.
(H) Hosts

24 July 2019; 18:00	Argentina	26−15	United States	Villa Deportiva Nacional; Referees: Zuñiga, Reyes (CUB)
24 July 2019; 18:00	Karsten 5	(13−8)	Andersen, Rhoads 5	Villa Deportiva Nacional; Referees: Zuñiga, Reyes (CUB)
24 July 2019; 18:00	1× (yellow card) 3× (suspension)	Report	2× (yellow card) 6× (suspension)	Villa Deportiva Nacional; Referees: Zuñiga, Reyes (CUB)

25 July 2019; 13:00	United States	26−22	Dominican Republic	Villa Deportiva Nacional; Referees: Pinto, Menezes (BRA)
25 July 2019; 13:00	Rhoads, Taylor, 7	(11−10)	three players 4	Villa Deportiva Nacional; Referees: Pinto, Menezes (BRA)
25 July 2019; 13:00	2× (yellow card) 4× (suspension)	Report	3× (yellow card) 5× (suspension)	Villa Deportiva Nacional; Referees: Pinto, Menezes (BRA)

27 July 2019; 15:30	United States	29–11	Peru	Villa Deportiva Nacional; Referees: Zuñiga, Reyes (CUB)
27 July 2019; 15:30	Butler, Taylor 5	(16–8)	Cruz, Servat 4	Villa Deportiva Nacional; Referees: Zuñiga, Reyes (CUB)
27 July 2019; 15:30	3× (yellow card) 3× (suspension)	Report	1× (suspension)	Villa Deportiva Nacional; Referees: Zuñiga, Reyes (CUB)

Semifinal

29 July 2019; 20:30	Brazil	34–9	United States	Villa Deportiva Nacional; Referees: Pineda, Estrada (COL)
29 July 2019; 20:30	Castro 8	(15–3)	Rhoads 5	Villa Deportiva Nacional; Referees: Pineda, Estrada (COL)
29 July 2019; 20:30	1× (yellow card) 2× (suspension)	Report	1× (yellow card) 2× (suspension)	Villa Deportiva Nacional; Referees: Pineda, Estrada (COL)

Bronze medal match

30 July 2019; 18:00	Cuba	24–23	United States	Villa Deportiva Nacional; Referees: Paolantoni, García (ARG)
30 July 2019; 18:00	Rizo 6	(13–12)	Andersen 8	Villa Deportiva Nacional; Referees: Paolantoni, García (ARG)
30 July 2019; 18:00	2× (yellow card) 4× (suspension)	Report	3× (suspension)	Villa Deportiva Nacional; Referees: Paolantoni, García (ARG)

== Judo ==
The United States qualified 13 judokas (six men and seven women).

Men

Athlete	Event	Round of 16	Quarterfinal	Semifinal	Repechage	Final / BM	
Athlete	Event	Opposition Result	Opposition Result	Opposition Result	Opposition Result	Opposition Result	Rank
Adonis Diaz	–60 kg	—N/a	Torres (BRA); L 01–10	Did not advance	Vergara (PAN); W 01–00	Bronze medal final Calle (PER); W 01–00	3rd place, bronze medalist(s)
Ryan Vargas	–66 kg	Castillo (MEX); L 00–01	did not advance				
Nick Delpopolo	–73 kg	Bye	Eduardo Araújo (MEX); L 00–10	Did not advance	Langlois (CAN); W 10–00	Bronze medal final Mattey (VEN); W 01–00	3rd place, bronze medalist(s)
Jack Hatton	–81 kg	Bye	Peña (VEN); W 10–00	Santos (BRA); L 00–10	Bye	Bronze medal final Gandia (PUR); L 00–10	5
L.A. Smith	–100 kg	Bye	Esquivel (MEX); W 10–00	Angulo (ECU); W 10–00	Bye	Briceño (CHI); L 01–10	2nd place, silver medalist(s)
Ajax Tadehara	+100 kg	Alvarado (PER); W 10–00	Figueroa (ECU); L 00–10	Did not advance	Campos (ARG); W 10–00	Bronze medal final Moura (BRA); L 00–10	5

Women

Athlete	Event	Round of 16	Quarterfinal	Semifinal	Repechage	Final / BM	
Athlete	Event	Opposition Result	Opposition Result	Opposition Result	Opposition Result	Opposition Result	Rank
Anne Suzuki	–48 kg	—N/a	Godinez (CUB); L 00–10	Did not advance	Farias (BRA); L 00–01	did not advance	
Amelia Fulgentes	–57 kg	Bye	Silva (BRA); L 00–10	Did not advance	Garcia (MEX); L 00–10	did not advance	
Hannah Martin	–63 kg	Bye	Castilhos (BRA); L 00–01	Did not advance	Lucia (ARG); W 10–00	Bronze medal final Awiti (MEX); W 10–00	3rd place, bronze medalist(s)
Chantal Wright	–70 kg	Morales (PER); W 11–01	Alvear (COL); L 00–11	Did not advance	Burt (CAN); L 00–10	did not advance	
Nefeli Papadakis	–78 kg	Figueroa (PER); W 01–00	Aguiar (BRA); L 00–10	Did not advance	Cardenas (MEX); L 00–01	did not advance	
Nina Cutro-Kelly	+78 kg	Bye	Marenco (NCA); W 10–00	Ortiz (CUB); L 00–10	Bye	Bronze medal final Bolivar (PER); L00–10	5

== Karate ==
The United States qualified a team of nine karatekas (four men and five women).

Kumite (sparring)

Athlete	Event	Round robin				Semifinal	Final	
Athlete	Event	Opposition Result	Opposition Result	Opposition Result	Rank	Opposition Result	Opposition Result	Rank
Tom Scott	Men's −75 kg	Verissimo (BRA); W 4–1	Valdiva (PER); W 3–0	Landázuri (COL); W 1–1	1 Q	Soriano (DOM); W 4–0	Verissimo (BRA); W 2–1	1st place, gold medalist(s)
Kamran Madani	Men's −84 kg	Macedo (URU); W 4–0	Yussuf (BOL); W 2–0	Cuevas (MEX); W 1–0	1 Q	Valera (VEN); W 1–0	Sinisterra (COL); W DSQ	(gold)
Brian Irr	Men's +84 kg	Perez (ARG); W 4–1	Gaysinsky (CAN); T 0–0	Castillo (DOM); W	2 Q	Rojas (CHI); W 2–0	Gaysinsky (CAN); W 5–0	1st place, gold medalist(s)
Shannon Nishi	Women's −50 kg	Benitez (ARG); W 3–0	Rodriguez (PER); W 3–1	Paula (BRA); W 1–0	1 Q	Gonzalez (GUA); W 3–2	Hernández (MEX); W 2–0	1st place, gold medalist(s)
Ashley Hill	Women's −61 kg	Caballero (MEX); L 0–1	Diaz (DOM); L 0–1	Jumaa (CAN); L 0–5	4	did not advance		
Cheryl Murphy	Women's −68 kg	Sepe (BRA); W 1–0	Mosquera (COL); L 0–1	Cuervo (VEN); L 0–3	3	did not advance		
Cirrus Lingl	Women's +68 kg	Castro (ARG); W 4–3	Molina (VEN); L 2–5	—N/a	2 Q	Rodriguez (DOM); L 3–5	Did not advance	3rd place, bronze medalist(s)

Kata (forms)

Athlete	Event	Pool round 1		Pool round 2		Final / BM	
Athlete	Event	Score	Rank	Score	Rank	Opposition Result	Rank
Ariel Torres	Men's individual	24.78	1 Q	24.60	1 Q	Díaz (VEN); L 25.46–25.82	2nd place, silver medalist(s)
Sakura Kokumai	Women's individual	24.60	1 Q	24.94	1 Q	Dimitrova (DOM); W 25.82–DQ	1st place, gold medalist(s)

== Modern pentathlon ==
The United States qualified five modern pentathletes (two men and three women).

Athlete	Event	Fencing (Épée one touch)				Swimming (200 m freestyle)			Riding (Show jumping)			Shooting / Running (10 m laser pistol / 3000 m cross-country)			Total	
Athlete	Event	V – D	Rank	MP points	BP	Time	Rank	MP points	Penalties	Rank	MP points	Time	Rank	MP points	MP points	Rank
Brendan Anderson	Men's individual	17–14	16	215	1	2:09.75	14	291	EL		0	11:25.00	13	615	1122	23
Amro El Geziry	Men's individual	21–10	7	233	1	1:58.02	1	314	11	5	289	11:31.00	15	609	1446	5
Brendan Anderson; Amro El Geziry	Men's relay	16–10	=4	234	1	1:55.11	2	320	26	2	274	10:58.00	4	647	1476	2nd place, silver medalist(s)
Samantha Achterberg	Women's individual	15–16	=16	201	1	2:20.54	4	269	7	5	293	12:06.00	1	574	1338	2nd place, silver medalist(s)
Jessica Davis	Women's individual	14–17	=18	194	0	2:29.65	17	251	EL		0	12:41.00	6	539	984	23
Isabella Isaksen	Women's individual	16–15	15	208	0	2:25.12	9	260	41	14	259	13:11.00	12	509	1236	10
Samantha Achterberg; Jessica Davis	Women's relay	27–13	=1	245	0	2:11.68	3	287	73	4	227	11:49.00	1	591	1350	1st place, gold medalist(s)
Amro El Geziry; Isabella Isaksen	Mixed relay	39–9	1	270	2	1:59.99	1	311	10	3	290	11:46.00	5	594	1467	1st place, gold medalist(s)

== Racquetball ==
The United States qualified five racquetball athletes (three men and two women).

Athlete	Event	Preliminary round				Round of 16	Quarterfinal	Semifinal	Final	
Athlete	Event	Opposition Result	Opposition Result	Opposition Result	Rank	Opposition Result	Opposition Result	Opposition Result	Opposition Result	Rank
Jacob Bredenbeck	Men's singles	Franco (COL); W 15–10, 15–9	Luque (PER); W 15–6, 15–1	Galicia (GUA); W 15–12, 15–5	1 q	De León (DOM); W 15–3, 15–9	Mercado (COL); L 8–15, 15–8, 8–11	did not advance		
Charlie Pratt	Men's singles	Iwaasa (CAN); L 15–14, 11–15, 9–11	Troncoso (CHI); W 15–7, 15–2	Manzuri (ARG); W WO	2	Pérez (DOM); W 13–15, 15–10, 11–5	Moscoso (BOL); L 7–15, 7–15	did not advance		
Rocky Carson; Charlie Pratt	Men's doubles	Iwaasa / Murray (CAN); W 15–12, 10–15, 11–9	Kurzbard / Manzuri (ARG); W 15–11, 8–15, 11–4	Galicia / Slavatierra (GUA); W 15–6, 15–11	1 Q	Bye	Franco / Mercado (COL); W 5–15, 15–7, 11–7	Montoya / Mar (MEX); L 15–11, 9–15, 8–11	Did not advance	3rd place, bronze medalist(s)
Jacob Bredenbeck; Rocky Carson; Charlie Pratt	Men's team	—N/a				Bye	Costa Rica; W 2–0, 2–0	Bolivia; L 2–1, 1–2, 1–2	Did not advance	3rd place, bronze medalist(s)
Kelani Lawrence	Women's singles	M P Muñoz (ECU); L 5–15, 6–15	Saunders (CAN); W 15–7, 15–5	Ortiz (CRC); W 15–13, 15–3	2 q	Muñoz (CHI); W 15–10, 11–15, 11–7	Vargas (ARG); L 9–15, 13–15	did not advance		
Rhonda Rajsich	Women's singles	Mejia (MEX); W 15–4, 15–7	Lambert (CAN); W 15–10, 15–5	—N/a	1 q	Delgado (DOM); W 15–8, 15–14	Riveros (COL); L 10–15, 10–15	did not advance		
Kelani Lawrence; Rhonda Rajsich	Women's doubles	M J Muñoz / M P Muñoz (ECU); W 15–10, 15–1	Longoria / Salas (MEX); L 5–15, 9–15	—N/a	2 q	Bye	Barrios / Daza (BOL); W 15–9, 15–4	Longoria / Salas (MEX); L 6–15, 1–15	Did not advance	3rd place, bronze medalist(s)
Kelani Lawrence; Rhonda Rajsich	Women's team	—N/a				Bye	Colombia; W 2–0, 2–0	Mexico; L 0–2, 0–2	Did not advance	3rd place, bronze medalist(s)

== Roller sports ==
=== Artistic ===
Athlete	Event	Short program		Long program		Total	
Athlete	Event	Score	Rank	Score	Rank	Score	Rank
John Burchfield	Men's	41.80	6	91.37	2	133.17	2nd place, silver medalist(s)
Alexis Herbert	Women's	18.51	6	30.88	6	49.39	6

=== Speed ===
Athlete	Event	Preliminary		Semifinal		Final	
Athlete	Event	Time	Rank	Time	Rank	Time	Rank
Jonathan Blair	Men's 300 m time trial	—N/a				26.511	10
Jonathan Blair	Men's 500 m	44.869	1 Q	45.487	3	did not advance	
Herbert Harbison	Men's 10,000 m elimination	—N/a				EL	8
Kelsey Helman	Women's 300 m time trial	—N/a				21.131	9
Kelsey Helman	Women's 500 m	47.103	3	did not advance			
Kelsey Helman	Women's 10,000 m elimination	—N/a				19:35.411	3rd place, bronze medalist(s)

== Rowing ==
The United States qualified 11 boats, for a total of 20 rowers, at the 2018 Pan American Qualification Regatta.

Men

Athlete	Event	Heat		Repechage		Semifinal		Final	
Athlete	Event	Time	Rank	Time	Rank	Time	Rank	Time	Rank
Lucas Bellows	Single sculls	7:08.74	1 SA/B	Bye		7:05.48	1 FA	8:08.69	6
James Garay; Logan Smith	Pair	7:40.13	5 FA	—N/a				6:59.37	6
Nathan Lado; Wes Vear	Double sculls	6:36.49	4 R	6:31.96	3 FB	—N/a		6:37.81	8
Cooper Hurley; Jimmy McCullough	Lightweight double sculls	7:56.54	5 R	6:37.95	4 FB	—N/a		6:44.38	9
Thaddeus Babiec; Veton Celaj; Paul Verni; Jonathan Zagroba	Four	6:30.86	4 FA	—N/a				6:26.56	5
Thaddeus Babiec; Veton Celaj; James Garay; Coral Kasden; Kyle Peabody; Jason Read; Logan Smith; Paul Verni; Jonathan Zagroba	Eight	6:21.73	5 FA	—N/a				5:53.60	6

Women

Athlete	Event	Heat		Repechage		Final	
Athlete	Event	Time	Rank	Time	Rank	Time	Rank
Jenifer Forbes	Single sculls	7:57.40	1 FA	Bye		7:52.75	5
Liz Euiler; Solveig Imsdahl	Pair	7:43.38	4 FA	—N/a		7:57.33	4
Maggie Fellows; Julia Lonchar	Double sculls	7:07.33	2 FA	—N/a		7:12.72	2nd place, silver medalist(s)
Sydney Taylor; Keara Twist	Lightweight double sculls	7:59.64	4 R	7:24.25	5 FB	Race not held	
Maggie Fellows; Julia Lonchar; Sydney Taylor; Keara Twist	Quadruple sculls	6:54.55	4 FA	—N/a		6:36.11	3rd place, bronze medalist(s)

Qualification legend: FA – Qualify to medal final; FB – Qualify to non-medal final; SA/B – Qualify to semifinal; R – Qualify to repechage

== Rugby sevens ==
The United States men's and women's teams are automatically qualified to the Pan American Games.

Summary

Team	Event	Pool stage				Semifinal / Cl.	Final / BM / Pl.	
Team	Event	Opposition Result	Opposition Result	Opposition Result	Rank	Opposition Result	Opposition Result	Rank
United States men	Men's tournament	Guyana; W 62–0	Chile; W 20–7	Brazil; L 10–12	2 Q	Argentina; L 7–31	Bronze medal final Brazil; W 24–19	3rd place, bronze medalist(s)
United States women	Women's tournament	Trinidad and Tobago; W 55–0	Argentina; W 49–0	Colombia; W 38–0	1 Q	Brazil; W 33–19	Canada; L 10–24	2nd place, silver medalist(s)

=== Men's tournament ===
Pool stage

Pos	Team	Pld	W	D	L	PF	PA	PD	Pts	Qualification
1	Brazil	3	2	1	0	85	24	+61	8	Semifinals
2	United States	3	2	0	1	92	19	+73	7	Semifinals
3	Chile	3	1	1	1	108	41	+67	6	5–8th place semifinals
4	Guyana	3	0	0	3	7	208	−201	3	5–8th place semifinals

Source: Lima 2019
Rules for classification: 1) Points; 2) Head-to-head result; 3) Point difference; 4) Points scored; 5) draw.

26 July 2019
11:55

United States	62–0	Guyana
Try: Melphy 0'c Noble 2'c Brown (3) 4'm, 9'm, 11'c Wheeler 5'm Tupuola 7'c Lachina 8'c Broselle (2) 10'm, 14'c Con: Melphy (4/6) 1', 2', 7', 8'; Fuala'au (2/4) 12', 14'	Report

Villa María del Triunfo Sports Center
Referee: Nehuen Jauri Rivero (Argentina)

27 July 2019
12:15

United States	20–7	Chile
Try: Clark (3) 7'm, 7'm, 9'm Melphy 9'm Con: Melphy (0/4)	Report	Try: Blanc 5'c Con: Fernández (1/1) 6'

Villa María del Triunfo Sports Center
Referee: Francisco Gonzalez (Uruguay)

27 July 2019
16:05

United States	10–12	Brazil
Try: Fuala'au 3'm Clark 6'm Con: Melphy (0/2)	Report	Try: da Silva 1'm Giantorno 11'c Con: Reeves (1/1) 12'; M. Duque (0/1)

Villa María del Triunfo Sports Center
Referee: Nehuen Jauri Rivero (Argentina)

Semifinal

28 July 2019
12:05

Argentina	31–7	United States
Try: Luna (2) 2'c, 3'c Osadczuk 6'c Álvarez 9'm Vanni 14'm Con: Mare (3/4) 2', 4', 7'; Bazan Velez (0/1)	Report	Try: Clark 0'c Con: Melphy (1/1) 0'

Villa María del Triunfo Sports Center
Referee: Francisco Gonzalez (Uruguay)

Bronze medal match

28 July 2019
15:05

Brazil	19–24 (a.e.t.)	United States
Try: Tranquez 5'c F. Sancery 7'c L. Duque 8'm Con: M. Duque (1/1) 6'; L. Duque (1/1) 7'; Reeves (0/1)	Report	Try: Wheeler (2) 3'c, 10'c Clark 12'm Tupuola 19'; Con: Melphy (2/3) 4', 11'; Drop: Melphy (0/1)

Villa María del Triunfo Sports Center
Referee: Dale Hall (Canada)

=== Women's tournament ===
Pool stage

Pos	Team	Pld	W	D	L	PF	PA	PD	Pts	Qualification
1	United States	3	3	0	0	142	0	+142	9	Semifinals
2	Colombia	3	2	0	1	62	62	0	7	Semifinals
3	Argentina	3	1	0	2	55	73	−18	5	5–8th place semifinals
4	Trinidad and Tobago	3	0	0	3	10	134	−124	3	5–8th place semifinals

Source: Lima 2019
Rules for classification: 1) Points; 2) Head-to-head result; 3) Point difference; 4) Points scored; 5) draw.

26 July 2019
10:15

United States	55–0	Trinidad and Tobago
Try: Emba (2) 1'm, 6'c Canett 3'c Kirshe (2) 5'm, 7'm Rovetti 8'm Ramsey (2) 10'c, 12'c, 14'c Con: Olsen (3/5) 4', 13', 14'; Canett (1/3) 7'; Emba (1/1) 10'	Report

Villa María del Triunfo Sports Center
Referee: Nerea Livoni (Argentina)

27 July 2019
10:35

United States	49–0	Argentina
Try: Tapper (3) 1'm, 6'm, 8'm Henrich 2'm Emba (2) 7'c, 11'm Olsen (2) 9'm, 14'm Rovetti 12'm Con: Emba (1/3) 7'; Olsen (1/6) 10'	Report

Villa María del Triunfo Sports Center
Referee: Shanda Mosher-Gallant (Canada)

27 July 2019
14:25

United States	38–0	Colombia
Try: Maher 1'c Ramsey (3) 6'm, 9'm, 12'c Rovetti 8'c Henrich 14'c Con: Emba (2/3) 1', 14'; Olsen (2/3) 8', 12'	Report

Villa María del Triunfo Sports Center
Referee: Nerea Livoni (Argentina)

Semifinal

28 July 2019
11:15

United States	33–19	Brazil
Try: Ramsey (2) 0'c, 7'c Matyas 3'm Henrich 8'c Gustaitis 12'c Con: Olsen (3/4) 1', 8', 9'; Canett (1/1) 13'	Report	Try: Costa 7'c B. Silva (2) 11', 14'; Con: Kochhann (1/2) 7'; Cerullo (1/1) 14'

Villa María del Triunfo Sports Center
Referee: Shanda Mosher-Gallant (Canada)

Gold medal match

28 July 2019
15:30

(gold) Canada	24–10	United States (silver)
Try: Hogan-Rochester (3) 1'c, 6'm, 8'c Nicholas 11'm Con: Nicholas (2/3) 1', 9'; Levale (0/1)	Report	Try: Canett 2'm Maher 12'm Con: Olsen (0/2)

Villa María del Triunfo Sports Center
Referee: Nehuen Jauri Rivero (Argentina)

== Sailing ==
The United States has qualified 11 boats for a total of 17 sailors.

Men

Athlete	Event	Race													Total	
Athlete	Event	1	2	3	4	5	6	7	8	9	10	11	12	M	Points	Rank
Pedro Pascual	RS:X	1	2	4	2	4	3	2	2	5	3	2	5	8	38	2nd place, silver medalist(s)
Charlie Buckingham	Laser	2	1	2	6	5	1	4	5	5	2	—N/a		10	47	3rd place, bronze medalist(s)
Ian MacDiarmid; Andrew Mollerus	49er	4	1	7	5	3	6	3	2	4	1	2	3	8	42	4

Women

Athlete	Event	Race													Total	
Athlete	Event	1	2	3	4	5	6	7	8	9	10	11	12	M	Points	Rank
Farrah Hall	RS:X	8 OCS	4	4	5	6	4	5	3	3	4	4	3	2	49	4
Charlotte Rose	Laser radial	15	1	7	1	1	1	1	1	2	3	—N/a		4	26	2nd place, silver medalist(s)
Stephanie Roble; Maggie Shea	49erFX	3	1	3	3	1	2	2	3	4	2	3	2	8	33	2nd place, silver medalist(s)

Mixed

Athlete	Event	Race													Total	
Athlete	Event	1	2	3	4	5	6	7	8	9	10	11	12	M	Points	Rank
Ernesto Rodriguez; Hallie Schiffman	Snipe	1	3	2	6	2	1	1	4	3	3	—N/a		6	32	1st place, gold medalist(s)
Skip Dieball; Ian Jones; Jody Swanson	Lightning	2	2	3	7	5	5	4	3	7	3	—N/a		12; OCS	46	5
Riley Gibbs; Anna Weis	Nacra 17	8	3	1	1	1	1	1	1	4	2	1	3	4	23	1st place, gold medalist(s)

Open

Athlete	Event	Race																					Total	
Athlete	Event	1	2	3	4	5	6	7	8	9	10	11	12	13	14	15	16	17	18	M1	M2	M3	Points	Rank
Will Cyr	Kites	2	3	2	3 STP	2	2	3	3	3	3	3	3	2	2	6	3	2	2	8 STP	6	10	61	3rd place, bronze medalist(s)
Conner Blouin	Sunfish	5	4	1	3	10	1	11	4	5	10	—N/a								6	—N/a		49	4

== Shooting ==
The United States qualified 22 athletes through the 2018 Shooting Championships of the Americas.

Men

Athlete	Event	Qualification		Final	
Athlete	Event	Points	Rank	Points	Rank
Nick Mowrer	10 m air pistol	575	1 Q	236.7	2nd place, silver medalist(s)
Jay Shi	10 m air pistol	569	7 Q	111.1	8
Jackson Leverett III	25 m rapid fire pistol	578	5 Q	12	5
Keith Sanderson	25 m rapid fire pistol	586 PR	1 Q	16	4
Lucas Kozeniesky	10 m air rifle	622.1	3 Q	248.2 PR	1st place, gold medalist(s)
Tim Sherry	10 m air rifle	621.0	4 Q	183.0	5
Michael McPhail	50 m rifle three position	1159	4 Q	453.9	2nd place, silver medalist(s)
Tim Sherry	50 m rifle three position	1181	1 Q	455.8 PR	1st place, gold medalist(s)
Brian Burrows	Trap	119	5 Q	43 PR	1st place, gold medalist(s)
Derek Haldeman	Trap	120	=3 Q	40	2nd place, silver medalist(s)
Christian Elliot	Skeet	122+4	2 Q	50 PR	1st place, gold medalist(s)
Phillip Jungman	Skeet	120+2	5 Q	31	4

Women

Athlete	Event	Qualification		Final	
Athlete	Event	Points	Rank	Points	Rank
Nathalia Granados	10 m air pistol	561	8 Q	114.6	8
Miglena Todorva	10 m air pistol	558	=9	did not advance	
Nathlia Granados	25 m pistol	566	8 Q	4	8
Sandra Uptagrafft	25 m pistol	573	5 Q	27+6	1st place, gold medalist(s)
Minden Miles	10 m air rifle	627.4 PR	1 Q	246.4	2nd place, silver medalist(s)
Alison Weisz	10 m air rifle	620.5	6 Q	249.4 PR	1st place, gold medalist(s)
Sarah Beard	50 m rifle three position	1165	2 Q	454.9 PR	1st place, gold medalist(s)
Virginia Thrasher	50 m rifle three position	1162	4 Q	444.0	3rd place, bronze medalist(s)
Ashley Carroll	Trap	120 PR	1 Q	40 PR	1st place, gold medalist(s)
Rachel Tozier	Trap	118	2 Q	37	2nd place, silver medalist(s)
Kim Rhode	Skeet	119 PR	1 Q	55 PR	1st place, gold medalist(s)
Dania Vizzi	Skeet	117	3 Q	40	3rd place, bronze medalist(s)

Mixed

Athlete	Event	Qualification		Final	
Athlete	Event	Points	Rank	Points	Rank
Nick Mowrer; Miglena Todorva	10 m air pistol	760	2 Q	471.3	2nd place, silver medalist(s)
Nathalia Granados; Jay Shi	10 m air pistol	760	3 Q	373.6	4
Lucas Kozeniesky; Mindy Miles	10 m air rifle	838.0	1 Q	498.5	2nd place, silver medalist(s)
Tim Sherry; Ali Weisz	10 m air rifle	834.6	2 Q	390.6	4
Brian Burrows; Rachel Tozier	Trap	140	1 Q	42 PR +7	2nd place, silver medalist(s)
Ashley Carroll; Derek Haldeman	Trap	138	3 Q	42 PR +8	1st place, gold medalist(s)

== Softball ==
The United States qualified a women's team (of 15 athletes) by winning the 2017 Women's Pan American Championships. The men's team (also consisting of 15 athletes) qualified later by also finishing in the top five nations at the 2017 Men's Pan American Championships.

Summary

Team	Event	Round robin						Semifinal	Bronze medal final	Final	
Team	Event	Opposition Result	Opposition Result	Opposition Result	Opposition Result	Opposition Result	Rank	Opposition Result	Opposition Result	Opposition Result	Rank
United States men	Men's tournament	Venezuela; W 8–3	Cuba; W 4–3	Argentina; L 0–3	Peru; W 20–0	Mexico; W 6–2	2 Q	Argentina; L 0–7	Mexico; W 7–4	Argentina; L 0–5	2nd place, silver medalist(s)
United States women	Women's tournament	Mexico; W 9–0	Puerto Rico; W 6–0	Canada; W 6–1	Venezuela; W 9–0	Peru; W 7–0	1 Q	Canada; L2–3	Puerto Rico; W 3–1	Canada; W 3–1	1st place, gold medalist(s)

=== Men's tournament ===
Preliminary round

Team	Pld	W	L	RF	RA	RD	Qualification
Argentina	5	5	0	29	4	+25	Qualified for the semifinals
United States	5	4	1	38	10	+28	Qualified for the semifinals
Cuba	5	3	2	33	22	+11	Qualified for the semifinals
Mexico	5	2	3	31	23	+8	Qualified for the semifinals
Venezuela	5	1	4	7	17	−10	
Peru	5	0	5	0	62	−62	

25 July 2019; 13:00	Venezuela	3–8	United States	Softball Field, Villa María del Triunfo; Attendance: 0
25 July 2019; 13:00		Boxscore		Softball Field, Villa María del Triunfo; Attendance: 0

27 July 2019; 13:00	United States	4–2	Cuba	Softball Field, Villa María del Triunfo; Attendance: 723
27 July 2019; 13:00		Boxscore		Softball Field, Villa María del Triunfo; Attendance: 723

28 July 2019; 10:00	Argentina	3–0	United States	Softball Field, Villa María del Triunfo; Attendance: 715
28 July 2019; 10:00		Boxscore		Softball Field, Villa María del Triunfo; Attendance: 715

29 July 2019; 16:00	Peru	0–20	United States	Softball Field, Villa María del Triunfo
29 July 2019; 16:00		Boxscore		Softball Field, Villa María del Triunfo

30 July 2019; 14:00	United States	6–2	Mexico	Softball Field, Villa María del Triunfo
30 July 2019; 14:00		Boxscore		Softball Field, Villa María del Triunfo

Semifinals

31 July 2019; 14:00	Argentina	7–0	United States	Softball Field, Villa María del Triunfo
31 July 2019; 14:00		Boxscore		Softball Field, Villa María del Triunfo

Final

1 August 2019; 10:00	United States	7–4	Mexico	Softball Field, Villa María del Triunfo
1 August 2019; 10:00		Boxscore		Softball Field, Villa María del Triunfo

Grand final

1 August 2019; 14:00	Argentina	5–0	United States	Softball Field, Villa María del Triunfo
1 August 2019; 14:00		Boxscore		Softball Field, Villa María del Triunfo

=== Women's tournament ===
Preliminary round

Team	Pld	W	L	RF	RA	RD	Qualification
United States	5	5	0	37	1	+36	Qualified for the semifinals
Canada	5	4	1	23	7	+16	Qualified for the semifinals
Puerto Rico	5	3	2	18	12	+6	Qualified for the semifinals
Mexico	5	2	3	20	17	+3	Qualified for the semifinals
Venezuela	5	1	4	9	41	−32	
Peru	5	0	5	5	34	−29	

4 August 2019; 13:00	Mexico	0–9	United States	Campo de Softbol, Lima; Attendance: 1 013
4 August 2019; 13:00		Boxscore		Campo de Softbol, Lima; Attendance: 1 013

5 August 2019; 10:00	United States	6–0	Puerto Rico	Campo de Softbol, Lima; Attendance: 312
5 August 2019; 10:00		Boxscore		Campo de Softbol, Lima; Attendance: 312

6 August 2019; 10:00	Canada	1–6	United States	Campo de Softbol, Lima; Attendance: 312
6 August 2019; 10:00		Boxscore		Campo de Softbol, Lima; Attendance: 312

7 August 2019; 10:00	United States	9–0	Venezuela	Campo de Softbol, Lima; Attendance: 280
7 August 2019; 10:00		Boxscore		Campo de Softbol, Lima; Attendance: 280

8 August 2019; 16:00	United States	7–0	Peru	Campo de Softbol, Lima; Attendance: 524
8 August 2019; 16:00		Boxscore		Campo de Softbol, Lima; Attendance: 524

Semifinals

9 August 2019; 14:00	United States	2 - 3	Canada	Campo de Softbol, Lima; Attendance: 540
9 August 2019; 14:00		Boxscore		Campo de Softbol, Lima; Attendance: 540

Final

10 August 2019; 10:00	United States	3–1	Puerto Rico	Campo de Softbol, Lima; Attendance: 650
10 August 2019; 10:00		Boxscore		Campo de Softbol, Lima; Attendance: 650

Grand final

10 August 2019; 14:00	United States	3–1	Canada	Campo de Softbol, Lima; Attendance: 850
10 August 2019; 14:00		Boxscore		Campo de Softbol, Lima; Attendance: 850

== Squash ==
The United States qualified a full team of 6 athletes through the 2018 Pan American Squash Championships.

Men

Athlete	Event	Group stage			Round of 32	Round of 16	Quarterfinal	Semifinal / Cl.	Final / BM / Pl.	
Athlete	Event	Opposition Result	Opposition Result	Rank	Opposition Result	Opposition Result	Opposition Result	Opposition Result	Opposition Result	Rank
Chris Hanson	Singles	—N/a			Bye	Enriquez (GUA); W 11–4, 11–2, 11–2	Rodríguez (COL); L 5–11, 7–11, 11–13	did not advance		
Todd Harrity	Singles	—N/a			Bye	Romiglio (ARG); W 11–4, 11–7, 11–3	Elías (PER); L 10–12, 5–11, 5–11	did not advance		
Chris Hanson; Todd Harrity	Doubles	—N/a				Bye	Browne / Franklin (BER); W 11–6, 11–7	Elías / Escudero (PER); W 11–8, 11–8	Delierre / Sachvie (CAN); W 6–11, 11–5, 11–8	1st place, gold medalist(s)
Andrew Douglas; Chris Hanson; Todd Harrity	Team	Jamaica; W 3–0, 3–0, 3–0	Chile; W 3–0, 3–0, 3–0	1 Q	—N/a	Bye	Brazil; W 3–0, 3–0	Mexico; W 0–3, 3–1, 3–2	Colombia; W 1–3, 3–0, 3–1	1st place, gold medalist(s)

Women

Athlete	Event	Group stage				Round of 16	Quarterfinal	Semifinal	Final / BM	
Athlete	Event	Opposition Result	Opposition Result	Opposition Result	Rank	Opposition Result	Opposition Result	Opposition Result	Opposition Result	Rank
Olivia Blatchford	Singles	—N/a				Bye	García (MEX); W 11–8, 11–4, 11–4	Cornett (CAN); W 11–7, 11–5, 11–6	Sobhy (USA); L 11–7, 5–11, 7–11, 8–11	2nd place, silver medalist(s)
Amanda Sobhy	Singles	—N/a				Bye	Delgado (CHI); W 11–4, 11–4, 11–3	Naughton (CAN); W 11–6, 12–10, 11–8	Blatchford (USA); W 7–11, 11–5, 11–7, 11–8	1st place, gold medalist(s)
Amanda Sobhy; Sabrina Sobhy	Doubles	—N/a					Etchechoury / Grasso (ARG); W 11–3, 11–8	Delgado / Pinto (CHI); W 11–5, 11–3	Cornett / Letourneau (CAN); W 11–10, 11–8	1st place, gold medalist(s)
Olivia Blatchford; Amanda Sobhy; Sabrina Sobhy	Team	Argentina; W 3–0, 3–0, 3–0	Mexico; W 3–0, 3–0, 2–0	Chile; W 3–0, 3–0, 3–0	1 Q	—N/a	Peru; W 3–0, 3–0, 2–0	Mexico; W 3–0, 3–1, 2–0	Canada; W 3–0, 3–0	1st place, gold medalist(s)

Mixed

Athlete	Event	Quarterfinal	Semifinal	Final	
Athlete	Event	Opposition Result	Opposition Result	Opposition Result	Rank
Olivia Blatchford; Andrew Douglas	Doubles	Duany / Hermosa (PER); W 11–3, 11–3	Ávila / García (MEX); L 6–11, 5–11	Did not advance	3rd place, bronze medalist(s)

== Surfing ==
The United States qualified six surfers (four men and two women) in the sport's debut at the Pan American Games.

Artistic

Athlete	Event	Round 1	Round 2	Round 3	Round 4	Repechage 1	Repechage 2	Repechage 3	Repechage 4	Repechage 5	Bronze medal	Final	
Athlete	Event	Opposition Result	Opposition Result	Opposition Result	Opposition Result	Opposition Result	Opposition Result	Opposition Result	Opposition Result	Opposition Result	Opposition Result	Opposition Result	Rank
Kevin Schulz	Men's open	Young (CAN); L 7.50–10.43	did not advance			Correa (PER); L 8.10–10.84	did not advance						
Daniel Hughes	Men's stand up paddleboard	Dinz (BRA), Rodríguez (MEX); W 10.93 Q	de Cabo (ARG), Spencer (CAN); L 11.50 Q	Martino (PER); L 9.26–14.93	Did not advance	Bye		de Armas (PUR); W 9.90–6.96	Diniz (BRA); W 11.20–6.00	—N/a	Martino (PER); L 10.84–18.90	Did not advance	3rd place, bronze medalist(s)
Cole Robbins	Men's longboard	Ferrer (PUR), Flores (CRC); W 11.93 Q	Prete (ARG), Schweizer (URU); W 15.10 Q	Concicao (BRA); W 16.33–11.90	Clemente (PER); L 13.27–15.67	Bye				—N/a	Schweizer (URU); L 12.50 – 15.10	Did not advance	3rd place, bronze medalist(s)
Tiare Thompson	Women's open	Rosas (PER); L 8.80–10.66	did not advance			Gómez (COL); L 10.80–13.84	did not advance						
Candice Appleby	Women's stand up paddleboard	Alabi (ESA), Pérez (CHI); W 5.43 Q	Cosoleto (ARG), Pacelli (BRA); L 8.07 Q	Torres (PER); L 4.87–8.37	Did not advance	Bye		Soriano (ECU); 5.54–1.50	Gómez (COL); L 7.00–12.83	—N/a	did not advance		
Tiare Thompson	Women's longboard	Bermudez (VEN), Calmon (BRA); L 11.17 Q	Boggan (ARG), Reyes (PER); W 10.27 Q	Dempfle-Olin (CAN); L 10.36–12.03	Did not advance	Bye		Reyes (PER); L 10.86–13.97	Did not advance	—N/a	did not advance		

Race

Athlete	Event	Time	Rank
Connor Baxter	Men's stand up paddleboard	24:18.7	1st place, gold medalist(s)
Candice Appleby	Women's stand up paddleboard	34:03.9	2nd place, silver medalist(s)

== Swimming ==
The United States qualified a full team of 36 swimmers in the pool events and a further four swimmers for the open water events.

Men

Athlete	Event	Heat		Final	
Athlete	Event	Time	Rank	Time	Rank
Nathan Adrian	50 m freestyle	22.12	3 Q	21.87	2nd place, silver medalist(s)
Michael Chadwick	50 m freestyle	21.95	1 Q	21.99	3rd place, bronze medalist(s)
Nathan Adrian	100 m freestyle	49.54	6 Q	48.17	2nd place, silver medalist(s)
Michael Chadwick	100 m freestyle	48.94	1 Q	48.88	3rd place, bronze medalist(s)
Grant House	200 m freestyle	1:49.40	5 Q	1:48.58	6
Drew Kibler	200 m freestyle	1:48.02	2 Q	1:47.71	3rd place, bronze medalist(s)
Andrew Abruzzo	400 m freestyle	3:49.46	1 Q	3:48.41	1st place, gold medalist(s)
Chris Wieser	400 m freestyle	3:50.23	2 Q	3:50.49	4
Andrew Abruzzo	800 m freestyle	—N/a		7:57.40	1st place, gold medalist(s)
Nicholas Sweetser	800 m freestyle	—N/a		7:56.96	4
Andrew Abruzzo	1500 m freestyle	—N/a		15:22.93	5
Nicholas Sweetser	1500 m freestyle	—N/a		15:14.24	2nd place, silver medalist(s)
Nick Alexander	100 m backstroke	54.68	3 Q	54.76	4
Daniel Carr	100 m backstroke	53.97	1 Q	53.50	1st place, gold medalist(s)
Nick Alexander	200 m backstroke	1:59.81	2 Q	1:58.30	2nd place, silver medalist(s)
Daniel Carr	200 m backstroke	1:58.55	1 Q	1:58.13	1st place, gold medalist(s)
Kevin Cordes	100 m breaststroke	1:00.58	4 Q	1:00 27	3rd place, bronze medalist(s)
Cody Miller	100 m breaststroke	1:00.28	3 Q	59.57	2nd place, silver medalist(s)
Nic Fink	200 m breaststroke	2:10.02	1 Q	2:08.16	2nd place, silver medalist(s)
Will Licon	200 m breaststroke	2:10.62	2 Q	2:07.62	1st place, gold medalist(s)
Matthew Josa	100 m butterfly	52.28	3 Q	52.22	5
Tom Shields	100 m butterfly	53.29	5 Q	51.59	1st place, gold medalist(s)
Sam Pomajevich	200 m butterfly	1:58.19	2 Q	1:57.35	2nd place, silver medalist(s)
Tom Shields	200 m butterfly	1:58.82	4 Q	2:06.65	8
Will Licon	200 m individual medley	2:00.97	1 Q	1:59.13	1st place, gold medalist(s)
Charles Swanson	400 m individual medley	4:16.66	1 Q	4:11.46	1st place, gold medalist(s)
Nathan Adrian; Michael Chadwick; Grant House; Drew Kibler	4 × 100 m freestyle relay	—N/a		3:14.94	2nd place, silver medalist(s)
Drew Kibler; Grant House; Sam Pomajevich; Chris Wieser	4 × 200 m freestyle relay	—N/a		7:14.82	2nd place, silver medalist(s)
Nathan Adrian; Nick Alexander*; Daniel Carr; Michael Chadwick*; Nic Fink; Matthew Josa*; Tom Shields	4 × 100 m medley relay	3:33.91	1 Q	3:30.25 PR	1st place, gold medalist(s)
Taylor Abbott	10 km open water	—N/a		1:52:04.7	(silver)
T.C. Smith	10 km open water	—N/a		1:57:27.6	11

Women

Athlete	Event	Heat		Final	
Athlete	Event	Time	Rank	Time	Rank
Margo Geer	50 m freestyle	25.51	3 Q	25.03	2nd place, silver medalist(s)
Madison Kennedy	50 m freestyle	25.46	1 Q	25.14	3rd place, bronze medalist(s)
Margo Geer	100 m freestyle	54.65	1 Q	54.17	1st place, gold medalist(s)
Lia Neal	100 m freestyle	56.49	5 Q	55.62	4
Meaghan Raab	200 m freestyle	1:58.42	1 Q	1:58.70	2nd place, silver medalist(s)
Claire Rasmus	200 m freestyle	1:59.35	2 Q	1:58.64	1st place, gold medalist(s)
Mariah Denigan	400 m freestyle	4:14.49	5 Q	4:12.23	4
Rebecca Mann	400 m freestyle	4:15.69	7 Q	4:15.51	8
Mariah Denigan	800 m freestyle	—N/a		8:34.18	2nd place, silver medalist(s)
Rebecca Mann	800 m freestyle	—N/a		8:38.25	5
Mariah Denigan	1500 m freestyle	—N/a		16:27.50	4
Rebecca Mann	1500 m freestyle	—N/a		16:23.23	3rd place, bronze medalist(s)
Phoebe Bacon	100 m backstroke	59.66	1 Q	59.47	1st place, gold medalist(s)
Ali DeLoof	100 m backstroke	1:01.12	3 Q	1:01.17	4
Isabelle Stadden	200 m backstroke	2:09.15	1 Q	2:08.39	2nd place, silver medalist(s)
Alex Walsh	200 m backstroke	2:10.06	2 Q	2:08.30	1st place, gold medalist(s)
Molly Hannis	100 m breaststroke	1:07.59	3 Q	1:08.32	6
Anne Lazor	100 m breaststroke	1:06.79	1 Q	1:06.94	1st place, gold medalist(s)
Bethany Galat	200 m breaststroke	2:27.81	3 Q	2:21.84	2nd place, silver medalist(s)
Anne Lazor	200 m breaststroke	2:26.71	1 Q	2:21.40 PR	1st place, gold medalist(s)
Sarah Gibson	100 m butterfly	59.16	3 Q	59.11	3rd place, bronze medalist(s)
Kendyl Stewart	100 m butterfly	58.82	1 Q	58.49	1st place, gold medalist(s)
Sarah Gibson	200 m butterfly	2:11.78	2 Q	2:13.08	5
Meghan Small	200 m butterfly	2:14.04	7 Q	2:12.51	3rd place, bronze medalist(s)
Meghan Small	200 m individual medley	2:13.05	1 Q	2:11.36	2nd place, silver medalist(s)
Alex Walsh	200 m individual medley	2:14.55	2 Q	2:11.24	1st place, gold medalist(s)
Mariah Denigan	400 m individual medley	4:48.99	3 Q	4:48.47	5
Allie Szekely	400 m individual medley	4:57.14	8 Q	4:45.29	4
Margo Geer; Lia Neal; Meaghan Raab; Claire Rasmus	4 × 100 m freestyle relay	—N/a		3:39.59	1st place, gold medalist(s)
Sarah Gibson; Meaghan Raab; Claire Rasmus; Alex Walsh	4 × 200 m freestyle relay	—N/a		7:57.33	1st place, gold medalist(s)
Phoebe Bacon; Margo Geer; Sarah Gibson*; Molly Hannis*; Anne Lazor; Lia Neal*; Isabelle Stadden*; Kendyl Stewart	4 × 100 m medley relay	4:04.32	1 Q	3:57.64	1st place, gold medalist(s)
Katy Campbell	10 km open water	—N/a		2:01:57.5	5
Rebecca Mann	10 km open water	—N/a		2:04:47.0	10

Mixed

Athlete	Event	Heat		Final	
Athlete	Event	Time	Rank	Time	Rank
Andrew Abruzzo*; Nathan Adrian; Michael Chadwick; Ali DeLoof*; Margo Geer; Madison Kennedy*; Claire Rasmus; Charles Swanson*	4 × 100 m freestyle relay	3:33.52	2 Q	3:24.84	1st place, gold medalist(s)
Phoebe Bacon; Kevin Cordes*; Margo Geer; Matthew Josa*; Cody Miller; Meaghan Raab*; Tom Shields; Isabelle Stadden*	4 × 100 m medley relay	3:48.27	1 Q	DQ	

Qualification legend: Q – Qualify to the medal final; q – Qualify to the non-medal final

* – Indicates that the athlete swam in the heat but not the final

== Table tennis ==
The United States qualified a full team of 6 athletes through the 2018 Pan American Table Tennis Championships.

Men

Athlete	Event	Group stage			Round of 32	Round of 16	Quarterfinal	Semifinal	Final / BM	
Athlete	Event	Opposition Result	Opposition Result	Rank	Opposition Result	Opposition Result	Opposition Result	Opposition Result	Opposition Result	Rank
Kanak Jha	Singles	—N/a			You (HON); W 4–0	Alto (ARG); W 4–1	Miño (ECU); W 4–1	Wu (DOM); L 2–4	Did not advance	3rd place, bronze medalist(s)
Nikhil Kumar	Singles	—N/a			Santos (DOM); W 4–2	Madrid (MEX); L 2–4	did not advance			
Nikhil Kumar; Nicholas Tio	Doubles	—N/a				Miño / Riofrio (ECU); W 4–3	Alto / Cifuentes (ARG); L 2–4	did not advance		
Kanak Jha; Nikhil Kumar; Nicolas Tio	Team	Ecuador; W 3–2, 3–1, 3–2	Puerto Rico; W 1–3, 3–0, 3–1, 3–1	1 Q	—N/a		Dominican Republic; W 3–1, 3–0, 0–3, 3–0	Brazil; W 3–2, 0–3, 3–2, 3–2	Argentina; W 3–1, 3–0, 0–3, 1–3, 3–0	1st place, gold medalist(s)

Women

Athlete	Event	Group stage			Round of 32	Round of 16	Quarterfinal	Semifinal	Final / BM	
Athlete	Event	Opposition Result	Opposition Result	Rank	Opposition Result	Opposition Result	Opposition Result	Opposition Result	Opposition Result	Rank
Jennifer Wu	Singles	—N/a			Plaza (ECU); W 4–0	Yamada (BRA); W 4–3	Vega (CHI); W 4–0	M Díaz (PUR); W 4–2	A Díaz (PUR); L 1–4	2nd place, silver medalist(s)
Lily Zhang	Singles	—N/a			Vargas (PER); W 4–0	Lovet (CUB); W 4–0	Takahashi (BRA); L 3–4	did not advance		
Amy Wang; Lily Zhang	Doubles	—N/a				Bye	Barcenas / Silva (MEX); W 4–0	Cóté / Zhang (CAN); W 4–1	A Díaz / M Díaz (PUR); L 3–4	2nd place, silver medalist(s)
Amy Wang; Jennifer Wu; Lily Zhang	Team	Guatemala; W 3–0, 3–1, 3–0	Argentina; W 3–0, 3–0, 3–0	1 Q	—N/a		Cuba; W 3–0, 3–0, 3–0	Brazil; L 3–2, 1–3, 3–1, 1–3, 0–3	Did not advance	3rd place, bronze medalist(s)

Mixed

Athlete	Event	Round of 16	Quarterfinal	Semifinal	Final / BM	
Athlete	Event	Opposition Result	Opposition Result	Opposition Result	Opposition Result	Rank
Kanak Jha; Jennifer Wu	Doubles	Bye	Ortiz / Wu (DOM); W 4–2	Wang / Zhang (CAN); L 1–4	Did not advance	3rd place, bronze medalist(s)

== Taekwondo ==
Kyorugi (sparring)

Men

Athlete	Event	Preliminary round	Quarterfinal	Semifinal	Repechage	Final / BM	
Athlete	Event	Opposition Result	Opposition Result	Opposition Result	Opposition Result	Opposition Result	Rank
David Kim	–58 kg	Diaz (CAN); W 29–9	Guzman (ARG); L 3–5	Did not advance	—N/a	Bronze medal final Granado (VEN); W 10–8	3rd place, bronze medalist(s)
CJ Nickolas	–68 kg	Sealy (JAM); W 25–18	Pie (DOM); L 9–10	Did not advance	Hernández (PUR); W 21–6	Bronze medal final Morales (CHI); L 11–30	=5
Thomas Rahimi	–80 kg	Bye	Cobas (CUB); L 3–11	did not advance			
Jonathan Healy	+80 kg	Montalvo (COL); W 11–7	Sio (ARG); W 18–12	Andrade (BRA); W 9–4	Bye	Alba (CUB); W 13–6	1st place, gold medalist(s)

Women

Athlete	Event	Preliminary round	Quarterfinal	Semifinal	Repechage	Final / BM	
Athlete	Event	Opposition Result	Opposition Result	Opposition Result	Opposition Result	Opposition Result	Rank
Monique Rodriguez	–49 kg	Dellan (VEN); W 8–7	Reis (BRA); L 21–29	Did not advance	—N/a	Bronze medal final Aguirre (CUB); W 16–7	3rd place, bronze medalist(s)
Anastasija Zolotic	–57 kg	Bye	Lindo (CRC); W 23–8	Carstens (PAN); W 24–10	—N/a	Park (CAN); W 32–22	1st place, gold medalist(s)
Paige McPherson	–67 kg	Bye	Arnoldt (ARG); W 25–7	Kraayeveld (CAN); W 11–9	Bye	Titoneli (BRA); L 8–9	2nd place, silver medalist(s)
Madelynn Gorman-Shore	+67 kg	Bye	Mosquera (COL); L 5–16	Did not advance	Lawrence (TTO); W 15–6	Bronze medal final Carbonell (CUB); W 8–5	3rd place, bronze medalist(s)

Poomsae (forms)

Athlete	Event	Score	Rank
Alex Lee	Men's individual	7.660	1st place, gold medalist(s)
Karyn Real	Women's individual	7.510	3rd place, bronze medalist(s)
Ethan Sun; Yi Sae-Jin	Mixed pair	6.920	4
Alex Lee; Andrew Lee; Karyn Real; Ethan Sun; Yi Sae-Jin	Mixed freestyle team	7.240	1st place, gold medalist(s)

== Tennis ==
Men

Athlete	Event	Round of 64	Round of 32	Round of 16	Quarterfinal	Semifinal	Final / BM	
Athlete	Event	Opposition Result	Opposition Result	Opposition Result	Opposition Result	Opposition Result	Opposition Result	Rank
Kevin King	Singles	Bye	Wild (BRA); L 4–6, 2–6	did not advance				
Michael Redlicki	Singles	Bye	Zeballos (BOL); W 6–2, 6–0	Bagnis (ARG); L 4–6, 1–6	did not advance			
Sam Riffice	Singles	Llanes (URU); W 6–1, 4–6, 7–5	King (BAR); L 4–6, 3–6	did not advance				
Kevin King; Michael Redlicki	Doubles	—N/a	Alvarado / Miralles (ESA); W 6–1, 6–1	Escobar / Quiroz (ECU); L 3–6, 0–6	did not advance			

Women

Athlete	Event	Round of 32	Round of 16	Quarterfinal	Semifinal	Final / BM	
Athlete	Event	Opposition Result	Opposition Result	Opposition Result	Opposition Result	Opposition Result	Rank
Usue Arconada	Singles	Iamachkine (PER); W 6–1, 6–0	Vagramov (CAN); W 7–5, 6–2	Podoroska (ARG); L 4–6, 4–6	did not advance		
Caroline Dolehide	Singles	González (PAR); W 6–4, 2–6, 6–4	Zacarías (MEX); W 6–1, 6–7^{(3–7)}, 6–1	Seguel (CHI); W 7–5, 7–6^{(7–2)}	Alves (BRA); W 7–6^{(7–5)}, 6–2	Podoroska (ARG); L 6–2, 3–6, 6–7^{(4–7)}	2nd place, silver medalist(s)
Alexa Graham	Singles	Arango (COL); W 6–2, 6–2	Zarazúa (MEX); L 6–7^{(6–7)}, 6–4	did not advance			
Usue Arconada; Caroline Dolehide	Doubles	—N/a	Bye	Guzman / Schaefer (PER); W 6–1, 6–1	Guarachi / Seguel (CHI); W 7–5, 6–3	Cepede / González (PAR); W 6–0, 6–4	1st place, gold medalist(s)

Mixed

Athlete	Event	Round of 16	Quarterfinal	Semifinal	Final / BM	
Athlete	Event	Opposition Result	Opposition Result	Opposition Result	Opposition Result	Rank
Alexa Graham; Sam Riffice	Doubles	Giraldo / Osorio (COL); L 3–6, 6–3, 3–10	did not advance			

== Triathlon ==
The United States qualified a full team of six triathletes, four through the 2018 Pan American Mixed Relay Championships and two further through the International Triathlon Union World Rankings.

Individual

Athlete	Event	Swimming (1.5 km)	Transition 1	Biking (40.02 km)	Transition 2	Running (8.88 km)	Total	Rank
Austin Hindman	Men's	17:42	0:51	1:00:29	0:21	32:41	1:52:03	12
William Huffman	Men's	17:39	0:53	1:00:33	0:25	31:41	1:51:09	5
Jason West	Men's	17:54	0:52	1:00:16	0:25	33:52	1:53:19	15
Sophie Chase	Women's	19:47	0:58	1:04:43	0:32	36:30	2:02:28	4
Mary Alex England	Women's	19:53	0:54	1:10:01	0:31	38:53	2:10:12	16
Avery Evenson	Women's	19:07	0:59	1:08:36	0:33	39:05	2:08:20	14

Mixed relay

Athlete	Event	Swimming (300 m)	Transition 1	Biking (6.6 km)	Transition2	Running (1.5 km)	Total	Rank
Sophie Chase	Mixed relay	4:23	0:57	10:35	0:27	4:53	21:13	—N/a
Avery Evenson	Mixed relay	3:59	0:59	11:13	0:25	4:53	21:26	—N/a
Austin Hindman	Mixed relay	3:38	0:51	10:19	0:23	4:31	19:41	—N/a
William Hufman	Mixed relay	3:51	0:51	9:27	0:24	4:20	18:51	—N/a
Total	Mixed relay	—N/a					1:21:10	4

== Volleyball ==
=== Beach ===
The United States qualified four beach volleyball athletes (two men and two women).

Athlete	Event	Group stage				Round of 16	Quarterfinal	Semifinal / Cl.	Final / BM / Pl.	
Athlete	Event	Opposition Result	Opposition Result	Opposition Result	Rank	Opposition Result	Opposition Result	Opposition Result	Opposition Result	Rank
Mark Burik; Ian Satterfield	Men's	Escobar – Vargas (ESA); W 2–0 (21–12, 21–10)	Phillip – Stewart (TTO); W 2–0 (21–13, 21–16)	Azaad – Capogrosso (ARG); L 1–2 (21–19, 10–21, 12–15)	2 Q	Nusbaum - Plantinga (CAN); L 0–2 (19–21, 12–21)	Did not advance	9th–12th semifinal Medina - Sánchez (DOM); W 2–0 (21–13, 21–12)	9th place match García - Leonardo (GUA); L 1–2 (24–22, 35–37, 11–15)	10
Karissa Cook; Jace Pardon	Women's	Davidson – Grant (TTO); W 2–0 (21–9, 21–8)	Araya – Valenciano (CRC); W 2–0 (21–11, 21–11)	Ayala – Ríos (COL); W 2–0 (22–20, 21–14)	1 Q	Bye	Caballero - Valiente (PAR); W 2–0 (21–8, 21–10)	Horta - Lavalle (BRA); W 2–0 (24–22, 21–16)	Gallay - Pereyra (ARG); W 2–1 (14–21, 22–20, 15–10)	1st place, gold medalist(s)

=== Indoor ===
The United States women's team qualified for the Pan American Games through the 2018 Women's Pan-American Volleyball Cup. The United States men's team qualified through the 2019 Men's Pan-American Volleyball Cup.

Summary

Team	Event	Group stage				Semifinal	Final / BM / Pl.	
Team	Event	Opposition Result	Opposition Result	Opposition Result	Rank	Opposition Result	Opposition Result	Rank
United States men	Men's tournament	Chile; L 1–3	Mexico; W 3–0	Brazil; L 2–3	3	Did not advance	5th place final Puerto Rico; L 2–3	6
United States women	Women's tournament	Argentina; L 2–3	Puerto Rico; W 3–2	Brazil; L 0–3	4	Did not advance	7th place final Canada; W 3–0	7

=== Men's tournament ===
Group stage

Pos	Team	Pld	W	L	Pts	SW	SL	SR	SPW	SPL	SPR	Qualification
1	Brazil	3	3	0	11	9	4	2.250	303	260	1.165	Semifinals
2	Chile	3	2	1	9	7	5	1.400	263	266	0.989	Semifinals
3	United States	3	1	2	8	6	6	1.000	252	270	0.933	5th–6th place match
4	Mexico	3	0	3	2	2	9	0.222	246	268	0.918	7th–8th place match

Source: Lima 2019

31 July 2019; 18:30	United States	1–3	Chile	Callao Sports Center; Referees: David Reyes (PUR), Nicolás Casado (ARG)
31 July 2019; 18:30	(17–25, 17–25, 25–17, 22–25); P2 P3			Callao Sports Center; Referees: David Reyes (PUR), Nicolás Casado (ARG)

1 August 2019; 18:30	United States	3–0	Mexico	Callao Sports Center; Referees: Nicolás Casado (ARG), Josmer Perez (DOM)
1 August 2019; 18:30	(26–24, 25–22, 25–23); P2 P3			Callao Sports Center; Referees: Nicolás Casado (ARG), Josmer Perez (DOM)

2 August 2019; 20:30	United States	2–3	Brazil	Callao Sports Center; Referees: Josmer Perez (DOM), Randy Sánchez (MEX)
2 August 2019; 20:30	(25–23, 25–21, 17–25, 19–25, 9–15); P2 P3			Callao Sports Center; Referees: Josmer Perez (DOM), Randy Sánchez (MEX)

5th place match

3 August 2019; 14:30	Puerto Rico	3–2	United States	Callao Sports Center; Referees: Randy Sánchez (MEX), Alejandro Muñoz (CHI)
3 August 2019; 14:30	(22–25, 25–21, 25–22, 20–25, 15–8); P2 P3			Callao Sports Center; Referees: Randy Sánchez (MEX), Alejandro Muñoz (CHI)

=== Women's tournament ===
Group stage

Pos	Team	Pld	W	L	Pts	SW	SL	SR	SPW	SPL	SPR	Qualification
1	Brazil	3	2	1	10	6	3	2.000	215	182	1.181	Semifinals
2	Argentina	3	2	1	9	7	5	1.400	266	256	1.039	Semifinals
3	Puerto Rico	3	1	2	6	5	7	0.714	238	268	0.888	5th–6th place match
4	United States	3	1	2	5	5	8	0.625	259	272	0.952	7th–8th place match

Source: Lima 2019

7 August 2019; 15:00	United States	2–3	Argentina	Callao Sports Center; Referees: Misael Galindo Reyez (COL), Andrew Robb (CAN)
7 August 2019; 15:00	(17–25, 17–25, 25–20, 25–18, 10–15); P2 P3			Callao Sports Center; Referees: Misael Galindo Reyez (COL), Andrew Robb (CAN)

8 August 2019; 15:00	United States	3–2	Puerto Rico	Callao Sports Center; Referees: Jediel de Carvalho (BRA), Rocio Huarcaya (PER)
8 August 2019; 15:00	(25–19, 19–25, 21–25, 25–16, 15–9); P2 P3			Callao Sports Center; Referees: Jediel de Carvalho (BRA), Rocio Huarcaya (PER)

9 August 2019; 13:00	United States	0–3	Brazil	Callao Sports Center
9 August 2019; 13:00	(21–25, 22–25, 17–25); P2 P3			Callao Sports Center

7th place match

10 August 2019; 13:00	Canada	0–3	United States	Callao Sports Center
10 August 2019; 13:00	(16–25, 14–25, 23–25); P2 P3			Callao Sports Center

== Water polo ==
The United States men's and women's water polo teams are automatically qualified for the Pan American Games.

Summary

Team	Event	Group stage				Quarterfinal	Semifinal	Final / BM / Pl.	
Team	Event	Opposition Result	Opposition Result	Opposition Result	Rank	Opposition Result	Opposition Result	Opposition Result	Rank
United States men	Men's tournament	Cuba; W 21–6	Canada; W 13–11	Puerto Rico; W 24–1	1 Q	Peru; W 24–2	Argentina; W 17–1	Canada; W 18–4	1st place, gold medalist(s)
United States women	Women's tournament	Puerto Rico; W 23–3	Brazil; W 20–4	Venezuela; W 23–3	1 Q	Peru; W 21–3	Cuba; W 31–7	Canada; W 24–4	1st place, gold medalist(s)

=== Men's tournament ===
Preliminary round

Pos	Team	Pld	W	D	L	GF	GA	GD	Pts	Qualification
1	United States	3	3	0	0	58	18	+40	6	Quarterfinals
2	Canada	3	2	0	1	51	31	+20	4	Quarterfinals
3	Cuba	3	1	0	2	27	49	−22	2	Quarterfinals
4	Puerto Rico	3	0	0	3	16	54	−38	0	Quarterfinals

Source: Lima 2019
Rules for classification: 1) points; 2) head-to-head points; 3) head-to-head goal difference; 4) head-to-head number of goals scored; 5) goal difference.

4 August 2019; 15:00	Report	Cuba	6–21	United States	Villa María del Truinfo Aquatic Centre, Lima; Referees: Arkadii Voevodin (RUS); Fabio Toffoli (BRA)
4 August 2019; 15:00	Report	Score by quarters: 1–6, 0–5, 5–4, 0–6			Villa María del Truinfo Aquatic Centre, Lima; Referees: Arkadii Voevodin (RUS); Fabio Toffoli (BRA)
4 August 2019; 15:00	Report	Carales, Ponsa 2	Goals	Bowen 5	Villa María del Truinfo Aquatic Centre, Lima; Referees: Arkadii Voevodin (RUS); Fabio Toffoli (BRA)

5 August 2019; 15:00	Report	Canada	11–13	United States	Villa María del Truinfo Aquatic Centre, Lima; Referees: Boris Margeta (SLO); Arkadii Voevodin (RUS)
5 August 2019; 15:00	Report	Score by quarters: 3–4, 1–1, 4–6, 3–2			Villa María del Truinfo Aquatic Centre, Lima; Referees: Boris Margeta (SLO); Arkadii Voevodin (RUS)
5 August 2019; 15:00	Report	Côté 3	Goals	Hooper 5	Villa María del Truinfo Aquatic Centre, Lima; Referees: Boris Margeta (SLO); Arkadii Voevodin (RUS)

6 August 2019; 18:00	Report	United States	24–1	Puerto Rico	Villa María del Truinfo Aquatic Centre, Lima; Referees: Diego Garibaldi (ARG); Daniel Vázquez (MEX)
6 August 2019; 18:00	Report	Score by quarters: 5–0, 5–0, 7–0, 7–1			Villa María del Truinfo Aquatic Centre, Lima; Referees: Diego Garibaldi (ARG); Daniel Vázquez (MEX)
6 August 2019; 18:00	Report	Daube, Vavic 5	Goals	Andino 1	Villa María del Truinfo Aquatic Centre, Lima; Referees: Diego Garibaldi (ARG); Daniel Vázquez (MEX)

Quarterfinal

8 August 2019; 18:00	Report	United States	24–2	Peru	Villa María del Triunfo Aquatic Centre, Lima; Referees: Daniel Daners (URU); Gerardo Arellano (MEX)
8 August 2019; 18:00	Report	Score by quarters: 4–0, 8–2, 6–0, 6–0			Villa María del Triunfo Aquatic Centre, Lima; Referees: Daniel Daners (URU); Gerardo Arellano (MEX)
8 August 2019; 18:00	Report	Bowen, Hallock 4	Goals	Alzamora, Villar 1	Villa María del Triunfo Aquatic Centre, Lima; Referees: Daniel Daners (URU); Gerardo Arellano (MEX)

Semifinal

9 August 2019; 19:30	Report	Argentina	1–17	United States	Villa María del Triunfo Aquatic Centre, Lima; Referees: Gerardo Arellano (MEX); Leonardo González (VEN)
9 August 2019; 19:30	Report	Score by quarters: 0–4, 0–4, 1–6, 0–3			Villa María del Triunfo Aquatic Centre, Lima; Referees: Gerardo Arellano (MEX); Leonardo González (VEN)
9 August 2019; 19:30	Report	Camnasio 1	Goals	Hooper 7	Villa María del Triunfo Aquatic Centre, Lima; Referees: Gerardo Arellano (MEX); Leonardo González (VEN)

Gold medal match

10 August 2019; 19:30	Report	(silver) Canada	6–18	United States (gold)	Villa María del Triunfo Aquatic Centre, Lima; Referees: Boris Margeta (SLO); Arkadii Voevodin (RUS)
10 August 2019; 19:30	Report	Score by quarters: 1–4, 1–6, 1–2, 3–6			Villa María del Triunfo Aquatic Centre, Lima; Referees: Boris Margeta (SLO); Arkadii Voevodin (RUS)
10 August 2019; 19:30	Report	Gardijan 2	Goals	three players 5	Villa María del Triunfo Aquatic Centre, Lima; Referees: Boris Margeta (SLO); Arkadii Voevodin (RUS)

=== Women's tournament ===
Preliminary round

Pos	Team	Pld	W	D	L	GF	GA	GD	Pts	Qualification
1	United States	3	3	0	0	66	10	+56	6	Quarterfinals
2	Brazil	3	2	0	1	31	32	−1	4	Quarterfinals
3	Puerto Rico	3	1	0	2	20	40	−20	2	Quarterfinals
4	Venezuela	3	0	0	3	12	47	−35	0	Quarterfinals

Source: Lima 2019
Rules for classification: 1) points; 2) head-to-head points; 3) head-to-head goal difference; 4) head-to-head number of goals scored; 5) goal difference.

4 August 2019; 11:00	Report	Puerto Rico	3–23	United States	Villa María del Triunfo Aquatic Centre, Lima; Referees: Doriel Terpenka (CAN); Fernando Varela (PER)
4 August 2019; 11:00	Report	Score by quarters: 0-5, 0-6, 2-5, 1-7			Villa María del Triunfo Aquatic Centre, Lima; Referees: Doriel Terpenka (CAN); Fernando Varela (PER)
4 August 2019; 11:00	Report	three players 1	Goals	Haralabidis 6	Villa María del Triunfo Aquatic Centre, Lima; Referees: Doriel Terpenka (CAN); Fernando Varela (PER)

5 August 2019; 11:00	Report	Brazil	4–20	United States	Villa María del Triunfo Aquatic Centre, Lima; Referees: Nestor Torres (PER); Daniel Vázquez (MEX)
5 August 2019; 11:00	Report	Score by quarters: 1-3, 1–3, 2-7, 0-7			Villa María del Triunfo Aquatic Centre, Lima; Referees: Nestor Torres (PER); Daniel Vázquez (MEX)
5 August 2019; 11:00	Report	four players 1	Goals	Fischer 4	Villa María del Triunfo Aquatic Centre, Lima; Referees: Nestor Torres (PER); Daniel Vázquez (MEX)

6 August 2019; 11:00	Report	Venezuela	3–23	United States	Villa María del Triunfo Aquatic Centre, Lima; Referees: Nestor Torres (PER); Doriel Terpenka (CAN)
6 August 2019; 11:00	Report	Score by quarters: 0-11, 0-5, 1-4, 2-3			Villa María del Triunfo Aquatic Centre, Lima; Referees: Nestor Torres (PER); Doriel Terpenka (CAN)
6 August 2019; 11:00	Report	Torres 2	Goals	four players 3	Villa María del Triunfo Aquatic Centre, Lima; Referees: Nestor Torres (PER); Doriel Terpenka (CAN)

Quarterfinal

8 August 2019; 11:00	Report	United States	21–3	Peru	VMT Aquatic Centre, Lima; Referees: Marcus Paulo Gresele (BRA); Leonardo González Toledo (VEN)
8 August 2019; 11:00	Report	Score by quarters: 5–1, 6–1, 6–0, 4–1			VMT Aquatic Centre, Lima; Referees: Marcus Paulo Gresele (BRA); Leonardo González Toledo (VEN)

Semifinal

9 August 2019; 12:30	Report	Cuba	7–31	United States	VMT Aquatic Centre, Lima; Referees: Daniel Federico Daners (URU); Néstor Ricardo Guerra Torres (PER)
9 August 2019; 12:30	Report	Score by quarters: 2–9, 3–5, 0–11, 2–6			VMT Aquatic Centre, Lima; Referees: Daniel Federico Daners (URU); Néstor Ricardo Guerra Torres (PER)

Gold medal match

10 August 2019; 12:30	Report	(silver) Canada	4–24	United States (gold)	VMT Aquatic Centre, Lima; Referees: Daniel Rodrigo Vázquez (MEX); Fernado Varela Llanos (PER)
10 August 2019; 12:30	Report	Score by quarters: 1–6, 2–7, 1–10, 0–1			VMT Aquatic Centre, Lima; Referees: Daniel Rodrigo Vázquez (MEX); Fernado Varela Llanos (PER)
10 August 2019; 12:30	Report	four players 1	Goals	M. Fischer 6	VMT Aquatic Centre, Lima; Referees: Daniel Rodrigo Vázquez (MEX); Fernado Varela Llanos (PER)

== Water skiing ==
The United States qualified four water skiers (two of each gender) and two wakeboarders (one of each gender).

Water skiing

Men

Athlete	Event	Preliminary		Final				
Athlete	Event	Score	Rank	Slalom	Jump	Tricks	Total	Rank
Taylor Garcia	Slalom	3.50/58/10.25	3 Q	3.00/58/10.75	—N/a		3.00/58/10.75	=5
Adam Pickos	Slalom	1.00/58/10.75	2	did not advance				
Taylor Garcia	Jump	214	1 Q	—N/a	214	—N/a	214	1st place, gold medalist(s)
Taylor Garcia	Tricks	4190	11	did not advance				
Adam Pickos	Tricks	10720	2 Q	—N/a		10140	10140	3rd place, bronze medalist(s)
Taylor Garcia	Overall	2361.83	4 Q	1.50/58/11.25	0	0	852.94	6

Women

Athlete	Event	Preliminary		Final				
Athlete	Event	Score	Rank	Slalom	Jump	Tricks	Total	Rank
Regina Jaquess	Slalom	1.00/55/10.25	1 Q	3.00/55/10.25	—N/a		3.00/55/10.25	1st place, gold medalist(s)
Erika Lang	Slalom	5.00/55/12.00	1 Q	2.00/55/12.00	—N/a		2.00/55/12.00	6
Regina Jaquess	Jump	173	1 Q	—N/a	171	—N/a	171	1st place, gold medalist(s)
Regina Jaquess	Tricks	9420	1 Q	—N/a		7790	7790	5
Erika Lang	Tricks	8340	4 Q	—N/a		9720	9720	2nd place, silver medalist(s)
Regina Jaquess	Overall	2902.60	1 Q	1.50/55/10.25	7890	169	2978.91	1st place, gold medalist(s)

Wakeboarding

Athlete	Event	Semifinal		Last chance qualifier		Final	
Athlete	Event	Score	Rank	Score	Rank	Score	Rank
Andrew Adkison	Men's	76.67	3	64.78	1 Q	79.33	1st place, gold medalist(s)
Mary Howell	Women's	71.22	1 Q	Bye		79.78	2nd place, silver medalist(s)

== Weightlifting ==
The United States qualified ten weightlifters (four man and six women).

Men

Athlete	Event	Snatch		Clean & jerk		Total	
Athlete	Event	Weight	Rank	Weight	Rank	Weight	Rank
Harrison Maurus	–81 kg	155	3	195	3	350	3rd place, bronze medalist(s)
Christian Rodriguez	–81 kg	152	4	175	4	327	4
Nathan Damron	–96 kg	160	=7	195	=6	355	8
Wesley Kitts	–109 kg	172	4	217	1	389	1st place, gold medalist(s)

Women

Athlete	Event	Snatch		Clearn & jerk		Total	
Athlete	Event	Weight	Rank	Weight	Rank	Weight	Rank
Jourdan Delacruz	–55 kg	88	4	109	5	197	4
Hunter Elam	–59 kg	93	=6	112	6	205	6
Jessica Lucero	–59 kg	93	=6	110	8	203	8
Mattie Sasser	–64 kg	102	3	130	=1	232	2nd place, silver medalist(s)
Katherine Nye	–76 kg	108	3	135	=3	243	3rd place, bronze medalist(s)
Sarah Robles	+87 kg	125	2	159	1	284	1st place, gold medalist(s)

== Wrestling ==
Key:
- VT – Victory by fall.
- PP – Decision by points – the loser with technical points.
- PO – Decision by points – the loser without technical points.
- SP – Technical superiority – the loser with technical points and a margin of victory of at least 9 (Greco-Roman) or 10 (freestyle) points.
- ST – Great superiority – the loser without technical points and a margin of victory of at least 8 (Greco-Roman) or 10 (freestyle) points.
- VA – Decision by withdrawal

Men

Athlete	Event	Round of 16	Quarterfinal	Semifinal	Repechage	Final / BM	
Athlete	Event	Opposition Result	Opposition Result	Opposition Result	Opposition Result	Opposition Result	Rank
Daton Fix	Freestyle 57 kg	—N/a	Alves (BRA); W 4–0ST	Andreu (CUB); W 3–1^{PP}	—N/a	Ramírez (DOM); W 4–0ST	1st place, gold medalist(s)
Jaydin Eierman	Freestyle 65 kg	—N/a	Valdés (CUB); L 0–4ST	Did not advance	—N/a	Bronze medal final Destribats (ARG); W 4–1^{SP}	3rd place, bronze medalist(s)
Jordan Burroughs	Freestyle 74 kg	—N/a	Herrera (PER); W 4–0ST	Garzón (CUB); W 4–1^{SP}	—N/a	Gómez (PUR); W 3–1^{PP}	1st place, gold medalist(s)
Pat Downey	Freestyle 86 kg	Bye	Arthur (JAM); W 4–1^{SP}	Torreblanca (CUB); L 1–3^{PP}	Bye	Bronze medal final Moore (CAN); W 5–0^{VT}	3rd place, bronze medalist(s)
Kyle Snyder	Freestyle 97 kg	—N/a	Ramos (PUR); W 4–0ST	Salas (CUB); W 3–1^{PP}	—N/a	Díaz (VEN); W 3–1^{PP}	1st place, gold medalist(s)
Nick Gwiazdowski	Freestyle 125 kg	—N/a	Gunning (PER); W 4–0ST	Jarvis (CAN); W 4–0ST	—N/a	Pino (CUB); W 4–0ST	1st place, gold medalist(s)
Ildar Hafizov	Greco-Roman 60 kg	—N/a	Toro (ECU); L 1–3^{PP}	Did not advance	—N/a	Bronze medal final Perez (MEX); W 3–1^{PP}	3rd place, bronze medalist(s)
Ellis Coleman	Greco-Roman 67 kg	—N/a	Brito (BRA); W 5–0^{VT}	Borrero (CUB); L 0–4ST	—N/a	Bronze medal final León (DOM); W 5–0^{VT}	3rd place, bronze medalist(s)
Pat Smith	Greco-Roman 77 kg	Bye	Cuero (COL); W 3–1^{PP}	Benitez (MEX); W 3–1^{PP}	—N/a	Rivas (VEN); W 3–1^{PP}	1st place, gold medalist(s)
Joe Rau	Greco-Roman 87 kg	Cardenas (PER); W 3–1^{PP}	Avendaño (VEN); L 0–4ST	Did not advance	—N/a	Bronze medal final Gregorich (CUB); L 1–3^{PP}	5
G'Angelo Hancock	Greco-Roman 97 kg	—N/a	Barreiro (CAN); W 4–0ST	Mejia (HON); W 4–0ST	—N/a	Rosillo (CUB); L 1–3^{PP}	2nd place, silver medalist(s)
Adam Coon	Greco-Roman 130 kg	—N/a	Acosta (CHI); L 0–4ST	Did not advance	—N/a	did not advance	

Women

Athlete	Event	Round of 16	Quarterfinal	Semifinal	Final / BM	
Athlete	Event	Opposition Result	Opposition Result	Opposition Result	Opposition Result	Rank
Whitney Conder	50 kg	—N/a	Castillo (COL); W 3–0^{PO}	Barbosa (BRA); W 4–0ST	Guzmán (CUB); W 3–1^{PP}	1st place, gold medalist(s)
Sarah Hildebrandt	53 kg	—N/a	Valverde (ECU); W 3–0^{PO}	Parsons (CAN); W 4–0ST	Arguello (VEN); W 4–0ST	1st place, gold medalist(s)
Jenna Burkert	57 kg	Bye	Ramirez (NCA); W 4–0ST	Penalber (BRA); W 4–0ST	Antes (ECU); L 1–3^{PP}	2nd place, silver medalist(s)
Kayla Miracle	62 kg	—N/a	Nunes (BRA); W 5–0^{VT}	Griman (VEN); W 5–0^{VT}	Rentería (COL); W 4–0ST	1st place, gold medalist(s)
Tamyra Mensah-Stock	68 kg	—N/a	Sovero (PER); W 4–0ST	Garnica (MEX); W 5–0^{VT}	Di Bacco (CAN); W 5–0^{VT}	1st place, gold medalist(s)

== See also ==
- United States at the 2019 Parapan American Games
- United States at the 2020 Summer Olympics
