= 2021–22 Villanova Wildcats men's basketball team =

2021–22 Villanova Wildcats men's basketball

Philadelphia Big 5 champions Big East tournament champions

NCAA tournament, Final Four
- Conference: Big East Conference

Ranking
- Coaches: No. 4
- AP: No. 6
- Record: 30–8 (16–4 Big East)
- Head coach: Jay Wright (21st season)
- Assistant coaches: George Halcovage; Mike Nardi; Dwayne Anderson
- Home arena: Finneran Pavilion (Capacity: 6,501); Wells Fargo Center (Capacity: 20,478)

2021–22 Big East men's basketball standings
	Conf.				Overall
Team	W		L	PCT	W		L	PCT
No. 13 Providence	14	–	3	.824	27	–	6	.818
No. 6 Villanova †	16	–	4	.800	30	–	8	.789
No. 21 UConn	13	–	6	.684	23	–	10	.697
Creighton	12	–	7	.632	23	–	12	.657
Seton Hall	11	–	8	.579	21	–	11	.656
Marquette	11	–	8	.579	19	–	13	.594
Xavier	8	–	11	.421	23	–	13	.639
St. John's	8	–	11	.421	17	–	15	.531
Butler	6	–	14	.300	14	–	19	.424
DePaul	6	–	14	.300	15	–	16	.484
Georgetown	0	–	19	.000	6	–	25	.194
† 2022 Big East tournament winner Rankings from AP poll

The 2021–22 Villanova Wildcats men's basketball team represented Villanova University in the 2021–22 NCAA Division I men's basketball season. Led by head coach Jay Wright in his 21st and final year of coaching, the Wildcats played their home games at the Finneran Pavilion on the school's campus in the Philadelphia suburb of Villanova, Pennsylvania and Wells Fargo Center as members of the Big East Conference. They finished the season 30–8, 16–4 in Big East play to finish in second place. They defeated St. John's, UConn, and Creighton to win the Big East tournament championship. As a result, they received the conference's automatic bid to the NCAA tournament as the No. 2 seed in the South region. They defeated Delaware, Ohio State, Michigan, and Houston to advance to the Final Four. There they lost to eventual national champion Kansas.

On April 20, 2022, head coach Jay Wright announced he was retiring effective immediately. Former Wright assistant and Fordham head coach Kyle Neptune was named the new head coach.

== Previous season ==
In a season limited due to the ongoing COVID-19 pandemic, the Wildcats finished the 2020–21 season 18–7 overall and 11–4 in Big East play to finish first place in the conference. As the No. 1 seed in the Big East tournament, they lost in the quarterfinals 72–71 to eventual conference tournament champions Georgetown. In the NCAA tournament, the Wildcats received the 5 seed in the South Regional. They defeated Winthrop and North Texas to reach the Sweet 16, where they fell to eventual tournament champions Baylor 62–51. Villanova finished #11 in the final Coaches Poll.

== Offseason ==
=== Departures ===
Name	Number	Pos.	Height	Weight	Year	Hometown	Notes
Jeremiah Robinson-Earl	24	F	6'9"	230	Sophomore	Kansas City, KS	Declared for the 2021 NBA draft; selected 32nd overall by the Knicks, then traded to the Thunder.
Cole Swider	10	F	6'9"	225	Junior	Portsmouth, RI	Transferred to Syracuse
Kevin Hoehn	20	G	6'0"	175	Senior	Morristown, NJ	Graduated

=== 2021 recruiting class ===
College recruiting information
Name	Hometown	School	Height	Weight	Commit date
Jordan Longino; SG	Fort Washington, PA	Germantown Academy	6 ft 5 in (1.96 m)	195 lb (88 kg)	Jul 23, 2020
Jordan Longino; SG	Recruit ratings: Scout: Rivals: 247Sports: ESPN:				
Nnanna Njoku; C	Hockessin, Delaware	Sanford School	6 ft 9 in (2.06 m)	245 lb (111 kg)	Apr 19, 2020
Nnanna Njoku; C	Recruit ratings: Scout: Rivals: 247Sports: ESPN:				
Angelo Brizzi; PG	Warrenton, VA	Highland School	6 ft 3 in (1.91 m)	170 lb (77 kg)	Jul 27, 2020
Angelo Brizzi; PG	Recruit ratings: Scout: Rivals: 247Sports: ESPN:				
Overall recruit ranking:
Note: In many cases, Scout, Rivals, 247Sports, On3, and ESPN may conflict in their listings of height and weight.; In these cases, the average was taken. ESPN grades are on a 100-point scale.; Sources: "2021 Villanova Commits". Rivals.; "2021 Team Ranking". Rivals.

=== Coaching changes ===
Following the 2020–21 season, longtime assistant coach Kyle Neptune left the Wildcats to become the head coach at Fordham. Wright subsequently promoted George Halcovage to Associate Head Coach and Dwayne Anderson from Director of Basketball Operations to Assistant Coach. Mike Nardi remained in his Assistant Coach position.

== Roster ==
2021–22 Villanova Wildcats men's basketball team
Players
Coaches

Pos.	#	Name	Height	Weight	Year	Previous school	Hometown
G	1	Bryan Antoine	6 ft 5 in (1.96 m)	180 lb (82 kg)	Jr	Ranney School	Tinton Falls, NJ
G	2	Collin Gillespie (C)	6 ft 3 in (1.91 m)	195 lb (88 kg)	GS	Archbishop Wood HS	Huntingdon Valley, PA
F	3	Brandon Slater	6 ft 7 in (2.01 m)	220 lb (100 kg)	Sr	Paul VI Catholic HS	Centerville, VA
G	4	Chris Arcidiacono	6 ft 5 in (1.96 m)	200 lb (91 kg)	Jr	Perkiomen School	Langhorne, PA
G	5	Justin Moore	6 ft 4 in (1.93 m)	210 lb (95 kg)	Jr	DeMatha Catholic HS	Fort Washington, MD
G	10	Angelo Brizzi	6 ft 3 in (1.91 m)	180 lb (82 kg)	Fr	Highland School	Warrenton, VA
G	12	Kevin Voigt (W)	6 ft 5 in (1.96 m)	210 lb (95 kg)	Sr	Massapequa HS	Massapequa, NY
F	13	Trey Patterson	6 ft 9 in (2.06 m)	220 lb (100 kg)	RS Fr	Rutgers Prep	Somerset, NJ
G	14	Caleb Daniels	6 ft 4 in (1.93 m)	210 lb (95 kg)	RS Sr	Tulane	New Orleans, LA
G	15	Jordan Longino	6 ft 5 in (1.96 m)	220 lb (100 kg)	Fr	Germantown Academy	Doylestown, PA
F	21	Dhamir Cosby-Roundtree	6 ft 9 in (2.06 m)	250 lb (113 kg)	GS	Neumann–Goretti Catholic HS	Philadelphia, PA
F	22	Nnanna Njoku	6 ft 9 in (2.06 m)	260 lb (118 kg)	Fr	Sanford School	Newark, DE
F	23	Jermaine Samuels	6 ft 7 in (2.01 m)	230 lb (104 kg)	GS	The Rivers School	Franklin, MA
F	43	Eric Dixon	6 ft 8 in (2.03 m)	255 lb (116 kg)	RS So	Abington HS	Willow Grove, PA

Head coach

- Jay Wright (Bucknell)

Assistant coach(es)

- George Halcovage (Babson)
- Mike Nardi (Villanova)
- Dwayne Anderson (Villanova)

Legend

- (C) Team captain
- (S) Suspended
- (I) Ineligible
- (W) Walk-on
- Injured
- Current redshirt

Roster
Last update: July 8, 2021

== Schedule and results ==
Date time, TV	Rank^{#}	Opponent^{#}	Result	Record	High points	High rebounds	High assists	Site (attendance) city, state
Regular season
November 9, 2021*; 4:30 p.m., FS1	No. 4	Mount St. Mary's	W 91–51	1–0	27 – Moore	6 – Samuels	7 – Moore	Finneran Pavilion (6,501); Villanova, PA
November 12, 2021*; 11:30 p.m., ESPN2	No. 4	at No. 2 UCLA	L 77–86 ^{OT}	1–1	20 – Samuels	9 – Dixon	3 – Tied	Pauley Pavilion (13,659); Los Angeles, CA
November 16, 2021*; 6:30 p.m., FS2	No. 5	Howard	W 100–81	2–1	23 – Slater	7 – Dixon	4 – Tied	Finneran Pavilion (6,501); Villanova, PA
November 20, 2021*; 1:00 p.m., ESPNews	No. 5	vs. No. 17 Tennessee; Hall of Fame Tip Off semifinal	W 71–53	3–1	14 – Tied	11 – Samuels	6 – Moore	Mohegan Sun Arena; Uncasville, CT
November 21, 2021*; 1:00 p.m., ABC	No. 5	vs. No. 6 Purdue; Hall of Fame Tip Off Championship	L 74–80	3–2	19 – Moore	5 – Samuels	5 – Gillespie	Mohegan Sun Arena (9,100); Uncasville, CT
November 28, 2021*; 6:00 p.m., ESPN2	No. 7	vs. La Salle; Philadelphia Big 5	W 72–46	4–2	13 – Gillespie	8 – Dixon	5 – Gillespie	The Palestra (5,841); Philadelphia, PA
December 1, 2021*; 7:00 p.m., ESPN+	No. 6	at Penn; Philadelphia Big 5	W 71–56	5–2	26 – Gillespie	11 – Moore	3 – Daniels	The Palestra (6,255); Philadelphia, PA
December 4, 2021*; 12:00 p.m., FS1	No. 6	Saint Joseph's; Holy War / Philadelphia Big 5	W 81–52	6–2	23 – Gillespie	7 – Moore	4 – Moore	Finneran Pavilion (6,501); Villanova, PA
December 7, 2021*; 10:01 p.m., ESPN	No. 6	vs. Syracuse; Jimmy V Classic	W 67–53	7–2	18 – Moore	9 – Samuels	5 – Gillespie	Madison Square Garden (14,344); New York, NY
December 12, 2021*; 3:00 p.m., ABC	No. 6	at No. 2 Baylor; Big East–Big 12 Battle	L 36–57	7–3	15 – Moore	8 – Samuels	1 – Tied	Ferrell Center (10,264); Waco, TX
December 17, 2021; 8:00 p.m., FS1	No. 9	at Creighton	L 59–79	7–4 (0–1)	16 – Gillespie	9 – Dixon	2 – Gillespie	CHI Health Center Omaha (17,208); Omaha, NE
December 21, 2021; 7:00 p.m., FS1	No. 23	No. 18 Xavier	W 71–58	8–4 (1–1)	17 – Moore	8 – Dixon	4 – Tied	Finneran Pavilion (6,501); Villanova, PA
December 29, 2021*; 9:00 p.m., FS1	No. 22	Temple; Philadelphia Big 5	Canceled due to COVID-19 protocols on Temple's team					Finneran Pavilion; Villanova, PA
January 1, 2022; 2:00 p.m., CBS	No. 22	at No. 15 Seton Hall	W 73–67	9–4 (2–1)	21 – Gillespie	11 – Samuels	3 – Samuels	Prudential Center (13,625); Newark, NJ
January 5, 2022; 8:30 p.m., FS1	No. 19	Creighton	W 75–41	10–4 (3–1)	22 – Moore	7 – Samuels	5 – Gillespie	Finneran Pavilion (6,501); Villanova, PA
January 8, 2022; 5:00 p.m., FOX	No. 19	at DePaul	W 79–64	11–4 (4–1)	29 – Gillespie	7 – Moore	4 – Gillespie	Wintrust Arena (3,839); Chicago, IL
January 12, 2022; 6:30 p.m., FS1	No. 14	at No. 17 Xavier	W 64–60	12–4 (5–1)	21 – Gillespie	10 – Dixon	2 – Tied	Cintas Center (10,224); Cincinnati, OH
January 16, 2022; 12:00 p.m., FS1	No. 14	Butler	W 82–42	13–4 (6–1)	17 – Gillespie	7 – Moore	5 – Moore	Wells Fargo Center (17,009); Philadelphia, PA
January 19, 2022; 8:00 p.m., CBSSN	No. 11	Marquette	L 54–57	13–5 (6–2)	15 – Dixon	10 – Samuels	4 – Gillespie	Finneran Pavilion (6,501); Villanova, PA
January 22, 2022; 12:05 p.m., FOX	No. 11	at Georgetown	W 85–74	14–5 (7–2)	28 – Gillespie	8 – Dixon	2 – Tied	Capital One Arena (11,872); Washington, D.C.
January 25, 2022; 5:00 p.m., FS1	No. 14	DePaul	W 67–43	15–5 (8–2)	16 – Moore	10 – Dixon	2 – 3 Tied	Finneran Pavilion (6,501); Villanova, PA
January 29, 2022; 4:30 p.m., FOX	No. 14	St. John's	W 73–62	16–5 (9–2)	17 – Gillespie	7 – Tied	4 – Moore	Finneran Pavilion (6,501); Villanova, PA
February 2, 2022; 10:00 p.m., FS1	No. 12	at No. 24 Marquette	L 73–83	16–6 (9–3)	18 – Slater	6 – Tied	5 – Moore	Fiserv Forum (12,782); Milwaukee, WI
February 5, 2022; 12:00 p.m., FOX	No. 12	No. 17 UConn	W 85–74	17–6 (10–3)	24 – Dixon	12 – Dixon	5 – Samuels	Wells Fargo Center (19,786); Philadelphia, PA
February 8, 2022; 8:30 p.m., FS1	No. 15	at St. John's	W 75–69	18–6 (11–3)	16 – Tied	10 – Gillespie	3 – Tied	Madison Square Garden (9,712); New York, NY
February 12, 2022; 1:00 p.m., FOX	No. 15	Seton Hall	W 73–67	19–6 (12–3)	16 – Tied	7 – Moore	4 – Gillespie	Wells Fargo Center (17,803); Philadelphia, PA
February 15, 2022; 8:00 p.m., CBSSN	No. 10	at No. 8 Providence	W 89–84	20–6 (13–3)	33 – Gillespie	10 – Moore	3 – Tied	Dunkin' Donuts Center (12,636); Providence, RI
February 19, 2022; 5:00 p.m., FOX	No. 10	Georgetown	W 74–66	21–6 (14–3)	19 – Moore	10 – Gillespie	8 – Samuels	Finneran Pavilion (6,501); Villanova, PA
February 22, 2022; 8:00 p.m., FS1	No. 8	at No. 21 UConn	L 69–71	21–7 (14–4)	17 – Gillespie	6 – Dixon	4 – Gillespie	XL Center (15,564); Hartford, CT
March 1, 2022; 6:30 p.m., FS1	No. 11	No. 9 Providence	W 76–74	22–7 (15–4)	20 – Daniels	6 – Moore	5 – Gillespie	Finneran Pavilion (6,501); Villanova, PA
March 5, 2022; 12:00 p.m., FOX	No. 11	at Butler	W 78–59	23–7 (16–4)	16 – Moore	7 – Longino	4 – Gillespie	Hinkle Fieldhouse (8,163); Indianapolis, IN
Big East tournament
March 10, 2022; 7:00 p.m., FS1	(2) No. 8	vs. (7) St. John's; Quarterfinal	W 66–65	24–7	19 – Daniels	9 – Dixon	3 – Gillespie	Madison Square Garden (19,812); New York, NY
March 11, 2022; 9:00 p.m., FS1	(2) No. 8	vs. (3) No. 20 UConn; Semifinal	W 63–60	25–7	21 – Samuels	12 – Samuels	10 – Gillespie	Madison Square Garden (19,812); New York, NY
March 12, 2022; 6:30 p.m., FOX	(2) No. 8	vs. (4) Creighton; Championship	W 54–48	26–7	17 – Gillespie	8 – Samuels	5 – Gillespie	Madison Square Garden (19,812); New York, NY
NCAA tournament
March 18, 2022; 2:45 p.m., CBS	(2 S) No. 6	vs. (15 S) Delaware; First round	W 80–60	27–7	21 – Moore	9 – Samuels	6 – Moore	PPG Paints Arena (18,738); Pittsburgh, PA
March 20, 2022; 2:40 p.m., CBS	(2 S) No. 6	vs. (7 S) Ohio State; Second round	W 71–61	28–7	20 – Gillespie	8 – Tied	4 – Gillespie	PPG Paints Arena (18,506); Pittsburgh, PA
March 24, 2022; 7:29 p.m., TBS	(2 S) No. 6	vs. (11 S) Michigan; Sweet Sixteen	W 63–55	29–7	22 – Samuels	9 – Daniels	4 – Moore	AT&T Center (17,357); San Antonio, TX
March 26, 2022; 6:09 p.m., TBS	(2 S) No. 6	vs. (5 S) No. 15 Houston; Elite Eight	W 50–44	30–7	16 – Samuels	10 – Samuels	2 – Tied	AT&T Center (17,186); San Antonio, TX
April 2, 2022; 6:09 p.m., TBS	(2 S) No. 6	vs. (1 MW) No. 3 Kansas; Final Four	L 65–81	30–8	17 – Gillespie	8 – Slater	3 – Tied	Caesars Superdome (70,602); New Orleans, LA
*Non-conference game. ^{#}Rankings from AP Poll. (#) Tournament seedings in parentheses. All times are in Eastern Time.

== Rankings ==
Ranking movements Legend: ██ Increase in ranking ██ Decrease in ranking
	Week																			
Poll	Pre	1	2	3	4	5	6	7	8	9	10	11	12	13	14	15	16	17	18	Final
AP	4	5	7	6	6	9	23	22	19	14	11	14	12	15	10	8	11	8	6	Not released
Coaches	4	5*	7	6	6	10	22	22	15	14	11	12	12	15	10	8	11	8	5	4

*Coaches did not release a week 1 poll.

== Awards and honors ==
=== Big East Conference honors ===
==== All-Big East Awards ====
- Player of the Year: Collin Gillespie
- Scholar-Athlete of the Year: Collin Gillespie

==== All-Big East First Team ====
- Collin Gillespie

==== All-Big East Second Team ====
- Justin Moore

=== National awards ===
- Bob Cousy Award: Collin Gillespie
- Third Team All-American: Collin Gillespie (AP, NABC, Sporting News, USBWA)
