= 2020–21 Villanova Wildcats men's basketball team =

American college basketball season

2020–21 Villanova Wildcats men's basketball

2K Empire Classic champions Big East regular season champions

NCAA tournament, Sweet Sixteen
- Conference: Big East Conference

Ranking
- Coaches: No. 11
- AP: No. 18
- Record: 18–7 (11–4 Big East)
- Head coach: Jay Wright (20th season)
- Assistant coaches: Kyle Neptune; George Halcovage; Mike Nardi
- Home arena: Finneran Pavilion

2020–21 Big East men's basketball standings
	Conf.				Overall
Team	W		L	PCT	W		L	PCT
No. 18 Villanova	11	–	4	.733	18	–	7	.720
No. 19 Creighton	14	–	6	.700	22	–	9	.710
UConn	11	–	6	.647	15	–	8	.652
St. John's	10	–	9	.526	16	–	11	.593
Seton Hall	10	–	9	.526	14	–	13	.519
Providence	9	–	10	.474	13	–	13	.500
Xavier	6	–	7	.462	13	–	8	.619
Georgetown †	7	–	9	.438	13	–	13	.500
Marquette	8	–	11	.421	13	–	14	.481
Butler	8	–	12	.400	10	–	15	.400
DePaul	2	–	13	.133	5	–	14	.263
† 2021 Big East tournament winner Rankings from AP poll

The 2020–21 Villanova Wildcats men's basketball team represented Villanova University in the 2020–21 NCAA Division I men's basketball season. Led by head coach Jay Wright in his 20th year, the Wildcats played their home games at the Finneran Pavilion on the school's campus in the Philadelphia suburb of Villanova, Pennsylvania. However, they did not play at Wells Fargo Center due to the COVID-19 pandemic. They are members of the Big East Conference. They finished the season 18–7, 11–4 in Big East Play to finish as regular season champions. However, star guard Collin Gillespie suffered a season-ending MCL tear with a single game left in the regular season and were upset in the quarterfinals of the Big East tournament by Georgetown. They received an at-large bid to the NCAA tournament where they defeated Winthrop and North Texas, despite the loss of Gillespie and Justin Moore in the first-round game, to advance to the Sweet Sixteen where they lost to the eventual champions Baylor.

== Previous season ==
The Wildcats finished the 2019–20 season 24–7, 13–5 in Big East play to finish tied for first place. As the No. 2 seed in the Big East tournament, they were slated to play DePaul in the quarterfinals, but the Tournament was cancelled at halftime of the first game of the quarterfinals due to the COVID-19 pandemic, along with the rest of the NCAA postseason.

== Offseason ==
=== Departures ===
Name	Number	Pos.	Height	Weight	Year	Hometown	Notes
Tim Saunders	12	G	6'4"	200	Senior	Del Mar, CA	Graduated
Saddiq Bey	41	F	6'8"	216	Sophomore	Largo, MD	Declared for the 2020 NBA draft; selected 19th overall by the Brooklyn Nets

== Preseason ==
The Wildcats were picked to win the Big East Conference in the coaches' poll, receiving nine first-place votes and a total of 99 points. Collin Gillespie and Jeremiah Robinson-Earl were selected to the Preseason First Team All-Big East, while Justin Moore was selected to the Preseason Second Team All-Big East. Villanova was considered one of the favorites to win a national title after returning most of its roster from the previous season, and was ranked third in the preseason Associated Press poll.

== Roster ==
2020–21 Villanova Wildcats men's basketball team
Players
Coaches

Pos.	#	Name	Height	Weight	Year	Previous school	Hometown
G	1	Bryan Antoine	6 ft 5 in (1.96 m)	180 lb (82 kg)	So	Ranney School	Tinton Falls, NJ
G	2	Collin Gillespie (injured)	6 ft 3 in (1.91 m)	190 lb (86 kg)	Sr	Archbishop Wood HS	Huntingdon Valley, PA
F	3	Brandon Slater	6 ft 6 in (1.98 m)	211 lb (96 kg)	Jr	Paul VI Catholic HS	Centerville, VA
G	4	Chris Arcidiacono	6 ft 5 in (1.96 m)	196 lb (89 kg)	So	Perkiomen School	Langhorne, PA
G	5	Justin Moore	6 ft 4 in (1.93 m)	210 lb (95 kg)	So	DeMatha Catholic HS	Fort Washington, MD
F	10	Cole Swider	6 ft 9 in (2.06 m)	225 lb (102 kg)	Jr	St. Andrews School	Portsmouth, RI
F	12	Trey Patterson	6 ft 8 in (2.03 m)	210 lb (95 kg)	Fr	Rutgers Preparatory School	Somerset, NJ
G	13	Kevin Voigt (W)	6 ft 5 in (1.96 m)	193 lb (88 kg)	Jr	Massapequa HS	Massapequa, NY
G	14	Caleb Daniels	6 ft 4 in (1.93 m)	210 lb (95 kg)	RS Jr	St. Augustine HS; Tulane	New Orleans, LA
G	20	Kevin Hoehn (W)	6 ft 0 in (1.83 m)	175 lb (79 kg)	Sr	Morristown HS	Morristown, NJ
F	21	Dhamir Cosby-Roundtree	6 ft 9 in (2.06 m)	235 lb (107 kg)	Sr	Neumann–Goretti Catholic HS	Philadelphia, PA
F	23	Jermaine Samuels	6 ft 7 in (2.01 m)	230 lb (104 kg)	Sr	The Rivers School	Franklin, MA
F	24	Jeremiah Robinson-Earl	6 ft 9 in (2.06 m)	230 lb (104 kg)	So	IMG Academy	Kansas City, KS
F	43	Eric Dixon	6 ft 8 in (2.03 m)	260 lb (118 kg)	RS Fr	Abington HS	Willow Grove, PA

Head coach

- Jay Wright (Bucknell)

Assistant coach(es)

- Kyle Neptune (Lehigh)
- George Halcovage (Babson)
- Mike Nardi (Villanova)

Legend

- (C) Team captain
- (S) Suspended
- (I) Ineligible
- (W) Walk-on
- Injured
- Current redshirt

Roster
Last update: November 27, 2020

== Schedule and results ==
Date time, TV	Rank^{#}	Opponent^{#}	Result	Record	High points	High rebounds	High assists	Site (attendance) city, state
Regular season
November 25, 2020*; 9:30 pm, ESPN	No. 3	vs. Boston College; 2K Empire Classic semifinal	W 76–67	1–0	18 – Robinson-Earl	10 – Robinson-Earl	7 – Gillespie	Mohegan Sun Arena (0); Uncasville, CT
November 26, 2020*; 9:30 pm, ESPN	No. 3	vs. No. 18 Arizona State; 2K Empire Classic championship	W 83–74	2–0	28 – Robinson-Earl	12 – Moore	4 – Daniels	Mohegan Sun Arena (0); Uncasville, CT
November 28, 2020*; 8:00 p.m., ESPNU	No. 3	vs. Virginia Tech; Hall of Fame Tip Off	L 73–81 ^{OT}	2–1	25 – Gillespie	9 – Robinson-Earl	4 – Gillespie	Mohegan Sun Arena (0); Uncasville, CT
November 30, 2020*		Saint Joseph's; Postponed due to COVID-19 issues; rescheduled for December 19						Finneran Pavilion; Villanova, PA
December 1, 2020*; 5:30 p.m., ESPN2	No. 12	vs. Hartford; Bubbleville	W 87–53	3–1	15 – Moore	10 – Tied	5 – Moore	Mohegan Sun Arena (0); Uncasville, CT
December 3, 2020*		Temple; Canceled due to COVID-19 issues						Finneran Pavilion; Villanova, PA
December 6, 2020*; 1:00 p.m., ESPN	No. 12	at No. 17 Texas; Big East/Big 12 Battle	W 68–64	4–1	19 – Tied	12 – Samuels	3 – Tied	Frank Erwin Center (2,506); Austin, TX
December 11, 2020; 5:00 p.m., FS1	No. 9	at Georgetown	W 76–63	5–1 (1–0)	18 – Tied	8 – Moore	6 – Tied	Capital One Arena (0); Washington, DC
December 14, 2020; 7:00 p.m., FS1	No. 7	DePaul; Postponed due to COVID-19 issues; rescheduled for February 9						Finneran Pavilion; Villanova, PA
December 16, 2020; 7:00 p.m., FS1	No. 7	Butler	W 85–66	6–1 (2–0)	18 – Tied	6 – Samuels	5 – Gillespie	Finneran Pavilion (0); Villanova, PA
December 19, 2020*; 9:00 pm, FS1	No. 7	Saint Joseph's	W 88–68	7–1	25 – Robinson-Earl	8 – Samuels	6 – Robinson-Earl	Finneran Pavilion (0); Villanova, PA
December 23, 2020; 7:00 p.m., FS1	No. 5	at Marquette	W 85–68	8–1 (3–0)	22 – Gillespie	7 – Robinson-Earl	5 – Daniels	Fiserv Forum (0); Milwaukee, WI
January 2, 2021; 2:00 p.m., FS1	No. 4	at Xavier; Postponed due to COVID-19 issues; rescheduled for January 13						Cintas Center; Cincinnati, OH
January 5, 2021; 7:00 p.m., FS1	No. 3	at DePaul; Canceled due to COVID-19 issues						Wintrust Arena; Chicago, IL
January 8, 2021; 9:00 p.m., FS1	No. 3	Marquette; Postponed due to COVID-19 issues; rescheduled for February 10						Finneran Pavilion; Villanova, PA
January 13, 2021; 6:30 p.m., FS1	No. 3	at Xavier; Canceled due to COVID-19 issues						Cintas Center; Cincinnati, OH
January 15, 2021; 9:00 p.m., FS1	No. 3	at No. 25 Connecticut; Postponed due to COVID-19 issues; rescheduled for January 28						Gampel Pavilion; Storrs, CT
January 19, 2021; 9:00 p.m., FS1	No. 3	Seton Hall	W 76–74	9–1 (4–0)	22 – Gillespie	9 – Samuels	7 – Moore	Finneran Pavilion (0); Villanova, PA
January 23, 2021; 2:30 p.m., FOX	No. 3	Providence	W 71–56	10–1 (5–0)	15 – Tied	10 – Samuels	6 – Gillespie	Finneran Pavilion (0); Villanova, PA
January 28, 2021; 9:00 p.m., FS1	No. 3	at Connecticut; Canceled due to COVID-19 issues						Gampel Pavilion; Storrs, CT
January 30, 2021; 3:00 p.m., FOX	No. 3	at Seton Hall	W 80–72	11–1 (6–0)	23 – Robinson-Earl	5 – Tied	11 – Gillespie	Prudential Center (0); Newark, NJ
February 3, 2021; 9:00 p.m., CBSSN	No. 3	at St. John's	L 59–70	11–2 (6–1)	16 – Daniels	17 – Robinson-Earl	6 – Gillespie	Carnesecca Arena (0); Queens, NY
February 7, 2021; 2:30 p.m., FOX	No. 3	Xavier; Canceled due to COVID-19 issues						Finneran Pavilion; Villanova, PA
February 7, 2021; 2:30 p.m., FOX	No. 3	Georgetown	W 84–74	12–2 (7–1)	32 – Samuels	6 – Robinson-Earl/Samuels	5 – 3 tied	Finneran Pavilion (0); Villanova, PA
February 9, 2021; 9:00 p.m., FS1	No. 5	DePaul; Canceled due to COVID-19 issues						Finneran Pavilion; Villanova, PA
February 10, 2021; 9:00 p.m., FS1	No. 5	Marquette	W 96–64	13–2 (8–1)	27 – Robinson-Earl	11 – Gillespie	3 – Tied	Finneran Pavilion (0); Villanova, PA
February 13, 2021; 5:00 p.m., FOX	No. 5	at No. 19 Creighton	L 70–86	13–3 (8–2)	21 – Moore	7 – Robinson-Earl	3 – Tied	CHI Health Center Omaha (2,544); Omaha, NE
February 20, 2021; 1:00 p.m., FOX	No. 10	Connecticut	W 68–60	14–3 (9–2)	20 – Gillespie	11 – Robinson-Earl	3 – Swider	Finneran Pavilion (0); Villanova, PA
February 23, 2021; 8:00 p.m., CBSSN	No. 8	St. John's	W 81–58	15–3 (10–2)	17 – Daniels	9 – Samuels	5 – Gillespie	Finneran Pavilion (0); Villanova, PA
February 28, 2021; 12:00 p.m., CBS	No. 8	at Butler	L 61–73	15–4 (10–3)	16 – Robinson-Earl	16 – Robinson-Earl	2 – Gillespie	Hinkle Fieldhouse (2,203); Indianapolis, IN
March 3, 2021; 8:30 p.m., FS1	No. 10	No. 14 Creighton	W 72–60	16–4 (11–3)	24 – Moore	14 – Robinson-Earl	7 – Samuels	Finneran Pavilion (0); Villanova, PA
March 6, 2021; 2:30 p.m., FOX	No. 10	at Providence	L 52–54	16–5 (11–4)	21 – Samuels	13 – Robinson-Earl	2 – Arcidiacono	Alumni Hall (0); Providence, RI
Big East tournament
March 11, 2021; 12:00 p.m., FS1	(1) No. 14	vs. (8) Georgetown; Quarterfinals	L 71–72	16–6	26 – Robinson-Earl	7 – Samuels	4 – Samuels	Madison Square Garden (824); Manhattan, NY
NCAA tournament
March 19, 2021*; 9:57 pm, TNT	(5 S) No. 18	vs. (12 S) Winthrop; First Round	W 73–63	17–6	22 – Robinson-Earl	12 – Robinson-Earl	5 – Robinson-Earl	Indiana Farmers Coliseum (873); Indianapolis, IN
March 21, 2021*; 8:45 pm, TNT	(5 S) No. 18	vs. (13 S) North Texas; Second Round	W 84–61	18–6	18 – Robinson-Earl	9 – Samuels	6 – Robinson-Earl	Bankers Life Fieldhouse; Indianapolis, IN
March 27, 2021*; 5:15 pm, CBS	(5 S) No. 18	vs. (1 S) No. 3 Baylor; Sweet Sixteen	L 51–62	18–7	16 – Samuels	12 – Robinson-Earl	3 – Moore	Hinkle Fieldhouse; Indianapolis, IN
*Non-conference game. ^{#}Rankings from AP Poll. (#) Tournament seedings in parentheses. All times are in Eastern Time.

== Rankings ==
Ranking movements Legend: ██ Increase in ranking ██ Decrease in ranking
	Week																	
Poll	Pre	1	2	3	4	5	6	7	8	9	10	11	12	13	14	15	16	Final
AP	3	12	9	7	5	4	3	3	3	3	3	5	10	8	10	14	18	Not released
Coaches	3	3	6	6	3	3	3	3	3	3	3	4	7	6	9	11	17	11

^Coaches did not release a Week 1 poll.
