= 2019 McDonald's All-American Boys Game =

American high school basketball game

East	West
115	100
	1st half	2nd half	Total
East	60	55	115
West	49	51	100
- Date: March 27, 2019
- Venue: State Farm Arena, Atlanta, Georgia
- MVP: Cole Anthony
- Referees: Kellen Miliner, John Wilmer, Michael Woods
- Network: ESPN2

McDonald's All-American

The 2019 McDonald's All-American Boys Game was an All-star basketball game that was played on Wednesday, March 27, 2019 at the State Farm Arena in Atlanta, Georgia, home of the Atlanta Hawks. The game's rosters featured the best and most highly recruited high school boys graduating in the class of 2019. The game was the 42nd annual version of the McDonald's All-American Game first played in 1977. Cole Anthony of the East had 14 points, five rebounds and seven assists, and was named the game's most valuable player (MVP).

The 24 players were selected from 2,500 nominees by a committee of basketball experts. They were chosen not only for their on-court skills, but for their performances off the court as well. Coach Morgan Wootten, who had more than 1,200 wins as head basketball coach at DeMatha Catholic High School, was chairman of the selection committee.

== Rosters ==
When the rosters were announced on January 24, 2019, Arizona, Duke, Florida, Kentucky, and Villanova had two selectees, while the rest of the schools had one. At the announcement of roster selections, only 13 schools were represented and had 6 players uncommitted. The two highest rated players (Cole Anthony) was named to the East team. The West team was highlighted by (James Wiseman). On January 21, Isaiah Stewart committed to Washington during the 2019 Spalding Hoophall Classic. On February 11, Anthony Edwards committed to play for Georgia. On April 19, Matthew Hurt committed to Duke (joining Moore and Carey Jr). On April 23, Cole Anthony committed to North Carolina. (joining Bacot) On May 17, Achiuwa committed to Memphis. On May 20, Watford committed to LSU. On May 21, McDaniels committed to Washington.

=== Team East ===
ESPN 100 Rank	Name	Height (ft-in)	Weight (lbs)	Position	Hometown	High school	College choice
16	Precious Achiuwa	6-9	215	SF	Port Harcourt, Nigeria	Montverde Academy	Memphis
2	Cole Anthony	6-3	185	PG	Briarwood, New York	Oak Hill Academy	North Carolina
18	Armando Bacot	6-10	230	C	Richmond, Virginia	IMG Academy	North Carolina
3	Vernon Carey Jr.	6-10	275	C	Southwest Ranches, Florida	NSU University School	Duke
5	Anthony Edwards	6-4	205	SG	Atlanta, Georgia	Holy Spirit Preparatory School	Georgia
25	Trayce Jackson-Davis	6-9	231	C	Greenwood, Indiana	Center Grove High School	Indiana
21	Josiah-Jordan James	6-6	200	PG	Charleston, South Carolina	Porter-Gaud School	Tennessee
12	Scottie Lewis	6-5	185	SF	Colts Neck Township, New Jersey	Ranney School	Florida
6	Jaden McDaniels	6-10	185	PF	Federal Way, Washington	Federal Way High School	Washington
19	Wendell Moore Jr.	6-6	215	SF	Concord, North Carolina	Cox Mill High School	Duke
4	Isaiah Stewart	6-9	245	C	Rochester, New York	La Lumiere School	Washington
22	Trendon Watford	6-8	210	PF	Mountain Brook, Alabama	Mountain Brook High School	LSU

=== Team West ===
ESPN 100 Rank	Name	Height (ft-in)	Weight (lbs)	Position	Hometown	High school	College choice
14	Bryan Antoine	6-5	170	SG	Tinton Falls, New Jersey	Ranney School	Villanova
7	Josh Green	6-6	206	SG	Sydney, New South Wales	IMG Academy	Arizona
10	Matthew Hurt	6-8	214	PF	Rochester, Minnesota	John Marshall High School	Duke
32	Tre Mann	6-4	185	PG	Gainesville, Florida	The Villages Charter High School	Florida
8	Nico Mannion	6-3	180	PG	Siena, Italy	Pinnacle High School	Arizona
11	Tyrese Maxey	6-4	185	SG	Garland, Texas	South Garland High School	Kentucky
15	Isaiah Mobley	6-9	210	PF	Temecula, California	Rancho Christian School	USC
20	Jeremiah Robinson-Earl	6-9	235	PF	Overland Park, Kansas	IMG Academy	Villanova
37	Oscar Tshiebwe	6-8	230	C	Lubumbashi, DRC	Kennedy Catholic High School	West Virginia
9	Kahlil Whitney	6-7	200	SF	Roselle, New Jersey	Roselle Catholic High School	Kentucky
33	Samuell Williamson	6-7	190	SF	Rockwall, Texas	Rockwall High School	Louisville
1	James Wiseman	7-0	230	C	Memphis, Tennessee	East High School	Memphis

^undecided at the time of roster selection
^{~}undecided at game time

== Box Score ==
ESPN2

March 27, 2019
07:00 pm ET

East	115–100	West
Scoring by half: 60–49, 55–51
Pts: Precious Achiuwa (22); Rebs: Precious Achiuwa (9); Asts: Cole Anthony (7)		Pts: James Wiseman, Tyrese Maxey, Jeremiah Robinson-Earl (13); Rebs: Oscar Tshiebwe (10); Asts: Isaiah Mobley (4)

State Farm Arena, Atlanta, GA
