= JRE =

JRE may refer to:

- Java Runtime Environment
- Jeremiah Robinson-Earl
- The Joe Rogan Experience
- JR East, see East Japan Railway Company
- Jeunes Restaurateurs d’Europe
