= Bryan Antoine =

American basketball player

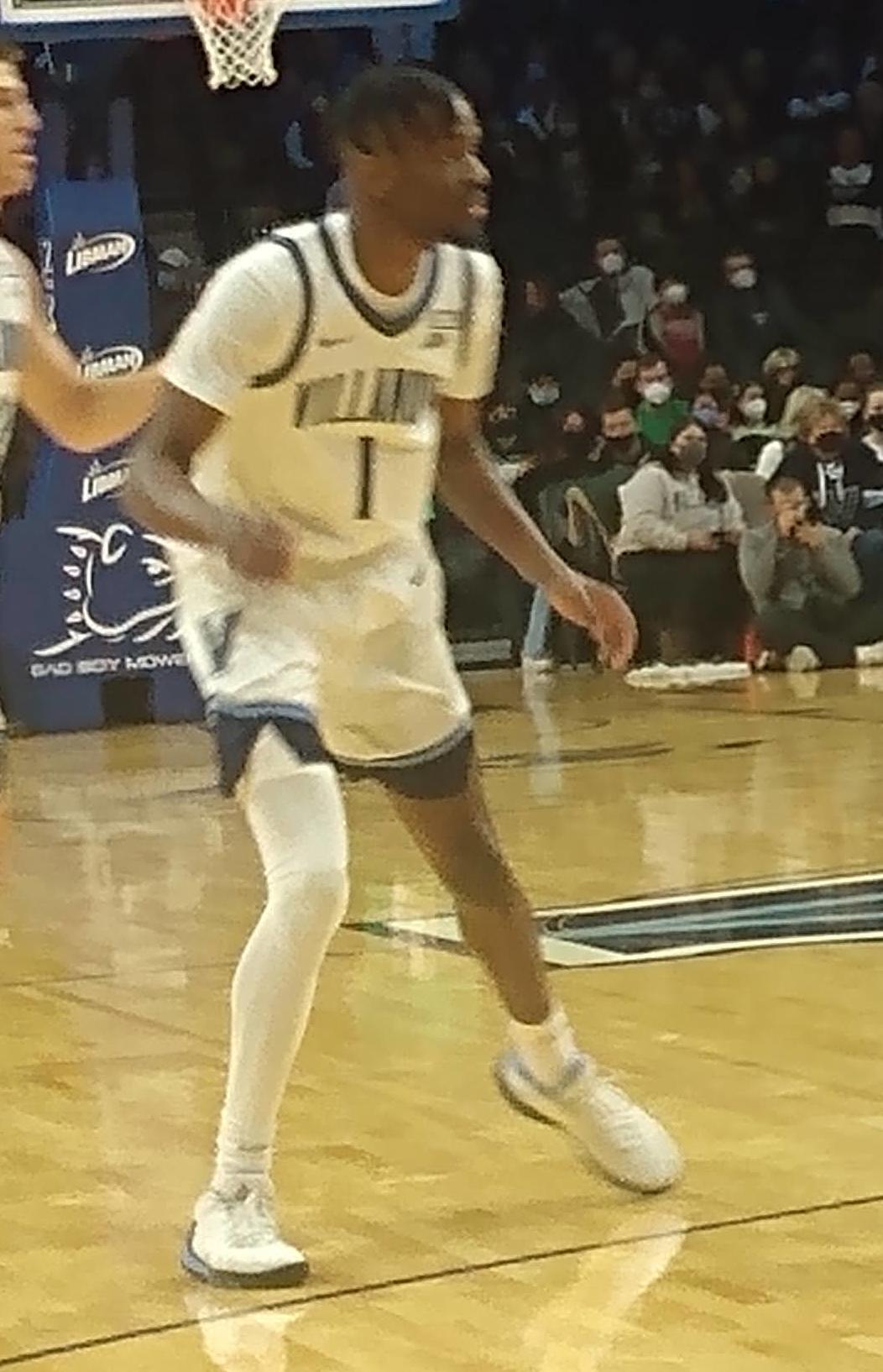
- Antoine with Villanova in 2022

No. 0 – Donar
- Position: Shooting guard
- League: BNXT League; ENBL

Personal information
- Born: April 26, 2000 (age 26) Nyack, New York, U.S.
- Listed height: 6 ft 5 in (1.96 m)
- Listed weight: 185 lb (84 kg)

Career information
- High school: Ranney School (Tinton Falls, New Jersey)
- College: Villanova (2019–2022); Radford (2022–2024)
- NBA draft: 2024: undrafted
- Playing career: 2024–present

Career history
- 2024–2025: Pelister
- 2025–2026: Den Helder Suns
- 2026–present: Donar

Career highlights
- McDonald's All-American (2019)

Bryan Antoine (born April 26, 2000) is an American professional basketball player for Donar of the BNXT League and ENBL. He played college basketball for the Villanova Wildcats and Radford Highlanders.

== High school career ==
A resident with his family of Tinton Falls, New Jersey, Antoine attended Ranney School in Tinton Falls for his four years in high school where he played along with Scottie Lewis. He averaged 21 points per game as a senior and led the school to 31 wins and the NJSIAA Tournament of Champions. He finished his career with 2,514 points. Antoine was named a McDonald's All-American.

=== Recruiting ===
Antoine was a consensus five-star recruit and one of the top players in the 2019 class. On September 4, 2018, he committed to playing college basketball for Villanova over offers from Duke, Florida, Kansas, and Kentucky.

College recruiting
Name	Hometown	School	Height	Weight	Commit date
Bryan Antoine; SG	Tinton Falls, NJ	Ranney School (NJ)	6 ft 5 in (1.96 m)	170 lb (77 kg)	Sep 4, 2018
Bryan Antoine; SG	Recruit ratings: Rivals: 247Sports: ESPN: (95)				
Overall recruit ranking: Rivals: 15 247Sports: 20 ESPN: 15
Note: In many cases, Scout, Rivals, 247Sports, On3, and ESPN may conflict in their listings of height and weight.; In these cases, the average was taken. ESPN grades are on a 100-point scale.; Sources: "Villanova 2019 Basketball Commitments". Rivals.; "2019 Villanova Wildcats Recruiting Class". ESPN.; "2019 Team Ranking". Rivals.

== College career ==
Antoine underwent glenoid labrum surgery in May 2019 and was not cleared to practice until November. He made his college debut against Middle Tennessee on November 21, finishing with nine points and two assists. Antoine struggled to find consistent playing time due to the aftereffects of the injury and considered sitting out the season as a redshirt, but eventually decided to play limited minutes as he was "a patient person." He averaged 1.1 points and 0.4 rebounds per game as a freshman. As a sophomore, Antoine struggled with injuries and averaged 2.3 points and 1.2 rebounds per game.

After his junior season, Antoine transferred to Radford. In two seasons at Radford, he averaged 11.4 points per game while making 111 three-pointers.

== Professional career ==
After going undrafted in the 2024 NBA Draft, on July 26, 2024, Antoine signed with KK Pelister.

On July 13, 2025, he signed with Den Helder Suns of the BNXT League.

On June 24, 2026, he signed with a different BNXT League club, Donar Groningen. In addition, Donar plays in the ENBL.

== Career statistics ==
Legend
GP	Games played	GS	Games started	MPG	Minutes per game
FG%	Field goal percentage	3P%	3-point field goal percentage	FT%	Free throw percentage
RPG	Rebounds per game	APG	Assists per game	SPG	Steals per game
BPG	Blocks per game	PPG	Points per game	**Bold**	Career high

=== College ===
Year	Team	GP	GS	MPG	FG%	3P%	FT%	RPG	APG	SPG	BPG	PPG
2019–20	Villanova	16	0	5.4	.304	.133	**1.000**	.4	.3	.2	.0	1.1
2020–21	Villanova	10	0	11.8	.412	.385	.800	1.2	.7	.5	.0	2.3
2021–22	Villanova	20	0	10.0	.238	.172	**1.000**	1.2	.5	.3	.1	1.5
2022–23	Radford	31	31	28.2	**.479**	**.421**	.909	2.9	1.4	**1.7**	.3	**11.4**
2023–24	Radford	**32**	**32**	**29.5**	.397	.399	.888	**3.6**	**1.7**	1.4	**.7**	**11.4**
Career		109	63	20.4	.417	.375	.897	2.3	1.1	1.0	.3	7.2
