= 2019–20 Villanova Wildcats men's basketball team =

American college basketball season

2019–20 Villanova Wildcats men's basketball

Philadelphia Big 5 champions Big East regular season co-champions
- Conference: Big East Conference

Ranking
- Coaches: No. 9 (tie)
- AP: No. 10
- Record: 24–7 (13–5 Big East)
- Head coach: Jay Wright (19th season)
- Assistant coaches: Kyle Neptune; George Halcovage; Mike Nardi
- Home arena: Finneran Pavilion; Wells Fargo Center

2019–20 Big East men's basketball standings
	Conf.				Overall
Team	W		L	PCT	W		L	PCT
No. 7 Creighton	13	–	5	.722	24	–	7	.774
No. 10 Villanova	13	–	5	.722	24	–	7	.774
No. 15 Seton Hall	13	–	5	.722	21	–	9	.700
Providence	12	–	6	.667	19	–	12	.613
No. 23 Butler	10	–	8	.556	22	–	9	.710
Marquette	8	–	10	.444	18	–	12	.600
Xavier	8	–	10	.444	19	–	13	.594
Georgetown	5	–	13	.278	15	–	17	.469
St. John's	5	–	13	.278	17	–	15	.531
DePaul	3	–	15	.167	16	–	16	.500
Note: The 2020 Big East tournament was cancelled at halftime of the first game of the quarterfinals due to the COVID-19 pandemic. Rankings from AP poll

The 2019–20 Villanova Wildcats men's basketball team represented Villanova University in the 2019–20 NCAA Division I men's basketball season. Led by head coach Jay Wright in his 19th year, the Wildcats played their home games at the Finneran Pavilion on the school's campus in the Philadelphia suburb of Villanova, Pennsylvania and Wells Fargo Center as members of the Big East Conference. They finished the season 24–7, 13–5 in Big East play which put them in a three-way tie for first place. As the No. 2 seed in the Big East tournament, they were slated to play DePaul in the quarterfinals, but the Tournament was cancelled due to the COVID-19 pandemic, along with the rest of the NCAA postseason. The team officially finished ninth in the Coaches Poll and tenth in the AP Poll, which served as de facto selectors during the season.

== Previous season ==
The Wildcats finished the 2018–19 season 26–10, 13–5 in Big East play to finish in first place. They defeated Providence, Xavier, and Seton Hall to win the Big East tournament. As a result, the Wildcats received the conference's automatic bid to the NCAA tournament as the No. 6 seed in the South region. There they defeated Saint Mary's before losing to Purdue in the Second Round.

Awards & Accomplishments

Big East Co-Regular Season Champion

Philadelphia Big 5 Champion

Saddiq Bey

NCAA AP Honorable Mention

Julius Erving Award

All-Big East First Team

Robert V. Geasey Trophy

All-Big 5 First Team

Collin Gillespie

All-Big East Second Team

All-Big 5 First Team

Jeremiah Robinson-Earl

Big East Freshman of the Year

Big East All-Freshman Team

Big 5 Freshman of the Year

All-Big 5 Second Team

Jermaine Samuels

All-Big 5 Second Team

Nova Hoops Mania Dunk Contest Champion

Justin Moore

Big East All-Freshman Team

Cole Swider

Nova Hoops Mania 3-Point Contest Champion

== Offseason ==
=== Departures ===
Name	Number	Pos.	Height	Weight	Year	Hometown	Notes
Jahvon Quinerly	1	G	6'1"	175	Freshman	Hackensack, NJ	Transferred to Alabama
Eric Paschall	4	F	6'8"	255	RS Senior	Dobbs Ferry, NY	Graduated
Phil Booth	5	G	6´3¨	194	RS Senior	Baltimore, MD	Graduated
Peyton Heck	22	G	5'11"	175	Senior	Wilmington, DE	Graduated
Joe Cremo	24	G	6'4"	191	Graduate Student	Scotia, NY	Graduated
Dylan Painter	42	G	6'10"	225	RS Sophomore	Hershey, PA	Transferred to Delaware

=== 2019 recruiting class ===
College recruiting information
Name	Hometown	School	Height	Weight	Commit date
Justin Moore #9 SG	Accokeek, MD	DeMatha Catholic High School	6 ft 4 in (1.93 m)	200 lb (91 kg)	May 2, 2018
Justin Moore #9 SG	Recruit ratings: Scout: Rivals: 247Sports: ESPN:				
Eric Dixon #18 PF	Willow Grove, PA	Abington High School	6 ft 7 in (2.01 m)	275 lb (125 kg)	Apr 17, 2018
Eric Dixon #18 PF	Recruit ratings: Scout: Rivals: 247Sports: ESPN:				
Bryan Antoine #12 SG	Tinton Falls, NJ	Ranney School	6 ft 5 in (1.96 m)	170 lb (77 kg)	Sep 4, 2018
Bryan Antoine #12 SG	Recruit ratings: Scout: Rivals: 247Sports: ESPN:				
Jeremiah Robinson-Earl; PF	Shawnee Mission, KS	IMG Academy (FL)	6 ft 9 in (2.06 m)	235 lb (107 kg)	Oct 30, 2018
Jeremiah Robinson-Earl; PF	Recruit ratings: Scout: Rivals: 247Sports: ESPN:				
Overall recruit ranking:
Note: In many cases, Scout, Rivals, 247Sports, On3, and ESPN may conflict in their listings of height and weight.; In these cases, the average was taken. ESPN grades are on a 100-point scale.; Sources: "2019 Villanova Commits". Rivals.; "2019 Team Ranking". Rivals.

=== Incoming transfers ===
Name	Number	Pos.	Height	Weight	Year	Hometown	Previous School
Caleb Daniels	14	G	6'4"	205	Sophomore	New Orleans, LA	Transferred from Tulane. Under NCAA transfer rules, Daniels will have to sit out for the 2019–20 season. Will have two years of remaining eligibility.

== Roster ==
2019–20 Villanova Wildcats men's basketball team
Players
Coaches

Pos.	#	Name	Height	Weight	Year	Previous school	Hometown
G	1	Bryan Antoine	6 ft 5 in (1.96 m)	175 lb (79 kg)	Fr	Ranney School	Tinton Falls, NJ
G	2	Collin Gillespie	6 ft 3 in (1.91 m)	191 lb (87 kg)	Jr	Archbishop Wood HS	Warminster, PA
F	3	Brandon Slater	6 ft 7 in (2.01 m)	202 lb (92 kg)	So	Paul VI Catholic HS	Fairfax, VA
G	4	Chris Arcidiacono	6 ft 5 in (1.96 m)	197 lb (89 kg)	Fr	Perkiomen School	Langhorne, PA
G	5	Justin Moore	6 ft 4 in (1.93 m)	210 lb (95 kg)	Fr	DeMatha Catholic HS	Fort Washington, MD
F	10	Cole Swider	6 ft 9 in (2.06 m)	219 lb (99 kg)	So	St. Andrews School	Providence, RI
G	12	Tim Saunders (W)	6 ft 4 in (1.93 m)	200 lb (91 kg)	Sr	Torrey Pines HS	Del Mar, CA
G	14	Caleb Daniels (redshirt)	6 ft 4 in (1.93 m)	205 lb (93 kg)	So	Tulane	New Orleans, LA
G	20	Kevin Hoehn (W)	6 ft 1 in (1.85 m)	180 lb (82 kg)	Jr	Morristown HS	Morristown, NJ
F	21	Dhamir Cosby-Roundtree	6 ft 9 in (2.06 m)	228 lb (103 kg)	Jr	Neumann–Goretti Catholic HS	Philadelphia, PA
F	23	Jermaine Samuels	6 ft 7 in (2.01 m)	222 lb (101 kg)	Jr	The Rivers School	Franklin, MA
F	24	Jeremiah Robinson-Earl	6 ft 9 in (2.06 m)	232 lb (105 kg)	Fr	IMG Academy	Overland Park, KS
F	41	Saddiq Bey	6 ft 8 in (2.03 m)	216 lb (98 kg)	So	Sidwell Friends School	Washington, D.C.
F	43	Eric Dixon (redshirt)	6 ft 8 in (2.03 m)	270 lb (122 kg)	Fr	Abington HS	Willow Grove, PA

Head coach

- Jay Wright (Bucknell)

Assistant coach(es)

- Kyle Neptune (Lehigh)
- George Halcovage (Babson)
- Mike Nardi (Villanova)

Legend

- (C) Team captain
- (S) Suspended
- (I) Ineligible
- (W) Walk-on
- Injured
- Current redshirt

Roster
Last update: December 1, 2019

== Schedule and results ==
Date time, TV	Rank^{#}	Opponent^{#}	Result	Record	High points	High rebounds	High assists	Site (attendance) city, state
Exhibition
October 18, 2019*; 8:00 pm, P12N		USC; Charity Exhibition	L 61-72	–	15 – Tied	10 – Okongwu	–	Galen Center; Los Angeles, CA
Regular season
November 5, 2019*; 8:30 pm, FS1	No. 10	Army	W 97–54	1–0	24 – Robinson-Earl	13 – Robinson-Earl	5 – Samuels	Finneran Pavilion (6,501); Villanova, PA
November 13, 2019*; 7:00 pm, FS1	No. 10	at No. 16 Ohio State; Gavitt Tipoff Games	L 51–76	1–1	14 – Samuels	6 – Robinson-Earl	5 – Gillespie	Value City Arena (16,419); Columbus, OH
November 16, 2019*; 12:00 pm, FS2	No. 10	Ohio; Myrtle Beach Invitational campus game	W 78–54	2–1	19 – Bey	11 – Robinson-Earl	5 – Samuels	Wells Fargo Center (13,678); Philadelphia, PA
November 21, 2019*; 11:30 am, ESPN2	No. 17	vs. Middle Tennessee; Myrtle Beach Invitational quarterfinal	W 98–69	3–1	26 – Swider	10 – Robinson-Earl	7 – Gillespie	HTC Center; Conway, SC
November 22, 2019*; 2:30 pm, ESPN2	No. 17	vs. Mississippi State; Myrtle Beach Invitational semifinal	W 83–76	4–1	22 – Robinson-Earl	7 – Tied	9 – Gillespie	HTC Center (2,361); Conway, SC
November 24, 2019*; 5:00 pm, ESPN	No. 17	vs. No. 24 Baylor; Myrtle Beach Invitational championship game	L 78–87	4–2	27 – Gillespie	11 – Robinson-Earl	6 – Gillespie	HTC Center; Conway, SC
December 1, 2019*; 6:30 pm, FS1	No. 22	La Salle; Philadelphia Big 5	W 83–72	5–2	25 – Moore	10 – Tied	5 – Samuels	Finneran Pavilion (6,501); Villanova, PA
December 4, 2019*; 6:30 pm, FS1	No. 23	Penn; Philadelphia Big 5	W 80–69	6–2	27 – Bey	12 – Robinson-Earl	6 – Gillespie	Finneran Pavilion (6,501); Villanova, PA
December 7, 2019*; 3:00 pm, ESPN2	No. 23	at Saint Joseph's; Philadelphia Big 5	W 78–66	7–2	22 – Bey	9 – Bey	2 – Tied	Hagan Arena (3,456); Philadelphia, PA
December 14, 2019*; 2:00 pm, ESPN2	No. 20	vs. Delaware; Never Forget Tribute Classic	W 78–70	8–2	18 – Samuels	8 – Robinson-Earl	6 – Gillespie	Prudential Center (7,236); Newark, NJ
December 21, 2019*; 12:00 pm, FOX	No. 18	No. 1 Kansas; Big East/Big 12 Battle	W 56–55	9–2	15 – Samuels	9 – Robinson-Earl	5 – Bey	Wells Fargo Center (20,706); Philadelphia, PA
December 30, 2019; 6:30 pm, FS1	No. 10	Xavier	W 68–62	10–2 (1–0)	24 – Gillespie	8 – Samuels	5 – Gillespie	Finneran Pavilion (6,501); Villanova, PA
January 4, 2020; 2:00 pm, FOX	No. 10	at Marquette	L 60–71	10–3 (1–1)	14 – Tied	11 – Robinson-Earl	3 – Gillespie	Fiserv Forum (17,856); Milwaukee, WI
January 7, 2020; 9:00 pm, FS1	No. 16	at Creighton	W 64–59	11–3 (2–1)	24 – Gillespie	14 – Robinson-Earl	3 – Robinson-Earl	CHI Health Center Omaha (17,682); Omaha, NE
January 11, 2020; 12:00 pm, FS1	No. 16	Georgetown	W 80–66	12–3 (3–1)	33 – Bey	7 – Robinson-Earl	5 – Tied	Wells Fargo Center (15,041); Philadelphia, PA
January 14, 2020; 8:30 pm, FS1	No. 14	DePaul	W 79–75 ^{OT}	13–3 (4–1)	21 – Gillespie	13 – Robinson-Earl	4 – Tied	Finneran Pavilion (6,501); Villanova, PA
January 18, 2020*; 12:00 pm, FS1	No. 14	Connecticut	W 61–55	14–3	19 – Samuels	7 – Robinson-Earl	3 – Tied	Wells Fargo Center (16,723); Philadelphia, PA
January 21, 2020; 7:00 pm, CBSSN	No. 9	No. 13 Butler	W 76–61	15–3 (5–1)	20 – Samuels	14 – Robinson-Earl	7 – Gillespie	Finneran Pavilion (6,501); Villanova, PA
January 25, 2020; 1:00 pm, CBS	No. 9	at Providence	W 64–60	16–3 (6–1)	18 – Gillespie	9 – Bey	5 – Gillespie	Dunkin' Donuts Center (12,927); Providence, RI
January 28, 2020; 6:30 pm, FS1	No. 8	at St. John's	W 79–59	17–3 (7–1)	23 – Bey	14 – Robinson-Earl	6 – Gillespie	Madison Square Garden (10,155); New York, NY
February 1, 2020; 12:00 pm, FS1	No. 8	Creighton	L 61–76	17–4 (7–2)	18 – Tied	10 – Robinson-Earl	3 – Robinson-Earl	Wells Fargo Center (15,501); Philadelphia, PA
February 5, 2020; 6:30 pm, FS1	No. 10	at No. 19 Butler	L 76–79	17–5 (7–3)	29 – Bey	7 – Samuels	6 – Gillespie	Hinkle Fieldhouse (8,814); Indianapolis, IN
February 8, 2020; 2:30 pm, FOX	No. 10	No. 12 Seton Hall	L 60–64	17–6 (7–4)	22 – Bey	14 – Robinson-Earl	4 – Tied	Wells Fargo Center (20,706); Philadelphia, PA
February 12, 2020; 8:30 pm, FS1	No. 15	No. 18 Marquette	W 72–71	18–6 (8–4)	17 – Robinson-Earl	11 – Robinson-Earl	4 – 3 tied	Finneran Pavilion (6,501); Villanova, PA
February 16, 2020*; 1:00 pm, ESPN	No. 15	at Temple; Philadelphia Big 5	W 76–56	19–6	29 – Gillespie	8 – Bey	5 – Tied	Liacouras Center (10,206); Philadelphia, PA
February 19, 2020; 9:00 pm, CBSSN	No. 12	at DePaul	W 91–71	20–6 (9–4)	20 – Bey	7 – Cosby-Roundtree	7 – Bey	Wintrust Arena (5,451); Chicago, IL
February 22, 2020; 2:30 pm, FOX	No. 12	at Xavier	W 64–55	21–6 (10–4)	22 – Bey	12 – Robinson-Earl	6 – Gillespie	Cintas Center (10,647); Cincinnati, OH
February 26, 2020; 6:30 pm, FS1	No. 12	St. John's	W 71–60	22–6 (11–4)	23 – Bey	10 – Samuels	4 – Gillespie	Finneran Pavilion (6,501); Villanova, PA
February 29, 2020; 12:00 pm, FOX	No. 12	Providence	L 54–58	22–7 (11–5)	13 – Gillespie	11 – Robinson-Earl	3 – Gillespie	Wells Fargo Center (15,516); Philadelphia, PA
March 4, 2020; 8:30 pm, FS1	No. 14	at No. 8 Seton Hall	W 79–77	23–7 (12–5)	20 – Bey	11 – Robinson-Earl	5 – Samuels	Prudential Center (16,863); Newark, NJ
March 7, 2020; 12:00 pm, FOX	No. 14	at Georgetown	W 70–69	24–7 (13–5)	18 – Bey	9 – Moore	5 – Gillespie	Capital One Arena (13,168); Washington, DC
Big East tournament
March 12, 2020; 7:00 pm, FS1	(2) No. 11	vs. (10) DePaul; Quarterfinals						Madison Square Garden; New York, NY
*Non-conference game. ^{#}Rankings from AP Poll. (#) Tournament seedings in parentheses. All times are in Eastern Time.

== Rankings ==
Ranking movements Legend: ██ Increase in ranking ██ Decrease in ranking т = Tied with team above or below
	Week																			
Poll	Pre	1	2	3	4	5	6	7	8	9	10	11	12	13	14	15	16	17	18	Final
AP	10	10	17	22	23	20	18	10	10	16	14	9	8	10	15	12	12	14	11	10
Coaches	10	10*	15	21	22	20	14	9	9	16	15	11	10	12	16	13	12	12	8	9-T

*AP does not release post-NCAA Tournament rankings
^Coaches did not release a Week 1 poll.
