= Caleb Daniels =

American basketball player (born 1999)

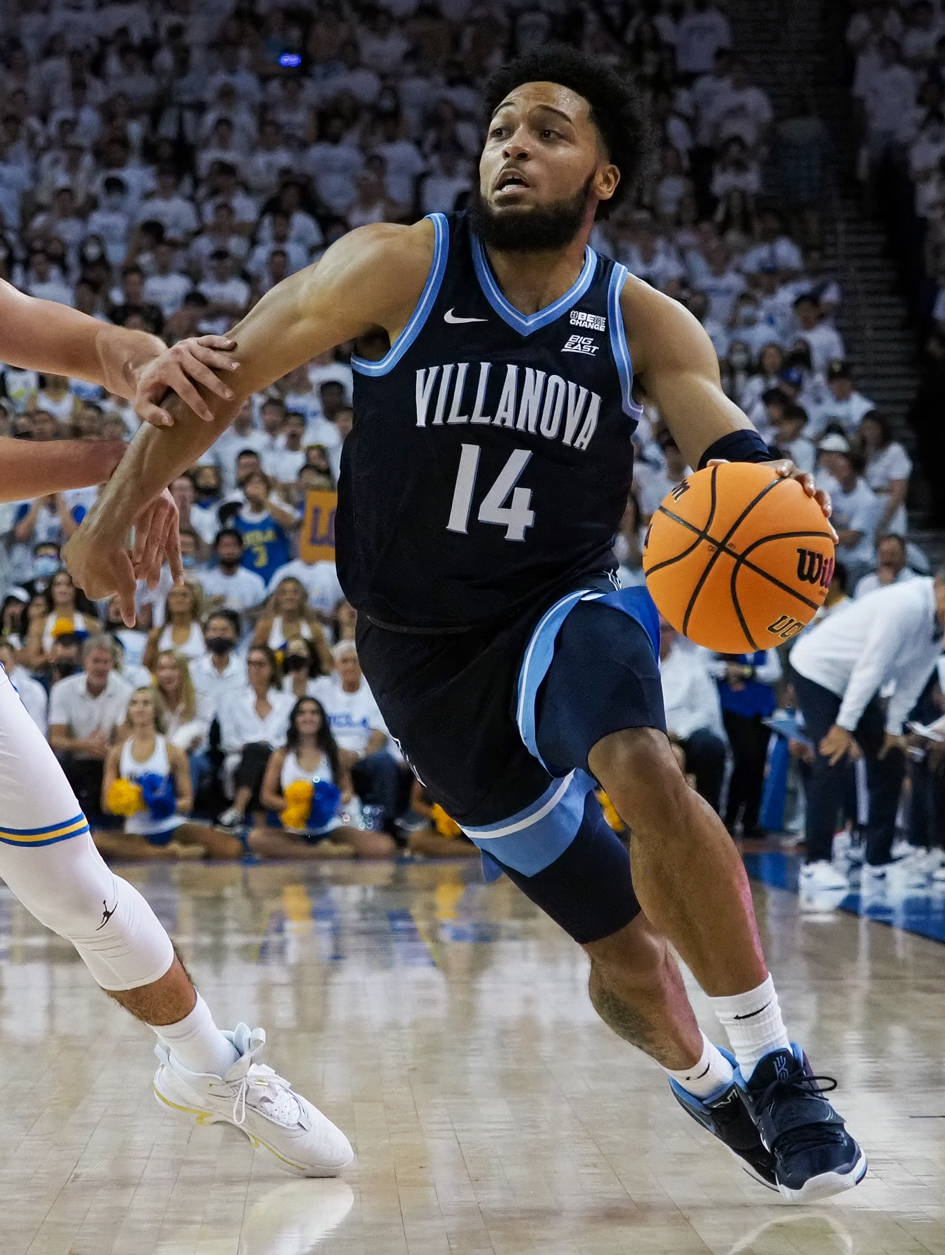
- Daniels with Villanova in 2021

No. 15 – Filou Oostende
- Position: Shooting guard
- League: BNXT League

Personal information
- Born: May 17, 1999 (age 27) New Orleans, Louisiana, U.S.
- Listed height: 6 ft 4 in (1.93 m)
- Listed weight: 210 lb (95 kg)

Career information
- High school: St. Augustine (New Orleans, Louisiana)
- College: Tulane (2017–2019); Villanova (2019–2023)
- NBA draft: 2023: undrafted
- Playing career: 2023–present

Career history
- 2023–2025: Sioux Falls Skyforce
- 2025–present: Filou Oostende

Career highlights
- Belgian League champion (2025); Belgian Cup winner (2025)
- Stats at NBA.com
- Stats at Basketball Reference

Caleb Daniels (born May 17, 1999) is an American professional basketball player for Filou Oostende of the BNXT League. He played college basketball for the Tulane Green Wave and Villanova Wildcats.

== High school career ==
Daniels attended St. Augustine High School in New Orleans, Louisiana. He averaged 20 points per game as a junior. As a senior, he averaged 19 points and 12 rebounds per game, leading the Purple Knights to the Division I semifinals. Daniels was selected to the All-Metro team by The Times-Picayune. He was named to the second team all-state in the Louisiana Sports Writers Association Class 5A, and he was voted Most Valuable Player in the Catholic League. In April 2017, Daniels committed to playing college basketball for Tulane over offers from Louisiana-Lafayette, New Orleans, Texas State, Rice, VCU, and UNC Asheville. He was the valedictorian of his class, and his speech spoke of a brotherhood at the high school and quoted Harriet Tubman.

== College career ==
Daniels averaged 6.4 points, 2.2 rebounds, and 1.5 assists per game as a freshman. On March 9, 2019, he scored a career-high 36 points in a 82–79 loss to Wichita State. As a sophomore, Daniels averaged 16.9 points, 5.3 rebounds and 3.3 assists per game, although Tulane finished 4–27. Following the season, he declared for the 2019 NBA draft and worked out for the Boston Celtics. Daniels ultimately opted to transfer to Villanova, citing a pickup game against Collin Gillespie as the deciding factor, and sat out the 2019–20 season as a redshirt.

In early January 2021, Daniels was one of two Villanova players who tested positive for COVID-19, forcing the program to shut down for two weeks. He averaged 9.6 points, 2.2 rebounds and 1.2 assists per game as a redshirt junior. In April 2021, Daniels was diagnosed with myocarditis and was instructed to avoid most basketball activities. Over the summer, he only practiced free throw shooting and his heart was monitored. By September, no abnormalities were detected by MRIs and stress tests, and Daniels was cleared to resume normal basketball activities. In part due to lack of conditioning, he was relegated to a sixth man role going into the season. On March 1, 2022, Daniels scored 20 points in a 76–74 win against ninth-ranked Providence. After returning for his super-senior season, Daniels averaged 14.2 points and 4.2 rebounds per game.

== Professional career ==
=== Sioux Falls Skyforce (2023–2025) ===
After going undrafted in the 2023 NBA draft, Daniels joined the Miami Heat for the 2023 NBA Summer League and on August 11, 2023, he signed with the team. However, he was waived on September 27, 2023. On October 30, he joined the Sioux Falls Skyforce.

After joining them for the 2024 NBA Summer League, Daniels signed with the Heat on September 26, 2024, but was waived on October 10. On October 28, he rejoined the Skyforce.

=== BC Oostende (2025–present) ===
On March 31, 2025, he signed with Filou Oostende of the BNXT League.

== Career statistics ==
Legend
GP	Games played	GS	Games started	MPG	Minutes per game
FG%	Field goal percentage	3P%	3-point field goal percentage	FT%	Free throw percentage
RPG	Rebounds per game	APG	Assists per game	SPG	Steals per game
BPG	Blocks per game	PPG	Points per game	**Bold**	Career high

=== College ===
Year	Team	GP	GS	MPG	FG%	3P%	FT%	RPG	APG	SPG	BPG	PPG
2017–18	Tulane	30	0	18.3	.429	**.396**	.800	2.2	1.5	.2	**.3**	6.4
2018–19	Tulane	30	30	**33.9**	**.445**	.346	.687	**5.3**	**3.3**	.8	**.3**	**16.9**
2019–20	Villanova	Redshirt										
2020–21	Villanova	25	24	25.8	.414	.386	.792	2.2	1.2	.4	.0	9.6
2021–22	Villanova	**35**	3	27.6	.424	.373	.853	3.8	1.0	.7	.2	10.3
2022–23	Villanova	34	**34**	33.5	.394	.332	**.858**	4.5	2.5	**1.0**	.1	14.2
Career		154	91	28.0	.420	.358	.780	3.7	1.9	.6	.2	11.6

== Personal life ==
Daniels is the youngest of three sons of Connie and Roland Daniels. His oldest brother R. J. played basketball at Xavier University of Louisiana, while older brother Marcel played at Dillard University before transferring to Southern University at New Orleans.
