= AJ Gracia =

American baseball player (born 2004)

Atlanta Braves
- Outfielder
- Born: October 27, 2004 (age 21); Monroe, New Jersey, U.S.
- Bats: Left Throws: Left
- Stats at Baseball Reference

Andres John Gracia (born October 27, 2004) is an American professional baseball outfielder in the Atlanta Braves organization.

== Amateur career ==
Raised in Monroe Township, Middlesex County, New Jersey, Gracia attended Ranney School. During his freshman year of high school, he verbally committed to Duke as a left-handed pitcher and outfielder. During his senior year of high school, he batted .467 with 12 home runs and was awarded the New Jersey Player of the Year Award by Prep Baseball.

In his freshman year at Duke, he primarily played in the left field, batting .305 and collecting 14 home runs with a .440 on-base percentage. He broke Duke's freshman home run record when he hit 14 home runs. At the conclusion of the season, Gracia was selected onto Baseball America's Freshman All America Second Team. In 2024, he played collegiate summer baseball with the Cotuit Kettleers of the Cape Cod Baseball League.

In June 2025, Gracia entered the transfer portal and subsequently committed to the University of Virginia to follow his former Duke coach, Chris Pollard, who had taken a head coaching position there a few months before.

== Professional career ==
Gracia was selected by the Atlanta Braves in the first round with the ninth overall selection in the 2026 Major League Baseball draft. He signed with Atlanta for a $3.9 million bonus on July 14, 2026.

== Personal life ==
Sister Marlena plays Division 1 volleyball at the University of Oregon.
