= Jermaine Samuels =

American basketball player (born 1998)

Jermaine Samuels Jr.
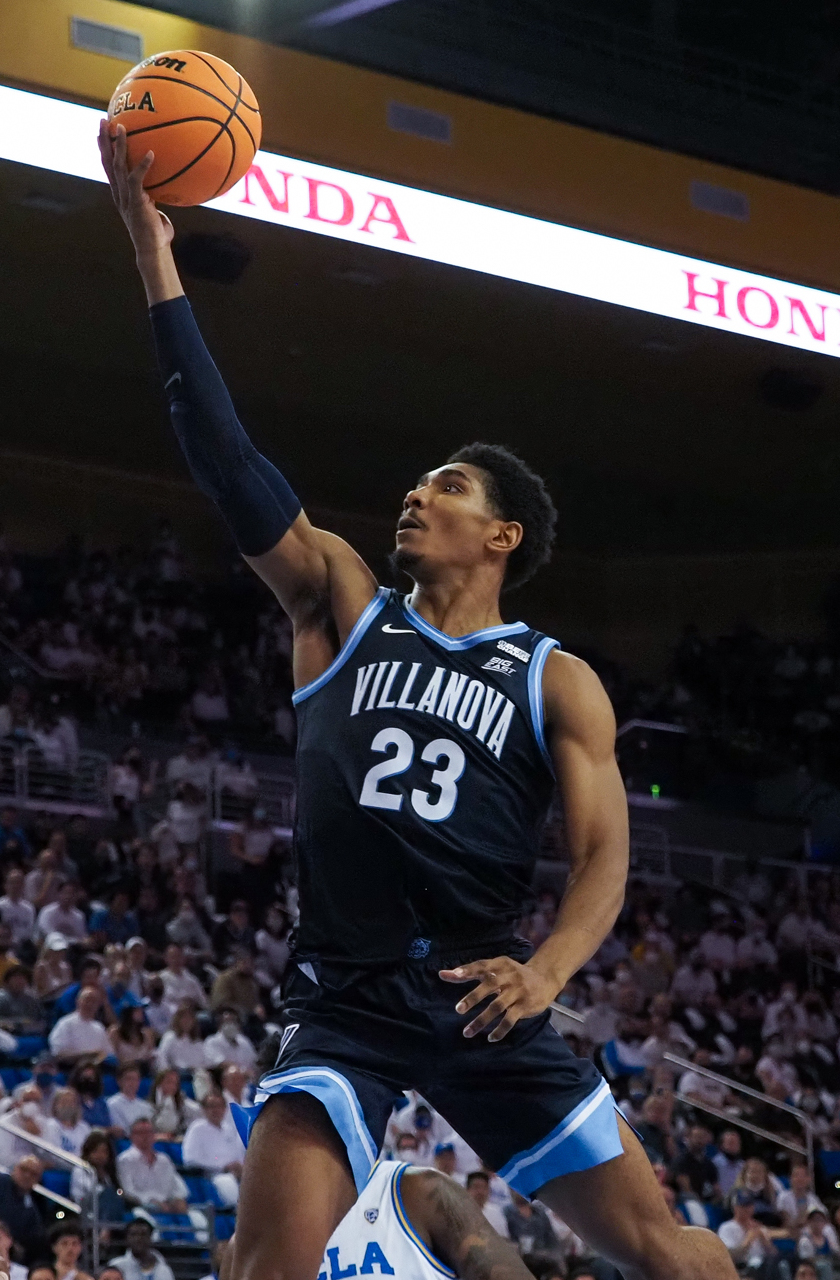
- Samuels with Villanova in 2021

No. 00 – Tezenis Verona
- Position: Power forward
- League: LBA

Personal information
- Born: November 13, 1998 (age 28) Franklin, Massachusetts, U.S.
- Listed height: 6 ft 6 in (1.98 m)
- Listed weight: 239 lb (108 kg)

Career information
- High school: Rivers School (Weston, Massachusetts)
- College: Villanova (2017–2022)
- NBA draft: 2022: undrafted
- Playing career: 2022–present

Career history
- 2022–2023: Fort Wayne Mad Ants
- 2023–2024: Houston Rockets
- 2023–2024: →Rio Grande Valley Vipers
- 2024–2025: Rio Grande Valley Vipers
- 2025–2026: San Pablo Burgos
- 2026–present: Scaligera Basket Verona

Career highlights
- NBA G League Next Up Game (2024); NCAA champion (2018); South Region Most Outstanding Player (2022); Honorable Mention All–Big East (2021)
- Stats at NBA.com
- Stats at Basketball Reference
Medals
Men's basketball
Representing United States
Pan American Games
Bronze medal – third place	2019 Lima	Team

Jermaine Samuels Jr. (born November 13, 1998) is an American professional basketball player for Scaligera Basket Verona of the Italian Lega Basket Serie A (LBA). He played college basketball for the Villanova Wildcats.

== Early life ==
Samuels is the son of Taihish and Jermaine Samuels Sr. and grew up in Franklin, Massachusetts. He began dunking the basketball at age 13 after growing from 5'9 to 6'3. Samuels attended The Rivers School, where he was coached by Andrew Mirken, as well as playing basketball in the Amateur Athletic Union (AAU) for Expressions Elite. In his freshman season, he averaged 19 points per game for The Rivers School. As a sophomore, he had a knee injury which required surgery and six months recovery. Samuels averaged 17.5 points and 12.1 rebounds per game as a senior and was named First team All-USA Massachusetts by USA Today. Samuels committed to playing college basketball for Villanova in November 2016, turning down offers from Indiana, Duke, Kansas, UConn, Georgetown, Arizona State and California. ESPN ranked him the 52nd best recruit in his class. He picked Villanova after visiting the campus in August 2016 and feeling very comfortable around the campus and coaches. He is now considered one of the top athletes out of Franklin, MA, alongside Olympian Kristie Kirshe.

== College career ==
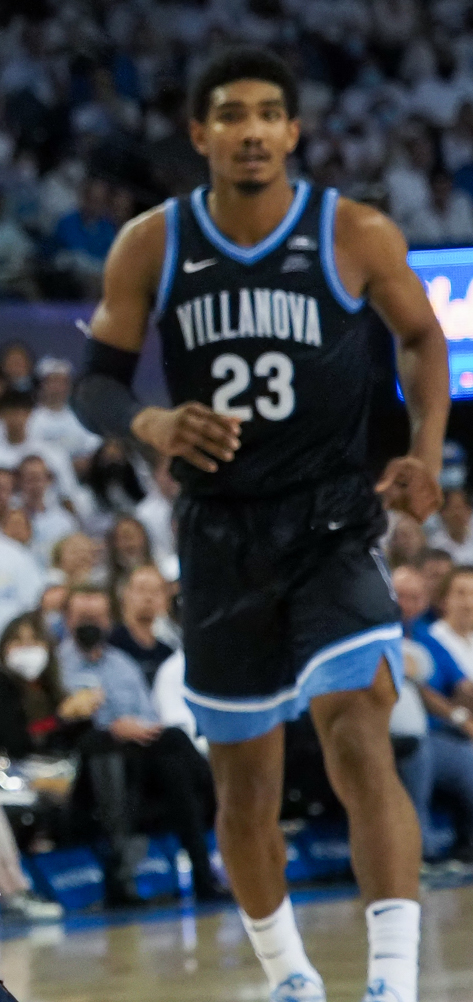
Samuels in 2021

Samuels had a season-high 11 points in a 103–85 win against DePaul on December 27, 2017. However, he fractured his left hand in the game and missed several weeks of playing time. He rejoined the rotation in February 2018 but struggled to receive consistent minutes and did not play in NCAA Tournament victories over West Virginia and Texas Tech. Samuels averaged 1.1 points and 1.2 rebounds per game as a freshman on a team that won the 2018 NCAA Division I Men's Basketball Championship Game.

On February 27, 2019, Samuels scored a season-high 29 points in a 67–61 win against Marquette. He had 12 points and seven rebounds in an NCAA Tournament win over Saint Mary's. Samuels helped Villanova achieve a 26–10 record and win the Big East Conference. He averaged 6.4 points and 5.4 rebounds per game as a sophomore.

Coming into his junior season, Samuels was named to the Preseason Second Team All-Big East alongside teammate Collin Gillespie. Samuels scored 15 points in a 56–55 win against top-ranked Kansas on December 21, 2019, including a three-pointer with 20.5 seconds remaining. On January 18, Samuels scored 19 points including a crucial three-point play in a 61–55 win against UConn. He had 20 points in a 76–61 win over Butler on January 21. On January 28, 2020, Samuels missed a game against St. John's with a sprained foot. Samuels made the game winning three-point play in a 70–69 win over Georgetown on March 7, finishing with 13 points. As a junior, Samuels averaged 10.7 points and 5.5 rebounds per game. He was named to the Second Team All-Big 5.

During the 2020 offseason, Samuels worked on his decision-making and three-point shooting, while struggle to find practice space due to the COVID-19 pandemic. He was named to the preseason Julius Erving Award watchlist. On February 7, 2021, Samuels scored a career-high 32 points and had six rebounds, five assists and three steals in an 84–74 win against Georgetown. As a senior, Samuels averaged 12 points, 6.4 rebounds and 2.5 assists per game, earning All-Big East Honorable Mention recognition. Following the season, he announced he was returning for a fifth season of eligibility.

In his fifth and final year at Villanova in 2022, Jermaine Samuels delivered a standout season, averaging 11.1 points and 6.5 rebounds per game, leading the team in rebounds and ranking third in scoring. On December 21, 2021, Samuels surpassed the 1,000 point threshold in a 84–74 win against Xavier. He elevated his play in the postseason, averaging 14 points and 8.6 rebounds during the Big East and NCAA Tournaments. Samuels was instrumental in key wins over UConn, Michigan, and Houston, helping lead Villanova to the Final Four. Against Michigan he scored 22 points, grabbed seven rebounds, and contributed two blocks, two steals, and an assist, leading the Wildcats to a 63–55 victory and a spot in the Elite Eight. For his outstanding performances, he was named the NCAA Tournament South Region MVP.

== Professional career ==
=== Fort Wayne Mad Ants (2022–2023) ===
After going undrafted in the 2022 NBA draft, Samuels signed with the Fort Wayne Mad Ants on October 24, 2022.

=== Houston Rockets / Rio Grande Valley Vipers (2023–2025) ===
On August 2, 2023, Samuels signed a two-way contract with the Houston Rockets of the NBA and the Rio Grande Valley Vipers of the NBA G League. On July 4, 2024, he signed a standard contract with the Rockets, but was waived on October 19. On October 27, he re-joined the Vipers.

=== San Pablo Burgos (2025–2026) ===
On August 21, 2025, Samuels signed with the San Pablo Burgos of the Spanish Liga ACB.

=== Scaligera Basket Verona (2026–present) ===
On July 16, 2026, he signed with Scaligera Basket Verona of the Italian Lega Basket Serie A (LBA).

== National team career ==
In July and August 2019, Samuels was a part of the United States national team who competed at the Pan American Games in Peru. The team won the bronze medal, defeating the Dominican Republic with nine points from Samuels. He averaged 9.4 points per game during the tournament.

== Career statistics ==
Legend
GP	Games played	GS	Games started	MPG	Minutes per game
FG%	Field goal percentage	3P%	3-point field goal percentage	FT%	Free throw percentage
RPG	Rebounds per game	APG	Assists per game	SPG	Steals per game
BPG	Blocks per game	PPG	Points per game	**Bold**	Career high

=== NBA ===
Year	Team	GP	GS	MPG	FG%	3P%	FT%	RPG	APG	SPG	BPG	PPG
2023–24	Houston	14	0	4.3	.643	.000	1.000	.9	.2	.1	.1	1.4
Career		14	0	4.3	.643	.000	1.000	.9	.2	.1	.1	1.4

=== College ===
Year	Team	GP	GS	MPG	FG%	3P%	FT%	RPG	APG	SPG	BPG	PPG
2017–18	Villanova	25	0	6.1	.250	.188	.625	1.2	.3	.0	.1	1.1
2018–19	Villanova	35	22	22.0	.448	.347	.622	5.4	1.0	.4	**.8**	6.4
2019–20	Villanova	30	30	**30.3**	.464	.276	.727	5.5	2.0	**.9**	.7	10.7
2020–21	Villanova	25	24	29.3	**.481**	**.371**	**.828**	6.4	**2.5**	.6	.3	**12.0**
2021–22	Villanova	**38**	**37**	29.6	.472	.276	.770	**6.5**	1.4	.8	.7	11.1
Career		153	113	24.1	.461	.306	.740	5.2	1.4	.6	.5	8.5
