= Collin Gillespie =

American basketball player (born 1999)

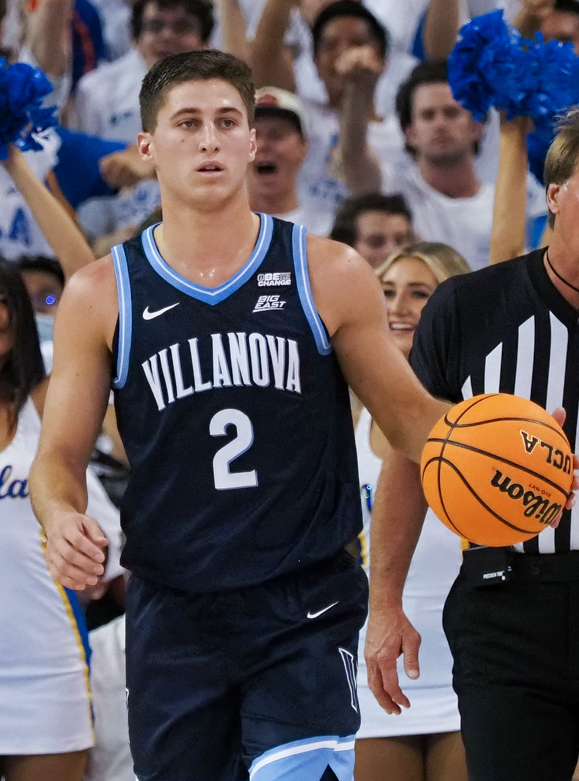
- Gillespie with Villanova in 2021

No. 12 – Phoenix Suns
- Position: Point guard
- League: NBA

Personal information
- Born: June 25, 1999 (age 27) Philadelphia, Pennsylvania, U.S.
- Listed height: 6 ft 1 in (1.85 m)
- Listed weight: 195 lb (88 kg)

Career information
- High school: Archbishop Wood Catholic (Warminster, Pennsylvania)
- College: Villanova (2017–2022)
- NBA draft: 2022: undrafted
- Playing career: 2022–present

Career history
- 2022–2024: Denver Nuggets
- 2022–2024: →Grand Rapids Gold
- 2024–present: Phoenix Suns
- 2024–2025: →Valley Suns

Career highlights
- NBA champion (2023); NBA G League Next Up Game (2024); NCAA champion (2018); 2× Third-team All-American – USBWA, NABC (2021, 2022); Third-team All-American – AP, SN (2022); Bob Cousy Award (2022); 2× Big East Player of the Year (2021, 2022); 2× First-team All-Big East (2021, 2022); Second-team All-Big East (2020); 2× Robert V. Geasey Trophy (2021, 2022); Big East tournament MVP (2022)
- Stats at NBA.com
- Stats at Basketball Reference
Medals
Men's basketball
Representing United States
Pan American Games
| Bronze medal – third place | 2019 Lima | Team |

Collin Andrew Gillespie (born June 25, 1999) is an American professional basketball player for the Phoenix Suns of the National Basketball Association (NBA). He played college basketball for the Villanova Wildcats. Gillespie was named Big East co-Player of the Year in 2021 and won it outright the following year.

== Early life ==
Gillespie grew up just outside Philadelphia and is the son of a police officer. He attended Archbishop Wood Catholic High School, where he was coached by John Mosco. Gillespie had no Division I scholarship offers coming into his senior year, but received offers from Rider, Hofstra and Villanova after strong play in a tournament. He scored 42 points in a regular-season win over Neumann Goretti featuring Kentucky recruit Quade Green. As a senior, he led the team to a PIAA Class 5A state title in 2017. Gillespie averaged 24.1 points per game as a senior and was named Philadelphia Player of the Year by the Philadelphia Daily News as well as Catholic League Most Valuable Player. He signed a letter of intent with Villanova on April 14, 2017, joining Dhamir Cosby-Roundtree and Jermaine Samuels in the class of 2021.

== College career ==
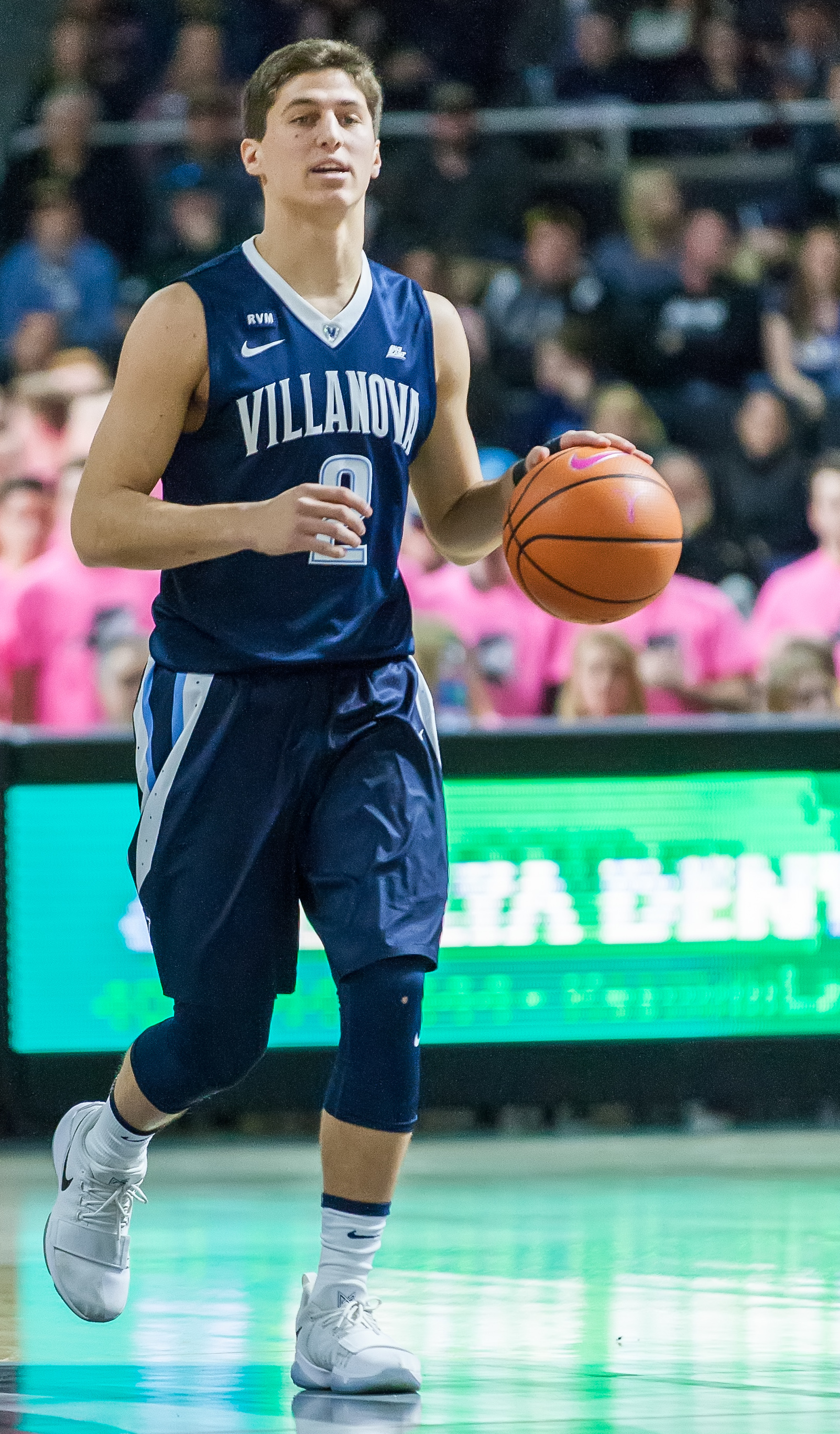
Gillespie in 2018

Gillespie enrolled at Villanova in the fall of 2017, and he wanted to redshirt his freshman year at the school, but coach Jay Wright decided against doing it because Gillespie "was playing above his years." Soon breaking into the rotation, Gillespie scored in double figures in his second collegiate game, but he also had to learn to adjust to the quickness of the college game. Gillespie had to miss more than a month in December and January due to a fractured bone in his left hand sustained in a December 10 practice. However, he returned to action in a January 17 road win over Georgetown. He provided quality minutes and had eight points including two three-pointers in a February 1 win over Creighton due to the absence of Phil Booth with a similar hand injury. Gillespie made his first start on February 10, in an 86–75 win over Butler. In the first round of the NCAA Tournament, Gillespie scored nine points and had a steal in a win versus Radford. He had four points and five rebounds in the 79–62 NCAA championship game win over Michigan. He averaged 4.3 points per game in 14.4 minutes per game. Gillespie posted a 2.6-to-1 assist to turnover ratio, which Wright attributed to him thinking about his teammates and trying to make them better.

Gillespie scored a season-high 30 points in a 77–65 win against Georgetown on February 3, 2019. On March 9, he had 22 points in a 79–75 loss to Seton Hall. As a sophomore, Gillespie averaged 10.9 points per game.

Coming into his junior season, Gillespie broke his nose in practice, forcing him to wear a mask for several games. Gillespie had 27 points and six assists in an 87–78 loss to Baylor in the championship game of the Myrtle Beach Classic. He was named to the All-Tournament Team and Big East player of the week on November 25. On January 28, 2020, Gillespie had his first double-double with 17 points and a career-high 13 rebounds in a 79–59 win over St. John's. Gillespie scored a season-high 29 points on February 16, in a 76–56 win over Temple. At the conclusion of the regular season, Gillespie was selected to the Second Team All-Big East. He averaged 15.1 points, 4.5 assists, and 1.2 steals per game on a team that finished 24–7.

Coming into his senior season, Gillespie was named to the Bob Cousy Award watchlist as well as Preseason First Team All-Big East. He tore his MCL during a 72–60 win over Creighton on March 3, 2021, ending his season. At the conclusion of the regular season, Gillespie was named Big East co-Player of the Year alongside teammate Jeremiah Robinson-Earl and Seton Hall's Sandro Mamukelashvili. He averaged 14 points and 4.6 assists per game. Gillespie decided to take advantage of the additional season of eligibility granted by the NCAA due to the COVID-19 pandemic.

On February 15, 2022, Gillespie scored a career-high 33 points despite playing on a swollen ankle in an 89–84 win at Providence. He was named outright Big East Player of the Year for the 2021–22 season.

== Professional career ==
=== Denver Nuggets / Grand Rapids Gold (2022–2024) ===
After going undrafted in the 2022 NBA draft, Gillespie signed a two-way contract with the Denver Nuggets. Gillespie joined the Nuggets' 2022 NBA Summer League team. In his Summer League debut, Gillespie scored 11 points, six rebounds, and four assists in a 78–85 loss to the Minnesota Timberwolves. In four Summer League games, he averaged 11.3 points, 5.3 rebounds, and 4.3 assists per game.

On July 30, 2022, the Nuggets announced that Gillespie had undergone surgery for a lower leg fracture and that he would be out indefinitely. Gillespie ended his rookie season as an NBA champion when the Nuggets beat the Miami Heat in the 2023 NBA Finals, albeit without making his NBA debut.

On July 18, 2023, Gillespie re-signed with the Denver Nuggets on another two-way contract.

=== Phoenix Suns (2024–present) ===
==== 2024–25 season ====
On July 2, 2024, Gillespie signed a two-way contract with the Phoenix Suns. Gillespie would make his Phoenix Suns debut on October 26, with the Suns winning 114–102 over the defending Western Conference champion Dallas Mavericks in Phoenix's home opener.

Gillespie recorded a season-high 10 points on 4-of-6 shooting, including 2-for-3 from 3-point range, in the team's 23-point comeback win against the Los Angeles Clippers on March 4, 2025. His point total, along with three assists and two rebounds, came in 15 minutes of playing time during the third and fourth quarters. Gillespie's play style during the game drew comparisons to Suns great Steve Nash. Gillespie made his first career start on March 17 against the Toronto Raptors, ending the game with three points on 1-of-4 shooting.

==== 2025–26 season ====
On July 2, 2025, Gillespie re-signed with the Suns on a one-year, $2.3 million contract. On November 21, Gillespie scored the game-winning jumper with 6.4 seconds remaining in a 114–113 win over the Minnesota Timberwolves. On February 3, 2026, he scored a career-high 30 points in a 130–125 win over the Portland Trail Blazers. On April 2, Gillespie set the franchise record for most made three-pointers in a season, surpassing Quentin Richardson's previous record of 226 which was set during the 2004–05 season.

During the 2025–26 season, Gillespie averaged career-highs in nearly every major statistical category, including points per game (12.7), minutes per game (28.5), assists per game (4.6), and games started (58). He helped the Suns clinch a 45–37 record and the eighth seed in the playoffs after a play-in tournament win over the Golden State Warriors, a successful turnaround for the team after a 2024–25 season that saw them miss the playoffs. The Suns faced the reigning champion and top-seeded Oklahoma City Thunder during their first-round series. On April 19, Gillespie made his playoff debut, recording eight points and two assists in a 119–84 Game 1 loss. On April 27, he scored a playoff career-high 20 points in a 131–122 Game 4 loss, which effectively ended the Suns' season in a first-round playoff sweep.

==== 2026–27 season ====
On June 20, 2026, Gillespie re-signed with the Suns on a four-year, $48 million contract.

== National team career ==
In the summer of 2019, Gillespie was a part of the United States National team who competed at the Pan American Games in Peru. The team won bronze, defeating Dominican Republic behind 25 points from Gillespie.

== Career statistics ==
Legend
| GP | Games played | GS | Games started | MPG | Minutes per game |
| FG% | Field goal percentage | 3P% | 3-point field goal percentage | FT% | Free throw percentage |
| RPG | Rebounds per game | APG | Assists per game | SPG | Steals per game |
| BPG | Blocks per game | PPG | Points per game | **Bold** | Career high |

=== NBA ===
==== Regular season ====
| Year | Team | GP | GS | MPG | FG% | 3P% | FT% | RPG | APG | SPG | BPG | PPG |
|---|---|---|---|---|---|---|---|---|---|---|---|---|
| 2023–24 | Denver | 24 | 0 | 9.4 | **.464** | .395 | .667 | .9 | 1.1 | .5 | .0 | 3.6 |
| 2024–25 | Phoenix | 33 | 9 | 14.0 | .430 | **.433** | .864 | 2.4 | 2.4 | .6 | **.2** | 5.9 |
| 2025–26 | Phoenix | **80** | **58** | **28.5** | .418 | .401 | **.874** | **4.1** | **4.6** | **1.2** | **.2** | **12.7** |
| Career | | 137 | 67 | 21.7 | .423 | .405 | .851 | 3.1 | 3.5 | 1.0 | .2 | 9.4 |

==== Playoffs ====
| Year | Team | GP | GS | MPG | FG% | 3P% | FT% | RPG | APG | SPG | BPG | PPG |
|---|---|---|---|---|---|---|---|---|---|---|---|---|
| 2026 | Phoenix | 4 | 3 | 28.5 | .444 | .400 | .000 | 5.0 | 3.8 | 1.3 | .3 | 10.5 |
| Career | | 4 | 3 | 28.5 | .444 | .400 | .000 | 5.0 | 3.8 | 1.3 | .3 | 10.5 |

=== College ===
| Year | Team | GP | GS | MPG | FG% | 3P% | FT% | RPG | APG | SPG | BPG | PPG |
|---|---|---|---|---|---|---|---|---|---|---|---|---|
| 2017–18 | Villanova | 32 | 1 | 14.4 | **.452** | .394 | .800 | 1.3 | 1.1 | .6 | **.1** | 4.3 |
| 2018–19 | Villanova | 35 | 35 | 29.4 | .409 | .379 | .839 | 2.4 | 2.8 | 1.1 | **.1** | 10.9 |
| 2019–20 | Villanova | 31 | 31 | 34.1 | .406 | .357 | .817 | 3.7 | 4.5 | **1.2** | **.1** | 15.1 |
| 2020–21 | Villanova | 20 | 20 | 33.4 | .428 | .376 | .833 | 3.3 | **4.6** | 1.0 | .0 | 14.0 |
| 2021–22 | Villanova | **38** | **38** | **34.2** | .434 | **.415** | **.905** | **3.8** | 3.2 | 1.0 | .0 | **15.6** |
| Career | | 156 | 125 | 28.9 | .422 | .387 | .848 | 2.9 | 3.1 | 1.0 | .0 | 11.9 |
