= Brandon Slater =

American basketball player (born 1999)

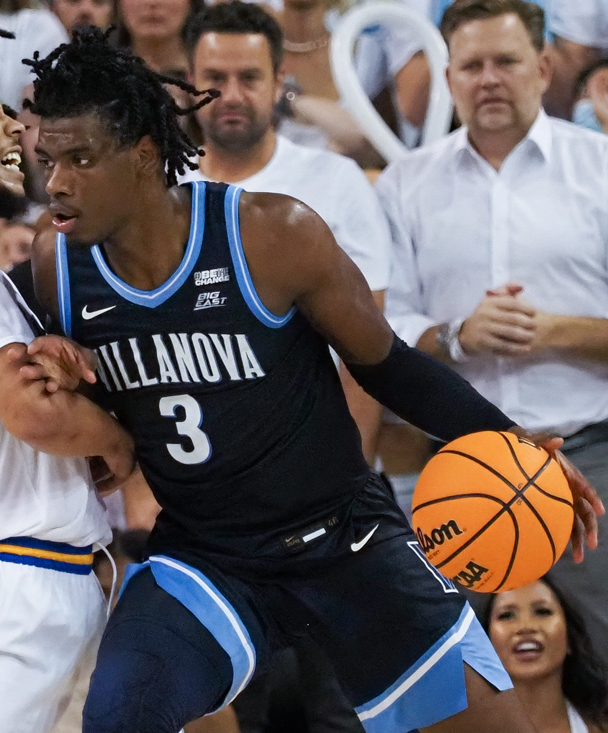
- Slater with Villanova in 2021

No. 34 – Benfica
- Position: Power forward
- League: Liga Portuguesa de Basquetebol

Personal information
- Born: September 14, 1999 (age 27) Centreville, Virginia, U.S.
- Listed height: 6 ft 8 in (2.03 m)
- Listed weight: 220 lb (100 kg)

Career information
- High school: Paul VI Catholic (Fairfax, Virginia)
- College: Villanova (2018–2023)
- NBA draft: 2023: undrafted
- Playing career: 2023–present

Career history
- 2023–2024: Maine Celtics
- 2024–2025: Lavrio
- 2025–2026: Greensboro Swarm
- 2026: Knox Raiders
- 2026–present: Benfica
- Stats at NBA.com
- Stats at Basketball Reference

James Brandon Slater (born September 14, 1999) is an American professional basketball player for Benfica of the Liga Portuguesa de Basquetebol. He played college basketball for the Villanova Wildcats of the Big East Conference.

== High school career ==
Slater played basketball for Paul VI Catholic High School in Fairfax, Virginia. At Paul VI, he was teammates with Trevor Keels and Jeremy Roach. As a junior, Slater averaged 15.2 points, seven rebounds and three assists per game. His senior season was cut short by a broken left hand. Slater competed for Team Takeover on the Amateur Athletic Union circuit, playing alongside his future college teammate Justin Moore. A consensus four-star recruit, he committed to playing college basketball for Villanova over offers from Maryland, South Carolina and Miami (Florida).

== College career ==
Slater had a limited role during his first three seasons at Villanova. As a junior, he averaged 3.8 points and 2.2 rebounds in 16.8 minutes per game. He entered the starting lineup in his senior season. On November 16, 2021, Slater scored 23 points in a 100–81 win against Howard. He averaged 8.5 points and 3.7 rebounds per game as a senior, helping the Wildcats reach the Final Four. Slater opted to return for his fifth season of eligibility, taking advantage of the NCAA's decision to offer an additional season due to the COVID-19 pandemic. In 2022–23, he averaged 9.7 points and 4.7 rebounds in 29.0 minutes per game across 34 appearances (all starts) for the Wildcats.

== Professional career ==
=== Maine Celtics (2023–2024) ===
Slater went undrafted in the 2023 NBA draft. On September 26, 2023, he signed with the Boston Celtics, only to be waived two days later. He subsequently joined the Maine Celtics of the NBA G League for the 2023–24 season. In 51 games, he averaged 7.3 points, 2.7 rebounds and 1.1 assists per game.

Slater joined the Charlotte Hornets for the 2024 NBA Summer League.

=== Lavrio Megabolt (2024–2025) ===
On August 3, 2024, Slater signed with Lavrio Megabolt of the Greek Basketball League. In 24 games during the 2024–25 season, he averaged 7.4 points and 3.0 rebounds per game.

=== Grensboro Swarm (2025–2026) ===
On September 19, 2025, Slater signed with the Charlotte Hornets, only to be waived the following day. He subsequently joined the Greensboro Swarm for the 2025–26 NBA G League season. On February 21, 2026, he was waived by the Swarm. In 21 games, he averaged 6.1 points and 3.1 rebounds per game.

=== Knox Raiders (2026) ===
On March 2, 2026, Slater signed with the Knox Raiders of the NBL1 South for the 2026 NBL1 season.

=== Benfica (2026–present) ===
On August 4, 2026, he signed with Benfica of the Liga Portuguesa de Basquetebol.

== Career statistics ==
Legend
GP	Games played	GS	Games started	MPG	Minutes per game
FG%	Field goal percentage	3P%	3-point field goal percentage	FT%	Free throw percentage
RPG	Rebounds per game	APG	Assists per game	SPG	Steals per game
BPG	Blocks per game	PPG	Points per game	**Bold**	Career high

=== College ===
Year	Team	GP	GS	MPG	FG%	3P%	FT%	RPG	APG	SPG	BPG	PPG
2018–19	Villanova	15	0	3.5	.222	.000	.000	.6	.1	.1	.2	.3
2019–20	Villanova	31	0	11.6	.377	.150	.400	1.3	.7	.4	.2	1.6
2020–21	Villanova	25	2	16.8	**.493**	**.417**	.600	2.2	.5	.8	.2	3.8
2021–22	Villanova	**38**	**38**	**30.1**	.478	.337	.881	3.7	**1.6**	**1.1**	.3	8.5
2022–23	Villanova	34	34	29.0	.452	.347	**.918**	**4.7**	1.4	.9	**.4**	**9.7**
Career		143	74	20.7	.456	.325	.820	2.8	1.0	.7	.3	5.6
