= Cole Swider =

American basketball player (born 1999)

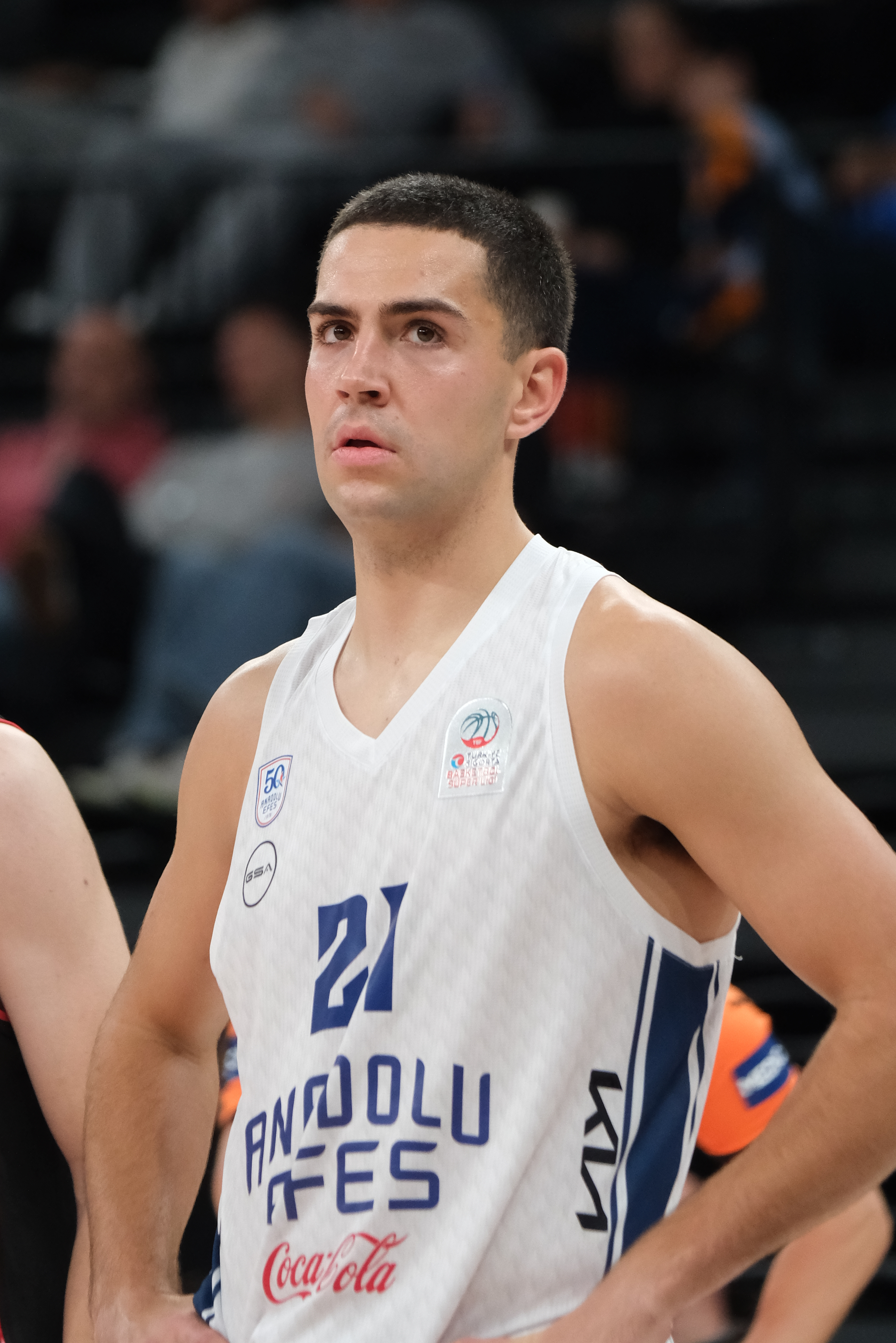
- Swider with Anadolu Efes in 2025

No. 21 – Coachella Valley Lakers
- Position: Power forward / small forward
- League: NBA G League

Personal information
- Born: May 8, 1999 (age 27) Portsmouth, Rhode Island, U.S.
- Listed height: 6 ft 8 in (2.03 m)
- Listed weight: 220 lb (100 kg)

Career information
- High school: St. Andrew's School (Barrington, Rhode Island)
- College: Villanova (2018–2021); Syracuse (2021–2022)
- NBA draft: 2022: undrafted
- Playing career: 2022–present

Career history
- 2022–2023: Los Angeles Lakers
- 2022–2023: →South Bay Lakers
- 2023–2024: Miami Heat
- 2023–2024: →Sioux Falls Skyforce
- 2024–2025: Detroit Pistons
- 2024–2025: →Motor City Cruise
- 2025: South Bay Lakers
- 2025: Toronto Raptors
- 2025–2026: Anadolu Efes
- 2026–present: Coachella Valley Lakers

Career highlights
- NBA G League Next Up Game (2024)
- Stats at NBA.com
- Stats at Basketball Reference

Cole Alexander Swider (/ˈswaɪdər/ SWY-dər; born May 8, 1999) is an American professional basketball player for the Coachella Valley Lakers of the NBA G League. He played college basketball for the Villanova Wildcats and the Syracuse Orange.

== Early life ==
Swider grew up in Portsmouth, Rhode Island and attended the St. Andrew's School. Swider was named the Rhode Island Gatorade Player of the Year as a junior after averaging 26.5 points, 11.2 rebounds, 3.1 assists, 1.9 steals, and 1.3 blocks per game. He averaged 31 points per game in his senior season. Swider was rated a four-star recruit and committed to play college basketball at Villanova over offers from Syracuse, Xavier and Duke.

== College career ==
Swider began his collegiate career at Villanova. He played in 31 games and started 15 during his sophomore season and averaged 6.1 points and 2.9 rebounds. As a junior, he played in all 25 of Villanova's games and averaged 5.7 points and 2.8 rebounds per game. After the season, Swider entered the NCAA transfer portal.

Swider ultimately transferred to Syracuse. He became the Orange's starting power forward and averaged 13.9 points, 6.8 rebounds, and 1.8 assists per game. Following the end of the season, Swider announced that he would be entering the 2022 NBA draft and hiring an agent.

== Professional career ==
=== Los Angeles / South Bay Lakers (2022–2023) ===
After going undrafted in the 2022 NBA draft, Swider signed a two-way contract with the Los Angeles Lakers on July 1, 2022, splitting time with their G League affiliate, the South Bay Lakers. Swider joined the L.A. Lakers' 2022 NBA Summer League roster. In his Summer League debut, Swider scored thirteen points, six rebounds and a block in a 100–66 win against the Miami Heat. On July 26, 2023, Swider was waived by the Lakers.

=== Miami Heat / Sioux Falls Skyforce (2023–2024) ===
On August 11, 2023, Swider signed with the Miami Heat and on October 21, his deal was converted into a two-way contract.

=== Detroit Pistons / Motor City Cruise (2024–2025) ===
On August 8, 2024, Swider signed with the Indiana Pacers, but was waived on October 18. Three days later, he signed a two-way contract with the Detroit Pistons. However, he was waived on January 6, 2025.

=== Return to South Bay (2025) ===
On February 19, 2025, Swider was acquired by the South Bay Lakers via a trade with Motor City Cruise. The next day Swider put up a season-high 36 points in a 123-112 loss against the Rip City Remix.

=== Toronto Raptors (2025) ===
On March 26, 2025, Swider signed a 10-day contract with the Toronto Raptors. On April 5, Swider re-signed with Toronto for the remainder of the season. In 8 games for the Raptors, he averaged 7.4 points, 3.1 rebounds, and 0.3 assists. On April 10, Swider was waived by Toronto.

=== Anadolu Efes (2025–2026) ===
On August 11, 2025, Swider signed with the Turkish Anadolu Efes of the Basketbol Süper Ligi (BSL) and the EuroLeague.

=== Coachella Valley Lakers (2026–present) ===
On September 27, 2026, Swider signed with the Los Angeles Lakers. He was waived on October 14. Swider subsequently joined the Coachella Valley Lakers.

== Career statistics ==
Legend
GP	Games played	GS	Games started	MPG	Minutes per game
FG%	Field goal percentage	3P%	3-point field goal percentage	FT%	Free throw percentage
RPG	Rebounds per game	APG	Assists per game	SPG	Steals per game
BPG	Blocks per game	PPG	Points per game	**Bold**	Career high

=== College ===
Year	Team	GP	GS	MPG	FG%	3P%	FT%	RPG	APG	SPG	BPG	PPG
2018–19	Villanova	21	0	9.5	.375	.283	.632	1.2	.6	.1	.0	3.5
2019–20	Villanova	31	15	18.5	**.442**	.352	.667	2.9	.6	.2	.3	6.1
2020–21	Villanova	25	2	18.8	.426	.402	.750	2.8	1.1	.5	.1	5.7
2021–22	Syracuse	**33**	**33**	**34.3**	.440	**.411**	**.866**	**6.8**	**1.4**	**1.0**	**.4**	**13.9**
Career		110	50	21.7	.432	.381	.794	3.7	.9	.5	.2	7.8

=== NBA ===
Year	Team	GP	GS	MPG	FG%	3P%	FT%	RPG	APG	SPG	BPG	PPG
2022–23	L.A. Lakers	7	0	5.9	.333	**.375**	—	1.0	**.6**	.0	.0	1.3
2023–24	Miami	**18**	0	4.8	**.395**	.333	**1.000**	.4	.3	.1	.1	2.3
2024–25	Detroit	2	0	6.5	.000	.000	—	1.0	.5	.0	.0	.0
2024–25	Toronto	8	0	**19.6**	.379	.357	.000	**3.1**	.3	**.5**	**.3**	**7.4**
Career		35	0	8.5	.364	.329	.667	1.2	.3	.1	.1	3.1
