= Scottie Lewis =

American basketball player (born 2000)

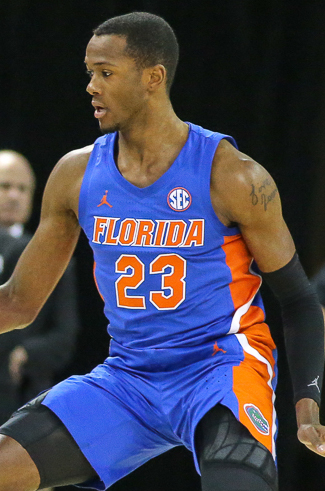
- Lewis in January 2020

Free agent
- Position: Shooting guard

Personal information
- Born: March 12, 2000 (age 26) The Bronx, New York, U.S.
- Listed height: 6 ft 5 in (1.96 m)
- Listed weight: 185 lb (84 kg)

Career information
- High school: Ranney School (Tinton Falls, New Jersey)
- College: Florida (2019–2021)
- NBA draft: 2021: 2nd round, 56th overall pick
- Drafted by: Charlotte Hornets
- Playing career: 2021–present

Career history
- 2021–2022: Charlotte Hornets
- 2021–2022: →Greensboro Swarm
- 2024: Rip City Remix
- 2024: Salt Lake City Stars
- 2024–2025: Niagara River Lions
- 2026: Johor Southern Tigers

Career highlights
- CEBL champion (2024); SEC All-Freshman Team (2020); McDonald's All-American (2019)
- Stats at NBA.com
- Stats at Basketball Reference

George Scott Lewis Jr. (born March 12, 2000) is an American professional basketball player who last played for Johor Southern Tigers of the Major Basketball League Malaysia. He played college basketball for the Florida Gators.

== High school career ==
Lewis played high school basketball for the Ranney School in Tinton Falls, New Jersey. He was unanimously ranked as a 5-star recruit from all major recruiting services for the class of 2019. On January 20, 2019, Lewis committed to the University of Florida. He is originally from The Bronx, New York and resides in Hazlet, New Jersey.

=== Recruiting ===
On October 2, 2018, Lewis announced that he will be playing college basketball at the University of Florida, choosing the Gators over Kentucky.

College recruiting
| Name | Hometown | School | Height | Weight | Commit date |
|---|---|---|---|---|---|
| Scottie Lewis; SF | Hazlet, NJ | Ranney School (NJ) | 6 ft 5 in (1.96 m) | 185 lb (84 kg) | Oct 2, 2018 |
| Scottie Lewis; SF | Recruit ratings: Rivals: 247Sports: ESPN: (96) | | | | |
Overall recruit ranking: Rivals: 8 247Sports: 7 ESPN: 10
Note: In many cases, Scout, Rivals, 247Sports, On3, and ESPN may conflict in their listings of height and weight.; In these cases, the average was taken. ESPN grades are on a 100-point scale.; Sources: "Florida 2019 Basketball Commitments". Rivals.; "2019 Florida Gators Recruiting Class". ESPN.; "2019 Team Ranking". Rivals.

== College career ==
In his first game in a Florida uniform, Lewis had nine points, five rebounds and two assists as the Gators defeated North Florida 74–59. On February 26, 2020, Lewis scored 18 points in an 81–66 win against LSU. He had a career-high 19 points on March 7, in a 71–70 loss to Kentucky. At the conclusion of the regular season, Lewis was named to the SEC All-Freshman Team. Lewis averaged 8.5 points and 3.6 rebounds per game, leading the team in blocks (36) and finishing second to Keyontae Johnson in steals with 36. On April 6, 2020, it was announced that Lewis would return to Florida for the 2020–21 season. He missed three games as a sophomore after contracting COVID-19. Lewis averaged 7.9 points, 3.1 rebounds and 1.6 steals per game. Following the season, he declared for the 2021 NBA draft and hired an agent.

== Professional career ==
=== Charlotte Hornets (2021–2022) ===
Lewis was selected in the second round of the 2021 NBA draft with the 56th pick by the Charlotte Hornets. On August 3, 2021, the Hornets signed him to a two-way contract for the 2021–22 season. Under the terms of the deal, he split time between the Hornets and their NBA G League affiliate, the Greensboro Swarm. On June 29, 2022, the Hornets declined to sign Lewis to a qualifying offer, making him an unrestricted free agent.

Lewis joined the Hornets for the 2022 NBA Summer League. On July 7, 2022, he broke his left leg during a practice session. He underwent surgery to address the injury the next day and was ruled out indefinitely.

On October 28, 2023, Lewis was selected in the 2023 NBA G League draft by the Windy City Bulls, but was waived on November 8.

=== Rip City Remix (2024) ===
On January 21, 2024, Lewis joined the Rip City Remix, but was waived nine days later.

=== Salt Lake City Stars (2024) ===
On February 6, 2024, Lewis joined the Salt Lake City Stars.

=== Niagara River Lions (2024) ===
On July 10, 2024, Lewis signed with the Niagara River Lions of the Canadian Elite Basketball League.

== Career statistics ==
Legend
| GP | Games played | GS | Games started | MPG | Minutes per game |
| FG% | Field goal percentage | 3P% | 3-point field goal percentage | FT% | Free throw percentage |
| RPG | Rebounds per game | APG | Assists per game | SPG | Steals per game |
| BPG | Blocks per game | PPG | Points per game | **Bold** | Career high |

=== NBA ===
| Year | Team | GP | GS | MPG | FG% | 3P% | FT% | RPG | APG | SPG | BPG | PPG |
|---|---|---|---|---|---|---|---|---|---|---|---|---|
| 2021–22 | Charlotte | 2 | 0 | 3.5 | — | — | .500 | .0 | .5 | .5 | .0 | .5 |
| Career | | 2 | 0 | 3.5 | — | — | .500 | .0 | .5 | .5 | .0 | .5 |

=== College ===
| Year | Team | GP | GS | MPG | FG% | 3P% | FT% | RPG | APG | SPG | BPG | PPG |
|---|---|---|---|---|---|---|---|---|---|---|---|---|
| 2019–20 | Florida | **30** | **22** | **29.1** | .441 | **.361** | **.817** | **3.6** | .8 | 1.2 | **1.2** | **8.5** |
| 2020–21 | Florida | 21 | 9 | 25.6 | **.445** | .318 | .673 | 3.1 | **1.5** | **1.6** | 1.0 | 7.9 |
| Career | | 51 | 31 | 27.6 | .443 | .343 | .759 | 3.4 | 1.1 | 1.4 | 1.1 | 8.2 |
