= Jeremiah Robinson-Earl =

American basketball player (born 2000)

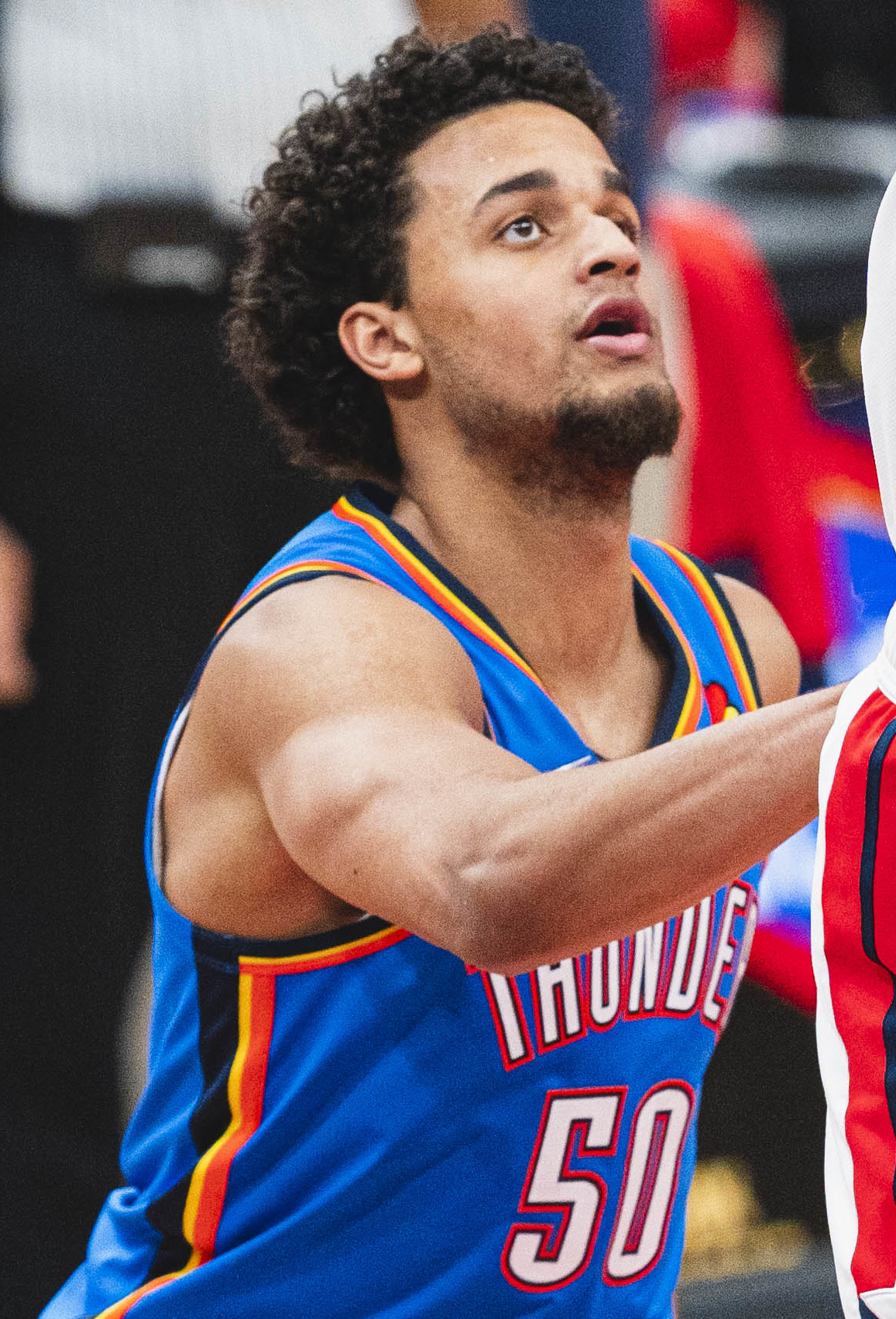
- Robinson-Earl with the Oklahoma City Thunder in 2022

No. 3 – Aris Thessaloniki
- Position: Small forward / power forward
- League: GBL; EuroCup

Personal information
- Born: November 3, 2000 (age 25) Kansas City, Kansas, U.S.
- Listed height: 6 ft 9 in (2.06 m)
- Listed weight: 240 lb (109 kg)

Career information
- High school: Bishop Miege (Roeland Park, Kansas); IMG Academy (Bradenton, Florida)
- College: Villanova (2019–2021)
- NBA draft: 2021: 2nd round, 32nd overall pick
- Drafted by: New York Knicks
- Playing career: 2021–present

Career history
- 2021–2023: Oklahoma City Thunder
- 2022, 2023: →Oklahoma City Blue
- 2023–2025: New Orleans Pelicans
- 2025: Indiana Pacers
- 2025–2026: Texas Legends
- 2026: Dallas Mavericks
- 2026–present: Aris Thessaloniki

Career highlights
- Third-team All-American – NABC, SN (2021); Big East co-Player of the Year (2021); First-team All-Big East (2021); Big East Freshman of the Year (2020); Big East All-Freshman Team (2020); McDonald's All-American (2019)
- Stats at NBA.com
- Stats at Basketball Reference
Medals
Men's basketball
Representing United States
FIBA Under-19 World Cup
Gold medal – first place	2019 Greece	Team
FIBA Americas U18 Championship
Gold medal – first place	2018 Canada	Team

Jeremiah Christian Robinson-Earl (born November 3, 2000) is an American professional basketball player for Aris Thessaloniki of the Greek Basketball League (GBL) and the EuroCup. He played college basketball for the Villanova Wildcats.

== High school career ==
Robinson-Earl played his first three years of high school basketball for Bishop Miege High School in Roeland Park, Kansas. As a freshman in 2015–16, he started in all 25 games and averaged 12.4 points to help his team to a 22–3 record. As a sophomore in 2016–17, his team finished with a 22–3 slate. He averaged 14.2 points, 8.4 rebounds, 2.5 assists, 1.3 blocks, and 1.3 steals per game on a team that won a state title. He was a 2017 Wichita Eagle All-State selection and received a scholarship offer from Kansas. As a junior in 2017–18, he started all 25 games and averaged 21.3 points, 8.1 rebounds, 2.3 assists, and 1.3 steals in leading his team to a 22–3 record and a third consecutive state title. After his three years at Bishop Miege, Robinson-Earl transferred to IMG Academy for his senior year.

=== Recruiting ===
Robinson-Earl was a consensus five-star recruit and one of the top players in the 2019 class. On October 30, 2018, he committed to play college basketball for Villanova over offers from Arizona, Kansas, North Carolina, and Notre Dame.

College recruiting
Name	Hometown	School	Height	Weight	Commit date
Jeremiah Robinson-Earl; PF	Kansas City, KS	IMG Academy (FL)	6 ft 9 in (2.06 m)	235 lb (107 kg)	Oct 30, 2018
Jeremiah Robinson-Earl; PF	Recruit ratings: Rivals: 247Sports: ESPN: (95)				
Overall recruit ranking: Rivals: 11 247Sports: 18 ESPN: 14
Note: In many cases, Scout, Rivals, 247Sports, On3, and ESPN may conflict in their listings of height and weight.; In these cases, the average was taken. ESPN grades are on a 100-point scale.; Sources: "Villanova 2019 Basketball Commitments". Rivals.; "2019 Villanova Wildcats Recruiting Class". ESPN.; "2019 Team Ranking". Rivals.

== College career ==
Robinson-Earl made his Villanova debut in a 97–54 rout of Army, scoring 24 points and pulling down 13 rebounds. He was named Big East freshman of the week on November 11, 2019. At the conclusion of the regular season, Robinson-Earl was unanimously selected to the Big East Freshman Team. He was named Big East Freshman of the Year after averaging 10.5 points and 9.4 rebounds per game and had nine double-doubles. He was named to the Second Team All-Big 5. Following the season Robinson-Earl declared for the 2020 NBA draft but decided to return to Villanova after he was informed he would be a likely second-round pick.

Coming into his sophomore season, Robinson-Earl was named to the Preseason First Team All-Big East. On November 26, 2020, he scored a career-high 28 points and had eight rebounds in an 83–74 win against Arizona State. As a sophomore, Robinson-Earl averaged 15.7 points, 8.5 rebounds and 2.2 assists per game, and was named Big East co-Player of the Year (alongside Collin Gillespie and Sandro Mamukelashvili). On April 9, 2021, he declared for the 2021 NBA draft, forgoing his remaining college eligibility.

== Professional career ==
=== Oklahoma City Thunder (2021–2023) ===
Robinson-Earl was selected in the second round of the 2021 NBA draft with the 32nd pick by the New York Knicks, and then was traded to the Oklahoma City Thunder for the draft rights to Rokas Jokubaitis and Miles McBride. On August 10, 2021, he signed a contract with the Thunder. Robinson-Earl made 49 appearances (36 starts) for Oklahoma City during his rookie campaign, averaging 7.5 points, 5.6 rebounds, and 1.0 assists.

Robinson-Earl was assigned to the NBA G League on February 3, 2023. He made 43 appearances (20 starts) for the Thunder during the 2022–23 NBA season, posting averages of 6.8 points, 4.2 rebounds, and 1.0 assists.

=== New Orleans Pelicans (2023–2025) ===
On October 17, 2023, Robinson-Earl was traded, along with Victor Oladipo, by the Thunder to the Houston Rockets in exchange for Kevin Porter Jr. and two future second-round draft picks but six days later, he was waived by the Rockets.

On November 3, 2023, Robinson-Earl signed a two-way contract with the New Orleans Pelicans. On February 17, 2024, he signed a standard contract with the Pelicans. Robinson-Earl played in 39 games (including one start) for the Pelicans during the 2023–24 NBA season, averaging 2.9 points, 1.9 rebounds, and 0.5 assists.

Robinson-Earl made 66 appearances (including nine starts) for New Orleans during the 2024–25 NBA season, posting averages of 6.3 points, 4.8 rebounds, and 1.3 assists.

=== Indiana Pacers (2025) ===
Robinson-Earl signed with the Dallas Mavericks on September 26, 2025. He was waived on October 17.

On November 1, 2025, Robinson-Earl signed a 10-day contract with the Indiana Pacers. On November 11, the Pacers signed Robinson-Earl to a second 10-day contract. On November 21, the Pacers signed Robinson-Earl to a two-year, non-guaranteed contract. On December 11, he was waived by the Pacers. In 17 games for the team, he averaged 4.6 points and 5.2 rebounds per game.

=== Texas Legends (2025–2026) ===
On December 17, 2025, Robinson-Earl was acquired by the Texas Legends of the G League.

=== Dallas Mavericks (2026) ===
On January 15, 2026, Robinson-Earl was signed to a 10-day contract by the Dallas Mavericks. Robinson-Earl made five appearances for the Mavericks, recording averages of 4.4 points, 3.0 rebounds, and 0.6 assists.

=== Aris Thessaloniki (2026–present) ===
On July 16, 2026, Robinson-Earl signed with Aris Thessaloniki of the Greek Basketball League (GBL) and the EuroCup.

== National team career ==
Robinson-Earl played for the United States under-18 basketball team at the 2018 FIBA Under-18 Americas Championship in Canada. He helped his team win the gold medal. At the 2019 FIBA Under-19 World Cup in Greece, Robinson-Earl averaged 12.7 points and 6.3 rebounds per game, helping his team win the gold medal.

== Career statistics ==
Legend
GP	Games played	GS	Games started	MPG	Minutes per game
FG%	Field goal percentage	3P%	3-point field goal percentage	FT%	Free throw percentage
RPG	Rebounds per game	APG	Assists per game	SPG	Steals per game
BPG	Blocks per game	PPG	Points per game	**Bold**	Career high

=== NBA ===
==== Regular season ====
Year	Team	GP	GS	MPG	FG%	3P%	FT%	RPG	APG	SPG	BPG	PPG
2021–22	Oklahoma City	49	**36**	**22.2**	.414	**.352**	.741	**5.6**	1.0	**.6**	**.3**	**7.5**
2022–23	Oklahoma City	43	20	18.9	.444	.333	.833	4.2	1.0	**.6**	**.3**	6.8
2023–24	New Orleans	39	1	8.6	**.474**	.333	.750	1.9	.5	.3	.1	2.9
2024–25	New Orleans	**66**	9	18.8	.455	.341	.836	4.8	**1.3**	**.6**	.1	6.3
2025–26	Indiana	17	3	17.6	.349	.242	.929	5.2	.7	.4	.1	4.6
2025–26	Dallas	5	0	12.2	.471	.250	**1.000**	3.0	.6	.4	.0	4.4
Career		219	69	17.5	.434	.335	.811	4.3	1.0	.5	.2	5.9

==== Playoffs ====
Year	Team	GP	GS	MPG	FG%	3P%	FT%	RPG	APG	SPG	BPG	PPG
2024	New Orleans	1	0	5.3	.500	—	.000	1.0	1.0	.0	.0	2.0
Career		1	0	5.3	.500	—	.000	1.0	1.0	.0	.0	2.0

=== College ===
Year	Team	GP	GS	MPG	FG%	3P%	FT%	RPG	APG	SPG	BPG	PPG
2019–20	Villanova	**31**	**31**	32.7	.454	**.328**	**.814**	**9.4**	1.9	**1.1**	.5	10.5
2020–21	Villanova	25	25	**34.5**	**.497**	.280	.714	8.5	**2.2**	1.0	**.6**	**15.7**
Career		56	56	33.5	.478	.301	.768	9.0	2.1	1.1	.6	12.8

== Personal life ==
Robinson-Earl's father, Lester Earl, played college basketball for LSU and Kansas before embarking on a professional career overseas in Spain and Lebanon.

Robinson-Earl also credits his mother, Katie Robinson, as a major inspiration and source of motivation throughout his life, particularly in his decision to continue his education at Villanova University after the COVID-19 pandemic.
