= St. Andrew's School (Rhode Island) =

School in Barrington, Rhode Island, United States

- St. Andrew's School

Location
- 63 Federal Road; Barrington, Bristol County, Rhode Island 02806; United States; 41°44′58″N 71°19′30″W

Information
- School type: Private, Day & Boarding
- Religious affiliation: Non-denominational Christian (Previously Episcopalian)
- Established: 1893
- Founder: William Merrick Chapin
- Head of school: David Tinagero
- Grades: 6-12
- Student to teacher ratio: 5:1
- Yearbook: The Andrean
- Affiliation: New England Association of Schools and Colleges
- Website: www.standrews-ri.org

St. Andrew's School (founded in 1893) is a nondenominational boarding and day school on a 100-acre (0.40 km^{2}) campus in Barrington, Rhode Island, serving co-educational grades 6-12 and postgraduate (PG). It is a member of the New England Association of Schools and Colleges (NEASC) and an International Baccalaureate school.

== Notable alumni ==
- Michael Carter-Williams (born 1991), basketball player, last played for the Orlando Magic of the National Basketball Association (NBA)
- Bonzie Colson (born 1996), basketball player for Maccabi Tel Aviv of the Israeli Basketball Premier League
- Ricky Ledo, Turkish League basketball player for Yeşilgiresun Belediye
- Demetris Nichols, former basketball player
- Andrew Robinson, actor, known for playing the Cardassian spy Elim Garak on Star Trek: Deep Space Nine
- Rakim Sanders, basketball player for Hapoel Gilboa Galil in Israel
- Cole Swider (born 1999), basketball player for the Los Angeles Lakers of the NBA
