= Rivers School =

Prep school in Weston, Massachusetts, US

The Rivers School

Location
- 333 Winter Street; Weston, Massachusetts 02493; United States; 42°19′23″N 71°19′34″W

Information
- Former names: Country Day School for Boys of Boston; Rivers Country Day School
- Type: Independent, Day
- Motto: Excellence with Humanity
- Established: 1915; 111 years ago
- Founder: Robert W. Rivers
- Head of school: Ryan S. Dahlem
- Teaching staff: 74.8 (FTE) (2015–16)
- Grades: 6-12
- Gender: Coeducational
- Enrollment: 536 (2025-26)
- Average class size: 11 students
- Student to teacher ratio: 6:1
- Campus size: 55 acres
- Campus type: Suburban
- Athletics conference: Independent School League
- Mascot: Redwing
- Teams: 58 (Varsity, JV, Thirds, and Middle School)
- Team name: Redwings
- Publication: Riparian
- Newspaper: The Rivers Edge
- Endowment: $48.8 million (June 30, 2025)
- Tuition: $66,140 (2025-26)
- Website: www.rivers.org

The Rivers School is an independent, coeducational preparatory school in Weston, Massachusetts.

== History ==
Rivers School was founded in 1915 as an educational institution for boys in Brookline, Massachusetts. Robert W. Rivers founded the school and was its first headmaster. The Country Day School for Boys of Boston merged with Rivers in 1940, and the school moved to its present location in Weston in 1960. It became co-educational in 1989.

== The Rivers School Conservatory ==
Logo of the Rivers School Conservatory

The Rivers School Conservatory was founded in 1975 by Ethel Bernard, one of the pioneers of the music school movement. She approached Rivers School with the idea of using the then-unoccupied former headmaster's house on the campus (now called Blackwell House after George H. Blackwell).

It was first called the Music School at Rivers, then Rivers School Conservatory. In 1978, the Annual Seminar on Contemporary Music for the Young was established, with guests including John Cage (1983). All pieces performed are composed in the 25-years prior to each seminar. Recent examples include Matinee: The Fantom of the Fair by Libby Larsen.

The Conservatory currently has more than 1,300 students, including a student orchestra program, jazz and chamber ensembles, music theory and composition, a marimba program, choruses, master classes, workshops, and private lessons for instruments, piano, and voice.

== Clubs and co-curriculars ==
- The robotics team Architects competed in the FIRST Tech Challenge, under the team number 4176.

== Notable alumni ==
- Jack Lemmon ’39, actor
- John T. Noonan, Jr. '44, judge
- David Steinberg '46, professor of Asian Studies
- Frederick Wiseman '47, documentary filmmaker
- David Lamb '51, reporter
- Glen W. Bowersock ’53, historian
- Richard G. Darman ’60, director of the Office of Management and Budget (1989–1993)
- David Sutherland '63, documentary filmmaker
- Joseph I. Banner ’71, football team owner
- Philip Goldberg '74, The US Assistant Secretary of State for Intelligence and Research
- Josh Kraft '85, philanthropist
- Jon Anik '97, television host
- Stephen Belichick '06, football player
- Jillian Dempsey ’09, ice hockey player
- Charlie Rugg '09, soccer player
- Elliot Richardson, member of Nixon and Ford cabinets
- Tayra Meléndez '14, basketball player
- Jermaine Samuels ’17, basketball player
- Collin Graf '20, ice hockey player
