= Ranney School =

Prep school in Tinton Falls, New Jersey, US

- An Aerial View of the Ranney School campus in Tinton Falls, New Jersey.

Location
- 235 Hope Road; Tinton Falls, Monmouth County, New Jersey 07724; United States; 40.3091°N 74.0776°W

Information
- Type: Private
- Motto: Latin: Nil sine magno vita labore dedit mortalibus (Life grants nothing to mortals without great work)
- Religious affiliation: Nonsectarian
- Established: 1960
- Founder: Russell G. Ranney
- Status: Currently operational
- CEEB code: 311336
- NCES School ID: 00868892
- Head of school: John Griffith
- Faculty: 76 FTEs
- Enrollment: 686 (plus 37 in PreK, as of 2021–22)
- Student to teacher ratio: 9:1
- Campus size: 60 acres (24 ha)
- Colors: Navy Blue & White
- Athletics: 29 Interscholastic teams
- Athletics conference: Shore Conference
- Mascot: Panthers
- Accreditation: Middle States Association of Colleges and Schools
- SAT average: Middle 50% Reading 520–670; Math 540–670; Writing 550–690
- Publication: RSVP, The Mag, Taxi
- Newspaper: The Torch
- Yearbook: Horizons
- Endowment: $462,093
- Tuition: $40,520 to $41,910 (upper school for 2025–26)
- Website: www.ranneyschool.org

Ranney School is an independent coeducational, college preparatory day school for students from age 3 (referred to as "Beginners") through twelfth grade located in Tinton Falls in Monmouth County, in the U.S. state of New Jersey.

== History ==
The school was founded in 1960 by educator Russell G. Ranney to help improve students' college board grades.

As of the 2021–22 school year, the school had an enrollment of 686 students (plus 37 in PreK) and 76 classroom teachers (on an FTE basis), for a student–teacher ratio of 9:1. The school's student body was 100% (686) two or more races.

Tuition for the 2025–26 school year ranges from $28,040 for grades K–5 to $41,910 for grades 6–12.

The school's third headmaster retired at the end of the 2012–2013 school year, after 20 years of service to the school. Since July 1, 2013, Dr. John W. Griffith has been the school's fourth headmaster.

== Governance ==
The school is a member of the National Association of Independent Schools and the New Jersey Association of Independent Schools. The school has been accredited by the Middle States Association of Colleges and Schools Commission on Elementary and Secondary Schools since 1994 and is accredited until January 2027.

== Extracurricular activities ==
The school's student life programs include 20+ sports, 40+ clubs, 10+ Honor Societies, visual arts, and performing arts.

=== Athletics ===
The Ranney Panthers compete in Division B Central of the Shore Conference, an athletic conference comprised of private and public high schools in Monmouth and Ocean counties along the Jersey Shore. The conference operates under the supervision of the New Jersey State Interscholastic Athletic Association (NJSIAA). With 220 students in grades 10-12, NJSIAA classified the school for the 2019–20 school year as Non-Public B for most athletic competition purposes, which included schools with an enrollment of 37 to 366 students in that grade range (equivalent to Group I for public schools). The school also competes against other New Jersey and New York City area private schools.

The school participates in a joint cooperative football team with Mater Dei High School as the host school/lead agency. St. John Vianney High School is the host school for a co-op ice hockey team. These co-op programs operate under agreements scheduled to expire at the end of the 2023–24 school year.

The school has won more than 30 individual and team championships in five years, including swimming, tennis, basketball, fencing, and more. In 2011, the Ranney boys épée team won the state championship, the school's first state title in any sport. In 2012 and 2013, the Varsity Girls' Tennis team won the NJSIAA Non-Public B South Championship.

In its first year in the Shore Conference as a B-Central Division member, 2012–2013, Ranney received the School of the Year and Coach of the Year Awards. Ranney Athletics are present in all divisions, Lower, Middle, and Upper School, including twice-weekly swim practice, an after-school RanneyPlus program, and a weekend Panther Cubs program for younger students. The school also has a crew team and an equestrian club.

The girls' fencing team has won two individual foil titles in 2014 and 2016.

The boys' basketball team won the Non-Public Group B state championship in 2019, defeating Roselle Catholic High School by a score of 56-50 in the tournament final at the RWJBarnabas Health Arena, having lost to Roselle Catholic in the Non-Public B finals a year before on a last-second basket. Ranney came into its first Tournament of Champions as the top seed, winning against number-five seed Moorestown High School by 62-40 in the semifinals and won vs. second-seeded Bergen Catholic High School in the championship game by a score of 67-63 to finish the season with a 31-3 record.

In 2024, Rachel Lasda, girls lacrosse coach and science teacher, joined the Latvian national lacrosse team. Professionally, Lasda has competed in multiple World Championships with the Latvian Women's National Lacrosse Team as a player and assistant coach since 2013 when she first began at Ranney.

Ranney's John Welch won the Shore Conference Boys Golf Tournament in April 2024.

== Campus ==
The Ranney Upper School building, housing the majority of classes for grades 6 through 12.

The 60-acre (24 ha) campus features assembly spaces and media centers, a music wing, two dining halls, two libraries, robotics labs, Innovation Labs (makerspaces), a finance lab featuring 12 Bloomberg terminals, and athletic facilities including tennis courts, a track, two gymnasiums, an indoor 25-meter swimming pool, a 415-capacity outdoor grandstand and press box, training and conditioning facilities and fields for soccer, lacrosse, baseball, and softball.

== Controversies ==
=== James Paroline case ===
In 2014, James Paroline was employed by Ranney School as a sports activity specialist for its summer camp program. On August 22, 2014, a minor student who was supposed to be taken home by the camp bus was instead missing for several hours on the school grounds. Legal complaints allege that, during this time, Paroline sexually abused the student. Paroline was later arrested in July 2015 following an unrelated federal investigation, during which he reportedly confessed to sexually abusing children at Ranney and other institutions, and identified multiple alleged victims.

Subsequent civil litigation accused Ranney School of negligence. The plaintiff’s case stated the school failed to properly supervise the child, did not ensure he boarded the correct bus, failed to account for his whereabouts when missing, and allowed him to be alone with Paroline under circumstances that were contrary to school policy and posed a danger to the child. The lawsuit contended that these failures contributed to the circumstances in which the abuse occurred.

The parties ultimately reached a confidential settlement in 2024, with all claims against the school and its employees being dismissed with prejudice.

=== Basketball program ===
In 2018, questions were raised about potential NCAA violations related to the housing arrangements for Ranney School's star basketball players, Scottie Lewis and Bryan Antoine. The players were living in homes owned by Brian Klatsky, a team parent and founder of Team Rio National, or his parents, which led to concerns about extra benefits and amateurism rules.

== Notable alumni ==
- Bryan Antoine (born 2000, class of 2019), professional basketball player for the Den Helder Suns of the BNXT League
- Preet Bharara (born 1968), federal prosecutor who served as United States Attorney for the Southern District of New York from 2009 to 2017
- Abby Boyan (born 1999, class of 2018), professional soccer player for the Utah Royals of the National Women's Soccer League
- Catherine Ashmore Bradley (born 2007, class of 2026), actress
- Kirsten Dunst (born 1982), actress (attended through the 5th grade)
- Vin Gopal (born 1985, class of 2003), politician who has represented the 11th Legislative District in the New Jersey Senate since 2018, serving as majority whip
- AJ Gracia (born 2004), Virginia Cavaliers baseball player and top prospect for the 2026 Major League Baseball draft
- Walter David Greason (class of 1991), historian whose research addresses suburbanization, racial segregation and economic history
- Jacquie Lee (born 1997), a singer who finished in second place on The Voice season 5
- Scottie Lewis (born 2000, class of 2019), professional basketball player for the Niagara River Lions of the Canadian Elite Basketball League
- Marc Lore (born 1971), entrepreneur, investor and co-owner of the Minnesota Timberwolves
- Jessica Springsteen (born 1991), an international equestrian who is the daughter of Bruce Springsteen
- Phillip Wheeler (born 2002), professional basketball player who played in the NBA for the Philadelphia 76ers
