= 2024–25 Villanova Wildcats men's basketball team =

American college basketball season

2024–25 Villanova Wildcats men's basketball

College Basketball Crown, Semifinals
- Conference: Big East Conference
- Record: 21–15 (11–9 Big East)
- Head coach: Kyle Neptune (fired), Mike Nardi (interim)
- Assistant coaches: Mike Nardi (until March 15); Dwayne Anderson; Ashley Howard; Jamie Young
- Home arena: Finneran Pavilion; Wells Fargo Center

2024–25 Big East men's basketball standings
	Conf.				Overall
Team	W		L	PCT	W		L	PCT
No. 11 St. John's †	18	–	2	.900	31	–	5	.861
Creighton	15	–	5	.750	25	–	11	.694
UConn	14	–	6	.700	24	–	11	.686
Xavier	13	–	7	.650	22	–	12	.647
Marquette	13	–	7	.650	23	–	11	.676
Villanova	11	–	9	.550	21	–	15	.583
Georgetown	8	–	12	.400	18	–	16	.529
Providence	6	–	14	.300	12	–	20	.375
Butler	6	–	14	.300	15	–	20	.429
DePaul	4	–	16	.200	14	–	20	.412
Seton Hall	2	–	18	.100	7	–	25	.219
† 2025 Big East tournament winner Rankings from AP Poll

The 2024–25 Villanova Wildcats men's basketball team represented Villanova University in the 2024–25 NCAA Division I men's basketball season. Led by coach Kyle Neptune in his third season as a head coach, the Wildcats played their home games at the Finneran Pavilion on the school's campus in the Philadelphia suburb of Villanova, Pennsylvania and Wells Fargo Center as members of the Big East Conference. They finished the season 19–14, 11–9 in Big East play to finish in sixth place. They defeated Seton Hall in the first round of the Big East tournament before losing to UConn in the quarterfinals. They accepted a bid to the inaugural College Basketball Crown tournament.

On March 15, 2025, the school fired head coach Kyle Neptune. Assistant coach Mike Nardi was named interim coach for the postseason tournament. On March 30, the school named Maryland head coach Kevin Willard the team's new head coach.

== Previous season ==
The Wildcats finished the 2023–24 season 18–16, 10–10 in Big East play, to tie for sixth place. They defeated DePaul in the opening round of the 2024 Big East tournament before losing to Marquette in the quarterfinals. The Wildcats received an at-large bid to the NIT, losing in the first round to VCU.

== Offseason ==
=== Departures ===
Name	Number	Pos.	Height	Weight	Year	Hometown	Reason for departure
TJ Bamba	0	G	6'5"	215	Senior	Bronx, NY	Graduate transferred to Oregon
Brendan Hausen	1	G	6'5"	205	Sophomore	Amarillo, TX	Transferred to Kansas State
Mark Armstrong	2	G	6'2"	180	Sophomore	South Orange, NJ	Declare for 2024 NBA draft; went undrafted/signed with the Brooklyn Nets
Trey Patterson	3	F	6'9"	225	(redshirt) Junior	Somerset, NJ	Transferred to Rice
Chris Arcidiacono	4	G	6'5"	205	GS senior	Langhorne, PA	Graduated
Justin Moore	5	G	6'4"	210	GS senior	Fort Washington, MD	Graduated
Hakim Hart	13	G	6'8"	205	GS senior	Philadelphia, PA	Graduated
Lance Ware	14	F	6'9"	235	Senior	Camden, NJ	Graduate transferred to UT Arlington
Tyler Burton	23	F	6'7"	215	GS senior	Uxbridge, MA	Graduated

=== Incoming transfers ===
Name	Num	Pos.	Height	Weight	Year	Hometown	Previous school
Kris Parker	1	G	6'9"	195	(redshirt) Freshman	Tallahassee, FL	Alabama
Jhamir Brickus	2	G	5'11"	205	GS senior	Coatesville, PA	La Salle
Tyler Perkins	4	G	6'4"	205	Sophomore	Lorton, VA	Penn
Wooga Poplar	5	G	6'2"	192	Senior	Philadelphia, PA	Miami (FL)
Enoch Boakye	13	C	6'10"	250	Senior	Brampton, ON	Fresno State

=== 2024 recruiting class ===
College recruiting
Name	Hometown	School	Height	Weight	Commit date
Josiah Moseley #7 SF	Round Rock, TX	Stony Point High School	6 ft 8 in (2.03 m)	205 lb (93 kg)	Oct 9, 2023
Josiah Moseley #7 SF	Recruit ratings: Rivals: 247Sports: ESPN: (85)				
Matt Hodge #26 PF	Belmar, NJ	St. Rose High School	6 ft 8 in (2.03 m)	220 lb (100 kg)	Nov 10, 2023
Matt Hodge #26 PF	Recruit ratings: Rivals: 247Sports: ESPN: (82)				
Malcolm Thomas #58 PF	Hyattsville, MD	DeMatha Catholic High School	6 ft 7 in (2.01 m)	200 lb (91 kg)	Oct 5, 2023
Malcolm Thomas #58 PF	Recruit ratings: Rivals: 247Sports: ESPN: (78)				
Aleksandar Gavalyugov; PG	Bulgaria	N/A	6 ft 2 in (1.88 m)	165 lb (75 kg)	Jun 13, 2024
Aleksandar Gavalyugov; PG	Recruit ratings: Rivals: 247Sports: ESPN: (NR)				
Overall recruit ranking:
Note: In many cases, Scout, Rivals, 247Sports, On3, and ESPN may conflict in their listings of height and weight.; In these cases, the average was taken. ESPN grades are on a 100-point scale.; Sources: "2024 Villanova Commits". Rivals.; "2024 Team Ranking". Rivals.

== Roster ==
2024–25 Villanova Wildcats men's basketball team
Players
Coaches

Pos.	#	Name	Height	Weight	Year	Previous school	Hometown
F	0	Josiah Moseley	6 ft 6 in (1.98 m)	185 lb (84 kg)	Fr	Stony Point HS	Round Rock, TX
G	1	Kris Parker	6 ft 9 in (2.06 m)	195 lb (88 kg)	RS Fr	Alabama	Tallahassee, FL
G	2	Jhamir Brickus	5 ft 11 in (1.8 m)	205 lb (93 kg)	GS	La Salle	Coatesville, PA
G	4	Tyler Perkins	6 ft 4 in (1.93 m)	205 lb (93 kg)	So	Penn	Lorton, VA
G	5	Wooga Poplar	6 ft 5 in (1.96 m)	197 lb (89 kg)	Sr	Miami (FL)	Philadelphia, PA
G	7	Aleksandar Gavalyugov	6 ft 2 in (1.88 m)	195 lb (88 kg)	Fr	NBA Global Academy	Sofia, Bulgaria
F	10	Jordann Dumont	6 ft 8 in (2.03 m)	200 lb (91 kg)	RS Fr	Hamilton Heights Christian (TN)	Montreal, QC
G	12	Collin O'Toole (W)	6 ft 1 in (1.85 m)	180 lb (82 kg)	Sr	St. Thomas More	Rye, NY
C	13	Enoch Boakye	6 ft 11 in (2.11 m)	250 lb (113 kg)	Sr	Fresno State	Brampton, ON
G	14	Wade Chiddick (W)	6 ft 4 in (1.93 m)	200 lb (91 kg)	Jr	Westtown School	King of Prussia, PA
G	15	Jordan Longino	6 ft 5 in (1.96 m)	215 lb (98 kg)	Sr	Germantown Academy	Doylestown, PA
F	20	Malcolm Thomas	6 ft 8 in (2.03 m)	195 lb (88 kg)	Fr	DeMatha Catholic HS	Mitchellville, MD
F	21	Nnanna Njoku	6 ft 9 in (2.06 m)	260 lb (118 kg)	RS Jr	Sanford School	Newark, DE
F	33	Matt Hodge (I)	6 ft 8 in (2.03 m)	200 lb (91 kg)	Fr	St. Rose HS	Belmar, NJ
F	43	Eric Dixon	6 ft 8 in (2.03 m)	255 lb (116 kg)	GS	Abington HS	Willow Grove, PA

Head coach

- Kyle Neptune (Lehigh)

Assistant coach(es)

- Mike Nardi (Villanova)
- Dwayne Anderson (Villanova)
- Ashley Howard (Drexel)
- Jamie Young (Blackburn)

Legend

- (C) Team captain
- (S) Suspended
- (I) Ineligible
- (W) Walk-on
- Injured
- Current redshirt

Roster

== Schedule and results ==
Date time, TV	Rank^{#}	Opponent^{#}	Result	Record	High points	High rebounds	High assists	Site (attendance) city, state
Exhibition
October 27, 2024*; 12:00 p.m.		Robert Morris	W 87–73	–	28 – Dixon	10 – Boakye	10 – Brickus	Finneran Pavilion (2,125); Villanova, PA
Non-conference regular season
November 4, 2024*; 8:00 p.m., FS1/Fox Sports App		Lafayette	W 75–63	1–0	20 – Poplar	11 – Boakye	5 – Longino	Finneran Pavilion (6,501); Villanova, PA
November 6, 2024*; 7:00 p.m., CBSSN		Columbia	L 80–90	1–1	33 – Dixon	7 – Poplar	8 – Brickus	Finneran Pavilion (6,501); Villanova, PA
November 8, 2024*; 8:30 p.m., FS2		NJIT	W 91–54	2–1	22 – Dixon	10 – Dixon	4 – Poplar	Finneran Pavilion (6,501); Villanova, PA
November 12, 2024*; 5:00 p.m., CBSSN		at Saint Joseph's; Big 5 Classic Pod 2/Holy War	L 76–83	2–2	24 – Dixon	9 – Dixon	3 – Tied	Hagan Arena (3,326); Philadelphia, PA
November 15, 2024*; 5:00 p.m., TNT		vs. Virginia; Hall of Fame Series Baltimore	L 60–70	2–3	20 – Dixon	8 – Tied	3 – Brickus	CFG Bank Arena (4,868); Baltimore, MD
November 19, 2024*; 7:00 p.m., Peacock		Penn; Big 5 Classic Pod 2	W 93–49	3–3	23 – Dixon	9 – Perkins	8 – Brickus	Finneran Pavilion (6,501); Villanova, PA
November 24, 2024*; 1:00 p.m., ESPN		vs. Maryland; Empire Classic	L 75–76	3–4	38 – Dixon	6 – Tied	4 – Brickus	Prudential Center (7,117); Newark, NJ
November 27, 2024*; 7:00 p.m., FS2		Rider; Empire Classic campus site game	W 72–48	4–4	16 – Dixon	5 – Poplar	5 – Dixon	Finneran Pavilion (6,501); Villanova, PA
December 3, 2024*; 6:30 p.m., FS1		No. 14 Cincinnati; Big East–Big 12 Battle	W 68–60	5–4	31 – Dixon	10 – Poplar	9 – Brickus	Finneran Pavilion (6,501); Villanova, PA
December 7, 2024*; 4:30 p.m., NBCSP+		vs. Temple; Big 5 Classic 3rd place game	W 94–65	6–4	24 – Dixon	7 – Tied	7 – Brickus	Wells Fargo Center; Philadelphia, PA
December 11, 2024*; 7:00 p.m., FS1		Fairleigh Dickinson	W 86–72	7–4	27 – Dixon	10 – Boakye	10 – Brickus	Finneran Pavilion (6,501); Villanova, PA
Big East regular season
December 17, 2024; 7:30 p.m., Peacock		Seton Hall	W 79–67	8–4 (1–0)	25 – Dixon	7 – Poplar	7 – Brickus	Finneran Pavilion (6,501); Villanova, PA
December 21, 2024; 4:00 p.m., FS1		at Creighton	L 79–86	8–5 (1–1)	27 – Dixon	10 – Poplar	4 – Brickus	CHI Health Center Omaha (17,125); Omaha, NE
January 1, 2025; 6:30 p.m., FS1		at Butler	W 73–65	9–5 (2–1)	28 – Dixon	15 – Poplar	4 – Tied	Hinkle Fieldhouse (8,284); Indianapolis, IN
January 4, 2025; 12:00 p.m., FS1		DePaul	W 100–56	10–5 (3–1)	25 – Dixon	14 – Boekye	11 – Brickus	Finneran Pavilion (6,501); Villanova, PA
January 8, 2025; 6:30 p.m., FS1		No. 9 UConn	W 68–66	11–5 (4–1)	23 – Dixon	5 – Moseley	5 – Brickus	Finneran Pavilion (6,501); Villanova, PA
January 11, 2025; 7:00 p.m., CBSSN		at St. John's	L 68–80	11–6 (4–2)	22 – Poplar	6 – Brickus	3 – Tied	Madison Square Garden (18,178); New York, NY
January 14, 2025; 6:30 p.m., FS1		at Xavier	L 63–69	11–7 (4–3)	18 – Tied	9 – Boakye	5 – Brickus	Cintas Center (10,077); Cincinnati, OH
January 17, 2025; 7:00 p.m., FS1		Providence	W 75–73	12–7 (5–3)	23 – Dixon	13 – Poplar	4 – Brickus	Wells Fargo Center (10,253); Philadelphia, PA
January 20, 2025; 6:00 p.m., FS1		Georgetown	L 63–64	12–8 (5–4)	29 – Dixon	12 – Boakye	7 – Brickus	Finneran Pavilion (6,501); Villanova, PA
January 24, 2025; 7:00 p.m., FS1		at No. 10 Marquette	L 74–87	12–9 (5–5)	27 – Longino	9 – Dixon	7 – Longino	Fiserv Forum (17,542); Milwaukee, WI
February 1, 2025; 1:00 p.m., FOX		Creighton	L 60–62	12–10 (5–6)	24 – Poplar	5 – Tied	4 – Brickus	Wells Fargo Center (13,124); Philadelphia, PA
February 5, 2025; 9:00 p.m., CBSSN		at DePaul	W 59–49	13–10 (6–6)	17 – Longino	10 – Boakye	3 – Brickus	Wintrust Arena (3,789); Chicago, IL
February 9, 2025; 12:00 p.m., FS1		Xavier	W 80–68	14–10 (7–6)	24 – Dixon	8 – Poplar	7 – Brickus	Wells Fargo Center (8,462); Philadelphia, PA
February 12, 2025; 6:00 p.m., FS1		No. 9 St. John's	W 73–71	15–10 (8–6)	22 – Poplar	7 – Boakye	5 – Brickus	Finneran Pavilion (6,501); Villanova, PA
February 15, 2025; 6:00 p.m., CBSSN		at Providence	L 62–75	15–11 (8–7)	18 – Tied	9 – Tied	3 – Longino	Amica Mutual Pavilion (12,444); Providence, RI
February 18, 2025; 6:30 p.m., FS1		at UConn	L 59–66	15–12 (8–8)	19 – Poplar	7 – Perkins	3 – Tied	XL Center (15,684); Hartford, CT
February 21, 2025; 7:00 p.m., FS1		No. 16 Marquette	W 81–66	16–12 (9–8)	23 – Dixon	9 – Poplar	5 – Poplar	Wells Fargo Center (10,862); Philadelphia, PA
February 26, 2025; 8:30 p.m., FS1		at Seton Hall	W 59–54	17–12 (10–8)	32 – Dixon	12 – Poplar	3 – Brickus	Prudential Center (8,697); Newark, NJ
March 1, 202; 12:00 p.m., FOX		Butler	W 80–70	18–12 (11–8)	34 – Dixon	9 – Poplar	4 – Poplar	Finneran Pavilion (6,501); Villanova, PA
March 4, 2025; 8:00 p.m., Peacock		at Georgetown	L 73–75	18–13 (11–9)	24 – Dixon	11 – Boakye	7 – Brickus	Capital One Arena (5,144); Washington, D.C.
Big East tournament
March 12, 2025; 9:00 p.m., Peacock	(6)	vs. (11) Seton Hall; First Round	W 67–55	19–13	19 – Dixon	10 – Poplar	3 – Tied	Madison Square Garden (19,812); New York, NY
March 13, 2025; 10:18 p.m., FS1	(6)	vs. (3) UConn; Quarterfinal	L 56–73	19–14	25 – Poplar	6 – Perkins	2 – Brickus	Madison Square Garden (19,812); New York, NY
College Basketball Crown
April 1, 2025*; 8:30 p.m., FS1		vs. Colorado; First round	W 85–64	20–14	24 – Poplar	9 – Boakye	4 – Longino	MGM Grand Garden Arena (2,407); Paradise, NV
April 3, 2025*; 9:30 p.m., FS1		vs. USC; Quarterfinals	W 60–59	21–14	28 – Dixon	8 – Tied	4 – Longino	MGM Grand Garden Arena (2,279); Paradise, NV
April 5, 2025*; 4:00 p.m., FOX		vs. UCF; Semifinals	L 98–104 ^{OT}	21–15	32 – Poplar	11 – Tied	3 – Tied	T-Mobile Arena (2,972); Paradise, NV
*Non-conference game. ^{#}Rankings from AP poll. (#) Tournament seedings in parentheses. All times are in Eastern Time.
