= 2018–19 Villanova Wildcats men's basketball team =

American college basketball season

2018–19 Villanova Wildcats men's basketball

Big East regular season and tournament champions AdvoCare Invitational champions

NCAA tournament, Second Round
- Conference: Big East Conference

Ranking
- Coaches: No. 20
- AP: No. 23
- Record: 26–10 (13–5 Big East)
- Head coach: Jay Wright (18th season)
- Assistant coaches: Kyle Neptune; George Halcovage; Mike Nardi
- Home arena: Finneran Pavilion; Wells Fargo Center

2018–19 Big East men's basketball standings
	Conf.				Overall
Team	W		L	PCT	W		L	PCT
No. 23 Villanova †	13	–	5	.722	26	–	10	.722
Marquette	12	–	6	.667	24	–	10	.706
Seton Hall	9	–	9	.500	20	–	14	.588
Xavier	9	–	9	.500	19	–	16	.543
Creighton	9	–	9	.500	20	–	15	.571
Georgetown	9	–	9	.500	19	–	14	.576
St. John's	8	–	10	.444	21	–	13	.618
Providence	7	–	11	.389	18	–	16	.529
Butler	7	–	11	.389	16	–	17	.485
DePaul	7	–	11	.389	19	–	17	.528
† 2019 Big East tournament winner Rankings from AP Poll

The 2018–19 Villanova Wildcats men's basketball team represented Villanova University in the 2018–19 NCAA Division I men's basketball season. Led by head coach Jay Wright in his 18th year, the Wildcats played their home games at the Finneran Pavilion on the school's campus in the Philadelphia suburb of Villanova, Pennsylvania and Wells Fargo Center as members of the Big East Conference. They finished the season 26–10, 13–5 in Big East play to finish in first place. They defeated Providence, Xavier, and Seton Hall to win the Big East tournament. As a result, the Wildcats received the conference's automatic bid to the NCAA tournament as the No. 6 seed in the South region. There they defeated Saint Mary's before being defeated by Purdue in the Second Round.

== Previous season ==
The Wildcats finished the 2017–18 season 36–4, 14–4 in Big East play to finish in second place. They defeated Marquette, Butler, and Providence to win the Big East tournament championship. As a result, they received the conference's automatic bid to the NCAA tournament as the No. 1 seed in the East region, their third No. 1 seed in four years. They defeated Radford, Alabama, West Virginia, and Texas Tech to advance to the Final Four for the second time in three years. In the National Semifinal, they defeated Kansas before defeating Michigan in the National Championship game to win their second national championship in three years. They won every game of the tournament by a double-digit margin and the team's tournament run has been called among the most dominant ever.

== Offseason ==
=== Coaching changes ===
Following the season, longtime assistant coach Ashley Howard left the Wildcats to become the head coach at La Salle.

=== Departures ===
Name	Number	Pos.	Height	Weight	Year	Hometown	Notes
Jalen Brunson	1	G	6'3"	190	JR	Lincolnshire, IL	NBA draft
Donte DiVincenzo	10	G	6'5"	205	RS SO	Wilmington, DE	NBA draft
Omari Spellman	14	F	6´9¨	245	RS FR	North Royalton, OH	NBA draft
Tom Leibig	24	F	6´5¨	200	SR	Havertown, PA	Graduated
Mikal Bridges	25	F	6'7"	210	RS JR	Malvern, PA	NBA draft
Matt Kennedy	35	G	5´11¨	175	SR	Fairfax, VA	Graduated
Denny Grace	40	G	5'11"	175	RS SR	Catonsville, MD	Graduated

=== Incoming transfers ===
Name	Number	Pos.	Height	Weight	Year	Hometown	Previous School
Joe Cremo	24	G	6'4"	185	Graduate Student	Scotia, NY	Albany

=== 2018 recruiting class ===
College recruiting information
Name	Hometown	School	Height	Weight	Commit date
Brandon Slater; SF	Centerville, VA	Paul VI Catholic High School	6 ft 6 in (1.98 m)	180 lb (82 kg)	May 24, 2017
Brandon Slater; SF	Recruit ratings: Scout: Rivals: 247Sports: ESPN:				
Cole Swider; SF	Portsmouth, RI	St. Andrew's School	6 ft 7 in (2.01 m)	210 lb (95 kg)	May 24, 2017
Cole Swider; SF	Recruit ratings: Scout: Rivals: 247Sports: ESPN:				
Jahvon Quinerly; PG	Hackensack, NJ	Hudson Catholic High School	6 ft 0 in (1.83 m)	170 lb (77 kg)	Feb 14, 2018
Jahvon Quinerly; PG	Recruit ratings: Scout: Rivals: 247Sports: ESPN:				
Saddiq Bey; SF	Largo, MD	Sidwell Friends School	6 ft 7 in (2.01 m)	195 lb (88 kg)	Jun 15, 2018
Saddiq Bey; SF	Recruit ratings: Scout: Rivals: 247Sports: ESPN:				
Overall recruit ranking:
Note: In many cases, Scout, Rivals, 247Sports, On3, and ESPN may conflict in their listings of height and weight.; In these cases, the average was taken. ESPN grades are on a 100-point scale.; Sources: "2018 Villanova Commits". Rivals.; "2018 Team Ranking". Rivals.

=== 2019 Recruiting class ===
College recruiting information (2019)
Name	Hometown	School	Height	Weight	Commit date
Justin Moore #9 SG	Accokeek, MD	DeMatha Catholic High School	6 ft 4 in (1.93 m)	200 lb (91 kg)	May 2, 2018
Justin Moore #9 SG	Recruit ratings: Scout: Rivals: 247Sports: ESPN:				
Eric Dixon #18 PF	William Grove, PA	Abington High School	6 ft 7 in (2.01 m)	275 lb (125 kg)	Apr 17, 2018
Eric Dixon #18 PF	Recruit ratings: Scout: Rivals: 247Sports: ESPN:				
Bryan Antoine #12 SG	Tinton Falls, NJ	Ranney School	6 ft 5 in (1.96 m)	170 lb (77 kg)	Sep 4, 2018
Bryan Antoine #12 SG	Recruit ratings: Scout: Rivals: 247Sports: ESPN:				
Jeremiah Robinson-Earl; PF	Shawnee Mission, KS	IMG Academy (FL)	6 ft 9 in (2.06 m)	235 lb (107 kg)	Oct 30, 2018
Jeremiah Robinson-Earl; PF	Recruit ratings: Scout: Rivals: 247Sports: ESPN:				
Overall recruit ranking:
Note: In many cases, Scout, Rivals, 247Sports, On3, and ESPN may conflict in their listings of height and weight.; In these cases, the average was taken. ESPN grades are on a 100-point scale.; Sources: "2019 Villanova Commits". Rivals.; "2019 Team Ranking". Rivals.

== Roster ==
2018–19 Villanova Wildcats men's basketball team
Players
Coaches

Pos.	#	Name	Height	Weight	Year	Previous school	Hometown
G	1	Jahvon Quinerly	6 ft 1 in (1.85 m)	175 lb (79 kg)	Fr	Hudson Catholic	Hackensack, NJ
G	2	Collin Gillespie	6 ft 3 in (1.91 m)	183 lb (83 kg)	So	Archbishop Wood	Warminster, PA
F	3	Brandon Slater	6 ft 7 in (2.01 m)	205 lb (93 kg)	Fr	Paul VI	Fairfax, VA
F	4	Eric Paschall	6 ft 8 in (2.03 m)	255 lb (116 kg)	RS Sr	Fordham	Dobbs Ferry, NY
G	5	Phil Booth	6 ft 3 in (1.91 m)	194 lb (88 kg)	RS Sr	Mount Saint Joseph	Baltimore, MD
F	10	Cole Swider	6 ft 9 in (2.06 m)	210 lb (95 kg)	Fr	St. Andrews	Providence, RI
G	12	Tim Saunders (W)	6 ft 4 in (1.93 m)	200 lb (91 kg)	Sr	Torrey Pines	Del Mar, CA
F	15	Saddiq Bey	6 ft 8 in (2.03 m)	220 lb (100 kg)	Fr	Sidwell Friends	Washington, D.C.
F	21	Dhamir Cosby-Roundtree	6 ft 9 in (2.06 m)	226 lb (103 kg)	So	Neumann–Goretti	Philadelphia, PA
G	22	Peyton Heck (W)	5 ft 11 in (1.8 m)	175 lb (79 kg)	Sr	Archmere Academy	Wilmington, DE
F	23	Jermaine Samuels	6 ft 7 in (2.01 m)	220 lb (100 kg)	So	The Rivers School	Franklin, MA
G	24	Joe Cremo	6 ft 4 in (1.93 m)	191 lb (87 kg)	GS	Albany	Scotia, NY
F	34	Tim Delaney	6 ft 8 in (2.03 m)	224 lb (102 kg)	RS Jr	Blair Academy	Mullica Hill, NJ
F	42	Dylan Painter	6 ft 11 in (2.11 m)	224 lb (102 kg)	RS So	Hershey High School	Hershey, PA

Head coach

- Jay Wright (Bucknell)

Assistant coach(es)

- Kyle Neptune (Lehigh)
- George Halcovage (Babson)
- Mike Nardi (Villanova)

Legend

- (C) Team captain
- (S) Suspended
- (I) Ineligible
- (W) Walk-on
- Injured
- Current redshirt

Roster

== Schedule and results ==
Date time, TV	Rank^{#}	Opponent^{#}	Result	Record	High points	High rebounds	High assists	Site (attendance) city, state
Non-conference regular season
November 6, 2018*; 7:00 pm, FS1	No. 9	Morgan State	W 100–77	1–0	26 – Paschall	7 – 2 Tied	6 – Gillespie	Finneran Pavilion (6,501); Villanova, PA
November 10, 2018*; 8:00 pm, FS2	No. 9	Quinnipiac	W 86–53	2–0	23 – Booth	8 – Paschall	5 – Booth	Wells Fargo Center (10,216); Philadelphia, PA
November 14, 2018*; 6:30 pm, FS1	No. 8	No. 18 Michigan; Gavitt Tipoff Games	L 46–73	2–1	10 – Paschall	6 – Paschall	3 – Gillespie	Finneran Pavilion (6,501); Villanova, PA
November 17, 2018*; 5:00 pm, FS2	No. 8	Furman; AdvoCare Invitational campus site game	L 68–76 ^{OT}	2–2	20 – Booth	11 – Cosby-Roundtree	5 – Paschall	Finneran Pavilion (6,501); Villanova, PA
November 22, 2018*; 1:30 pm, ESPN2		vs. Canisius; AdvoCare Invitational Quarterfinals	W 83–56	3–2	15 – Tied	13 – Cosby-Roundtree	2 – 4 Tied	HP Field House; Lake Buena Vista, FL
November 23, 2018*; 11:30 am, ESPN		vs. Oklahoma State; Advocare Invitational	W 77–58	4–2	22 – Paschall	13 – Cosby-Roundtree	5 – Tied	HP Field House; Lake Buena Vista, FL
November 25, 2018*; 12:00 pm, ESPN		vs. No. 14 Florida State; Advocare Invitational final	W 66–60	5–2	17 – Gillespie	8 – Cosby-Roundtree	2 – 2 Tied	HP Field House (3,127); Lake Buena Vista, FL
December 1, 2018*; 3:00 pm, ESPN2	No. 23	vs. La Salle; Philadelphia Big 5	W 85–78	6–2	27 – Paschall	5 – Cosby-Roundtree	5 – Gillespie	The Palestra (6,522); Philadelphia, PA
December 5, 2018*; 8:30 pm, FS1	No. 21	Temple; Philadelphia Big 5	W 69–59	7–2	15 – Samuels	7 – 4 Tied	4 – Gillespie	Finneran Pavilion (6,501); Villanova, PA
December 8, 2018*; 2:00 pm, FS1	No. 21	Saint Joseph's; Philadelphia Big 5/Holy War	W 70–58	8–2	14 – Paschall	9 – Paschall	6 – Booth	Finneran Pavilion (6,501); Villanova, PA
December 11, 2018*; 7:00 pm, ESPN2	No. 17	at Penn; Philadelphia Big 5	L 75–78	8–3	21 – Gillespie	5 – Paschall	2 – Booth	The Palestra (8,033); Philadelphia, PA
December 15, 2018*; 12:00 pm, ESPN	No. 17	at No. 1 Kansas	L 71–74	8–4	29 – Booth	11 – Cosby-Roundtree	3 – Gillespie	Allen Fieldhouse (16,300); Lawrence, KS
December 22, 2018*; 12:30 pm, CBS		vs. UConn; New York Showcase	W 81–58	9–4	21 – Paschall	7 – Booth	7 – Booth	Madison Square Garden (16,027); New York, NY
Big East regular season
January 2, 2019; 8:30 pm, FS1		DePaul	W 73–68	10–4 (1–0)	24 – Paschall	6 – Paschall	6 – Booth	Finneran Pavilion (6,501); Villanova, PA
January 5, 2019; 2:00 pm, FOX		at Providence	W 65–59	11–4 (2–0)	23 – Booth	14 – Paschall	4 – Booth	Dunkin' Donuts Center (12,410); Providence, RI
January 8, 2019; 7:00 pm, FS1		No. 24 St. John's	W 76–71	12–4 (3–0)	25 – Paschall	8 – Tied	6 – Gillespie	Finneran Pavilion (6,501); Villanova, PA
January 13, 2019; 12:00 pm, FOX		at Creighton	W 90–78	13–4 (4–0)	28 – Booth	7 – Paschall	7 – Booth	CHI Health Center Omaha (17,379); Omaha, NE
January 18, 2019; 8:30 pm, FS1	No. 22	Xavier	W 85–75	14–4 (5–0)	22 – Booth	8 – Paschall	5 – Booth	Wells Fargo Center (12,103); Philadelphia, PA
January 22, 2019; 7:00 pm, FS1	No. 18	at Butler	W 80–72	15–4 (6–0)	23 – Paschall	8 – Cosby-Roundtree	5 – Booth	Hinkle Fieldhouse (8,962); Indianapolis, IN
January 27, 2019; 2:30 pm, FOX	No. 18	Seton Hall	W 80–52	16–4 (7–0)	25 – Booth	8 – Tied	5 – Booth	Wells Fargo Center (16,444); Philadelphia, PA
January 30, 2019; 8:00 pm, CBSSN	No. 14	at DePaul	W 86–74	17–4 (8–0)	20 – Paschall	11 – Bey	8 – Booth	Wintrust Arena (5,002); Chicago, IL
February 3, 2019; 12:00 pm, FS1	No. 14	Georgetown	W 77–65	18–4 (9–0)	30 – Gillespie	16 – Samuels	4 – Gillespie	Wells Fargo Center (14,506); Philadelphia, PA
February 6, 2019; 8:00 pm, CBSSN	No. 14	Creighton	W 66–59 ^{OT}	19–4 (10–0)	17 – Bey	8 – Booth	6 – Gillespie	Finneran Pavilion (6,501); Villanova, PA
February 9, 2019; 2:30 pm, FOX	No. 14	at No. 10 Marquette	L 65–66	19–5 (10–1)	19 – Booth	6 – Tied	3 – Tied	Fiserv Forum (17,856); Milwaukee, WI
February 13, 2019; 6:30 pm, FS1	No. 13	Providence	W 85–67	20–5 (11–1)	25 – Paschall	7 – Cosby-Roundtree	8 – Gillespie	Finneran Pavilion (6,501); Villanova, PA
February 17, 2019; 5:00 pm, FS1	No. 13	at St. John's	L 65–71	20–6 (11–2)	14 – Cremo	14 – Paschall	4 – Paschall	Madison Square Garden (19,812); New York, NY
February 20, 2019; 6:30 pm, FS1	No. 17	at Georgetown	L 73–85	20–7 (11–3)	26 – Booth	10 – Bey	5 – Bey	Capital One Arena (11,624); Washington, D.C.
February 24, 2019; 1:30 pm, CBS	No. 17	at Xavier	L 54–66	20–8 (11–4)	17 – Paschall	8 – Bey	4 – Booth	Cintas Center (10,444); Cincinnati, OH
February 27, 2019; 9:00 pm, FS1		No. 10 Marquette	W 67–61	21–8 (12–4)	29 – Samuels	9 – Samuels	7 – Booth	Finneran Pavilion (6,501); Villanova, PA
March 2, 2019; 2:00 pm, FOX		Butler	W 75–54	22–8 (13–4)	28 – Booth	10 – Samuels	5 – Paschall	Wells Fargo Center (17,515); Philadelphia, PA
March 9, 2019; 12:00 pm, FOX	No. 23	at Seton Hall	L 75–79	22–9 (13–5)	22 – Gillespie	8 – Tied	5 – Paschall	Prudential Center (16,114); Newark, NJ
Big East tournament
March 14, 2019; 12:00 pm, FS1	(1) No. 25	vs. (8) Providence; Quarterfinals	W 73–62	23–9	20 – Paschall	10 – Tie	6 – Gillespie	Madison Square Garden (19,534); New York, NY
March 15, 2019; 6:30 pm, FS1	(1) No. 25	vs. (4) Xavier; Semifinals	W 71–67 ^{OT}	24–9	28 – Booth	9 – Samuels	5 – Booth	Madison Square Garden (19,812); New York, NY
March 16, 2019; 6:35 pm, FOX	(1) No. 25	vs. (3) Seton Hall; Championship	W 74–72	25–9	17 – Paschall	10 – Bey	3 – 4 tied	Madison Square Garden (19,812); New York, NY
NCAA tournament
March 21, 2019*; 7:20 pm, TBS	(6 S) No. 23	vs. (11 S) Saint Mary's; First Round	W 61–57	26–9	21 – Booth	7 – Samuels	6 – Booth	XL Center (14,695); Hartford, CT
March 23, 2019*; 8:40 pm, TNT	(6 S) No. 23	vs. (3 S) No. 13 Purdue; Second Round	L 61–87	26–10	19 – Paschall	4 – Tied	2 – Tied	XL Center (15,031); Hartford, CT
*Non-conference game. ^{#}Rankings from AP Poll. (#) Tournament seedings in parentheses. S=South. All times are in Eastern Time.

== Rankings ==
Ranking movements Legend: ██ Increase in ranking ██ Decrease in ranking RV = Received votes ( ) = First-place votes
	Week																				
Poll	Pre	1	2	3	4	5	6	7	8	9	10	11	12	13	14	15	16	17	18	19	Final
AP	9 (1)	8	RV	23	21	17	RV	RV	RV	RV	22	18	14	14	13	17	RV	23	25	23	Not released
Coaches	8	8^	RV	23	21	16	RV	RV	RV	RV	21	18	14	13	13	16	RV	23	25	22	20

*AP does not release post-NCAA Tournament rankings
^Coaches did not release a Week 1 poll.
