= 2023–24 Villanova Wildcats men's basketball team =

American college basketball season

2023–24 Villanova Wildcats men's basketball

Battle 4 Atlantis champions

NIT, First Round
- Conference: Big East Conference
- Record: 18–16 (10–10 Big East)
- Head coach: Kyle Neptune (2nd season)
- Assistant coaches: Mike Nardi; Dwayne Anderson; Ashley Howard
- Home arena: Finneran Pavilion (Capacity: 6,501); Wells Fargo Center (Capacity: 20,478)

2023–24 Big East men's basketball standings
	Conf.				Overall
Team	W		L	PCT	W		L	PCT
No. 1 UConn †	18	–	2	.900	37	–	3	.925
No. 13 Creighton	14	–	6	.700	25	–	10	.714
No. 12 Marquette	14	–	6	.700	27	–	10	.730
Seton Hall	13	–	7	.650	25	–	12	.676
St. John's	11	–	9	.550	20	–	13	.606
Villanova	10	–	10	.500	18	–	16	.529
Providence	10	–	10	.500	21	–	14	.600
Butler	9	–	11	.450	18	–	15	.545
Xavier	9	–	11	.450	16	–	18	.471
Georgetown	2	–	18	.100	9	–	23	.281
DePaul	0	–	20	.000	3	–	29	.094
† 2024 Big East tournament winner Rankings from AP Poll

The 2023–24 Villanova Wildcats men's basketball team represented Villanova University in the 2023–24 NCAA Division I men's basketball season. Led by coach Kyle Neptune in his second season as a head coach, the Wildcats played their home games at the Finneran Pavilion on the school's campus in the Philadelphia suburb of Villanova, Pennsylvania and Wells Fargo Center as members of the Big East Conference.

== Previous season ==
The Wildcats finished the 2022–23 season 17–17, 10–10 in Big East play, to tie for sixth place. They defeated Georgetown in the opening round of the 2023 Big East tournament before losing to Creighton in the quarterfinals. The Wildcats received an at-large bid to the NIT, losing in the first round to Liberty. This season was the first time they missed the NCAA tournament since 2011–12, and first time since joining the Big East Conference.

== Offseason ==
=== Departures ===
Name	Number	Pos.	Height	Weight	Year	Hometown	Reason for departure
Angelo Brizzi	10	G	6'3"	190	RS freshman	Warrenton, VA	Transferred to Davidson
Caleb Daniels	14	G	6'4"	210	GS senior	New Orleans, LA	Graduated/undrafted in 2023 NBA draft; signed with the Miami Heat
Cam Whitmore	22	F	6'7"	232	Freshman	Odenton, MD	Declared for 2023 NBA draft; selected 20th overall by Houston Rockets
Brandon Slater	34	F	6'8"	220	GS senior	Centerville, VA	Graduated

=== Incoming transfers ===
Name	Num	Pos.	Height	Weight	Year	Hometown	Previous school
TJ Bamba	0	G	6'5"	215	Senior	The Bronx, NY	Washington State
Hakim Hart	13	G	6'8"	205	GS senior	Philadelphia, PA	Maryland
Lance Ware	14	F	6'9"	235	Senior	Camden, NJ	Kentucky
Tyler Burton	23	F	6'7"	215	GS senior	Uxbridge, MA	Richmond

=== 2023 recruiting class ===
College recruiting
Name	Hometown	School	Height	Weight	Commit date
Jordann Dumont #83 SF	Chattanooga, TN	Hamilton Heights Christian Academy	6 ft 8 in (2.03 m)	190 lb (86 kg)	Nov 15, 2022
Jordann Dumont #83 SF	Recruit ratings: Rivals: 247Sports: ESPN: (77)				
Overall recruit ranking:
Note: In many cases, Scout, Rivals, 247Sports, On3, and ESPN may conflict in their listings of height and weight.; In these cases, the average was taken. ESPN grades are on a 100-point scale.; Sources: "2023 Villanova Commits". Rivals.; "2023 Team Ranking". Rivals.

== Roster ==
2023–24 Villanova Wildcats men's basketball team
Players
Coaches

Pos.	#	Name	Height	Weight	Year	Previous school	Hometown
G	0	TJ Bamba	6 ft 5 in (1.96 m)	215 lb (98 kg)	Sr	Washington State	The Bronx, NY
G	1	Brendan Hausen	6 ft 5 in (1.96 m)	205 lb (93 kg)	So	Amarillo HS	Amarillo, TX
G	2	Mark Armstrong	6 ft 2 in (1.88 m)	180 lb (82 kg)	So	Saint Peter's Prep	South Orange, NJ
F	3	Trey Patterson	6 ft 9 in (2.06 m)	225 lb (102 kg)	RS Jr	Rutgers Prep	Somerset, NJ
G	4	Chris Arcidiacono	6 ft 5 in (1.96 m)	205 lb (93 kg)	GS	Perkiomen School	Langhorne, PA
G	5	Justin Moore	6 ft 4 in (1.93 m)	210 lb (95 kg)	GS	DeMatha Catholic HS	Fort Washington, MD
F	10	Jordann Dumont	6 ft 8 in (2.03 m)	200 lb (91 kg)	Fr	Hamilton Heights Christian (TN)	Montreal, QC
G	12	Collin O'Toole (W)	6 ft 1 in (1.85 m)	180 lb (82 kg)	Jr	St. Thomas More	Rye, NY
G	13	Hakim Hart	6 ft 8 in (2.03 m)	205 lb (93 kg)	GS	Maryland	Philadelphia, PA
F	14	Lance Ware	6 ft 9 in (2.06 m)	235 lb (107 kg)	Sr	Kentucky	Camden, NJ
G	15	Jordan Longino	6 ft 5 in (1.96 m)	215 lb (98 kg)	Jr	Germantown Academy	Doylestown, PA
F	21	Nnanna Njoku	6 ft 9 in (2.06 m)	260 lb (118 kg)	Jr	Sanford School	Newark, DE
F	23	Tyler Burton	6 ft 7 in (2.01 m)	215 lb (98 kg)	GS	Richmond	Uxbridge, MA
F	43	Eric Dixon	6 ft 8 in (2.03 m)	255 lb (116 kg)	RS Sr	Abington HS	Willow Grove, PA

Head coach

- Kyle Neptune (Lehigh)

Assistant coach(es)

- Mike Nardi (Villanova)
- Dwayne Anderson (Villanova)
- Ashley Howard (Drexel)

Legend

- (C) Team captain
- (S) Suspended
- (I) Ineligible
- (W) Walk-on
- Injured
- Current redshirt

Roster
Last update: 2024-04-01

== Schedule and results ==
Date time, TV	Rank^{#}	Opponent^{#}	Result	Record	High points	High rebounds	High assists	Site (attendance) city, state
Non-conference regular season
November 6, 2023*; 7:30 p.m., FS1	No. 22	American	W 90–63	1–0	15 – tied	7 – Burton	4 – tied	Finneran Pavilion (6,501); Villanova, PA
November 10, 2023*; 6:30 p.m., FS1	No. 22	Le Moyne	W 83–57	2–0	21 – Moore	13 – Burton	4 – tied	Finneran Pavilion (6,501); Villanova, PA
November 13, 2023*; 7:00 p.m., ESPN+/NBCSPHI	No. 21	at Penn; Big 5 Classic Pod 2	L 72–76	2–1	25 – Moore	9 – Dixon	3 – Moore	Palestra (6,723); Philadelphia, PA
November 17, 2023*; 8:30 p.m., FS1	No. 21	Maryland; Gavitt Tipoff Games	W 57–40	3–1	15 – Burton	8 – Dixon	2 – tied	Finneran Pavilion (6,501); Villanova, PA
November 22, 2023*; 2:30 p.m., ESPN		vs. Texas Tech; Battle 4 Atlantis quarterfinals	W 85–69	4–1	19 – Dixon	6 – tied	5 – Moore	Imperial Arena (612); Nassau, Bahamas
November 23, 2023*; 2:30 p.m., ESPN		vs. No. 14 North Carolina; Battle 4 Atlantis semifinals	W 83–81 ^{OT}	5–1	34 – Dixon	10 – Dixon	2 – tied	Imperial Arena (1,500); Nassau, Bahamas
November 24, 2023*; 3:30 p.m., ESPN		vs. Memphis; Battle 4 Atlantis championship	W 79–63	6–1	13 – Bamba	9 – Burton	5 – Longino	Imperial Arena (1,201); Nassau, Bahamas
November 29, 2023*; 6:30 p.m., FS1	No. 18	Saint Joseph's; Big 5 Classic Pod 2/Holy War	L 65–78	6–2	17 – Moore	7 – Longino	3 – tied	Finneran Pavilion (6,501); Villanova, PA
December 2, 2023*; 2:00 p.m., NBCSPHI+/Peacock	No. 18	vs. Drexel; Big 5 Classic fifth-place game	L 55–57	6–3	21 – Dixon	8 – Hart	3 – tied	Wells Fargo Center (–); Philadelphia, PA
December 5, 2023*; 7:00 p.m., ESPN2		at Kansas State; Big East-Big 12 Battle	L 71–72 ^{OT}	6–4	16 – Longino	11 – Burton	4 – Bamba	Bramlage Coliseum (10,140); Manhattan, KS
December 9, 2023*; 7:00 p.m., FOX		UCLA	W 65–56	7–4	18 – Burton	10 – tied	3 – Armstrong	Wells Fargo Center (16,823); Philadelphia, PA
Big East regular season
December 20, 2023; 9:00 p.m., FS1		at No. 12 Creighton	W 68–66 ^{OT}	8–4 (1–0)	32 – Dixon	12 – Burton	4 – Longino	CHI Health Center Omaha (17,333); Omaha, NE
December 23, 2023; 4:00 p.m., FS1		at DePaul	W 84–48	9–4 (2–0)	20 – Hart	9 – Burton	4 – Bamba	Wintrust Arena (4,523); Chicago, IL
January 3, 2024; 8:30 p.m., FS1		Xavier	W 66–65	10–4 (3–0)	14 – Hart	9 – Dixon	3 – tied	Finneran Pavilion (6,501); Villanova, PA
January 6, 2024; 1:00 p.m., FOX		St. John's	L 71–81	10–5 (3–1)	23 – Bamba	7 – Bamba	4 – Armstrong	Finneran Pavilion (6,501); Villanova, PA
January 12, 2024; 8:30 p.m., FS1		DePaul	W 94–69	11–5 (4–1)	24 – Dixon	10 – Burton	4 – Burton	Finneran Pavilion (6,501); Villanova, PA
January 15, 2024; 2:30 p.m., FOX		at No. 17 Marquette	L 74–87	11–6 (4–2)	24 – Armstrong	10 – Burton	3 – tied	Fiserv Forum (17,018); Milwaukee, WI
January 20, 2024; 8:00 p.m., FS1		No. 1 UConn	L 65–66	11–7 (4–3)	15 – tied	7 – Dixon	4 – Dixon	Wells Fargo Center (18,966); Philadelphia, PA
January 24, 2024; 8:30 p.m., FS1		at St. John's	L 50–70	11–8 (4–4)	16 – Dixon	8 – Dixon	5 – Armstrong	Madison Square Garden (12,859); New York, NY
January 27, 2024; 3:00 p.m., FS1		at Butler	L 81–88 ^{2OT}	11–9 (4–5)	28 – Dixon	10 – Burton	5 – Dixon	Hinkle Fieldhouse (9,237); Indianapolis, IN
January 30, 2024; 7:00 p.m., FS1		No. 9 Marquette	L 80–85	11–10 (4–6)	24 – tied	8 – Armstrong	6 – Moore	Finneran Pavilion (6,501); Villanova, PA
February 4, 2024; 6:00 p.m., FS1		Providence	W 68–50	12–10 (5–6)	12 – Dixon	6 – tied	5 – Hart	Wells Fargo Center (13,168); Philadelphia, PA
February 7, 2024; 7:00 p.m., FS1		at Xavier	L 53–56	12–11 (5–7)	15 – Hausen	8 – Bamba	5 – Armstrong	Cintas Center (10,285); Cincinnati, OH
February 11, 2024; 12:00 p.m., CBSSN		Seton Hall	W 80–54	13–11 (6–7)	18 – Dixon	6 – Burton	5 – Armstrong	Wells Fargo Center (13,754); Philadelphia, PA
February 16, 2024; 7:05 p.m., CBSSN		at Georgetown	W 70–54	14–11 (7–7)	14 – Bamba	7 – Dixon	8 – Dixon	Capital One Arena (9,406); Washington, D.C.
February 20, 2024; 6:30 p.m., FS1		Butler	W 72–62	15–11 (8–7)	22 – Dixon	6 – tied	3 – tied	Finneran Pavilion (6,501); Villanova, PA
February 24, 2024; 8:00 p.m., FOX		at No. 1 UConn; College GameDay	L 54–78	15–12 (8–8)	20 – Dixon	8 – Dixon	2 – Hart	Gampel Pavilion (10,299); Storrs, CT
February 27, 2024; 6:30 p.m., FS1		Georgetown	W 75–47	16–12 (9–8)	22 – Dixon	8 – Burton	6 – Armstrong	Finneran Pavilion (6,501); Villanova, PA
March 2, 2024; 12:00 p.m., FOX		at Providence	W 71–60	17–12 (10–8)	15 – Moore	5 – Burton	5 – Armstrong	Amica Mutual Pavilion (12,525); Providence, RI
March 6, 2024; 6:30 p.m., FS1		at Seton Hall	L 56–66	17–13 (10–9)	14 – Dixon	6 – Dixon	2 – tied	Prudential Center (10,481); Newark, NJ
March 9, 2024; 2:30 p.m., FOX		No. 10 Creighton	L 67–69	17–14 (10–10)	25 – Dixon	5 – tied	4 – Hart	Wells Fargo Center (13,422); Philadelphia, PA
Big East tournament
March 13, 2024; 9:00 p.m., FS1	(6)	vs. (11) DePaul; First Round	W 58–57	18–14	21 – Dixon	9 – Dixon	4 – tied	Madison Square Garden (19,812); New York, NY
March 14, 2024; 9:30 p.m., FS1	(6)	vs. (3) No. 10 Marquette; Quarterfinal	L 65–71 ^{OT}	18–15	19 – Dixon	11 – tied	6 – Moore	Madison Square Garden (19,812); New York, NY
National Invitation Tournament
March 20, 2024; 9:00 p.m., ESPN2	(1)	VCU; First Round - Villanova Bracket	L 61–70	18–16	21 – Dixon	13 – Dixon	5 – Armstrong	Finneran Pavilion (1,763); Villanova, PA
*Non-conference game. ^{#}Rankings from AP poll. (#) Tournament seedings in parentheses. All times are in Eastern Time.

== Rankings ==
Ranking movements Legend: ██ Increase in ranking ██ Decrease in ranking — = Not ranked RV = Received votes
	Week																				
Poll	Pre	1	2	3	4	5	6	7	8	9	10	11	12	13	14	15	16	17	18	19	Final
AP	22	21	RV	18	RV	—	—	RV	RV	—	RV	—	—	—	—	—	—	RV	—	—	
Coaches	20	21	RV	15	RV	—	—	RV	RV	RV	RV	—	—	—	—	—	—	RV	—	—	

*AP does not release post-NCAA tournament rankings.
