= 2022–23 Villanova Wildcats men's basketball team =

American college basketball season

2022–23 Villanova Wildcats men's basketball

Philadelphia Big 5 co-champions

NIT, First Round
- Conference: Big East Conference
- Record: 17–17 (10–10 Big East)
- Head coach: Kyle Neptune (1st season)
- Assistant coaches: George Halcovage; Mike Nardi; Dwayne Anderson
- Home arena: Finneran Pavilion (Capacity: 6,501); Wells Fargo Center (Capacity: 20,478)

2022–23 Big East men's basketball standings
	Conf.				Overall
Team	W		L	PCT	W		L	PCT
No. 6 Marquette †	17	–	3	.850	29	–	7	.806
No. 13 Xavier	15	–	5	.750	27	–	10	.730
Creighton	14	–	6	.700	24	–	13	.649
No. 10 UConn	13	–	7	.650	31	–	8	.795
Providence	13	–	7	.650	21	–	12	.636
Villanova	10	–	10	.500	17	–	17	.500
Seton Hall	10	–	10	.500	17	–	16	.515
St. John's	7	–	13	.350	18	–	15	.545
Butler	6	–	14	.300	14	–	18	.438
DePaul	3	–	17	.150	10	–	23	.303
Georgetown	2	–	18	.100	7	–	25	.219
† 2023 Big East tournament winner Rankings from AP poll

The 2022–23 Villanova Wildcats men's basketball team represented Villanova University in the 2022–23 NCAA Division I men's basketball season. Led by head coach Kyle Neptune in his first year as a head coach, the Wildcats played their home games at the Finneran Pavilion on the school's campus in the Philadelphia suburb of Villanova, Pennsylvania and Wells Fargo Center as members of the Big East Conference. They finished with a record of 16–15, 10–10 to tie for sixth place in regular conference play. In the 2023 Big East Tournament, they defeated Georgetown in the opening round before losing to Creighton in the quarterfinals. The Wildcats received an at-large bid to the NIT, losing in the first round to Liberty.

== Previous season ==
The Wildcats finished the 2021–22 season 30–8, 16–4 in Big East play to finish in second place. They defeated St. John's, UConn, and Creighton to win the Big East tournament championship. As a result, they received the conference's automatic bid to the NCAA tournament as the No. 2 seed in the South region. They defeated Delaware, Ohio State, Michigan, and Houston to advance to the Final Four. There they lost to eventual national champion Kansas.

On April 20, 2022, head coach Jay Wright announced he was retiring effective immediately. Former Wright assistant and Fordham head coach Kyle Neptune was named the team's new head coach.

== Offseason ==
=== Departures ===
Name	Number	Pos.	Height	Weight	Year	Hometown	Reason for departure
Bryan Antoine	1	G	6'5"	180	Junior	Tinton Falls, NJ	Transferred to Radford
Collin Gillespie	2	G	6'3"	195	GS senior	Huntingdon Valley, PA	Graduated/undrafted in 2022 NBA draft
Kevin Voigt	12	G	6'5"	210	Senior	Massapequa, NY	Walk-on; graduated
Dhamir Cosby-Roundtree	21	F	6'9"	250	GS senior	Philadelphia, PA	Graduated
Jermaine Samuels	23	F	6'7"	230	GS senior	Franklin, MA	Graduated

=== 2022 recruiting class ===
College recruiting
Name	Hometown	School	Height	Weight	Commit date
Cam Whitmore #5 PF	Severn, MD	Archbishop Spalding High School	6 ft 7 in (2.01 m)	220 lb (100 kg)	Oct 7, 2021
Cam Whitmore #5 PF	Recruit ratings: Scout: Rivals: 247Sports: ESPN: (90)				
Mark Armstrong #12 PG	Jersey City, NJ	Saint Peter's Prep	6 ft 2 in (1.88 m)	185 lb (84 kg)	Apr 8, 2021
Mark Armstrong #12 PG	Recruit ratings: Scout: Rivals: 247Sports: ESPN: (84)				
Brendan Hausen #29 SG	Amarillo, TX	Amarillo High School	6 ft 4 in (1.93 m)	180 lb (82 kg)	Sep 27, 2021
Brendan Hausen #29 SG	Recruit ratings: Scout: Rivals: 247Sports: ESPN: (81)				
Overall recruit ranking:
Note: In many cases, Scout, Rivals, 247Sports, On3, and ESPN may conflict in their listings of height and weight.; In these cases, the average was taken. ESPN grades are on a 100-point scale.; Sources: "2022 Villanova Commits". Rivals.; "2022 Team Ranking". Rivals.

== Roster ==
2022–23 Villanova Wildcats men's basketball team
Players
Coaches

Pos.	#	Name	Height	Weight	Year	Previous school	Hometown
G	1	Brendan Hausen	6 ft 5 in (1.96 m)	205 lb (93 kg)	Fr	Amarillo HS	Amarillo, TX
G	2	Mark Armstrong	6 ft 2 in (1.88 m)	180 lb (82 kg)	Fr	Saint Peter's Prep	South Orange, NJ
F	3	Trey Patterson	6 ft 9 in (2.06 m)	225 lb (102 kg)	RS So	Rutgers Prep	Somerset, NJ
G	4	Chris Arcidiacono	6 ft 5 in (1.96 m)	205 lb (93 kg)	Sr	Perkiomen School	Langhorne, PA
G	5	Justin Moore	6 ft 4 in (1.93 m)	215 lb (98 kg)	Sr	DeMatha Catholic HS	Fort Washington, MD
G	10	Angelo Brizzi	6 ft 3 in (1.91 m)	190 lb (86 kg)	RS Fr	Highland School	Warrenton, VA
G	12	Collin O'Toole (W)	6 ft 1 in (1.85 m)	180 lb (82 kg)	So	St. Thomas More	Rye, NY
G	14	Caleb Daniels	6 ft 4 in (1.93 m)	210 lb (95 kg)	GS	Tulane	New Orleans, LA
G	15	Jordan Longino	6 ft 5 in (1.96 m)	215 lb (98 kg)	So	Germantown Academy	Doylestown, PA
F	21	Nnanna Njoku	6 ft 9 in (2.06 m)	260 lb (118 kg)	So	Sanford School	Newark, DE
F	22	Cam Whitmore	6 ft 7 in (2.01 m)	232 lb (105 kg)	Fr	Archbishop Spalding HS	Odenton, MD
F	34	Brandon Slater	6 ft 8 in (2.03 m)	220 lb (100 kg)	GS	Paul VI Catholic HS	Centerville, VA
F	43	Eric Dixon	6 ft 8 in (2.03 m)	255 lb (116 kg)	RS Jr	Abington HS	Willow Grove, PA

Head coach

- Kyle Neptune (Lehigh)

Assistant coach(es)

- George Halcovage (Babson)
- Mike Nardi (Villanova)
- Dwayne Anderson (Villanova)

Legend

- (C) Team captain
- (S) Suspended
- (I) Ineligible
- (W) Walk-on
- Injured
- Current redshirt

Roster

== Schedule and results ==
Date time, TV	Rank^{#}	Opponent^{#}	Result	Record	High points	High rebounds	High assists	Site (attendance) city, state
Non-conference regular season
November 7, 2022*; 6:30 p.m., FS1	No. 16	La Salle; Philadelphia Big 5	W 81–68	1–0	24 – Daniels	10 – Daniels	4 – Tied	Finneran Pavilion (6,501); Villanova, PA
November 11, 2022*; 7:00 p.m., ESPNU	No. 16	at Temple; Philadelphia Big 5	L 64–68	1–1	19 – Daniels	10 – Arcidiacono	3 – Longino	Liacouras Center (8,646); Philadelphia, PA
November 14, 2022*; 6:30 p.m., FS2		Delaware State	W 60–50	2–1	17 – Dixon	7 – Dixon	3 – Slater	Finneran Pavilion (6,501); Villanova, PA
November 18, 2022*; 8:00 p.m., FS1		at Michigan State; Gavitt Tipoff Games	L 71–73	2–2	24 – Dixon	9 – Dixon	4 – Arcidiacano	Breslin Center (14,797); East Lansing, MI
November 24, 2022*; 3:30 p.m., ESPN2		vs. Iowa State; Phil Knight Invitational quarterfinals	L 79–81 ^{OT}	2–3	25 – Daniels	10 – Dixon	7 – Daniels	Moda Center (6,229); Portland, OR
November 25, 2022*; 3:00 p.m., ESPN2		vs. Portland; Phil Knight Invitational consolation round	L 71–83	2–4	18 – Daniels	7 – Tied	2 – 3 Tied	Veterans Memorial Coliseum; Portland, OR
November 27, 2022*; 3:00 p.m., ESPN2		vs. Oregon; Phil Knight Invitational 7th place game	L 67–74	2–5	16 – Daniels	9 – Slater	6 – Arcidiacono	Chiles Center; Portland, OR
December 3, 2022*; 12:30 p.m., CBS		Oklahoma; Big East–Big 12 Battle	W 70–66	3–5	22 – Daniels	5 – Slater	3 – Daniels	Wells Fargo Center (17,079); Philadelphia, PA
December 7, 2022*; 7:00 p.m., CBSSN		Penn; Philadelphia Big 5	W 70–59	4–5	21 – Whitmore	6 – Whitmore	5 – Daniels	Finneran Pavilion (6,501); Villanova, PA
December 10, 2022*; 5:00 p.m., FOX		vs. Boston College; Never Forget Tribute Classic	W 77–56	5–5	19 – Whitmore	7 – Tied	4 – Daniels	Prudential Center (9,437); Newark, NJ
December 17, 2022*; 4:00 p.m., CBSSN		at Saint Joseph's; Holy War/Philadelphia Big 5	W 71–64	6–5	19 – Slater	12 – Dixon	5 – Daniels	Hagan Arena (3,924); Philadelphia, PA
Big East regular season
December 21, 2022; 6:30 p.m., FS1		St. John's	W 78–63	7–5 (1–0)	18 – Dixon	10 – Whitmore	5 – Arcidiacono	Finneran Pavilion (6,501); Villanova, PA
December 28, 2022; 6:30 p.m., FS1		at No. 2 UConn	L 66–74	7–6 (1–1)	23 – Daniels	8 – Dixon	3 – Slater	XL Center (15,564); Hartford, CT
December 31, 2022; 2:00 p.m., FS1		Marquette	L 66–68	7–7 (1–2)	14 – Whitmore	8 – Whitmore	4 – Daniels	Finneran Pavilion (6,501); Villanova, PA
January 4, 2023; 6:30 p.m., FS1		at Georgetown	W 73–57	8–7 (2–2)	20 – Daniels	8 – Dixon	2 – Tied	Capital One Arena (7,203); Washington, D.C.
January 7, 2023; 4:30 p.m., FS1		No. 18 Xavier	L 80–88	8–8 (2–3)	26 – Whitmore	7 – Slater	4 – Daniels	Finneran Pavilion (6,501); Villanova, PA
January 10, 2023; 9:00 p.m., CBSSN		at DePaul	L 65–75	8–9 (2–4)	22 – Dixon	10 – Dixon	6 – Daniels	Wintrust Arena (4,273); Chicago, IL
January 13, 2023; 7:00 p.m., FS1		at Butler	L 71–79	8–10 (2–5)	22 – Dixon	8 – Whitmore	5 – Arcidiacono	Hinkle Fieldhouse (8,688); Indianapolis, IN
January 16, 2023; 12:08 p.m., FOX		Georgetown	W 77–73	9–10 (3–5)	15 – Slater	4 – Tied	2 – Tied	Finneran Pavilion (6,501); Villanova, PA
January 20, 2023; 7:00 p.m., FS1		at St. John's	W 57–49	10–10 (4–5)	16 – Daniels	11 – Dixon	3 – Armstrong	Madison Square Garden (13,504); New York, NY
January 29, 2023; 12:00 p.m., FS1		No. 23 Providence	L 65–70	10–11 (4–6)	21 – Whitmore	9 – Whitmore	4 – Moore	Wells Fargo Center (15,053); Philadelphia, PA
February 1, 2023; 8:30 p.m., FS1		at No. 14 Marquette	L 64–73	10–12 (4–7)	14 – Tied	8 – Slater	4 – Moore	Fiserv Forum (13,344); Milwaukee, WI
February 4, 2023; 7:30 p.m., FOX		at Creighton	L 61–66	10–13 (4–8)	20 – Dixon	9 – Dixon	2 – Tied	CHI Health Center Omaha (18,509); Omaha, NE
February 8, 2023; 8:30 p.m., FS1		DePaul	W 81–65	11–13 (5–8)	18 – Daniels	8 – Dixon	5 – Dixon	Finneran Pavilion (6,501); Villanova, PA
February 11, 2023; 8:00 p.m., FS1		Seton Hall	W 58–54	12–13 (6–8)	19 – Dixon	7 – Moore	2 – Tied	Wells Fargo Center (15,015); Philadelphia, PA
February 14, 2023; 8:00 p.m., CBSSN		Butler	W 62–50	13–13 (7–8)	15 – Moore	7 – Tied	3 – Dixon	Finneran Pavilion (6,501); Villanova, PA
February 18, 2023; 4:30 p.m., FOX		at No. 24 Providence	L 72–85	13–14 (7–9)	18 – Dixon	8 – Dixon	4 – Moore	Amica Mutual Pavilion (12,659); Providence, RI
February 21, 2023; 6:30 p.m., FS1		at No. 16 Xavier	W 64–63	14–14 (8–9)	25 – Moore	5 – Dixon	4 – Dixon	Cintas Center (10,349); Cincinnati, OH
February 25, 2023; 12:00 p.m., FOX		No. 19 Creighton	W 79–67	15–14 (9–9)	31 – Dixon	7 – Daniels	8 – Moore	Wells Fargo Center (17,114); Philadelphia, PA
February 28, 2023; 8:30 p.m., FS1		at Seton Hall	W 76–72	16–14 (10–9)	23 – Moore	8 – Dixon	3 – Dixon	Prudential Center (11,071); Newark, NJ
March 4, 2023; 7:30 p.m., FOX		No. 14 UConn	L 59–71	16–15 (10–10)	17 – Moore	7 – Daniels	3 – Daniels	Wells Fargo Center (16,264); Philadelphia, PA
Big East tournament
March 8, 2023; 8:15 p.m., FS1	(6)	vs. (11) Georgetown; First round	W 80–48	17–15	19 – Whitmore	10 – Whitmore	5 – Daniels	Madison Square Garden; New York, NY
March 9, 2023; 9:30 p.m., FS1	(6)	vs. (3) No. 24 Creighton; Quarterfinal	L 74–87	17–16	20 – Dixon	7 – Dixon	7 – Moore	Madison Square Garden (19,812); New York, NY
NIT tournament
March 14, 2023; 9:00 p.m., ESPN2		at (3) Liberty; First round – Oregon bracket	L 57–62	17–17	18 – Slater	13 – Dixon	3 – Armstrong	Liberty Arena (3,252); Lynchburg, VA
*Non-conference game. ^{#}Rankings from AP Poll. (#) Tournament seedings in parentheses. All times are in Eastern Time.

== Rankings ==
Ranking movements Legend: ██ Increase in ranking ██ Decrease in ranking RV = Received votes
	Week																			
Poll	Pre	1	2	3	4	5	6	7	8	9	10	11	12	13	14	15	16	17	18	Final
AP	16	RV																		Not released
Coaches	17	RV																		

*AP does not release post-NCAA Tournament rankings
