= Ashley Howard =

Ashley Howard may refer to:

- Ashley Howard (curler), Canadian curler
- Ashley Howard (basketball), American basketball player and coach
