= Big 5 Classic =

American college basketball tournament and showcase

- Sport: College basketball
- Founded: 2023 (men); 2024 (women)
- No. of teams: 6
- Country: United States
- Headquarters: Philadelphia, Pennsylvania, U.S.
- Venues: Xfinity Mobile Arena (men); Finneran Pavilion (women)
- Most recent champions: Villanova (men); Villanova (women)
- Broadcasters: NBC Sports Philadelphia Plus, Peacock
- Sponsors: MHS Lift (2023); Toyota (2024–present)
- Website: big5classic.com

The Big 5 Classic, officially known as the Toyota Big 5 Classic for sponsorship reasons, is an annual early-season college basketball tournament and showcase featuring the six member schools of the Philadelphia Big 5—Drexel, La Salle, Penn, Saint Joseph's, Temple, and Villanova. The tournament begins in November with pod play and concludes on the first weekend in December with triple-headers for the men's and women's competitions.

== History ==
Before 2023, the Big 5 members played each other once annually (Note: For teams that played each other twice due to being in the same conference, the second matchup between the schools was counted for Big 5 competition.) in a round-robin format, determining the champion as the school(s) with the best record in Big 5 play. In January 2023, administrators from the five member schools agreed on a new format for the men's Big 5 play. This included the creation of the concluding triple-header, the Big 5 Classic, and the addition of Drexel University to the series. The motivation behind this change was to "resuscitate" the Big 5, as the series had experienced declining attendance figures in the preceding years.

In the new format, the six schools are divided into two pods of three teams each. Throughout November, round-robin play occurs within each pod, with each team playing the other two teams in their pod in campus-site games. After pod play, the series moves to Xfinity Mobile Arena for the Big 5 Classic, a single-day, triple-header event with three games, held on the first Saturday in December. The first game is the 5th place game, featuring the two teams that finished third in each pod; the second game is the 3rd place game, featuring the two teams that finished second in each pod, and the final game is the championship game, featuring the two teams that finished first in each pod. The winner of the championship game is the champion of the Big 5 for that season. If all three teams in a pod finished tied at 1–1, the tiebreaker is the first NET ranking of the season, which is typically released five days before the championship tripleheader.

In June 2024, the athletic directors of the Big 5 member schools introduced the women's edition of the Big 5 Classic. The women's showcase follows the same pod and scheduling structure as the men's, however, the women's Big 5 Classic is held on the day before, the first Friday in December, and takes place at the Finneran Pavilion in Villanova, Pennsylvania. In 2025, the women's Big 5 Classic was moved to the first Sunday in December, one day after the men's edition.

== Brackets ==
=== Men ===
==== 2023 ====
===== Campus-site games =====
Campus-site games were hosted by the team listed second below.

Pod 1

November 7 ESPN+
Drexel	61
La Salle	67

November 14; NBCSP, FloHoops
Temple	66
Drexel	64

November 29; ESPN+
La Salle	99
Temple	106***

* – Denotes overtime period

Pod 2

November 10; NBCSP, ESPN+
Penn	61
Saint Joseph's	69

November 13; NBCSP, ESPN+
No. 21 Villanova	72
Penn	76

November 29; FS1
Saint Joseph's	78
No. 18 Villanova	65

===== Standings =====
Pod 1
Pos	Team	W	L
1	Temple	2	0
2	La Salle	1	1
3	Drexel	0	2

Advanced to the Big 5 Classic Championship

Pod 2
Pos	Team	W	L
1	Saint Joseph's	2	0
2	Penn	1	1
3	Villanova	0	2

===== Big 5 Classic =====
All games were played at the Wells Fargo Center on December 2.

5th place game 2:00 PM EST; NBCSP+, Peacock
Drexel	57
No. 18 Villanova	55

3rd place game 4:45 PM EST; NBCSP+, Peacock
La Salle	93*
Penn	92

Championship; 7:30 PM EST; NBCSP+, Peacock
Temple	65
Saint Joseph’s	74

* – Denotes overtime period

==== 2024 ====
===== Campus-site games =====
Campus-site games were hosted by the team listed second below.

Pod 1

November 12; ESPN+
Drexel	61
Temple	69

November 16; FloHoops
La Salle	71
Drexel	68

November 30; ESPN+
Temple	75
La Salle	83

Pod 2

November 12; CBSSN
Villanova	76
Saint Joseph's	83

November 15; ESPN+
Saint Joseph's	86
Penn	69

November 19; Peacock
Penn	49
Villanova	93

===== Standings =====
Pod 1
Pos	Team	W	L
1	La Salle	2	0
2	Temple	1	1
3	Drexel	0	2

Advanced to the Big 5 Classic Championship

Pod 2
Pos	Team	W	L
1	Saint Joseph's	2	0
2	Villanova	1	1
3	Penn	0	2

===== Big 5 Classic =====
All games were played at the Wells Fargo Center on December 7.

5th place game 2:00 PM EST; NBCSP+, Peacock
Penn	47
Drexel	60

3rd place game 4:30 PM EST; NBCSP+, Peacock
Villanova	94
Temple	65

Championship; 7:00 PM EST; NBCSP+, Peacock
Saint Joseph’s	82
La Salle	68

==== 2025 ====
===== Campus-site games =====
Campus-site games were hosted by the team listed second below.

Pod 1

November 11; ESPN+
La Salle	63
Temple	90

November 19; CBSSN
Villanova	70
La Salle	55

December 1 FS1
Temple	56
Villanova	74

Pod 2

November 8 ESPN+
Drexel	65
Saint Joseph's	76

November 17; ESPN+
Saint Joseph's	74
Penn	83

November 21; FloCollege
Penn	84
Drexel	68

===== Standings =====
Pod 1
Pos	Team	W	L
1	Villanova	2	0
2	Temple	1	1
3	La Salle	0	2

Advanced to the Big 5 Classic Championship

Pod 2
Pos	Team	W	L
1	Penn	2	0
2	Saint Joseph's	1	1
3	Drexel	0	2

===== Big 5 Classic =====
All games were played at Xfinity Mobile Arena on December 6.

5th place game 2:00 PM EST; NBCSP+, Peacock
Drexel	64
La Salle	69

3rd place game 4:30 PM EST; NBCSP+, Peacock
Saint Joseph's	70
Temple	69

Championship; 7:00 PM EST; NBCSP+, Peacock
Penn	63
Villanova	90

==== 2026 ====
===== Campus-site games =====
Campus-site games will be hosted by the team listed second below.

Pod 1

November 10
La Salle	59
Villanova	80

November 15
Temple	84
La Salle	71

December 1
Villanova
Temple

Pod 2

November 14
Penn	77
Saint Joseph's	83

November 20
Saint Joseph's	64
Drexel	75

November 24
Drexel
Penn

===== Standings =====
Pod 1
Pos	Team	W	L
1	Temple	1	0
2	Villanova	1	0
3	La Salle	0	2

Advanced to the Big 5 Classic championship game

Pod 2
Pos	Team	W	L
1	Drexel	1	0
2	Saint Joseph's	1	1
3	Penn	0	1

===== Big 5 Classic =====
All games will be played at Xfinity Mobile Arena on December 5.

5th place game 2:00 PM EST; NBCSP+, Peacock
3rd place Pod 1
3rd place Pod 2

3rd place game 4:30 PM EST; NBCSP+, Peacock
2nd place Pod 1
2nd place Pod 2

Championship; 7:00 PM EST; NBCSP+, Peacock
1st place Pod 1
1st place Pod 2

=== Women ===
==== 2024 ====
===== Campus-site games =====
Campus-site games were hosted by the team listed second below.

Pod 1

November 13
La Salle	40
Drexel	73

November 23; ESPN+
Drexel	43
Temple	52

December 1 ESPN+
Temple	73
La Salle	68

Pod 2

November 15; ESPN+
Saint Joseph's	68
Penn	57

November 20
Penn	64
Villanova	80

December 1 ESPN+
Villanova	81
Saint Joseph's	65

===== Standings =====
Pod 1
Pos	Team	W	L
1	Temple	2	0
2	Drexel	1	1
3	La Salle	0	2

Advanced to the Big 5 Classic Championship

Pod 2
Pos	Team	W	L
1	Villanova	2	0
2	Saint Joseph's	1	1
3	Penn	0	2

===== Big 5 Classic =====
All games were played at the Finneran Pavilion on December 6.

5th place game 3:30 PM EST; NBCSP+, Peacock
La Salle	63
Penn	74

3rd place game 5:45 PM EST; NBCSP+, Peacock
Drexel	47
Saint Joseph's	69

Championship; 8:00 PM EST; NBCSP+, Peacock
Temple	76
Villanova	62

==== 2025 ====
===== Campus-site games =====
Campus-site games were hosted by the team listed second below.

Pod 1

November 12
Penn	55
Drexel	72

November 24; ESPN+
Saint Joseph's	74
Penn	53

November 29; ESPN+
Drexel	55
Saint Joseph's	57

Pod 2

November 14; ESPN+
La Salle	54
Temple	75

November 22; ESPN+
Temple	58
Villanova	88

November 25; ESPN+
Villanova	66
La Salle	54

===== Standings =====
Pod 1
Pos	Team	W	L
1	Saint Joseph's	2	0
2	Drexel	1	1
3	Penn	0	2

Advanced to the Big 5 Classic Championship

Pod 2
Pos	Team	W	L
1	Villanova	2	0
2	Temple	1	1
3	La Salle	0	2

===== Big 5 Classic =====
All games were played at the Finneran Pavilion on December 7.

5th place game 12:00 PM EST
Penn	65
La Salle	52

3rd place game 2:15 PM EST
Drexel	59
Temple	52

Championship; 4:30 PM EST
Saint Joseph's	70
Villanova	76

==== 2026 ====
===== Campus-site games =====
Campus-site games will be hosted by the team listed second below.

Pod 1

November 6
Drexel	70
Penn	71

November 15
Saint Joseph's	61
Drexel	56

November 18
Penn	65
Saint Joseph's	58

Pod 2

November 11
Temple	89
La Salle	67

November 24
La Salle
Villanova

December 1
Villanova
Temple

===== Standings =====
Pod 1
Pos	Team	W	L
1	Penn	2	0
2	Saint Joseph's	1	1
3	Drexel	0	2

Advanced to the Big 5 Classic championship game

Pod 2
Pos	Team	W	L
1	Temple	1	0
2	Villanova	0	0
3	La Salle	0	1

===== Big 5 Classic =====
All games will be played at the Palestra on December 6.

5th place game 12:00 PM EST
Drexel
3rd place Pod 2

3rd place game 2:15 PM EST
Saint Joseph's
2nd place Pod 2

Championship; 4:30 PM EST
Penn
1st place Pod 2
