= Aleksandar Gavalyugov =

Bulgarian basketball player (born 2006)

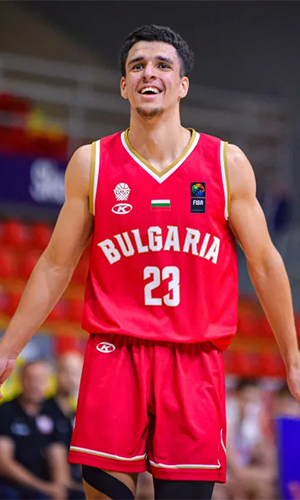

No. 2 – Santa Clara Broncos
- Position: Point guard / shooting guard
- League: West Coast Conference

Personal information
- Born: 22 January 2006 (age 20) Botevgrad, Bulgaria
- Listed height: 6 ft 3 in (1.91 m)
- Listed weight: 175 lb (79 kg)

Career information
- College: Villanova (2024–2025); Santa Clara (2025–present)
- Playing career: 2021–present

Career history
- 2021–2024: Balkan Botevgrad

Career highlights
- 2x NBL champion (2022, 2023)

Aleksandar Gavalyugov (Bulgarian: Александар Гавалюгов; born 22 January 2006), commonly knownas Sash Gavalyugov, is a Bulgarian college basketball player for the Santa Clara Broncos of the West Coast Conference. He plays as a point guard or a shooting guard.

== College career ==
On 13 June 2024, Gavalyugov committed to NCAA Division I squad Villanova for the 24–25 season. 247Sports give him 3 star rating. In his first season he played only 4 games. After the end of the season, Gavalyugov entered the NCAA transfer portal.

Gavalyugov ultimately transferred to Santa Clara. In his first season, his career point high was against Loyola 37. Two of his best performance were against Saint Mary's and Kentucky. The first was a WCC Tournament semifinal win, where he had 23 points and 5 assists. The other was NCAA tournament first round Overtime loss, where he had 16 Points, 6 Rebounds and 5 Assists.

== Professional career ==
Born in Botevgrad, he played in every formation of the local club Balkan Botevgrad. He made his professional debut on 8 October 21 against BC Yambol at the age of 15, and he scored his first points against BC Cherno More. He played а supporting role for the men's team, combining with matches for the youth formations and the B team. In this 3-year period his team won NBL two times. He also played in 2021–22 Balkan League and in the 2022–23 FIBA Europe Cup.

== Bulgarian national team ==
=== Junior national team ===
He played in three European Championship Division B Tournaments 2022 FIBA U16 European Championship Division B, 2023 FIBA U18 European Championship Division B and 2024 FIBA U18 EuroBasket Division B. In the last one, Bulgaria finished Third and he averaged 19.4 points, 6 Rebounds and 8.4 assist.

=== Senior national team ===
He made his debut in EuroBasket 2029 pre-qualifier – 1st round against Norway on 5th of July 2026

== Personal life ==
His father, Ivan Gavalyugov, was a basketball player and current Botevgrad mayor, while his mother is a basketball coach.
