= Tyler Burton =

American basketball player (born 2000)

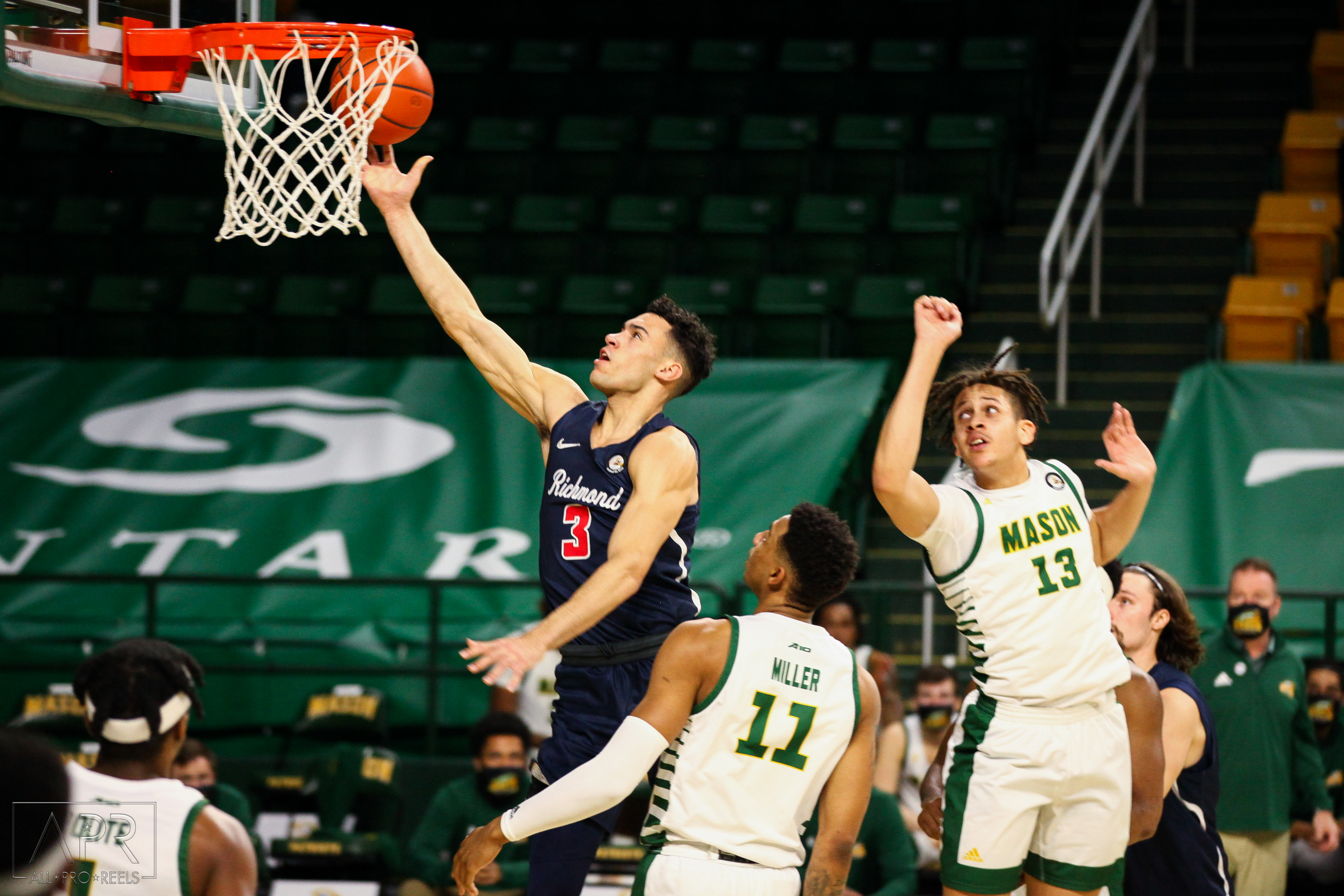

No. 27 – Santa Cruz Warriors
- Position: Small forward
- League: NBA G League

Personal information
- Born: February 11, 2000 (age 26) Uxbridge, Massachusetts, U.S.
- Listed height: 6 ft 7 in (2.01 m)
- Listed weight: 215 lb (98 kg)

Career information
- High school: Marianapolis Prep (Thompson, Connecticut)
- College: Richmond (2019–2023); Villanova (2023–2024)
- NBA draft: 2024: undrafted
- Playing career: 2024–present

Career history
- 2024–2026: Memphis Hustle
- 2026: Memphis Grizzlies
- 2026–present: Santa Cruz Warriors

Career highlights
- 2× Second-team All-Atlantic 10 (2022, 2023); Atlantic 10 Most Improved Player (2021)
- Stats at NBA.com
- Stats at Basketball Reference

Tyler Quinton Burton (born February 11, 2000) is an American professional basketball player for the Santa Cruz Warriors of the NBA G League. He played college basketball for the Richmond Spiders and the Villanova Wildcats.

== High school career ==
Burton played five years of varsity basketball for Marianapolis Preparatory School in Thompson, Connecticut, under head coach Andrew Vitale. He experienced a growth spurt as a sophomore and opted to reclassify, repeating his freshman year despite sufficient academic achievement. He was named New England Preparatory School Athletic Council Class B Player of the Year in his junior and senior seasons. Burton committed to playing college basketball for Richmond after developing a close connection with assistant coach Marcus Jenkins, choosing the Spiders over offers from St. Bonaventure, Rhode Island, and Siena.

== College career ==
As a freshman at Richmond, Burton averaged 4.6 points and 3.9 rebounds per game. He entered the starting lineup as a sophomore due to a season-ending injury to Nick Sherod prior to the season. Burton averaged 12 points and 7.6 rebounds per game, and was named Atlantic 10 Most Improved Player. He assumed an expanded role in his junior season with the departure of Blake Francis. On November 20, 2021, Burton recorded 30 points and nine rebounds in a 73–70 loss to Drake. On February 4, 2022, he scored a career-high 36 points in a 71–61 victory over St. Bonaventure. Burton was named to the Second Team All-Atlantic 10. As a junior, he averaged 16.1 points and 7.7 rebounds per game. On April 6, 2022, Burton declared for the 2022 NBA draft while maintaining his college eligibility, but later withdrew. On May 31, 2023, he removed his name from the 2023 NBA draft and transferred as a graduate to Villanova.

== Professional career ==
On March 12, 2026, Burton signed a 10-day contract with the Memphis Grizzlies. On March 20, Burton recorded a career-high 23 points and five rebounds in a 112–117 loss to the Boston Celtics. On March 23, he re-signed with the Grizzlies on a second 10-day contract.

== Career statistics ==
Legend
GP	Games played	GS	Games started	MPG	Minutes per game
FG%	Field goal percentage	3P%	3-point field goal percentage	FT%	Free throw percentage
RPG	Rebounds per game	APG	Assists per game	SPG	Steals per game
BPG	Blocks per game	PPG	Points per game	**Bold**	Career high

=== NBA ===
Year	Team	GP	GS	MPG	FG%	3P%	FT%	RPG	APG	SPG	BPG	PPG
2025–26	Memphis	12	0	25.6	.375	.333	.852	4.2	1.0	.9	.3	10.8
Career		12	0	25.6	.375	.333	.852	4.2	1.0	.9	.3	10.8

=== College ===
Year	Team	GP	GS	MPG	FG%	3P%	FT%	RPG	APG	SPG	BPG	PPG
2019–20	Richmond	30	1	14.1	.450	.263	.750	3.9	.3	.6	.5	4.6
2020–21	Richmond	23	23	30.9	.449	.363	**.803**	7.6	.5	1.1	**.6**	12.0
2021–22	Richmond	**37**	**37**	33.0	**.457**	**.365**	.791	**7.7**	1.0	1.1	.5	16.1
2022–23	Richmond	33	33	**36.2**	.449	.293	.761	7.4	**1.5**	**1.5**	.5	**19.0**
2023–24	Villanova	34	33	24.9	.401	.327	.750	6.1	1.0	.7	.3	7.5
Career		157	127	28.0	.445	.328	.774	6.5	.9	1.0	.5	12.0

== Personal life ==
Burton's father, Quinton, played college basketball for Providence.
