= Mark Armstrong (basketball) =

American basketball player (born 2004)

No. 18 – Rip City Remix
- Position: Point guard
- League: NBA G League

Personal information
- Born: February 21, 2004 (age 22) South Orange, New Jersey, U.S.
- Listed height: 6 ft 2 in (1.88 m)
- Listed weight: 180 lb (82 kg)

Career information
- High school: St. Peter's Prep (Jersey City, New Jersey)
- College: Villanova (2022–2024)
- NBA draft: 2024: undrafted
- Playing career: 2024–present

Career history
- 2024–2025: Long Island Nets
- 2025–2026: Texas Legends
- 2026–present: Rip City Remix

Career highlights
- Big East All-Freshman team (2023)
- Stats at NBA.com
- Stats at Basketball Reference
Medals
Men's basketball
Representing United States
FIBA Americas Under-18 Championship
Gold medal – first place	2022 Mexico	Team

Mark Armstrong (born February 21, 2004) is an American professional basketball player for the Rip City Remix of the NBA G League. He played college basketball for the Villanova Wildcats.

== Early life and high school career ==
Armstrong grew up in South Orange, New Jersey and attended St. Peter's Preparatory School in Jersey City, New Jersey. He was a four-year starter on the basketball team and averaged 15.9 points per game as a freshman. Armstrong was named third-team All-State after averaging 19.9 points per game during his sophomore season. He averaged 14.1 points, 2.4 rebounds, 2.7 assists, and 2.2 steals in eleven games during his junior season, which was shortened due to the COVID-19 pandemic. Armstrong was named the Hudson County Interscholastic League Player the Year as a senior after averaging 23.4 points, five rebounds, and 2.8 assists per game.

=== Recruiting ===
Armstrong was rated a four-star recruit and a consensus top-75 prospect by major recruiting services. On April 8, 2021, he committed to playing college basketball for Villanova over offers from Auburn, UConn, Louisville, Seton Hall, Rutgers, Stanford, and Kansas.

College recruiting
Name	Hometown	School	Height	Weight	Commit date
Mark Armstrong; PG	South Orange, NJ	St. Peter's Prep (NJ)	6 ft 2 in (1.88 m)	160 lb (73 kg)	Apr 8, 2021
Mark Armstrong; PG	Recruit ratings: Rivals: 247Sports: ESPN: (84)				
Overall recruit ranking: Rivals: 45 247Sports: 62 ESPN: 66
Note: In many cases, Scout, Rivals, 247Sports, On3, and ESPN may conflict in their listings of height and weight.; In these cases, the average was taken. ESPN grades are on a 100-point scale.; Sources: "Villanova 2022 Basketball Commitments". Rivals.; "2022 Villanova Wildcats Recruiting Class". ESPN.; "2022 Team Ranking". Rivals.

== College career ==
Armstrong began his freshman season at Villanova as a key reserve. He started six of the team's seven games in December before returning to a backup role. He was named the Big East Conference Freshman of the Week after scoring 10 points on 3-of-4 shooting from the field in his first career start against Oklahoma. Armstrong was named to the Big East All-Freshman team at the end of the regular season.

== Professional career ==
=== Long Island Nets (2024–2025) ===
After going undrafted in the 2024 NBA draft, Armstrong joined the Brooklyn Nets for the 2024 NBA Summer League and on October 9, 2024, he signed with the team. However, he was waived four days later and on October 27, he joined the Long Island Nets.

=== Texas Legends (2025–2026) ===
On September 19, 2025, Armstrong was traded to the Texas Legends in exchange for the returning player rights to Max Fiedler and a 2026 second-round pick.

=== Rip City Remix (2026–present) ===
On September 22, 2026, Armstrong signed an Exhibit 10 contract with the Portland Trail Blazers.

== National team career ==
Armstrong played for the United States under-18 basketball team at the 2022 FIBA Under-18 Americas Championship. He averaged 10.7 points, 3.7 rebounds, and 3.6 assists per game as the United States won the gold medal. Armstrong was also named to the United States' roster for the 2023 FIBA Under-19 Basketball World Cup.

== Career statistics ==
Legend
GP	Games played	GS	Games started	MPG	Minutes per game
FG%	Field goal percentage	3P%	3-point field goal percentage	FT%	Free throw percentage
RPG	Rebounds per game	APG	Assists per game	SPG	Steals per game
BPG	Blocks per game	PPG	Points per game	**Bold**	Career high

=== College ===
Year	Team	GP	GS	MPG	FG%	3P%	FT%	RPG	APG	SPG	BPG	PPG
2022–23	Villanova	**34**	7	19.9	.401	.246	**.875**	2.0	1.0	.8	.1	5.3
2023–24	Villanova	**34**	**32**	**24.5**	**.417**	**.282**	.776	**2.3**	**2.4**	**.9**	**.2**	**8.4**
Career		68	39	22.2	.411	.266	.805	2.1	1.7	.8	.2	6.8
