= Eric Dixon (basketball) =

American basketball player (born 2001)

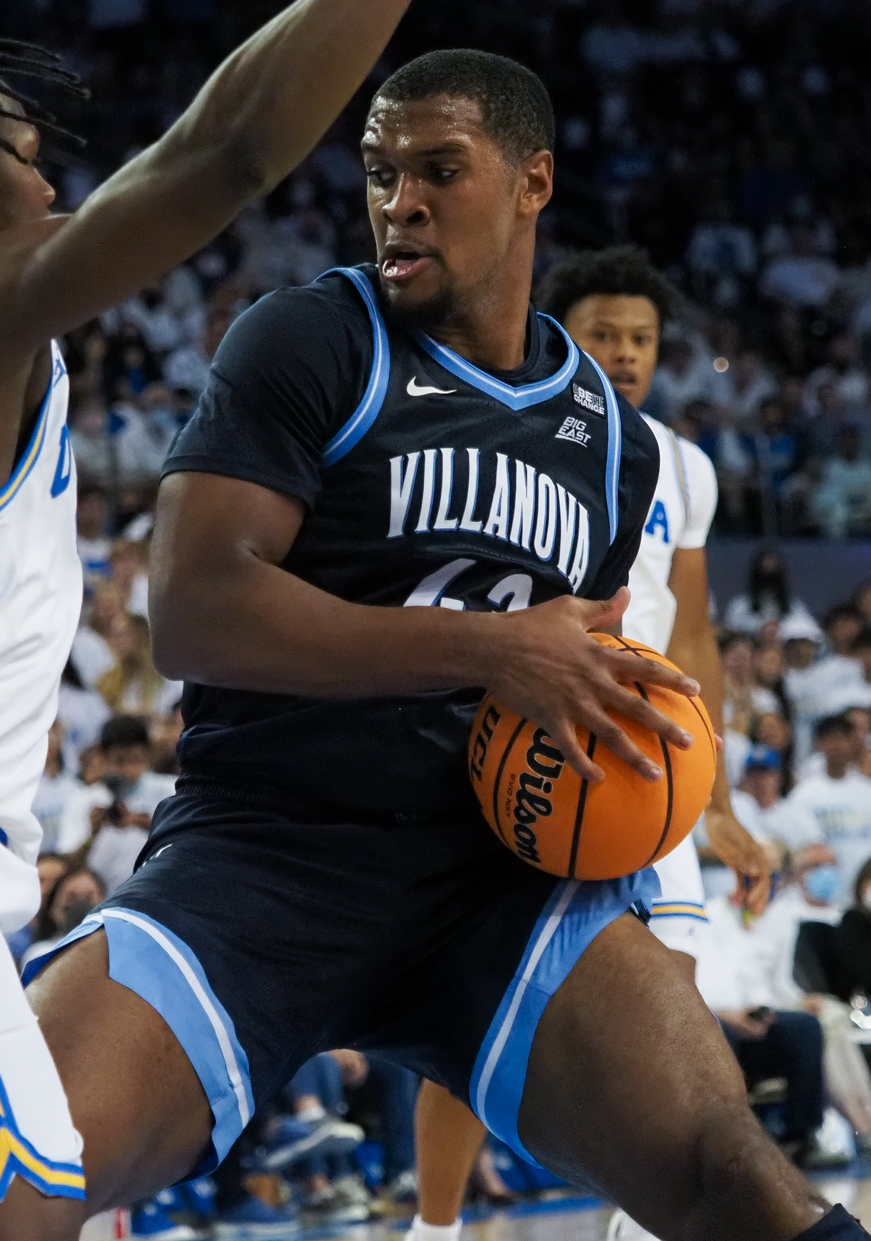
- Dixon with Villanova in 2021

No. 43 – Memphis Hustle
- Position: Power forward
- League: NBA G League

Personal information
- Born: January 26, 2001 (age 25) Bryn Mawr, Pennsylvania, U.S.
- Listed height: 6 ft 6 in (1.98 m)
- Listed weight: 255 lb (116 kg)

Career information
- High school: Abington (Abington, Pennsylvania)
- College: Villanova (2020–2025)
- NBA draft: 2025: undrafted
- Playing career: 2025–present

Career history
- 2025–2026: Greensboro Swarm
- 2026–present: Memphis Hustle
- 2026: NBA G League United

Career highlights
- FIBA Intercontinental Cup champion (2026); FIBA Intercontinental Cup MVP (2026); NCAA scoring champion (2025); Second-team All-American – SN (2025); Third-team All-American – AP, USBWA, NABC (2025); First-team All-Big East (2025); 2× Second-team All-Big East (2023, 2024); 2× Robert V. Geasey Trophy (2024, 2025); Mr. Pennsylvania Basketball (2019)
- Stats at NBA.com
- Stats at Basketball Reference

Eric Julius Dixon (born January 26, 2001) is an American professional basketball player for the Memphis Hustle of the NBA G League. He played college basketball for the Villanova Wildcats.

== High school career ==
Dixon attended Abington Senior High School in Abington, Pennsylvania. As a senior, he averaged 27.9 points and 11.6 rebounds per game, leading the Ghosts to a 28–2 record. Dixon scored 38 points in an overtime win over Coatesville to secure the PIAA Class 6A District 1 title and finished his career as Abington's all-time leading scorer with 2,454 points. He was named 2018–19 All-Area boys’ basketball player of the year. A consensus four-star recruit, Dixon committed to playing college basketball for Villanova, choosing the Wildcats over Virginia, Seton Hall, and Louisville.

== College career ==
Dixon redshirted his true freshman season at Villanova. As a redshirt freshman, Dixon averaged three points and 1.6 rebounds per game. He posted 9.1 points and 6.4 rebounds per game as a sophomore, earning Big 5 Most Improved Player honors. As a junior, Dixon averaged 15.4 points and 6.6 rebounds per game, earning Second Team All-Big East honors. In his fifth and final year, Dixon led the nation in scoring with 23.3 points per game and earned third team All-American honors. He retired as Villanova's Men's Basketball all-time leading scorer (2,314 points), breaking a record held by Kerry Kittles for 29 years.

== Professional career ==
After going undrafted in the 2025 NBA draft, Dixon joined the Los Angeles Lakers for the 2025 NBA Summer League. However, due to a foot injury, he did not play during the Summer League. He signed with the Lakers on July 26, but was waived on September 27. On October 8, Dixon signed with the Charlotte Hornets, but was waived on October 18. He subsequently joined the Greensboro Swarm of the NBA G League for the 2025–26 season.

On February 10, 2026, Dixon was traded to the Memphis Hustle for Evan Gilyard and the returning player rights for Armando Bacot.

== Career statistics ==
Legend
| GP | Games played | GS | Games started | MPG | Minutes per game |
| FG% | Field goal percentage | 3P% | 3-point field goal percentage | FT% | Free throw percentage |
| RPG | Rebounds per game | APG | Assists per game | SPG | Steals per game |
| BPG | Blocks per game | PPG | Points per game | **Bold** | Career high |

=== College ===
| * | Led NCAA Division I |
| * | Led Big East Conference |

| Year | Team | GP | GS | MPG | FG% | 3P% | FT% | RPG | APG | SPG | BPG | PPG |
|---|---|---|---|---|---|---|---|---|---|---|---|---|
| 2019–20 | Villanova | Redshirt | | | | | | | | | | |
| 2020–21 | Villanova | 21 | 0 | 8.2 | .467 | .250 | .645 | 1.6 | .3 | .2 | .3 | 3.0 |
| 2021–22 | Villanova | **38*** | **38*** | 25.2 | **.498** | **.486** | .821 | 6.4 | 1.3 | .7 | .5 | 9.1 |
| 2022–23 | Villanova | 34 | 34 | 31.6 | .492 | .378 | .792 | **6.6** | 1.4 | .5 | **.6** | 15.4 |
| 2023–24 | Villanova | 34 | 34 | 30.6 | .465 | .346 | **.862** | 6.5 | 1.7 | **.8** | .4 | 16.6 |
| 2024–25 | Villanova | 35 | 35 | **34.8** | .451 | .407 | .813 | 5.1 | **1.9** | **.8** | .4 | **23.3*** |
| Career | | 162 | 141 | 27.5 | .471 | .387 | .813 | 5.6 | 1.4 | .7 | .4 | 14.3 |
