= Justin Moore (basketball) =

American basketball player

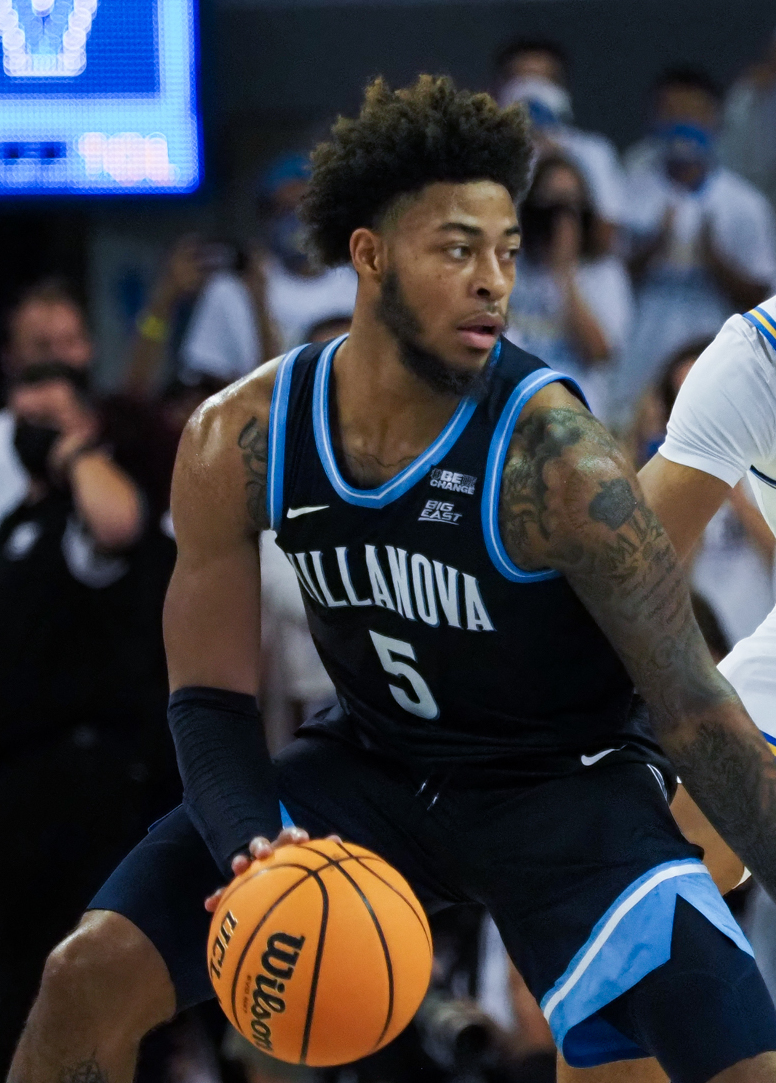
- Moore with Villanova in 2021

Personal information
- Born: April 12, 2000 (age 26) Fort Washington, Maryland, U.S.
- Listed height: 6 ft 5 in (1.96 m)
- Listed weight: 210 lb (95 kg)

Career information
- High school: DeMatha Catholic (Hyattsville, Maryland)
- College: Villanova (2019–2024)
- NBA draft: 2024: undrafted
- Playing career: 2024–present
- Position: Shooting guard

Career history
- 2024–2025: Wisconsin Herd

Career highlights
- Second-team All-Big East (2022); Big East All-Freshman Team (2020); Nike Hoop Summit (2019)

Justin Moore (born April 12, 2000) is an American former professional basketball player. He played college basketball for the Villanova Wildcats.

== High school career ==
Moore attended DeMatha Catholic High School in Hyattsville, Maryland. He suffered a season-ending torn ACL as a sophomore. In his junior season, Moore averaged 16.6 points per game. As a senior, he averaged 18.2 points, 7.1 rebounds and 4.1 assists per game, leading his team to its second straight Maryland Private School Tournament state title. Moore was named Maryland Gatorade Player of the Year and Washington Catholic Athletic Conference Co-Player of the Year. He competed for Team Takeover on the Amateur Athletic Union circuit. Winning the 2019 EYBL Nike Peach Jam. Moore was additionally invited to play in the 2019 Nike Hoop Summit. A four-star recruit, he committed to playing college basketball for Villanova over offers from Maryland, Louisville and Wake Forest, among others.

== College career ==
On December 1, 2019, Moore recorded a freshman season-high 25 points and five steals for Villanova in an 83–72 win over La Salle. On February 26, 2020, he posted 21 points including five three-pointers in a 71–60 win against St. John's. As a freshman, he averaged 11.3 points, 3.1 rebounds and 1.9 assists per game, leading all Big East freshman in regular season scoring. Moore was a five-time Big East Freshman of the Week selection. He was unanimously named to the Big East All-Freshman Team.

Coming into his sophomore season, Moore was named to the preseason Jerry West Award watchlist as well as Preseason Second Team All-Big East. As a sophomore, Moore averaged 12.9 points and 4.1 rebounds per game, helping Villanova reach the Sweet 16. In his junior season debut, he scored a career-high 27 points including six three-pointers in a 91–51 win over Mount St. Mary's. On February 3, 2022, Moore surpassed the 1,000 point mark in a 83–73 loss to Marquette. He was named to the Second Team All-Big East.

== Professional career ==
=== Wisconsin Herd (2024–2025) ===
After going undrafted in the 2024 NBA draft, Moore joined the Milwaukee Bucks for the 2024 NBA Summer League and on October 26, he joined the Indiana Mad Ants of the NBA G League. However, he was waived on November 6 and five days later, he joined the Osceola Magic. However, he was waived on November 26, before playing for the team. On December 9, he joined the Wisconsin Herd. However, he was waived on January 6, 2025, rejoining the team two days later.

== Career statistics ==
Legend
GP	Games played	GS	Games started	MPG	Minutes per game
FG%	Field goal percentage	3P%	3-point field goal percentage	FT%	Free throw percentage
RPG	Rebounds per game	APG	Assists per game	SPG	Steals per game
BPG	Blocks per game	PPG	Points per game	**Bold**	Career high

=== College ===
Year	Team	GP	GS	MPG	FG%	3P%	FT%	RPG	APG	SPG	BPG	PPG
2019–20	Villanova	31	17	29.9	.418	**.396**	.714	3.1	1.9	.7	.3	11.3
2020–21	Villanova	25	24	32.8	**.441**	.310	.778	4.1	3.0	.6	**.4**	12.9
2021–22	Villanova	**36**	**36**	**34.6**	.397	.356	.750	**4.8**	2.3	**1.0**	**.4**	**14.8**
2022–23	Villanova	13	13	32.0	.420	.341	.762	3.5	**3.2**	.5	.0	13.5
2023–24	Villanova	29	29	29.6	.384	.312	**.864**	3.6	2.2	.6	**.4**	9.8
Career		134	120	31.8	.410	.346	.766	3.9	2.4	.7	.3	12.4
