= Mike Nardi =

American basketball coach (born 1985)

UConn Huskies
- Title: Assistant coach
- League: Big East Conference

Personal information
- Born: January 30, 1985 (age 41) Linden, New Jersey, U.S.
- Listed height: 6 ft 2 in (1.88 m)
- Listed weight: 170 lb (77 kg)

Career information
- High school: St. Patrick (Elizabeth, New Jersey)
- College: Villanova (2003–2007)
- NBA draft: 2007: undrafted
- Playing career: 2008–2015
- Position: Point guard / shooting guard
- Coaching career: 2017–present

Career history

Playing
- 2008–2009: Air Avellino
- 2009–2010: Scavolini Spar Pesaro
- 2010–2011: Armani Jeans Milano
- 2011–2012: Fulgor Libertas Forlì
- 2012–2013: Matrixx Magixx
- 2013–2014: Staff Mantova
- 2014–2015: B.A. Latina

Coaching
- 2017–2018: Villanova (DBO)
- 2018–2025: Villanova (assistant)
- 2025: Villanova (interim)
- 2025–present: UConn (assistant)

Career highlights
- Big East All-Rookie Team (2004); Third-team Parade All-American (2003)

Mike Nardi (born January 30, 1985) is an American basketball coach and former player who is currently an assistant coach for the UConn Huskies men's basketball team. He attended St. Patrick High School in Elizabeth, New Jersey and Villanova University.

== Career ==
As a senior in high school, Nardi was a 2003 Parade All-American at St. Patrick. At Villanova, Nardi was most commonly known for his three-point shooting abilities and his strength off the dribble. He posted 11.8 points per game his senior year.

Nardi was a member of the "four guard lineup" alongside Randy Foye, Allan Ray, and Kyle Lowry, that led the Wildcats to an NCAA tournament number one seed, and an elite eight appearance where they lost to the eventual champions, Florida. They were ranked as high as the #2 team in the country in 2006 and they never left the top 10 that season. They split the regular season Big East Conference title with UConn and lost to Pitt in the Big East tournament.

After graduating from Villanova in 2007, Nardi spent eight years playing professionally in Italy and the Netherlands.

Nardi returned to Villanova in 2017 as part of the basketball coaching staff. He was named interim head coach in 2025 after head coach Kyle Neptune was fired.

On April 29th, 2025, it was announced that Nardi would be joining the UConn Huskies men's basketball staff as an assistant under Coach Dan Hurley after Villanova chose not to hire Nardi for the full-time head coaching position.

== Head coaching record ==
Record table
Season	Team	Overall	Conference	Standing	Postseason
Villanova Wildcats (Big East Conference) (2025)
2024–25	Villanova	2–1			CBC Semifinals
Villanova:		2–1 (.667)			
Total:		2–1 (.667)			
National champion Postseason invitational champion Conference regular season champion Conference regular season and conference tournament champion Division regular season champion Division regular season and conference tournament champion Conference tournament champion
