= Kyle Neptune =

American basketball player and coach (born 1985)

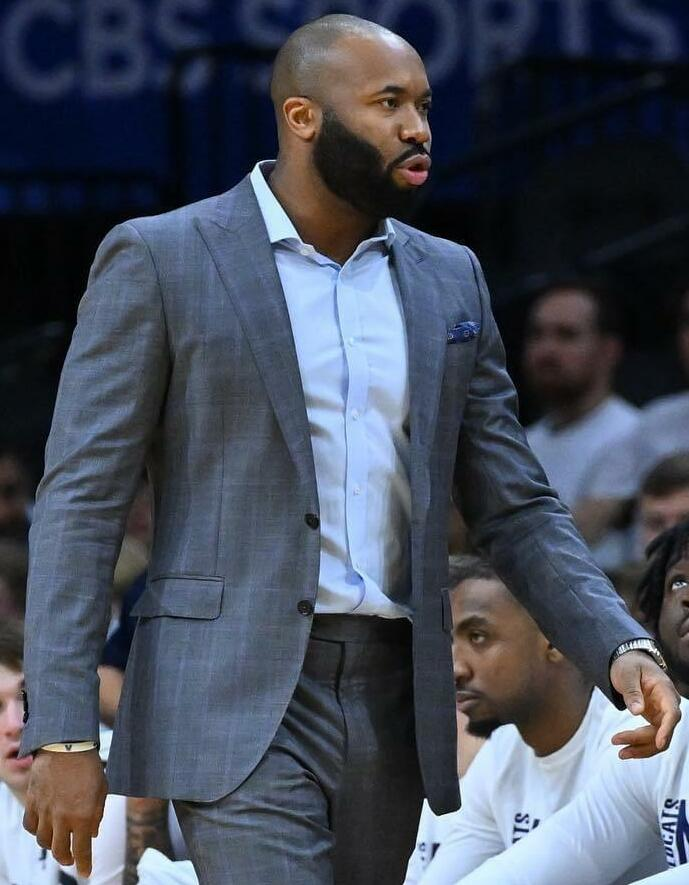
- Neptune as head coach of Villanova in 2022

Charlotte Hornets
- Title: Assistant coach
- League: NBA

Personal information
- Born: January 21, 1985 (age 41) Brooklyn, New York, U.S.
- Listed height: 6 ft 5 in (1.96 m)
- Listed weight: 220 lb (100 kg)

Career information
- High school: Brooklyn Friends School (Brooklyn, New York)
- College: Lehigh (2003–2007)
- NBA draft: 2007: undrafted
- Playing career: 2007–2008
- Position: Guard
- Coaching career: 2008–present

Career history

Playing
- 2007–2008: Šiauliai
- 2007–2008: San Germán

Coaching
- 2008–2010: Villanova (video coordinator)
- 2010–2013: Niagara (assistant)
- 2013–2021: Villanova (assistant)
- 2021–2022: Fordham
- 2022–2025: Villanova
- 2025–present: Charlotte Hornets (assistant)

Kyle Alexander Neptune (born January 21, 1985) is an American professional basketball coach and former player who is an assistant coach for the Charlotte Hornets of the National Basketball Association (NBA). He previously served as head coach of the Villanova Wildcats men's basketball team.

== Playing career ==
Neptune attended Brooklyn Friends School, and was a member of the school's 2003 State Championship team, recording a school record in points with 1,650. He played collegiate basketball at Lehigh under Billy Taylor where he was a member of the Mountain Hawks' 2004 NCAA tournament team.

== Coaching career ==
Neptune's coaching career began in 2008 as a video coordinator under Jay Wright at Villanova and was on staff for the Wildcats' 2009 Final Four appearance. In 2010, he joined Joe Mihalich's staff at Niagara for three seasons before returning to Villanova as an assistant coach for eight seasons. During his time as an assistant coach, the Wildcats earned five Big East men's basketball tournament titles, as well as two national championships in 2016 and 2018.

On March 30, 2021, Neptune was named the head coach at Fordham, replacing Jeff Neubauer. The Rams went 16-16 that year, including an 8-10 record in the Atlantic 10 Conference, where they finished 8th.

Neptune would serve only one season at Fordham, as he was announced as Villanova's new head coach on April 20, 2022, following Wright's retirement.

On December 17, 2022, Neptune became the first Villanova men's basketball coach since Jack Kraft in 1962 to win a share of the Philadelphia Big 5 basketball title in his first year as coach of the program. On December 21, 2022, Neptune won his first Big East Conference game with a 78–63 victory over St. John's.

Neptune joined Rollie Massimino as the two Villanova coaches to finish with a .500 or better conference record in his first season in the Big East. Neptune finished 10–10.

On March 15, 2025, Neptune was fired by Villanova after a disappointing three-year tenure and 51-47 record, during which the Wildcats were unable to advance past the second round of the Big East Tournament or make the NCAA tournament.

On August 29, 2025, Neptune agreed to join the Charlotte Hornets as an assistant coach under head coach Charles Lee.

== Head coaching record ==
Record table
Season	Team	Overall	Conference	Standing	Postseason
Fordham Rams (Atlantic 10 Conference) (2021–2022)
2021–22	Fordham	16–16	8–10	8th	
Fordham:		16–16 (.500)	8–10 (.444)		
Villanova Wildcats (Big East Conference) (2022–2025)
2022–23	Villanova	17–17	10–10	T–6th	NIT First Round
2023–24	Villanova	18–16	10–10	T–6th	NIT First Round
2024–25	Villanova	19–14	11–9	6th	
Villanova:		54–47 (.535)	31–29 (.517)		
Total:		70–63 (.526)			
