= Dwayne Anderson =

American basketball player (born 1986)

UCF Knights
- Title: Assistant coach
- League: Big 12 Conference

Personal information
- Born: June 22, 1986 (age 40) Washington, D.C., U.S.
- Listed height: 6 ft 6 in (1.98 m)
- Listed weight: 215 lb (98 kg)

Career information
- High school: St. John's College HS (Washington, D.C.); St. Thomas More (Oakdale, Connecticut)
- College: Villanova (2005–2009)
- NBA draft: 2009: undrafted
- Playing career: 2009–2013
- Position: Shooting guard / small forward
- Coaching career: 2013–present

Career history

Playing
- 2009–2011: BG Göttingen
- 2011–2012: Piacenza
- 2012–2013: S.Oliver Baskets

Coaching
- 2013–2018: Penn State (assistant)
- 2018–2021: Villanova (dir. basketball ops)
- 2021–2025: Villanova (assistant)
- 2025–present: UCF

Career highlights
- All-EuroCup Second Team (2011); 2x German All-Star (2011, 2013)

Dwayne Anderson II (born June 22, 1986) is an American basketball coach and former American professional basketball player who is an assistant coach for the UCF men's basketball team. He last played for S.Oliver Baskets in the German Basketball League. He played college basketball, as both a forward and a guard at Villanova University.

== Early life ==
Anderson was born on June 22, 1986, in Washington, D.C., to Dwayne Anderson Sr. and Michelle Anderson. He has two younger brothers, David and Darian.

== High school ==
Anderson was originally educated at St. John's College High School in Washington, D.C. While a junior, he averaged 19.7 points per game. One of his teammates, Dante Cunningham, would later play at Villanova with Anderson. He would graduate there and play a graduate year at St. Thomas More.

== College ==
=== Freshman ===
At Villanova University, Anderson saw action in 14 games during his freshman year. His collegiate debut was an 86–57 victory over Stony Brook University on November 30. Anderson racked up three points in seven minutes of play in the opening win. In a game against La Salle on December 22, he recorded a season-high ten points while playing seven minutes off the bench. Villanova won by a score of 98–57. Overall Anderson averaged 1.5 points and 3.9 minutes per game.

=== Sophomore ===
Anderson was again lightly regarded for his sophomore year.

=== Junior ===
In the 30 games that he played, Anderson scored an average of 6.5 points per game, with six games in double figures. He also grabbed 4.8 rebounds per game and stole the ball 44 times, the team's third best. He started in the last 14 games of the season, giving Villanova a 9–5 record with him on the starting lineup. Of his 145 attempts from the field, Anderson made 73, averaging a field goal percentage of .503. Shot 62.8% from the free throw line, and 31.8% from three. In his first start, Anderson sunk a three-pointer with 13 seconds left to give Villanova a 72–70 win over Seton Hall.

=== Senior ===
On November 14, 2008, the Villanova Wildcats announced that Anderson was forced to miss an indefinite number of games due to a fractured left foot. He went on to miss the inaugural seven games, though was back to play Houston Baptist University. Villanova blew them out 93–57. Upon his return, Anderson helped lead Villanova to the 2009 Final Four in Detroit, where the Wildcats lost to eventual champion North Carolina.

== Professional career ==
In summer of 2009 he signed with BG Göttingen in Germany, where he played for two seasons. Next, Anderson moved his talents to Italy, where he played for Piacenza for the 2011–2012 season. In August 2012, Anderson chose to return to Germany and signed with the S.Oliver Baskets in the German Basketball League. He averaged 13.35 points per game and 7.2 rebounds per game, and was named to his second All Star team.

== Coaching career ==
In 2013, he was named an assistant coach at Penn State University.

In 2018, Anderson returned to Villanova to become director of basketball operations.

In 2025, Anderson departed Villanova to become an assistant coach under Johnny Dawkins at UCF.
