= Holy War (Saint Joseph's–Villanova) =

American college basketball rivalry

The Holy War
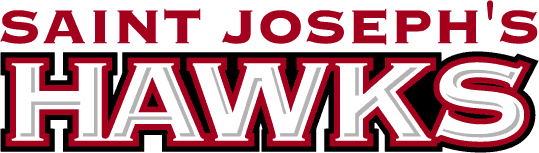
- Saint Joseph's University Villanova University
- Sport: NCAA Division 1 Basketball
- First meeting: January 15, 1921; Villanova Victory
- Latest meeting: November 12, 2024; SJU, 83–76
- Next meeting: 2026
- Trophy: None

Statistics
- Total meetings: 81
- All-time series: Villanova leads, 54–27
- Longest win streak: Villanova, 11
- Current win streak: SJU, 2

Locations in the Greater Philadelphia Area

The Holy War is a basketball rivalry game in the Philadelphia Big 5 between Saint Joseph's University and Villanova University, which is considered one of the most intense of all the Big 5 games. It is called the "Holy War" because both universities have Roman Catholic religious affiliations: Villanova University is Augustinian, and Saint Joseph's University is run by the Jesuit order. Historically, games between the two schools have been played either at the Palestra on the campus of the University of Pennsylvania when Saint Joseph's hosts the game, or at The Pavilion when Villanova is the host. However, the Hawks hosted the Wildcats at Hagan Arena on Saint Joseph's campus on December 17, 2011, following renovations, and has continued to do so in future years.

Villanova leads the all-time series, 54–27 and 42–26 as members of the Big 5. Don DiJulia, the former athletic director at Saint Joseph's has called the rivalry the "Army–Navy of basketball".

== History of the programs ==
| Category | Hawks | Wildcats |
|---|---|---|
| NCAA Championships | 0 | 3 |
| NCAA Championship Appearances | 0 | 4 |
| Players with All-America Honors | 10 | 24 |
| NBA Draft Picks | 33 | 63 |
| Naismith Coach of the Year | 1 | 2 |
| NCAA Final Fours | 1 | 7 |
| Elite Eights | 3 | 15 |
| Sweet Sixteens | 7 | 20 |
| NCAA Tournament Berths | 21 | 41 |
| NCAA Tournament Wins | 19 | 71 |
| Big 5 Championships | 20 | 28 |
| NIT Championships | 0 | 1 |

== The Origin of the Series, Prior to the Formation of the Big Five ==
Villanova played SJU (then St. Joseph's College) twice, during the Wildcats' first ever season on the hardwood, which took place during the 1920–21 school year. The first contest took place on January 15, 1921, on the Main Line, with 'Nova winning 31–22. In the return game, Villanova completed the sweep by prevailing 24–14. The teams clashed often during the 1920s, but after the 1930 game, the series lay dormant for a long time. In the ensuing quarter-century, the only meeting was in 1939. Villanova had won eleven of the twelve meetings since the first game took place in 1921, until the formation of the Big Five in the 1955–56 season.

== Beginning of Big Five rivalry ==
When the Big Five got rolling, it was SJU's turn to dominate the series for the next decade before Villanova turned the tide. The Hawks won the first six City Series games and ten of the first twelve. The two schools had the honor of clashing in the first-ever Big Five contest at the Palestra, on December 14, 1955– St. Joe's won, 83–70. Starting with the 1958 game, every single VU/SJU game attracted a sellout or near-sellout crowd at the Palestra, with the high attendance continuous for all games since then, regardless of venue. The attendance for the 1957 game climbed to 5,659, but since then the Palestra was packed to the rafters for Villanova/St. Joe's. Villanova now leads the series 37–23 since both schools became members of the Big Five.

== Modern era match-ups ==
February 20, 1971/March 13, 1971— The Porter-led Wildcats will go 23–6 and reach the NCAA championship game before bowing to John Wooden's UCLA dynasty. But en route, they meet St. Joe's twice in one season, for the first time since 1923. In the City Series game, Villanova triumphs 63–55, although Hawks center Mike Bantom outplays Howard Porter. The schools would meet again at the Palestra, in the first round of the NCAA tournament (the only time, before or since, the Holy War has extended to postseason play). 'Nova won in a rout, 93–75.

February 19, 1977—The first City Series game away from the Palestra, as the Villanova/St. Joe's game goes to the Spectrum, to accommodate more fans for both schools. The Wildcats win 92–78, in front of 12,138 fans.

February 22, 1983—In the second Spectrum game in the series, a record throng of 18,060 witnesses a 70–62 Wildcat victory, the most to ever witness a Holy War.

February 19, 1985—It was the annus mirabilis (in Latin, the "year of miracles") on the Main Line. And perhaps the basketball gods' first sign of favor took place at the Spectrum, in the Holy War. Villanova entered the game having lost three in a row, while the Hawks had won nine straight. Villanova was 3–0 in City Series play, but SJU was 1–1 and could pursue a share of the Big Five title with a victory over the 'Cats. 'Nova started the game on a 9–2 run, but by halftime the Hawks had overtaken them, 22–19. St. Joe's led 30–23 with 14:18 to go, before 'Nova rallied. Ed Pinckney connected on two free throws to draw the Wildcats even at 44 with 3:08 to play. SJU nearly succeeded in holding the ball for three minutes to take the last shot. Dwayne McClain rebounded the errant St. Joe's shot with only four seconds to go. On the inbounds play, McClain hit an 18-footer and was fouled. By converting the three-point play, McClain gave Villanova a 47–44 victory- and the outright Big Five title for the first time since 1967. Villanova would then win the 1985 NCAA Division I men's basketball tournament two months later, their first of three National Championships.

December 18, 1994—The Holy War, now taking place every other year due to Villanova's 1991–99 withdrawal from the full round-robin, returns to the Palestra for the first time in over six years. #22 Villanova – at the apex of the Kerry Kittles era – is a favorite over a St. Joe's squad. (The Hawks hadn't reached postseason play since 1986.) But Dmitri Domani hits two key free throws down the stretch, to give St. Joe's a 60–57 upset victory.

December 11, 2000—The Holy War returns to the Palestra. St. Joe's comes close to its long-denied victory over the Wildcats, leading 39–32 at intermission. O'Connor dazzles with 32 points on 11–17 shooting to lead the Hawks. But 'Nova rallies in the second half to come away with a hard-fought, thrilling 78–75 victory. Michael Bradley has a field day in the paint, scoring 20 points and grabbing 10 rebounds. Reggie Bryant and Aaron Matthews add 13 for the 'Cats.

January 1, 2002 - In Jay Wright's first Holy War, Villanova defeats St. Joe's 102–73, marking the only time either team has scored 100 points or more in the series.

February 2004—The #3 Hawks entered the Pavilion with a record of 18–0. They would eventually garner a #1 seed in the NCAA tournament and reach the Elite Eight. The Wildcats fell to Hawks 74–67. Jameer Nelson and Delonte West combined for 45 points. Mike Nardi led the Wildcat counterattack with 16 points and five assists. A three-pointer from Andreas Bloch cut the Hawk lead to 54–50, with less than nine minutes to play, but that was as close as 'Nova came to an upset.

February 2006-Villanova, holding the #4 ranking in the nation, faced off against St. Joe's at the Palestra in a celebration of the 50th anniversary of the Big 5 and with the Big 5 title on the line. With the arena split 50/50 with fans of each school, St. Joe's got off to a blistering start. Villanova looked flat, shooting 30 percent in the first half and trailing 34–22 at halftime. The second half was a different story, Villanova came out running, trapping and scoring at such a rapid rate that St. Joe's was helpless to stop them. A dominating 21–3 run led by Kyle Lowry and Allan Ray turned the game around for good. Lowry scored 17 of his 25 points in the second half and completed the only dunk of his college career.

December 2012—The Hawks were leading the Wildcats in the second half of the game at the Pavilion, when St. Joe's Junior Forward Halil Kanacevic drained a 3-pointer with 10 minutes left in the game. He then raised a double-middle-finger to the Villanova Student Section, thrusting "Nova Nation" into wild uproar. The students loudly booed Kanacevic throughout the rest of the game, and Kanacevic proceeded to blow the game for St. Joe's down the stretch with a series of bad plays and fouls; most notable of these was a pair of missed free throws with 45 seconds left in the game, and a turnover with 3 seconds left in the game, costing St. Joe's a chance to tie the game late. Kanacevic finished the game with only the 3 points he scored before flipping the bird, and was slapped with a 2-game suspension by St. Joe's for his actions.

December 1, 2017 - Villanova defeats St. Joe's by a score of 94–53. Mikal Bridges, Phil Booth, Jalen Brunson, and Omari Spellman all scored in double figures. This 41 point victory marked the largest margin of victory in the series. The Wildcats would go on to win the National Championship that year.

November 29, 2023 - Before 2023, the Big 5 members played each other once annually in a round-robin format, determining the "champion" as the school(s) with the most wins in Big 5 play. However, in January 2023, administrators from the five member schools agreed on a new format for Big 5 play. This included the creation of the concluding triple-header called the Big 5 Classic and the addition of Drexel University to the series. The motivation behind this change was to "resuscitate" the Big 5, as the series had experienced declining attendance figures in the preceding years. In the inaugural Big 5 Classic, St. Joe's defeated #15 Villanova at Finneran Pavilion 78-65, advancing to the Big 5 Classic Title Game. The win snapped St. Joe's 11-game skid to the Wildcats, and marked St. Joe's first win at Villanova since a 74-67 decision on February 2, 2004. St. Joe's went on to win the first Big 5 Classic Title against Temple in the Championship.

== Game results ==
| St. Joe's victories | Villanova victories |

| No. | Date | Location | Winner | Score |
|---|---|---|---|---|
| 1 | January 15, 1921 | The Palestra | Villanova | 33–22 |
| 2 | February 16, 1921 | The Palestra | Villanova | 24–14 |
| 3 | January 25, 1922 | The Palestra | Villanova | 24–18 |
| 4 | March 4, 1922 | The Palestra | Villanova | 28–26 |
| 5 | January 20, 1923 | The Palestra | Villanova | 34–33 |
| 6 | January 31, 1923 | The Palestra | St. Joe's | 26–18 |
| 7 | January 18, 1924 | The Palestra | Villanova | 24–23 |
| 8 | January 29, 1925 | The Palestra | Villanova | 32–24 |
| 9 | February 18, 1926 | The Palestra | Villanova | 25–19 |
| 10 | January 11, 1927 | The Palestra | Villanova | 30–17 |
| 11 | January 31, 1929 | The Palestra | Villanova | 35–20 |
| 12 | February 11, 1930 | The Palestra | Villanova | 22–19 |
| 13 | February 17, 1939 | The Palestra | Villanova | 36–8 |
| 14 | December 14, 1955 | The Palestra | St. Joe's | 83–70 |
| 15 | January 19, 1957 | The Palestra | St. Joe's | 59–51 |
| 16 | February 12, 1958 | The Palestra | St. Joe's | 86–82 |
| 17 | January 9, 1959 | The Palestra | St. Joe's | 82–70 |
| 18 | February 27, 1960 | The Palestra | St. Joe's | 78–75 |
| 19 | January 28, 1961 | The Palestra | St. Joe's | 64–63 |
| 20 | March 3, 1962 | The Palestra | Villanova | 66–59 |
| 21 | December 28, 1962 | The Palestra | St. Joe's | 59–54 |
| 22 | January 12, 1963 | The Palestra | Villanova | 63–61 |
| 23 | February 22, 1964 | The Palestra | St. Joe's | 69–63 |
| 24 | February 20, 1965 | The Palestra | St. Joe's | 69–61 |
| 25 | January 16, 1966 | The Palestra | St. Joe's | 71–69 |
| 26 | February 11, 1967 | The Palestra | Villanova | 78–73 |
| 27 | February 17, 1968 | The Palestra | St. Joe's | 63–54 |
| 28 | January 11, 1969 | The Palestra | Villanova | 87–62 |
| 29 | February 7, 1970 | The Palestra | Villanova | 92–65 |
| 30 | February 20, 1971 | The Palestra | Villanova | 63–55 |
| 31 | March 13, 1971 | Philadelphia, PA | Villanova | 93–75 |
| 32 | February 4, 1972 | The Palestra | St. Joe's | 68–65 |
| 33 | January 27, 1973 | The Palestra | Villanova | 79–72 |
| 34 | February 23, 1974 | The Palestra | St. Joe's | 59–53 |
| 35 | February 22, 1975 | The Palestra | Villanova | 71–67 |
| 36 | February 28, 1976 | The Palestra | Villanova | 71–60 |
| 37 | February 19, 1977 | The Spectrum | Villanova | 92–78 |
| 38 | February 25, 1978 | The Palestra | Villanova | 72–64 |
| 39 | February 9, 1979 | The Palestra | St. Joe's | 54–50 |
| 40 | February 23, 1980 | The Palestra | St. Joe's | 60–59 |
| 41 | February 28, 1981 | The Palestra | Villanova | 72–62 |

| No. | Date | Location | Winner | Score |
|---|---|---|---|---|
| 42 | January 31, 1982 | The Palestra | St. Joe's | 84–64 |
| 43 | February 22, 1983 | The Spectrum | Villanova | 70–62 |
| 44 | November 30, 1983 | The Palestra | Villanova | 57–50 |
| 45 | February 19, 1985 | The Palestra | Villanova | 47–44 |
| 46 | December 21, 1985 | The Palestra | St. Joe's | 63–61 |
| 47 | February 19, 1987 | The Palestra | Villanova | 88–87 |
| 48 | December 12, 1987 | du Pont Pavilion | St. Joe's | 53–52 |
| 49 | January 24, 1989 | The Palestra | Villanova | 69–55 |
| 50 | January 20, 1990 | du Pont Pavilion | Villanova | 69–62 |
| 51 | December 8, 1990 | The Spectrum | Villanova | 83–82 |
| 52 | February 6, 1993 | The Spectrum | St. Joe's | 77–66 |
| 53 | December 18, 1994 | The Palestra | St. Joe's | 60–57 |
| 54 | December 10, 1996 | du Pont Pavilion | Villanova | 81–65 |
| 55 | December 1, 1998 | The Palestra | Villanova | 61–49 |
| 56 | February 17, 2000 | The Pavilion | Villanova | 68–61 |
| 57 | December 11, 2000 | The Palestra | Villanova | 78–75 |
| 58 | January 28, 2002 | The Pavilion | Villanova | 103–73 |
| 59 | February 3, 2003 | The Palestra | St. Joe's | 92–75 |
| 60 | February 2, 2004 | The Pavilion | St. Joe's | 74–67 |
| 61 | February 7, 2005 | The Palestra | Villanova | 67–52 |
| 62 | February 6, 2006 | The Palestra | Villanova | 71–58 |
| 63 | February 6, 2007 | The Pavilion | Villanova | 56–39 |
| 64 | February 4, 2008 | The Palestra | St. Joe's | 77–55 |
| 65 | December 11, 2008 | The Pavilion | Villanova | 59–56 |
| 66 | December 9, 2009 | The Palestra | Villanova | 97–89 |
| 67 | December 3, 2010 | The Pavilion | Villanova | 71–60 |
| 68 | December 17, 2011 | Hagan Arena | St. Joe's | 74–58 |
| 69 | December 11, 2012 | The Pavilion | Villanova | 65–61 |
| 70 | December 7, 2013 | Hagan Arena | Villanova | 98–68 |
| 71 | December 6, 2014 | The Pavilion | Villanova | 74–46 |
| 72 | December 1, 2015 | Hagan Arena | Villanova | 86–72 |
| 73 | December 3, 2016 | The Pavilion | Villanova | 88–57 |
| 74 | December 2, 2017 | Hagan Arena | Villanova | 94–53 |
| 75 | December 8, 2018 | Finneran Pavilion | Villanova | 70–58 |
| 76 | December 7, 2019 | Hagan Arena | Villanova | 78–66 |
| 77 | December 19, 2020 | Finneran Pavilion | Villanova | 88–68 |
| 78 | December 4, 2021 | Finneran Pavilion | Villanova | 81–52 |
| 79 | December 17, 2022 | Hagan Arena | Villanova | 71–64 |
| 80 | November 29, 2023 | Finneran Pavilion | St. Joe's | 78–65 |
| 81 | November 12, 2024 | Hagan Arena | St. Joe's | 83–76 |
Series: Villanova leads 54–27
