= Ashley Howard (basketball) =

American college basketball coach

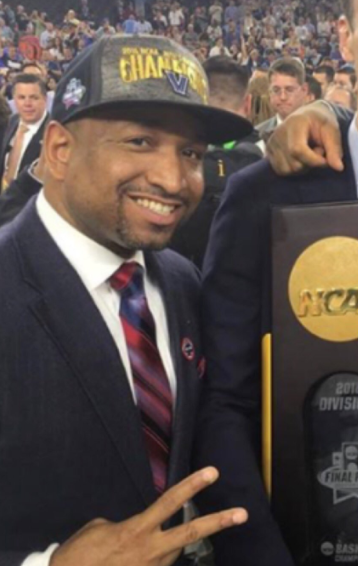
- Howard with the 2016 NCAA championship trophy

Current position
- Title: Assistant coach
- Team: Villanova
- Conference: Big East Conference

Biographical details
- Born: Philadelphia, Pennsylvania, U.S.

Playing career
- 1999–2002: Drexel
- Position: Point guard

Coaching career (HC unless noted)
- 2004–2008: La Salle (assistant)
- 2008–2012: Drexel (assistant)
- 2012–2013: Xavier (assistant)
- 2013–2018: Villanova (assistant)
- 2018–2022: La Salle
- 2023–present: Villanova (assistant)

Head coaching record
- Overall: 45–70 (.391)

Ashley Howard is an American college basketball coach, currently serving as an assistant coach at Villanova University, in his second stint with the program. He was the head men's basketball coach at La Salle University, a position he held from 2018 to 2022.

== Background ==
Howard's parents are Maurice Howard and Diane Coleman, the former of who played college basketball at the University of Maryland, and was a second round draft choice of the NBA's Cleveland Cavaliers in 1976. He also played for the New Orleans Jazz. According to Chris Mack, Xavier head coach, Howard has "been around the game his entire life. He is a tireless worker and will bring energy every single day to the practice floor. He's worked with countless pros even before he hit the college floor in a coaching capacity. It was very evident in talking to some of his former players that Ashley deeply impacts the players he coaches."

== Education ==
Howard graduated from Monsignor Bonner High School. He graduated from Drexel University with a degree in communications in 2004.

== Basketball career ==
Howard averaged 8.9 points and a team-high 4.9 assists per game with the Drexel Dragons. Howard was a guard for the team between 1999 and 2002, only stopping due to an injury. At that point, he became a student assistant coach at Drexel University until 2003. He was co-director of the Eastern Invitational Basketball Camp. In 2004, he became head coach John Giannini's assistant at La Salle Explorers. In 2006, he was an assistant coach of the Jamaica National team, accompanying the squad on its Olympic qualifying bid in Kingston. In 2008, he went back to Drexel as assistant coach to Bruiser Flint.

=== Villanova ===
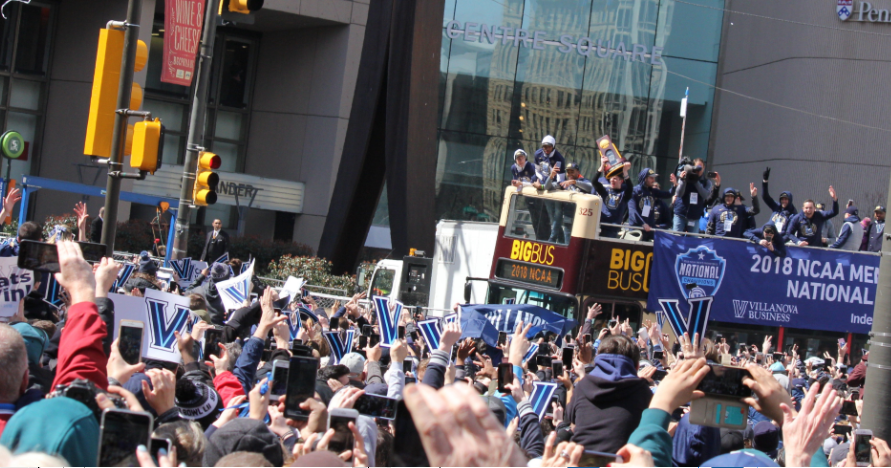
Photo from Villanova's victory parade in Center City, Philadelphia. Ashley Howard is seen on the far right.

Howard joined the Villanova basketball staff in June 2013 and has played a key role as the program has posted more than 140 victories, four Big East regular season titles and two NCAA national championships in that stretch.

Villanova head coach Jay Wright said: "We're proud to have Ashley join our Villanova Basketball family. I have known Ashley since he was a high school player. He has deep roots in Philadelphia's basketball tradition and gained an appreciation for the Augustinian values during his days as a student at Monsignor Bonner High School. He will take great pride in representing Villanova."

Howard earned two NCAA Division 1 men's basketball tournament titles with Villanova in 2016 and again in 2018.

=== La Salle ===
Howard was considered a top candidate for La Salle University's head coaching job. On April 8, 2018, La Salle announced him as the next head coach of the Explorers, succeeding his former boss John Giannini. During his first season, the Explorers finished 10–21. Howard guided the team to a 15–15 record in the 2019–20 season. Howard was fired in 2022 after an 11–19 season.

== Personal life ==
Howard married Ariana Casanovas in August 2017. Howard's daughter, Journey, was born in 2014.

== Head coaching record ==
Record table
Season	Team	Overall	Conference	Standing	Postseason
La Salle Explorers (Atlantic 10 Conference) (2018–2022)
2018–19	La Salle	10–21	8–10	9th	
2019–20	La Salle	15–15	6–12	T–10th	
2020–21	La Salle	9–16	6–11	12th	
2021–22	La Salle	11–19	5–13	T–12th	
La Salle:		45–71 (.388)	25–46 (.352)		
Total:		45–71 (.388)			
